= Surin Khong Chee Mool F.C. =

Surin Khong Chee Mool สุรินทร์ โขงชีมูล
- Full name: Surin Khong Chee Mool Football Club
- Nicknames: The Cruel Wild Elephants (ช้างไพรทมิฬ)
- Founded: 2017; 9 years ago
- Ground: Stadium of Rajamangala University of Technology Isan, Surin Campus; Surin, Thailand
- Capacity: 2,000
- Coordinates: 14°51′15″N 103°28′53″E
- Chairman: Kasemsak Saenpoch
- Head coach: Thapakorn Deemak
- League: Thai League 3
- 2025–26: Thai League 3, 12th of 12 in the Northeastern region
- Website: web.facebook.com/people/SURIN-KCM-FC/100063593740119

Surin Khong Chee Mool Football Club (Thai: สโมสรฟุตบอลสุรินทร์ โขงชีมูล) is a Thai professional football club based in Mueang, Surin, Thailand. The club is currently playing in the Thai League 3 Northeastern region.

== History ==
In 2017, the club was established with the name Khong Chee Mool Football Club and competed in the 2017 Thailand Amateur League Northeastern region, using the stadium of Rajamangala University of Technology Isan, Surin Campus as the ground. At the end of the season, they have promoted to the 2018 Thai League 4.

In 2018, the club become a professional football club and was renamed Surin Sugar Khong Chee Mool Football Club. They competed in the Thai League 4 for the 2018 season. The club has finished eighth place in the league of the Northeastern region.

In 2019, the 2019 season is the second consecutive season in the Thai League 4 of Surin Sugar Khong Chee Mool. The club has finished sixth place in the league of the Northeastern region.

In 2020, the Football Association of Thailand merged the Thai League 3 and Thai League 4. As a result of this incident, all teams in Thai League 4 were promoted to Thai League 3. The club renamed Surin Khong Chee Mool Football Club and competed in the Thai League 3 for the 2020–21 season. In late December 2020, the Coronavirus disease 2019 or also known as COVID-19 had spread again in Thailand, the FA Thailand must abruptly end the regional stage of the Thai League 3. The club has finished the seventh place of the Northeastern region. In the 2020 Thai League Cup, Surin Khong Chee Mool competed in the tournament, they defeated Ubon Kruanapat in the first qualification round. However, the FA Thailand must cancel the Thai League Cup this year due to the spreading of COVID-19.

In 2021, the 2021–22 season is the second consecutive season in the Thai League 3 of Surin Khong Chee Mool. They started the season with a 1–1 home drawn to Yasothon and they ended the season with a 2–2 away drawn to the Yasothon. The club has finished twelfth place in the league of the Northeastern region. In addition, in the 2021–22 Thai League Cup Surin Khong Chee Mool was defeated 3–5 in a penalty shoot-out by Mahasarakham in the second qualification round, causing them to be eliminated.

In 2022, Surin Khong Chee Mool competed in the Thai League 3 for the 2022–23 season. It is their 5th season in the professional league. The club started the season with a 2–4 away defeat to Rasisalai United and they ended the season with a 0–4 home defeat to Rasisalai United. The club has finished 12th place in the league of the Northeastern region. In addition, in the 2022–23 Thai FA Cup Surin Khong Chee Mool was defeated 0–4 by Nakhon Ratchasima Mazda in the third round, causing them to be eliminated and in the 2022–23 Thai League Cup Surin Khong Chee Mool was defeated 0–3 by Udon United in the second qualification round, causing them to be eliminated too.

== Stadium and locations ==
Coordinates	Location	Stadium	Year
14°51′15″N 103°28′53″E	Nok Mueang, Mueang, Surin	Stadium of Rajamangala University of Technology Isan, Surin Campus	2017 – present

== Season by season record ==
Season	League									FA Cup	League Cup	T3 Cup	Top goalscorer	
Season	Division	P	W	D	L	F	A	Pts	Pos	FA Cup	League Cup	T3 Cup	Name	Goals
2017	TA Northeast	5	3	1	1	17	8	10	1st	Opted out	Ineligible			
2018	T4 Northeast	29	9	7	10	45	53	34	8th	Opted out	QRP			
2019	T4 Northeast	24	7	11	6	33	27	32	6th	Opted out	QR1		(Japan) Miyake Kyohei	7
2020–21	T3 Northeast	16	3	6	7	25	33	15	7th	Opted out	QR1		(Thailand) Apiwat Chuenban	9
2021–22	T3 Northeast	24	1	8	15	22	57	11	12th	Opted out	QR2		(Thailand) Sarawut Wanpriangthaw	5
2022–23	T3 Northeast	24	4	4	16	25	48	16	12th	R3	QR2		(Thailand) Kroekrit Rodmueang, (Thailand) Chayapon Udornpan	6
2023–24	T3 Northeast	24	3	3	18	20	85	12	12th	Opted out	QR2	R1	(Thailand) Chayangkun Keawpasan	6
2024–25	T3 Northeast	20	5	3	12	23	51	18	10th	R1	QRP	LP	(Thailand) Tirawut Thiwato	8
2025–26	T3 Northeast	22	2	5	15	16	47	11	12th	R1	QR2	LP	(Thailand) Poosit Sukreum	5

Champions	Runners-up	Promoted	Relegated

- P = Played
- W = Games won
- D = Games drawn
- L = Games lost
- F = Goals for
- A = Goals against
- Pts = Points
- Pos = Final position
- QR1 = First Qualifying Round
- QR2 = Second Qualifying Round
- R1 = Round 1
- R2 = Round 2
- R3 = Round 3
- R4 = Round 4
- R5 = Round 5
- R6 = Round 6
- QF = Quarter-finals
- SF = Semi-finals
- RU = Runners-up
- W = Winners

== Players ==
As of 24 September 2024

Note: Flags indicate national team as defined under FIFA eligibility rules; some limited exceptions apply. Players may hold more than one non-FIFA nationality.

No.	Pos.	Nation	Player
1	GK	THA	Montree Norsoongneon
2	DF	THA	Sinsamoot Kunsornnan
3	DF	THA	Surawut Tarnparsert
4	DF	THA	Warawut Chariphai
5	MF	THA	Praphas Rattanadee
6	DF	THA	Tripop Moomthong
7	MF	THA	Chayapon Udornpan
8	MF	THA	Wichit Duangdee
10	MF	THA	Apiwat Chuenban
11	FW	ARG	Leonardo Ferrari
14	MF	THA	Poosit Sukreum
15	MF	THA	Teetawat Chaiya
16	MF	THA	Natipong Sriphet
17	DF	THA	Arnupap Krasoonram
18	GK	THA	Sutthithanin Yotdam

No.	Pos.	Nation	Player
21	GK	THA	Supanat Buransee
22	MF	THA	Pheerawas Phunchai
23	MF	THA	Wongsathon Silakul
26	GK	THA	Kittipol Jantasila
28	MF	THA	Aditep Phoka
33	DF	THA	Methee Sornjitt
34	DF	THA	Wasu Philaiwan
44	DF	THA	Thawatchai Chalaewchalad
49	MF	THA	Phakphum Ngoenlat
56	MF	THA	Phakhathon Phosri
66	MF	THA	Wianchai Sorawan
70	DF	THA	Wuttiphan Pankiat
74	DF	THA	Songyot Boonkhueang
91	DF	THA	Supakorn Prasongdee
