= 2024–25 Thai League 3 Northeastern Region =

Thai League 3 Northeastern Region
- Season: 2024–25
- Dates: 14 September 2024 – 30 March 2025
- Champions: Rasisalai United
- T3 National Championship: Rasisalai United; Khon Kaen
- Matches: 110
- Goals: 301 (2.74 per match)
- Top goalscorer: (Brazil) Alberto Moreira Gouvea (18 goals; Rasisalai United)
- Best goalkeeper: (Thailand) Adisak Boonthawi (12 clean sheets; Udon United)
- Biggest home win: 8 goals difference Rasisalai United 9–1 Khon Kaen Mordindang (14 September 2024); Rasisalai United 8–0 Surin Khong Chee Mool (29 September 2024)
- Biggest away win: 5 goals difference Yasothon 2–7 Surin Khong Chee Mool (30 March 2025)
- Highest scoring: 10 goals Rasisalai United 9–1 Khon Kaen Mordindang (14 September 2024)
- Longest winning run: 12 matches Rasisalai United
- Longest unbeaten run: 15 matches Khon Kaen; Rasisalai United
- Longest winless run: 14 matches Surin City
- Longest losing run: 7 matches Roi Et PB United
- Highest attendance: 1,288; Roi Et PB United 0–0 Muang Loei United (26 October 2024)
- Lowest attendance: 0
- Total attendance: 38,218
- Average attendance: 351

The 2024–25 Thai League 3 Northeastern Region is part of the 2024–25 Thai League 3 Regional Stage, consisting of 11 clubs located in the northeastern region (Isan) of Thailand. The season will commence on 14 September 2024, with clubs competing in a round-robin format featuring home-and-away matches. The Regional Stage will conclude on 30 March 2025, at which point the top two clubs will advance to the National Championship Stage, while the bottom-placed club will face relegation to the Thailand Semi-pro League for the following season. This stage celebrates the enduring passion for football in Isan, where communities embrace the sport as a vital part of their regional identity and pride.

== Seasonal Changes ==
=== Promotion from Thailand Semi-pro League ===
Roi Et PB United was promoted from the Thailand Semi-pro League and will make its debut in the Northeastern Region for the 2024–25 season.

=== Promotion to Thai League 2 ===
Sisaket United and Mahasarakham SBT achieved promotion to Thai League 2, having finished as the national runners-up and third place, respectively. Both clubs will be missed in this region, where they were top performers.

=== Relegation based on performance ===
Nakhon Ratchasima United was relegated to the Thailand Semi-pro League after finishing last in the Northeastern Region during the 2023–24 season.

== Teams ==
=== Number of teams by province ===
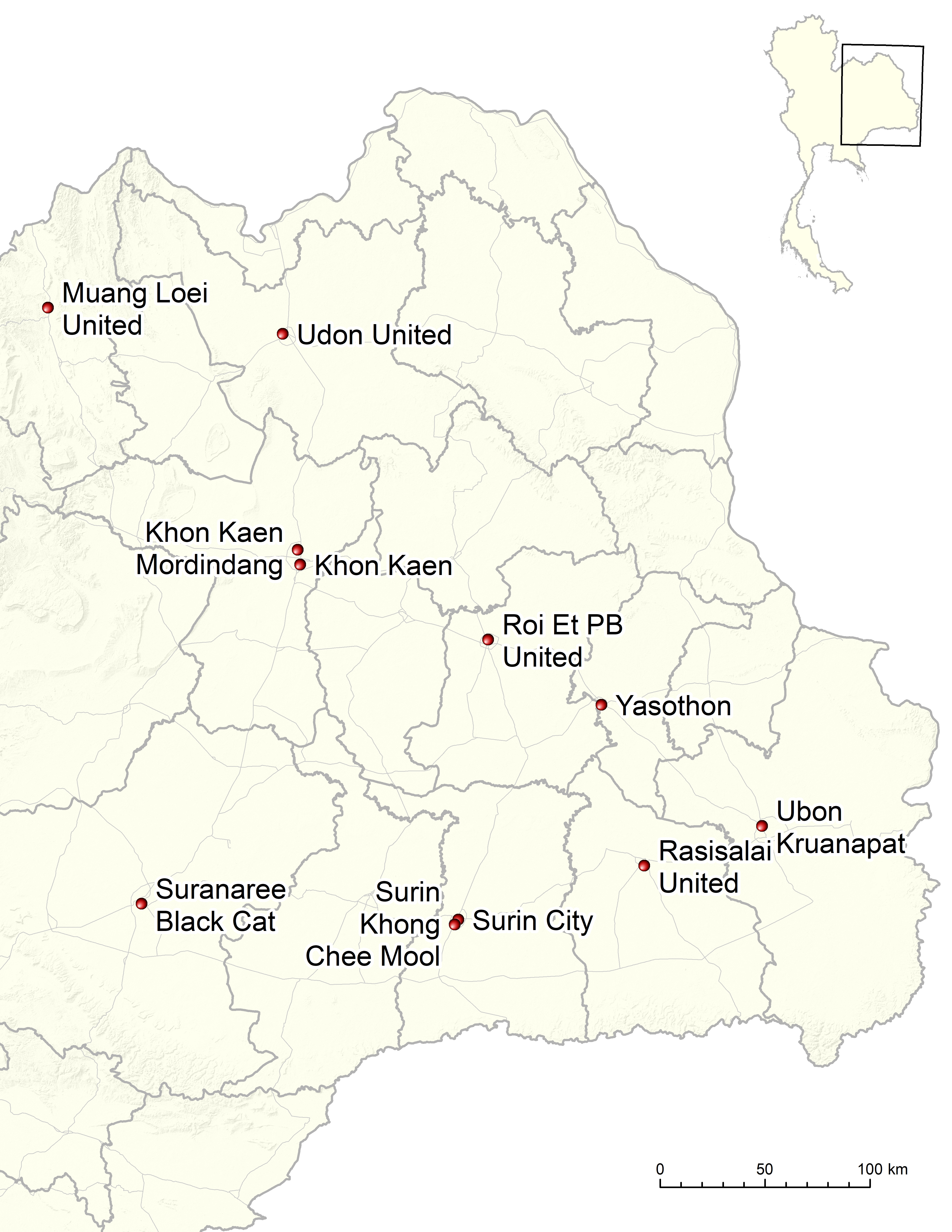
Locations of the 2024–25 Thai League 3 Northeastern Region clubs.

Position	Province	Number	Teams
1	Khon Kaen	2	Khon Kaen and Khon Kaen Mordindang
1	Surin	2	Surin City and Surin Khong Chee Mool
3	Loei	1	Muang Loei United
3	Nakhon Ratchasima	1	Suranaree Black Cat
3	Roi Et	1	Roi Et PB United
3	Sisaket	1	Rasisalai United
3	Ubon Ratchathani	1	Ubon Kruanapat
3	Udon Thani	1	Udon United
3	Yasothon	1	Yasothon

=== Stadiums and locations ===
Team	Location	Stadium	Coordinates
Khon Kaen	Khon Kaen (Mueang)	Khon Kaen PAO. Stadium	16°24′46″N 102°49′40″E
Khon Kaen Mordindang	Khon Kaen (Mueang)	Stadium of Khon Kaen University	16°28′36″N 102°49′04″E
Muang Loei United	Loei (Mueang)	Stadium of Loei Rajabhat University	17°32′08″N 101°43′12″E
Rasisalai United	Sisaket (Mueang)	Sisaket Provincial Stadium	15°05′21″N 104°19′25″E
Roi Et PB United	Roi Et (Mueang)	Roi Et Provincial Stadium	16°04′27″N 103°39′22″E
Suranaree Black Cat	Nakhon Ratchasima (Mueang)	Stadium of Fort Suranaree	14°57′59″N 102°05′58″E
Surin City	Surin (Mueang)	Sri Narong Stadium	14°52′30″N 103°29′50″E
Surin Khong Chee Mool	Surin (Mueang)	Stadium of Rajamangala University of Technology Isan, Surin Campus	14°51′15″N 103°28′53″E
Ubon Kruanapat	Ubon Ratchathani (Mueang)	Stadium of Ubon Ratchathani Rajabhat University	15°14′45″N 104°50′51″E
Udon United	Udon Thani (Mueang)	Stadium of Thailand National Sports University, Udon Thani Campus	17°24′20″N 102°46′09″E
Yasothon	Yasothon (Mueang)	Yasothon PAO. Stadium	15°46′58″N 104°09′06″E

=== Personnel and sponsoring ===
Note: Flags indicate national team as has been defined under FIFA eligibility rules. Players may hold more than one non-FIFA nationality; Club dissolved during season would shown by grey background.

Team	Manager	Captain	Kit
Khon Kaen	(Thailand) Pichet Suphomuang	TBA	(Thailand) Grand Sport
Khon Kaen Mordindang	(Thailand) Anucha Chuaysri	TBA	(Thailand) TW Sport
Suranaree Black Cat	(Thailand) Potsawee Meepoungpin	(Thailand) Supawat Srithong	(Thailand) 2S Sport
Rasisalai United	(Thailand) Arnon Bandasak		(Thailand) Energy Sport
Roi Et PB United	(Thailand) Pramoul Thinkatork		(Thailand) PB Design
Surin City	(Thailand) Tanut Pattaramaneesre		(Thailand) MySport Design
Surin Khong Chee Mool	(Thailand) Apisit Im-Amphai		(Thailand) Energy Sport
Muang Loei United	(Thailand) Teeratada Chumrus	(Thailand) Chaiwat Ritthisak	(Thailand) PB Design
Ubon Kruanapat	(Thailand) Kittiyuth Phutthakru		(Thailand) Charlenger
Udon United	(Thailand) Surachai Jirasirichote	TBA	(Thailand) Ego Sport
Yasothon	(Thailand) Jakkapob Kattiwong		(Thailand) Tako Sport

=== Foreign players ===
A T3 team could register 3 foreign players from foreign players all around the world. A team can use 3 foreign players on the field in each game.

Note :
(substituted off) : players who released during second leg transfer window;
(substituted on) : players who registered during second leg transfer window.

AFC member countries players.
CAF member countries players.
CONCACAF member countries players.
CONMEBOL member countries players.
OFC member countries players.
UEFA member countries players.
No foreign player registered.

Club	Leg	Player 1	Player 2	Player 3
Khon Kaen	1st	(Brazil) Jhonata Pereira dos Santos (substituted off)	(Brazil) Jonathan Monteiro	(Brazil) João Guimarães
Khon Kaen	2nd		(Brazil) Jonathan Monteiro	(Brazil) João Guimarães
Khon Kaen Mordindang	1st
Khon Kaen Mordindang	2nd
Muang Loei United	1st	(Sweden) Selwan Al-Jaberi (substituted off)	(Laos) Mitsada Saitaifah (substituted off)	(Nigeria) Aliu Micheal Abdul
Muang Loei United	2nd	(Azerbaijan) Mammad Guliyev (substituted on)	(Cameroon) Abbo Bouba (substituted on)	(Nigeria) Aliu Micheal Abdul
Rasisalai United	1st	(Brazil) Alberto Moreira Gouvea	(Brazil) Ramon Mesquita	(Brazil) Gilberto Macena
Rasisalai United	2nd	(Brazil) Alberto Moreira Gouvea	(Brazil) Ramon Mesquita	(Brazil) Gilberto Macena
Roi Et PB United	1st	(Brazil) Mairon Natan Pereira Maciel Oliveira (substituted off)	(Brazil) Célio Guilherme da Silva Santos (substituted off)	(Brazil) Andrey Coutinho
Roi Et PB United	2nd		(Brazil) Diego Silva (substituted on)	(Brazil) Andrey Coutinho
Suranaree Black Cat	1st	(United States) Christian Joseph Sacchini (substituted off)	(South Korea) Lee Geon-woo	(South Korea) Ahn Eung-wan
Suranaree Black Cat	2nd		(South Korea) Lee Geon-woo	(South Korea) Ahn Eung-wan
Surin City	1st
Surin City	2nd
Surin Khong Chee Mool	1st	(Argentina) Leonardo Martín Ferrari (substituted off)
Surin Khong Chee Mool	2nd	(Nigeria) Riliwan Omolaja Okedara (substituted on)	(Cameroon) Tengemo Emmanuel (substituted on)	(Ghana) Prince Boadu (substituted on)
Ubon Kruanapat	1st	(Nigeria) Jibril Antala Abubakar (substituted off)	(Republic of the Congo) Kabangu Nathan (substituted off)	(Ghana) Oscar Plape (substituted off)
Ubon Kruanapat	2nd		(Cameroon) Mbongo'o ii Aime Boris (substituted on)	(South Korea) Choi Min-seok (substituted on)
Udon United	1st	(Brazil) Jhonatan Bernardo (substituted off)	(South Korea) Lee Ho-been (substituted off)	(South Korea) Kim Jae-min
Udon United	2nd	(Brazil) Aroldo da Silva Arruda (substituted on)	(Brazil) Luiz Júnior (substituted on)	(South Korea) Kim Jae-min
Yasothon	1st	(Nigeria) James Oise Jesuikhode (substituted off)	(Sierra Leone) Serry Issa (substituted off)	(Nigeria) Julius Chukwuma Ononiwu
Yasothon	2nd		(Ghana) Sarfo Otis Adjei (substituted on)	(Nigeria) Julius Chukwuma Ononiwu

== League table ==
=== Standings ===
Pos	Team	Pld	W	D	L	GF	GA	GD	Pts	Qualification or relegation
1	Rasisalai United (C, Q)	20	16	3	1	66	14	+52	51	Qualification to the National Championship stage
2	Khon Kaen (Q)	20	12	4	4	32	14	+18	40	Qualification to the National Championship stage
3	Udon United	20	9	9	2	28	13	+15	36	
4	Ubon Kruanapat	20	10	3	7	31	20	+11	33	
5	Muang Loei United	20	6	8	6	22	22	0	26	
6	Roi Et PB United	20	7	3	10	25	31	−6	24	
7	Yasothon	20	5	5	10	21	39	−18	20	
8	Suranaree Black Cat	20	5	4	11	17	32	−15	19	
9	Surin City	20	2	12	6	14	19	−5	18 (Note: The head-to-head record is tied; Surin City 2 pts (GD 0, GF 1), Surin Khong Chee Mool 2 pts (GD 0, GF 1). Surin City is ahead on the overall goals difference.)	
10	Surin Khong Chee Mool	20	5	3	12	23	51	−28	18	
11	Khon Kaen Mordindang (Note: Following Rasisalai United's promotion to Thai League 2, Khon Kaen Mordindang remained in Thai League 3 to preserve the number of participating clubs in the Northeastern region.)	20	5	2	13	22	46	−24	17	

Source: Thai League
Rules for classification: 1) Points; 2) Head-to-head points; 3) Head-to-head goal difference; 4) Head-to-head goal scored; 5) Overall goal difference; 6) Overall goal scored; 7) Fair play points; 8) Play-off without extra time).
(C) Champions; (Q) Qualified for the phase indicated

=== Positions by round ===
Team ╲ Round	1	2	3	4	5	6	7	8	9	10	11	12	13	14	15	16	17	18	19	20	21	22
Rasisalai United	1	1	1	1	1	1	1	1	1	1	1	1	1	1	1	1	1	1	1	1	1	1
Khon Kaen	2	5	8	8	10	9	8	6	3	3	4	4	3	3	3	3	3	3	2	2	2	2
Udon United	7	2	3	3	4	2	2	3	2	2	2	2	2	2	2	2	2	2	3	3	3	3
Ubon Kruanapat	10	4	6	6	8	6	7	5	7	7	7	6	5	4	4	4	4	4	4	4	4	4
Muang Loei United	6	9	5	4	3	4	5	7	8	6	5	5	7	5	6	5	5	5	5	5	5	5
Roi Et PB United	8	10	7	7	5	5	6	8	6	4	3	3	4	6	7	7	7	7	7	6	6	6
Yasothon	3	6	2	2	2	3	3	2	4	5	6	7	6	7	5	6	6	6	6	7	7	7
Suranaree Black Cat	4	8	10	10	9	10	10	9	9	9	10	9	9	10	10	10	9	9	10	10	10	8
Surin City	5	3	4	5	6	7	4	4	5	8	8	8	8	8	8	8	8	8	8	8	8	9
Surin Khong Chee Mool	9	11	11	11	11	11	11	11	11	11	11	11	11	11	11	11	11	11	11	11	11	10
Khon Kaen Mordindang	11	7	9	9	7	8	9	10	10	10	9	10	10	9	9	9	10	10	9	9	9	11

Source: Thai League
= Qualification to the National Championship stage; = Relegation to the Thailand Semi-pro League

=== Results by round ===
Team ╲ Round	1	2	3	4	5	6	7	8	9	10	11	12	13	14	15	16	17	18	19	20	21	22
Rasisalai United	W	W	W	W	W	W	W	W	W	N	W	W	W	D	D	D	L	W	W	N	W	W
Khon Kaen	W	L	L	L	L	D	W	W	W	W	N	D	W	D	W	W	W	W	W	D	N	W
Udon United	D	W	D	W	L	W	D	N	W	W	W	D	D	W	D	W	W	N	L	D	D	D
Ubon Kruanapat	L	W	L	D	L	W	N	W	L	D	L	W	W	W	W	D	N	W	W	W	L	L
Muang Loei United	D	L	W	W	D	L	D	L	N	W	W	L	L	W	L	D	W	D	N	D	D	D
Roi Et PB United	N	L	W	L	W	D	D	L	W	W	W	D	L	L	L	L	L	L	L	W	W	N
Yasothon	W	L	W	W	D	N	D	D	L	D	L	L	W	L	W	N	L	D	L	L	L	L
Suranaree Black Cat	D	L	L	N	W	L	L	W	L	L	L	W	L	N	L	D	W	D	L	L	D	W
Surin City	D	W	D	D	N	D	W	D	L	L	L	D	D	L	N	D	D	D	L	D	D	L
Surin Khong Chee Mool	L	N	L	L	L	D	L	L	W	L	L	N	L	L	W	D	L	L	W	D	W	W
Khon Kaen Mordindang	L	W	N	L	W	L	L	L	L	L	W	L	N	W	L	L	D	L	W	D	L	L

Source: Thai League
N = No match; W = Won; D = Drawn; L = Lost

=== Results ===
Home \ Away	KKN	KKM	MLU	RSL	REU	SBC	SRC	KCM	UBK	UDU	YST
Khon Kaen	—	2–0	2–0	1–3	1–1	2–0	1–0	5–0	2–0	1–1	2–0
Khon Kaen Mordindang	0–1	—	2–2	2–4	2–4	1–0	1–3	1–0	2–1	0–4	3–1
Muang Loei United	1–0	3–0	—	1–1	1–0	0–1	1–1	2–1	0–1	0–0	1–1
Rasisalai United	0–0	9–1	4–0	—	6–1	2–3	2–0	8–0	2–1	5–1	3–0
Roi Et PB United	2–4	0–1	0–0	0–3	—	2–0	1–1	3–0	2–1	0–3	4–1
Suranaree Black Cat	1–0	2–1	2–2	1–4	0–1	—	2–2	0–1	2–2	0–0	0–2
Surin City	1–1	0–0	0–2	1–2	2–1	0–1	—	0–0	0–1	0–0	1–1
Surin Khong Chee Mool	0–2	3–2	0–4	0–4	3–2	3–1	1–1	—	1–2	1–4	1–2
Ubon Kruanapat	1–2	2–1	4–1	1–2	1–0	2–0	0–0	5–0	—	1–0	2–2
Udon United	3–1	3–1	0–0	0–0	1–0	3–0	0–0	1–1	1–0	—	1–0
Yasothon	0–2	2–1	2–1	0–2	0–1	2–1	1–1	2–7	0–3	2–2	—

Source: Thai League
Legend: Blue = home team win; Yellow = draw; Red = away team win.
For upcoming matches, an "a" indicates there is an article about the rivalry between the two participants.

== Season statistics ==
=== Top scorers ===
As of 30 March 2025.

Rank	Player	Club	Goals
1	(Brazil) Alberto Moreira Gouvea	Rasisalai United	18
2	(Brazil) Gilberto Macena	Rasisalai United	11
3	(Thailand) Supab Muengchan	Rasisalai United	9
4	(Thailand) Natchanon Yongsakool	Rasisalai United	8
4	(Thailand) Tirawut Thiwato	Surin Khong Chee Mool (8 Goals)	8

=== Hat-tricks ===
Player	For	Against	Result	Date
(Thailand) Natchanon Yongsakool	Rasisalai United	Khon Kaen Mordindang	9–1 (H)	14 September 2024
(Nigeria) Michael Aliu	Muang Loei United	Khon Kaen Mordindang	3–0 (H)	17 November 2024
(Thailand) Tirawut Thiwato	Surin Khong Chee Mool	Khon Kaen Mordindang	3–2 (H)	23 March 2025
(Thailand) Tirawut Thiwato	Surin Khong Chee Mool	Yasothon	2–7 (A)	30 March 2025
(Cameroon) Emmanuel Tengemo^{4}	Surin Khong Chee Mool	Yasothon	2–7 (A)	30 March 2025

=== Clean sheets ===
As of 30 March 2025.

Rank	Player	Club	Clean sheets
1	(Thailand) Adisak Boonthawi	Udon United	12
2	(Thailand) Bunditvicha Nongngok	Khon Kaen	8
2	(Thailand) Sakkongpop Sukprasert	Rasisalai United	8
2	(Thailand) Ratchanasak Buarapha	Ubon Kruanapat	8
5	(Thailand) Panupan Juheang	Muang Loei United	5
5	(Thailand) Jeerasak Phananut	Surin City	5

== Attendances ==
=== Overall statistical table ===
Pos	Team	Total	High	Low	Average	Change
1	Roi Et PB United	7,994	1,288	250	799	+50.8%^{↑}
2	Khon Kaen	6,298	802	444	630	+40.0%
3	Rasisalai United	4,484	759	233	448	+118.5%
4	Yasothon	3,821	650	0	425	+44.1%
5	Ubon Kruanapat	3,234	459	220	323	−20.4%
6	Khon Kaen Mordindang	2,666	346	150	267	−2.9%
7	Udon United	2,445	350	97	245	−13.7%
8	Muang Loei United	2,034	403	87	203	−27.5%
9	Surin City	1,983	301	89	198	−16.1%
10	Suranaree Black Cat	1,967	720	37	197	+99.0%
11	Surin Khong Chee Mool	1,292	267	25	129	+38.7%
	League total	38,218	1,288	0	351	+14.0%

Updated to games played on 30 March 2025
Source: Thai League

=== Attendances by home match played ===
Team \ Match played	1	2	3	4	5	6	7	8	9	10	Total
Khon Kaen	656	635	791	532	484	658	656	444	802	640	6,298
Khon Kaen Mordindang	236	250	248	195	346	150	450	263	232	296	2,666
Muang Loei United	403	317	258	171	281	87	150	97	150	120	2,034
Rasisalai United	350	450	459	233	559	420	259	570	759	425	4,484
Roi Et PB United	325	443	1,288	1,120	1,250	880	650	1,270	250	518	7,994
Suranaree Black Cat	300	67	230	720	37	150	58	48	107	250	1,967
Surin City	301	248	223	143	201	300	123	105	250	89	1,983
Surin Khong Chee Mool	113	136	25	50	187	250	121	43	100	267	1,292
Ubon Kruanapat	258	374	220	222	227	428	428	329	459	289	3,234
Udon United	342	350	97	337	261	219	218	219	165	237	2,445
Yasothon	500	500	500	480	650	450	150	348	243	Unk.1	3,821

Note:
Unk.1 Some error of T3 official match report 30 March 2025 (Yasothon 2–7 Surin Khong Chee Mool).
