= 2025–26 Thai League 3 Northeastern Region =

Thai League 3 Northeastern Region
- Season: 2025–26
- Dates: 13 September 2025 – 22 March 2026
- Champions: Muang Loei United
- Relegated: Surin Khong Chee Mool
- T3 National Championship: Muang Loei United; Udon United
- Matches: 132
- Goals: 346 (2.62 per match)
- Top goalscorer: (Thailand) Sihanart Suttisak (12 goals; Muang Loei United)
- Best goalkeeper: (Thailand) Thanakorn Korkaew (10 clean sheets; Surin City)
- Biggest home win: 8 goals difference Muang Loei United 8–0 Korat City (1 November 2025)
- Biggest away win: 7 goals difference Udon Banjan United 0–7 Udon United (10 February 2026)
- Highest scoring: 8 goals difference Muang Loei United 8–0 Korat City (1 November 2025)
- Longest winning run: 5 matches Muang Loei United; Surin City
- Longest unbeaten run: 14 matches Muang Loei United
- Longest winless run: 10 matches Surin Khong Chee Mool
- Longest losing run: 7 matches Khon Kaen Mordindang
- Highest attendance: 1,889; Roi Et PB United 4–1 Surin Khong Chee Mool (14 September 2025)
- Lowest attendance: 40; Surin Khong Chee Mool 1–4 Muang Loei United (22 November 2025)
- Total attendance: 59,796
- Average attendance: 456

The 2025–26 Thai League 3 Northeastern Region was part of the 2025–26 Thai League 3 Regional Stage, consisting of 12 clubs located in the northeastern region (Isan) of Thailand. The season commenced on 13 September 2025, with clubs competing in a round-robin format featuring home-and-away matches. The Regional Stage concluded on 22 March 2026, with the top two clubs advancing to the National Championship Stage, while the bottom-placed club was relegated to the Thailand Semi-pro League for the following season.

== Seasonal Changes ==
The 2025–26 Thai League 3 season features a number of changes compared to the previous campaign. These include the promotion and relegation of clubs between divisions, several club renamings and rebrandings, and the introduction of a new title sponsor, BYD Auto, which rebranded the competition as the BYD Dolphin League III for sponsorship reasons.

=== Promotions from Thailand Semi-pro League ===
Normally, the champions of each of the six regional groups of the 2025 Thailand Semi-pro League would be promoted to the Thai League 3. However, in the Western region, the champions, The Wall, failed club licensing and were denied promotion. As a result, only five regional champions earned direct promotion, with several additional clubs promoted under special quotas due to licensing issues and adjustments to balance the number of teams in each group. Clubs promotion in the Northeastern region:

- Udon Banjan United – promoted as regional champions.
- EUMT – promoted as runners-up under a special quota, as the group expanded from 11 to 12 teams. In addition, relegated side Khon Kaen Mordindang were reprieved due to Rasisalai United's promotion to Thai League 2.

=== Promotion to Thai League 2 ===
Rasisalai United, the 2024–25 national champion, earned promotion to Thai League 2, representing a significant loss of a strong competitor for the region. As a result, no club was relegated from the Thai League 3 Northeastern region, as the bottom-placed side was allowed to remain for balance.

=== Sponsorship and Broadcasting ===
In the 2025–26 season, Thai League 3 will operate under a title sponsorship arrangement for the first time: BYD Auto (through BYD Rêver Thailand) has become the main sponsor for all three professional tiers in Thailand, including Thai League 3, rebranding it as the BYD Dolphin League III.

On the broadcasting side, a landmark media rights deal was struck, giving AIS Play (in partnership with Gulf and JAS) exclusive rights to stream all matches from Thai Leagues 1, 2, and 3, plus domestic cups and youth competitions for the 2025–26 through 2028–29 seasons. Under this agreement, Thai League 3 matches can be watched live for free via AIS Play, and fans will no longer rely solely on individual clubs' streaming efforts (e.g., via YouTube or Facebook), as they did in previous seasons.

=== Club name and logo changes ===
2 clubs have rebranded or changed their logos for the 2025–26 season of the Thai League 3 Northeastern region:

- Korat City, formerly known as Suranaree Black Cat, underwent a rebranding before the 2025–26 Thai League 3 season. The change included both a new club name and a redesigned crest. The previous emblem, which featured a stylized black cat head in a minimalist design, was replaced with a modern shield-shaped logo that displays a grey cat head with a fierce expression under the banner Wonder Cat Korat City.
- Udon United, introduced a new crest ahead of the 2025–26 season. The previous logo featured a fox head design with white markings on the mouth and eyebrows on a bright yellow background. It was replaced with a simplified version that retains the fox head motif but with darker tones and a deeper yellow background, while maintaining the inscription "Since 2018" at the bottom of the shield.

== Teams ==
=== Number of teams by province ===
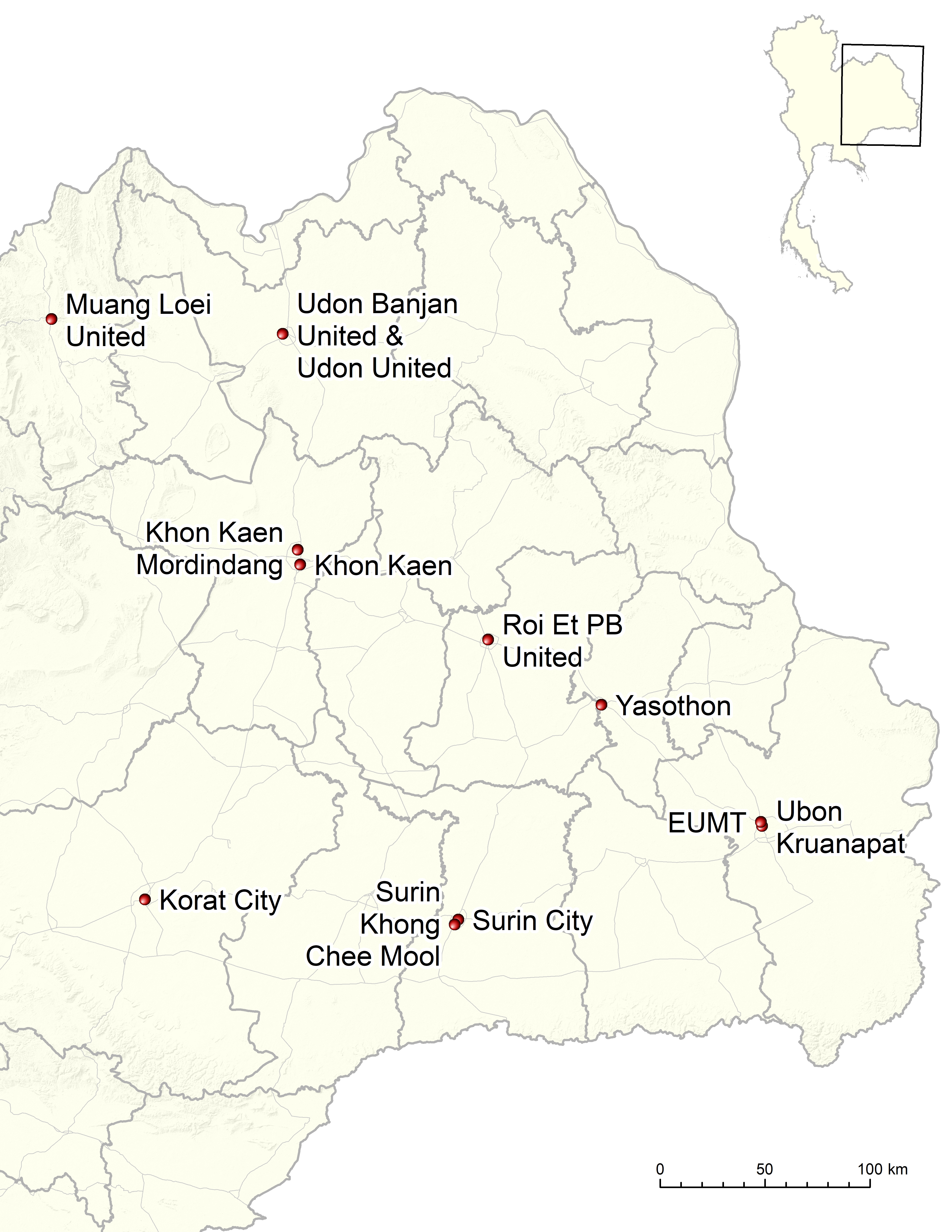
Locations of the 2025–26 Thai League 3 Northeastern Region clubs.

Position	Province	Number	Teams
1	Khon Kaen	2	Khon Kaen and Khon Kaen Mordindang
1	Surin	2	Surin City and Surin Khong Chee Mool
1	Ubon Ratchathani	2	EUMT and Ubon Kruanapat
1	Udon Thani	2	Udon Banjan United and Udon United
5	Loei	1	Muang Loei United
5	Nakhon Ratchasima	1	Korat City
5	Roi Et	1	Roi Et PB United
5	Yasothon	1	Yasothon

=== Stadiums and locations ===
Team	Location	Stadium	Coordinates
EUMT	Ubon Ratchathani (Mueang)	UMT Stadium	15°15′49″N 104°50′35″E
Khon Kaen	Khon Kaen (Mueang)	Khon Kaen PAO. Stadium	16°24′46″N 102°49′40″E
Khon Kaen Mordindang	Khon Kaen (Mueang)	Stadium of Khon Kaen University	16°28′36″N 102°49′04″E
Korat City	Nakhon Ratchasima (Mueang)	Stadium of Nakhon Ratchasima Rajabhat University	14°59′07″N 102°06′53″E
Muang Loei United	Loei (Mueang)	Loei Provincial Stadium	17°29′09″N 101°44′06″E
Roi Et PB United	Roi Et (Mueang)	Roi Et Provincial Stadium	16°04′27″N 103°39′22″E
Surin City	Surin (Mueang)	Sri Narong Stadium	14°52′30″N 103°29′50″E
Surin Khong Chee Mool	Surin (Mueang)	Stadium of Rajamangala University of Technology Isan, Surin Campus	14°51′15″N 103°28′53″E
Ubon Kruanapat	Ubon Ratchathani (Mueang)	Stadium of Ubon Ratchathani Rajabhat University	15°14′45″N 104°50′51″E
Udon Banjan United	Udon Thani (Mueang)	Stadium of Thailand National Sports University, Udon Thani Campus	17°24′20″N 102°46′09″E
Udon United	Udon Thani (Mueang)	Stadium of Thailand National Sports University, Udon Thani Campus	17°24′20″N 102°46′09″E
Yasothon	Yasothon (Mueang)	Yasothon PAO. Stadium	15°46′58″N 104°09′06″E

=== Foreign players ===
A T3 team could register 3 foreign players from foreign players all around the world. A team can use 3 foreign players on the field in each game.

Note :
(substituted off) : players who released during second leg transfer window;
(substituted on) : players who registered during second leg transfer window.

AFC member countries players.
CAF member countries players.
CONCACAF member countries players.
CONMEBOL member countries players.
OFC member countries players.
UEFA member countries players.
No foreign player registered.

Club	Leg	Player 1	Player 2	Player 3
EUMT	1st	(Brazil) Gomes Santos Pires Matheus (substituted off)	(Argentina) Matías Verón (substituted off)	(Ghana) Abdul Kharim Ayeh
EUMT	2nd	(Brazil) Osvaldo Nascimento dos Santos Neto (substituted on)	(Brazil) Danilo (substituted on)	(Ghana) Abdul Kharim Ayeh
Khon Kaen	1st	(Brazil) John Caio Camargo Silva (substituted off)	(Brazil) Ricardo Pires	(Brazil) Jonathan Monteiro
Khon Kaen	2nd	(Brazil) Patrick Silva Mota (substituted on)	(Brazil) Ricardo Pires	(Brazil) Jonathan Monteiro
Khon Kaen Mordindang	1st
Khon Kaen Mordindang	2nd
Korat City	1st	(France) Mabiala Gaël Cedric (substituted off)	(Nigeria) Ugonna Brian Maduagwu (substituted off)	(South Korea) Noh Yeong-hun (substituted off)
Korat City	2nd			(South Korea) Ha Jun-seo (substituted on)
Muang Loei United	1st	(Egypt) Abdelrahman Osama Mohamed (substituted off)	(Brazil) Marciano de Oliveira Filho Odair	(Japan) Issei Kikuchi
Muang Loei United	2nd	(Brazil) Lucas Massaro Garcia Gama (substituted on)	(Brazil) Marciano de Oliveira Filho Odair	(Japan) Issei Kikuchi
Roi Et PB United	1st	(Brazil) Pedro Augusto Silva Rodrigues (substituted off)	(South Korea) Jung Hyeon-gu (substituted off)	(South Korea) Lim Jae-hyuk
Roi Et PB United	2nd	(South Korea) Oh Sung-jin (substituted on)	(Iraq) Selwan Al-Jaberi (substituted on)	(South Korea) Lim Jae-hyuk
Surin City	1st	(Japan) Yuto Yoshijima (substituted off)	(South Korea) Ahn Eung-wan (substituted off)	(South Korea) Mun Te-su (substituted off)
Surin City	2nd
Surin Khong Chee Mool	1st	(Cameroon) Tengemo Emmanuel (substituted off)	(Sierra Leone) Conteh Samson (substituted off)	(Cameroon) Mfogham Nsangou Seidou
Surin Khong Chee Mool	2nd	(Colombia) David Alberto Palomino Cartagena (substituted on)	(Cameroon) David Caleb Lienou Ngameni (substituted on)	(Cameroon) Mfogham Nsangou Seidou
Ubon Kruanapat	1st		(Cameroon) Mbongo'o ii Aime Boris (substituted off)	(South Korea) Park Min-heum (substituted off)
Ubon Kruanapat	2nd	(South Korea) Cho Han-uk (substituted on)	(South Korea) Min Shin (substituted on)	(Vietnam) Kenny Chandler Phi Hoang (substituted on)
Udon Banjan United	1st	(Brazil) Emerson Christian Adolfo (substituted off)	(Brazil) Halef Pitbull (substituted off)	(Brazil) João Guimarães
Udon Banjan United	2nd	(Brazil) Felipe Micael (substituted on)	(Cameroon) Mbongo'o ii Aime Boris (substituted on)	(Brazil) João Guimarães
Udon United	1st	(Finland) Sakari Tukiainen (substituted off)	(Japan) Taiga Matsunaga (substituted off)	(Brazil) Victor Clemente de Oliveira Capinan
Udon United	2nd	(Brazil) Elias (substituted on)	(Ghana) Kwame Karikari (substituted on)	(Brazil) Victor Clemente de Oliveira Capinan
Yasothon	1st		(Cameroon) Chriss Axel Okala (substituted off)	(Sierra Leone) Serry Issa (substituted off)
Yasothon	2nd	(England) Duval Alanzo Donaldson (substituted on)	(Cameroon) Isaac Honore Aime Mbengan (substituted on)	(Chinese Taipei) Anthony Huang (substituted on)

== League table ==
=== Standings ===
Pos	Team	Pld	W	D	L	GF	GA	GD	Pts	Qualification or relegation
1	Muang Loei United (C, Q)	22	14	7	1	49	21	+28	49	Qualification to the National Championship stage
2	Udon United (Q)	22	13	6	3	48	23	+25	45	Qualification to the National Championship stage
3	Khon Kaen	22	11	8	3	32	13	+19	41	
4	EUMT	22	7	12	3	28	16	+12	33 (Note: EUMT ahead on head-to-head points record; EUMT 4 pts, Ubon Kruanapat 1 pt.)	
5	Ubon Kruanapat	22	9	6	7	28	28	0	33	
6	Surin City	22	8	8	6	25	22	+3	32 (Note: Surin City ahead on head-to-head points record; Surin City 4 pts, Roi Et PB United 1 pt.)	
7	Roi Et PB United	22	8	8	6	28	21	+7	32	
8	Udon Banjan United	22	8	5	9	22	31	−9	29	
9	Yasothon	22	6	6	10	28	33	−5	24	
10	Korat City	22	4	4	14	24	51	−27	16	
11	Khon Kaen Mordindang	22	3	3	16	18	40	−22	12	
12	Surin Khong Chee Mool (R)	22	2	5	15	16	47	−31	11	Relegation to the Thailand Semi-pro League

Source: Thai League
Rules for classification: 1) Points; 2) Head-to-head points; 3) Head-to-head goal difference; 4) Head-to-head goal scored; 5) Overall goal difference; 6) Overall goal scored; 7) Fair play points; 8) Play-off without extra time).
(C) Champions; (Q) Qualified for the phase indicated; (R) Relegated

=== Positions by round ===
Team ╲ Round	1	2	3	4	5	6	7	8	9	10	11	12	13	14	15	16	17	18	19	20	21	22
Muang Loei United	5	4	2	4	4	3	5	4	4	4	3	3	2	2	2	2	2	2	2	2	1	1
Udon United	4	2	3	1	1	1	1	1	1	1	1	1	1	1	1	1	1	1	1	1	2	2
Khon Kaen	8	9	7	3	3	6	4	3	3	2	2	2	3	3	3	3	3	3	3	3	3	3
EUMT	2	3	4	5	5	4	3	5	5	5	5	6	6	6	6	6	5	4	4	5	4	4
Ubon Kruanapat	7	7	8	6	6	5	7	7	7	9	8	8	8	8	9	9	9	8	9	8	6	5
Surin City	6	8	10	11	11	12	10	9	9	8	7	4	7	7	8	8	7	5	5	4	5	6
Roi Et PB United	1	5	5	7	8	8	8	8	8	6	9	7	4	4	4	4	6	7	7	6	7	7
Udon Banjan United	3	1	1	2	2	2	2	2	2	3	4	5	5	5	5	5	4	6	6	7	8	8
Yasothon	9	10	9	9	9	7	6	6	6	7	6	9	9	9	7	7	8	9	8	9	9	9
Korat City	10	6	6	8	7	9	9	11	11	11	11	10	10	10	10	11	11	11	10	10	10	10
Khon Kaen Mordindang	11	12	12	10	10	10	11	12	12	12	12	12	12	11	11	10	10	10	12	12	12	11
Surin Khong Chee Mool	12	11	11	12	12	11	12	10	10	10	10	11	11	12	12	12	12	12	11	11	11	12

Source: Thai League
= Qualification to the National Championship stage; = Relegation to the Thailand Semi-pro League

=== Results by round ===
Team ╲ Round	1	2	3	4	5	6	7	8	9	10	11	12	13	14	15	16	17	18	19	20	21	22
Muang Loei United	W	D	W	D	D	D	W	L	W	D	W	D	W	W	W	W	D	W	W	W	W	W
Udon United	W	W	D	W	W	W	D	L	W	W	W	W	D	W	D	W	D	W	W	L	L	D
Khon Kaen	L	D	W	W	D	L	W	W	W	W	D	D	D	W	D	W	W	W	L	W	D	D
EUMT	W	D	D	D	W	W	D	L	W	D	L	D	D	L	W	D	W	D	D	D	W	D
Ubon Kruanapat	D	D	L	W	D	W	L	D	W	L	W	D	D	L	L	W	L	W	L	W	W	W
Surin City	D	D	L	L	D	L	D	W	W	W	W	W	L	L	D	D	W	W	D	W	D	L
Roi Et PB United	W	L	D	L	L	D	D	D	W	W	D	W	W	W	D	L	L	D	L	W	D	W
Udon Banjan United	W	W	W	D	W	L	W	L	W	L	L	L	D	D	W	L	W	L	D	L	D	L
Yasothon	L	D	D	D	D	W	W	W	L	L	W	L	L	D	W	D	L	L	W	L	L	L
Korat City	L	W	D	L	D	L	L	L	L	L	L	W	D	L	L	L	L	L	W	L	W	D
Khon Kaen Mordindang	L	L	L	W	D	L	L	L	L	L	L	L	D	W	L	D	L	L	L	L	L	W
Surin Khong Chee Mool	L	L	D	L	L	W	L	D	L	L	L	L	D	L	L	L	W	L	D	D	L	L

Source: Thai League
W = Won; D = Drawn; L = Lost

=== Results ===
Home \ Away	EUM	KKN	KKM	KRC	MLU	REU	SRC	KCM	UBK	UDB	UDU	YST
EUMT	—	0–0	1–0	3–1	1–2	1–1	1–0	3–0	0–0	2–2	2–2	4–1
Khon Kaen	0–0	—	1–1	4–0	2–0	1–1	0–0	6–0	3–0	1–0	2–2	2–1
Khon Kaen Mordindang	0–3	0–1	—	1–2	2–2	0–1	0–2	1–0	0–3	0–2	0–1	1–1
Korat City	0–0	0–1	5–2	—	1–3	1–6	0–3	1–1	2–3	0–1	1–0	2–2
Muang Loei United	0–0	1–0	3–2	8–0	—	2–2	2–1	1–0	1–1	2–0	1–1	5–2
Roi Et PB United	1–1	2–2	2–1	0–2	2–3	—	1–1	4–1	1–0	1–0	0–1	0–0
Surin City	0–0	0–0	2–1	3–1	0–3	1–0	—	0–0	1–1	2–2	0–1	2–0
Surin Khong Chee Mool	2–2	1–0	0–2	2–2	1–4	0–1	0–1	—	1–2	0–3	1–2	2–4
Ubon Kruanapat	0–2	0–1	2–1	3–2	1–1	1–0	3–1	2–2	—	0–0	2–1	1–0
Udon Banjan United	2–1	1–2	1–2	2–1	1–3	1–0	1–4	2–0	1–0	—	0–7	0–0
Udon United	1–1	3–2	2–0	1–0	1–1	1–1	5–1	4–1	3–0	3–0	—	4–3
Yasothon	1–0	0–1	3–1	2–0	0–1	0–1	0–0	0–1	4–3	0–0	4–2	—

Source: Thai League
Legend: Blue = home team win; Yellow = draw; Red = away team win.
For upcoming matches, an "a" indicates there is an article about the rivalry between the two participants.
