= 2022–23 Thai League 3 Northeastern Region =

Thai League 3 Northeastern Region
- Season: 2022–23
- Dates: 10 September 2022 – 18 March 2023
- Champions: Mahasarakham SBT
- Relegated: Sakon Nakhon
- T3 National Championship: Mahasarakham SBT; Sisaket United
- Matches: 156
- Goals: 405 (2.6 per match)
- Top goalscorer: (Thailand) Supab Muengchan (18 goals; Rasisalai United)
- Best goalkeeper: (Thailand) Itthipon Kamsuprom (13 clean sheets; Sisaket United)
- Biggest home win: 6 goals difference Ubon Kruanapat 6–0 Sakon Nakhon (11 September 2022)
- Biggest away win: 6 goals difference Nakhon Ratchasima United 0–6 Rasisalai United (26 February 2023)
- Highest scoring: 7 goals Khon Kaen Mordindang 1–6 Muang Loei United (8 October 2022); Rasisalai United 6–1 Sakon Nakhon (13 November 2022); Khon Kaen Mordindang 2–5 Rasisalai United (5 February 2023); Sakon Nakhon 3–4 Nakhon Ratchasima United (18 February 2023); Rasisalai United 4–3 Udon United (8 March 2023)
- Longest winning run: 8 matches Rasisalai United
- Longest unbeaten run: 16 matches Mahasarakham SBT
- Longest winless run: 24 matches Sakon Nakhon
- Longest losing run: 9 matches Surin Khong Chee Mool
- Highest attendance: 11,444; Mahasarakham SBT 3–1 Yasothon (18 March 2023)
- Lowest attendance: 19; Surin Khong Chee Mool 0–0 Udon United (24 September 2022)
- Total attendance: 60,458
- Average attendance: 420

The 2022–23 Thai League 3 Northeastern region is a region in the regional stage of the 2022–23 Thai League 3. The tournament was sponsored by Kongsalak Plus, and known as the Kongsalak Plus League for sponsorship purposes. A total of 13 teams located in Northeastern of Thailand will compete in the league of the Northeastern region.

== Teams ==
=== Number of teams by province ===
Position	Province	Number	Teams
1	Khon Kaen	2	Khon Kaen and Khon Kaen Mordindang
1	Sisaket	2	Rasisalai United and Sisaket United
1	Surin	2	Surin City and Surin Khong Chee Mool
4	Loei	1	Muang Loei United
4	Maha Sarakham	1	Mahasarakham SBT
4	Nakhon Ratchasima	1	Nakhon Ratchasima United
4	Sakon Nakhon	1	Sakon Nakhon
4	Ubon Ratchathani	1	Ubon Kruanapat
4	Udon Thani	1	Udon United
4	Yasothon	1	Yasothon

=== Stadiums and locations ===
Locations of the 2022–23 Thai League 3 Northeastern region teams

Team	Location	Stadium	Coordinates
Khon Kaen	Khon Kaen (Mueang)	Khon Kaen PAO. Stadium	16°24′46″N 102°49′40″E
Khon Kaen Mordindang	Khon Kaen (Mueang)	Stadium of Khon Kaen University	16°28′36″N 102°49′04″E
Mahasarakham SBT	Mahasarakham (Mueang)	Mahasarakham Provincial Stadium	16°09′15″N 103°18′59″E
Muang Loei United	Loei (Mueang)	Kongsalak Plus Stadium	17°30′50″N 101°43′11″E
Nakhon Ratchasima United	Nakhon Ratchasima (Mueang)	Stadium of Nakhon Ratchasima Rajabhat University	14°59′07″N 102°06′53″E
Rasisalai United	Sisaket (Mueang)	Sisaket Provincial Stadium	15°05′21″N 104°19′25″E
Sakon Nakhon	Sakon Nakhon (Mueang)	Sakon Nakhon Provincial Stadium	17°12′04″N 104°06′22″E
Sisaket United	Sisaket (Mueang)	Sri Nakhon Lamduan Stadium	15°06′03″N 104°20′25″E
Surin City	Surin (Mueang)	Sri Narong Stadium	14°52′30″N 103°29′50″E
Surin Khong Chee Mool	Surin (Mueang)	Stadium of Rajamangala University of Technology Isan, Surin Campus	14°51′15″N 103°28′53″E
Ubon Kruanapat	Ubon Ratchathani (Khueang Nai)	Stadium of Ubon Ratchathani Rajabhat University, Ban Yang Noi Campus	15°20′58″N 104°37′46″E
Udon United	Udon Thani (Mueang)	Stadium of Thailand National Sports University, Udon Thani Campus	17°24′20″N 102°46′09″E
Yasothon	Yasothon (Mueang)	Yasothon PAO. Stadium	15°46′58″N 104°09′06″E

=== Foreign players ===
A T3 team could register 3 foreign players from foreign players all around the world. A team can use 3 foreign players on the field in each game.

Note :
(substituted off) : players who released during second leg transfer window;
(substituted in) : players who registered during second leg transfer window.

AFC member countries players.
CAF member countries players.
CONCACAF member countries players.
CONMEBOL member countries players.
OFC member countries players.
UEFA member countries players.
No foreign player registered.

Club	Leg	Player 1	Player 2	Player 3
Khon Kaen	1st	(Brazil) Caio dos Santos Vicente	(Brazil) Jonathan Monteiro	(Brazil) Judivan
Khon Kaen	2nd	(Brazil) Caio dos Santos Vicente	(Brazil) Jonathan Monteiro	(Brazil) Judivan
Khon Kaen Mordindang	1st
Khon Kaen Mordindang	2nd
Mahasarakham SBT	1st	(Brazil) Fellipe Cabral Veloso dos Santos (substituted off)	(Brazil) Tiago Chulapa (substituted off)	(Brazil) Artur (substituted off)
Mahasarakham SBT	2nd		(Brazil) Alberto Moreira Gouvea (substituted in)	(Brazil) Erivelto (substituted in)
Muang Loei United	1st	(Ivory Coast) Diarra Junior Aboubacar (substituted off)	(Brazil) Rafinha (substituted off)	(Japan) Omae So (substituted off)
Muang Loei United	2nd			(Mali) Ibrahim Konaré (substituted in)
Nakhon Ratchasima United	1st	(Egypt) Abdelrahman Bahgat Ali Abouzeid (substituted off)	(Ivory Coast) Bouda Henry Ismaël (substituted off)	(Pakistan) Mohib Ullah (substituted off)
Nakhon Ratchasima United	2nd		(Guinea) Abdoul Karim Sylla (substituted in)	(Guinea) Diop Badara Aly (substituted in)
Rasisalai United	1st	(Ivory Coast) Doukoure N'Gro Molaye (substituted off)
Rasisalai United	2nd	(Iran) Hamzeh Sari (substituted in)
Sakon Nakhon	1st	(Japan) Shunsuke Furusho (substituted off)	(Argentina) Panigazzi Matias Ignacio	(Argentina) Nicolás Torres
Sakon Nakhon	2nd	(Republic of the Congo) Kabangu Nathan (substituted in)	(Argentina) Panigazzi Matias Ignacio	(Argentina) Nicolás Torres
Sisaket United	1st	(Brazil) Osvaldo Nascimento dos Santos Neto	(Brazil) Romário Reginaldo Alves	(Brazil) Cristian Alex
Sisaket United	2nd	(Brazil) Osvaldo Nascimento dos Santos Neto	(Brazil) Romário Reginaldo Alves	(Brazil) Cristian Alex
Surin City	1st
Surin City	2nd
Surin Khong Chee Mool	1st	(Togo) Abass Ouro-Nimini (substituted off)
Surin Khong Chee Mool	2nd	(Argentina) Leonardo Martín Ferrari (substituted in)	(South Korea) Yu Jae-hyuk (substituted in)
Ubon Kruanapat	1st	(Brazil) Vinícius Silva Freitas (substituted off)	(Cameroon) David Martial Bayiha Ngan	(Ghana) Oscar Plape
Ubon Kruanapat	2nd	(Japan) Kenta Aso (substituted in)	(Cameroon) David Martial Bayiha Ngan	(Ghana) Oscar Plape
Udon United	1st	(Japan) Koike Akihiro (substituted off)	(Brazil) Ranieri Luiz Barbosa	(Brazil) Tufy Pina
Udon United	2nd		(Brazil) Ranieri Luiz Barbosa	(Brazil) Tufy Pina
Yasothon	1st	(Guinea) Diop Badara Aly (substituted off)	(Guinea) Abdoul Karim Sylla (substituted off)	(Nigeria) Michael Wellington
Yasothon	2nd	(Togo) Abass Ouro-Nimini (substituted in)	(Algeria) Bouchiba Chiheb Ennour (substituted in)	(Nigeria) Michael Wellington

== League table ==
=== Standings ===
Pos	Team	Pld	W	D	L	GF	GA	GD	Pts	Qualification or relegation
1	Mahasarakham SBT (C, Q)	24	15	7	2	40	17	+23	52	Qualification to the National Championship stage
2	Sisaket United (Q)	24	15	6	3	34	11	+23	51	Qualification to the National Championship stage
3	Rasisalai United	24	13	7	4	54	24	+30	46	
4	Khon Kaen	24	11	8	5	36	21	+15	41	
5	Ubon Kruanapat	24	11	5	8	35	30	+5	38	
6	Muang Loei United	24	9	9	6	38	28	+10	36	
7	Surin City	24	8	10	6	26	26	0	34	
8	Khon Kaen Mordindang	24	9	5	10	36	41	−5	32	
9	Udon United	24	7	8	9	24	26	−2	29	
10	Yasothon	24	4	10	10	20	33	−13	22	
11	Nakhon Ratchasima United	24	5	5	14	19	40	−21	20	
12	Surin Khong Chee Mool	24	4	4	16	25	48	−23	16	
13	Sakon Nakhon (R)	24	0	6	18	18	60	−42	6	Relegation to the Thailand Semi-Pro League

Source: Thai League
Rules for classification: 1) Points; 2) Head-to-head points; 3) Head-to-head goal difference; 4) Head-to-head goal scored; 5) Overall goal difference; 6) Overall goal scored; 7) Fair play points; 8) Play-off without extra time).
(C) Champions; (Q) Qualified for the phase indicated; (R) Relegated

=== Positions by round ===
Team ╲ Round	1	2	3	4	5	6	7	8	9	10	11	12	13	14	15	16	17	18	19	20	21	22	23	24	25	26
Mahasarakham SBT	5	4	5	6	8	3	6	4	5	3	2	2	3	2	2	2	2	2	2	2	1	1	1	1	1	1
Sisaket United	8	6	6	4	6	7	3	1	1	1	3	1	1	1	1	1	1	1	1	1	2	2	2	2	2	2
Rasisalai United	3	3	2	2	2	1	1	3	6	7	4	7	7	7	7	5	6	5	5	4	4	3	3	3	3	3
Khon Kaen	2	2	3	5	9	4	2	5	2	6	7	5	2	3	3	3	3	3	3	3	3	4	4	4	4	4
Ubon Kruanapat	1	5	8	9	7	8	9	8	7	4	5	6	5	5	4	4	4	4	4	5	5	5	8	6	6	5
Muang Loei United	7	10	4	7	4	9	5	6	4	5	6	4	6	6	6	7	7	7	7	7	6	6	6	5	5	6
Surin City	6	8	9	10	5	5	7	7	8	8	8	8	8	8	8	8	8	9	8	8	8	8	7	8	7	7
Khon Kaen Mordindang	4	1	1	1	1	2	4	2	3	2	1	3	4	4	5	6	5	6	6	6	7	7	5	7	8	8
Udon United	9	12	11	11	11	10	10	11	12	12	12	11	10	10	9	9	9	8	9	9	9	9	9	9	9	9
Yasothon	10	11	12	12	12	12	12	10	11	11	11	12	12	12	12	11	11	11	10	10	10	10	10	10	10	10
Nakhon Ratchasima United	12	9	10	8	10	11	11	12	10	10	10	9	11	11	11	12	12	12	12	12	11	11	11	11	11	11
Surin Khong Chee Mool	11	7	7	3	3	6	8	9	9	9	9	10	9	9	10	10	10	10	11	11	12	12	12	12	12	12
Sakon Nakhon	13	13	13	13	13	13	13	13	13	13	13	13	13	13	13	13	13	13	13	13	13	13	13	13	13	13

Source: Thai League
= Qualification to the National Championship stage; = Relegation to the Thailand Amateur League

=== Results by round ===
Team ╲ Round	1	2	3	4	5	6	7	8	9	10	11	12	13	14	15	16	17	18	19	20	21	22	23	24	25	26
Mahasarakham SBT	W	D	N	D	D	W	D	W	D	W	W	D	D	W	N	W	W	W	L	W	W	W	W	W	L	W
Sisaket United	L	W	D	W	N	D	W	W	W	D	D	W	D	W	W	W	N	W	L	W	D	L	W	W	W	W
Rasisalai United	W	D	W	D	W	D	L	D	L	D	W	L	N	D	D	W	L	W	W	W	W	W	W	W	N	W
Khon Kaen	W	D	D	D	L	W	W	L	W	N	D	W	W	D	L	L	W	W	W	W	D	N	D	D	L	W
Ubon Kruanapat	W	L	L	N	W	D	D	D	W	W	D	D	W	L	W	N	L	W	W	L	L	L	L	W	W	W
Muang Loei United	N	D	W	L	W	L	W	D	W	D	D	W	D	L	L	L	D	D	W	L	W	D	D	W	W	N
Surin City	W	L	W	D	D	N	D	D	L	D	W	D	L	D	W	L	D	N	D	W	L	W	W	L	W	D
Khon Kaen Mordindang	W	W	W	D	L	L	D	W	D	W	W	N	L	D	L	L	D	L	W	L	L	W	W	N	L	L
Udon United	L	L	D	D	D	W	L	N	L	L	L	W	D	W	W	W	D	D	L	N	D	W	L	L	W	D
Yasothon	L	N	L	D	D	D	D	W	L	D	L	L	D	N	D	W	W	L	D	W	D	D	L	L	L	L
Nakhon Ratchasima United	L	W	L	D	L	D	L	L	W	D	N	D	L	L	W	L	D	L	L	L	W	L	N	L	W	L
Surin Khong Chee Mool	L	W	D	W	D	L	D	L	N	L	L	L	W	W	L	D	L	L	L	L	N	L	L	L	L	L
Sakon Nakhon	L	L	L	D	D	L	N	L	L	L	L	L	D	L	L	D	D	L	N	L	L	L	L	D	L	L

Source: Thai League
N = No match; W = Won; D = Drawn; L = Lost

=== Results ===
Home \ Away	KKN	KKM	MSK	MLU	NRU	RSL	SNK	SKU	SRC	KCM	UBK	UDU	YST
Khon Kaen	—	0–2	1–1	0–0	1–0	2–2	1–1	0–2	4–0	2–1	1–0	1–0	1–1
Khon Kaen Mordindang	0–1	—	1–1	1–6	5–1	2–5	2–1	1–3	2–1	0–0	2–3	0–1	1–0
Mahasarakham SBT	1–0	3–1	—	1–1	4–0	1–1	4–0	1–1	0–0	1–0	0–0	3–2	3–1
Muang Loei United	3–3	2–2	0–2	—	1–0	1–2	3–1	1–2	2–1	2–1	1–2	1–2	2–2
Nakhon Ratchasima United	0–3	2–1	0–1	0–1	—	0–6	2–0	0–0	0–0	3–0	0–0	0–1	1–1
Rasisalai United	0–0	2–0	1–2	1–1	0–0	—	6–1	2–1	1–1	4–2	2–0	4–3	2–2
Sakon Nakhon	0–3	1–2	2–3	1–1	3–4	0–5	—	2–3	2–4	1–3	0–1	1–1	0–1
Sisaket United	0–0	1–2	1–0	1–0	1–0	1–0	3–0	—	0–0	2–1	4–0	2–0	3–0
Surin City	3–2	1–1	1–3	1–2	2–0	0–1	0–0	1–0	—	2–1	3–2	1–0	1–1
Surin Khong Chee Mool	1–5	1–3	1–2	1–5	3–2	0–4	1–1	0–2	0–1	—	2–0	0–0	1–1
Ubon Kruanapat	3–0	4–2	2–1	1–2	2–1	1–0	6–0	0–0	1–1	0–3	—	0–1	3–1
Udon United	0–3	1–1	0–1	0–0	2–3	2–0	0–0	0–0	1–1	2–0	2–3	—	0–0
Yasothon	0–2	0–2	0–1	0–0	2–0	1–3	1–0	0–1	0–0	3–2	1–1	1–3	—

Source: Thai League
Legend: Blue = home team win; Yellow = draw; Red = away team win.
For upcoming matches, an "a" indicates there is an article about the rivalry between the two participants.

== Season statistics ==
=== Top scorers ===
As of 18 March 2023.

Rank	Player	Club	Goals
1	(Thailand) Supab Muengchan	Rasisalai United	18
2	(Ghana) Oscar Plape	Ubon Kruanapat	17
3	(Brazil) Judivan	Khon Kaen	12
4	(Thailand) Tanapol Srithong	Khon Kaen Mordindang	10
5	(Thailand) Nattapon Thaptanon	Mahasarakham SBT	9
5	(Thailand) Wanit Chaisan	Mahasarakham SBT	9
5	(Mali) Ibrahim Konaré	Muang Loei United	9
5	(Brazil) Cristian Alex	Sisaket United	9

=== Hat-tricks ===
Player	For	Against	Result	Date
(Ghana) Oscar Plape	Ubon Kruanapat	Sakon Nakhon	6–0 (H)	11 September 2022
(Brazil) Judivan	Khon Kaen	Surin Khong Chee Mool	5–1 (A)	5 February 2023
(Mali) Ibrahim Konaré	Muang Loei United	Surin Khong Chee Mool	5–1 (A)	8 March 2023
(Ghana) Oscar Plape	Ubon Kruanapat	Khon Kaen Mordindang	4–2 (H)	11 March 2023
(Thailand) Supab Muengchan^{4}	Rasisalai United	Surin Khong Chee Mool	4–0 (A)	18 March 2023

Notes: ^{4} = Player scored 4 goals; (H) = Home team; (A) = Away team

=== Clean sheets ===
As of 18 March 2023.

Rank	Player	Club	Clean sheets
1	(Thailand) Itthipon Kamsuprom	Sisaket United	13
2	(Thailand) Ittikorn Kansrang	Mahasarakham SBT	10
3	(Thailand) Bunditvicha Nongngok	Khon Kaen	9
4	(Thailand) Jirawat Panla	Ubon Kruanapat	7
5	(Thailand) Putawan Prangthong	Nakhon Ratchasima United	5
5	(Thailand) Anuphong Kanyalang	Rasisalai United	5
5	(Thailand) Thanakorn Korkaew	Surin City	5
5	(Thailand) Panuwat Sritongdee	Udon United	5
5	(Thailand) Sakkongpop Sukprasert	Yasothon	5

== Attendances ==
=== Overall statistical table ===
Pos	Team	Total	High	Low	Average	Change
1	Mahasarakham SBT	18,094	11,444	389	1,508	n/a
2	Rasisalai United	9,458	4,610	235	789	n/a
3	Sisaket United	6,638	1,124	279	554	n/a
4	Khon Kaen	5,015	725	223	418	n/a
5	Khon Kaen Mordindang	4,985	2,830	53	416	n/a
6	Ubon Kruanapat	3,924	582	220	327	n/a
7	Yasothon	2,117	400	100	236	n/a
8	Surin City	2,400	545	115	219	n/a
9	Surin Khong Chee Mool	2,191	1,410	19	200	n/a
10	Udon United	1,645	329	100	183	n/a
11	Nakhon Ratchasima United	1,852	280	50	155	n/a
12	Muang Loei United	1,338	228	39	122	n/a
13	Sakon Nakhon	801	200	42	89	n/a
	League total	60,458	11,444	19	420	n/a

Source: Thai League
