= 2023–24 Thai League 3 Northeastern Region =

Thai League 3 Northeastern Region
- Season: 2023–24
- Dates: 16 September 2023 – 24 February 2024
- Champions: Sisaket United
- Relegated: Nakhon Ratchasima United
- T3 National Championship: Sisaket United; Mahasarakham SBT
- Matches: 156
- Goals: 485 (3.11 per match)
- Top goalscorer: (Brazil) Danilo (17 goals; Sisaket United)
- Best goalkeeper: (Thailand) Adisak Lambelsah (18 clean sheets; Sisaket United)
- Biggest home win: 6 goals difference Udon United 7–1 Surin Khong Chee Mool (15 October 2023); Sisaket United 6–0 Surin Khong Chee Mool (29 October 2023); Suranaree Black Cat 6–0 Surin Khong Chee Mool (14 January 2024); Muang Loei United 6–0 Surin Khong Chee Mool (3 February 2024)
- Biggest away win: 7 goals difference Nakhon Ratchasima United 0–7 Ubon Kruanapat (9 December 2023); Surin Khong Chee Mool 1–8 Mahasarakham SBT (10 December 2023)
- Highest scoring: 9 goals Surin Khong Chee Mool 1–8 Mahasarakham SBT (10 December 2023)
- Longest winning run: 8 matches Mahasarakham SBT
- Longest unbeaten run: 24 matches Sisaket United
- Longest winless run: 21 matches Nakhon Ratchasima United
- Longest losing run: 16 matches Nakhon Ratchasima United

The 2023–24 Thai League 3 Northeastern region is a region in the regional stage of the 2023–24 Thai League 3. The tournament was sponsored by Rising Sun fertilizer, and known as the Rising Sun Fertilizer League for sponsorship purposes. A total of 13 teams located in Northeastern of Thailand will compete in the league of the Northeastern region.

== Changes from last season ==
=== Promotion or relegation ===
Team	League		Notes
Team	Previous season	Current season	Notes
From Thai League 3
Sakon Nakhon (substituted off)	Thai League 3	Thailand Semi-pro League	
To Thai League 3
Suranaree Black Cat (substituted on)	Thailand Semi-pro League	Thai League 3	

== Teams ==
=== Number of teams by province ===
Position	Province	Number	Teams
1	Khon Kaen	2	Khon Kaen and Khon Kaen Mordindang
1	Nakhon Ratchasima	2	Nakhon Ratchasima United and Suranaree Black Cat
1	Sisaket	2	Rasisalai United and Sisaket United
1	Surin	2	Surin City and Surin Khong Chee Mool
5	Loei	1	Muang Loei United
5	Maha Sarakham	1	Mahasarakham SBT
5	Ubon Ratchathani	1	Ubon Kruanapat
5	Udon Thani	1	Udon United
5	Yasothon	1	Yasothon

=== Stadiums and locations ===
Locations of the 2023–24 Thai League 3 Northeastern region teams

Team	Location	Stadium	Coordinates
Khon Kaen	Khon Kaen (Mueang)	Khon Kaen PAO. Stadium	16°24′46″N 102°49′40″E
Khon Kaen Mordindang	Khon Kaen (Mueang)	Stadium of Khon Kaen University	16°28′36″N 102°49′04″E
Mahasarakham SBT	Mahasarakham (Mueang)	Mahasarakham Provincial Stadium	16°09′15″N 103°18′59″E
Muang Loei United	Loei (Mueang)	Stadium of Loei Rajabhat University	17°32′08″N 101°43′12″E
Nakhon Ratchasima United	Nakhon Ratchasima (Mueang)	Stadium of Fort Suranaree	14°57′58″N 102°05′58″E
Rasisalai United	Sisaket (Mueang)	Sisaket Provincial Stadium	15°05′21″N 104°19′25″E
Sisaket United	Sisaket (Mueang)	Sri Nakhon Lamduan Stadium	15°06′04″N 104°20′25″E
Suranaree Black Cat	Nakhon Ratchasima (Mueang)	Stadium of Suranaree University of Technology	14°53′17″N 102°01′01″E
Surin City	Surin (Mueang)	Sri Narong Stadium	14°52′30″N 103°29′50″E
Surin Khong Chee Mool	Surin (Mueang)	Stadium of Rajamangala University of Technology Isan, Surin Campus	14°51′15″N 103°28′53″E
Ubon Kruanapat	Ubon Ratchathani (Khueang Nai)	Stadium of Ubon Ratchathani Rajabhat University, Ban Yang Noi Campus	15°20′58″N 104°37′46″E
Udon United	Udon Thani (Mueang)	Stadium of Thailand National Sports University, Udon Thani Campus	17°24′20″N 102°46′09″E
Yasothon	Yasothon (Mueang)	Yasothon PAO. Stadium	15°46′58″N 104°09′06″E

=== Foreign players ===
A T3 team could register 3 foreign players from foreign players all around the world. A team can use 3 foreign players on the field in each game.

Note :
(substituted off) : players who released during second leg transfer window;
(substituted on) : players who registered during second leg transfer window.

AFC member countries players.
CAF member countries players.
CONCACAF member countries players.
CONMEBOL member countries players.
OFC member countries players.
UEFA member countries players.
No foreign player registered.

Club	Leg	Player 1	Player 2	Player 3
Khon Kaen	1st	(Brazil) Jose Magson Bezerra Dourado	(Brazil) Alberto Moreira Gouvea	(Brazil) Jonathan Monteiro
Khon Kaen	2nd	(Brazil) Jose Magson Bezerra Dourado	(Brazil) Alberto Moreira Gouvea	(Brazil) Jonathan Monteiro
Khon Kaen Mordindang	1st
Khon Kaen Mordindang	2nd
Mahasarakham SBT	1st	(Brazil) Ramon Mesquita (substituted off)	(Brazil) Erivelto (substituted off)	(Brazil) Leandro Assumpção
Mahasarakham SBT	2nd	(Brazil) Júlio Cesar Gomes Romaneli (substituted on)	(Brazil) Evson Patrício (substituted on)	(Brazil) Leandro Assumpção
Muang Loei United	1st	(Mali) Ibrahim Konaré (substituted off)	(Mali) Makan Diawara	(Mali) Yaya Sylla
Muang Loei United	2nd	(Nigeria) Omogba Esoh (substituted on)	(Mali) Makan Diawara	(Mali) Yaya Sylla
Nakhon Ratchasima United	1st	(Iran) Ataollah Poorjahani (substituted off)	(Iran) Ehsan Rajabi Jalil (substituted off)	(Iran) Sepehr Khosravi (substituted off)
Nakhon Ratchasima United	2nd		(Guinea) Conde Mamoudou (substituted on)	(Zambia) Noah Chivuta (substituted on)
Rasisalai United	1st	(South Korea) Jang Dong-hee (substituted off)
Rasisalai United	2nd
Sisaket United	1st	(Brazil) Carlos Damian dos Santos Puentes (substituted off)	(Brazil) Danilo	(Argentina) Panigazzi Matías Ignacio
Sisaket United	2nd	(Cameroon) Isaac Honore Aime Mbengan (substituted on)	(Brazil) Danilo	(Argentina) Panigazzi Matías Ignacio
Suranaree Black Cat	1st	(Brazil) Diego Amaral Gonçalves (substituted off)	(Nigeria) James Oise Jesuikhode
Suranaree Black Cat	2nd	(Ghana) Lewis David Dogbe (substituted on)	(Nigeria) James Oise Jesuikhode
Surin City	1st
Surin City	2nd
Surin Khong Chee Mool	1st
Surin Khong Chee Mool	2nd	(Cameroon) Edene Kent (substituted on)	(Bhutan) Dawa Tshering (substituted on)
Ubon Kruanapat	1st	(Ghana) Oscar Plape (substituted off)	(Egypt) Abdelrahman Osama Mohamed	(Burkina Faso) Mounzir Coulidiati
Ubon Kruanapat	2nd	(Brazil) Witalo Fernando Gomes de Andrade (substituted on)	(Egypt) Abdelrahman Osama Mohamed	(Burkina Faso) Mounzir Coulidiati
Udon United	1st	(Brazil) Abner Gomes Faria (substituted off)	(Brazil) João Paulo (substituted off)	(Brazil) Andrey Coutinho
Udon United	2nd	(Brazil) Haraan Hajazan Gonçalves Barbosa (substituted on)	(Brazil) Romário Reginaldo Alves (substituted on)	(Brazil) Andrey Coutinho
Yasothon	1st	(Republic of the Congo) Kabangu Nathan (substituted off)	(Republic of the Congo) Simba Masala (substituted off)
Yasothon	2nd	(Nigeria) Jordan Nyako Ayuba (substituted on)	(Sierra Leone) Serry Issa (substituted on)

== League table ==
=== Standings ===
Pos	Team	Pld	W	D	L	GF	GA	GD	Pts	Qualification or relegation
1	Sisaket United (C, Q)	24	16	8	0	42	7	+35	56	Qualification to the National Championship stage
2	Mahasarakham SBT (Q)	24	16	6	2	68	26	+42	54	Qualification to the National Championship stage
3	Surin City	24	14	2	8	38	26	+12	44 (Note: Surin City ahead on head-to-head points record; Surin City 6 pts, Udon United 0 pts.)	
4	Udon United	24	12	8	4	55	23	+32	44	
5	Khon Kaen	24	12	7	5	29	19	+10	43	
6	Ubon Kruanapat	24	11	7	6	42	21	+21	40	
7	Muang Loei United	24	11	6	7	43	33	+10	39	
8	Khon Kaen Mordindang	24	7	7	10	34	44	−10	28	
9	Rasisalai United	24	6	7	11	41	38	+3	25	
10	Suranaree Black Cat	24	7	3	14	33	41	−8	24	
11	Yasothon	24	6	2	16	21	50	−29	20	
12	Surin Khong Chee Mool	24	3	3	18	20	85	−65	12	
13	Nakhon Ratchasima United (R)	24	1	2	21	19	72	−53	5	Relegation to the Thailand Semi-pro League

Source: Thai League
Rules for classification: 1) Points; 2) Head-to-head points; 3) Head-to-head goal difference; 4) Head-to-head goal scored; 5) Overall goal difference; 6) Overall goal scored; 7) Fair play points; 8) Play-off without extra time).
(C) Champions; (Q) Qualified for the phase indicated; (R) Relegated

=== Positions by round ===
Team ╲ Round	1	2	3	4	5	6	7	8	9	10	11	12	13	14	15	16	17	18	19	20	21	22	23	24	25	26
Sisaket United	9	8	4	3	3	3	2	3	1	1	1	1	1	1	1	1	1	1	1	1	1	1	1	2	2	1
Mahasarakham SBT	8	4	2	4	4	4	4	4	4	2	4	3	2	2	2	2	2	2	2	2	2	2	2	1	1	2
Surin City	2	1	1	1	1	1	3	1	2	3	2	4	5	4	3	4	3	3	4	3	3	3	3	3	3	3
Udon United	1	2	3	2	2	2	1	2	3	4	5	7	6	5	4	5	4	4	3	4	4	4	6	5	4	4
Khon Kaen	4	6	9	8	7	7	9	8	7	7	7	5	7	7	7	7	5	6	6	6	6	6	4	4	5	5
Ubon Kruanapat	7	5	6	7	6	6	5	6	8	8	8	6	4	3	5	3	6	5	5	5	5	7	5	7	6	6
Muang Loei United	6	7	10	9	8	8	7	7	6	6	3	2	3	6	6	6	7	7	7	7	7	5	7	6	7	7
Khon Kaen Mordindang	5	10	7	5	5	5	6	5	5	5	6	8	8	8	8	8	8	8	8	8	8	8	8	8	8	8
Rasisalai United	3	3	5	6	9	9	10	10	9	9	10	10	10	10	9	10	10	10	11	10	9	10	9	10	9	9
Suranaree Black Cat	10	9	11	11	11	10	8	9	10	11	9	9	9	9	10	9	9	9	9	9	10	9	10	9	10	10
Yasothon	12	12	8	10	10	11	11	11	11	10	11	11	11	11	11	11	11	11	10	11	11	11	11	11	11	11
Surin Khong Chee Mool	11	11	12	13	13	13	13	13	13	13	13	12	12	12	12	12	12	12	12	12	12	12	12	12	12	12
Nakhon Ratchasima United	13	13	13	12	12	12	12	12	12	12	12	13	13	13	13	13	13	13	13	13	13	13	13	13	13	13

Source: Thai League
= Qualification to the National Championship stage; = Relegation to the Thailand Semi-pro League

=== Results by round ===
Team ╲ Round	1	2	3	4	5	6	7	8	9	10	11	12	13	14	15	16	17	18	19	20	21	22	23	24	25	26
Sisaket United	D	D	W	W	W	D	W	D	W	D	W	N	W	W	W	W	W	D	W	W	W	D	W	N	D	W
Mahasarakham SBT	D	W	W	N	W	D	W	D	D	W	L	W	W	W	W	N	W	W	W	W	D	W	W	W	D	L
Surin City	W	W	W	W	L	W	N	W	L	L	W	L	D	W	W	L	W	W	N	W	L	L	W	D	W	L
Udon United	W	D	W	D	W	D	W	D	N	D	L	D	W	W	W	L	W	W	D	L	N	D	L	W	W	W
Khon Kaen	D	D	N	D	W	D	L	W	W	D	W	W	L	W	N	W	W	L	L	W	L	W	W	D	D	W
Ubon Kruanapat	D	W	L	L	W	D	W	N	D	D	W	W	W	W	L	W	L	D	W	N	D	L	W	L	W	D
Muang Loei United	D	D	L	D	W	D	W	D	W	W	W	W	N	L	L	W	L	L	W	L	W	W	L	W	N	D
Khon Kaen Mordindang	D	L	W	W	N	W	L	D	W	W	L	L	D	L	W	D	N	W	D	D	D	L	L	L	L	L
Rasisalai United	W	D	L	D	L	L	L	D	W	N	L	D	D	L	W	L	L	L	L	D	W	N	W	L	W	D
Suranaree Black Cat	N	D	L	D	L	W	W	L	L	L	W	L	D	L	L	W	L	W	L	L	L	W	L	W	L	N
Yasothon	L	L	W	L	L	N	L	W	L	W	L	L	L	L	L	L	W	N	W	L	D	D	L	L	L	W
Surin Khong Chee Mool	L	N	L	L	L	L	L	L	L	L	L	W	L	N	L	D	L	L	L	W	W	L	L	L	D	D
Nakhon Ratchasima United	L	L	L	D	L	L	L	L	L	L	N	L	L	L	L	L	L	L	L	L	L	D	N	W	L	L

Source: Thai League
N = No match; W = Won; D = Drawn; L = Lost

=== Results ===
Home \ Away	KKN	KKM	MSK	MLU	NRU	RSL	SKU	SBC	SRC	KCM	UBK	UDU	YST
Khon Kaen	—	1–1	1–2	1–0	2–1	2–1	0–0	3–0	0–0	3–0	1–0	1–1	2–0
Khon Kaen Mordindang	0–2	—	1–6	2–1	2–1	1–1	0–2	1–0	1–1	2–2	0–2	0–2	1–1
Mahasarakham SBT	2–1	5–1	—	2–0	4–0	4–3	0–0	6–2	5–2	1–1	1–1	4–3	4–0
Muang Loei United	2–2	1–2	1–1	—	3–2	1–0	1–1	3–2	1–2	6–0	1–1	1–1	5–2
Nakhon Ratchasima United	1–2	0–3	1–4	1–2	—	0–2	0–2	0–0	0–5	0–2	0–7	0–4	0–2
Rasisalai United	1–1	1–1	0–2	4–0	5–3	—	0–1	2–1	2–3	4–1	2–3	1–1	5–1
Sisaket United	2–0	4–2	3–0	2–1	3–0	0–0	—	1–0	2–1	6–0	0–0	0–0	3–1
Suranaree Black Cat	0–1	3–2	1–0	1–3	4–0	2–2	1–4	—	1–2	6–0	3–1	1–1	0–1
Surin City	0–1	3–0	2–3	0–1	4–3	1–0	0–1	1–0	—	1–0	0–1	1–0	4–0
Surin Khong Chee Mool	1–0	0–5	1–8	0–3	1–4	3–3	0–4	2–3	1–2	—	0–3	2–6	1–0
Ubon Kruanapat	1–1	3–1	0–0	1–1	3–1	2–0	0–0	1–0	0–1	5–1	—	2–3	3–0
Udon United	3–0	1–1	1–1	0–1	6–1	2–1	0–0	4–1	1–2	7–1	2–1	—	4–0
Yasothon	0–1	1–4	0–3	3–4	0–0	2–1	0–1	0–1	2–0	3–0	2–1	0–2	—

Source: Thai League
Legend: Blue = home team win; Yellow = draw; Red = away team win.
For upcoming matches, an "a" indicates there is an article about the rivalry between the two participants.

== Season statistics ==
=== Top scorers ===
As of 24 February 2024.

Rank	Player	Club	Goals
1	(Brazil) Danilo	Sisaket United	17
2	(Brazil) Leandro Assumpção	Mahasarakham SBT	16
3	(Brazil) João Paulo	Udon United (13 Goals)	13
4	(Thailand) Supab Muengchan	Rasisalai United	12
5	(Brazil) Romaneli	Mahasarakham SBT (10 Goals)	10
5	(Thailand) Nattapon Thaptanon	Mahasarakham SBT	10
5	(Thailand) Watthanapon Chinthong	Surin City	10

=== Hat-tricks ===
Player	For	Against	Result	Date
(Brazil) João Paulo	Udon United	Nakhon Ratchasima United	6–1 (H)	17 September 2023
(Thailand) Watthanapon Chinthong	Surin City	Nakhon Ratchasima United	0–5 (A)	23 September 2023
(Brazil) Erivelto	Mahasarakham SBT	Nakhon Ratchasima United	4–0 (H)	1 October 2023
(Brazil) João Paulo^{4}	Udon United	Surin Khong Chee Mool	7–1 (H)	15 October 2023
(Brazil) Leandro Assumpção	Mahasarakham SBT	Surin City	5–2 (H)	18 November 2023
(Zambia) Noah Chivuta	Nakhon Ratchasima United	Surin City	4–3 (A)	16 December 2023
(Thailand) Apidet Janngam^{5}	Muang Loei United	Surin Khong Chee Mool	6–0 (H)	3 February 2024
(Thailand) Supab Muengchan	Rasisalai United	Muang Loei United	4–0 (H)	7 February 2024
(Nigeria) James Oise Jesuikhode	Suranaree Black Cat	Ubon Kruanapat	3–1 (H)	10 February 2024
(Thailand) Nattapon Thaptanon	Mahasarakham SBT	Khon Kaen Mordindang	1–6 (A)	10 February 2024

Notes: ^{5} = Player scored 5 goals; ^{4} = Player scored 4 goals; (H) = Home team; (A) = Away team

=== Clean sheets ===
As of 24 February 2024.

Rank	Player	Club	Clean sheets
1	(Thailand) Adisak Lambelsah	Sisaket United	18
2	(Thailand) Klanarong Wisuttiyanpirom	Ubon Kruanapat	9
3	(Thailand) Bunditvicha Nongngok	Khon Kaen	8
4	(Thailand) Piyawat Intarapim	Mahasarakham SBT	6
5	(Thailand) Jeerasak Phananut	Surin City	5
5	(Thailand) Adisak Boonthawi	Udon United	5

== Attendances ==
=== Overall statistical table ===
Pos	Team	Total	High	Low	Average	Change
1	Sisaket United	8,515	1,720	400	710	+28.2%
2	Mahasarakham SBT	6,805	702	463	567	−62.4%
3	Khon Kaen	4,954	629	0	450	+7.7%
4	Ubon Kruanapat	4,866	612	238	406	+24.2%
5	Yasothon	2,951	525	0	295	+25.0%
6	Udon United	3,412	445	137	284	+55.2%
7	Muang Loei United	3,362	1,100	100	280	+129.5%
8	Khon Kaen Mordindang	3,029	458	0	275	−33.9%
9	Surin City	2,831	670	120	236	+7.8%
10	Rasisalai United	2,051	536	0	205	−74.0%
11	Suranaree Black Cat	1,188	168	54	99	n/a
12	Surin Khong Chee Mool	1,022	170	0	93	−53.5%
13	Nakhon Ratchasima United	946	150	28	79	−49.0%
	League total	45,932	1,720	0	308	−26.7%

Updated to games played on 24 February 2024
Source: Thai League

=== Attendances by home match played ===
Team \ Match played	1	2	3	4	5	6	7	8	9	10	11	12	Total
Khon Kaen	Unk.1	409	543	312	333	414	516	398	629	387	413	600	4,954
Khon Kaen Mordindang	458	430	Unk.3	200	224	200	216	204	224	174	276	423	3,029
Mahasarakham SBT	702	669	614	693	463	512	559	488	521	624	465	495	6,805
Muang Loei United	1,100	242	251	293	108	139	193	156	100	300	165	315	3,362
Nakhon Ratchasima United	76	98	28	123	150	29	100	43	50	105	103	41	946
Rasisalai United	Unk.2	230	240	172	175	244	536	210	93	Unk.6	69	82	2,051
Sisaket United	988	650	758	822	592	525	580	400	520	480	480	1,720	8,515
Suranaree Black Cat	106	118	168	110	104	112	80	101	120	54	55	60	1,188
Surin City	181	360	230	210	124	120	181	670	150	175	300	130	2,831
Surin Khong Chee Mool	170	54	125	150	98	120	27	86	32	120	Unk.7	40	1,022
Ubon Kruanapat	474	420	429	478	465	312	312	242	522	612	362	238	4,866
Udon United	424	370	305	389	266	221	265	150	445	231	137	209	3,412
Yasothon	525	400	Unk.4	Unk.5	300	300	270	300	300	200	156	200	2,951

Note:
Unk.1 Some error of T3 official match report 17 September 2023 (Khon Kaen 1–1 Khon Kaen Mordindang).
Unk.2 Some error of T3 official match report 16 September 2023 (Rasisalai United 4–1 Surin Khong Chee Mool).
Unk.3 Some error of T3 official match report 26 October 2023 (Khon Kaen Mordindang 0–2 Udon United).
Unk.4 Some error of T3 official match report 29 October 2023 (Yasothon 0–1 Suranaree Black Cat).
Unk.5 Some error of T3 official match report 4 November 2023 (Yasothon 3–0 Surin Khong Chee Mool).
Unk.6 Some error of T3 official match report 21 January 2024 (Rasisalai United 2–3 Ubon Kruanapat).
Unk.7 Some error of T3 official match report 11 February 2024 (Surin Khong Chee Mool 1–4 Nakhon Ratchasima United).
