= Khon Kaen Mordindang F.C. =

Khon Kaen Mordindang ขอนแก่น มอดินแดง
- Full name: Khon Kaen Mordindang Football Club
- Nicknames: The Thunder Squirrels (กระรอกสายฟ้า)
- Founded: 2018; 8 years ago
- Ground: Stadium of Khon Kaen University; Khon Kaen, Thailand
- Capacity: 1,000
- Coordinates: 16°28′36″N 102°49′04″E
- Chairman: Dolchai Srisamran
- Head coach: Prakob Krasom
- League: Thai League 3
- 2025–26: Thai League 3, 11th of 12 in the Northeastern region
- Website: web.facebook.com/KhonKaenMordindangFC

Khon Kaen Mordindang Football Club (Thai สโมสรฟุตบอลขอนแก่น มอดินแดง), is a Thai professional football club based in Mueang, Khon Kaen, Thailand. The club is currently playing in the Thai League 3 Northeastern region.

== History ==
In 2018, the club was established and competed in the 2018 Thailand Amateur League Northeastern region, using the stadium of Khon Kaen university as the ground. At the end of the season, they have promoted to the 2019 Thai League 4.

In 2019, the club become a professional football club. Khon Kaen Mordindang competed in the Thai League 4 for the 2019 season. The club has finished fourth place in the league of the Northeastern region.

In 2020, the Football Association of Thailand merged the Thai League 3 and Thai League 4. As a result of this incident, all teams in Thai League 4 were promoted to Thai League 3. Khon Kaen Mordindang competed in the Thai League 3 for the 2020–21 season. In late December 2020, the Coronavirus disease 2019 or also known as COVID-19 had spread again in Thailand, the FA Thailand must abruptly end the regional stage of the Thai League 3. The club has finished the ninth place of the Northeastern region. In the 2020 Thai League Cup, Khon Kaen Mordindang have competed for this tournament, they have won to Nakhon Ratchasima United in the first qualification round. However, the FA Thailand must cancel the Thai League Cup this year due to the spreading of COVID-19.

In 2021, the 2021–22 season is the second consecutive season in the Thai League 3 of Khon Kaen Mordindang. They started the season with a 0–3 home defeated to Muang Loei United and they ended the season with a 0–2 away defeated to the Muang Loei United. The club has finished tenth place in the league of the Northeastern region. In addition, in the 2021–22 Thai FA Cup Khon Kaen Mordindang defeated 1–5 to Songkhla in the second round, causing them to be eliminated. While in the 2021–22 Thai League Cup Khon Kaen Mordindang defeated 0–1 to Udon United in the first qualification round, causing them to be eliminated too.

In 2022, Khon Kaen Mordindang competed in the Thai League 3 for the 2022–23 season. It is their 4th season in the professional league. The club started the season with a 2–1 away win over Sisaket United and they ended the season with a 1–3 home defeat to Sisaket United. The club has finished 8th place in the league of the Northeastern region. In addition, in the 2022–23 Thai League Cup Khon Kaen Mordindang was defeated 1–5 by Udon Thani in the qualification play-off round, causing them to be eliminated.

== Stadium and locations ==
Coordinates	Location	Stadium	Year
16°28′36″N 102°49′04″E	Nai Mueang, Mueang, Khon Kaen	Stadium of Khon Kaen University	2018 – present

== Season by season record ==
Season	League									FA Cup	League Cup	T3 Cup	Top goalscorer	
Season	Division	P	W	D	L	F	A	Pts	Pos	FA Cup	League Cup	T3 Cup	Name	Goals
2018	TA Northeast	3	3	0	0	22	1	9	1st	Opted out	Ineligible			
2019	T4 Northeast	24	9	10	5	49	33	37	4th	Opted out	QR2		(Thailand) Tanapol Srithong	20
2020–21	T3 Northeast	15	3	3	9	18	28	12	9th	R1	QR2		(Thailand) Phanu Wansuploed	5
2021–22	T3 Northeast	24	7	4	13	24	45	25	10th	R2	QR1		(Thailand) Pakawat Wongsrikaew	5
2022–23	T3 Northeast	24	9	5	10	36	41	32	8th	Opted out	QRP		(Thailand) Tanapol Srithong	11
2023–24	T3 Northeast	24	7	7	10	34	44	28	8th	Opted out	QRP	QR2	(Thailand) Tanapol Srithong	12
2024–25	T3 Northeast	20	5	2	13	22	46	17	11th	Opted out	QR1	Opted out	(Thailand) Tanapol Srithong	7
2025–26	T3 Northeast	22	3	3	16	18	40	12	11th	Opted out	QR1	LP	(Thailand) Wasawat Unthaya	4
2026–27	T3 Northeast										QR1			

Champions	Runners-up	Promoted	Relegated

- P = Played
- W = Games won
- D = Games drawn
- L = Games lost
- F = Goals for
- A = Goals against
- Pts = Points
- Pos = Final position
- QR1 = First Qualifying Round
- QR2 = Second Qualifying Round
- QRP = Qualification play-off Round
- R1 = Round 1
- R2 = Round 2
- R3 = Round 3
- R4 = Round 4
- R5 = Round 5
- R6 = Round 6
- QF = Quarter-finals
- SF = Semi-finals
- RU = Runners-up
- W = Winners

== Players ==
=== Current squad ===
As of 23 September 2024

Note: Flags indicate national team as defined under FIFA eligibility rules; some limited exceptions apply. Players may hold more than one non-FIFA nationality.

No.	Pos.	Nation	Player
1	GK	THA	Tanadon Kampromma
4	DF	THA	Warapong Pooduangdart
5	MF	THA	Sirawit Chueahan
6	MF	THA	Chunakorn Artnukarn
10	FW	THA	Pakawat Wongsrikaew
11	MF	THA	Kittikon Saosamran
12	MF	THA	Phakkhanet Patee
15	DF	THA	Tantathep Singkhampong
16	MF	THA	Patiphan Khunnoi
17	FW	THA	Thanarat Suphanklang
18	GK	THA	Paphawin Deebong
19	DF	THA	Witchakorn Saenwoem
22	MF	THA	Thanayot Naphurat
24	DF	THA	Ananyos Thumparak
25	GK	THA	Aphisit Sonpanya
27	DF	THA	Kittin Lorjanad
29	FW	THA	Tanapol Srithong

No.	Pos.	Nation	Player
30	FW	THA	Nuttawut Nartthaisong
31	DF	THA	Chaiyarit Nilchai
33	DF	THA	Pattadon Bumrungrat
39	FW	THA	Jenwit Wichana
41	MF	THA	Thaksin Promkun
42	DF	THA	Wirun Traikhummadan
45	MF	THA	Sirasit Hochin
49	DF	THA	Veerpat Kamsakaew
54	FW	THA	Jetvit Uthoksiri
55	DF	THA	Pattadon Sitthisart
59	FW	THA	Sumetha Bunthuk
66	MF	THA	Narathip Phoomaenam
77	FW	THA	Natthaphon Phinitluek
89	MF	THA	Thanapuritat Suwannapan
91	FW	THA	Theeraphon Saenbun
92	DF	THA	Jakrapob Chansongplueai

== Club staff ==
Position	Staff
Club President	(Thailand) Dolchai Srisamran
Co-Club President	(Thailand) Prasit Totuyo
Club director & Team manager	(Thailand) Praphansak Chaweerat
Technical director	(South Korea) Lee Jang-soo
Head coach	(Thailand) Prakob Krasom
Assistant coach	(Thailand) Mangkorn Charoenchai (Thailand) Komkrit Munkongsila (Thailand) Chakkraphong Kutyang
Photographer	(Thailand) Natthaphong Khamthongthiang (Thailand) Itthiwat Chanchaichit
Reporter	(Thailand) Wuttichai Laowasirasuwan
