= Aphichot Wekarun =

Thai footballer (born 1997)

Personal information
- Full name: Aphichot Wekarun
- Date of birth: 12 February 1997 (age 29)
- Place of birth: Yasothon, Thailand
- Height: 1.70 m (5 ft 7 in)
- Positions: Attacking midfielder; winger

Team information
- Current team: Ubon Kruanapat
- Number: 14

Youth career
- 2013–2015: Suan Pa Ban Khao Cha-ang School

Senior career*
Years	Team	Apps	(Gls)
2016	Bangkok	20	(3)
2017–2019	Ubon United	23	(0)
2017	→ Songkhla United (loan)	10	(0)
2020–2022	Uthai Thani		
2021–2022	→ Ubon Kruanapat (loan)		
2023–	Ubon Kruanapat		
- * Club domestic league appearances and goals

Aphichot Wekarun (Thai: อภิโชติ เวกอรุณ), born February 12, 1997), or simply known as F (Thai: เอฟ), is a Thai professional footballer who plays as an attacking midfielder and winger.

He has played professional football for numerous clubs across Thailand, including Bangkok FC, Ubon United, Songkhla United, Uthai Thani, and Ubon Kruanapat.

Wekarun last played for Uthai Thani. He is currently without a club.
