= Thaweekun Thong-on =

Thai footballer (born 1998)

Personal information
- Full name: Thaweekun Thong-on
- Date of birth: 1 March 1998 (age 28)
- Place of birth: Ubon Ratchathani, Thailand
- Height: 1.75 m (5 ft 9 in)
- Position: Attacking midfielder

Team information
- Current team: Yasothon
- Number: 41

Youth career
- 2014–2016: Ubon Rachathani Sports School

Senior career*
Years	Team	Apps	(Gls)
2017–2019	Ubon United	32	(4)
2019	Samut Prakan City	1	(0)
2020–2021	Muangkan United	3	(0)
2021	Ubon Kruanapat	11	(2)
2022	Customs Ladkrabang United	2	(0)
2022–2023	Sisaket United	25	(5)
2023–2024	Ubon Kruanapat	13	(0)
2024–2025	Sisaket United	18	(0)
2025–	Yasothon	21	(7)

International career
2017	Thailand U21	1	(0)
- * Club domestic league appearances and goals as of 6 March 2026

Thaweekun Thong-on (Thai: ทวีคูณ ทองอ่อน; born March 1, 1998) is a Thai professional footballer who plays as an attacking midfielder for Thai League 3 side Yasothon.
