= Rasisalai United F.C. =

Thai football club, based in Rasisalai

Rasisalai United ราษีไศล ยูไนเต็ด
- Full name: Rasisalai United Football Club สโมสรฟุตบอลราษีไศล ยูไนเต็ด
- Nicknames: The Monkey King (ราชาวานร)
- Founded: 2019; 7 years ago
- Ground: Sisaket Provincial Stadium; Sisaket, Thailand
- Capacity: 2,500
- Chairman: Nuchanart Jaruwongsatian
- Head coach: Surapong Kongthep
- League: Thai League 1
- 2025–26: Thai League 2, 1st of 18 (Promoted)
- Website: rasisalai-united-fc.com

Rasisalai United Football Club (Thai สโมสรฟุตบอลราษีไศล ยูไนเต็ด), is a professional football club based in Rasisalai, Sisaket, Thailand. They were promoted to the Thai League 1 in 2026.

== History ==
In 2019, the club was established as Rasisalai United and competed in Thailand Amateur League Northeastern region but they couldn't be promoted to the higher division. In early 2022, Rasisalai United competed in the Thailand Amateur League Northeastern region, using the Sisaket Provincial Stadium as the club home ground. At the end of the season, the club confirm its promotionto the Thai League 3 as the Thailand Amateur League champion. They use the Sisaket Provincial Stadium as a ground to compete for the T3 in the 2022–23 season.

In late 2022, Rasisalai United competed in the Thai League 3. It was their first season in the professional league. The club started the season with a 4–2 home win over Surin Khong Chee Mool and they ended the season with a 4–0 away win over Surin Khong Chee Mool. The club has finished third in the Northeastern region. In addition, in the 2022–23 Thai League Cup Rasisalai United was defeated 0–2 by Udon United in the first qualification round. In the 2024–25 season, Rasisalai United went on to become Thai League 3 champions, thus gaining promotion to the Thai League 2. In the 2025–26 season, Rasisalai United secured promotion to the Thai League 1 for the first time in their history.

== Stadium ==
Coordinates	Location	Stadium	Year
15°05′21″N 104°19′25″E	Sisaket	Sisaket Provincial Stadium	2019–present

== Season by season record ==
Season	League									FA Cup	League Cup	T3 Cup	Top goalscorer	
Season	Division	P	W	D	L	F	A	Pts	Pos	FA Cup	League Cup	T3 Cup	Name	Goals
2019	TA Northeast	3	0	0	3	4	15	0	4th	Opted out	Ineligible			
2020	TA Northeast	Not held due to COVID-19 pandemic in Thailand								QR1	Ineligible			
2021	TA Northeast	Not held due to COVID-19 pandemic in Thailand								R2	Ineligible			
2022	TA Northeast	7	7	0	0	33	6	21	1st	Opted out	Ineligible		(Thailand) Supab Muengchan	15
2022–23	T3 Northeast	24	13	7	4	54	24	46	3rd	Opted out	QR1		(Thailand) Supab Muengchan	18
2023–24	T3 Northeast	24	6	7	11	41	38	25	9th	Opted out	QR2	Opted out	(Thailand) Supab Muengchan	12
2024–25	T3 Northeast	20	16	3	1	66	14	51	1st	Opted out	Opted out	Opted out	(Brazil) Alberto Gouvea	22
2025–26	T2	34	20	11	3	64	35	71	1st	Opted out	Opted out		(Brazil) Alberto Gouvea	17
2026–27	T1									R1				

Champions	Runners-up	Promoted	Relegated

- P = Played
- W = Games won
- D = Games drawn
- L = Games lost
- F = Goals for
- A = Goals against
- Pts = Points
- Pos = Final position
- QR1 = First Qualifying Round
- QR2 = Second Qualifying Round
- R1 = Round 1
- R2 = Round 2
- R3 = Round 3
- R4 = Round 4
- R5 = Round 5
- R6 = Round 6
- QF = Quarter-finals
- SF = Semi-finals
- RU = Runners-up
- W = Winners

== Players ==
=== Current squad ===
As of 20 September 2026

Note: Flags indicate national team as defined under FIFA eligibility rules; some limited exceptions apply. Players may hold more than one non-FIFA nationality.

No.	Pos.	Nation	Player
1	GK	THA	Kiattisak Pimyotha
2	DF	THA	Nattapon Malapun
4	DF	THA	Chotika Meuanta (on loan from Buriram United)
5	DF	BRA	Ramon Mesquita (captain)
6	MF	THA	Somkaet Kunmee
7	FW	JPN	Yuga Watanabe
8	MF	THA	Natchanon Yongsakool
9	FW	KOR	Kim Ji-Min
10	MF	BRA	Gilberto Macena
11	FW	STP	Ricardo Cardoso
12	GK	BRA	Gabriel Bernard
13	GK	THA	Supasan Somkidlert
16	MF	THA	Natthaphob Chaimongkhon
18	FW	THA	Thanachianchot Rojtearawanich
19	DF	THA	Apsit Nusonsala
20	FW	BRA	Caio Rosa
21	DF	THA	Apirak Thongjan

No.	Pos.	Nation	Player
23	MF	THA	Jirawat Chingchaiyaphum
26	DF	NGR	Nelson Orji
27	FW	THA	Supab Muengchan
28	MF	THA	Thanongsak Khrutthasarn
30	DF	THA	Thitiphong Photumtha
32	MF	THA	Somyot Pongsuwan
35	MF	ARG	Matias Panigazzi
39	FW	THA	Jakkit Palapon
44	FW	THA	Wichit Kongsinkaew
47	MF	THA	Tayawat Nomrawee
72	DF	THA	Yingyong Butngam
77	MF	THA	Nattapon Yongsakool
80	GK	BRA	Gabriel Davis
91	FW	SEN	Sekou Gassama
93	DF	THA	Piyawat Petra (on loan from Buriram United)
97	MF	THA	Paripan Wongsa (on loan from Buriram United)
99	GK	THA	Sakkongpop Sukprasert

== Managerial history ==
Head coaches by years (2019–present)

- (Thailand) Panuwat Sripao 2019–2022
- (Thailand) Preeda Chankra 2022–2023
- (Thailand) Chonlatit Jantakam 2023
- (Thailand) Preeda Chankra 2023–2024
- (Thailand) Arnon Bandasak 2024–2026
- (Thailand) Sirisak Yodyardthai 2026
- (Thailand) Surapong Kongthep 2026–

== Honours ==
=== Domestic competitions ===
==== League ====
- Thai League 2
  - Winners (1): 2025–26
- Thai League 3
  - Winners (1): 2024–25
- Thai League 3 Northeastern Region
  - Winners (1): 2024–25
- Thailand Amateur League
  - Winners (1): 2022
