= David Srangnanaok =

Thai footballer

Personal information
- Full name: David Srangnanaok
- Date of birth: 16 September 1987 (age 39)
- Place of birth: Khon Kaen, Thailand
- Height: 1.80 m (5 ft 11 in)
- Position: Striker

Team information
- Current team: Ayutthaya

Senior career*
Years	Team	Apps	(Gls)
2008–2014	Sisaket	33	(8)
2014	Roi Et United		
2014	Ubon Ratchathani		
2015–2016	Khon Kaen United		
2016	→ Kalasin (loan)		
2017–	Ayutthaya		
- * Club domestic league appearances and goals as of 13 April 2010 ‡ National team caps and goals as of 18 April 2010

David Srangnanaok (Thai: เดวิด สร้างนานอก) is a Thai professional footballer.
