= Korat City F.C. =

Korat City โคราช ซิตี้
- Full name: Korat City Football Club
- Nicknames: The wonder cats (แมวอัศจรรย์)
- Founded: 2018; 8 years ago, as Suranaree Army 2 Football Club; 2023; 3 years ago, as Suranaree Black Cat Football Club; 2025; 1 year ago, as Korat City Football Club
- Ground: Stadium of Suranaree University of Technology; Nakhon Ratchasima, Thailand
- Capacity: 3,000
- Coordinates: 14°53′16″N 102°01′01″E
- Owner(s): Blackcat Korat Co., Ltd.
- Chairman: Ong-art Pruekpanawet
- Head coach: Kraikiat Koonthanazap
- League: Thai League 3
- 2025–26: Thai League 3, 10th of 12 in the Northeastern region

Korat City Football Club (Thai สโมสรฟุตบอล โคราช ซิตี้) is a professional Thai football club based in Mueang, Nakhon Ratchasima. The club is currently playing in the Thai League 3 Northeastern region.

== History ==
The club was originally founded in 2018 under the name Suranaree Army 2 F.C. and competed in the Thailand Amateur League until the 2022 season.

In 2023, following the restructuring of the lower divisions with the establishment of the Thailand Semi-pro League as the fourth tier of the Thai football league system, the club entered the competition in the Northeastern region. Under the league's regulations, the winners of each regional division would earn promotion to the 2023–24 Thai League 3. Suranaree Army 2 F.C. finished first in the Northeastern region, thereby securing promotion to Thai League 3.

Upon promotion, the club rebranded as Suranaree Black Cat F.C. and competed in the Thai League 3 Northeastern region during the 2023–24 season. The team continued to play in this division through the 2024–25 season.

Ahead of the 2025–26 season, the club underwent another rebranding, changing its name and logo to Korat City F.C., while retaining its position in the Thai League 3 Northeastern region.

== Stadium and locations ==
Coordinates	Location	Stadium	Year
14°53′16″N 102°01′01″E	Mueang, Nakhon Ratchasima	Stadium of Suranaree University of Technology	2023 – present

== Season by season record ==
Season	League									FA Cup	League Cup	T3 Cup	Top goalscorer	
Season	Division	P	W	D	L	F	A	Pts	Pos	FA Cup	League Cup	T3 Cup	Name	Goals
2018	TA Northeast	2	1	1	0	4	3	4	2nd	Opted out	Ineligible			
2019	TA Northeast	6	4	1	1	18	4	13	2nd	Opted out	Ineligible			
2022	TA Northeast	3	2	1	0	12	0	7	1st	Opted out	Ineligible			
2023	TS Northeast	9	6	2	1	13	5	20	1st	Opted out	Ineligible		(Thailand) Chingwaphat Khrueawan	5
2023–24	T3 Northeast	24	7	3	14	33	41	24	10th	Opted out	QR2	QR2	(Nigeria) James Oise Jesuikhode	7
2024–25	T3 Northeast	20	5	4	11	17	32	19	8th	Opted out	Opted out	LP	(Thailand) Thammakai Jaidee	6
2025–26	T3 Northeast	22	4	4	14	24	51	16	10th	Opted out	Opted out	Opted out	(France) Mabiala Gaël Cedric	5

Champions	Runners-up	Promoted	Relegated

- P = Played
- W = Games won
- D = Games drawn
- L = Games lost
- F = Goals for
- A = Goals against
- Pts = Points
- Pos = Final position
- QR1 = First Qualifying Round
- QR2 = Second Qualifying Round
- R1 = Round 1
- R2 = Round 2
- R3 = Round 3
- R4 = Round 4
- R5 = Round 5
- R6 = Round 6
- QF = Quarter-finals
- SF = Semi-finals
- RU = Runners-up
- W = Winners

== Players ==
=== Current squad ===
As of 25 September 2024

Note: Flags indicate national team as defined under FIFA eligibility rules; some limited exceptions apply. Players may hold more than one non-FIFA nationality.

No.	Pos.	Nation	Player
3	DF	KOR	Lee Geon-woo
4	MF	THA	Bunyarit Srinam
5	MF	THA	PhanuphongSujjaviranon
6	DF	THA	Watcharapong Nuangprakaew
7	FW	THA	Kittisak Roekyamdee
10	FW	THA	Siwananon Manausa
11	MF	KOR	Ahn Eun-gwan
14	FW	THA	Sunthon Sanitnok
16	DF	THA	Supawat Srithong
17	FW	THA	anatee Simee
18	GK	THA	Thatthana Burinram
21	DF	THA	Siriwat Sakkhwa
22	MF	USA	Christian Joseph Sacchini

No.	Pos.	Nation	Player
28	DF	THA	Kongphop Wichian
29	DF	THA	Chinnawat Praingkrathok
30	DF	THA	Phutawan Apilap
31	GK	THA	Ashiravit Nutsuntia
32	MF	THA	Napan Chompho
44	MF	THA	Nattawat Songsroem
47	DF	THA	Thanapat Warong
49	GK	THA	Kanisorn Phaphinyo
54	FW	THA	Apiwit Tangtrakulsap
66	GK	THA	Chanasorn Kaewyos
77	MF	THA	Phuphat Pakare
79	MF	THA	Phankawi Sroisri
98	DF	THA	Naruebodin Aubonban

== Coaching staff ==
Position	Staff
Team manager	(Thailand) Natthasit Pongpetch
Head coach	(Thailand) Krit Singpreecha
Goalkeeping coach	(Thailand)
