= Yasothon F.C. =

Thai football club

Yasothon FC ยโสธร เอฟซี
- Full name: Yasothon United Football Club สโมสรฟุตบอลจังหวัดยโสธร
- Nicknames: The Rockets (สิงห์บั้งไฟโก้)
- Founded: 2010; 16 years ago
- Ground: Yasothon Province Stadium; Yasothon, Thailand
- Capacity: 5,000
- Chairman: Petchtai Wongkamlao
- Head coach: Prachumphong Kongchandee
- League: Thai League 3
- 2025–26: Thai League 3, 9th of 12 in the Northeastern region
Home colours	Away colours

Yasothon Football Club (Thai สโมสรฟุตบอลจังหวัดยโสธร), is a Thailand semi professional Association football club based in Yasothon Province. The club was formed in 2010 and entered the Thai League 3 Northeastern region.

== History ==
In 2022, Yasothon competed in the Thai League 3 for the 2022–23 season. It is their 11th season in the professional league. The club started the season with a 0–1 home defeat to Mahasarakham SBT and they ended the season with a 1–3 away defeat to Mahasarakham SBT. The club has finished 10th place in the league of the Northeastern region.

== Stadium and locations ==
Coordinates	Location	Stadium	Year
15°46′58″N 104°09′05″E	Yasothon	Yasothon Province Stadium	2010–present

== Season by season record ==
Season	League									FA Cup	League Cup	T3 Cup	Top goalscorer	
Season	Division	P	W	D	L	F	A	Pts	Pos	FA Cup	League Cup	T3 Cup	Name	Goals
2010	Northeast	30	17	4	9	64	44	55	3rd	Opted out	Opted out			
2011	Northeast	30	14	7	9	42	38	49	4th	R2	Opted out			
2012	Northeast	30	12	10	8	36	19	46	7th	Opted out	QR1			
2013	Northeast	30	7	7	16	26	45	28	14th	Opted out	QR2			
2016	Northeast	26	6	8	12	19	36	26	11th	QR	R1			
2017	T4 Northeast	33	9	10	14	46	43	37	9th	Opted out	Opted out		(Cameroon) Ousmanou Mohamadou	11
2018	T4 Northeast	26	10	10	6	30	23	40	3rd	Opted out	Opted out		(Guinea) Diop Badara Aly	7
2019	T4 Northeast	24	4	9	11	28	43	21	11th	Opted out	Opted out		(Guinea) Diop Badara Aly	5
2020–21	T3 Northeast	15	8	3	4	21	13	27	3rd	Opted out	Opted out		(Thailand) Phakhawat Poonachang	7
2021–22	T3 Northeast	24	5	12	7	23	30	27	9th	Opted out	Opted out		(Thailand) Pongsak Boontos	7
2022–23	T3 Northeast	24	4	10	10	20	33	22	10th	Opted out	Opted out		(Thailand) Amronphun Homduang	3
2023–24	T3 Northeast	24	6	2	16	21	50	20	11th	Opted out	Opted out	QR2	(Thailand) Sutthipong Duangthungsa	6
2024–25	T3 Northeast	20	5	5	10	21	39	20	7th	Opted out	Opted out	Opted out	(Nigeria) James Oise Jesuikhode, (Nigeria) Julius Chukwuma Ononiwu	4
2025–26	T3 Northeast	22	6	6	10	28	33	24	9th	Opted out	Opted out	Opted out	(Thailand) Thaweekun Thong-on	7

Champions	Runners-up	Third place	Promoted	Relegated

- P = Played
- W = Games won
- D = Games drawn
- L = Games lost
- F = Goals for
- A = Goals against
- Pts = Points
- Pos = Final position
- QR1 = First Qualifying Round
- QR2 = Second Qualifying Round
- R1 = Round 1
- R2 = Round 2
- R3 = Round 3
- R4 = Round 4
- R5 = Round 5
- R6 = Round 6
- QF = Quarter-finals
- SF = Semi-finals
- RU = Runners-up
- W = Winners

== Players ==
=== Current squad ===
As of 25 September 2024

Note: Flags indicate national team as defined under FIFA eligibility rules; some limited exceptions apply. Players may hold more than one non-FIFA nationality.

No.	Pos.	Nation	Player
2	DF	THA	Anusit Meekhun
4	DF	THA	Thanat Boulom
5	DF	THA	Adisak Narattho
6	MF	THA	Narongsak Boonyo
8	MF	THA	Silawit Pootawon
9	FW	THA	Aekkachai Singwong
10	MF	THA	Surachai Chowna
11	FW	SLE	Serry Issa
12	MF	THA	Ratthaphum Sophasing
13	GK	THA	Jetsada Bunrueng
14	MF	THA	Amronphun Homduang
15	MF	THA	Nantaphop Anuphun
16	MF	THA	Chirasak Kaeoka
17	DF	THA	Theerawat Thonsri
18	FW	NGA	James Oise Jesuikhode
19	DF	THA	Narathip Karnaphat

No.	Pos.	Nation	Player
21	MF	THA	Nathaphop Chiorapphon
23	FW	NGA	Julius Chukwuma Ononiwu
24	DF	THA	Tanawat Lertrit
25	DF	THA	Bancha Phromkhot
29	DF	THA	Narachai Thongthap
31	FW	THA	Thanakon Taothong
32	MF	THA	Pricha Sripao
37	DF	THA	Anon Moonsan
39	FW	THA	Wongsanun Phiamnong
41	DF	THA	Sitichok Teecorngon
46	GK	THA	Surakiad Kratumkhan
55	DF	THA	Wachirasakun Phumsathan
64	DF	THA	Narongrit Buawaew
77	FW	THA	Kittithat Rakfa
88	GK	THA	Suriya Tophum
99	MF	THA	Natthapit Pleankhum

== Coaching staff ==
Position	Staff
Chairman	(Thailand) Petchtai Wongkamlao
Technical Director	(Thailand) Anurak Srikerd
Team Manager	(Thailand) Kwanphat Chueawanich
Head Coach	(Thailand) Chawang Kongnonkok
