= Udon United F.C. =

Thai football club, based in Mueang

Udon United อุดร ยูไนเต็ด
- Full name: Udon United Football Club สโมสรฟุตบอลอุดร ยูไนเต็ด
- Nicknames: The Northeastern Foxes (จิ้งจอกอีสาน)
- Founded: 2018; 8 years ago, as Nong Han; 2019; 7 years ago, as UD Nong Han; 2020; 6 years ago, as Udon United
- Ground: Main Stadium of Thailand National Sports University, Udon Thani Campus; Udon Thani, Thailand
- Capacity: 1,000
- Coordinates: 17°24′20″N 102°46′09″E
- Chairman: Chittapol Wilai-ngam
- Head coach: Wittaya Dongyai
- League: Thai League 3
- 2025–26: Thai League 3, 2nd of 12 in the Northeastern region
- Website: https://web.facebook.com/สโมสรฟุตบอล-อุดรยูไนเต็ด-102314721230418

Udon United Football Club (Thai สโมสรฟุตบอล อุดร ยูไนเต็ด), is a Thai professional football club based in Mueang, Udon Thani, Thailand. The club is currently playing in the Thai League 3 Northeastern region.

== History ==
In 2018, the club was established as Nong Han and competed in Thailand Amateur League Northeastern region, used Nongbua Lamphu Provincial Stadium as ground. In the 2018 season, the club used the players from the Pitchaya Bundit college to compete in the amateur league. They competed in the amateur league to the 2018 and 2019 seasons continuously.

In 2020, the club was promoted to Thai League 3 or also known as Omsin League. Due to the resurgence of COVID-19 pandemic in Thailand, the FA Thailand must abruptly end the regional stage of the Thai League 3. The club finished the 1st place of the Northeastern region and could advanced to 2020–21 Thai League 3 National Championship. Udon United finished 2nd place in the upper group advanced to the promotion play-off but they were defeated to Rajpracha. However, Jardel Capistrano, a player with Udon United was the topscorer of the Thai League 3 in 2020–21 season.

In 2022, Udon United competed in the Thai League 3 for the 2022–23 season. It is their 3rd season in the professional league. The club started the season with a 0–1 away defeat to Surin City and they ended the season with a 1–1 home draw with Surin City. The club has finished 9th place in the league of the Northeastern region. In addition, in the 2022–23 Thai FA Cup Udon United was defeated 1–4 by Nongbua Pitchaya in the second round, causing them to be eliminated and in the 2022–23 Thai League Cup Udon United was defeated 2–3 by MH Nakhon Si City in the qualification play-off round, causing them to be eliminated too.

== Stadium and locations ==
Coordinates	Location	Stadium	Capacity	Year
17°07′48″N 102°25′26″E	Nong Bua, Mueang, Nongbua Lamphu	Nongbua Lamphu Provincial Stadium	4,000	2018–2019
17°24′20″N 102°46′09″E	Ban Lueam, Mueang, Udon Thani	Main Stadium of Thailand National Sports University, Udon Thani Campus	7,000	2020–

== Season by season record ==
Season	League									FA Cup	League Cup	T3 Cup	Top goalscorer	
Season	Division	P	W	D	L	F	A	Pts	Pos	FA Cup	League Cup	T3 Cup	Name	Goals
2018	TA Northeast	5	4	1	0	11	4	13	1st	Opted out	Ineligible		—N/a	—N/a
2019	TA Northeast	3	2	1	0	13	1	7	1st	Opted out	Ineligible		—N/a	—N/a
2020–21	T3 Northeast	16	15	1	0	63	17	46	1st	R3	Opted out		(Brazil) Jardel Capistrano	27
2021–22	T3 Northeast	24	6	7	11	27	33	25	11th	R1	QR2		(Brazil) Célio Guilherme da Silva Santos	7
2022–23	T3 Northeast	24	7	8	9	24	26	29	9th	R2	QRP		(Brazil) Ranieri Luiz Barbosa	12
2023–24	T3 Northeast	24	12	8	4	55	23	44	4th	SF	R1	R1	(Brazil) João Paulo	15
2024–25	T3 Northeast	20	9	9	2	28	13	36	3rd	R1	QRP	R16	(Thailand) Danusorn Wijitpunya	6
2025–26	T3 Northeast	22	13	6	3	48	23	45	2nd	R1	QRP	R16	(Finland) Sakari Tukiainen	12
2026–27	T3 Northeast										QR1			

Champions	Runners-up	Promoted	Relegated

- P = Played
- W = Games won
- D = Games drawn
- L = Games lost
- F = Goals for
- A = Goals against
- Pts = Points
- Pos = Final position
- QR1 = First Qualifying Round
- QR2 = Second Qualifying Round
- R1 = Round 1
- R2 = Round 2
- R3 = Round 3
- R4 = Round 4
- R5 = Round 5
- R6 = Round 6
- QF = Quarter-finals
- SF = Semi-finals
- RU = Runners-up
- W = Winners

== Players ==
=== Current squad ===
As of 25 December 2025

Note: Flags indicate national team as defined under FIFA eligibility rules; some limited exceptions apply. Players may hold more than one non-FIFA nationality.

No.	Pos.	Nation	Player
1	GK	THA	Ratthaphum Singboonmee
4	DF	THA	Anisong Jaroentham
5	MF	THA	Nutthawut Khamrin
6	MF	THA	Thadsakorn Songkongduangdee
7	MF	THA	Surasak Somrat
8	MF	THA	Kittipat Wongsombat
9	FW	BRA	Elias
10	FW	THA	Tawin Butsombat
13	DF	THA	Apisit Tanaman
14	FW	THA	Danusorn Wijitpunya
15	DF	THA	Seeket Madputeh
16	MF	THA	Thitiwat Janda
17	DF	THA	Thianchai Chantra
18	MF	THA	Sakda Noppakdee
19	GK	THA	Adisak Boonthawi
20	FW	THA	Narongkorn Buasri

No.	Pos.	Nation	Player
21	DF	THA	Prayad Pholput
22	DF	THA	Akkharasorn Phatthanawong
23	MF	THA	Thawatchai Aocharod
28	MF	THA	Nattawat Judasing
29	FW	THA	Chatri Rattanawong
30	FW	GHA	Kwame Karikari
35	DF	THA	Thanathip Paengwong
38	MF	THA	Sudthirak ChuisiriI
44	DF	THA	Natthapon Wisetchat
66	MF	THA	Niwat Nonkao
91	DF	THA	Nirun Chaokhao
95	DF	BRA	Victor Clemente de Oliveira Capinan
96	DF	THA	Sittipat Kreearee
98	GK	THA	Saphon Mueangchomphu
99	DF	THA	Anuchit Sompakdee
