= Nakhon Ratchasima United F.C. =

Thai football club

Nakhon Ratchasima United นครราชสีมา ยูไนเต็ด
- Full name: Nakhon Ratchasima United Football Club สโมสรฟุตบอล นครราชสีมา ยูไนเต็ด
- Nicknames: The Locomotives (หัวรถจักรพิฆาต)
- Founded: 2005; 21 years ago, as Sriracha-Sannibat Samut Prakan F.C. 2017; 9 years ago, as Huai Thalaeng United F.C. 2020; 6 years ago, as Nakhon Ratchasima United F.C.
- Ground: Surapala Keetha Sathan Stadium; Nakhon Ratchasima, Thailand
- Capacity: 3,500
- Chairman: Atthapong Ketmethikarun
- Manager: Bundit Jumpha
- League: Thailand Semi-pro League
- 2023–24: Thai League 3, 13th of 13 in the Northeastern region (relegated)
Home colours

Nakhon Ratchasima United Football Club (Thai สโมสรฟุตบอลนครราชสีมา ยูไนเต็ด), is a Thai football club based in Nakhon Ratchasima Province, Thailand. The club is currently playing in the Thai League 3 Northeastern region.

== History ==
The club founded in 2005 as Sriracha-Sannibat Samut Prakan F.C.

In 2016, This club was token over Pattaya F.C. from Khor Cup and is changed the name to Pattaya City and change the club's official logo is the whale, hence their nickname is Killer whale.

In 2017, The club is token over Huai Thalaeng F.C. from Khor Cup and is changed the name to Huai Thalaeng United F.C. and change the club's official logo is the Locomotive, hence their nickname is Killer Locomotive.

In 2020, The club was renamed to Nakhon Ratchasima United F.C. and changed the text on the club's logo to Nakhon Ratchasima United too.

In 2022, Nakhon Ratchasima United competed in the Thai League 3 for the 2022–23 season. It is their 16th season in the professional league. The club started the season with a 0–3 home defeat to Khon Kaen and they ended the season with a 0–1 away defeat to Khon Kaen. The club has finished 11th place in the league of the Northeastern region. In addition, in the 2022–23 Thai FA Cup Nakhon Ratchasima United was defeated 0–2 by Saimit Kabin United in the second round, causing them to be eliminated and in the 2022–23 Thai League Cup Nakhon Ratchasima United was defeated 0–6 by Sisaket United in the second qualification round, causing them to be eliminated too.

=== Crest history ===
The club has changed the texts on the logo to Nakhon Ratchasima United in 2020.

2020–present

== Yo-Yo club ==
The club has somewhat become known as a yo-yo club in the Thai football scene, being relegated and promoted to and from the top flight on five successive occasions between 2008 and 2012. The sequence was broken in 2012 when they finished one place off the promotion spots in 2012 Division 1 race.

== Stadium and locations by season records ==
Coordinates	Location	Stadium	Year
12°55′28″N 100°56′14″E	Chonburi	Nong Prue Stadium	2016
14°55′38″N 102°02′56″E	Nakhon Ratchasima	80th Birthday Stadium	2017
14°53′16″N 102°01′00″E	Nakhon Ratchasima	Suranaree University of Technology Stadium	2017–

== Record ==
Season	League									FA Cup	League Cup	T3 Cup	Top goalscorer	
Season	Division	P	W	D	L	F	A	Pts	Pos	FA Cup	League Cup	T3 Cup	Name	Goals
Sriracha
2007	DIV1	22	7	8	7	20	20	29	6th	Opted out				
2008	DIV1	30	16	9	5	40	22	57	2nd	Opted out			(Argentina) Raúl González Gastón	9
2009	TPL	30	8	8	16	28	34	30	14th	R4			(Argentina) Raúl González Gastón	7
2010	DIV1	30	19	5	6	62	33	62	1st	R4	Opted out		(Argentina) Raúl González Gastón	14
2011	TPL	34	7	11	16	32	43	32	17th	QF	Opted out		(Brazil) Aron da Silva	10
2012	DIV1	34	21	4	9	70	41	67	4th	R2	Opted out		(Thailand) Anuwat Nakkaseam	18
2013	DIV1	34	10	7	17	48	53	37	15th	R2	Opted out		(Cameroon) Berlin Ndebe-Nlome	15
2014	DIV1	34	0	3	31	19	90	3	18th	R2	Opted out		(Thailand) Boonkerd Chaiyasin	6
2015	DIV2 Central & East	26	4	8	14	28	44	20	12th	Opted out	QR1			
2016	DIV2 East	22	7	5	10	35	36	26	8th	Opted out	QR1		(Japan) Soma Otani	10
Huai Thalaeng United
2017	T4 Northeast	33	10	7	16	44	64	37	8th	Opted out	Opted out		(Thailand) Warut Trongkratok	13
2018	T4 Northeast	26	8	5	13	36	42	29	12th	QR	QR1		(Ivory Coast) Coulibaly Bangaly	14
2019	T4 Northeast	24	12	6	6	41	33	42	2nd	R2	1st QF		(Senegal) Aliou Seck	14
Nakhon Ratchasima United
2020–21	T3 Northeast	16	4	4	8	25	38	16	6th	QR	QR1		(Brazil) Vinicius Silva Freitas	11
2021–22	T3 Northeast	24	15	6	3	43	21	51	3rd	QR	R1		(Thailand) Tatree Seeha	10
2022–23	T3 Northeast	24	5	5	14	19	40	20	11th	R2	QR2		(Thailand) Aekkachai Singwong	5
2023–24	T3 Northeast	24	1	2	21	19	72	5	13th	Opted out	Opted out	QR2	(Zambia) Noah Chivuta	4

Champions	Runners-up	Promoted	Relegated

- P = Played
- W = Games won
- D = Games drawn
- L = Games lost
- F = Goals for
- A = Goals against
- Pts = Points
- Pos = Final position
- TPL = Thai Premier League
- QR1 = First Qualifying Round
- QR2 = Second Qualifying Round
- QR3 = Third Qualifying Round
- QR4 = Fourth Qualifying Round
- RInt = Intermediate Round
- R1 = Round 1
- R2 = Round 2
- R3 = Round 3
- R4 = Round 4
- R5 = Round 5
- R6 = Round 6
- GR = Group stage
- QF = Quarter-finals
- SF = Semi-finals
- RU = Runners-up
- S = Shared
- W = Winners

== Players ==
=== Current squad ===
As of 2 February 2023

Note: Flags indicate national team as defined under FIFA eligibility rules; some limited exceptions apply. Players may hold more than one non-FIFA nationality.

No.	Pos.	Nation	Player
1	GK	THA	Jaturong Paekuntod
2	DF	THA	Nathan Phatpho
3	DF	THA	Chanchana Marmod
4	MF	THA	John Panoiwong
7	MF	THA	Aphidet Aetyat
8	MF	THA	Chonlasit Suwannakoth
9	FW	THA	Sirisak Kaykaeo
10	FW	THA	Nitirat Wiangdindam
15	DF	THA	Krittidech Songbundit
16	GK	THA	Patthanasak Boriboon
17	DF	THA	Phitakpong Chaiyapho
20	MF	THA	Chatchai Wapeekung

No.	Pos.	Nation	Player
24	DF	GUI	Abdoul Karim Sylla
24	MF	THA	Pakpoom Prakobphon
26	FW	THA	Tatree Seeha (captain)
27	DF	THA	Pranuphong Khaongam
30	GK	THA	Pattarapon Pakdeengam
31	MF	THA	Thanakorn Boonyapichit
34	DF	THA	Teerathep Tuphimai
36	DF	THA	Aekkapop Songsukae
38	GK	THA	Sara Phunsawat
49	FW	GUI	Diop Badara Aly
66	FW	THA	Sakdinon Jumpha
77	MF	THA	Kittisak Techakhobut
79	MF	THA	Isara Aupara
22	FW	PAK	Mohib Ullah

== Coaching staff ==
Position	Name
Manager	(Thailand) Bundit Jumpha
Assistant Manager	(Thailand) Pailin Praca
First Team Coach	Vacant
Goalkeeper Coach	(Thailand) Prasong Khamsuk
Fitness Coach	Vacant
Video Analyst	Vacant
Team Doctor	Vacant

== See also ==
- Sriracha F.C.
