= Ubon Kruanapat F.C. =

Thai football club

Ubon Kruanapat อุบล ครัวนภัส
- Full name: Ubon Kruanapat Football Club สโมสรฟุตบอลอุบล ครัวนภัส
- Nicknames: The Tigers (พยัคฆ์ร้ายแห่งแม่น้ำมูล)
- Short name: UBONFC
- Founded: 2009; 17 years ago
- Ground: Ubon Rachathani Sports School Stadium; Ubon Rachathani, Thailand
- Capacity: 2,000
- Chairman: Pongsak Moolsan
- Head coach: Jetsadakorn Hemdaeng (player-manager)
- League: Thai League 3
- 2025–26: Thai League 3, 5th of 12 in the Northeastern region
Home colours	Away colours

Ubon Kruanapat Football Club (Thai สโมสรฟุตบอลอุบล ครัวนภัส), is a Thai professional football club based in Ubon Ratchathani Province. The club was formed in 2009 and entered the Thai League 3 Northeastern region.

== History ==
=== Ubon Tiger F.C. ===
In 2009, The club is formed by Sports Association of Ubon Ratchathani competed in the Regional League Division 2 (North Eastern Region) for the 2009 season. but withdrew from the league after playing 16 games, due to a dispute with the Thailand Football Association (FAT).

In 2010, The club was renamed Ubon Tiger F.C. and returned to send the team again in the Regional League Division 2 North Eastern Region.

=== Ubon Ratchathani F.C. ===
In 2012, the club was renamed Ubon Ratchathani F.C. and competed in the Regional League Division 2 (North Eastern Region).

=== Ubon UMT F.C. ===
In 2013, The club it is sponsored by The Eastern University of Management and Technology (UMT) and renamed to Ubon UMT F.C.. competed in the Regional League Division 2 (North Eastern Region) for the 2013 season.

=== Ubon Ratchathani F.C. ===
In 2012, the club was renamed Ubon Ratchathani F.C. after that The Eastern University of Management and Technology (UMT) a request for the establishment of Ubon UMT United F.C. And competed in the Regional League Division 2 (North Eastern Region) for the 2015 season. It is their 5th season in the professional league.

=== Ubon Kruanapat F.C. ===
In 2022, Ubon Kruanapat competed in the Thai League 3 for the 2022–23 season. It is their 13th season in the professional league. The club started the season with a 6–0 home win over Sakon Nakhon and they ended the season with a 1–0 away win over Sakon Nakhon. The club has finished 5th place in the league of the Northeastern region. In addition, in the 2022–23 Thai League Cup Ubon Kruanapat was penalty shoot-out defeated 3–4 by Surin Khong Chee Mool in the first qualification round, causing them to be eliminated.

=== Crest history ===
2015–2019

2020–Present

== Name changes ==
- 2010: Ubon Tiger F.C.
- 2012: Ubon Ratchathani F.C.
- 2013: Ubon UMT F.C.
- 2015: Ubon Ratchathani F.C.
- 2020: Ubon Kruanapat F.C.

== Stadium and locations ==
Coordinates	Location	Stadium	Capacity	Year
15°15′06″N 104°50′53″E	Ubon Ratchathani	Ubon Rachathani Sports School Stadium (Opposite of Ubon Lotus's supermarket)	?	2010
15°07′36″N 104°55′03″E	Ubon Ratchathani	Ubon Ratchathani University Stadium	2,945	2011
15°15′06″N 104°50′53″E	Ubon Ratchathani	Ubon Rachathani Sports School Stadium (Opposite of Ubon Lotus's supermarket)	?	2012–2016
15°07′36″N 104°55′03″E	Ubon Ratchathani	Ubon Ratchathani University Stadium	2,945	2017
15°15′06″N 104°50′53″E	Ubon Ratchathani	Ubon Rachathani Sports School Stadium (Opposite of Ubon Lotus's supermarket)	2,000	2017–present

== Season by season record ==
Season	League									FA Cup	League Cup	T3 Cup	Top goalscorer	
Season	Division	P	W	D	L	F	A	Pts	Pos	FA Cup	League Cup	T3 Cup	Name	Goals
2010	Northeast	30	8	5	17	28	47	29	14th	Opted out	QR		(Thailand) Surasak Thongkae	8
2011	Northeast	30	3	9	18	30	64	18	15th	Opted out	QR1		(Cameroon) Christian Fokou	11
2012	Northeast	30	2	11	17	23	55	17	16th	Opted out	QR1			
2013	Northeast	30	14	9	7	41	29	51	3rd	Opted out	Opted out		(Thailand) David Srangnanaok	
2014	Northeast	26	19	5	2	84	23	62	1st	Opted out	R1		(Cameroon) Elvis Job	30
2014	Champions League	10	4	2	4	21	15	14	4th				(Cameroon) Elvis Job	30
2015	Northeast	34	15	12	7	52	36	57	7th	Opted out	Opted out		(South Korea) Kim Ji Hun	18
2016	Northeast	26	15	8	3	47	28	53	2nd	Opted out	QR1		(Cameroon) Bouba Abbo	12
2016	Champions League	2	0	0	2	0	5	0	R1				(Cameroon) Bouba Abbo	12
2017	T3 Upper	26	6	8	12	36	47	26	13th	Opted out	Opted out		(Cameroon) Bouba Abbo	10
2018	T3 Upper	26	9	5	12	29	36	32	6th	Opted out	Opted out		(Cameroon) Bouba Abbo (Egypt) Ahmed Abdalazen	6
2019	T3 Upper	24	8	6	10	23	35	30	7th	Opted out	QR2		(Thailand) Nattapon Tabtanon	7
2020–21	T3 Northeast	15	8	3	4	25	21	27	4th	Opted out	QR2		(Thailand) Saran Srideth	8
2021–22	T3 Northeast	24	13	3	8	45	25	42	4th	Opted out	Opted out		(Ghana) Oscar Plape	13
2022–23	T3 Northeast	24	11	5	8	35	30	38	5th	Opted out	QR1		(Ghana) Oscar Plape	18
2023–24	T3 Northeast	24	11	7	6	42	21	40	6th	Opted out	Opted out	R1	(Thailand) Anurak Mungdee	9
2024–25	T3 Northeast	20	10	3	7	31	20	33	4th	Opted out	QR2	LP	(Thailand) Thakdanai Phamchungkung	9
2025–26	T3 Northeast	22	9	6	7	28	28	33	5th	Opted out	QR1	LP	(Thailand) Thakdanai Phamchungkung	8

Champions	Runners-up	Third place	Promoted	Relegated

- P = Played
- W = Games won
- D = Games drawn
- L = Games lost
- F = Goals for
- A = Goals against
- Pts = Points
- Pos = Final position
- QR1 = First Qualifying Round
- QR2 = Second Qualifying Round
- R1 = Round 1
- R2 = Round 2
- R3 = Round 3
- R4 = Round 4
- R5 = Round 5
- R6 = Round 6
- QF = Quarter-finals
- SF = Semi-finals
- RU = Runners-up
- W = Winners

== Players ==
=== Current squad ===
As of 25 September 2024

Note: Flags indicate national team as defined under FIFA eligibility rules; some limited exceptions apply. Players may hold more than one non-FIFA nationality.

No.	Pos.	Nation	Player
1	GK	THA	Ratchanasak Buarapha
2	DF	THA	Kittipoom Bunsong
3	DF	THA	Issarapap Saenthep
4	DF	THA	Satja Sangsuwan
5	MF	THA	Chatchawan Thipluecha
6	MF	THA	Wanchaiya Charoenloi
7	MF	THA	Pakkanan Meecheu
8	MF	THA	Terdsak Samat
9	FW	NGA	Jibril Abubakar
10	FW	THA	Thapoppon Butkaew
11	FW	GHA	Oscar Plape
14	FW	THA	Thakdanai Phamchungkung
15	DF	THA	Phiraphon Thongluan

No.	Pos.	Nation	Player
16	FW	THA	Yutthaphum Noosalung
17	DF	THA	Phitakpong Chaiyapho
19	MF	THA	Wisanu Choedchu
20	DF	THA	Pongsapak Kosalanon
21	FW	THA	Dechawat Boonsan
22	GK	THA	Nawin Tanaluthai
23	GK	THA	Sirisak Kaewko
25	MF	THA	Nonthawat Latda
26	DF	THA	Watthana Thongkham
28	DF	THA	Suparchok Muanmanat
29	DF	THA	Thanongsak Suksupan
30	MF	CGO	Nathan Kabangu

== Club staff ==
Position	Name
President	Pongsak Moolsan
Vice-President	Phatthawat Wajadee; Phanu Matchima; Akkarapong Sonsuphap
Club director	Surasak Surawong
Club Secretary	Narisara Thongkhan
Team manager	Worachak Chantathong
Head coach	Kittiyut Phutthakru
Assistant coach	Thanongsak Suksuphan; Weerapong Chaiphan
Sports scientist	Phisan Bothong

== Honours ==
- Regional League North-East Division
  - Winners : 2014
  - Runners-up : 2016
