= Mueang Surin district =

Mueang Surin เมืองสุรินทร์
- District
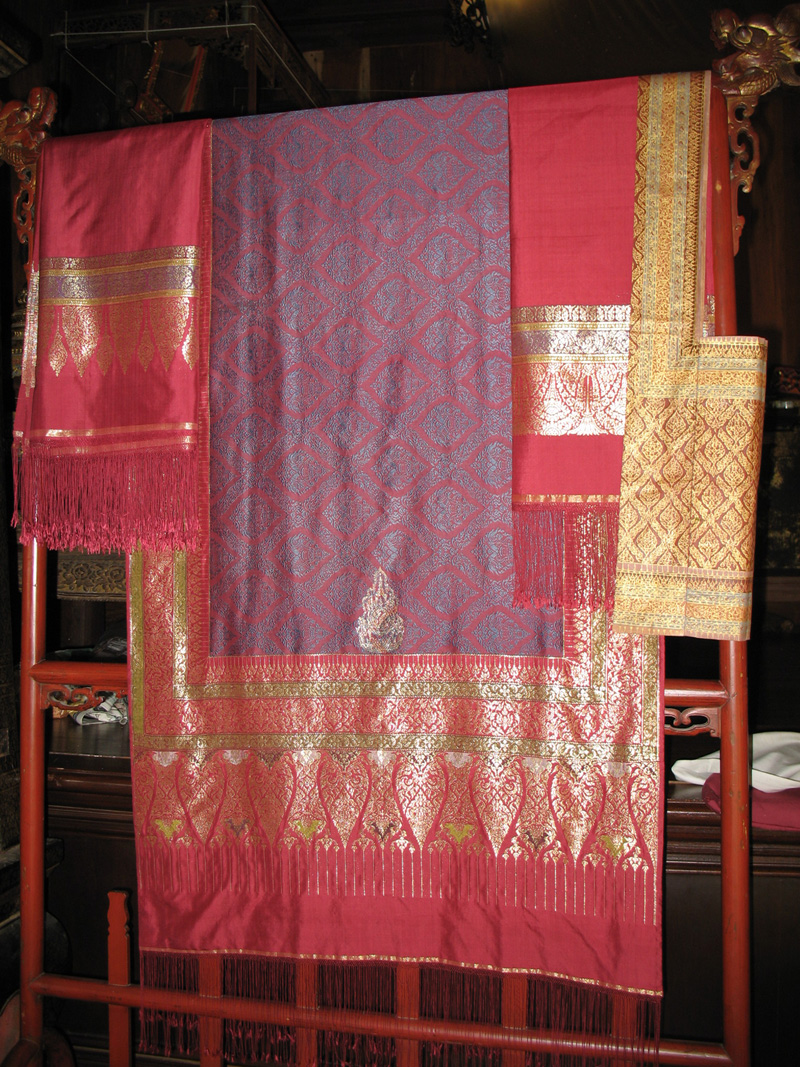
- Tambon Tha Sawang Silk Weaving, well-known handicraft of Mueang Surin

- District location in Surin province
- Coordinates: 14°52′54″N 103°29′36″E
- Country: Thailand
- Province: Surin
- Seat: Nai Mueang

Area
  - Total: 915.1 km^{2} (353.3 sq mi)

Population (2008)
  - Total: 257,845
  - Density: 281.1/km^{2} (728/sq mi)
- Time zone: UTC+7 (ICT)
- Postal code: 32000
- Geocode: 3201

Mueang Surin (Thai: เมืองสุรินทร์, pronounced [mɯ̄a̯ŋ sù.rīn]) is the capital district (amphoe mueang) of Surin province, northeastern Thailand.

== Geography ==
Neighboring districts are (from the north clockwise): Chom Phra, Khwao Sinarin, Sikhoraphum, Lamduan and Prasat of Surin Province; Krasang and Satuek of Buriram province.

== Administration ==
The district is divided into 21 sub-districts (tambons), which are further subdivided into 292 villages (mubans). The town (thesaban mueang) Surin covers the whole tambon Nai Mueang. Mueang Thi is a sub-district municipality (thesaban tambon) which covers parts of tambon Mueang Thi. There are a further 20 tambon administrative organizations (TAO).

No.	Name	Thai	Villages	Pop.
1.	Nai Mueang	ในเมือง	-	40,295
2.	Tang Chai	ตั้งใจ	9	5,586
3.	Phia Ram	เพี้ยราม	16	7,728
4.	Na Di	นาดี	17	13,510
5.	Tha Sawang	ท่าสว่าง	21	16,450
6.	Salakdai	สลักได	16	11,001
7.	Ta Ong	ตาอ็อง	16	10,563
9.	Samrong	สำโรง	15	9,275
10.	Kae Yai	แกใหญ่	13	9,226
11.	Nok Mueang	นอกเมือง	22	30,442
12.	Kho Kho	คอโค	12	10,067
13.	Sawai	สวาย	14	13,024
14.	Chaniang	เฉนียง	20	11,764
16.	Thenmi	เทนมีย์	14	10,941
18.	Na Bua	นาบัว	19	12,554
19.	Mueang Thi	เมืองที	14	10,741
20.	Ram	ราม	13	8,929
21.	Bu Rue Si	บุฤาษี	10	6,939
22.	Trasaeng	ตระแสง	12	7,291
25.	Salaeng Phan	แสลงพันธ์	9	6,155
26.	Ka Ko	กาเกาะ	12	5,364

Missing numbers now form Khwao Sinarin District.
