= Institute of Physical Education Udon Thani Stadium =

Stadium in Udon Thani, Thailand

Thai National Sports University Udon Thani Campus Stadium
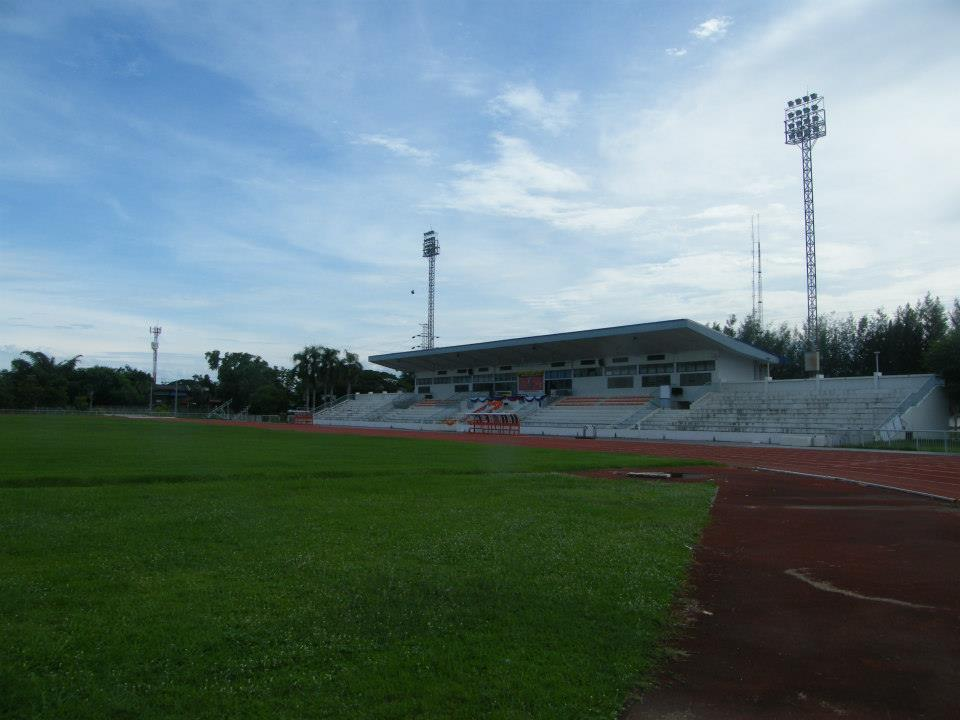
- Interactive map of Thai National Sports University Udon Thani Campus Stadium
- Location: Udon Thani, Thailand
- Coordinates: 17°24′19.58″N 102°46′9.00″E
- Owner: Institute of Physical Education
- Operator: Institute of Physical Education
- Capacity: 3,500
- Surface: Grass

Construction
- Opened: N/A

Tenant
- Udon Thani F.C.

Institute Of Physical Education Udon Thani Stadium (Thai: สนามกีฬา สถาบันการพลศึกษา วิทยาเขตอุดรธานี) is a stadium in Udon Thani Province, Thailand. It is currently used for football matches and is the home stadium of Udon Thani F.C. in the Thai League 2. The stadium holds 3,500 spectators.
