= 2025–26 Thai League 2 =

Thai League 2
- Season: 2025–26
- Dates: 15 August 2025 – 23 May 2026
- Champions: Rasisalai United
- Promoted: Rasisalai United; Sisaket United; Pattani
- Relegated: Bangkok; Nakhon Si United; Trat
- Matches: 306
- Goals: 845 (2.76 per match)
- Top goalscorer: Arthit Boodjinda (18 Goals)
- Biggest home win: 6 goals total Trat 6–0 Nakhon Si United (14 September 2025)
- Biggest away win: 6 goals total Phrae United 0–6 Mahasarakham (1 February 2026)
- Highest scoring: 9 goals total Khonkaen United 4–5 Nakhon Si United (28 September 2025); Nongbua Pitchaya 6–3 Police Tero (28 March 2026)
- Longest winning run: 7 matches Police Tero
- Longest unbeaten run: 18 matches Rasisalai United
- Longest winless run: 10 matches Trat
- Longest losing run: 5 matches Bangkok; Chiangmai United; Nakhon Pathom United; Trat
- Highest attendance: 12,800; Pattani 2–1 Nongbua Pitchaya (23 May 2026)
- Lowest attendance: 237; Rasisalai United 0–3 Chainat Hornbill (25 January 2026)
- Total attendance: 494,641
- Average attendance: 1,616
- All statistics correct as of 23 May 2026.

The 2025–26 Thai League 2 was the 28th season of the Thai League 2, the second-tier professional league for Thailand's association football clubs, since its establishment in 1997. This league also known as BYD Seal 5 League II due to the sponsorship deal with BYD Auto. A total of 18 teams competed in the league. The season began on 15 August 2025 and concluded on 23 May 2026.

For this season two teams in the final table (champion and runner up) directly promoted to Thai League 1 next season while teams ranked 3rd – 6th qualified in play off for last spot in top tier next season.

The 1st transfer window is from 1 July to 28 August 2025 while the 2nd transfer window is from 15 December 2025 to 16 January 2026.

== Overview ==
=== Promotion and relegation (pre-season) ===
18 teams will compete in the league – the twelve teams from previous season, three teams relegated from Thai League 1 and three teams promoted from Thai League 3.

==== Teams relegated from Thai League 1 ====
Khonkaen United, Nakhon Pathom United and Nongbua Pitchaya were relegated after four, two and one years, respectively.

==== Teams promoted from Thai League 3 ====
Rasisalai and Songkhla became the first two teams to be promoted on 7 June 2025 after both teams reached the final of the Thai League 3 knockout stage. Rasisalai United were also crowned champions by defeating Songkhla 5–1 on aggregate. Pattani became the last team to be promoted after their win against North Bangkok University 2–1 on aggregate in the promotion play-off.

Rasisalai United, Songkhla and Pattani will play in the second tier for first time in their history for this season.

==== Teams relegated to Thai League 3 ====
Samut Prakan City was shut down after withdrawing due to finances, while Lampang folded following the end of the previous season.

As such, Suphanburi were the only team relegated, after three years in the second tier.

== Teams ==
=== Changes ===
The following teams have changed division since the 2024–25 season.

==== To Thai League 2 ====
Promoted from the Thai League 3

- Rasisalai United
- Songkhla
- Pattani

Relegated from the Thai League 1

- Khonkaen United
- Nakhon Pathom United
- Nongbua Pitchaya

==== From Thai League 2 ====
Promoted to the Thai League 1

- Chonburi
- Ayutthaya United
- Kanchanaburi Power

Relegated to the Thai League 3

- Suphanburi

Dissolved team

- Samut Prakan City
- Lampang

=== Teams by province ===
Rank	Province	Number	Teams
1	(Bangkok) Bangkok^{1}	3	Bangkok, Kasetsart and Police Tero
2	(Sisaket province) Sisaket	2	Rasisalai United and Sisaket United
3	(Chai Nat province) Chai Nat	1	Chainat Hornbill
3	(Chanthaburi province) Chanthaburi	1	Chanthaburi
3	(Chonburi province) Chonburi	1	Pattaya United
3	(Chiang Mai province) Chiang Mai	1	Chiangmai United
3	(Khon Kaen province) Khon Kaen	1	Khonkaen United
3	Maha Sarakham	1	Mahasarakham
3	(Nakhon Pathom province) Nakhon Pathom	1	Nakhon Pathom United
3	(Nakhon Si Thammarat province) Nakhon Si Thammarat	1	Nakhon Si United
3	(Nong Bua Lamphu province) Nong Bua Lamphu	1	Nongbua Pitchaya
3	(Pattani province) Pattani	1	Pattani
3	(Phrae province) Phrae	1	Phrae United
3	(Songkhla province) Songkhla	1	Songkhla
3	Trat	1	Trat

1. Special administrative area.

=== Stadiums and locations ===
Locations of teams in the 2025–26 Thai League 2
Locations of teams in the 2025–26 Thai League 2 from Bangkok Metropolitan Region

Team	Location	Stadium	Capacity	2024–25 season
Bangkok	Bang Mot	Bangmod Stadium	8,000	8th in Thai League 2
Chainat Hornbill	Chai Nat	Khao Plong Stadium	12,000	14th in Thai League 2
Chanthaburi	Chanthaburi	Chanthaburi Province Stadium	5,000	13th in Thai League 2
Chiangmai United	Chiang Mai	Chiang Mai Rajabhat University Stadium	5,000	12th in Thai League 2
Kasetsart	Chatuchak	Insee Chantarasatit Stadium	3,000	7th in Thai League 2
Khonkaen United^{↓}	Khon Kaen	Khon Kaen PAO Stadium	6,500	16th in Thai League 1
Mahasarakham	Maha Sarakham	Mahasarakham Province Stadium	4,500	5th in Thai League 2
Nakhon Pathom United^{↓}	Nakhon Pathom	Nakhon Pathom Municipality Sport School Stadium	5,000	15th in Thai League 1
Nakhon Si United	Nakhon Si Thammarat	Nakhon Si Thammarat PAO Stadium	5,000	9th in Thai League 2
Nongbua Pitchaya^{↓}	Nong Bua Lamphu	Pitchaya Stadium	6,000	14th in Thai League 1
Pattani^{↑}	Pattani	Rainbow Stadium	12,000	Promotion play-off winner
Pattaya United	Chonburi (Bang Lamung)	Nong Prue Stadium	5,500	16th in Thai League 2
Phrae United	Phrae	Huayma Stadium	3,000	3rd in Thai League 2
Police Tero	Lak Si	NT Stadium	5,000	11th in Thai League 2
Rasisalai United^{↑}	Rasi Salai	Sisaket Provincial Stadium	2,500	Thai League 3 Champion
Sisaket United	Mueang Sisaket	Sri Nakhon Lamduan	11,200	10th in Thai League 2
Songkhla^{↑}	Mueang Songkhla	Tinsulanonda Stadium	20,000	Thai League 3 Runner-up
Trat	Trat	Trat Provincial Stadium	5,000	15th in Thai League 2

^{↓}	Relegated from the Thai League 1
^{↑}	Promoted from the Thai League 3

=== Personnel and kits ===
Note: Flags indicate national team as has been defined under FIFA eligibility rules. Players and coaches may hold more than one non-FIFA nationality.

Team	Manager	Captain	Kit manufacturer	Main kit sponsor	Other kit sponsor(s)
Bangkok	(Thailand national football team) Supachai Komsilp	(Thailand national football team) Charyl Chappuis	(Thailand) FBT	AsiaSports	List: Front: Kirin, Idemitsu, Black Bull, Discover Sendai; Back: AsiaSports, MQDC; Sleeves: Nikon, Muang Thai Insurance, Duni; Shorts: None
Chainat Hornbill	(Thailand national football team) Laksana Kamruen	(Thailand national football team) Mongkonchai Kongjumpa	(Thailand) Warrix	Credence TH	List: Front: Isuzu Chainat, Black Canyon Coffee, BG Sports, Muang Thai Insurance; Back: Wangkanai; Sleeves: Thai AirAsia, Thammasat University; Shorts: None
Chanthaburi	(Thailand national football team) Thongchai Rungreangles	(Thailand national football team) Suppawat Srinothai	(Thailand) MSeven	Rock$Presso	List: Front: Ek Paniengtong Foundation; Back: Saha Sila Kaew Co. Ltd., Central Chanthaburi, Thai-Cambodian Border Trade and Tourism Association of Chanthaburi; Sleeves: None; Shorts: None
Chiangmai United	(Thailand national football team) Anucha Chaiyawong	(Thailand national football team) Kantapong Bandasak	(Thailand) Ideo Sport	Jele	List: Front: Chang; Back: Hylife Group, Speed Gym, Nuan Bakery, Rocket Bar; Sleeves: Thai AirAsia; Shorts: None
Kasetsart	(Cameroon national football team) William Constant	(France national football team) Ismaïl Sassi	(Thailand) Grand Sport	Atlantic	List: Front: None; Back: None; Sleeves: Leesatjanana; Shorts: None
Khonkaen United	TBA	(Thailand national football team) Wasan Homsan	(Thailand) Ego Sport	Bangchak	List: Front: Fitness First, Mitr Phol; Back: SixNature Airport; Sleeves: Leo, Ratchaphruek Hospital, Neotape; Shorts: None
Mahasarakham	(Thailand national football team) Dusit Chalermsan	(Brazil national football team) Leandro Assumpcao	(Thailand) Ego Sport	CC Steel	List: Front: Leo, Muang Thai Insurance, Sabai Ebike; Back: Sermthai Complex, DNA Soccer School, Choiz Fitness; Sleeves: Mahasarakham Design Advertising, TSL, Namman Muay, Kitiya School, Nikon, BG Sports; Shorts: None
Nakhon Pathom United	(Thailand national football team) Thongchai Sukkoki	(Thailand national football team) Parinya Autapol	(England) Umbro	Chang	List: Front: Jele, ICE-LED; Back: None; Sleeves: Supersports, Central Pattana, Muang Thai Insurance; Shorts: None
Nakhon Si United	(Scotland national football team) Steven McGarry	(Thailand national football team) Adisak Sensom-Eiad	(Spain) Kelme^{4}	Trifalga Data Centres^{5}	List: Front: Hydra Systems^{5}; Back: None; Sleeves: None; Shorts: None
Nongbua Pitchaya	(Thailand national football team) Sukrit Yothee	(Thailand national football team) Wutthichai Marom	(Thailand) Ego Sport	Leo	List: Front: JS.Sport, Udon Thani International School, Pitchaya, Muang Thai Insurance; Back: Solar Wing; Sleeves: Nongbua Pitchaya 10th Anniversary; Shorts: None
Pattani	(Thailand national football team) Harnarong Chunhakunakorn	(Thailand national football team) Ninuruddin Nideha	(Thailand) Maisz	Muang Thai Insurance	List: Front: Tu Yong Steel Trade; Back: Taman Indah, Elrah Exclusive Thailand, Dr. Worawit Baru; Sleeves: BG Sports, Roti De Forest, Regent; Shorts: None
Pattaya United	(Thailand national football team) Pipob On-Mo	(Thailand national football team) Narongrit Boonsuk	(Thailand) AI Sport	Mittare Insurance	List: Front: BG Sports, Thai Lion Air, Leo, Changthong, Ima Food & Coffee; Back: None; Sleeves: Loma Naklua Club; Shorts: None
Phrae United	(Thailand national football team) Ronachai Jinaket	(Thailand national football team) Laphonwich Sutthasen	(Thailand) PKP Sport	Muang Thai Insurance	List: Front: Chang, Phrae Sila, SAMART; Back: None; Sleeves: MKP; Shorts: None
Police Tero	(Brazil national football team) Bene Lima	(Thailand national football team) Sitthichok Tassanai	(Thailand) FBT	Chang	List: Front: Muang Thai Insurance, Tero Entertainment; Back: Wangkanai, JBP Paint, Major Group, Sport Thai Bavaria; Sleeves: Thai AirAsia, Muang Thai Life Assurance, Praew Gifts; Shorts: None
Rasisalai United	(Thailand national football team) Arnon Bandasak	(Thailand national football team) Somyot Pongsuwan	(Thailand) Energy Sport	Muang Thai Insurance	List: Front: RCTECH, Oshinei; Back: None; Sleeves: None; Shorts: None
Sisaket United	(Thailand national football team) Somchai Chuayboonchum	(Thailand national football team) Pansiri Sukunee	(Thailand) Ego Sport	Chang	List: Front: Muang Thai Life Assurance, Star Aire; Back: None; Sleeves: Isuzu Sisaket; Shorts: None
Songkhla	(Thailand national football team) Pattharaphon Molito (Interim)	(Thailand national football team) Ekkasit Chaobut	(Thailand) EightyEight Sport	Muang Thai Insurance	List: Front: Mark Hatyai, Coca-Cola, Sri Trang Group, Laguna Grand Hotel & Spa Songkhla; Back: BG Sports, Dairy Home, Thai Lion Air; Sleeves: Kohtaew Foods, TCB Insurance Broker, Fitwhey; Shorts: None
Trat	(Thailand national football team) Santi Chaiyaphuak	(Thailand national football team) Pornpreecha Jarunai	(Denmark) Hummel	Muang Thai Insurance	List: Front: Chang; Back: None; Sleeves: Soneva Kiri; Shorts: None

1. Interim.
2. Apparel made by club.
3. Apparel used for other competition.
4. Nakhon Si United used H3 as their apparel in the first half of the season.
5. Nakhon Si United were without a sponsor in the first half of the season.

=== Managerial changes ===
==== Pre-season ====
Team	Outgoing manager	Manner of departure	Date of vacancy	Replaced by	Date of appointment
Khonkaen United	(Thailand) Patipat Rorbru	Mutual consent	15 May 2025	(Thailand) Pipob On-Mo	31 May 2025
Bangkok FC	(Thailand) Kissakorn Krasaingoen	End of contract	30 May 2025	(Northern Ireland) Colum Curtis	12 June 2025
Nakhon Si United	(Thailand) Sarawut Wongmai	End of Interim spell	12 June 2025	(Thailand) Maka Hoprasaratsuk (Interim)	11 August 2025
Chainat Hornbill	(Thailand) Sarach Paungchup	Sacked	15 June 2025	(Thailand) Laksana Kamruen	16 June 2025

==== During the season ====
Team	Outgoing manager	Manner of departure	Date of vacancy	Position in table	Replaced by	Date of appointment
Bangkok FC	(Northern Ireland) Colum Curtis	Sacked	29 August 2025	18th	(Brazil) Jose Alves Borges	9 October 2025
Mahasarakham	(Thailand) Jakarat Tonhongsa	Sacked	21 September 2025	15th	(Thailand) Dusit Chalermsan	2 October 2025
Trat FC	(Thailand) Phayong Khunnaen	Sacked	1 October 2025		(Thailand) Manasawin Katikamchon (Interim)	1 October 2025
Nakhon Si United	(Thailand) Maka Hoprasaratsuk (Interim)	End of Interim spell	2 September 2025	12th	(Spain) Oriol Mohedano	11 September 2025
Police Tero	(Brazil) Jose Alves Borges	Moved to Head of Youth Development	06 September 2025	6th	(Thailand) Sinthaweechai Hathairattanakool	06 September 2025
Pattani	(Thailand) Nirun Atsawaphakdi	Resigned	05 October 2025	16th	(Thailand) Harnarong Chunhakunakorn	07 October 2025
Police Tero	(Thailand) Sinthaweechai Hathairattanakool	Sacked	28 October 2025	2nd	(Thailand) Phayong Khunnaen	6 November 2025
Nakhon Si United	(Spain) Oriol Mohedano	Sacked	29 October 2025	14th	(Germany) Jörg Steinebrunner	30 October 2025
Chanthaburi	(Thailand) Theerawekin Seehawong	Sacked	9 November 2025	10th	(Thailand) Patanapong Sripramote	10 November 2025
Khonkaen United	(Thailand) Pipob On-Mo	Sacked	12 November 2025	8th	(Thailand) Teerasak Po-on	15 November 2025
Bangkok FC	(Brazil) Jose Alves Borges	Sacked	14 December 2025	18th	(Thailand) Supachai Komsilp	15 December 2025
Pattaya United	(Brazil) Bene Lima	Sacked	15 December 2025	14th	(Thailand) Pipob On-Mo	29 December 2025
Kasetsart	(Thailand) Santi Chaiyaphuak	Sacked	21 December 2025	11th	(Thailand) Peeratat Phoruendee	23 December 2025
Chiangmai United	(Thailand) Anucha Chaiyawong (Interim)	End of Interim spell	27 December 2025	10th	(Thailand) Sarawut Wongmai	27 December 2025
Trat FC	(Thailand) Manasawin Katikamchon (Interim)	End of Interim spell	1 January 2026	18th	(Thailand) Santi Chaiyaphuak	1 January 2026
Phare United	(Thailand) Thongchai Rungreangles	Sacked	8 February 2026	11th	(Thailand) Ronachai Jinaket	8 February 2026
Chanthaburi	(Thailand) Pattanapong Sripramote	Sacked	11 February 2026	10th	(Thailand) Thongchai Rungreangles	11 February 2026
SongKhla	(Japan) Daiki Higuchi	Sacked	15 February 2026	14th	(Thailand) Pattharaphon Molito (Interim)	18 February 2026
Nakhon Si United	(Germany) Jörg Steinebrunner	Resigned	26 February 2026	17th	(Scotland) Steven McGarry	27 February 2026
Police Tero	(Thailand) Phayong Khunnaen	Moved To Club Advisor	18 March 2026	5th	(Brazil) Bene Lima	18 March 2026
Kasetsart	(Thailand) Peeratat Phoruendee	Sacked	22 March 2026	15th	(Cameroon) William Constant	23 March 2026
Khonkaen United	(Thailand) Teerasak Po-on	Resigned	28 April 2026	7th		
Bangkok FC	(Thailand) Supachai Komsilp	Sacked	29 April 2026	18th		

== Foreign players ==
Each team can register a maximum of five foreign players, including one player from the AFC and also one player from the AFF.

- Players named in **bold** indicates the player was registered during the mid-season transfer window.
- Former players named in italics are players that were out of squad or left the club within the season, after the pre-season transfer window, or in the mid-season transfer window, and at least had one appearance.

Note: Flags indicate national team as has been defined under FIFA eligibility rules. Players may hold more than one non-FIFA nationality.

Team	Player 1	Player 2	Player 3	AFC player	AFF player	Unregistered players	Former players
Bangkok	(Brazil) Dudu Lima	(Brazil) **Deyvison Fernandes**	(Japan) Takahiro Tezuka	(Australia) AJ Inia	(Philippines) Jarvey Gayoso	(Japan) Ryota Endo	(England) Ben Nugent (Canada) Marcus Haber
Chainat Hornbill	(Brazil) Amarildo	(Brazil) **Francisco Jota**	(Japan) Tatsuhide Shimizu	(South Korea) Jeong Ja-in			(Australia) Adolph Koudakpo
Chanthaburi	(Brazil) **Luan Costa**	(Brazil) **Weslley**	(Spain) Nacho Abeledo	(Australia) Caio de Godoy	(Malaysia) David Rowley		(Brazil) Rodrigo Maranhão (Brazil) Wander Luiz
Chiangmai United	(Algeria) Mouhoub Nait	(Brazil) Thiago Duchatsch	(South Korea) **Jeong Woo-geun**	(South Korea) Seo Min-guk	(Laos) **Sayfon Keohanam**		(Cameroon) Alex Mermoz (Germany) Arnold Suew
Kasetsart	(France) **Queran Verset**	(Ghana) **Lesley Ablorh**	(Tunisia) Ismaïl Sassi	(South Korea) Lee Jae-yong			(Japan) SteviaEgbus Mikuni (Japan) Taiga Kitajima
Khonkaen United	(Brazil) Felipe Amorim	(Ivory Coast) Amadou Ouattara	(Japan) Shunya Suganuma	(South Korea) Kim Ji-min			
Mahasarakham	(Brazil) Leandro Assumpção	(Brazil) **Wander Luiz**		(Japan) **Akito Saito**	(Myanmar) Lwin Moe Aung		(South Korea) Lee Jong-cheon (Brazil) Danilo (Brazil) Deyvison Fernandes
Nakhon Pathom United	(Brazil) **Douglas Tardin**	(Iran) Amir Hossein Nemati	(Japan) Kazutaka Sato	(Japan) **Taiga Matsunaga**			(France) Niang Serigne-Falou (South Korea) Jeong Woo-geun
Nakhon Si United	(Australia) Dylan Ruiz-Diaz	(Australia) Ivan Khosho	(Egypt) **Mohamed Essam**	(Australia) **Mustafa Amini**	(Malaysia) Annil Vigneswaran		(Japan) Ryosuke Nagasawa (Australia) Benjamin Dylan Bruckner
Nongbua Pitchaya	(Brazil) Caio Rodrigues	(Brazil) Jardel	(Cameroon) **Alex Mermoz**	(Japan) Kento Nagasaki	(Philippines) **Miguel Clarino**		(Serbia) Aleksander Mitrovic
Pattani	(Brazil) Carlos Neto	(Brazil) Felipe Nunes	(Brazil) Marlon Silva	(Japan) **Shuto Ono**	(Philippines) **Rico Andes**		(Myanmar) Thiha Htet Aung
Pattaya United	(Brazil) Gustavo Apis	(Brazil) **Gregory Rocha**	(Germany) **Arnold Suew**		(Philippines) Kristófer Reyes		(Timor-Leste) Pedro Henrique (Brazil) Washington Brandão (Brazil) Elias (Japan) **Kenta Hara**
Phrae United	(Brazil) **Filipe Vasconcelos**	(Brazil) **Judivan**	(Brazil) Nilson	(Japan) Taku Ito	(Myanmar) Zaw Min Tun		(Brazil) Caion
Police Tero	(Brazil) Valdo Soares	(Brazil) Wellington Smith	(Ghana) Isaac Honny		(Timor-Leste) **Pedro Henrique**		(South Korea) Go Seul-ki (Brazil) **Washington Brandão**
Rasisalai United	(Brazil) Alberto Gouvea	(Brazil) Gilberto Macena	(Brazil) Ramon Mesquita	(Iran) Hamed Bakhtiari			
Sisaket United	(Brazil) Fellipe Veloso	(Martinique) Steeven Langil	(Australia) **Adolph Koudakpo**	(South Korea) Kwon Dae-hee	(Philippines) **Dylan De Bruycker**		(Brazil) Judivan
Songkhla	(Brazil) Alex Flávio	(Brazil) **Caion**	(Brazil) Mosquito	(Australia) **Sebastian Scaroni**	(Philippines) **Chima Uzoka**		(South Korea) Kim Juchan (Brazil) Gregory Rocha
Trat	(Brazil) Phillerson	(Brazil) Crislan	(Brazil) **Rodrigo Maranhão**	(Japan) **SteviaEgbus Mikuni**	(Myanmar) Than Paing		(Japan) Akito Saito (Egypt) Mohamed Essam

=== Foreign players by confederation ===
Foreign players by confederation
AFC	Australia (4), Japan (10), Iran (1), Malaysia (3), Myanmar (3), Laos (1), Philippines (2), South Korea (9)
CAF	Algeria (1), Cameroon (1), Egypt (1), Ghana (1), Ivory Coast (1), Tunisia (1)
CONCACAF	Canada (1), Martinique (1)
CONMEBOL	Brazil (30)
OFC	
UEFA	England (1), Serbia (1), Spain (1)

== Standings ==
=== League table ===
Pos	Team	Pld	W	D	L	GF	GA	GD	Pts	Qualification or relegation
1	Rasisalai United (C, P)	34	20	11	3	64	35	+29	71	Promotion to 2026–27 Thai League 1
2	Sisaket United (P)	34	16	12	6	49	31	+18	60	Promotion to 2026–27 Thai League 1
3	Pattani (O, P)	34	16	10	8	49	45	+4	58	Qualification for promotion play-offs
4	Nongbua Pitchaya	34	16	6	12	59	59	0	54	Qualification for promotion play-offs
5	Police Tero	34	15	8	11	50	44	+6	53	Qualification for promotion play-offs
6	Chainat Hornbill	34	12	10	12	50	46	+4	46	Qualification for promotion play-offs
7	Khon Kaen United	34	11	12	11	60	52	+8	45 (Note: Khon Kaen United ahead on head-to-head points record; Khon Kaen United 4 pts, Mahasarakham SBT 1 pt.)	
8	Mahasarakham SBT	34	12	9	13	47	42	+5	45	
9	Trat (R)	34	12	8	14	49	53	−4	44	Relegation to 2026–27 Thai League 3 (Note: Trat was administratively relegated to the 2026–27 Thai League 3 for failing to meet Club Licensing standards.)
10	Phrae United	34	10	13	11	40	50	−10	43 (Note: Phrae United ahead on head-to-head record; Phrae United 3 pts (GD +1), Chiangmai United 3 pts (GD -1).)	
11	Chiangmai United	34	14	1	19	55	58	−3	43	
12	Pattaya United	34	10	12	12	45	42	+3	42	
13	Songkhla	34	11	8	15	37	46	−9	41	
14	Chanthaburi	34	10	10	14	44	46	−2	40	
15	Nakhon Pathom United	34	10	9	15	29	37	−8	39	
16	Kasetsart (Note: Kasetsart remained in the league after Trat failed to meet the Club Licensing criteria for the 2026–27 season, resulting in Kasetsart retaining their spot.)	34	9	11	14	46	49	−3	38	
17	Nakhon Si United (R)	34	8	12	14	32	54	−22	36	Relegation to 2026–27 Thai League 3
18	Bangkok (R)	34	9	8	17	40	56	−16	35	Relegation to 2026–27 Thai League 3

Source: Thai League
Rules for classification: 1) Points; 2) Head-to-head points; 3) Head-to-head goal difference; 4) Head-to-head goal scored; 5) Overall goal difference; 6) Overall goal scored; 7) Fair play points; 8) Play-off without extra time).
(C) Champions; (O) Play-off winners; (P) Promoted; (R) Relegated

=== Position by round ===
The table lists the positions of teams after each week of matches. In order to preserve chronological evolvements, any postponed matches are not included in the round at which they were originally scheduled, but added to the full round they were played immediately afterwards. For example, if a match is scheduled for matchday 13, but then postponed and played between days 16 and 17, it will be added to the standings for day 16.

Team ╲ Round	1	2	3	4	5	6	7	8	9	10	11	12	13	14	15	16	17	18	19	20	21	22	23	24	25	26	27	28	29	30	31	32	33	34
Rasisalai United	2	2	2	2	2	1	1	1	1	1	1	1	1	1	1	1	1	1	1	1	1	1	1	1	1	1	1	1	1	1	1	1	1	1
Sisaket United	17	8	10	10	5	8	5	4	4	6	6	5	4	4	4	4	4	3	3	3	3	3	3	3	2	2	2	2	2	2	2	2	2	2
Pattani	18	16	16	13	17	17	17	17	18	18	15	12	11	7	6	9	7	5	7	6	6	6	7	6	6	5	5	4	3	3	3	3	3	3
Nongbua Pitchaya	12	13	8	11	8	11	8	5	7	7	8	10	7	12	8	6	5	7	5	5	4	4	4	4	4	4	4	6	5	4	4	4	4	4
Police Tero	6	9	6	9	4	6	10	6	5	2	2	2	2	2	2	2	2	2	2	2	2	2	2	2	3	3	3	3	4	5	5	5	5	5
Chainat Hornbill	8	4	3	3	6	4	2	2	2	3	3	3	3	3	3	3	3	4	4	4	5	5	5	5	5	7	7	8	8	7	7	6	6	6
Khonkaen United	3	6	4	4	3	3	4	7	6	8	7	8	8	9	11	12	12	12	9	10	12	9	9	10	11	9	10	11	12	9	10	10	7	7
Mahasarakham	14	7	13	14	14	16	16	14	13	12	10	7	9	13	9	7	9	10	11	11	10	8	6	8	7	6	6	5	6	6	6	7	8	8
Trat	4	10	14	15	11	15	15	13	15	10	12	11	14	15	16	16	18	18	17	17	17	17	17	17	16	15	15	12	15	13	8	9	9	9
Phrae United	5	3	1	1	1	2	3	3	3	5	4	4	5	5	10	8	8	8	6	7	8	11	11	9	10	8	8	7	7	8	9	8	10	10
Chiangmai United	10	15	11	12	16	12	14	11	8	4	5	9	12	8	7	10	10	9	10	8	9	7	8	7	8	11	9	10	10	11	14	15	12	11
Pattaya United	9	11	7	8	12	9	7	10	9	13	14	15	13	10	12	13	14	13	15	15	15	13	15	15	15	14	14	15	14	14	13	13	13	12
Songkhla	7	5	12	5	7	5	6	8	10	11	9	6	6	11	13	14	13	14	13	13	13	15	14	14	13	16	12	13	11	12	11	11	11	13
Chanthaburi	15	14	9	7	9	13	13	9	11	9	11	13	10	6	5	5	6	6	8	9	7	10	10	11	9	10	11	9	9	10	12	12	14	14
Nakhon Pathom United	16	17	17	17	15	10	12	16	16	16	13	14	16	17	17	17	16	17	16	16	16	14	13	12	12	12	16	16	17	17	16	16	16	15
Kasetsart	11	12	15	16	13	7	11	15	14	15	17	17	15	16	14	11	11	11	12	12	11	12	12	13	14	13	13	14	13	15	15	14	15	16
Nakhon Si United	1	1	5	6	10	14	9	12	12	14	16	16	17	14	15	15	15	15	14	14	14	16	16	16	17	17	17	17	16	16	17	17	17	17
Bangkok	13	18	18	18	18	18	18	18	17	17	18	18	18	18	18	18	16	16	18	18	18	18	18	18	18	18	18	18	18	18	18	18	18	18

Leader and qualification to the 2026–27 Thai League
Promotion to the 2026–27 Thai League
Play off to the 2026–27 Thai League
Relegation to the 2026–27 Thai League 3

First match(es) will be played on 2025. Source: Thai League 2 2025–26

=== Result by round ===
Team ╲ Round	1	2	3	4	5	6	7	8	9	10	11	12	13	14	15	16	17	18	19	20	21	22	23	24	25	26	27	28	29	30	31	32	33	34
Bangkok	L	L	L	D	L	D	W	L	W	D	L	L	L	L	W	D	W	L	L	L	L	L	W	L	D	D	D	L	W	W	L	W	W	D
Chainat Hornbill	D	L	W	W	D	L	W	W	D	D	D	W	W	L	L	L	W	W	L	D	W	L	D	W	L	D	D	L	L	W	L	W	D	L
Chanthaburi	L	D	W	W	L	L	D	W	L	W	L	L	W	W	W	W	L	D	D	L	D	L	L	D	W	D	L	W	L	L	D	D	L	D
Chiangmai United	D	L	W	L	L	W	L	W	W	W	L	L	L	W	W	L	L	W	L	W	L	W	L	W	L	L	W	L	L	L	L	L	W	W
Kasetsart	D	D	L	W	W	L	D	L	D	L	L	L	W	L	W	W	D	W	L	D	W	L	L	D	D	D	D	W	L	L	D	W	L	L
Khonkaen United	W	L	W	D	W	D	L	L	W	L	D	D	D	D	L	L	D	W	W	D	L	W	D	D	L	W	D	L	L	W	W	L	W	D
Mahasarakham	L	W	L	D	D	D	L	W	D	D	W	W	L	L	W	W	L	L	L	D	W	W	W	L	W	W	D	W	D	L	L	L	L	D
Nakhon Pathom United	L	L	L	D	W	W	D	L	D	L	W	L	L	D	L	L	D	D	D	D	W	W	W	W	D	L	L	L	L	L	W	W	L	W
Nakhon Si United	W	W	L	D	L	L	W	L	D	L	L	D	L	W	L	L	W	D	W	D	L	D	L	D	W	D	D	D	L	D	L	L	W	D
Nongbua Pitchaya	L	D	W	L	W	L	W	W	D	D	L	L	W	L	W	W	W	L	W	W	W	D	W	W	L	L	L	W	D	L	W	W	L	D
Pattani	L	D	L	W	L	D	D	D	L	D	W	W	W	W	W	L	W	W	L	D	W	L	L	W	D	W	D	W	W	W	W	D	W	D
Pattaya United	D	D	W	D	L	D	W	L	D	L	D	L	W	W	L	L	L	D	L	W	L	W	L	L	D	W	D	L	W	D	W	D	D	W
Phrae United	W	W	W	W	D	D	L	D	L	D	W	D	L	L	W	D	D	D	W	L	L	L	L	W	D	W	W	D	L	D	D	D	L	L
Police Tero	W	L	W	L	W	L	L	W	W	W	W	W	W	W	D	W	D	D	W	D	W	L	D	L	L	L	D	D	L	W	L	L	W	D
Rasisalai United	W	W	D	D	W	W	W	D	W	W	D	W	D	W	W	W	W	W	L	L	D	W	D	W	D	L	D	W	W	W	D	W	W	D
Sisaket United	L	W	D	D	W	L	W	W	D	D	L	W	W	L	D	W	W	D	W	D	W	W	W	W	L	D	W	D	W	L	D	D	D	W
Songkhla	W	D	L	W	L	W	L	D	L	D	W	W	L	L	L	L	D	L	W	D	L	L	W	L	W	L	W	D	W	D	W	D	L	L
Trat	W	L	L	L	W	L	L	W	L	W	D	D	L	L	L	L	L	D	D	D	W	L	W	W	W	D	W	L	W	W	W	L	D	D

First match(es) will be played on 15 August 2025. Source: Thai League 2 2025–26

== Promotion play-offs ==
=== Bracket ===
Semifinal
5	Police Tero	2	1	3
4	Nongbua Pitchaya	1	3	4
6	Chainat Hornbill	1	1	2
3	Pattani	3	2	5

Final
4	Nongbua Pitchaya	2	1	3 (4)
3	Pattani (p)	1	2	3 (5)

=== Matches ===
Semifinal 1

3 May 2026
18:00 UTC+7

Police Tero	2–1	Nongbua Pitchaya
Wutthichai Marom 4' (o.g.); Pedro Henrique 53'		Jardel Capistrano 57'

NT Stadium, Lak Si, Bangkok
Attendance: 1,890
Referee: Veeraporn Maophaeo (Thailand)
9 May 2026
18:00 UTC+7

Nongbua Pitchaya	3–1	Police Tero
Jakkrawut Songma 4', 24'; Thanawut Phochai 72'		Isaac Honny 74'

Pitchaya Stadium, Mueang Nong Bua Lam Phu, Nong Bua Lamphu
Attendance: 2,124
Referee: Ekkachai Phetcham (Thailand)

Nongbua Pitchaya won 4–3 on aggregate.

Semifinal 2

2 May 2026
18:00 UTC+7

Chainat Hornbill	1–3	Pattani
Amarildo 69'		Marlon Silva 12', 71'; Imron Hayiyusoh 61'

Khao Plong Stadium, Mueang Chai Nat, Chai Nat
Attendance: 1,545
Referee: Narinnart Tiamskun (Thailand)
9 May 2026
18:00 UTC+7

Pattani	2–1	Chainat Hornbill
Marlon Silva 43'; Ittipon Khampliw 45+2'		Francisco Jota 61'

Rainbow Stadium, Mueang Pattani, Pattani
Attendance: 7,225
Referee: Chaiya Moolmanee (Thailand)

Pattani won 5–2 on aggregate.

Final

16 May 2026
18:00 UTC+7

Nongbua Pitchaya	2–1	Pattani
Jakkrawut Songma 20'; Peeranan Buakhai 72'		Carlos Neto 7'

Pitchaya Stadium, Mueang Nong Bua Lam Phu, Nong Bua Lamphu
Attendance: 3,012
Referee: Pawara Seejen (Thailand)
23 May 2026
18:00 UTC+7

Pattani	2–1 (a.e.t.)	Nongbua Pitchaya
Marlon Silva 24', 90+5'		Jakkrawut Songma 45+5'
Penalties
Kittipong Buathong (penalty scored); Janepob Phokhi (penalty scored); Tinnakorn Asurin (penalty scored); Ekkachai Sumrei (penalty scored); Marlon Silva (penalty scored)	5–4	Jardel Capistrano (penalty scored); Caio Rodrigues (penalty scored); Kento Nagasaki (penalty missed); Alex Mermoz (penalty scored); Thanawut Phochai (penalty scored)

Rainbow Stadium, Mueang Pattani, Pattani
Attendance: 12,800
Referee: Peerasan Krataithong (Thailand)

3–3 on aggregate. Pattani won 5–4 on penalties.

== Results ==
=== Fixture and result ===
Home \ Away	BKC	CHB	CTB	CMU	KSC	KKU	MSK	NPU	NSU	NON	PTN	PTY	PHR	PTE	RSL	SKU	SKA	TRA
Bangkok		1–1	0–3	0–1	2–1	1–3	2–2	0–0	2–0	0–3	1–2	1–1	2–2	1–0	0–2	1–2	1–0	1–1
Chainat Hornbill	1–1		1–4	3–1	2–3	2–1	0–1	1–1	1–0	3–0	0–1	1–2	1–1	2–1	1–1	2–0	4–3	2–0
Chanthaburi	1–2	1–2		2–0	1–0	2–1	1–2	1–3	1–0	1–0	1–2	2–2	2–3	1–1	2–2	1–0	2–0	2–2
Chiangmai United	3–2	3–4	1–0		1–1	3–2	2–0	0–1	5–1	3–0	2–4	1–2	1–0	4–1	1–2	0–2	2–1	0–1
Kasetsart	0–2	2–1	0–0	3–4		3–3	0–0	3–0	1–1	3–0	1–3	1–0	2–3	1–3	0–1	1–1	1–1	4–0
Khonkaen United	5–1	2–1	1–1	2–1	1–0		2–1	1–0	4–5	1–2	4–1	0–0	4–2	2–1	0–0	1–1	5–1	1–2
Mahasarakham	2–1	0–0	2–2	2–1	2–0	2–2		0–2	4–1	1–3	1–2	1–0	0–0	2–3	1–3	0–1	3–0	5–1
Nakhon Pathom United	0–3	0–1	2–0	2–5	0–1	0–0	0–1		1–1	3–1	0–0	1–1	0–1	1–0	0–1	0–0	1–0	0–1
Nakhon Si United	0–4	1–0	1–1	3–1	1–1	2–2	0–0	1–1		1–2	0–0	1–0	1–1	1–0	1–2	2–2	2–0	0–1
Nongbua Pitchaya	3–2	1–1	2–1	1–0	2–2	4–2	2–1	1–0	3–1		2–2	1–1	3–0	6–3	3–3	1–1	0–1	2–0
Pattani	1–1	3–2	2–1	4–3	3–3	3–1	2–1	0–1	0–3	2–1		1–1	3–1	0–1	1–1	0–0	1–0	2–1
Pattaya United	3–0	2–2	2–2	4–1	3–0	2–2	2–3	1–1	2–0	4–0	2–0		0–1	0–2	1–4	3–3	1–0	1–2
Phrae United	1–2	2–1	2–1	3–1	2–1	1–1	0–6	0–2	0–0	0–1	0–1	0–0		2–2	0–1	1–0	1–1	3–1
Police Tero	1–0	1–0	1–0	0–1	1–1	2–1	0–0	4–2	0–0	5–2	3–0	2–0	3–1		1–1	2–1	1–1	1–3
Rasisalai United	3–1	0–3	3–0	1–0	2–1	2–1	3–0	3–0	3–0	3–2	3–2	0–1	2–2	2–1		3–3	2–0	2–2
Sisaket United	3–1	1–1	1–0	2–0	1–3	0–0	1–0	2–1	3–0	2–1	2–0	1–0	2–2	1–1	1–0		5–1	3–1
Songkhla	3–0	2–0	1–1	2–1	2–1	1–0	1–1	0–2	0–1	5–2	1–1	2–1	0–0	3–0	1–1	1–0		1–0
Trat	2–1	3–3	2–3	0–2	0–1	2–2	2–0	2–1	6–0	1–2	0–0	3–0	2–2	1–2	2–2	0–1	2–1	

Updated to match(es) played on 25 April 2026. Source: Thai League 2 2025–26
Legend: Blue = home team win; Yellow = draw; Red = away team win.
For upcoming matches, an "a" indicates there is an article about the rivalry between the two participants.

== Season statistics ==
=== Top Goalscorers ===
As of 25 April 2026.

Rank	Player	Club	Goals
1	(Thailand) Arthit Boodjinda	Khonkaen United	18
2	(Brazil) Alberto Gouvea	Rasisalai United	17
3	(Brazil) Carlos Neto	Pattani	16
4	(Brazil) Amarildo	Chainat Hornbill	15
5	(Brazil) Jardel Capistrano	Nongbua Pitchaya	14
5	(Brazil) Gregory da Silva	Songkhla (3 Goals); Pattaya United (11 Goals)	14
5	(Brazil) Fellipe Veloso	Sisaket United	14
8	(Timor-Leste) Pedro Henrique	Pattaya United (9 Goals); Police Tero (4 Goals)	13
9	(Brazil) Caion	Phrae United (6 Goals); Songkhla (6 Goals)	12
10	(Spain) Nacho Abeledo	Chanthaburi	11
10	(Tunisia) Ismaïl Sassi	Kasetsart	11
10	(Cameroon) Alex Mermoz	Chiangmai United (6 Goals); Nongbua Pitchaya (5 Goals)	11
10	(Brazil) Gustavo Apis	Pattaya United	11
10	(Thailand) Nattapon Yongsakool	Rasisalai United	11
10	(Thailand) Kittipong Wongma	Sisaket United	11

=== Hat-trick ===
Player	For	Against	Result	Date
(Thailand) Nantawat Suankaew	Nakhon Si United	Khonkaen United	5–4 (A)	28 September 2025
(Brazil) Wellington Adão	Police Tero	Nakhon Pathom United	4–2 (H)	5 October 2025
(Brazil) Carlos Neto^{4}	Pattani	Chiangmai United	4–3 (H)	9 November 2025
(Timor-Leste) Pedro Henrique	Pattaya United	Nongbua Pitchaya	4–0 (H)	30 November 2025
(Thailand) Taninnat Athisaraworameth	Kasetsart	Chainat Hornbill	3–2 (A)	31 January 2026
(Spain) Nacho Abeledo^{4}	Chanthaburi	Chainat Hornbill	4–1 (A)	4 March 2026

=== Clean sheets ===
As of 25 April 2026.

Rank	Player	Club	Clean sheets
1	(Thailand) Kiadtisak Chaodon	Nakhon Pathom United	11
2	(Thailand) Pairot Eiammak	Mahasarakham	10
2	(Thailand) Sakkongpop Sukprasert	Rasisalai United	10
2	(Thailand) Adisak Lambelsah	Sisaket United	10
5	(Thailand) Prasit Padungchok	Sisaket United / Trat	8
6	(Thailand) Phumniwat Thuha	Chiangmai United	7
6	(Thailand) Prin Goonchorn	Kasetsart	7
6	(Thailand) Kiadtiphon Udom	Phrae United	7
9	(Thailand) Suppawat Srinothai	Chanthaburi	6
9	(Thailand) Kittisak Moosawat	Nongbua Pitchaya	6
9	(Thailand) Chommaphat Boonloet	Pattaya United	6
9	(Thailand) Anipong Kijkam	Police Tero	6
9	(Thailand) Samuel Cunningham	Songkhla	6

== Attendances ==
=== Overall ===
Pos	Team	Total	High	Low	Average	Change
1	Pattani	108,263	12,000	3,220	6,368	+84.7%^{‡}
2	Khonkaen United	57,974	4,248	2,879	3,410	−4.9%^{†}
3	Sisaket United	36,454	7,110	1,179	2,144	+7.5%
4	Mahasarakham	36,075	2,937	1,637	2,122	+4.3%
5	Pattaya United	29,837	2,422	1,344	1,755	0.0%
6	Rasisalai United	28,395	4,458	237	1,670	+272.8%^{‡}
7	Chainat Hornbill	24,729	1,999	1,095	1,455	+37.9%
8	Nongbua Pitchaya	23,413	2,515	993	1,377	−50.8%^{†}
9	Police Tero	21,686	2,788	859	1,276	+49.9%
10	Bangkok	20,389	2,273	736	1,199	−12.2%
11	Chanthaburi	20,288	1,989	659	1,193	−18.3%
12	Nakhon Pathom United	15,035	1,357	550	884	−56.4%^{†}
13	Songkhla	14,610	3,129	386	859	+63.3%^{‡}
14	Kasetsart	13,945	1,530	458	820	−38.2%
15	Trat	13,793	1,509	529	811	−5.4%
16	Chiangmai United	10,127	991	314	596	−36.1%
17	Phrae United	10,045	1,059	312	591	−56.8%
18	Nakhon Si United	9,583	1,575	277	564	−32.6%
	League total	494,641	12,000	237	1,616	+8.9%

Updated to games played on 25 April 2026
Source: Thai League 2 2025–26
Notes:
^{†} Teams played previous season in Thai League 1
^{‡} Teams played previous season in Thai League 3

=== Home match played ===
As of 25 April 2026

Team \ Match played	1	2	3	4	5	6	7	8	9	10	11	12	13	14	15	16	17	Total
Bangkok	2,273	1,471	1,276	1,157	1,271	998	975	964	1,010	931	749	907	917	1,950	1,311	1,067	1,162	20,389
Chainat Hornbill	1,229	1,889	1,689	1,999	1,915	1,889	1,275	1,272	1,372	1,383	1,556	1,135	1,189	1,195	1,272	1,095	1,375	24,729
Chanthaburi	1,509	1,798	1,061	1,176	1,026	909	1,067	891	1,127	1,326	1,472	1,280	737	659	1,066	1,195	1,989	20,288
Chiangmai United	570	355	428	413	314	840	978	991	652	655	758	542	641	457	407	591	535	10,127
Kasetsart	1,065	903	855	748	489	538	735	537	458	612	1,281	692	616	1,530	1,423	567	896	13,945
Khonkaen United	4,125	3,181	4,248	3,825	3,677	3,317	3,941	3,145	3,081	3,219	3,544	3,104	3,227	2,879	3,114	3,233	3,114	57,974
Mahasarakham	2,378	1,637	1,965	2,237	2,442	2,198	2,345	2,162	1,652	2,587	1,772	1,769	2,731	1,650	1,866	1,747	2,937	36,075
Nakhon Pathom United	1,050	890	880	1,200	875	1,357	780	759	875	816	897	956	856	754	550	550	990	15,035
Nakhon Si United	980	713	548	544	281	277	330	386	533	391	338	446	461	433	624	723	1,575	9,583
Nongbua Pitchaya	2,139	1,795	1,297	1,085	1,216	1,256	1,119	1,353	1,038	1,020	1,058	993	1,195	2,030	1,149	2,515	1,155	23,413
Pattani	3,728	5,772	5,135	3,220	3,411	5,655	12,000	9,965	8,912	7,842	3,575	4,690	4,235	4,365	6,223	12,000	7,535	108,263
Pattaya United	1,859	1,629	1,813	1,344	1,478	2,186	1,587	1,586	1,535	1,840	1,802	1,643	1,546	1,851	1,867	1,849	2,422	29,837
Phrae United	803	1,059	998	882	500	520	453	673	427	443	532	312	386	469	341	718	529	10,045
Police Tero	1,299	1,012	1,089	1,099	1,455	1,194	1,002	1,255	1,643	1,256	1,256	1,451	859	985	957	2,788	1,086	21,686
Rasisalai United	989	4,458	1,164	1,246	1,249	1,087	958	1,256	1,089	237	1,029	1,345	1,459	1,879	2,169	2,649	4,132	28,395
Sisaket United	1,900	2,147	1,462	1,884	1,330	1,236	1,179	1,283	1,212	1,602	4,313	1,413	1,301	2,264	2,327	2,491	7,110	36,454
Songkhla	1,098	3,129	1,040	682	896	457	723	587	825	413	386	606	559	695	644	890	980	14,610
Trat	1,265	1,509	1,082	939	790	707	898	539	569	655	569	539	529	739	925	715	824	13,793
League total																		494,641

Source: Thai League 2 2025–26

== See also ==
- 2025–26 Thai League 1
- 2025–26 Thai League 3
- 2025 Thailand Semi-pro League
- 2026 Thailand Semi-pro League
- 2025 Thailand Amateur League
- 2025–26 Thai FA Cup
- 2025–26 Thai League Cup
- 2025 Thailand Champions Cup
