= 2024–25 Thai League 2 =

Thai League 2
- Season: 2024–25
- Dates: 9 August 2024 – 24 May 2025
- Champions: Chonburi
- Promoted: Chonburi; Ayutthaya United; Kanchanaburi Power
- Relegated: Suphanburi
- Matches: 272
- Goals: 736 (2.71 per match)
- Top goalscorer: Wellington Adão (23 goals)
- Biggest home win: 5 goals totals Kanchanaburi Power 5–0 Nakhon Si United (21 September 2024); Chonburi 5–0 Sisaket United (22 February 2025); Phrae United 6–1 Suphanburi (14 March 2025); Ayutthaya United 5–0 Pattaya United (16 March 2025)
- Biggest away win: 6 goals totals Suphanburi 0–6 Pattaya United (20 October 2024)
- Highest scoring: 9 goals totals Chiangmai United 4–5 Nakhon Si United (16 February 2025)
- Longest winning run: 9 matches Phrae United
- Longest unbeaten run: 11 matches Kanchanaburi Power
- Longest winless run: 15 matches Suphanburi
- Longest losing run: 10 matches Suphanburi
- Highest attendance: 7,165; Chonburi 2-0 Pattaya United (18 April 2025)
- Lowest attendance: 0 Pattaya United 1–2 Kanchanaburi Power (8 March 2025)
- Total attendance: 423,625
- Average attendance: 1,557
- All statistics correct as of 26 April 2025.

The 2024–25 Thai League 2 is the 27th season of the Thai League 2, the second-tier professional league for Thailand's association football clubs, since its establishment in 1997. also known as Muang Thai League due to the sponsorship deal with Muang Thai Life Assurance and Muang Thai Insurance. A total of 18 teams will compete in the league. The season began on 9 August 2024 and is scheduled to conclude on 24 May 2025.

For this season, two teams in the final table (champion and runner up) are directly promoted to Thai League 1 next season, while teams ranked 3rd – 6th qualified for a play off for the last spot.

The first transfer window is from 7 June to 15 August 2023, while the second transfer window is from 9 December 2024 to 17 January 2025.

== Team changes ==
The following teams have changed division since the 2023–24 season.

=== To Thai League 2 ===
Promoted from Thai League 3

- Bangkok
- Sisaket United
- Mahasarakham SBT

Relegated from Thai League 1

- Chonburi
- Police Tero
- Trat

=== From Thai League 2 ===
Promoted to Thai League 1

- Nakhon Ratchasima
- Nongbua Pitchaya
- Rayong

Relegated to Thai League 3

- Chiangmai
- Customs United
- Krabi

=== Renamed Clubs ===
- Dragon Pathumwan Kanchanaburi renamed to Kanchanaburi Power.

== Teams ==
=== Stadium and locations ===
Team	Province	Stadium	Capacity
Ayutthaya United	Ayutthaya	Ayutthaya Provincial Stadium	6,000
Bangkok	Bangkok (Bang Mod)	72nd Anniversary Stadium	8,000
Chainat Hornbill	Chainat	Khao Plong Stadium	8,625
Chanthaburi	Chanthaburi	Chanthaburi Provincial Stadium	5,000
Chiangmai United	Chiang Mai	700th Anniversary Stadium	25,000
Chonburi	Chonburi (Mueang)	Chonburi Stadium	8,600
Kanchanaburi Power	Kanchanaburi	Kleeb Bua Stadium	13,000
Kasetsart	Bangkok (Chatuchak)	Insee Chantarasatit Stadium	3,275
Lampang	Lampang	Lampang Provincial Stadium	5,500
Mahasarakham	Mahasarakham	Mahasarakham Province Stadium	3,000
Nakhon Si United	Nakhon Si Thammarat	Nakhon Si Thammarat PAO. Stadium	5,000
Pattaya United	Chonburi (Bang Lamung)	Nong Prue Stadium	5,838
Phrae United	Phrae	Huay Ma Stadium	2,500
Police Tero	Bangkok (Lak Si)	Boonyachinda Stadium	3,550
Samut Prakan City	Samut Prakan	Customs Department Stadium, Ladkrabang 54	2,000
Sisaket United	Sisaket	Sri Nakhon Lamduan Stadium	9,500
Suphanburi	Suphanburi	Suphan Buri Provincial Stadium	15,279
Trat	Trat	Trat Provincial Stadium	5,000

Locations of the 2024–25 Thai League 2 teams
Football clubs in Bangkok Metropolitan Region

=== Personnel and sponsoring ===
Note: Flags indicate national team as has been defined under FIFA eligibility rules. Players may hold more than one non-FIFA nationality; Club dissolved during season would shown by grey background.

Team	Manager	Captain	Kit manufacturer	Main kit sponsor	Other kit sponsor(s)
Ayutthaya United	(Thailand) Jugkrit Siriwattanasart	TBA	(Thailand) Pegan Sport	Chang	List: Front: Muang Thai Insurance, Gulf, Tasaki; Back: Narawadee; Sleeves: Rojana Industrial; Shorts: None
Bangkok	(Thailand) Kissakorn Krasaingoen	(Thailand) Sakda Kumkun	(Thailand) FBT	Idemitsu	List: Front: Kirin, Asia Sports.com, Black Bull, Tsukiichi Shiya, Iris Ohyama, Discover Sendai; Back: MQDC; Sleeves: Nikon, Duni; Shorts: None
Chainat Hornbill	(Thailand) Sarach Paungchup	(Thailand) Mongkonchai Kongjumpa	(Thailand) Warrix	Wangkanai	List: Front: Idemitsu, BGF, Muang Thai Insurance, Isuzu Chainat, Black Canyon Coffee; Back: Sport Thai Bavaria; Sleeves: None; Shorts: None
Chanthaburi	(Thailand) Theerawekin Seehawong	(Thailand) Yannarit Sukcharoen	(Thailand) MSeven	Rock$Presso	List: Front: Ek Paniengtong Foundation, RBRU, Fit Mania, Tha Mai Physio Clinic; Back: Saha Sila Kaew Co. Ltd., Central Chanthaburi, Thai-Cambodian Border Trade and Tourism Association of Chanthaburi; Sleeves: None; Shorts: None
Chiangmai United	(Thailand) Anucha Chaiyawong	(Thailand) Thanawich Thanasasipat	(Thailand) Ideo Sport	VBeyond	List: Front: Muang Thai Life Insurance, Chang, Jele; Back: Jele, Speed Gym, Nuan Bakery, Rocket Bar by Routine; Sleeves: Thai AirAsia; Shorts: None
Chonburi	(Thailand) Thawatchai Damrong-Ongtrakul	TBA	(Thailand) FBT (League) (Thailand) YG (Cup)	Chang	List: Front: Euro Cake, Panasonic / WHA Group (Cup); Back: Est Cola, Daikin; Sleeves: WHA Group, Thai AirAsia, AIA, Samitivej Hospitals / YG (League); Shorts: None
Kanchanaburi Power	(Thailand) Dusit Chalermsan	(Thailand) Anuphan Koedsompong	(Thailand) Made by club	mMILK	List: Front: Leo, Innnex; Back: None; Sleeves: Mittare Insurance; Shorts: None
Kasetsart	(Thailand) Santi Chaiyaphuak	TBA	(Spain) Joma	Atlantic	List: Front: Tanowsri Traditional Chicken, Elfer; Back: None; Sleeves: Jetts Fitness, Carabao; Shorts: None
Lampang	(Thailand) Wittaya Dongyai	(Thailand) Seeket Madputeh	(Thailand) Ego Sport	Pitchaya	List: Front: Chang; Back: None; Sleeves: None; Shorts: None
Mahasarakham	(Thailand) Jakarat Tonhongsa	TBA	(Thailand) SBT Sportswear (made by club)	Leo	List: Front: Muang Thai Insurance, Somnuk Water Supply, MEE-KHWAN-SOOK; Back: Kitiya School, Sermthai Complex; Sleeves: CC Steel, Gatorade; Shorts: None
Nakhon Si United	(Thailand) Sarawut Wongmai (Interim)	TBA	(Thailand) H3	Thai Lion Air	List: Front: Muang Thai Insurance, The Tide Group; Back: None; Sleeves: Major Furniture Mall; Shorts: None
Pattaya United	(Germany) Dennis Amato	(Thailand) Supakit Niamkong	(Poland) 4F	Leo	List: Front: Mittare Insurance, Le Bua Coffee, Thai Lion Air, Safedeal; Back: The Brick Gym; Sleeves: Loma Naklua Club; Shorts: None
Phrae United	(Thailand) Thongchai Rungreangles	(Thailand) Rangsiman Sruamprakam	(Thailand) PKP Sport	SAMART	List: Front: Chang, Muang Thai Insurance, Phrae Sila; Back: None; Sleeves: TMG, MKP; Shorts: None
Police Tero	(Brazil) Jose Alves Borges	(Thailand) Sitthichok Tassanai	(Thailand) FBT	Chang	List: Front: Muang Thai Insurance, Tero Entertainment; Back: JBP Paint, Major Group, Mali Interdisciplinary Hospital; Sleeves: Thai AirAsia, Muang Thai Life Assurance; Shorts: None
Samut Prakan City	TBA	TBA	(Thailand) WOW Sport	None	List: Front: Chang; Back: Horse; Sleeves: Major Group; Shorts: None
Sisaket United	(Thailand) Suriyant Chaemchaeng (Interim)	TBA	(Thailand) Ego Sport	Chang	List: Front: Muang Thai Life Assurance, Star Aire; Back: None; Sleeves: None; Shorts: None
Suphanburi	(Thailand) Issara Sritaro	(Thailand) Jetjinn Sriprach	(Thailand) Volt	Chang	List: Front: The Fitness Society; Back: None; Sleeves: Mitr Phol, Robinson Lifestyle; Shorts: None
Trat	(Thailand) Phayong Khunnaen	TBA	(Thailand) Volt	Muang Thai Insurance	List: Front: Chang; Back: Bangkok Airways; Sleeves: Soneva Kiri; Shorts: None

=== Managerial changes ===
Team	Outgoing manager	Manner of departure	Date of vacancy	Position in the table	Incoming manager	Date of appointment
Nakhon Si United	(Thailand) Harnarong Chunhakunakorn	End of contract	25 May 2024	Pre-season	(Thailand) Thongchai Sukkoki	2 June 2024
Police Tero	(Malaysia) Tan Cheng Hoe	End of contract	25 May 2024	Pre-season	(Thailand) Thawatchai Damrong-Ongtrakul	20 June 2024
Lampang	(Thailand) Kisthachai Wongsim	End of contract	25 May 2024	Pre-season	(Thailand) Wittaya Dongyai	29 June 2024
Trat	(Thailand) Santi Chaiyaphuak	End of contract	25 May 2024	Pre-season	(Thailand) Krongpol Daorueang	2 July 2024
Kasetsart	(Thailand) Pattarapol Naprasert	End of contract	25 May 2024	Pre-season	(Thailand) Santi Chaiyaphuak	10 July 2024
Chiangmai United	(Thailand) Surachai Jirasirichote	End of contract	25 May 2024	Pre-season	(Venezuela) Jeffrén Suárez	4 Aug 2024
Suphanburi	(Thailand) Sarawut Treephan	Mutual consent	5 Aug 2024	Pre-season	(Thailand) Issara Sritaro	5 Aug 2024
Chiangmai United	(Venezuela) Jeffrén Suárez	Sacked	10 September 2024	16th	(Thailand) Anucha Chaiyawong	11 September 2024
Pattaya United	(Thailand) Theerawekin Seehawong	Resigned	17 September 2024	16th	(Germany) Dennis Amato	19 September 2024
Kanchanaburi Power	(Thailand) Somchai Makmool	Sacked	6 October 2024	14th	(Thailand) Ranon Intharatul (Interim)	8 October 2024
Trat	(Thailand) Krongpol Daorueang	Sacked	9 October 2024	10th	(Thailand) Somchai Makmool	10 October 2024
Nakhon Si United	(Thailand) Thongchai Sukkoki	Moved to technical director	21 October 2024	13th	(Thailand) Sarawut Wongmai (Interim)	21 October 2024
Kanchanaburi Power	(Thailand) Ranon Intharatul (Interim)	End of interim spell	5 November 2024	13th	(Thailand) Dusit Chalermsan	5 November 2024
Chonburi	(Thailand) Pipob On-Mo	Sacked	25 November 2024	4th	(Thailand) Sinthaweechai Hathairattanakool (Interim)	26 November 2024
Police Tero	(Thailand) Thawatchai Damrong-Ongtrakul	Sacked	26 November 2024	16th	(Thailand) Jatuporn Pramualban (Interim)	27 November 2024
Police Tero	(Thailand) Jatuporn Pramualban (Interim)	End of interim spell	15 December 2024	14th	(Sweden) Kaveh Magnusson	15 December 2024
Samut Prakan City	(Thailand) Vantawut Whangprasert	Resigned	22 December 2024	17th		
Chanthaburi	(Thailand) Supachai Komsilp	Sacked	22 December 2024	12th	(Brazil) Leonardo Neiva	2 January 2025
Chonburi	(Thailand) Sinthaweechai Hathairattanakool (Interim)	End of interim spell	28 December 2024	8th	(Thailand) Thawatchai Damrong-Ongtrakul	28 December 2024
Police Tero	(Sweden) Kaveh Magnusson	Resigned	3 January 2025	14th	(Brazil) Jose Alves Borges	10 January 2025
Trat	(Thailand) Somchai Makmool	Resigned	20 January 2025	14th	(Thailand) Phayong Khunnaen	20 January 2025
Chanthaburi	(Brazil) Leonardo Neiva	Sacked	4 February 2025	13th	(Brazil) Victor Amaro (Interim)	5 February 2025
Chanthaburi	(Brazil) Victor Amaro (Interim)	End of Interim spell	19 February 2025	13th	(Thailand) Theerawekin Seehawong	19 February 2025
Sisaket	(Thailand) Pipob On-Mo	Sacked	16 April 2025	11th	(Thailand) Suriyant Chaemchaeng (Interim)	26 April 2025

== League table ==
=== Standings ===
Pos	Team	Pld	W	D	L	GF	GA	GD	Pts	Qualification or relegation
1	Chonburi (C, P)	32	19	6	7	56	30	+26	63	Promotion to 2025–26 Thai League 1
2	Ayutthaya United (P)	32	17	9	6	57	30	+27	60	Promotion to 2025–26 Thai League 1
3	Phrae United	32	17	7	8	61	38	+23	58	Qualification for promotion play-offs
4	Kanchanaburi Power (O, P)	32	13	13	6	53	36	+17	52	Qualification for promotion play-offs
5	Mahasarakham SBT	32	13	9	10	44	39	+5	48 (Note: Mahasarakham SBT ahead on head-to-head points record; Mahasarakham SBT 4 pts, Lampang 1 pt.)	Qualification for promotion play-offs
6	Lampang (D)	32	13	9	10	48	39	+9	48	Dissolved after season (Note: Lampang dissolved after the conclusion of the season, despite having qualified for the promotion play-offs, and will not participate in the 2025–26 Thai League 2.)
7	Kasetsart	32	11	12	9	36	37	−1	45 (Note: Kasetsart ahead on head-to-head points record; Kasetsart 6 pts, Bangkok 0 pts.)	
8	Bangkok	32	13	6	13	42	50	−8	45	
9	Nakhon Si United	32	13	5	14	51	52	−1	44	
10	Sisaket United	32	10	11	11	29	39	−10	41	
11	Police Tero	32	11	7	14	39	48	−9	40 (Note: Police Tero ahead on head-to-head points record; Police Tero 3 pts (GD +2), Chiangmai United 3 pts (GD -2).)	
12	Chiangmai United	32	10	10	12	41	48	−7	40	
13	Chanthaburi	32	10	8	14	37	48	−11	38	
14	Chainat Hornbill	32	8	11	13	32	34	−2	35	
15	Trat	32	9	6	17	36	49	−13	33	
16	Pattaya United (Note: Pattaya United retained their Thai League 2 status after Lampang withdrew from the competition for the following season.)	32	8	8	16	32	47	−15	32	
17	Suphanburi (R)	32	5	7	20	42	72	−30	22	Relegation to 2025–26 Thai League 3
18	Samut Prakan City (D)	0	0	0	0	0	0	0	0	Dissolved (results expunged) (Note: Samut Prakan City dissolved during the season, and all matches involving the club were subsequently expunged from the official league records.)

Source: Thai League
Rules for classification: 1) Points; 2) Head-to-head points; 3) Head-to-head goal difference; 4) Head-to-head goal scored; 5) Overall goal difference; 6) Overall goal scored; 7) Fair play points; 8) Play-off without extra time).
(C) Champions; (D) Disqualified; (O) Play-off winners; (P) Promoted; (R) Relegated

=== Positions by round ===
The table lists the positions of teams after each week of matches. In order to preserve chronological evolvements, any postponed matches are not included in the round at which they were originally scheduled, but added to the full round they were played immediately afterwards. For example, if a match is scheduled for matchday 13, but then postponed and played between days 16 and 17, it will be added to the standings for day 16.

Team ╲ Round	1	2	3	4	5	6	7	8	9	10	11	12	13	14	15	16	17	18	19	20	21	22	23	24	25	26	27	28	29	30	31	32
Chonburi	1	1	1	1	1	1	2	3	2	2	2	4	4	4	4	5	5	4	5	3	3	3	3	3	3	3	3	3	3	1	1	1
Ayutthaya United	14	7	12	8	7	7	6	4	4	4	3	2	2	3	2	2	2	2	2	2	2	2	2	2	2	2	1	1	1	3	3	2
Phrae United	8	4	3	2	2	2	1	1	1	1	1	1	1	1	1	1	1	1	1	1	1	1	1	1	1	1	2	2	2	2	2	3
Kanchanaburi Power	10	16	14	14	14	11	11	15	9	7	7	7	7	6	8	6	9	10	7	8	7	6	6	4	4	6	4	4	4	4	4	4
Mahasarakham	2	10	5	6	3	4	3	2	3	3	4	3	3	2	3	4	4	5	4	5	5	7	7	6	6	4	5	5	5	6	5	5
Lampang	12	13	8	3	6	12	12	9	10	10	12	10	8	7	7	10	8	8	6	6	6	4	5	5	7	5	6	7	7	5	6	6
Kasetsart	11	6	11	11	11	6	5	5	5	6	6	5	5	8	6	8	6	6	8	7	8	8	8	10	8	9	8	8	6	7	7	7
Bangkok	3	2	6	10	12	15	13	11	6	5	5	6	6	5	5	3	3	3	3	4	4	5	4	7	5	7	7	6	8	8	8	8
Nakhon Si United	13	15	9	4	4	10	8	8	13	11	15	15	13	13	11	13	11	11	11	11	12	12	12	9	10	10	10	10	10	9	9	9
Sisaket United	9	3	2	7	5	3	4	6	8	9	10	9	10	10	9	7	8	9	10	9	9	9	9	8	9	8	9	9	9	10	11	10
Police Tero	15	8	10	12	9	9	7	7	11	13	13	13	15	16	16	14	14	16	14	15	14	15	15	14	14	14	14	12	11	13	12	11
Chiangmai United	6	14	17	16	17	17	15	13	7	8	9	8	9	9	10	9	7	7	9	10	10	11	10	11	11	11	11	11	12	11	10	12
Chanthaburi	16	17	16	17	15	16	17	17	15	15	14	14	12	12	15	12	12	12	12	12	13	13	13	15	13	13	13	13	14	12	13	13
Chainat Hornbill	4	5	7	9	8	8	10	12	16	17	17	16	16	15	14	11	13	15	16	16	16	16	16	16	16	16	16	16	15	15	14	14
Trat	5	9	4	5	10	5	9	10	12	14	11	12	11	11	12	15	15	13	13	14	15	14	14	13	15	15	15	15	16	16	15	15
Pattaya United	7	12	15	15	16	13	14	16	14	12	8	11	14	14	13	16	16	14	15	13	11	10	11	12	12	12	12	14	13	14	16	16
Suphanburi	18	18	18	18	18	18	18	18	18	18	18	18	18	18	18	18	18	18	18	18	17	17	17	17	17	17	17	17	17	17	17	17
Samut Prakan City	17	11	13	13	13	14	16	14	17	16	16	17	17	17	17	17	17	17	17	17	18	18	18	18	18	18	18	18	18	18	18	18

Leader and qualification to the 2025–26 Thai League
Promotion to the 2025–26 Thai League
Play off to the 2025–26 Thai League
Relegation to the 2025–26 Thai League 3

Source: Thai League 2

=== Results by match played ===
Team ╲ Round	1	2	3	4	5	6	7	8	9	10	11	12	13	14	15	16	17	18	19	20	21	22	23	24	25	26	27	28	29	30	31	32	33	34
Ayutthaya United	L	W	L	W	D	D	W	W	D	D	W	N	W	L	W	W	D	W	W	D	W	D	W	L	W	W	D	N	W	L	L	W	D	W
Bangkok	W	W	L	L	L	L	D	W	W	W	W	D	L	W	W	N	W	W	L	L	D	L	W	L	L	W	D	L	D	L	D	N	W	L
Chainat Hornbill	W	D	D	N	D	D	D	L	L	L	D	D	L	W	D	W	L	L	L	N	L	D	L	W	L	D	L	L	W	W	W	D	W	L
Chanthaburi	L	L	D	L	W	L	L	W	N	D	D	L	W	L	L	W	W	W	L	D	D	L	L	L	N	W	L	W	D	D	W	W	L	D
Chiangmai United	D	L	L	L	D	D	W	W	W	D	D	W	D	N	L	W	W	L	L	L	D	D	W	L	L	L	W	D	L	N	W	W	L	D
Chonburi	W	W	N	W	W	D	L	L	W	D	L	D	L	W	W	L	W	W	N	W	D	D	D	W	L	W	W	W	W	W	W	L	W	W
Kanchanaburi Power	D	L	D	D	D	W	D	L	W	W	N	W	D	W	L	W	L	L	L	D	D	W	D	W	W	D	N	W	W	W	D	L	D	D
Kasetsart	D	W	L	D	D	W	N	D	D	D	W	W	L	D	W	L	W	L	L	W	D	W	N	D	L	W	L	W	D	W	L	D	D	L
Lampang	D	L	W	W	L	L	L	W	D	D	D	W	N	W	D	L	L	W	W	W	D	W	D	L	W	L	W	L	N	D	W	L	W	D
Mahasarakham	N	L	W	D	W	L	W	W	L	W	L	W	W	W	L	L	W	L	W	L	D	L	D	D	W	D	W	L	D	D	D	W	D	N
Nakhon Si United	D	L	W	W	N	L	W	L	L	D	L	L	W	L	W	L	W	W	L	D	N	L	W	W	W	L	D	W	L	L	D	W	L	W
Pattaya United	D	D	L	D	L	W	L	D	W	N	W	L	L	L	D	L	L	W	D	W	W	W	L	D	L	N	D	L	L	W	L	L	L	L
Phrae United	D	W	W	W	W	W	W	W	W	W	L	L	W	W	N	L	D	L	W	L	W	W	D	L	W	L	D	L	W	D	N	W	D	D
Police Tero	L	W	D	L	W	N	W	L	L	L	D	D	D	L	L	W	L	L	W	D	L	N	L	W	L	W	L	W	W	D	L	W	D	W
Samut Prakan City	N	N	N	N	N	N	N	N	N	N	N	N	N	N	N	N	N	N	N	N	N	N	N	N	N	N	N	N	N	N	N	N	N	N
Sisaket United	D	W	W	L	D	W	D	L	L	D	D	W	D	D	W	W	N	L	L	W	D	L	D	D	W	L	W	D	L	L	L	L	N	W
Suphanburi	L	L	L	D	L	L	L	N	L	L	L	L	L	L	D	W	L	W	W	L	D	L	W	N	W	D	D	D	L	D	L	L	L	L
Trat	W	N	W	D	L	W	L	L	D	L	W	L	W	L	L	L	L	N	D	D	L	W	L	W	L	L	L	D	L	L	W	L	W	W

Source: Thai League
N = No match; W = Win; D = Draw; L = Lose

== Promotion play-offs ==
=== Bracket ===
Semi-finals
5	Mahasarakham	3	1	4
4	Kanchanaburi Power	3	4	7
6	Lampang	2	0	2
3	Phrae United	2	5	7

Finals
Kanchanaburi Power	3	2	5
Phrae United	2	2	4

=== Semi-finals ===
3 May 2025
18:00 UTC+7

Lampang	2–2	Phrae United
Taiga Matsunaga 10', 23'		Tatsuhide Shimizu 16'; Athit Promkhun 27'

Lampang Province Stadium, Lampang
Attendance: 1,579
Referee: Satchukorn Saenchu (Thailand)
10 May 2025
18:00 UTC+7

Phrae United	5–0	Lampang
Welington Smith 1', 84'; Settawut Wongsai 73'; Matheus Souza 82'; Ekkalarp Hanpanichkij 87'

Huai Ma Stadium, Phrae
Attendance: 1,873
Referee: Kanoksak Khiaodaeng (Thailand)

Phrae United won 7–2 on aggregate.

4 May 2025
18:00 UTC+7

Mahasarakham	3–3	Kanchanaburi Power
Kim Joo-chan 14', 17'; Jardel Capistrano 74'		Chenrop Samphaodi 42', 90+5'; Mohamed Mara 88' (pen.)

Mahasarakham Province Stadium, Maha Sarakham
Attendance: 2,688
Referee: Sila Jinnigorn (Thailand)
11 May 2025
18:00 UTC+7

Kanchanaburi Power	4–1	Mahasarakham
Pongpat Liorungrueangkit 18'; Mohamed Mara 51' (pen.)		Jardel Capistrano 32' (pen.)

Kleeb Bua Stadium, Kanchanaburi
Attendance: 4,569
Referee: Direk Kaort (Thailand)

Kanchanaburi Power won 7–4 on aggregate.

=== Finals ===
17 May 2025
18:00 UTC+7

Kanchanaburi Power	3–2	Phrae United
Kritsana Kasemkulvilai 17'; Amarildo 69'; Chenrop Samphaodi 85'		Waradorn Unard 39'; Laphonwich Sutthasen 48'

Kleeb Bua Stadium, Kanchanaburi
Attendance: 11,096
Referee: Winat Phophat (Thailand)
24 May 2025
18:00 UTC+7

Phrae United	2–2	Kanchanaburi Power
Waradorn Unard 13'; Welington Smith 21'		Mohamed Mara 1'; Pongpat Liorungrueangkit 53'

Huai Ma Stadium, Phrae
Attendance: 2,500
Referee: Torphong Somsing (Thailand)

Kanchanaburi Power won 5–4 on aggregate.

== Results ==
Home \ Away	AYU	BAN	CHB	CTB	CMU	CHO	DPK	KAS	LAM	MSK	NSU	PAT	PRU	PTR	SPC	SKU	SPB	TRA
Ayutthaya United		5–1	2–1	2–0	3–1	1–1	1–2	2–1	2–0	2–0	2–2	5–0	0–0	2–1		2–0	2–2	2–0
Bangkok	2–1		1–0	1–1	2–1	2–1	1–1	1–2	0–2	2–2	1–1	1–0	0–1	0–0		1–3	3–2	1–0
Chainat Hornbill	1–1	1–1		5–2	0–0	1–3	2–2	3–0	2–1	0–0	1–0	0–2	0–1	2–1		1–1	2–1	2–0
Chanthaburi	1–2	1–0	1–0		1–1	1–0	1–2	1–2	3–1	1–0	0–3	0–1	2–2	1–2		1–0	3–1	2–2
Chiangmai United	1–0	1–2	0–0	3–1		1–2	0–3	1–1	2–1	0–1	4–5	2–1	1–1	2–1		1–1	2–2	1–0
Chonburi	2–2	2–0	1–1	1–2	5–2		2–1	2–1	2–1	2–0	2–1	2–0	0–1	4–2		5–0	4–0	1–0
Kanchanaburi Power	3–0	2–3	1–0	0–1	2–2	0–1		1–1	0–0	2–3	5–0	1–0	2–3	2–1		0–0	1–0	0–0
Kasetsart	0–0	1–0	0–0	1–2	2–0	2–1	3–3		0–2	0–2	0–0	0–0	2–1	1–1		1–0	1–0	2–0
Lampang	3–4	3–0	2–1	0–0	1–0	1–1	0–0	2–0		2–2	3–1	2–1	3–4	3–1		0–1	3–1	2–0
Mahasarakham	1–2	3–2	1–0	1–0	3–1	2–0	2–2	1–1	4–2		0–0	1–2	1–4	2–1		2–0	2–3	3–2
Nakhon Si United	1–5	1–2	0–1	1–1	1–3	3–2	0–2	2–1	2–1	1–0		3–2	4–1	4–0		3–1	2–0	6–1
Pattaya United	0–3	1–0	1–1	1–0	0–3	0–1	1–2	3–3	0–0	1–1	0–1		2–1	1–0		0–1	0–3	1–1
Phrae United	0–0	4–0	1–0	6–2	1–1	0–0	3–4	1–2	1–2	1–0	3–0	2–2		4–2		1–0	6–1	2–0
Police Tero	0–0	2–1	2–1	1–1	3–0	0–2	1–2	0–1	2–2	1–1	2–1	2–1	2–1			0–0	1–0	1–0
Samut Prakan City																		
Sisaket United	2–1	2–3	2–1	2–1	1–1	1–1	1–1	0–0	0–1	0–0	2–1	1–1	2–0	0–2			2–0	1–0
Suphanburi	0–1	1–4	2–2	3–3	0–1	0–1	3–3	3–3	1–1	0–2	2–1	0–6	0–1	3–0		6–1		1–2
Trat	1–0	2–4	1–0	1–0	1–2	1–2	0–0	2–1	1–1	2–1	2–0	3–1	1–3	3–4		1–1	6–1	

Updated to match(es) played on 26 April 2024. Source: Thai League
Legend: Blue = home team win; Yellow = draw; Red = away team win.

Note: The match between Chanthaburi and Nakhon Si United on 31 August 2024 was awarded as a 0–3 win to Nakhon Si United due to inadequate stadium lighting, which led to the match being abandoned after multiple stoppages.

== Season statistics ==
=== Top scorers ===
As of 24 May 2025.

Rank	Player	Club	Goals
1	(Brazil) Wellington Adão	Phrae United	23
2	(Brazil) Caíque	Ayutthaya United	21
3	(Brazil) Rodrigo Maranhão	Nakhon Si United	19
4	(Thailand) Adisak Kraisorn	Kasetsart (11 Goals); Chonburi (6 Goals)	17
5	(Brazil) Tiago Chulapa	Chanthaburi	15
5	(Brazil) Danilo	Sisaket United	15
7	(Brazil) Derley	Chonburi	14
7	(Brazil) Caio Rodrigues	Lampang	14
7	(Netherlands) Oege Van Lingen	Suphanburi	14
10	(Thailand) Thanayut Jittabud	Chainat Hornbill	12
10	(Brazil) Leandro Assumpção	Mahasarakham	12
10	(Thailand) Settawut Wongsai	Phrae United	12

=== Hat-tricks ===
Player	For	Against	Result	Date
(Brazil) Wellington Adão	Phrae United	Police Tero	4–2 (H)	27 October 2024
(Thailand) Settawut Wongsai	Phrae United	Chanthaburi	6–2 (H)	29 November 2024
(Brazil) Rodrigo Maranhão^{5}	Nakhon Si United	Trat	6–1 (H)	22 December 2024
(Netherlands) Oege-Sietse van Lingen^{4}	Suphanburi	Sisaket United	6–1 (H)	5 January 2025
(Brazil) Caíque	Ayutthaya United	Nakhon Si United	5–1 (A)	22 February 2025
(Thailand) Witchaya Pornprasart	Bangkok	Trat	4–2 (A)	23 February 2025
(Palestine) Yashir Islame	Ayutthaya United	Pattaya United	5–0 (H)	16 March 2025
(Thailand) Thanayut Jittabud	Chainat Hornbill	Chanthaburi	5–2 (H)	19 April 2025

=== Clean sheets ===
As of 26 April 2025.

Rank	Player	Club	Clean sheets
1	(Thailand) Suppawat Srinothai	Phrae United	14
2	(Thailand) Phuwadol Pholsongkram	Ayutthaya United	13
3	(Thailand) Noppakun Kadtoon	Chonburi	12
4	(Thailand) Adisak Lambelsah	Sisaket United	10
5	(Thailand) Prasit Padungchok	Chanthaburi / Kanchanaburi Power	9
5	(Thailand) Thirawut Sraunson	Kasetsart	9
7	(Thailand) Kiadtisak Chaodon	Chainat Hornbill	8
8	(Thailand) Kittisak Moosawat	Lampang	7
9	(Thailand) Pairot Eiammak	Chiangmai United	6
9	(Thailand) Anipong Kijkam	Police Tero	6
9	(Thailand) Todsaporn Sri-reung	Trat	6

== Awards ==
=== Monthly awards ===
Month	Coach of the Month		Player of the Month		Goal of the month		Fair play of the month	Reference
Month	Coach	Club	Player	Club	Player	Club	Club	Reference
August	(Thailand) Pipob On-Mo	Chonburi	(Brazil) Welington Smith	Phrae United	(Thailand) Yotsakorn Burapha	Chonburi	Chonburi	
September	(Thailand) Thongchai Rungreangles	Phrae United	(Thailand) Adisak Kraisorn	Kasetsart	(Brazil) Welington Smith	Phrae United	Chainat Hornbill, Kasetsart	
October	(Thailand) Kissakorn Krasaingoen	Bangkok	(Thailand) Wichaya Pornprasart	Bangkok	(Brazil) Patrick Cruz	Pattaya United	Chonburi, Samut Prakan City, Suphanburi	
November	(Thailand) Jakarat Tonhongsa	Mahasarakham	(Brazil) Caíque	Ayutthaya United	(Brazil) Welington Smith	Phrae United	Chiangmai United	
December	(Thailand) Jugkrit Siriwattanasart	Ayutthaya United	(Thailand) Sitthinan Rungrueang	Suphanburi	(Thailand) Pongpat Liorungrueangkit	Kanchanaburi Power	Police Tero	
January	(Thailand) Wittaya Dongyai	Lampang	(Netherlands) Oege-Sietse van Lingen	Suphanburi	(Thailand) Settawut Wongsai	Phrae United	Lampang	
February	(Thailand) Dusit Chalermsan	Kanchanaburi Power	(Thailand) Chisanupong Phimpsang	Suphanburi	(Brazil) Danilo	Sisaket United	Trat	
March	(Thailand) Thawatchai Damrong-Ongtrakul	Chonburi	(Thailand) Kritsana Kasemkulvilai	Kanchanaburi Power	(Thailand) Siwarut Pholhirun	Nakhon Si United	Chonburi, Ayutthaya United	
April								

== See also ==
- 2024–25 Thai League 1
- 2024–25 Thai League 3
- 2025 Thailand Amateur League
- 2024–25 Thai FA Cup
- 2024–25 Thai League Cup
