= Muang Thai Chiang Mai Marathon =

Race in Chiang Mai, Thailand

- Date: December
- Location: Chiang Mai, Thailand
- Event type: Road
- Distance: Marathon, Half marathon, 10 km
- Course records: Men: 2:27:34 (2016) (United Kingdom) Lee Grantham; Women: 3:06:52 (2018) (Kenya) Dorcas Jebotip Tarus
- Website: Muang Thai Chiang Mai Marathon
- Participants: 6,200 (2017)

The Muang Thai Chiang Mai Marathon is held every late December in Chiang Mai, Thailand. It is the largest annual road racing event held in Chiang Mai. Its title sponsor is Muang Thai Life Assurance. It was first founded by Mercy School alumni.

In 2017, there were more than 6,000 participants.

== Past winners ==
Key: Course record

=== Marathon ===
Year	Men's winner	Time (h:m:s)	Women's winner	Time (h:m:s)
2016	Lee Grantham (GBR)	2:27:34	Phitchanan Mahachot (THA)	3:11:59
2017	Julius Kiptum Mutai (KEN)	2:37:18	Chothip Kanuam (THA)	3:17:02
2018	Harry Jones (GBR)	2:34:41	Dorcas Jebotip Tarus (KEN)	3:06:52
