= Kim Juchan =

South Korean professional footballer (born 2001)

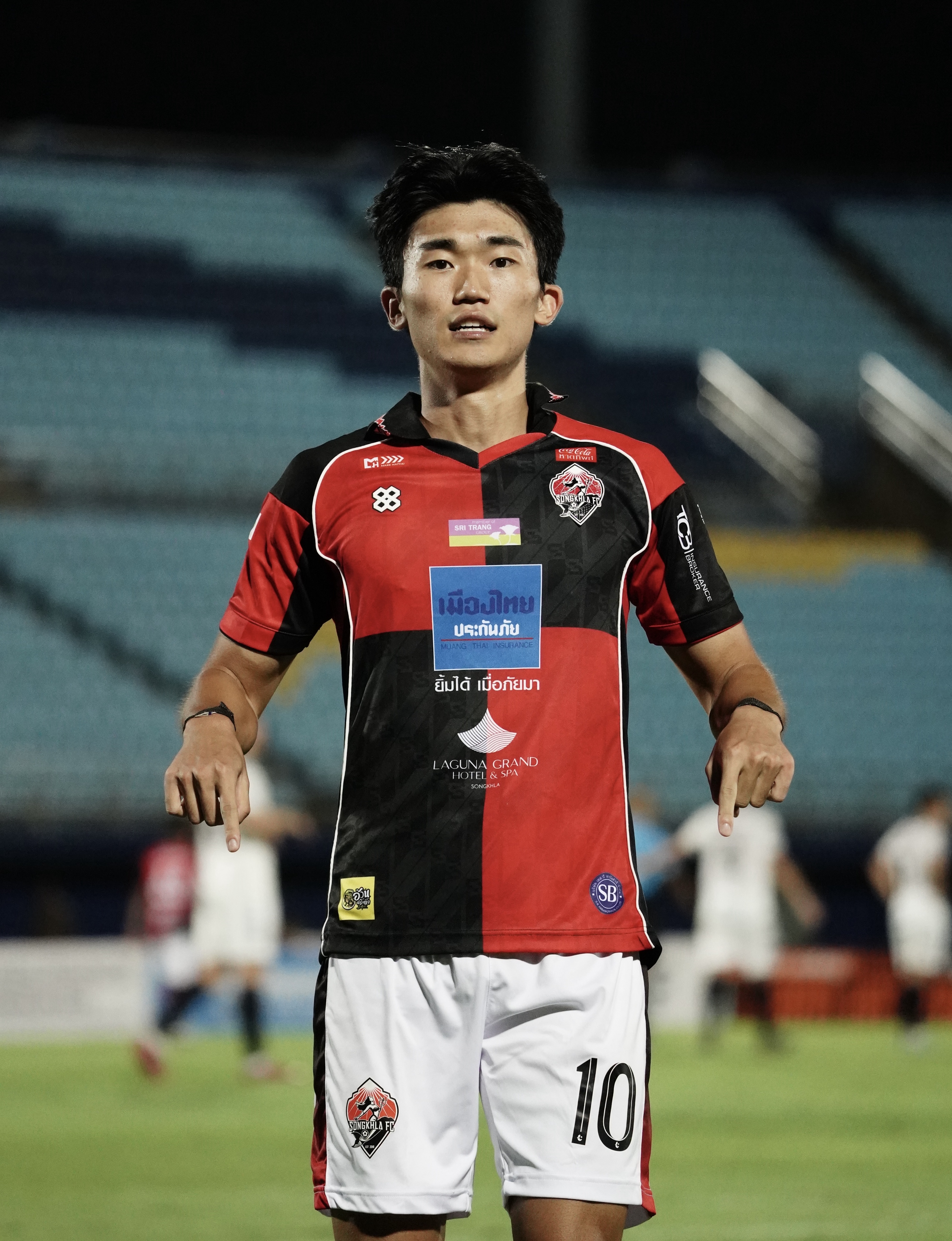

Personal information
- Full name: Kim Juchan (김주찬)
- Date of birth: 24 September 2001 (age 25)
- Place of birth: Incheon, South Korea
- Height: 1.78 m (5 ft 10 in)
- Positions: Winger; forward

Team information
- Current team: Songkhla F.C.
- Number: 10

Youth career
- 2012: Ansan Bugok Youth F.C.
- 2013: Incheon United U12
- 2014–2016: Bucheon F.C. 1995 U15
- 2017–2019: Bucheon F.C. 1995 U18
- 2020–2021: Yeoju University

Senior career*
Years	Team	Apps	(Gls)
2022	Pyeongtaek C.	28	(2)
2023	Pyeongtaek C.	25	(5)
2023–2024	Lampang F.C.	17	(7)
2024–2025	Mahasarakham SBT F.C.	35	(10)
2025–2026	Songkhla F.C.	18	(4)
- * Club domestic league appearances and goals

Kim Juchan (Thai: คิม จูชาน, Korean: 김주찬; born 24 September 2001) is a South Korean professional footballer who played as a winger for Thai League 2 club Songkhla F.C..

== Club career ==
Lampang F.C.

During the second leg of the 2023–24 Thai League 2, Kim joined Lampang F.C., marking a significant phase in his professional journey. He immediately secured a spot in the starting lineup, making 17 appearances—all as a starter. Throughout his time with the club, Kim showcased his attacking prowess by netting 7 goals and contributing 2 assists, leaving a strong impression in a short span with the team.

Mahasarakham SBT F.C.

In June 2024, Kim embarked on a new chapter in his career by signing a one-year contract with Mahasarakham SBT F.C. for the 2024–25 Thai League 2 season. It would prove to be a breakthrough year for the forward, who quickly established himself as a key figure in the squad.

Over the course of the league campaign, Kim made 35 appearances, including 23 starts, contributing 10 goals and 5 assists. His standout performances earned him Man of the Match honors on two occasions—first with a clinical brace against Bangkok F.C., and later with a goal and an assist in a commanding display against Trat F.C., both at home.

Kim carried his momentum into the Thai League 2 playoffs, where he played a decisive role in the first round by scoring twice and providing an assist. He also featured in two Thai FA Cup matches, underlining his value across all competitions.

Songkhla F.C.

In 2025, Kim joined Songkhla F.C., competing in the Thai League 2 Season 2025-2026 (BYD Seal League II). So far, he has recorded 4 goals and 2 assists for the club.

== Career statistics ==
=== Club ===
As of match played 23 December 2025.

Club	Season	League			Cup		Continental		Other		Total	
Club	Season	Division	Apps	Goals	Apps	Goals	Apps	Goals	Apps	Goals	Apps	Goals
Pyeongtaek C.	2022	K4 League	28	2	1 (Note: Appearances in the Korea Cup)	0	–		0	0	29	2
Pyeongtaek C.	2023	K4 League	25	5	1	0	–		0	0	26	5
Lampang F.C.	2023–24	Thai League 2	17	7	0	0	–		0	0	17	7
Mahasarakham SBT F.C.	2024–25	Thai League 2	31	8	2 (Note: Appearances in the Thai FA Cup)	0	–		2 (Note: Appearances in the Thai League 2 Playoff)	2	35	10
Songkhla F.C.	2025–26	Thai League 2	17	4	1 (Note: Appearances in the Thailand League Cup 2025/26)	0	–		0	0	18	4
Career total			118	26	5	1	0	0	2	2	125	28
