= Anderson Nascimento =

Brazilian footballer

Anderson
Personal information
- Full name: Anderson do Nascimento Carneiro
- Date of birth: 4 March 1993 (age 33)
- Place of birth: Fortaleza, Brazil
- Height: 1.87 m (6 ft 2 in)
- Position: Centre-back

Team information
- Current team: Sisaket United
- Number: 4

Senior career*
Years	Team	Apps	(Gls)
2014–2015	4 de Julho	3	(0)
2018	Horizonte	7	(0)
2018–2019	CEOV	23	(0)
2018	→ Horizonte (loan)	13	(0)
2019	Boa	5	(1)
2019–2020	Senglea Athletic	11	(0)
2020–2021	Tarxien Rainbows	10	(0)
2021–2022	Doxa Drama	17	(1)
2022	Alki Oroklini	1	(0)
2023–2024	Persik Kediri	42	(5)
2024–2025	Persela Lamongan	10	(1)
2025	→ Barito Putera (loan)	16	(1)
2026–	Sisaket United	0	(0)
- * Club domestic league appearances and goals as of 24 May 2025

Anderson do Nascimento Carneiro (born 4 March 1993) is a Brazilian professional footballer who plays as a centre-back for Thai League 1 club Sisaket United.

== Club career ==
Born in Fortaleza, Brazil, he joined several local Brazilian clubs, and decided to go abroad for the first time to Malta and joined Senglea Athletic in the 2019 season. Then, he decided to leave and join another Maltese club, Tarxien Rainbows. However, Anderson was only half a season with Rainbows. Even so, playing in Malta was the longest of his football career. He has recorded a total of 22 matches with details of 1,945 minutes of play.

=== Doxa Drama ===
In the 2020–2021 season, Anderson moved to Greece and joined Super League Greece 2 side Doxa Drama on free transfer. Anderson made his league debut on 3 February 2021 as a starter in a 1–0 lose over Chania. Anderson scored his first league goal for the club, opening the scoring in a 2–1 win against Ionikos on 17 February 2021. He contributed with 17 league appearances, scored one goal during his 2020–2021 season.

=== Alki Oroklini ===
Ahead of the 2022 season, Anderson signed a contract with Cypriot Second Division club Alki Oroklini. He made his club debut on 22 September 2021, coming on as a starter in a 0–4 home lose against AEK Larnaca in the 2021–22 Cypriot Cup.

=== Persik Kediri ===
On 25 January 2023, Anderson signed a one-year contract with Indonesian club Persik Kediri in the 2022–23 Liga 1. He made his league debut on 30 January 2023, coming on as a starter in a 2–0 away lose against Borneo Samarinda. On 23 February 2023, he picked up his first win with Persik in his fifth appearances in a 5–1 win over RANS Nusantara. Five days later, Anderson provided an assist for Flávio Silva in a 2–3 away win over Arema. On 4 April 2023, Anderson extended his contract with the club for one year. Throughout the season, he was used a first choice centre-back in the club, finishing his new season with 14 league appearance, and two assists.

=== Persela Lamongan ===
On 8 August 2024, Anderson signed a one-year contract with Liga 2 club Persela Lamongan.
