= Somchai Chuayboonchum =

Thai footballer and coach (born 1954)

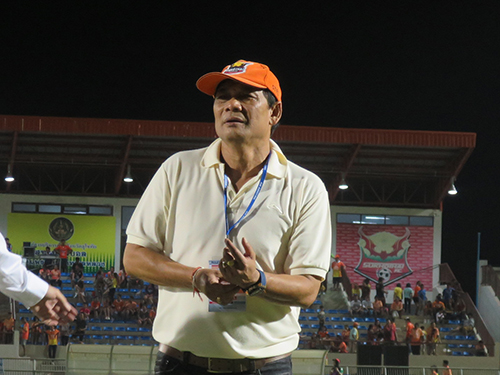

Personal information
- Full name: Somchai Chuayboonchum
- Date of birth: 17 February 1954 (age 72)
- Place of birth: Samut Songkhram, Thailand
- Height: 1.68 m (5 ft 6 in)
- Position: Midfielder

Team information
- Current team: Sisaket United (head coach)

Senior career*
Years	Team	Apps	(Gls)
1976–1983	Port Authority of Thailand	82	(21)

International career
1984–1985	Thailand B	2	(0)

Managerial career
- 2006–2010: Samut Songkhram
- 2011: Chantaburi
- 2011: Thailand U19
- 2012: TTM Chiangmai
- 2012–2014: Samut Songkhram
- 2013: Thailand U19
- 2014: Chiangmai
- 2015: Port
- 2016: Sukhothai
- 2017: Navy
- 2018–2019: Sisaket
- 2020–2021: Nongbua Pitchaya
- 2021–2022: Trat
- 2022–2023: Chiangmai United
- 2023: Sisaket United
- 2023–2024: Navy
- 2025–: Sisaket United
- * Club domestic league appearances and goals as of 3 January 2010

Somchai Chuayboonchum (Thai: สมชาย ชวยบุญชุม) is a Thai football manager and former player.He is currently the head coach of the Thai League 1 club, Sisaket United.

== International career ==
He played as midfielder for Thailand national team.

== Managerial statistics ==
As of match played 8 November 2026

Managerial record by team and tenure
Team	Nat.	From	To	Record					Ref.
Team	Nat.	From	To	G	W	D	L	Win %	Ref.
Thailand U19	(Thailand)	8 September 2011	21 September 2011	6	5	1	0	83.33	
Samut Songkhram	(Thailand)	1 January 2012	1 April 2014	38	6	13	19	15.79	
Port	(Thailand)	1 November 2014	1 April 2015	5	1	0	4	20.00	
Sukhothai	(Thailand)	3 March 2016	26 September 2016	31	13	6	12	41.94	
Navy	(Thailand)	3 November 2016	22 November 2017	36	11	10	15	30.56	
Sisaket	(Thailand)	12 March 2018	18 November 2019	42	24	12	6	57.14	
Nongbua Pitchaya	(Thailand)	18 November 2019	4 May 2021	37	23	12	2	62.16	
Trat	(Thailand)	14 June 2021	31 May 2022	38	21	11	6	55.26	
Chiangmai United	(Thailand)	31 August 2022	8 March 2023	28	13	7	8	46.43	
Sisaket United	(Thailand)	1 July 2025	Present	48	23	14	11	47.92	
Career Total				309	140	86	83	45.31	

== Honours ==
=== Manager ===
Samut Songkhram

- Thai Division 1 League runner-up: 2007

Thailand U-19

- AFF U-19 Youth Championship: 2011

Nongbua Pitchaya

- Thai League 2: 2020–21

Sisaket United

- Thai League 2 runner-up: 2025–26

Individual

- Thai League 1 Coach of the Month: July 2016

== See also ==
- Wikipedia in Thai
