= Denis Darbellay =

Swiss football player (born 1998)

Personal information
- Full name: Denis Paul Kun Darbellay
- Date of birth: 5 June 1998 (age 28)
- Place of birth: Switzerland
- Height: 1.87 m (6 ft 2 in)
- Position: Winger

Team information
- Current team: Kasetsart
- Number: 7

Youth career
- 2013–2014: Monthey
- 2014–2015: FC Sion
- 2016–2018: Monthey

Senior career*
Years	Team	Apps	(Gls)
2018	Monthey	7	(0)
2019–2024	Police Tero	48	(2)
2024–2025	Uthai Thani	14	(1)
2025	Nakhon Ratchasima	13	(0)
2026–	Kasetsart	14	(1)
- * Club domestic league appearances and goals as of 1 April 2026

Denis Darbellay (Thai: เดอนี่ ดาร์เบอเล่ย์; born 5 June 1998) is a professional footballer who plays as a winger for Thai League 1 club Sisaket. Born in Switzerland, he plays for Thailand internationally.

== Career ==
=== Club career ===
Darbellay started his career with Swiss fifth tier side Monthey. Before the 2019 season, he signed for Police Tero in the Thai second tier, helping them earn promotion to the Thai top flight.

=== International career ===
Darbellay is eligible to represent Thailand internationally through his mother.
