= Leonardo Neiva =

Brazilian football coach (born 1977)

Léo Neiva
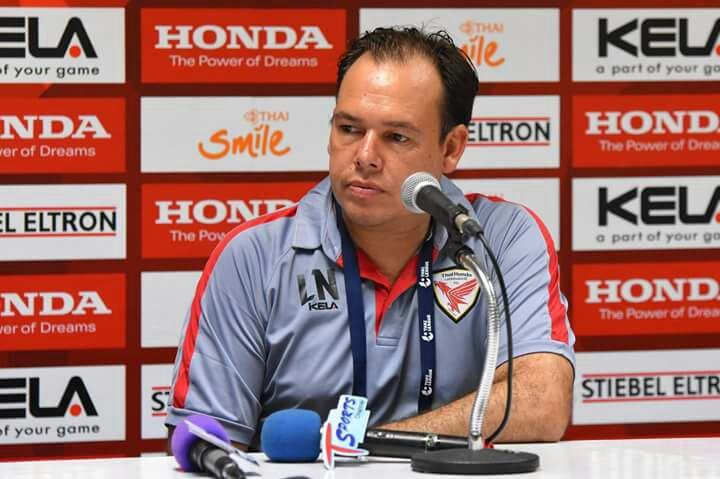

Personal information
- Full name: Leonardo Martins Neiva
- Date of birth: 10 December 1977 (age 48)
- Place of birth: Rio de Janeiro, Brazil

Managerial career
- Years: Team
- 2007: America-RJ (assistant)
- 2008–2009: Platinum Stars (youth)
- 2010: Bonsucesso
- 2010–2011: Yadanarbon (youth)
- 2011–2012: Rakhine United
- 2013: Francana
- 2014–2015: Yanga
- 2015–2016: Montego Bay United
- 2016–2017: Yadanarbon
- 2017: Thai Honda
- 2019–2020: Atlético Itapemirim
- 2021: Saint Kitts and Nevis
- 2021–2022: Al-Merrikh
- 2023: Vipers
- 2024: Gor Mahia
- 2025: Chanthaburi
- 2025–: FC Oliveira do Hospital

Leonardo Martins Neiva (born 10 December 1977 in Rio de Janeiro), commonly known as Léo Neiva, is a Brazilian football coach and former professional player. His coaching career spans across multiple regions, including South America, Africa, Asia, and the Caribbean.
