= Judivan =

Brazilian footballer

Personal information
- Full name: Judivan Flor da Silva
- Date of birth: 21 May 1995 (age 31)
- Place of birth: Sousa, Brazil
- Height: 1.77 m (5 ft 9 1/2 in)
- Position: Forward

Team information
- Current team: Uttaradit

Youth career
- 2010: Olé Brasil
- 2011–2014: Cruzeiro

Senior career*
Years	Team	Apps	(Gls)
2014–2020	Cruzeiro	30	(2)
2018	→ América Mineiro (loan)	9	(0)
2018	→ CSA (loan)	4	(0)
2019	→ Tombense (loan)	17	(5)
2019	→ Paraná (loan)	13	(1)
2020–2021	Botafogo-SP	24	(1)
2021–2022	Gżira United	0	(0)
2021–2022	→ Nadur Youngsters (loan)	17	(13)
2022–2023	Khon Kaen	17	(12)
2023–2024	Pattaya United	30	(14)
2024	Lampang	15	(7)
2025	Nongbua Pitchaya	11	(1)
2025	Sisaket United	4	(0)
2026	Phrae United	13	(3)
2026–	Uttaradit	0	(0)

International career
2015	Brazil U20	4	(2)
- * Club domestic league appearances and goals as of 10 February 2025

Judivan Flor da Silva (born 21 May 1995), simply known as Judivan, is a Brazilian professional footballer who plays as a forward for Thai League 2 club Uttaradit. Judivan has also played for his country at U-20 level and donned the Brazil shirt during the World Cup in 2015, when he played four matches and scored two goals after that his participation was ended due to injury.
