= Teerasak Po-on =

Thai footballer and manager (born 1978)

Personal information
- Full name: Teerasak Po-on
- Date of birth: 18 May 1978 (age 48)
- Place of birth: Chonburi, Thailand
- Height: 1.71 m (5 ft 7 1/2 in)
- Position: Defensive midfielder

Team information
- Current team: Chanthaburi (head coach)

Senior career*
Years	Team	Apps	(Gls)
1996–2001	Thai Farmers Bank	98	(15)
2001–2003	Sembawang Rangers	31	(2)
2004	Krung Thai Bank	25	(3)
2005–2006	Provincial Electricity Authority	55	(7)
2007–2010	Chonburi	52	(4)
2010	→ Chanthaburi (loan)	18	(0)
2011–2014	Chiangrai United	104	(0)
Total		383	(31)

International career
1996–1997	Thailand U17		
1998	Thailand U19		
1999–2000	Thailand U23		

Managerial career
- 2012: Chiangrai United (caretaker)
- 2013: Chiangrai United (player-manager)
- 2014–2016: Chiangrai United
- 2016–2019: PTT Rayong
- 2019–2022: Nakhon Ratchasima
- 2022: PT Prachuap
- 2023–2025: Nakhon Ratchasima
- 2025: Chonburi
- 2025–2026: Khonkaen United
- 2026–: Chanthaburi
- * Club domestic league appearances and goals

Teerasak Po-on (Thai: ธีระศักดิ์ โพธิ์อ้น; born 18 May 1978) is a Thai professional football manager and former player who is the head coach of Thai League 2 club Chanthaburi.

== International career ==
Teerasak played for Thailand at the 1997 FIFA U-17 World Championship in Egypt.

== Managerial career ==
=== Chiangrai United ===
In 2012, it was announced that Teerasak become player-manager of his first club Chiangrai United. In 2014, it was announced that Po-on would be the head coach at Chiangrai United for the next season, after retiring from professional football on the same day. He managed the team until 20 October 2016.

=== PTT Rayong ===
In 2016, Teerasak Po-on was appointed to be the head coach of PTT Rayong. He led the team in 2018 Thai League 2 and led the team back to Thai League 1 again.

=== Return to Nakhon Ratchasima ===
On 5 February 2023, Teerasak returned to Nakhon Ratchasima, agreeing a two-year contract to replace outgoing manager Kevin Blackwell. His first game in charge was a Thai FA Cup match on 8 February 2023 against Suphanburi, ending with a 5–1 victory for Nakhon Ratchasima.

On 21 April 2023, a Thai League 2 match against Nongbua Pitchaya ending with a 3–0 victory for Nakhon Ratchasima. As a result, the team won the Thai League 2 championship in the 2023–24 season, even though the last match was left to play against Chanthaburi because Nakhon Ratchasima had a better Head To Head result than Nongbua Pitchaya and was considered the first champion in 10 years for the team.

=== Chonburi ===
On 9 May 2025, Teerasak Po-on was appointed manager of Thai League 1 club Chonburi replacing Thawatchai Damrong-Ongtrakul. On 19 October 2025, Teerasak resigned from Chonburi after he won none of his 8 games in charge, drawing 5 and losing 3.

=== Khonkaen United ===
On 15 November 2025, Khonkaen United confirmed the appointment of Teerasak Po-on as head coach.

=== Chanthaburi ===
On 11 June 2026, Thai League 2 club Chanthaburi appointed Teerasak Po-on as new head coach, replacing outgoing manager Thongchai Rungreangles.

== Managerial statistics ==
As of match played 20 November 2026

Managerial record by team and tenure
Team	From	To	Record				
Team	From	To	P	W	D	L	Win %
Chiangrai United	23 November 2013	20 October 2016	120	49	31	40	40.8
PTT Rayong	2 November 2016	27 October 2019	102	45	22	35	44.1
Nakhon Ratchasima	27 October 2019	8 March 2022	60	22	16	22	36.7
PT Prachuap	15 June 2022	11 November 2022	14	4	2	8	28.6
Nakhon Ratchasima	5 February 2023	27 April 2025	84	35	25	24	41.7
Chonburi	9 May 2025	19 October 2025	8	0	5	3	0.0
Khon Kaen United	15 November 2025	28 April 2026	29	10	10	9	34.5
Chanthaburi	11 June 2026	Present	13	4	4	5	30.8
Total			430	169	115	146	39.3

== Honours ==
=== Player ===
Krung Thai Bank

- Thai Premier League: 2003–04

Chonburi

- Thai Premier League: 2007
- Kor Royal Cup: 2008, 2009

Thailand

- AFC U-17 Championship runners-up: 1996

=== Manager ===
PTT Rayong

- Thai League 2: 2018

Nakhon Ratchasima

- Thai League 2: 2023–24

Individual

- Thai League 1 Coach of the Month: March 2016, March 2023
- Thai League 2 Coach of the Year: 2023–24
