= Sisaket United F.C. =

Thai football club

Sisaket United ศรีสะเกษ ยูไนเต็ด
- Full name: Sisaket United Football Club สโมสรฟุตบอลศรีสะเกษ ยูไนเต็ด
- Nicknames: The Lamduans (ลำดวนเพลิง)
- Founded: 2012; 14 years ago
- Ground: Sri Nakhon Lamduan Stadium; Sisaket, Thailand
- Capacity: 9,500
- Chairman: Narongsit Khruerarat
- Head Coach: Somchai Chuayboonchum
- League: Thai League 1
- 2025–26: Thai League 2, 2nd of 18 (promoted)
- Website: sisaket-united-fc.com

Sisaket United Football Club (Thai: สโมสรฟุตบอลศรีสะเกษ ยูไนเต็ด) is a Thai semi professional football club based in Sisaket province and club plays in the Thai League 1, the top tier of Thai football from 2026–27 after promotion from Thai League 2 in 2025–26.

== History ==
The club was founded as Sisaket United Football Club in 2012. They entered and played Regional League Division 2 (North Eastern Region). Purpose of the establishment of this club is to want the people of Sisaket and youth to become interested in sports and to push the youth in the province to develop their football skills at the national level.

- In 2020 and 2021, Requested for Postponement the team to rest Due to the COVID-19 pandemic in Thailand and budget issues.
- In 2021 and 2022, The club returned to send the team again in the 2021–22 Thai League 3 Northeastern Region

In 2022, Sisaket United competed in the Thai League 3 for the 2022–23 season. It is their 10th season in the professional league. The club started the season with a 1–2 home defeat to Khon Kaen Mordindang and they ended the season with a 3–1 away win over Khon Kaen Mordindang. The club has finished 2nd place in the league of the Northeastern region and advanced to the national championship stage. In addition, in the 2022–23 Thai FA Cup Sisaket United was penalty shoot-out defeated 5–6 by Police Tero in the fourth round, causing them to be eliminated and in the 2022–23 Thai League Cup Sisaket United was defeated 0–2 by Muangthong United in the first round, causing them to be eliminated too.

=== Promotion ===
In 2023, Sisaket United competed in the Thai League 3 for the 2023–24 season. It is their 11th season in the professional league. The club has finished 1st place in the league of the Northeastern region and advanced to the national championship stage Thai League 3 to the 2024–25 Thai League 2.

On 25 April 2026, Sisaket United secured promotion to Thai League 1 for the first time in their history for the 2026-2027 season after defeating Songkhla 5–1.

== Stadium and locations ==
Coordinates	Location	Stadium	Capacity	Year
15°06′02″N 104°20′27″E	Sisaket	Sri Nakhon Lamduan Stadium	9,500	2012–present

== Season by season record ==
Season	League									FA Cup	League Cup	T3 Cup	Top scorer	
Season	Division	P	W	D	L	F	A	Pts	Pos	FA Cup	League Cup	T3 Cup	Name	Goals
2012	Northeast	30	18	5	7	60	33	59	2nd	Opted out	Opted out			
2013	Northeast	30	12	7	11	49	32	43	9th	Opted out	Opted out			
2014	Northeast	26	8	7	11	38	35	31	11th	Opted out	Opted out			
2015	Northeast	34	13	8	13	45	41	47	9th	Opted out	Opted out			
2016	Northeast	26	8	9	9	35	36	33	10th	Opted out	R1			
2017	T4 Northeast	33	21	6	6	59	31	69	1st	Opted out	Opted out		(Thailand) Chatri Rattanawong	23
2018	T4 Northeast	26	10	10	6	29	23	40	4th	Opted out	Opted out		(Thailand) Suriyan Ckankam	5
2019	T4 Northeast	24	11	5	8	31	33	38	3rd	Opted out	Opted out		(Thailand) Phattharapong Phengchaem	4
2020–21	T3 Northeast	Request for Postponement								Opted out	QR1		—N/a	—N/a
2021–22	T3 Northeast	24	11	7	6	50	30	40	5th	Opted out	QR1		(Thailand) Thongchai Rathchai	13
2022–23	T3 Northeast	24	15	6	3	34	11	51	2nd	R4	R1		(Brazil) Cristian Alex	11
2023–24	T3 Northeast	24	16	8	0	42	7	56	1st	R2	QR1	R2	(Brazil) Danilo	22
2024–25	T2	32	10	11	11	29	39	41	10th	R1	R1		(Brazil) Danilo	15
2025–26	T2	34	16	12	6	49	31	60	2nd	R3	QPR		(Brazil) Fellipe Veloso	14
2026–27	T1													

Champions	Runners-up	Third Place	Promoted	Relegated

- P = Played
- W = Games won
- D = Games drawn
- L = Games lost
- F = Goals for
- A = Goals against
- Pts = Points
- Pos = Final position
- QR1 = First Qualifying Round
- QR2 = Second Qualifying Round
- R1 = Round 1
- R2 = Round 2
- R3 = Round 3
- R4 = Round 4
- R5 = Round 5
- R6 = Round 6
- QF = Quarter-finals
- SF = Semi-finals
- RU = Runners-up
- W = Winners

== Players ==
=== First team squad ===
Note: Flags indicate national team as defined under FIFA eligibility rules; some limited exceptions apply. Players may hold more than one non-FIFA nationality.

No.	Pos.	Nation	Player
2	MF	THA	Denis Darbellay
3	DF	BRA	Guilherme Borech
5	DF	THA	Pakornkiat Kaena
6	DF	BRA	Anderson Nascimento
7	FW	CMR	Alex Mermoz
8	MF	JPN	Hikaru Matsui
9	FW	BRA	Jefesson Vieira Eufrazio
10	FW	BRA	Deyvison Fernandes
11	MF	THA	Phattharpong Phengchaem
19	FW	THA	Kittipong Wongma (Captain)
20	FW	BRA	Patrick Valverde
22	DF	THA	Pongsakron Hanrattana (on loan from Buriram United)
23	MF	THA	Narongrit Kamnet
27	GK	THA	Phiyawat Intarapim

No.	Pos.	Nation	Player
35	DF	GHA	Isaac Honny
37	MF	THA	Suphaphon Sutthisak
39	DF	THA	Anusak Jaiphet
44	GK	THA	Natthasan Pakkarano
45	DF	THA	Chutikom Klinchampasri
55	MF	THA	Kritidet Nanthawong
67	DF	THA	Arthit Buangam
70	GK	THA	Sorasak Khampanja
77	GK	NED	Steven van Dijk
88	DF	THA	Sakkarawit Nimma
92	DF	THA	Thanison Paiboonkitjaroen (on loan from Buriram United)
93	FW	MLI	Mahamadou Doucouré
97	MF	THA	Suttichai Pongson
99	FW	THA	Sittichok Kannoo

=== Out on loan ===
Note: Flags indicate national team as defined under FIFA eligibility rules; some limited exceptions apply. Players may hold more than one non-FIFA nationality.

No.	Pos.	Nation	Player
17	FW	THA	Wongsakorn Saenruecha (at (Thailand) Police Tero)
18	GK	THA	Adisak Lambelsah (at (Thailand) Navy)

== Coaches ==
Head coaches by years (2012 – present)

Name	Period	Honours
Surasak Chumphontri	2012 – 2013	
Jongkon Chanphuang	2014	
Suriyan Jamchen	2015 – 2017	Champion of Thai League 4 North Eastern Region 2017
Preeda Chankra	2018 – 2021	
Pramoul Thinkatork	Sep 2021 – Feb 2022	
Narongthanaphorn Choeithaisongchodok	Aug 2022 – Dec 2024	Runners-up of Thai League 3 2023-24 promoted to Thai League 2 Champion of Thai League 3 North Eastern Region 2023-24
Pipob On-Mo	Dec 2024 – Apr 2025	
Suriyan Jamchen (Interim)	Apr 2025	
Somchai Chuayboonchum	Apr 2025 – present	Runners-up of Thai League 2 2025-26 promoted to Thai League 1

== Honours ==
=== Domestic leagues ===
- Thai League 2
  - Runner-up (1): 2025–26
- Thai League 3
  - Runner-up (1): 2023–24
- Thai League 3 North Eastern Region
  - Winners (1): 2023–24
  - Runner-up (1): 2022–23
- Thai League 4 North Eastern Region
  - Winners (1): 2017
- Regional League Northeast Division
  - Runner-up (1): 2012
