= Kittipong Wongma =

Thai footballer

Personal information
- Full name: Kittipong Wongma
- Date of birth: 14 September 1995 (age 31)
- Place of birth: Surin, Thailand
- Height: 1.80 m (5 ft 11 in)
- Position: Forward

Team information
- Current team: Mahasarakham
- Number: 19

Youth career
- 2010–2013: Sisaket United

Senior career*
Years	Team	Apps	(Gls)
2014	Sisaket United	23	(9)
2015–2017	Sisaket	44	(5)
2016	→ Udon Thani (loan)	20	(6)
2017–2019	Sukhothai	18	(0)
2020	Nakhon Ratchasima	7	(0)
2020	Udon United	8	(2)
2021–2022	Nongbua Pitchaya	4	(0)
2022–2024	Suphanburi	63	(9)
2024–	Mahasarakham	0	(0)

International career^{‡}
2016–2018	Thailand U23	1	(0)
- * Club domestic league appearances and goals as of 12 May 2024 ‡ National team caps and goals as of 12:17, 19 September 2017 (UTC)

Kittipong Wongma (Thai: กิตติพงษ์ วงษ์มา; born September 14, 1995) is a Thai professional footballer who plays for Thai League 2 club Mahasarakham.

== Playing career ==
On 3 December 2014, Kitipong who was 19 years old moved from Sisaket United in Division 2 to Sisaket in Thai League 1. He had the impressive performance for the club in his first season on the top league.

On 28 January 2016, Kittipong Wongma moved to Udon Thani in Division 2 by a loan contract.

== International career ==
On 8 July 2015, Kittipong made an appearance in the match of Thai League All-Star against Reading F.C.
