= Peeratat Phoruendee =

Thai footballer (born 1979)

Personal information
- Full name: Peeratat Phoruendee
- Date of birth: 15 March 1979 (age 47)
- Place of birth: Lopburi, Thailand
- Height: 1.73 m (5 ft 8 in)
- Positions: Right back; center back

Senior career*
Years	Team	Apps	(Gls)
2002–2004	Bangkok Bank	49	(3)
2004–2007	BEC Tero Sasana	109	(8)
2007–2010	TTM Phichit	67	(2)
2011–2012	PTT Rayong	41	(8)
2012	Suphanburi	9	(0)
2013–2014	Angthong	12	(0)
2015–2017	Samutsongkhram	31	(0)
Total		318	(21)

International career
2003–2004	Thailand	11	(1)

Managerial career
- 2025–2026: Kasetsart
- * Club domestic league appearances and goals

Peeratat Phoruendee (Thai: พีรทรรศ์ โพธิ์เรือนดี) is a Thai football coach and former football player. He is a defender who scored one goal for the national team.

He played for BEC Tero Sasana in the ASEAN Club Championship 2003, where the club finished runners-up.

== International goals ==
#	Date	Venue	Opponent	Score	Result	Competition
1.	October 16, 2003	Bangkok, Thailand	India	2-0	Won	Friendly

== Managerial statistics ==
As of matches played 21 March 2026

Managerial record by team and tenure
Team	From	To	Record				
Team	From	To	P	W	D	L	Win %
Kasetsart	23 December 2025	22 March 2026	13	3	5	5	23.1
Total			13	3	5	5	23.1
