= Nacho Abeledo =

Spanish footballer

Personal information
- Full name: Ignacio de Loyola Abeledo Rute
- Date of birth: 5 January 1996 (age 30)
- Place of birth: Huelva, Spain
- Height: 1.82 m (5 ft 11 1/2 in)
- Position: Winger

Team information
- Current team: Chanthaburi
- Number: 7

Youth career
- 2011–2013: Betis

Senior career*
Years	Team	Apps	(Gls)
2013–2016	Betis B	57	(4)
2014	Betis	0	(0)
2016–2017	Barcelona B	7	(2)
2017–2018	Málaga B	30	(19)
2018–2019	Gimnàstic	3	(0)
2019	→ Deportivo B (loan)	18	(2)
2019–2022	San Roque Lepe	66	(23)
2022–2023	Linares	29	(2)
2023–2024	Talavera	30	(2)
2024–2025	Gokulam Kerala	20	(9)
2025–	Chanthaburi	0	(0)

International career
2013	Spain U17	1	(0)
2014	Spain U18	2	(0)
- * Club domestic league appearances and goals as of 23 March 2025

Ignacio "Nacho" de Loyola Abeledo Rute (Spanish pronunciation: [iˈɣnaθjo ˈnatʃo ðe loˈʝola aβeˈleðo ˈrute]; born 5 January 1996) is a Spanish professional footballer who plays as a left winger for the Thai League 2 club Chanthaburi.

== Club career ==
Born in Huelva, Andalusia, Abeledo joined Real Betis' youth setup in 2011, aged 15. On 15 April 2013 he signed a professional contract with the club.

On 28 November 2013, while still a junior, Abeledo appeared on the bench in a 0–1 away loss against Lyon, in that season's UEFA Europa League. In January of the following year he made his senior debuts with the reserves in the Tercera División; shortly after he made his first-team debut, coming on as a late substitute in a 1–0 home win over Athletic Bilbao, in that season's Copa del Rey.

On 6 June 2016 Abeledo signed a three-year deal with another reserve team, FC Barcelona B, also playing in the third tier. On 2 September of the following year, he joined Málaga CF and was assigned to the B-team in the fourth division.

On 4 August 2018, after scoring a career-best 19 goals, Abeledo signed a two-year contract with Gimnàstic de Tarragona of the Segunda División, after terminating his contract with Málaga. The following 8 January, after being rarely used, he was loaned to Deportivo Fabril until June.

== International career ==
On 14 January 2013 Abeledo was called up for the Spain under-17's, Nine days later he appeared as a second-half substitute of a 1–0 success over Italy.
