= Jakarat Tonhongsa =

Thai footballer

Personal information
- Full name: Jakarat Tonhongsa
- Date of birth: 29 September 1973 (age 53)
- Place of birth: Roi Et, Thailand
- Height: 1.82 m (6 ft 0 in)
- Position: Defender

Senior career*
| Years | Team | Apps | (Gls) |
| 199?–1995 | Thai Farmer Bank | | |
| 1996–2001 | Osotsapa | | |
| 2002 | Bangkok Christian | | |
| 2003–2007 | Chula-Sinthana | | |

International career
| 1996–1997 | Thailand | 8 | (2) |

Managerial career
- 2012–2014: Roi Et United
- 2015: Ubon UMT United
- 2015: Sakaeo
- 2016: BCC FC
- 2017–2018: Muangthong United (youth)
- 2018: Bangkok
- 2020: Udon Thani
- 2020–2021: Port (assistant)
- 2021–2025: Mahasarakham SBT
- 2026–: Port (assistant coach)
- * Club domestic league appearances and goals

Jakarat Tonhongsa (born 29 September 1973, Thai: จักรราช โทนหงษา) is a Thai retired football coach and former player, who is the assistant coach of Thai League 1 club Port.

== Managerial statistics ==
As of match played 20 September 2025

Managerial record by team and tenure
| Team | Nat | From | To | Record | | | | |
| Team | Nat | From | To | G | W | D | L | Win % |
|---|---|---|---|---|---|---|---|---|
| Bangkok | (Thailand) | 12 February 2018 | 30 November 2018 | 1 | 0 | 0 | 1 | 0.00 |
| Udon Thani | (Thailand) | 17 January 2020 | 19 August 2020 | 4 | 0 | 3 | 1 | 0.00 |
| Mahasarakham SBT | (Thailand) | 21 October 2021 | 21 September 2025 | 58 | 21 | 15 | 22 | 36.21 |
| Career Total | | | | 63 | 21 | 18 | 24 | 33.33 |

== Honours ==
=== Manager ===
Individual

- Thai League 2 Manager of the Month: November 2024
