= Thongchai Rungreangles =

Thai football manager (born 1986)

Thongchai Rungrenagles
Personal information
- Full name: Thongchai Rungreangles
- Date of birth: 8 December 1986 (age 39)
- Place of birth: Phrae, Thailand

Team information
- Current team: Hougang United (Assistant Coach)

Managerial career
- Years: Team
- 2015–2018: Thailand U19 (assistant)
- 2018: Thailand U16
- 2020–2022: Prey Veng
- 2022–2026: Phrae United
- 2026: Chanthaburi
- 2026–: Hougang United (assistant)

Thongchai Rungrenagles (Thai: ธงชัย รุ่งเรืองเลิศ; born 8 December 1986) is a Thai professional football manager who is currently the assistant coach of Singapore Premier League club Hougang United.

== Managerial career ==
Rungrenagles obtained an AFC Professional Coaching Diploma and started his managerial career as assistant manager of the Thailand national under-19 football team in 2015, helping the team win the 2015 AFF U-19 Youth Championship. In 2018, he was appointed manager of the Thailand national under-17 football team.

One year later, he was appointed as a youth manager of Thai side BG Pathum United. In 2020, he was appointed manager of Cambodian side Prey Veng. Subsequently, he was appointed manager of Phrae United in 2022. During his first season with the club, he helped them achieve qualification to the promotion play-offs. However they were unable to achieve promotion, knocked out in the semi-finals.

== Managerial statistics ==
As of match played 25 April 2026

Managerial record by team and tenure
Team	Nat.	From	To	Record								Ref.
Team	Nat.	From	To	G	W	D	L	GF	GA	GD	Win %	Ref.
Thailand U16	(Thailand)	1 July 2018	8 October 2018	3	1	0	2	7	9	−2	33.33	
Prey Veng	(Cambodia)	30 June 2020	15 February 2022	2	0	0	2	3	5	−2	0.00	
Phrae United	(Thailand)	14 February 2022	7 February 2026	124	51	34	39	182	166	+16	41.13	
Chanthaburi	(Thailand)	11 February 2026	11 June 2026	11	2	5	4	14	13	+1	18.18	
Career Total				140	54	39	47	206	193	+13	38.57	

== Honours ==
=== Manager ===
Individual

- Thai League 2 Manager of the Month: September 2024
