= Suppawat Srinothai =

Thai footballer, born 1988

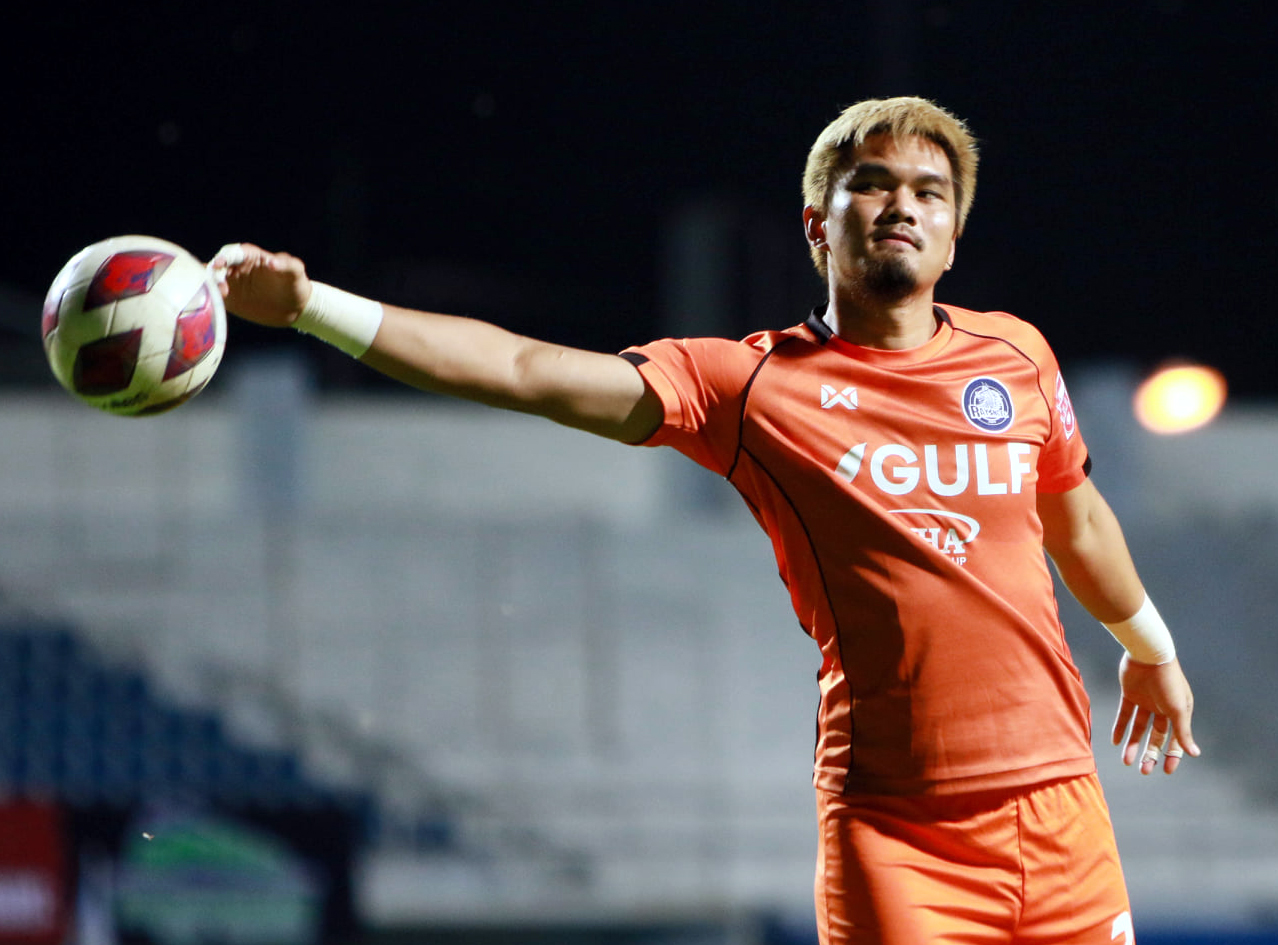
- Suppawat Srinothai playing for Rayong.

Personal information
- Full name: Suppawat Srinothai
- Date of birth: 5 September 1988 (age 38)
- Place of birth: Sakon Nakhon, Thailand
- Height: 1.86 m (6 ft 1 in)
- Position: Goalkeeper

Team information
- Current team: Chanthaburi

Senior career*
Years	Team	Apps	(Gls)
2012	Udon Thani	28	(0)
2013	Singhtarua	0	(0)
2014	Ratchaburi	0	(0)
2015–2016	Air Force Central	29	(0)
2017	Sisaket	20	(0)
2019–2020	Trat	35	(0)
2021–2022	Rayong	30	(0)
2022–2024	Trat	45	(0)
2024–2025	Phrae United	29	(0)
2025–	Chanthaburi	0	(0)
- * Club domestic league appearances and goals as of 30 April 2024

Suppawat Srinothai (Thai: ศุภวัฒน์ สีโนทัย, born May 9, 1988), simply known as Ten (Thai: เท็น), is a Thai professional footballer who plays as a goalkeeper for Thai League 2 club Chanthaburi.
