= Santi Chaiyaphuak =

Thai footballer and manager (born 1978)

Personal information
- Full name: Santi Chaiyaphuak
- Date of birth: 19 July 1978 (age 48)
- Place of birth: Ayutthaya, Thailand
- Height: 1.68 m (5 ft 6 in)
- Positions: Left midfielder; left back

Team information
- Current team: Nongbua Pitchaya (head coach)

Senior career*
Years	Team	Apps	(Gls)
1999–2003	Sinthana	51	(14)
2004–2008	Tampines Rovers	104	(7)
2009–2010	Pattaya United	41	(3)
2011	Muangthong United	12	(0)
2011–2012	Suphanburi	22	(5)
2012	TOT	6	(0)
2012	Chainat	3	(0)
Total		239	(29)

International career
2002	Thailand	2	(0)

Managerial career
- 2012–2018: Muangthong United (assistant)
- 2018: Muangthong United (caretaker)
- 2018: Ayutthaya United (caretaker)
- 2018–2019: Suphanburi (assistant)
- 2020–2021: Ayutthaya United
- 2021–2022: Sisaket
- 2022–2023: Ayutthaya United
- 2023–2024: Trat
- 2024–2025: Kasetsart
- 2026: Trat
- 2026–: Nongbua Pitchaya
- * Club domestic league appearances and goals as of 28 June 2008

Santi Chaiyaphurk (Thai: สันติ ไชยเผือก) is a Thai football manager and former football player. While at Pattaya United, he was the captain of the club. He is the head coach of Thai League 2 club Nongbua Pitchaya.

== Managerial statistics ==
As of match played 22 November 2026

Managerial record by team and tenure
Team	From	To	Record				
Team	From	To	P	W	D	L	Win %
Muangthong United	12 March 2018	29 April 2018	8	3	5	0	37.5
Ayutthaya United	29 August 2018	17 September 2018	2	1	1	0	50.0
Ayutthaya United	1 January 2020	1 April 2021	34	13	8	13	38.2
Sisaket	21 July 2021	9 July 2022	5	1	0	4	20.0
Ayutthaya United	13 July 2022	16 February 2023	29	15	3	11	51.7
Trat	18 June 2023	30 May 2024	33	7	8	18	21.2
Kasetsart	10 July 2024	21 December 2025	53	16	18	19	30.2
Trat	1 January 2026	30 June 2026	17	8	6	3	47.1
Nongbua Pitchaya	2 July 2026	Present	14	7	4	3	50.0
Total			195	71	53	71	36.4

== Honours ==
=== Player ===
- S.League: Champion (2004, 2005), with Tampines Rovers FC
- Singapore Cup: Champion (2004, 2006), with Tampines Rovers FC
- ASEAN Club Championship: Champion (2005), with Tampines Rovers FC
