= Anucha Chaiyawong =

Thai footballer

Personal information
- Full name: Anucha Chaiyawong
- Date of birth: 18 March 1985 (age 41)
- Place of birth: Chiang Mai, Thailand
- Height: 1.85 m (6 ft 1 in)
- Position: Striker

Senior career*
Years	Team	Apps	(Gls)
2007–2008	PEA		
2009–2010	TTM Samut Sakhon		
2011	Chiangmai		
2012	Lamphun Warrior		
2013–2015	Hua Hin City		
2015	→ TOT (loan)		
2016–2017	Nan		
2018–2019	Ayutthaya		

Managerial career
- 2020–2021: Nan
- 2023–2024: Chiangmai United (assistant)
- 2024–2026: Chiangmai United
- 2026–: Uttaradit
- * Club domestic league appearances and goals as of 11 October 2008

Anucha Chaiyawong (Thai: อนุชา ไชยวงค์) is a Thai football coach and former player. He is the currently caretaker head coach of Thai League 2 club Uttaradit.

== Managerial statistics ==
As of match played 22 November 2026

Managerial record by team and tenure
Team	Nat	From	To	Record							
Team	Nat	From	To	G	W	D	L	GF	GA	GD	Win %
Chiangmai United	(Thailand)	20 September 2024	19 February 2026	54	22	9	23	78	83	−5	40.74
Uttaradit	(Thailand)	19 February 2026	Present	21	10	7	4	39	27	+12	47.62
Career Total				75	32	16	27	117	110	+7	42.67

== Honours ==
- Thailand Premier League 2008
