= Chanthaburi Province Stadium =

Stadium in Chanthaburi Province, Thailand

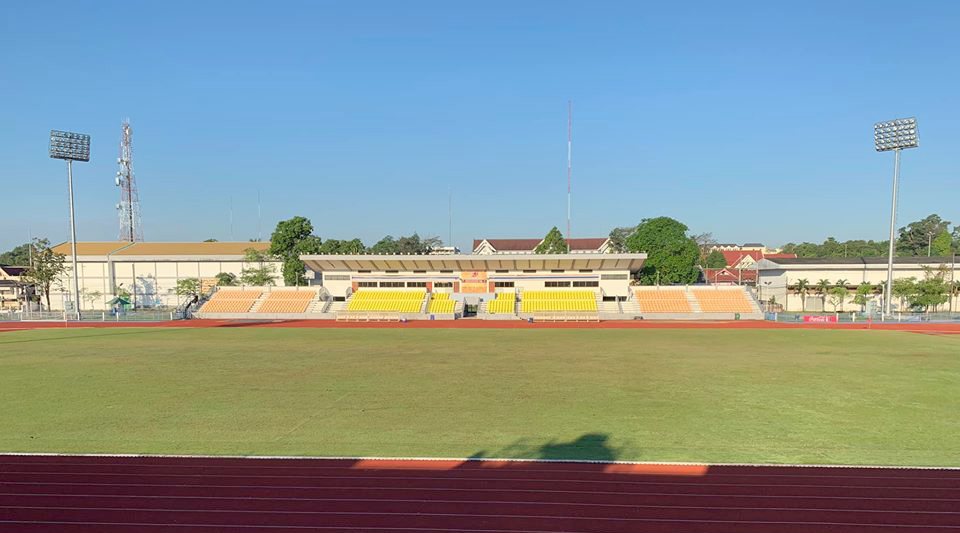
- Interactive map of Chanthaburi Province Stadium
- Location: Chanthaburi, Thailand
- Coordinates: 12°36′36″N 102°06′20″E
- Capacity: 5,000
- Surface: Grass

Tenant
- Chanthaburi F.C.

Chanthaburi Province Stadium or Chanthaburi PAO. Stadium (Thai: สนามกีฬาจังหวัดจันทบุรี หรือ สนาม อบจ. จันทบุรี) is a multi-purpose stadium in Chanthaburi Province, Thailand. It is currently used mostly for football matches and is the home stadium of Chanthaburi F.C. The stadium holds 5,000 people.
