= Chanthaburi F.C. =

Thai association football club

Chanthaburi จันทบุรี เอฟซี
- Full name: Chanthaburi Football Club สโมสรฟุตบอลจังหวัดจันทบุรี
- Nicknames: The Wild Rabbits (กระต่ายป่า)
- Founded: 2004; 22 years ago
- Ground: Chanthaburi Province Stadium; Chanthaburi, Thailand
- Capacity: 5,000
- Chairman: Jirachai Khaonongbua
- Head coach: Teerasak Po-on
- League: Thai League 2
- 2025–26: Thai League 2, 14th of 18
Home colours	Away colours

Chanthaburi Football Club (Thai: สโมสรฟุตบอลจังหวัดจันทบุรี) is a Thai professional football club based in Chanthaburi province. The club is currently playing in the Thai League 2.

== History ==
The club was formed in 2004. By the year 2006 is not clear in which league the club has played. In the statistics there are also a team from Chanthaburi, has reached the 1984 final of the Cup. does not clarify whether this is the same club. The 2006 season but the club played in the Thailand Provincial League and won the 8th place. The Provincial League, which was run by the Sports Federation Thailand, left the club for the 2007 season and moved to the Thailand Division 1 League. This league is under the Thai Football Association. Place in the 2007 season could confirm the placement in 2008 with nearly a fifth place. With 13 points behind, however, nothing to do with the rise.

In consecutive seasons in 2009 Thai Division 1 League and 2010 Thai Division 1 League, Chantaburi finished only 2 points and one place above the drop zone to avoid relegation to Regional League Division 2.

Samut Songkram's former coach, Somchai Chuayboonchum, will take charge of Chantaburi for the 2011 campaign. He has brought several of his ex-players from Samut Songkhram to the Hares.

In 2022, Chanthaburi competed in the Thai League 3 for the 2022–23 season. It is their 17th season in the professional league. The club started the season with a 2–1 home win over Navy and they ended the season with a 1–1 away draw with Navy. The club has finished 2nd place in the league of the Eastern region and advanced to the national championship stage. In addition, in the 2022–23 Thai FA Cup Chanthaburi was defeated 1–4 by Chiangrai United in the second round, causing them to be eliminated and in the 2022–23 Thai League Cup Chanthaburi was defeated 1–3 by Customs United in the qualification play-off round, causing them to be eliminated too.

== Stadium and locations ==
Coordinates	Location	Stadium	Capacity	Year
12°36′36″N 102°06′20″E	Chanthaburi	Chanthaburi Province Stadium	5,000	2007–2010
12°39′50″N 102°06′06″E	Chanthaburi	Rambhai Barni Rajabhat University Stadium	8,800	2011
12°36′36″N 102°06′20″E	Chanthaburi	Chanthaburi Province Stadium	5,000	2012–2013
12°39′50″N 102°06′06″E	Chanthaburi	Rambhai Barni Rajabhat University Stadium	8,800	2014
12°36′36″N 102°06′20″E	Chanthaburi	Chanthaburi Province Stadium	5,000	2015–2017

== Season by season record ==
Season	League									FA Cup	League Cup	Top goalscorer league	
Season	Division	P	W	D	L	F	A	Pts	Pos	FA Cup	League Cup	Name	Goals
2006	DIV1								8th	Opted out			
2007	DIV1 B	22	8	7	7	37	27	31	4th	Opted out			
2008	DIV1	30	12	6	12	49	48	42	5th	Opted out		(Thailand) Witthaya Lhoareang	16
2009	DIV1	30	8	8	14	50	61	32	13th	R4		(Thailand) Sirisak Musbu-ngor	17
2010	DIV1	30	9	10	11	38	40	37	12th	R2	R2	(Thailand) Sirisak Musbu-ngor	9
2011	DIV1	34	11	8	15	39	48	41	12th	R3	R1	(Ivory Coast) Kassiaty Gildas Labi	10
2012	DIV1	34	0	4	29	22	111	4	18th	R2	R1	(Thailand) Prawit Wasoontara	4
2013	DIV2 Central-East	26	14	4	8	35	24	46	4th	Opted out	Opted out		
2014	DIV2 Central-East	26	10	5	11	38	41	35	8th	Opted out	Opted out		
2015	DIV2 Central-East	26	13	4	9	37	33	43	5th	Opted out	QR2		
2016	DIV2 East	22	6	8	8	21	22	26	10th	R2	R2		
2017	T4 East	27	14	9	4	40	23	51	1st	R2	Opted out	(Cameroon) Mbassegus Mbarga	11
2018	T4 East	27	14	6	7	39	27	48	2nd	QR	QR1	(Thailand) Chainarong Samuttha	16
2019	T4 East	28	7	7	14	30	44	28	6th	QR	Opted out	(Thailand) Tripop Janoensheep	9
2020–21	T3 East	16	2	5	9	13	26	11	11th	Opted out	QR2	(Thailand) Tripop Janoensheep	2
2021–22	T3 East	22	4	7	11	28	38	19	8th	Opted out	Opted out	(United States) Htoo Kapaw	5
2022–23	T3 East	22	11	7	4	35	18	40	2nd	R2	QRP	(Brazil) Luan Santos	13
2023–24	T2	34	9	13	12	44	44	40	12th	Opted out	QR2	(Brazil) Wander Luiz	10
2024–25	T2	32	10	8	14	37	48	38	13th	QF	R1	(Brazil) Tiago Chulapa	18
2025–26	T2	34	10	10	14	44	46	40	14th	QR	Opted out	(Spain) Nacho Abeledo	11
2026–27	T2										Opted out		

Champions	Runners-up	Third place	Promoted	Relegated

- P = Played
- W = Games won
- D = Games drawn
- L = Games lost
- F = Goals for
- A = Goals against
- Pts = Points
- Pos = Final position
- QR1 = First Qualifying Round
- QR2 = Second Qualifying Round
- R1 = Round 1
- R2 = Round 2
- R3 = Round 3
- R4 = Round 4
- R5 = Round 5
- R6 = Round 6
- QF = Quarter-finals
- SF = Semi-finals
- RU = Runners-up
- W = Winners

== Players ==
=== Current squad ===
As of 30 June 2026

Note: Flags indicate national team as defined under FIFA eligibility rules; some limited exceptions apply. Players may hold more than one non-FIFA nationality.

No.	Pos.	Nation	Player
1	GK	THA	Anusit Termmee
4	DF	THA	Maxx Creevey
5	DF	THA	Putthinan Wannasri
6	DF	AUS	Caio De Godoy
7	FW	ESP	Nacho Abeledo
9	FW	BRA	Weslley Smith
10	FW	BRA	Luan Costa
11	MF	THA	Jetsada Batchari
14	FW	THA	Nattawut Suksum (on loan from BG Pathum United)
15	MF	THA	Panyawat Nisangram
16	MF	THA	Santitorn Lattirom
17	FW	THA	Watcharakorn Manoworn
19	GK	THA	Klanarong Wisuttiyanpirom
20	MF	THA	Promdan Benchasiri

No.	Pos.	Nation	Player
21	GK	THA	Prin Goonchorn
22	FW	THA	Caelan Tanadon Ryan (on loan from Port)
23	FW	THA	Somkid Chamnarnsilp
24	MF	THA	Phanuphong Phonsa
25	GK	THA	Suppawat Srinothai
27	DF	THA	Chatchai Chiakklang
29	MF	THA	Sarawut Thorarit
33	DF	THA	Kittiphat Kullapha (on loan from Rayong)
52	MF	THA	Thammayut Tonkam
64	MF	THA	Apiwat Hanchai
66	MF	THA	Jirattikan Vapilai
88	MF	THA	Tatchanon Nakarawong
91	DF	THA	Jirawat Thongsaengphrao
98	DF	THA	Tirapon Thanachartkul
99	DF	THA	Suwat Junboonpha

== Technical staff ==
Position	Name
Team manager	(Thailand) Thanadet Saengurai
Head coach	(Thailand) Teerasak Po-on
Assistant coach	(Thailand) Thiti Sangsri (Brazil) Victor Amaro
Goalkeeper coach	(Thailand) Sumon Klakrp
Fitness coach	(Thailand) Kraisorn Srihajon
Team officer	(Thailand) Attawut Phom-on (Thailand) Chanin Kesee
Technical director	(Thailand) Somchai Subpherm

== Honours ==
=== Domestic ===
- Thai League 4 Eastern Region
  - Champions (1): 2017
- Thailand FA Cup
  - Runners-up (1): 1984
