= Sitthichok Tassanai =

Thai footballer (born 1991)

Personal information
- Full name: Sitthichok Tassanai
- Date of birth: 7 June 1991 (age 35)
- Place of birth: Chonburi, Thailand
- Height: 1.80 m (5 ft 11 in)
- Position: Defensive midfielder

Youth career
- 2007–2010: Bangkok Sports School

Senior career*
Years	Team	Apps	(Gls)
2011–2014	Bangkok	64	(3)
2015–2026	Police Tero	152	(0)

Managerial career
- 2025: Police Tero (Interim)
- 2026: Police Tero (Assistant Coach)
- 2026: Police Tero
- * Club domestic league appearances and goals as of 19 December 2025 ‡ National team caps and goals as of 13 May 2023

Sitthichok Tassanai (Thai: สิทธิโชค ทัศนัย; born 7 June 1991), simply known as Tun (Thai: ตุ๋น), is a Thai professional football manager and former professional footballer.

== Managerial statistics ==
As of match played 17 October 2026

Managerial record by team and tenure
Team	Nat.	From	To	Record					Ref.
Team	Nat.	From	To	G	W	D	L	Win %	Ref.
Police Tero (caretaker)	(Thailand)	28 October 2025	6 November 2025	2	1	1	0	50.00	
Police Tero	(Thailand)	15 July 2026	Present	7	3	1	3	42.86	
Career Total				9	4	2	3	44.44	
