= Muang Thai Life Assurance =

Thai life insurance company

Muang Thai Life Assurance Public Company Limited
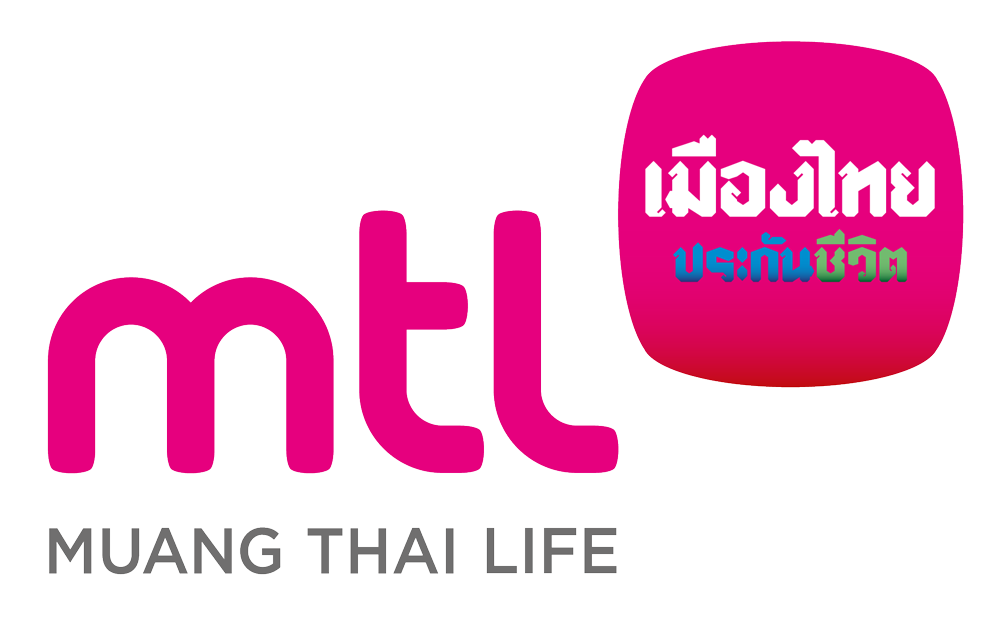

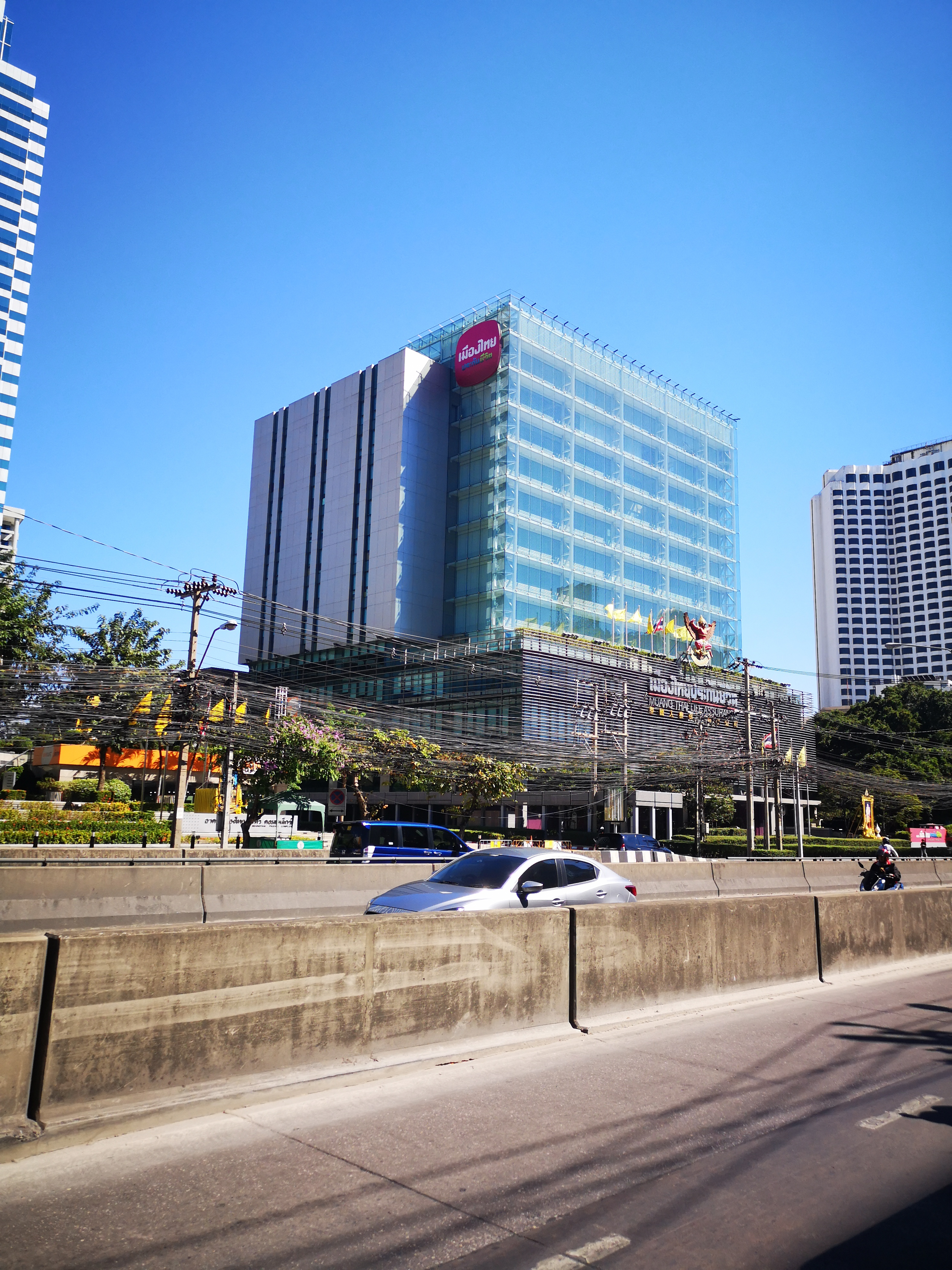
- Type: Public limited company
- Industry: Life assurance
- Founded: April 6, 1951; 75 years ago
- Founder: Chulin Lamsam
- Headquarters: Bangkok, Thailand
- Owner: Sara Lamsam
- Website: www.muangthai.co.th

Muang Thai Life Assurance PCL. (Thai: บริษัท เมืองไทยประกันชีวิต จำกัด (มหาชน)) is a Thai life insurance company based in Bangkok. The company’s headquarters is at street no. 250, Ratchadaphisek Road, Huai Khwang.

== History ==
The company was officially founded on 6 April 1951. The first headquarters of the company was on Suapa Road, Bangkok. One of the founders was Chulind Lamsam, Managing Director, along with business associates and high-ranking officers in the government sector. The company served as a source of fund for the government sector. Also the company offered long-term savings. This helped in the efforts to develop economic, trade and industrial sectors of the country.

The company was the first life insurance company to be appointed under the royal patronage of King Bhumibol Adulyadej, which entitled the company to bear on all company’s documents the royal Garuda emblem. Muang Thai Life Assurance was also the first life insurance company that attained the International Standard Certification ISO 9001:2000.

The company continued to grow and in the year 2010 had a countrywide network of more than 250 branches, including agency offices. The chairman was Photipong Lamsam, Sara Lamsam was Director- President and Chief Executive Officer.
