= List of Udon Thani F.C. players =

Udon Thani Football Club is a Thai professional football club based in Udon Thani province in north-eastern Thailand. The club was formed in 1999, and played their first competitive match in November the same year, when they entered the Provincial League.

Below is a list of footballers who have played for Udon Thani Football Club.

== List of players ==
- Appearances and goals are for first-team competitive matches only, including Regional League, Provincial League, Regional Champions League, FA Cup and League Cup matches.
- Players are listed according to their last year at the club, so current players are listed on top.

Appearances correct from 2011 to match played 14 December 2014

Name	Nationality	Pos	Udon Thani career	Apps	Goals
Amnach Worawiboon	Thailand	MF	2009-2010-2011; 2012-2013-2014-2015-	91	2
Wirapong Wannasiri	Thailand	DF	2009-2010-2011; 2012-2013-2015-	67	
Tewa Saengnako	Thailand	MF	2009-2010-2011; 2013-2014-2015-	40	3
Thanathip Paengwong	Thailand	MF	2011-2012-2013; 2014-2015-	78	1
Satja Saengsuwan	Thailand	DF	2011-2012-2013; 2014-2015-	77	2
Katawut Kuanchom	Thailand	FW	2010-2011-2014-2015-	8	0
Tredsak Samart	Thailand	FW	2011-2012-2013-2015-	50	
Chaimongkol Botnok	Thailand	DF	2013-2014-2015-	33	2
Promphong Kransumrong	Thailand	FW	2015-	0	0
Pattanapong Choomjun	Thailand	DF	2015-	0	0
Krisada Pissa	Thailand	FW	2015-	0	0
Sarayuth Kaewprae	Thailand	FW	2015-	0	0
Jakkrit Kemnak	Thailand	DF	2015-	0	0
Taiwat Ratanabudta	Thailand	GK	2015-	0	0
Suchin Yen-Arrom	Thailand	GK	2015-	0	0
Souleymane Couibaly	Mali	FW	2015-	0	0
Patipan Kamsat	Thailand	FW	2015-	0	0
Watchara Masuk	Thailand	GK	2015-	0	0
Ángel Guirado	Philippines Spain	MF	2015-	0	0
Adriano Pellegrino	Australia Italy	MF	2015-	0	0
Narongdet Raksanoi Solbakken	Thailand Norway	MF	2015-	0	0
Tinnapob Srisathit	Thailand	FW	2015-	0	0
Tedsada Batchalee	Thailand	FW	2015-	0	0
Wattanacha Novatud	Thailand	FW	2015-	0	0
Dusit Borcumgert	Thailand	GK	2015-	0	0
Patiput Cumsut	Thailand	FW	2015-	0	0
Pavaris Yongtragool	Thailand	FW	2015-	0	0
Naledome Tipmonton	Thailand	FW	2015-	0	0
Andriy Boyko	Ukraine	DF	2015-	0	0
Behshad Yavarzadeh	Iran	MF	2015-	0	0
Pannawich Nontalee	Thailand	FW	2015-	0	0
Kittipan Jantatum	Thailand	MF	2015-	0	0
Apichat Thaenhin	Thailand	DF	2009-2010-2011; 2012-2013-2014	64	1
Atthapol Phothikrajang	Thailand	GK	2010-2011-2012; 2014	45	0
Udomporn Somkong	Thailand	DF	2011-2013-2014	23	0
Soonthorn Woraboot	Thailand	GK	2012-2013-2014	1	0
Pattarapon Sutthidee	Thailand	MF	2011-2014	35	2
Siwakorn Mueanseelao	Thailand	DF	2012-2014	5	0
Chettha Kokaew	Thailand	FW	2013-2014	46	6
Phakpoom Malirungruang	Thailand	MF	2013-2014	35	1
Puttakun Narin	Thailand	MF	2013-2014	35	0
Panupon Chomputus	Thailand	GK	2013-2014	19	0
Panu Pue-Lueang	Thailand	MF	2013-2014	2	0
Tomiwa Bolarinwa	England	FW	2014	21	7
Theodore Yuyun	Cameroon	MF	2014	21	4
Nenebi Tra Sylvestre	Ivory Coast	DF	2014	20	2
Wanlop Phunyudod	Thailand	DF	2014	20	0
Patipol Phetwiset	Thailand	FW	2014	19	4
Pornpong Pornjamsai	Thailand	DF	2014	19	0
Tomohiro Onodera	Japan	FW	2014	16	4
Sirodom Singtepphan	Thailand	FW	2014	16	1
Rangsan Roobmoh	Thailand	FW	2014	15	1
Sittipong Kaullapapluek	Thailand	MF	2014	14	0
Marcio Da Silva Santos	Brazil	MF	2014	11	0
Saksit Yuencheewit	Thailand	FW	2014	10	4
Shahin Shafiei	Iran	MF	2014	10	0
Nuttawut Jansena	Thailand	FW	2014	9	1
Narathip Phanprom	Thailand	GK	2014	7	0
Korakote Chotewattanamas	Thailand	DF	2014	7	0
Thibet Am-phun	Thailand	MF	2014	5	0
Pairat Kattiwong	Thailand	MF	2014	5	0
Watchara Wongsuwan	Thailand	MF	2014	3	0
Chanachon Boonsorn	Thailand	MF	2014	2	0
Kritkamon Matthapanung	Thailand	MF	2014	2	0
Surachai Namtapee	Thailand	DF	2014	0	0
Thawatchai Pol-Sa	Thailand	GK	2014	0	0
Wisanupong Wisetthong	Thailand	DF	2014	0	0
Suwirut Nonkhukhetkhong	Thailand	DF	2014	0	0
Ratchanon Phangkaew	Thailand	DF	2011-2012-2013	81	
Thammawut Rungruang	Thailand	MF	2010-2012-2013	40	
Esoh Paul Omogba	Nigeria	FW	2012-2013	46	22
Mamady Kakoro	Guinea	DF	2012-2013	44	
Oyewole Yemi Joseph	Nigeria	MF	2013	40	16
Wichitchai Raksa	Thailand	GK	2013	27	
Kofi Debrah Derrick	Ghana	MF	2013	22	
Niyom Kamchompoo	Thailand	FW	2013	21	
Nattapon Janthupa	Thailand	MF	2013	19	
Pouya Hosseini	Iran	FW	2013	19	14
Atthaplon Wongsoonton	Thailand	FW	2013	18	
Rermrat Ngamjaroen	Thailand	MF	2013	17	
Kamolsit Kingchaiwong	Thailand	MF	2013	10	
Justine Uche Eke	Nigeria	FW	2013	10	
Kritsanapong Bureepakdee	Thailand	GK	2013	4	
Panupong Suaychai	Thailand	MF	2013	2	
Jiradech Sangsanga	Thailand	MF	2013	2	
Prachya Onseeta	Thailand	FW	2013	2	
Arthit Ngonphukhiew	Thailand	FW	2013	2	
Nattasit Uppachai	Thailand	MF	2013	1	
Niyom Unasing	Thailand	MF	2011-2012	15	
Kunakorn Puengpa	Thailand	MF	2010-2012	0	
Suppawat Srinothai	Thailand	GK	2012	28	
Akesatha Thanyakam	Thailand	MF	2012	23	
Ogbeni Ogbeide Augustine	Nigeria	FW	2012	23	
Ousmanou Mohamadou	Cameroon	FW	2012	22	24
Tanakorn Krasin	Thailand	DF	2012	12	
Danuson Phuisaengchan	Thailand	MF	2012	10	
Chanchai Nanseebut	Thailand	MF	2012	10	
Pattarapol Panyasiri	Thailand	MF	2012	8	
Ildar Amirov	Kyrgyzstan	FW	2012	8	
Songsak Chaisamak	Thailand	DF	2012	7	
Choi Min-Kuk	South Korea	MF	2012	7	
Tanawat Mahaweerarat	Thailand	MF	2012	5	
Adison Pimpasee	Thailand	DF	2012	4	
Apisit Kwankwai	Thailand	DF	2012	4	
Almazbek Mirzaliev	Kyrgyzstan	DF	2012	4	
Kamonpan Namtae	Thailand	DF	2012	3	
Arnon Yangkum	Thailand	DF	2012	1	
Ronnarong Wongsri	Thailand	DF	2012	1	
Paul Papa Djangmah	Ghana	FW	2012	1	
Chakkrit Banterngsuk	Thailand	DF	2012	0	
Nikorn Saengmee	Thailand	GK	2012	0	
Kittisak Akkabut	Thailand	DF	2012	0	
Peerapong Tanarueang-amorn	Thailand	DF	2012	0	
Narongdech Poolakorn	Thailand	MF	2009-2010-2011	15	
Mangkorn Noichompoo	Thailand	DF	2009-2010-2011	4	
Surasak Kodseela	Thailand	GK	2009-2010-2011	2	
Dechsakda Tawasuk	Thailand	MF	2010-2011	9	
Suppanich Suparatanakul	Thailand	FW	2010-2011	7	
Thiany Camara	Guinea	DF	2011	15	
Thana Okkaset	Thailand	DF	2011	14	
Eakkachai Sinnok	Thailand	DF	2011	13	
Eakkapob Srichan	Thailand	DF	2011	13	
Mathee Pungpho	Thailand	DF	2011	12	
Weerawat Kaewraksee	Thailand	FW	2011	10	
Nattapong Roaproo	Thailand	DF	2011	8	
Santos Sesay	Sierra Leone	MF	2011	7	
Weerachai Kansila	Thailand	DF	2011	7	
Padungsak Suphakit	Thailand	DF	2011	6	
Yingyong Ratchatangjai	Thailand	DF	2011	6	
Uklit Teerajanthanon	Thailand	GK	2011	6	
Wuttisak Sreeladlao	Thailand	DF	2011	6	
Chatchai Tiangcharoen	Thailand	GK	2011	5	
Direk Sawangsri	Thailand	DF	2011	3	
Ayouba Komara	Guinea	MF	2011	3	
Niran Sankrod	Thailand	DF	2011	3	
Monton Plamsitti	Thailand	GK	2011	3	
Thierry Tchamba	Cameroon	DF	2011	2	
Sakcha Deenoy	Thailand	DF	2011	1	
Chathee Kongsadhen	Thailand	GK	2011	0	
Arun Chaiyasit	Thailand	GK	2011	0	
Surachai Tantasut	Thailand	DF	2009-2010		
Somjit Poosa	Thailand	DF	2009-2010		
Likit Keawniwong	Thailand	DF	2009-2010		
Thawatchai Yawara	Thailand	GK	2009-2010		
Verrayut Labnongsang	Thailand	DF	2010		
Surasit Janneua	Thailand	DF	2010		
Terrapan Sreenoi	Thailand	MF	2010		
Teerapat Sreenoi	Thailand	DF	2010		
Narit Torat	Thailand	MF	2010		
Passati Lom-on	Thailand	DF	2009		
Somchai Thammathet	Thailand	FW	2009		
Charnvit Pimpa	Thailand	MF	2009		
Suriyan Nadabood	Thailand	FW	2009		
Ekkarak Boonpan	Thailand	DF	2009		
Adisorn Pilakul	Thailand	FW	2009		
Sarayut Pue-nuan	Thailand	DF	2009		
Weerayut Suebsai	Thailand	MF	2009		
Sittisak Somsri	Thailand	GK	2009		
Jirasak Janpoom	Thailand	MF	2009		
Tanakorn Sanguansiri	Thailand	DF	2009		
Anon Laokota	Thailand	DF	2009		

== Key to positions ==
GK	Goalkeeper	DF	Defender	MF	Midfielder	FW	Forward
