= 2013 Regional League Division 2 North Eastern Region =

Regional League North-East Region
- Season: 2013

2013 Regional League Division 2 North-East Region is the 5th season of the League competition since its establishment in 2009. It is in the third tier of the Thai football league system. The league winners and runners up will qualify for the 2013 Regional League Division 2 championship stage.

== Changes from last season ==
=== Team changes ===
==== Promoted clubs ====
No club was promoted to the Thai Division 1 League. Last years league champions Roi Et United and runners up Sisaket United failed to qualify from the 2012 Regional League Division 2 championship pool.

==== Renamed clubs ====
- Surin renamed Surin City.
- Ubon Rachathani renamed Ubon UMT

== Stadium and locations ==
Locations of the Regional League North Eastern Teams in 2013

Team	Location	Stadium	Capacity	Ref.
Roi Et United	Roi Et	Roi Et Province Stadium	3,066	
Loei City	Loei	Loei Province Stadium	3,628	
Yasothon United	Yasothon	Suan Phayathan Stadium	3,245	
Surin City	Surin	Sri Narong Stadium	5,673	
Kalasin	Kalasin	Kalasin Province Stadium	2,580	
Nakhon Phanom	Nakhon Phanom	Nakhon Phanom Province Stadium	4,477	
Sakon Nakhon	Sakon Nakhon	Sakon Nakhon City municipality Stadium	3,449	
Udon Thani	Udon Thani	Institute of Physical Education Udon Thani Stadium	4,705	
Nong Khai FT	Nong Khai	Nong Khai Province Stadium	4,500	
Ubon UMT	Ubon Rachathani	Ubon Rachathani Sports School Stadium	2,945	
Chaiyaphum United	Chaiyaphum	Chaiyaphum Province Stadium	1,957	
Mahasarakham United	Mahasarakham	Mahasarakham Rajabhat University Stadium	3,171	
Mukdahan City	Mukdahan	Mukdahan Province Stadium	5,000	
Nong Bua Lamphu	Nong Bua Lamphu	Nong Bua Lamphu Province Stadium	6,053	
Sisaket United	Sisaket	Sri Nakhon Lamduan Stadium	9,000	
Amnat Charoen Town	Amnat Charoen	Amnat Charoen municipal Stadium	2,500	

== League table ==
Pos	Team	Pld	W	D	L	GF	GA	GD	Pts	Qualification
1	Roi Et (C, Q)	30	20	8	2	63	15	+48	68	Champions League Round
2	Udon Thani (Q)	30	18	5	7	53	25	+28	59	Champions League Round
3	Ubon UMT	30	14	9	7	41	29	+12	51	
4	Nong Khai FT	30	13	9	8	40	29	+11	48	
5	Surin City	30	11	14	5	37	33	+4	47	
6	Loei City	30	12	9	9	50	40	+10	45	
7	Mahasarakham United	30	11	12	7	34	27	+7	45	
8	Kalasin	30	11	11	8	37	33	+4	44	
9	Sisaket United	30	12	7	11	49	32	+17	43	
10	Nakhon Phanom	30	8	11	11	37	38	−1	35	
11	Sakon Nakhon	30	9	5	16	39	62	−23	32	
12	Chaiyaphum United	30	6	11	13	31	36	−5	29	
13	Amnat Charoen Town	30	6	10	14	28	44	−16	28	
14	Yasothon United	30	7	7	16	26	45	−19	28	
15	Nong Bua Lamphu	30	4	12	14	21	49	−28	24	
16	Mukdahan City	30	5	4	21	24	73	−49	19	

Source: ^{[usurped]}
Rules for classification: 1) points; 2) head-to-head points; 3) head-to-head goal difference; 4) head-to-head goals scored; 5) goal difference; 6) number of goals scored.
(C) Champions; (Q) Qualified for the phase indicated
