= 2011 Regional League Division 2 North Eastern Region =

Regional League North-East Division
- Season: 2011

2011 Regional League Division 2 North-East Region is the 3rd season of the League competition since its establishment in 2009. It is in the third tier of the Thai football league system. The league winners and runners up will qualify for the 2011 Regional League Division 2 championship stage.

== Changes from last season ==
=== Team changes ===
==== Promoted clubs ====
Buriram were promoted to the 2011 Thai Division 1 League after winning the 2010 Regional League Division 2 championship pool.

==== Expansion clubs ====
Amnat Charoen Town joined the newly expanded league setup.

==== Serving bans ====
Ubon United are in the second year of their two-year ban.

== Stadium and locations ==
Locations of the 2011 Regional League North Eastern Teams

Team	Location	Stadium	Capacity	Ref.
Roi Et United	Roi Et	Roi Et Province Stadium	3,066	
Loei City	Loei	Loei Province Stadium	?	
Nakhon Ratchasima	Nakhon Ratchasima	80th Birthday Stadium	20,000	
Yasothon United	Yasothon	Yasothon Province Stadium	3,245	
Surin	Surin	Sri Narong Stadium	?	
Kalasin	Kalasin	Kalasin Province Stadium	5,000	
Nakhon Phanom	Nakhon Phanom	Nakhon Phanom Province Stadium	4,477	
Sakon Nakhon	Sakon Nakhon	Sakon Nakhon City municipality Stadium	3,449	
Udon Thani	Udon Thani	Institute of Physical Education Udon Thani Stadium	4,705	
Nong Khai FT	Nong Khai	Nong Khai POA. Stadium	4,500	
Ubon Tiger	Ubon Rachathani	Ubon Ratchathani University Stadium	2,945	
Mashare Chaiyaphum	Chaiyaphum	Chaiyaphum Province Stadium	1,957	
Mahasarakham United	Mahasarakham	IPE Mahasarakham Stadium	3,171	
Mukdahan City	Mukdahan	Mukdahan Province Stadium	?	
Nong Bua Lamphu	Nong Bua Lamphu	Nong Bua Lamphu Province Stadium	?	
Amnat Charoen Town	Amnat Charoen	Amnat Charoen municipal Stadium	2,500	

== Standings table ==
Pos	Team	Pld	W	D	L	GF	GA	GD	Pts	Qualification
1	Roi Et United (C, Q)	30	23	5	2	64	20	+44	74	Championship Pool
2	Loei City (Q)	30	21	4	5	67	27	+40	67	Championship Pool
3	Nakhon Ratchasima (Q)	30	20	9	1	67	21	+46	69	Championship Pool
4	Yasothon United	30	14	7	9	42	38	+4	49	
5	Nong Khai FT	30	12	11	7	44	36	+8	47	
6	Surin	30	12	9	9	35	32	+3	45	
7	Nakhon Phanom	30	12	7	11	45	41	+4	43	
8	Kalasin	30	10	10	10	46	38	+8	40	
9	Udon Thani	30	10	9	11	41	46	−5	39	
10	Sakon Nakhon	30	10	7	13	49	60	−11	37	
11	Mahasarakham United	30	4	15	11	21	30	−9	27	
12	Nong Bua Lamphu	30	6	6	18	34	65	−31	24	
13	Mukdahan City	30	4	10	16	26	47	−21	22	
14	Amnat Charoen Town	30	4	7	19	22	59	−37	19	
15	Ubon Tiger	30	3	9	18	30	64	−34	18	
16	Mashare Chaiyaphum	30	9	7	14	32	42	−10	14 (Note: Chaiyaphum United F.C.The club was docked 20 points in 2011 for fielding an ineligible player)	

Rules for classification: 1) points; 2) head-to-head points; 3) head-to-head goal difference; 4) head-to-head goals scored; 5) goal difference; 6) number of goals scored.
(C) Champions; (Q) Qualified for the phase indicated
