= 2012 Regional League Division 2 North Eastern Region =

Regional League North-East Division
- Season: 2012

2012 Regional League Division 2 North-East Region is the 4th season of the League competition since its establishment in 2009. It is in the third tier of the Thai football league system. The league winners and runners up will qualify for the 2012 Regional League Division 2 championship stage.

== Changes from last season ==
=== Team changes ===
==== Promoted clubs ====
- Nakhon Ratchasima were promoted to the 2012 Thai Division 1 League.

==== Expansion clubs ====
- Sisaket United joined the newly expanded league setup.

==== Returning clubs ====
- Ubon United is returning to the league after a 2-year break.

==== Withdrawn clubs ====
- Ubon United have withdrawn from the 2012 campaign.

==== Renamed clubs ====
- Ubon Tiger renamed Ubon Rachathani

== Stadium and locations ==
Locations of the Regional League North Eastern Teams

Team	Location	Stadium	Capacity	Ref.
Roi Et United	Roi Et	Roi Et Province Stadium	3,066	
Loei City	Loei	Loei Province Stadium	?	
Yasothon United	Yasothon	Yasothon Province Stadium	3,245	
Surin	Surin	Sri Narong Stadium	3,200	
Kalasin	Kalasin	Kalasin Province Stadium	5,000	
Nakhon Phanom	Nakhon Phanom	Nakhon Phanom Provincial Stadium	4,477	
Sakon Nakhon	Sakon Nakhon	Sakon Nakhon City municipality Stadium	3,449	
Udon Thani	Udon Thani	Institute of Physical Education Udon Thani Stadium	4,705	
Nong Khai FT	Nong Khai	Nong Khai Province Stadium	4,500	
Ubon Rachathani	Ubon Rachathani	Ubon Rachathani Sports School Stadium	2,945	
Mashare Chaiyaphum	Chaiyaphum	Chaiyaphum Province Stadium	1,957	
Mahasarakham United	Mahasarakham	Mahasarakham Rajabhat University Stadium	3,171	
Mukdahan City	Mukdahan	Mukdahan Province Stadium	5,000	
Nong Bua Lamphu	Nong Bua Lamphu	Nong Bua Lamphu Province Stadium	6,053	
Sisaket United	Sisaket	Sri Nakhon Lamduan Stadium	9,000	
Amnat Charoen Town	Amnat Charoen	Amnat Charoen municipal Stadium	2,500	

== League table ==
Pos	Team	Pld	W	D	L	GF	GA	GD	Pts	Qualification
1	Roi Et United (C, Q)	30	17	9	4	63	29	+34	60	Champions League Round
2	Sisaket United (Q)	30	18	5	7	60	33	+27	59	Champions League Round
3	Udon Thani	30	16	8	6	37	23	+14	56	
4	Loei City	30	15	9	6	51	28	+23	54	
5	Nakhon Phanom	30	14	9	7	56	41	+15	51	
6	Nong Khai FT	30	13	8	9	49	33	+16	47	
7	Yasothon United	30	12	10	8	36	19	+17	46	
8	Mahasarakham United	30	11	12	7	38	24	+14	45	
9	Amnat Charoen Town	30	12	6	12	38	44	−6	42	
10	Kalasin	30	11	8	11	45	39	+6	41	
11	Mashare Chaiyaphum	30	10	10	10	34	35	−1	40	
12	Nong Bua Lamphu	30	6	14	10	35	41	−6	32	
13	Surin	30	6	6	18	27	62	−35	24	
14	Sakon Nakhon	30	5	5	20	31	67	−36	20	
15	Mukdahan City	30	4	6	20	20	64	−44	18	
16	Ubon Rachathani	30	2	11	17	23	55	−32	17	

Rules for classification: 1) points; 2) head-to-head points; 3) head-to-head goal difference; 4) head-to-head goals scored; 5) goal difference; 6) number of goals scored.
(C) Champions; (Q) Qualified for the phase indicated
