= Eric Ayuk =

Cameroonian footballer (born 1997)

Personal information
- Full name: Eric Ayuk Mbu
- Date of birth: 17 February 1997 (age 29)
- Place of birth: Yaoundé, Cameroon
- Height: 1.70 m (5 ft 7 in)
- Position: Midfielder

Youth career
- 2012–2013: Buriram United

Senior career*
Years	Team	Apps	(Gls)
2014	Surin City	12	(3)
2014	Phichit	18	(7)
2015–2018	Philadelphia Union	29	(2)
2015	→ Harrisburg City Islanders (loan)	1	(1)
2016	→ Bethlehem Steel (loan)	17	(3)
2017	→ Jönköpings Södra IF (loan)	12	(1)
2018	→ Bethlehem Steel (loan)	4	(1)
2018–2021	Ankaraspor	71	(10)
2021–2022	Pharco	1	(0)
2023–2024	Adanaspor	16	(0)

International career^{‡}
2016–2017	Cameroon U20	3	(2)
2019	Cameroon U23	3	(1)
- * Club domestic league appearances and goals as of 11 May 2024 ‡ National team caps and goals as of 18 November 2020

Eric Ayuk Mbu (born February 17, 1997) is a Cameroonian footballer who plays as a winger.

== Club career ==
=== Youth ===
Ayuk played football while attending Lycée Bilingue de Yaoundé in his native Cameroon. In June 2012, he moved to Thailand as part of a program to introduce young Camaroonian players to a professional environment. Joining Buriram United of Thai Premier League and playing with its academy and reserve teams for the rest of 2012 and 2013.

=== Club ===
==== Surin City F.C. ====
Ayuk joined Surin City F.C., an affiliate of Buriram United at the start of its 2014 season in the 2014 Thai Division 2 League North Eastern Region, the third level of Thai football league system. His first game with the team was a qualifying game in the 2014 Thai League Cup – a 2–1 loss to Loei City F.C. on January 29, 2014. He made his league debut on February 16, 2014, in a 2–2 tie against Sisaket United F.C. His first goal was the game-winning goal on February 22, 2014, in a 1–0 win over Mahasarakham United F.C. He also scored against Nong Khai F.C. in a 2–2 draw on March 29, 2014, and another in a 4–1 win over Chaiyaphum United on April 26, 2014.

==== Phichit F.C. ====
On June 19, 2014, Ayuk joined Phichit F.C. in the 2014 Thai Division 2 League Northern Region. He made his debut on June 28, 2014, in a 3–2 win over Chiangrai F.C. Ayuk's first goal came in a 5–0 win over Tak F.C. on July 6, 2014. On August 11, 2014, Ayuk scored against Uttaradit F.C. in his team's 4–1 victory. He added another goal on August 30, 2014, in his team's 4–3 defeat to Phrae United F.C. On September 7, 2014, Ayuk had his first 2-goal game in a 7–0 victory over Phayao F.C. He also scored in his team's lone goal in a 2–1 loss to Nakhon Sawan F.C. on September 13, 2014. Ayuk's performances helped Phichit F.C. gain promotion to the Thai Division 1 League for the 2015 season after placing in 2nd place in its 2014 Regional League Division 2 Champions League group. During the group games, he scored in Phichit F.C.'s 4–0 Champions Leaguevictory over Hua Hin City F.C. on November 22, 2014.

==== Philadelphia Union ====
Ayuk was signed by Philadelphia Union on March 3, 2015, after a successful pre-season trial. He was signed on a free transfer. He scored his first goal in a 4–1 loss to Columbus Crew on April 25, 2015.

==== Bethlehem Steel FC ====
Ayuk was loaned to Philadelphia Union USL affiliate, Bethlehem Steel FC for the 2016 season. Ayuk would be a regular starter for Steel FC and scored the first home goal in the team's history against FC Cincinnati. he would go on to make 17 appearances and scored three goals during the season.

==== Jönköpings Södra IF ====
On April 4, it was announced that Ayuk had joined Swedish first division outfit Jönköpings Södra IF on loan for the rest of the 2017 Allsvenskan Season. He would make 12 league appearances and one cup appearance in Sweden, scoring one goal.

==== Return to Philadelphia ====
In December 2017, it was announced that the Union exercised Ayuk's 2018 contract option.

==== Ankaraspor ====
On 28 August 2018, Ayuk was transferred TFF First League side Ankaraspor (named "Osmanlıspor" at the time of transfer) for no fee but included a 15-percent sell-on fee for the Union. Ayuk became a regular starter for Ankaraspor, starting 27 of 29 appearances and scoring 5 goals during his first season.

=== Adanaspor ===
In July 2023, Ayuk signed for Adanaspor following a short spell with Egyptian Premier League club Pharco.

== International career ==
In April 2015, Ayuk was called into the Cameroon U-23 team for the 2015 CAF U-23 Championship but declined the call up to focus on his club career with the Philadelphia Union. In May 2016, Ayuk was called up for the Cameroon U-20 team for their 2017 Africa U-20 Cup of Nations qualifier versus Zimbabwe.

== Career statistics ==
=== Club ===
As of 18 November 2020

Club performance			League		Cup		Continental		Total	
Season	Club	League	Apps	Goals	Apps	Goals	Apps	Goals	Apps	Goals
2014	Surin City F.C.	Regional League Division 2	12	3	0	0	0	0	12	3
2014	Phichit F.C.	Regional League Division 2	18	7	0	0	0	0	18	7
2015	Philadelphia Union	MLS	28	2	4	1	0	0	32	3
2015	Harrisburg City Islanders (loan)	USL	1	0	0	0	0	0	1	0
2016	Philadelphia Union	MLS	1	0	0	0	0	0	1	0
2016	Bethlehem Steel FC (loan)	USL	17	3	0	0	0	0	17	3
2017	Jönköpings Södra IF (loan)	Allsvenskan	12	1	1	0	0	0	13	1
2018	Philadelphia Union	MLS	0	0	0	0	0	0	0	0
2018	Bethlehem Steel FC (loan)	USL	4	1	0	0	0	0	4	1
2018-19	Ankaraspor	TFF First League	29	5	2	0	0	0	31	5
2019-20	Ankaraspor	TFF First League	32	3	0	0	0	0	32	3
2020-21	Ankaraspor	TFF First League	1	0	0	0	0	0	1	0
Career Total			155	25	7	1	0	0	162	26
