= 2017 Thai League 4 Northeastern Region =

Thai League 4 Northeastern Region
- Season: 2017
- Champions: Sisaket United
- Relegated: Mukdahan Chaiyuenyong
- Matches: 198
- Goals: 574 (2.9 per match)
- Top goalscorer: Abass Ouro-nimini (23 Goals)
- Biggest home win: Buriram United B 7–0 Huai Thalaeng United (19 August 2017); Muang Loei United 7–1 Mahasarakham (9 September 2017)
- Biggest away win: Mahasarakham 1–4 Loei City R-Airlines (25 February 2017); Mukdahan Chaiyuenyong 0–4 Huai Thalaeng United (23 August 2017)
- Highest scoring: Mukdahan Chaiyuenyong 6–3 Sakon Nakhon (6 August 2017)
- Longest winning run: 8 matches Mashare Chaiyaphum
- Longest unbeaten run: 20 matches Sisaket United
- Longest losing run: 5 matches Mukdahan Chaiyuenyong
- Highest attendance: 1,200; Mukdahan Chaiyuenyong 1–1 Huai Thalaeng United (1 April 2017); Mukdahan Chaiyuenyong 2–3 Buriram United B (10 May 2017); Yasothon 0–1 Buriram United B (2 July 2017)
- Lowest attendance: 25; Loei City R-Airlines 2–2 Surin City (26 August 2017)
- Total attendance: 65,667
- Average attendance: 335

2017 Thai League 4 Northeastern Region is the 9th season of the League competition since its establishment in 2009. It is in the 4th tier of the Thai football league system.

== Changes from last season ==
=== Team changes ===
==== Promoted clubs ====
Five club was promoted to the 2017 Thai League 3 Upper Region.

- Udon Thani
- Ubon Ratchathani
- Kalasin
- Khon Kaen
- Amnat United

==== Relegated clubs ====
- Nakhon Phanom Relegated to 2016 Thai Division 3 Tournament Northeastern Region

==== Relocated clubs ====
- Loei City R-Airlines were moved from the Northern Region 2016
- Mashare Chaiyaphum were moved from the Central Region 2016
- Pattaya City were moved from the Eastern Region 2016

==== Expansion clubs ====
- Wang Saphung Promoted from the 2016 Thai Division 3 Tournament Northeastern Region

==== Renamed clubs ====
- Mukdahan Lamkhong was renamed to Mukdahan Chaiyuenyong
- Wang Saphung was renamed to Muang Loei United
- Nakhon Ratchasima Huai Thalaeng United authorize from Pattaya City

==== Withdrawn clubs ====
- Nong Khai is taking a 1-year break.

==== Reserving clubs ====
- Buriram United B is Buriram United Reserving this team which join Northeastern Region first time.

== Teams ==
=== Stadium and locations ===
Locations of the 2017 Thai League 4 Northeastern Region Teams

Team	Province	Stadium	Capacity	Ref.
Buriram United B	Buriram	Khao Kradong Stadium	14,000	
Nakhon Ratchasima Huai Thalaeng United	Nakhon Ratchasima	80th Birthday Stadium Suranaree University of Technology Stadium	28,000 ?	
Loei City	Loei	Loei Riverside Stadium	3,628	
Mahasarakham	Maha Sarakham	Mahasarakham Province Stadium	3,171	
Mashare Chaiyaphum	Chaiyaphum	Chaiyaphum Province Stadium	2,564	
Muang Loei United	Loei	Wang Saphung District Stadium	???	
Mukdahan Chaiyuenyong	Mukdahan	Nikhom Kham Soi District Stadium (Kok Daeng)	5,000	
Roi Et United	Roi Et	Pankkee Arena	3,066	
Sakon Nakhon	Sakon Nakhon	Sakon Nakhon SAT Stadium (Sakon Nakhon Province Stadium)	?	
Sisaket United	Sisaket	Sri Nakhon Lamduan Stadium	9,000	
Surin City	Surin	Sri Narong Stadium	5,670	
Yasothon	Yasothon	Yasothon PAO. Stadium	2,500	

== League table ==
Pos	Team	Pld	W	D	L	GF	GA	GD	Pts	Qualification or relegation
1	Sisaket United (C, Q)	33	21	6	6	59	31	+28	69	Qualification to the Thai League 4 Champions League
2	Mashare Chaiyaphum (Q)	33	20	7	6	65	41	+24	67	Qualification to the Thai League 4 Champions League
3	Muang Loei United (Q)	33	14	12	7	46	30	+16	54	Qualification to the Thai League 4 Champions League
4	Surin City	33	13	8	12	47	44	+3	47 (Note: Surin City ahead on head-to-head record; Surin City 7 pts, Sakon Nakhon 1 pt.)	
5	Sakon Nakhon	33	14	5	14	45	43	+2	47	
6	Buriram United B (Note: Buriram United B was docked 3 points due to decision of FA Thailand about rule breaking of U-21 players.)	33	14	7	12	55	39	+16	46	
7	Mahasarakham	33	12	8	13	52	67	−15	44	
8	Huai Thalaeng United	33	10	7	16	44	64	−20	37 (Note: Huai Thalaeng United ahead on head-to-head record; Huai Thalaeng United 7 pts, Yasothon 1 pt.)	
9	Yasothon	33	9	10	14	46	43	+3	37	
10	Roi Et United	33	8	10	15	45	48	−3	34	
11	Loei City	33	7	10	16	47	70	−23	31	
12	Mukdahan Chaiyuenyong (R)	33	7	8	18	45	76	−31	29	Relegation to the 2018 Thailand Amateur League

Updated to match(es) played on 20 October 2017. Source: Thai League 4
Rules for classification: 1) Points; 2) Head-to-head points; 3) Head-to-head goals difference; 4) Head-to-head goals scored; 5) Overall goals difference; 6) Overall goals scored; 7) Fair play points; 8) Play-off without extra time;).
(C) Champions; (Q) Qualified for the phase indicated; (R) Relegated

== Results 1st and 2nd match for each team ==
Home \ Away	BRUB	HTU	LOE	MAH	MCH	MLU	MUK	ROI	SKN	SKU	SUR	YAS
Buriram United B		2–0	4–1	1–4	0–2	1–1	1–0	1–1	1–2	0–2	1–0	0–1
Huai Thalaeng United	1–2		0–0	3–2	1–2	2–0	1–2	2–1	0–0	0–3	0–2	2–1
Loei City	1–3	3–1		3–3	0–3	0–0	1–0	2–1	0–2	0–1	2–1	2–2
Mahasarakham	1–0	3–0	2–2		3–4	1–4	1–1	0–0	0–2	2–3	2–0	2–0
Mashare Chaiyaphum	1–1	1–3	2–2	4–2		1–2	2–0	2–0	2–0	0–1	0–1	0–3
Muang Loei United	1–1	0–0	3–1	2–3	0–1		3–3	0–0	0–1	1–1	2–2	1–0
Mukdahan Chaiyuenyong	2–3	1–1	2–2	0–1	3–2	0–3		1–1	4–1	0–2	2–4	1–1
Roi Et United	0–0	2–2	5–0	0–1	2–2	0–1	4–0		1–3	0–2	5–2	0–0
Sakon Nakhon	0–1	4–1	2–1	3–0	0–0	0–0	2–1	1–2		0–1	0–1	1–2
Sisaket United	1–1	3–0	1–0	2–2	0–2	1–1	5–2	2–0	3–0		2–0	2–1
Surin City	2–0	0–1	2–3	4–1	3–3	0–1	2–2	2–0	0–0	1–2		2–1
Yasothon	0–1	2–2	1–1	6–1	1–2	1–1	5–1	1–0	1–0	0–0	0–0	

Updated to match(es) played on 16 July 2017. Source: Thai League 4
Legend: Blue = home team win; Yellow = draw; Red = away team win.

== Results 3rd match for each team ==
In the third leg, the winner on head-to-head result of the first and the second leg will be home team. If head-to-head result are tie, must to find the home team from head-to-head goals different. If all of head-to-head still tie, must to find the home team from penalty kickoff on the end of each second leg match (This penalty kickoff don't bring to calculate points on league table, it's only the process to find the home team on third leg).

Home \ Away	BRUB	HTU	LOE	MAH	MCH	MLU	MUK	ROI	SKN	SKU	SUR	YAS
Buriram United B		7–0	4–2			0–1	6–0					
Huai Thalaeng United					1–2	3–2		2–4				2–1
Loei City		2–3		1–2			3–1				2–2	
Mahasarakham	2–1	1–0						3–3				
Mashare Chaiyaphum	3–2		4–3	2–2			3–0	2–0	2–2	1–0		
Muang Loei United			2–0	7–1	0–2		3–1	1–0		0–0	1–0	0–2
Mukdahan Chaiyuenyong		0–4		1–1					6–3			
Roi Et United	3–2		3–3				1–2				0–1	
Sakon Nakhon	2–4	4–2	2–0	2–0		1–2		2–1				
Sisaket United	0–3	4–3	5–0	1–2			3–2	1–2	2–1		1–3	2–1
Surin City	1–1	1–1		2–1	1–3		0–2		1–0			4–2
Yasothon	1–0		2–2	1–1	2–3		1–2	2–3	1–2			

Updated to match(es) played on 9 September 2017. Source: Thai League 4
Legend: Blue = home team win; Yellow = draw; Red = away team win.

== Season statistics ==
=== Top scorers ===
As of 9 September 2017.

Rank	Player	Club	Goals
1	(Nigeria) Abass Ouro-nimini	Mukdahan Chaiyuenyong	23
2	(Thailand) Chatri Rattanawong	Sisaket United	20
3	(Thailand) Rewat Yothapakdee	Mahasarakham	17
4	(Ghana) Kelvin Amdonsah	Mashare Chaiyaphum	15
5	(Ghana) Joseph Quasi Amponsah	Mashare Chaiyaphum	14
5	(Thailand) Pakkawat Phunachiang	Roi Et United	14
7	(Thailand) Phanupong Intachomphu	Sisaket United	13
7	(Thailand) Warut Trongkratok	Nakhon Ratchasima Huai Thalaeng United	13
7	(Thailand) Ittipol Pol-ard	Mashare Chaiyaphum	13
10	(Thailand) Decha Sirifong	Sakon Nakhon	12

== Attendance ==
Pos	Team	Total	High	Low	Average	Change
1	Mukdahan Chaiyuenyong	9,369	1,200	202	780	n/a
2	Muang Loei United	9,657	1,010	214	536	n/a
3	Yasothon	9,121	1,200	100	506	n/a
4	Roi Et United	7,506	923	131	500	n/a
5	Surin City	6,349	860	116	352	n/a
6	Mashare Chaiyaphum	5,362	770	111	297	n/a
7	Mahasarakham	4,071	505	56	271	n/a
9	Huai Thalaeng United	3,050	340	107	203	n/a
8	Sisaket United	3,870	403	110	193	n/a
10	Loei City	2,542	350	25	169	n/a
11	Buriram United B	2,330	352	28	155	n/a
12	Sakon Nakhon	1,863	269	36	109	n/a
	League total	65,667	1,200	25	335	n/a

Updated to games played on 9 September 2017
Source: Thai League 4

== See also ==
- 2017 Thai League
- 2017 Thai League 2
- 2017 Thai League 3
- 2017 Thai League 4
- 2017 Thailand Amateur League
- 2017 Thai FA Cup
- 2017 Thai League Cup
- 2017 Thailand Champions Cup
