= 2014 Regional League Division 2 North Eastern Region =

Regional League North-East Region
- Season: 2014
- Champions: Ubon UMT
- Top goalscorer: Elvis Job (25 goals)

2014 Regional League Division 2 North Eastern Region is the 6th season of the League competition since its establishment in 2009. It is in the third tier of the Thai football league system. The league winners and runners up will qualify for the 2014 Regional League Division 2 championship stage.

== Changes from last season ==
=== Team changes ===
==== Promoted clubs ====
Roi Et United were promoted to the 2014 Thai Division 1 League.

==== Withdrawn clubs ====
Yasothon United have withdrawn from the 2014 campaign.

==== Renamed clubs ====
- Amnat Poly United renamed Amnat Charoen Town.

== Stadium and locations ==
Locations of the 2014 Regional League North Eastern Teams

Team	Location	Stadium	Capacity	Ref.
Loei City	Loei	Loei Riverside Stadium	?	
Surin City	Surin	Sri Narong Stadium	?	
Kalasin	Kalasin	Kalasin Province Stadium	2,580	
Nakhon Phanom	Nakhon Phanom	SAT Nakhon Phanom Stadium (Nongyat)	4,477	
Sakon Nakhon	Sakon Nakhon	Sakon Nakhon City municipality Stadium	3,449	
Udon Thani	Udon Thani	Institute Of Physical Education Udon Thani Stadium	3,500	
Nong Khai FT	Nong Khai	Nong Khai Province Stadium	4,500	
Ubon UMT	Ubon Rachathani	Ubon Rachathani Sports School Stadium	2,945	
Chaiyaphum United	Chaiyaphum	IPE Chaiyaphum Stadium	1,957	
Mahasarakham United	Mahasarakham	IPE Mahasarakham Stadium	3,171	
Mukdahan City	Mukdahan	Mukdahan Province Stadium	5,000	
Nong Bua Lamphu	Nong Bua Lamphu	Nong Bua Lamphu Province Stadium	6,053	
Sisaket United	Sisaket	Sri Nakhon Lamduan Stadium	9,000	
Amnat Poly United	Amnat Charoen	Amnat Charoen Province Stadium	2,500	

== League table ==
Pos	Team	Pld	W	D	L	GF	GA	GD	Pts	Qualification
1	Ubon UMT (C, Q)	26	19	5	2	84	23	+61	62	Champions League Round
2	Udon Thani (Q)	26	15	5	6	35	16	+19	50	Champions League Round
3	Loei City	26	12	9	5	45	22	+23	45	
4	Surin City	26	11	8	7	43	29	+14	41	
5	Mahasarakham United	26	11	6	9	29	31	−2	39	
6	Kalasin	26	9	11	6	31	28	+3	38	
7	Nong Khai FT	26	9	8	9	34	32	+2	35	
8	Amnat Poly United	26	8	10	8	27	34	−7	34	
9	Chaiyaphum United	26	9	7	10	28	36	−8	34	
10	Nakhon Phanom	26	10	4	12	31	49	−18	34	
11	Sisaket United	26	8	7	11	38	35	+3	31	
12	Nong Bua Lamphu	26	6	11	9	21	30	−9	29	
13	Sakon Nakhon	26	3	6	17	20	52	−32	15	
14	Mukdahan City	26	1	5	20	15	64	−49	8	

Source: ^{[usurped]}
Rules for classification: 1) points; 2) head-to-head points; 3) head-to-head goal difference; 4) head-to-head goals scored; 5) goal difference; 6) number of goals scored.
(C) Champions; (Q) Qualified for the phase indicated
