= 2019 Thai League 4 Northeastern Region =

Thai League 4 Northeastern Region
- Season: 2019
- Dates: 9 February 2019 – 1 September 2019
- Champions: Muang Loei United
- Relegated: Kalasin
- T4 Champions League: Muang Loei United; Huai Thalaeng United
- Matches played: 156
- Goals scored: 443 (2.84 per match)
- Top goalscorer: (Thailand) Thanapol Srithong (20 goals; Khon Kaen Mordindang)
- Biggest home win: 8 goals difference Khon Kaen Mordindang 8–0 Kalasin (29 June 2019)
- Biggest away win: 6 goals difference Kalasin 0–6 Muang Loei United (5 April 2019); Yasothon 0–6 Muang Loei United (1 June 2019)
- Highest scoring: 8 goals Khon Kaen Mordindang 8–0 Kalasin (29 June 2019); Sisaket United 5–3 Huai Thalaeng United (11 August 2019)
- Longest winning run: 9 matches Muang Loei United
- Longest unbeaten run: 12 matches Buriram United (B)
- Longest winless run: 17 matches Nongbua Pitchaya (B)
- Longest losing run: 4 matches Sisaket United; Yasothon
- Highest attendance: 1,650; Yasothon 1–1 Nongbua Pitchaya (B) (10 March 2019)
- Lowest attendance: 1 Sakon Nakhon 0–1 Sisaket United (17 February 2019)
- Total attendance: 41,770
- Average attendance: 273

The 2019 Thai League 4 Northeastern region is a region in the regional stage of the 2019 Thai League 4. A total of 13 teams located in Northeastern of Thailand will compete in the league of the Northeastern region.

== Teams ==
=== Number of teams by province ===
Position	Province	Number	Teams
1	Surin	2	Surin City and Surin Sugar Khong Chee Mool
2	Buriram	1	Buriram United (B)
2	Chaiyaphum	1	Mashare Chaiyaphum
2	Kalasin	1	Kalasin
2	Khon Kaen	1	Khon Kaen Mordindang
2	Loei	1	Muang Loei United
2	Maha Sarakham	1	Mahasarakham
2	Nakhon Ratchasima	1	Huai Thalaeng United
2	Nong Bua Lamphu	1	Nongbua Pitchaya (B)
2	Sakon Nakhon	1	Sakon Nakhon
2	Sisaket	1	Sisaket United
2	Yasothon	1	Yasothon

=== Stadiums and locations ===
Locations of the 2019 Thai League 4 Northeastern region teams

Team	Location	Stadium	Coordinates
Buriram United (B)	Buriram (Mueang)	Chang Arena	14°57′57″N 103°05′40″E
Huai Thalaeng United	Nakhon Ratchasima (Mueang)	Suranaree University of Technology Stadium	14°53′16″N 102°01′01″E
Kalasin	Kalasin (Mueang)	Kalasin Provincial Stadium	16°25′02″N 103°31′13″E
Khon Kaen Mordindang	Khon Kaen (Mueang)	Khon Kaen University Stadium	16°28′36″N 102°49′04″E
Mahasarakham	Mahasarakham (Mueang)	Mahasarakham Rajabhat University Stadium^{9/2/2019–17/2/2019}	16°11′55″N 103°16′25″E
Mahasarakham	Mahasarakham (Mueang)	Mahasarakham Provincial Stadium^{10/3/2019–}	16°09′15″N 103°18′59″E
Mashare Chaiyaphum	Chaiyaphum (Mueang)	Chaiyaphum Provincial Stadium	15°48′28″N 102°01′16″E
Muang Loei United	Loei (Wang Saphung)	Wang Saphung Stadium	17°18′22″N 101°46′14″E
Nongbua Pitchaya (B)	Nongbua Lamphu (Mueang)	Nongbua Lamphu Provincial Stadium	17°07′48″N 102°25′26″E
Sakon Nakhon	Sakon Nakhon (Mueang)	Sakon Nakhon Provincial Stadium	17°12′04″N 104°06′22″E
Sisaket United	Sisaket (Mueang)	Sri Nakhon Lamduan Stadium	15°06′04″N 104°20′25″E
Surin City	Surin (Mueang)	Sri Narong Stadium	14°52′30″N 103°29′50″E
Surin Sugar Khong Chee Mool	Surin (Mueang)	Rajamangala University of Technology Isan Surin Campus Stadium	14°51′15″N 103°28′53″E
Yasothon	Yasothon (Mueang)	Yasothon PAO. Stadium	15°46′58″N 104°09′06″E

== League table ==
=== Standings ===
Pos	Team	Pld	W	D	L	GF	GA	GD	Pts	Qualification or relegation
1	Muang Loei United (Q)	24	17	4	3	55	15	+40	55	Qualification to the Champions League stage
2	Huai Thalaeng United (Q)	24	12	6	6	41	33	+8	42	Qualification to the Champions League stage
3	Sisaket United	24	11	5	8	31	33	−2	38	
4	Khon Kaen Mordindang	24	9	10	5	49	33	+16	37 (Note: Khon Kaen Mordindang ahead on head-to-head record; Khon Kaen Mordindang 4 pts, Buriram United (B) 1 pt.)	
5	Buriram United (B)	24	9	10	5	35	35	0	37	
6	Surin Sugar Khong Chee Mool	24	7	11	6	33	27	+6	32	
7	Surin City	24	7	10	7	39	34	+5	31	
8	Sakon Nakhon	24	7	8	9	39	44	−5	29	
9	Mashare Chaiyaphum	24	6	10	8	25	33	−8	28	
10	Nongbua Pitchaya (B)	24	5	8	11	24	33	−9	23	
11	Yasothon	24	4	9	11	28	43	−15	21 (Note: Yasothon ahead on head-to-head record; Yasothon 4 pts, Mahasarakham 1 pt.)	
12	Mahasarakham	24	4	9	11	18	29	−11	21	
13	Kalasin (R)	24	4	8	12	26	51	−25	20	Relegation to the 2020 Thailand Amateur League

Source: Thai League
Rules for classification: 1) Points; 2) Head-to-head points; 3) Head-to-head goal difference; 4) Head-to-head goal scored; 5) Overall goal difference; 6) Overall goal scored; 7) Fair play points; 8) Play-off without extra time).
(Q) Qualified for the phase indicated; (R) Relegated

=== Positions by round ===
Qualification to the Champions League stage
Relegation to the 2020 Thailand Amateur League

Team ╲ Round	1	2	3	4	5	6	7	8	9	10	11	12	13	14	15	16	17	18	19	20	21	22	23	24	25	26
Muang Loei United	2	1	3	2	1	1	1	1	1	1	1	1	1	1	1	1	1	1	1	1	1	1	1	1	1	1
Huai Thalaeng United	1	2	1	3	2	2	2	2	3	3	3	3	3	3	3	3	3	2	2	2	2	2	2	2	2	2
Sisaket United	6	5	5	8	11	11	9	7	7	7	7	6	4	4	4	4	4	4	4	4	4	4	4	4	3	3
Khon Kaen Mordindang	3	3	4	5	4	4	3	4	2	2	2	2	2	2	2	2	2	3	3	3	3	3	3	3	4	4
Buriram United (B)	12	13*	9	9	9	6	6	8	10	9	11	8	8	8	6	5	5	6	6	6	5	5	5	5	5	5
Surin Sugar Khong Chee Mool	4	4	2	1	3	3	4	5	5	5	4	4	6	5	5	6	6	5	5	5	6	6	6	7	6	6
Surin City	7	8	10	10	6	7	5	3	4	4	5	7	5	6	7	7	7	8	8	8	9	9	9	8	8	7
Sakon Nakhon	13	12	13	13	13	13	11	12	11	11	10	11	10	10	10	11	11	11	9	9	8	7	8	6	7	8
Mashare Chaiyaphum	9	11	7	11	7	8	8	6	6	6	6	5	7	7	8	8	8	7	7	7	7	8	7	9	9	9
Nongbua Pitchaya (B)	5	6	8	6	8	9	10	11	12	12	13*	13*	13*	12	12	12	12	12	12	13*	13*	13*	11	13*	11	10
Yasothon	8	9	11	12	12	12	13	10	8	8	9	10	11	11	11	10	10	10	11	11	11	11	12	11	10	11
Mahasarakham	11	7	6	4	5	5	7	9	9	10	8	9	9	9	9	9	9	9	10	10	10	10	10	10	12	12
Kalasin	10	10	12	7	10	10	12	13	13	13	12	12	12	13	13	13	13	13	13	12	12	12	13	12	13	13

Source: Thai League

Notes:
* The reserve of T1 and T2 teams, also known as team (B) could not qualified and relegated, so that the teams in lower or upper positions would be qualified or relegated.

=== Results by round ===
Team ╲ Round	1	2	3	4	5	6	7	8	9	10	11	12	13	14	15	16	17	18	19	20	21	22	23	24	25	26
Muang Loei United	W	W	N	W	W	W	W	W	W	W	L	W	W	L	N	W	W	D	W	D	W	D	W	L	D	W
Huai Thalaeng United	W	W	W	N	D	W	L	D	D	L	W	D	W	D	W	N	W	W	W	D	L	L	L	W	W	L
Sisaket United	D	W	L	L	L	L	W	W	L	W	N	W	W	W	D	W	D	D	D	W	L	W	N	L	W	L
Khon Kaen Mordindang	W	D	D	L	W	D	W	L	W	N	W	D	W	W	D	W	D	D	W	D	L	N	L	L	D	D
Buriram United (B)	L	L	W	D	D	W	D	N	L	D	L	W	L	W	W	W	D	D	D	N	W	D	D	W	D	W
Surin Sugar Khong Chee Mool	W	D	W	W	L	D	L	D	N	D	W	L	D	W	D	L	L	W	D	D	N	D	D	L	W	D
Surin City	D	N	D	D	W	D	W	W	D	D	L	L	W	N	L	L	D	D	L	L	D	W	D	W	L	W
Sakon Nakhon	L	L	D	L	D	N	W	L	D	D	W	L	D	L	D	D	D	N	W	W	W	W	L	W	L	L
Mashare Chaiyaphum	L	L	W	L	W	D	D	W	D	D	L	W	N	D	D	L	D	W	D	L	D	D	W	L	N	L
Nongbua Pitchaya (B)	W	L	L	D	D	L	N	L	L	D	L	D	L	D	D	L	L	D	N	L	W	D	W	L	W	W
Yasothon	N	D	L	D	L	D	L	W	W	D	D	L	L	L	L	W	D	L	L	D	L	L	D	W	D	N
Mahasarakham	L	W	D	W	L	D	L	L	D	L	W	N	L	D	W	L	D	L	L	D	L	D	D	N	L	D
Kalasin	L	D	L	W	N	L	L	L	D	D	D	D	L	L	L	D	N	L	L	W	W	L	D	W	L	D

N = No match; W = Won; D = Drawn; L = Lost

=== Results ===
For the Northeastern region, a total 24 matches per team competing in 2 legs.

Home \ Away	BRU	HTU	KLS	KKM	MSK	MCP	MLU	NBP	SNK	SKU	SRC	KCM	YST
Buriram United (B)	—	2–0	1–0	1–3	1–2	1–1	1–0	3–3	1–1	2–1	1–1	2–1	1–2
Huai Thalaeng United	5–1	—	2–0	3–1	1–0	1–1	1–0	1–0	0–2	0–1	3–1	0–0	4–3
Kalasin	1–2	2–3	—	0–0	4–1	2–3	0–6	2–1	2–2	0–2	1–1	1–1	1–1
Khon Kaen Mordindang	3–3	2–2	8–0	—	1–1	0–2	1–1	5–1	1–1	2–2	1–1	1–0	2–0
Mahasarakham	0–0	0–2	0–0	1–3	—	1–2	0–0	2–1	1–2	2–0	2–1	2–3	0–0
Mashare Chaiyaphum	0–0	1–2	0–3	1–2	0–0	—	0–2	0–2	2–1	0–0	1–1	2–2	1–0
Muang Loei United	3–1	3–0	4–0	1–0	2–1	2–0	—	1–0	4–0	2–0	3–1	2–1	3–3
Nongbua Pitchaya (B)	1–1	0–0	2–2	1–0	0–0	1–0	0–0	—	4–3	0–1	3–2	1–2	0–1
Sakon Nakhon	2–2	2–2	1–2	2–2	2–0	5–2	1–5	1–0	—	0–1	2–1	2–2	4–2
Sisaket United	2–2	5–3	3–0	1–5	1–0	1–2	0–2	2–1	1–0	—	2–2	1–0	1–0
Surin City	0–1	3–2	3–1	2–2	0–0	2–2	4–1	2–0	2–1	5–1	—	0–1	2–1
Surin Sugar Khong Chee Mool	2–3	1–1	3–1	4–1	0–0	1–1	0–2	1–1	3–0	1–1	2–2	—	2–0
Yasothon	1–2	2–3	1–1	2–3	3–2	1–1	0–6	1–1	2–2	2–1	0–0	0–0	—

Source: Thai League
Legend: Blue = home team win; Yellow = draw; Red = away team win.
For upcoming matches, an "a" indicates there is an article about the rivalry between the two participants.

== Season statistics ==
=== Top scorers by team ===
Position	Teams	Name	Goals
1	Khon Kaen Mordindang	(Thailand) Thanapol Srithong	20
2	Huai Thalaeng United	(Senegal) Aliou Seck	14
3	Muang Loei United	(Thailand) Witthaya Thanawatcharasanti	13
3	Sakon Nakhon	(Thailand) Niyom Coomchompoo	13
3	Surin City	(Thailand) Watthanapon Chinthong	13
6	Mashare Chaiyaphum	(Thailand) Ittipol Polarj	9
7	Buriram United (B)	(Thailand) Apidet Janngam	8
7	Buriram United (B)	(Thailand) Phongchana Kongkirit	8
9	Kalasin	(Thailand) Rashanon Ragsa-ad	7
9	Surin Sugar Khong Chee Mool	(Japan) Miyake Kyohei	7
11	Nongbua Pitchaya (B)	(Thailand) Chawin Thirawatsri	5
11	Nongbua Pitchaya (B)	(Thailand) Thaweerak Donprap	5
11	Yasothon	(Guinea) Diop Badara Aly	5
14	Mahasarakham	(Thailand) Nitipong Ruangsa	4
14	Sisaket United	(Thailand) Phattharapong Phengchaem	4

== Attendance ==
=== Overall statistics ===
Pos	Team	Total	High	Low	Average	Change
1	Yasothon	7,958	1,650	60	663	−45.0%
2	Surin City	6,567	1,250	250	597	−15.6%
3	Khon Kaen Mordindang	6,037	737	319	503	n/a
4	Muang Loei United	3,973	483	3	331	−38.9%
5	Mahasarakham	3,098	560	79	258	−8.8%
6	Huai Thalaeng United	2,690	436	57	224	+173.2%
7	Sakon Nakhon	2,220	550	1	185	+37.0%
8	Mashare Chaiyaphum	2,135	300	107	178	−21.6%
9	Buriram United (B)	1,741	236	59	145	+40.8%
10	Kalasin	1,728	288	70	144	−33.9%
11	Nongbua Pitchaya (B)	1,238	140	67	113	−45.9%
12	Surin Sugar Khong Chee Mool	1,231	185	56	112	−45.6%
13	Sisaket United	1,154	180	54	96	−13.5%
	League total	41,770	1,650	1	273	−52.0%

Updated to games played on 1 September 2019
Source: Thai League

=== Attendance by home match played ===
Team \ Match played	1	2	3	4	5	6	7	8	9	10	11	12	Total
Buriram United (B)	195	174	236	168	110	122	157	78	123	118	59	201	1,741
Huai Thalaeng United	374	436	220	178	174	325	150	57	136	69	187	384	2,690
Kalasin	235	288	88	88	91	94	121	70	108	216	70	259	1,728
Khon Kaen Mordindang	737	417	589	612	489	559	353	512	571	392	319	487	6,037
Mahasarakham	560	350	79	150	150	200	310	250	213	170	214	452	3,098
Mashare Chaiyaphum	120	155	175	107	168	157	200	180	148	200	300	225	2,135
Muang Loei United	3	330	300	420	427	350	400	290	432	138	483	400	3,973
Nongbua Pitchaya (B)	50	67	120	129	75	Unk.2	105	126	199	128	99	140	1,238
Sakon Nakhon	1	200	165	110	550	300	105	83	63	162	81	400	2,220
Sisaket United	180	150	112	75	74	73	83	93	102	70	85	54	1,154
Surin City	560	494	545	Unk.1	895	352	1,250	775	450	453	543	250	6,567
Surin Sugar Khong Chee Mool	161	110	85	56	Unk.3	85	74	87	79	250	185	59	1,231
Yasothon	1,500	1,650	280	1,050	347	60	800	200	450	650	850	121	7,958

Source: Thai League
Note:
Unk.1 Some error of T4 official match report 20 April 2019 (Surin City 2–1 Sakon Nakhon).
Unk.2 Some error of T4 official match report 25 May 2019 (Nongbua Pitchaya (B) 2–2 Kalasin).
Unk.3 Some error of T4 official match report 25 May 2019 (Surin Sugar Khong Chee Mool 2–3 Buriram United (B)).

== See also ==
- 2019 Thai League 1
- 2019 Thai League 2
- 2019 Thai League 3
- 2019 Thai League 4
- 2019 Thailand Amateur League
- 2019 Thai FA Cup
- 2019 Thai League Cup
- 2019 Thailand Champions Cup
