= 2018 Thai League 4 Northeastern Region =

Thai League 4 Northeastern Region
- Season: 2018
- Champions: Muang Loei United
- Relegated: Loei City
- Matches: 182
- Goals: 457 (2.51 per match)
- Top goalscorer: (Thailand) Chawin Thirawatsri (17 goals)
- Biggest home win: Khonkaen United 11–2 Surin Sugar Khong Chee Mool (19 August 2018)
- Biggest away win: Ubon UMT United U-23 1–6 Muang Loei United (15 July 2018)
- Highest scoring: 13 goals Khonkaen United 11–2 Surin Sugar Khong Chee Mool (19 August 2018)
- Longest winning run: 9 matches Khonkaen United
- Longest unbeaten run: 13 matches Surin City
- Longest losing run: 10 matches Ubon UMT United U-23
- Highest attendance: 5,386; Khonkaen United 3–1 Muang Loei United (11 August 2018)
- Lowest attendance: 24; Huai Thalaeng United 1–3 Sakon Nakhon (1 August 2018)
- Total attendance: 101,770
- Average attendance: 569

2018 Thai League 4 Northeastern Region is the 10th season of the League competition since its establishment in 2009. It is in the 4th tier of the Thai football league system.

== Changes from Last Season ==
=== Promoted Clubs ===
Promoted from the 2017 Thailand Amateur League Northeastern Region

- Surin Sugar Khong Chee Mool

=== Relegated Clubs ===
Relegated to the 2018 Thailand Amateur League Northeastern Region

- Mukdahan Chaiyuenyong

=== Expansion Clubs ===
- Roi Et United couldn't pay late performing fee. it cause to don't pass Club-licensing football club. This team is banned 2 years and Relegated to 2020 Thailand Amateur League Northeastern Region.

=== Renamed Clubs ===
- Buriram United B was renamed to Buriram United U-23
- Khong Chee Mool was renamed to Surin Sugar Khong Chee Mool

=== Reserving Clubs ===
- Nongbua Pitchaya U-23 is Nongbua Pitchaya Reserving this team which join Northeastern Region first time.
- Ubon UMT United U-23 is Ubon UMT United Reserving this team which join Northeastern Region first time.

=== Returned Clubs ===
- Khon Kaen United was returned to play thailand professional league because This team is acquitted from Thailand Court of justice decide. FA Thailand order this team to restart at 2018 Thai League 4 Northeastern Region.,

== Teams ==
=== Stadium and locations ===
Locations of the 2018 Thai League 4 Northeastern Region Teams

Team	Province	Stadium	Capacity	Ref.
Buriram United U-23	Buriram	Khao Kradong Stadium	14,000	
Huai Thalaeng United	Nakhon Ratchasima	Suranaree University of Technology Stadium	???	
Khonkaen United	Khonkaen	Khonkaen PAO. Stadium	7,000	
Loei City	Loei	Loei Riverside Stadium	3,628	
Mahasarakham	Maha Sarakham	Mahasarakham Province Stadium	3,171	
Mashare Chaiyaphum	Chaiyaphum	Chaiyaphum Province Stadium	2,564	
Muang Loei United	Loei	Wang Saphung District Stadium	???	
Nongbua Pitchaya U-23	Nongbua Lamphu	Nongbua Lamphu Provincial Stadium	4,333	
Sakon Nakhon	Sakon Nakhon	Sakon Nakhon SAT Stadium (Sakon Nakhon Province Stadium)	2,000	
Sisaket United	Sisaket	Sri Nakhon Lamduan Stadium	9,000	
Surin City	Surin	Sri Narong Stadium	5,670	
Surin Sugar Khong Chee Mool	Surin	Rajamangala University of Technology Isan, Surin Campus stadium	?	
Ubon UMT United U-23	Ubon Ratchathani	UMT Stadium	6,000	
Yasothon	Yasothon	Yasothon PAO. Stadium	2,500	

== League table ==
Pos	Team	Pld	W	D	L	GF	GA	GD	Pts	Qualification or relegation
1	Muang Loei United (C, Q)	26	17	6	3	48	21	+27	57	Qualification to Group Stage round of Thai League 4 Champions League
2	Khon Kaen United (Q)	26	17	5	4	65	24	+41	56	Qualification to Group Stage round of Thai League 4 Champions League
3	Yasothon (Q)	26	10	10	6	30	23	+7	40 (Note: Yasothon ahead on head-to-head record; Yasothon 10 points, Sisaket United 4 points, Surin City 3 points)	Qualification to Preliminary round 1 of Thai League 4 Champions League
4	Sisaket United	26	10	10	6	29	23	+6	40	
5	Surin City	26	10	10	6	38	29	+9	40	
6	Nongbua Pitchaya U-23	26	10	8	8	36	25	+11	38	
7	Mashare Chaiyaphum	26	9	8	9	26	31	−5	35	
8	Surin Sugar Khong Chee Mool	26	9	7	10	45	53	−8	34	
9	Buriram United U-23	26	7	10	9	37	33	+4	31	Could not compete in 2019 Thai League 4 when this zone have member too much. PLT judge this quota
10	Mahasarakham	26	7	9	10	31	37	−6	30	
11	Sakon Nakhon	26	7	8	11	32	45	−13	29 (Note: Sakon Nakhon ahead on head-to-head record; Sakon Nakhon 4 points, Huai Thalaeng United 1 points)	
12	Huai Thalaeng United	26	8	5	13	36	42	−6	29	
13	Loei City (R)	26	6	7	13	28	39	−11	25	Relegation to the 2019 Thailand Amateur League
14	Ubon UMT United U-23	26	1	5	20	24	81	−57	8	Could not compete in 2019 Thai League 4

Updated to match(es) played on 26 August 2018 PLT etiquette meeting report of Buriram United U-23 vs Loei City in this link. Source: Thai League 4
Rules for classification: 1) Points; 2) Head-to-head points; 3) Overall goals difference; 4) Overall goals scored; 5) Fair play points; 6) Play-off without extra time;).
(C) Champions; (Q) Qualified for the phase indicated; (R) Relegated

=== Results by match played ===
Team ╲ Round	1	2	3	4	5	6	7	8	9	10	11	12	13	14	15	16	17	18	19	20	21	22	23	24	25	26
Muang Loei United	D	D	W	W	W	D	W	D	W	W	L	W	W	W	D	W	W	W	W	W	L	D	W	L	W	W
Khonkaen United	W	D	W	L	D	D	W	W	L	D	W	L	W	W	D	W	L	W	W	W	W	W	W	W	W	W
Yasothon	L	D	D	D	W	W	W	W	D	D	W	L	D	L	D	W	L	D	L	W	W	L	W	W	D	D
Sisaket United	D	L	L	D	D	L	D	D	L	W	W	D	L	W	D	W	W	D	W	L	W	D	W	W	D	W
Surin City	D	D	W	D	D	W	W	W	W	D	D	W	D	L	W	L	W	D	D	D	L	W	L	L	W	L
Nongbua Pitchaya U-23	D	W	D	L	L	D	L	L	D	D	D	D	L	W	W	W	W	L	L	W	W	W	D	L	W	W
Mashare Chaiyaphum	W	L	W	W	L	W	L	W	W	D	D	W	D	W	D	L	L	L	D	D	L	W	L	D	D	L
Surin Sugar Khong Chee Mool	L	W	D	D	L	L	L	D	W	D	W	D	L	L	D	W	W	D	L	W	W	L	L	W	L	W
Buriram United U-23	W	D	L	L	W	L	W	L	D	L	D	W	D	D	D	L	W	D	L	L	D	W	D	D	L	W
Mahasarakham	W	D	L	W	W	L	D	W	D	L	L	D	D	D	L	D	L	W	L	W	L	D	L	L	W	D
Sakon Nakhon	L	W	D	L	D	L	W	L	L	D	D	W	W	L	L	D	W	D	D	L	W	W	L	L	D	L
Huai Thalaeng United	D	L	W	W	L	W	L	L	L	D	D	L	L	L	W	L	W	L	W	D	W	L	W	D	L	L
Loei City	D	W	L	D	D	W	L	D	W	D	L	L	D	W	D	L	L	L	L	W	L	L	L	W	L	L
Ubon UMT United U-23	L	L	L	D	D	D	L	L	L	D	L	L	W	L	L	L	L	L	L	L	L	L	L	D	D	L

Source: Thai League 4
W = Win; D = Draw; L = Loss

== Results ==
Home \ Away	BRU	HTU	KKU	LCT	MSK	MCP	MLU	NON	SKN	SKU	SRC	KCM	UMT	YST
Buriram United U-23		1–0	3–3	0–2	0–0	1–1	0–1	1–0	1–1	0–0	1–2	4–1	4–0	1–1
Huai Thalaeng United	2–2		2–1	2–1	2–1	1–1	0–3	1–2	1–3	1–2	0–3	2–1	4–0	2–1
Khonkaen United	1–0	2–1		1–0	2–0	1–2	3–1	1–0	5–0	1–1	3–0	11–2	7–0	3–0
Loei City	2–1	3–0	1–4		1–1	1–2	0–0	1–5	3–2	0–0	0–1	2–2	2–1	0–3
Mahasarakham	1–1	3–1	1–2	2–1		1–0	0–0	0–0	1–1	1–1	0–1	2–2	4–2	1–0
Mashare Chaiyaphum	1–0	0–3	0–2	0–0	4–2		0–3	3–2	1–0	0–0	0–0	1–0	2–1	0–0
Muang Loei United	3–1	2–1	3–2	2–0	3–2	1–0		4–1	2–1	1–0	1–1	3–1	5–2	1–0
Nongbua Pitchaya U-23	1–1	1–0	0–1	1–1	3–0	3–2	0–0		1–1	1–1	2–0	0–0	6–2	1–0
Sakon Nakhon	1–2	1–1	2–4	1–0	2–3	2–1	2–1	0–3		1–0	2–2	2–2	4–1	0–1
Sisaket United	4–2	1–1	1–0	1–0	3–2	0–2	2–2	1–0	0–0		2–0	3–2	3–2	0–1
Surin City	2–2	1–1	1–1	1–1	2–1	2–0	1–2	1–1	6–0	2–0		1–1	3–1	0–2
Surin Sugar Khong Chee Mool	1–5	3–2	0–1	4–1	2–0	3–1	1–0	0–1	0–2	1–0	3–2		3–0	2–2
Ubon UMT United U-23	0–2	1–4	3–3	1–5	0–1	1–1	1–6	2–1	0–0	0–3	1–1	1–4		0–2
Yasothon	2–1	2–1	0–0	1–0	1–1	1–1	0–0	1–0	3–1	0–0	1–2	4–4	1–1	

Updated to match(es) played on 26 August 2018. Source: Thai League 4
Legend: Blue = home team win; Yellow = draw; Red = away team win.

== Season statistics ==
=== Top scorers ===
As of 26 August 2018.

Rank	Player	Club	Goals
1	(Thailand) Chawin Thirawatsri	Muang Loei United	17
2	(Brazil) Jardel Capistrano	Khonkaen United	15
2	(Nigeria) Abass Ouro-nimini	Muang Loei United	15
4	(Ivory Coast) Coulibaly Bangaly	Huai Thalaeng United (9), Khonkaen United (5)	14
5	(Thailand) Tirawut Tiwato	Surin Sugar Khong Chee Mool	13
6	(Thailand) Rewat Yotapakdee	Mahasarakham	12
7	(Thailand) Watthanapon Chinthong	Surin City	11
8	(Thailand) Jakkrawut Songma	Nongbua Pitchaya U-23	10
9	(Thailand) Pattara Soimalai	Buriram United U-23	8
9	(Ghana) Kelvin Amdonsah	Mashare Chaiyaphum	8
9	(Thailand) Ittipol Pol-arj	Mashare Chaiyaphum	8
9	(Thailand) Nopparat Auraikae	Nakhon Ratchasima Huai Thalaeng United	8
9	(Thailand) Decha Sirifong	Sakon Nakhon	8
14	(Thailand) Charin Boodhad	Ayutthaya United (6), Khonkaen United (6)	7
14	(Thailand) Palakorn Worklang	Loei City	7
14	(Ghana) Joseph Quasi Amponsah	Mashare Chaiyaphum	7
14	(Thailand) Krit Phavaputanon	Uttaradit (3), Muang Loei United (4)	7
14	(Guinea) Diop Badara Aly	Yasothon	7
19	(Thailand) Nitirat Wiangdindam	Loei City	6
19	(Togo) Andre Houma	Muang Loei United	6
19	(Thailand) Wittaya Thanawatcharasanti	Nongbua Pitchaya U-23	6
19	(Thailand) Jakkrit Songma	Nongbua Pitchaya U-23	6
19	(Thailand) Niyom Kamchompoo	Sakon Nakhon	6
19	(Thailand) Apiwat Chuenban	Surin Sugar Khong Chee Mool	6
19	(Thailand) Anusorn Sang-ngam	Surin City	6
19	(Thailand) Jakkapong Srisa-nga	Yasothon	6
19	(Thailand) Saharat Khiawsa-ard	Ubon UMT United U-23	6
28	(Thailand) Thirapak Prueangna	Buriram United U-23	5
28	(Brazil) Nelisson Da Assunçao Teles	Khonkaen United	5
28	(Japan) Tomohiro Onodera	Ayutthaya United (2), Khonkaen United (5)	5
28	(Thailand) Noppawit Obma	Khonkaen United	5
28	(Thailand) Nutthikorn Yaprom	Sakon Nakhon	5
28	(Nigeria) Ekejiuba Chimaobi Wellington	Sakon Nakhon	5
28	(Thailand) Suriyan Ckankam	Sisaket United	5
28	(Thailand) Chaokanan Chueasaiduang	Surin Sugar Khong Chee Mool	5
28	(Thailand) Wiwat Jantawong	Ubon UMT United U-23	5
37	(Thailand) Yutpichai Lertlam	Buriram United U-23	4
37	(Thailand) Phongchana Kongkirit	Buriram United U-23	4
37	(Thailand) Suphanat Mueanta	Buriram United (2), Buriram United U-23 (4)	4
37	(Thailand) Noraset Lakthong	Loei City	4
37	(Thailand) Watchala Artisumongkol	Loei City	4
37	(Thailand) Naruebet Rodmuang	Nakhon Ratchasima Huai Thalaeng United	4
37	(Senegal) Aliou Seck	Sakaeo (1), Nakhon Ratchasima Huai Thalaeng United (4)	4
37	(Thailand) Chatchai Nanthawichianrit	Sisaket United	4
37	(Thailand) Weerayut Phuiphom	Sisaket United	4
37	(Thailand) Poosit Suk-ruam	Surin City	4
37	(Thailand) Wisitsak Bunsawas	Surin Sugar Khong Chee Mool	4
37	(Thailand) Sittisak Chantawan	Surin Sugar Khong Chee Mool	4
37	(Thailand) Adisak Sorsungnoen	Yasothon	4
37	(Ghana) Otis Sarfo Adjei	Yasothon	4

=== Hat-tricks ===
Player	For	Against	Result	Date
(Ivory Coast) Coulibaly Bangaly	Huai Thalaeng United	Ubon UMT United U-23	4–1	24 February 2018
(Thailand) Chawin Thirawatsri	Muang Loei United	Mahasarakham	3–2	21 April 2018

== Attendance ==
Pos	Team	Total	High	Low	Average	Change
1	Khonkaen United	46,917	5,386	3,188	3,910	−20.0%
2	Yasothon	15,677	1,789	654	1,206	+138.3%
3	Surin City	9,193	2,225	361	707	+100.9%
4	Muang Loei United	7,045	845	380	542	+1.1%
5	Mahasarakham	3,110	658	117	283	+4.4%
6	Ubon UMT United U-23	3,223	500	115	248	n/a
7	Mashare Chaiyaphum	2,945	500	100	227	−23.6%
8	Nongbua Pitchaya U-23	2,719	365	101	209	n/a
9	Surin Sugar Khong Chee Mool	2,673	471	41	206	n/a
10	Loei City	2,666	383	77	205	+21.3%
11	Sakon Nakhon	1,750	350	42	135	+23.9%
12	Sisaket United	1,448	190	67	111	−42.5%
13	Buriram United U-23	1,343	143	62	103	−33.5%
14	Huai Thalaeng United	1,061	170	24	82	−59.6%
	League total	101,770	5,386	24	569	+69.9%

Updated to games played on 26 August 2018
Source: Thai League 4

=== Attendance by home match played ===
Team \ Match played	1	2	3	4	5	6	7	8	9	10	11	12	13	Total
Buriram United U-23	113	109	130	62	66	74	143	100	98	39	66	232	111	1,343
Huai Thalaeng United	170	167	134	60	37	72	60	50	110	39	24	56	82	1,061
Khonkaen United	4,187	3,912	4,225	3,762	3,387	3,495	4,218	Unk.2	3,188	3,378	5,386	4,288	3,491	46,917
Loei City	300	300	200	215	77	139	150	383	135	202	200	215	150	2,666
Mahasarakham	429	130	120	170	280	250	300	117	Unk.1	410	Unk.3	658	246	3,110
Mashare Chaiyaphum	375	220	478	210	200	150	140	172	200	100	500	100	100	2,945
Muang Loei United	461	845	480	500	380	442	666	558	623	520	495	580	495	7,045
Nongbua Pitchaya U-23	236	189	279	365	189	167	164	185	213	101	220	289	122	2,719
Sakon Nakhon	304	200	101	62	52	64	61	42	68	240	86	120	350	1,750
Sisaket United	190	100	143	82	113	99	90	99	130	95	135	67	105	1,448
Surin City	624	2,225	439	415	678	450	463	672	604	571	361	441	1,250	9,193
Surin Sugar Khong Chee Mool	471	375	388	155	70	160	184	385	108	146	60	130	41	2,673
Ubon UMT United U-23	500	285	328	415	252	237	215	212	221	196	132	115	115	3,223
Yasothon	1,750	1,500	1,200	1,050	1,789	860	1,330	846	654	920	1,290	845	1,643	15,677

Source: Thai League 4 Note:
Unk.1 Some error of T4 official match report 8 July 2018 (Mahasarakham 1–0 Mashare Chaiyaphum).
Unk.2 Some error of T4 official match report 8 July 2018 (Khonkaen United 7–0 Ubon UMT United U-23).
Unk.3 Some error of T4 official match report 1 August 2018 (Mahasarakham 0–0 Muang Loei United).

== See also ==
- 2018 Thai League
- 2018 Thai League 2
- 2018 Thai League 3
- 2018 Thai League 4
- 2018 Thailand Amateur League
- 2018 Thai FA Cup
- 2018 Thai League Cup
- 2018 Thailand Champions Cup
