= 2011 Regional League Division 2 =

Regional League Championships 2011
- Season: 2011
- Champions: Ratchaburi
- Promoted: Ratchaburi; Nakhon Ratchasima; Phattalung; Krabi

The 2011 Regional League Division 2 (also known as the AIS League for sponsorship reasons) was the 6th season of the Regional League Division 2, it had redirected from the division 2, since its establishment in 2006. The 77 clubs will be divided into 5 groups (regions).

Regional League Championships 2011 was contested by the five regional league winners and runners up of the 3rd level championships of Thailand. The two best 3rd placed teams from the regional leagues also take part

Twelve teams were split into two groups of A & B, with the top two teams from group A & B gaining promotion to the Thai 1st Division for the 2012 campaign, along with this, the two group winners would play off to determine the overall champions.

== Format ==
The qualification structure is as follows:

- Regional League round: Regional League each Zone, champion and runner-up or Highest 3rd point will advance to the Champions League round.
- Champions League round: It is divided into two groups, Group A, Group B. The top two teams of each group will Promotion spot for the Thai Division 1 League and Final,3/4 Place Playoff.

== 2011 Regional League round table All locations ==
Locations of the Regional League Division 2 All Teams in 2011
2011 Regional League Division 2 Bangkok & field Region
2011 Regional League Division 2 Central & Eastern Region
2011 Regional League Division 2 Northern Region
2011 Regional League Division 2 North Eastern Region
2011 Regional League Division 2 Southern Region

=== 2011 ===
red Zone:2011 Regional League Division 2 Bangkok Metropolitan Region
Yellow Zone:2011 Regional League Division 2 Central & Eastern Region
Green Zone: 2011 Regional League Division 2 Northern Region Region
Orange Zone:2011 Regional League Division 2 North Eastern Region
Blue Zone:2011 Regional League Division 2 Southern Region

=== List of qualified teams ===
Last Update October 1, 2011

Bangkok & field (2)

- Kasetsart University FC (Winner)
- North Bangkok College FC (Runner-up)

Central & Eastern (2)

- Ratchaburi FC (Winner)
- Rayong FC (Runner-up)

Northern (3)

- Phitsanulok FC (Winner)
- Lamphun Warrior (Runner-up)
- Phichit FC (Highest 3rd point)

North Eastern (3)

- Roi Et United (Winner)
- Loei City (Runner-up)
- Nakhon Ratchasima FC (Highest 3rd point)

Southern (2)

- Krabi FC (Winner)
- Phattalung FC (Runner-up)
Football clubs in Bangkok Metropolitan Region

== League table ==
=== Group A ===
Pos	Team	Pld	W	D	L	GF	GA	GD	Pts	Promotion
1	Ratchaburi	10	5	4	1	18	8	+10	19	Promotion spot for the Thai Division 1 League
2	Phattalung	10	5	2	3	13	9	+4	17	Promotion spot for the Thai Division 1 League
3	Loei City	10	4	4	2	11	9	+2	16	
4	Phitsanulok	10	4	1	5	13	14	−1	13	
5	Phichit	10	4	1	5	16	19	−3	13	
6	Kasetsart	10	1	2	7	7	19	−12	5	

=== Group B ===
Pos	Team	Pld	W	D	L	GF	GA	GD	Pts	Promotion
1	Nakhon Ratchasima	10	7	1	2	13	5	+8	22	Promotion spot for the Thai Division 1 League
2	Krabi	10	5	4	1	12	5	+7	19	Promotion spot for the Thai Division 1 League
3	Rayong	10	5	3	2	10	8	+2	18	
4	Roi Et United	10	3	2	5	7	9	−2	11	
5	North Bangkok College	10	1	3	6	7	14	−7	6	
6	Lamphun Warrior	10	0	5	5	5	13	−8	5	

Rules for classification: 1st points; 2nd head-to-head; 3rd goal difference; 4th goals scored

== 3/4 Place Playoff ==
25 December 2011
18.00 UTC+7

Phattalung	2 - 1	Krabi

Trang Stadium, Trang
Referee: Prathan Nasawang

== Final ==
24 December 2011
18.00 UTC+7

Ratchaburi	2 - 1	Nakhon Ratchasima

Suphachalasai Stadium, Bangkok
Referee: Chaiya Mahapab

== Champions ==
The 2011 Regional League Division 2 winners were Ratchaburi

== See also ==
- 2011 Thai Premier League
- 2011 Thai Division 1 League
- 2011 Thai FA Cup
- 2011 Kor Royal Cup
