= Saksit Yuencheewit =

Thai footballer

Personal information
- Full name: Saksit Yuencheewit
- Date of birth: 30 August 1991 (age 35)
- Place of birth: Thailand
- Height: 1.75 m (5 ft 9 in)
- Position: Striker

Senior career*
Years	Team	Apps	(Gls)
2011–2013	Khonkaen		
2014	Udon Thani	9	(4)
2014–2015	Loei City		
2015–2016	Electricite du Laos		
2016	Hua Hin City		
2017	Muang Loei United		
- * Club domestic league appearances and goals

Saksit Yuencheewit (Thai: ศักดิ์สิทธิ์ ยืนชีวิต) is a Thai professional footballer.

He previously played for Khonkaen F.C. in Thai Premier League.
