= Puttakun Narin =

Thai footballer

Personal information
- Full name: Puttakun Narin
- Date of birth: 29 January 1992 (age 34)
- Place of birth: Nong Han, Udon Thani, Thailand
- Height: 1.80 m (5 ft 11 in)
- Position: Forward

Youth career
- 2010: Thai Port

Senior career*
Years	Team	Apps	(Gls)
2011–2012	Thai Port		
2013–2014	Udon Thani	21	(0)
2015	Nongbua Pitchaya		
2016	Angthong		
2017	Hua Hin City		
2017–	Kopoon Warrior		
- * Club domestic league appearances and goals

Puttakun Narin (Thai: พุทธคุณ นรินทร์) is a Thai footballer.

He previously played for Thai Port F.C. in Thai Premier League.
