= Theodore Yuyun =

Cameroonian footballer (born 1989)

Personal information
- Full name: Theodore Yuyun
- Date of birth: December 16, 1989 (age 36)
- Place of birth: Bamenda, Cameroon
- Height: 1.77 m (5 ft 10 in)
- Position: Midfielder

Senior career*
Years	Team	Apps	(Gls)
2005–2008	KSA Douala		
2008–2009	PWD Bamenda		
2009–2010	Ayutthaya		
2010	Os Belenenses		
2011–2012	Osotspa Saraburi		
2013–2014	Sukhothai		
2014	Udon Thani	11	(3)
2015	Nongbua Pitchaya		
2015–2016	Udon Thani	27	(5)
2017	Bangkok	25	(2)
- * Club domestic league appearances and goals

Theodore Yuyun is a Cameroonian professional footballer.

He previously played for Os Belenenses in the Portuguese Primeira Liga and Osotspa Saraburi F.C. in the Thai Premier League.
