= 2009 Regional League Division 2 North Eastern Region =

Regional League Division 2 North Eastern Region
- Season: 2009
- Champions: Loei City
- Biggest home win: Nakhon Ratchasima 8-0 Roi Et
- Biggest away win: Roi Et 1-8 Nakhon Phanom
- Highest scoring: Roi Et 1-8 Nakhon Phanom; Nakhon Phanom 6-3 Roi Et; Nakhon Phanom 4-5 Songkhla United (9)

2009 Regional League Division 2 North Eastern Region (Thai: ลีกภูมิภาค ภาคตะวันออกเฉียงเหนือ or ไทยลีกดิวิชัน 2 ภาคตะวันออกเฉียงเหนือ) is the 3rd Level League in Thailand. In 2009, contains 12 clubs from North Eastern region.

The league winners qualify for the end of season Regional Championships with the other four league winners in the Regional setup.

Ubon United FC withdrew from the league after playing 16 games, due to a dispute with the Thailand Football Association (FAT). All results were declared null and void. Ubon were also given a 2-year ban from competing. The league table was re-adjusted accordingly, after FAT previously thought about awarding 2-0 victories for the remaining games.

== Member clubs & locations ==
Locations of the 2009 Regional League North Eastern Teams

Club	Province	Home stadium	Capacity
Buriram	Buriram	Buriram Rajabhat University Stadium	?
Chaiyaphum United	Chaiyaphum	Chaiyaphum Province Stadium	2,464
Loei City	Loei	Loei Province Stadium	3,628
Mahasarakham City	Mahasarakham	IPE Mahasarakham Stadium	?
Mukdahan-Savannakhet	Mukdahan	Mukdahan Province Stadium	?
Nakhon Phanom	Nakhon Phanom	Pla Pak District Office	?
Nakhon Ratchasima	Nakhon Ratchasima	80th Birthday Stadium	20,141
Roi Et	Roi Et	Roi Et Province Stadium	2,215
Sakon Nakhon	Sakon Nakhon	Sakolrajwithayanukool School Stadium	?
Surin	Surin	Elephant Stadium	?
Udon Thani	Udon Thani	Institute of Physical Education Udon Thani Stadium	?

- Ubon United FC withdrew on the 16th matchday

== Final league table ==
Pos	Team	Pld	W	D	L	GF	GA	GD	Pts	Qualification
1	Loei City	20	14	3	3	44	19	+25	45	Champions and Regional League Championships entrant
2	Nakhon Ratchasima	20	12	7	1	50	21	+29	43	
3	Udon Thani	20	10	5	5	45	21	+24	35	
4	Buriram	20	8	7	5	28	20	+8	31	
5	Nakhon Phanom	20	8	5	7	42	44	−2	29	
6	Surin	20	7	7	6	27	20	+7	28	
7	Chaiyaphum United	20	6	6	8	17	21	−4	24	
8	Mahasarakham City	20	5	5	10	29	42	−13	20 (Note: Head to head: Mahasarakham win 5-4)	
9	Sakon Nakhon	20	6	2	12	25	48	−23	20	
10	Mukdahan-Savannakhet	20	3	10	7	25	33	−8	19	
11	Roi Et	20	2	1	17	19	62	−43	7	

Rules for classification: 1st points; 2nd head-to-head; 3rd goal difference; 4th goals scored.
Ubon United FC withdrew from the league after playing 16 games, due to a dispute with the Thailand Football Association (FAT). All results were declared null and void. Ubon were also given a 2-year ban from competing.

== Results ==
Home \ Away	BUR	MCH	LCT	MSK	MUK	NAKP	NAKR	ROI	SKN	SUR	UBU	UDT
Buriram		1–0	1–2	4–1	3–1	1–0	1–1	2–0	0–0	1–0	5–4	1–1
Chaiyaphum United	2–1		0–1	0–0	1–1	2–1	2–0	1–0	1–1	1–0	1–1	2–2
Loei City	2–1	3–0		3–1	0–0	2–0	1–3	3–0	3–2	0–0	6–2	2–0
Mahasarakham	1–1	1–2	0–2		5–1	1–2	1–4	3–1	4–0	0–0		0–6
Mukdahan-Savannakhet	0–0	1–1	1–2	1–2		1–1	2–2	4–0	2–3	2–1	1–2	0–4
Nakhon Phanom	4–5	2–1	2–1	5–2	1–1		1–1	6–3	2–1	3–3	2–1	0–4
Nakhon Ratchasima	0–0	1–0	4–2	2–1	3–3	1–1		8–0	6–1	0–0	1–0	3–1
Roi Et	1–1	2–0	1–4	2–3	1–2	1–8	2–4		1–2	1–2		2–4
Sakon Nakhon	1–3	1–0	1–7	4–1	1–0	1–2	0–3	0–1		2–5	1–1	0–3
Surin	2–1	0–0	0–2	1–1	1–1	6–1	0–1	3–0	1–3			1–0
Ubon United (Note: Ubon United FC withdrew from the league after playing 16 games, due to a dispute with the Thailand Football Association (FAT). All results were declared null and void. Ubon were also given a 2-year ban from competing.)	1–1	0–0	1–1	2–2	2–1			5–0	4–2	2–0		
Udon Thani	1–0	2–1	2–2	1–1	1–1	6–0	2–3	2–0	3–1	0–1	3–0	

Updated to match(es) played on unknown. Source: Football Association of Thailand website
Legend: Blue = home team win; Yellow = draw; Red = away team win.

== See also ==
- 2009 Regional League Division 2 Northern Region
- 2009 Regional League Division 2 Central & Eastern Region
- 2009 Regional League Division 2 Bangkok Metropolitan Region
- 2009 Regional League Division 2 Southern Region
