= Surin City F.C. =

Thai football club

Surin City สุรินทร์ ซิตี้
- Full name: Surin City Football Club สโมสรฟุตบอลจังหวัดสุรินทร์
- Nicknames: The War Elephants (พญาคชสาร)
- Short name: SRCITY
- Founded: 2009; 17 years ago
- Ground: Sri Narong Stadium; Surin, Thailand
- Capacity: 11,000
- Manager: Samatcha Ruampatana
- Coach: Thanat Phattharamanisri
- League: Thai League 3
- 2025–26: Thai League 3, 6th of 12 in the Northeastern region
Home colours	Away colours

Surin City Football Club (Thai: สโมสรฟุตบอลจังหวัดสุรินทร์) is a Thai semi-professional football club based in Surin Province. The club currently plays in Thai League 3 Northeastern region.

== Timeline ==
History of events of Surin Football Club

Year	Important events
2009	The club is formed as Surin Football Club, nicknamed The Crazy Elephants; Club admitted to the Regional League North Eastern Division; Home games to be played at Sri Narong Stadium; Kittisak Meejaroen named as the first ever coach of Surin
2013	The club is renamed Surin City Football Club

In 2022, Surin City competed in the Thai League 3 for the 2022–23 season. It is their 14th season in the professional league. The club started the season with a 1–0 home win over Udon United and they ended the season with a 1–1 away draw with Udon United. The club has finished 7th place in the league of the Northeastern region. In addition, in the 2022–23 Thai FA Cup Surin City was defeated 0–2 by Phitsanulok in the first round, causing them to be eliminated.

== Stadium and locations ==
Coordinates	Location	Stadium	Capacity	Year
14°52′30″N 103°29′48″E	Surin	Sri Narong Stadium	11,000	2009–2017

== Season by season record ==
Season	League									Thai FA Cup	League Cup	T3 Cup	Top goalscorer	
Season	Division	P	W	D	L	F	A	Pts	Pos	Thai FA Cup	League Cup	T3 Cup	Name	Goals
2009	Northeast	20	7	7	6	27	20	28	6th	R1			(Thailand) Sekson Jansing	12
2010	Northeast	30	7	11	12	30	42	32	13th	R1	QR1		(Thailand) Apichat Polpoon	13
2011	Northeast	30	12	9	9	35	32	45	6th	Opted out	QR1		(Thailand) Jakkaparn Chaiyasang	6
2012	Northeast	30	6	6	18	27	62	24	13th	Opted out	R1		(Thailand) Apichat Polpoon	
2013	Northeast	30	11	14	5	37	33	47	5th	Opted out	QR1			
2014	Northeast	26	11	8	7	43	28	41	4th	Opted out	QR1			
2015	Northeast	34	11	8	15	57	52	41	10th	Opted out	R1			
2016	Northeast	26	5	7	14	19	33	22	12th	Opted out	QR1			
2017	T4 Northeast	33	13	8	12	47	44	47	4th	R1	QR2		(Thailand) Sathorn Junsoem	10
2018	T4 Northeast	26	10	10	6	38	29	40	5th	QR	Opted out		(Thailand) Watthanapon Chinthong	11
2019	T4 Northeast	24	7	10	7	39	34	31	7th	QR	Opted out		(Thailand) Watthanapon Chinthong	13
2020–21	T3 Northeast	16	5	3	8	23	30	18	5th	QR	Opted out		(Thailand) Chitsanupong Minphimai	4
2021–22	T3 Northeast	24	10	2	12	49	47	32	6th	QR	Opted out		(Thailand) Watthanapon Chinthong	19
2022–23	T3 Northeast	24	8	10	6	26	26	34	7th	R1	Opted out		(Thailand) Nattawut Wutthiya, (Thailand) Watthanapon Chinthong	7
2023–24	T3 Northeast	24	14	2	8	38	26	44	3rd	R3	Opted out	QF	(Thailand) Watthanapon Chinthong	13
2024–25	T3 Northeast	20	2	12	6	14	19	18	9th	R3	Opted out	Opted out	(Thailand) Watthanapon Chinthong	5
2025–26	T3 Northeast	22	8	8	6	25	22	32	6th	QR	Opted out	LP	(Thailand) Kroekrit Rodmueang	6

Champions	Runners-up	Third Place	Promoted	Relegated

- P = Played
- W = Games won
- D = Games drawn
- L = Games lost
- F = Goals for
- A = Goals against
- Pts = Points
- Pos = Final position
- QR1 = First Qualifying Round
- QR2 = Second Qualifying Round
- R1 = Round 1
- R2 = Round 2
- R3 = Round 3
- R4 = Round 4
- R5 = Round 5
- R6 = Round 6
- QF = Quarter-finals
- SF = Semi-finals
- RU = Runners-up
- W = Winners

== Players ==
=== Current squad ===
As of 25 September 2024

Note: Flags indicate national team as defined under FIFA eligibility rules; some limited exceptions apply. Players may hold more than one non-FIFA nationality.

No.	Pos.	Nation	Player
1	GK	THA	Thammathon Kingkeaw
2	DF	THA	Chakhit Prombut
3	DF	THA	Aphidet Sawaengsuk
4	MF	THA	Aphisit Somdang
5	DF	THA	Nattaphol Pho-kam
6	DF	THA	Kitsanaphat Kingkaeo
7	MF	THA	Arttapon Sopa
8	FW	THA	Naruepol Yaiim
9	FW	THA	Adisorn Bunloet
10	FW	THA	Watthanapon Chinthong
11	FW	THA	Jattuphon Nueakaew
13	MF	THA	Komen Sangsamanan
14	FW	THA	Natthapong Jaisakunloed
16	DF	THA	Suphakrit Yamdee
17	FW	THA	Kroekrit Rodmueang
18	FW	THA	Paisan kitiamphaipruek

No.	Pos.	Nation	Player
19	FW	THA	Nattapong Pookdee
20	DF	THA	Surasak Bunjan
21	FW	THA	Phoomrapee Boonma
22	MF	THA	Thiraphon Praosaen
24	FW	THA	Setthawut Lapmak
27	MF	THA	Humin Sailun
28	DF	THA	Chonlathan Karnson
30	MF	THA	Amonthep Kamchadphai
33	DF	THA	Sippakorn Chapwaidee
34	DF	THA	Kittiphat Phiansamoe
35	MF	THA	Kiatisak Chankia
41	MF	THA	Wasinrapee Sukratanaangkoon
47	FW	THA	Thanawat Srihyoung
60	GK	THA	Kripon Chamnannao
62	MF	THA	Nitiphum Pralomram
95	GK	THA	Jeerasak Phananut

== Coaching staff ==
Position	Name
Manager	(Thailand) Nithikon Thaweechai
Head coach	(Thailand) Thanat Phattharamanisri
Team Staff	(Thailand) Sittawut Kaewdee (Thailand) Asawin Noppakao
Team Officer	(Thailand) Settawut Chokmoh
