= Thammawut Rungruang =

Thai footballer (born 1987)

Personal information
- Full name: Thammawut Rungruang
- Date of birth: 18 March 1987 (age 39)
- Place of birth: Thailand
- Height: 1.66 m (5 ft 5 1/2 in)
- Positions: Defender; defensive midfielder

Team information
- Current team: Udon Thani
- Number: 34

Senior career*
Years	Team	Apps	(Gls)
2010	Udon Thani	7	(0)
2011	TTM Phichit		
2011	PTT Rayong		
2012–2013	Udon Thani	30	(1)
2014–2016	BCC Tero	37	(3)
2017–	Udon Thani	9	(0)
- * Club domestic league appearances and goals

Thammawut Rungruang (Thai: ธรรมวุฒิ รุ่งเรือง) is a Thai professional footballer. He currently plays for Thai League 3 side Udon Thani. He previously played for TTM Phichit in Thai Premier League.
