= Wirapong Wannasiri =

Thai footballer (born 1983)

Personal information
- Full name: Wirapong Wannasiri
- Date of birth: February 2, 1983 (age 43)
- Place of birth: Udon Thani, Thailand
- Height: 1.73 m (5 ft 8 in)
- Position: Defender

Team information
- Current team: Air Force United
- Number: 13

Senior career*
Years	Team	Apps	(Gls)
2009–2013	Udon Thani F.C.	73	(11)
2014	Phitsanulok F.C.		
2014	Air Force United		
2015	Udon Thani F.C.	6	(0)
- * Club domestic league appearances and goals

Wirapong Wannasiri (Thai: วิรพงษ์ วรรณศิริ) is a Thai footballer.
