= Pornpong Pornjamsai =

Thai footballer (born 1987)

Personal information
- Full name: Pornpong Pornjamsai
- Date of birth: 13 November 1987 (age 38)
- Place of birth: Samut Prakan, Thailand
- Height: 1.74 m (5 ft 8 1/2 in)
- Position: Attacking midfielder

Team information
- Current team: Ayutthaya
- Number: 31

Youth career
- 2005: Bangkok United

Senior career*
Years	Team	Apps	(Gls)
2007–2010	Bangkok United	22	(0)
2011–2013	PTT Rayong	0	(0)
2014	Chiangmai	0	(0)
2014	Udon Thani	12	(0)
2015–	Ayutthaya	0	(0)
- * Club domestic league appearances and goals

Pornpong Pornjamsai (Thai: พรพงค์ พรแจ่มใส, born 13 November 1987) is a Thai professional footballer who currently plays for Ayutthaya in the Thai League 3.

He previously played for Bangkok University in the 2007 AFC Champions League group stage.
