= Hi-Tech Chaiyaphum United F.C. =

Thai football club

Hi-Tech Chaiyaphum United ไฮเทค ชัยภูมิ ยูไนเต็ด
- Full name: Hi-Tech Chaiyaphum United Football Club สโมสรฟุตบอล ไฮเทค ชัยภูมิ ยูไนเต็ด
- Nickname(s): The Fire Dragon (มังกรไฟ)
- Short name: HTCPU
- Founded: 2008; 17 years ago
- Ground: Chaiyaphum Province Stadium; Chaiyaphum, Thailand
- Capacity: 2,564
- Chairman: Arun Kongjaroen
- Manager: Chukiat Noosarung
- League: Thailand Semi-pro League
- 2023: Thailand Semi-pro League 4th, (Northeastern Region)
Home colours	Away colours

Hi-Tech Chaiyaphum United Football Club (Thai สโมสรฟุตบอล ไฮเทค ชัยภูมิ ยูไนเต็ด) is a Thai football club based in Chaiyaphum, Thailand. They currently play in Thailand Amateur League Northeastern region.

== Honours ==
=== Domestic leagues ===
- Provincial League:
  - Runners-up (1): 2008

== Stadium and locations ==
Coordinates	Location	Stadium	Year
15°48′29″N 102°01′15″E	Chaiyaphum	Chaiyaphum Province Stadium	2009–2013
15°48′29″N 102°01′03″E	Chaiyaphum	IPE Chaiyaphum Stadium	2014–2016
15°48′29″N 102°01′15″E	Chaiyaphum	Chaiyaphum Province Stadium	2016–present

== Season by season record ==
Season	League									FA Cup	League Cup	Top goalscorer	
Season	Division	P	W	D	L	F	A	Pts	Pos	FA Cup	League Cup	Name	Goals
2008	Pro League												
2009	Northeast	20	6	6	8	17	21	24	7th				
2010	Northeast	30	10	13	7	46	33	43	6th				
2011	Northeast	30	9	7	14	32	42	14*	16th		R1		
2012	Northeast	30	10	10	10	34	35	40	11th				
2013	Northeast	30	6	11	13	31	36	29	12th				
2014	Northeast	26	9	7	10	28	36	34	9th				
2015	Northeast	34	10	10	14	33	39	40	11th	Not Enter	Not Enter		
2016	Central	20	3	6	11	13	27	15	10th	Not Enter	Not Enter		
2017	T4 Northeast	33	20	7	6	65	41	67	2nd	Not Enter	Not Enter	(Ghana) Kelvin Amdonsah	15
2018	T4 Northeast	26	9	8	9	26	31	35	7th	Not Enter	Not Enter	(Ghana) Kelvin Amdonsah	8
2019	T4 Northeast	24	6	10	8	25	33	28	9th	Not Enter	Not Enter	(Thailand) Ittipol Polarj	9
2020–21	T3 Northeast	15	2	8	5	16	24	14	8th	Not Enter	Not Enter	(Guinea) Soumah Djibril Guineenne	7
2021–22	T3 Northeast	24	0	4	20	12	76	4	13th	QR	Not Enter	(Thailand) Yutthapoom Noosalung	4

The club was docked 20 points in 2011 for fielding an ineligible player

Champions	Runners-up	Third place	Promoted	Relegated

- P = Played
- W = Games won
- D = Games drawn
- L = Games lost
- F = Goals for
- A = Goals against
- Pts = Points
- Pos = Final position
- QR1 = First Qualifying Round
- QR2 = Second Qualifying Round
- R1 = Round 1
- R2 = Round 2
- R3 = Round 3
- R4 = Round 4
- R5 = Round 5
- R6 = Round 6
- QF = Quarter-finals
- SF = Semi-finals
- RU = Runners-up
- W = Winners

== Players ==
=== Current squad ===
As of 13 October 2020

Note: Flags indicate national team as defined under FIFA eligibility rules; some limited exceptions apply. Players may hold more than one non-FIFA nationality.

No.	Pos.	Nation	Player
1	GK	(Thailand) THA	Kittiphot Jinawhong
2	FW	(Thailand) THA	Hatsanai Buransuk
5	DF	(Thailand) THA	Jhetsada Chankheoa
6	MF	(Thailand) THA	Suwit Najumroen
7	DF	(Ghana) GHA	Armah Abraham Ayaa (captain)
8	MF	(Thailand) THA	Akkarapon Boonpakan
9	FW	(Thailand) THA	Adisak Thaipakdee
10	FW	(Ghana) GHA	Joseph Quasi Amponsah
11	DF	(Thailand) THA	Chaiyanan Seemawong
12	MF	(Thailand) THA	Anucha Phasuk
13	DF	(Thailand) THA	Sirapop Phomsonthi
14	DF	(Thailand) THA	Piya Sudnakrob
15	MF	(Thailand) THA	Nuttapoom Detprom
16	DF	(Thailand) THA	Kunasin Detprom
17	FW	(Thailand) THA	Yutthaphum Noosalung
18	GK	(Thailand) THA	Ratchaphon Thiamsorn

No.	Pos.	Nation	Player
19	FW	(Thailand) THA	Ittipol Polarj
20	DF	(Thailand) THA	Chatuphon Patisangkho
21	FW	(Thailand) THA	Weeraphon Noicharoey
22	FW	(Thailand) THA	Panyaboon Srichom
23	FW	(Thailand) THA	Patomwat Laokan
24	MF	(Thailand) THA	Kiardtikhun Sangdao
25	FW	(Thailand) THA	Patcharaphon Sae-chue
26	MF	(Thailand) THA	Watchaphol Jeenkham
27	GK	(Thailand) THA	Ampon Thaiwicharn
28	GK	(Thailand) THA	Pholkrit Kongjan
29	MF	(Thailand) THA	Noraphat Hongthong
30	DF	(Thailand) THA	Tanaphum Phungphum
31	GK	(Thailand) THA	Phumipat Sukkam
32	FW	(Thailand) THA	Wirachai Thatthiam
40	FW	(Guinea) GUI	Soumah Djibril Guineenne
