= Nakhon Phanom F.C. =

Thai football club

Nakhon Phanom FC นครพนม เอฟซี
- Full name: Nakhon Phanom Football Club สโมสรฟุตบอลจังหวัดนครพนม
- Nickname: The Steamboats
- Founded: 2009; 17 years ago
- Ground: Nakhon Phanom Provincial Administrative Organization Stadium; Nakhon Phanom, Thailand
- Capacity: 2,387
- Chairman: Pisit Aonma
- Manager: Thanakorn Kittitham
- League: Thailand Division 2 League
Home colours	Away colours

Nakhon Phanom Football Club (Thai สโมสรฟุตบอลจังหวัดนครพนม ), is a Thailand semi professional football club based in Nakhon Phanom Province. They currently play in Thailand Division 2 League North Eastern Region.

== Timeline ==
History of events of Nakhon Phanom Football Club

Year	Important events
2009	The club is formed as Nakhon Phanom Football Club, nicknamed The Steamboats; Club admitted to the Regional League North Eastern Division; Home games to be played at Pla Pak District Office Stadium; Thanakorn Kittitham named as the first ever coach of Nakhon Phanom

== Season by season record ==
Season	League									FA Cup	League Cup	Top goalscorer	
Season	Division	P	W	D	L	F	A	Pts	Pos	FA Cup	League Cup	Name	Goals
2009	Division 2 North-East	20	8	5	7	42	44	29	5th				
2010	Division 2 North-East	30	6	5	19	34	63	23	16th				
2011	Division 2 North-East	30	12	7	11	45	41	43	7th				
2012	Division 2 North-East	30	14	9	7	56	41	51	5th		QR2		
2013	Division 2 North-East	30	8	11	11	37	38	35	10th				
2014	Division 2 North-East	26	10	4	12	31	49	34	10th				
2015	Division 2 North-East	34	9	5	20	45	68	32	13th	Not Enter	Not Enter		
2016	Division 2 North-East	26	2	8	16	25	48	14	14th		Not Enter		

Champions	Runners-up	Third place	Promoted	Relegated

- P = Played
- W = Games won
- D = Games drawn
- L = Games lost
- F = Goals for
- A = Goals against
- Pts = Points
- Pos = Final position
- QR1 = First Qualifying Round
- QR2 = Second Qualifying Round
- R1 = Round 1
- R2 = Round 2
- R3 = Round 3
- R4 = Round 4
- R5 = Round 5
- R6 = Round 6
- QF = Quarter-finals
- SF = Semi-finals
- RU = Runners-up
- W = Winners

== Players ==
=== Current squad ===
As of May 16, 2009 Note: Flags indicate national team as defined under FIFA eligibility rules; some limited exceptions apply. Players may hold more than one non-FIFA nationality.

No.	Pos.	Nation	Player
1	GK	THA	Kittipong Sankhuntao
2	DF	LAO	Sangratree Wongsuriyasak
3	DF	LAO	Sommai Worraket
4	DF	THA	Decha Nanposri
5	DF	THA	Prasit Kumdee
6	DF	THA	Thongchai Paopa
8	MF	THA	Pravit Wangworn
9	FW	THA	Ouayporn Singpan
10	MF	CMR	Bernard Patrick
11	MF	THA	Siripol Supoken
12	DF	THA	Santisook Pantuwech
14	MF	THA	Nantawat Tumdee
15	DF	THA	Somchai Buachum
16	FW	THA	Boonyoung Sittikod
17	DF	THA	Weerasit Puttarat

No.	Pos.	Nation	Player
18	GK	THA	Likit Niwongsa
19	MF	THA	Taninwut Rungsantea
20	FW	CMR	Célestin Oliver
21	MF	THA	Sorarak Promjom
22	FW	THA	Sutthin Tinwasana
23	DF	THA	Apichart Kwawongsa
24	FW	THA	Jakkrit Pongkwan
25	DF	THA	Weeratham Dongdung
26	MF	THA	Ekkalak Pangkaew
30	MF	CMR	Halle Nestor
32	MF	THA	Sattawat Inta
33	FW	THA	Penpetch Penkul
34	DF	THA	Anulak Kantak
35	GK	THA	Vitoon Kumkrong
