= Kalasin F.C. =

Association football club in Thailand

Kalasin F.C. กาฬสินธุ์ เอฟซี
- Full name: Kalasin Football Club สโมสรฟุตบอลจังหวัดกาฬสินธุ์
- Nicknames: Pong lang (โปงลางคะนอง)
- Short name: KSFC
- Founded: 2010; 16 years ago
- Ground: Kalasin Town municipality Stadium; Kalasin, Thailand
- Capacity: 5,000
- Owner: Kalasin F.C. Limited Partnership
- Chairman: Chanuwat Waramit
- Head Coach: vacant
- League: Thailand Amateur League
Home colours	Away colours	Third colours

Kalasin Football Club (Thai: สโมสรฟุตบอลจังหวัดกาฬสินธุ์) is a Thai semi professional football club based in Kalasin Province. The club was formed in 2010 and entered the Thai League 3 Northern Region.

== Stadium and locations ==
Coordinates	Location	Stadium	Capacity	Year
16°25′02″N 103°31′11″E	Kalasin	Kalasin Town municipality Stadium	5,000	2010–2017

== Season by season record ==
Season	League									FA Cup	League Cup	Top goalscorer	
Season	Division	P	W	D	L	F	A	Pts	Pos	FA Cup	League Cup	Name	Goals
2010	Northeast	30	10	5	15	48	69	35	11th				
2011	Northeast	30	10	10	10	46	38	40	8th				
2012	Northeast	30	11	8	11	45	39	41	10th		R1		
2013	Northeast	30	11	11	8	37	33	44	8th		R2		
2014	Northeast	26	9	11	6	31	28	38	6th		QR2		
2015	Northeast	34	10	9	15	45	52	39	12th	Not Enter	QR1		
2016	Northeast	26	15	2	9	39	30	47	3rd	Not Enter	QR1		
2017	T3 Upper	26	10	4	12	34	40	34	9th	R1	R1	(Uganda) Martin Muwanga (Thailand) Watcharapong Buasri	7
2018	T3 Upper	26	4	9	13	20	39	21	14th	Not Enter	QR1	(Thailand) Pattarapol Suttidee	6
2019	T4 Northeast	24	4	8	12	26	51	20	13th	QR	1st QR	(Thailand) Rashanon Ragsa-ad	7

Champions	Runners-up	Third Place	Promoted	Relegated

- P = Played
- W = Games won
- D = Games drawn
- L = Games lost
- F = Goals for
- A = Goals against
- Pts = Points
- Pos = Final position
- QR1 = First Qualifying Round
- QR2 = Second Qualifying Round
- R1 = Round 1
- R2 = Round 2
- R3 = Round 3
- R4 = Round 4
- R5 = Round 5
- R6 = Round 6
- QF = Quarter-finals
- SF = Semi-finals
- RU = Runners-up
- W = Winners

== Current squad ==
Note: Flags indicate national team as defined under FIFA eligibility rules; some limited exceptions apply. Players may hold more than one non-FIFA nationality.

No.	Pos.	Nation	Player
3	DF	THA	Issara Rungruang
8	MF	GHA	Mensah Yaw
9	FW	THA	Phakhawat Poonachaing
11	FW	BRA	Caio
12	FW	THA	Roberto Hinkra
13	MF	THA	Pattarapol Suttidee
14	FW	THA	Watcharapong Buasri
15	MF	THA	Watin Phinyalak
16	DF	THA	Jirapong Chaiprom
18	GK	THA	Boonyarit Saroch
19	DF	THA	Nattapol Visetchart
20	FW	THA	Narongkorn Buasri
21	FW	THA	Arnon Prasongporn

No.	Pos.	Nation	Player
22	FW	THA	Aekachai Singwong
25	MF	THA	Chatcharin Phutangdan
26	FW	THA	Teerapol Palachom
27	MF	THA	Wanlop Payudod
28	DF	THA	Bancha Promcod
29	MF	THA	Techit Somthaisong
30	DF	THA	Weerachai Takoengpon
33	FW	THA	Nitikorn Sirichoo
34	DF	THA	Apisit Puen-ngooluem
35	MF	THA	Wittaya Thanawatsanti
55	DF	THA	Manasak Jaithon
66	DF	THA	Kriangsak Sanboran
99	FW	THA	Weerapong Korayok
