= Nongkhai F.C. =

Thai football club

Nong Khai F.T. หนองคาย เอฟ.ที.
- Full name: Nong Khai Football Team ทีมฟุตบอลจังหวัดหนองคาย
- Nicknames: The Nagas (ลูกพญานาค)
- Founded: 2010; 16 years ago
- Ground: Nong Khai Province Stadium; Nong Khai, Thailand
- Capacity: 5,000
- Chairman: Yutthana Sritabood
- Manager: 1MSGT. Preaw Kumsin
- League: Regional League Division; Thai FA Cup
Home colours	Away colours

Nong Khai Football Team (Thai ทีมฟุตบอลจังหวัดหนองคาย) is a Thai semi professional football club based in Nong Khai province. The club was formed in 2010 and entered the Regional League Division 2 allocating into the North-East Division.

== Stadium and locations ==
Coordinates	Location	Stadium	Capacity	Year
17°51′56″N 102°44′16″E	Nong Khai	Nong Khai Province Stadium (Nong Khai PAO. Stadium)	?	2010–2016

== Season by season record ==
Season	League									FA Cup	League Cup	Top goalscorer	
Season	Division	P	W	D	L	F	A	Pts	Pos	FA Cup	League Cup	Name	Goals
2010	North-East	30	9	6	15	38	46	33	12th				
2011	North-East	30	12	11	7	44	36	47	5th				
2012	North-East	30	13	8	9	49	33	47	6th		QR2		
2013	North-East	30	13	9	8	40	29	48	4th		R2		
2014	North-East	26	9	8	9	34	32	35	7th		QR1		
2015	North-East	34	4	8	22	34	81	20	17th	Not Enter	QR1		
2016	North-East	26	8	10	8	38	37	34	9th	Not Enter	R2		
2017	–	–	–	–	–	withdrew	–	–	–	–	–	–	–

Champions	Runners-up	Third place	Promoted	Relegated

- P = Played
- W = Games won
- D = Games drawn
- L = Games lost
- F = Goals for
- A = Goals against
- Pts = Points
- Pos = Final position
- QR1 = First Qualifying Round
- QR2 = Second Qualifying Round
- R1 = Round 1
- R2 = Round 2
- R3 = Round 3
- R4 = Round 4
- R5 = Round 5
- R6 = Round 6
- QF = Quarter-finals
- SF = Semi-finals
- RU = Runners-up
- W = Winners
