= Nakhon Phanom PAO Stadium =

Nakhon Phanom Provincial Administrative Organization Stadium
- Interactive map of Nakhon Phanom Provincial Administrative Organization Stadium
- Location: Nakhon Phanom, Thailand
- Coordinates: 17°24′32″N 104°46′37″E
- Capacity: 2,406
- Surface: Grass

Tenant
- Nakhon Phanom F.C. 2010-2011

Nakhon Phanom Provincial Administrative Organization Stadium or Nakhon Phanom Province Stadium (Thai: สนาม อบจ.นครพนม หรือ สนามกีฬาจังหวัดนครพนม) is a multi-purpose stadium in Nakhon Phanom Province, Thailand. It is currently used mostly for football matches and is the home stadium of Nakhon Phanom F.C. The stadium holds 2,406 people.
