= Loei City F.C. =

Thai football club

Loei City เลยซิตี้
- Full name: Loei City Football Club สโมสรฟุตบอลเลยซิตี้
- Nicknames: The Ta Khon Devils (ผีตาโขนออกศึก)
- Short name: LOEIFC
- Founded: 2009; 17 years ago
- Ground: Loei Riverside Stadium; Loei, Thailand
- Capacity: 3,628
- Chairman: นายจีระศักดิ์ น้อยก่ำ(สจโก้)
- League: Thailand Amateur League
Home colours	Away colours

Loei City Football Club (Thai สโมสรฟุตบอล เลย ซิตี้), is a Thailand semi professional football club based in Loei Province. The club currently plays in Thai League 4 North Eastern Region.

== History ==
Founded in 2009, Loei joined the new Thai football setup and started at the 3rd level setup, the Regional League North-East Division.

Loei duly came out on top come the end of the regular league season, thus claiming their first ever championship and also crowned as the first ever winners of the Regional League North-East Division.

On winning the championship, Loei entered the 2009 Regional League Championships. An end of season mini-league for all 5 Regional League Division 2 championship winning teams.

They retained 2010 Thai Division 2 League North Eastern Region title. For the second consecutive season they entered 2010 Regional League Division 2 play-offs. Yet again the Division 1 eluded them, and disappointingly Loei finished bottom in their mini-league.

== Timeline ==
History of events of Loei City Football Club

Year	Important events
2009	The club is formed as KTFC Loei City Football Club, nicknamed Ta Khon Devils; Club admitted to the Regional League North East Division; Home games to be played at River Side Stadium; Jeerasak Noikam named as the first ever coach of Loei City; Enter and then withdraw from the 2009 Thailand FA Cup; Crowned Regional League North-East Division champions
2010	Crowned Regional League North-East Division champions for the second consecutive year

== Honours ==
=== Domestic leagues ===
- Regional League North-East Division
  - Winners (2) : 2009, 2010
  - Runner Up (1) : 2011

== Stadium and locations ==
Coordinates	Location	Stadium	Capacity	Year
17°29′09″N 101°44′05″E	Loei	Loei Province Stadium	3,628	2009–2017

== Season by season record ==
Season	League									FA Cup	League Cup	Top goalscorer	
Season	Division	P	W	D	L	F	A	Pts	Pos	FA Cup	League Cup	Name	Goals
2009	North-East	20	14	3	3	44	19	45	1st	QR			
2010	North-East	30	21	4	5	67	27	67	1st				
2011	North-East	30	21	4	5	67	27	67	2nd	QF			
2012	North-East	30	15	9	6	51	28	54	4th	R1			
2013	North-East	30	12	9	9	50	40	45	6th				
2014	North-East	26	12	9	5	45	22	45	3rd		R1		
2015	North-East	34	21	7	6	72	36	70	4th	R2	R3		
2016	North	22	8	6	8	35	29	30	7th	R1	R1		
2017	T4 North-East	33	7	10	16	47	70	31	11th	R2	Not Enter	Kizito Tony	7
2018	T4 North-East	26	6	7	13	28	39	25	13th	Not Enter	QR2	Palakorn Worklang	7
2019	TA												

Champions	Runners-up	Third Place	Promoted	Relegated

- P = Played
- W = Games won
- D = Games drawn
- L = Games lost
- F = Goals for
- A = Goals against
- Pts = Points
- Pos = Final position
- QR1 = First Qualifying Round
- QR2 = Second Qualifying Round
- R1 = Round 1
- R2 = Round 2
- R3 = Round 3
- R4 = Round 4
- R5 = Round 5
- R6 = Round 6
- QF = Quarter-finals
- SF = Semi-finals
- RU = Runners-up
- W = Winners
