= Kalasin =

Kalasin กาฬสินธุ์
- Town
- Location in Thailand
- Coordinates: 16°26′3″N 103°30′33″E
- Country: Thailand
- Province: Kalasin Province
- Founded: 1937

Government
  - Mayor: Jaruwat Bunpherm

Area
  - Total: 16.96 km^{2} (6.55 sq mi)
- Elevation: 152 m (499 ft)

Population (2015)
  - Total: 34,429
  - Density: 2,030/km^{2} (5,258/sq mi)
- Time zone: UTC+7 (ICT)
- Postal code: 46000
- Area code: (+66) 43

Kalasin (Thai: กาฬสินธุ์) is a city (thesaban mueang) in northeast Thailand, the capital of Kalasin Province. As of 2015, it has a population of 34,429 It covers the whole tambon Kalasin of the Mueang Kalasin District, an area of 16.96 km^{2} (6.55 sq mi). Kalasin lies 513 kilometres (319 mi) north-northeast of Bangkok by road.

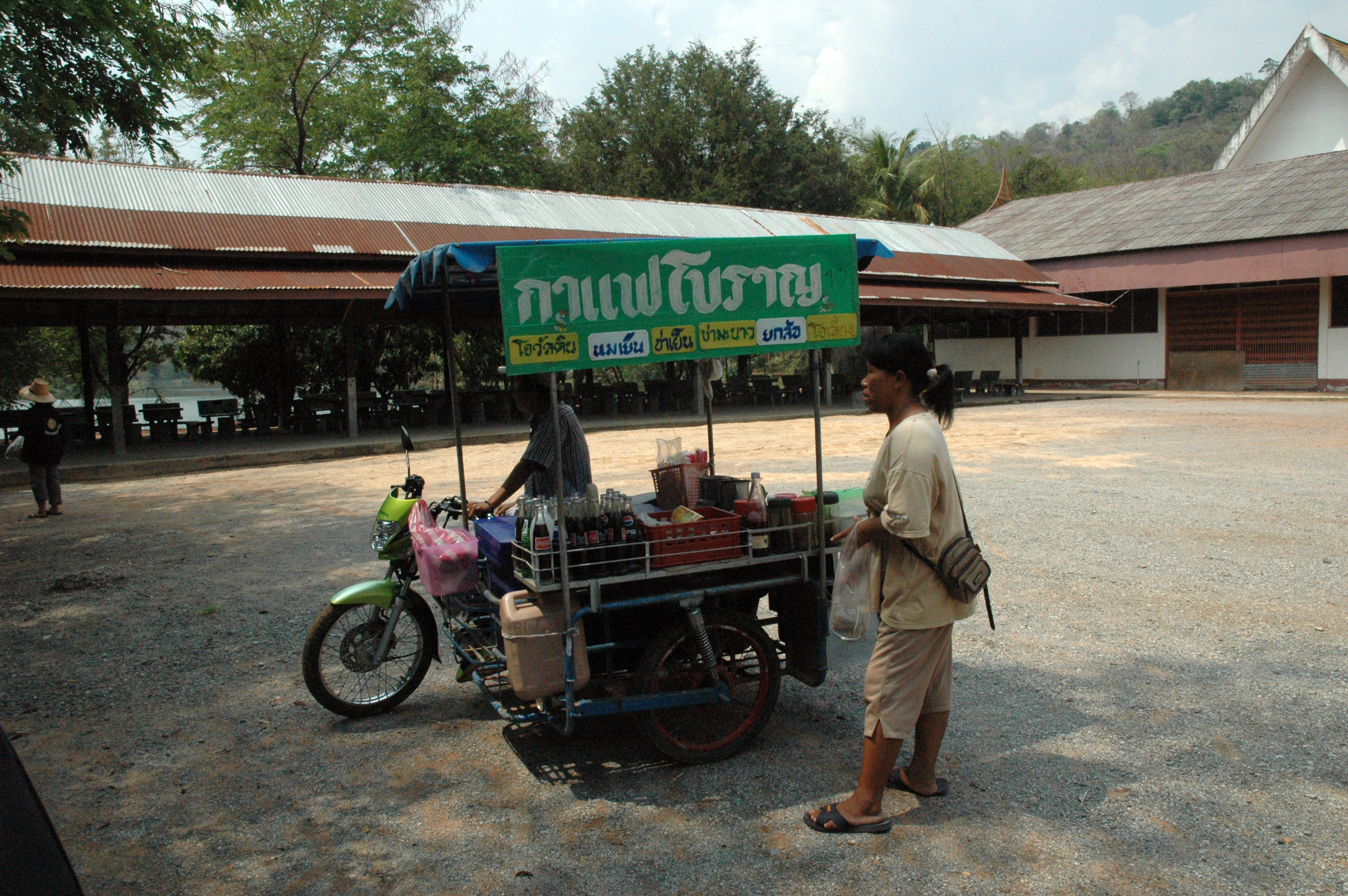
Isan woman approaching a coffee vendor in Kalasin.

== Geography ==
=== Climate ===
Climate data for Kalasin (1991–2020, extremes 1998-present)
Month	Jan	Feb	Mar	Apr	May	Jun	Jul	Aug	Sep	Oct	Nov	Dec	Year
Record high °C (°F)	36.3 (97.3)	38.3 (100.9)	40.8 (105.4)	43.3 (109.9)	42.9 (109.2)	40.0 (104.0)	41.1 (106.0)	36.6 (97.9)	36.6 (97.9)	35.3 (95.5)	36.9 (98.4)	36.0 (96.8)	43.3 (109.9)
Mean daily maximum °C (°F)	30.4 (86.7)	32.3 (90.1)	34.5 (94.1)	35.8 (96.4)	34.7 (94.5)	33.5 (92.3)	32.5 (90.5)	31.9 (89.4)	31.7 (89.1)	31.5 (88.7)	31.0 (87.8)	29.6 (85.3)	32.4 (90.4)
Daily mean °C (°F)	23.9 (75.0)	25.7 (78.3)	28.4 (83.1)	29.9 (85.8)	29.6 (85.3)	29.2 (84.6)	28.5 (83.3)	28.1 (82.6)	27.7 (81.9)	27.2 (81.0)	25.7 (78.3)	23.7 (74.7)	27.3 (81.2)
Mean daily minimum °C (°F)	17.4 (63.3)	19.4 (66.9)	22.4 (72.3)	24.3 (75.7)	25.0 (77.0)	25.3 (77.5)	25.0 (77.0)	24.8 (76.6)	24.4 (75.9)	23.0 (73.4)	20.3 (68.5)	17.4 (63.3)	22.4 (72.3)
Record low °C (°F)	9.5 (49.1)	8.2 (46.8)	12.5 (54.5)	16.3 (61.3)	18.4 (65.1)	22.0 (71.6)	22.2 (72.0)	21.7 (71.1)	20.5 (68.9)	15.4 (59.7)	12.0 (53.6)	5.5 (41.9)	5.5 (41.9)
Average precipitation mm (inches)	7.6 (0.30)	14.1 (0.56)	43.4 (1.71)	75.9 (2.99)	179.6 (7.07)	198.4 (7.81)	237.9 (9.37)	265.0 (10.43)	229.1 (9.02)	93.0 (3.66)	17.7 (0.70)	2.2 (0.09)	1,363.9 (53.70)
Average precipitation days (≥ 1.0 mm)	0.6	1.4	3.4	5.7	11.8	11.6	13.8	15.0	13.5	6.0	1.5	0.3	84.6
Average relative humidity (%)	66.9	65.8	66.0	69.0	75.4	78.3	81.1	83.8	84.6	78.9	72.4	68.1	74.2
Mean monthly sunshine hours	275.9	259.9	275.9	243.0	198.4	156.0	161.2	117.8	144.0	198.4	252.0	257.3	2,539.8
Source 1: World Meteorological Organization
Source 2: Office of Water Management and Hydrology, Royal Irrigation Department (sun 1981–2010)(extremes)
