= Nong Khai Province Stadium =

Stadium in Thailand

- Interactive map of Nong Khai Province Stadium
- Location: Nong Khai, Thailand
- Coordinates: 17°51′56″N 102°44′16″E
- Surface: Grass

Tenant
- Nong Khai F.C. 2010-

Nong Khai Province Stadium (Thai: สนามกีฬาจังหวัดหนองคาย หรือ สนาม อบจ.หนองคาย) is a multi-purpose stadium in Nong Khai province, Thailand. It is currently used mostly for football matches and is the home stadium of Nong Khai F.C.
