= Nongbua Pitchaya F.C. =

Thai football club

Nongbua Pitchaya หนองบัว พิชญ
- Full name: Nongbua Pitchaya Football Club สโมสรฟุตบอลหนองบัว พิชญ
- Nicknames: The Gamecocks (พญาไก่ชน)
- Short name: NBP
- Founded: 2010; 16 years ago as EGAT Nongbua Lamphu United; 2011; 15 years ago as Nongbua Lamphu; 2015; 11 years ago as Nongbua Pitchaya
- Ground: Pitchaya Stadium; Nong Bua Lamphu, Thailand
- Capacity: 12,000
- Chairman: Suthep Poomongkolsuriya
- Head coach: Santi Chaiyaphuak
- League: Thai League 2
- 2025–26: Thai League 2, 4th of 18
- Website: nongbua-pitchaya-fc.com
| Home colours | Away colours | Third colours |

Nongbua Pitchaya Football Club (Thai: สโมสรฟุตบอลหนองบัว พิชญ) is a Thai professional football club based in Nong Bua Lamphu province, Thailand, that currently compete in the Thai League 2, the second tier of the Thai football league system.

Nongbua was founded in Mueang Nong Bua Lam Phu district, Nong Bua Lamphu province in 2010. They played their home matches at Nong Bua Lamphu Province Stadium. They were first entered to the Thai football league system in 2010, competes in Thai Division 2 League (North Eastern Region), the third tier of Thai football league.

In 2017, Nongbua were first promoted to the Thai League 2, after winning the 2016 Regional League Division 2. In 2020 the club has won the 2020–21 Thai League 2 thus seeing them promoted to the 2021–22 Thai League 1 season for the first time in their history.

== History ==
=== The beginning and professionalism at the club ===
The club was formed by Sports Association of Nong Bua Lamphu Province in 2010 as Nongbua Lamphu United. Nong Bua Lamphu mayor Watchara Leeprasert became the first club chairman, while Suthin Srithong was the first coach and Electricity Generating Authority of Thailand (EGAT) was the club sponsor. The club entered the Thai Division 2 League (North Eastern Region) 2010 season, the third tier of the Thai football league system with the revamped name EGAT Nongbua Lamphu United and received the nickname Phu Phan Kham Thunder. On 14 February, Nongbua played their first ever game against Udon Thani at Institute of Physical Education Udon Thani Stadium, which ended in a 0–1 win. At the end of 2010 season, Electricity Generating Authority of Thailand (EGAT) didn't renew a sponsorship agreement. Club changed their badge and name to Nongbua Lamphu Football Club in 2011 season and received the new nickname Electric eel.

Nongbua played their first-ever match in the 2011 Thai League Cup on 18 May and lost to Yasothon United 7–4 in first qualifying round. In the league they finished 12th. In 2012 season they had a financial problems, but finished 12th again. During the 2013 season, a dismal form saw the team go bottom of table with 24 points from 30 games, finishing 15th. The club was forced to search for new owners. During the 2014 season, Suthep Poomongkolsuriya, owner of Pitchayabundit College, a private university in Nong Bua Lamphu, completed takeover of the club.

=== First title and new stadium (2015–present) ===
In the 2015 season, the club changed their badge and name to Nongbua Pitchaya. Nongbua had their first match in the Thai FA Cup on 24 June 2015 in the second round and they drew against Kamphaengphet 1–1, before losing in a penalty shoot-out. In the league, they finished 8th in Division 2 Northeast. In 2016 season, Nongbua relocated to the northern region. They qualified to Division 2 Champions League round as winner of Northern zone. In the league round, Nongbua qualified to semi-final, but following the death of King Bhumibol Adulyadej, the Football Association of Thailand cancelled the remaining matches. The club was promoted after the drawing of lots with Kasetsart and Trat.

==== Rise of Nongbua ====
Nongbua's first football stadium was completed for the Thai League 2 in 2020. Nongbua went on to win the 2020–21 Thai League 2 in March 2021, earning promotion to the Thai League 1 for the first time in their history.

== Stadium ==
Nongbua Pitchaya's officially moved to their new stadium, Pitchaya stadium which is officially meant for football purposes.

| Coordinates | Location | Stadium | Capacity | Year |
|---|---|---|---|---|
| 17°07′48″N 102°25′25″E | Nong Bua Lamphu | Nong Bua Lamphu Province Stadium | 4,333 | 2010–2020 |
| 17°11′51″N 102°25′59″E | Nong Bua Lamphu | Pitchaya Stadium | 6,000 | 2020–present |

== Academy development ==
Nongbua Pitchaya opened its first academies in 2016 in Northeast Thailand. Its under-13 and under-15 were the Northeastern Upper reginal winners of the Thailand Youth League in 2017-18 and 2018–19. The club's youth team performed well in CP-meiji Cup U-14 International Champions, in 2018 semi-final round beat Aspire Academy. The academy coaches use "Nong Bua Lona" style that focuses on agility, movement and passing.

== Kit manufacturers and shirt sponsors ==
| Year | Kit manufacturer | Main sponsor |
|---|---|---|
| 2017 | (Thailand) Eureka | (Thailand) DURO |
| 2018 | (Thailand) Warrix | (Thailand) DURO |
| 2019–2020 | (Thailand) Warrix | N/A |
| 2021–2023 | (Thailand) Warrix | (Thailand) Leo |
| 2023–present | (Thailand) Ego Sports | (Thailand) Leo |

== Affiliated clubs ==
In the future i would like to invite young kids like under 18 or under 16 or under 14 and then if they are good enough level with our club we will transfer him to our club soneday, if some players from Nongbua Pitchaya will join our club and then he play well like Chanathip so he can go to other club in the next level so other Japanese club or Europe.

— Kiyoshi Sekiguchi, Shonan Bellmare Technical Director.
- (Japan) Shonan Bellmare (2022–present)

- (Singapore) Hougang United (2025–present)

== Players ==
=== Current squad ===
Note: Flags indicate national team as defined under FIFA eligibility rules; some limited exceptions apply. Players may hold more than one non-FIFA nationality.

| No. | Pos. | Nation | Player |
|---|---|---|---|
| 4 | DF | BRA | Matheus Guedes |
| 5 | DF | THA | Adisak Waenlor |
| 6 | DF | THA | Teerapong Palachom |
| 8 | MF | THA | Reungyos Janchaichit |
| 9 | FW | BRA | Lucas Lima |
| 10 | FW | BRA | Luan Costa |
| 11 | FW | THA | Thanayut Jittabud |
| 14 | FW | THA | Nattawut Suksum |
| 16 | FW | THA | Jakkrawut Songma |
| 17 | DF | THA | Jakkrit Songma |
| 18 | GK | THA | Kittisak Moosawat |
| 19 | DF | THA | Apisit Saenseekhammuan |
| 22 | MF | THA | Pattaratron Buransuk |

| No. | Pos. | Nation | Player |
|---|---|---|---|
| 26 | GK | THA | Kittipong Phuthawchueak |
| 27 | DF | THA | Wutthichai Marom (Captain) |
| 33 | MF | BRA | Caio |
| 35 | MF | THA | Saharat Panmarchya |
| 36 | MF | THA | Thianchai Chantra |
| 39 | GK | THA | Thanasak Kittitarakul |
| 41 | DF | THA | Phanthakarn Artsomboon |
| 54 | MF | THA | Phattaraburin Chansuwan |
| 69 | MF | THA | Pakorn Seekaewnit |
| 77 | FW | THA | Peeranan Buakhai |
| 79 | DF | THA | Ratchanon Wichangoen |
| 95 | FW | THA | Panupong Phuakphralap |
| 97 | MF | THA | Nattawat Laksanangam |

Note 1: The official club website lists the supporters as player 12th man.

=== Out on loan ===
Note: Flags indicate national team as defined under FIFA eligibility rules; some limited exceptions apply. Players may hold more than one non-FIFA nationality.

| No. | Pos. | Nation | Player |
|---|---|---|---|
| 14 | FW | THA | Thanawut Phochai (at (Japan) SC Sagamihara) |
| 29 | FW | THA | Chawin Srichan (at (Thailand) Muang Loei United) |

== Management and technical staff ==
=== Management ===
| Position | Name |
|---|---|
| President | (Thailand) Suthep Poomongkolsuriya |
| Vice president | (Thailand) Kritsaya Phumongkolsuriya |

=== Technical staff ===
| Position | Name |
|---|---|
| Head coach | (Thailand) Santi Chaiyaphuak |
| Assistant coach | (Thailand) Suphachat Manakit |
| Goalkeeper coach | (Thailand) Chanapol Kasemnet |
| Fitness coach | (Thailand) Watthana Nuttathat |
| Club doctor | (Thailand) Manusak Boon-arj |

== Honours ==
=== Domestic ===
- Thai League 2
  - Champions (1): 2020–21
- Regional League Northern Division
  - Champions (1): 2016

== Former players ==
=== Internationally capped players ===
| AFC/OFC: (Iran) Mahan Rahmani; (Palestine) Islam Batran; (Palestine) Mahmoud Eid; (Philippines) Amani Aguinaldo; (Philippines) Christian Rontini; (Philippines) Iain Ramsay; (Philippines) Miguel Clarino; (Philippines) Simen Lyngbø; (Singapore) Izwan Mahbud; (Singapore) Song Ui-young; (South Korea) Cho Sung-hwan; (South Korea) Park Jong-woo | CAF: (Madagascar) Njiva Rakotoharimalala; (Sudan) Abo Eisa | UEFA: (Israel) Lidor Cohen | CONMEBOL/ CONCACAF: (Brazil) Judivan; (Canada) Marcus Haber; (Chile) Ramsés Bustos; (Cape Verde) Alvin Fortes; (Jamaica) Deshorn Brown |

== Managerial history ==
| Name | Period | Honours |
|---|---|---|
| (Thailand) Suthin Srithong | January–December 2010 | |
| (Thailand) Prasith Seelachai | January–May 2011 | |
| (Thailand) Vilas Thipparos | May–December 2011 | |
| (Thailand) Ong-ard Prawong | January–March 2012 | |
| (Thailand) Supete Srisuwan | March–December 2012 | |
| (Thailand) Kiattisak Kamnerdboon | January–May 2013 | |
| (Thailand) Natthasak Phusordngern | May–December 2013 | |
| (Thailand) Saneh Lungkaew | January–December 2014 | |
| (Thailand) Theerawekin Seehawong | January 2015–November 2018 | 2016 Regional League Division 2 Northern Region |
| (Spain) David Pons Carbonero | December 2018–January 2019 | |
| (Japan) Sugao Kambe | January–June 2019 | |
| (Northern Ireland) Matthew Holland | June–November 2019 | |
| (Thailand) Somchai Chuayboonchum | November 2019–April 2021 | 2020–21 Thai League 2 |
| (Thailand) Thawatchai Damrong-Ongtrakul | May 2021–November 2022 | |
| (Brazil) Emerson Pereira da Silva | December 2022–February 2023 | |
| (Thailand) Theerawekin Seehawong (Interim) | February–July 2023 | |
| (Thailand) Sukrit Yothee | July–June 2026 | 2023–24 Thai League 2 runners-up |
| (Thailand) Santi Chaiyaphuak | July 2026–present | |

== Season by season record ==
| Season | League | | | | | | | | | FA Cup | League Cup | Top goalscorer | |
| Season | Division | P | W | D | L | F | A | Pts | Pos | FA Cup | League Cup | Name | Goals |
|---|---|---|---|---|---|---|---|---|---|---|---|---|---|
| 2010 | North-East | 30 | 10 | 7 | 13 | 44 | 54 | 37 | 10th | Opted out | Opted out | | |
| 2011 | North-East | 30 | 6 | 6 | 18 | 34 | 65 | 24 | 12th | Opted out | QR1 | | |
| 2012 | North-East | 30 | 6 | 14 | 10 | 35 | 41 | 32 | 12th | Opted out | QR1 | | |
| 2013 | North-East | 30 | 4 | 12 | 14 | 21 | 49 | 24 | 15th | Opted out | R1 | | |
| 2014 | North-East | 26 | 6 | 11 | 9 | 21 | 30 | 29 | 12th | Opted out | QR1 | | |
| 2015 | North-East | 34 | 14 | 8 | 12 | 47 | 42 | 50 | 8th | R2 | QR2 | | |
| 2016 | North | 22 | 12 | 7 | 3 | 48 | 22 | 43 | 1st | R2 | R2 | | |
| 2017 | T2 | 32 | 10 | 11 | 11 | 45 | 47 | 41 | 8th | QF | R2 | (Brazil) Jardel Capistrano (Thailand) Weerayut Sriwichai (Thailand) Issarapong Lilakorn | 6 |
| 2018 | T2 | 28 | 12 | 9 | 7 | 32 | 35 | 45 | 5th | R1 | R1 | (France) Goran Jerković | 13 |
| 2019 | T2 | 34 | 12 | 10 | 12 | 43 | 42 | 46 | 9th | R2 | SF | (Sweden) Christer Youssef | 6 |
| 2020–21 | T2 | 34 | 21 | 12 | 1 | 63 | 16 | 75 | 1st | R3 | – | (Brazil) Valdo | 14 |
| 2021–22 | T1 | 30 | 13 | 8 | 9 | 42 | 35 | 47 | 6th | QF | R16 | (Brazil) Hamilton | 19 |
| 2022–23 | T1 | 30 | 5 | 6 | 19 | 27 | 47 | 21 | 15th | R3 | R16 | (Brazil) Barros Tardeli | 11 |
| 2023–24 | T2 | 34 | 22 | 6 | 6 | 80 | 39 | 72 | 2nd | R3 | R1 | (Brazil) Jardel | 14 |
| 2024–25 | T1 | 30 | 6 | 9 | 15 | 37 | 62 | 27 | 14th | R2 | SF | (Brazil) Paulo Conrado | 8 |
| 2025–26 | T2 | 34 | 16 | 6 | 12 | 59 | 59 | 54 | 4th | | | | |

| Champions | Runners-up | Third place | Promoted | Relegated |

- P = Played
- W = Games won
- D = Games drawn
- L = Games lost
- F = Goals for
- A = Goals against
- Pts = Points
- Pos = Final position
- QR1 = First Qualifying Round
- QR2 = Second Qualifying Round
- R1 = Round 1
- R2 = Round 2
- R3 = Round 3
- R4 = Round 4
- R5 = Round 5
- R6 = Round 6
- QF = Quarter-finals
- SF = Semi-finals
- RU = Runners-up
- W = Winners
