= Kalasin Town municipality Stadium =

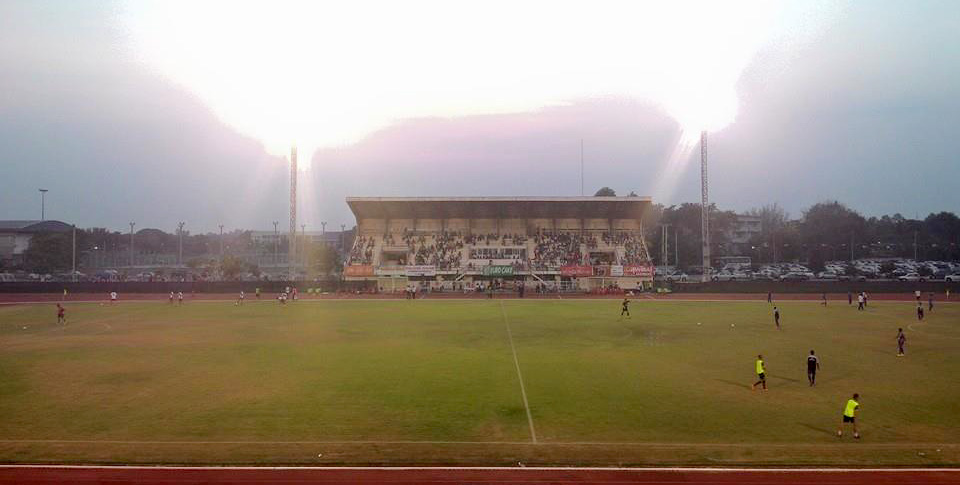
- Interactive map of Kalasin Town municipality Stadium
- Location: Kalasin, Thailand
- Coordinates: 16°25′02″N 103°31′11″E
- Capacity: 5,000
- Surface: Grass

Tenant
- Kalasin F.C. 2010-2011

Kalasin Town municipality Stadium or Kalasin Province Stadium (Thai: สนามเทศบาลเมืองกาฬสินธุ์ หรือ สนามกีฬากลางจ.กาฬสินธุ์) is a multi-purpose stadium in Kalasin Province, Thailand. It is currently used mostly for football matches and is the home stadium of Kalasin F.C. The stadium holds 5,000 people.
