= Nong Bua Lamphu Province Stadium =

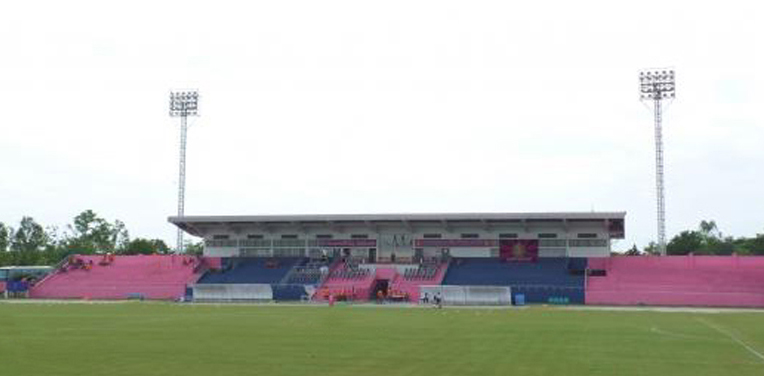
- Interactive map of Nong Bua Lamphu Province Stadium
- Location: Nong Bua Lamphu, Thailand
- Coordinates: 17°07′48″N 102°25′25″E
- Owner: Nong Bua Lamphu Provincial Administrative Organization
- Operator: Nong Bua Lamphu Provincial Administrative Organization
- Capacity: 4,000
- Surface: Grass

Nong Bua Lamphu Province Stadium (Thai: สนามกีฬาจังหวัดหนองบัวลำภู) is a multi-purpose stadium in Nong Bua Lamphu Province, Thailand. It was used mostly for football matches and was the home stadium of Nongbua Pitchaya F.C.
