= Loei Province Stadium =

- Interactive map of Loei Province Stadium
- Location: Loei, Thailand
- Coordinates: 17°29′09″N 101°44′05″E
- Capacity: 3,628
- Surface: Grass

Tenant
- Loei City F.C. 2010-2011

Loei Province Stadium (Thai: สนามกีฬาจังหวัดเลย หรือ สนามริเวอร์ไซด์) is a multi-purpose stadium in Loei Province, Thailand. It is currently used mostly for football matches and is the home stadium of Loei City F.C. The stadium holds 3,628 people.
