= Sri Narong Stadium =

Multi-purpose stadium in Thailand

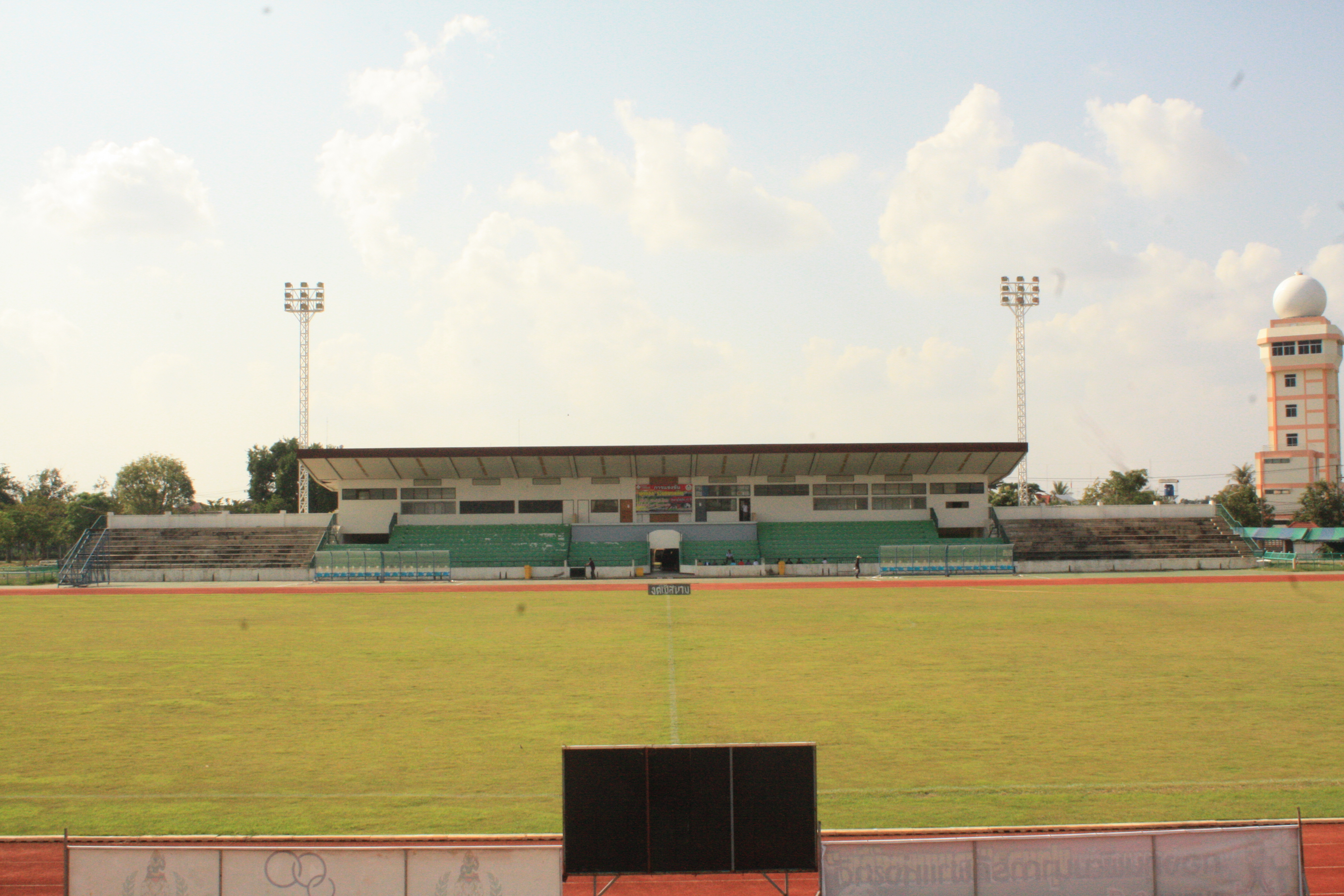
- Interactive map of Sri Narong Stadium
- Location: Surin, Thailand
- Coordinates: 14°52′30″N 103°29′48″E
- Owner: Sports Authority of Thailand (SAT)
- Operator: Sports Authority of Thailand (SAT)
- Capacity: 11,000
- Surface: Grass

Construction
- Opened: 1994

Tenant
- Surin City F.C. 2010-2011

Sri Narong Stadium (Thai: สนามกีฬาศรีณรงค์) is a multi-purpose stadium in Surin Province, Thailand. It is currently used mostly for football matches and is the home stadium of Surin City F.C.

This stadium used to be a boxing match between Khaosai Galaxy and Alberto Castro of Columbia in 1989, for Khaosai 11th defense of the WBA Junior bantamweight world title, the competition results are Khaosai won by TKO in 10th round.
