= 2016 Regional League Division 2 =

- Season: 2016
- Promoted: Trat; Kasetsart; Nongbua Pitchaya
- Matches: 24
- Goals: 51 (2.13 per match)
- Top goalscorer: Behshad Yavarzadeh; Supot Jodjam (3 Goals)
- Biggest home win: Samut Sakhon 4–0 Ubon Ratchathani (24 September 2016)
- Biggest away win: Chamchuri United 0–2 Kasetsart (25 September 2016)
- Highest scoring: Udon Thani 4–3 Nongbua Pitchaya (8 October 2016); Surat Thani 4–3 Kamphaengphet (9 October 2016)
- Highest attendance: 4,756; Udon Thani 4–3 Nongbua Pitchaya (8 October 2016)
- Lowest attendance: 385; Kasetsart 1–2 Chamchuri United (18 September 2016)
- Total attendance: 37,743
- Average attendance: 1,572

The 2016 Regional League Division 2 (also known as the AIS League Division 2 for sponsorship reasons) was the 11th season of the Regional League Division 2, it had redirected from the division 2, since its establishment in 2006. The 94 clubs will be divided into 8 groups (regions).

== 2016 Regional League stage table All locations ==
Locations of the 2016 Regional League Division 2 All Teams
2016 Regional League Division 2 Bangkok & field Region
2016 Regional League Division 2 Bangkok & Eastern Region
2016 Regional League Division 2 Central Region
2016 Regional League Division 2 Eastern Region
2016 Regional League Division 2 Western Region
2016 Regional League Division 2 Northern Region
2016 Regional League Division 2 North Eastern Region
2016 Regional League Division 2 Southern Region

=== 2016 ===
Red Zone : 2016 Regional League Division 2 Bangkok Metropolitan Region
Cyan Zone : 2016 Regional League Division 2 Bangkok & Eastern Region
Purple Zone: 2016 Regional League Division 2 Central Region
Yellow Zone : 2016 Regional League Division 2 Eastern Region
Pink Zone: 2016 Regional League Division 2 Western Region
Green Zone: 2016 Regional League Division 2 Northern Region
Orange Zone: 2016 Regional League Division 2 North Eastern Region
Blue Zone: 2016 Regional League Division 2 Southern Region

=== List of Qualified Teams ===
Bangkok & field (2)

- Chamchuri United (Winner)
- Kasetsart (Runner-up)

Bangkok & Eastern (2)

- Rajpracha (Winner)
- MOF Customs United (Runner-up)

Central (2)

- Ayutthaya Warrior (Winner)
- Ayutthaya (Runner-up)

Eastern (2)

- Trat (Winner)
- Chachoengsao Hi-Tek (Runner-up)

Western (2)

- Samut Sakhon (Winner)
- Krung Thonburi (Runner-up)

Northern (2)

- Nongbua Pitchaya (Winner)
- Kamphaengphet (Runner-up)

North Eastern (2)

- Udon Thani (Winner)
- Ubon Ratchathani (Runner-up)

Southern (2)

- Surat Thani (Winner)
- Nara United (Runner-up)
Football clubs in Bangkok Metropolitan Region

== Champions League Knockout stage ==
=== Stadium and locations ===
Locations of the Thai Regional League Division 2 2016 Champions League Knockout stage teams

Team	Location	Stadium	Capacity
Ayutthaya	Phra Nakhon Si Ayutthaya	Ratchakram Stadium	1,000
Ayutthaya Warrior	Phra Nakhon Si Ayutthaya	Ayutthaya Provincial Stadium	6,000
Chachoengsao Hi-Tek	Chachoengsao	Chachoengsao Town municipality Stadium	6,000
Chamchuri United	Bangkok	Chulalongkorn University Stadium	20,000
Kamphaengphet	Kamphaengphet	Kamphaengphet Provincial Administrative Organization Stadium	2,500
Kasetsart	Bangkok	Insi Chandrasatitya Stadium	4,000
Krung Thonburi	Nakhon Pathom	Mahidol University Salaya Campus Stadium	2,000
MOF Customs United	Samut Prakan	Ladkrabang 54 Stadium	2,000
Nara United	Narathiwat	Narathiwat Provincial Administrative Organization Stadium	3,000
Nongbua Pitchaya	Nongbua Lamphu	Nongbua Lamphu Provincial Stadium	6,000
Rajpracha	Bangkok	King Mongkut's Institute of Technology Ladkrabang Stadium	3,500
Samut Sakhon	Samut Sakhon	Samut Sakhon Provincial Stadium	3,500
Surat Thani	Surat Thani	Surat Thani Provincial Stadium	10,000
Trat	Trat	Trat Provincial Stadium	5,000
Ubon Ratchathani	Ubon Ratchathani	Ubon Rachathani Sports School Stadium	3,000
Udon Thani	Udon Thani	Udon Thani Rajabhat University Stadium	3,500

Football clubs in Greater Bangkok

=== Bracket ===
Round of 16
Ubon Ratchathani	0	0	0
Samut Sakhon	1	4	5
Trat	3	1	4
Chachoengsao Hi-Tek	1	0	1
Ayutthaya	0	2	2
Nongbua Pitchaya	1	2	3
Nara United	0	0	0
Udon Thani	0	3	3
Kasetsart	1	2	3
Chamchuri United	2	0	2
MOF Customs United	0	1	1 (4)
Rajpracha (p)	0	1	1 (5)
Ayutthaya Warrior	2	0	2
Kamphaengphet (a)	2	0	2
Krung Thonburi	0	0	0
Surat Thani	0	2	2

Quarter-finals
Samut Sakhon	1	0	1
Trat	0	2	2
Nongbua Pitchaya (a)	1	3	4
Udon Thani	0	4	4
Kasetsart	0	1	1
Rajpracha	0	0	0
Kamphaengphet	0	3	3
Surat Thani	1	4	5

Semi-finals
Trat (1st)	–	–	–
Nongbua Pitchaya (3rd)	–	–	–
Kasetsart (2nd)	–	–	–
Surat Thani (4th)	–	–	–

Final
Cancelled	–	–	–
Cancelled	–	–	–

=== Round of 16 ===
Team 1	Agg.	Team 2	1st leg	2nd leg
Line A
Ubon Ratchathani	0–5	Samut Sakhon	0–1	0–4
Trat	4–1	Chachoengsao Hi-Tek	3–1	1–0
Ayutthaya	2–3	Nongbua Pitchaya	0–1	2–2
Nara United	0–3	Udon Thani	0–0	0–3 (a.e.t.)
Line B
Kasetsart	3–2	Chamchuri United	1–2	2–0
MOF Customs United	1–1 (4–5 p)	Rajpracha	0–0	1–1 (a.e.t.)
Ayutthaya Warrior	2–2 (a)	Kamphaengphet	2–2	0–0
Krung Thonburi	0–2	Surat Thani	0–0	0–2

==== Line A ====
17 September 2016
18:00 UTC+7

Ubon Ratchathani	0 – 1	Samut Sakhon
	Report	Santiphap Ratniyom 80'

Ubon Rachathani Sports School Stadium, Ubon Ratchathani
Attendance: 500
Referee: Kritsada Loungyos (Thailand)
24 September 2016
18:00 UTC+7

Samut Sakhon	4 – 0	Ubon Ratchathani
Togbe Marcel 31'; Aliou Seck 55' (pen.); Apollon Ashkanov 88'; Kaung Sett Naing 90+3'	Report

Samut Sakhon Provincial Stadium, Samut Sakhon
Attendance: 1,839
Referee: Sakchai Fakthuen (Thailand)

Samut Sakhon won 5–0 on aggregate.

17 September 2016
18:00 UTC+7

Trat	3 – 1	Chachoengsao Hi-Tek
Andre Araujo 6'; Tinnapob Srisathit 53'	Report	Jiraphat Kamon 53' (o.g.); Tiwa Saengsomboon 88'

Trat Provincial Stadium, Trat
Attendance: 1,189
Referee: Prakit Sukyang (Thailand)
24 September 2016
18:30 UTC+7

Chachoengsao Hi-Tek	0 – 1	Trat
	Report	Jirawut Saranan 85'

Chachoengsao Town municipality Stadium, Chachoengsao
Attendance: 1,769
Referee: Kritsada Loungyos (Thailand)

Trat won 4–1 on aggregate.

17 September 2016
18:00 UTC+7

Ayutthaya	0 – 1	Nongbua Pitchaya
	Report	Banluesak Yodyingyong 78'

Ratchakram Stadium, Phra Nakhon Si Ayutthaya
Attendance: 928
Referee: Suwat Wongsuwan (Thailand)
24 September 2016
17:00 UTC+7

Nongbua Pitchaya	2 – 2	Ayutthaya
Banluesak Yodyingyong 4'; Dai Min-Joo 90+4'	Report	Kendall Jagdeosingh 11'; Suphan Hardkam 90+6'

Nongbua Lamphu Provincial Stadium, Nongbua Lamphu
Attendance: 1,370
Referee: Payukij Kijcharoen (Thailand)

Nongbua Pitchaya won 3–2 on aggregate.

17 September 2016
16:30 UTC+7

Nara United	0 – 0	Udon Thani
	Report

Narathiwat Provincial Administrative Organization Stadium, Narathiwat
Attendance: 1,800
Referee: Chaiwat Narotamangkoon (Thailand)
24 September 2016
18:00 UTC+7

Udon Thani	3 – 0 (a.e.t.)	Nara United
Behshad Yavarzadeh 108'; Natthaphat Somsri 113'; Melvin Kicmett 114'	Report

Udon Thani Rajabhat University Stadium, Udon Thani
Attendance: 4,500
Referee: Anuphong Duangsri (Thailand)

Udon Thani won 3–0 on aggregate.

==== Line B ====
18 September 2016
17:00 UTC+7

Kasetsart	1 – 2	Chamchuri United
Tanaset Jintapaputanasiri 17'	Report	Bamba Messi 11'; Valery Hiek 78'

Insi Chandrasatitya Stadium, Bangkok
Attendance: 385
Referee: Thaksin Kaewloma (Thailand)
25 September 2016
17:00 UTC+7

Chamchuri United	0 – 2	Kasetsart
	Report	Jonathan Ferreira Reis 26', 70'

Chulalongkorn University Stadium, Bangkok
Attendance: 400
Referee: Wisawet Sangnakhon (Thailand)

Kasetsart won 3–2 on aggregate.

18 September 2016
18:00 UTC+7

MOF Customs United	0 – 0	Rajpracha
	Report

Ladkrabang 54 Stadium, Samut Prakan
Attendance: 438
Referee: Kasama Loyma (Thailand)
25 September 2016
16:00 UTC+7

Rajpracha	1 – 1 (a.e.t.)	MOF Customs United
Salla Abdouku 101'	Report	Fabricio Peris Carneiro 99'
Penalties
Phinit Chaichana (penalty scored); Huung Ho-choi (penalty scored); Rewat Meerian (penalty scored); Nwabueze Okechukwu (penalty scored); Zalla Abdoukwu (penalty scored)	5–4	(penalty scored) Teerayut Ngamlamai; (penalty scored) Sutin Aiemsa-ad; (penalty scored) Saran Samingchai; (penalty scored) Fabricio Peris Carneiro; (penalty missed) Apinat Trongsri

King Mongkut's Institute of Technology Ladkrabang Stadium, Bangkok
Attendance: 500
Referee: Chaiyaporn Yongsaeng (Thailand)

1–1 on aggregate. Rajpracha won 5–4 on penalties.

18 September 2016
18:00 UTC+7

Ayutthaya Warrior	2 – 2	Kamphaengphet
Joo Sung-hwan 62'; Kim Mun-ju 63'; Pirach Limkiatsathaporn 69' (o.g.)	Report	Nattapong Sudjai 18'

Ayutthaya Provincial Stadium, Phra Nakhon Si Ayutthaya
Attendance: 1,999
Referee: Kraiwut Klinpoon (Thailand)
25 September 2016
16:00 UTC+7

Kamphaengphet	0 – 0	Ayutthaya Warrior
	Report

Kamphaengphet Provincial Administrative Organization Stadium, Kamphaengphet
Attendance: 2,100
Referee: Torphong Somsing (Thailand)

2–2 on aggregate. Kamphaengphet won on away goals.

18 September 2016
16:00 UTC+7

Krung Thonburi	0 – 0	Surat Thani
	Report

Mahidol University Salaya Campus Stadium, Nakhon Pathom
Attendance: 396
Referee: Naruphon Sawasdee (Thailand)
25 September 2016
18:00 UTC+7

Surat Thani	2 – 0	Krung Thonburi
Supot Jodjam 18'; Veerasak Jee-un 85'	Report

Surat Thani Provincial Stadium, Surat Thani
Attendance: 1,100
Referee: Soraphong Krainet (Thailand)

Surat Thani won 2–0 on aggregate.

=== Quarter-finals ===
Team 1	Agg.	Team 2	1st leg	2nd leg
Line A
Samut Sakhon	1–2	Trat	1–0	0–2
Nongbua Pitchaya	4–4 (a)	Udon Thani	1–0	3–4
Line B
Kasetsart	1–0	Rajpracha	0–0	1–0
Kamphaengphet	3–5	Surat Thani	0–1	3–4

==== Line A ====
1 October 2016
18:00 UTC+7

Samut Sakhon	1 – 0	Trat
Aliou Seck 90+4'	Report

Samut Sakhon Provincial Stadium, Samut Sakhon
Attendance: 1,985
Referee: Dusit Aiemsakul (Thailand)
8 October 2016
18:00 UTC+7

Trat	2 – 0	Samut Sakhon
Andre Araujo 5'; Erivaldo Oliveira 52'	Report

Trat Provincial Stadium, Trat
Attendance: 1,576
Referee: Alongkorn Feemuechang (Thailand)

Trat won 2–1 on aggregate.

1 October 2016
17:00 UTC+7

Nongbua Pitchaya	1 – 0	Udon Thani
Uthai Piw-ngern 83'	Report

Nongbua Lamphu Provincial Stadium, Nongbua Lamphu
Attendance: 3,383
Referee: Sahaphop Sribunlue (Thailand)
8 October 2016
18:00 UTC+7

Udon Thani	4 – 3	Nongbua Pitchaya
Behshad Yavarzadeh 5' (pen.), 27' (pen.); Melvin Kicmett 57'; Kittipong Wongma 77'	Report	Dai Min-Joo 62'; Victor Mensah 90'

Udon Thani Rajabhat University Stadium, Udon Thani
Attendance: 4,756
Referee: Phummarin Kamreun (Thailand)

4–4 on aggregate. Nongbua Pitchaya won on away goals.

==== Line B ====
2 October 2016
17:00 UTC+7

Kasetsart	0 – 0	Rajpracha
	Report

Insi Chandrasatitya Stadium, Bangkok
Attendance: 620
Referee: Suwat Wongsuwan (Thailand)
9 October 2016
16:00 UTC+7

Rajpracha	0 – 1	Kasetsart
	Report	Huỳnh Kesley Alves 50'

Bangkok University Stadium, Pathum Thani
Attendance: 600
Referee: Vichet Thientong (Thailand)

Kasetsart won 1–0 on aggregate.

2 October 2016
16:00 UTC+7

Kamphaengphet	0 – 1	Surat Thani
	Report	Seo Yong-kyun 90+1'

Kamphaengphet Provincial Administrative Organization Stadium, Kamphaengphet
Attendance: 1,610
Referee: Bundit Kamkom (Thailand)
9 October 2016
18:00 UTC+7

Surat Thani	4 – 3	Kamphaengphet
Supot Jodjam 37', 78'; Anoyo Cosmos Onuora 43'; Gueye holmes monetty Serge 65'	Report	Aaron Evans 41', 85' (pen.); Thanadol Taisang 76'

Surat Thani Provincial Stadium, Surat Thani
Attendance: 2,000
Referee: Chaireok Ngamsom (Thailand)

Surat Thani won 5–3 on aggregate.

=== Final ===
Following the death of King Bhumibol Adulyadej, the Football Association of Thailand cancelled the remaining league season on 14 October 2016. Last 4 teams of the 2016 Regional League Division 2 Champions League round had drawn to ranked for promoted to the 2017 Thai League Division 1. They had ranked on October 20, 2016.

- Trat
- Nongbua Pitchaya
- Kasetsart
- Surat Thani

==== Results ====
Pos	Team	Qualification or relegation
1	Trat	Promotion to 2017 Thai League 2
2	Kasetsart	Promotion to 2017 Thai League 2
3	Nongbua Pitchaya	Promotion to 2017 Thai League 2
4	Surat Thani	

== See also ==
- 2016 Thai League
- 2016 Thai Division 1 League
- 2016 Football Division 3
- 2016 Thai FA Cup
- 2016 Thai League Cup
- 2016 Kor Royal Cup
