= 2017 Thai League 3 Upper Region =

2017 T3 Upper Region
- Season: 2017
- Champions: Khonkaen
- Promoted: Khonkaen; Udon Thani
- Relegated: Singburi Bangrajun
- Matches: 182
- Goals: 477 (2.62 per match)
- Top goalscorer: (South Korea) Kim Ji-hun (19 goals)
- Biggest home win: 6 goals Udon Thani 6–0 Singburi Bangrajun (16 July 2017)
- Biggest away win: 5 goals Kalasin 0–5 Ayutthaya (12 March 2017)
- Highest scoring: 7 goals Ubon Ratchathani 3–4 Chachoengsao (12 February 2017); Ubon Ratchathani 4–3 Kamphaengphet (9 September 2017)
- Longest winning run: 8 matches Khonkaen; Phrae United
- Longest unbeaten run: 17 matches Khonkaen
- Longest winless run: 21 matches Singburi Bangrajun
- Longest losing run: 6 matches Ubon Ratchathani
- Highest attendance: 5,180; Khonkaen 2–0 Udon Thani (29 July 2017)
- Lowest attendance: 35; Amnat United 3–2 Sakaeo (26 August 2017)
- Total attendance: 177,915
- Average attendance: 999

2017 Thai League 3 Upper Region was the 1st edition of the Thai football league. It is a part of the Thai League 3 and the feeder league for the Thai League 2. A total of 14 teams contested the league ti tle that season, after Prachinburi United failed in getting a licence for the league and Phichit withdrew before the season start.

== Changes from last season ==
=== Team changes ===
==== Promoted clubs ====
Four club was promoted from the 2016 Thai Division 2 League Northern Region

- Kamphaeng Phet
- Phrae United
- Phayao
- Lamphun Warrior

Five club was promoted from the 2016 Thai Division 2 League North Eastern Region

- Udon Thani
- Ubon Ratchathani
- Kalasin
- Khon Kaen
- Amnat Poly United

Four club was promoted from the 2016 Thai Division 2 League Central Region

- Ayutthaya Warrior
- Ayutthaya
- Singburi Bang Rachan
- Ayutthaya United

Three club was promoted from the 2016 Thai Division 2 League Central Region

- Cha Choeng Sao
- Prachinburi United
- Sa Kaeo

==== Renamed clubs ====
- Phichit authorize from Ayutthaya Warrior because Phichit is an absolute football club quota.

==== Withdrawn clubs ====
- Phichit is taking a 1-year break. This team was automatically banned 2 years, did not get subsidy and relegated to 2019 Thai League 4 Northern Region.

=== Expansion clubs ===
- Prachinburi United Club-licensing football club did not pass to play 2017 Thai League 3 Upper Region. This team was relegated to 2017 Thai League 4 Eastern Region again.

== Teams ==
=== Stadium and locations ===
Locations of the Thai League 3 Upper region in 2017
2017 Thai League 3 Upper Region

| Team | Location | Stadium | Capacity |
|---|---|---|---|
| Amnat United | Amnat Charoen | Amnat Charoen Provincial Stadium | 2,500 |
| Ayutthaya | Ayutthaya | Udhomseelwitthaya School Stadium | 1,800 |
| Ayutthaya United | Ayutthaya | Senabodee Stadium (Until 11 February 2017); Ayutthaya Provincial Stadium (Since 4 March 2017) | 2,500; 6,000 |
| Chachoengsao | Chachoengsao | Chachoengsao Municipality Stadium | 6,000 |
| Kalasin | Kalasin | Kalasin Municipality Stadium | 2,580 |
| Kamphaengphet | Kamphaengphet | Cha Kung Rao Stadium | 2,600 |
| Khonkaen | Khonkaen | Khonkaen PAO. Stadium | 8,000 |
| Lamphun Warrior | Lamphun | Mae-Guang Stadium | 3,000 |
| Phayao | Phayao | Phayao Provincial Stadium | 6,000 |
| Phrae United | Phrae | Thunghong Municipality Stadium | 4,500 |
| Sakaeo | Sakaeo | Sakaeo PAO. Stadium | 10,000 |
| Singburi Bangrajun | Singburi | Singburi Provincial Stadium | 4,000 |
| Ubon Ratchathani | Ubon Ratchathani | Ubon Ratchathani University Stadium | 2,000 |
| Udon Thani | Udon Thani | Udon Thani Rajabhat University Stadium | 4,500 |

=== Sponsoring ===
| Team | Kit manufacturer | Shirt sponsor |
|---|---|---|
| Amnat United | Warrix | PP Concrete |
| Ayutthaya | Deffo | Gulf |
| Ayutthaya United | Pegan Sport | Gulf |
| Chachoengsao | Mawin | HI-TEK |
| Kalasin | Spicer | Traill Sports |
| Kamphaengphet | KELA | Chang |
| Khonkaen | Grand Sport | Leo Beer |
| Lamphun Warrior | Made by club | Betagro |
| Phayao | FBT | Chang |
| Phrae United | Made by club | Samart |
| Sakaeo | FBT | Wangnamyen Dairy Cooperative Limited |
| Singburi Bangrajun | S'DiO | Singha Corporation |
| Ubon Ratchathani | Orca Sport | Toyota Deeyiam |
| Udon Thani | Warrix | Leo Beer |

=== Foreign players ===
| Other foreign players. |
| AFC quota players. |
| ASEAN quota players. |
| No foreign player registered. |

The number of foreign players is restricted to five per T3 team. A team can use five foreign players on the field in each game, including at least one player from the AFC member countries and one player from nine countries member of ASEAN (3+1+1).

Note :
(substituted off) : players who released during summer transfer window;
(substituted in) : players who registered during summer transfer window.

| Club | Leg | Player 1 | Player 2 | Player 3 | Player 4 | Player 5 |
|---|---|---|---|---|---|---|
| Amnat United | First | | (Cameroon) Zefor Angwafor | (Cameroon) Ngono Victor Yves | (Ghana) Victor Mensah | (South Korea) Hong Sang-won |
| Amnat United | Second | (Japan) Tomohiro Onodera (substituted in) | (Cameroon) Zefor Angwafor | (Cameroon) Ngono Victor Yves | (Ghana) Victor Mensah | (South Korea) Hong Sang-won |
| Ayutthaya | First | (Ivory Coast) Nassar David Raheem (substituted off) | (Nigeria) Martin Amara Jerry (substituted off) | (Ivory Coast) Valery Djomon | (South Korea) Joo Sung-hwan | (South Korea) Kim Ji-hun |
| Ayutthaya | Second | (Ivory Coast) Diomande Mouty (substituted in) | (Ivory Coast) Bamba Karamoko Jr. (substituted in) | (Ivory Coast) Valery Djomon | (South Korea) Joo Sung-hwan | (South Korea) Kim Ji-hun |
| Ayutthaya United | First | (Ivory Coast) Diomande Mouty (substituted off) | (Guinea) Diabate Ibrahima (substituted off) | (Brazil) Fabricio Peris Carneiro | (Trinidad and Tobago) Kendall Jagdeosingh | (Japan) Kentaro Takamatsu |
| Ayutthaya United | Second | (Senegal) Aliou Seck (substituted in) | (Zambia) Noah Chivuta (substituted in) | (Brazil) Fabricio Peris Carneiro | (Trinidad and Tobago) Kendall Jagdeosingh | (Japan) Kentaro Takamatsu |
| Chachoengsao | First | | (United States) Jonny Campbell | (Cameroon) Thierry Tchobe | (Cameroon) Nyamsi Jacques | |
| Chachoengsao | Second | (Australia) Joshua Jokic (substituted in) | (United States) Jonny Campbell | (Cameroon) Thierry Tchobe | (Cameroon) Nyamsi Jacques | |
| Kalasin | First | (Cameroon) Mbotto Lambert (substituted off) | (Ghana) Joseph Amponsah (substituted off) | (Brazil) Caio Rodrigues | (Uganda) Martin Muwanga | (Japan) Ozaki Hideto |
| Kalasin | Second | | (Laos) Phathana Phommathep (substituted in) | (Brazil) Caio Rodrigues | (Uganda) Martin Muwanga | (Japan) Ozaki Hideto |
| Kamphaengphet | First | (Brazil) Vinicius Silva | (Cameroon) Njifon Abdouramani | (Japan) Ozu Kazutaka | (Japan) Kiyotake Kakyo | (South Korea) Kim Ki-hwan |
| Kamphaengphet | Second | (Brazil) Vinicius Silva | (Cameroon) Njifon Abdouramani | (Japan) Ozu Kazutaka | (Japan) Kiyotake Kakyo | (South Korea) Kim Ki-hwan |
| Khonkaen | First | (Nigeria) Opeyemi Ajayi Korede (substituted off) | (Brazil) Paulo Martins (substituted off) | (North Macedonia) Darko Tasevski | (Japan) Takamitsu Yoshino | (Australia) Richard Cardozo |
| Khonkaen | Second | (France) Romain Gasmi (substituted in) | (South Korea) Kim Seong-hyeon (substituted in) | (North Macedonia) Darko Tasevski | (Japan) Takamitsu Yoshino | (Australia) Richard Cardozo |
| Lamphun Warrior | First | | (Senegal) Aliou Seck (substituted off) | (South Korea) Jang Gyu-hyeon (substituted off) | (Ghana) Emmanuel Wango | |
| Lamphun Warrior | Second | (Ghana) Nelson Kasum (substituted in) | (Guinea) Diabate Ibrahima (substituted in) | (South Korea) Kim Young-kwang (substituted in) | (Ghana) Emmanuel Wango | |
| Phayao | First | (Cameroon) Armand Mefire (substituted off) | (Ghana) Jamal Amidu (substituted off) | (Liberia) Melvin Kicmett (substituted off) | (Japan) Unno Tomoyuki (substituted off) | (Japan) Daiki Okamoto |
| Phayao | Second | | | | | (Japan) Daiki Okamoto |
| Phrae United | First | | (Nigeria) Efe Obode (substituted off) | (Japan) Atsushi Takahashi (substituted off) | (Ivory Coast) Nenebi Tra Sylvestre | (Cameroon) Ndengue Dieudonne |
| Phrae United | Second | (Brazil) Nelisson Teles (substituted in) | (Japan) Yuta Nakagaito (substituted in) | (South Korea) Lee Han-kuk (substituted in) | (Ivory Coast) Nenebi Tra Sylvestre | (Cameroon) Ndengue Dieudonne |
| Sakaeo | First | (Ghana) Dennis Borketey (substituted off) | (Ghana) Edmund Borketey (substituted off) | (Ghana) Alex Tawiah (substituted off) | (Ghana) Jordan Opoku (substituted off) | (Ghana) Michael Denteh |
| Sakaeo | Second | | | (Ghana) Isaac Oduro (substituted in) | (Ghana) Awuakye Seth (substituted in) | (Ghana) Michael Denteh |
| Singburi Bangrajun | First | (Japan) Takaya Sugasawa (substituted off) | (Japan) Ryota Noda (substituted off) | (Japan) Enjo Kensuke | (Japan) Kai Tomoki | (Japan) Shota Wada |
| Singburi Bangrajun | Second | (Nigeria) Ezeofor Chimaroke Odiri (substituted in) | (South Korea) Jang Gyu-hyeon (substituted in) | (Japan) Enjo Kensuke | (Japan) Kai Tomoki | (Japan) Shota Wada |
| Ubon Ratchathani | First | (Brazil) Rodrigo Silva (substituted off) | (Egypt) Ahmed Safwat (substituted off) | (Brazil) Alex de Avila | (Cameroon) Paul Ekollo | (Cameroon) Bouba Abbo |
| Ubon Ratchathani | Second | (Brazil) Alaan Bruno de Sousa (substituted in) | (South Korea) Yang Kwang-hyun (substituted in) | (Brazil) Alex de Avila | (Cameroon) Paul Ekollo | (Cameroon) Bouba Abbo |
| Udon Thani | First | (Brazil) Dudu Lima (substituted off) | (Brazil) Valci Júnior | (Ivory Coast) Ali Diarra | (Cameroon) Florent Obama | (Japan) Hironori Saruta |
| Udon Thani | Second | (Japan) Sho Shimoji (substituted in) | (Brazil) Valci Júnior | (Ivory Coast) Ali Diarra | (Cameroon) Florent Obama | (Japan) Hironori Saruta |

== League table ==
=== Standings ===
| Pos | Team | Pld | W | D | L | GF | GA | GD | Pts | Qualification or relegation |
|---|---|---|---|---|---|---|---|---|---|---|
| 1 | Khonkaen (P) | 26 | 18 | 5 | 3 | 53 | 18 | +35 | 59 | Promotion to 2018 Thai League 2 |
| 2 | Udon Thani (Q, P) | 26 | 15 | 7 | 4 | 43 | 18 | +25 | 52 (Note: Udon Thani ahead on head-to-head record; Udon Thani 4 pts, Ayutthaya 1 pt.) | Qualification to Promotion Play-offs |
| 3 | Ayutthaya | 26 | 16 | 4 | 6 | 43 | 25 | +18 | 52 | |
| 4 | Ayutthaya United | 26 | 14 | 5 | 7 | 40 | 26 | +14 | 47 | |
| 5 | Phayao | 26 | 10 | 6 | 10 | 32 | 35 | −3 | 36 | |
| 6 | Phrae United | 26 | 10 | 5 | 11 | 31 | 32 | −1 | 35 | |
| 7 | Chachoengsao | 26 | 10 | 4 | 12 | 42 | 38 | +4 | 34 (Note: Head-to-head record (Mini league): Kalasin 6 pts, Chachoengsao 6 pts and Sakaeo 6 pts were equivalent. Chachoengsao ahead on overall goals difference; Chachoengsao +4, Sakaeo -2 and Kalasin -6) | |
| 8 | Sakaeo | 26 | 9 | 7 | 10 | 35 | 37 | −2 | 34 | |
| 9 | Kalasin | 26 | 10 | 4 | 12 | 34 | 40 | −6 | 34 | |
| 10 | Amnat United | 26 | 9 | 6 | 11 | 31 | 39 | −8 | 33 | |
| 11 | Kamphaengphet | 26 | 6 | 9 | 11 | 21 | 34 | −13 | 27 (Note: Kamphaengphet ahead on head-to-head record; Kamphaengphet 4 pts, Lamphun Warrior 1 pt.) | |
| 12 | Lamphun Warrior | 26 | 7 | 6 | 13 | 22 | 31 | −9 | 27 | |
| 13 | Ubon Ratchathani | 26 | 6 | 8 | 12 | 36 | 47 | −11 | 26 | |
| 14 | Singburi Bangrajun (R) | 26 | 1 | 6 | 19 | 14 | 57 | −43 | 9 | Relegation to 2018 Thai League 4 |

Updated to match(es) played on 16 September 2017. Source: Thai League 3
Rules for classification: 1) Points; 2) Head-to-head points; 3) Head-to-head goals difference; 4) Head-to-head goals scored; 5) Overall goals difference; 6) Overall goals scored; 7) Fair play points; 8) Play-off without extra time;).
(P) Promoted; (Q) Qualified for the phase indicated; (R) Relegated

=== Positions by round ===
| Leader and promotion to the 2018 Thai League 2 |
| Qualification for Thai League 3 Play-offs |
| Relegation to the 2018 Thai League 4 |

The table lists the positions of teams after each week of matches. In order to preserve chronological evolvements, any postponed matches are not included in the round at which they were originally scheduled, but added to the full round they were played immediately afterwards. For example, if a match is scheduled for matchday 13, but then postponed and played between days 16 and 17, it will be added to the standings for day 16.

| Team ╲ Round | 1 | 2 | 3 | 4 | 5 | 6 | 7 | 8 | 9 | 10 | 11 | 12 | 13 | 14 | 15 | 16 | 17 | 18 | 19 | 20 | 21 | 22 | 23 | 24 | 25 | 26 |
|---|---|---|---|---|---|---|---|---|---|---|---|---|---|---|---|---|---|---|---|---|---|---|---|---|---|---|
| Khonkaen | 7 | 10 | 6 | 8 | 8 | 7 | 6 | 4 | 2 | 2 | 3 | 2 | 2 | 2 | 1 | 1 | 1 | 1 | 1 | 1 | 1 | 1 | 1 | 1 | 1 | 1 |
| Udon Thani | 5 | 2 | 5 | 4 | 2 | 4 | 5 | 5 | 5 | 4 | 2 | 4 | 4 | 4 | 4 | 3 | 2 | 2 | 2 | 2 | 3 | 2 | 2 | 2 | 2 | 2 |
| Ayutthaya | 6 | 13 | 7 | 5 | 4 | 3 | 2 | 2 | 3 | 5 | 4 | 3 | 3 | 3 | 5 | 5 | 5 | 4 | 3 | 3 | 2 | 4 | 3 | 3 | 3 | 3 |
| Ayutthaya United | 1 | 4 | 2 | 7 | 6 | 5 | 4 | 6 | 6 | 6 | 6 | 6 | 5 | 5 | 3 | 4 | 4 | 5 | 4 | 4 | 4 | 3 | 4 | 4 | 4 | 4 |
| Phayao | 14 | 7 | 3 | 2 | 5 | 6 | 7 | 7 | 7 | 7 | 8 | 8 | 9 | 8 | 7 | 8 | 8 | 9 | 11 | 7 | 7 | 7 | 7 | 7 | 6 | 5 |
| Phrae United | 4 | 1 | 1 | 1 | 1 | 1 | 1 | 1 | 1 | 1 | 1 | 1 | 1 | 1 | 2 | 2 | 3 | 3 | 5 | 5 | 5 | 5 | 5 | 5 | 5 | 6 |
| Kalasin | 12 | 6 | 11 | 10 | 11 | 10 | 11 | 8 | 9 | 11 | 12 | 12 | 11 | 11 | 10 | 9 | 9 | 7 | 6 | 6 | 6 | 6 | 6 | 6 | 8 | 7 |
| Chachoengsao | 2 | 5 | 10 | 11 | 12 | 12 | 12 | 12 | 12 | 12 | 9 | 7 | 7 | 7 | 6 | 6 | 6 | 6 | 7 | 8 | 10 | 8 | 8 | 8 | 9 | 8 |
| Sakaeo | 13 | 12 | 9 | 6 | 7 | 8 | 9 | 10 | 10 | 9 | 11 | 11 | 8 | 10 | 11 | 11 | 12 | 11 | 8 | 9 | 11 | 9 | 10 | 9 | 7 | 9 |
| Amnat United | 11 | 11 | 13 | 13 | 10 | 11 | 10 | 11 | 11 | 10 | 7 | 9 | 10 | 9 | 9 | 10 | 11 | 12 | 12 | 12 | 8 | 10 | 9 | 10 | 10 | 10 |
| Kamphaengphet | 3 | 8 | 4 | 3 | 3 | 2 | 3 | 3 | 4 | 3 | 5 | 5 | 6 | 6 | 8 | 7 | 7 | 8 | 9 | 10 | 9 | 11 | 11 | 12 | 13 | 11 |
| Lamphun Warrior | 8 | 3 | 8 | 9 | 9 | 9 | 8 | 9 | 8 | 8 | 10 | 10 | 12 | 12 | 13 | 13 | 13 | 13 | 13 | 13 | 13 | 13 | 12 | 11 | 11 | 12 |
| Ubon Ratchathani | 10 | 14 | 14 | 14 | 14 | 14 | 14 | 14 | 14 | 13 | 13 | 13 | 13 | 13 | 12 | 12 | 10 | 10 | 10 | 11 | 12 | 12 | 13 | 13 | 12 | 13 |
| Singburi Bangrajun | 9 | 9 | 12 | 12 | 13 | 13 | 13 | 13 | 13 | 14 | 14 | 14 | 14 | 14 | 14 | 14 | 14 | 14 | 14 | 14 | 14 | 14 | 14 | 14 | 14 | 14 |

Source: Thai League 3

=== Results by match played ===
| Team ╲ Round | 1 | 2 | 3 | 4 | 5 | 6 | 7 | 8 | 9 | 10 | 11 | 12 | 13 | 14 | 15 | 16 | 17 | 18 | 19 | 20 | 21 | 22 | 23 | 24 | 25 | 26 |
|---|---|---|---|---|---|---|---|---|---|---|---|---|---|---|---|---|---|---|---|---|---|---|---|---|---|---|
| Khonkaen | D | D | W | L | L | W | W | W | W | W | D | W | W | W | W | W | W | W | W | D | W | W | L | W | D | W |
| Udon Thani | W | W | L | W | W | D | L | D | W | W | W | L | W | D | D | W | W | W | L | W | D | W | D | W | W | D |
| Ayutthaya | D | L | W | W | W | W | W | D | L | L | W | W | W | D | L | L | W | W | W | W | W | L | W | D | W | W |
| Ayutthaya United | W | L | W | L | W | D | W | L | W | L | L | W | W | W | W | D | W | L | W | D | W | W | L | W | D | D |
| Phayao | L | W | W | W | D | L | L | L | W | L | D | D | L | W | W | L | D | L | L | W | W | L | W | D | W | D |
| Phrae United | W | W | W | W | W | W | W | W | D | D | W | W | L | L | D | D | L | L | L | L | D | L | L | L | L | L |
| Kalasin | L | W | L | D | L | W | L | W | L | L | D | L | W | L | W | W | L | W | W | W | D | L | W | L | L | D |
| Chachoengsao | W | L | L | L | L | L | W | D | D | D | W | W | L | W | W | W | L | L | L | L | L | W | W | L | D | W |
| Sakaeo | L | D | W | W | D | L | L | D | L | W | L | L | W | L | L | D | D | W | W | D | L | W | L | W | W | D |
| Amnat United | L | D | L | L | W | L | W | D | D | W | W | L | L | W | L | L | L | L | W | D | W | L | W | D | D | W |
| Kamphaengphet | W | L | W | W | W | W | L | D | D | W | L | L | D | L | L | D | D | L | L | D | D | L | D | L | L | D |
| Lamphun Warrior | D | W | L | D | L | W | L | D | W | L | L | D | L | L | L | L | D | W | L | D | L | W | W | W | L | L |
| Ubon Ratchathani | L | L | L | L | L | L | D | D | L | W | D | D | D | W | W | D | W | W | D | L | L | L | L | D | W | L |
| Singburi Bangrajun | D | D | L | L | L | L | D | L | L | L | L | D | L | L | L | D | L | L | D | L | L | W | L | L | L | L |

Source: Thai League 3
W = Win; D = Draw; L = Loss

=== Results ===
| Home \ Away | ANU | AYU | AYUU | CCS | KAL | KAM | KHO | LPW | PAYO | PRU | SAK | SBB | UBR | UDT |
|---|---|---|---|---|---|---|---|---|---|---|---|---|---|---|
| Amnat United | | 1–2 | 3–3 | 1–0 | 0–1 | 0–0 | 0–1 | 2–1 | 3–2 | 1–2 | 3–2 | 3–0 | 1–5 | 0–1 |
| Ayutthaya | 2–2 | | 2–1 | 2–2 | 2–1 | 2–0 | 3–1 | 1–0 | 3–1 | 1–0 | 1–2 | 0–0 | 2–3 | 0–0 |
| Ayutthaya United | 3–0 | 0–2 | | 1–0 | 1–0 | 1–2 | 1–1 | 1–0 | 2–0 | 1–0 | 3–0 | 1–0 | 1–0 | 0–2 |
| Chachoengsao | 1–1 | 1–2 | 2–3 | | 3–1 | 5–0 | 2–2 | 2–3 | 4–0 | 1–0 | 2–0 | 4–1 | 2–0 | 2–1 |
| Kalasin | 3–1 | 0–5 | 0–2 | 2–1 | | 1–2 | 0–2 | 1–0 | 1–0 | 2–1 | 4–0 | 4–1 | 2–1 | 0–0 |
| Kamphaengphet | 1–1 | 0–1 | 0–0 | 2–1 | 2–2 | | 0–2 | 1–0 | 0–2 | 1–1 | 1–3 | 3–1 | 1–1 | 0–0 |
| Khonkaen | 4–0 | 3–0 | 2–1 | 3–1 | 4–1 | 2–0 | | 0–0 | 1–1 | 3–2 | 3–1 | 5–0 | 3–1 | 2–0 |
| Lamphun Warrior | 1–0 | 2–1 | 0–1 | 1–0 | 1–1 | 0–0 | 0–2 | | 0–1 | 1–2 | 2–2 | 1–0 | 2–0 | 0–1 |
| Phayao | 0–1 | 0–1 | 2–2 | 2–0 | 2–0 | 1–0 | 2–1 | 3–2 | | 0–1 | 0–0 | 2–0 | 2–2 | 1–3 |
| Phrae United | 1–2 | 1–3 | 2–1 | 1–1 | 2–1 | 0–0 | 1–0 | 1–2 | 1–2 | | 2–1 | 2–1 | 0–2 | 1–1 |
| Sakaeo | 0–1 | 3–1 | 2–3 | 2–0 | 1–0 | 1–2 | 0–0 | 2–2 | 2–2 | 1–0 | | 3–0 | 3–1 | 1–1 |
| Singburi Bangrajun | 1–1 | 0–2 | 1–5 | 0–1 | 2–3 | 1–0 | 0–2 | 1–1 | 0–1 | 2–2 | 0–1 | | 1–1 | 0–2 |
| Ubon Ratchathani | 1–3 | 0–2 | 1–0 | 3–4 | 2–2 | 4–3 | 1–2 | 2–0 | 1–1 | 1–3 | 1–1 | 1–1 | | 0–0 |
| Udon Thani | 1–0 | 1–0 | 2–2 | 4–0 | 2–1 | 1–0 | 0–2 | 3–0 | 4–2 | 0–2 | 2–1 | 6–0 | 5–1 | |

Updated to match(es) played on 16 September 2017. Source: Thai League 3
Legend: Blue = home team win; Yellow = draw; Red = away team win.

== Season statistics ==
=== Top scorers ===
As of 16 September 2017.

| Rank | Player | Club | Goals |
|---|---|---|---|
| 1 | (South Korea) Kim Ji-hun | Ayutthaya | 19 |
| 2 | (Thailand) Sarawut Choenchai | Chachoengsao | 14 |
| 3 | (Brazil) Valci Júnior | Udon Thani | 13 |
| 4 | (Trinidad and Tobago) Kendall Jagdeosingh | Ayutthaya United | 11 |
| 4 | (Thailand) Dhossapol Yotchan | Khonkaen | 11 |
| 6 | (Cameroon) Bouba Abbo | Ubon Ratchathani | 10 |
| 6 | (Australia) Richard Cardozo | Khonkaen | 10 |
| 8 | (North Macedonia) Darko Tasevski | Khonkaen | 9 |
| 8 | (Ghana) Victor Mensah | Amnat United | 9 |
| 10 | (Cameroon) Dominique Nyamsi Jacques | Chachoengsao | 8 |
| 10 | (Brazil) Fabricio Peris Carneiro | Ayutthaya United | 8 |
| 10 | (Thailand) Jaruwat Narmmool | Phrae United | 8 |
| 10 | (Thailand) Teerawut Wongton | Phayao | 8 |

=== Hat-tricks ===
| Player | For | Against | Result | Date |
|---|---|---|---|---|
| (Thailand) Padungsak Phothinak | Chachoengsao | Kamphaengphet | 5–0 | 2 July 2017 |
| (South Korea) Kim Ji-hun | Ayutthaya | Phrae United | 3–1 | 9 September 2017 |

== Attendances ==
=== Overall statistical table ===
| Pos | Team | Total | High | Low | Average | Change |
|---|---|---|---|---|---|---|
| 1 | Udon Thani | 39,580 | 3,944 | 2,152 | 3,044 | n/a |
| 2 | Khonkaen | 35,698 | 5,180 | 1,778 | 2,746 | n/a |
| 3 | Chachoengsao | 18,862 | 4,120 | 907 | 1,571 | n/a |
| 4 | Ayutthaya United | 14,267 | 2,752 | 652 | 1,097 | n/a |
| 5 | Lamphun Warrior | 12,243 | 1,639 | 495 | 1,020 | n/a |
| 6 | Phayao | 12,658 | 1,845 | 349 | 973 | n/a |
| 7 | Sakaeo | 9,652 | 1,200 | 380 | 742 | n/a |
| 8 | Phrae United | 7,070 | 820 | 143 | 543 | n/a |
| 9 | Ayutthaya | 5,684 | 984 | 207 | 473 | n/a |
| 10 | Ubon Ratchathani | 5,908 | 750 | 200 | 454 | n/a |
| 11 | Kalasin | 4,813 | 1,024 | 151 | 370 | n/a |
| 12 | Amnat United | 4,257 | 600 | 35 | 327 | n/a |
| 13 | Kamphaengphet | 3,656 | 800 | 100 | 304 | n/a |
| 14 | Singburi Bangrajun | 3,567 | 700 | 150 | 274 | n/a |
| | League total | 177,915 | 5,180 | 35 | 999 | n/a |

Updated to games played on 16 September 2017
Source: Thai League 3

=== Attendances by home match played ===
| Team \ Match played | 1 | 2 | 3 | 4 | 5 | 6 | 7 | 8 | 9 | 10 | 11 | 12 | 13 | Total |
|---|---|---|---|---|---|---|---|---|---|---|---|---|---|---|
| Amnat United | 487 | 450 | 233 | 156 | 220 | 600 | 415 | 244 | 446 | 302 | 151 | 35 | 518 | 4,257 |
| Ayutthaya | 508 | 466 | 620 | 330 | 452 | 456 | 764 | 316 | 252 | 329 | Unk.4 | 984 | 207 | 5,684 |
| Ayutthaya United | 934 | 1,160 | 1,155 | 970 | 1,204 | 733 | 1,162 | 671 | 982 | 2,752 | 1,211 | 681 | 652 | 14,267 |
| Chachoengsao | 1,815 | 1,240 | 1,250 | 1,100 | 2,140 | 1,100 | Unk.3 | 1,407 | 1,210 | 1,234 | 907 | 1,339 | 4,120 | 18,862 |
| Kalasin | 500 | 422 | 600 | 248 | 584 | 240 | 196 | 210 | 239 | 202 | 151 | 1,024 | 197 | 4,813 |
| Kamphaengphet | 800 | 300 | 420 | 370 | 208 | Unk.2 | 250 | 250 | 320 | 100 | 220 | 300 | 118 | 3,656 |
| Khonkaen | 1,778 | 2,681 | 2,323 | 2,596 | 2,568 | 2,218 | 2,316 | 2,237 | 2,575 | 2,904 | 5,180 | 2,608 | 3,714 | 35,698 |
| Lamphun Warrior | Unk.1 | 1,639 | 1,215 | 1,250 | 1,345 | 1,359 | 1,350 | 790 | 750 | 720 | 550 | 780 | 495 | 12,243 |
| Phayao | 1,845 | 1,549 | 1,258 | 1,791 | 1,284 | 849 | 835 | 893 | 583 | 436 | 528 | 349 | 458 | 12,658 |
| Phrae United | 745 | 736 | 820 | 780 | 559 | 789 | 405 | 410 | 625 | 452 | 143 | 456 | 150 | 7,070 |
| Sakaeo | 900 | 1,152 | 1,200 | 920 | 780 | 520 | 600 | 380 | 500 | 740 | 600 | 560 | 800 | 9,652 |
| Singburi Bangrajun | 300 | 700 | 300 | 250 | 200 | 217 | 250 | 300 | 150 | 150 | 150 | 200 | 400 | 3,567 |
| Ubon Ratchathani | 600 | 500 | 550 | 450 | 550 | 350 | 214 | 600 | 750 | 450 | 444 | 250 | 200 | 5,908 |
| Udon Thani | 3,944 | 3,634 | 3,825 | 3,286 | 3,716 | 2,533 | 3,100 | 2,516 | 2,647 | 3,072 | 2,403 | 2,152 | 2,752 | 39,580 |

Source: Thai League 3
Note:
Unk.1 Some error of T3 official match report 19 February 2017 (Lamphun Warrior 2–0 Ubon Ratchathani).
Unk.2 Some error of T3 official match report 30 April 2017 (Kamphaengphet 3–1 Singburi Bangrajun).
Unk.3 Some error of T3 official match report 2 July 2017 (Chachoengsao 5–0 Kamphaengphet).
Unk.4 Some error of T3 official match report 12 August 2017 (Ayutthaya 1–0 Lamphun Warrior).

== See also ==
- 2017 Thai League
- 2017 Thai League 2
- 2017 Thai League 3
- 2017 Thai League 4
- 2017 Thai FA Cup
- 2017 Thai League Cup
- 2017 Thai League 3 Lower Region
