= 2016 Regional League Division 2 North Eastern Region =

Regional League North Eastern Region
- Season: 2016
- Champions: Udon Thani
- Relegated: Nakhon Phanom
- Matches: 182
- Goals: 464 (2.55 per match)
- Top goalscorer: Bouba Abbo (12 Goals)
- Biggest home win: Surin City 5–0 Nakhon Phanom (29 May 2016)
- Biggest away win: Mukdahan Lamkhong 0–7 Nong Khai (11 June 2016)
- Highest scoring: Mahasarakham 5–4 Nong Khai (24 July 2016)
- Longest winning run: Ubon Ratchathani 6 matches (11 June 2016-23 July 2016)
- Longest unbeaten run: Ubon Ratchathani 13 matches (7 May 2016-23 July 2016)
- Longest winless run: Nakhon Phanom 19 matches (8 May 2016-24 August 2016)
- Longest losing run: Mukdahan Lamkhong 5 matches (1 June 2016-2 July 2016); Nakhon Phanom 5 matches (5 June 2016-9 July 2016); Nong Khai 5 matches (10 July 2016-3 August 2016); Nakhon Phanom 5 matches (3 August 2016-24 August 2016)

2016 Regional League Division 2 North Eastern Region is the 8th season of the League competition since its establishment in 2009. It is in the third tier of the Thai football league system. The league winners and runners up will qualify for the 2016 Regional League Division 2 champions league round.

== Changes from last season ==
=== Team changes ===
==== Promoted clubs ====
Khonkaen United and Ubon UMT United were promoted to the 2016 Thai Division 1 League.

==== Returning clubs ====
Yasothon is returning to the league after a 2-year break.

==== Moved clubs ====
- Loei City and Nong Bua Pitchaya were moved to the Northern Region.
- Chaiyaphum were moved to the Central Region.

== Stadium and locations ==
Locations of the 2016 Regional League North Eastern Teams

Team	Location	Stadium	Capacity	Ref.
Amnat Poly United	Amnat Charoen	Amnat Charoen Province Stadium	2,500	
Kalasin	Kalasin	Kalasin Town municipality Stadium	2,580	
Khonkaen	Khon Kaen	50 years Khon Kaen University Stadium	8,000	
Mahasarakham	Maha Sarakham	Mahasarakham Province Stadium	3,171	
Mukdahan Lamkhong	Mukdahan	Mukdahan Province Stadium	5,000	
Nakhon Phanom	Nakhon Phanom	Nakhon Phanom Province Stadium	4,477	
Nong Khai FT	Nong Khai,	Nong Khai Province Stadium	4,500	
Roi Et United	Roi Et	Roi Et Province Stadium	3,066	
Sakon Nakhon Muangthai	Sakon Nakhon	Sakon Nakhon Rajabhat University Stadium	?	
Sisaket United	Sisaket	Sri Nakhon Lamduan Stadium	9,000	
Surin City	Surin	Sri Narong Stadium	5,673	
Ubon Ratchathani	Ubon Rachathani	Ubon Rachathani Sports School Stadium	2,945	
Udon Thani	Udon Thani	Udon Thani Rajabhat University Stadium	3,500	
Yasothon	Yasothon	Yasothon Province Stadium	2,500	

== League table ==
Pos	Team	Pld	W	D	L	GF	GA	GD	Pts	Promotion or relegation
1	Udon Thani (C, Q)	26	18	4	4	55	17	+38	58	Qualification to Champions League Round and Promotion to Thai League Championship
2	Ubon Ratchathani (Q)	26	15	8	3	47	28	+19	53	Qualification to Champions League Round and Promotion to Thai League Championship
3	Kalasin (P)	26	15	2	9	39	30	+9	47	Promotion to Thai League Championship
4	Khon Kaen (P)	26	12	8	6	40	26	+14	44	Promotion to Thai League Championship
5	Amnat Poly United (P)	26	12	6	8	31	21	+10	42	Promotion to Thai League Championship
6	Mahasarakham	26	11	7	8	40	36	+4	40	
7	Sakon Nakhon	26	10	5	11	35	41	−6	35 (Note: SKN 0–0 ROI ; ROI 1–3 SKN)	
8	Roi Et United	26	9	8	9	25	33	−8	35	
9	Nong Khai FT	26	8	10	8	38	37	+1	34	
10	Sisaket United	26	8	9	9	35	36	−1	33	
11	Yasothon	26	6	8	12	19	31	−12	26	
12	Surin City	26	5	7	14	19	33	−14	22	
13	Mukdahan Lamkhong	26	4	4	18	16	47	−31	16	
14	Nakhon Phanom (R)	26	2	8	16	25	48	−23	14	Relegation to Thai Football Division 3

Source: Division 2 North-East
Rules for classification: 1) points; 2) head-to-head points; 3) head-to-head goal difference; 4) head-to-head goals scored; 5) goal difference; 6) number of goals scored.
(C) Champions; (P) Promoted; (Q) Qualified for the phase indicated; (R) Relegated

== Results ==
Home \ Away	APU	KAL	KHK	MAH	MUK	NPN	NKH	ROI	SKN	SKU	SUR	UBR	UDT	YAS
Amnat Poly United		3–0	1–2	0–2	2–1	1–0	1–0	0–1	1–0	2–0	3–0	0–1	2–1	2–1
Kalasin	2–1		2–1	0–1	3–1	2–1	0–1	0–0	3–0	4–2	1–0	2–1	2–1	2–1
Khon Kaen	1–1	1–1		3–0	2–1	2–1	1–1	1–2	3–1	1–1	1–0	3–1	0–0	0–0
Mahasarakham	1–2	5–2	1–0		0–0	4–0	5–4	0–0	3–1	1–1	1–0	1–1	1–5	0–2
Mukdahan Lamkhong	2–1	0–1	2–2	0–2		1–3	0–7	0–2	1–2	0–1	0–0	0–1	0–4	0–1
Nakhon Phanom	1–1	1–2	0–1	2–3	1–1		3–3	1–1	0–1	1–1	0–1	1–3	0–2	0–0
Nong Khai FT	1–4	1–4	0–1	2–1	0–1	3–2		2–1	1–0	1–1	1–1	0–0	3–3	1–1
Roi Et United	0–1	1–0	0–2	0–0	2–1	2–1	1–1		1–3	3–2	1–0	1–5	2–2	1–1
Sakon Nakhon	1–0	1–0	1–0	2–2	0–1	2–3	2–0	0–0		4–2	2–1	2–2	1–0	2–2
Sisaket United	0–0	2–1	3–3	2–1	3–1	1–1	0–1	3–0	5–3		1–0	0–1	0–2	1–0
Surin City	0–0	1–4	0–3	0–0	2–0	5–0	1–1	1–0	1–1	0–0		1–4	1–3	1–0
Ubon Ratchathani	0–0	2–0	4–2	1–0	1–0	2–1	1–1	4–2	3–2	3–3	3–2		1–1	1–0
Udon Thani	3–2	1–0	2–1	4–0	4–0	2–0	1–0	2–0	4–0	1–0	2–0	2–0		3–0
Yasothon	0–0	0–1	0–3	2–5	0–2	1–1	1–2	0–1	2–1	1–0	1–0	1–1	1–0	

Updated to match(es) played on 4 September 2016. Source: Division 2 North-East
Legend: Blue = home team win; Yellow = draw; Red = away team win.

== Season statistics ==
=== Top scorers ===
As of 28 August 2016.

Rank	Player	Club	Goals
1	(Cameroon) Bouba Abbo	Ubon Ratchathani	12
2	(Thailand) Thanapol Srithong	Khonkaen	10
3	(Thailand) Natthaphat Somsri	Udon Thani	9
3	(Thailand) Decha Sirifong	Sakon Nakhon	9
3	(Thailand) Manuschai Phupaisit	Mahasarakham	9
6	(Ivory Coast) Arboubacar Sanogo	Yasothon	7
6	(Japan) Takaya Sugasawa	Nakhon Phanom	7
6	(Thailand) Kittipong Wongma	Udon Thani	7
6	(Thailand) Rachanon Srinork	Udon Thani	7
10	(Ivory Coast) Bernard Henri	Udon Thani	6
10	(Ivory Coast) Traore Ibrahima	Mahasarakham	6
10	(Japan) Seiya Kojima	Khonkaen	6
10	(Thailand) David Srangnanaok	Kalasin	6

== See also ==
- 2016 Thai Premier League
- 2016 Thai Division 1 League
- 2016 Regional League Division 2
- 2016 Thai FA Cup
- 2016 Thai League Cup
- 2016 Kor Royal Cup
