= Behshad Yavarzadeh =

Iranian American retired football player (born 1983)

Personal information
- Full name: Behshad Yavarzadeh Ahrandjani
- Date of birth: January 7, 1983 (age 43)
- Place of birth: [ Tehran ], Iran
- Height: 1.83 m (6 ft 0 in)
- Position: Central midfielder

Youth career
- 2002–2005: Esteghlal

Senior career*
Years	Team	Apps	(Gls)
2004–2007	Esteghlal	21	(0)
2005–2006	→ Tarbiat Badani Yazd (loan)	24	(4)
2007–2009	Steel Azin	48	(13)
2009–2010	DAC Dunajská Streda	15	(2)
2010–2011	Dubai Club	22	(4)
2011–2012	Paykan	23	(7)
2012–2013	Rah Ahan	16	(0)
2013–2014	Paykan	12	(1)
2015	Udon Thani	26	(17)
2016	Shan United	10	(0)
2016	Udon Thani	10	(2)

International career
2005–2006	Iran U23	6	(1)
- * Club domestic league appearances and goals as of 18 April 2012

Behshad Yavarzadeh (Persian: بهشاد یاورزاده; born January 7, 1983, in Iran) is an Iranian American retired football player, who last played for Udon Thani in the Thai Regional League Division. He usually plays as a midfielder. Despite playing on one of the bottom-ranking teams in Slovakia, he has proven to be a moderate success and has scored and assisted in his recent appearances as a starter.

== Return to Udon Thani ==
On 16 June 2016, Yavarzadeh returned to Udon Thani by signing a one-and-a-half-year contract. On 28 June 2016, he made his first appearance for the Udon Thani in Thai Regional League Division. On 3 July 2016, he first provided an assist in Thai Regional League Division. He also assisted one goal in Udon Thani On August 4, 2014. Behshad scored his first goal on 14 August 2016 in Thai Regional League Division.

=== Club career statistics ===
: As of 19 November 2016[4]

- Assist Goals

Season	Team	Assists
2010–11 Arabian Gulf League	Dubai Club	4
2011–12 Azadegan League	Paykan	1
2015 Thai Regional League Division	Udon Thani	5
2016 Thai Regional League Division	Udon Thani	5

== Honours ==
=== Club ===
Steel Azin

- Azadegan League: 2008–09

DAC Dunajská Streda

- Slovak Cup: 2009–10 (Semifinals)

Paykan

- Azadegan League: 2011–12 2013–14

Udon Thani

- Thai Regional League Division: 2016 Thai Regional League Division

== Personal life ==
Yavarzadeh permanent residence in the Santa Monica, Los Angeles, California, United States of America by Green Card Lottery and behshad in this way has been achieved Permanent residence United States of America.
