= 2010 Regional League Division 2 North Eastern Region =

League competition

Regional League North-East Division
- Season: 2010
- Champions: Loei City
- Matches: 240
- Goals: 725 (3.02 per match)
- Biggest home win: Surin 6–0 Nong Bua Lamphu (28 February 2010)
- Biggest away win: Nakhon Phanom 0–5 Chaiyaphum United (7 August 2010)
- Highest scoring: Nakhon Ratchasima 7–2 Kalasin (1 May 2010) (9 goals)

2010 Regional League Division 2 North-East Region is the 2nd season of the League competition since its establishment in 2009. It is in the third tier of the Thai football league system.

The league was expanded from 12 clubs in 2009 to 16 clubs this season. The league winners and runners up qualified for the 2010 Regional League Division 2 championship stage.

== Changes from last season ==
=== Team changes ===
==== Renamed clubs ====
Mukdahan-Savannakhet renamed Mukdahan

==== Expansion clubs ====
Ubon Tiger, Nong Khai, Yasothon United, Nong Bua Lamphu and Kalasin joined the newly expanded league setup.

==== Serving bans ====
Ubon United are in the first year of their two-year ban.

== Stadium and locations ==
Locations of the Regional League North Eastern Teams in 2010

| Team | Location | Stadium | Capacity | Ref. |
|---|---|---|---|---|
| Chaiyaphum United | Chaiyaphum | Chaiyaphum Province Stadium | ? | |
| Buriram | Buriram | I-Mobile Stadium | 14,000 | |
| Roi Et United | Roi Et | Roi Et Province Stadium | 2,500 | |
| Kalasin | Kalasin | Kalasin Province Stadium | 5,000 | |
| Loei City | Loei | Loei Riverside Stadium | ? | |
| Mahasarakham City | Mahasarakham | IPE Mahasarakham Stadium | ? | |
| Mukdahan | Mukdahan | Mukdahan Province Stadium | ? | |
| Nakhon Phanom | Nakhon Phanom | Nakhon Phanom Province Stadium | 2,406 | |
| Nakhon Ratchasima | Nakhon Ratchasima | 80th Birthday Stadium | 24,641 | |
| Nong Bua Lamphu | Nong Bua Lamphu | Nong Bua Lamphu Province Stadium | ? | |
| Nong Khai FT | Nong Khai | Nong Khai Province Stadium | 4,500 | |
| Sakon Nakhon | Sakon Nakhon | Sakon Nakhon City municipality Stadium | ? | |
| Surin | Surin | Sri Narong Stadium | ? | |
| Udon Thani | Udon Thani | Institute of Physical Education Udon Thani Stadium | 4,705 | |
| Ubon Tiger | Ubon Rachathani | Ubon Rachathani Sports School Stadium | 2,945 | |
| Yasothon United | Yasothon | Yasothon Province Stadium | ? | |

== Standings table ==
| Pos | Team | Pld | W | D | L | GF | GA | GD | Pts | Qualification |
|---|---|---|---|---|---|---|---|---|---|---|
| 1 | Loei City (C) | 30 | 21 | 4 | 5 | 67 | 27 | +40 | 67 | Champions League Round |
| 2 | Buriram | 30 | 20 | 5 | 5 | 73 | 28 | +45 | 65 | Champions League Round |
| 3 | Yasothon United | 30 | 17 | 4 | 9 | 64 | 44 | +20 | 55 | |
| 4 | Nakhon Ratchasima | 30 | 14 | 9 | 7 | 51 | 37 | +14 | 51 | |
| 5 | Roi Et United | 30 | 15 | 6 | 9 | 45 | 41 | +4 | 51 | |
| 6 | Chaiyaphum United | 30 | 10 | 13 | 7 | 46 | 33 | +13 | 43 | |
| 7 | Udon Thani | 30 | 12 | 6 | 12 | 39 | 43 | −4 | 42 | |
| 8 | Sakon Nakhon | 30 | 11 | 5 | 14 | 39 | 56 | −17 | 38 | |
| 9 | Mahasarakham City | 30 | 9 | 10 | 11 | 47 | 47 | 0 | 37 | |
| 10 | Nong Bua Lamphu | 30 | 10 | 7 | 13 | 44 | 54 | −10 | 37 | |
| 11 | Kalasin | 30 | 10 | 5 | 15 | 48 | 69 | −21 | 35 | |
| 12 | Nong Khai FT | 30 | 9 | 6 | 15 | 38 | 46 | −8 | 33 | |
| 13 | Surin | 30 | 7 | 11 | 12 | 30 | 42 | −12 | 32 | |
| 14 | Ubon Tiger | 30 | 8 | 5 | 17 | 28 | 47 | −19 | 29 | |
| 15 | Mukdahan | 30 | 6 | 9 | 15 | 32 | 48 | −16 | 27 | |
| 16 | Nakhon Phanom | 30 | 6 | 5 | 19 | 34 | 63 | −29 | 23 | |

Rules for classification: 1) points; 2) head-to-head points; 3) head-to-head goal difference; 4) head-to-head goals scored; 5) goal difference; 6) number of goals scored.
(C) Champions

2010 Thai Division 2 League
North Eastern Region winners
Loei City
2nd title

== Results ==
| Home \ Away | SON | MCH | KAL | LCT | MSK | MUK | NAKP | NAKR | NON | NKH | ROI | SKN | SUR | UBR | UDT | YAS |
|---|---|---|---|---|---|---|---|---|---|---|---|---|---|---|---|---|
| Songkhla United | | 0–0 | 5–0 | 1–0 | 2–2 | 4–1 | 4–1 | 4–0 | 5–1 | 2–2 | 4–1 | 3–0 | 5–0 | 3–0 | 0–1 | 2–0 |
| Chaiyaphum United | 1–3 | | 4–1 | 1–1 | 1–1 | 1–0 | 0–0 | 0–1 | 0–0 | 2–2 | 1–1 | 2–1 | 2–0 | 1–0 | 2–2 | 4–2 |
| Kalasin | 3–1 | 2–1 | | 3–5 | 0–1 | 3–2 | 1–2 | 1–1 | 3–2 | 2–0 | 2–3 | 2–3 | 1–1 | 1–0 | 3–2 | 2–2 |
| Loei City | 3–2 | 3–2 | 5–0 | | 1–0 | 6–1 | 3–2 | 1–1 | 3–1 | 3–0 | 3–0 | 3–0 | 2–0 | 2–0 | 5–2 | 4–1 |
| Mahasarakham City | 2–5 | 1–0 | 2–1 | 2–2 | | 2–2 | 2–2 | 3–0 | 0–0 | 0–1 | 5–0 | 1–2 | 0–0 | 1–2 | 2–1 | 1–1 |
| Mukdahan | 1–1 | 1–1 | 2–1 | 0–1 | 1–3 | | 5–1 | 0–1 | 0–1 | 0–1 | 0–0 | 0–0 | 0–0 | 0–1 | 0–1 | 2–1 |
| Nakhon Phanom | 0–4 | 0–5 | 1–2 | 0–0 | 1–2 | 0–1 | | 0–0 | 1–2 | 4–2 | 4–2 | 2–3 | 0–0 | 3–2 | 1–2 | 0–1 |
| Nakhon Ratchasima | 0–3 | 2–2 | 7–2 | 1–0 | 2–0 | 6–1 | 4–2 | | 3–1 | 1–0 | 0–0 | 2–0 | 1–2 | 1–1 | 2–2 | 1–3 |
| Nong Bua Lamphu | 1–2 | 0–0 | 2–0 | 2–3 | 6–2 | 2–2 | 2–1 | 2–2 | | 1–2 | 1–2 | 1–1 | 0–1 | 3–1 | 3–5 | 2–2 |
| Nong Khai FT | 0–1 | 1–3 | 2–3 | 0–1 | 1–1 | 1–1 | 3–0 | 2–1 | 4–0 | | 0–3 | 1–2 | 0–1 | 3–2 | 0–1 | 4–2 |
| Roi Et United | 1–0 | 2–1 | 0–0 | 0–2 | 2–1 | 3–2 | 3–1 | 0–1 | 0–2 | 2–0 | | 2–1 | 3–0 | 4–2 | 2–1 | 2–3 |
| Sakon Nakhon | 1–2 | 2–4 | 3–2 | 1–0 | 1–1 | 1–3 | 1–0 | 1–5 | 0–2 | 1–4 | 0–3 | | 3–0 | 1–0 | 3–2 | 1–0 |
| Surin | 0–2 | 2–2 | 2–2 | 1–3 | 2–1 | 0–0 | 1–3 | 3–0 | 6–0 | 1–1 | 1–2 | 3–3 | | 0–0 | 0–1 | 0–2 |
| Ubon Tiger | 0–1 | 1–1 | 2–1 | 0–1 | 2–5 | 3–2 | 0–1 | 0–3 | 0–3 | 0–0 | 1–1 | 2–0 | 1–0 | | 1–0 | 2–1 |
| Udon Thani | 1–1 | 0–2 | 0–2 | 1–0 | 2–1 | 1–0 | 2–1 | 0–0 | 0–1 | 2–0 | 1–1 | 1–1 | 1–2 | 2–1 | | 1–2 |
| Yasothon United | 5–1 | 1–0 | 6–2 | 2–1 | 4–2 | 1–2 | 4–0 | 1–2 | 3–0 | 3–1 | 1–0 | 3–2 | 1–1 | 2–1 | 4–1 | |

Updated to match(es) played on unknown. Source: Football Association of Thailand website
Legend: Blue = home team win; Yellow = draw; Red = away team win.
