= 2015 Regional League Division 2 North Eastern Region =

Regional League North-East Region
- Season: 2015
- Champions: Khonkaen United
- Matches: 306
- Goals: 916 (2.99 per match)
- Top goalscorer: (Thailand) Promphong Kransumrong from Udon Thani 25 goals
- Biggest home win: Ubon UMT United 10–0 Nong Khai (20 June 2015)
- Biggest away win: Mukdahan Lamkhong 0–7 Ubon UMT United (9 May 2015)
- Highest scoring: Ubon UMT United 10–0 Nong Khai (20 June 2015); Udon Thani 8–2 Nong Khai (5 September 2015)
- Longest winning run: Ubon UMT United 12 matches (14 June 2015-29 August 2015)
- Longest unbeaten run: Ubon UMT United 18 matches (9 May 2015-29 August 2015)
- Longest losing run: Mukdahan Lamkhong 21 matches (9 May 2015-19 September 2015)

Regional League Division 2 North Eastern Region is the 7th season of the League competition since its establishment in 2009. It is in the third tier of the Thai football league system. The league winners and runners up qualified for the 2015 Regional League Division 2 champions league round.

== Changes from last season ==
=== Team changes ===
==== Promoted clubs ====
No club was promoted to the Thai Division 1 League. Last years league champions Ubon Ratchathani, runners up Udon Thani failed to qualify from the 2014 Regional League Division 2 champions league round.

==== Relegated clubs ====
Khonkaen and Roi Et United were relegated from the 2014 Thai Division 1 League.

==== Renamed clubs ====
- Nong Bua Lamphu renamed Nong Bua Pitchaya.
- Ubon UMT F.C. renamed Ubon Ratchathani F.C.
- Mukdahan City renamed Mukdahan Lamkhong.
- Mahasarakham United renamed Mahasarakham.
- Loei City renamed Loei City R-Airlines.

=== Expansion clubs ===
Khon Kaen United and Ubon UMT United joined the newly expanded league setup.

== Stadium and locations ==
Locations of the 2015 Regional League North Eastern Teams

Team	Location	Stadium	Capacity	Ref.
Amnat Poly United	Amnat Charoen	Amnat Charoen Province Stadium	2,500	
Mashare Chaiyaphum	Chaiyaphum	IPE Chaiyaphum Stadium	1,957	
Kalasin	Kalasin	Kalasin Province Stadium	2,580	
Khonkaen	Khon Kaen	Khon Kaen Province Stadium	8,500	
Khon Kaen United	Khon Kaen	Khon Kaen Sports School Stadium	2,500	
Loei City R-Airlines	Loei	Loei Riverside Stadium	?	
Mahasarakham	Mahasarakham	Mahasarakham Province Stadium	3,171	
Mukdahan Lumkhong	Mukdahan	Mukdahan Province Stadium	5,000	
Nakhon Phanom	Nakhon Phanom	Nakhon Phanom PAO. Stadium	4,477	
Nong Bua Pitchaya	Nong Bua Lamphu	Nong Bua Lamphu Province Stadium	6,053	
Nong Khai FT	Nong Khai	Nong Khai Province Stadium	4,500	
Roi Et United	Roi Et	Roi Et Province Stadium	3,066	
Sakon Nakhon Muangthai	Sakon Nakhon	Sakon Nakhon City municipality Stadium	3,449	
Sisaket United	Sisaket	Sri Nakhon Lamduan Stadium	9,000	
Surin City	Surin	Sri Narong Stadium	?	
Ubon Ratchathani	Ubon Rachathani	Ubon Rachathani Sports School Stadium	2,945	
Ubon UMT United	Ubon Rachathani	Tung Burapha Stadium	8,500	
Udon Thani	Udon Thani	Institute Of Physical Education Udon Thani Stadium	3,500	

== League table ==
Pos	Team	Pld	W	D	L	GF	GA	GD	Pts	Qualification
1	Khonkaen United (C, Q)	34	26	4	4	69	28	+41	82	Champions League Round
2	Ubon UMT United (Q)	34	26	3	5	87	30	+57	81	Champions League Round
3	Udon Thani (Q)	34	21	8	5	78	29	+49	71	Champions League Round Qualifying play-off
4	Loei City R-Airlines	34	21	7	6	72	36	+36	70	
5	Amnat Poly United	34	21	6	7	58	26	+32	69	
6	Khonkaen	34	17	10	7	54	26	+28	61	
7	Ubon Ratchathani	34	15	12	7	54	37	+17	57	
8	Nong Bua Pitchaya	34	14	8	12	47	42	+5	50	
9	Sisaket United	34	13	8	13	45	41	+4	47	
10	Surin City	34	11	8	15	57	52	+5	41	
11	Mashare Chaiyaphum	34	10	10	14	33	39	−6	40	
12	Kalasin	34	10	9	15	45	52	−7	39	
13	Nakhon Phanom	34	9	5	20	45	68	−23	32	
14	Roi Et United	34	7	8	19	46	78	−32	29 (Note: ROI 1–0 MAH; MAH 2–3 ROI)	
15	Mahasarakham	34	8	5	21	35	73	−38	29	
16	Sakon Nakhon Muangthai	34	6	4	24	34	88	−54	22	
17	Nong Khai FT	34	4	8	22	34	81	−47	20	
18	Mukdahan Lamkhong	34	4	3	27	23	90	−67	15	

Rules for classification: 1) points; 2) head-to-head points; 3) head-to-head goal difference; 4) head-to-head goals scored; 5) goal difference; 6) number of goals scored.
(C) Champions; (Q) Qualified for the phase indicated
