= Thanathip Paengwong =

Thai footballer (born 1991)

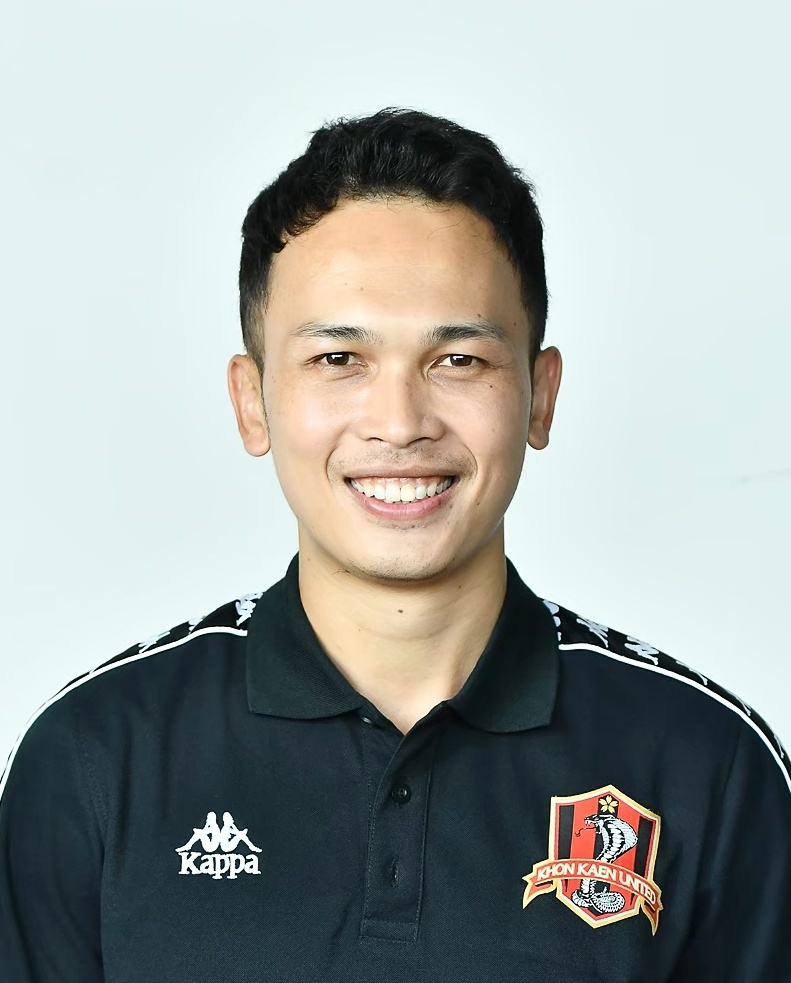
Thanathip Paengwong Thanathip Paengwong
Personal information
- Full name: Thanathip Paengwong
- Date of birth: 5 April 1991 (age 35)
- Place of birth: Roi Et, Thailand
- Height: 1.77 m (5 ft 9 1/2 in)
- Positions: Left back; midfielder

Team information
- Current team: Nongbua Pitchaya
- Number: 35

Senior career*
Years	Team	Apps	(Gls)
2008–2010	Osotspa	0	(0)
2010–2016	Udon Thani	106	(4)
2016–2018	Khon Kaen	52	(0)
2019–2021	Udon Thani	82	(0)
2022	Khon Kaen United	7	(0)
2023–2024	Udon United	16	(0)
2024	Nongbua Pitchaya	8	(0)
- * Club domestic league appearances and goals

Thanathip Paengwong (Thai: ธนาธิป แพงวงศ์) is a Thai professional footballer who plays for Nongbua Pitchaya in the Thai League 2 as both left back and midfielder.

He previously played for Osotspa in Thai Premier League.
