= Sugishita =

Sugishita (written: 杉下) is a Japanese surname. Notable people with the surname include:

- Seiya Sugishita (杉下 聖哉, born 1988), Japanese footballer
- Shigeru Sugishita (杉下 茂, born 1925), Japanese baseball player and coach
