= Amnat United F.C. =

Thai football club

Amnat United อำนาจ ยูไนเต็ด
- Full name: Amnat United Football Club สโมสรฟุตบอลอำนาจ ยูไนเต็ด
- Nicknames: The God of Death Ants (มดมัจจุราช)
- Short name: ANUTD
- Founded: 2011; 15 years ago
- Ground: Amnat Charoen Province Stadium; Amnat Charoen, Thailand
- Capacity: 2,000
- Chairman: Chanpen Prasertsri
- Manager: Chawapon Kamonsin
- League: Thai League 3
Home colours	Away colours

Amnat United Football Club (Thai สโมสรฟุตบอลอำนาจ ยูไนเต็ด), is a Thai semi professional football club based in Amnat Charoen province. The club was formed in 2011 and entered the Thai League 3 Northern Region.

The club changed their name from Amnat Charoen Town to Amnat Poly United in 2014, and to Amnat United in December 2016.

These team were taking a 2-years break. This team is automatically banned 2 years, don't get subsidy and relegated to 2020 Thai League 4 North Eastern Region.

== Stadium and locations ==
Coordinates	Location	Stadium	Capacity	Year
15°51′07″N 104°38′10″E	Amnat Charoen	Amnat Charoen Municipal Stadium	2,500	2011–2013
15°53′44″N 104°36′43″E	Amnat Charoen	Amnat Charoen Province Stadium	2,500	2014–2017

== Season by season record ==
Season	League									FA Cup	League Cup	Top goalscorer	
Season	Division	P	W	D	L	F	A	Pts	Pos	FA Cup	League Cup	Name	Goals
2011	North-East	30	4	7	19	22	59	19	14th	Not Enter	Not Enter		
2012	North-East	30	12	6	12	38	44	42	9th	Not Enter	QR1		
2013	North-East	30	6	10	14	28	44	28	13th	Not Enter	QR1		
2014	North-East	26	8	10	8	27	34	34	8th	Not Enter	QR2		
2015	North-East	34	21	6	7	58	26	69	5th	Not Enter	Not Enter		
2016	North-East	26	12	6	8	31	21	42	5th	Not Enter	Not Enter		
2017	T3 Upper	26	9	6	11	31	39	33	10th	Not Enter	Not Enter	Victor Mensah	9
2018–2019	Banned 2 years from Club-licensing don't pass												
2020	T4 North-East												

Champions	Runners-up	Promoted	Relegated

- P = Played
- W = Games won
- D = Games drawn
- L = Games lost
- F = Goals for
- A = Goals against
- Pts = Points
- Pos = Final position
- QR1 = First Qualifying Round
- QR2 = Second Qualifying Round
- R1 = Round 1
- R2 = Round 2
- R3 = Round 3
- R4 = Round 4
- R5 = Round 5
- R6 = Round 6
- QF = Quarter-finals
- SF = Semi-finals
- RU = Runners-up
- W = Winners
