= Ratchanon Phangkaew =

Thai footballer (born 1989)

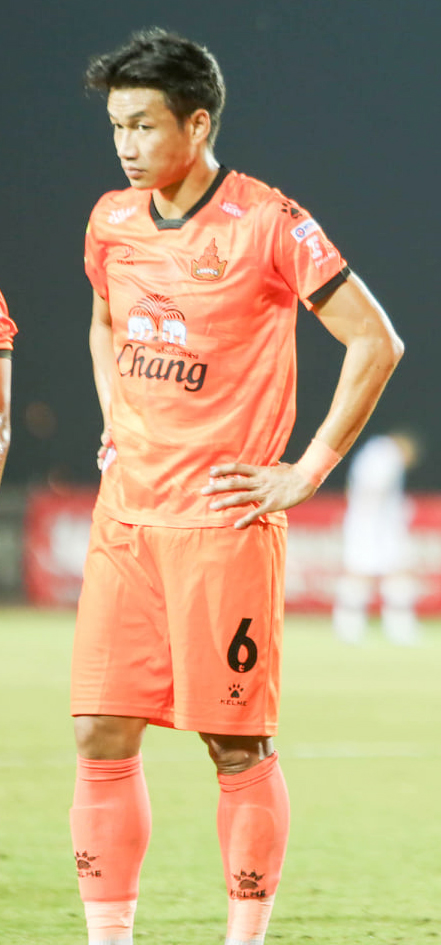
- Ratchanon Phangkaew playing for Udon Thani.

Personal information
- Full name: Ratchanon Phangkaew
- Date of birth: 6 January 1989 (age 37)
- Place of birth: Loei, Thailand
- Height: 1.80 m (5 ft 11 in)
- Position: Defender

Team information
- Current team: Hua Hin City
- Number: 3

Senior career*
Years	Team	Apps	(Gls)
2010–2013	Udon Thani	76	(5)
2014	BCC Tero	19	(3)
2015	BEC Tero Sasana	2	(1)
2016–2017	Udon Thani	30	(1)
2017–2018	Police Tero		
2018	→ Kasetsart (loan)		
2019	→ Udon Thani (loan)	37	(0)
2020	Nongbua Pitchaya	0	(0)
2021–2023	Udon Thani	48	(1)
2023	Mahasarakham	4	(0)
2024	Navy	2	(0)
2024	Kanchanaburi City	19	(0)
2025–	Hua Hin City	5	(0)
- * Club domestic league appearances and goals as of 30 April 2023

Ratchanon Phangkaew (Thai: รัชชานนท์ ผางแก้ว) is a Thai professional footballer who plays for Thai League 3 side Hua Hin City.
