= Watcharapong Klahan =

Thai footballer and coach

Personal information
- Full name: Watcharapong Klahan
- Date of birth: 31 August 1978 (age 48)
- Place of birth: Suphan Buri, Thailand
- Height: 1.73 m (5 ft 8 in)
- Position: Goalkeeper

Youth career
- Suphanburi

Senior career*
Years	Team	Apps	(Gls)
2000–2001	Suphanburi	7	(0)
2002–2005	TOT	61	(0)
2007	Bangkok Bank	20	(0)
2008–2010	Chula United	39	(0)
2010–2012	Sisaket	42	(0)
2012–2014	Army United	14	(0)
2015	Ubon UMT United	4	(0)

International career
1996–1997	Thailand U17		

Managerial career
- 2018: Udon Thani
- * Club domestic league appearances and goals as of 22 June 2008

Watcharapong Klahan (Thai วัชรพงศ์ กล้าหาญ) is a Thai former professional footballer and football coach.

Klahan played for Thailand at the 1997 FIFA U-17 World Championship in Egypt.
