= Matías Recio =

Argentine footballer

Personal information
- Full name: Matías Eduardo Recio
- Date of birth: 24 January 1980 (age 46)
- Place of birth: Argentina
- Height: 1.81 m (5 ft 11 in)
- Position: Striker

Senior career*
Years	Team	Apps	(Gls)
2002–2003	Atlético Uruguay		
2003-2004	Sportivo Italiano	18	(3)
2004	Club Atlético Brown	2	(0)
2004	Guaraní Antonio Franco	5	(1)
2005	CSD Flandria	12	(1)
2006	La Paz F.C.		
2007–2009	C.S. Cartaginés		
2009–2010	Persita Tangerang		
2010	CLB SHB Đà Nẵng		
2011	Hanoi FC	10	(3)
2011–2012	Sarmiento de Resistencia	6	(0)
2012	Army United F.C.		
2012	Khon Kaen F.C.		
2014	Chiangmai F.C.		
2015	TTM Thailand Tobacco Monopoly F.C.		
- * Club domestic league appearances and goals

Matías Recio (born 24 January 1980 in Argentina) is an Argentinean footballer.
