= Kang Hyeon =

South Korean footballer (born 1998)

Personal information
- Date of birth: 30 January 1998 (age 28)
- Height: 1.77 m (5 ft 10 in)
- Position: Midfielder

Team information
- Current team: Mahasarakham CC
- Number: 6

Youth career
- 2008–2009: Pyeongtaek Seongdong; Elementary School
- 2010–2011: Samil Middle School
- 2013–2016: Kapfenberger SV

Senior career*
Years	Team	Apps	(Gls)
2014–2016	Kapfenberger SV	1	(0)
2018–2019	Kustošija		
2019	Ayutthaya		
2021–2022	Yeoju	15	(0)
2023	Sejong Vanesse		
2024	Pyeongtaek Citizen	0	
- * Club domestic league appearances and goals as of 14:18, 10 November 2024 (UTC)

- Kang Hyeon
- Hangul: 강현
- RR: Gang Hyeon
- MR: Kang Hyŏn

Kang Hyeon (Korean: 강현; born 30 January 1998) is a South Korean footballer who currently plays as a midfielder for Thai League 2 club Mahasarakham CC.

== Career statistics ==
=== Club ===
As of 10 November 2021.

Club	Season	League			Cup		Other		Total	
Club	Season	Division	Apps	Goals	Apps	Goals	Apps	Goals	Apps	Goals
Kapfenberger SV	2013–14	2. Liga	1	0	0	0	0	0	1	0
Kapfenberger SV	2014–15	2. Liga	0	0	0	0	0	0	0	0
Kapfenberger SV	2015–16	2. Liga	0	0	0	0	0	0	0	0
Kapfenberger SV	Total		1	0	0	0	0	0	1	0
Yeoju	2021	K4 League	5	0	0	0	0	0	5	0
Career total			6	0	0	0	0	0	6	0
