= Parinya Utapao =

Thai footballer (born 1988)

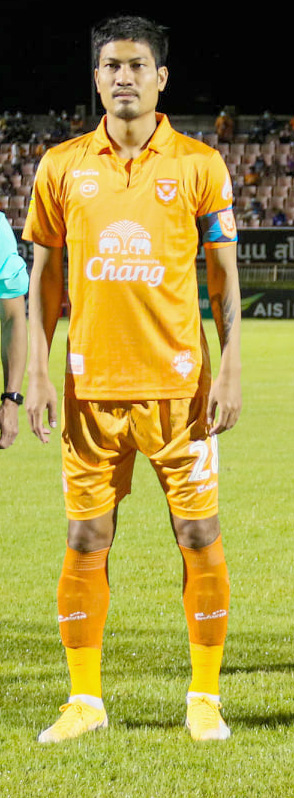
- Parinya playing for Sukhothai

Personal information
- Full name: Parinya Utapao
- Date of birth: 30 January 1988 (age 38)
- Place of birth: Ratchaburi, Thailand
- Height: 1.78 m (5 ft 10 in)
- Position: Centre-back

Team information
- Current team: Mahasarakham CC

Senior career*
Years	Team	Apps	(Gls)
2009–2010	Nakhon Pathom	38	(4)
2011–2021	Chainat Hornbill	102	(2)
2014	→ Nakhon Ratchasima (loan)	27	(5)
2021–2022	Sukhothai	29	(3)
2023–2024	Nakhon Pathom United	24	(0)
2024–2025	Kanchanaburi Power	30	(2)
2026	Nakhon Pathom United	12	(0)
2026–	Mahasarakham CC	0	(0)
- * Club domestic league appearances and goals as of 3 August 2026

Parinya Utapao (Thai: ปริญญา อู่ตะเภา, born January 30, 1988), simply known as Pin (Thai: ปิ่น), is a Thai professional footballer who plays as a centre-back for Thai League 2 club Mahasarakham CC.

== Honours ==
=== Club ===
Nakhon Ratchasima

- Thai Division 1 League
  - Champions (1) : 2014

Nakhon Pathom United

- Thai League 2
  - Champions (1) : 2022–23
