= Phithaya Santawong =

Thai footballer (born 1967)

Personal information
- Full name: Phithaya Santawong
- Date of birth: 18 January 1967 (age 59)
- Place of birth: Thailand
- Position: Midfielder

Senior career*
Years	Team	Apps	(Gls)
- Stock Exchange of Thailand
- Royal Thai Air Force

International career
1996	Thailand	5	(3)

Managerial career
- 2009: Udon Thani
- 2010–2011: Udon Thani
- 2012–2014: Udon Thani
- * Club domestic league appearances and goals

Phithaya Santawong (born 18 January 1967) is a Thai former footballer who played as a midfielder for Thailand in the 1996 Asian Cup.
