= Paniphon Kerdyam =

Thai footballer and coach (born 1972)

Personal information
- Full name: Paniphon Kerdyam
- Date of birth: 2 November 1972 (age 53)
- Place of birth: Yasothon, Thailand
- Positions: Attacking midfielder; forward

Senior career*
Years	Team	Apps	(Gls)
1996–1999	Sinthana		
2000–2008	TTM		

Managerial career
- 2011: Kasetsart University
- 2012: Army United
- 2013: F.C. Phuket
- 2013–2014: Sisaket
- 2015: TTM
- 2015: Ayutthaya
- 2017: Udon Thani
- 2018: Samut Sakhon
- 2019: Udon Thani
- 2021–2022: Kasetsart
- 2022–: Udon Thani
- * Club domestic league appearances and goals as of 15 March 2014

Paniphon Kerdyam (Thai พนิพล เกิดแย้ม) is a Thai retired footballer and football coach. He is the current manager of Thai League 2 club Udon Thani.

== Honours ==
=== Players ===
Sinthana

- Thai Premier League: 1998; runner-up: 1997
- Thai FA Cup: 1997
- Kor Royal Cup: 1997, 1998

TTM

- Thai Division 1 League: 2000–01
- Thai Premier League: 2004–05

=== Manager ===
Kasetsart University

- Regional League Bangkok Area Division: 2011

Army United

- Thai FA Cup runner-up: 2012
