= Khon Kaen F.C. =

Thai football club

Khon Kaen ขอนแก่น เอฟซี
- Full name: Khon Kaen Football Club สโมสรฟุตบอลจังหวัดขอนแก่น
- Nicknames: The T-Rexs (ไดโนเสาร์พิฆาต)
- Short name: KKFC
- Founded: 2005; 21 years ago
- Ground: Khon Kaen Provincial Administrative Organization Stadium; Khon Kaen, Thailand
- Capacity: 7,000
- Chairman: Phakin Khamwilaisak
- Head Coach: Apisak Asayut
- League: Thai League 3
- 2025–26: Thai League 3, 3rd of 12 in the Northeastern region
Home colours	Away colours	Third colours

Khon Kaen Football Club (Thai: สโมสรฟุตบอลจังหวัดขอนแก่น) is a Thailand professional football club, based in Khon Kaen province, a city located in the heart of the North Eastern Region of Thailand. The club currently plays in Thai League 3. In 2011, they achieved promotion from Thai Division 1 League to the Thai League 1 for the first time in their history, by finishing runners-up in the Thai Division 1 League.

Khonkaen play their home games at the Khon Kaen Provincial Administrative Organization Stadium. They traditionally play in black and yellow, and their nickname is commonly known as The T-Rexs which came from the famous rich dinosaur fossil excavations of the province.

== History ==
Khon Kaen Football Club was publicly formed on 21 June 2007, before that time the club played in the Provincial League which largely consist of regional football clubs, nonetheless, the league was not recognized by the Football Association of Thailand.

In 2007 the league was merged into Thai Premier League and Thai Division 1 League and the club was registered to be professional football club in this year and was allocated into Thai Division 1 League Group A, the club was close to promotion by finishing at the fourth place that season.

In the 2008 season, Khon Kaen was not performing as well as the previous season as they could only finish the season in 8th place, nevertheless, the club proved themselves, being one of the favourites for promotion in the 2009 season, however, they lost the promotion spot to Sisaket in the last week of the season.

In 2010, the club was finally promoted to the Thai Premier League after finishing runners-up in the league table which was the first time for the club to participate in the top flight of Thai football.

However, their brief TPL tenure ended disappointingly as they finished bottom of the table. Any thoughts of yo-yoing straight back never emerged in 2012 with the T-Rex finishing in the bottom half of the first division.

In 2014, the Club got 17th of 2014 and relegated to 2015 Thai Division 2 League North Eastern Region into North-Eastern zone.

In 2022, Khon Kaen competed in the Thai League 3 for the 2022–23 season. It is their 17th season in the professional league. The club started the season with a 3–0 away win over Nakhon Ratchasima United and they ended the season with a 1–0 home win over Nakhon Ratchasima United. The club has finished 4th place in the league of the Northeastern region. In addition, in the 2022–23 Thai FA Cup Khon Kaen was defeated 2–3 by Phrae United in the third round, causing them to be eliminated and in the 2022–23 Thai League Cup Khon Kaen was defeated 0–1 by Khon Kaen Mordindang in the second qualification round, causing them to be eliminated too.

Later on July 31, 2025, Kasom Chanawong, the club presidents, announced that he would pass on the position of club presidents to the famous singer and actor, Tono Phakin Khamwilaisak, while Kasom moved up to become the club's advisory chairman.

== Stadium and locations ==
Coordinates	Location	Stadium	Capacity	Year
16°24′46″N 102°49′38″E	Khonkaen	Khon Kaen Province Stadium (Khon Kaen PAO. Stadium)	10,000	2007–2015
16°28′36″N 102°49′03″E	Khon Kaen	50th Anniversary Stadium of Khon Kaen University	8,000	2016
16°24′46″N 102°49′38″E	Khonkaen	Khon Kaen Province Stadium (Khon Kaen PAO. Stadium)	10,000	2017

== Season by season record ==
Season	League									FA Cup	League Cup	T3 Cup	Top goalscorer	
Season	Division	P	W	D	L	F	A	Pts	Pos	FA Cup	League Cup	T3 Cup	Name	Goals
2006	Pro League	30	9	8	13			35	11th	Opted out				
2007	DIV1 A	22	7	8	7	25	25	29	4th	Opted out				
2008	DIV1	30	11	8	11	32	34	41	8th	Opted out			(Thailand) Issarapong Lilakorn	11
2009	DIV1	30	16	7	7	49	36	55	4th	R4			(Thailand) Sarawut Vichien	12
2010	DIV1	30	15	9	6	51	35	54	2nd	R3	R2		(Thailand) Surachat Singnhon	10
2011	TPL	34	6	9	19	33	68	27	18th	R3	R3		(Laos) Khampheng Sayavutthi	4
2012	DIV1	34	12	6	16	35	49	42	11th	R3	R2		(Argentina) Matías Recio	7
2013	DIV1	34	8	12	14	40	54	36	16th	R3	R3		(Argentina) Matías Recio	20
2014	DIV1	34	6	10	18	23	45	28	17th	R3	R1		(Japan) Junki Yokono	8
2015	DIV 2 Northeast	34	17	10	7	54	26	61	6th	R2	QR1			
2016	DIV 2 Northeast	26	12	8	6	40	26	44	4th	R1	R2		(Thailand) Thanapol Srithong	10
2017	T3 Upper	26	18	5	3	53	18	59	1st	R2	QR1		(Thailand) Thotsaphon Yotchan, (North Macedonia) Darko Tasevski	11
2018	T2	28	14	7	7	52	30	49	4th	QF	R1		(Ivory Coast) Marc Landry Babo	16
2019	T2	34	13	10	11	40	48	49	8th	R1	R2		(Japan) Seiya Sugishita	12
2020–21	T2	34	11	8	15	34	38	41	10th	R1	Opted out		(Japan) Seiya Sugishita	12
2021–22	T2	34	5	9	20	32	60	24	17th	R1	QRP		(Thailand) Chakrit Rawanprakone	7
2022–23	T3 Northeast	24	11	8	5	36	21	41	4th	R3	QR2		(Brazil) Judivan	12
2023–24	T3 Northeast	24	12	7	5	29	19	43	5th	QR	QR1	QR2	(Brazil) Alberto Moreira Gouvea	8
2024–25	T3 Northeast	20	12	4	4	32	14	40	2nd	R3	QR2	QF	(Brazil) João Guimarães	13
2025–26	T3 Northeast	22	11	8	3	32	13	41	3rd	R1	QR2	QF	(Thailand) Worawaran Pholuea	8

Champions	Runners-up	Third place	Promoted	Relegated

- P = Played
- W = Games won
- D = Games drawn
- L = Games lost
- F = Goals for
- A = Goals against
- Pts = Points
- Pos = Final position
- TPL = Thai Premier League
- QR1 = First Qualifying Round
- QR2 = Second Qualifying Round
- QR3 = Third Qualifying Round
- QR4 = Fourth Qualifying Round
- RInt = Intermediate Round
- R1 = Round 1
- R2 = Round 2
- R3 = Round 3
- R4 = Round 4
- R5 = Round 5
- R6 = Round 6
- GR = Group stage
- QF = Quarter-finals
- SF = Semi-finals
- RU = Runners-up
- S = Shared
- W = Winners

== Players ==
=== First Team squad ===
As of 20 September 2024.

Note: Flags indicate national team as defined under FIFA eligibility rules; some limited exceptions apply. Players may hold more than one non-FIFA nationality.

No.	Pos.	Nation	Player
1	GK	THA	Teerasak Songklang
2	DF	THA	Thanaphong Borikun
3	DF	BRA	Jonathan Monteiro
5	DF	THA	Chakkaphat Phumnuan
6	DF	THA	Sarawin Saengra
7	FW	THA	Thanaphat Phutnok
8	MF	THA	Tadsawat Sriwilot
9	FW	THA	Charin Boodhad
10	MF	BRA	João Guimarães
11	FW	BRA	Jhonata Santos
14	MF	THA	Phommin Kaeosanga
15	MF	THA	Taweesak Chanlee
17	MF	THA	Kittichai Yomkhot
18	GK	THA	Thanandorn Pasri
19	DF	THA	Ratthaphon Phoopharot
20	FW	THA	Punyachotc Namjatturat

No.	Pos.	Nation	Player
21	DF	THA	Natthjawut Srimongkol
22	FW	THA	Piyapong Srikaew
24	FW	THA	Cholakran Chueaprasat
25	DF	THA	Nutdanai Ketpaen
26	FW	THA	Worawaran Pholuea
27	MF	THA	Kitchaphum Monthianart
30	GK	THA	Bunditvicha Nongngok
31	DF	THA	Chawit Daengsopa
32	GK	THA	Nattapumin Nongbua
33	MF	THA	Kitsada Hemvipat
40	DF	THA	Ratchanon Khotchana
70	MF	THA	Amnawat Pasotiyang
80	FW	THA	Suphakit Thongthawee
98	FW	THA	Aphiwat Mitrak
99	FW	THA	Jakkrit Jitsabay

=== Out on loan ===
Note: Flags indicate national team as defined under FIFA eligibility rules; some limited exceptions apply. Players may hold more than one non-FIFA nationality.

No. / Pos. / Nation / Player	No. / Pos. / Nation / Player

Note: The official club website lists the supporters as player #12.

== Coaching staff ==
Position	Name
Head coach	(Thailand) Apisak Asayut
Assistant head coach	(Thailand) Pattanapong Sripramoj (Thailand) Nirut Surasieng (Thailand) Chakkrit Boonkham
Goalkeeper coach	(Thailand) Sthiti Phaengma
Fitness coach	(Thailand) Wattana Nuttat
Physiotherapist	(Thailand) Dr. Acira Hiruntrakul
Physiotherapist	(Thailand) Sittisak Sriwijarn
Team Officer	(Thailand) Veerasil Wongveerachai (Thailand) Noppadol Intako (Thailand) Kraisorn Supsin (Thailand) Nuengruthai Praikhet

== Honours ==
=== Domestic leagues ===
- Thai League 3
  - Runners-up (1): 2017
- Thai League 3 Upper Region
  - Champions (1): 2017
- Thai Division 1 League
  - Runners-up (1): 2010

== Affiliated clubs ==
- (Japan) Hokkaido Consadole Sapporo
