= Mukdahan Chaiyuenyong F.C. =

Thai semi professional football club

Mukdahan Chaiyuenyong มุกดาหาร ไชยยืนยง
- Full name: Mukdahan Chaiyuenyong Football Club มุกดาหาร ไชยยืนยง เอฟซี
- Nicknames: The Giant Catfish (บึกพิฆาต)
- Short name: MDHLK
- Founded: 2009; 17 years ago
- Ground: Saharue industrial factory field Mukdahan, Thailand
- Capacity: 5,000
- Chairman: Sakchai Jaroenwuttimakorn
- Manager: Srinakorn Kotrbut
- League: Thai League 4
Home colours	Away colours

Mukdahan Chaiyuenyong Football Club (Thai มุกดาหาร ไชยยืนยง เอฟซี), is a Thai semi professional football club based in Mukdahan province. The club currently play in Thai League 4 North Eastern Region.

== Timeline ==
History of events of Mukdahan City Football Club

Year	Important events
2009	The club is formed as Mukdahan-Savannakhet Football Club, nicknamed The Perfume Flower Trees; Club admitted to the Regional League North Eastern Division; Home games to be played at Mukdahan Municipality Stadium; Ekkapob Potisai named as the first ever coach of Mukdahan

== Stadium and locations ==
Coordinates	Location	Stadium	Year
16°32′37″N 104°43′15″E	Mukdahan	Mukdahan Province Stadium	2009–2016
16°24′24″N 104°30′36″E	Mukdahan	Nikhom Kham Soi District Stadium (Kok Daeng)	2017

== Season by season record ==
Season	League									FA Cup	League Cup	Top goalscorer	
Season	Division	P	W	D	L	F	A	Pts	Pos	FA Cup	League Cup	Name	Goals
2009	North-East	20	3	10	7	25	33	19	9th				
2010	North-East	30	6	9	15	32	48	27	15th				
2011	North-East	30	4	10	16	26	47	22	13th	R1			
2012	North-East	30	4	6	20	20	64	18	15th		QR1		
2013	North-East	30	5	4	21	24	73	19	16th	R1			
2014	North-East	26	1	5	20	15	65	8	14th	R1			
2015	North-East	34	4	3	27	23	90	15	18th	Not Enter	Not Enter		
2016	North-East	26	4	4	18	16	47	16	13th	Not Enter	QR1		
2017	T4 North-East	33	7	8	18	45	76	29	12th	Not Enter	Not Enter		

Champions	Runners-up	Third place	Promoted	Relegated

- P = Played
- W = Games won
- D = Games drawn
- L = Games lost
- F = Goals for
- A = Goals against
- Pts = Points
- Pos = Final position
- QR1 = First Qualifying Round
- QR2 = Second Qualifying Round
- R1 = Round 1
- R2 = Round 2
- R3 = Round 3
- R4 = Round 4
- R5 = Round 5
- R6 = Round 6
- QF = Quarter-finals
- SF = Semi-finals
- RU = Runners-up
- W = Winners

== Players ==
=== Current squad ===
Note: Flags indicate national team as defined under FIFA eligibility rules; some limited exceptions apply. Players may hold more than one non-FIFA nationality.

No.	Pos.	Nation	Player
1	GK	THA	Prayoon Juengprasert
2	DF	THA	Bantherng Wannawat
3	DF	THA	Siwaporn Prathan
4	DF	THA	Dechnarong Chanthakot
5	DF	THA	Kuntapat Kittana
7	MF	THA	Nithinan Uthawong
8	MF	THA	Thirawut Mitrthongchai
10	MF	THA	Thanongsak Pongduang
11	MF	THA	Sarawut Preechaphanuwat
12	DF	THA	Jetsadaporn Phosai
13	MF	THA	Noom Roopdee
14	FW	THA	Nopparat Intha
15	FW	THA	Ronnachai Nakpranil
16	MF	THA	Nutchapol Sueblao
17	FW	THA	Athipapat Raweewatcharatopat

No.	Pos.	Nation	Player
18	GK	THA	Anan Sommee
19	MF	THA	Nutthapol Thipparos
20	DF	THA	Weerayut Khongmon
21	DF	THA	Ronnachai Chaisena
23	DF	THA	Thanapong Chuenta
24	MF	THA	Boworn Nakkasan
25	DF	GUI	Djiba Sylla
26	GK	THA	Nawin Khampo
27	DF	THA	Pornphithak Thawinkorn
28	FW	THA	Numpol Kittiporn
29	FW	THA	Weerawut Theppakun
30	DF	THA	Sarawut Hongchoota
31	DF	LAO	Kidsamon Nanthawong
32	FW	LAO	Jinda Kaewmeechai
33	FW	THA	Witsanu Sirikul
34	FW	THA	Surasak Sri Aksorn
35	MF	THA	Thammanoon Sasen
