= Melvin Kicmett =

Liberian footballer

Personal information
- Full name: Melvin Okoro Kicmett
- Date of birth: May 19, 1988 (age 38)
- Place of birth: Liberia
- Height: 1.74 m (5 ft 8 1/2 in)
- Position: Striker

Senior career*
Years	Team	Apps	(Gls)
?–?	Gardnersville		
2004	Haja		
2005–2006	Black Star		
2007	LPRC Oilers		
2007	Tonnerre Yaoundé		
2008–2009	Union Douala		
2009–2013	Cercle Olympique Bamako		
2013	Yala		
2013–2015	Phichit		
2016	Air Force Central		
2016	Udon Thani	6	(1)
2020–2021	Thonburi University	18	(6)

International career
2005–	Liberia	24	(5)
- * Club domestic league appearances and goals as of 13:42, 08 March 2008 (UTC)

Melvin Okoro Kicmett (born May 19, 1988) is a Liberian footballer who played as a striker.

== International career ==
He is also a member of the Liberia national football team.
