= Seiya Sugishita =

Japanese footballer

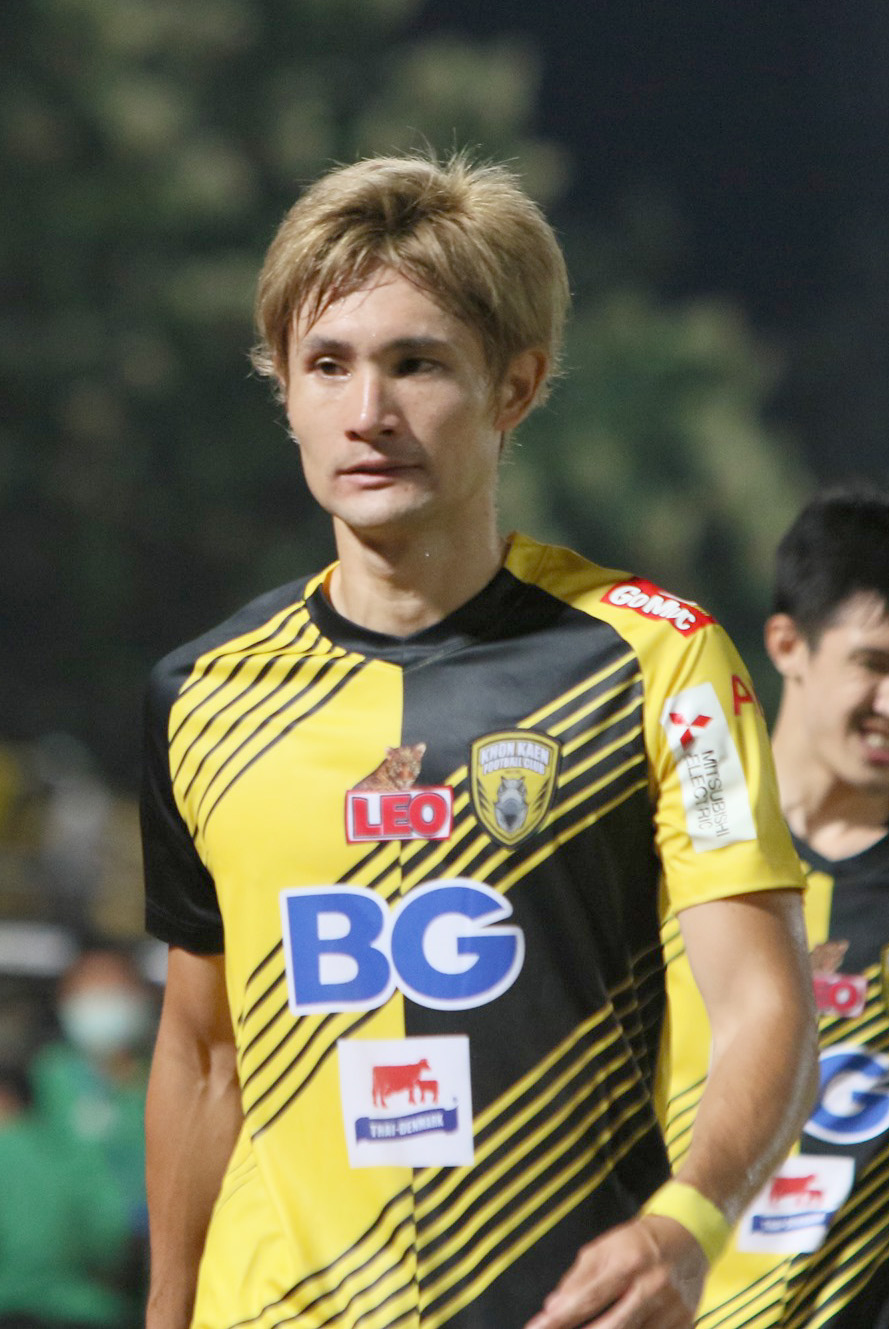
- Sugishita with Khonkaen in 2020

Personal information
- Full name: Seiya Sugishita
- Date of birth: 15 April 1988 (age 38)
- Place of birth: Saitama, Japan
- Height: 1.75 m (5 ft 9 in)
- Position: Striker

Senior career*
Years	Team	Apps	(Gls)
2011	Saitama SC		
2012–2013	Sporting Goa	18	(4)
2013	Saitama SC		
2014	Trat		
2015–2016	Saitama SC		
2017–2018	Rayong		
2019–2021	Khonkaen	56	(24)
2021–2022	Chiangmai	22	(7)
2022–2023	Rayong	7	(1)
2023	Bankhai United	5	(0)
- * Club domestic league appearances and goals as of 30 April 2023

Seiya Sugishita (杉下 聖哉, Sugishita Seiya; born 15 April 1988) is a Japanese footballer who plays as a striker.

== Career ==
=== Sporting Goa ===
Sugishita made his debut for Sporting Clube de Goa on 18 November 2012 during an I-League match against United Sikkim F.C. at the Fatorda Stadium in Goa in which he played till 93rd minute. Sporting Goa won the match 2–1.

== Career statistics ==
=== Club ===
Statistics accurate as of December 4, 2022.

Season	Club	Competition	Appearances	Gol	Assist	Yellow cards	Red cards	Minutes played
2012-2013	Sporting Club de Goa	I-League	17	4	-	2	-	878'
2016-2017	Rayong F.C.	Thai League Cup	1	-	-	-	-	90'
2016-2017	Rayong F.C.	Thai FA Cup	1	-	-	-	-	90'
2017-2018	Rayong F.C.	Thai League Cup	1	-	-	-	-	120'
2017-2018	Rayong F.C.	Thai FA Cup	1	1	-	-	-	56'
2018-2019	Khon Kaen F.C.	Thai League 2	25	12	-	4	-	2.150'
2020-2021	Khon Kaen F.C.	Thai League 2	31	12	1	6	1	2.689'
2021-2022	Chiangmai F.C.	Thai League 2	22	7	1	-	-	1.419'
2021-2022	Chiangmai F.C.	Thai FA Cup	-	-	-	-	-	-
2022-2023	Chiangmai F.C.	Thai League 2	2	-	-	-	-	180'
Career total			101	36	2	12	1	7.672'
