= Mahasarakham CC F.C. =

Thai football club

Mahasarakham CC มหาสารคาม ซีซี
- Full name: Mahasarakham CC Football Club
- Nicknames: The Mealy Crabs (ปูม่วงมหากาฬ)
- Short name: MSKFC
- Founded: 2009; 17 years ago
- Ground: Mahasarakham Province Stadium; Maha Sarakham, Thailand
- Capacity: 4,347
- Chairman: Kanyarat Laopakdee
- Head Coach: Dusit Chalermsan
- League: Thai League 2
- 2025–26: Thai League 2, 8th of 18
Home colours	Away colours

Mahasarakham CC Football Club (Thai สโมสรฟุตบอลมหาสารคาม ซีซี), is a Thai football club based in Mahasarakham, Thailand. They currently play in Thai League 2.

== Timeline ==
History of events Mahasarakham City Football Club

Year	Important events
2009	The club is formed as Mahasarakham Football Club, nicknamed Isaan Tigers; Club admitted to the Regional League North Eastern Division; Home games to be played at Mahasarakham Stadium, capacity, 4,347; Pinet Daoruang named as the first ever coach of Mahasarakham
2010	Renamed Mahasarakham City and unveil new club logo
2011	Renamed Mahasarakham United and unveil new club logo; Some home games now played at Mahasarakham Rajabhat University Stadium, Nakhon Sawan Road.
2015	Renamed Mahasarakham and unveil new club logo

In 2022, Mahasarakham SBT competed in the Thai League 3 for the 2022–23 season. It is their 14th season in the professional league. The club started the season with a 1–0 away win over Yasothon and they ended the season with a 3–1 home win over Yasothon. The club has finished 1st place in the league of the Northeastern region and advanced to the national championship stage. In addition, in the 2022–23 Thai FA Cup Mahasarakham SBT was defeated 0–1 by Assawin Kohkwang United in the first round, causing them to be eliminated and in the 2022–23 Thai League Cup Mahasarakham SBT was defeated 0–1 by Nakhon Ratchasima United in the first qualification round, causing them to be eliminated too.

== Stadium and locations ==
Coordinates	Location	Stadium	Year
16°12′00″N 103°15′57″E	Mahasarakham	IPE Mahasarakham Stadium	2009–2011
16°11′55″N 103°16′24″E	Mahasarakham	Mahasarakham Rajabhat University Stadium	2012–2013
16°12′00″N 103°15′57″E	Mahasarakham	IPE Mahasarakham Stadium	2014
16°09′15″N 103°18′59″E	Mahasarakham	Mahasarakham Province Stadium	2015–present

== Season by season record ==
Season	League									FA Cup	League Cup	T3 Cup	Top goalscorer	
Season	Division	P	W	D	L	F	A	Pts	Pos	FA Cup	League Cup	T3 Cup	Name	Goals
2009	Northeast	20	5	5	10	29	42	20	8th	Opted out				
2010	Northeast	30	9	10	11	47	47	37	9th	R1	Opted out		Manusachai Phupaisit; Sebastien Tonsant	8
2011	Northeast	30	4	15	11	21	30	27	11th	Opted out	Opted out			
2012	Northeast	30	11	12	7	38	24	45	8th	Opted out	QR1			
2013	Northeast	30	11	12	7	34	27	45	7th	Opted out	QR2			
2014	Northeast	26	11	6	9	29	31	39	5th	Opted out	R1			
2015	Northeast	34	8	5	21	35	73	29	15th	Opted out	QR1			
2016	Northeast	26	11	7	8	40	36	40	6th	Opted out	Opted out			
2017	T4 Northeast	33	12	8	13	52	67	44	7th	Opted out	Opted out		(Thailand) Rewat Yothapakdee	17
2018	T4 Northeast	26	7	9	10	31	37	30	10th	Opted out	QR1		(Thailand) Rewat Yothapakdee	12
2019	T4 Northeast	24	4	9	11	18	29	21	12th	Opted out	Opted out		(Thailand) Nitipong Ruangsa	4
2020–21	T3 Northeast	15	3	2	10	17	45	11	11th	Opted out	QR2		(Thailand) Teerathep Pangkam	4
2021–22	T3 Northeast	24	9	5	10	30	32	32	7th	R2	QRP		(Brazil) Fellipe Cabral Veloso Santos	5
2022–23	T3 Northeast	24	15	7	2	40	17	52	1st	R1	QR1		(Thailand) Nattapon Thaptanon, (Thailand) Wanit Chaisan	9
2023–24	T3 Northeast	24	16	6	2	68	26	54	2nd	QR	R1	R2	(Brazil) Leandro Assumpção	18
2024–25	T2	32	13	9	10	44	39	48	5th	R2	QPR	–	(Brazil) Leandro Assumpção	12
2025–26	T2	34	12	9	13	47	42	45	8th	R1	QF	–	(Myanmar) Lwin Moe Aung	7

Champions	Runners-up	Third Place	Promoted	Relegated

- P = Played
- W = Games won
- D = Games drawn
- L = Games lost
- F = Goals for
- A = Goals against
- Pts = Points
- Pos = Final position
- QR1 = First Qualifying Round
- QR2 = Second Qualifying Round
- R1 = Round 1
- R2 = Round 2
- R3 = Round 3
- R4 = Round 4
- R5 = Round 5
- R6 = Round 6
- QF = Quarter-finals
- SF = Semi-finals
- RU = Runners-up
- W = Winners

== Players ==
=== Current squad ===
Note: Flags indicate national team as defined under FIFA eligibility rules; some limited exceptions apply. Players may hold more than one non-FIFA nationality.

No.	Pos.	Nation	Player
4	DF	BRA	Sávio Maciel
6	MF	KOR	Kang Hyeon
7	DF	THA	Satsanapong Wattayuchutikul
8	MF	THA	Sundy Wongderree
9	FW	BRA	Gildo
10	FW	THA	Chenrop Samphaodi
14	MF	THA	Punnawat Chote-Jirachaithon
15	GK	THA	Kittikun Jamsuwan
17	MF	THA	Kantinan Chanmunti
18	GK	THA	Chaloempat Ploywanrattana
19	FW	THA	Apiwit Samurmuen
22	DF	THA	Nathan James (on loan from BG Pathum United)
23	FW	THA	Chitchanok Xaysensourinthone

No.	Pos.	Nation	Player
24	DF	THA	Prasittichai Perm
25	MF	THA	Natthaphon Piamplai
28	DF	THA	Parinya Utapao
29	MF	THA	Teerapak Punboonchu
33	MF	KOR	Kang Eun-soo
36	DF	THA	Petcharat Chotipala
37	MF	THA	Kongpop Artserm
39	DF	THA	Waradorn Unard (on loan from Phrae United)
88	FW	THA	Ardriw Chatanan
91	DF	THA	Abib-Ali Sikder
95	FW	THA	Sajjaporn Tumsuwan
97	GK	THA	Chutideth Maunchaingam

== Club staff ==
Position	Name
General Manager	(Thailand) Pongsakorn Tantachanya
Team Manager	(Thailand) Chuchot Ketwiriyakan
Head coach	(Thailand) Dusit Chalermsan
Assistant coach	(Thailand) Nantachot Pona (Thailand) Sumon Klaakrob (Thailand) Woraphan Tunton
Goalkeeper coach	(Thailand) Chinnakorn Deesai
Fitness coach	(Thailand) Thepnarong Mimak
Physiotherapist	(Thailand) Sumala Banjamat
Assistant Physiotherapist	(Thailand) Rungnapa Sisutad (Thailand) Thanawat Pattanasaeng
Content Creator	(Thailand) Phanuwat Kinnaree
Team Staff	(Thailand) Pattawee Singcharee (Thailand) Thanaphon Kanokngein

== Honours ==
=== Domestic leagues ===
- Thai League 3 North Eastern Region
  - Winners (1): 2022–23
