= Udon Thani F.C. =

Thai football club

Udon Thani อุดรธานี เอฟซี
- Full name: Udon Thani Football Club สโมสรฟุตบอลจังหวัดอุดรธานี
- Nicknames: The Orange Giants (ยักษ์แสด)
- Short name: UDFC
- Founded: 1999; 27 years ago
- Dissolved: 2022; 4 years ago
- Ground: Institute of Physical Education Udon Thani Stadium; Udon Thani, Thailand
- Capacity: 3,500
- League: Thailand Amateur League
- 2022–23: 18th of 18 (Relegated)
Home colours	Away colours

Udon Thani Football Club (Thai: สโมสรฟุตบอลจังหวัดอุดรธานี) was a Thai defunct professional association football club based in Udon Thani province. The club was founded in 1999 and started to play in Provincial League.

== History ==
The team was founded in 1999 by the first chairman, Sathaporn Kotabut, and joined the Thailand Provincial League or Pro League in 1999. They competed in this league until 2004. Their best season was a 4th-place finish in their inaugural campaign. The club did not participate in the League from 2005 to 2008.

In 2009 the club made a comeback and joined AIS Regional League Division 2 North Eastern region, with new chairman, Pongsart Kitjanukorn. They finished the season in 3rd place. The club was then registered as a corporation in order to make it professional. Udon Thani FC was playing in Division 2 North Eastern region.

In 2011 the club was playing in Division 2 North Eastern region. In November 2012 Samretwot Yothawijit come to take over the club and the main policy was "Udon Thani FC belongs to all Udon Thani's people" and main target was to take the club to Division 1. Udon Thani FC was playing in Division 2 North Eastern region, where they finished 3rd. Udon Thani FC finished 2nd in Division 2 North Eastern region and qualified for the promotion play-off. There they were drawn into group B, where they ended in 5th place.

In 2014, they were playing in Division 2 North Eastern region. The coach Phithaya Santawong got replaced in the mid-season break with Wutthiwat Dangsamerkiat returning. He was also the coach back in 2011. Udon Thani FC is playing in Division 2 North Eastern region. Udon Thani FC is playing in Division 2 North Eastern region.

In 2017 the club was pass to play in professional league first time in 2018 Thai League 2 that they try to promoted to this league for a long time by finished third place in 2017 Thai League 3.

In 2022 the club was dissolved due to financial problem.

== Stadium and locations ==
Coordinates	Location	Stadium	Capacity	Year
17°24′20″N 102°46′09″E	Udon Thani	Thai National Sports University Udon Thani Campus Stadium	3,500	1999–2004; 2009–2015; 2018; 2020–2021; 2022–
17°23′56″N 102°47′28″E	Udon Thani	Udon Thani Rajabhat University Stadium	3,500	2016–2017
17°26′55″N 102°54′59″E	Udon Thani	SAT Stadium Udon Thani	10,000	2019; 2021–2022

== Honours ==
=== Domestic competitions ===
- Regional League North-East Division
  - Winners (1) : 2016
  - Runners-up (2) : 2013, 2014

== Season by season record ==
Udon Thani did not participate in the League from 2005 to 2008.

Season	League									Promotion Play-off	FA Cup	League Cup	Top goalscorer	
Season	Division	P	W	D	L	F	A	Pts	Pos	Promotion Play-off	FA Cup	League Cup	Name	Goals
1999–2000	Pro League	22	12	2	8	35	26	38	4th	No competition		No competition		
2001	Pro League	22							4th	No competition		No competition		
2002	Pro League	10	2	1	7	8	19	7	6th	No competition	No competition	No competition		
2003	Pro League	22	7	6	9	25	31	27	8th	No competition	No competition	No competition		
2004	Pro League	18	2	10	6	18	29	16	9th	No competition	No competition	No competition		
2005–2008	Not enter	–	–	–	–	–	–	–	–	No competition	No competition	No competition	–	–
2009	North-East	20	10	5	5	45	21	35	3rd	Not qualified	R1	No competition		
2010	North-East	30	12	6	12	39	43	42	7th	Not qualified	Not Enter	Not Enter		
2011	North-East	30	10	9	11	41	46	39	9th	Not qualified	Not Enter	R1		
2012	North-East	30	16	8	6	37	23	56	3rd	Not qualified	QR1	R1	Ousmanou Mohamadou	15
2013	North-East	30	18	5	7	53	25	59	2nd	5th	Not Enter	QF	Oyewole Yemi Joseph	15
2014	North-East	26	15	5	6	35	16	50	2nd	3rd	Not Enter	R1	Tomiwa Bolarinwa	7
2015	North-East	34	21	8	5	78	29	71	3rd	3rd	Not Enter	QR2	Promphong Kransumrong	32
2016	North-East	26	18	4	4	55	17	58	Champions	QF	Not Enter	Not Enter	Natthaphat Somsri	10
2017	T3 Upper	26	15	7	4	43	18	52	2nd	Winner	QR	Not Enter	Valci Júnior	16
2018	T2	28	9	7	12	33	35	34	7th	No play-offs	R1	R1	Milan Bubalo; Miloš Stojanović	5
2019	T2	34	15	6	13	44	43	51	7th	No play-offs	QR1	QR3	Bruno Correa	18
2020–21	T2	34	9	11	14	44	46	38	15th	Not qualified	R1	No competition	João Paulo Sales	8
2021–22	T2	34	13	8	13	53	58	47	8th	Not qualified	R1	Not Enter	Thales Lima	13
2022–23	T2	34	6	3	25	31	87	21	18th	Not qualified	R1	R1	Greg Houla	8
2023–24	Failed to get a license													

Champions	Runners-up	Third place	Promoted	Relegated

- P = Played
- W = Games won
- D = Games drawn
- L = Games lost
- F = Goals for
- A = Goals against
- Pts = Points
- Pos = Final position
- QR1 = First Qualifying Round
- QR2 = Second Qualifying Round
- R1 = Round 1
- R2 = Round 2
- R3 = Round 3
- R4 = Round 4
- R5 = Round 5
- R6 = Round 6
- QF = Quarter-finals
- SF = Semi-finals
- RU = Runners-up
- W = Winners

== Hall of Fame ==
=== 100 Appearances Players ===
100 Appearances Players (2009–present)

- (Thailand) Satja Saengsuwan
- (Thailand) Ratchanon Phangkaew
- (Thailand) Thanathip Paengwong
- (Thailand) Amnach Worawiboon
- (Thailand) Tredsak Samart
- (Thailand) Chaimongkol Botnok
- (Thailand) Jetsada Badcharee

* Senior club appearances counted for all league, FA-cup, league cup and play-off games.

== Coaches ==
Coaches by Years (2009–2023)

- (Thailand) Phithaya Santawong 2009
- (Thailand) Wittaya Kantanapakdee 2010
- (Thailand) Phithaya Santawong 2010–2011
- (Thailand) Voottivat Daengsamerkiat 2011
- (Thailand) Supon Yapapha 2012
- (South Korea) Park No Bong 2012
- (Thailand) Phithaya Santawong 2012–2014
- (Thailand) Voottivat Daengsamerkiat 2014
- (Thailand) Somkait Fongpach 2014
- (Thailand) Worradet Phuprapri 2014–2015
- (Thailand) Hannarong Chunhakunakorn 2015
- (Thailand) Somkait Fongpach 2015
- (Thailand) Choketawee Promrut 2016
- (Thailand) Paniphon Kerdyam 2017
- (Thailand) Chalermwoot Sa-ngapol 2017
- (Thailand) Uthai Boonmoh 2018
- (England) Darren Read 2018
- (Thailand) Watcharapong Klahan 2018
- (Thailand) Paniphon Kerdyam 2018–2019
- (Thailand) Jakarat Tonhongsa 2020
- (Thailand) Jetsada Jitsawad 2020
- (Thailand) Paniphon Kerdyam 2020
- (Germany) Jörg Steinebrunner 2020–2021
- (Thailand) Sirisak Yodyardthai 2021
- (Brazil) Fernando Sales 2021
- (Argentina) Daniel Blanco 2021
- (Germany) Hagen Hübner (interim coach) 2021
- (Thailand) Wuttiya Yongant (interim coach) 2021
- (Germany) Jörg Steinebrunner 2021
- (Brazil) Reuther Moreira 2022
- (Thailand) Chalermwoot Sa-ngapol 2022
- (Thailand) Paniphon Kerdyam 2022
- (Singapore) Akbar Nawas 2022
- (Brazil) Mavi Lopes 2022–2023
- (Singapore) Akbar Nawas 2023
