= Joo Dai-min =

South Korean footballer

Personal information
- Date of birth: 21 January 1988 (age 38)
- Place of birth: South Korea
- Position: Defender

Team information
- Current team: Nongbua Pitchaya
- Number: 3

Youth career
- Soongsil High School

Senior career*
Years	Team	Apps	(Gls)
2012–2015	Saraburi	83	(6)
2016–	Nongbua Pitchaya	19	(4)
Korean name
Hangul	주대민
RR	Ju Daemin
MR	Chu Taemin
- * Club domestic league appearances and goals as of 16 July 2015

Joo Dai-min or Dai Min Joo (born 21 January 1988) is a South Korean professional footballer who plays as a defender for Thai club Nongbua Pitchaya, He has played in the Thai Premier League and the Thai Division 1 League.
