= 50th Anniversary Stadium of Khon Kaen University =

Multi-purpose stadium in Khon Kaen Province, Thailand

Coordinates: 16.476767°N 102.817386°E

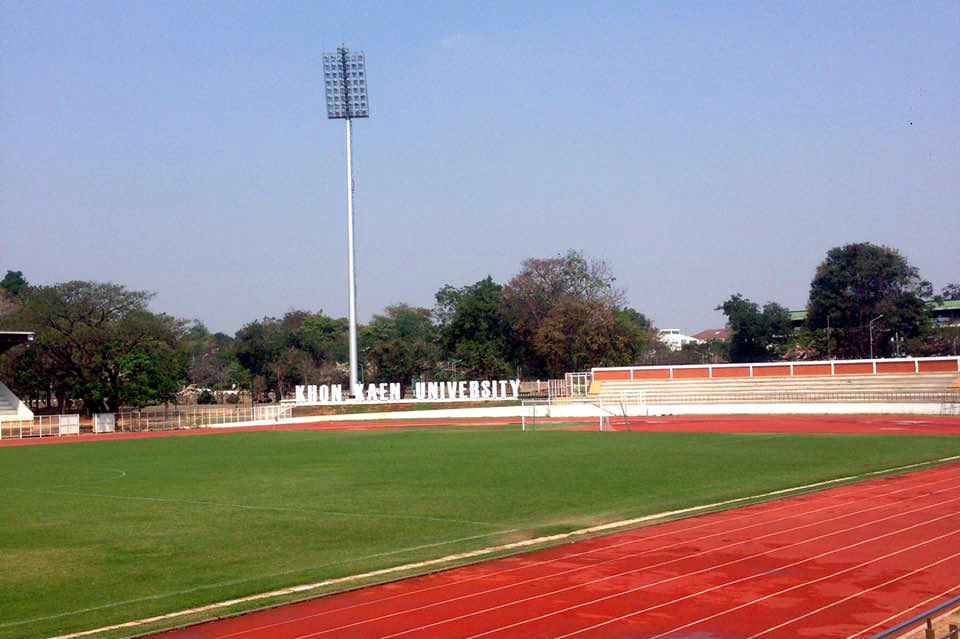
- Interactive map of 50th Anniversary Stadium of Khon Kaen University
- Location: Khon Kaen, Thailand
- Public transit: Khon Kaen LRT: at KKU Gate T-Junction LRT Station (from 2019)
- Owner: Khon Kaen University
- Operator: Khon Kaen University
- Capacity: 8,000
- Surface: Grass

50th Anniversary Stadium of Khon Kaen University (Thai: สนามกีฬากลาง 50 ปี มหาวิทยาลัยขอนแก่น) is a multi-purpose stadium in Khon Kaen Province, Thailand. It is currently used mostly for football matches. The stadium holds 8,000 people.
