= Victor Mensah =

Ghanaian footballer

Personal information
- Full name: Victor Mensah
- Date of birth: December 25, 1985 (age 40)
- Place of birth: Bolgatanga, Ghana
- Height: 1.79 m (5 ft 10 1/2 in)
- Position: Midfielder

Team information
- Current team: Nong Bua Lamphu
- Number: 19

Senior career*
Years	Team	Apps	(Gls)
2008–2009	Provincial Electricity Authority	21	(7)
2010	→ Buriram (Loan)	11	(1)
2011–2012	Rajpracha	19	(2)
2016–	Nong Bua Lamphu		
- * Club domestic league appearances and goals as of 11 October 2008

Victor Mensah (born 25 December 1985) is a Ghanaian professional footballer who plays as a midfielder for Thai League T2 club Nongbua Pitchaya.

== Career ==
=== Provincial Electricity Authority ===
He joined in 2008 to Provincial Electricity Authority and won the Thailand Premier League in 2008.

== Honours ==
=== Club ===
Provincial Electricity Authority

- Thai Premier League (1): 2008
