= Mukdahan Province Stadium =

- Interactive map of Mukdahan Province Stadium
- Location: Mukdahan, Thailand
- Coordinates: 16°32′37″N 104°43′15″E
- Owner: Mukdahan Provincial Administrative Organization
- Capacity: 5,000
- Surface: Grass

Tenants
- Mukdahan F.C. (2010–2011); Mukdahan Chaiyuenyong F.C. (2009–2016)

Mukdahan Province Stadium (Thai: สนามกีฬาจังหวัดมุกดาหาร), also known as Mukdahan Central Stadium (สนามกีฬากลางจังหวัดมุกดาหาร), is a multi-purpose stadium in Mueang Mukdahan District, Mukdahan province, Thailand. It is currently used mostly for football matches and is the former home stadium of Mukdahan F.C. and Mukdahan Chaiyuenyong F.C.

== History ==
The stadium has served as a central sporting venue for Mukdahan province for many years. It was the home ground of Mukdahan F.C. from 2010 to 2011 and later hosted Mukdahan Chaiyuenyong F.C. from 2009 to 2016.

In December 2022, the stadium hosted the "Family Run" event organized by the Sports Authority of Thailand to celebrate National Sports Day. In March 2026, the stadium was the main venue for the "Mukdahan Champions Cup 2026", a provincial football tournament opened by the Governor of Mukdahan.

== Facilities ==
The stadium features a grass football pitch surrounded by running tracks. It has a seating capacity of 5,000.

Additional amenities include a basketball court, a swimming pool, and areas for group exercises. The stadium is maintained by the Mukdahan Provincial Administrative Organization.

== Usage ==
Besides football, the stadium is used for athletics, local sporting events, and civic activities. It has hosted provincial running events and football tournaments, serving as a community sports hub.
