= Amnat Charoen Province Stadium =

Multi-purpose stadium in Amnat Charoen province, Thailand

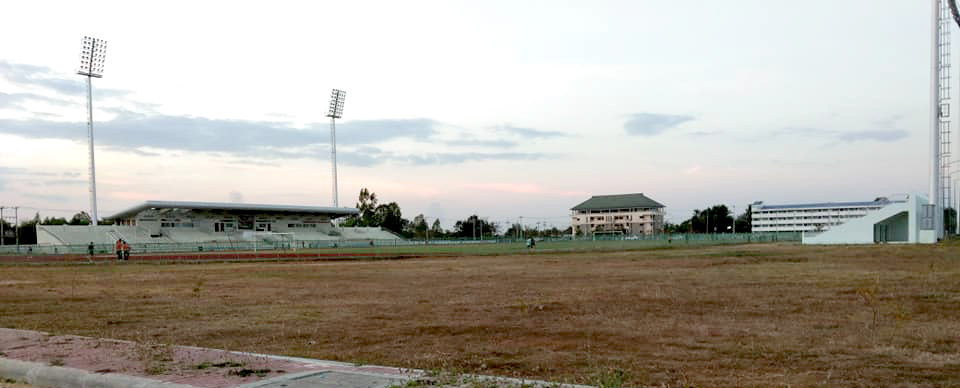
- Interactive map of Amnat Charoen Province Stadium
- Location: Amnat Charoen, Thailand
- Coordinates: 15°53′44″N 104°36′43″E
- Capacity: 5,000
- Surface: Grass

Tenant
- Amnat Poly United F.C.

Amnat Charoen Province Stadium (Thai: สนามกีฬาจังหวัดอำนาจเจริญ) is a multi-purpose stadium in Amnat Charoen province, Thailand. It is currently used mostly for football matches and is the home stadium of Amnat Poly United F.C. The stadium holds approximately 5,000 people.
