= Ubon Rachathani Sports School Stadium =

Stadium in Ubon Ratchathani Province, Thailand

Ubon Ratchathani Sports School Stadium
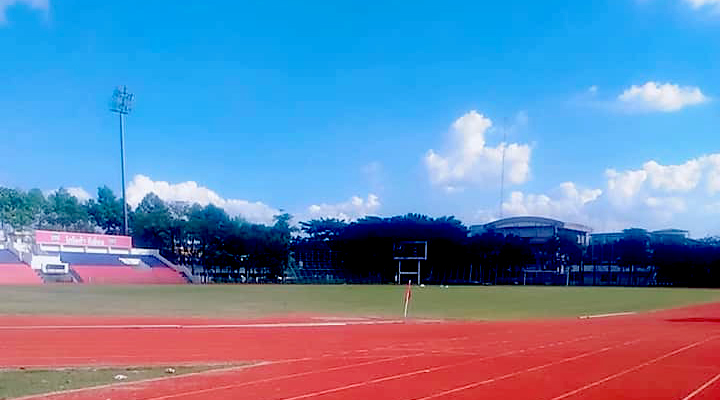
- Ubon Rachathani Sports School Stadium
- Interactive map of Ubon Ratchathani Sports School Stadium
- Location: Ubon Ratchathani, Thailand
- Coordinates: 15°15′06″N 104°50′53″E
- Surface: Grass

Tenant
- [Ubon Kruanapat F.C.] 2010-2011

Ubon Rachathani Sports School Stadium (Thai: สนาม รร.กีฬาอุบลราชธานี หรือ สนามสุนีย์สเตเดี้ยม) is a multi-purpose stadium in Ubon Ratchathani Province, Thailand. It is currently used mostly for football matches and is the home stadium of Ubon Kruanapat F.C.
