= Udon Thani Rajabhat University Stadium =

Multi-purpose stadium in Udon Thani, Thailand

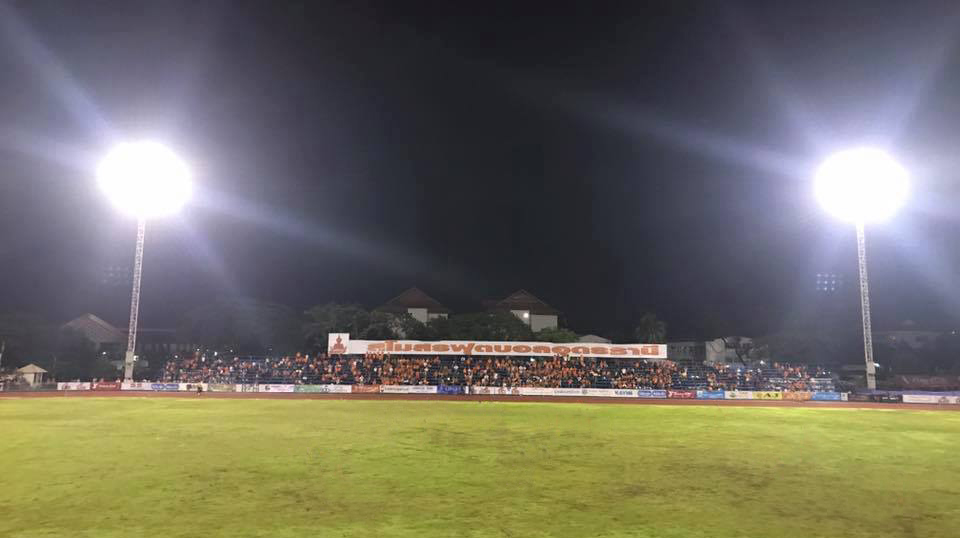
- Interactive map of Udon Thani Rajabhat University Stadium
- Location: Udon Thani, Thailand
- Coordinates: 17°23′56″N 102°47′28″E
- Owner: Udon Thani Rajabhat University
- Operator: Udon Thani Rajabhat University
- Capacity: 3,500
- Surface: Grass

Udon Thani Rajabhat University Stadium (Thai: สนามมหาวิทยาลัยราชภัฎอุดรธานี) is a multi-purpose stadium located in Udon Thani Province, Thailand. It is primarily used for football matches.
