= 2011 Thai League Cup Qualifying Rounds =

The 2011 Thai League Cup is the 2nd season of the longest-running Football Association of Thailand cup competition. 97 clubs were accepted for the competition, this is the first edition of the competition and the qualifying round will be played in regions featuring clubs from the Regional League Division 2. Tak, Mahasarakham United and Thanyaburi RA United have lucky of lotting to automatic qualify to First round.

== Calendar ==
Round	Date	Matches	Clubs	New entries this round
Qualifying First Round	18 May 2011	29	58 → 21 to First Round and 8 to Qualifying Second Round	58
Qualifying Second Round	1 June 2011; 2 June 2011	8	8 → 4	

== Northern Region ==
The qualifying round will be played in regions featuring clubs from the 2011 Thai Division 2 League Northern Region
(6 berth including Tak have lucky of lotting to automatic qualify to First round.)

=== Qualifying First round ===
Team 1	Score	Team 2
18 May 2011
Kamphaeng Phet	1–2	Nan
Phetchabun	3–2	Uttaradit Mhorseng
Chiangrai	2–2 (4 – 5 p)	Phrae United
Phitsanulok	2–3	Singburi
Phayao	0–1	Nakhon Sawan

== North Eastern Region ==
The qualifying round will be played in regions featuring clubs from the 2011 Thai Division 2 League North Eastern Region
(6 berth including Mahasarakham United have lucky of lotting to automatic qualify to First round.)

=== Qualifying First round ===
Team 1	Score	Team 2
18 May 2011
Sakon Nakhon	1–3	Nakhon Ratchasima
Ubon Tiger	1–1 (1 – 3 p)	Udon Thani
Kalasin	4–0	Nong Khai F.T.
Surin	3–5	Nakhon Phanom
Yasothon United	7–4	Nong Bua Lamphu
Roi Et United	2–1	Loei City

=== Qualifying Second round ===
Team 1	Score	Team 2
1 June 2011
Nakhon Phanom	3–0	Yasothon United

== Central & Eastern Region ==
The qualifying round will be played in regions featuring clubs from the 2011 Thai Division 2 League Central & Eastern Region
(6 berth )

=== Qualifying First round ===
Team 1	Score	Team 2
18 May 2011
Ayutthaya	4–0	Nakhon Nayok
Phetchaburi	1–1 (5 – 3 p)	Samut Sakhon
Ang Thong	1–0	Cha Choeng Sao
Kabin City	1–0	Pathum Thani-Nawa Nakhon
Samut Prakan	1–0	Ratchaburi
Rayong	2–0	Prachinburi United
Sa Kaeo City	0–1	Muangkan

=== Qualifying Second round ===
Team 1	Score	Team 2
1 June 2011
Rayong	1–0	Muangkan

== Bangkok & field Region ==
The qualifying round will be played in regions featuring clubs from the 2011 Thai Division 2 League Bangkok & field Region
(6 berth including Thanyaburi RA United have lucky of lotting to automatic qualify to First round.)

=== Qualifying First round ===
Team 1	Score	Team 2
18 May 2011
Paknampho NSRU	0–3	Chamchuri United
Kasetsart University	1–0	Assumption Thonburi
Raj-Vithi	1–1 (4 – 5 p)	Prachinburi
Bangkok Christian College	3–1	Royal Thai Fleet
Thai Air Look Isan	0–1	Maptaphut Rayong
Nonthaburi	1–2	Globlex
Samut Prakan United	2–3	Kasem Bundit University

=== Qualifying Second round ===
Team 1	Score	Team 2
1 June 2011
Bangkok Christian College	0–1	Maptaphut Rayong
2 June 2011
Kasem Bundit University	3–2	Globlex

== Southern Region ==
The qualifying round will be played in regions featuring clubs from the 2011 Thai Division 2 League Southern Region
(4 berth )

=== Qualifying First round ===
Team 1	Score	Team 2
18 May 2011
Nakhon Si Thammarat	(w/o) ^{1}	Chumphon
Pattani	4–1	Phang Nga
Phattalung	1–0	Nara United
Trang	3–1	Yala

^{1} Nakhon Si Thammarat won because Chumphon withdrew

== Qualified teams ==
Northern

1. Nan
2. Phetchabun
3. Phrae United
4. Singburi
5. Nakhon Sawan

North Eastern

1. Nakhon Ratchasima
2. Udon Thani
3. Kalasin
4. Nakhon Phanom
5. Roi Et United

Central & Eastern

1. Ayutthaya
2. Phetchaburi
3. Ang Thong
4. Kabin City
5. Samut Prakan
6. Rayong

Bangkok & field

1. Chamchuri United
2. Kasetsart University
3. Prachinburi
4. Maptaphut Rayong
5. Kasem Bundit University

Southern

1. Nakhon Si Thammarat
2. Pattani
3. Phattalung
4. Trang

== See also ==
- 2011 Thai League Cup
- Final
