= 2015 Regional League Division 2 Northern Region =

Regional League Northern Region
- Season: 2015
- Champions: Lampang
- Matches played: 181
- Goals scored: 407 (2.25 per match)
- Biggest home win: Phrae Utd 6–0 Phetchabun (16 August 2015)
- Biggest away win: Nan 0–6 Chiangrai City (9 August 2015)
- Longest winning run: 8 games Phrae Utd
- Longest unbeaten run: 13 games Phrae Utd
- Longest losing run: 13 games Nan

2015 Regional League Division 2 Northern Region is the seventh season of the League competition since its establishment in 2009. It is in the third tier of the Thai football league system.

== Changes from last season ==
=== Team changes ===
==== Promoted clubs ====
Sukkhothai and Phichit were promoted to the 2015 Thai Division 1 League.

==== Relegated clubs ====
Phitsanulok were relegated from the 2014 Thai Division 1 League.

==== Relocated clubs ====
Lopburi re-located to the Regional League Northern Division from the Central-East Division 2012.
Singburi re-located to the Regional League Northern Division from the Central-West Division 2014.

==== Withdrawn clubs ====
Uthai Thani and Tak have withdrawn from the 2015 campaign.

=== Expansion clubs ===
Tak City joined the newly expanded league setup.

== Stadium and locations ==
Locations of the 2015 Regional League Northern Teams

Team	Location	Stadium	Capacity	Ref.
Lamphun Warriors	Lamphun	Mae Guang Stadium	3,000	
Uttaradit	Uttaradit	Uttaradit Province Stadium	3,250	
Lopburi	Lopburi	Phra Ramesuan Stadium	3,500	
Singburi	Singburi	Singburi Province Stadium	3,449	
Nakhon Sawan	Nakhon Sawan	Nakhon Sawan Sport School Stadium	?	
Kamphaeng Phet	Kamphaeng Phet	Cha-Kangrao Stadium	2,600	
Tak City	Tak	Tak PAO. Stadium	1,100	
Lampang	Lampang	Nong Kra Ting Stadium	4,700	
Phrae United	Phrae	Thunghong Subdistrict municipality Stadium	4,500	
Phetchabun	Phetchabun	IPE Phetchabun Stadium	2000	
Phitsanulok	Phitsanulok	Phitsanulok Provincial Administrative Organization Stadium	?	
Chiangrai City	Chiang Rai	Chiangrai Province Stadium	5,000	
Phayao	Phayao	Phayao Provincial Administrative Organization Stadium	6,000	
Nan	Nan	Nan Provincial Administrative Organization Stadium	2,500	

== League table ==
Pos	Team	Pld	W	D	L	GF	GA	GD	Pts	Qualification
1	Lampang (C, Q)	26	14	10	2	37	14	+23	52	Champions League Round
2	Chiangrai City (Q)	26	14	9	3	53	22	+31	51	Champions League Round
3	Phrae United	26	14	6	6	33	23	+10	48	
4	Phitsanulok	26	12	11	3	36	19	+17	47	
5	Tak City	26	10	9	7	27	19	+8	39	
6	Phayao	26	10	7	9	28	23	+5	37	
7	Lopburi	26	9	9	8	39	35	+4	36	
8	Lamphun Warrior	26	8	11	7	23	23	0	35	
9	Singburi	26	7	11	8	23	29	−6	32	
10	Kamphaeng Phet	26	8	6	12	33	32	+1	30	
11	Phetchabun	26	7	7	12	27	39	−12	28	
12	Uttaradit	26	6	9	11	22	37	−15	27	
13	Nakhon Sawan	26	4	5	17	27	47	−20	17	
14	Nan	26	3	2	21	20	64	−44	11	

Source: ^{[usurped]}
Rules for classification: 1) points; 2) head-to-head points; 3) head-to-head goal difference; 4) head-to-head goals scored; 5) goal difference; 6) number of goals scored.
(C) Champions; (Q) Qualified for the phase indicated
