= 2018 Thai League 4 Northern Region =

Thai League 4 Northern Region
- Season: 2018
- Champions: Uttaradit
- Relegated: Nakhon Sawan
- Matches played: 63
- Goals scored: 173 (2.75 per match)
- Top goalscorer: (Ivory Coast) Diarra Aboubacar Sidick (12 goals)
- Biggest home win: Nan 7–1 Sukhothai U-23 (7 July 2018)
- Highest scoring: 8 goals Nan 7–1 Sukhothai U-23 (7 July 2018)
- Longest winning run: 7 matches Uttaradit
- Longest unbeaten run: 10 matches Nakhon Mae Sot United
- Longest losing run: 5 matches Nakhon Sawan; Sukhothai U-23
- Highest attendance: 900; Nakhon Mae Sot United 1–0 Sukhothai U-23 (25 February 2018)
- Lowest attendance: 26; Nakhon Mae Sot United 1–2 Sukhothai U-23 (29 July 2018)
- Total attendance: 18,887
- Average attendance: 310

2018 Thai League 4 Northern Region is the 10th season of the League competition since its establishment in 2009. It is in the 4th tier of the Thai football league system.

== Changes from last season ==
=== Promoted clubs ===
Promoted to the 2018 Thai League 3 Upper Region

- JL Chiangmai United
- Chiangrai City

Promoted from the 2017 Thailand Amateur League Northern Region

- Nakhon Mae Sot United

=== Relegated clubs ===
Relegated to the 2018 Thailand Amateur League Northern Region

- Paknampho NSRU

Relegated from the 2017 Thai League 3 Upper Region

- Singburi Bangrajun

==== Suspended clubs ====
- Chiangrai United B is suspended 1 year from 2017 Thai League 4 Northern Region get lower 7th.

=== Expansion clubs ===
- Tak City Club-licensing football club didn't pass to play 2018 Thai League 4 Northern Region. This team is banned 2 years and Relegated to 2020 Thailand Amateur League Northern Region.

=== Reserving clubs ===
- Sukhothai U-23 is Sukhothai Reserving this team which join Northern Region first time.

== Teams ==
=== Stadium and locations ===
Locations of the 2018 Thai League 4 Northern Region Teams

| Team | Province | Stadium | Ref. |
|---|---|---|---|
| Nakhon Mae Sot United | Tak | Naresuan maharaj stadium | |
| Nakhon Sawan | Nakhon Sawan | Nakhon Sawan Province Stadium | |
| Nan | Nan | Nan PAO. Stadium | |
| Phitsanulok | Phitsanulok | Phitsanulok PAO. Stadium | |
| Singburi Bangrajun | Singburi | Singburi Provincial Stadium | |
| Sukhothai U-23 | Sukhothai | Thung Thalay Luang Stadium | |
| Uttaradit | Uttaradit | Mon-mai Stadium | |

== League table ==
| Pos | Team | Pld | W | D | L | GF | GA | GD | Pts | Qualification or relegation |
|---|---|---|---|---|---|---|---|---|---|---|
| 1 | Uttaradit (C, Q) | 18 | 13 | 4 | 1 | 39 | 14 | +25 | 43 | Qualification to Group Stage round of Thai League 4 Champions League |
| 2 | Nan (Q) | 18 | 10 | 2 | 6 | 28 | 18 | +10 | 32 | Qualification to Play-off round of Thai League 4 Champions League |
| 3 | Phitsanulok | 18 | 9 | 2 | 7 | 32 | 22 | +10 | 29 (Note: Phitsanulok head-to-head record equaluate to Nakhon Mae Sot United. Phitsanulok ahead on Goal Different; Phitsanulok +10, Nakhon Mae Sot United +5) | |
| 4 | Nakhon Mae Sot United | 18 | 7 | 8 | 3 | 22 | 17 | +5 | 29 | |
| 5 | Singburi Bangrajun | 18 | 6 | 3 | 9 | 21 | 30 | −9 | 21 | |
| 6 | Nakhon Sawan (R) | 18 | 4 | 2 | 12 | 15 | 28 | −13 | 14 | Relegation to the 2019 Thailand Amateur League |
| 7 | Sukhothai U-23 (Note: They have finished lower than 6th place. So, they could not compete in T4 for one season by the rules of FA Thailand.) | 18 | 2 | 3 | 13 | 17 | 45 | −28 | 9 | Could not compete in 2019 Thai League 4 |

Updated to match(es) played on 26 August 2018. Source: Thai League 4
Rules for classification: 1) Points; 2) Head-to-head points; 3) Overall goals difference; 4) Overall goals scored; 5) Fair play points; 6) Play-off without extra time;).
(C) Champions; (Q) Qualified for the phase indicated; (R) Relegated

=== Results by match played ===
| Team ╲ Round | 1 | 2 | 3 | 4 | 5 | 6 | 7 | 8 | 9 | 10 | 11 | 12 | 13 | 14 | 15 | 16 | 17 | 18 |
|---|---|---|---|---|---|---|---|---|---|---|---|---|---|---|---|---|---|---|
| Uttaradit | D | W | W | W | W | W | D | W | D | L | D | W | W | W | W | W | W | W |
| Nan | W | L | L | W | W | L | W | D | L | W | W | D | W | L | W | W | W | L |
| Phitsanulok | L | L | L | W | L | W | W | D | L | W | W | W | W | L | L | W | D | W |
| Nakhon Mae Sot United | D | W | W | D | W | W | D | D | D | W | L | D | L | W | L | W | D | D |
| Singburi Bangrajun | L | W | L | L | D | L | W | L | W | L | W | D | W | L | L | L | W | D |
| Nakhon Sawan | W | L | W | L | D | L | L | L | W | W | L | L | L | L | L | D | L | L |
| Sukhothai U-23 | L | L | W | L | D | L | L | D | L | L | L | L | L | W | D | L | L | L |

Source: Thai League 4
W = Win; D = Draw; L = Loss

== Results 1st and 2nd match for each team ==
| Home \ Away | NMS | NSW | NAN | PNL | SBB | SUK | UDT |
|---|---|---|---|---|---|---|---|
| Nakhon Mae Sot United | | 2–1 | 1–1 | 1–0 | 2–2 | 1–0 | 1–1 |
| Nakhon Sawan | 0–0 | | 1–0 | 1–3 | 2–1 | 2–1 | 0–1 |
| Nan | 0–2 | 0–1 | | 3–2 | 3–1 | 3–0 | 0–0 |
| Phitsanulok | 2–1 | 2–1 | 0–1 | | 6–0 | 5–1 | 3–4 |
| Singburi Bangrajun | 0–1 | 2–0 | 1–2 | 1–0 | | 3–0 | 2–1 |
| Sukhothai U-23 | 1–1 | 3–0 | 1–2 | 2–3 | 0–0 | | 1–3 |
| Uttaradit | 0–0 | 2–1 | 1–0 | 0–0 | 1–0 | 5–0 | |

Updated to match(es) played on 1 July 2018. Source: Thai League 4
Legend: Blue = home team win; Yellow = draw; Red = away team win.

== Results 3rd match for each team ==
In the third leg, the winner on head-to-head result of the first and the second leg will be home team. If head-to-head result are tie, must to find the home team from head-to-head goals different. If all of head-to-head still tie, must to find the home team from penalty kickoff on the end of each second leg match (This penalty kickoff don't bring to calculate points on league table, it's only the process to find the home team on third leg).

| Home \ Away | NMS | NSW | NAN | PNL | SBB | SUK | UDT |
|---|---|---|---|---|---|---|---|
| Nakhon Mae Sot United | | 2–0 | 3–1 | 0–0 | 2–2 | 1–2 | |
| Nakhon Sawan | | | 1–2 | | | | |
| Nan | | | | 2–1 | 1–0 | 7–1 | |
| Phitsanulok | | 2–1 | | | 1–0 | 2–1 | |
| Singburi Bangrajun | | 2–1 | | | | 3–1 | |
| Sukhothai U-23 | | 0–0 | | | | | |
| Uttaradit | 4–1 | 3–2 | 1–0 | 2–0 | 6–1 | 4–2 | |

Updated to match(es) played on 26 August 2018. Source: Thai League 4
Legend: Blue = home team win; Yellow = draw; Red = away team win.

== Season statistics ==
=== Top scorers ===
As of 26 August 2018.

| Rank | Player | Club | Goals |
|---|---|---|---|
| 1 | (Ivory Coast) Diarra Aboubacar Sidick | Phitsanulok (5), Uttaradit (7) | 12 |
| 2 | (Thailand) Archawin Sungnoen | Sukhothai U-23 | 11 |
| 3 | (Thailand) Siwanan Chaipanyasit | Nan | 9 |
| 4 | (American Samoa) Diego Barrera | Phitsanulok | 7 |
| 4 | (Thailand) Anucha Phantong | Phitsanulok | 7 |
| 4 | (Thailand) Krit Phavaputanon | Uttaradit (3), Muang Loei United (4) | 7 |
| 7 | (Egypt) Radwan Mahmoud Mohamed Afify | Singburi Bangrajun | 6 |
| 7 | (Thailand) Pitsanu Ngamsa-nguan | Uttaradit | 6 |
| 9 | (Thailand) Thanawut Butwong | Nan | 5 |
| 9 | (Thailand) Somkeat Ngamprom | Phitsanulok | 5 |
| 9 | (Thailand) Noppaklao Damrongthai | Singburi Bangrajun | 5 |

=== Hat-tricks ===
| Player | For | Against | Result | Date |
|---|---|---|---|---|
| (Thailand) Anucha Phantong | Phitsanulok | Uttaradit | 3–4 | 24 February 2018 |
| (Ivory Coast) Diarra Aboubacar Sidick | Phitsanulok | Sukhothai U-23 | 5–1 | 18 March 2018 |
| (Thailand) Siwanan Chaipanyasit | Nan | Sukhothai U-23 | 7–1 | 7 July 2018 |
| (Thailand) Thanawut Butwong | Nan | Sukhothai U-23 | 7–1 | 7 July 2018 |

== Attendance ==
| Pos | Team | Total | High | Low | Average | Change |
|---|---|---|---|---|---|---|
| 1 | Uttaradit | 5,048 | 876 | 310 | 505 | −4.9% |
| 2 | Phitsanulok | 4,437 | 739 | 172 | 493 | −50.1% |
| 3 | Nakhon Mae Sot United | 3,402 | 900 | 26 | 309 | n/a |
| 4 | Nakhon Sawan | 2,010 | 550 | 200 | 287 | −3.4% |
| 5 | Nan | 2,026 | 462 | 147 | 225 | −64.0% |
| 6 | Singburi Bangrajun | 1,324 | 350 | 66 | 166 | −39.4% |
| 7 | Sukhothai U-23 | 640 | 195 | 30 | 91 | n/a |
| | League total | 18,887 | 900 | 26 | 310 | −27.6% |

Updated to games played on 26 August 2018
Source: Thai League 4

=== Attendance by home match played ===
| Team \ Match played | 1 | 2 | 3 | 4 | 5 | 6 | 7 | 8 | 9 | 10 | 11 | 12 | Total |
|---|---|---|---|---|---|---|---|---|---|---|---|---|---|
| Nakhon Mae Sot United | 900 | 560 | 491 | 497 | 239 | 168 | 114 | 26 | 57 | 200 | 150 | | 3,402 |
| Nakhon Sawan | 300 | 200 | 200 | 210 | 200 | 550 | 350 | | | | | | 2,010 |
| Nan | 300 | 462 | 151 | 180 | 147 | 186 | 150 | 213 | 237 | | | | 2,026 |
| Phitsanulok | 700 | 739 | 556 | 420 | 616 | 581 | 446 | 207 | 172 | | | | 4,437 |
| Singburi Bangrajun | 350 | 268 | 150 | 150 | 110 | 100 | 66 | 130 | | | | | 1,324 |
| Sukhothai U-23 | 195 | 90 | 48 | 67 | 120 | 90 | 30 | | | | | | 640 |
| Uttaradit | 354 | 380 | 310 | 380 | 370 | 821 | Unk.1 | Unk.2 | 876 | 630 | 496 | 431 | 5,048 |

Source: Thai League 4 Note:
Unk.1 Some error of T4 official match report 8 July 2018 (Uttaradit 4–1 Nakhon Mae Sot United).
Unk.2 Some error of T4 official match report 15 July 2018 (Uttaradit 3–2 Nakhon Sawan).

== See also ==
- 2018 Thai League
- 2018 Thai League 2
- 2018 Thai League 3
- 2018 Thai League 4
- 2018 Thailand Amateur League
- 2018 Thai FA Cup
- 2018 Thai League Cup
- 2018 Thailand Champions Cup
