= 2019 Thai League 4 Northern Region =

Thai League 4 Northern Region
- Season: 2019
- Dates: 9 February 2019 – 1 September 2019
- Champions: Uttaradit
- Relegated: Singburi Bangrajun
- T4 Champions League: Uttaradit; Wat Bot City
- Matches: 135
- Goals: 478 (3.54 per match)
- Top goalscorer: (Thailand) Kritsada Tapingyot (15 goals; Maejo United)
- Biggest home win: 9 goals difference Wat Bot City 9–0 Chiangrai United (B) (10 July 2019); Uttaradit 9–0 Chiangrai United (B) (31 July 2019)
- Biggest away win: 10 goals difference Chiangrai United (B) 1–11 Uttaradit (26 May 2019)
- Highest scoring: 12 goals Chiangrai United (B) 1–11 Uttaradit (26 May 2019)
- Longest winning run: 10 matches Uttaradit
- Longest unbeaten run: 15 matches Uttaradit
- Longest winless run: 23 matches Chiangrai United (B)
- Longest losing run: 19 matches Chiangrai United (B)
- Highest attendance: 2,120; Uttaradit 2–1 Phitsanulok (1 September 2019)
- Lowest attendance: 9 Chiangrai United (B) 3–6 Nakhon Mae Sot United (9 June 2019)
- Total attendance: 47,697
- Average attendance: 359

The 2019 Thai League 4 Northern region is a region in the regional stage of the 2019 Thai League 4. A total of 10 teams located in Northern, Western, and Upper central of Thailand will compete in the league of the Northern region.

== Teams ==
=== Number of teams by province ===
| Position | Province | Number | Teams |
|---|---|---|---|
| 1 | Chiang Mai | 2 | JL Chiangmai United (B) and Maejo United |
| 1 | Phitsanulok | 2 | Phitsanulok and Wat Bot City |
| 2 | Chiang Rai | 1 | Chiangrai United (B) |
| 2 | Nan | 1 | Nan |
| 2 | Singburi | 1 | Singburi Bangrajun |
| 2 | Sukhothai | 1 | Sukhothai (B) |
| 2 | Tak | 1 | Nakhon Mae Sot United |
| 2 | Uttaradit | 1 | Uttaradit |

=== Stadiums and locations ===
Locations of the 2019 Thai League 4 Northern region teams

| Team | Location | Stadium | Coordinates |
|---|---|---|---|
| Chiangrai United (B) | Chiangrai (Mueang) | Mae Fah Luang University Stadium^{9/2/2019–10/3/2019} | 20°03′29″N 99°53′46″E |
| Chiangrai United (B) | Chiangrai (Mueang) | Chiangrai Provincial Stadium^{21/4/2019–} | 19°54′48″N 99°51′21″E |
| JL Chiangmai United (B) | Chiangmai (Mueang) | Chiangmai Municipality Stadium | 18°48′03″N 98°59′22″E |
| Maejo United | Chiangmai (San Sai) | Maejo University Stadium | 18°53′54″N 99°00′48″E |
| Nakhon Mae Sot United | Tak (Mae Sot) | Somdet Phra Naresuan Maharat Stadium^{3/3/2019–31/3/2019} | 16°43′16″N 98°34′04″E |
| Nakhon Mae Sot United | Tak (Mae Sot) | Five Border Districts International Stadium^{28/4/2019–} | 16°44′07″N 98°33′52″E |
| Nan | Nan (Mueang) | Nan PAO. Stadium | 18°47′33″N 100°46′32″E |
| Phitsanulok | Phitsanulok (Mueang) | Phitsanulok PAO. Stadium^{17/2/2019–28/4/2019} | 16°50′47″N 100°15′51″E |
| Phitsanulok | Phitsanulok (Mueang) | Pibulsongkram Rajabhat University Stadium^{14/5/2019–} | 16°49′54″N 100°12′47″E |
| Singburi Bangrajun | Singburi (Mueang) | Singburi Provincial Stadium | 14°53′40″N 100°24′39″E |
| Sukhothai (B) | Sukhothai (Mueang) | Thalay Luang Stadium | 17°03′43″N 99°47′39″E |
| Uttaradit | Uttaradit (Mueang) | Uttaradit Provincial Stadium | 17°36′34″N 100°06′39″E |
| Wat Bot City | Phitsanulok (Mueang) | Pibulsongkram Rajabhat University Stadium | 16°49′54″N 100°12′47″E |

== League table ==
=== Standings ===
| Pos | Team | Pld | W | D | L | GF | GA | GD | Pts | Qualification or relegation |
|---|---|---|---|---|---|---|---|---|---|---|
| 1 | Uttaradit (Q) | 27 | 20 | 6 | 1 | 77 | 16 | +61 | 66 | Qualification to the Champions League stage |
| 2 | Wat Bot City (Q) | 27 | 17 | 7 | 3 | 65 | 24 | +41 | 58 | Qualification to the Champions League stage |
| 3 | Maejo United | 27 | 15 | 8 | 4 | 72 | 29 | +43 | 53 | |
| 4 | Phitsanulok | 27 | 12 | 9 | 6 | 43 | 25 | +18 | 45 | |
| 5 | Nan | 27 | 12 | 7 | 8 | 49 | 34 | +15 | 43 | |
| 6 | Nakhon Mae Sot United | 27 | 10 | 8 | 9 | 48 | 26 | +22 | 38 | |
| 7 | Singburi Bangrajun (R) | 27 | 11 | 4 | 12 | 47 | 46 | +1 | 37 | Relegation to the 2020 Thailand Amateur League |
| 8 | JL Chiangmai United (B) | 27 | 5 | 2 | 20 | 31 | 61 | −30 | 17 | Suspension in 2020 season |
| 9 | Sukhothai (B) | 27 | 3 | 3 | 21 | 24 | 83 | −59 | 12 | Suspension in 2020 season |
| 10 | Chiangrai United (B) | 27 | 2 | 2 | 23 | 22 | 134 | −112 | 8 | Suspension in 2020 season |

Source: Thai League
Rules for classification: 1) Points; 2) Head-to-head points; 3) Head-to-head goal difference; 4) Head-to-head goal scored; 5) Overall goal difference; 6) Overall goal scored; 7) Fair play points; 8) Play-off without extra time).
(Q) Qualified for the phase indicated; (R) Relegated

=== Positions by round ===
| Qualification to the Champions League stage |
| Relegation to the 2020 Thailand Amateur League |

| Team ╲ Round | 1 | 2 | 3 | 4 | 5 | 6 | 7 | 8 | 9 | 10 | 11 | 12 | 13 | 14 | 15 | 16 | 17 | 18 | 19 | 20 | 21 | 22 | 23 | 24 | 25 | 26 | 27 |
|---|---|---|---|---|---|---|---|---|---|---|---|---|---|---|---|---|---|---|---|---|---|---|---|---|---|---|---|
| Uttaradit | 6 | 6 | 4 | 4 | 1 | 1 | 1 | 1 | 1 | 1 | 1 | 1 | 1 | 1 | 1 | 1 | 1 | 1 | 1 | 1 | 1 | 1 | 1 | 1 | 1 | 1 | 1 |
| Wat Bot City | 7 | 3 | 1 | 1 | 3 | 3 | 3 | 2 | 2 | 2 | 2 | 2 | 2 | 2 | 2 | 4 | 3 | 3 | 4 | 3 | 3 | 3 | 3 | 3 | 2 | 2 | 2 |
| Maejo United | 3 | 4 | 5 | 3 | 2 | 2 | 4 | 3 | 3 | 4 | 4 | 3 | 3 | 4 | 3 | 2 | 2 | 2 | 2 | 2 | 2 | 2 | 2 | 2 | 3 | 3 | 3 |
| Phitsanulok | 1 | 1 | 2 | 2 | 4 | 4 | 2 | 4 | 4 | 3 | 3 | 4 | 4 | 3 | 4 | 3 | 4 | 4 | 3 | 4 | 4 | 4 | 4 | 4 | 4 | 4 | 4 |
| Nan | 4 | 2 | 3 | 5 | 5 | 5 | 5 | 5 | 6 | 5 | 5 | 5 | 5 | 5 | 6 | 6 | 7 | 6 | 5 | 6 | 6 | 6 | 5 | 5 | 5 | 5 | 5 |
| Nakhon Mae Sot United | 8 | 8 | 8 | 7 | 6 | 6 | 8 | 7 | 7 | 7 | 7 | 7 | 7 | 7 | 7 | 7 | 6 | 7 | 7 | 7 | 7 | 7 | 7 | 7 | 7 | 7 | 6 |
| Singburi Bangrajun | 5 | 7 | 7 | 8 | 8 | 7 | 7 | 6 | 5 | 6 | 6 | 6 | 6 | 6 | 5 | 5 | 5 | 5 | 6 | 5 | 5 | 5 | 6 | 6 | 6 | 6 | 7 |
| JL Chiangmai United (B) | 9 | 9 | 9 | 9 | 9 | 9 | 9 | 9 | 9 | 9 | 9 | 9 | 9 | 8 | 8 | 9 | 8 | 8 | 8 | 8 | 8 | 8 | 8 | 8 | 8 | 8 | 8 |
| Sukhothai (B) | 2* | 5 | 6 | 6 | 7 | 8 | 6 | 8 | 8 | 8 | 8 | 8 | 8 | 9 | 9 | 8 | 9 | 9 | 9 | 9 | 9 | 9 | 9 | 9 | 9 | 9 | 9 |
| Chiangrai United (B) | 10* | 10* | 10* | 10* | 10* | 10* | 10* | 10* | 10* | 10* | 10* | 10* | 10* | 10* | 10* | 10* | 10* | 10* | 10* | 10* | 10* | 10* | 10* | 10* | 10* | 10* | 10* |

Source: Thai League

Notes:
* The reserve of T1 and T2 teams, also known as team (B) could not qualified and relegated, so that the teams in lower or upper positions would be qualified or relegated.

=== Results by round ===
| Team ╲ Round | 1 | 2 | 3 | 4 | 5 | 6 | 7 | 8 | 9 | 10 | 11 | 12 | 13 | 14 | 15 | 16 | 17 | 18 | 19 | 20 | 21 | 22 | 23 | 24 | 25 | 26 | 27 |
|---|---|---|---|---|---|---|---|---|---|---|---|---|---|---|---|---|---|---|---|---|---|---|---|---|---|---|---|
| Uttaradit | D | D | W | W | W | W | W | W | W | W | W | W | D | W | W | L | W | D | D | D | W | W | W | W | W | W | W |
| Wat Bot City | D | W | W | W | D | W | D | W | W | L | W | W | W | D | L | L | W | D | D | W | W | W | W | W | W | W | D |
| Maejo United | W | D | D | W | W | W | L | W | L | D | W | W | W | L | W | W | D | D | W | W | D | W | W | W | L | D | D |
| Phitsanulok | W | W | D | W | D | W | W | L | L | W | W | D | W | D | D | W | D | D | W | L | D | W | L | L | W | D | L |
| Nan | D | W | D | L | W | L | W | L | D | W | W | L | L | W | D | D | L | W | W | D | D | L | W | W | W | L | W |
| Nakhon Mae Sot United | L | D | D | D | W | L | L | W | L | D | L | D | W | W | W | D | W | L | L | D | D | W | W | L | L | W | W |
| Singburi Bangrajun | D | L | D | L | L | W | D | W | W | L | L | W | D | W | W | W | L | W | L | W | W | L | L | L | L | W | L |
| JL Chiangmai United (B) | L | D | L | D | L | L | L | L | W | W | L | L | L | L | L | L | W | W | W | L | L | L | L | L | L | L | L |
| Sukhothai (B) | W | L | D | L | L | L | W | L | D | L | L | L | L | L | L | W | L | L | L | L | L | L | L | L | D | L | L |
| Chiangrai United (B) | L | L | L | L | L | L | L | L | L | L | L | L | L | L | L | L | L | L | L | D | L | L | L | W | D | L | W |

W = Won; D = Drawn; L = Lost

=== Results ===
For the Northern region, a total 27 matches per team competing in 3 legs. In the 3rd leg, the winner on head-to-head result of the 1st and the 2nd leg will be home team. If head-to-head result are tie, must to find the home team from head-to-head goals different. If all of head-to-head still tie, must to find the home team from penalty kickoff on the end of each 2nd leg match (This penalty kickoff don't bring to calculate points on league table, it's only the process to find the home team in 3rd leg).

| Home \ Away | CRU | JCU | MJU | NMU | NAN | PLK | SBJ | SKT | UTD | WBC | CRU | JCU | MJU | NMU | NAN | PLK | SBJ | SKT | UTD | WBC |
|---|---|---|---|---|---|---|---|---|---|---|---|---|---|---|---|---|---|---|---|---|
| Chiangrai United (B) | — | 1–4 | 2–8 | 3–6 | 1–3 | 0–3 | 1–6 | 1–2 | 1–11 | 1–6 | — | — | — | — | — | — | — | — | — | — |
| JL Chiangmai United (B) | 5–0 | — | 0–2 | 1–1 | 2–4 | 1–2 | 2–0 | 3–0 | 0–5 | 1–4 | 0–1 | — | — | — | — | — | — | 2–1 | — | — |
| Maejo United | 7–0 | 0–0 | — | 1–0 | 0–0 | 5–1 | 2–1 | 5–1 | 2–0 | 2–2 | 6–3 | 4–0 | — | 4–1 | 0–0 | 0–0 | 3–0 | 8–0 | — | — |
| Nakhon Mae Sot United | 5–1 | 4–2 | 1–1 | — | 1–1 | 0–0 | 1–2 | 4–0 | 0–1 | 0–1 | 6–0 | 3–1 | — | — | — | 1–1 | — | 5–0 | — | 0–1 |
| Nan | 6–0 | 2–1 | 2–4 | 1–0 | — | 1–1 | 3–0 | 0–0 | 1–2 | 1–2 | 1–1 | 2–1 | — | 1–0 | — | — | 3–0 | 6–2 | — | — |
| Phitsanulok | 5–0 | 3–0 | 0–0 | 2–2 | 2–0 | — | 1–0 | 1–0 | 1–2 | 1–1 | 6–0 | 2–1 | — | — | 0–2 | — | 1–2 | 2–1 | — | 1–2 |
| Singburi Bangrajun | 6–1 | 4–0 | 2–1 | 1–0 | 3–3 | 0–2 | — | 3–0 | 1–3 | 3–1 | 1–2 | 4–2 | — | 0–2 | — | — | — | 4–2 | — | 0–5 |
| Sukhothai (B) | 5–0 | 2–0 | 2–3 | 0–4 | 1–2 | 0–2 | 1–1 | — | 0–3 | 2–4 | 1–1 | — | — | — | — | — | — | — | — | — |
| Uttaradit | 5–0 | 4–0 | 4–1 | 0–0 | 3–0 | 1–1 | 2–2 | 3–0 | — | 0–0 | 9–0 | 2–1 | 4–1 | 0–0 | 2–1 | 2–1 | 1–0 | 6–1 | — | 1–1 |
| Wat Bot City | 9–0 | 2–0 | 1–0 | 0–1 | 2–1 | 1–1 | 1–1 | 3–0 | 0–1 | — | 2–1 | 2–1 | 2–2 | — | 3–2 | — | — | 7–0 | — | — |

Source: Thai League
Legend: Blue = home team win; Yellow = draw; Red = away team win.
For upcoming matches, an "a" indicates there is an article about the rivalry between the two participants.

== Attendances ==
=== Overall statistical table ===
| Pos | Team | Total | High | Low | Average | Change |
|---|---|---|---|---|---|---|
| 1 | Uttaradit | 11,939 | 2,120 | 10 | 663 | +31.3% |
| 2 | Phitsanulok | 9,716 | 1,559 | 253 | 648 | +31.4% |
| 3 | Wat Bot City | 5,283 | 956 | 100 | 377 | n/a^{†} |
| 4 | Maejo United | 5,622 | 550 | 125 | 351 | n/a |
| 5 | JL Chiangmai United (B) | 3,494 | 572 | 180 | 318 | n/a |
| 6 | Nakhon Mae Sot United | 4,437 | 420 | 225 | 317 | +2.6% |
| 7 | Nan | 3,699 | 813 | 130 | 264 | +17.3% |
| 8 | Sukhothai (B) | 1,535 | 380 | 80 | 154 | +69.2% |
| 9 | Singburi Bangrajun | 1,495 | 200 | 75 | 125 | −24.7% |
| 10 | Chiangrai United (B) | 477 | 102 | 9 | 53 | n/a |
| | League total | 47,697 | 2,120 | 9 | 359 | +15.8% |

Source: Thai League

=== Attendances by home match played ===
| Team \ Match played | 1 | 2 | 3 | 4 | 5 | 6 | 7 | 8 | 9 | 10 | 11 | 12 | 13 | 14 | 15 | 16 | 17 | 18 | Total |
|---|---|---|---|---|---|---|---|---|---|---|---|---|---|---|---|---|---|---|---|
| Chiangrai United (B) | 85 | 35 | 65 | 22 | 41 | 9 | 50 | 102 | 68 | | | | | | | | | | 477 |
| JL Chiangmai United (B) | 425 | 572 | 325 | 315 | 210 | 357 | 325 | 285 | 285 | 215 | 180 | | | | | | | | 3,494 |
| Maejo United | 515 | 450 | 395 | 325 | 180 | 125 | 400 | 420 | 280 | 425 | 415 | 297 | 325 | 295 | 225 | 550 | | | 5,622 |
| Nakhon Mae Sot United | 360 | 300 | 420 | 320 | 350 | 323 | 317 | 380 | 306 | 262 | 248 | 225 | 314 | 312 | | | | | 4,437 |
| Nan | 813 | 314 | 234 | 229 | 210 | 297 | 215 | 427 | 142 | 180 | 167 | 189 | 130 | 152 | | | | | 3,699 |
| Phitsanulok | 1,200 | 568 | 1,559 | 469 | 564 | 633 | 320 | 305 | 396 | 711 | 834 | 328 | 1,232 | 344 | 253 | | | | 9,716 |
| Singburi Bangrajun | 200 | 200 | 105 | 125 | Unk.1 | 100 | 100 | 200 | 100 | 75 | 100 | 100 | Unk.2 | 90 | | | | | 1,495 |
| Sukhothai (B) | 100 | 165 | 175 | 100 | 115 | 120 | 215 | 380 | 85 | 80 | | | | | | | | | 1,535 |
| Uttaradit | 512 | 459 | 396 | 468 | 338 | 421 | 562 | 602 | 10 | 789 | 745 | 508 | 478 | 739 | 449 | 1,173 | 1,170 | 2,120 | 11,939 |
| Wat Bot City | 507 | 602 | 272 | 298 | 550 | 289 | 956 | 325 | 100 | 184 | 284 | 331 | 207 | 378 | | | | | 5,283 |

Source: Thai League Note:
Unk.1 Some error of T4 official match report 18 May 2019 (Singburi Bangrajun 0–2 Phitsanulok).
Unk.2 Some error of T4 official match report 25 August 2019 (Singburi Bangrajun 4–2 JL Chiangmai United (B)).

== Season statistics ==
=== Top scorers by team ===
| Position | Teams | Name | Goals |
|---|---|---|---|
| 1 | Maejo United | (Thailand) Kritsada Tapingyot | 15 |
| 2 | Singburi Bangrajun | (Thailand) Kongphob Kamasit | 13 |
| 2 | Uttaradit | (Brazil) Giuberty Silva Neves | 13 |
| 4 | Phitsanulok | (Thailand) Jirawut Saranan | 11 |
| 4 | Wat Bot City | (Thailand) Natthawut Nueamai | 11 |
| 6 | JL Chiangmai United (B) | (Thailand) Kiadtisak Nantavichianrit | 9 |
| 6 | Nan | (Thailand) Santisak Tadthiang | 9 |
| 8 | Nakhon Mae Sot United | (Thailand) Prasit Saenkhamiue | 8 |
| 9 | Chiangrai United (B) | (Thailand) Chanchai Boonpeng | 5 |
| 9 | Sukhothai (B) | (Thailand) Watcharin Yailoet | 5 |

== See also ==
- 2019 Thai League 1
- 2019 Thai League 2
- 2019 Thai League 3
- 2019 Thai League 4
- 2019 Thailand Amateur League
- 2019 Thai FA Cup
- 2019 Thai League Cup
- 2019 Thailand Champions Cup
