= 2011 Regional League Division 2 Northern Region =

Regional League Northern Division
- Season: 2011
- Champions: Phitsanulok; 1st Title
- Matches played: 240
- Goals scored: 634 (2.64 per match)
- Biggest home win: Phitsanulok 6-0 Lampang (27 March 2011); Lamphun Warrior 6-0 Singburi (1 May 2011)
- Biggest away win: Sukhothai 0-5 Nakhon Sawan (27 March 2011)
- Highest scoring: Uthai Thani 5-3 Tak (23 April 2011); Uttaradit 4-4 Singburi; 31 July 2011); Uttaradit 5-3 Lamphun Warrior (14 August 2011) (8 goals)

2011 Regional League Division 2 Northern Region is the third season of the League competition since its establishment in 2009. It is in the third tier of the Thai football league system. The league winners and runners up will qualify for the 2011 Regional League Division 2 championship stage.

== Changes from last season ==
=== Team changes ===
==== Promoted clubs ====
Chiangmai and Chainat were promoted to the 2011 Thai Division 1 League.

==== Expansion clubs ====
Lamphun Warrior and Nan joined the newly expanded league setup.

== Stadium and locations ==
Locations of the Regional League North Teams

Team	Location	Stadium	Capacity	Ref.
Phitsanulok TSY	Phitsanulok	Phitsanulok Province Stadium	3,066	
Lamphun Warrior	Lamphun	Lamphun Provincial Administrative Organization Stadium	?	
Phichit	Phichit	Phichit Province Stadium	20,000	
Uttaradit-Morseng	Uttaradit	Mon-mai Stadium	3,245	
Nakhon Sawan	Nakhon Sawan	Nakhon Sawan Province Stadium	?	
Kamphaeng Phet	Kamphaeng Phet	Kamphaeng Phet Province Stadium	2,580	
Uthai Thani Forest	Uthai Thani	Uthai Thani Province Stadium	4,477	
Singburi	Singburi	Singburi Province Stadium	3,449	
Lampang	Lampang	Lampang Province Stadium	4,705	
Phrae United	Phrae	Phrae Provincial Administrative Organization Stadium	4,500	
Sukhothai	Sukhothai	Sukhothai Institute of Physical Education Stadium	4,500	
Phetchabun	Phetchabun	Phetchabun Institute of Physical Education Stadium	?	
Tak	Tak	Tak Province Stadium	3,171	
Chiangrai	Chiangrai	Chiangrai Provincial Administrative Organization Stadium	5,000	
Phayao	Phayao	Fakkwanwittayakom School Stadium	?	
Nan	Nan	Rajamangala University of Technology Nan Campus Stadium	?	

== League table ==
Pos	Team	Pld	W	D	L	GF	GA	GD	Pts	Qualification
1	Phitsanulok TSY (C, Q)	30	22	7	1	56	18	+38	73	Championship Pool
2	Lamphun Warrior (Q)	30	20	5	5	59	28	+31	65	Championship Pool
3	Phichit (Q)	30	18	8	4	47	27	+20	62	Championship Pool
4	Uttaradit-Morseng	30	13	9	8	56	41	+15	48	
5	Nakhon Sawan	30	13	7	10	43	36	+7	46 (Note: NSW 1–3 SBR; SBR 0–2 NSW)	
6	Singburi	30	14	4	12	46	46	0	46	
7	Uthai Thani Forest	30	10	13	7	50	39	+11	43	
8	Phrae United	30	10	12	8	28	22	+6	42	
9	Lampang	30	11	7	12	28	44	−16	40	
10	Kamphaeng Phet	30	10	8	12	40	41	−1	38	
11	Chiangrai	30	10	7	13	35	44	−9	37	
12	Phetchabun	30	9	7	14	43	52	−9	34	
13	Nan	30	7	5	18	31	46	−15	26	
14	Sukhothai	30	6	8	16	23	41	−18	26	
15	Tak	30	5	4	21	32	64	−32	19	
16	Phayao	30	3	7	20	17	45	−28	16	

Rules for classification: 1) points; 2) head-to-head points; 3) head-to-head goal difference; 4) head-to-head goals scored; 5) goal difference; 6) number of goals scored.
(C) Champions; (Q) Qualified for the phase indicated

== Results ==
Home \ Away	CHR	KPP	LMP	LWR	NSW	NAN	PHY	PCB	PCT	PSL	PHR	SBR	SKT	TAK	UTN	UTD
Chiangrai		3–2	2–1	2–2	1–0	0–0	0–1	3–1	1–2	2–4	1–0	2–1	2–0	3–1	1–1	1–2
Kamphaeng Phet	3–2		2–3	1–3	1–0	1–2	2–1	1–1	1–1	0–3	1–0	0–2	0–1	2–0	4–1	3–2
Lampang	0–0	0–1		0–1	0–2	1–0	2–1	2–1	2–2	1–2	2–1	0–0	2–0	1–1	0–0	1–0
Lamphun Warrior	3–0	0–0	1–1		2–1	2–1	3–1	1–0	2–0	0–0	1–1	6–0	2–0	4–0	2–0	0–1
Nakhon Sawan	2–0	0–0	3–0	3–1		1–0	2–1	0–0	0–0	0–1	1–1	1–3	2–1	4–1	2–2	1–4
Nan	0–1	0–0	0–1	1–2	4–1		4–2	1–2	0–1	0–1	1–1	1–3	2–4	2–0	0–3	0–1
Phayao	0–0	1–1	0–1	0–4	0–1	0–1		0–2	1–2	0–1	0–3	1–0	0–1	1–1	0–0	1–1
Phetchabun	5–2	0–3	5–0	2–3	2–3	3–2	1–1		0–2	0–1	1–0	0–0	2–1	1–3	3–3	2–1
Phichit	4–2	2–1	3–1	0–1	0–0	2–2	2–1	3–0		2–3	1–0	2–1	2–1	2–0	2–1	2–1
Phitsanulok TSY	1–0	4–3	6–0	2–0	2–0	2–0	1–0	3–0	2–2		0–0	2–1	1–0	3–1	2–2	1–2
Phrae United	1–1	0–0	1–0	1–2	2–2	1–0	1–0	1–1	0–2	0–0		0–0	2–0	1–0	3–0	2–0
Singburi	2–1	1–0	2–1	2–4	0–2	3–0	2–1	3–2	1–2	0–2	0–1		2–0	4–1	2–1	0–4
Sukhothai	2–0	1–0	1–1	0–2	0–5	1–2	0–1	1–1	1–1	2–2	0–0	1–2		0–1	1–0	1–1
Tak	1–2	2–1	0–1	1–2	0–1	3–1	1–1	2–3	0–1	0–3	1–2	2–4	1–0		2–2	1–3
Uthai Thani Forest	0–0	3–3	4–0	2–0	4–1	1–1	3–0	3–1	1–0	0–1	3–1	2–1	1–1	5–3		1–1
Uttaradit-Morseng	2–0	2–3	2–3	5–3	3–2	2–3	2–0	3–1	0–0	0–0	1–1	4–4	1–1	4–2	1–1	

Legend: Blue = home team win; Yellow = draw; Red = away team win.
