= 2017 Thai League 4 Northern Region =

Thai League 4 Northern Region
- Season: 2017
- Champions: JL Chiangmai United
- Relegated: Paknampho NSRU
- Matches: 108
- Goals: 300 (2.78 per match)
- Top goalscorer: Chatchai Narkwijit (17 Goals)
- Biggest home win: Phitsanulok 9–1 Chiangrai United B (26 March 2017); Paknampho NSRU 9–1 Chiangrai United B (23 July 2017)
- Biggest away win: Chiangrai United B 0–4 JL Chiangmai United (19 June 2017); Tak City 0–4 JL Chiangmai United (1 July 2017); Paknampho NSRU 0–4 Chiangrai City (15 July 2017)
- Highest scoring: Phitsanulok 9–1 Chiangrai United B (26 March 2017); Paknampho NSRU 9–1 Chiangrai United B (23 July 2017)
- Longest winning run: 6 matches JL Chiangmai United; Uttaradit
- Longest unbeaten run: 11 matches Nan
- Longest losing run: 6 matches Chiangrai United B
- Highest attendance: 1,500; Phitsanulok 1–3 JL Chiangmai United (16 July 2017); JL Chiangmai United 2–0 Chiangrai City (9 September 2017)
- Lowest attendance: 36; Chiangrai City 3–1 Uttaradit (20 May 2017)
- Total attendance: 45,880
- Average attendance: 428

2017 Thai League 4 Northern Region is the 9th season of the League competition since its establishment in 2009. It is in the 4th tier of the Thai football league system.

== Changes from last season ==
=== Promoted clubs ===
Promoted to the 2017 Thai League 2

- Nong Bua Pitchaya

Four club was promoted to the 2017 Thai League 3 Upper Region.

- Kamphaeng Phet
- Phrae United
- Phayao
- Lamphun Warrior

Promoted from the 2016 Thai Division 3 Tournament Northern Region

- Changphueak Chiangmai

=== Relegated clubs ===
- Phetchabun were relegated to the 2016 Thai Division 3 Tournament Northern Region.

=== Relocated clubs ===
- Nakhon Sawan and Paknampho NSRU were moved from Central Region 2016

=== Renamed clubs ===
- Changphueak Chiangmai was renamed to JL Chiangmai United

=== Reserving clubs ===
- Chiangrai United B is Chiangrai United Reserving this team which join Northern Region first time.

== Teams ==
=== Stadium and locations ===
Locations of the 2017 Thai League 4 Northern Region Teams

Team	Province	Stadium	Ref.
JL Chiangmai United	Chiang Mai	700th Anniversary Stadium Chiang Mai University Stadium; Maejo University Stadium	
Chiangrai City	Chiang Rai	Chiangrai Province Stadium	
Chiangrai United B	Chiang Rai	United Stadium of Chiang Rai	
Nan	Nan	Nan PAO. Stadium	
Nakhon Sawan	Nakhon Sawan	Nakhon Sawan Province Stadium	
Paknampho NSRU	Nakhon Sawan	Nakhon Sawan Sport School Stadium	
Phitsanulok	Phitsanulok	Phitsanulok PAO. Stadium	
Tak City	Tak	Tak PAO. Stadium	
Uttaradit	Uttaradit	Uttaradit Province Stadium (Mon-mai Stadium)	

== League table ==
Pos	Team	Pld	W	D	L	GF	GA	GD	Pts	Qualification or relegation
1	JL Chiangmai United (C, Q, P)	24	15	4	5	46	17	+29	49	Qualification to the Thai League 4 Champions League
2	Chiangrai City (Q, P)	24	14	3	7	43	31	+12	45 (Note: Chiangrai City ahead on head-to-head record; Chiangrai City 6 pts, Phitsanulok 3 pts.)	Qualification for Thai League 4 Champions League play-off
3	Phitsanulok	24	13	6	5	51	30	+21	45	
4	Uttaradit	24	13	5	6	36	26	+10	44	
5	Nan	24	11	7	6	28	20	+8	40	
6	Nakhon Sawan	24	7	4	13	29	36	−7	25	
7	Tak City	24	6	4	14	24	33	−9	22	
8	Paknampho NSRU (R)	24	4	8	12	31	45	−14	20	Relegation to the 2018 Thailand Amateur League
9	Chiangrai United B (Note: Chiangrai United B was docked 3 points due to decision of FA Thailand about rule breaking of foreign players. They have finished lower than 6th place. So, they could not compete in T4 for one season by the rules of FA Thailand.)	24	3	3	18	18	68	−50	9	Could not compete in 2018 Thai League 4

Updated to match(es) played on 20 October 2017. Source: Thai League 4
Rules for classification: 1) Points; 2) Head-to-head points; 3) Head-to-head goals difference; 4) Head-to-head goals scored; 5) Overall goals difference; 6) Overall goals scored; 7) Fair play points; 8) Play-off without extra time;).
(C) Champions; (P) Promoted; (Q) Qualified for the phase indicated; (R) Relegated

== Results 1st and 2nd match for each team ==
Home \ Away	JLCU	CRA	CRUB	NAN	NAS	PNS	PHT	UTT	TAK
JL Chiangmai United		2–1	3–1	1–0	2–0	1–1	0–2	0–1	0–2
Chiangrai City	0–3		3–1	1–1	2–1	2–1	2–1	2–0	2–2
Chiangrai United B	0–4	1–2		1–2	3–1	1–1	0–1	0–2	2–1
Nan	0–0	1–2	3–0		1–0	1–0	1–1	2–1	1–0
Nakhon Sawan	1–1	1–2	1–0	1–2		1–0	4–0	1–1	1–0
Paknampho NSRU	1–3	1–0	3–1	0–0	2–3		0–3	1–3	2–0
Phitsanulok	0–0	2–1	9–1	1–1	3–2	3–3		2–1	3–2
Uttaradit	2–0	2–1	5–2	3–1	4–3	1–1	0–1		1–0
Tak City	0–4	2–0	5–0	0–1	1–0	1–1	0–1	0–0	

Updated to match(es) played on 9 July 2017. Source: Thai League 4
Legend: Blue = home team win; Yellow = draw; Red = away team win.

== Results 3rd match for each team ==
In the third leg, the winner on head-to-head result of the first and the second leg will be home team. If head-to-head result are tie, must to find the home team from head-to-head goals different. If all of head-to-head still tie, must to find the home team from penalty kickoff on the end of each second leg match (This penalty kickoff don't bring to calculate points on league table, it's only the process to find the home team on third leg).

Home \ Away	JLCU	CRA	CRUB	NAN	NAS	PNS	PHT	UTT	TAK
JL Chiangmai United		2–0	4–0	2–0	3–2	5–0			2–0
Chiangrai City			4–1	1–0	2–0		4–3	2–2	
Chiangrai United B					0–0				
Nan			2–0		3–0	1–1	2–2		1–2
Nakhon Sawan						2–1	0–0		3–1
Paknampho NSRU		0–4	9–1						1–1
Phitsanulok	1–3		0–2			5–1		4–0	3–0
Uttaradit	2–1		0–0	0–1	2–1	2–0			1–0
Tak City		1–3	3–0						

Updated to match(es) played on 9 September 2017. Source: Thai League 4
Legend: Blue = home team win; Yellow = draw; Red = away team win.

== Season statistics ==
=== Top scorers ===
As of 9 September 2017.

Rank	Player	Club	Goals
1	(Thailand) Chatchai Narkwijit	JL Chiangmai United	17
2	(Ivory Coast) Diarra Aboubacar Sidick	Phitsanulok	15
3	(Thailand) Authen Lekrat	Nakhon Sawan	11
4	(Thailand) Chotipat Poomkeaw	Chiangrai United B (2), Chiangrai City (6)	8
4	(Cameroon) Bayano Sobze Henai	Phitsanulok	8
4	(Thailand) Chayanon Khamkan	Chiangrai City	8
7	(Thailand) Krisada Thaphingyod	JL Chiangmai United (3), Paknampho NSRU (4)	7
7	(South Korea) Noh Hyeong-cheol	Uttaradit	7
7	(Thailand) Supakorn Naknoi	Phitsanulok	7
10	(Ivory Coast) Arboubacar Sanogo Junior	Uttaradit	6
10	(Thailand) Nantawat Tansopa	Chiangrai City	6
10	(Brazil) Maryson Jone dos Santos	Chiangrai City	6

== Attendance ==
Pos	Team	Total	High	Low	Average	Change
1	Phitsanulok	12,831	1,500	554	987	n/a
2	Nan	8,131	828	400	625	n/a
3	Uttaradit	7,436	850	300	531	n/a
4	JL Chiangmai United	5,525	1,500	168	425	n/a
5	Nakhon Sawan	3,272	500	120	297	n/a
6	Tak City	2,937	787	100	293	n/a
7	Paknampho NSRU	2,569	430	115	233	n/a
8	Chiangrai City	1,477	430	36	123	n/a
9	Chiangrai United B	1,072	179	52	82	n/a
	League total	45,880	1,500	36	428	n/a

Updated to games played on 9 September 2017
Source: Thai League 4

== See also ==
- 2017 Thai League
- 2017 Thai League 2
- 2017 Thai League 3
- 2017 Thai League 4
- 2017 Thailand Amateur League
- 2017 Thai FA Cup
- 2017 Thai League Cup
- 2017 Thailand Champions Cup
