= 2017 Thai League Cup =

Toyota League Cup

Tournament details
- Country: Thailand
- Dates: 1 March 2017 – 22 November 2017
- Teams: 71

Final positions
- Champions: SCG Muangthong United (2nd title)
- Runners-up: Chiangrai United

Tournament statistics
- Matches played: 70
- Goals scored: 192 (2.74 per match)
- Top goal scorer(s): Teerasil Dangda (5 goals)

Awards
- Best player: Teerasil Dangda

The 2017 Thai League Cup is the 8th season in the second era of a Thailand's knockout football competition. All games are played as a single match. It was sponsored by Toyota, and known as the Toyota League Cup (Thai: โตโยต้า ลีกคัพ) for sponsorship purposes. 71 clubs were accepted into the tournament, and it began with the first qualification round on 1 March 2017, and concluded with the final on 22 November 2017. The tournament has been readmitted back into Thai football after a 10-year absence. The prize money for this prestigious award is said to be around 5 million baht and the runners-up will be netting 1 million baht.

The prize money is not the only benefit of this cup, the team winning the fair play spot will get a Hilux Vigo. The MVP of the competition will get a Toyota Camry Hybrid Car. The winner would have qualified for the 2017 Mekong Club Championship final.

This is the first edition of the competition and the qualifying round will be played in regions featuring clubs from the Thai League 3 and Thai League 4.

== Calendar ==
| Round | Date | Matches | Clubs | New entries this round |
|---|---|---|---|---|
| First qualification round | 1 March 2017 | 19 | 25 + 13 → 19 | 13 2017 Thai League 3; 25 2017 Thai League 4 |
| Second qualification round | 15 March 2017 | 10 | 19 + 1 → 10 | 1 2017 Thai League 3 |
| Qualification play-off round | 22 and 23 April 2017 | 10 | 10 + 18 → 14 | 18 2017 Thai League 2 |
| First round | 26 July 2017 | 16 | 14 + 18 → 16 | 18 2017 Thai League |
| Second round | 1 October 2017 | 8 | 16 → 8 | |
| Quarter-finals | 11 October 2017 | 4 | 8 → 4 | |
| Semi-finals | 4 November 2017 | 2 | 4 → 2 | |
| Final | 22 November 2017 | 1 | 2 → Champions | |
| Total | | | | 71 clubs |

== Results ==
=== First qualification round ===
There were fourteen clubs from 2017 Thai League 3 and twenty-five clubs from 2017 Thai League 4 have signed to qualifying in 2017 Thai League cup. Qualification round had drawn on 22 February 2017 by FA Thailand.

Upper region
The qualifying round will be played in regions featuring clubs from the 2017 Thai League 4 Northern Region, 2017 Thai League 4 North Eastern Region, some of 2017 Thai League 4 Bangkok Metropolitan Region, and 2017 Thai League 3 Upper Region.

| 1 March 2017 | Muang Loei United (T4) | 2 – 0 | Uttaradit (T4) | Loei |
| 15:30 (UTC+7) | Mekmongkol Pithak 68'; Jetsada Kanha 85' | Report | | Stadium: Wang Saphung District Stadium; Attendance: 424; Referee: Tanachkrit Buachan |

| 1 March 2017 | Kamphaengphet (T3) | 3 – 2 (a.e.t.) | Phitsanulok (T4) | Kamphaengphet |
| 16:00 (UTC+7) | Vinicius Silva 39', 66'; Thanadol Taisaeng 114' | Report | Weerawut Khoonto 26'; Komsan Sueajui 86' | Stadium: Cha Kung Rao Stadium; Attendance: 1,100; Referee: Phanumart Pansamo |

| 1 March 2017 | Chiangrai City (T4) | 1 – 2 | Surin City (T4) | Chiang Rai |
| 16:00 (UTC+7) | Alaan Bruno De Souza E Santos 21' | Report | Chokanan Chueasaiduang 20'; Nitikorn Sirichu 42' | Stadium: Chiangrai Province Stadium; Attendance: 60; Referee: Suwat Wannakhan |

| 1 March 2017 | Nakhon Sawan (T4) | 1 – 4 | Kopoon Warrior (T4) | Nakhon Sawan |
| 16:00 (UTC+7) | Kiattikamol Tittipana 14' (pen.) | Report | Prayad Boonya 5', 23'; Chatchanan Huayhongtong 40'; Niran Janhom 45+1' | Stadium: Nakhon Sawan Province Stadium; Attendance: 100; Referee: Peerasan Krataithong |

| 1 March 2017 | JL Chiangmai United (T4) | 1 – 1 (a.e.t.) (4 – 5 p) | BCC (T4) | Chiang Mai |
| 18:00 (UTC+7) | Somlak Rassamee 41' | Report | Adama Diomandé 70' | Stadium: 700th Anniversary Stadium; Attendance: 474; Referee: Sarayut Jak-ngoen |
| | Penalties |
| | Chatchai Nakvijit (penalty scored); Phichet HawKongkaew (penalty scored); Sudnathee Na Chiangmai (penalty scored); Monthon chueasrila (penalty missed); Channarong Piralai (penalty scored) | | (penalty scored) Ekatit Somjit; (penalty scored) Park Jae-hyeong; (penalty scored) Lassen Marcus Lykkeaa Danker; (penalty scored) Pong-anan Jaitha; (penalty scored) Utecht Timo Uwe |

| 1 March 2017 | Ayutthaya United (T3) | 4 – 1 | Khonkaen (T3) | Ayutthaya |
| 18:00 (UTC+7) | Metee Pungpoh 39'; Kendall Jagdeosingh 50', 80', 88' | Report | Thotsaphon Yotchan 20' | Stadium: Ayutthaya Provincial Stadium; Attendance: 1,094; Referee: Kraiwut Klinpoon |

| 1 March 2017 | Kalasin (T3) | 5 – 0 | Singburi Bangrajun (T3) | Kalasin |
| 18:00 (UTC+7) | Kittikoon Pawong 1'; Roberto Hinkra 7'; Martin Muwanga 65'; Prawes Horcharoen 89'; Pirat Ritthisak 90+1' | Report | | Stadium: Kalasin Town municipality Stadium; Attendance: 318; Referee: Phannakorn Sarikakul |

| 1 March 2017 | Tak City (T4) | 5 – 3 | Phayao (T3) | Tak |
| 18:00 (UTC+7) | Surapong Thongbua 29', 59'; Jakkapan Sriwichai 54', 74'; Somchai Nirankun 57' | Report | Nimit Khob-ngern 7'; Anusorn Kiawcha-um 45+1', 90+3' | Stadium: Tak PAO. Stadium; Attendance: 275; Referee: Ekkachai Juiwong |

| 1 March 2017 | Lamphun Warrior (T3) | 1 – 0 (a.e.t.) | Nan (T4) | Lamphun |
| 19:00 (UTC+7) | Apichai Gu-or 119' | Report | | Stadium: Mae Guang Stadium; Attendance: 973; Referee: Phitsanu Karaket |

Lower region
The qualifying round will be played in regions featuring clubs from the some of 2017 Thai League 4 Bangkok Metropolitan Region, 2017 Thai League 4 Eastern Region, 2017 Thai League 4 Western Region, 2017 Thai League 4 Southern Region, some of 2017 Thai League 3 Upper Region, and 2017 Thai League 3 Lower Region.

| 1 March 2017 | Chachoengsao (T3) | 0 – 1 | Yala United (T4) | Chachoengsao |
| 15:30 (UTC+7) | | Report | Chana Sonwiset 52' | Stadium: Chachoengsao Town municipality Stadium; Attendance: 450; Referee: Rofig Nimcharoen |

| 1 March 2017 | Kabin United (T4) | 1 – 1 (a.e.t.) (4 – 5 p) | Samut Prakan (T4) | Prachinburi |
| 15:30 (UTC+7) | Somchai Deeprawat 45+2' | Report | Owusu Hayford 11' (pen.) | Stadium: Nom Klao Maharaj Stadium; Attendance: 430; Referee: Samruam Lamai |
| | Penalties |
| | Arom Sarakham (penalty scored); Natthapol Khumduang (penalty scored); Sirisak Yenjai (penalty scored); Pipat Niwong (penalty scored); Chaiwat Taewkrathok (penalty missed) | | (penalty scored) Owusu Hayford; (penalty scored) Wathanawiphu Bumrungnanithichom; (penalty scored) Sitthisak Sriwisorn; (penalty scored) Metee Pornsri; (penalty scored) Weerayut Jamcharoen |

| 1 March 2017 | Pattani (T4) | 1 – 0 | Nonthaburi (T4) | Pattani |
| 15:30 (UTC+7) | Ibrahim Dicko 25' | Report | | Stadium: Rainbow Stadium; Attendance: 689; Referee: Wichai Pannil |

| 1 March 2017 | IPE Samut Sakhon United (T4) | 1 – 1 (a.e.t.) (3 – 4 p) | Marines Eureka (T4) | Samut Sakhon |
| 16:00 (UTC+7) | Kowit Noiyam 42' | Report | Sandjo Jislin 11' | Stadium: IPE Samut Sakhon Stadium; Attendance: 250; Referee: Sirasak Kundiloksirodom |
| | Penalties |
| | Kowit Noiyam (penalty scored); Sajja Kulnara (penalty scored); Omar Fernández (penalty scored); Pongphan Taweesapsombat (penalty missed); Yutthapan Pomthong (penalty missed) | | (penalty scored) Nares Som-ngam; (penalty scored) Kirati Kaewnongdang; (penalty scored) Sandjo Jislin; (penalty scored) Lionel Frank |

| 1 March 2017 | Banbueng (T3) | 3 – 2 | Phattalung (T4) | Chonburi |
| 16:00 (UTC+7) | Teerawut Chulok 52'; Jatuporn Saiburi 59'; Nattapol Srisamut 82' | Report | Dech-anan Daengmanee 35'; Surachai Kaewrod 56' | Stadium: Banbueng municipality Stadium; Attendance: 300; Referee: Jirayut Kasiphol |

| 1 March 2017 | Ranong United (T3) | 1 – 2 | Samut Prakan United (T4) | Ranong |
| 16:30 (UTC+7) | Yaseen Harnjit 17' | Report | Supawit Romphopakdee 6'; Tewa Promma 72' | Stadium: Ranong Province Stadium; Attendance: 410; Referee: Tossapornsilp Sitthisema |

| 1 March 2017 | Trang (T3) | 2 – 0 | Sakaeo (T3) | Trang |
| 18:00 (UTC+7) | Víctor Moraes Marques dos Santos 42'; Douglas Lopes Carneiro 89' | Report | | Stadium: Trang City municipality Stadium; Attendance: 447; Referee: Manop Lhempan |

| 1 March 2017 | Pluakdaeng Rayong United (T4) | 1 – 0 | Satun United (T4) | Rayong |
| 18:00 (UTC+7) | Kamlas Khampan 28' | Report | | Stadium: Rayong Province Central Stadium; Attendance: 150; Referee: Phadungkiat Piangdee |

| 1 March 2017 | Royal Thai Fleet (T4) | 0 – 0 (a.e.t.) (2 – 4 p) | BTU United (T4) | Chonburi |
| 18:00 (UTC+7) | | Report | | Stadium: Sattahip Navy Stadium; Attendance: 470; Referee: Winai Charoenphong |
| | Penalties |
| | Nopparat Intra (penalty scored); Worakarn Kawila (penalty scored); Anuwat Hongsa (penalty missed); Wuttikrai Umprakhon (penalty missed) | | (penalty scored) Natthawut Namthip; (penalty scored) Sorrathan Kawkrathok; (penalty scored) Dechawat Sinpru; (penalty missed) Koffi Kouassi Bernard; (penalty scored) Olveira Silva Diego |

| 1 March 2017 | Pattaya (T4) | 3 – 7 | Krung Thonburi (T3) | Chonburi |
| 19:00 (UTC+7) | Wongsakorn Wongpakdee 14'; Lim Keun-young 28'; Dawda Dibba 59' | Report | Soma Otani 10'; Chanatip Watcharathanakul 19'; Theerayud Suecharoen 55'; Tatsuya Fujioka 62'; Chaiyaphat Rattanathanangpong 64', 81', 86' (pen.) | Stadium: Nong Prue 1 Stadium; Attendance: 150; Referee: Kritsada Luangyos |

=== Second qualification round ===
The second qualifying round will be featured by nineteen clubs which were the winners of first qualification round and Phrae United, a club from 2017 Thai League 3.

Upper region
The qualifying round will be played in regions featuring clubs from the 2017 Thai League 4 Northern Region, 2017 Thai League 4 North Eastern Region, some of 2017 Thai League 4 Bangkok Metropolitan Region, and 2017 Thai League 3 Upper Region.

| 15 March 2017 | Kamphaengphet (T3) | 1 – 0 | Muang Loei United (T4) | Kamphaengphet |
| 16:00 (UTC+7) | Vinicius Silva 88' | Report | | Stadium: Cha Kung Rao Stadium; Attendance: 310; Referee: Ketdamrong Khemthong |

| 15 March 2017 | Surin City (T4) | 0 – 2 | Ayutthaya United (T3) | Surin |
| 18:00 (UTC+7) | | Report | Amorndej Kittipornpracha 63'; Singkhon Mangkud 82' | Stadium: Sri Narong Stadium; Attendance: 434; Referee: Thanawit Chareerak |

| 15 March 2017 | Kalasin (T3) | 3 – 2 (a.e.t.) | Kopoon Warrior (T4) | Kalasin |
| 18:00 (UTC+7) | Roberto Hinkra 14'; Watcharapong Buasri 44', 120' | Report | Thanwa Pengchan 53'; Niran Janhom 72' | Stadium: Kalasin Town municipality Stadium; Attendance: 300; Referee: Tanachkrit Buachan |

| 15 March 2017 | Tak City (T4) | 0 – 1 | Phrae United (T3) | Tak |
| 18:00 (UTC+7) | | Report | Jaruwat Narmmool 26' | Stadium: Tak PAO. Stadium; Attendance: 369; Referee: Thastarawut Khanthawichai |

| 15 March 2017 | Lamphun Warrior (T3) | 1 – 0 | BCC (T4) | Lamphun |
| 19:00 (UTC+7) | Ekachai Pitsanu 82' | Report | | Stadium: Mae Guang Stadium; Attendance: 742; Referee: Peerasan Krataithong |

Lower region
The qualifying round will be played in regions featuring clubs from the some of 2017 Thai League 4 Bangkok Metropolitan Region, 2017 Thai League 4 Eastern Region, 2017 Thai League 4 Western Region, 2017 Thai League 4 Southern Region, some of 2017 Thai League 3 Upper Region, and 2017 Thai League 3 Lower Region.

| 15 March 2017 | Krung Thonburi (T3) | 0 – 1 | Samut Prakan United (T4) | Nakhon Pathom |
| 15:30 (UTC+7) | | Report | Supawit Romphopakdee 63' | Stadium: Mahidol University Salaya Campus Stadium; Attendance: 148; Referee: Montree Suripol |

| 15 March 2017 | Yala United (T4) | 2 – 1 | Samut Prakan (T4) | Yala |
| 15:30 (UTC+7) | Akarapol Suwan 19'; Isit Odulo 25' | Report | Hamirul Je-asae 40' | Stadium: Yala City municipality Stadium; Attendance: 360; Referee: Paisan Benkem-arlee |

| 15 March 2017 | Marines Eureka (T4) | 2 – 2 (a.e.t.) (5 – 3 p) | Pattani (T4) | Rayong |
| 15:30 (UTC+7) | Lionel Frank 26'; Chiyut Baotumma 41' | Report | Ismael Wawaeni 10'; Abdulloh Kuno 44' | Stadium: Klaeng District Stadium; Attendance: 146; Referee: Sakda Jitsupaworakul |
| | Penalties |
| | Nares Som-ngam (penalty scored); Nattakan Kaewkong (penalty scored); Kirati Kaewnongdang (penalty scored); Lionel Frank (penalty scored); Boahen Clement (penalty scored) | | (penalty missed) Malekree Deramae; (penalty scored) Ismael Wawaeni; (penalty scored) Ibrahim Dicko; (penalty scored) Souleymane Coulibaly |

| 15 March 2017 | Trang (T3) | 2 – 1 | Pluakdaeng Rayong United (T4) | Trang |
| 18:00 (UTC+7) | Douglas Lopes Carneiro 51'; Víctor Moraes Marques dos Santos 82' | Report | Diogo Figueira 55' | Stadium: Trang City municipality Stadium; Attendance: 720; Referee: Sanya Sathitdamrongkul |

| 15 March 2017 | BTU United (T4) | 2 – 1 | Banbueng (T3) | Bangkok |
| 18:00 (UTC+7) | Heritiana Thierry Ratsimbazafy 43' (pen.); Olveira Silva Diego 47' | Report | Teerawut Chulok 33' | Stadium: Bangkok-Thonburi University Stadium; Attendance: 325; Referee: Suthep Obchoei |

=== Qualification play-off round ===
The qualifying play-off round will be featured by six clubs which were the winners of second qualification round and fourteen clubs from 2017 Thai League 2. Qualification play-off round had drawn on 4 April 2017 by FA Thailand. Angthong, Songkhla United, Trat and Nakhon Pathom United withdrew. Kalasin, Samut Prakan United, Kamphaengphet and Ayutthaya United was drawn to qualify to First round.

| 22 April 2017 | Lamphun Warrior (T3) | 2 – 1 | Samut Songkhram (T2) | Lamphun |
| 18:00 (UTC+7) | Apichai Gu-or 44'; Praphas Rattanadee 74' (pen.) | Report | Premwut Wongdee 87' | Stadium: Mae Guang Stadium; Attendance: 1,350; Referee: Therdsak Thongklam |

| 22 April 2017 | Prachuap (T2) | 1 – 0 | Krabi (T2) | Prachuap Khiri Khan |
| 18:00 (UTC+7) | Apirat Heemkhao 40' | Report | | Stadium: Sam Ao Stadium; Attendance: 890; Referee: Anusorn Nookaew |

| 22 April 2017 | Air Force Central (T2) | 2 – 1 | Kasetsart (T2) | Pathum Thani |
| 18:00 (UTC+7) | Valdo 75'; Kazumichi Takagi 90+3' | Report | Huỳnh Kesley Alves 32' | Stadium: Thupatemi Stadium; Attendance: 2,251; Referee: Peerathat Kittikanmetee |

| 22 April 2017 | PTT Rayong (T2) | 1 – 0 | BBCU (T2) | Rayong |
| 18:00 (UTC+7) | Goshi Okubo 88' (pen.) | Report | | Stadium: PTT Stadium; Attendance: 1,373; Referee: Anuphong Duangsri |

| 22 April 2017 | BTU United (T4) | 1 – 2 | Army United (T2) | Bangkok |
| 18:00 (UTC+7) | Natthawut Namthip 70' | Report | Melvin de Leeuw 57'; Marcos Vinícius 61' | Stadium: Bangkokthonburi University Stadium; Attendance: 645; Referee: Thanakorn Yooraprasit |

| 23 April 2017 | Yala United (T4) | 0 – 2 | Chiangmai (T2) | Yala |
| 15:30 (UTC+7) | | Report | Hristijan Kirovski 58'; Apiwat Pengprakone 90' | Stadium: Jaru Stadium; Referee: Sombat Suwannarat |

| 23 April 2017 | Marines Eureka (T4) | 0 – 1 | Rayong (T2) | Rayong |
| 15:30 (UTC+7) | | Report | Sirisak Fufung 1' | Stadium: Klaeng Municipality Stadium; Attendance: 320; Referee: Kittiphong Choolert |

| 23 April 2017 | Trang (T3) | 1 – 0 | Lampang (T2) | Trang |
| 18:00 (UTC+7) | Gil Neves 85' | Report | | Stadium: Trang City municipality Stadium; Attendance: 500; Referee: Jarae Khuncharoen |

| 23 April 2017 | Bangkok (T2) | 2 – 3 (a.e.t.) | Nongbua Pitchaya (T2) | Bangkok |
| 18:00 (UTC+7) | Nonthawat Klinjumpasri 40'; Anon San-Mhard 72' | Report | Ramsés Bustos 59'; Nelison Teres 78'; Banluesak Yodyingyong 112' | Stadium: Chalerm Phrakiat Bang Mod Stadium; Attendance: 475; Referee: Wittaya Saraket |

| 23 April 2017 | Phrae United (T3) | 0 – 0 (a.e.t.) (4 – 5 p) | Chainat Hornbill (T2) | Phrae |
| 18:00 (UTC+7) | | Report | | Stadium: Thunghong Subdistrict municipality Stadium; Attendance: 616; Referee: Veerapol Laosuphan |
| | Penalties |
| | Jaruwat Nammul (penalty missed); Pornphong Pornjaemsai (penalty scored); Somchai Singmanee (penalty scored); Ardam Arsaryut (penalty scored); Parin Prathummet (penalty scored); Piyanat Popha (penalty missed) | | (penalty scored) Florent Sinama Pongolle; (penalty scored) Diego Emilio Silva; (penalty scored) Javlon Guseynov; (penalty scored) Jeera Jarernsuk; (penalty missed) Sarayuth Chaikamdee; (penalty scored) Chatchai Koompraya |

=== First round ===
The first round will be featured by ten clubs which were the winners of the qualification play-off round, 4 clubs which were the winners of the second qualification round, and eighteen clubs from 2017 Thai League. First round had drawn on 27 June 2017 by FA Thailand.

| 26 July 2017 | Kamphaengphet (T3) | 0 – 1 | Sukhothai (T1) | Kamphaengphet |
| 15:30 (UTC+7) | | Report | Lursan Thiamrat 20' | Stadium: Cha Kung Rao Stadium; Attendance: 480; Referee: Ketdamrong Khemthong |

| 26 July 2017 | Samut Prakan United (T4) | 0 – 4 | Pattaya United (T1) | Samut Prakan |
| 15:30 (UTC+7) | | Report | Siripong Srinaprom 15' (o.g.); Lee Won-young 19'; Aleksandar Jevtić 51'; Nopparat Sakul-oad 56' | Stadium: Lam Fah Pha Subdistrict municipality Stadium; Attendance: 110; Referee: Veerapol Laosuphan |

| 26 July 2017 | Nongbua Pitchaya (T2) | 1 – 0 | Nakhon Ratchasima Mazda (T1) | Nongbua Lamphu |
| 18:00 (UTC+7) | Andrey Coutinho 35' | Report | | Stadium: Nongbua Lamphu Provincial Stadium; Attendance: 1,836; Referee: Natee Choosuwan |

| 26 July 2017 | PTT Rayong (T2) | 4 – 0 | Super Power Samut Prakan (T1) | Rayong |
| 18:00 (UTC+7) | Goshi Okubo 29' (pen.); Thanakorn Niyomwan 36', 76'; Woo Geun-jeong 53' | Report | | Stadium: PTT Stadium; Attendance: 859; Referee: Dusut Aiemsakul |

| 26 July 2017 | Trang (T3) | 1 – 3 | Chiangrai United (T1) | Trang |
| 18:00 (UTC+7) | Adisak Khotchawech 46' | Report | Felipe Azevedo 7'; Piyaphon Phanichakul 35'; Sivakorn Tiatrakul 68' | Stadium: Trang City municipality Stadium; Attendance: 5,000; Referee: Wisawet Sangnakhon |

| 26 July 2017 | Kalasin (T3) | 0 – 2 (awd.) | BEC Tero Sasana (T1) | Kalasin |
| 18:00 (UTC+7) | | Report | | Stadium: Kalasin Town municipality Stadium; Referee: Songkran Bunmeekiat |

| 26 July 2017 | Army United (T2) | 0 – 3 | Bangkok United (T1) | Bangkok |
| 18:00 (UTC+7) | | Report | Yohan Tavares 23'; Chinedu Ede 34'; Jaycee John 63' | Stadium: Thai Army Sports Stadium; Attendance: 741; Referee: Warintorn Sasadee |

| 26 July 2017 | Air Force Central (T2) | 2 – 0 (a.e.t.) | Thai Honda Ladkrabang (T1) | Pathum Thani |
| 18:00 (UTC+7) | Tana Sripandorn 97' (pen.); Yodsak Chaowana 118' | Report | | Stadium: Thupatemee Stadium; Attendance: 1,456; Referee: Sivakorn Pu-udom |

| 26 July 2017 | Prachuap (T2) | 2 – 1 (a.e.t.) | Suphanburi (T1) | Prachuap Khiri Khan |
| 18:00 (UTC+7) | Nascimento Dos Santos 116'; Chanintorn Pohirun 120' | Report | Rangsan Viwatchaichok 120+1' | Stadium: Sam Ao Stadium; Attendance: 810; Referee: Arkom Charoensook |

| 26 July 2017 | Ayutthaya United (T3) | 1 – 2 (a.e.t.) | Port (T1) | Ayutthaya |
| 18:30 (UTC+7) | Kendall Jagdeosingh 15' | Report | Sergio Suárez 90+2', 116' | Stadium: Ayutthaya Provincial Stadium; Attendance: 1,669; Referee: Chaiyaporn Yongsaeng |

| 26 July 2017 | SCG Muangthong United (T1) | 5 – 2 | Bangkok Glass (T1) | Nonthaburi |
| 19:00 (UTC+7) | Teerasil Dangda 28'; Heberty 37', 90+4'; Piyachanok Darit 52' (o.g.); Leandro Assumpção 87' | Report | Surachat Sareepim 33'; Jhasmani Campos 45+2' | Stadium: SCG Stadium; Attendance: 5,016; Referee: Mongkolchai Pechsri |

| 26 July 2017 | Lamphun Warrior (T3) | 0 – 4 | Ratchaburi Mitr Phol (T1) | Lamphun |
| 19:00 (UTC+7) | | Report | Montree Promsawat 28', 56', 90+2' (pen.); Apiwat Ngaolamhin 60' | Stadium: Mae Guang Stadium; Attendance: 982; Referee: Prapot Dissomsri |

| 26 July 2017 | Chiangmai (T2) | 2 – 2 (a.e.t.) (2 – 4 p) | Chonburi (T1) | Chiangmai |
| 19:00 (UTC+7) | Apiwat Pengprakone 76'; Peerawis Ritsriboon 84' | Report | Thiago Cunha 15', 90+3' | Stadium: Chiangmai Municipality Stadium; Attendance: 3,373; Referee: Chairoek Ngamsom |
| | Penalties |
| | Wellington Bruno (penalty missed); Apiwat Pengprakone (penalty scored); Saharat Pongsuwan (penalty missed); Peerawis Ritsriboon (penalty scored) | | (penalty scored) Renan Marques; (penalty scored) Kroekrit Thaweekarn; (penalty scored) Fodé Diakité; (penalty scored) Nurul Sriyankem |

| 26 July 2017 | Rayong (T2) | 2 – 1 | Navy (T1) | Rayong |
| 19:00 (UTC+7) | Harrison 66'; Sirisak Fufung 82' | Report | Pisansin Za-in 3' | Stadium: Rayong Provincial Stadium; Attendance: 1,280; Referee: Anusorn Nookaew |

| 26 July 2017 | Chainat Hornbill (T2) | 1 – 2 | Buriram United (T1) | Chainat |
| 19:00 (UTC+7) | Chatchai Koompraya 8' | Report | Rafael Bastos 25'; Jajá Coelho 86' | Stadium: Khao Plong Stadium; Attendance: 2,760; Referee: Noppadech Muang-ngam |

| 26 July 2017 | Ubon UMT United (T1) | 3 – 0 | Sisaket (T1) | Ubon Ratchathani |
| 21:00 (UTC+7) | Kansit Premthanakul 31'; Thaweekoon Thong-on 58'; Bajram Nebihi 73' | Report | | Stadium: UMT Stadium; Attendance: 1,241; Referee: Pummarin Khamruen |

=== Second round ===
The second round will be featured by sixteen clubs which were the winners of the first round, including eleven clubs from T1 and five clubs from T2. Second round had drawn on 9 August 2017 by FA Thailand.

| 1 October 2017 | Nongbua Pitchaya (T2) | 0 – 0 (a.e.t.) (2 – 3 p) | Ubon UMT United (T1) | Nongbua Lamphu |
| 18:00 (UTC+7) | | Report | | Stadium: Nongbua Lamphu Provincial Stadium; Attendance: 2,008; Referee: Wittaya Saraket |
| | Penalties |
| | Amnart Pamornprasert (penalty scored); Jardel Capistrano (penalty scored); Sarawut Sintupun (penalty missed); Wittawin Clowuttiwat (penalty missed); Issarapong Lilakorn (penalty missed) | | (penalty scored) Carlão; (penalty missed) Thiago Ferreira dos Santos; (penalty scored) Bajram Nebihi; (penalty scored) Kitphom Bunsan |

| 1 October 2017 | Air Force Central (T2) | 2 – 1 (a.e.t.) | Port (T1) | Pathum Thani |
| 18:00 (UTC+7) | Yodsak Chaowana 90+3'; Kayne Vincent 109' | Report | Sergio Suárez 56' | Stadium: Thupatemi Stadium; Attendance: 3,897; Referee: Torpong Somsing |

| 1 October 2017 | PTT Rayong (T2) | 1 – 2 | Ratchaburi Mitr Phol (T1) | Rayong |
| 18:00 (UTC+7) | Thanakorn Niyomwan 12' | Report | Joël Sami 27'; Marcel Essombé 90+3' | Stadium: PTT Stadium; Attendance: 1,086; Referee: Wisawet Sungnakhon |

| 1 October 2017 | Prachuap (T2) | 1 – 1 (a.e.t.) (3 – 4 p) | BEC Tero Sasana (T1) | Prachuap Khiri Khan |
| 18:00 (UTC+7) | Willen 72' | Report | Michaël N'dri 50' | Stadium: Sam Ao Stadium; Attendance: 1,461; Referee: Mongkolchai Pechsri |
| | Penalties |
| | Willen (penalty scored); Chanintorn Pohirun (penalty scored); Sompob Nilwong (penalty scored); Yusei Ogasawara (penalty missed); Laércio (penalty missed) | | (penalty scored) Jaka Ihbeisheh; (penalty missed) Datsakorn Thonglao; (penalty scored) Kalifa Cissé; (penalty scored) Sittichok Tussanai; (penalty scored) Michaël N'dri |

| 1 October 2017 | Chonburi (T1) | 1 – 1 (a.e.t.) (4 – 5 p) | Buriram United (T1) | Chonburi |
| 19:00 (UTC+7) | Nurul Sriyankem 86' | Report | Jajá Coelho 19' | Stadium: Chonburi Stadium; Attendance: 6,785; Referee: Sivakorn Pu-udom |
| | Penalties |
| | Worachit Kanitsribampen (penalty scored); Thiago Cunha (penalty scored); Fodé Diakité (penalty missed); Ryotaro Nakano (penalty scored); Kritsada Kaman (penalty scored) | | (penalty scored) Diogo; (penalty scored) Go Seul-ki; (penalty scored) Jakkaphan Kaewprom; (penalty scored) Siwarak Tedsungnoen; (penalty scored) Jajá Coelho |

| 1 October 2017 | Sukhothai (T1) | 2 – 2 (a.e.t.) (4 – 2 p) | Pattaya United (T1) | Sukhothai |
| 19:00 (UTC+7) | Jung Myung-oh 45+3'; Hiromichi Katano 69' (pen.) | Report | Picha U-Tra 30'; Aleksandar Jevtić 53' | Stadium: Thung Thalay Luang Stadium; Attendance: 2,068; Referee: Weerapol Laosuphan |
| | Penalties |
| | Hiromichi Katano (penalty scored); Piyarat Lajungreed (penalty scored); Kabfah Boonmatoon (penalty scored); Sansern Limwattana (penalty scored) | | (penalty missed) Aleksandar Jevtić; (penalty scored) Wellington Priori; (penalty missed) Mongkol Tossakrai; (penalty scored) Suphanan Bureerat |

| 1 October 2017 | SCG Muangthong United (T1) | 2 – 1 | Bangkok United (T1) | Nonthaburi |
| 19:00 (UTC+7) | Leandro Assumpção 68' (pen.); Teerasil Dangda 87' | Report | Jaycee Okwunwanne 22' | Stadium: SCG Stadium; Attendance: 8,091; Referee: Wiwat Jampa-on |

| 1 October 2017 | Rayong (T2) | 0 – 4 | Chiangrai United (T1) | Rayong |
| 19:00 (UTC+7) | | Report | Jandson 14'; Rafael Coelho 30', 46'; Thitipan Puangchan 45' | Stadium: Rayong Provincial Stadium; Attendance: 1,046; Referee: Suwat Wongsuwan |

=== Quarter-finals ===
The quarter-finals round will be featured by eight clubs which were the winners of the second round, including seven clubs from T1 and one club from T2. Quarter-finals round had drawn on 5 October 2017 by FA Thailand.

| 11 October 2017 | Buriram United (T1) | 0 – 2 | SCG Muangthong United (T1) | Buriram |
| 18:00 (UTC+7) | | Report | Leandro Assumpção 57'; Theerathon Bunmathan 69' | Stadium: i-mobile Stadium; Attendance: 29,875; Referee: Phummarin Khamruen |

| 11 October 2017 | Air Force Central (T2) | 0 – 1 | BEC Tero Sasana (T1) | Pathum Thani |
| 18:00 (UTC+7) | | Report | Pichitphong Choeichiu 11' | Stadium: Thupatemi Stadium; Attendance: 3,256; Referee: Kiatcharoen Ruangpan |

| 11 October 2017 | Chiangrai United (T1) | 4 – 1 | Ubon UMT United (T1) | Chiangrai |
| 19:00 (UTC+7) | Piyaphon Phanichakul 43'; Jandson dos Santos 51'; Felipe Azevedo 60', 65' | Report | Kenta Yamazaki 63' | Stadium: Singha Stadium; Attendance: 1,152; Referee: Songkran Boonmeekiat |

| 11 October 2017 | Ratchaburi Mitr Phol (T1) | 1 – 0 | Sukhothai (T1) | Ratchaburi |
| 19:30 (UTC+7) | Alharbi El Jadeyaoui 33' | Report | | Stadium: Mitr Phol Stadium; Attendance: 1,842; Referee: Wiwat Jampa-on |

=== Semi-finals ===
The semi-finals round will be featured by four clubs which were the winners of the quarter-finals round, all of them were the clubs from T1. Semi-finals round had drawn on 17 October 2017 by FA Thailand.

| 4 November 2017 | SCG Muangthong United (T1) | 2 – 1 | BEC Tero Sasana (T1) | Bangkok |
| 19:00 (UTC+7) | Teerasil Dangda 43', 67' | Report | Jaka Ihbeisheh 65' (pen.) | Stadium: Rajamangala Stadium; Attendance: 4,921; Referee: Phummarin Khamruen |

| 4 November 2017 | Ratchaburi Mitr Phol (T1) | 0 – 1 | Chiangrai United (T1) | Bangkok |
| 19:00 (UTC+7) | | Report | Felipe Azevedo 14' | Stadium: Supachalasai Stadium; Attendance: 4,629; Referee: Sivakorn Pu-udom |

=== Final ===
The final will be featured by the winners of the semi-finals round, both were the clubs from T1. A match of this round was held on 22 November 2017.

| 22 November 2017 | SCG Muangthong United (T1) | 2 – 0 | Chiangrai United (T1) | Bangkok |
| 19:00 (UTC+7) | Peerapat Notchaiya 35'; Teerasil Dangda 61' | Report | | Stadium: Supachalasai Stadium; Attendance: 16,788; Referee: Sivakorn Pu-udom |

== Top goalscorers ==
As of 22 November 2017 from official website.

| Rank | Player | Club | Goals |
|---|---|---|---|
| 1 | (Thailand) Teerasil Dangda | SCG Muangthong United | 5 |
| 2 | (Trinidad and Tobago) Kendall Jagdeosingh | Ayutthaya United | 4 |
| 2 | (Brazil) Felipe Azevedo | Chiangrai United | 4 |
| 4 | (Brazil) Vinicius Silva | Kamphaengphet | 3 |
| 4 | (Thailand) Chaiyaphat Rattanathanangpong | Krung Thonburi | 3 |
| 4 | (Spain) Sergio Suárez | Port | 3 |
| 4 | (Thailand) Thanakorn Niyomwan | PTT Rayong | 3 |
| 4 | (Thailand) Montree Promsawat | Ratchaburi Mitr Phol | 3 |
| 4 | (Brazil) Leandro Assumpção | SCG Muangthong United | 3 |

== See also ==
- 2017 Thai League
- 2017 Thai League 2
- 2017 Thai League 3
- 2017 Thai League 4
- 2017 Thailand Amateur League
- 2017 Thai FA Cup
- 2017 Thailand Champions Cup
