= Phitsanulok F.C. =

Thai football club

Phitsanulok F.C. พิษณุโลก เอฟ.ซี.
- Full name: Phitsanulok Football Club สโมสรฟุตบอลจังหวัดพิษณุโลก
- Nicknames: Naresuan Warlords ขุนพลนเรศวร
- Founded: 2007; 19 years ago as Phitsanulok F.C.
- Ground: Phitsanulok PAO. Stadium; Phitsanulok, Thailand
- Capacity: 3,066
- Chairman: Siripong Tharajongsuk
- Head Coach: Vimol Jankam
- League: Thai League 3
- 2025–26: Thai League 3, 7th of 12 in the Northern region
Home colours	Away colours

Phitsanulok Football Club (Thai: สโมสรฟุตบอลจังหวัดพิษณุโลก) is a Thai professional football club based in city of Phitsanulok in Phitsanulok province. The club currently plays in the Thai League 3 Northern Region.

== History ==
At the beginning of the 2009 season, Bangkok Bank F.C. withdrew from the league before the season began. FAT therefore decided that to fill the league with 16 teams, they would run a pre-season competition featuring the 4 relegated clubs from the Thailand Division 1 League 2008 season. Phitsanulok F.C. were one of these clubs, however, they were beaten by Nakhon Sawan in the semi-final 2–1, therefore relegated to Thai Division 2 League.

During the second leg of the 2011 season the team was renamed to Phitsanulok TSY F.C. after Thai Seng Yont became the main sponsor of the team. After the team's failure in the 2014 season and the resulting relegation to the regional league, the team returned in 2015 under new management and a new name – Phitsanulok F.C. 2015.

In 2022, Phitsanulok competed in the Thai League 3 for the 2022–23 season. It is their 16th season in the professional league. The club started the season with a 2–0 away win over Rongseemaechaithanachotiwat Phayao and they ended the season with a 3–1 home win over Rongseemaechaithanachotiwat Phayao. The club has finished 1st place in the league of the Northern region and advanced to the national championship stage. In addition, in the 2022–23 Thai FA Cup Phitsanulok was defeated 1–2 by Bangkok United in the fourth round, causing them to be eliminated and in the 2022–23 Thai League Cup Phitsanulok was defeated 0–4 by Bangkok United in the second round, causing them to be eliminated too.

== Stadium and locations ==
Coordinates	Location	Stadium	Capacity	Year
16°49′54″N 100°12′46″E	Phitsanulok	Pibulsongkram Rajabhat Stadium	?	2007–2008
16°50′47″N 100°15′52″E	Phitsanulok	Phitsanulok PAO. Stadium	3,066	2009–2017

== Season by season record ==
Season	League									FA Cup	League Cup	T3 Cup	Top goalscorer	
Season	Division	P	W	D	L	F	A	Pts	Pos	FA Cup	League Cup	T3 Cup	Name	Goals
2007	DIV1	22	7	8	7	29	26	29	5th					
2008	DIV1	30	4	6	20	31	76	18	16th					
2009	DIV2 North	20	6	7	7	32	33	25	6th	R1				
2010	DIV2 North	30	13	7	10	36	9	46	7th	-	R1			
2011	DIV2 North	28	20	7	1	58	16	67	1st	R3	QR1			
2012	DIV2 North	34	21	11	2	51	18	74	2nd	-	QR1			
2013	DIV2 North	30	18	9	3	51	16	63	2nd	-	R1			
2014	DIV1	34	9	11	14	36	57	38	16th	R2	R1		(Thailand) Yod Chanthawong	10
2015	DIV2 North	26	12	11	3	36	19	47	4th	R3	QR1			
2016	DIV2 North	22	9	5	8	31	26	35	6th	Opted out	QR1			
2017	T4 North	24	13	6	5	51	30	45	3rd	R2	QR1		(Ivory Coast) Diarra Aboubacar Sidick	15
2018	T4 North	18	9	2	7	32	22	29	3rd	R1	QR2		(Thailand) Anucha Panthong	7
2019	T4 North	27	12	9	6	43	25	45	4th	QR	QR1		(Thailand) Jirawut Saranan	11
2020–21	T3 North	14	10	2	2	25	8	32	3rd	QR	QR2		(Thailand) Chatchai Narkwijit	9
2021–22	T3 North	22	11	8	3	28	15	41	2nd	R2	R1		(Brazil) Gilberto Macena	10
2022–23	T3 North	22	17	5	0	60	17	56	1st	R4	R2		(Brazil) Gilberto Macena, (Argentina) Nicolás Vélez	11
2023–24	T3 North	20	10	8	2	43	22	38	3rd	R1	QRP	R1	(Brazil) Caio da Conceição Silva	14
2024–25	T3 North	20	10	1	9	22	19	31	5th	R1	QRP	SF	(Nigeria) Ekene Victor Azike	10
2025–26	T3 North	22	7	9	6	24	29	30	7th	R2	QR1	Opted out	(Republic of the Congo) Burnel Okana-Stazi	12
2026–27	T3 North										QR1			

Champions	Runners-up	Third Place	Promoted	Relegated

- P = Played
- W = Games won
- D = Games drawn
- L = Games lost
- F = Goals for
- A = Goals against
- Pts = Points
- Pos = Final position

- QR1 = First Qualifying Round
- QR2 = Second Qualifying Round
- R1 = Round 1
- R2 = Round 2
- R3 = Round 3
- R4 = Round 4

- R5 = Round 5
- R6 = Round 6
- QF = Quarter-finals
- SF = Semi-finals
- RU = Runners-up
- W = Winners

== Club staff ==
Position	Name
Club President	(Thailand) Siripong Tharajongsuk
Manager	(Thailand) Manatthanan Chaichet
Head coach	(Thailand) Vimol Jankam
Assistant coach	(Thailand) Kritsana Taiwan
Goalkeeping Coach	(Thailand) Krit Pinyo
Fitness Coach	(Thailand) Anuphol Intaraj
Physio	(Thailand) Pongsit Phosri
General Coordinator	(Thailand) Naruemon Bunkerd
Team Staff	(Thailand) Apichart Daengim (Thailand) Salisa Srisakraphop (Thailand) Thanatat Kuicharoen
Media Officer	(Thailand) Mataphum Duangyai

== Players ==
=== Current squad ===
As of 20 December 2024

Note: Flags indicate national team as defined under FIFA eligibility rules; some limited exceptions apply. Players may hold more than one non-FIFA nationality.

No.	Pos.	Nation	Player
3	DF	THA	Anuyut Mudlem
4	DF	THA	Pissanu Sibutta
5	MF	THA	Todsawee Deeprasert
6	DF	THA	Chompoo Sangpo
7	FW	KOR	Jo Woo-hyuk
8	MF	RUS	Erik Zaerko
10	MF	THA	Thiwakon Seegun
11	FW	THA	Jeerachai Ladadok
13	MF	THA	Kritsana Taiwan
15	GK	THA	Peradach Bunkame
16	MF	THA	Anupap Onglaor
17	DF	THA	Yuwarat Damsungnoen
18	MF	THA	Thawatchai Auppanan
19	DF	THA	Makawan Kerdanan
22	DF	THA	Chawanthananchai Sirichoo
23	GK	THA	Sangphet Puklongyong

No.	Pos.	Nation	Player
24	MF	THA	Chayapon Chahveejan
25	FW	NGR	Ekene Victor Azike
27	DF	THA	Ratthaphon Hommala
28	DF	THA	Sakphon Prasitsuwan
30	FW	THA	Siraphat Phromlee
31	GK	THA	Kaiwit Sanmano
35	FW	THA	Arnon Buspha
36	MF	THA	Kittichai Martsala
37	FW	THA	Jakkit Niyomsuk
39	MF	THA	Natthawut Nueamai
40	DF	THA	Wanchana Rattana
42	DF	THA	Phongsaphak Duanyai
71	MF	THA	Nattaphat Nopynonmueng
92	GK	THA	Chaturong Singjanusong
99	FW	THA	Anuluk Yeunhan

== Honours ==
=== League ===
- Thai League 3 Northern Region
  - Winners (1): 2022–23
  - Runner-up (1): 2021–22
- Regional League Northern Division
  - Winners (1): 2011
  - Runner-up (2): 2012, 2013
- Thai League 4 Northern Region
  - Third place (2): 2017, 2018
