= 2011 Thai League Cup =

Tournament details
- Country: Thailand
- Dates: 18 May 2011 – 4 February 2012
- Teams: 97

Final positions
- Champions: Buriram PEA (1st title)
- Runners-up: Thai Port

Tournament statistics
- Matches played: 109
- Goals scored: 318 (2.92 per match)
- Top goal scorer(s): Wasan Natasan (8 goals)

Awards
- Best player: Rangsan Viwatchaichok

The Thai League Cup is a knock-out football tournament played in Thailand. Some games are played as a single match, others are played as two-legged contests. The 2011 Thai League Cup kicked off on 18 May 2011 with the Bangkok & field regional qualifiers.

Buriram PEA F.C. were the winners.

== Calendar ==
Round	Date	Matches	Clubs	New entries this round
Qualifying first round	18 May 2011	29	58 → 21 to first round and 8 to qualifying second round	58
Qualifying second round	1 June 2011; 2 June 2011	4	8 → 4	
First round	18 June 2011; 19 June 2011; 26 June 2011; 2 July 2011	32	21 + 4 + 39 → 32	39
Second round	28 June 2011; 29 June 2011; 1 July 2011; 6 July 2011	16	32 → 16	
Third round	5 July 2011; 6 July 2011; 13 July 2011; 2 August 2011; 3 August 2011; 10 August 2011	16	16 → 8	
Quarter-finals	17 August 2011; 18 August 2011; 24 August 2011; 14 September 2011; 18 September 2011	8	8 → 4	
Semi-finals	14 September 2011; 21 September 2011; 1 October 2011	4	4 → 2	
Final	4 February 2012	1	2 → Champions	

== Qualifying rounds ==
This is the first edition of the competition and the qualifying round will be played in regions featuring clubs from the Regional League Division 2, had to compete in the qualifying rounds. it was divided into five groups by geographic region.

== First round ==
Team 1	Score	Team 2
18 June 2011
Udon Thani	1–3 ( ET)	Chiangmai
Chamchuri United	0–2 ( ET)	BEC Tero Sasana
Maptaphut Rayong	0–1	Suphanburi
Roi Et United	2–2 (4–3 p)	Army United
Phetchabun	1–2	TTM Phichit
Phrae United	0–4	Bangkok Glass
Kalasin	0–0 (0–3 p)	Police United
Nakhon Si Thammarat	0–2	Bangkok
Tak ^{2}	0–1	Raj-Pracha
Pattani	0–1 ( ET)	SCG.Samut Songkhram
Bangkok United	0–1 ( ET)	TOT SC
Rayong	0–1 (ET)	Thai Honda
Prachinburi	0–2	Chonburi
Mahasarakham United ^{2}	1–0	Air Force United
Ayutthaya	1–3	Thai Port (C)
Thanyaburi RA United ^{2}	0–1	F.C. Phuket
Trang	3–1 ( ET)	Cash Today Chanthaburi
Singburi	0–5	Muangthong United
Nakhon Ratchasima	0–2	BBCU
Globlex ^{5}	1–1 (5–4 p)	J.W. Rangsit
Phetchaburi	1–2 ( ET)	Sriracha
19 June 2011
Nakhon Phanom	3–4 ( ET)	Khonkaen
Nan	1–0	RBAC Mittraphap
Phattalung	1–0	Songkhla
Samut Prakan	1–1 (3–5 p)	Sisaket
Ang Thong	0–1	Samut Prakan Customs United
Kabin City	1–4	Siam Navy
Kasem Bundit University	0–5	Buriram PEA (RC)
Kasetsart University	2–1	Osotspa Saraburi
Nakhon Sawan	1–5	Chiangrai United
26 June 2011
Buriram	2–0 ( ET)	Chainat
2 July 2011
PTT Rayong	1–2 ( ET)	Pattaya United

^{2} Tak, Mahasarakham United and Thanyaburi RA United have lucky of lotting to automatic qualify to first round.
^{3} (C) is Champion in last season.
^{4} (RC) is Runner-up in last season.
^{5} Gulf Saraburi which automatic qualifying to first round withdrew before lotting.Globlex had lotted to replace its.

== Bracket ==
Second round
Siam Navy	1
Chiangrai United( ET)	4
Khonkaen ( ET)	2
SCG.Samut Songkhram	1
Bangkok Glass	1
Police United	3
Thai Port	3
TOT SC	1
Phattalung	3
Roi Et United	1
Trang( ET)	1
Nan	0
F.C. Phuket( ET)	2
Thai Honda	1
Raj-Pracha	1
Sriracha	2
Globlex	0
Chiangmai( ET)	1
Buriram PEA(p))	1(5)
Buriram	1(3)
TTM Phichit	1(1)
BEC Tero Sasana(p)	1(4)
Suphanburi	1
Pattaya United	0
Chonburi	6
Mahasarakham United	0
Sisaket	2
Bangkok	1
Muangthong United	4
Samut Prakan Customs United	1
Kasetsart University( ET)	3
Thai Honda	2

Third round
Chiangrai United	1	1	2
Khonkaen	0	1	1
Police United	0	0	0
Thai Port	0	2	2
Phattalung	2	1	3
Trang	1	1	2
F.C. Phuket	1	3	4
Sriracha	1	2	3
Chiangmai	0	1	1
Buriram PEA	0	3	3
BEC Tero Sasana	0	1	1
Suphanburi	0	0	0
Chonburi	1	1	2
Sisaket	0	1	1
Muangthong United	2	2	4
Kasetsart University	1	2	3

Quarter-finals
Chiangrai United	1	0	1
Thai Port (a)	1	0	1
Phattalung	1	3	4
F.C. Phuket	0	3	3
Buriram PEA	2	6	8
BEC Tero Sasana	1	2	3
Chonburi	3	0	3
Muangthong United	2	0	2

Semi-finals
Thai Port	3	0	3
Phattalung	0	1	1
Buriram PEA (a)	1	2	3
Chonburi	0	3	3

Final
Thai Port	0
Buriram PEA	2

== Second round ==
Team 1	Score	Team 2
28 June 2011
Raj-Pracha	1–2	Sriracha
29 June 2011
Siam Navy	1–4 ( ET)	Chiangrai United
Globlex ^{5}	0–1 ( ET)	Chiangmai
Trang	1–0	Nan
Chonburi	6–0	Mahasarakham United ^{2}
Muangthong United	4–1	Samut Prakan Customs United
TTM Phichit	1–1 (1–4 p)	BEC Tero Sasana
Thai Port (C)	3–1	TOT SC
Bangkok Glass	1–3	Police United
Sisaket	2–1 ( ET)	Bangkok
Khonkaen	2–1 ( ET)	SCG.Samut Songkhram
F.C. Phuket	2–1 ( ET)	BBCU
Kasetsart University	3–2 ( ET)	Thai Honda
Phattalung	3–1	Roi Et United
1 July 2011
Buriram PEA (RC)	1–1 ( 5–3 p )	Buriram
6 July 2011
Suphanburi	1–0	Pattaya United

== Third round ==
Team 1	Agg.	Team 2	1st leg	2nd leg
1st leg on 5 July 2011.............2nd leg on 3 August 2011
Chiangmai	1–3	Buriram PEA (RC)	0–0	1–3
1st leg on 6 July 2011.............2nd leg on 2 August 2011
Muangthong United	4–3	Kasetsart University	2–1	2–2
1st leg on 6 July 2011.............2nd leg on 13 July 2011
Phattalung	3–2	Trang	2–1	1–1
Chiangrai United	2–1	Khonkaen	1–0	1–1
F.C. Phuket	4–3	Sriracha	1–1	3–2
1st leg on 6 July 2011.............2nd leg on 3 August 2011
Chonburi	2–1	Sisaket	1–0	1–1
Police United	0–2	Thai Port (C)	0–0	0–2
1st leg on 3 August 2011.............2nd leg on 10 August 2011
BEC Tero Sasana	2–0	Suphanburi	2–0	0–0

== Quarter-finals ==
Team 1	Agg.	Team 2	1st leg	2nd leg
1st leg on 17 August 2011.............2nd leg on 24 August 2011
Chiangrai United	1–1	Thai Port (C)	1–1	0–0
Phattalung	4–2	F.C. Phuket	1–0	3–2
1st leg on 17 August 2011.............2nd leg on 18 September 2011
Chonburi	3–2	Muangthong United	3–2	0–0
1st leg on 18 August 2011.............2nd leg on 14 September 2011
Buriram PEA (RC)	8–3	BEC Tero Sasana	2–1	6–2

== Semi-finals ==
Team 1	Agg.	Team 2	1st leg	2nd leg
1st leg on 14 September 2011.............2nd leg on 21 September 2011
Thai Port (C)	3–1	Phattalung	3–0	0–1
1st leg on 21 September 2011.............2nd leg on 21 September 2011
Buriram PEA (RC)	3–3	Chonburi	1–0	2–3

== Finals ==
Team 1	Score	Team 2
4 February 2012
Thai Port	0–2	Buriram PEA
