= Makawan Kerdanan =

Thai footballer (born 1997)

Personal information
- Full name: Makawan Kerdanan
- Date of birth: 14 July 1997 (age 29)
- Place of birth: Lopburi, Thailand
- Positions: Defensive midfielder; right back

Team information
- Current team: Phitsanulok
- Number: 19

Youth career
- 2009–2011: Bangkok Glass
- 2012–2014: Bayer Leverkusen
- 2014–2017: Braga

Senior career*
Years	Team	Apps	(Gls)
2017	Ratchaburi Mitr Phol	0	(0)
2018	Nakhon Ratchasima	1	(0)
2019	Ubon United	10	(0)
2020	MOF Customs United	5	(0)
2020	Samut Sakhon	2	(0)
2020	Nakhon Si United	0	(0)
2021–2022	Udon Thani	42	(0)
2023–2024	Suphanburi	8	(0)
2024	Pattani	7	(0)
2025–	Phitsanulok	0	(0)

International career
2016	Thailand U20	3	(0)
- * Club domestic league appearances and goals as of 24 November 2024

Makawan Kerdanan (Thai: มฆวัน เกิดอนันต์, born July 14, 1997) is a Thai professional footballer who plays as a defensive midfielder for Phitsanulok in Thai League 3.
