= Chatchai Narkwijit =

Thai footballer (born 1988)

Personal information
- Date of birth: 13 September 1988 (age 38)
- Place of birth: Sukhothai, Thailand
- Height: 1.74 m (5 ft 9 in)
- Positions: Forward; winger

Team information
- Current team: Chiangmai United
- Number: 90

Youth career
- 2004–2006: Ratwinit Bangkaeo School

Senior career*
Years	Team	Apps	(Gls)
2007–2008	BEC Tero Sasana	10	(1)
2007	→ Muangthong United (loan)	21	(11)
2008	→ Muangthong United (loan)	16	(4)
2009–2015	Chiangrai United	24	(1)
2013	→ Chiangmai (loan)	30	(32)
2015–2016	Chiangmai	52	(8)
2017–2018	JL Chiangmai United	52	(40)
2019	Kohkwang	31	(21)
2020–2021	Phitsanulok	18	(12)
2021–2023	Uttaradit	43	(25)
2023–2024	Phitsanulok	17	(0)
2024–2025	Northern Nakhon Mae Sot United	17	(3)
2025–	Chiangmai United	10	(1)
- * Club domestic league appearances and goals as of 13 March 2026 (UTC)

Chatchai Narkwijit (Thai: ฉัตรชัย นาควิจิตร, born 13 September 1988) is a Thai professional footballer who plays as a forward or winger for Thai League 2 club Chiangmai United.

== Honours ==
Muangthong United

- Thai Division 2 League: 2007

Chiangrai United

- Thai Division 2 League: 2009

Chiangmai

- Thai Division 2 League: 2013

JL Chiangmai United

- Thai League 4: 2017
- Thai League 3: 2018
