= Pibulsongkram Rajabhat Stadium =

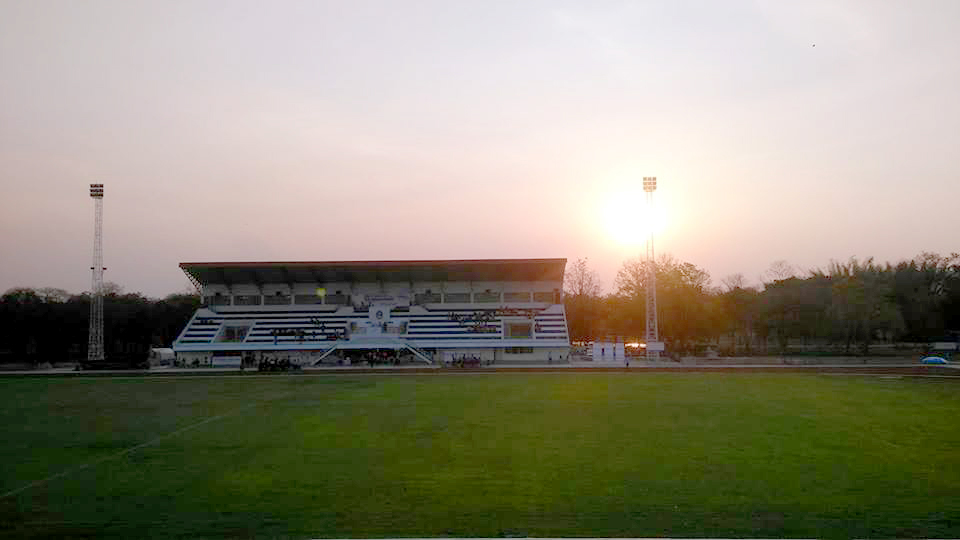
- Interactive map of Pibulsongkram Rajabhat Stadium
- Location: Phitsanulok, Thailand
- Coordinates: 16°49′54″N 100°12′46″E
- Capacity: 3,000
- Surface: Grass

Tenant
- Phitsanulok

Pibulsongkram Rajabhat Stadium (Thai: สนามกีฬามหาวิทยาลัยราชภัฏพิบูลสงคราม) is a multi-purpose stadium in Phitsanulok Province, Thailand. It is currently used mostly for football matches and is the home stadium of Phitsanulok. The stadium holds 3,000 people.
