= Kritsana Taiwan =

Thai footballer (born 1984)

Personal information
- Full name: Kritsana Taiwan
- Date of birth: 4 February 1984 (age 42)
- Place of birth: Pathum Thani, Thailand
- Height: 1.70 m (5 ft 7 in)
- Position: Attacking midfielder

Team information
- Current team: Phitsanulok
- Number: 16

Senior career*
Years	Team	Apps	(Gls)
2008–2011	Air Force United	37	(2)
2011–2013	Pattaya United	49	(4)
2014	Krabi	21	(6)
2015–2019	Angthong	29	(6)
2020–	Phitsanulok	18	(0)

Managerial career
- 2021–: Phitsanulok (assistant)
- 2021: Phitsanulok (caretaker)
- 2022: Phitsanulok (caretaker)
- 2022–2023: Phitsanulok
- * Club domestic league appearances and goals as of 6 May 2023

Kritsana Taiwan (Thai: กฤษณะ ต่ายวัลย์; born February 4, 1984) is a Thai professional footballer.

== Honours ==
Phitsanulok

- Thai League 3 Northern Region: 2022–23
