= Uttaradit F.C. =

Thai football club

Uttaradit อุตรดิตถ์
- Full name: Uttaradit Football Club สโมสรฟุตบอลจังหวัดอุตรดิตถ์
- Nicknames: The Broken Sword (ดาบหักพิฆาต)
- Founded: 2009; 17 years ago
- Ground: Uttaradit Province Stadium; Uttaradit, Thailand
- Capacity: 3,245
- Chairman: Panatsaya Porjit
- Head coach: Anucha Chaiyawong
- League: Thai League 2
- 2025–26: Thai League 3, 4th of 11 in the Northern region (promoted)
Home colours	Away colours	Third colours

Uttaradit Football Club (Thai: สโมสรฟุตบอลจังหวัดอุตรดิตถ์) is a Thai professional football club based in Uttaradit province. They currently play in Thai League 2 from 2026–27 after promotion from Thai League 3 Northern Region in 2025–26.

== Timeline ==
History of events of Uttaradit Football Club

Year	Important events
2009	The club is formed as Uttaradit Football Club, nicknamed The Fighting Cocks; Club admitted to the Regional League Northern Division; Home games to be played at Uttaradit Stadium; Atithep Yoosawad named as the first ever coach of Uttaradit

In 2022, Uttaradit Saksiam competed in the Thai League 3 for the 2022–23 season. It is their 14th season in the professional league. The club started the season with a 4–0 home win over Maejo United and they ended the season with a 2–1 away win over Maejo United. The club has finished 2nd place in the league of the Northern region and advanced to the national championship stage. In addition, in the 2022–23 Thai FA Cup Uttaradit Saksiam was penalty shoot-out defeated 3–5 by Roi Et PB United in the first round, causing them to be eliminated and in the 2022–23 Thai League Cup Uttaradit Saksiam was defeated 0–2 by Chiangmai in the qualification play-off round, causing them to be eliminated too.

On 31 May 2026, Uttaradit secure promotion to Thai League 2 for the first time in their history from next season after defeat Muang Loei United on aggregate 1–4.

== Stadium and locations ==
Coordinates	Location	Stadium	Capacity	Year
17°36′34″N 100°06′37″E	Uttaradit	Uttaradit Province Stadium	3,245	2009
17°38′05″N 100°05′35″E	Uttaradit	Uttaradit Rajabhat University Stadium	?	2010
17°36′34″N 100°06′37″E	Uttaradit	Uttaradit Province Stadium	3,245	2010–present

== Season records ==
Season	League									FA Cup	League Cup	T3 Cup	Top goalscorer	
Season	Division	P	W	D	L	F	A	Pts	Pos	FA Cup	League Cup	T3 Cup	Name	Goals
2009	DIV2 North	20	10	3	7	36	35	33	4th					
2010	DIV2 North	30	11	3	16	40	52	36	10th					
2011	DIV2 North	30	13	9	8	56	41	48	4th					
2012	DIV2 North	34	13	10	11	53	44	49	7th					
2013	DIV2 North	30	4	10	16	22	44	22	14th					
2014	DIV2 North	26	8	5	13	22	34	29	9th					
2015	DIV2 North	26	6	9	11	22	37	27	12th	R2	QR2			
2016	DIV2 North	22	4	5	13	25	39	17	10th	QR	QR2		(South Korea) Noh Hyeong-cheol	10
2017	T4 North	24	13	5	6	36	26	44	4th	R1	QR1		(South Korea) Noh Hyeong-cheol	7
2018	T4 North	18	13	4	1	39	14	43	1st	R2	QR2		(Ivory Coast) Diarra Aboubacar Sidick	12
2019	T4 North	27	20	6	1	77	16	66	1st	R1	QR1		(Brazil) Giuberty Silva Neves	13
2020–21	T3 North	15	8	1	6	22	18	25	4th	R1	Opted out		(Thailand) Kaikitti Inuthen	5
2021–22	T3 North	22	7	7	8	27	22	28	7th	Opted out	Opted out		(Thailand) Chatchai Narkwijit	14
2022–23	T3 North	22	15	3	4	45	19	48	2nd	R1	QRP		(Thailand) Chatchai Narkwijit, (Thailand) Phufah Chuenkomrak	13
2023–24	T3 North	20	5	7	8	24	26	22	6th	R2	QR2	SF	(Egypt) Basam Radwan	7
2024–25	T3 North	20	9	6	5	31	28	33	4th	QR	QR2	LP	(Thailand) Kaison Roungreang, (Thailand) Saran Sridet	5
2025–26	T3 North	22	12	9	1	55	15	45	1st	R3	R1	LP		

Champions	Runners-up	Promoted	Relegated

- P = Played
- W = Games won
- D = Games drawn
- L = Games lost
- F = Goals for
- A = Goals against
- Pts = Points
- Pos = Final position
- DQ = Disqualified
- QR1 = First Qualifying Round
- QR2 = Second Qualifying Round
- QR3 = Third Qualifying Round
- QR4 = Fourth Qualifying Round
- RInt = Intermediate Round
- R1 = Round 1
- R2 = Round 2
- R3 = Round 3
- R4 = Round 4
- R5 = Round 5
- R6 = Round 6
- GR = Group stage
- QF = Quarter-finals
- SF = Semi-finals
- RU = Runners-up
- S = Shared
- W = Winners

== Players ==
=== Current squad ===
As of 30 September 2026

Note: Flags indicate national team as defined under FIFA eligibility rules; some limited exceptions apply. Players may hold more than one non-FIFA nationality.

No.	Pos.	Nation	Player
3	DF	THA	Sumana Salapphet
5	DF	THA	Nattawat Wongsri
6	DF	THA	Worrapat Sukkapan
7	MF	THA	Chonlawit Kanuengkid
8	MF	THA	Suchanon Malison
10	MF	BRA	Werick Caetano
11	FW	THA	Chanayut Srisawat
16	DF	THA	Nirut Jamroensri
17	MF	THA	Kritsada Sriwanit
18	MF	THA	Promdan Benjasiri
26	MF	THA	Surachett Khunnu

No.	Pos.	Nation	Player
28	MF	THA	Tochiao Yodthong
30	GK	THA	Chakhon Philakhlang
31	MF	THA	Wasan Mala
35	DF	THA	Jackarin Thongpanchang
36	DF	THA	Rachen Sobunma
37	MF	THA	Phufah Chuenkromrak (Captain)
43	DF	BRA	Brendon Lucas
55	DF	THA	Suwat Junboonpha
91	FW	BRA	Luan Santos
95	FW	BRA	Judivan
96	DF	THA	Punnapob Namanu
99	GK	THA	Itthipon Kamsuprom

== Club officials ==
Position	Staff
Team Manager	(Thailand) Wirot Porchit
Head coach	(Thailand) Anucha Chaiyawong
Assistant coach	(Thailand) Manoch Songkrajang
Goalkeeper coach	(Thailand) Nares Sangnak
Team officer	(Thailand) Opas Pannopasri
Marketing manager	(Thailand) Chaipat Atpanan
Public relations manager	(Thailand) Nopson Chantarojawong
Assistant marketing and public relations manager	(Thailand) Sichon Ngamgon
Club Secretary	(Thailand) Sudarat Muangchey

== Honours ==
=== Domestic leagues ===
- Thai League 3
  - Runners-up (1): 2025–26
- Thai League 3 Northern Region
  - Winners: 2025–26
- Thai League 4 Northern Region
  - Winners (2): 2018, 2019
