= Owusu Hayford =

Ghanaian footballer

Personal information
- Full name: Oiliver Akowuah Owusu Hayford
- Date of birth: October 25, 1990 (age 36)
- Place of birth: Sekondi-Takoradi, Ghana
- Height: 1.80 m (5 ft 11 in)
- Position: Attacking midfielder

Team information
- Current team: Nakhon Pathom
- Number: 24

Senior career*
Years	Team	Apps	(Gls)
2004–2005	Kessben F.C.		
2006	Chanthaburi F.C.	13	(0)
2007–2008	Nakhon Pathom	45	(6)
- * Club domestic league appearances and goals as of 14 November 2008

Oiliver Akowuah Owusu Hayford (born 25 October 1981) is a former professional footballer from Ghana. He last plays for Nakhon Pathom in the Thailand Premier League.

== Personal life ==
Owusu is the son of former footballer and coach Bashir Hayford (father) and the late Nusrat Owusu Hayford (mother), who died in June 2008.
