= Nan F.C. =

Thai football club

Nan FC น่าน เอฟซี
- Full name: Nan Football Club สโมสรฟุตบอลจังหวัดน่าน
- Nickname(s): The Red Hawkes เหยี่ยวแดงพิฆาต
- Founded: 2010; 15 years ago
- Ground: Nan Provincial Stadium; Nan, Thailand
- Capacity: 4,000
- Owner: Josh
- Chairman: Chaiyanun Hanyut
- Head Coach: Anucha Chaiwong
- League: Thailand Semi-pro League
- 2022–23: Thai League 3, 5th of 12 in the Northern region
| Home colours | Away colours |

Nan Football Club (Thai สโมสรฟุตบอลจังหวัดน่าน) is a Thai professional football club based in Mueang, Nan. The club currently plays in Thailand Semi-pro League Northern Region.

== History ==
In 2022, Nan competed in the Thai League 3 for the 2022–23 season. It is their 12th season in the professional league. The club started the season with a 0–1 away defeat to Nakhon Mae Sot United and they ended the season with a 2–0 home win over Nakhon Mae Sot United. The club has finished 5th place in the league of the Northern region.

== Crest history ==
- In 2020, the club changed the logo color due to its tenth anniversary.
2019

== Stadium and locations ==
| Coordinates | Location | Stadium | Year |
|---|---|---|---|
| 18°48′36″N 100°47′26″E | Nan | Rajamangala University of Technology Nan Campus Stadium | 2011–2013 |
| 18°47′33″N 100°46′30″E | Nan | Nan PAO. Stadium | 2014–2019 |

== Season by season record ==
| Season | League | | | | | | | | | FA Cup | League Cup | Top goalscorer | |
| Season | Division | P | W | D | L | F | A | Pts | Pos | FA Cup | League Cup | Name | Goals |
|---|---|---|---|---|---|---|---|---|---|---|---|---|---|
| 2011 | DIV2 North | 30 | 7 | 5 | 18 | 31 | 46 | 26 | 13th | Not enter | R2 | | |
| 2012 | DIV2 North | 34 | 10 | 11 | 13 | 33 | 40 | 41 | 12th | Not enter | QR1 | | |
| 2013 | DIV2 North | 30 | 9 | 7 | 14 | 35 | 43 | 34 | 12th | Not enter | QR1 | | |
| 2014 | DIV2 North | 26 | 6 | 9 | 11 | 31 | 40 | 27 | 10th | Not enter | Not enter | | |
| 2015 | DIV2 North | 26 | 3 | 2 | 21 | 20 | 64 | 11 | 14th | R2 | QR1 | | |
| 2016 | DIV2 North | 22 | 4 | 7 | 11 | 33 | 35 | 19 | 9th | Not enter | QR1 | | |
| 2017 | T4 North | 24 | 11 | 7 | 6 | 28 | 20 | 40 | 5th | Not enter | QR1 | (Thailand) Niphon Phanprom, (Thailand) Siwanan Chaipanyasit | 5 |
| 2018 | T4 North | 18 | 10 | 2 | 6 | 28 | 18 | 32 | 2nd | QR | QRP | (Thailand) Siwanan Chaipanyasit | 9 |
| 2019 | T4 North | 27 | 12 | 7 | 8 | 49 | 34 | 43 | 5th | Not enter | Not enter | (Thailand) Santisak Tadthiang | 9 |
| 2020–21 | T3 North | 15 | 5 | 4 | 6 | 16 | 19 | 19 | 7th | Not enter | Not enter | (Thailand) Nattapong Meemanee | 8 |
| 2021–22 | T3 North | 22 | 4 | 5 | 13 | 18 | 33 | 17 | 11th | Not enter | Not enter | (Thailand) Chaiyahan Aunjit, (Thailand) Nattapong Meemanee | 4 |
| 2022–23 | T3 North | 22 | 9 | 6 | 7 | 22 | 20 | 33 | 5th | Not enter | Not enter | (Thailand) Chanayut Srisawat, (Thailand) Manop Kittiphirun | 7 |

| Champions | Runners-up | Third Place | Promoted | Relegated |

- P = Played
- W = Games won
- D = Games drawn
- L = Games lost
- F = Goals for
- A = Goals against
- Pts = Points
- Pos = Final position
- QR1 = First Qualifying Round
- QR2 = Second Qualifying Round
- R1 = Round 1
- R2 = Round 2
- R3 = Round 3
- R4 = Round 4
- R5 = Round 5
- R6 = Round 6
- QF = Quarter-finals
- SF = Semi-finals
- RU = Runners-up
- W = Winners

== Players ==
=== Current squad ===
As of 8 January 2023

Note: Flags indicate national team as defined under FIFA eligibility rules; some limited exceptions apply. Players may hold more than one non-FIFA nationality.

| No. | Pos. | Nation | Player |
|---|---|---|---|
| 4 | DF | (Thailand) THA | Yuttajak Kornchan |
| 8 | DF | (Thailand) THA | Kieattipong Khuanrobkat |
| 9 | MF | (Thailand) THA | Nattapong Meemanee |
| 10 | FW | (Thailand) THA | Yutthapichai Samanachangphueak |
| 11 | FW | (Thailand) THA | Saran Tadtiang |
| 13 | GK | (Thailand) THA | Supawit Takkinabod |
| 14 | GK | (Thailand) THA | Jiraphat Kamon |
| 17 | MF | (Thailand) THA | Peerapon Prikboonjan |
| 18 | FW | (Thailand) THA | Ampan Duangmala |
| 19 | FW | (Thailand) THA | Montharin Mala |
| 21 | DF | (Thailand) THA | Dullayawat Korcharoenput |

| No. | Pos. | Nation | Player |
|---|---|---|---|
| 22 | DF | (Thailand) THA | Passakorn Kamon |
| 23 | DF | (Thailand) THA | Saravut Maiwong |
| 26 | FW | (Thailand) THA | Somkhit Saesong |
| 29 | FW | (Thailand) THA | Anucha Chaiwong |
| 30 | FW | (Thailand) THA | Jeerasak Klabching |
| 36 | MF | (Thailand) THA | Montree Siriwattanasuwan |
| 37 | DF | (Thailand) THA | Chapphawit Waenluang |
| 39 | DF | (Thailand) THA | Atibodee Waiyakorn |
| 44 | MF | (Thailand) THA | Supachai Shsap |
| 77 | MF | (Thailand) THA | Piyanat Pomma |
| 91 | GK | (Thailand) THA | Natthaphat Sritecha |
