= Tak City F.C. =

Thai football club

Tak City ตาก ซิตี้
- Full name: Tak City Football Club สโมสรฟุตบอลตาก ซิตี้
- Nicknames: The Taksin Soldiers (นักรบพระเจ้าตาก)
- Founded: 2015; 11 years ago
- Ground: Tak Provincial Administrative Organization Stadium; Tak, Thailand
- Capacity: 3,171
- Chairman: (Thailand) Pricha Jaipetch
- Manager: (Thailand) Chumnan Praekhuntod
- League: Thai League 4
Home colours	Away colours

Tak City Football Club (Thai: สโมสรฟุตบอลตาก ซิตี้) is a Thai semi professional football new club based in Tak Province. They currently play in Thai League 4 Northern Region. This team Club-licensing football club didn't pass to play 2018 Thai League 4 Northern Region. This team is banned 2 years and Relegated to 2020 Thailand Amateur League Northern Region.

== Timeline ==
History of events of Tak Football Club

Year	Important events
2015	The club is formed as Tak Football Club, nicknamed The Tiger Soldiers; Club admitted to the Regional League Northern Division; Home games to be played at Tak Stadium; Chumnan Praekhuntod named as the first ever coach of Tak City

== Stadium and locations ==
Coordinates	Location	Stadium	Year
16°52′31″N 99°08′20″E	Tak	Tak PAO. Stadium	2015–2017

== Season by season record ==
Season	League									FA Cup	League Cup	Top goalscorer	
Season	Division	P	W	D	L	F	A	Pts	Pos	FA Cup	League Cup	Name	Goals
2015	North	26	10	9	7	27	19	39	5th	Not Enter	QR1		
2016	North	22	8	6	8	31	32	30	8th	Not Enter	R3		
2017	T4 North	24	6	4	14	24	33	22	7th	Not Enter	QR2	Waranyu Huangyat	5
2018–2019	Banned 2 years from Club-licensing don't pass												
2020	TA North												

Champions	Runners-up	Third Place	Promoted	Relegated

- P = Played
- W = Games won
- D = Games drawn
- L = Games lost
- F = Goals for
- A = Goals against
- Pts = Points
- Pos = Final position
- QR1 = First Qualifying Round
- QR2 = Second Qualifying Round
- R1 = Round 1
- R2 = Round 2
- R3 = Round 3
- R4 = Round 4
- R5 = Round 5
- R6 = Round 6
- QF = Quarter-finals
- SF = Semi-finals
- RU = Runners-up
- W = Winners

== Players ==
=== Current squad ===
Note: Flags indicate national team as defined under FIFA eligibility rules; some limited exceptions apply. Players may hold more than one non-FIFA nationality.

No.	Pos.	Nation	Player
