= Singburi Bangrajun F.C. =

Thai football club

Singburi Bangrajun สิงห์บุรี บางระจัน เอฟซี
- Full name: Singburi Bangrajun Football Club สโมสรฟุตบอลจังหวัดสิงห์บุรี
- Nicknames: The Bangrajan Warriors (นักสู้บางระจัน)
- Founded: 2009; 17 years ago
- Ground: Singburi Province Stadium; Sing Buri, Thailand
- Capacity: 3,449
- Chairman: Appisheep Tanpradapsin
- Manager: Peerapol Bumpen
- League: Thailand Semi-pro League
- 2023: 2nd, (Western Region)
Home colours	Away colours

Singburi Bangrajun Football Club (Thai สโมสรฟุตบอลจังหวัดสิงห์บุรี ) is a Thailand semi professional football club based in Singburi province. They currently play in Thai League 3 Northern region.

== Stadium and locations ==
Coordinates	Location	Stadium	Capacity	Year
14°53′40″N 100°24′37″E	Sing Buri	Singburi Province Stadium	3,449	2009–2017

== Seasons ==
Season	League									FA Cup	League Cup	Top goalscorer	
Season	Division	P	W	D	L	F	A	Pts	Pos	FA Cup	League Cup	Name	Goals
2009	DIV2 Central-East	22	9	5	8	29	33	32	6th				
2010	DIV2 North	30	13	10	7	41	30	49	4th				
2011	DIV2 North	30	14	4	12	46	46	46	6th				
2012	DIV2 North	34	9	5	20	35	64	32	15th				
2013	DIV2 Central-West	24	7	4	13	27	42	25	10th				
2014	DIV2 Central-West	26	12	6	8	42	38	42	5th				
2015	DIV2 North	26	7	11	8	23	29	32	9th	Not enter	R2		
2016	DIV2 Central	20	13	2	5	40	22	41	3rd	Not Enter	QR2	Ousmanou Mohamadou	14
2017	T3 Upper	26	1	6	19	14	57	9	14th	Not Enter	QR1	Jang Gyu-hyeon, Enjo Kensuke	4
2018	T4 North	18	6	3	9	21	30	21	5th	QR	QR1	Basam Radwan Mahmoud Mohaned Afify	6
2019	T4 North	27	11	4	12	47	46	37	7th	R2	QRP	(Thailand) Kongphob Kamasit	13

Champions	Runners-up	Third place	Promoted	Relegated

- P = Played
- W = Games won
- D = Games drawn
- L = Games lost
- F = Goals for
- A = Goals against
- Pts = Points
- Pos = Final position
- QR1 = First Qualifying Round
- QR2 = Second Qualifying Round
- R1 = Round 1
- R2 = Round 2
- R3 = Round 3
- R4 = Round 4
- R5 = Round 5
- R6 = Round 6
- QF = Quarter-finals
- SF = Semi-finals
- RU = Runners-up
- W = Winners
