= Nakhon Sawan F.C. =

Thai football club

Nakhon Sawan นครสวรรค์ เอฟซี
- Full name: Nakhon Sawan Football Club สโมสรฟุตบอลจังหวัดนครสวรรค์
- Nicknames: The Red Lions; Pak-Nam-Po
- Founded: 1999; 27 years ago
- Ground: Nakhon Sawan Province Stadium; Nakhon Sawan, Thailand
- Capacity: 15,000
- Chairman: Pinyo Niroj
- Manager: Somjed rodnarai
- League: Thailand Semi-pro League
- 2023: 3rd (Northern Region)
Home colours	Away colours

Nakhon Sawan Football Club (Thai: สโมสรฟุตบอลจังหวัดนครสวรรค์) is a Thai semi-professional football club based in the northern Nakhon Sawan province. The club currently plays in the Thailand Semi-pro League Northern Region.

Nakon Sawan have won the now defunct Provincial League twice in 2001 and 2003.

== History ==
Nakhon Sawan F.C. was founded in 1999. In the year 2000, the club played in the Thailand Provincial League. The club then succeeded as winning the championship in 2001 and 2003 season. However, the profits were not of great value because the champion of this league was not officially recognized as a champion of Thailand. After the inclusion of the Provincial League in 2007, in the league system of the Thai Football Association, the club played in the Thailand Division 1 League. In the first year of the club even reached seventh place in the group, stood in 15th place with one year later on the relegation zone.

At the beginning of the 2009 season, Bangkok Bank FC withdrew from the league before the season began. FAT therefore decided that to fill the league with 16 teams, they would run a pre-season competition featuring the 4 relegated clubs from the Thailand Division 1 League 2008 season. Nakhon was one of these clubs. Nakhon then went on to the play-off final where they lost 4–0 to Thai Honda FC and would have to start the 2009 season in Division 2.

Further to the 2009 league season, Nakhon Sawan were allowed to enter the first Division due to the withdrawal of the Army Welfare Department side that were promoted from Division 2 in the previous season.

The Red Lions finished sixth in 2010 Thai Division 2 League Northern Region.

== Honours ==
=== Domestic leagues ===
- Provincial League
  - Winners (2) : 2001, 2003

== Stadium and locations ==
Coordinates	Location	Stadium	Year
15°42′36″N 100°06′24″E	Nakhon Sawan	Nakhon Sawan Province Stadium	2007–2008
15°44′32″N 100°07′56″E	Nakhon Sawan	Nakhon Sawan Sports School Stadium	2009
15°42′36″N 100°06′24″E	Nakhon Sawan	Nakhon Sawan Province Stadium	2010–2014
15°44′32″N 100°07′56″E	Nakhon Sawan	Nakhon Sawan Sports School Stadium	2015
15°42′36″N 100°06′24″E	Nakhon Sawan	Nakhon Sawan Province Stadium	2016–2017

== Season by season record ==
Season	League									FA Cup	League Cup	Top goalscorer	
Season	Division	P	W	D	L	F	A	Pts	Pos	FA Cup	League Cup	Name	Goals
1999–2000	Pro League	22	11	4	7	34	23	37	5th				
2001	Pro League	22	14	5	3	46	17	47	1st				
2002	Pro League	10	6	2	2	12	8	20	1st				
2003	Pro League	22	13	7	2	37	16	46	1st				
2004	Pro League	18	10	5	3	34	20	35	2nd				
2005	Pro League	22	10	8	4	33	18	38	4th				
2006	Pro League	30	14	9	7	42	28	51	4th				
2007	DIV1	22	6	11	5	26	30	29	7th				
2008	DIV1	30	5	8	17	26	47	23	15th				
2009	DIV1	30	1	6	23	34	122	9	16th				
2010	DIV2 North	30	13	7	10	46	31	46	6th				
2011	DIV2 North	30	13	7	10	43	36	46	5th				
2012	DIV2 North	34	21	6	7	58	28	69	4th				
2013	DIV2 North	30	13	10	7	37	32	49	6th				
2014	DIV2 North	26	11	7	8	41	40	40	7th				
2015	DIV2 North	26	4	5	17	27	47	17	13th	Not Enter	1st Qualification		
2016	DIV2 Central	20	5	9	6	16	21	24	6th	Not Enter	R1		
2017	T4 North	24	7	4	13	29	36	25	6th	Not Enter	QR1	Authen Lekrat	11
2018	T4 North	18	4	2	12	15	28	14	6th	Not Enter	QR2	Jirawat Janphong	4
2019	TA Northern								Not Enter	Not Enter			
2020 - 2021	Request for Postponement												
2022	TA Northern								Not Enter	Not Enter			

Champions	Runners-up	Promoted	Relegated

== Players ==
=== Current squad ===
Note: Flags indicate national team as defined under FIFA eligibility rules; some limited exceptions apply. Players may hold more than one non-FIFA nationality.

No.	Pos.	Nation	Player
1	GK	THA	Apiwat Chaolumboa
5	DF	THA	Tiwa Nueaket
7	FW	THA	Jirawat Janpong
8	MF	THA	Anon Thawanon
9	FW	THA	Kritchaphon Ruamrua
11	MF	THA	Yuttapong Innoi
12	FW	THA	Piyapong Phukhang
13	DF	THA	Kritsada Hasap
14	MF	THA	Suriya Pongpueng
17	MF	THA	Chaiwat Hiranpit

No.	Pos.	Nation	Player
18	GK	THA	Wittaya Nanta
19	DF	THA	Apichart Sukrin
22	FW	THA	Sunchai Singsom
23	DF	THA	Khemmathat Burirat
24	DF	THA	Wisut Boonmee (captain)
25	GK	THA	Aekkachai Poonsri
30	MF	THA	Montri Promsawad
32	DF	THA	Saharat Kaeosangsai
34	MF	THA	Tossapoan Anupat
40	FW	THA	Saran Pimkote
