= Nan Provincial Administrative Organization Stadium =

Stadium in Nan Province, Thailand

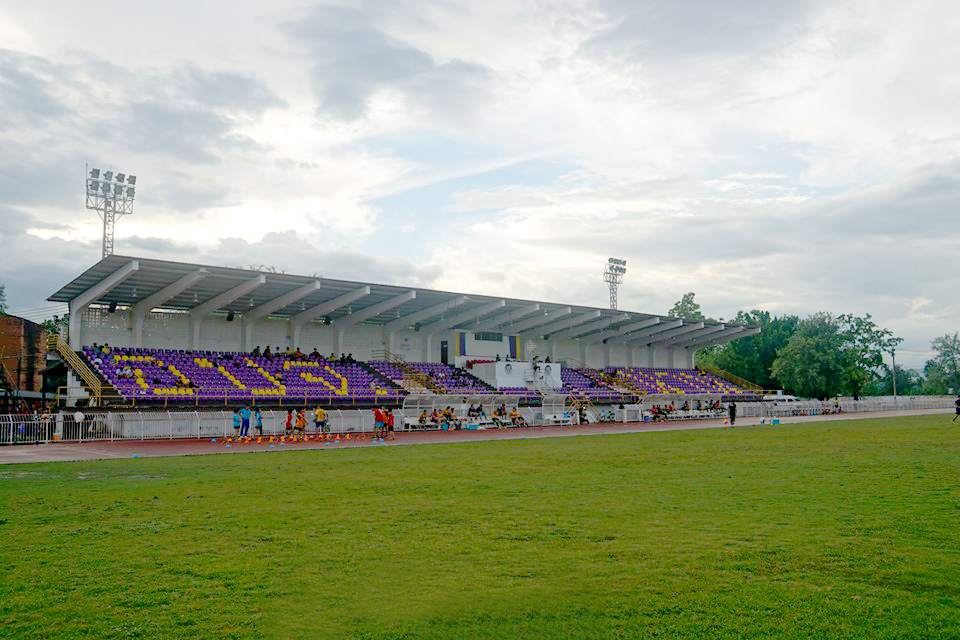
- Interactive map of Nan Provincial Administrative Organization Stadium
- Location: Nan, Thailand
- Coordinates: 18°47′33″N 100°46′30″E
- Capacity: 2,500
- Surface: Grass

Tenant
- Nan F.C.

Nan Provincial Administrative Organization Stadium or Nan Province Stadium (Thai: สนามกีฬา อบจ.น่าน หรือ สนามกีฬา จ.น่าน) is a multi-purpose stadium in Nan Province, Thailand. It is currently used mostly for football matches and is the home stadium of Nan F.C. The stadium holds 2,500 people.
