= Singburi Province Stadium =

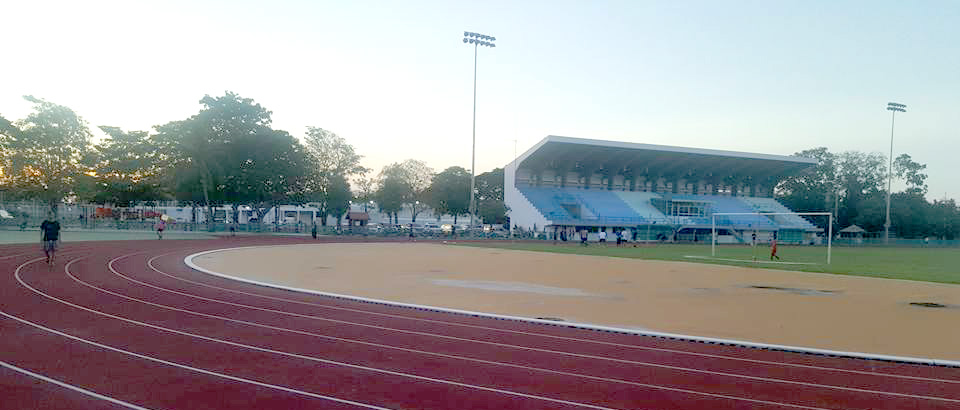
- Interactive map of Singburi Province Stadium
- Location: Sing Buri, Thailand
- Coordinates: 14°53′40″N 100°24′37″E
- Capacity: 3,449
- Surface: Grass

Tenant
- Singburi F.C. 2010-2012

Singburi Province Stadium (Thai: สนามกีฬาจังหวัดสิงห์บุรี) is a multi-purpose stadium in Sing Buri Province, Thailand. It is currently used mostly for football matches and is the home stadium of Singburi F.C. The stadium holds 3,449 people.
