= Rongseemaechaithanachotiwat Phayao F.C. =

Thai football club

Rongseemaechaithanachotiwat Phayao F.C. โรงสีแม่ใจธนะโชติวัฒน์ พะเยา เอฟ.ซี.
- Full name: Rongseemaechaithanachotiwat Phayao Football Club สโมสรฟุตบอลโรงสีแม่ใจธนะโชติวัฒน์ พะเยา
- Nicknames: The Mountain Eagles (อินทรีแห่งขุนเขา)
- Short name: RPFC
- Founded: 2022; 4 years ago, as Rongseemaechaithanachotiwat Football Club
- Ground: Phayao Provincial Administrative Organization Stadium; Phayao, Thailand
- Capacity: 6,503
- Chairman: Worrawit Pingmuang
- Head Coach: Pichitphong Choeichiu
- League: Thai League 3
- 2023–24: Thai League 3, 4th of 11 in the Northern region
Home colours	Away colours

Rongseemaechaithanachotiwat Phayao Football Club (Thai สโมสรฟุตบอลโรงสีแม่ใจธนะโชติวัฒน์ พะเยา), is a Thai professional football club based in Mueang, Phayao, Thailand. The club is currently playing in the Thai League 3 Northern region.

== Timeline ==
History of events of Rongseemaechaithanachotiwat Phayao Football Club

Year	Important events
2010	The club is formed as Rongseemaechaithanachotiwat Phayao Football Club, nicknamed The Shrimps; Club admitted to the Regional League Northern Division; Home games to be played at Phayao Stadium; Issared Beidtaku named as the first ever coach of Phayao

In 2022, Rongseemaechaithanachotiwat Phayao competed in the Thai League 3 for the 2022–23 season. It is their 1st season in the professional league. The club started the season with a 0–2 home defeat to Phitsanulok and they ended the season with a 1–3 away defeat to Phitsanulok. The club has finished 3rd place in the league of the Northern region.

== Stadium and locations ==
Phayao Provincial Administrative Organization Stadium (Phayao PAO. Stadium)

== Season by season record ==
Season	League									FA Cup	League Cup	T3 Cup	Top goalscorer	
Season	Division	P	W	D	L	F	A	Pts	Pos	FA Cup	League Cup	T3 Cup	Name	Goals
Rongseemaechaithanachotiwat Phayao F.C.
2022	TA North	2	2	0	0	8	1	6	2nd	Opted out	Ineligible			
2022–23	T3 North	22	11	5	6	40	32	38	3rd	Opted out	Opted out		(Thailand) Saran Sridet	16
2023–24	T3 North	20	8	7	5	28	24	31	4th	Opted out	Opted out	Opted out	(Thailand) Phitsanusak Chuenbua-in	5

Champions	Runners-up	Third Place	Promoted	Relegated

- P = Played
- W = Games won
- D = Games drawn
- L = Games lost
- F = Goals for
- A = Goals against
- Pts = Points
- Pos = Final position
- QR1 = First Qualifying Round
- QR2 = Second Qualifying Round
- R1 = Round 1
- R2 = Round 2
- R3 = Round 3
- R4 = Round 4
- R5 = Round 5
- R6 = Round 6
- QF = Quarter-finals
- SF = Semi-finals
- RU = Runners-up
- W = Winners
