= Uttaradit Province Stadium =

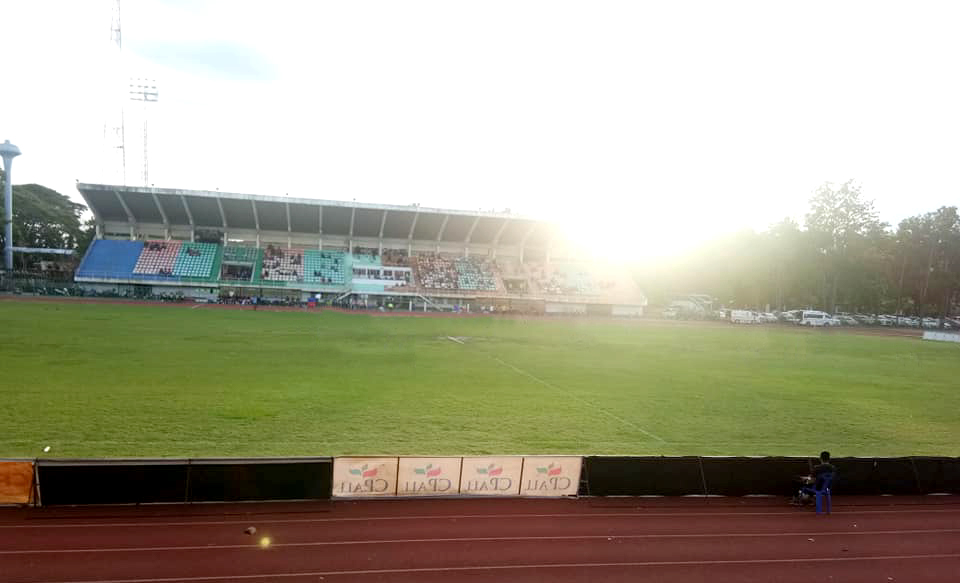
- Interactive map of Uttaradit Province Stadium
- Location: Uttaradit, Thailand
- Coordinates: 17°36′34″N 100°06′37″E
- Capacity: 3,245
- Surface: Grass

Tenant
- Uttaradit F.C. 2010-2011

Uttaradit Province Stadium (Thai: สนามกีฬาจังหวัดอุตรดิตถ์ หรือ สนามกีฬาหมอนไม้) is a multi-purpose stadium in Uttaradit Province, Thailand. It is currently used mostly for football matches and is the home stadium of Uttaradit F.C. The stadium holds 3,245 people.
