= Phitsanulok PAO. Stadium =

Multi-purpose stadium in Thailand

Phitsanulok Provincial Administrative Organization Stadium
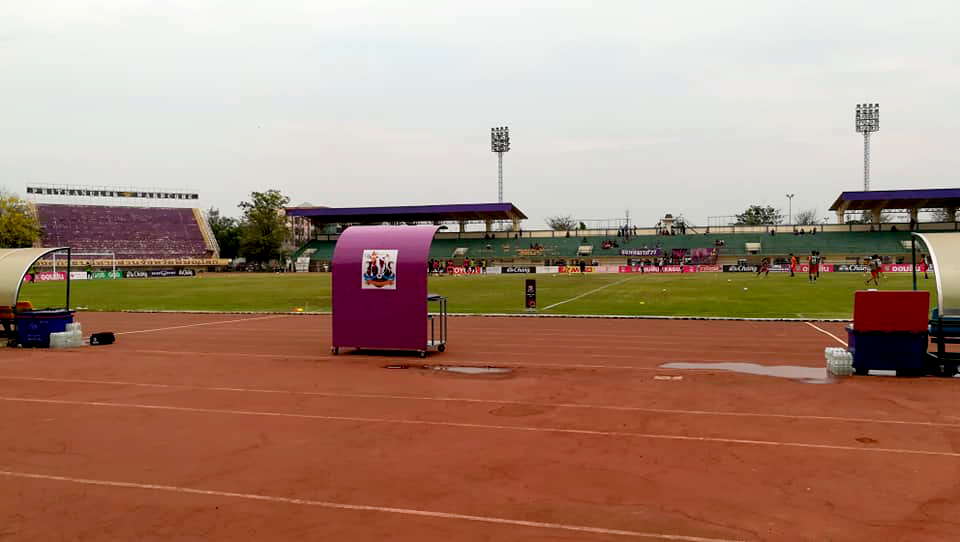
- Interactive map of Phitsanulok Provincial Administrative Organization Stadium
- Location: Phitsanulok, Thailand
- Coordinates: 16°50′47″N 100°15′52″E
- Capacity: 3,066
- Surface: Grass

Tenant
- Phitsanulok F.C. 2010-2011

Phitsanulok Provincial Administrative Organization Stadium (Thai: สนาม อบจ.พิษณุโลก หรือ สนามกีฬาจ.พิษณุโลก) is a multi-purpose stadium in Phitsanulok Province, Thailand. It is currently used mostly for football matches and is the home stadium of Phitsanulok F.C. The stadium holds 3,066 people.
