= 2013 Regional League Division 2 Northern Region =

Regional League Northern Region
- Season: 2013

2013 Regional League Division 2 Northern Region is the fifth season of the League competition since its establishment in 2009. It is in the third tier of the Thai football league system.

== Changes from last season ==
=== Team changes ===
==== Promoted clubs ====
No club was promoted to the Thai Division 1 League. Last years league champions Chiangmai, runners up Phitsanulok failed to qualify from the 2012 Regional League Division 2 championship pool.

==== Relocated clubs ====
Paknampho NSRU have all been moved into the Bangkok Area Division 2013
Singburi have all been moved into the Central-West Region 2013

== Stadium and locations ==
Locations of the 2013 Regional League Division 2 Northern Region Teams

Team	Location	Stadium	Capacity	Ref.
Phitsanulok	Phitsanulok	Phitsanulok Provincial Administrative Organization Stadium	3,000	
Chiangmai	Chiang Mai	700th Anniversary Stadium	25,000	
Lamphun Warriors	Lamphun	Mae-Guang Stadium	3,000	
Phichit	Phichit	Phichit Stadium	20,000	
Uttaradit	Uttaradit	Uttaradit Province Stadium	3,250	
Nakhon Sawan	Nakhon Sawan	Nakhon Sawan Province Stadium	15000	
Kamphaeng Phet	Kamphaeng Phet	Cha-Kangrao Stadium	2,600	
Uthai Thani Forest	Uthai Thani Nakhon Sawan	Uthai Thani Province Stadium Latyaowitthayakhom School	4,500 ?	
Tak	Tak	Tak Provincial Administrative Organization Stadium	1,100	
Lampang	Lampang	Lampang Province Stadium	4,700	
Phrae United	Phrae	Phrae Provincial Administrative Organization Stadium	4,500	
Sukhothai	Sukhothai	Sukhothai Institute of Physical Education Stadium Bunsom martin Stadium	4,500	
Phetchabun	Phetchabun	Phetchabun Institute of Physical Education Stadium	2000	
Chiangrai City	Chiangrai	Chiangrai Province Stadium	5,000	
Phayao	Phayao	Phayao Province Stadium	6,000	
Nan	Nan	Rajamangala University of Technology Nan Campus Stadium	2,500	

=== Personnel and sponsoring ===
Note: Flags indicate national team as has been defined under FIFA eligibility rules. Players may hold more than one non-FIFA nationality.

Team	Kit manufacturer	Shirt sponsor	Captain	Head coach
Phitsanulok	Winner	Isuzu, Hock An Tueng Group & Chang		
Chiangmai	-	Muang Thai, Chiangmai Ram Hospital, Leo Beer & Singha		
Lamphun Warriors	Triple Sport	Yamaha, Chang & Betagro		
Phichit	FBT	Red Bull & Leo Beer		
Uttaradit	Ego Sport	Ego Sport		
Nakhon Sawan	FBT	Leo Beer		
Kamphaeng Phet	Kela	Bangkok Airways, AIA & Chang		
Uthai Thani	FBT	-		
Tak	Mawin	Fairway & Mawin		
Lampang	Kela	Toyota, Leo & S.Sommee		
Phrae	Kool	Leo Beer & Phrae Sila		
Sukhothai	Mawin	3K Battery, Bangkok Airways & Chang		
Phetchabun	Ego Sports	Leo Beer		
Chiangrai	FBT	-		
Phayao	Kela	GS Battery & Chang		
Nan	Deffo	Leo Beer		

== League table ==
Pos	Team	Pld	W	D	L	GF	GA	GD	Pts	Qualification
1	Chiangmai (C, Q)	30	21	6	3	70	20	+50	69	Champions League Round
2	Phitsanulok (Q)	30	18	9	3	51	16	+35	63	Champions League Round
3	Sukhothai (Q)	30	18	6	6	50	28	+22	60	Champions League Round Qualifying play-off
4	Phichit	30	17	8	5	53	30	+23	59	
5	Lampang	30	16	5	9	42	30	+12	53	
6	Nakhon Sawan	30	13	10	7	37	32	+5	49	
7	Phayao	30	13	5	12	37	30	+7	44	
8	Lamphun Warrior	30	12	7	11	34	30	+4	43	
9	Phrae United	30	12	6	12	34	34	0	42	
10	Chiangrai City	30	11	8	11	32	32	0	41	
11	Uthai Thani Forest	30	9	9	12	25	29	−4	36	
12	Nan	30	9	7	14	35	43	−8	34	
13	Kamphaeng Phet	30	6	5	19	16	40	−24	23	
14	Uttaradit	30	4	10	16	22	44	−22	22	
15	Phetchabun	30	3	8	19	21	54	−33	17	
16	Tak	30	2	2	26	14	81	−67	8	

Source: ^{[usurped]}
Rules for classification: 1) points; 2) head-to-head points; 3) head-to-head goal difference; 4) head-to-head goals scored; 5) goal difference; 6) number of goals scored.
(C) Champions; (Q) Qualified for the phase indicated
