= 2012 Regional League Division 2 Northern Region =

Regional League Northern Division
- Season: 2012
- Champions: Chiangmai; 2nd Title
- Matches played: 306
- Goals scored: 784 (2.56 per match)
- Biggest home win: Chiangmai 6-0 Phetchabun (5 May 2012); Chiangmai 6-0 Nan (5 August 2012)
- Biggest away win: Tak 1-7 Paknampho NSRU (14 April 2012); Tak 0-6 Chiangmai (11 August 2012)
- Highest scoring: Chiangrai 4-7 Nakhon Sawan (22 July 2012) (11 goals)

2012 Regional League Division 2 Northern Region is the fourth season of the league competition since its establishment in 2009. It is in the third tier of the Thai football league system.

== Changes from last season ==
=== Team changes ===
==== Promoted clubs ====
No club was promoted to the Thai Division 1 League. Last year's league champions, Phitsanulok, and runners up, Lamphun Warrior, failed to qualify from the 2011 Regional League Division 2 championship pool.

==== Relegated clubs ====
Chiangmai were relegated from the 2011 Thai Division 1 League.

==== Relocated clubs ====
Paknampho NSRU relocated to the Regional League Northern Division from the Regional League Bangkok Area Division.

== Stadium and locations ==
Locations of the Regional League North Region Teams

Team	Location	Stadium	Capacity	Ref.
Phitsanulok	Phitsanulok	Phitsanulok PAO. Stadium	3,000	
Chiangmai	Chiang Mai	700th Anniversary Stadium	25,000	
Lamphun Warriors	Lamphun	Mae-Guang Stadium	3,000	
Phichit	Phichit	Phichit Provincial Stadium	20,000	
Uttaradit-Morseng	Uttaradit	Uttaradit Province Stadium	3,250	
Nakhon Sawan	Nakhon Sawan	Nakhon Sawan Province Stadium	15000	
Kamphaeng Phet	Kamphaeng Phet	Cha-Kangrao Stadium	2,600	
Uthai Thani Forest	Uthai Thani	Uthai Thani Province Stadium	4,500	
Singburi	Singburi	Singburi Province Stadium	3,500	
Lampang	Lampang	Nong Kra Ting Stadium	4,700	
Phrae United	Phrae	Thunghong Subdistrict municipality Stadium	4,500	
Sukhothai	Sukhothai	Bunsom martin Stadium	4,500	
Paknampho NSRU	Nakhon Sawan	Nakhon Sawan Sports School Stadium	2000	
Phetchabun	Phetchabun	Institute of Physical Education Phetchabun Campus Stadium	2000	
Tak	Tak	Rajamangala University of Technology Tak Campus Stadium Tak Provincial Administrative Organization Stadium (2)	? 3,100	
Chiangrai	Chiangrai	Chiangrai Rajabhat University Stadium (1) Chiangrai PAO. Stadium (2)	? 5,000	
Phayao	Phayao	Phayao University Stadium Phayao Provincial Administrative Organization Stadium	? 6,000	
Nan	Nan	Rajamangala University of Technology Nan Campus Stadium	2,500	

== League table ==
Pos	Team	Pld	W	D	L	GF	GA	GD	Pts	Qualification
1	Chiangmai (C, Q)	34	24	8	2	78	30	+48	80	Champions League Round
2	Phitsanulok (Q)	34	21	11	2	51	18	+33	74	Champions League Round
3	Paknampho NSRU (Q)	34	21	9	4	71	30	+41	72	Champions League Round
4	Nakhon Sawan	34	21	6	7	58	28	+30	69	
5	Phrae United	34	15	14	5	44	24	+20	59	
6	Kamphaeng Phet	34	14	9	11	43	33	+10	51	
7	Uttaradit-Morseng	34	13	10	11	53	44	+9	49	
8	Phichit	34	13	9	12	45	38	+7	48	
9	Lamphun Warrior	34	13	8	13	45	38	+7	47	
10	Uthai Thani Forest	34	12	8	14	47	42	+5	44	
11	Phayao	34	8	17	9	31	33	−2	41	
12	Nan	34	10	11	13	33	40	−7	41	
13	Lampang	34	9	10	15	38	42	−4	37	
14	Sukhothai	34	9	10	15	23	37	−14	37	
15	Singburi	34	9	5	20	35	64	−29	32	
16	Phetchabun	34	7	8	19	27	65	−38	29	
17	Chiangrai	34	3	6	25	34	72	−38	15	
18	Tak	34	3	3	28	28	107	−79	12	

Rules for classification: 1) points; 2) head-to-head points; 3) head-to-head goal difference; 4) head-to-head goals scored; 5) goal difference; 6) number of goals scored.
(C) Champions; (Q) Qualified for the phase indicated
