= 2010 Regional League Division 2 Northern Region =

Regional League Northern Region
- Season: 2010
- Champions: Chiangmai; 1st Title
- Matches: 240
- Goals: 679 (2.83 per match)
- Biggest home win: Chainat 7-0 Phayao (14 February 2010)
- Biggest away win: Uthai Thani 0-5 Phichit (29 May 2010)
- Highest scoring: Phayao 5-6 Chiangrai (18 September 2010) (11 goals)

2010 Regional League Division 2 Northern Region is the second season of the League competition since its establishment in 2009. It is in the third tier of the Thai football league system.

The league has been expanded from 11 clubs in 2009 to 16 clubs this season. The league winners and runners up will qualify for the 2010 Regional League Division 2 championship stage.

== Changes from last season ==
=== Team changes ===
==== Promoted clubs ====
Chiangrai United were promoted to the 2010 Thai Division 1 League after coming 2nd in the 2009 Regional League Division 2 championship pool.

==== Relegated clubs ====
Nakhon Sawan were relegated from the 2009 Thai Division 1 League after finishing the season in 16th place.

==== Renamed clubs ====
Phrae renamed Phrae United Chiangmai United renamed Chiangmai

==== Expansion clubs ====
Chiangrai, Lampang, Phayao and Uthai Thani joined the newly expanded league setup.

== Stadium and locations ==
Locations of the Regional League North Teams

Team	Location	Stadium	Capacity	Ref.
Chainat	Chainat	Chai Nat Provincial Stadium	?	
Chiangmai	Chiangmai	700th Anniversary Stadium	25,000	
Chiangrai	Chiangrai	Chiangrai Provincial Administrative Organization Stadium	5,000	
Kamphaeng Phet	Kamphaeng Phet	Kamphaeng Phet Province Stadium	2,580	
Lampang	Lampang	Lampang Province Stadium	5,500	
Nakhon Sawan	Nakhon Sawan	Nakhon Sawan Province Stadium	?	
Phayao	Phayao	Phayao Province Stadium	?	
Phetchabun	Phetchabun	Phetchabun Institute of Physical Education Stadium	?	
Phichit	Phichit	Phichit Province Stadium	?	
Phitsanulok	Phitsanulok	Phitsanulok Province Stadium	?	
Phrae United	Phrae	Phrae Provincial Administrative Organization Stadium	4,500	
Singburi	Singburi	Singburi Province Stadium	?	
Sukhothai	Sukhothai	Sukhothai Province Stadium	5,500	
Tak	Tak	Tak Province Stadium	5,500	
Uthai Thani Forest	Uthai Thani	Uthai Thani Province Stadium	4,477	
Uttaradit-Morseng	Uttaradit	Uttaradit Rajabhat University Stadium Uttaradit Province Stadium	? 3,245	

== League table ==
Pos	Team	Pld	W	D	L	GF	GA	GD	Pts	Qualification
1	Chiangmai (C)	30	26	1	3	65	14	+51	79	Champions League Round
2	Chainat	30	22	5	3	54	13	+41	71	Champions League Round
3	Phichit	30	19	6	5	73	25	+48	63	Champions League Round
4	Singburi	30	13	10	7	41	30	+11	49	
5	Phrae United	30	12	12	6	31	19	+12	48	
6	Nakhon Sawan	30	13	7	10	46	31	+15	46 (Note: NSW 2–0 PSL; PSL 1–0 NSW)	
7	Phitsanulok	30	13	7	10	36	27	+9	46	
8	Phetchabun	30	12	7	11	47	35	+12	43	
9	Sukhothai	30	12	6	12	44	51	−7	42	
10	Uttaradit-Morseng	30	11	3	16	40	52	−12	36	
11	Chiangrai	30	8	4	18	43	64	−21	28 (Note: CHR 1–0 KPP; KPP 3–2 CHR)	
12	Kamphaeng Phet	30	7	7	16	31	54	−23	28	
13	Lampang	30	7	6	17	33	48	−15	27	
14	Tak	30	6	6	18	29	68	−39	24	
15	Uthai Thani Forest	30	6	4	20	32	69	−37	22	
16	Phayao	30	6	3	21	34	79	−45	21	

Rules for classification: 1) points; 2) head-to-head points; 3) head-to-head goal difference; 4) head-to-head goals scored; 5) goal difference; 6) number of goals scored.
(C) Champions
Notes:

2010 Thai Division 2 League
Northern Region winners

1st title

== Results ==
Home \ Away	CHN	CHM	CHR	KPP	LMP	NSW	PHY	PCB	PCT	PSL	PHR	SBR	SKT	TAK	UTN	UTD
Chainat		1–0	2–0	2–2	2–0	0–2	7–0	2–0	0–1	2–1	2–0	3–0	2–1	2–0	2–0	3–1
Chiangmai	1–2		1–0	2–0	1–0	2–1	6–0	2–1	2–0	4–0	0–0	2–0	4–0	6–1	1–0	2–0
Chiangrai	0–1	1–4		1–0	2–2	4–1	2–1	2–3	0–2	2–1	0–1	2–3	1–3	5–1	2–1	0–1
Kamphaeng Phet	0–1	0–2	3–2		3–1	1–1	2–3	1–1	0–0	0–0	0–3	0–0	1–0	2–1	1–1	3–2
Lampang	0–1	1–2	1–1	1–0		2–1	1–0	0–1	1–2	1–1	1–3	2–3	2–1	2–0	2–0	2–3
Nakhon Sawan	0–1	0–2	1–1	2–0	3–1		2–0	1–1	1–0	2–0	1–1	1–2	2–2	2–2	0–1	5–0
Phayao	0–0	1–4	5–6	4–2	1–2	1–0		1–2	3–4	0–2	1–1	2–2	0–4	1–0	1–2	3–2
Phetchabun	1–1	0–1	2–0	3–1	3–2	0–1	2–0		2–2	1–1	0–1	2–4	5–1	3–0	6–1	1–0
Phichit	0–0	2–1	6–0	5–3	3–0	0–1	5–0	2–0		0–1	0–0	2–0	4–3	7–1	6–1	1–2
Phitsanulok	0–1	0–1	3–2	4–0	1–0	1–0	0–1	2–1	0–0		0–0	1–1	3–1	2–1	2–0	1–0
Phrae United	1–0	1–2	1–1	2–0	2–0	2–1	3–0	0–0	1–3	2–0		1–0	0–0	0–1	0–0	2–1
Singburi	0–0	0–1	4–1	4–0	2–1	0–0	4–1	1–0	1–1	0–0	0–0		0–1	2–1	2–1	2–1
Sukhothai	1–5	0–2	3–1	2–0	2–2	0–2	3–1	0–0	1–4	2–1	1–1	1–0		2–0	3–3	2–1
Tak	0–3	2–3	2–1	2–1	1–1	1–3	2–1	1–4	0–4	1–4	2–2	1–1	0–2		2–0	0–0
Uthai Thani Forest	1–4	0–2	0–2	2–3	1–1	1–4	5–1	2–1	0–5	0–4	1–0	0–2	0–1	2–3		6–1
Uttaradit-Morseng	0–2	0–2	5–1	0–2	2–1	2–5	2–1	2–1	0–2	1–0	1–0	1–1	4–1	0–0	5–0	

Updated to match(es) played on unknown. Source: Football Association of Thailand website
Legend: Blue = home team win; Yellow = draw; Red = away team win.
