= 2014 Regional League Division 2 Northern Region =

Regional League Northern Region
- Season: 2014
- Champions: Sukhothai

2014 Regional League Division 2 Northern Region is the sixth season of the League competition since its establishment in 2009. It is in the third tier of the Thai football league system.

== Changes from last season ==
=== Team changes ===
==== Promoted clubs ====
Chiangmai and Phitsanulok were promoted to the 2014 Thai Division 1 League.

==== Renamed clubs ====
- Tak renamed Tak United.

== Stadium and locations ==
Locations of the 2014 Regional League Division 2 Northern Region Teams

Team	Location	Stadium	Capacity	Ref.
Lamphun Warriors	Lamphun	Mae Guang Stadium	3,000	
Phichit	Phichit	Phichit Provincial Stadium	20,000	
Uttaradit	Uttaradit	Uttaradit Province Stadium	3,250	
Nakhon Sawan	Nakhon Sawan	Nakhon Sawan Province Stadium	15,000	
Kamphaeng Phet	Kamphaeng Phet	Cha-Kangrao Rimping Stadium	2,600	
Uthai Thani Forest	Uthai Thani	Uthai Thani Province Stadium	4,500	
Tak	Tak	Tak PAO. Stadium	1,100	
Lampang	Lampang	Nong Kra Ting Stadium	4,700	
Phrae United	Phrae	Thunghong Subdistrict municipality Stadium	4,500	
Sukhothai	Sukhothai	Thung Thalay Luang Stadium	8,000	
Phetchabun	Phetchabun	Institute of Physical Education Phetchabun Campus Stadium	2000	
Chiangrai City	Chiangrai	Chiangrai Province Stadium	5,000	
Phayao	Phayao	Phayao Provincial Administrative Organization Stadium	6,000	
Nan	Nan	Nan Province Stadium	2,500	

== League table ==
Pos	Team	Pld	W	D	L	GF	GA	GD	Pts	Qualification
1	Sukhothai (C, Q)	26	19	4	3	69	19	+50	61	Champions League Round
2	Phichit (Q)	26	17	4	5	65	26	+39	55	Champions League Round
3	Phayao	26	15	7	4	53	29	+24	52	
4	Phrae United	26	13	9	4	43	30	+13	48	
5	Chiangrai City	26	14	5	7	52	31	+21	47	
6	Lampang	26	11	10	5	35	18	+17	43	
7	Nakhon Sawan	26	11	7	8	41	40	+1	40	
8	Lamphun Warrior	26	7	12	7	29	27	+2	33	
9	Uttaradit	26	8	5	13	22	34	−12	29	
10	Nan	26	6	9	11	31	40	−9	27	
11	Kamphaeng Phet	26	6	6	14	23	44	−21	24	
12	Phetchabun	26	5	6	15	31	46	−15	21	
13	Uthai Thani	26	3	8	15	25	60	−35	17	
14	Tak	26	0	1	25	22	95	−73	1	

Rules for classification: 1) points; 2) head-to-head points; 3) head-to-head goal difference; 4) head-to-head goals scored; 5) goal difference; 6) number of goals scored.
(C) Champions; (Q) Qualified for the phase indicated
