= 2016 Regional League Division 2 Northern Region =

Regional League Northern Region
- Season: 2016
- Champions: Nong Bua Pitchaya
- Relegated: Phetchabun
- Matches: 132
- Goals: 355 (2.69 per match)
- Top goalscorer: Jamal Amidu; Mathias E. Recio (13 Goals)
- Biggest home win: Nan 6–0 Phetchabun (24 April 2016)
- Biggest away win: Tak City 1–5 Phayao (4 June 2016)
- Highest scoring: Nong Bua Pitchaya 5–3 Phrae (26 March 2016); Nan 3–5 Loei City (14 August 2016)
- Longest winning run: 3 Matches; Kamphaeng Phet; Nong Bua Pitchaya; Phayao
- Longest unbeaten run: 9 Matches; Lamphun Warrior

2016 Regional League Division 2 Northern Division is the eighth season of the League competition since its establishment in 2009. It is in the third tier of the Thai football league system.

== Changes from last season ==
=== Team changes ===
==== Promoted clubs ====
- Lampang were promoted to the 2016 Thai Division 1 League.

==== Relegated clubs ====
- Phichit were relegated from the 2015 Thai Division 1 League.

==== Withdrawn clubs ====
- Lopburi have withdrawn from the 2016 campaign.

==== Moved clubs ====
- Loei City R-Airlines and Nong Bua Pitchaya were moved from the North Eastern Region 2015.
- Nakhon Sawan were moved into the Central Region 2016.
- Phichit authorize to Ayutthaya Warrior in Central Region 2016

== Stadium and locations ==
Locations of the 2016 Regional League Division 2 Northern Region Teams

Team	Location	Stadium	Capacity	Ref.
Lamphun Warriors	Lamphun	Mae-Guang Stadium	3,000	
Uttaradit	Uttaradit	Mon-mai Stadium	3,250	
Loei City R-Airlines	Loei	Loei Riverside Stadium	3,628	
Nong Bua Pitchaya	Nong Bua Lam Phu	Nong Bua Lamphu Province Stadium	6,053	
Kamphaeng Phet	Kamphaeng Phet	Cha Kung Rao Stadium	2,600	
Tak City	Tak	Tak Provincial Administrative Organization Stadium	1,100	
Phrae United	Phrae	Thunghong Subdistrict municipality Stadium	4,500	
Phetchabun	Phetchabun	IPE Phetchabun Stadium	2000	
Phitsanulok TSY	Phitsanulok	Phitsanulok PAO. Stadium	3,066	
Chiangrai City	Chiang Rai	Chiangrai Province Stadium	5,000	
Phayao	Phayao	Phayao PAO. Stadium	6,000	
Nan	Nan	Nan PAO. Stadium	2,500	

== League table ==
Pos	Team	Pld	W	D	L	GF	GA	GD	Pts	Promotion or relegation
1	Nong Bua Pitchaya (C, Q)	22	12	7	3	48	22	+26	43	Qualification to Champions League Round and Promotion to Thai League Championship
2	Kamphaeng Phet (Q)	22	11	9	2	26	15	+11	42 (Note: KAM 1–0 PHR ; PHR 2–2 KAM)	Qualification to Champions League Round and Promotion to Thai League Championship
3	Phrae United (P)	22	13	3	6	32	25	+7	42	Promotion to Thai League Championship
4	Phayao (P)	22	11	7	4	35	19	+16	40	Promotion to Thai League Championship
5	Lamphun Warrior (P)	22	10	9	3	32	20	+12	39	Promotion to Thai League Championship
6	Phitsanulok TSY	22	9	8	5	31	26	+5	35	
7	Loei City R-Airlines	22	8	6	8	35	29	+6	30 (Note: LOE 2–1 TAK ; TAK 1–1 LOE)	
8	Tak City	22	8	6	8	31	32	−1	30	
9	Nan	22	4	7	11	33	35	−2	19	
10	Uttaradit	22	4	5	13	25	39	−14	17	
11	Chiangrai City	22	3	3	16	21	48	−27	12	
12	Phetchabun (R)	22	2	4	16	6	45	−39	10	Relegation to Thai Football Division 3

Source: Division 2
Rules for classification: 1) points; 2) head-to-head points; 3) head-to-head goal difference; 4) head-to-head goals scored; 5) goal difference; 6) number of goals scored.
(C) Champions; (P) Promoted; (Q) Qualified for the phase indicated; (R) Relegated

== Results ==
Home \ Away	CRA	KAM	LMP	LOE	NAN	NBL	PHA	PHE	PHT	PHR	UTT	TAK
Chiangrai City		0–2	2–2	1–3	1–3	0–2	0–1	1–0	2–0	1–2	2–1	0–2
Kamphaeng Phet	2–1		0–0	1–0	0–0	0–0	0–0	2–0	1–2	1–0	0–3	2–1
Lamphun Warrior	2–0	1–3		2–0	1–1	0–0	1–0	1–0	0–0	1–0	3–3	4–0
Loei City R-Airlines	5–1	2–2	1–2		4–2	0–1	1–2	2–0	3–2	1–2	1–0	2–1
Nan	2–2	1–2	1–1	3–5		1–2	1–1	6–0	1–2	2–2	2–0	1–2
Nong Bua Pitchaya	4–1	2–2	3–2	1–1	2–1		3–0	5–0	1–1	5–3	3–0	1–1
Phayao	2–1	0–1	1–1	1–0	1–1	1–1		3–0	2–3	2–0	4–2	4–1
Phetchabun	2–1	0–0	1–2	0–0	0–2	0–4	0–0		0–2	0–1	1–0	1–1
Phitsanulok TSY	2–1	0–0	2–2	1–1	2–0	2–1	1–1	2–1		2–3	3–2	0–1
Phrae United	2–1	2–2	2–0	1–0	1–0	2–1	0–2	3–0	1–1		1–0	1–2
Uttaradit	1–1	0–2	0–2	2–2	2–1	1–4	0–2	3–0	2–1	1–2		2–2
Tak City	6–1	0–1	0–2	1–1	2–1	3–2	1–5	4–0	0–0	0–1	0–0	

Updated to match(es) played on 3 September 2016. Source: Division 2
Legend: Blue = home team win; Yellow = draw; Red = away team win.

== Season statistics ==
=== Top scorers ===
As of 3 September 2016.

Rank	Player	Club	Goals
1	(Ghana) Jamal Amidu	Nan	13
1	(Argentina) Mathias E. Recio	Loei City R-Airlines	13
3	(Argentina) Gastón González	Nong Bua Pitchaya	12
4	(Thailand) Tatree Seeha	Nong Bua Pitchaya	11
5	(South Korea) Noh Hyeong-cheol	Uttaradit	10
6	(Thailand) Weerayut Srivichai	Nong Bua Pitchaya	8
6	(Thailand) Jakkaphan Srivichai	Tak City	8
8	(Thailand) Jakkrit Bunkham	Phrae United	7
8	(Thailand) Suphakorn Naknoi	Phitsanulok	7
8	(Nigeria) Shola Jimmy Omotosho	Lamphun Warrior	7
8	(Thailand) Rachen Kulakong	Tak City	7

== See also ==
- 2016 Thai Premier League
- 2016 Thai Division 1 League
- 2016 Regional League Division 2
- 2016 Thai FA Cup
- 2016 Thai League Cup
- 2016 Kor Royal Cup
