= 2014 Regional League Division 2 =

- Season: 2014
- Champions: Prachuap Khiri Khan
- Promoted: Prachuap Khiri Khan; Thai Honda; Sukhothai; Phichit
- Matches: 64
- Goals: 181 (2.83 per match)
- Biggest home win: Ubon UMT 7–1 Maptaphut (26 November 2014)
- Biggest away win: Maptaphut 0–4 Thai Honda (26 October 2014); Maptaphut 0–4 Ubon UMT (8 November 2014)
- Highest scoring: Ubon UMT 3–4 Thai Honda (16 November 2014)
- Longest winning run: 3 games Prachuap Khiri Khan; Phichit; Sukhothai; Thai Honda
- Longest unbeaten run: 8 games Sukhothai
- Longest losing run: 10 games Maptaphut

The 2014 Regional League Division 2 (also known as the AIS League Division 2 for sponsorship reasons) was the 9th season of the Regional League Division 2, it had redirected from the division 2, since its establishment in 2006. The 83 clubs will be divided into 6 groups (regions)

== 2014 Regional League Round All locations ==
Locations of the 2014 Regional League Division 2 All Teams
2014 Regional League Division 2 Bangkok & field Region
2014 Regional League Division 2 Central & Eastern Region
2014 Regional League Division 2 Central & Western Region
2014 Regional League Division 2 Northern Region
2014 Regional League Division 2 North Eastern Region
2014 Regional League Division 2 Southern Region

=== 2014 ===
red Zone:2014 Regional League Division 2 Bangkok Metropolitan Region
Yellow Zone:2014 Regional League Division 2 Central & Eastern Region
Pink Zone:2014 Regional League Division 2 Central & Western Region
Green Zone: 2014 Regional League Division 2 Northern Region
Orange Zone:2014 Regional League Division 2 North Eastern Region
Blue Zone:2014 Regional League Division 2 Southern Region

=== List of qualified teams ===
Bangkok & field (2)

- Thai Honda (Winner)
- BCC Tero (Runner-up)

Central & Eastern (2)

- Prachinburi United (Winner)
- Maptaphut Rayong (Runner-up)

Central & Western (2)

- Hua Hin (Winner)
- Phetchaburi (Runner-up)

Northern (2)

- Sukhothai (Winner)
- Phichit (Runner-up)

North Eastern (2)

- Ubon UMT (Winner)
- Udon Thani (Runner-up)

Southern (2)

- Prachuap Khiri Khan (Winner)
- Satun United (Runner-up)
Football clubs in Bangkok Metropolitan Region

== Champions League round table ==
=== Group A ===
Pos	Team	Pld	W	D	L	GF	GA	GD	Pts	Promotion
1	Prachuap (P)	10	6	1	3	20	14	+6	19	Promotion spot for the 2015 Thai Division 1 League
2	Phichit (P)	10	5	1	4	20	14	+6	16	Promotion spot for the 2015 Thai Division 1 League
3	Udon Thani	10	4	2	4	10	9	+1	14	
4	Hua Hin	10	4	1	5	15	17	−2	13	
5	BCC Tero	10	3	3	4	9	13	−4	12	
6	Prachinburi United	10	4	0	6	11	18	−7	12	

(P) Promoted

=== Group B ===
Pos	Team	Pld	W	D	L	GF	GA	GD	Pts	Promotion
1	Thai Honda (P)	10	7	0	3	20	11	+9	21	Promotion spot for the 2015 Thai Division 1 League
2	Sukhothai (P)	10	6	2	2	16	9	+7	20	Promotion spot for the 2015 Thai Division 1 League
3	Satun United	10	6	2	2	14	6	+8	20	
4	Ubon UMT	10	4	2	4	21	15	+6	14	
5	Phetchaburi	10	4	0	6	12	13	−1	12	
6	Maptaphut Rayong	10	0	0	10	4	33	−29	0	

Rules for classification: 1st points; 2nd head-to-head; 3rd goal difference; 4th goals scored
(P) Promoted

== 3/4 Place ==
First Leg

20 December 2014
18:00 UTC+7

Phichit	3–2	Sukhothai

Phichit Stadium, Phichit

Second Leg

27 December 2014
18:00 UTC+7

Sukhothai	3–1	Phichit

Thung Talay Luang Stadium, Sukhothai

Sukhothai won 5–4 on aggregate.

== Final ==
First Leg

21 December 2014
18:30 UTC+7

Prachuap Khiri Khan	0–0	Thai Honda

Sam Ao Stadium, Prachuap Khiri Khan

Second Leg

28 December 2014
18:30 UTC+7

Thai Honda	1–1	Prachuap Khiri Khan

Technology Stadium, Bangkok

1–1 on aggregate. Prachuap Khiri Khan won on away goals.

== Champions ==
The Regional League Division 2 2014 winners were Prachuap F.C.

== See also ==
- 2014 Thai Premier League
- 2014 Thai Division 1 League
- 2014 Thai FA Cup
- 2014 Thai League Cup
- 2014 Kor Royal Cup
- Thai Premier League All-Star Football
