= Rattapon Auttawong =

Thai footballer (born 1981)

Personal information
- Full name: Rattapon Auttawong
- Date of birth: 12 March 1981 (age 45)
- Place of birth: Thailand
- Height: 1.68 m (5 ft 6 in)
- Position: Midfielder

Team information
- Current team: Phrae United
- Number: 39

Senior career*
Years	Team	Apps	(Gls)
2013–2014	Chiangrai United	25	(0)
2015	Osotspa	20	(1)
2016	Navy	9	(0)
2016–	Phrae United		
- * Club domestic league appearances and goals

Rattapon Auttawong (Thai: รัฐพล อัฐวงศ์, born March 12, 1981) is a Thai professional footballer who plays as a midfielder.
