= Phetchabun F.C. =

Semi-professional football club in Thailand

Phetchabun FC
- Full name: Phetchabun Football Club
- Nickname: Sweet Tamarind Warriors
- Founded: 2009; 17 years ago
- Ground: Phetchabun Provincial Stadium
- Capacity: 1200
- Chairman: Jaruwan Saetang
- Manager: Jetsada Promphanjai
- League: Thailand Semi-pro League (Northern Region)
- Website: www.phetchabunfc.com
Home colours	Away colours	Third colours

Phetchabun Football Club is a football club in Thailand. It was officially established during the 2009 season. In its debut season in the Regional League Division 2, the club finished in fifth place, securing 30 point from 20 matches.

In 2010, the club underwent significant changes, including a new logo and a strategy focused on talent to build a strong community fan base. The club's crest features King Pha Mueang within a diamond, symbolizing the strength and heritage of Phetchabun Province.

Recently, a new management team took over to revitalize the "Sweet Tamarind Warriors". The club introduced a modernized visual identity and a professional management structure aimed at sustainability. the current goal is not only to compete in the Thailand Semi-pro League but also to prepare the club in all dimensions for a return to Thailand's professional national football leagues.

== Stadium and locations ==
Coordinates	Location	Stadium	Capacity	Year
16°26′53″N 101°09′04″E	Phetchabun	Thailand National Sports University, Phetchabun campus Stadium	1200	2009-present

== Season by season record ==
Season	League										FA Cup	League Cup	Top goalscorer	
Season	Division	Pl	W	D	L	GF	GA	GD	Pts	Pos	FA Cup	League Cup	Name	Goals
2009	DIV 2 North	20	9	3	8	32	28	+4	30	5th				
2010	DIV 2 North	30	12	7	11	47	35	+12	43	8th				
2011	DIV 2 North	30	9	7	14	43	52	-9	34	12th				
2012	DIV 2 North	34	7	8	19	27	65	-38	29	16th				
2013	DIV 2 North	30	3	8	19	21	54	-33	17	15th				
2014	DIV 2 North	26	5	6	15	31	46	-15	21	12th				
2015	DIV 2 North	26	7	7	12	27	39	-12	28	11th	Not Enter	QR2		
2016	DIV 2 North	22	2	4	16	6	45	-39	10	12th	Not Enter	QR2		
2017	TA North	6	3	0	4	11	17	-6	9	9th – 10th	Not Enter	Can't Enter		
2026	TS North	6	4	2	0	12	3	+9	14	3rd				

Champions	Runners-up	Third Place	Promoted	Relegated

- Pl = Played
- W = Games won
- D = Games drawn
- L = Games lost
- GF = Goals for
- GA = Goals against
- GD = Goals different
- Pts = Points
- Pos = Final position
- QR1 = First Qualifying Round
- QR2 = Second Qualifying Round
- R1 = Round 1
- R2 = Round 2
- R3 = Round 3
- R4 = Round 4
- R5 = Round 5
- R6 = Round 6
- QF = Quarter-finals
- SF = Semi-finals
- RU = Runners-up
- W = Winners

== Players ==
=== Current squad ===
As of 11 April 2026.

Note: Flags indicate national team as defined under FIFA eligibility rules; some limited exceptions apply. Players may hold more than one non-FIFA nationality.

No.	Pos.	Nation	Player
3	DF	THA	Pathiphan Chidjangreed
4	DF	THA	Sajja Sangsuwan
5	MF	THA	Nawapol Boonkoom
6	MF	THA	Apiwat Daengphuk
7	MF	THA	Arthit Sunthornphit
8	DF	THA	Puriphat Klinsut
9	FW	THA	Ekkachai Rittipan
10	MF	THA	Yuttana Putthawong
11	FW	THA	Supachai Thammarak
13	FW	THA	Prawit Pongkhan
14	MF	THA	Chumpon Seekhiao
15	MF	THA	Irfan Makul
16	DF	THA	Nirut Jamroensri
17	FW	THA	Jettapat Jaiphakdee
18	GK	THA	Jaturaporn Kahawong

No.	Pos.	Nation	Player
19	MF	THA	Farid Madsoh
20	FW	THA	Komsan Phummee
24	DF	THA	Jirameth Chaowponkrang
25	GK	THA	Passakorn Poopetch
27	MF	THA	Pongpisut Bualakhon
29	DF	THA	Peerawich Khaengkhan
32	GK	THA	Sarawut Kunok
38	MF	THA	Nattawut Chudok
41	DF	THA	Phattarachanon Dissorn
44	MF	THA	Anek Sonsukjai
69	FW	THA	Boriboon Yangsing-o
71	DF	THA	Nattapon Sangthong
77	MF	THA	Chanaphai Tewaphum
79	FW	THA	Sorawit Pakkawesa
99	MF	THA	Pongwisit Maneechot

== Head Coach ==
From 2026 - present

Name-Surname	Nationality	Period	Achievements
Jesada Promphanphanchai	(Thailand)	January 2026 - Present	
