= Tak F.C. =

Thai football club

Tak FC ตาก เอฟซี
- Full name: Tak Football Club สโมสรฟุตบอลจังหวัดตาก
- Nickname: The Tiger Soldiers
- Founded: 2009
- Ground: Tak Stadium; Tak, Thailand
- Capacity: 3,171
- Chairman: (Thailand) Jirasak Sritham
- Manager: (Thailand) Jetsada Saiyim
- League: Thai Division 2 League
Home colours	Away colours

Tak Football Club (Thai: สโมสรฟุตบอลจังหวัดตาก) is a Thai semi professional football club based in Tak Province. They currently play in Thai Division 2 League Northern Region.

== Timeline ==
History of events of Tak Football Club

Year	Important events
2008	The club is formed as Tak Football Club, nicknamed The Tiger Soldiers; Club admitted to the Regional League Northern Division; Home games to be played at Tak Stadium; Jetsada Saiyim named as the first ever coach of Tak

== Stadium and locations ==
Coordinates	Location	Stadium	Year
16°52′31″N 99°08′20″E	Tak	Tak Province Stadium (Tak PAO. Stadium)	2009–2011
16°54′10″N 99°07′19″E	Tak	Rajamangala University of Technology Tak Campus Stadium	2012
16°52′31″N 99°08′20″E	Tak	Tak Province Stadium (Tak PAO. Stadium)	2012–2014

== Season By Season Record ==
Season	League									FA Cup	League Cup	Top goalscorer	
Season	Division	P	W	D	L	F	A	Pts	Pos	FA Cup	League Cup	Name	Goals
2009	North	20	1	2	17	26	76	5	11th	R1			
2010	North	30	6	6	18	29	68	24	14th				
2011	North	30	5	4	21	32	64	19	15th				
2012	North	34	3	3	28	28	107	12	18th				
2013	North	30	2	2	26	14	81	8	16th				
2014	North	26	0	1	25	22	95	1	14th				
2015	North	-	-	-	-	-	-	-	suspended				

Champions	Runners-up	Promoted	Relegated

== Players ==
=== Current squad ===
Note: Flags indicate national team as defined under FIFA eligibility rules; some limited exceptions apply. Players may hold more than one non-FIFA nationality.

No.	Pos.	Nation	Player
1	GK	THA	Chaiwat Tavilo
3	DF	THA	Pornprom Jankrajang
4	DF	THA	Ekkawut Chaisad
5	DF	THA	Tadsapol Inkaew
6	DF	THA	Ekkapan Pongthai
7	MF	THA	Thanapong Jarernsook
8	MF	THA	Thanapat Sinted (captain)
9	FW	THA	Rusadee Aware-suemae
10	FW	THA	Tanandorn Praracha
11	FW	THA	Anon Praimui
12	MF	THA	Saktichai Darosrum
13	DF	THA	Panu Yotasaiyasan
14	MF	THA	Chanakorn Singpia
15	MF	THA	Sanchai Ketrod
16	MF	THA	Surachet Pothod

No.	Pos.	Nation	Player
17	DF	THA	Saichon Boonkong
18	GK	THA	Jatupol Masa
19	MF	THA	Chonlatit Pimol
20	MF	THA	Kumpolsak Permdee
21	DF	THA	Theerapong Tubtim
22	MF	THA	Somsak Ekkapas
24	MF	THA	Weerapong Sripetch
25	GK	THA	Sorapong Yapin
27	MF	CIV	Ouattara Alassan
28	DF	THA	Chanai Pelad
30	FW	THA	Ptipong Kaewsansai
31	MF	THA	Pongpan Panpun
32	MF	THA	Soros Puangkumma
33	MF	THA	Siwanat Injina
34	MF	THA	Surasak Chadthong
35	FW	THA	Theerayut Tapinta
