= Sukhothai F.C. =

Association football club in Thailand

Sukhothai สุโขทัย เอฟซี
- Full name: Sukhothai Football Club สโมสรฟุตบอลจังหวัดสุโขทัย
- Nicknames: The Fire Bats (ค้างคาวไฟ)
- Short name: SKT
- Founded: 2009; 17 years ago
- Ground: Thalay Luang Stadium; Sukhothai, Thailand
- Capacity: 8,000
- Chairman: Anongwan Thepsuthin
- Head coach: Eduardo Almeida
- League: Thai League 1
- 2025–26: Thai League 1, 13th of 16
- Website: www.sukhothaifootballclub.com
Home colours	Away colours	Third colours

Sukhothai Football Club (Thai: สโมสรฟุตบอลจังหวัดสุโขทัย) is a Thai professional football club based in Sukhothai province. The club currently play in the Thai League 1. Sukhothai represents the Sukhothai Province mainly known for being the first Kingdom of Thailand. Their main team colors are red and white and their away colors are black and green.

== History ==
=== Early history ===
Sukhothai Football Club was established in 2009 and entered the Regional League Northern Division. They finished their first ever season in the Regional League Northern Division in 7th place out of 11 teams. In 2014, after 6 years in the third tier division, Sukhothai got the promotion to 2015 Thai Division 1 League.

In 2015, the newly promotion team Sukhothai had a successful campaign in Thai Division 1 League with the finishing in the unexpected third place of the final standing. Sukhothai has promoted to 2016 Thai League.

=== Top flight league and first major honours ===
In 2016, In the club first year in the top league, Sukhothai created the overachieved run by finishing in the seventh place of the table. Sukhothai also qualified for 2017 AFC Champions League qualifying round after being one of co-winner of 2016 Thai FA Cup. Sukhothai then faced off against Myanmar club Yadanarbon in the preliminary round 2 where they beat them 5–0 to advance to the play-off round. Sukhothai then met Chinese club Shanghai SIPG but lost 3–0 at the Shanghai Stadium.

Sukhothai then finished off the 2020–21 Thai League 1 season in 14th place needing two points away from Suphanburi who is sitting on top of the relegation zone. The club was then relegated to the 2021–22 Thai League 2 season. In the next season, Sukhothai then finished off as runner-ups in the Thai League 2 sitting one point below league champions, Lamphun Warriors. Sukhothai then returned to the top flight after spending one season in the second division.

== Team image ==
=== Crest and colours ===
Sukhothai's identity is closely linked to the historical and cultural heritage of Sukhothai, Thailand's first capital and a UNESCO World Heritage site. The club crest prominently features a stylised depiction of a temple spire, inspired by Sukhothai's ancient architecture, symbolising history, tradition and pride. The design reflects the province's role as the birthplace of Thai civilisation and emphasises the club's connection to its local roots.

The club's primary colours revolves around their core colors of orange. Orange represents energy, passion and determination, reflecting the fighting spirit of the team and its supporters. These colours are consistently used across the club's home and away kits, as well as in its branding and merchandise, reinforcing Sukhothai's distinct and recognisable image within Thai football. In 2023, Sukhothai changed their primary home kit colour from orange to wine red, marking a notable departure from the club's traditional colour identity. The change was made as a special design choice to refresh the club's visual identity, with the wine red colour inspired by the historical and cultural significance of Sukhothai, symbolising heritage, dignity and a deeper connection to the province's past with the club logo being monochrome on the home kit.

=== Rivalries ===
Sukhothai's main neighboring rivals are with Phitsanulok and Kamphaengphet.

== Stadium ==
Coordinates	Location	Stadium	Year
16°58′30″N 99°47′22″E	Sukhothai	Sukhothai Institute of Physical Education Stadium	2009–2013
17°03′42″N 99°47′37″E	Sukhothai	Thalay Luang Stadium	2014–present

== Continental record ==
Season	Competition	Round	Club	Home	Away
2017	AFC Champions League	Preliminary round 2	(Myanmar) Yadanarbon	5–0	
2017	AFC Champions League	Play-off round	(China) Shanghai SIPG	0–3	

== Season by season record ==
Season	League									FA Cup	League Cup	Thailand Champions Cup	AFC Champions League	Top scorer	
Season	Division	P	W	D	L	F	A	Pts	Pos	FA Cup	League Cup	Thailand Champions Cup	AFC Champions League	Name	Goals
2009	DIV 2 North	20	6	6	8	29	29	24	7th			–	–		
2010	DIV 2 North	30	12	6	12	44	51	42	9th		R1	–	–		
2011	DIV 2 North	30	6	8	16	23	41	26	14th			–	–		
2012	DIV 2 North	30	9	10	15	23	37	37	14th			–	–		
2013	DIV 2 North	30	18	6	6	50	28	60	3rd			–	–		
2014	DIV 2 North	26	19	4	3	69	19	61	1st			–	–		
2015	DIV 1	38	17	11	10	71	52	62	3rd	R3	R1	–	–	Felipe Ferreira	25
2016	TL	31	13	6	12	50	44	45	7th	W	R3	–	–	Renan Marques	15
2017	T1	34	8	12	14	54	66	36	15th	R2	QF	RU	Play-off round	John Baggio	9
2018	T1	34	12	7	15	53	63	43	11th	R2	R1	–	–	Nelson Bonilla	25
2019	T1	30	6	16	8	37	37	34	12th	R3	R2	–	–	John Baggio	10
2020–21	T1	30	8	4	18	40	57	28	14th	R2	–	–	–	John Baggio	16
2021–22	T2	34	22	7	5	78	44	73	2nd	R1	QPR	–	–	Osman Sow	16
2022–23	T1	30	8	10	12	27	43	34	12th	R2	R1	–	–	Osman Sow	7
2023–24	T1	30	9	5	16	34	60	32	13th	QF	R2	–	–	Nelson Bonilla	8
2024–25	T1	30	9	9	12	47	54	36	10th	QF	R1	–	–	Matheus Fornazari	13
2025–26	T1	30	6	10	14	23	42	28	13th	R3	R2	–	–		

Champions	Runners-up	Promoted	Relegated

- P = Played
- W = Games won
- D = Games drawn
- L = Games lost
- F = Goals for
- A = Goals against
- Pts = Points
- Pos = Final position
- T1 = Thai League 1
- T2 = Thai League 2
- T3 = Thai League 3
- QR1 = First Qualifying Round
- QR2 = Second Qualifying Round
- QR3 = Third Qualifying Round
- QR4 = Fourth Qualifying Round
- RInt = Intermediate Round
- R1 = Round 1
- R2 = Round 2
- R3 = Round 3
- R4 = Round 4
- R5 = Round 5
- R6 = Round 6
- GS = Group stage
- QF = Quarter-finals
- SF = Semi-finals
- RU = Runners-up
- S = Shared
- W = Winners

== Players ==
=== Current squad ===
Note: Flags indicate national team as defined under FIFA eligibility rules; some limited exceptions apply. Players may hold more than one non-FIFA nationality.

No.	Pos.	Nation	Player
2	DF	THA	Jirawat Thongsaengphrao
3	DF	THA	Wattanakorn Sawatlakhorn
4	DF	THA	Sarawut Kanlayanabandit
5	DF	BRA	Yan Victor
6	DF	THA	Surawich Logarwit
7	FW	BRA	Alberto Gouvea
8	MF	THA	Ratchanat Aranpiroj
9	FW	BRA	Nathan
10	MF	BRA	Luccas Barreto
11	MF	BRA	Gustavo Apis
12	FW	THA	Chayawat Srinawong
14	MF	THA	Athirat Jantrapho
15	DF	THA	Saringkan Promsupa

No.	Pos.	Nation	Player
17	DF	THA	Tassanapong Muaddarak
18	GK	THA	Supazin Hnupichai
19	DF	THA	Pharadon Phatthaphon
20	MF	THA	Nalu Jandke
25	GK	THA	Narongsak Naengwongsa
27	DF	THA	Thiti Thumporn
28	MF	BRA	Rhuan
39	MF	THA	Athirat Jantrapho
70	MF	BRA	Luan Gabriel Rodrigues
80	MF	BRA	Murilo Souza
93	DF	BRA	Cláudio
94	FW	BRA	Jefferson Assis
99	GK	THA	Kittipun Saensuk

=== Out on loan ===
Note: Flags indicate national team as defined under FIFA eligibility rules; some limited exceptions apply. Players may hold more than one non-FIFA nationality.

No.	Pos.	Nation	Player
91	FW	THA	Thitiwat Phranmaen (at Chainat Hornbill)

== Honours ==
=== Domestic ===
- Regional League Northern Division
  - Winner (1) : 2014
- Thai FA Cup
  - Champions: 2016

== Managerial history ==
- (Thailand) Chusak Sriphum 2009–2014
- (Thailand) Somchai Makmool 2015
- (Thailand) Somchai Chuayboonchum 2015–2016
- (Thailand) Somchai Makmool 2016–2017
- (Thailand) Pairoj Borwonwatanadilok 2017–2018
- (Thailand) Yannawit Khantharat 2018
- (Thailand) Chalermwoot Sa-ngapol 2018
- (Serbia) Ljubomir Ristovski 2019
- (Thailand) Pairoj Borwonwatanadilok 2019
- (Thailand) Surapong Kongthep 2020–2021
- (Germany) Dennis Amato 2021–2023
- (Thailand) Chusak Sriphum 2023
- (Japan) Sugao Kambe 2023–2024
- (Thailand) Aktaporn Chalitaporn 2024–2026
- (Thailand) Rattee Ueathanaphaisarn 2026
- (Portugal) Eduardo Almeida 2026–
