= Chiangrai City F.C. =

Association football club in Thailand

Chiang Rai City F.C. เชียงราย ซิตี้
- Full name: Chiang Rai City Football Club สโมสรฟุตบอลเชียงรายซิตี้
- Nicknames: Northern Lions (สิงห์เหนือ)
- Short name: CRCFC
- Founded: 2010; 16 years ago (as Chiang Rai Football Club) (สโมสรฟุตบอลจังหวัดเชียงราย)
- Ground: Singha Stadium; Chiang Rai, Thailand
- Capacity: 11,354
- Owner: Boon Rawd Brewery
- Chairman: Pongrath Leuangthamrongchareon
- Head Coach: Nantawat Tansopa
- League: Thai League 3
- 2025–26: Thai League 3, 10th of 12 in the Northern region
Home colours	Away colours

Chiang Rai City Football Club (Thai: สโมสรฟุตบอลเชียงรายซิตี้) is a Thai professional football club based in Chiang Rai Province, a city located in the very northern part of Thailand. The club currently plays in Thai League 3 Northern Region.

== History ==
In 2022, Chiangrai City competed in the Thai League 3 for the 2022–23 season. It is their 13th season in the professional league. The club started the season with a 1–2 away defeat to Kamphaengphet and they ended the season with a 5–1 home win over Kamphaengphet. The club has finished 8th place in the league of the Northern region.

== Stadium and locations ==
Coordinates	Location	Stadium	Year
19°54′48″N 99°51′19″E	Chiang Rai	Chiangrai Province Stadium	2010–2011
19°59′25″N 99°50′59″E	Chiang Rai	Chiangrai Rajabhat University Stadium	2012
19°54′48″N 99°51′19″E	Chiang Rai	Chiangrai Province Stadium	2012–2017
19°57′25″N 99°52′29″E	Chiang Rai	Singha Stadium	2018

== Season by season record ==
Season	League									FA Cup	League Cup	T3 Cup	Top goalscorer	
Season	Division	P	W	D	L	F	A	Pts	Pos	FA Cup	League Cup	T3 Cup	Name	Goals
2010	North	30	8	4	18	43	64	28	11th					
2011	North	30	10	7	13	35	44	37	11th					
2012	North	34	3	6	25	34	72	15	17th					
2013	North	30	11	8	11	32	32	41	10th					
2014	North	26	14	5	7	52	31	47	5th					
2015	North	26	14	9	3	53	22	51	2nd	Opted out	R1			
2016	North	22	3	3	16	21	48	12	11th	Opted out	Opted out			
2017	T4 North	24	14	3	7	43	31	45	2nd	R1	QR1		(Brazil) Maryson Jone dos Santos	10
2018	T3 Upper	26	5	11	10	25	34	26	12th	Opted out	QRP		(South Korea) Kang Min-gu	8
2019	T3 Upper	24	6	6	12	33	44	24	9th	R1	QR2		(Brazil) Lenny Fernandas Coelho	7
2020–21	T3 North	14	3	4	7	13	21	13	8th	R2	Opted out		(Thailand) Suriphat Thaensopa	7
2021–22	T3 North	22	8	10	4	19	14	34	6th	Opted out	Opted out		(Japan) Ryuji Hirota	6
2022–23	T3 North	22	7	7	8	29	31	28	8th	Opted out	Opted out		(Thailand) Nuttapong Promsen	7
2023–24	T3 North	20	5	3	12	23	30	18	10th	Opted out	Opted out	Opted out	(Thailand) Suriphat Thaensopa	8
2024–25	T3 North	20	7	3	10	26	30	24	7th	Opted out	Opted out	LP	(Thailand) Wongwat Joroentaveesuk	7
2025–26	T3 North	22	6	6	10	28	44	24	10th	Opted out	Opted out	Opted out	(South Korea) Kim Seong-soo, (Thailand) Suriphat Thaensopa	5

Champions	Runners-up	Promoted	Relegated

== Players ==
As of 19 September 2026

Note: Flags indicate national team as defined under FIFA eligibility rules; some limited exceptions apply. Players may hold more than one non-FIFA nationality.

No.	Pos.	Nation	Player
3	DF	THA	Rattanan Panya
4	DF	THA	Dachochai Juntaropasukul
5	MF	THA	Watthikorn Ketpear
7	MF	THA	Wongwat Joroentaveesuk
8	FW	THA	Nantawat Tansopa
9	FW	THA	Nattapong Promsen
10	MF	THA	Parisorn Phoson
11	MF	KOR	Kim Dong-kyu
13	GK	THA	Yopdsawat Sukkaseam
14	MF	KOR	Noh Jin-young
16	FW	THA	Pakorn Pinsuwan
17	FW	THA	Sarayut Jaturapayasakung
22	GK	THA	Sirassawujt Songruankhum
23	MF	THA	Surawit Pongjai
24	MF	THA	Ratchaphon Panyana

No.	Pos.	Nation	Player
25	DF	THA	Thanaphum Chaengbut
26	DF	THA	Thanaphat Chaengbut
27	DF	THA	Teerapong Pongda
29	FW	THA	Kotchakan Thammasut
34	DF	THA	Sriachat Chanthima
36	DF	THA	Rachen Sobunma
48	MF	THA	Aujtchatuch Thinchan
50	FW	THA	Jirapt Kurasa
51	FW	THA	Aekkaphod Khamna
59	GK	THA	Apison Wanchlam
66	FW	THA	Chinngoen Phutonyong
67	MF	THA	Surawit Thanomsap
70	MF	THA	Chakklit Chittarungrot
88	MF	THA	Thanawat Loedchai
99	DF	THA	Phontakorn Thosanthiah

== Honours ==
=== Domestic leagues ===
- Thai League 4 Northern Region
  - Runners-up (1): 2017
- Regional League Northern Division
  - Runners-up (1): 2015
