= Wellington Adão =

Brazilian footballer (born 1988)

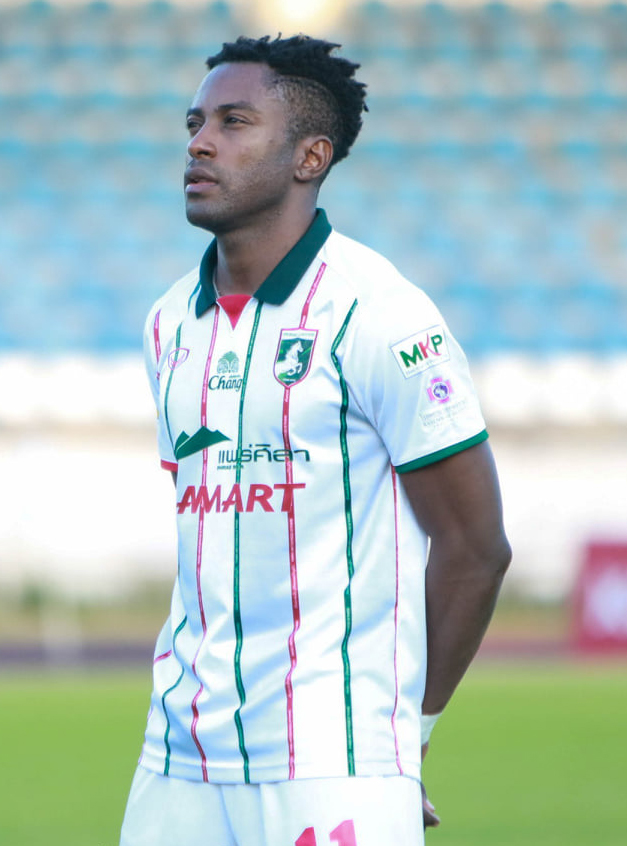
- Wellington Adão in 2022

Personal information
- Full name: Wellington Adão Gomes
- Date of birth: 7 May 1988 (age 38)
- Place of birth: Goiás, Brazil
- Height: 1.80 m (5 ft 11 in)
- Position: Forward

Senior career*
Years	Team	Apps	(Gls)
2006	Tanabi		
2007–2008	José Bonifácio		
2009	Bragantino		
2009	Palmeiras B		
2010	Jaboticabal		
2010–2011	Coronel Bolognesi		
2012	Sport Huancayo	17	(0)
2013–2015	Alianza Universidad	36	(16)
2016	Inter de Limeira	16	(3)
2017	Samut Sakhon		
2018	Unión Huaral	6	(2)
2019–2021	Phrae United	63	(23)
2022–2023	Becamex Bình Dương	15	(5)
2023–2024	Samut Sakhon City	10	(11)
2024–2025	Phrae United	32	(23)
2025–2026	Police Tero	25	(10)
- * Club domestic league appearances and goals as of 19 June 2026

Welington Adão Gomes (born 7 May 1988) is a Brazilian professional footballer as a forward.

== Career statistics ==
=== Club ===
As of 19 June 2026.

Club	Season	League			State league		Cup		Continental		Other		Total	
Club	Season	Division	Apps	Goals	Apps	Goals	Apps	Goals	Apps	Goals	Apps	Goals	Apps	Goals
Sport Huancayo	2012	Torneo Descentralizado	17	0	–		0	0	2 (Note: Appearances in the Copa Libertadores)	0	0	0	19	0
Alianza Universidad	2013	Segunda División	19	9	–		0	0	–		0	0	19	9
Alianza Universidad	2014	Segunda División	16	7	–		0	0	–		0	0	16	7
Alianza Universidad	2015	Segunda División	1	0	–		0	0	–		0	0	1	0
Alianza Universidad	Total		36	16	0	0	0	0	0	0	0	0	36	16
Inter de Limeira	2016	–			16 (Note: Appearances in the Campeonato Paulista A3)	3	0	0	–		0	0	16	3
Sport Huancayo	2018	Segunda División	6	2	–		0	0	–		0	0	6	2
Phrae United	2020–21	Thai League 2	22	10	–		0	0	–		0	0	22	10
Becamex Bình Dương	2022	V.League 1	1	0	–		0	0	–		0	0	1	0
Samut Sakhon City	2023–24	Thai League 3	10	11	–		3	2	–		0	0	13	13
Phrae United	2024–25	Thai League 2	32	23	–		1	0	–		0	0	33	23
Police Tero	2025–26	Thai League 2	25	10	–		1	0	–		0	0	26	10
Career total			149	72	16	3	5	2	2	0	0	0	172	77

== Honours ==
Individual

- Thai League 2 Top Scorer: 2024–25
- Thai League 2 Player of the Month: October 2025
