= Kamphaengphet F.C. =

Association football club in Thailand

Kamphaengphet กำแพงเพชร เอฟซี
- Full name: Kamphaengphet Football Club สโมสรฟุตบอลจังหวัดกำแพงเพชร
- Nicknames: Cha Kung Rao Warriors (นักรบชากังราว)
- Short name: KPPFC
- Founded: 2009; 17 years ago
- Ground: Cha Kung Rao Stadium; Kamphaengphet, Thailand
- Capacity: 2,406
- Chairman: Seksan Siripong
- Head coach: Seksan Siripong
- League: Thai League 3
- 2025–26: Thai League 3, 11th of 12 in the Northern region
Home colours	Away colours

Kamphaengphet Football Club (Thai สโมสรฟุตบอลจังหวัดกำแพงเพชร) is a Thai professional football club based in Kamphaeng Phet Province. The club currently plays in Thai League 3 Northern region.

In 2009, the club, nicknamed Cha Kung Rao Warriors, was formed and was admitted to the Regional League Northern Division. Its home games are played at Cha Kung Rao Stadium. Seksan Siripong was named as the first coach and chairman of the club.

== History ==
In 2022, Kamphaengphet competed in the Thai League 3 for the 2022–23 season. It is their 14th season in the professional league. The club started the season with a 2–1 home win over Chiangrai City and they ended the season with a 1–5 away defeat to Chiangrai City. The club has finished 9th place in the league of the Northern region. In addition, in the 2022–23 Thai FA Cup Kamphaengphet was defeated 0–2 by Phrae United in the second round, causing them to be eliminated and in the 2022–23 Thai League Cup Kamphaengphet was defeated 1–2 by Wat Bot City in the second qualification round, causing them to be eliminated too.

== Stadium and locations ==
Coordinates	Location	Stadium	Capacity	Year
16°28′39″N 99°31′17″E	Kamphaengphet	Kamphaeng Phet Provincial Administrative Organization Stadium	2,406	2009–2017

== Season by season record ==
Season	League									FA Cup	League Cup	T3 Cup	Top goalscorer	
Season	Division	P	W	D	L	F	A	Pts	Pos	FA Cup	League Cup	T3 Cup	Name	Goals
2009	North	20	4	9	7	24	31	21	8th	QR1				
2010	North	30	7	7	16	31	54	28	12th					
2011	North	30	10	8	12	40	41	38	10th					
2012	North	34	14	9	11	43	33	51	6th					
2013	North	30	6	5	19	16	40	23	13th					
2014	North	26	6	6	14	23	44	24	11th					
2015	North	26	8	6	12	33	32	30	10th	R4	R1			
2016	North	22	11	9	2	26	15	42	2nd	Opted out	QR1			
2017	T3 Upper	26	6	9	11	21	34	27	11th	Opted out	R1		(Japan) Otsu Kazutaka	6
2018	T3 Upper	26	6	9	11	24	32	29	11th	QR	QR1		(Oman) Badar Al-Alawi	6
2019	T3 Upper	24	7	5	12	21	33	26	8th	Opted out	QR2		(Thailand) Kawin Nuanthat	6
2020–21	T3 North	15	3	4	8	11	22	13	9th	R1	Opted out		(Thailand) Kawin Nuanthat	4
2021–22	T3 North	22	4	7	11	18	35	19	9th	R1	QRP		(Thailand) Punyaphat Autha	7
2022–23	T3 North	22	5	5	12	20	34	20	9th	R2	QR2		(Myanmar) Kaung Htet Soe, (Thailand) Khwanchai Bunprakhom	6
2023–24	T3 North	20	4	7	9	17	24	19	9th	R1	QRP	QR2	(Thailand) Natthaphon Yueayai	7
2024–25	T3 North	20	6	3	11	15	30	21	9th	R2	QR2	LP	(Thailand) Khwanchai Bunprakhom	6
2025–26	T3 North	22	5	4	13	17	36	19	11th	R1	QR2	LP	(Thailand) Khwanchai Bunprakhom	5

Champions	Runners-up	Promoted	Relegated

== Players ==
=== Current squad ===
As of 19 September 2023

Note: Flags indicate national team as defined under FIFA eligibility rules; some limited exceptions apply. Players may hold more than one non-FIFA nationality.

No.	Pos.	Nation	Player
1	GK	USA	Jeremy Zielinski
2	DF	THA	Yanavat Rattabut
3	DF	BRA	Gustavo
4	FW	THA	Nitipoom Chimsaard
5	DF	THA	Natthawat Phimaugsorn
6	DF	THA	Theerawat Wararittiwong
7	FW	THA	Thapanawat Chaophayao
8	FW	JPN	Satoshi Kurokawa
9	MF	THA	Poommipat Poorahong
10	FW	THA	Kawin Nuanthai
11	DF	THA	Jettawee Sukhoyachai
12	FW	THA	Apiched Ranmeechai
13	MF	THA	Phattadon Singhaphat
14	FW	THA	Anek Sonsudjai
15	FW	THA	Natthawut Klamcharoen
16	FW	THA	Methus Thongnueaha
17	DF	THA	Wiroch Manoi

No.	Pos.	Nation	Player
18	GK	THA	Jirasak Kunnapan
19	MF	THA	Thibet Paison
20	MF	THA	Yodpon Manojit
21	DF	THA	Ratthapong Aocharot
23	FW	THA	Patiphol Thosaeng
24	FW	THA	Natthaphon Yueayai
25	DF	THA	Sumet Paenpan
30	GK	THA	Wisanu Aunmuang
31	DF	THA	Phaetthik Aetkinsan
32	MF	THA	Kasidit Pannarong
33	FW	THA	Khwanchai Bunprakhom
44	FW	THA	Harinut Weerakijphanich
47	DF	THA	Tanapat Kingsanthia
49	MF	THA	Ratchanon Kaewpueng
54	MF	THA	Jakkarin Leenalach
55	GK	THA	Phongsiri Siriphong
66	MF	THA	Napat Phaosiri
