= 2012 Regional League Division 2 =

Regional League Championships 2012
- Season: 2012
- Champions: Ayutthaya
- Promoted: Ayutthaya; Rayong; Rayong United; Trat

The 2012 Regional League Division 2 (also known as the AIS Regional League Division 2 for sponsorship reasons) was contested by the five regional league winners and runners up of the 3rd level championships of Thailand. The two best 3rd placed teams from the regional leagues also take part

Twelve teams were split into two groups of A & B, with the top two teams from group A & B gaining promotion to the Yamaha League-1 for the 2013 campaign, along with this, the two group winners would play off to determine the overall champions.

== 2012 Regional League table All locations ==
Locations of the Regional League Division 2 All Teams in 2012
2012 Regional League Division 2 Bangkok & field Region
2012 Regional League Division 2 Central & Eastern Region
2012 Regional League Division 2 Northern Region
2012 Regional League Division 2 North Eastern Region
2012 Regional League Division 2 Southern Region

=== 2012 ===
red Zone:2012 Regional League Division 2 Bangkok Metropolitan Region
Yellow Zone:2012 Regional League Division 2 Central & Eastern Region
Green Zone: 2012 Regional League Division 2 Northern Region Region
Orange Zone:2012 Regional League Division 2 North Eastern Region
Blue Zone:2012 Regional League Division 2 Southern Region

=== List of qualified teams ===
Bangkok & field (2)

- Thai Honda (Winner)
- Rayong United (Runner-up)

Central & Eastern (3)

- Ayutthaya (Winner)
- Rayong (Runner-up)
- Trat (3rd)

Northern (3)

- Chiangmai (Winner)
- Phitsanulok (Runner-up)
- Paknampho NSRU (3rd)

North Eastern (2)

- Roi Et United (Winner)
- Sisaket United (Runner-up)

Southern (2)

- Trang (Winner)
- Pattani (Runner-up, Winner Championship Pool Qualifying play-off)
Football clubs in Bangkok Metropolitan Region

=== Championship Pool Qualifying play-off ===
26 September 2012	Pattani	1 – 1 (5 – 4 p)	RBAC BEC Tero Sasana	Thailand
18:00 UTC+08:00	Hayeeasa 59'			Attendance: 8,000

== Champions League round table ==
=== Group A ===
Pos	Team	Pld	W	D	L	GF	GA	GD	Pts	Promotion
1	Ayutthaya	10	6	2	2	16	9	+7	20	Promoted to Yamaha League-1
2	Rayong United	10	4	2	4	13	13	0	14	Promoted to Yamaha League-1
3	Phitsanulok	10	4	2	4	10	10	0	14	
4	Roi Et United	10	3	4	3	10	11	−1	13	
5	Paknampho NSRU	10	3	2	5	10	12	−2	11	
6	Pattani	10	2	4	4	9	13	−4	10	

Last updated December 9, 2012

=== Group B ===
Pos	Team	Pld	W	D	L	GF	GA	GD	Pts	Promotion
1	Trat	10	7	1	2	22	10	+12	22	Promoted to Yamaha League-1
2	Rayong	10	4	4	2	12	10	+2	16	Promoted to Yamaha League-1
3	Chiangmai	10	4	3	3	18	11	+7	15	
4	Sisaket United	10	4	3	3	12	11	+1	15	
5	Thai Honda	10	2	2	6	9	19	−10	8	
6	Trang	10	1	3	6	10	22	−12	6	

Rules for classification: 1st points; 2nd head-to-head; 3rd goal difference; 4th goals scored

== 3/4 Place ==
First Leg

15 December 2012
18:00 UTC+7

Rayong	2 – 1	Rayong United

Rayong Stadium, Rayong

Second Leg

22 December 2012
17:30 UTC+7

Rayong United	0 – 0	Rayong

Klaeng Stadium, Rayong

== Final ==
First Leg

16 December 2012
18:00 UTC+7

Ayutthaya	1 – 0	Trat

Ayutthaya Stadium, Ayutthaya
Referee: Mongkolchai Pechsri

Second Leg

23 December 2012
17:30 UTC+7

Trat	3 – 2	Ayutthaya

Trat Stadium, Trat
Referee: Teetichai Nualjan

== Champions ==
The Regional Division 2 2012 winners were Ayutthaya.
