= Lampang F.C. =

Thai professional association football club

Lampang ลำปาง เอฟซี
- Full name: Lampang Football Club สโมสรฟุตบอลจังหวัดลำปาง
- Nicknames: The Emerald Chariots (รถม้ามรกต)
- Short name: LPFC
- Founded: 2010
- Dissolved: 2025
- Ground: Lampang Province Stadium; Lampang, Thailand
- Capacity: 5,500
Home colours	Away colours	Third colours

Lampang Football Club (Thai: สโมสรฟุตบอลจังหวัดลำปาง) was a Thai defunct professional association football club based in Lampang Province.

== History ==
In 2010, The club was formed as Lampang Football Club, nicknamed The Emerald Chariots and entered in the Regional League Northern Division. Home games were played at the Lampang Province Stadium.

In 2016, FourFourTwo, an English football magazine, ranked the 21 best football club logos worldwide, and Lampang FC's logo won the judges' approval and was ranked second in the world, behind only AFC Ajax, a top team in the Eredivisie.

The club dissolved in 2025 after selling its team rights to a group of investors interested in ownership only, not competition. In 2026, The Football Association of Thailand has officially revoked Lampang FC's membership. This decision follows the club's announcement to cease operations in 2025 and withdraw from the upcoming competitions. This officially marks the end of the "Emerald Chariots" era, a club that once reached the top flight of Thai football.

== Stadium and locations ==
Coordinates	Location	Stadium	Year
18°18′10″N 99°28′23″E	Lampang	Lampang Province Stadium	2010–2025

== Season by season record ==
Season	League									FA Cup	League Cup	Top goalscorer	
Season	Division	P	W	D	L	F	A	Pts	Pos	FA Cup	League Cup	Name	Goals
2010	DIV 2 North	30	7	6	17	33	48	27	13th	Opted out	Opted out		
2011	DIV 2 North	30	11	7	12	28	44	40	9th	Opted out	Opted out		
2012	DIV 2 North	34	9	10	15	38	42	37	13th	Opted out	Opted out		
2013	DIV 2 North	30	16	5	9	42	30	53	5th	Opted out	Opted out		
2014	DIV 2 North	26	11	10	5	35	18	43	6th	Opted out	Opted out		
2015	DIV 2 North	26	14	10	2	37	14	52	1st	R2	R2		
2016	DIV 1	27	6	10	11	39	52	28	11th	Opted out	QF	Sirisak Musbu-ngor	12
2017	T2	32	13	8	11	45	47	47	6th	R3	QRP	David Bala	18
2018	T2	28	8	10	10	32	35	34	9th	R2	R1	Melvin de Leeuw	11
2019	T2	34	11	12	11	41	45	45	10th	R2	R1	Rafael Coelho	15
2020–21	T2	34	11	7	16	39	46	40	12th	R2	–	Somsak Musikaphan	7
2021–22	T2	34	15	12	7	67	38	57	4th	R3	R1	Deyvison Fernandes	20
2022–23	T1	30	4	7	19	24	60	19	16th	R3	R2	Chawin Thirawatsri	6
2023–24	T2	34	15	9	10	50	41	54	8th	R2	R1	Caio Rodrigues da Cruz	10
2024–25	T2	32	13	9	10	48	39	48	6th	R2	R1	Caio Rodrigues da Cruz	16

Champions	Runners-up	Promoted	Relegated

== Former coaches ==
- (Thailand) Surachai Jirasirichote 2016 – 2017
- (Serbia) Srdjan Trailovic 2018 – 2020
- (Thailand) Atthakorn Seanpeng 2020
- (Thailand) Prasert Changmoon 2020
- (Thailand) Tewesh Kamolsin 2020
- (Thailand) Somchai Makmool 2020 – 2021
- (Thailand) Weerayut Bin Abdullohman 2021
- (Thailand) Sukrit Yothee 2021 – 2023
- (Thailand) Kitthachai Wongsim 2023 – 2024
- (Thailand) Theerawekin Seehawong 2024
- (Thailand) Witthaya Dongyai 2024 – 2025

== Honours ==
=== Domestic leagues ===
- Regional League Northern Division
  - Winners (1): 2015
