= Phichit F.C. =

Thai football club

Phichit FC พิจิตร เอฟซี
- Full name: Phichit Football Club สโมสรฟุตบอลจังหวัดพิจิตร
- Nicknames: The King Crocodiles (พญาชาละวัน)
- Founded: 2009; 17 years ago
- Ground: Phichit Stadium; Phichit, Thailand
- Capacity: 20,000
- Chairman: Chatchai Jiamsripong
- League: Thai League 3
- 2015: 16th (Relegated)
Home colours	Away colours

Phichit Football Club (Thai: สโมสรฟุตบอลจังหวัดพิจิตร) is a Thai semi-professional football club based in Phichit Province. Their home stadium is Phichit Stadium. They currently withdrew to play in Thai League 3 Northern Region.

== Timeline ==
History of events of Phichit Football Club

Year	Important events
2009	The club is formed as Phichit Football Club, nicknamed The King Crocodiles (พญาชาละวัน); Club admitted to the Regional League Northern Division; Home games to be played at Khao Sai Stadium; Sorasak Radsorn named as the first ever coach of Phichit

== Honours ==
=== Domestic Leagues ===
- Regional League Central Division:

Winners : 2016 (as name Ayutthaya Warrior)

- Regional League Northern Division
  - Runner-Up (2) : 2009, 2014

== Stadium and locations ==
Coordinates	Location	Stadium	Capacity	Year
16°09′17″N 100°37′35″E	Phichit	Khao Sai Municipality Stadium	?	2009
16°26′35″N 100°19′26″E	Phichit	Phichit Provincial Stadium (Phichit PAO. Stadium)	15.000	2010–2015

== Season By Season Record ==
Season	League									FA Cup	League Cup	Top scorer	
Season	Division	P	W	D	L	F	A	Pts	Pos	FA Cup	League Cup	Name	Goals
2009	North	20	13	4	4	55	28	42	2nd				
2010	North	30	19	6	5	73	25	63	3rd				
2011	North	30	18	8	4	47	27	62	3rd				
2012	North	34	13	9	12	45	38	48	8th				
2013	North	30	17	8	5	53	30	59	4th				
2014	North	26	17	4	5	65	26	55	2nd				
2015	DIV 1	38	12	12	14	43	54	48	17th	Not Enter	R1	Melvin Kicmett	11
2016	-	-	-	-	-	-	-	-	Withdrew	-	-	-	-
2017	T3 Upper								Banned				
2018									Banned				
2019	T4 North												

Champions	Runners-up	Promoted	Relegated
