= Phrae United F.C. =

Thai football club

Phrae United แพร่ ยูไนเต็ด
- Full name: Phrae United Football Club สโมสรฟุตบอลแพร่ยูไนเต็ด
- Nicknames: The Horsemen (ม้าคะนองศึกลุ่มน้ำยม)
- Short name: PHR; PRUTD
- Founded: 2009; 17 years ago as Phrae Football Club; 2010; 16 years ago as Phrae United Football Club
- Ground: Huai Ma Stadium; Phrae, Thailand
- Capacity: 2,500
- Chairman: Suphawan Suphasiri
- Head Coach: Ronachai Jinakate
- League: Thai League 2
- 2025–26: Thai League 2, 10th of 18
Home colours	Away colours

Phrae United Football Club (Thai: สโมสรฟุตบอลแพร่ยูไนเต็ด) is a Thai professional football club based in Phrae province. They currently play in Thai League 2.

== Timeline ==
History of events of Phrae United Football Club

Year	Important events
2009	The club is formed as Phrae F.C., nicknamed The Horsemen; Club admitted to the Regional League Northern Division; Home games to be played at Phrae PAO Stadium, capacity, 4,500; Somkied Samerjai named as the first ever coach of Phrae
2010	Renamed Phrae United F.C. and unveil new club logo

== Current squad ==
Note: Flags indicate national team as defined under FIFA eligibility rules; some limited exceptions apply. Players may hold more than one non-FIFA nationality.

No.	Pos.	Nation	Player
2	DF	THA	Karndanai Thawornsak
4	DF	THA	Laphonwich Sutthasen (Captain)
5	DF	THA	Thanakorn Jaiphet
6	MF	THA	Chattharin Pateetin
7	MF	JPN	Kento Nagasaki
8	MF	THA	Warut Boonsuk
9	FW	BRA	Kainã
10	MF	JPN	Taku Ito
11	DF	THA	Decha Moohummad
14	FW	THA	Panupong Wongpila
15	MF	THA	Tanadol Chaipa
16	MF	THA	Thana Isor
17	DF	THA	Rangsiman Sruamprakam
18	GK	THA	Panthakit Boonyachot
19	FW	THA	Athit Phiraban
20	MF	THA	Anukun Fomthaisong

No.	Pos.	Nation	Player
22	DF	THA	Pongsil Thana
23	DF	THA	Pongsakorn Takum
24	MF	THA	Siwakorn Sangwong
27	DF	THA	Athit Promkhun
28	MF	THA	Amnart Pamornprasert
30	DF	THA	Adisak Narattho
35	DF	THA	Weerawut Kayem
37	MF	THA	Ekkalarp Hanpanichkij
42	GK	THA	Takdanai Klomklieng
63	FW	THA	Thammayut Rakbun
70	FW	BRA	Filipe Vasconcelos Paim
93	GK	THA	Kiadtiphon Udom
95	FW	BRA	Judivan

== Coaching staff ==
Position	Name
Team manager	(Thailand) Suphawan Suphasiri
Head coach	(Thailand) Ronachai Jinaket
Assistant coach	(Thailand) Prathan Senala (Thailand) Durongrit Srila (Thailand) Kiatprawut Saiwaeo (Thailand) Somchai Sawasdee
Goalkeeping coach	(Thailand) Jakgid Thammasaen
Fitness coach	(Thailand) Kananat Ditthanachot

== Stadium and locations by season record ==
Coordinates	Location	Stadium	Year
18°09′01″N 100°09′19″E	Phrae	Phrae Provincial Administrative Organization Stadium	2009–2011
18°10′29″N 100°10′15″E	Phrae	Thunghong Subdistrict municipality Stadium	2012
18°09′01″N 100°09′19″E	Phrae	Phrae Provincial Administrative Organization Stadium	2013
18°10′29″N 100°10′15″E	Phrae	Thunghong Subdistrict municipality Stadium	2014–2017

== Season by season record ==
Season	League									FA Cup	League Cup	Top goalscorer	
Season	Division	P	W	D	L	F	A	Pts	Pos	FA Cup	League Cup	Name	Goals
2009	North	20	3	7	10	20	40	16	10th	Opted out			
2010	North	30	12	12	6	31	19	48	5th	Opted out	R1		
2011	North	30	10	12	8	28	22	42	8th	Opted out	R1		
2012	North	34	15	14	5	44	24	59	5th	Opted out	Opted out		
2013	North	30	12	6	12	34	34	42	9th	Opted out	R2		
2014	North	26	13	9	4	43	30	48	4th	Opted out	Opted out		
2015	North	26	14	6	6	33	23	48	3rd	Opted out	QF		
2016	North	22	13	3	6	32	25	42	3rd	Opted out	QR2	(Thailand) Jakkrit Bunkham	7
2017	T3 Upper	26	10	5	11	31	32	35	6th	R1	QRP	(Thailand) Jaruwat Narmmool	8
2018	T3 Upper	26	11	9	6	28	20	42	4th	R2	QRP	(Brazil) Jhonatan Bernardo	7
2019	T3 Upper	24	18	4	2	48	13	58	2nd	R1	R1	(Thailand) Arthit Peeraban	9
2020–21	T2	34	16	11	7	49	27	59	5th	Opted out	–	(Brazil) Wellington Adão	11
2021–22	T2	34	14	12	8	51	35	54	6th	R1	Opted out	(Brazil) Rodrigo Maranhão	17
2022–23	T2	34	13	12	9	50	43	51	9th	QF	Opted out	(Brazil) Rodrigo Maranhão	16
2023–24	T2	34	11	7	16	37	53	40	11th	R1	Opted out	(Brazil) Patrick Cruz	10
2024–25	T2	32	17	7	8	61	38	58	3rd	QF	Opted out	(Brazil) Wellington Adão	23
2025–26	T2	34	10	13	11	40	50	43	10th	Opted out	Opted out		

Champions	Runners-up	Third place	Promoted	Relegated

- P = Played
- W = Games won
- D = Games drawn
- L = Games lost
- F = Goals for
- A = Goals against
- Pts = Points
- Pos = Final position
- QR1 = First Qualifying Round
- QR2 = Second Qualifying Round
- R1 = Round 1
- R2 = Round 2
- R3 = Round 3
- R4 = Round 4
- R5 = Round 5
- R6 = Round 6
- QF = Quarter-finals
- SF = Semi-finals
- RU = Runners-up
- W = Winners
