= Phrae Provincial Administrative Organization Stadium =

Stadium in Thailand

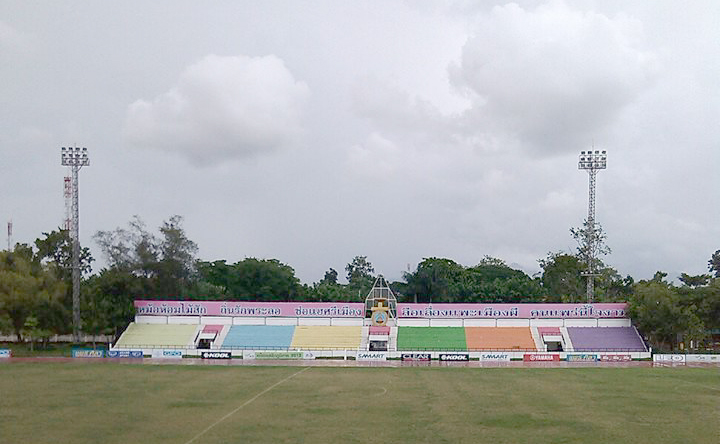
- Interactive map of Phrae Provincial Administrative Organization Stadium
- Location: Phrae, Thailand
- Coordinates: 18°09′01″N 100°09′19″E
- Surface: Grass

Tenant
- Phrae United

Phrae Provincial Administrative Organization Stadium (Thai: สนาม อบจ.แพร่) or Phrae Province Stadium (Thai: สนามกีฬาจังหวัดแพร่) is a multi-purpose stadium in Phrae Province, Thailand. It is currently used mostly for football matches. The stadium holds 4,500 people.
