= Thunghong Subdistrict municipality Stadium =

Multi-purpose stadium in Phrae province, Thailand

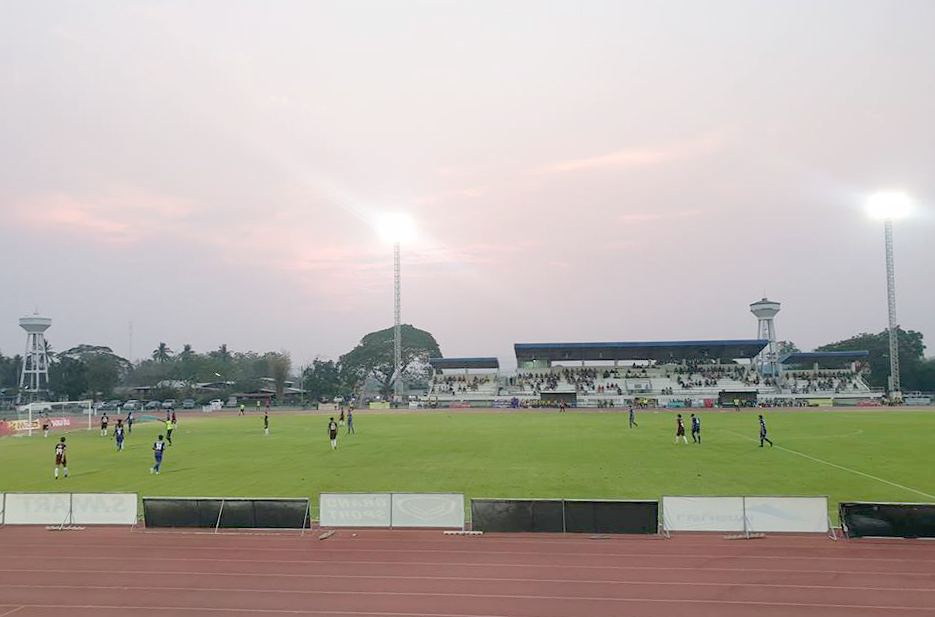
- Interactive map of Thunghong Subdistrict municipality Stadium
- Location: Phrae, Thailand
- Coordinates: 18°10′29″N 100°10′15″E
- Capacity: 3,000
- Surface: Grass

Tenant
- Phrae United F.C. 2011-2012

Thunghong Subdistrict municipality Stadium (Thai: สนามเทศบาลตำบลทุ่งโฮ้ง) is a multi-purpose stadium in Phrae Province, Thailand. It is currently used mostly for football matches and is the home stadium of Phrae United F.C. The stadium holds 3,000 people.
