= Sukhothai Institute of Physical Education Stadium =

Multi-purpose stadium in Sukhothai, Thailand

Institute of Physical Education Sukhothai Stadium
- Sukhothai Stadium
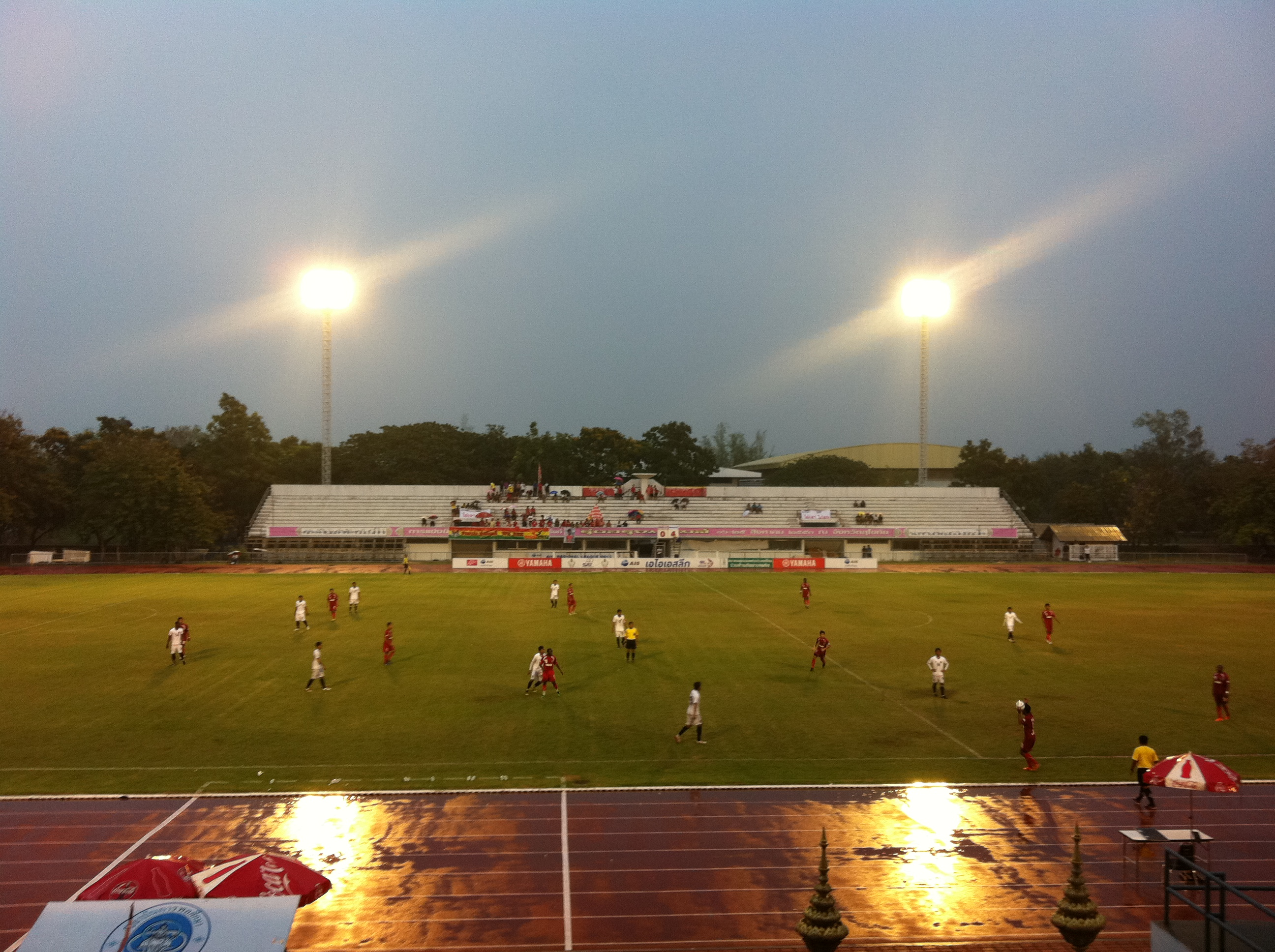
- Interactive map of Institute of Physical Education Sukhothai Stadium
- Former names: Bunsom Martin Stadium
- Location: Sukhothai, Thailand
- Coordinates: 16°58′30″N 99°47′22″E
- Owner: Institute of Physical Education, Sukhothai
- Operator: Institute of Physical Education, Sukhothai
- Capacity: 4,500
- Surface: Grass

Construction
- Opened: 2009

The Sukhothai Institute of Physical Education Stadium or Sukhothai Province Stadium (Thai: สนามกีฬา สพล. สุโขทัย หรือ สนามกีฬาจังหวัดสุโขทัย หรือ สนามกีฬาบุญสม มาติน) is a multi-purpose stadium in Sukhothai Province, Thailand, that hosted Sukhothai F.C. in the Thailand Division 2 League from 2009 to 2013. The stadium is made up of a main stand with a capacity of 2,500 and second stand on the opposite side of the field with a capacity of 2,000. Only the main stand has seats and is covered, the second stand is uncovered and is made of concrete steps. The stadium is also fitted with an electronic scoreboard and is also used by the local public for various events.

== Main stand ==
The main stand has a maximum capacity of 2,500 (All seated) and also contains most facilities including changing rooms, meeting rooms and a media room.

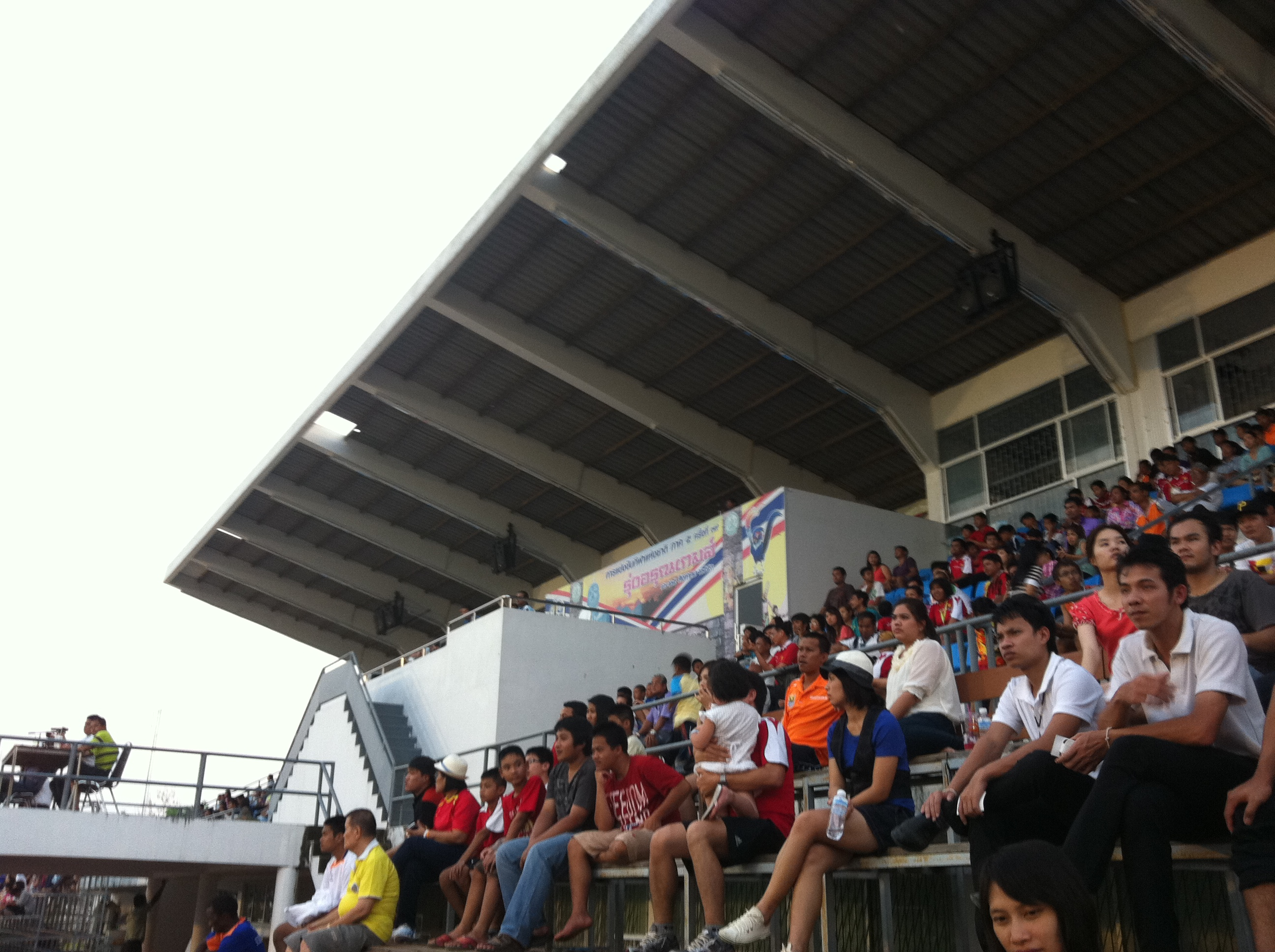
Spectators on the main stand at the Sukhothai Institute of Physical Education Stadium
