= Kamphaeng Phet =

Coordinates: 16°28′52″N 99°31′20″E

Kamphaeng Phet กำแพงเพชร
- Town
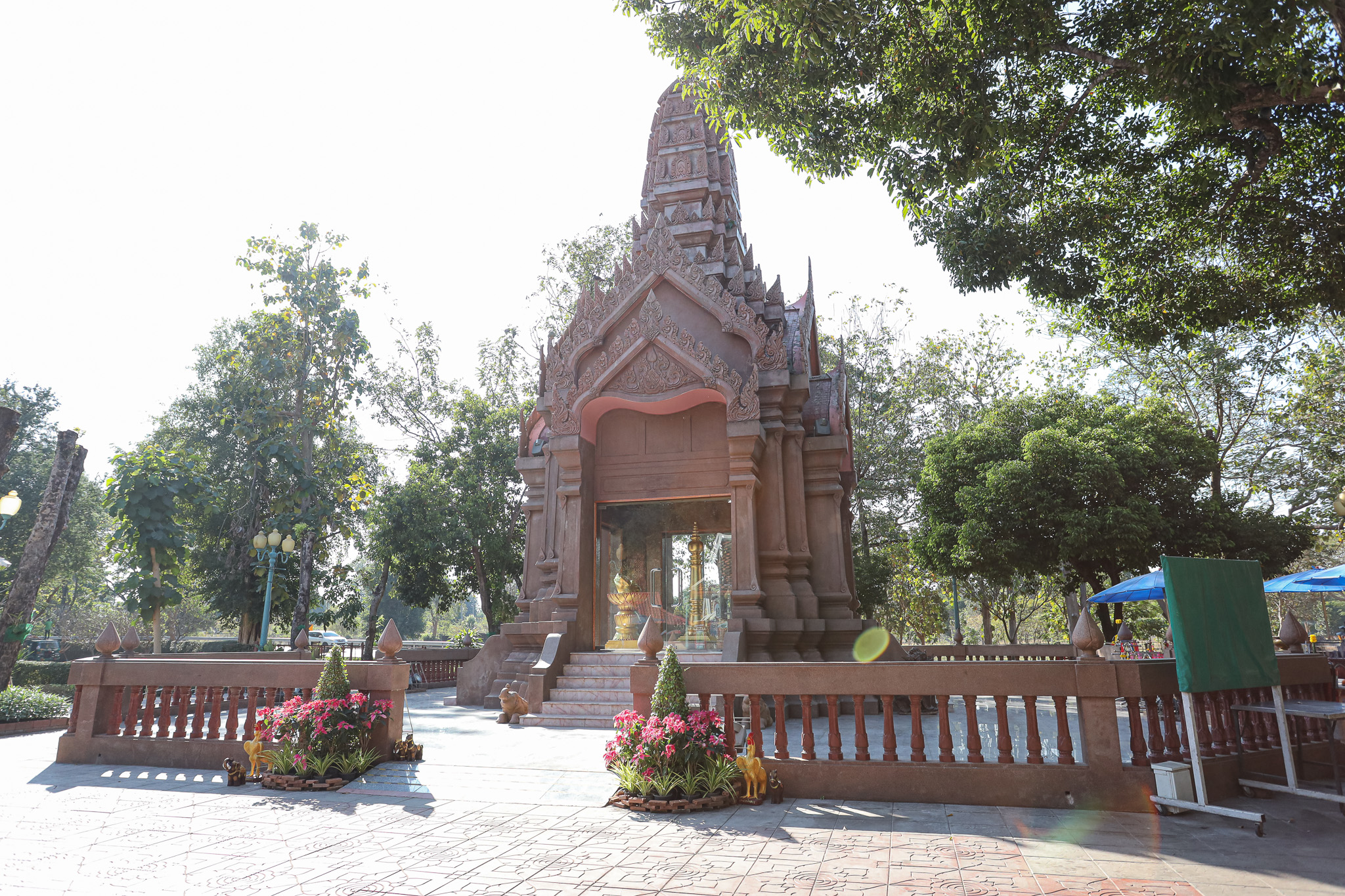
- Kamphaeng Phet city pillar shrine

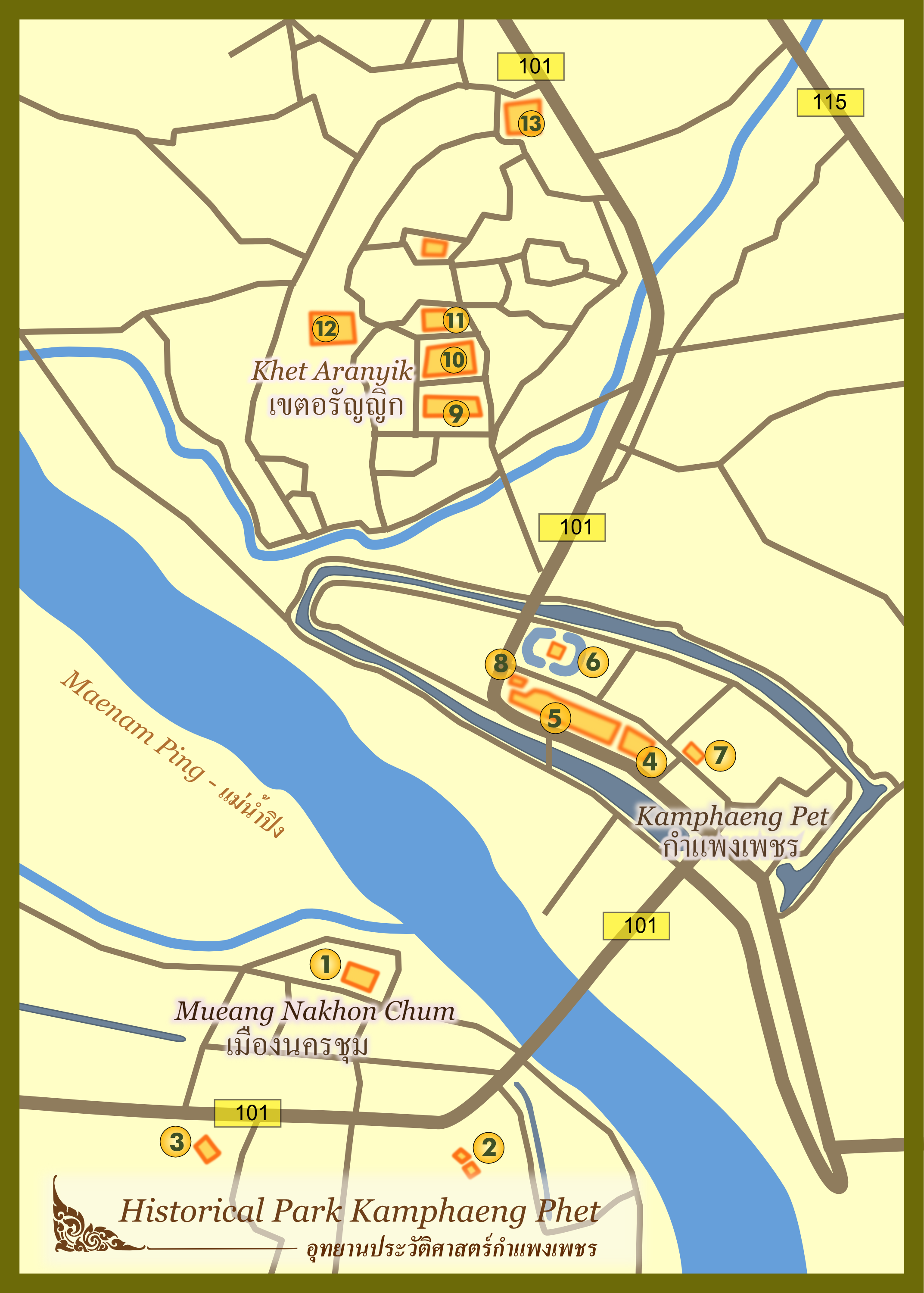
- Map of Kamphaeng Phet
- Country: Thailand
- Province: Kamphaeng Phet Province

Area
  - Metro: 14.9 km^{2} (5.8 sq mi)

Population (2020)
  - Town: 28,817
- Time zone: UTC+7 (ICT)

Kamphaeng Phet is a town (thesaban mueang) in central Thailand, the former capital of Kamphaeng Phet Province. It covers the complete tambon Nai Mueang of the Mueang Kamphaeng Phet district. As of 2020, it has a population of 28,817. The site carries the walls and fortifications of a town of the Sukhothai period. Two older names, Chakangrao and Nakhon Chum, are attached to the two banks of the Ping, and the sources differ over which name belonged to which bank.

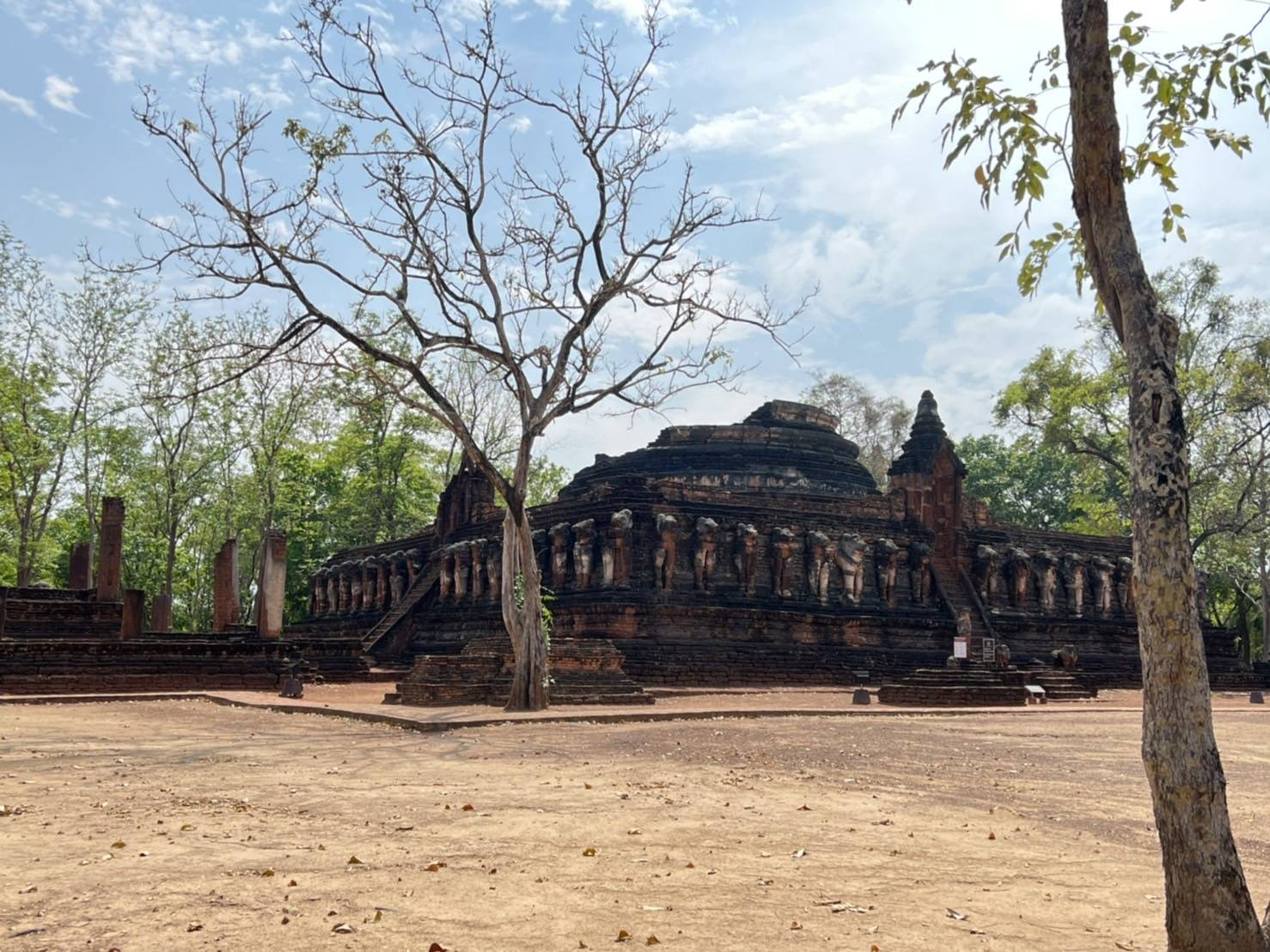

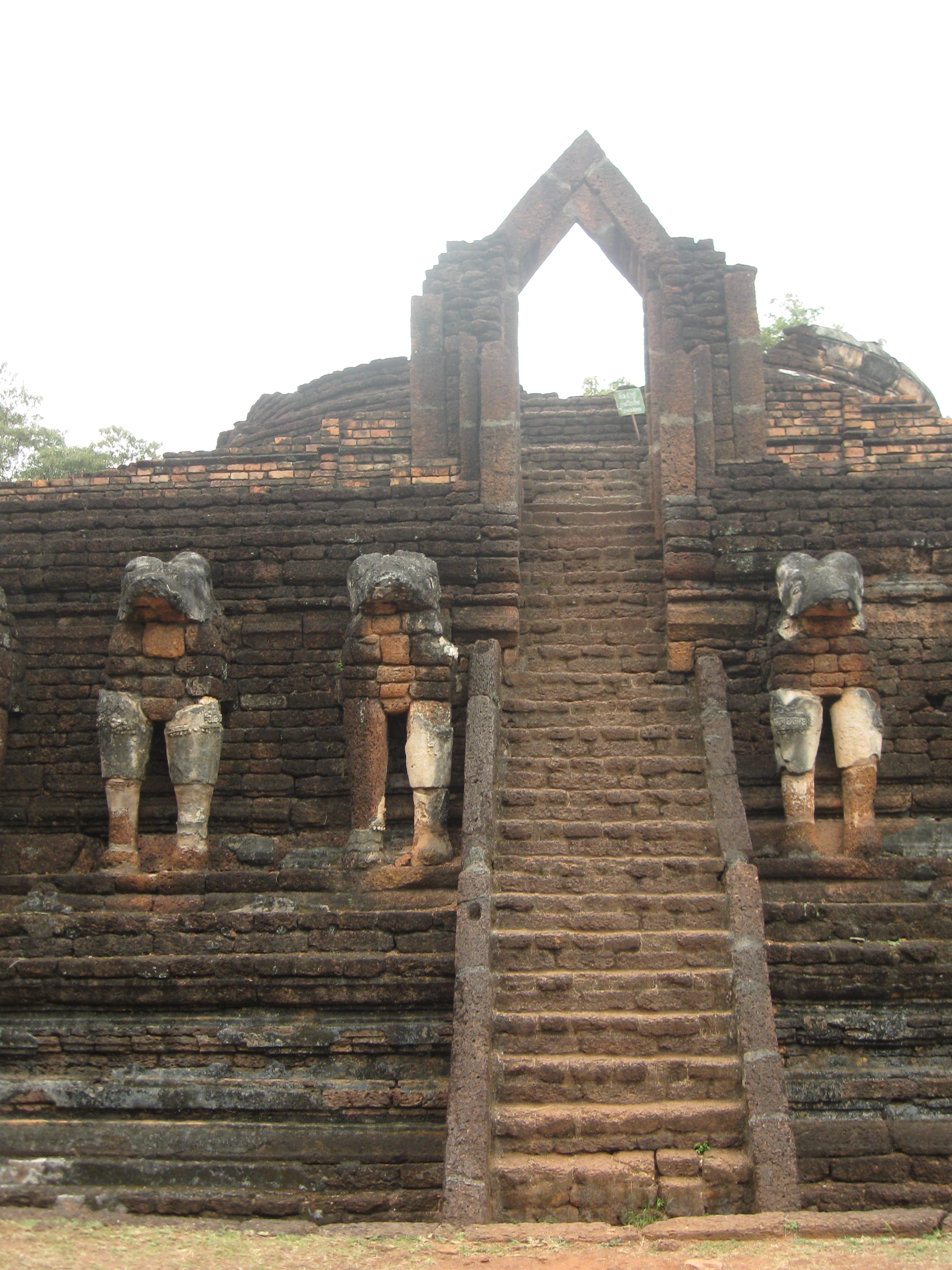

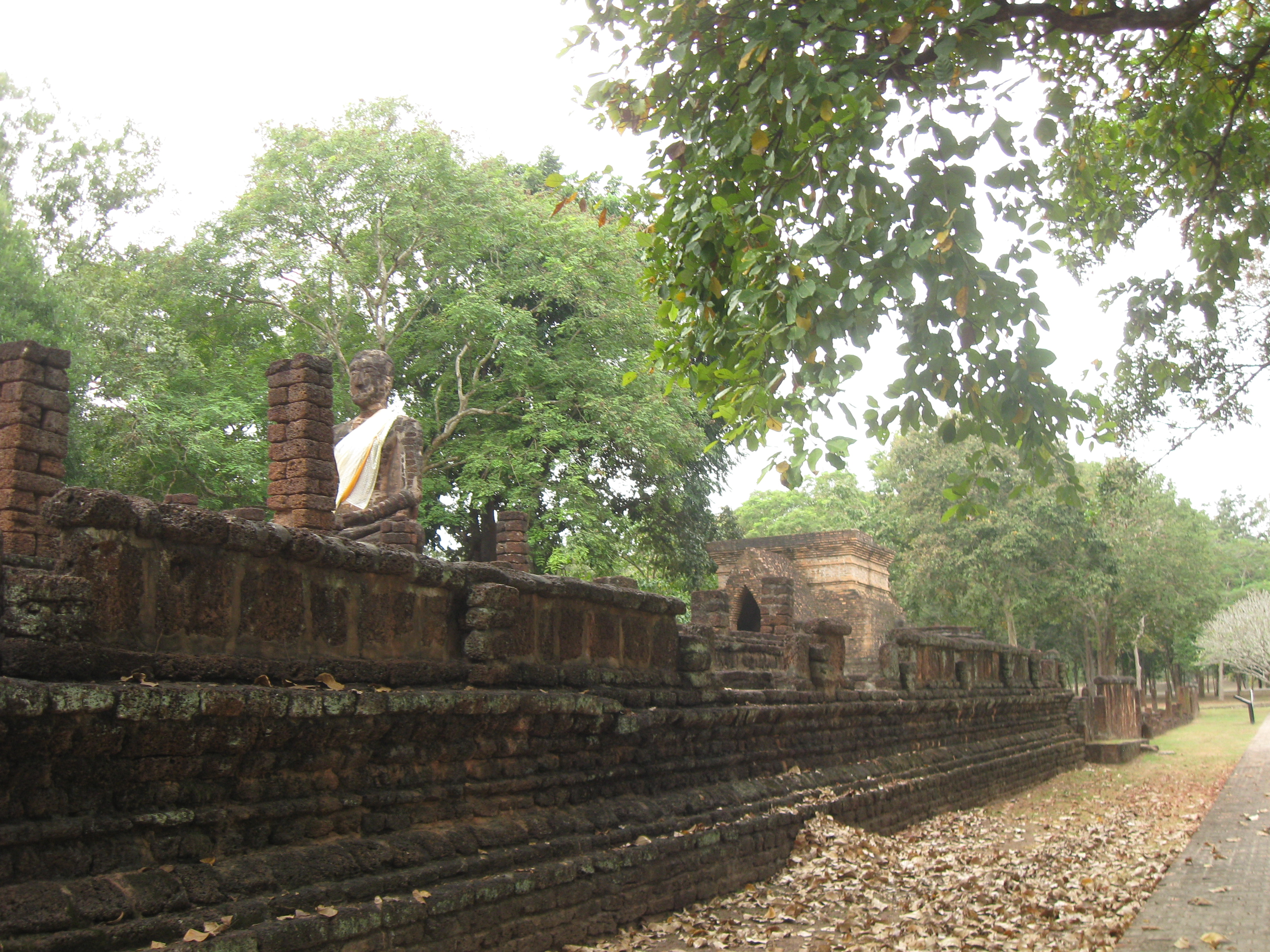

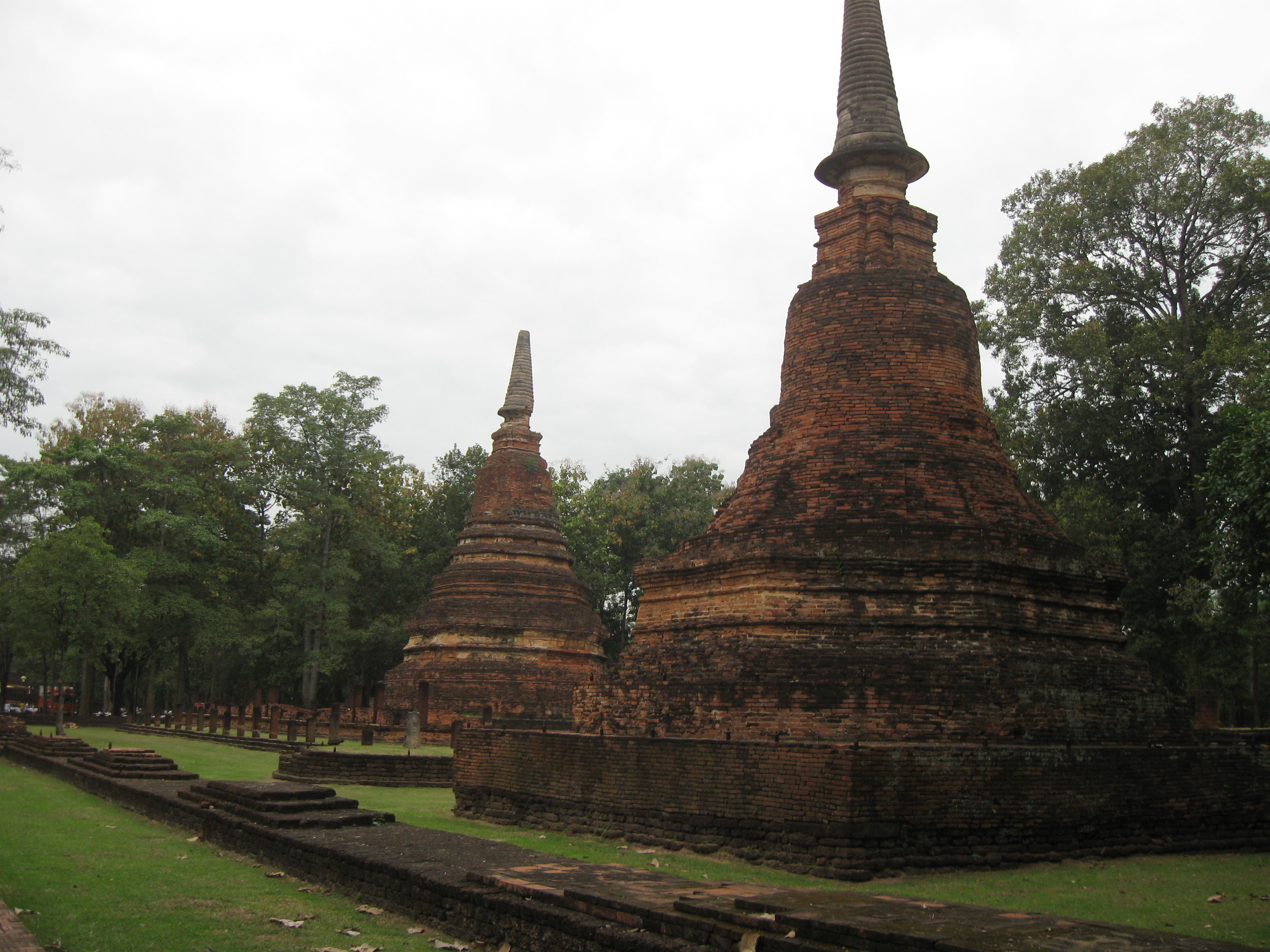

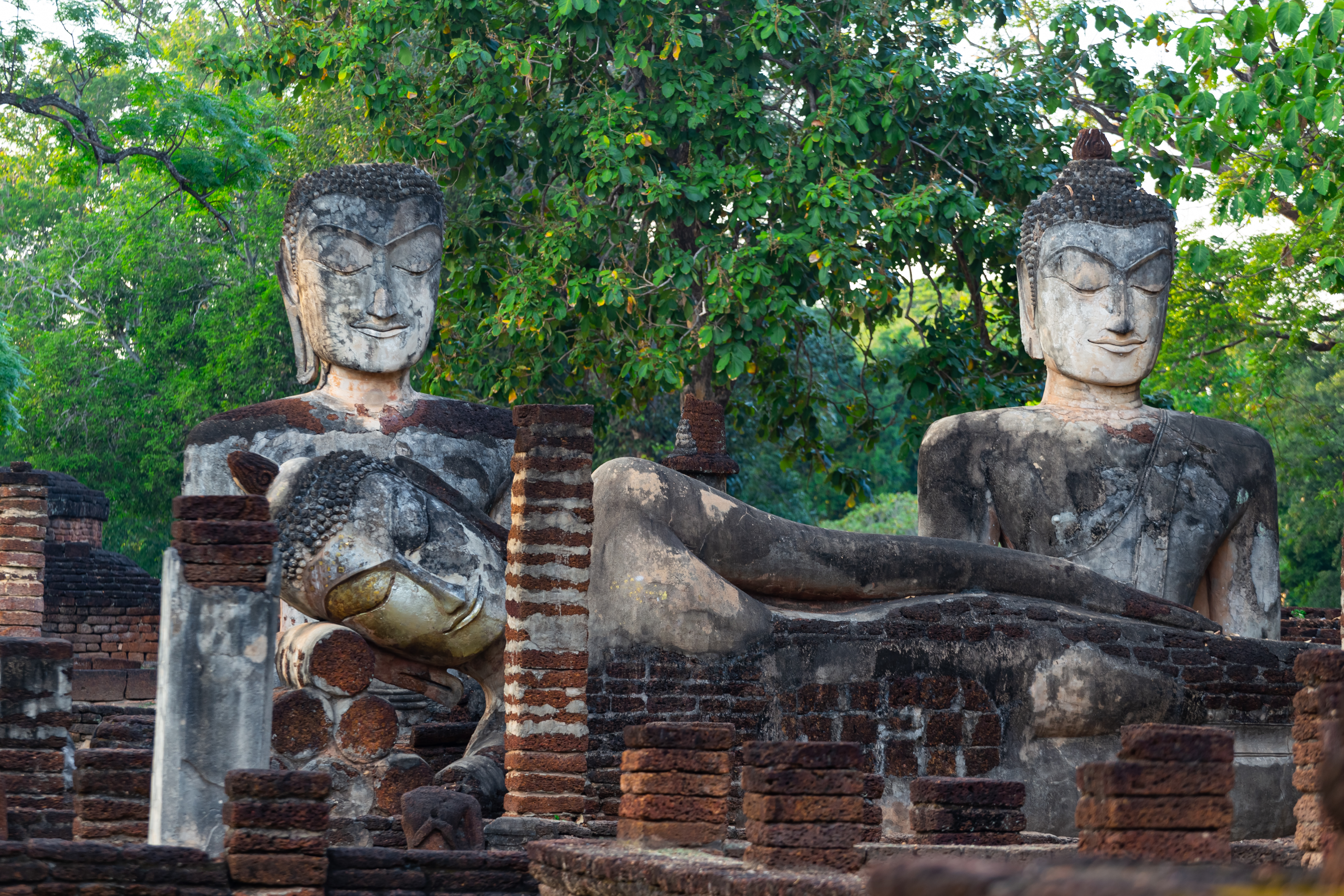

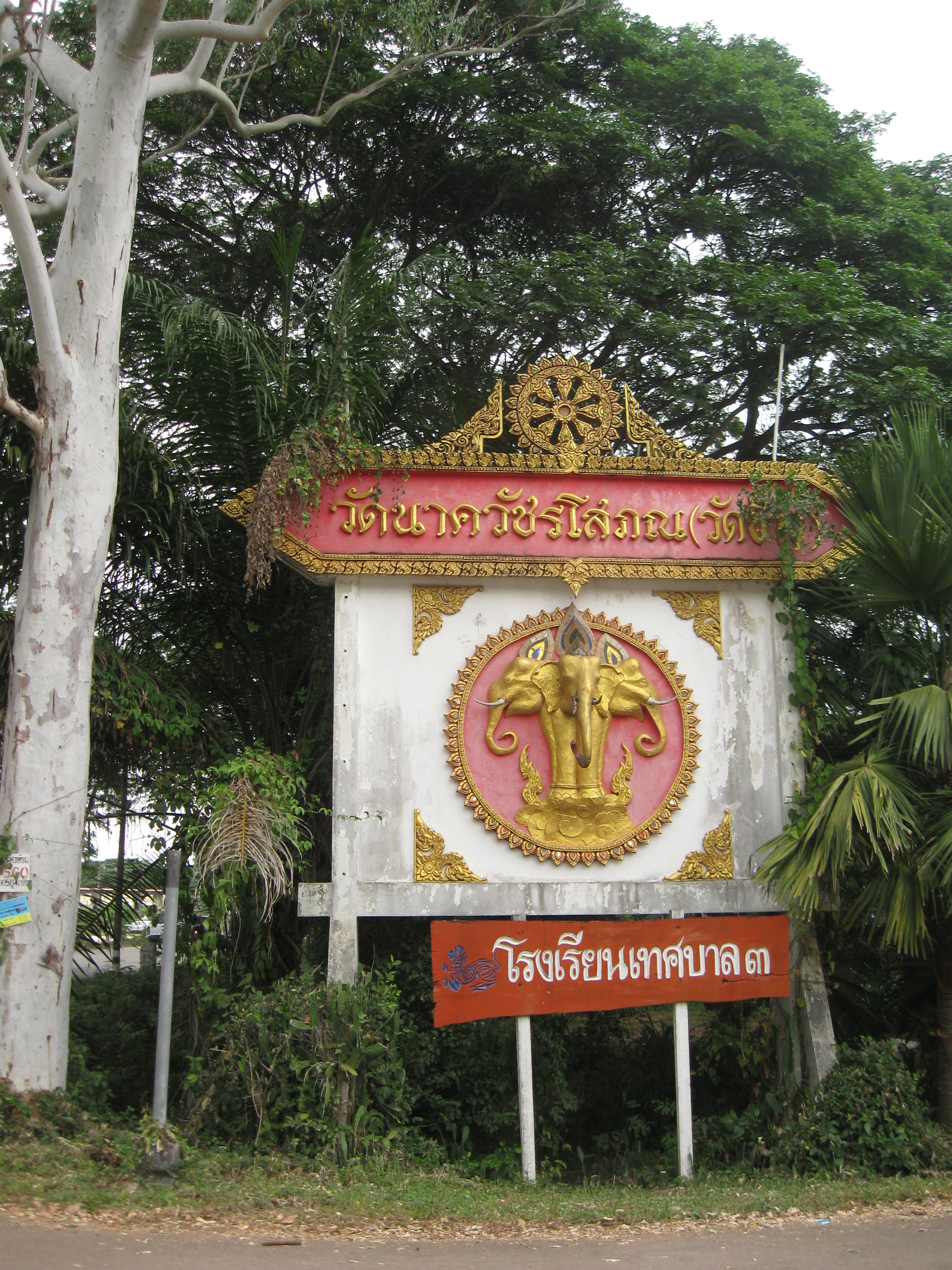

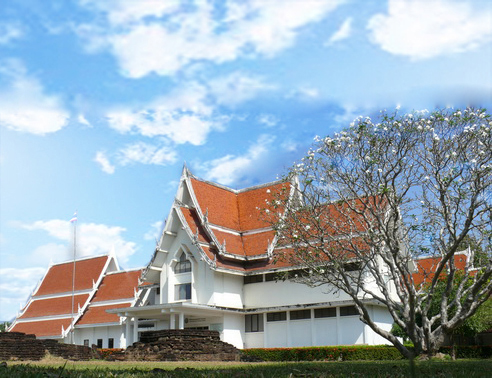
Kamphaeng Phet national museum

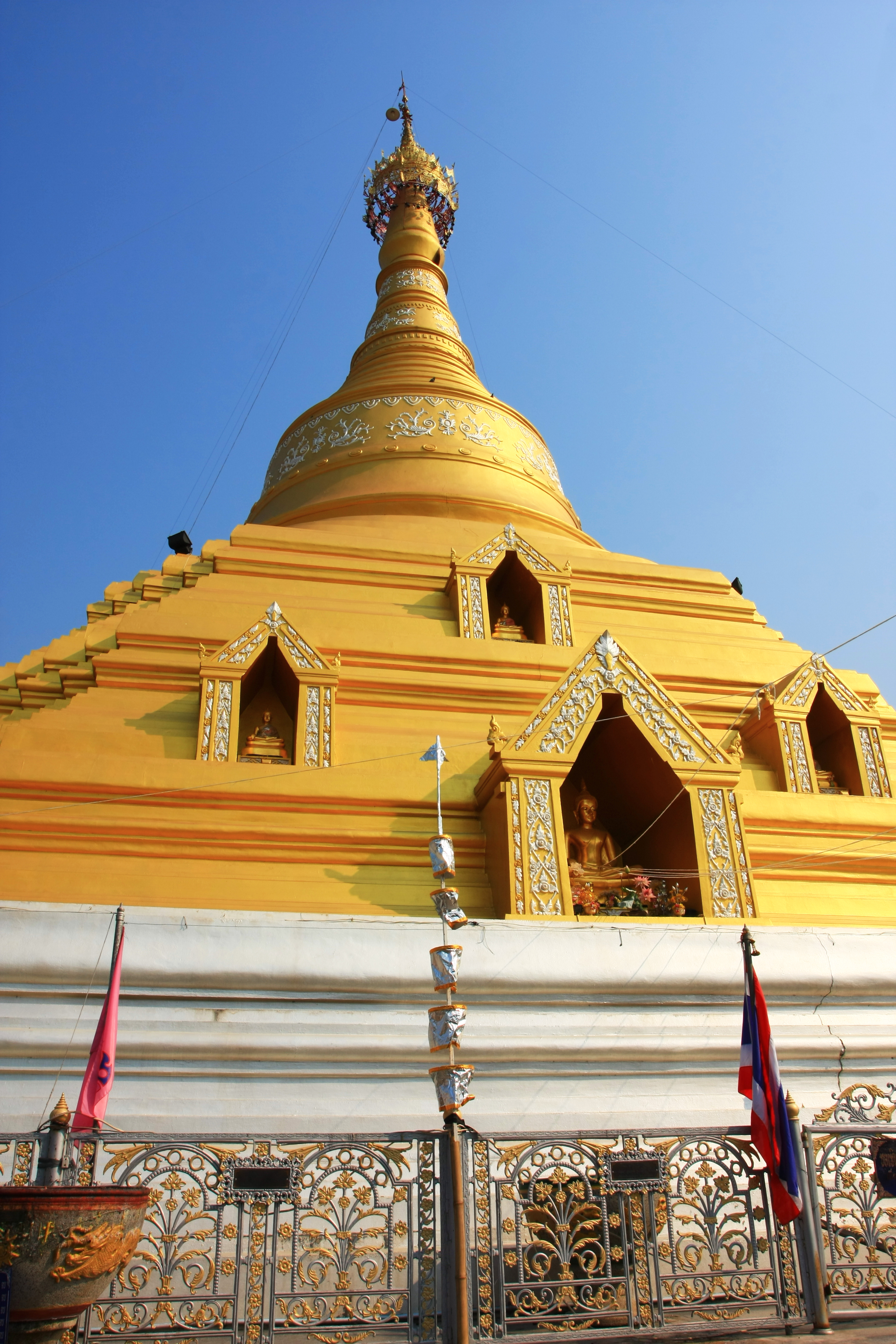
Wat Phra Borom That

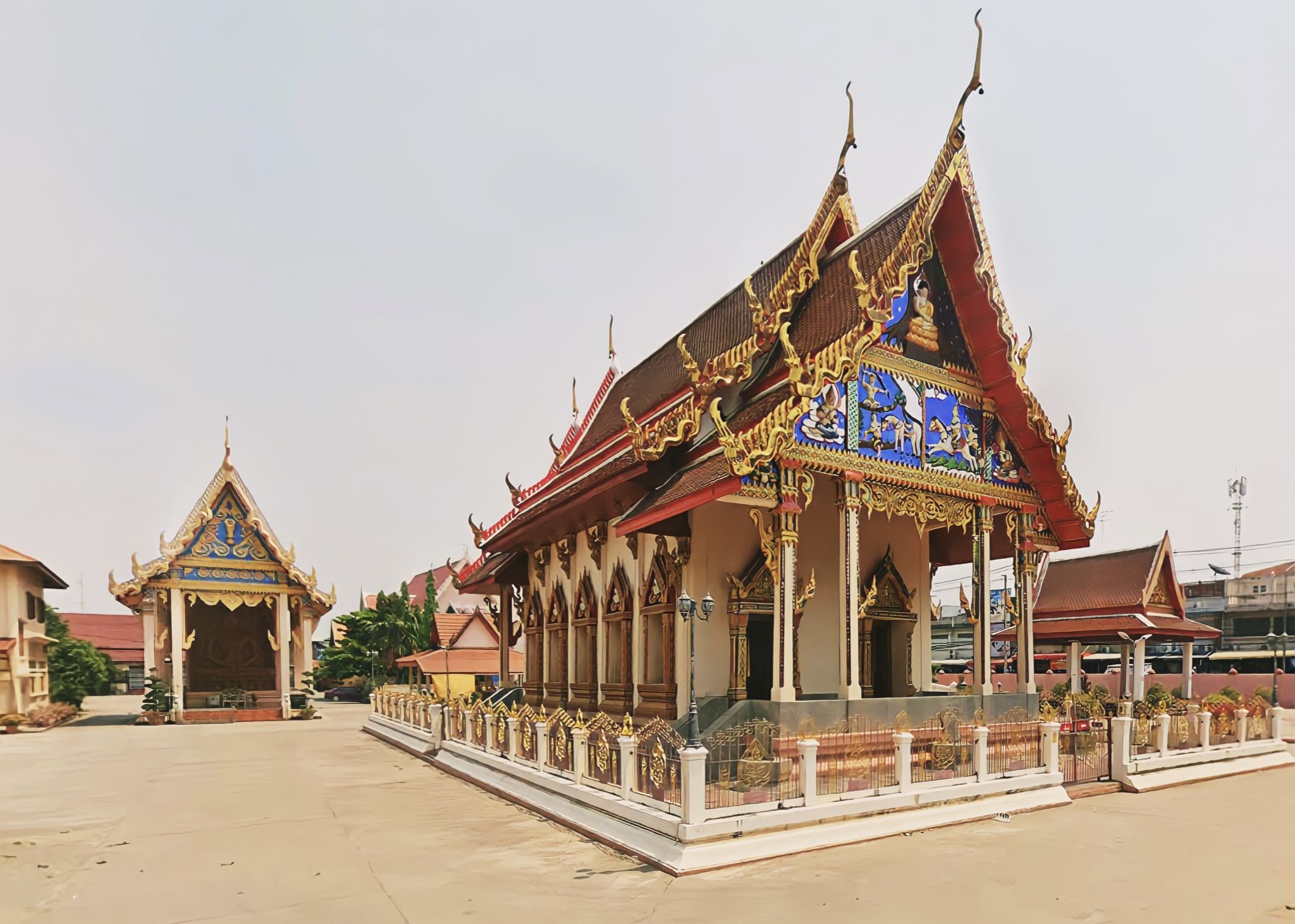
Wat Bang

== History ==
According to the Ayutthaya Testimonies, in 1156 a monarch of Xiān named Suryaraja moved his royal seat to Vicitraprakāra, identified with present-day Kamphaeng Phet. The town thus became the principal centre of his dominion. His successor and son, Candraraja, later moved the seat of power to Sukhothai, leaving Kamphaeng Phet a frontier stronghold of the kingdom.

Kamphaeng Phet was an ancient outpost town during the Sukhothai period, as evidenced by the city walls and fortifications that remain today. Legend gives two towns on the site before the present one, Chakangrao (ชากังราว) and Nakhon Chum (นครชุม). Chakangrao stood on the east bank of the Ping River and Nakhon Chum on the west. Prince Damrong Rajanubhab assigned the two names the other way. He surmised that the older town, on the west bank at the mouth of Khlong Suan Mak, was first called Chakangrao and took the name Nakhon Chum under the Phra Ruang dynasty. The walled town on the east bank, named Kamphaeng Phet, he held to be later, of the reign of Li Thai. He rested this on the absence of Kamphaeng Phet from any Sukhothai inscription, on Li Thai's inscription at Wat Mahathat calling the place Nakhon Chum, and on Ayutthayan law texts that pair Chakangrao with Kamphaeng Phet. He ranked the newer town as a royal capital or as a town held by a king's son, which he took to explain its palace. Piset Jiachanpong reads the east-bank town as an Ayutthayan foundation placed against Nakhon Chum. On his account it stood on high ground, clear of the flooding that troubled the older town, and could be supplied by river from the lower Chao Phraya. Nakhon Chum's people may on that reading have crossed over to settle there.

Borommarachathirat I of Ayutthaya attacked Chakangrao four times between 1376 and 1388. Tomé Pires, writing early in the 16th century, described the town's governor as a viceroy who within his own territory stood like the king of the land. Chairacha had the governor, Phraya Narai, executed there in 1538, and Bayinnaung took the town in 1563 before moving against Phitsanulok.

A bronze image of Śiva was cast for the town in 1510. Pierre Baptiste reports that the dedicatory inscription on the statue names the donor as Śrī Dharmāśokarāja, a prince of Kamphaeng Phet, and gives the date of casting. Baptiste notes that the attribution of the group of Hindu bronzes to which it belongs has been disputed since 1895, with proposed dates running from the mid-14th to the mid-18th century.

Kamphaeng Phet received municipality status on March 11, 1936. At its establishment it covered 4.5 square kilometers. Later in 1966, it expanded to an area of 14.9 square kilometers.

== Demographics ==
Since 2005, the population of Kamphaeng Phet has been decreasing.

Estimation date	31 Dec 2005	31 Dec 2010	31 Dec 2015	31 Dec 2019
Population	30,114	29,374	29,191	28,817

== Climate ==
Climate data for Kamphaeng Phet (1991–2020, extremes 1981-present)
Month	Jan	Feb	Mar	Apr	May	Jun	Jul	Aug	Sep	Oct	Nov	Dec	Year
Record high °C (°F)	37.0 (98.6)	39.8 (103.6)	40.8 (105.4)	44.0 (111.2)	43.6 (110.5)	39.6 (103.3)	38.0 (100.4)	37.8 (100.0)	36.2 (97.2)	37.0 (98.6)	36.5 (97.7)	35.4 (95.7)	44.0 (111.2)
Mean daily maximum °C (°F)	32.0 (89.6)	34.1 (93.4)	35.9 (96.6)	37.2 (99.0)	35.5 (95.9)	33.9 (93.0)	33.1 (91.6)	32.7 (90.9)	32.8 (91.0)	32.4 (90.3)	32.1 (89.8)	31.2 (88.2)	33.6 (92.4)
Daily mean °C (°F)	24.9 (76.8)	26.8 (80.2)	28.9 (84.0)	30.6 (87.1)	29.6 (85.3)	28.7 (83.7)	28.2 (82.8)	27.9 (82.2)	27.9 (82.2)	27.5 (81.5)	26.4 (79.5)	24.6 (76.3)	27.7 (81.8)
Mean daily minimum °C (°F)	19.1 (66.4)	20.5 (68.9)	23.0 (73.4)	25.1 (77.2)	25.5 (77.9)	25.4 (77.7)	25.1 (77.2)	24.9 (76.8)	24.7 (76.5)	24.0 (75.2)	22.0 (71.6)	19.5 (67.1)	23.2 (73.8)
Record low °C (°F)	10.1 (50.2)	10.5 (50.9)	14.8 (58.6)	18.4 (65.1)	20.8 (69.4)	22.3 (72.1)	21.4 (70.5)	22.5 (72.5)	21.6 (70.9)	17.0 (62.6)	12.6 (54.7)	8.2 (46.8)	8.2 (46.8)
Average precipitation mm (inches)	5.3 (0.21)	12.8 (0.50)	40.4 (1.59)	56.2 (2.21)	191.1 (7.52)	157.2 (6.19)	175.8 (6.92)	180.3 (7.10)	268.0 (10.55)	166.3 (6.55)	27.5 (1.08)	8.7 (0.34)	1,289.6 (50.77)
Average precipitation days (≥ 1.0 mm)	1.0	1.4	3.0	3.9	11.7	12.7	14.2	15.4	15.7	10.9	2.9	0.8	93.6
Average relative humidity (%)	70.6	66.0	65.5	66.0	75.1	80.6	81.6	83.5	84.0	82.9	77.8	73.2	75.6
Average dew point °C (°F)	18.5 (65.3)	19.1 (66.4)	21.0 (69.8)	22.7 (72.9)	24.2 (75.6)	24.7 (76.5)	24.5 (76.1)	24.6 (76.3)	24.7 (76.5)	24.0 (75.2)	21.8 (71.2)	19.0 (66.2)	22.4 (72.3)
Mean monthly sunshine hours	257.3	243.0	238.7	243.0	198.4	156.0	120.9	117.8	144.0	179.8	219.0	257.3	2,375.2
Mean daily sunshine hours	8.3	8.6	7.7	8.1	6.4	5.2	3.9	3.8	4.8	5.8	7.3	8.3	6.5
Source 1: World Meteorological Organization
Source 2: Office of Water Management and Hydrology, Royal Irrigation Department (sun 1981–2010)(extremes)

== See also ==
- Mueang Kamphaeng Phet District
- Kamphaeng Phet Province
- Kamphaeng Phet Historical Park
