= Phayao Provincial Administrative Organization Stadium =

Stadium in Thailand

- Interactive map of Phayao Provincial Administrative Organization Stadium
- Location: Phayao, Thailand
- Coordinates: 19°09′22″N 99°58′22″E
- Capacity: 2,406
- Surface: Grass

Tenant
- Rongseemaechaithanachotiwat Phayao

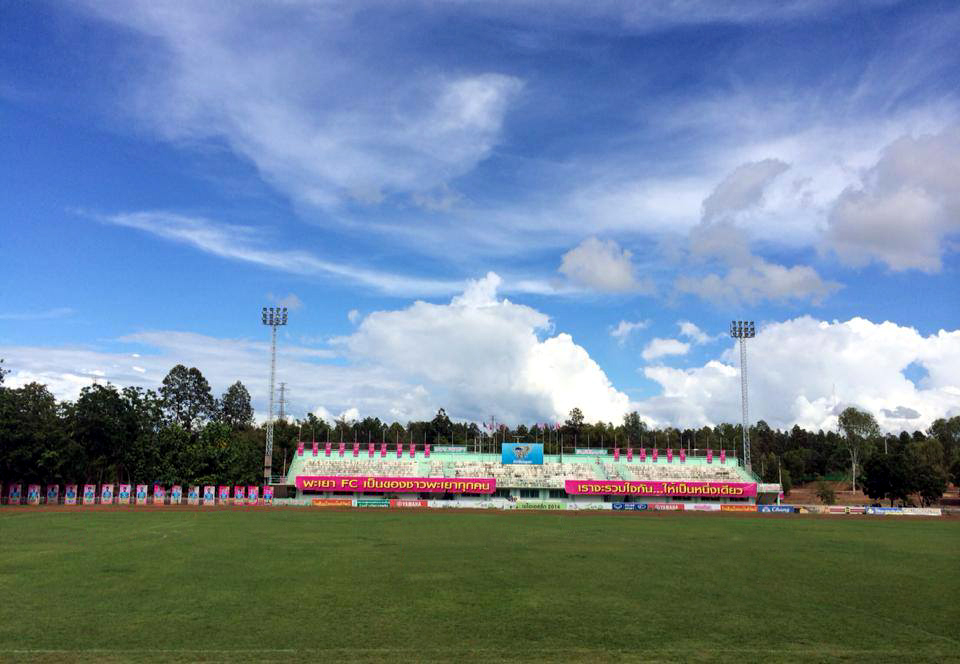
Phayao Provincial Administrative Organization Stadium.jpg

Phayao Provincial Administrative Organization Stadium or Phayao Province Stadium (Thai: สนาม อบจ.พะเยา หรือ สนามกีฬา จ.พะเยา) is a multi-purpose stadium in Phayao Province, Thailand. It is currently used mostly for football matches and is the home stadium of Phayao F.C. The stadium holds 2,406 people.
