= Kamphaeng Phet Provincial Administrative Organization Stadium =

Sports venue in Thailand

Kamphaeng phet Provincial Administrative Organization Stadium
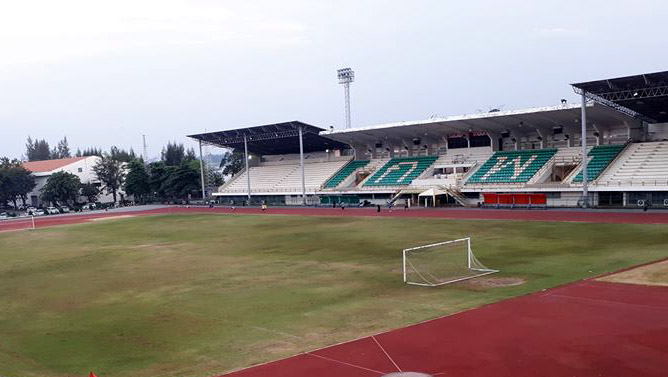
- Interactive map of Kamphaeng phet Provincial Administrative Organization Stadium
- Location: Kamphaeng Phet, Thailand
- Coordinates: 16°28′39″N 99°31′17″E
- Capacity: 2,406
- Surface: Grass

Tenant
- Kamphaeng Phet F.C.

Kamphaengphet Provincial Administrative Organization Stadium or Cha Kung Rao Stadium (Thai: สนาม อบจ.กำแพงเพชร หรือ สนามกีฬาจังหวัดกำแพงเพชร (ชากังราว)) is a multi-purpose stadium in Kamphaeng Phet Province, Thailand. It is currently used mostly for football matches and is the home stadium of Kamphaeng Phet F.C. The stadium holds 2,406 people.
