= Phetchabun =

Phetchabun เพชรบูรณ์
- Town
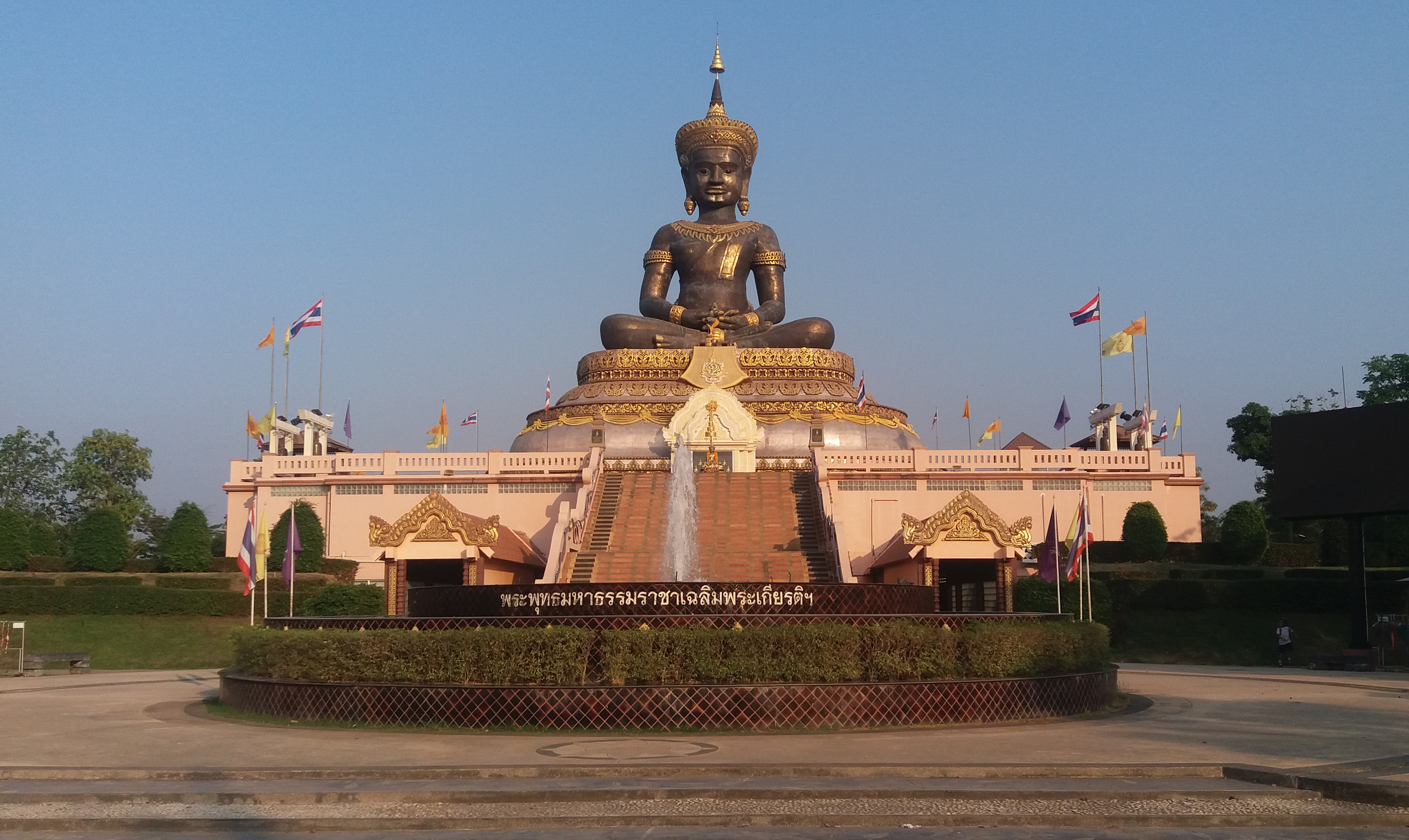
- Phra Phuttha Maha Thammaracha

- Location within Thailand
- Coordinates: 16°25′1″N 101°9′12″E
- Country: Thailand
- Provinces: Phetchabun Province
- District: Mueang Phetchabun District
- Elevation: 120 m (390 ft)

Population (2005)
  - Total: 23,823
- Time zone: UTC+7 (ICT)
- Website: http://www.nakornban.net/

Phetchabun is a town (thesaban mueang) in Thailand, the capital of Phetchabun Province. It covers the tambon Nai Mueang of the Phetchabun District, along the Pa Sak River. As of 2005, it had a population of 23,823. Phetchabun lies 340 km (210 mi) north of Bangkok.

== Etymology ==
From historical evidence, it is believed that Phetchabun was established by two kingdoms, the Sukhothai Kingdom and the Ayutthaya Period of King Narai. Initially the province was called "Phe-cha-buth" as "Phuenchapura", which means 'town that grows plenty of crops', as the province is very fertile.

== Geography ==
The Pa Sak River runs through the east side of Phetchabun from north to south. The town lies in a valley; the two ranges of the Phetchabun Mountains rise to both the east and west.

== Climate ==
Phetchabun has a tropical savanna climate (Köppen climate classification Aw). Winters are dry and very warm. Temperatures rise until April, which is very hot with the average daily maximum at 37.2 °C (99.0 °F). The monsoon season runs from late April through early October, with heavy rain and somewhat cooler temperatures during the day, with nights remaining warm.

Climate data for Phetchabun (1991–2020, extremes 1951-present)
Month	Jan	Feb	Mar	Apr	May	Jun	Jul	Aug	Sep	Oct	Nov	Dec	Year
Record high °C (°F)	37.6 (99.7)	39.5 (103.1)	42.2 (108.0)	44.1 (111.4)	43.4 (110.1)	39.9 (103.8)	37.8 (100.0)	36.5 (97.7)	37.2 (99.0)	35.9 (96.6)	37.3 (99.1)	36.6 (97.9)	44.1 (111.4)
Mean daily maximum °C (°F)	32.5 (90.5)	34.7 (94.5)	36.7 (98.1)	37.6 (99.7)	35.5 (95.9)	34.1 (93.4)	32.9 (91.2)	32.3 (90.1)	32.5 (90.5)	32.8 (91.0)	32.7 (90.9)	31.7 (89.1)	33.8 (92.9)
Daily mean °C (°F)	24.6 (76.3)	26.5 (79.7)	28.9 (84.0)	30.1 (86.2)	29.1 (84.4)	28.7 (83.7)	27.9 (82.2)	27.5 (81.5)	27.4 (81.3)	27.2 (81.0)	26.1 (79.0)	24.4 (75.9)	27.4 (81.3)
Mean daily minimum °C (°F)	18.2 (64.8)	19.9 (67.8)	22.7 (72.9)	24.6 (76.3)	24.9 (76.8)	24.8 (76.6)	24.4 (75.9)	24.3 (75.7)	24.2 (75.6)	23.2 (73.8)	20.8 (69.4)	18.4 (65.1)	22.5 (72.6)
Record low °C (°F)	2.0 (35.6)	8.5 (47.3)	12.1 (53.8)	18.1 (64.6)	21.4 (70.5)	22.0 (71.6)	21.5 (70.7)	21.7 (71.1)	19.6 (67.3)	14.6 (58.3)	7.9 (46.2)	5.1 (41.2)	2.0 (35.6)
Average precipitation mm (inches)	10.8 (0.43)	15.4 (0.61)	50.7 (2.00)	76.1 (3.00)	168.0 (6.61)	141.2 (5.56)	160.1 (6.30)	213.4 (8.40)	210.0 (8.27)	80.5 (3.17)	12.0 (0.47)	8.9 (0.35)	1,147.1 (45.16)
Average precipitation days (≥ 1.0 mm)	1.1	1.2	3.3	6.1	12.4	12.5	14.6	16.3	14.5	7.2	1.5	0.8	91.5
Average relative humidity (%)	74.4	76.2	77.5	76.2	76.1	75.7	76.3	76.4	79.8	81.5	75.9	71.9	76.5
Mean monthly sunshine hours	257.3	243.0	275.9	243.0	158.1	117.0	120.9	117.8	108.0	198.4	252.0	275.9	2,367.3
Mean daily sunshine hours	8.3	8.6	8.9	8.1	5.1	3.9	3.9	3.8	3.6	6.4	8.4	8.9	6.5
Source 1: World Meteorological Organization
Source 2: Office of Water Management and Hydrology, Royal Irrigation Department (sun 1981–2010)(extremes)

== Transportation ==
The main road through the city is Route 21, from Lom Sak to the south through Phetchabun to Chai Badan and Saraburi.

Phetchabun is served by Phetchabun Airport, 29 kilometres (18 mi) to the north.

== Notable people ==
- Saiphin Moore, Thai chef
