= 2021–22 Thai League Cup =

Hilux Revo League Cup

Tournament details
- Country: Thailand
- Dates: 13 October 2021 – 29 May 2022
- Teams: 75

Final positions
- Champions: Buriram United (6th title)
- Runners-up: PT Prachuap

Tournament statistics
- Matches played: 74
- Goals scored: 240 (3.24 per match)
- Top goal scorer(s): Ricardo Santos (6 goals)

Awards
- Best player: Jonathan Bolingi

The 2021–22 Thai League Cup is the 12th season in the second era of a Thailand's knockout football competition. All games are played as a single match. It was sponsored by Toyota Motor Thailand, and known as the Hilux Revo League Cup (Thai: ไฮลักซ์ รีโว่ ลีกคัพ) for sponsorship purposes, Hilux Revo is a truck model of Toyota. 75 clubs were accepted into the tournament, and it began with the first qualification round on 13 October 2021 and concluded with the final on 29 May 2022. The tournament has been readmitted back into Thai football after a 10-year absence. The prize money for this prestigious award is said to be around 5 million baht and the runners-up will be netting 1 million baht.

This is the first edition of the competition and the qualifying round will be played in regions featuring clubs from the Thai League 3.

== Calendar ==
Round	Date	Matches	Clubs	New entries this round
First qualification round	13 October 2021	7	14 → 7	14 2021–22 Thai League 3
Second qualification round	20 October 2021	20	7 + 33 → 20	33 2021–22 Thai League 3
Qualification play-off round	3–24 November 2021	16	20 + 12 → 16	12 2021–22 Thai League 2
First round	12 January 2022	16	16 + 16 → 16	16 2021–22 Thai League 1
Second round	9 February 2022	8	16 → 8	
Quarter-finals	12–13 March and 8 May 2022	4	8 → 4	
Semi-finals	25 May 2022	2	4 → 2	
Final	29 May 2022	1	2 → Champions	
Total				75 clubs

== Results ==
Note: T1: Clubs from Thai League 1; T2: Clubs from Thai League 2; T3: Clubs from Thai League 3.

=== First qualification round ===
There were 14 clubs from 2021–22 Thai League 3 have signed to first qualifying in the 2021–22 Thai League cup. This round had drawn on 28 September 2021. There are 21 goals that occurred in this round.

Northeastern region
The qualifying round would be played in the northeastern region featuring 4 clubs from the 2021–22 Thai League 3 Northeastern Region.

13 October 2021	Sisaket United (T3)	0–1	Muang Loei United (T3)	Mueang, Sisaket
15:00 (UTC+7)		Report	Phakhawat Poonachang 23'	Stadium: Sri Nakhon Lamduan Stadium; Attendance: 0 Referee: Worawut Chatipa; Assistant referees: Chinnawat Kottai, Adisak Noktajan; Fourth official: Sittichai Saramai

13 October 2021	Khon Kaen Mordindang (T3)	0–1	Udon United (T3)	Mueang, Khon Kaen
15:00 (UTC+7)		Report	Célio Guilherme da Silva Santos 23'	Stadium: Stadium of Khon Kaen University; Attendance: 0 Referee: Natthaphon Khodkaew; Assistant referees: Waratchanon Chombun, Ittipon Homdee; Fourth official: Jarin Yawapee

Eastern region
The qualifying round would be played in the eastern region featuring 4 clubs from the 2021–22 Thai League 3 Eastern Region.

13 October 2021	Banbueng (T3)	1–1 (a.e.t.) (3–4 p)	Pattaya Dolphins United (T3)	Banbueng, Chonburi
15:00 (UTC+7)	Sirisak Musbu-ngor 51' (pen.)	Report	Piya Kruawan 10'	Stadium: Chang Football Park Stadium; Attendance: 258; Referee: Kamphol Kaewsaard; Assistant referees: Chaiwat Rupsa-at, Theerayut Radarit; Fourth official: Somruethai Kongkairat
	Penalties
	Phanthamit Praphanth (penalty scored); Nachanok Klinhom (penalty scored); Kaittisak Chaiyasing (penalty scored); Chaiwat Ritthisak (penalty missed); Sirisak Musbu-ngor (penalty missed)		(penalty scored) Sirakorn Pimbaotham; (penalty scored) Suphakij Niamkong; (penalty scored) Noptassanon Namnuad; (penalty scored) Sirapop Saardeim

13 October 2021	Royal Thai Fleet (T3)	0–2	ACDC (T3)	Sattahip, Chonburi
15:00 (UTC+7)		Report	Thiraphat Nunsuk 68', 70'	Stadium: Battleship Stadium; Attendance: 0 Referee: Booncharoen Phochai; Assistant referees: Anuwat Nilprapat, Narinsak Thongkham; Fourth official: Suknipon Yuennan

Western region
The qualifying round would be played in the western region featuring 2 clubs from the 2021–22 Thai League 3 Western Region.

13 October 2021	Chainat United (T3)	2–1	Thawi Watthana Samut Sakhon United (T3)	Nong Mamong, Chainat
15:00 (UTC+7)	Thanapol Vetchaya 7'; Vorraseth Saichan 81'	Report	Henri Jöel 22' (o.g.)	Stadium: Nong Mamong Stadium; Attendance: 0 Referee: Arun Budtasee; Assistant referees: Peerapat Jumruspong, Prakrit Tanakat; Fourth official: Saravut Suksalee

Southern region
The qualifying round would be played in the southern region featuring 4 clubs from the 2021–22 Thai League 3 Southern Region.

13 October 2021	Phatthalung (T3)	2–5	Satun United (T3)	Mueang, Phatthalung
15:00 (UTC+7)	Tawatchai Chaiyos 85'; Anucha Liankattawa 90+5'	Report	Muhammad Limapichatsakul 20', 47'; Suppasan Sosanui 23', 45'; Nattawut Yayaman 81'	Stadium: Phatthalung Provincial Stadium; Attendance: 0 Referee: Pissanusak Sriyai; Assistant referees: Panuwat Chumming, Pornchai Anupan; Fourth official: Tiwakorn Sawangpong

13 October 2021	Pattani (T3)	2–3	Songkhla (T3)	Mueang, Pattani
16:00 (UTC+7)	Rushdan Katemmadee 37'; Chakris Ti-aiadyo 52'	Report	Mairon Natan Pereira Maciel Oliveira 18' (pen.); Siriwat Sinturak 40'; Peerapat Kantha 88'	Stadium: Pattani Provincial Stadium; Attendance: 0 Referee: Pornsak Paksan; Assistant referees: Wisarut Damthaklong, Heesham Doloh; Fourth official: Surachai Thasan

=== Second qualification round ===
The second qualifying round would be featured 7 clubs that were the winners of the first qualification round and the new entries that were 33 clubs from the 2021–22 Thai League 3. There are 67 goals that occurred in this round.

Northern region
The qualifying round would be played in the northern region featuring 6 clubs from the 2021–22 Thai League 3 Northern Region.

20 October 2021	Chiangrai Lanna (T3)	0–10	Uthai Thani (T3)	Mueang, Chiangrai
15:00 (UTC+7)		Report	Ricardo Santos 6', 53'; Suphawit Chusaksakunviboon 9'; Watcharakorn Manoworn 13'; Peemwit Thongnitiroj 16', 33'; Nontapat Naksawat 43', 67'; Phattharaphon Junsuwan 51'; Mongkol Tossakrai 73'	Stadium: Chiangrai Provincial Stadium; Attendance: 0 Referee: Sirikron Lorboon; Assistant referees: Nonthanan Khanthawong, Jackkrit Meekru; Fourth official: Bongkod Tiansavang

20 October 2021	See Khwae City (T3)	2–7	Kamphaengphet (T3)	Wat Bot, Phitsanulok
15:00 (UTC+7)	Diego Silva 9'; Julius Chukwuma Ononiwu 89'	Report	Mommod Bokir Oglu Mammad 10'; Teerapong Sopha 21'; Kawin Nuanthat 32'; Rômullo da Silva Cardoso 45+1' (pen.), 63'; Lucas Cunha da Costa 51'; Siwapong Thumchimplee 79'	Stadium: H2H Sport Stadium; Attendance: 0 Referee: Opars Oomsomsuai; Assistant referees: Samart Thongdonngao, Thanaporn Ouicharoen; Fourth official: Suchin Khewsopa

20 October 2021	Northern Tak United (T3)	0–1 (a.e.t.)	Phitsanulok (T3)	Mueang, Phitsanulok
15:00 (UTC+7)		Report	Saran Srideth 107'	Stadium: Phitsanulok PAO. Stadium; Attendance: 144; Referee: Thanison Onjiw; Assistant referees: Khachonphong Singthana, Chaiwat Mukda; Fourth official: Nattawut Pornchaiwirun

Northeastern region
The qualifying round would be played in the northeastern region featuring 6 clubs from the 2021–22 Thai League 3 Northeastern Region.

20 October 2021	Mahasarakham (T3)	1–1 (a.e.t.) (5–3 p)	Surin Khong Chee Mool (T3)	Mueang, Mahasarakham
15:00 (UTC+7)	Sansern Nanthasaen 115'	Report	Cheewan Wandee 92'	Stadium: Mahasarakham Provincial Stadium; Attendance: 228; Referee: Phaithun Onkhamloon; Assistant referees: Theerapong Baokham, Songphon Panthai; Fourth official: Sutiwat Kaewkhunthong
	Penalties
	Nonthawat Chari (penalty scored); Sansern Nanthasaen (penalty scored); Watin Phinyalak (penalty scored); Nitipong Ruangsa (penalty scored); Surawut Tarnparsert (penalty scored)		(penalty scored) Anuchit Ngamphaeng; (penalty scored) Chayapon Udornpan; (penalty scored) Phongsapak Somkam; (penalty missed) Adisorn Bunloet

20 October 2021	Sisaket (T3)	0–1	Nakhon Ratchasima United (T3)	Mueang, Sisaket
15:00 (UTC+7)		Report	Nattapong Yimpradid 85'	Stadium: Sri Nakhon Lamduan Stadium; Attendance: 0 Referee: Nattapong Wadweangcom; Assistant referees: Chinnawat Kottai, Nattipong Jaimuang; Fourth official: Wachira Promtanjai

20 October 2021	Udon United (T3)	0–2	Muang Loei United (T3)	Mueang, Udon Thani
15:00 (UTC+7)		Report	Tanapat Waempracha 37'; Partchya Katethip 90'	Stadium: Stadium of Thailand National Sports University, Udon Thani Campus; Attendance: 236; Referee: Somporn Rachdee; Assistant referees: Kitsada Fromthaisong, Waratchanon Chombun; Fourth official: Ponlakrit Wangkoon

Eastern region
The qualifying round would be played in the eastern region featuring 8 clubs from the 2021–22 Thai League 3 Eastern Region.

20 October 2021	Pluakdaeng United (T3)	3–0	Saimit Kabin United (T3)	Pluakdaeng, Rayong
15:00 (UTC+7)	Leonardo Martín Ferrari 48'; Chaiwat Thaewkrathok 70'; Prin Prathummet 73' (pen.)	Report		Stadium: CK Stadium; Attendance: 170; Referee: Pornthep Promsopa; Assistant referees: Narit Mungtoemklang, Pongsakorn Wisitsri; Fourth official: Panya Nawasimainam

20 October 2021	Marines Eureka (T3)	3–2 (a.e.t.)	Assawin Kohkwang United (T3)	Sattahip, Chonburi
15:00 (UTC+7)	Sutee Paosriphuak 13'; Sarayut Kiewpear 72'; Pongdusit Deewajin 120'	Report	Marlon Costa Santos Vieira de Araújo 9' (pen.); Bandit Nontasee 45'	Stadium: Sattahip Navy Stadium; Attendance: 100; Referee: Chaiyaporn Yongsang; Assistant referees: Anuwat Nilprapat, Chaiwat Rupsa-at; Fourth official: Anantip Phopan

20 October 2021	ACDC (T3)	4–3 (a.e.t.)	Pattaya Dolphins United (T3)	Sattahip, Chonburi
15:00 (UTC+7)	Denpum Saengchansiri 30'; Natchapol Jitkasem 38'; Anucha Phasupho 89'; Thiraphat Nunsuk 120'	Report	Suppasek Kaikaew 14'; Suphakij Niamkong 45'; Suksan Bunta 75'	Stadium: Battleship Stadium; Attendance: 0 Referee: Pichit Thongjanmoon; Assistant referees: Suknipon Yuennan, Opas Intaviset; Fourth official: Poomnapat Athan

20 October 2021	Chachoengsao Hi-Tek (T3)	1–0	Bankhai United (T3)	Mueang, Chachoengsao
18:00 (UTC+7)	Sarawut Choenchai 34'	Report		Stadium: Chachoengsao Municipality Stadium; Attendance: 137; Referee: Somsuk Poosomnuek; Assistant referees: Siravich Konngam, Puttipong Saensarn; Fourth official: Monruedee Junmai

Western region
The qualifying round would be played in the western region featuring 8 clubs from the 2021–22 Thai League 3 Western Region.

20 October 2021	Saraburi United (T3)	0–5	Kanchanaburi (T3)	Mueang, Saraburi
15:00 (UTC+7)		Report	Kento Nagasaki 29'; Natthawut Sukaram 67'; Anuluk Yeunhan 84', 90+5'; Diarra Junior Aboubacar 85'	Stadium: Saraburi Stadium; Attendance: 128; Referee: Virittpol Pluemsilp; Assistant referees: Thanet Jairaw, Yuranan Nukhao; Fourth official: Sujin Rodart

20 October 2021	Kanjanapat (T3)	1–0	Hua Hin City (T3)	Thanyaburi, Pathum Thani
15:00 (UTC+7)	Teerapong Malai 8'	Report		Stadium: Stadium of North Bangkok University; Attendance: 0 Referee: Ratthakhet Puttasorn; Assistant referees: Eakachai Polsuwan, Watcharapong Buasaeng; Fourth official: Kittichai Huthip

20 October 2021	Samut Songkhram (T3)	1–0	Pathumthani University (T3)	Mueang, Samut Songkhram
15:00 (UTC+7)	Watchrapong Amontirakul 56'	Report		Stadium: Samut Songkhram Stadium; Attendance: 0 Referee: Tawan Suriyawong; Assistant referees: Chanayut Kaiwijit, Kunathorn Ketchantra; Fourth official: Arun Budtasee

20 October 2021	Chainat United (T3)	3–1	Bang Pa-in Ayutthaya (T3)	Nong Mamong, Chainat
15:00 (UTC+7)	Theerawat Poolsat 10'; Thanapol Vetchaya 13'; Kritsana Jamniankarn 35'	Report	Thodsawat Aunkongrat 20'	Stadium: Nong Mamong Stadium; Attendance: 84; Referee: Yuttana Sadkrathok; Assistant referees: Jatupon Payuha, Theerapon Nonthakhamjan; Fourth official: Pichaya Kasem

Southern region
The qualifying round would be played in the southern region featuring 6 clubs from the 2021–22 Thai League 3 Southern Region.

20 October 2021	Krabi (T3)	2–1	Young Singh Hatyai United (T3)	Mueang, Krabi
15:00 (UTC+7)	Phuchakhen Chandaeng 32', 57'	Report	Taveechai Kliangklao 71'	Stadium: Krabi Provincial Stadium; Attendance: 0 Referee: Anwa Hayiyusoh; Assistant referees: Preecha Lanui, Iffan Phanwang; Fourth official: Samran Phaysam

20 October 2021	MH Khon Surat City (T3)	0–1	Nakhon Si United (T3)	Wiang Sa, Surat Thani
15:00 (UTC+7)		Report	Eakkaluk Lungnarm 82'	Stadium: Bansong Stadium; Attendance: 0 Referee: Nirut Suetrong; Assistant referees: Abdulrohim Sitiloh, Kachawit Kanchanaporn; Fourth official: Wichai Pannil

20 October 2021	Satun United (T3)	0–1	Songkhla (T3)	Mueang, Satun
15:00 (UTC+7)		Report	Mairon Natan Pereira Maciel Oliveira 84'	Stadium: Satun PAO. Stadium; Attendance: 290; Referee: Surachai Thasan; Assistant referees: Khusaifi Awae, Anas Poheng; Fourth official: Nattawut Sangpan

Bangkok metropolitan region
The qualifying round would be played in the Bangkok metropolitan region featuring 6 clubs from the 2021–22 Thai League 3 Bangkok Metropolitan Region.

20 October 2021	Prime Bangkok (T3)	3–1	Grakcu Sai Mai United (T3)	Minburi, Bangkok
15:00 (UTC+7)	Omae So 1'; Prasin Klaythongkam 13'; Methus Thongnueaha 88'	Report	Theppatat Wantanaboon 32'	Stadium: Stadium of Kasem Bundit University; Attendance: 0 Referee: Song Montha; Assistant referees: Natthakit Konfu, Weeraphong Chaiyasuk; Fourth official: Ammarin Sriyohajirachod

20 October 2021	Nonthaburi United S.Boonmeerit (T3)	2–0	Bangkok (T3)	Bang Yai, Nonthaburi
15:00 (UTC+7)	Zady Moise Gnenegbe 54'; Carlos Eduardo dos Santos Lima 59'	Report		Stadium: Nonthaburi Provincial Stadium; Attendance: 0 Referee: Waranon Soonsuwan; Assistant referees: Wutthinan Jampawai, Phanuwat Wachasen; Fourth official: Dassakhon Hokla

20 October 2021	Samut Prakan (T3)	2–2 (a.e.t.) (4–5 p)	Kasem Bundit University (T3)	Bang Sao Thong, Samut Prakan
15:00 (UTC+7)	Tepasin Mueangsuk 16'; Apisit Pangsuk 109'	Report	Theerasak Khamrangsee 10'; Pitsanu Punriboon 91'	Stadium: Samut Prakarn Stadium; Attendance: 22; Referee: Kriangkrai Thiphanunjarukorn; Assistant referees: Tibeth Longtree, Narakorn Sapsuksai; Fourth official: Trin Sahachaipat
	Penalties
	Julio Daniel Rivas Mendoza (penalty scored); Alexis Vaiani (penalty missed); Alan Rolando Gomez (penalty scored); Natthapat Wongsensuk (penalty scored); Jirawat Boonmak (penalty scored)		(penalty scored) Anusak Laosangthai; (penalty scored) Kroekpon Kaewmuean; (penalty scored) Suradech Thongchai; (penalty scored) Autthagowit Jantod; (penalty scored) Kourouma Mohamed

=== Qualification play-off round ===
The qualification play-off round would be featured 20 clubs that were the winners of the second qualification round and the new entries that were 12 clubs from the 2021–22 Thai League 2. This round had drawn on 21 October 2021. There are 63 goals that occurred in this round.

3 November 2021	Pluakdaeng United (T3)	2–0	Sukhothai (T2)	Pluakdaeng, Rayong
15:00 (UTC+7)	Kritthanaphong Paisanakkarapol 34'; Jakkarin Yaukyen 90+2'	Report		Stadium: CK Stadium; Attendance: 130; Referee: Wichate Tainthong; Assistant referees: Anucha Pinamon, Sarayut Sriampri; Fourth official: Putthipong Issising

3 November 2021	Kanchanaburi (T3)	3–3 (a.e.t.) (1–4 p)	Lamphun Warriors (T2)	Mueang, Kanchanaburi
15:00 (UTC+7)	Diarra Junior Aboubacar 90+1', 118'; Anuwat Matarat 110'	Report	Ronnachai Rangsiyo 10'; Tiago Chulapa 91'; Anan Yodsangwal 108'	Stadium: Kanchanaburi Municipality Stadium; Attendance: 245; Referee: Seksan Phansri; Assistant referees: Poramin Yoopensuk, Dumrongchai Chuangaroen; Fourth official: Somkhid Sarapim
	Penalties
	Kento Nagasaki (penalty scored); Pantakan Kasemkulwirai (penalty missed); Diarra Junior Aboubacar (penalty missed)		(penalty scored) Ronnachai Rangsiyo; (penalty scored) Wanmai Setthanan; (penalty scored) Tana Sripandorn; (penalty scored) Arthit Sunthornpit

3 November 2021	Nonthaburi United S.Boonmeerit (T3)	1–2	Muang Loei United (T3)	Bang Yai, Nonthaburi
15:00 (UTC+7)	Teerawut Churok 17'	Report	Phakhawat Poonachang 63'; Alexandre Balotelli 67'	Stadium: Nonthaburi Provincial Stadium; Attendance: 130; Referee: Narongsak Kubkun; Assistant referees: Anucha Kaewpasit, Sujin Rodart; Fourth official: Kunach Sanggoranee

3 November 2021	Nakhon Ratchasima United (T3)	2–1	Khon Kaen (T2)	Mueang, Nakhon Ratchasima
15:00 (UTC+7)	Narongkorn Buaphan 11'; Nattapong Yimpradid 90+3'	Report	Sahatsawat Arsachana 81' (pen.)	Stadium: Stadium of Nakhon Ratchasima Rajabhat University; Attendance: 49; Referee: Tawatchai Ngampod; Assistant referees: Narong Hansuk, Sadsampan Kunsakoo; Fourth official: Chaiya Moolmanee

3 November 2021	Chainat United (T3)	0–4	Lampang (T2)	Nong Mamong, Chainat
15:00 (UTC+7)		Report	Jakkrawut Songma 40', 77'; Deyvison Fernandes de Oliveira 66'; Jakkrit Songma 90'	Stadium: Nong Mamong Stadium; Attendance: 0 Referee: Manut Pimol; Assistant referees: Sahatnet Deemongkol, Supawan Hinthong; Fourth official: Anupong Duangsri

3 November 2021	Mahasarakham (T3)	1–4	Nakhon Si United (T3)	Mueang, Mahasarakham
15:00 (UTC+7)	Pitakpong Kulasuwan 29'	Report	Thaned Benyapad 13'; Nattapoom Maya 26'; Sattawas Inchareon 48'; Pornthep Heemla 90+4'	Stadium: Mahasarakham Provincial Stadium; Attendance: 384; Referee: Damrong Wangraha; Assistant referees: Surachai Thongudom, Watcharachat Loumpool; Fourth official: Worawut Chatipa

3 November 2021	Krabi (T3)	7–0	Kamphaengphet (T3)	Mueang, Krabi
15:00 (UTC+7)	Nicolás Abot 3', 42'; Anuwat Yungyuen 18'; Mohamed Samir 49', 73', 90+2' (pen.); Phuchakhen Chandaeng 82'	Report		Stadium: Krabi Provincial Stadium; Attendance: 0 Referee: Jiraphan Yodphut; Assistant referees: Abas Ngajeh, Chawalit Chaikaew; Fourth official: Suwit Kaewrod

3 November 2021	Kanjanapat (T3)	0–1	Phitsanulok (T3)	Thanyaburi, Pathum Thani
15:00 (UTC+7)		Report	Sitthipong Malai 69' (o.g.)	Stadium: Stadium of North Bangkok University; Attendance: 0 Referee: Niruch Panjontuk; Assistant referees: Authen Dansalao, Padsakorn Jaihom; Fourth official: Ammarin Sriyohajirachod

3 November 2021	Songkhla (T3)	6–1	Navy (T2)	Mueang, Songkhla
15:00 (UTC+7)	Nititorn Sripramarn 3', 54'; Peerapat Kantha 10'; Alberto Moreira Gouvea 14', 53'; Abdulhakim Cehsani 18'	Report	Suhaimi Matyadam 12'	Stadium: Tinsulanon Stadium; Attendance: 310; Referee: Phitsanu Chusi; Assistant referees: Hanyot Buangrab, Pornchai Kongdamni; Fourth official: Wichai Pannil

3 November 2021	ACDC (T3)	0–3	Rajpracha (T2)	Sattahip, Chonburi
15:00 (UTC+7)		Report	Douglas Mineiro 47'; Nattawut Namthip 84', 90+3'	Stadium: Battleship Stadium; Attendance: 0 Referee: Pongthep Raipimai; Assistant referees: Binla Preeda, Chaiyos Sripak; Fourth official: Ekkachai Phetcham

3 November 2021	Samut Songkhram (T3)	0–5	Nakhon Pathom United (T2)	Mueang, Samut Songkhram
15:00 (UTC+7)		Report	Osvaldo Nascimento dos Santos Neto 28' (pen.); Amir Ali Chegini 63'; Krissana Nontharak 74', 90+1'; Attapon Chommaleethanawat 90+6'	Stadium: Samut Songkhram Stadium; Attendance: 58; Referee: Pawara Seejen; Assistant referees: Siwat Chaithong, Wutthinan Jampawai; Fourth official: Boonsong Prachumrak

3 November 2021	Kasem Bundit University (T3)	0–2	Chainat Hornbill (T2)	Minburi, Bangkok
15:00 (UTC+7)		Report	Warayut Klomnak 11', 31'	Stadium: Stadium of Kasem Bundit University; Attendance: 0 Referee: Winai Kunyapan; Assistant referees: Kantrakorn Ngaosri, Sila Jinnigorn; Fourth official: Suriyo Kanhachalee

3 November 2021	Prime Bangkok (T3)	0–2	Kasetsart (T2)	Lam Luk Ka, Pathum Thani
15:00 (UTC+7)		Report	Raphael Success 70'; Worachai Jaoprakam 76'	Stadium: Thupatemi Stadium; Attendance: 0 Referee: Anon Borisut; Assistant referees: Suriya Lee-intr, Kriangsak Pimsanit; Fourth official: Komgrit Ponpasit

3 November 2021	Chachoengsao Hi-Tek (T3)	1–2	Rayong (T2)	Mueang, Chachoengsao
18:00 (UTC+7)	Kongpon Ployprapai 27'	Report	Jetsada Simmana 66'; Adisak Srikampang 70'	Stadium: Chachoengsao Municipality Stadium; Attendance: 321; Referee: Thapakorn Thongkon; Assistant referees: Arris Madpunjor, Jareon Nunboon; Fourth official: Phadoongkiat Piangdee

3 November 2021	Uthai Thani (T3)	0–0 (a.e.t.) (3–1 p)	Muangkan United (T2)	Mueang, Uthai Thani
18:00 (UTC+7)		Report		Stadium: Uthai Thani Provincial Stadium; Attendance: 621; Referee: Wirot Oupachit; Assistant referees: Songrit Trakulchai, Pramote Boon-in; Fourth official: Direk Kaort
	Penalties
	Ricardo Santos (penalty missed); Phattharaphon Junsuwan (penalty scored); Jakree Pankam (penalty scored); Narong Jansawek (penalty scored)		(penalty missed) Caion; (penalty missed) Koravit Namwiset; (penalty missed) Rachanon Kanyathong; (penalty scored) Jirattikan Vapilai

24 November 2021	Marines Eureka (T3)	2–8	Chiangmai (T2)	Sattahip, Chonburi
15:00 (UTC+7)	Chonlapat Singruang 51' (pen.); Puttipong Wongwan 57'	Report	Veljko Filipović 25'; Evgeni Kabaev 45+1', 63', 65', 81', 90+3'; Natithorn Inntranon 53'; Danilo 90'	Stadium: Sattahip Navy Stadium; Attendance: 120; Referee: Ekkachai Phetcham; Assistant referees: Chaiyos Sripak, Pakorn Srichumsin; Fourth official: Suriyo Kanhachalee

=== First round ===
The first round would be featured 16 clubs that were the winners of the qualification play-off round including 8 clubs from T2 and 8 clubs from T3 and the new entries that were 16 clubs from the 2021–22 Thai League 1. This round had drawn on 8 December 2021. There are 44 goals that occurred in this round.

12 January 2022	Pluakdaeng United (T3)	1–3	Samut Prakan City (T1)	Pluak Daeng, Rayong
15:00 (UTC+7)	Jakkarin Yaukyen 15'	Report; Highlight	Jiraaut Wingwon 33'; Phatsaphon Choedwichit 44', 68'	Stadium: CK Stadium; Attendance: 230; Referee: Torphong Somsing; Assistant referees: Phubes Lekpha, Kasama Loyma; Fourth official: Wichate Tainthong

12 January 2022	Nakhon Ratchasima United (T3)	1–3	Chiangmai United (T1)	Mueang, Nakhon Ratchasima
15:00 (UTC+7)	Tatree Seeha 44'	Report; Highlight	Baworn Tapla 5'; Yannick Boli 40'; Kabfah Boonmatoon 51'	Stadium: Stadium of Nakhon Ratchasima Rajabhat University; Attendance: 89; Referee: Sahapop Sriboonlue; Assistant referees: Rachan Dawangpa, Chaiya Sripak; Fourth official: Jirawit Phonkaew

12 January 2022	Krabi (T3)	3–2 (a.e.t.)	Suphanburi (T1)	Mueang, Krabi
15:00 (UTC+7)	Alexandre Balotelli 71'; Chudit Wanpraphao 94'; Koné Seydou 120'	Report; Highlight	Danilo Alves 62'; Lossémy Karaboué 100'	Stadium: Krabi Provincial Stadium; Attendance: 492; Referee: Paisan Bendem-alee; Assistant referees: Chotrawee Tongduang, Binla Preeda; Fourth official: Putthipong Issising

12 January 2022	Phitsanulok (T3)	1–2	Chiangrai United (T1)	Mueang, Phitsanulok
15:00 (UTC+7)	Naphat Thamrongsupakorn 15'	Report; Highlight	Sivakorn Tiatrakul 27'; Getterson 90+4'	Stadium: Phitsanulok PAO. Stadium; Attendance: 327; Referee: Tastarawut Khantavichai; Assistant referees: Vichet Getkaew, Narin Wongprapipak; Fourth official: Piyapong Thongkhain

12 January 2022	Muang Loei United (T3)	0–0 (a.e.t.) (6–5 p)	Port (T1)	Mueang, Loei
15:00 (UTC+7)		Report; Highlight		Stadium: Blue Dragon Mueang Loei Stadium; Attendance: 0 Referee: Vitsavet Sangnakorn; Assistant referees: Teerapon Sunyapluem, Srisuwan Boonnum; Fourth official: Natthwut Nammuang
	Penalties
	Tanapat Waempracha (penalty scored); Aphiwat Hanchai (penalty scored); Weerawat Jiraphaksiri (penalty missed); Amporn Chaipong (penalty scored); Tana Chanabut (penalty scored); Anatcha Thepsiri (penalty scored); Rachata Somporn (penalty scored)		(penalty missed) Charyl Chappuis; (penalty scored) Kanarin Thawornsak; (penalty scored) Jaturapat Sattham; (penalty scored) Philip Roller; (penalty scored) Pakorn Prempak; (penalty scored) Janepob Phokhi; (penalty missed) Siwakorn Jakkuprasat

12 January 2022	Nakhon Si United (T3)	1–2	Nongbua Pitchaya (T1)	Mueang, Nakhon Si Thammarat
15:00 (UTC+7)	Diego Silva 90+4'	Report; Highlight	Warakorn Thongbai 14'; Hamilton 69'	Stadium: Nakhon Si Thammarat Provincial Stadium; Attendance: 1,200; Referee: Phairot Bunkamnoed; Assistant referees: Yossapon Tongprom, Sarayut Sriampri; Fourth official: Phitsanu Chusi

12 January 2022	Lampang (T2)	0–0 (a.e.t.) (5–6 p)	Bangkok United (T1)	Mueang, Lampang
17:00 (UTC+7)		Report; Highlight		Stadium: Lampang Provincial Stadium; Attendance: 644; Referee: Natee Choosuwan; Assistant referees: Tanate Chuchuen, Kanchit Nittayachart; Fourth official: Peerasan Krataithong
	Penalties
	Wutthichai Marom (penalty scored); Kantapol Sompittayanurak (penalty scored); Kritsana Kasemkulvilai (penalty scored); Andrey Coutinho (penalty scored); Chawin Thirawatsri (penalty scored); Jakkrawut Songma (penalty missed)		(penalty scored) Tristan Do; (penalty scored) Thitiphan Puangchan; (penalty scored) Everton; (penalty scored) Manuel Bihr; (penalty scored) Anon Amornlerdsak; (penalty scored) Wisarut Imura

12 January 2022	Rajpracha (T2)	1–3	Ratchaburi Mitr Phol (T1)	Thanyaburi, Pathum Thani
17:00 (UTC+7)	Porncha Rodnakkaret 19'	Report; Highlight	Derley 56', 62'; Chanapach Buaphan 60' (o.g.)	Stadium: BG Stadium; Attendance: 0 Referee: Warintron Sassadee; Assistant referees: Kitisak Pikunngoen, Khomchalach Lekhawijit; Fourth official: Suriyo Kanhachalee

12 January 2022	Chiangmai (T2)	0–1	Chonburi (T1)	Mae Rim, Chiangmai
18:00 (UTC+7)		Report; Highlight	Yoo Byung-soo 81'	Stadium: 700th Anniversary of Chiangmai Stadium; Attendance: 714; Referee: Chaireag Ngam-som; Assistant referees: Worapong Prasartsri, Waranyoo Chomgoson; Fourth official: Direk Kaort

12 January 2022	Uthai Thani (T3)	1–0	Muangthong United (T1)	Mueang, Uthai Thani
18:00 (UTC+7)	Ricardo Santos 33'	Report; Highlight		Stadium: Uthai Thani Provincial Stadium; Attendance: 1,850; Referee: Kotchapoom Meesridaecha; Assistant referees: Apichit Nophuan, Sumate Peasiri; Fourth official: Wirot Oupachit

12 January 2022	Lamphun Warriors (T2)	1–2 (a.e.t.)	PT Prachuap (T1)	Mueang, Lamphun
18:00 (UTC+7)	Akarapong Pumwisat 67'	Report; Highlight	Ratchapol Nawanno 58'; Tanakorn Navanit 120+2' (o.g.)	Stadium: Lamphun Provincial Stadium; Attendance: 720; Referee: Sarayut Jakngoen; Assistant referees: Pattarapong Kijsathit, Tanin Reunjit; Fourth official: Woottipong Ketkam

12 January 2022	Kasetsart (T2)	1–2 (a.e.t.)	Khon Kaen United (T1)	Chatuchak, Bangkok
18:00 (UTC+7)	Sakunchai Saengthopho 79'	Report; Highlight	Thanapol Srithong 45'; Ibson Melo 120+2'	Stadium: Insee Chantarasatit Stadium; Attendance: 542; Referee: Winat Phophat; Assistant referees: Chaowalit Poonprasit, Watthana Chonchanakul; Fourth official: Suwat Wongsuwan

12 January 2022	Songkhla (T3)	1–4	BG Pathum United (T1)	Mueang, Songkhla
18:00 (UTC+7)	Mairon Natan Pereira Maciel Oliveira 32'	Report; Highlight	Ikhsan Fandi 11', 85'; Worachit Kanitsribampen 56'; Chaowat Veerachat 65'	Stadium: Tinsulanon Stadium; Attendance: 13,254; Referee: Sivakorn Pu-udom; Assistant referees: Rawut Nakarit, Tuwae-yusoh Kuji; Fourth official: Sapuding Kalong

12 January 2022	Rayong (T2)	0–2	Buriram United (T1)	Mueang, Rayong
19:00 (UTC+7)		Report; Highlight	Sasalak Haiprakhon 40'; Jonathan Bolingi 48'	Stadium: Rayong Provincial Stadium; Attendance: 1,219; Referee: Wiwat Jumpaoon; Assistant referees: Rachain Srichai, Natthaphon Mala; Fourth official: Akom Charoensuk

12 January 2022	Chainat Hornbill (T2)	2–1	Nakhon Ratchasima Mazda (T1)	Mueang, Chainat
19:00 (UTC+7)	Akkarapol Meesawat 45+2'; Badar Ali Rashid Ali Al Alawi 75'	Report; Highlight	Chalermpong Kerdkaew 57'	Stadium: Khao Plong Stadium; Attendance: 2,021; Referee: Noppadet Mangngam; Assistant referees: Banpot Khunhong, Kittipon Meeporn; Fourth official: Alongkorn Khonwai

12 January 2022	Nakhon Pathom United (T2)	1–2 (a.e.t.)	Police Tero (T1)	Mueang, Nakhon Pathom
19:00 (UTC+7)	Raungchai Choothongchai 103'	Report; Highlight	Isaac Honny 115'; Veerapat Nilburapha 120+3'	Stadium: Stadium of Nakhon Pathom Municipality Sport School; Attendance: 475; Referee: Songkran Bunmeekiart; Assistant referees: Poonsawat Samransuk, Wirot Lokham; Fourth official: Kristin Saisombat

=== Second round ===
The second round would be featured 16 clubs that were the winners of the first round including 12 clubs from T1, 1 club from T2, and 3 clubs from T3. This round had drawn on 18 January 2022. There are 27 goals that occurred in this round.

9 February 2022	Krabi (T3)	0–5	BG Pathum United (T1)	Mueang, Krabi
15:00 (UTC+7)		Report; Highlight	Nattaphon Worasut 45', 51'; Diogo 79', 90+3'; Sumanya Purisai 81'	Stadium: Krabi Provincial Stadium; Attendance: 2,853; Referee: Kotchapoom Meesridaecha; Assistant referees: Binla Preeda, Yossapon Tongprom; Fourth official: Sapuding Kalong

9 February 2022	Muang Loei United (T3)	1–3	Chonburi (T1)	Mueang, Loei
15:00 (UTC+7)	Nattapon Thaptanon 46'	Report; Highlight	Kroekrit Thaweekarn 44'; Dennis Murillo 89', 90+4'	Stadium: Blue Dragon Mueang Loei Stadium; Attendance: 365; Referee: Chaireag Ngam-som; Assistant referees: Worapong Prasartsri, Kanchit Nittayachart; Fourth official: Boonsong Prachumrak

9 February 2022	Uthai Thani (T3)	2–0 (a.e.t.)	Nongbua Pitchaya (T1)	Mueang, Uthai Thani
17:00 (UTC+7)	Ricardo Santos 94', 107' (pen.)	Report; Highlight		Stadium: Uthai Thani Provincial Stadium; Attendance: 627; Referee: Torphong Somsing; Assistant referees: Apichit Nophuan, Narin Wongprapipak; Fourth official: Panumas Phansamo

9 February 2022	Chainat Hornbill (T2)	1–3	PT Prachuap (T1)	Mueang, Chainat
17:00 (UTC+7)	Douglas Rodrigues 86' (pen.)	Report; Highlight	Saranyu Intarach 35'; Apichart Denman 66'; Mehti Sarakham 79'	Stadium: Khao Plong Stadium; Attendance: 1,015; Referee: Songkran Bunmeekiart; Assistant referees: Wirot Lokham, Sumate Peasiri; Fourth official: Suwat Wongsuwan

9 February 2022	Khon Kaen United (T1)	0–3	Bangkok United (T1)	Mueang, Khon Kaen
18:00 (UTC+7)		Report; Highlight	Nattawut Suksum 9', 82'; Heberty 46'	Stadium: Khon Kaen PAO. Stadium; Attendance: 3,385; Referee: Natee Choosuwan; Assistant referees: Rawut Nakarit, Poonsawat Samransuk; Fourth official: Amnat Makklang

9 February 2022	Ratchaburi Mitr Phol (T1)	1–0	Police Tero (T1)	Mueang, Ratchaburi
18:00 (UTC+7)	Montree Promsawat 20'	Report; Highlight		Stadium: Mitr Phol Stadium; Attendance: 1,278; Referee: Wiwat Jumpaoon; Assistant referees: Rachain Srichai, Phubes Lekpha; Fourth official: Anusorn Nookaew

9 February 2022	Buriram United (T1)	4–1	Samut Prakan City (T1)	Mueang, Buriram
18:30 (UTC+7)	Jonathan Bolingi 18'; Maicon 33'; Supachai Chaided 50'; Ayub Masika 54'	Report; Highlight	Sarayut Sompim 90+3'	Stadium: Chang Arena; Attendance: 5,565; Referee: Noppadet Mangngam; Assistant referees: Tanate Chuchuen, Chaowalit Poonprasit; Fourth official: Paisan Bendem-alee

9 February 2022	Chiangrai United (T1)	3–0	Chiangmai United (T1)	Mueang, Chiangrai
19:00 (UTC+7)	Chotipat Poomkaew 32'; Siroch Chatthong 45'; Felipe Amorim 80'	Report; Highlight		Stadium: Leo Chiangrai Stadium; Attendance: 537; Referee: Sarayut Jakngoen; Assistant referees: Teerapon Sunyapluem, Tanin Reunjit; Fourth official: Tastarawut Khantavichai

=== Quarter-finals ===
The quarter-finals would be featured 8 clubs that were the winners of the second round including 7 clubs from T1 and 1 club from T3. This round had drawn on 15 February 2022. There are 12 goals that occurred in this round.

Team 1	Score	Team 2
PT Prachuap (T1)	2–1	Uthai Thani (T3)
Bangkok United (T1)	0–1 (a.e.t.)	Chonburi (T1)
Chiangrai United (T1)	4–2	BG Pathum United (T1)
Ratchaburi Mitr Phol (T1)	0–2	Buriram United (T1)

12 March 2022	PT Prachuap (T1)	2–1	Uthai Thani (T3)	Mueang, Prachuap Khiri Khan
18:00 (UTC+7)	Apichart Denman 33'; Patrick Reichelt 73'	Report; Highlight	Ricardo Santos 35'	Stadium: Sam Ao Stadium; Attendance: 491; Referee: Sivakorn Pu-udom; Assistant referees: Pattarapong Kijsathit, Rawut Nakarit; Fourth official: Noppadet Mangngam

13 March 2022	Bangkok United (T1)	0–1 (a.e.t.)	Chonburi (T1)	Khlong Luang, Pathum Thani
18:00 (UTC+7)		Report; Highlight	Yoo Byung-soo 98'	Stadium: Thammasat Stadium; Attendance: 2,279; Referee: Niwat Insa-ard; Assistant referees: Worapong Prasartsri, Tanin Reunjit; Fourth official: Anusorn Nookaew

13 March 2022	Chiangrai United (T1)	4–2	BG Pathum United (T1)	Mueang, Chiang Rai
19:00 (UTC+7)	Felipe Amorim 19'; Getterson 51', 55'; Andrés Túñez 73' (o.g.)	Report; Highlight	Ikhsan Fandi 34', 69'	Stadium: Leo Chiangrai Stadium; Attendance: 1,752; Referee: Songkran Bunmeekiart; Assistant referees: Apichit Nophuan, Vichet Getkaew; Fourth official: Teetichai Nualjan

8 May 2022	Ratchaburi Mitr Phol (T1)	0–2	Buriram United (T1)	Mueang, Ratchaburi
18:30 (UTC+7)		Report; Highlight	Jonathan Bolingi 48'; Supachok Sarachat 72'	Stadium: Mitr Phol Stadium; Attendance: 5,382; Referee: Natee Choosuwan; Assistant referees: Worapong Prasartsri, Poonsawat Samransuk; Fourth official: Anusorn Nookaew

=== Semi-finals ===
The semi-finals would be featured 4 clubs that were the winners of the quarter-finals, all are clubs from T1. This round had drawn on 5 April 2022. There are 2 goals that occurred in this round.

Team 1	Score	Team 2
Chonburi (T1)	0–1	PT Prachuap (T1)
Buriram United (T1)	1–0	Chiangrai United (T1)

25 May 2022	Chonburi (T1)	0–1	PT Prachuap (T1)	Khlong Luang, Pathum Thani
18:00 (UTC+7)		Report; Highlight	Willen 64'	Stadium: Thammasat Stadium; Attendance: 1,877; Referee: Mongkolchai Pechsri; Assistant referees: Komsan Kampan, Chaiya Sripak; Fourth official: Niwat Insa-ard

25 May 2022	Buriram United (T1)	1–0	Chiangrai United (T1)	Mueang, Chonburi
19:00 (UTC+7)	Theerathon Bunmathan 8'	Report; Highlight		Stadium: Chonburi Stadium; Attendance: 2,826; Referee: Natee Choosuwan; Assistant referees: Tanate Chuchuen, Rachain Srichai; Fourth official: Akom Charoensuk

=== Final ===
The final would be featured 2 clubs that were the winners of the semi-finals, both are clubs from T1. There are 4 goals that occurred in this round.

29 May 2022	PT Prachuap (T1)	0–4	Buriram United (T1)	Thanyaburi, Pathum Thani
18:00 (UTC+7)		Report; Highlight; Full match Ceremony	Jonathan Bolingi 35', 61'; Peeradon Chamratsamee 90'; Suphanat Mueanta 90+1'	Stadium: BG Stadium; Attendance: 7,628; Referee: Torphong Somsing; Assistant referees: Pattarapong Kijsathit, Apichit Nophuan; Fourth official: Noppadet Mangngam

== Tournament statistics ==
=== Top goalscorers ===
Rank	Player	Club	Goals
1	(Brazil) Ricardo Santos	Uthai Thani	6
2	(Democratic Republic of the Congo) Jonathan Bolingi	Buriram United	5
2	(Russia) Evgeni Kabaev	Chiangmai	5
4	(Singapore) Ikhsan Fandi	BG Pathum United	4
5	(Thailand) Thiraphat Nunsuk	ACDC	3
5	(Brazil) Getterson	Chiangrai United	3
5	(Ivory Coast) Diarra Junior Aboubacar	Kanchanaburi	3
5	(Egypt) Mohamed Samir	Krabi	3
5	(Thailand) Phuchakhen Chandaeng	Krabi	3
5	(Brazil) Mairon Natan Pereira Maciel Oliveira	Songkhla	3

=== Hat-tricks ===
Player	For	Against	Result	Date	Round
(Egypt) Mohamed Samir	Krabi (T3)	Kamphaengphet (T3)	7–0 (H)	3 November 2021	Qualification play-off round
(Russia) Evgeni Kabaev^{5}	Chiangmai (T2)	Marines Eureka (T3)	8–2 (A)	24 November 2021	Qualification play-off round

Notes: ^{5} = Player scored 5 goals; (H) = Home team; (A) = Away team

== See also ==
- 2021–22 Thai League 1
- 2021–22 Thai League 2
- 2021–22 Thai League 3
- 2021–22 Thai League 3 Northern Region
- 2021–22 Thai League 3 Northeastern Region
- 2021–22 Thai League 3 Eastern Region
- 2021–22 Thai League 3 Western Region
- 2021–22 Thai League 3 Southern Region
- 2021–22 Thai League 3 Bangkok Metropolitan Region
- 2021–22 Thai League 3 National Championship
- 2021–22 Thai FA Cup
- 2021 Thailand Champions Cup
