= 2020–21 Thai League 3 Northern Region =

Thai League 3 Northern Region
- Season: 2020–21
- Dates: 3 October 2020 – 3 January 2021
- Champions: Lamphun Warriors
- T3 National Championship: Lamphun Warriors; Phitsanulok
- Matches: 83
- Goals: 203 (2.45 per match)
- Top goalscorer: (Brazil) Natan Oliveira (12 goals; Lamphun Warriors) (Brazil) Rafinha (12 goals; Wat Bot City)
- Biggest home win: 5 goals difference Wat Bot City 6–1 Northern Tak United (18 November 2020)
- Biggest away win: 4 goals difference Chiangrai City 0–4 Lamphun Warriors (25 October 2020)
- Highest scoring: 7 goals Wat Bot City 6–1 Northern Tak United (18 November 2020)
- Longest winning run: 6 matches Lamphun Warriors
- Longest unbeaten run: 10 matches Phitsanulok
- Longest winless run: 8 matches Chiangrai City; Kamphaengphet; Northern Tak United
- Longest losing run: 6 matches Northern Tak United

The 2020–21 Thai League 3 Northern region is a region in the regional stage of the 2020–21 Thai League 3. Due to the COVID-19 pandemic, the season must be postponed to start in late 2020 and end in early 2021. In addition, the Thai League 4 had combined with the Thai League 3 and compete as Thai League 3 since this season and there is no relegation in this season. A total of 11 teams located in Northern, Upper western, and Upper central of Thailand will compete in the league of the Northern region.

In late December 2020, COVID-19 had spread again in Thailand, the FA Thailand must abruptly end the regional stage of the Thai League 3. The second-placed and the third-placed of the Northern region have the similar points, so they must play-off to find a team to qualified to the national championship stage.

== Teams ==
=== Number of teams by province ===
Position	Province	Number	Teams
1	Chiang Rai	2	Chiangrai City and Chiangrai Lanna
1	Phitsanulok	2	Phitsanulok and Wat Bot City
2	Chiang Mai	1	Maejo United
2	Kamphaeng Phet	1	Kamphaengphet
2	Lamphun	1	Lamphun Warriors
2	Nakhon Sawan	1	See Khwae City
2	Nan	1	Nan
2	Tak	1	Northern Tak United
2	Uttaradit	1	Uttaradit

=== Stadiums and locations ===
Locations of the 2020–21 Thai League 3 Northern region teams

Team	Location	Stadium	Coordinates
Chiangrai City	Chiangrai (Mueang)	Chiangrai Provincial Stadium	19°54′48″N 99°51′21″E
Chiangrai Lanna	Chiangrai (Mueang)	Chiangrai Provincial Stadium	19°54′48″N 99°51′21″E
Kamphaengphet	Kamphaengphet (Mueang)	Cha Kung Rao Stadium	16°28′40″N 99°31′17″E
Lamphun Warriors	Lamphun (Mueang)	Lamphun Provincial Stadium	18°34′04″N 99°00′24″E
Maejo United	Chiangmai (San Sai)	Maejo University Stadium	18°53′54″N 99°00′48″E
Nan	Nan (Mueang)	Nan PAO. Stadium	18°47′33″N 100°46′32″E
Northern Tak United	Tak (Mueang)	Tak PAO. Stadium	16°52′31″N 99°08′22″E
Phitsanulok	Phitsanulok (Mueang)	Phitsanulok PAO. Stadium	16°50′47″N 100°15′51″E
See Khwae City	Nakhon Sawan (Mueang)	Nakhon Sawan Sport School Stadium	15°44′33″N 100°07′56″E
Uttaradit	Uttaradit (Mueang)	Uttaradit Provincial Stadium	17°36′34″N 100°06′39″E
Wat Bot City	Phitsanulok (Mueang)	Phitsanulok PAO. Stadium	16°50′47″N 100°15′51″E

=== Foreign players ===
A T3 team could register 3 foreign players from foreign players all around the world. A team can use 3 foreign players on the field in each game.

Note :
(substituted off) : players who released during second leg transfer window;
(substituted in) : players who registered during second leg transfer window.

AFC member countries players.
CAF member countries players.
CONCACAF member countries players.
CONMEBOL member countries players.
OFC member countries players.
UEFA member countries players.
No foreign player registered.

Club	Leg	Player 1	Player 2	Player 3
Chiangrai City	1st
Chiangrai City	2nd
Chiangrai Lanna	1st
Chiangrai Lanna	2nd	(Brazil) Leonardo Fontes dos Santos (substituted in)	(Egypt) Osama Mohsin Fathy Abdelaziz (substituted in)
Kamphaengphet	1st		(Azerbaijan) Mommod Bokir Oglu Mammad (substituted off)
Kamphaengphet	2nd	(Sierra Leone) Alpha Sama (substituted in)	(Japan) Hidaka Kohei (substituted in)
Lamphun Warriors	1st	(Brazil) Josimar Tiago da Silva (substituted off)	(Brazil) Natan Oliveira	(Brazil) André Luís Leite
Lamphun Warriors	2nd	(Brazil) João Paulo (substituted in)	(Brazil) Natan Oliveira	(Brazil) André Luís Leite
Maejo United	1st	(Brazil) Caio Santos Vicente	(Guinea) Maiga Diabate Ibrahima Saydou
Maejo United	2nd	(Brazil) Caio Santos Vicente	(Guinea) Maiga Diabate Ibrahima Saydou
Nan	1st
Nan	2nd
Northern Tak United	1st	(Cameroon) Tewidikum Tah Nivan	(Ivory Coast) Abdel Razak Diomande	(Pakistan) Muhammad Obaid Khurshid
Northern Tak United	2nd	(Cameroon) Tewidikum Tah Nivan	(Ivory Coast) Abdel Razak Diomande	(Pakistan) Muhammad Obaid Khurshid
Phitsanulok	1st	(Japan) Taku Ito (substituted off)	(Japan) Koki Narita	(Iran) Saeid Chahjouei
Phitsanulok	2nd	(Iran) Amirali Chegini (substituted in)	(Japan) Koki Narita	(Iran) Saeid Chahjouei
See Khwae City	1st	(Nigeria) Omotosho Shola Jimmy (substituted off)	(Nigeria) Eke Mbah	(Togo) Ekue Andre Houma
See Khwae City	2nd		(Nigeria) Eke Mbah	(Togo) Ekue Andre Houma
Uttaradit	1st		(Ivory Coast) Serge William Viera M'Boa
Uttaradit	2nd	(Ivory Coast) Aboubacar Junior Sanogo (substituted in)	(Ivory Coast) Serge William Viera M'Boa
Wat Bot City	1st		(Brazil) Rafinha	(Ivory Coast) Diarrassouba Hamed de Silci
Wat Bot City	2nd	(Japan) Takeshi Miki (substituted in)	(Brazil) Rafinha	(Ivory Coast) Diarrassouba Hamed de Silci

== League table ==
=== Standings ===
Pos	Team	Pld	W	D	L	GF	GA	GD	Pts	Qualification or relegation
1	Lamphun Warriors (Q)	15	13	0	2	31	6	+25	39	Qualification to the National Championship stage
2	Maejo United	15	10	3	2	23	8	+15	33	Qualification to the National Championship stage play-offs
3	Phitsanulok (O, Q)	14	10	2	2	25	8	+17	32	Qualification to the National Championship stage play-offs
4	Uttaradit	15	8	1	6	22	18	+4	25	
5	Wat Bot City	16	8	0	8	25	17	+8	24	
6	See Khwae City	16	6	3	7	19	25	−6	21	
7	Nan	15	5	4	6	16	19	−3	19	
8	Chiangrai City	14	3	4	7	13	21	−8	13	
9	Kamphaengphet	15	3	4	8	11	22	−11	13	
10	Northern Tak United	16	3	1	12	11	33	−22	10	
11	Chiangrai Lanna	15	2	2	11	7	26	−19	8	

Source: Thai League
Rules for classification: 1) Points; 2) Head-to-head points; 3) Head-to-head goal difference; 4) Head-to-head goal scored; 5) Overall goal difference; 6) Overall goal scored; 7) Fair play points; 8) Play-off without extra time).
(O) Play-off winners; (Q) Qualified for the phase indicated

=== Positions by round ===
Team ╲ Round	1	2	3	4	5	6	7	8	9	10	11	12	13	14	15	16	17
Lamphun Warriors	5	3	1	1	1	1	1	1	1	1	1	1	1	1	1	1	1
Maejo United	1	1	3	2	2	2	2	2	2	2	2	3	3	2	2	2	2
Phitsanulok	10	4	5	3	5	4	3	3	3	3	3	2	2	3	3	3	3
Uttaradit	3	7	2	5	6	8	6	5	4	5	4	5	4	4	4	5	4
Wat Bot City	6	9	7	8	9	7	5	8	6	6	7	6	6	6	5	4	5
See Khwae City	2	2	6	6	3	3	4	4	5	4	5	4	5	5	6	6	6
Nan	11	11	11	10	8	6	8	7	8	8	6	7	7	7	7	7	7
Chiangrai City	9	8	9	9	10	10	10	10	11	10	10	11	11	10	10	9	8
Kamphaengphet	4	5	8	7	4	5	7	6	7	7	8	8	8	8	8	8	9
Northern Tak United	8	6	4	4	7	9	9	9	9	9	9	10	9	9	9	10	10
Chiangrai Lanna	7	10	10	11	11	11	11	11	10	11	11	9	10	11	11	11	11

Source: Thai League
= Qualification to the National Championship stage; = Qualification to the National Championship stage play-offs

=== Results by round ===
Team ╲ Round	1	2	3	4	5	6	7	8	9	10	11	12	13	14	15	16	17
Lamphun Warriors	W	W	W	W	W	W	L	N	W	W	W	W	L	W	W	W	N
Maejo United	W	W	L	W	W	N	W	D	D	W	D	L	W	W	W	N	W
Phitsanulok	L	W	W	N	L	W	W	W	D	W	D	W	W	N	W	W	N
Uttaradit	W	L	W	L	L	L	W	W	W	N	W	L	W	L	W	D	N
Wat Bot City	N	L	W	L	L	W	W	L	W	L	L	W	W	L	W	W	L
See Khwae City	W	W	L	L	W	W	L	D	N	W	D	W	L	L	L	L	D
Nan	L	L	N	W	W	D	D	W	L	L	W	L	N	W	L	D	D
Chiangrai City	L	N	L	W	L	L	D	L	L	D	D	N	L	W	W	D	N
Kamphaengphet	W	L	L	D	W	D	N	W	L	L	L	L	L	D	L	D	N
Northern Tak United	L	W	W	L	L	L	L	L	L	D	N	L	W	L	L	L	L
Chiangrai Lanna	L	L	L	D	N	L	L	L	W	L	L	W	L	D	N	L	L

Source: Thai League
N = No match; W = Won; D = Drawn; L = Lost

=== Results ===
Home \ Away	CRC	CRL	KPP	LPW	MJU	NAN	NTU	PLK	SKC	UTD	WBC
Chiangrai City	—	0–1	—	0–4	—	0–0	—	—	5–1	1–3	2–1
Chiangrai Lanna	—	—	0–0	0–3	1–4	—	1–0	1–3	1–2	0–1	0–1
Kamphaengphet	1–0	1–1	—	—	1–2	1–1	2–0	2–1	1–2	—	0–2
Lamphun Warriors	—	—	5–1	—	1–2	3–1	4–0	—	1–0	1–0	2–0
Maejo United	0–0	2–0	—	0–1	—	3–1	2–0	0–0	—	1–0	0–1
Nan	0–0	2–0	0–0	—	—	—	3–0	0–2	0–2	0–1	2–1
Northern Tak United	1–1	1–0	—	0–1	1–3	1–2	—	0–2	3–1	—	—
Phitsanulok	2–1	1–0	4–0	0–1	—	3–1	3–0	—	—	1–0	2–1
See Khwae City	2–1	—	2–1	0–2	0–0	—	0–2	1–1	—	1–1	1–3
Uttaradit	5–1	—	1–0	0–2	1–3	2–3	2–1	—	3–2	—	—
Wat Bot City	0–1	5–1	1–0	2–0	0–1	—	6–1	—	0–2	1–2	—

Source: Thai League
Legend: Blue = home team win; Yellow = draw; Red = away team win.
For upcoming matches, an "a" indicates there is an article about the rivalry between the two participants.

== Season statistics ==
=== Top scorers ===
As of 3 January 2021.

Rank	Player	Club	Goals
1	(Brazil) Natan Oliveira	Lamphun Warriors	12
1	(Brazil) Rafinha	Wat Bot City	12
3	(Thailand) Chatchai Narkwijit	Phitsanulok	9
4	(Thailand) Nattapong Meemanee	Nan	8
4	(Togo) Ekue Andre Houma	See Khwae City	8
6	(Thailand) Suriphat Thaensopha	Chiangrai City	7
6	(Thailand) Wichaya Pornprasart	Maejo United	7
8	(Japan) Koki Narita	Phitsanulok	6

=== Hat-tricks ===
Player	For	Against	Result	Date
(Brazil) Natan Oliveira	Lamphun Warriors	Chiangrai City	4–0 (A)	25 October 2020
(Brazil) Rafinha	Wat Bot City	Northern Tak United	6–1 (H)	18 November 2020
(Thailand) Chatchai Narkwijit	Phitsanulok	Kamphaengphet	4–0 (H)	23 December 2020
(Brazil) Rafinha	Wat Bot City	Chiangrai Lanna	5–1 (H)	27 December 2020
(Thailand) Suriphat Thaensopha	Chiangrai City	See Khwae City	5–1 (H)	27 December 2020

Notes: (H) = Home team; (A) = Away team

=== Clean sheets ===
As of 3 January 2021.

Rank	Player	Club	Clean sheets
1	(Thailand) Adisak Duangsri	Lamphun Warriors	10
2	(Thailand) Watchara Panmoon	Maejo United	7
3	(Thailand) Kritsada Nonchai	Phitsanulok	6
4	(Thailand) Jiraphat Kamon	Nan	4
5	(Thailand) Sutthimat Tibbanhan	Chiangrai City	3
5	(Thailand) Jirasak Kunnapan	Kamphaengphet	3
5	(Thailand) Sarayut Khongcharoen	Wat Bot City	3

== See also ==
- 2020–21 Thai League 1
- 2020–21 Thai League 2
- 2020–21 Thai League 3
- 2020–21 Thai League 3 Northeastern Region
- 2020–21 Thai League 3 Eastern Region
- 2020–21 Thai League 3 Western Region
- 2020–21 Thai League 3 Southern Region
- 2020–21 Thai League 3 Bangkok Metropolitan Region
- 2020–21 Thai League 3 National Championship
- 2020–21 Thai FA Cup
- 2020 Thailand Champions Cup
