= 2021–22 Thai League 3 Northern Region =

Thai League 3 Northern Region
- Season: 2021–22
- Dates: 4 September 2021 – 26 February 2022
- Champions: Uthai Thani
- Relegated: Northern Tak United
- T3 National Championship: Uthai Thani; Phitsanulok
- Matches: 132
- Goals: 294 (2.23 per match)
- Top goalscorer: (Brazil) Ricardo Santos (19 goals; Uthai Thani)
- Best goalkeeper: (Thailand) Farus Patee (9 clean sheets; Chiangrai City) (Thailand) Watchara Panmoon (9 clean sheets; Maejo United)
- Biggest home win: 5 goals difference Uthai Thani 5–0 Kamphaengphet (23 October 2021)
- Biggest away win: 8 goals difference Wat Bot City 0–8 Uthai Thani (16 October 2021)
- Highest scoring: 8 goals Wat Bot City 0–8 Uthai Thani (16 October 2021)
- Longest winning run: 8 matches Uthai Thani
- Longest unbeaten run: 10 matches Uthai Thani
- Longest winless run: 15 matches Northern Tak United
- Longest losing run: 5 matches Nan
- Highest attendance: 800; Phitsanulok 0–1 Wat Bot City (6 November 2021)
- Lowest attendance: 0
- Total attendance: 14,401
- Average attendance: 225

The 2021–22 Thai League 3 Northern region is a region in the regional stage of the 2021–22 Thai League 3. The tournament was sponsored by Blue Dragon Lottery Online, and known as the Blue Dragon League for sponsorship purposes. A total of 12 teams located in Northern, Upper western, and Upper central of Thailand will compete in the league of the Northern region.

== Teams ==
=== Number of teams by province ===
Position	Province	Number	Teams
1	Chiang Rai	2	Chiangrai City and Chiangrai Lanna
1	Phitsanulok	2	Phitsanulok and Wat Bot City
1	Tak	2	Nakhon Mae Sot United and Northern Tak United
2	Chiang Mai	1	Maejo United
2	Kamphaeng Phet	1	Kamphaengphet
2	Nan	1	Nan
2	Phichit	1	See Khwae City
2	Uthai Thani	1	Uthai Thani
2	Uttaradit	1	Uttaradit

=== Stadiums and locations ===
Locations of the 2021–22 Thai League 3 Northern region teams

Team	Location	Stadium	Coordinates
Chiangrai City	Chiangrai (Mueang)	Leo Chiangrai Stadium	19°57′25″N 99°52′29″E
Chiangrai Lanna	Chiangrai (Mueang)	Chiangrai Provincial Stadium	19°54′48″N 99°51′21″E
Kamphaengphet	Kamphaengphet (Khanu Woralaksaburi)	Stadium of Khanu Wittaya School	16°03′36″N 99°51′32″E
Maejo United	Chiangmai (San Sai)	Maejo University Stadium	18°53′54″N 99°00′48″E
Maejo United	Lamphun (Mueang)	Lamphun Provincial Stadium (temporary)	18°34′04″N 99°00′24″E
Nakhon Mae Sot United	Tak (Mueang)	Tak PAO. Stadium	16°52′31″N 99°08′22″E
Nakhon Mae Sot United	Phitsanulok (Wat Bot)	H2H Sport Stadium (temporary)	16°58′52″N 100°19′35″E
Nan	Nan (Mueang)	Nan PAO. Stadium	18°47′33″N 100°46′32″E
Nan	Phrae (Mueang)	Thung Hong Stadium (temporary)	18°10′31″N 100°10′16″E
Northern Tak United	Tak (Mueang)	Tak PAO. Stadium	16°52′31″N 99°08′22″E
Northern Tak United	Phitsanulok (Mueang)	Phitsanulok PAO. Stadium (temporary)	16°50′47″N 100°15′51″E
Phitsanulok	Phitsanulok (Mueang)	Phitsanulok PAO. Stadium	16°50′47″N 100°15′51″E
See Khwae City	Phichit (Mueang)	Phichit Provincial Stadium	16°26′35″N 100°19′26″E
See Khwae City	Kamphaengphet (Khanu Woralaksaburi)	Stadium of Khanu Wittaya School (temporary)	16°03′36″N 99°51′32″E
Uthai Thani	Uthai Thani (Mueang)	Uthai Thani Provincial Stadium	15°23′40″N 100°01′01″E
Uttaradit	Uttaradit (Mueang)	Uttaradit Provincial Stadium	17°36′34″N 100°06′39″E
Uttaradit	Phrae (Mueang)	Thung Hong Stadium (temporary)	18°10′31″N 100°10′16″E
Wat Bot City	Phitsanulok (Wat Bot)	H2H Sport Stadium	16°58′52″N 100°19′35″E

=== Foreign players ===
A T3 team could register 3 foreign players from foreign players all around the world. A team can use 3 foreign players on the field in each game.

Note :
(substituted off) : players who released during second leg transfer window;
(substituted on) : players who registered during second leg transfer window.

AFC member countries players.
CAF member countries players.
CONCACAF member countries players.
CONMEBOL member countries players.
OFC member countries players.
UEFA member countries players.
No foreign player registered.

Club	Leg	Player 1	Player 2	Player 3
Chiangrai City	1st	(Japan) Ryuji Hirota
Chiangrai City	2nd	(Japan) Ryuji Hirota
Chiangrai Lanna	1st	(Egypt) Mohamed Abdalla Abdelaal (substituted off)	(Japan) Takuya Ogata (substituted off)	(Japan) Kenta Kishi
Chiangrai Lanna	2nd	(Japan) Jumpei Nishiwaki (substituted on)	(Japan) Taiga Watanabe (substituted on)	(Japan) Kenta Kishi
Kamphaengphet	1st	(Brazil) Rômullo da Silva Cardoso (substituted off)	(Azerbaijan) Mommod Bokir Oglu Mammad (substituted off)	(Brazil) Lucas Cunha da Costa
Kamphaengphet	2nd	(Azerbaijan) Mammad Guliyev (substituted on)	(Japan) Aoi Isami (substituted on)	(Brazil) Lucas Cunha da Costa
Maejo United	1st	(Japan) Aoi Isami (substituted off)	(Brazil) Caio Santos Vicente	(Guinea) Maiga Diabate Ibrahima Saydou
Maejo United	2nd	(South Korea) Lee Gi-been (substituted on)	(Brazil) Caio Santos Vicente	(Guinea) Maiga Diabate Ibrahima Saydou
Nakhon Mae Sot United	1st		(Cameroon) Tewidikum Tah Nivan
Nakhon Mae Sot United	2nd	(Togo) Ekue Andre Houma (substituted on)	(Cameroon) Tewidikum Tah Nivan
Nan	1st
Nan	2nd
Northern Tak United	1st	(Brazil) Tiago Severino da Silva (substituted off)	(Guinea) Sylla Sekou Nana (substituted off)	(Iran) Afrough Ali Shirmohammad
Northern Tak United	2nd	(Ivory Coast) Akpa Agbandji Augustin (substituted on)	(Ghana) Ozor Enoch (substituted on)	(Iran) Afrough Ali Shirmohammad
Phitsanulok	1st	(Brazil) Vinícius Silva Freitas (substituted off)	(Brazil) Gilberto Macena	(Brazil) André Luís
Phitsanulok	2nd	(Brazil) João Paulo (substituted on)	(Brazil) Gilberto Macena	(Brazil) André Luís
See Khwae City	1st	(Brazil) Gustavo (substituted off)	(Uruguay) Diego Silva	(Nigeria) Julius Chukwuma Ononiwu
See Khwae City	2nd	(Japan) Tomoya Hayashi (substituted on)	(Uruguay) Diego Silva	(Nigeria) Julius Chukwuma Ononiwu
Uthai Thani	1st	(Brazil) Ricardo Santos	(Brazil) Júnior Lopes	(Nigeria) Chigozie Mbah
Uthai Thani	2nd	(Brazil) Ricardo Santos	(Brazil) Júnior Lopes	(Nigeria) Chigozie Mbah
Uttaradit	1st		(Togo) Ekue Andre Houma (substituted off)	(Ivory Coast) Serge William Viera M'Boa
Uttaradit	2nd	(Egypt) Waleed Adel (substituted on)	(Namibia) Sadney Urikhob (substituted on)	(Ivory Coast) Serge William Viera M'Boa
Wat Bot City	1st	(Japan) Takeshi Miki (substituted off)	(Ivory Coast) Diarrassouba Hamed de Silci	(Republic of the Congo) Burnel Okana-Stazi
Wat Bot City	2nd	(Brazil) Leonardo Vieira Lima (substituted on)	(Ivory Coast) Diarrassouba Hamed de Silci	(Republic of the Congo) Burnel Okana-Stazi

== League table ==
=== Standings ===
Pos	Team	Pld	W	D	L	GF	GA	GD	Pts	Qualification or relegation
1	Uthai Thani (C, Q)	22	18	2	2	63	11	+52	56	Qualification to the National Championship stage
2	Phitsanulok (Q)	22	11	8	3	28	15	+13	41	Qualification to the National Championship stage
3	Maejo United	22	11	5	6	23	21	+2	38	
4	Wat Bot City	22	8	11	3	26	26	0	35 (Note: Wat Bot City ahead on head-to-head points record; Wat Bot City 4 pts, See Khwae City 1 pt.)	
5	See Khwae City	22	10	5	7	27	23	+4	35	
6	Chiangrai City	22	8	10	4	19	14	+5	34	
7	Uttaradit	22	7	7	8	27	22	+5	28	
8	Nakhon Mae Sot United	22	5	5	12	13	22	−9	20	
9	Kamphaengphet	22	4	7	11	18	35	−17	19	
10	Chiangrai Lanna	22	4	6	12	16	38	−22	18	
11	Nan	22	4	5	13	18	33	−15	17	
12	Northern Tak United (R)	22	3	7	12	16	34	−18	16	Relegation to the Thailand Amateur League

Source: Thai League
Rules for classification: 1) Points; 2) Head-to-head points; 3) Head-to-head goal difference; 4) Head-to-head goal scored; 5) Overall goal difference; 6) Overall goal scored; 7) Fair play points; 8) Play-off without extra time).
(C) Champions; (Q) Qualified for the phase indicated; (R) Relegated

=== Positions by round ===
Team ╲ Round	1	2	3	4	5	6	7	8	9	10	11	12	13	14	15	16	17	18	19	20	21	22
Uthai Thani	2	1	1	1	1	1	1	1	1	1	1	1	1	1	1	1	1	1	1	1	1	1
Phitsanulok	1	2	2	2	3	2	2	2	2	2	2	2	3	3	2	2	2	2	2	3	2	2
Maejo United	8	6	7	6	5	5	5	6	5	5	5	4	5	5	4	3	3	3	3	2	3	3
Wat Bot City	3	4	3	3	2	4	3	3	3	3	3	3	2	2	3	4	4	4	4	4	5	4
See Khwae City	5	5	6	8	9	8	6	5	6	6	6	7	7	7	7	7	6	6	6	6	4	5
Chiangrai City	6	3	4	4	4	3	4	4	4	4	4	5	4	4	5	5	5	5	5	5	6	6
Uttaradit	12	7	5	5	6	7	8	8	7	7	7	6	6	6	6	6	7	7	7	7	7	7
Nakhon Mae Sot United	10	12	8	9	8	9	10	11	11	11	11	11	11	9	10	10	11	10	9	9	10	8
Kamphaengphet	9	11	12	10	10	10	11	9	9	8	8	8	8	11	8	8	10	8	10	10	8	9
Chiangrai Lanna	4	8	9	7	7	6	7	7	8	9	9	9	9	8	9	9	8	9	8	8	9	10
Nan	7	9	10	11	12	11	9	10	10	10	10	10	10	10	11	11	9	11	11	11	11	11
Northern Tak United	11	10	11	12	11	12	12	12	12	12	12	12	12	12	12	12	12	12	12	12	12	12

Source: Thai League
= Qualification to the National Championship stage; = Relegation to the Thailand Amateur League

=== Results by round ===
Team ╲ Round	1	2	3	4	5	6	7	8	9	10	11	12	13	14	15	16	17	18	19	20	21	22
Uthai Thani	W	W	W	W	W	W	W	W	D	W	L	W	W	W	W	W	W	W	D	W	L	W
Phitsanulok	W	W	W	W	D	W	D	W	L	D	W	L	D	D	W	W	D	D	D	L	W	W
Maejo United	L	W	L	W	W	D	W	L	W	D	D	W	L	W	W	W	W	L	L	W	D	D
Wat Bot City	W	D	W	W	W	L	D	W	W	L	D	W	W	D	D	L	D	D	D	D	D	D
See Khwae City	W	D	L	L	L	W	W	W	L	D	D	L	D	L	W	W	W	W	L	W	W	D
Chiangrai City	D	W	W	L	W	W	L	W	D	D	D	D	W	D	L	W	L	D	D	W	D	D
Uttaradit	L	W	W	L	L	D	D	L	W	L	W	W	W	D	D	L	D	D	W	D	L	L
Nakhon Mae Sot United	L	L	W	L	D	L	L	L	L	W	D	L	D	W	L	L	L	D	W	D	L	W
Kamphaengphet	L	L	L	W	D	L	L	W	D	W	D	L	L	L	D	L	L	W	L	D	D	D
Chiangrai Lanna	W	L	L	W	L	W	L	L	D	D	D	L	L	D	L	L	D	D	W	L	L	L
Nan	D	L	L	L	L	L	W	L	W	L	D	W	L	D	L	L	D	L	L	L	W	D
Northern Tak United	L	L	L	L	D	L	D	L	L	D	L	D	D	L	D	W	D	L	W	L	W	L

Source: Thai League
W = Won; D = Drawn; L = Lost

=== Results ===
Home \ Away	CRC	CRL	KPP	MJU	NMS	NAN	NTK	PLK	SKC	UTT	UTD	WBC
Chiangrai City	—	1–0	1–0	0–1	1–0	0–0	3–2	1–2	1–0	0–0	1–1	1–1
Chiangrai Lanna	1–1	—	2–1	0–1	1–0	0–0	2–0	1–1	1–2	0–6	1–1	1–6
Kamphaengphet	0–2	1–1	—	0–0	0–1	4–2	1–1	1–2	0–1	1–4	0–2	1–1
Maejo United	1–0	3–1	1–1	—	1–2	1–0	1–0	0–0	0–2	0–2	1–1	0–0
Nakhon Mae Sot United	0–1	2–1	0–1	0–1	—	1–1	1–1	1–2	0–3	0–1	0–0	0–0
Nan	1–1	3–1	0–1	2–3	1–0	—	2–0	1–0	2–3	0–1	1–3	0–0
Northern Tak United	0–0	2–0	1–1	0–1	0–1	2–0	—	0–2	1–1	0–5	1–0	1–1
Phitsanulok	1–1	3–0	4–0	0–2	1–1	1–0	1–0	—	1–0	2–1	1–1	0–1
See Khwae City	1–0	1–1	0–0	3–0	2–1	1–0	3–1	1–1	—	1–4	0–1	1–1
Uthai Thani	0–0	2–0	5–0	3–1	2–0	3–1	3–1	2–3	3–0	—	2–0	5–1
Uttaradit	1–2	0–1	2–0	2–3	0–2	5–1	4–1	0–0	2–1	0–1	—	0–1
Wat Bot City	1–1	1–0	2–4	2–1	1–0	2–0	1–1	0–0	2–0	0–8	1–1	—

Source: Thai League
Legend: Blue = home team win; Yellow = draw; Red = away team win.
For upcoming matches, an "a" indicates there is an article about the rivalry between the two participants.

== Season statistics ==
=== Top scorers ===
As of 26 February 2022.

Rank	Player	Club	Goals
1	(Brazil) Ricardo Santos	Uthai Thani	19
2	(Thailand) Chatchai Narkwijit	Uttaradit	14
3	(Thailand) Phattharaphon Jansuwan	Uthai Thani	11
4	(Republic of the Congo) Burnel Okana-Stazi	Wat Bot City	10
5	(Nigeria) Chigozie Mbah	Uthai Thani	9
6	(Brazil) Gilberto Macena	Phitsanulok	8

=== Hat-tricks ===
Player	For	Against	Result	Date
(Republic of the Congo) Burnel Okana-Stazi	Wat Bot City	Chiangrai Lanna	6–1 (A)	26 September 2021
(Brazil) Ricardo Santos	Uthai Thani	Wat Bot City	8–0 (A)	16 October 2021
(Brazil) Ricardo Santos	Uthai Thani	Kamphaengphet	5–0 (H)	23 October 2021
(Thailand) Punyaphat Autha	Kamphaengphet	Nan	4–2 (H)	31 October 2021
(Thailand) Kawin Nuanthat	Kamphaengphet	Wat Bot City	4–2 (A)	13 November 2021
(Thailand) Chatchai Narkwijit	Uttaradit	Northern Tak United	4–1 (H)	20 November 2021
(Brazil) Ricardo Santos	Uthai Thani	Chiangrai Lanna	6–0 (A)	16 January 2022
(Brazil) André Luís	Phitsanulok	Kamphaengphet	4–0 (H)	23 January 2022
(Uruguay) Diego Silva	See Khwae City	Northern Tak United	3–1 (H)	12 February 2022

Notes: (H) = Home team; (A) = Away team

=== Clean sheets ===
As of 26 February 2022.

Rank	Player	Club	Clean sheets
1	(Thailand) Farus Patee	Chiangrai City	9
1	(Thailand) Watchara Panmoon	Maejo United	9
3	(Thailand) Weerapong Lapkhaw	Wat Bot City	8
4	(Thailand) Worawut Sukhuna	Uthai Thani	7
5	(Thailand) Jiraphat Kamon	Nan	5
5	(Thailand) Anirut Naiyana	See Khwae City (2), Phitsanulok (3)	5
5	(Thailand) Techonant Viriyawut	Uttaradit	5

== Attendances ==
=== Overall statistical table ===
Pos	Team	Total	High	Low	Average	Change
1	Phitsanulok	4,476	800	218	407	n/a
2	Uthai Thani	3,277	725	151	298	n/a
3	Uttaradit	1,709	290	0	285	n/a
4	Wat Bot City	1,886	370	0	189	n/a
5	Maejo United	896	180	0	179	n/a
6	Kamphaengphet	1,228	321	0	154	n/a
7	Northern Tak United	401	254	0	134	n/a
8	Nan	478	162	0	120	n/a
9	See Khwae City	50	50	0	50	n/a
10	Chiangrai City	0	0	0	0	n/a
11	Chiangrai Lanna	0	0	0	0	n/a
12	Nakhon Mae Sot United	0	0	0	0	n/a
	League total	14,401	800	0	225	n/a

Updated to games played on 26 February 2022
Source: Thai League 3

=== Attendances by home match played ===
Team \ Match played	1	2	3	4	5	6	7	8	9	10	11	Total
Chiangrai City	0	0	0	0	0	0	0	0	0	0	0	0
Chiangrai Lanna	0	0	0	0	0	0	0	0	0	0	0	0
Kamphaengphet	50	0	210	250	92	59	100	80	321	0	66	1,228
Maejo United	0	0	180	0	163	120	133	0	0	120	180	896
Nakhon Mae Sot United	0	0	0	0	0	0	0	0	0	0	0	0
Nan	0	0	0	0	0	0	162	70	75	114	57	478
Northern Tak United	254	0	0	0	97	50	0	0	0	0	0	401
Phitsanulok	288	290	218	450	305	800	714	250	273	400	488	4,476
See Khwae City	0	50	0	0	0	0	0	0	0	0	0	50
Uthai Thani	159	151	182	725	317	192	350	204	200	204	593	3,277
Uttaradit	0	0	0	0	210	274	270	280	290	260	125	1,709
Wat Bot City	179	200	250	210	0	145	124	174	69	370	165	1,886

Source: Thai League

== See also ==
- 2021–22 Thai League 1
- 2021–22 Thai League 2
- 2021–22 Thai League 3
- 2021–22 Thai League 3 Northeastern Region
- 2021–22 Thai League 3 Eastern Region
- 2021–22 Thai League 3 Western Region
- 2021–22 Thai League 3 Southern Region
- 2021–22 Thai League 3 Bangkok Metropolitan Region
- 2021–22 Thai League 3 National Championship
- 2021–22 Thai FA Cup
- 2021–22 Thai League Cup
- 2021 Thailand Champions Cup
