= 2022–23 Thai League 3 Northern Region =

Thai League 3 Northern Region
- Season: 2022–23
- Dates: 10 September 2022 – 18 March 2023
- Champions: Phitsanulok
- Relegated: Chiangrai Lanna
- T3 National Championship: Phitsanulok; Uttaradit Saksiam
- Matches: 132
- Goals: 348 (2.64 per match)
- Top goalscorer: (Thailand) Saran Sridet (16 goals; Rongseemaechaithanachotiwat Phayao)
- Best goalkeeper: (Thailand) Weerapong Lapkhaw (9 clean sheets; Uttaradit Saksiam)
- Biggest home win: 9 goals difference Phitsanulok 9–0 Kongkrailas United (2 October 2022)
- Biggest away win: 3 goals difference Nakhon Mae Sot United 0–3 Chiangrai Lanna (16 October 2022); Chiangrai Lanna 0–3 Phitsanulok (7 January 2023); Kongkrailas United 0–3 Phitsanulok (18 January 2023); Chiangrai Lanna 0–3 Nakhon Mae Sot United (5 February 2023); Kongkrailas United 0–3 Uttaradit Saksiam (5 February 2023); Kamphaengphet 0–3 Maejo United (12 March 2023)
- Highest scoring: 10 goals Phitsanulok 7–3 Chiangrai Lanna (18 September 2022)
- Longest winning run: 10 matches Phitsanulok
- Longest unbeaten run: 22 matches Phitsanulok
- Longest winless run: 14 matches Chiangrai Lanna
- Longest losing run: 10 matches Chiangrai Lanna
- Highest attendance: 2,325; Phitsanulok 3–1 Uttaradit Saksiam (29 October 2022)
- Lowest attendance: 1 Phitsanulok 2–0 Nakhon Mae Sot United (19 November 2022); Rongseemaechaithanachotiwat Phayao 1–1 Wat Bot City (28 January 2023)
- Total attendance: 39,098
- Average attendance: 324

The 2022–23 Thai League 3 Northern region is a region in the regional stage of the 2022–23 Thai League 3. The tournament was sponsored by Kongsalak Plus, and known as the Kongsalak Plus League for sponsorship purposes. A total of 12 teams located in Northern, Upper western, and Upper central of Thailand will compete in the league of the Northern region.

== Teams ==
=== Number of teams by province ===
Position	Province	Number	Teams
1	Chiang Rai	2	Chiangrai City and Chiangrai Lanna
1	Phitsanulok	2	Phitsanulok and Wat Bot City
3	Chiang Mai	1	Maejo United
3	Kamphaeng Phet	1	Kamphaengphet
3	Nakhon Sawan	1	See Khwae City
3	Nan	1	Nan
3	Phayao	1	Rongseemaechaithanachotiwat Phayao
3	Sukhothai	1	Kongkrailas United
3	Tak	1	Nakhon Mae Sot United
3	Uttaradit	1	Uttaradit Saksiam

=== Stadiums and locations ===
Locations of the 2022–23 Thai League 3 Northern region teams

Team	Location	Stadium	Coordinates
Chiangrai City	Chiangrai (Mueang)	Leo Chiangrai Stadium	19°57′25″N 99°52′29″E
Chiangrai Lanna	Chiangrai (Mueang)	Chiangrai Provincial Stadium	19°54′48″N 99°51′21″E
Kamphaengphet	Kamphaengphet (Mueang)	Cha Kung Rao Stadium	16°28′40″N 99°31′17″E
Kongkrailas United	Sukhothai (Mueang)	Thalay Luang Stadium	17°03′43″N 99°47′39″E
Maejo United	Chiangmai (San Sai)	Maejo University Stadium	18°53′54″N 99°00′48″E
Nakhon Mae Sot United	Tak (Mae Sot)	Five Border Districts Stadium	16°44′07″N 98°33′52″E
Nan	Nan (Mueang)	Nan PAO. Stadium	18°47′33″N 100°46′32″E
Phitsanulok	Phitsanulok (Mueang)	Phitsanulok PAO. Stadium	16°50′47″N 100°15′51″E
Rongseemaechaithanachotiwat Phayao	Phayao (Mueang)	Phayao Provincial Stadium	19°12′10″N 99°53′30″E
See Khwae City	Nakhon Sawan (Mueang)	Nakhon Sawan Sport School Stadium	15°44′33″N 100°07′56″E
Uttaradit Saksiam	Uttaradit (Mueang)	Uttaradit Provincial Stadium	17°36′34″N 100°06′39″E
Wat Bot City	Phitsanulok (Wat Bot)	H2H Sport Stadium	16°58′52″N 100°19′35″E

=== Foreign players ===
A T3 team could register 3 foreign players from foreign players all around the world. A team can use 3 foreign players on the field in each game.

Note :
(substituted off) : players who released during second leg transfer window;
(substituted in) : players who registered during second leg transfer window.

AFC member countries players.
CAF member countries players.
CONCACAF member countries players.
CONMEBOL member countries players.
OFC member countries players.
UEFA member countries players.
No foreign player registered.

Club	Leg	Player 1	Player 2	Player 3
Chiangrai City	1st		(Japan) Ryuji Hirota (substituted off)	(Hong Kong) Leung Yau Wai
Chiangrai City	2nd	(Brazil) Tiago Severino da Silva (substituted in)	(Japan) Masataka Nishimoto (substituted in)	(Hong Kong) Leung Yau Wai
Chiangrai Lanna	1st		(Russia) Aleksandr Shurchilin (substituted off)	(Egypt) Mohamed Abdelfattah (substituted off)
Chiangrai Lanna	2nd	(South Korea) Lee Gi-been (substituted in)	(Ivory Coast) Doukoure N'Gro Molaye (substituted in)	(Egypt) Basam Radwan Mahmoud Mohamed Afify (substituted in)
Kamphaengphet	1st	(Myanmar) Kaung Htet Soe (substituted off)	(Myanmar) Yan Lin Aung (substituted off)	(Japan) Yusuke Suzuki
Kamphaengphet	2nd	(Japan) Masaya Tahara (substituted in)	(Japan) Yuto Yoshijima (substituted in)	(Japan) Yusuke Suzuki
Kongkrailas United	1st	(Egypt) Mahmoud Ahmed Amer (substituted off)	(South Korea) Heo Seung-min (substituted off)	(Iran) Sadegh Eskandarikhanghahi
Kongkrailas United	2nd		(Nigeria) Omotosho Shola Jimmy (substituted in)	(Iran) Sadegh Eskandarikhanghahi
Maejo United	1st	(Brazil) Tone Edson Teixeira de Oliveira (substituted off)	(Brazil) Alberto Moreira Gouvea (substituted off)	(Guinea) Maiga Diabate Ibrahima Saydou
Maejo United	2nd	(Ivory Coast) Oumar Sanou (substituted in)	(Guinea) Barry Lelouma (substituted in)	(Guinea) Maiga Diabate Ibrahima Saydou
Nakhon Mae Sot United	1st	(Cameroon) Abbo Bouba (substituted off)	(Egypt) Morsy Mohamed (substituted off)	(Cameroon) Tewidikum Tah Nivan
Nakhon Mae Sot United	2nd	(Togo) Ekue Andre Houma (substituted in)	(Japan) Shohei Kawakami (substituted in)	(Cameroon) Tewidikum Tah Nivan
Nan	1st	(Japan) Masaya Tahara (substituted off)
Nan	2nd
Phitsanulok	1st	(Argentina) Nicolás Vélez (substituted off)	(Brazil) Gilberto Macena	(Brazil) Mairon Natan Pereira Maciel Oliveira
Phitsanulok	2nd	(Brazil) Ramon Mesquita (substituted in)	(Brazil) Gilberto Macena	(Brazil) Mairon Natan Pereira Maciel Oliveira
Rongseemaechaithanachotiwat Phayao	1st	(Japan) Tsukasa Watanabe (substituted off)	(Japan) Seiya Miyazaki (substituted off)	(Japan) Hibiki Kishimoto
Rongseemaechaithanachotiwat Phayao	2nd	(Iran) Eiman Kaabi (substituted in)	(Iran) Ali Jafarian (substituted in)	(Japan) Hibiki Kishimoto
See Khwae City	1st	(Iran) Amirmohammad Karamdar (substituted off)	(Iran) Hamzeh Sari (substituted off)	(France) Alexander Claude Jacq
See Khwae City	2nd	(Cameroon) Ngang Anlaa Elysee (substituted in)	(Liberia) Leon Sullivan Taylor (substituted in)	(France) Alexander Claude Jacq
Uttaradit Saksiam	1st	(Brazil) Rafael Anunciação de Santana (substituted off)	(Brazil) Carlos Reginaldo da Silva (substituted off)	(Ivory Coast) Serge William Viera M'Boa
Uttaradit Saksiam	2nd	(Belize) Giuberty Silva Neves (substituted in)	(Ivory Coast) Diarra Junior Aboubacar (substituted in)	(Ivory Coast) Serge William Viera M'Boa
Wat Bot City	1st	(Iran) Milad Sasani Nezhad (substituted off)	(Ivory Coast) Diarrassouba Hamed de Silci	(Brazil) Jose Magson Bezerra Dourado
Wat Bot City	2nd	(Nigeria) Debiro Dzarma Bata (substituted in)	(Ivory Coast) Diarrassouba Hamed de Silci	(Brazil) Jose Magson Bezerra Dourado

== League table ==
=== Standings ===
Pos	Team	Pld	W	D	L	GF	GA	GD	Pts	Qualification or relegation
1	Phitsanulok (C, Q)	22	17	5	0	60	17	+43	56	Qualification to the National Championship stage
2	Uttaradit Saksiam (Q)	22	15	3	4	45	19	+26	48	Qualification to the National Championship stage
3	Rongseemaechaithanachotiwat Phayao	22	11	5	6	40	32	+8	38	
4	Wat Bot City	22	11	4	7	35	23	+12	37	
5	Nan (R)	22	9	6	7	22	20	+2	33 (Note: Nan ahead on head-to-head points record; Nan 6 pts, See Khwae City 0 pts.)	Relegation to the Thailand Semi-Pro League
6	See Khwae City	22	8	9	5	25	22	+3	33	
7	Maejo United	22	8	6	8	25	22	+3	30	
8	Chiangrai City	22	7	7	8	29	31	−2	28	
9	Kamphaengphet	22	5	5	12	20	34	−14	20	
10	Nakhon Mae Sot United	22	4	7	11	12	25	−13	19	
11	Kongkrailas United	22	3	5	14	15	39	−24	14	
12	Chiangrai Lanna (R)	22	2	2	18	20	64	−44	8	Relegation to the Thailand Semi-Pro League

Source: Thai League
Rules for classification: 1) Points; 2) Head-to-head points; 3) Head-to-head goal difference; 4) Head-to-head goal scored; 5) Overall goal difference; 6) Overall goal scored; 7) Fair play points; 8) Play-off without extra time).
(C) Champions; (Q) Qualified for the phase indicated; (R) Relegated

=== Positions by round ===
Team ╲ Round	1	2	3	4	5	6	7	8	9	10	11	12	13	14	15	16	17	18	19	20	21	22
Phitsanulok	2	1	1	1	1	1	1	1	1	1	1	1	1	1	1	1	1	1	1	1	1	1
Uttaradit Saksiam	1	3	2	2	2	2	2	2	2	2	2	2	2	2	2	2	2	2	2	2	2	2
Rongseemaechaithanachotiwat Phayao	11	8	8	8	10	10	10	10	11	10	8	8	6	5	6	4	4	4	4	3	3	3
Wat Bot City	3	2	3	4	3	3	3	3	3	3	3	3	3	3	3	3	3	3	3	4	4	4
Nan	9	11	11	10	9	6	7	6	7	4	4	4	5	7	7	7	5	7	5	5	7	5
See Khwae City	5	4	4	3	4	5	4	4	4	6	5	5	4	4	4	5	6	6	7	6	6	6
Maejo United	12	10	10	9	7	7	8	7	6	7	6	6	7	6	5	6	7	5	6	7	5	7
Chiangrai City	7	7	7	5	5	4	5	5	5	5	7	7	8	9	9	8	8	8	8	8	8	8
Kamphaengphet	4	5	5	7	8	9	6	9	8	9	11	9	9	8	8	9	10	10	10	9	9	9
Nakhon Mae Sot United	6	6	6	6	6	8	9	8	9	8	9	10	10	10	11	10	9	9	9	10	10	10
Kongkrailas United	10	9	9	11	11	12	11	11	10	11	10	11	11	11	10	11	11	11	11	11	11	11
Chiangrai Lanna	8	12	12	12	12	11	12	12	12	12	12	12	12	12	12	12	12	12	12	12	12	12

Source: Thai League
= Qualification to the National Championship stage; = Relegation to the Thailand Amateur League

=== Results by round ===
Team ╲ Round	1	2	3	4	5	6	7	8	9	10	11	12	13	14	15	16	17	18	19	20	21	22
Phitsanulok	W	W	W	W	D	W	W	W	W	W	W	W	W	W	W	D	W	D	D	D	W	W
Uttaradit Saksiam	W	D	W	W	W	W	W	L	W	D	L	W	W	W	W	W	L	D	W	L	W	W
Rongseemaechaithanachotiwat Phayao	L	D	D	D	L	D	L	L	L	W	W	W	W	W	D	W	W	W	W	W	W	L
Wat Bot City	W	W	D	L	W	L	W	W	L	W	L	W	W	W	D	D	L	W	L	L	D	W
Nan	L	L	D	D	D	W	D	W	D	W	W	L	D	L	L	W	W	L	W	W	L	W
See Khwae City	W	D	D	W	D	L	W	D	L	D	W	L	W	L	W	L	D	D	D	W	D	W
Maejo United	L	D	D	D	W	L	L	W	W	L	W	D	L	W	W	L	D	W	L	D	W	L
Chiangrai City	L	D	D	W	D	W	L	D	W	D	L	L	D	L	L	W	L	D	W	W	L	W
Kamphaengphet	W	D	L	L	L	D	W	L	D	L	L	W	L	W	L	L	D	D	L	W	L	L
Nakhon Mae Sot United	W	D	L	D	D	L	L	W	L	D	L	D	L	L	L	W	W	D	D	L	L	L
Kongkrailas United	L	D	D	L	D	L	D	L	W	L	W	L	L	L	W	L	L	L	D	L	L	L
Chiangrai Lanna	L	L	D	L	L	W	L	L	L	L	L	L	L	L	L	L	D	L	L	L	W	L

Source: Thai League
W = Won; D = Drawn; L = Lost

=== Results ===
Home \ Away	CRC	CRL	KPP	KKL	MJU	NMS	NAN	PLK	RMP	SKC	UTD	WBC
Chiangrai City	—	1–0	5–1	0–1	1–0	1–0	0–0	0–2	0–1	1–1	2–2	2–0
Chiangrai Lanna	1–3	—	1–1	3–0	0–1	0–3	0–2	0–3	1–1	1–2	1–3	1–3
Kamphaengphet	2–1	3–0	—	3–2	0–3	0–0	0–1	1–2	0–2	3–0	0–1	0–1
Kongkrailas United	0–0	3–0	1–1	—	1–2	2–0	1–2	0–3	0–2	0–0	0–3	0–1
Maejo United	1–2	4–0	2–1	1–0	—	1–1	1–1	1–1	4–2	0–1	1–2	0–2
Nakhon Mae Sot United	2–2	0–3	1–0	0–0	0–0	—	1–0	1–3	1–2	0–0	0–2	1–0
Nan	0–0	2–1	0–0	1–1	0–2	2–0	—	1–1	0–2	2–1	2–1	1–2
Phitsanulok	2–1	7–3	6–1	9–0	1–0	2–0	2–1	—	3–1	1–1	3–1	4–2
Rongseemaechaithanachotiwat Phayao	4–1	4–2	1–1	4–3	1–0	1–1	1–2	0–2	—	2–1	3–2	1–1
See Khwae City	2–2	3–1	1–0	1–0	1–1	2–0	0–1	1–2	3–3	—	1–0	2–1
Uttaradit Saksiam	4–2	7–0	2–0	1–0	4–0	1–0	2–1	1–1	2–1	0–0	—	3–1
Wat Bot City	5–2	8–1	1–2	2–0	0–0	1–0	1–0	0–0	2–1	1–1	0–1	—

Source: Thai League
Legend: Blue = home team win; Yellow = draw; Red = away team win.
For upcoming matches, an "a" indicates there is an article about the rivalry between the two participants.

== Season statistics ==
=== Top scorers ===
As of 18 March 2023.

Rank	Player	Club	Goals
1	(Thailand) Saran Sridet	Rongseemaechaithanachotiwat Phayao	16
2	(Brazil) Gilberto Macena	Phitsanulok	11
2	(Argentina) Nicolás Vélez	Phitsanulok	11
2	(Thailand) Phufah Chuenkomrak	Uttaradit Saksiam	11
5	(Thailand) Chatchai Narkwijit	Uttaradit Saksiam	10
6	(Thailand) Chainarong Samuttha	Kongkrailas United (4), Uttaradit Saksiam (5)	9

=== Hat-tricks ===
Player	For	Against	Result	Date
(Thailand) Saran Sridet	Rongseemaechaithanachotiwat Phayao	See Khwae City	3–3 (A)	17 September 2022
(Argentina) Nicolás Vélez^{5}	Phitsanulok	Kongkrailas United	9–0 (H)	2 October 2022
(Egypt) Basam Radwan Mahmoud Mohamed Afify	Chiangrai Lanna	Kongkrailas United	3–0 (H)	11 March 2023

Notes: ^{5} = Player scored 5 goals; (H) = Home team; (A) = Away team

=== Clean sheets ===
As of 18 March 2023.

Rank	Player	Club	Clean sheets
1	(Thailand) Weerapong Lapkhaw	Uttaradit Saksiam	9
2	(Thailand) Panut Bunlang	Wat Bot City	8
3	(Thailand) Farus Patee	Chiangrai City	6
3	(Thailand) Surasak Thongoon	Phitsanulok	6
5	(Thailand) Jiraphat Kamon	Nan	5
5	(Thailand) Wichitchai Raksa	Rongseemaechaithanachotiwat Phayao	5

== Attendances ==
=== Overall statistical table ===
Pos	Team	Total	High	Low	Average	Change
1	Phitsanulok	11,633	2,325	1	1,058	n/a
2	Rongseemaechaithanachotiwat Phayao	7,746	1,100	1	705	n/a
3	Uttaradit Saksiam	4,632	1,089	207	422	n/a
4	See Khwae City	2,607	520	100	326	n/a
5	Kongkrailas United	1,750	300	80	195	n/a
6	Wat Bot City	1,929	570	90	193	n/a
7	Nakhon Mae Sot United	1,806	234	100	165	n/a
8	Chiangrai City	1,270	340	30	159	n/a
9	Nan	1,569	285	59	143	n/a
10	Maejo United	1,410	500	50	141	n/a
11	Kamphaengphet	1,487	350	51	136	n/a
12	Chiangrai Lanna	1,259	300	35	126	n/a
	League total	39,098	2,325	1	324	n/a

Source: Thai League
