= Chiangrai Lanna F.C. =

Chiangrai Lanna เชียงราย ล้านนา
- Full name: Chiangrai Lanna Football Club
- Nicknames: The Mangrai's War Elephants (ช้างศึกพญามังราย)
- Founded: 2018; 7 years ago
- Ground: Chiangrai Provincial Stadium; Chiangrai, Thailand
- Coordinates: 19°54′48″N 99°51′21″E
- Chairman: Worachat Cheunchob
- Head coach: Nirut Srithong
- League: Thailand Semi-pro League
- 2022–23: Thai League 3, 12th of 12 in the Northern region (relegated)
- Website: web.facebook.com/Adcrlnvii

Chiangrai Lanna F.C. (Chiangrai Lanna Football Club) (Thai สโมสรฟุตบอลเชียงราย ล้านนา), is a Thai professional football club based in Mueang, Chiangrai, Thailand. The club is currently playing in the Thai League 3 Northern region.

== History ==
In 2018, the amateur club was founded.

In 2019, the club began to compete in the 2019 Thailand Amateur League Northern region, using Chiangrai Provincial Stadium as the ground. At the end of the season, they have promoted to the 2020–21 Thai League 3.

In 2020, the club become a professional football club. Chiangrai Lanna competed in the Thai League 3 for the 2020–21 season. In late December 2020, the Coronavirus disease 2019 or also known as COVID-19 had spread again in Thailand, the FA Thailand must abruptly end the regional stage of the Thai League 3. The club has finished the 11th place of the Northern region. In the 2020 Thai League Cup, Chiangrai Lanna have competed for this tournament but they have defeated to Kamphaengphet in the first qualification round. However, the FA Thailand must cancel the Thai League Cup this year due to the spreading of COVID-19.

In 2021, the 2021–22 season is the second consecutive season in the Thai League 3 of Chiangrai Lanna. They started the season with a 1–0 home won over Nakhon Mae Sot United and they ended the season with a 1–2 away defeated to the Nakhon Mae Sot United. The club has finished tenth place in the league of the Northern region. In addition, in the 2021–22 Thai League Cup Chiangrai Lanna defeated 0–10 to Uthai Thani in the second qualifying round, causing them to be eliminated.

In 2022, the 2022–23 season is the third consecutive season in the Thai League 3 of Chiangrai Lanna and they have changed the club's logo this season. Chiangrai Lanna competed in the Thai League 3 for the 2022–23 season. It is their 3rd season in the professional league. The club started the season with a 1–2 home defeat to See Khwae City and they ended the season with a 1–3 away defeat to See Khwae City. The club has finished 12th place in the league of the Northern region and relegated to the lower division in next season. In addition, in the 2022–23 Thai League Cup Chiangrai Lanna was defeated 1–5 by Uttaradit Saksiam in the second qualification round, causing them to be eliminated.

== Stadium and locations ==
Coordinates	Location	Stadium	Year
19°54′48″N 99°51′21″E	Rop Wiang, Mueang, Chiangrai	Chiangrai Provincial Stadium	2019 – present

== Season by season record ==
Season	League									FA Cup	League Cup	Top goalscorer	
Season	Division	P	W	D	L	F	A	Pts	Pos	FA Cup	League Cup	Name	Goals
2019	TA North	3	2	1	0	10	2	7	2nd	Not enter	Can't Enter		
2020–21	T3 North	15	2	2	11	7	26	8	11th	Not enter	QR1	(Thailand) Tanawit Kamjoi, (Thailand) Phitsanusak Chuenbua-in	2
2021–22	T3 North	22	4	6	12	16	38	18	10th	Not enter	QR2	(Thailand) Tanawit Kamjoi	6
2022–23	T3 North	22	2	2	18	20	64	8	12th	Not enter	QR2	(Egypt) Basam Radwan Mahmoud Mohamed Afify	4

Champions	Runners-up	Promoted	Relegated

- P = Played
- W = Games won
- D = Games drawn
- L = Games lost
- F = Goals for
- A = Goals against
- Pts = Points
- Pos = Final position
- QR1 = First Qualifying Round
- QR2 = Second Qualifying Round
- R1 = Round 1
- R2 = Round 2
- R3 = Round 3
- R4 = Round 4
- R5 = Round 5
- R6 = Round 6
- QF = Quarter-finals
- SF = Semi-finals
- RU = Runners-up
- W = Winners

== Players ==
=== Current squad ===
Note: Flags indicate national team as defined under FIFA eligibility rules; some limited exceptions apply. Players may hold more than one non-FIFA nationality.

No.	Pos.	Nation	Player
4	FW	THA	Phirawik Thinsuk
10	MF	THA	Sutthipong Yothadee
13	GK	THA	Kritsakorn Jaikham

No.	Pos.	Nation	Player
21	FW	KOR	Lee Gi-Been
32	DF	THA	Nawabzada Mir Jamal Khan Raisani
42	DF	CIV	Doukoure N'Gro Molaye
96	FW	EGY	Basam Radwan Mahmoud Mohamed Afify
