= Naphat Deeprasert =

Thai footballer (born 1996)

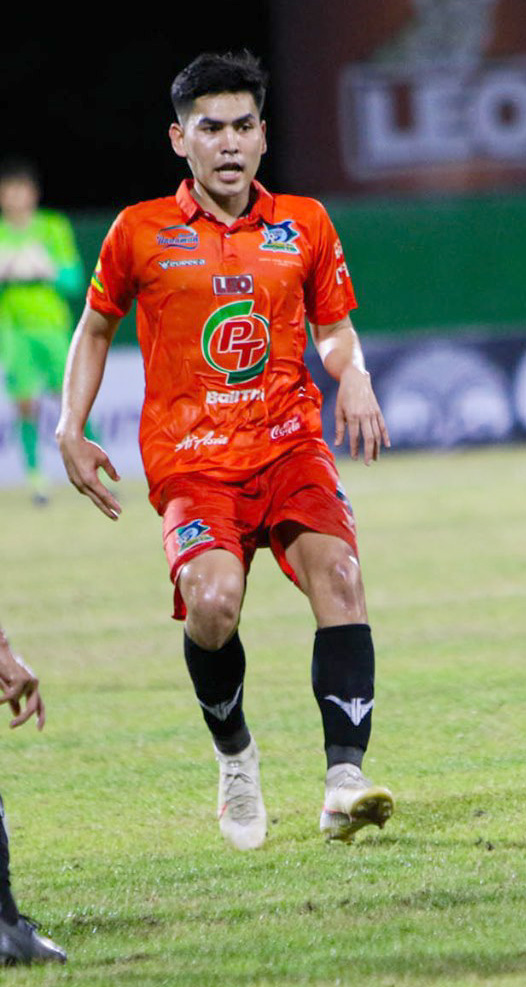
- Naphat Deeprasert (Ranong United FC) in a match against Navy FC in March 2021

Personal information
- Full name: Naphat Deeprasert
- Date of birth: 7 August 1996 (age 30)
- Place of birth: Thailand
- Position: Midfielder

Team information
- Current team: Northern Nakhon Mae Sot United
- Number: 6

Senior career*
| Years | Team | Apps | (Gls) |
| 2016 | Ratchaburi | 1 | (0) |
| 2017 | Chainat | 2 | (0) |
| 2018 | Suphanburi | 1 | (0) |
| 2019 | Rayong | 2 | (0) |
| 2020–2021 | Ranong United | 23 | (1) |
| 2021–2022 | Lamphun Warrior | 11 | (0) |
| 2022–2025 | Phitsanulok | 54 | (0) |
| 2025– | Northern Nakhon Mae Sot United | 12 | (0) |
- * Club domestic league appearances and goals as of 22 March 2026

Naphat Deeprasert (Thai: นภัทร ดีประเสริฐ; born August 7, 1996), formerly known as Todsawee Deeprasert (Thai: ทศวี หรือ นภัทร ดีประเสริฐ), is a Thai professional footballer who plays for Northern Nakhon Mae Sot United in Thai League 3 as a midfielder.

== Honours ==
Phitsanulok

- Thai League 3 Northern Region: 2022–23
