= Narong Jansawek =

Thai footballer (born 1986)

Personal information
- Full name: Narong Jansawek
- Date of birth: 10 August 1986 (age 40)
- Place of birth: Suphan Buri, Thailand
- Height: 1.71 m (5 ft 7 1/2 in)
- Positions: Attacking midfielder; right winger

Youth career
- 2002–2004: Banharn-Jamsai Wittaya 1 School

Senior career*
| Years | Team | Apps | (Gls) |
| 2005–2008 | Suphanburi | 62 | (7) |
| 2009–2011 | TTM Phichit | 47 | (15) |
| 2012 | Army United | 13 | (2) |
| 2013–2014 | Osotspa Saraburi | 61 | (3) |
| 2015 | Bangkok Glass | 26 | (1) |
| 2016–2017 | Chonburi | 34 | (2) |
| 2018–2021 | Police Tero | 50 | (4) |
| 2021–2022 | Uthai Thani | 26 | (0) |
| 2022 | Krabi | 16 | (1) |
| 2023–2024 | Uthai Thani | 49 | (1) |
| 2024 | Nakhon Sawan See Khwae City | 0 | (0) |
| Total | | 384 | (36) |

International career
| 2013 | Thailand | 4 | (0) |
- * Club domestic league appearances and goals as of 21 April 2023

Narong Jansawek (Thai: ณรงค์ จันเสวก, born August 10, 1986), simply known as Yo (Thai: โย), is a Thai retired professional footballer who plays as an attacking midfielder.

== International career ==
In 2013, he was called up to the national team by Surachai Jaturapattarapong to the 2015 AFC Asian Cup qualification. In October, 2013 he debut for Thailand in a friendly match against Bahrain. On October 15, 2013, he played against Iran in the 2015 AFC Asian Cup qualification.

=== International ===
As of 12 November 2015

| National team | Year | Apps | Goals |
|---|---|---|---|
| Thailand | 2013 | 4 | 0 |
| Thailand | Total | 4 | 0 |

== Honours ==
=== Club ===
Uthai Thani

- Thai League 3 (1): 2021–22
- Thai League 3 Northern Region (1): 2021–22
