= Nakhon Sawan See Khwae City F.C. =

Association football club in Thailand

Nakhon Sawan See Khwae City นครสวรรค์ สี่แคว ซิตี้
- Full name: Nakhon Sawan See Khwae City Football Club
- Nicknames: The Engkor Warriors (นักรบเอ็งกอ)
- Founded: 2019; 7 years ago, as See Khwae City Football Club; 2023; 3 years ago, as Nakhon Sawan See Khwae City Football Club
- Ground: Nakhon Sawan Sports School Stadium; Nakhon Sawan, Thailand
- Capacity: 5,000
- Coordinates: 15°44′33″N 100°07′56″E
- Chairman: Meesak Niyom
- Head coach: Sanong Tangngam
- League: Thai League 3
- 2025–26: Thai League 3, 12th of 12 in the Northern region

Nakhon Sawan See Khwae City Football Club (Thai: สโมสรฟุตบอลนครสวรรค์ สี่แคว ซิตี้) is a Thai professional football club based in Mueang, Nakhon Sawan, Thailand. The club is currently playing in the Thai League 3 Northern region.

== History ==
In 2019, the club was established and competed in Thailand Amateur League Northern region, used Nakhon Sawan Sports School Stadium as ground. At the end of the season, the Phitsanulok provincial sports club that competing in the same division as the See Khwae City football club could promote a higher division (T3) for next season but they are not ready to compete in a higher division. So, The Phitsanulok provincial sports club had sold the right to the See Khwae City football club.

In 2020, the club become a professional football club, they began to selected youth players to training in the club's academy. See Khwae City competing in the Thai League 3 for the 2020–21 season by replacing the Phitsanulok provincial sports club. On October, 25th 2020, See Khwae City against Wat Bot City in the Thai League 3 Northern region, a player of See Khwae City has kicked the penalty kick out away because he thinks that penalty kick was unfair. In late December 2020, the Coronavirus disease 2019 or also known as COVID-19 had spread again in Thailand, the FA Thailand must abruptly end the regional stage of the Thai League 3. The club has finished the 6th place of the Northern region. In addition, See Khwae City has competed in the 2020–21 Thai FA Cup, they could pass the qualification round but defeated to Lamphun Warrior in the first round. In the 2020 Thai League Cup, See Khwae City have competed for this tournament but they have defeated to Phitsanulok in the second qualification round. However, the FA Thailand must cancel the Thai League Cup this year due to the spreading of the COVID-19.

In 2021, the 2021–22 season is the second consecutive season in the Thai League 3 of See Khwae City.

In 2022, See Khwae City competed in the Thai League 3 for the 2022–23 season. It is their 3rd season in the professional league. The club started the season with a 2–1 away win over Chiangrai Lanna and they ended the season with a 3–1 home win over Chiangrai Lanna. The club has finished 6th place in the league of the Northern region. In addition, in the 2022–23 Thai FA Cup See Khwae City was defeated 1–3 by Lampang in the second round, causing them to be eliminated and in the 2022–23 Thai League Cup See Khwae City was defeated 0–2 by Phitsanulok in the second qualification round, causing them to be eliminated too.

== Stadium and locations ==
Coordinates	Location	Stadium	Year
15°44′33″N 100°07′56″E	Nakhon Sawan	Nakhon Sawan Sport School Stadium	2019–present

== Season by season record ==
Season	League									FA Cup	League Cup	T3 Cup	Top goalscorer	
Season	Division	P	W	D	L	F	A	Pts	Pos	FA Cup	League Cup	T3 Cup	Name	Goals
2019	TA North	3	2	0	1	4	3	6	1st	Opted out	Ineligible			
2020–21	T3 North	16	6	3	7	19	25	21	6th	R1	QR2		(Togo) Ekue Andre Houma	8
2021–22	T3 North	22	10	5	7	27	23	35	5th	R1	QR2		(Thailand) Sunchai Singsom, (Uruguay) Diego Silva, (Nigeria) Julius Chukwuma Ononiwu	6
2022–23	T3 North	22	8	9	5	25	22	33	6th	R2	QR2		(France) Alexander Claude Jacq	8
2023–24	T3 North	20	3	8	9	13	26	17	11th	Opted out	QR2	QF	(Brazil) Vinícius Silva Freitas	5
2024–25	T3 North	20	6	8	6	22	22	26	6th	Opted out	QR1	LP	(Nigeria) James Oise Jesuikhode	8
2025–26	T3 North	22	4	2	16	19	48	14	12th	R1	QR2	LP	(Thailand) Treethong Thongtong	6

Champions	Runners-up	Promoted	Relegated

- P = Played
- W = Games won
- D = Games drawn
- L = Games lost
- F = Goals for
- A = Goals against
- Pts = Points
- Pos = Final position
- QR1 = First Qualifying Round
- QR2 = Second Qualifying Round
- R1 = Round 1
- R2 = Round 2
- R3 = Round 3
- R4 = Round 4
- R5 = Round 5
- R6 = Round 6
- QF = Quarter-finals
- SF = Semi-finals
- RU = Runners-up
- W = Winners

== Players ==
=== Current squad ===
As of 1 September 2025

Note: Flags indicate national team as defined under FIFA eligibility rules; some limited exceptions apply. Players may hold more than one non-FIFA nationality.

No.	Pos.	Nation	Player
1	GK	THA	Banhan Thubthong
4	DF	THA	Parinya Greechawee
5	DF	THA	Pornchai Daengjaroen
6	MF	THA	Kitsada Otata
7	FW	THA	Sunchai Singsom
8	MF	THA	Nontawat Onsuebsai
11	MF	THA	Permyot Tokeaw
13	FW	AUS	Likassa Firaol
15	FW	THA	Anucha Sodsri
16	MF	THA	Chokthaboon Boonyakhet
17	MF	THA	Thanawat Ruamrua
18	FW	THA	Pooridech Poosampao
19	DF	THA	Wutthichai Ramphanphosri
20	DF	THA	Kirttanai Nuntapisal
22	MF	THA	Thitiphan Khanoeinham

No.	Pos.	Nation	Player
23	DF	THA	Kongsakon Sreebunpang
26	FW	THA	Prarunyoo Rojanawuttitham
27	FW	CGO	Joslyn Ghifem Katuala
28	DF	THA	Nantanat Toornee
29	DF	THA	Weerachai Takerngpol
30	DF	THA	Natthauaon Ratchasupha
31	FW	THA	Sorayut Chesakha
32	MF	THA	Tanapat Hongkhiao
39	GK	THA	Tossapol Sritecha
47	DF	THA	Ratthanan Sangnuy
49	DF	THA	Oatthawit Kamhomhun
66	MF	KOR	So Ji-hoon
78	MF	THA	Wuttichai Bunraksa
88	MF	THA	Narong Jansawek
99	GK	THA	Pratchaya Kingchan

== Coaching staff ==
Position	Staff
Head Coach	(Thailand) Sanong Tangngam
Assistant Coach	(Thailand) Jirawat Chaisom
First-Team Coach	(Thailand) Suriyapong Silapatipat (Thailand) Sorasak Dispan
Goalkeeper Coach	(Thailand) Phracha Kingchan
Technical Director	(Japan) Kazuaki Tasaka
