= Northern Nakhon Mae Sot United F.C. =

Thai football club

Northern Nakhon Mae Sot United นอร์ทเทิร์น นครแม่สอด ยูไนเต็ด
- Full name: Northern Nakhon Mae Sot United Football Club นอร์ทเทิร์น นครแม่สอด ยูไนเต็ด
- Nicknames: Kings of West (ราชันตะวันตก)
- Founded: 2016; 10 years ago, as Nakhon Mae Sot United Football Club; 2023; 3 years ago, as Northern Nakhon Mae Sot United Football Club
- Ground: Naresuan Maharaj Stadium; Tak, Thailand
- Chairman: Sappasiri Orrachaipanlarb
- Head Coach: Ekkachai Poolsri
- League: Thai League 3
- 2025–26: Thai League 3, 5th of 12 in the Northern region

Northern Nakhon Mae Sot United Football Club (Thai นอร์ทเทิร์น นครแม่สอด ยูไนเต็ด), is a Thai football club based in Mae Sot in Tak, Thailand. The club is currently playing in the Thai League 3.

== History ==
In 2022, Nakhon Mae Sot United competed in the Thai League 3 for the 2022–23 season. It is their 4th season in the professional league. The club started the season with a 1–0 home win over Nan and they ended the season with a 0–2 away defeat to Nan. The club has finished 10th place in the league of the Northern region. In addition, in the 2022–23 Thai League Cup Nakhon Mae Sot United was defeated 1–2 by Chiangrai Lanna in the first qualification round, causing them to be eliminated.

== Record ==
Season	League									FA Cup	League Cup	T3 Cup	Top goalscorer	
Season	Division	P	W	D	L	F	A	Pts	Pos	FA Cup	League Cup	T3 Cup	Name	Goals
2016	DIV3 North	3	1	1	1	13	2	4	5th	Opted out	Ineligible			
2017	TA North	7	4	3	0	20	5	15	1st	Opted out	Ineligible		(Thailand) Anupab Chimpalee	4
2018	T4 North	18	7	8	3	22	17	29	4th	R1	Opted out		(Thailand) Wichaya Pornprasart, (Thailand) Chokchai Wongchampa	3
2019	T4 North	27	10	8	9	48	26	38	6th	Opted out	QR2		(Thailand) Prasit Saenkhamiue	8
2020–21	Banned													
2021–22	T3 North	22	5	5	12	13	22	20	8th	Opted out	Opted out		(Togo) Ekue Andre Houma	3
2022–23	T3 North	22	4	7	11	12	25	19	10th	Opted out	QR1		(Thailand) Apisit Bunsrikul, (Thailand) Sakul Poonoy	2
2023–24	T3 North	20	5	8	7	23	28	23	5th	Opted out	QR1	QR2	(Togo) Ekue Andre Houma	8
2024–25	T3 North	20	6	4	10	20	31	22	8th	Opted out	R1	R16	(Togo) Ekue Andre Houma	8
2025–26	T3 North	22	7	11	4	25	20	32	5th	Opted out	QR1	LP	(Nigeria) Mubarak Mohammed Ahmed	12

Champions	Runners-up	Third Place	Promoted	Relegated

- P = Played
- W = Games won
- D = Games drawn
- L = Games lost
- F = Goals for
- A = Goals against
- Pts = Points
- Pos = Final position
- QR1 = First Qualifying Round
- QR2 = Second Qualifying Round
- R1 = Round 1
- R2 = Round 2
- R3 = Round 3
- R4 = Round 4
- R5 = Round 5
- R6 = Round 6
- QF = Quarter-finals
- SF = Semi-finals
- RU = Runners-up
- W = Winners

== Players ==
=== Current squad ===
As of 1 September 2025

Note: Flags indicate national team as defined under FIFA eligibility rules; some limited exceptions apply. Players may hold more than one non-FIFA nationality.

No.	Pos.	Nation	Player
3	DF	CMR	Tewidikum Tha Nivan
4	DF	THA	Santi Winitchop
5	DF	THA	Nattawat Khirawray
6	MF	THA	Naphat Deeprasert
7	MF	THA	Prasit Saenkhamiue
8	MF	THA	Surachat Srikamonwan
9	FW	THA	Apisit Bunsrikul
10	FW	THA	Chatchawan Kaewkanya
11	FW	THA	Thanat Tangnontanakorn
12	MF	THA	Sawat Guntama
14	MF	THA	Athisak Sumathee
16	DF	THA	Phiphat Sueaphin
17	DF	THA	Jackarin Thongpanchang
18	DF	THA	Natthaphon Puangtaptim

No.	Pos.	Nation	Player
19	GK	THA	Siriphop Jhongoonklang
21	MF	THA	Sakul Poonoy
24	MF	THA	Chunhakan Chaisana
25	GK	THA	Parinya Pomjean
29	FW	CMR	Cedrick Kaham
30	DF	THA	Pitsanu Ngamsanguan
31	DF	THA	Sichon Chompoorat
33	MF	THA	Zalim Siriardamphan
34	MF	THA	Tontrakan Tanang
37	DF	THA	Sittichai Boonsom
48	GK	THA	Narongdej Phoempoon
69	DF	THA	Jedsadakron Promkhot
70	MF	THA	Boonkerd Chaiyasin
88	DF	THA	Sujtthipong Yothadee

== Club officials ==
Position	Staff
Manager	(Thailand) Thanasorn Chuensin
Head coach	(Thailand) Ekkachai Poolsri
Assistant coach	(Thailand) Nitiphong Saisit (Thailand) Tewin Srivaree
Team Manager	(Thailand) Nathanai Chinsaranan
