= Northern Tak United F.C. =

Thai football club

Northern Tak United นอร์ทเทิร์น ตากยูไนเต็ด
- Full name: Northern Tak United Football Club สโมสรฟุตบอลนอร์ทเทิร์น ตากยูไนเต็ด
- Founded: 2016; 9 years ago
- Ground: Tak PAO. Stadium; Tak, Thailand
- League: Thailand Amateur League
- 2021–22: Thai League 3, 12th of 12 in the Northern region (relegated)

Northern Tak United Football Club (Thai สโมสรฟุตบอลนอร์ทเทิร์น ตากยูไนเต็ด), is a Thai football club based in Tak Province, Thailand. The club is currently playing in the Thailand Amateur League Northern region.

== Crest history ==
2016–2019

2020–Present

== Record ==
Season	League									FA Cup	League Cup	Top goalscorer	
Season	Division	P	W	D	L	F	A	Pts	Pos	FA Cup	League Cup	Name	Goals
2016	DIV 3 North	2	0	1	1	0	2	1	9th – 12th	Not enter	Can't Enter		
2017	TA North	1	0	0	1	0	4	0	13th – 21st	Not enter	Can't Enter		
2018	TA North	7	3	2	2	19	19	11	4th	Not enter	Can't Enter	(Thailand) Piyanat Promma; Teerawat Kamsiang	3
2019	TA North	7	4	2	1	15	5	14	3rd				
2020–21	T3 North	16	3	1	12	11	33	10	10th	Not enter	Not enter	(Thailand) Chitipat Thinnamueang	2
2021–22	T3 North	22	3	7	12	16	34	16	12th	Not enter	Not enter	(Guinea) Sylla Sekou Nana	4

Champions	Runners-up	Promoted	Relegated

== Players ==
=== Current squad ===
As of 19 September 2021

Note: Flags indicate national team as defined under FIFA eligibility rules; some limited exceptions apply. Players may hold more than one non-FIFA nationality.

No.	Pos.	Nation	Player
1	GK	THA	Asia Marasri
3	DF	THA	Phum Butsaban
6	DF	THA	Kitinun Suttiwiriyakul
7	MF	THA	Chaiwat Singlo
8	MF	THA	Chanon Boonchanda
9	FW	THA	Chaiwat Thungthong
11	FW	THA	Sakchai Chueatawanngam
13	GK	THA	Siriphop Jhongoonklang
15	DF	THA	Korakot Klamdi
16	DF	THA	Thanakon Falsong
17	DF	THA	Pongsakorn Wisit
19	MF	THA	Kanchai Areerat

No.	Pos.	Nation	Player
20	FW	THA	Chitipat Thinnamueang
21	DF	THA	Saknarin Rithjaroen (captain)
22	FW	THA	Sunchai Singsom
23	MF	THA	Worawit Nuangsawak
25	FW	GUI	Sylla Sekou Nana
25	DF	THA	Jakkrit Kaekklang
27	MF	THA	Prawin Fakchaiyaphum
28	GK	THA	Chaichan Kerdklang
30	MF	THA	Ongkarak Thongdee
31	MF	THA	Anut Inthachai
44	FW	THA	Sakul Poonoy
88	FW	BRA	Tiago Severino Da Silva
