= Leung Yau Wai =

Hong Kong footballer (born 2002)

Personal information
- Full name: Tinowaye Leung Yau Wai
- Date of birth: 13 January 2002 (age 24)
- Place of birth: Hong Kong
- Height: 1.79 m (5 ft 10 in)
- Position: Centre back

Youth career
- Yuen Long
- 2014–2017: Kitchee
- 2018: Eastern
- 2018–2020: Loures
- 2020–2022: Cova da Piedade

Senior career*
Years	Team	Apps	(Gls)
2017–2018	South China	11	(1)
2022	Chiangrai City	10	(1)
2023	Reilac Shiga	0	(0)
2024	Southern	3	(0)

International career^{‡}
2017	Hong Kong U-15	6	(1)
2018	Hong Kong U-17	3	(0)
2019	Hong Kong U-18	3	(0)
2019	Hong Kong U-19	3	(0)
2023	Hong Kong U-22	2	(0)
2023	Hong Kong U-23	6	(0)
- * Club domestic league appearances and goals as of 31 May 2024 ‡ National team caps and goals as of 9 September 2023

Tinowaye Leung Yau Wai (Chinese: 梁祐維; born 13 January 2002) is a former Hong Kong professional footballer who played as a centre back.

== Club career ==
Leung started his football career in the academies of Yuen Long, Kitchee and Eastern. He made 11 appearances for South China in the 2017–18 Hong Kong First Division League, scoring once. In September 2018, he moved to Portugal and joined Loures.

In January 2020, Leung signed a professional contract with Portuguese side Cova da Piedade. He was promoted to the Cova da Piedade under-23 squad the following February, featuring in a number of games as a substitute.

Having failed to break into the first team of Cova da Piedade, Leung moved to Thailand in August 2022, signing with Thai League 3 club Chiangrai City. He scored his first goal for Chiangrai City in October of the same year, the only goal in a 1–0 win against Maejo United.

On 19 March 2023, Leung moved to Japan and signed with Japan Football League club Reilac Shiga.

On 9 January 2024, Leung returned to Hong Kong and joined Southern.

== International career ==
Leung has represented Hong Kong at youth international level.

== Career statistics ==
=== Club ===
As of 20 November 2022.

Appearances and goals by club, season and competition
Club	Season	League			Cup		Other		Total	
Club	Season	Division	Apps	Goals	Apps	Goals	Apps	Goals	Apps	Goals
South China	2017–18	Hong Kong First Division	11	1	0	0	0	0	11	1
Chiangrai City	2022–23	Thai League 3	10	1	0	0	0	0	10	1
Career total			21	1	0	0	0	0	21	1
