= Ricardo Santos (footballer, born 1987) =

Brazilian footballer

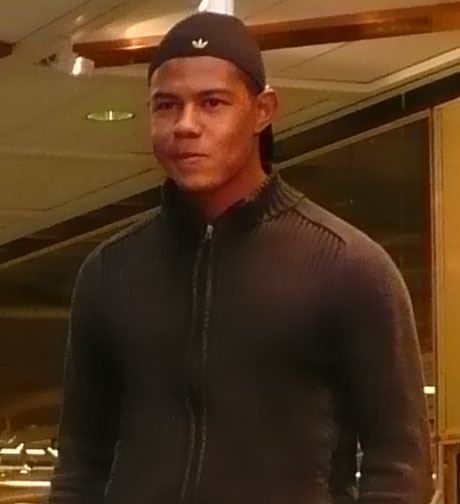
- Santos in 2007

Personal information
- Full name: Ricardo Henrique da Silva dos Santos
- Date of birth: 13 February 1987 (age 39)
- Place of birth: Volta Redonda, Brazil
- Height: 1.87 m (6 ft 1 1/2 in)
- Position: Striker

Team information
- Current team: Uthai Thani (Manager)

Youth career
- Volta Redonda FC
- Boavista SC

Senior career*
Years	Team	Apps	(Gls)
2006	Boavista SC		
2007–2011	Kalmar FF	80	(22)
2008	→ Åtvidabergs FF (loan)	27	(12)
2009	→ Jönköpings Södra IF (loan)	13	(7)
2012	Djurgårdens IF	14	(3)
2012–2013	Sogndal	25	(4)
2013–2014	Åtvidabergs FF	40	(17)
2015	Guizhou Renhe	27	(11)
2016–2017	Cerezo Osaka	41	(5)
2017	→ Cerezo Osaka U-23 (loan)	1	(0)
2018	Fagiano Okayama	15	(0)
2019	Chainat Hornbill	26	(10)
2020–2021	Trat	27	(10)
2021–2025	Uthai Thani	96	(62)
Total		432	(163)
- * Club domestic league appearances and goals

Ricardo Henrique da Silva dos Santos (Brazilian Portuguese: [ʁiˈkaʁdu ˈsɐ̃tus]; born 13 February 1987) is a Brazilian former footballer who is the manager Thai League 1 club Uthai Thani.

== Career ==
Santos came to Sweden and Kalmar FF in 2007. He was loaned out to Åtvidabergs IF the following season, where he was the top scorer at the club. Coming back to Kalmar FF when the team unsuccessfully tried to defend their title, Santos established himself in the first team for the coming two seasons. In August 2012, Santos joined Norwegian club Sogndal.

On 15 December 2014, Santos transferred to Chinese Super League side Guizhou Renhe.

He has been playing with the Japanese J League's Cerezo Osaka since 2016.

== Career statistics ==
Appearances and goals by club, season and competition
Club	Season	League			Cup		League Cup		Other		Total	
Club	Season	Division	Apps	Goals	Apps	Goals	Apps	Goals	Apps	Goals	Apps	Goals
Kalmar	2007	Allsvenskan	8	0	0	0	—		—		8	0
Kalmar	2009	Allsvenskan	14	6	0	0	—		—		14	6
Kalmar	2010	Allsvenskan	29	10	0	0	—		—		29	10
Kalmar	2011	Allsvenskan	29	6	0	0	—		—		29	6
Kalmar	Total		80	22	0	0	—		—		80	22
Åtvidaberg (loan)	2008	Superettan	27	12	0	0	—		—		27	12
Jönköping (loan)	2009	Superettan	13	7	0	0	—		—		13	7
Djurgården	2012	Allsvenskan	14	3	—		—		—		14	3
Sogndal	2012	Tippeligaen	13	2	—		—		—		13	2
Sogndal	2013	Tippeligaen	12	2	1	0	—		—		13	2
Sogndal	Total		25	4	1	0	—		—		26	4
Åtvidaberg	2013	Allsvenskan	11	1	1	1	—		—		12	2
Åtvidaberg	2014	Allsvenskan	29	16	3	3	—		—		32	19
Åtvidaberg	Total		40	17	4	4	—		—		44	21
Guizhou Renhe	2015	Chinese Super League	27	11	3	3	—		—		30	14
Cerezo Osaka	2016	J2 League	32	5	1	0	—		—		33	5
Cerezo Osaka	2017	J1 League	9	0	4	1	10	4	—		23	5
Cerezo Osaka	Total		41	5	5	1	10	4	—		56	10
Cerezo Osaka U-23 (loan)	2017	J3 League	1	0	—		—		—		1	0
Fagiano Okayama	2018	J2 League	15	0	1	0	—		—		16	0
Chainat Hornbill	2019	Thai League 1	26	10	2	0	0	0	—		28	10
Trat	2020–21	Thai League 1	27	10	3	1	—		—		30	11
Uthai Thani	2021–22	Thai League 3	7	11	3	4	3	4	—		13	19
Uthai Thani	2022–23	Thai League 2	31	28	2	0	1	0	4	2	38	30
Uthai Thani	2023–24	Thai League 1	30	16	0	0	2	1	—		32	17
Uthai Thani	2024–25	Thai League 1	28	7	1	0	2	2	—		31	9
Uthai Thani	Total		96	62	6	4	8	7	4	2	114	75
Career Total			432	163	25	13	18	11	4	2	479	189

== Honours ==
=== Club ===
Uthai Thani

- Thai League 3 (1): 2021–22
- Thai League 3 Northern Region (1): 2021–22

=== Individual ===
- Thai League 2 Top Scorer: 2022–23
