= Takeshi Miki =

Japanese footballer

Personal information
- Date of birth: 8 April 1986 (age 40)
- Place of birth: Mitaka, Tokyo, Japan
- Height: 1.71 m (5 ft 7 in)
- Position: Defender

Youth career
- Tokyo Metropolitan Mitaka; Secondary School

Senior career*
Years	Team	Apps	(Gls)
2005–2007	FC Ome		
2008	Boreham Wood		
2009	Albirex Niigata Singapore	4	(0)
2010	Lopburi		
2010–2011	Suphanburi		
2011	FC Ome		
2011–2012	UNIS Vogošća		
2012	Sloboda Tuzla	1	(0)
2012–2014	UNIS Vogošća		
2014–2015	Stupnik		
2015–2017	Val		
2017	Krka	5	(0)
2017–2018	Dugo Selo		
2020–2021	Wat Bot City	6	(0)
2022	Muang Trang United	6	(0)
- * Club domestic league appearances and goals as of 19 November 2022 (UTC)

Takeshi Miki (三木健, Miki Takeshi; born 8 April 1986) is a Japanese footballer.

== Career statistics ==
=== Club ===
Club	Season	League			National Cup		League Cup		Other		Total	
Club	Season	Division	Apps	Goals	Apps	Goals	Apps	Goals	Apps	Goals	Apps	Goals
Albirex Niigata Singapore	2009	S.League	4	0	0	0	0	0	0	0	4	0
Sloboda Tuzla	2011–12	Liga 12	1	0	0	0	0	0	0	0	1	0
Krka	2016–17	2. SNL	5	0	0	0	0	0	0	0	5	0
Career total			10	0	0	0	0	0	0	0	10	0
