= Nakhon Sawan Sports School Stadium =

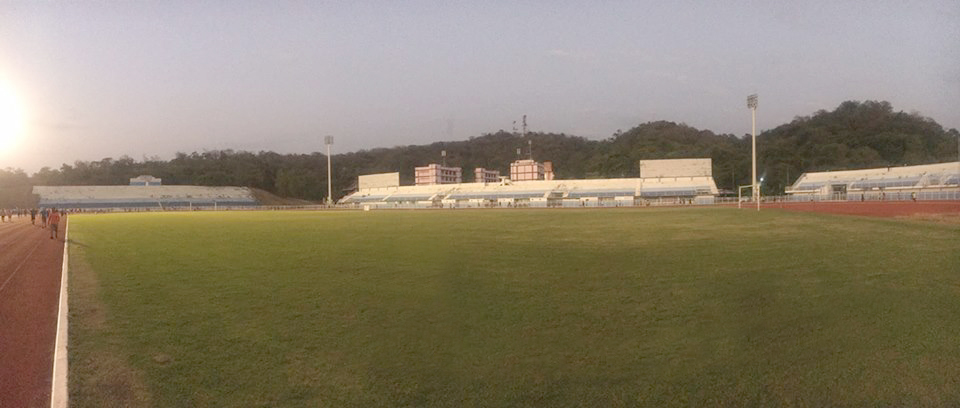
- Interactive map of Nakhon Sawan Sports School Stadium
- Location: Nakhon Sawan, Thailand
- Coordinates: 15°44′32″N 100°07′56″E
- Capacity: 5,000
- Surface: Grass

Tenant
- Nakhon Sawan See Khwae City F.C.

Nakhon Sawan Sports School Stadium (Thai: สนามโรงเรียนกีฬาจังหวัดนครสวรรค์) is a multi-purpose stadium in Nakhon Sawan, Thailand. It is currently used mostly for football matches and is the home stadium of Nakhon Sawan See Khwae City F.C. The stadium holds 5,000 people.
