= Phitsanulok Unity F.C. =

Thai football club

Phitsanulok Unity พิษณุโลก ยูนิตี้
- Full name: Phitsanulok Unity Football club สโมสรฟุตบอลพิษณุโลก ยูนิตี้
- Nicknames: Ong Dam's Fighting Cock (ไก่ชนองค์ดำ)
- Founded: 2018; 8 years ago, as Wat Bot City; 2023; 3 years ago, as Phitsanulok Unity
- Ground: Pibulsongkram Rajabhat University Stadium; Phitsanulok, Thailand
- Chairman: Tanongsak Noykor
- Head coach: Isawa Singhthong
- League: Thai League 3
- 2024–25: Thai League 3, 11th of 11 in the Northern region (relegated)

Phitsanulok Unity Football Club (Thai สโมสรฟุตบอลพิษณุโลก ยูนิตี้) is a Thai football club based in Phitsanulok province.

== History ==
In 2018, the club has established by a football fan in Wat Bot, Phitsanulok and competed in Thailand Amateur League Northern region. In the end of season, the club has promoted to Thai League 4 (also known as Omsin League). In 2019, the club has moved their ground to the Pibulsongkram Rajabhat University Stadium. They competed in Thai League 4 Northern region and finished in the 2nd place, qualified to the champions league stage. The club is planning to construct an own stadium in Wat Bot, Phitsanulok. In the end of 2019 season, Wat Bot City was promoted to the Thai League 3. In addition, at the end of 2019 season, Wat Bot City was the champion of Thai League 4 Champions League.

The club started the season with a 2–0 home win over Kongkrailas United and they ended the season with a 1–0 away win over Kongkrailas United. The club has finished 4th place in the league of the Northern region. In addition, in the 2022–23 Thai FA Cup Wat Bot City was defeated 0–1 by Uthai Thani in the third round, causing them to be eliminated and in the 2022–23 Thai League Cup Wat Bot City was defeated 1–3 by Rayong in the qualification play-off round, causing them to be eliminated too. In 2023, Wat Bot City was rebranded as Phitsanulok United. However, a year later the club redesigned its logo, symbolizing King Naresuan the Great's legendary fighting cock.

== Stadiums and locations ==
Coordinates	Location	Stadium	Year
16°49′54″N 100°12′45″E	Phitsanulok	Phra Ong Dam Stadium	2018
16°49′54″N 100°12′47″E	Phitsanulok	Pibulsongkram Rajabhat University Stadium	2019 – present

== Season by season record ==
Season	League									FA Cup	League Cup	T3 Cup	Top goalscorer	
Season	Division	P	W	D	L	F	A	Pts	Pos	FA Cup	League Cup	T3 Cup	Name	Goals
2018	TA North	6	2	3	1	19	15	9	2nd	Opted out	Ineligible		(Thailand) Sathaporn Jueachan	4
2019	T4 North	27	17	7	3	65	24	58	2nd	R1	QR1		(Thailand) Natthawut Nueamai	11
2020–21	T3 North	16	8	0	8	25	17	24	5th	R2	QR1		(Brazil) Rafinha	12
2021–22	T3 North	22	8	11	3	26	26	35	4th	Opted out	Opted out		(Republic of the Congo) Burnel Okana-Stazi	10
2022–23	T3 North	22	11	4	7	35	23	37	4th	R3	QRP		(Thailand) Anucha Phantong	9
2023–24	T3 North	20	12	7	1	33	18	43	1st	R3	Opted out	Opted out	(Iraq) Selwan Al-Jaberi	9
2024–25	T3 North	20	4	3	13	23	36	15	11th	Opted out	QRP	LP	(Brazil) Luan Borges	6

Champions	Runners-up	Promoted	Relegated

- P = Played
- W = Games won
- D = Games drawn
- L = Games lost
- F = Goals for
- A = Goals against
- Pts = Points
- Pos = Final position
- QR1 = First Qualifying Round
- QR2 = Second Qualifying Round
- R1 = Round 1
- R2 = Round 2
- R3 = Round 3
- R4 = Round 4
- R5 = Round 5
- R6 = Round 6
- QF = Quarter-finals
- SF = Semi-finals
- RU = Runners-up
- W = Winners

== Players (2024) ==
Note: Flags indicate national team as defined under FIFA eligibility rules; some limited exceptions apply. Players may hold more than one non-FIFA nationality.

No.	Pos.	Nation	Player
4	DF	THA	Piyaboot Sornprasit
5	GK	THA	Suphat Seangprachan
6	DF	THA	Charukit Sripirom
7	FW	THA	Kunburus Sounses
8	FW	THA	Sivapon Sittisak
9	FW	THA	Suriphat Thaensopa
10	FW	THA	Rachen Kunkhong
11	MF	BRA	Moreira
15	DF	THA	Naris Klaysub
16	MF	THA	Yutthakan Sisongkhram
17	DF	THA	Jirapak Saradee
18	GK	THA	Nattanon Thanomputthisak
19	DF	THA	Ponlawat Pinkong
20	DF	THA	Nittasit Choosai
21	MF	THA	Sonyam Amonphong
24	DF	THA	Ittipol Janpang-ngern

No.	Pos.	Nation	Player
25	MF	THA	Premsak Chantum
27	MF	THA	Tochiao Yodthong
29	FW	CIV	Aboubacar Diarra Junior
30	MF	THA	Rutchapron Kaewgrajang
31	GK	THA	Panut Bunlang
32	MF	THA	Komsun Sueajouy
34	MF	THA	Akkaradech Satarntung
36	DF	CIV	Hamed Diarrassouba
47	MF	THA	Praphatphong Phonto
56	DF	THA	Thanadon Sukkon
77	MF	THA	Woraphol Thongruang
81	GK	THA	Natthasorn Pengkham
88	MF	THA	Thanick Khamkien
90	MF	THA	Athip Kaeochaeng
99	MF	THA	Sutthiwarakul Papan

== Club officials (2024) ==
Position	Staff
Chairman	(Thailand) Tanongsak Noykor
Team manager	(Thailand) Nawattham Jantanupan
Technical advisor	(Thailand) Ekachai Poolsri
Head coach	(Thailand) Isawa Singhthong
Assistant coach	(Thailand) Pichet Hawkongkaew (Thailand) Pitiya Kaewklam (Thailand) Suphach Ruangrung
Goalkeeper coach	(Thailand) Suradet Atiwongpitak
Doctor	(Thailand) Piya Kraithong
Team staff	(Thailand) Weeraporn Sriwang (Thailand) Akkarapan Santipromwong (Thailand) Supat Suttisanipan (Thailand) Tarathep Khamsookdee
Club president	(Thailand) Thanongsak Noiko
Vice president	(Thailand) Chanchai Hakaew
Club secretary	(Thailand) Chanyanooch Srichaona
General coordinator	(Thailand) Worawit Wongprasert
Security officer	(Thailand) Artit Tarasak
Media officer	(Thailand) Wasukit Boonyakan
Public relations officer	(Thailand) Sittichai Dachasiri
Photographer	(Thailand) Khamakhom Phumfang
Videographer	(Thailand) Channarong Tomklan

== Honours ==
=== Domestic ===
- Thai League 3 Northern Region
  - Winners (1): 2023–24
- Thai League 4
  - Champions (1): 2019
