= Diego Silva (footballer, born 1987) =

Uruguayan footballer

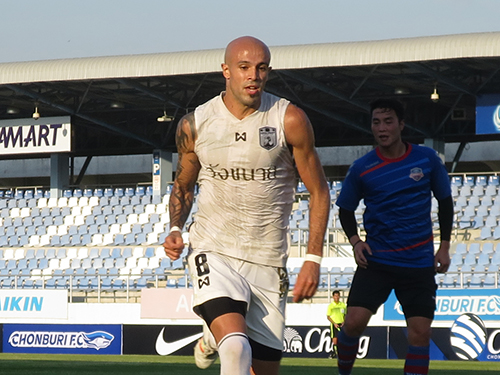

Personal information
- Full name: Diego Emiliano Silva Silva
- Date of birth: 17 May 1987 (age 39)
- Place of birth: Montevideo, Uruguay
- Height: 1.72 m (5 ft 8 in)
- Positions: Winger; forward

Team information
- Current team: AUU Inter Bangkok
- Number: 76

Senior career*
Years	Team	Apps	(Gls)
2007–2009	River Plate de Montevideo	40	(15)
2010	Astra	8	(2)
2010	Racing de Montevideo	8	(0)
2011	Centro Italo	10	(5)
2011	Marathón	8	(2)
2012	El Tanque Sisley	9	(0)
2012	Atenas de Río Cuarto	15	(3)
2013	Central Español	7	(0)
2013	AEK Kouklia	5	(0)
2014	FC Jūrmala	32	(6)
2015–2016	Lanexang United	42	(41)
2017–2018	Chainat Hornbill	28	(12)
2018	Ayutthaya United	11	(3)
2019	JS Saint-Pierroise	10	(3)
2020	Angthong F.C.	2	(0)
2020	Uthai Thani	11	(2)
2020–2021	Lampang	10	(2)
2021–2022	See Khwae City	17	(6)
2022	Samut Sakhon City	11	(5)
2023	Thawi Watthana Samut Sakhon United	9	(0)
2023	Phitsanulok	8	(0)
2023–	AUU Inter Bangkok	1	(0)
- * Club domestic league appearances and goals as of 6 August 2023

Diego Emiliano Silva Silva (born 17 May 1987 in Montevideo) is a Uruguayan professional footballer currently playing for AUU Inter Bangkok in Thai League 3.

Diego Silva in 2015 score 18 goals in 19 matches of the Lao Premier League. In the season from March to June 2016, score 9 goals in the first 10 games of the Lao Premier League. Finally finished the season 2016 in Lanexang United with 23 goals in 23 games played.

Diego in December 2016 sign a contract with Chainat Hornbill of Thailand and join the club for play in Thai League 2 in 2017. On 15 October 2017 Chainat Hornbill get the title of Champions of Thai League 2 with Diego scoring 12 goals and playing a full season of 28 games. In September 2018, Diego and Ayuttaya United were promoted to the Thai League 3 after winning the playoffs against Nara United. January 2019 Diego signs for JSSP of Reunion Island League. At his first game Diego and JSSP won the Reunion Cup trophy. June 2019 JSSP debuts at the Coupe de France with a victory and 2 goals and 1 assist by Diego.

On 12 February 2022, Diego reached the mark of 100 goals in his professional career after a Hattrick vs Northern Tak for the thai league 3.

== Biography ==
In February 2010, Silva was signed by the Romanian club Astra.

On 8 July 2013, he signed a contract with Cypriot side AEK Kouklia. Prior to the 2014 Latvian Higher League season Silva transferred to FC Jūrmala. He played 32 matches and scored 6 goals, becoming the club's top scorer in the league under the management of former Manchester United star Andrei Kanchelskis. In January 2017 Diego signs for Chainat Hornbill of Thailand. On the first 6 games from February to March in the thai league2 scored 4 goals and become the top scorer of Chainat Hornbill. On the current season Diego have scoring 10 goals in 16 games played from March to July 2017.
