= Chiangrai Province Stadium =

Multi-purpose stadium in Thailand

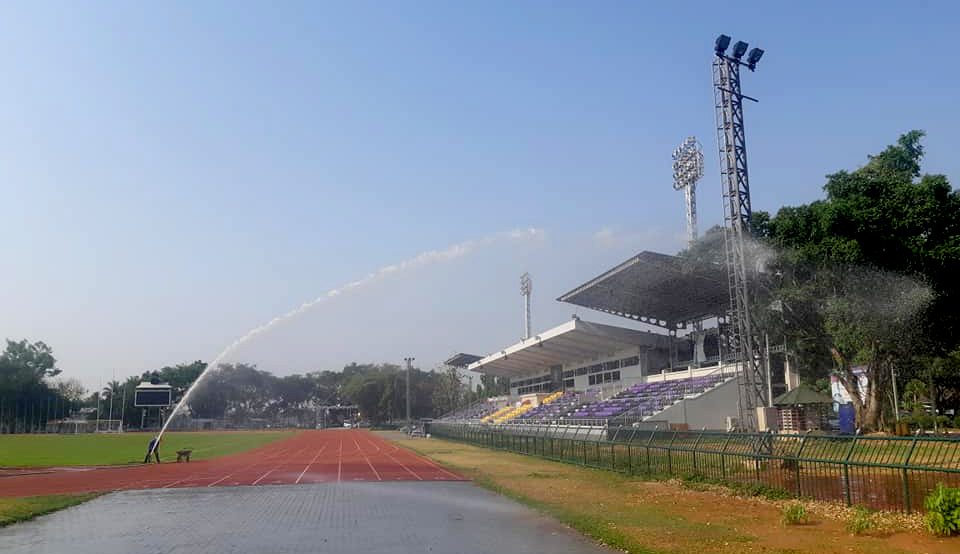
- Interactive map of Chiangrai Province Stadium
- Location: Chiang Rai, Thailand
- Coordinates: 19°54′48″N 99°51′19″E
- Capacity: 5,000
- Surface: Grass

Tenant
- Chiangrai City

Chiangrai Province Stadium or Chiangrai Provincial Administrative Organization Stadium (Thai: สนามกีฬากลาง จ.เชียงราย หรือ สนามกีฬา อบจ. เชียงราย) is a multi-purpose stadium in Chiang Rai Province, Thailand. It is currently used mostly for football matches and is the home stadium of Chiangrai City. The stadium holds 5,000 people.
