= 2019 Thai League Cup =

Toyota League Cup

Tournament details
- Country: Thailand
- Dates: 23 February 2019 – 28 September 2019
- Teams: 83

Final positions
- Champions: PT Prachuap (1st title)
- Runners-up: Buriram United

Tournament statistics
- Matches played: 81
- Goals scored: 251 (3.1 per match)
- Top goal scorer(s): Burnel Okana, Piyaphong Phrueksupee (4 goals)

Awards
- Best player: Nattapong Khajohnmalee

The 2019 Thai League Cup is the 10th season in the second era of a Thailand's knockout football competition. All games are played as a single match. It was sponsored by Toyota, and known as the Toyota League Cup (Thai: โตโยต้า ลีกคัพ) for sponsorship purposes. 83 clubs were accepted into the tournament, and it began with the first qualification round on 23 February 2019, and concluded with the final on 28 September 2019. The tournament has been readmitted back into Thai football after a 10-year absence. The prize money for this prestigious award is said to be around 5 million baht and the runners-up will be netting 1 million baht.

This is the first edition of the competition and the qualifying round will be played in regions featuring clubs from the Thai League 3 and Thai League 4.

PT Prachuap beat Buriram United after draw 1–1 on the extra time and won 8–7 on penalty shoot-out. It is the first ever penalty shoot-out in the final round of this tournament. This is first time champion for PT Prachuap.

== Calendar ==
Round	Date	Matches	Clubs	New entries this round
First qualification round	23–24 February 2019	21	19 + 23 → 21	19 2019 Thai League 3; 23 2019 Thai League 4
Second qualification round	23 February 2019 and 13 March 2019	14	21 + 2 + 5 → 14	2 2019 Thai League 3; 5 2019 Thai League 4
Qualification play-off round	24 April 2019	16	14 + 18 → 16	18 2019 Thai League 2
First round	15 May 2019	16	16 + 16 → 16	16 2019 Thai League 1
Second round	3 July 2019	8	16 → 8	
Quarter-finals	24 July 2019	4	8 → 4	
Semi-finals	14 August 2019	2	4 → 2	
Final	28 September 2019	1	2 → Champions	
Total				83 clubs

== Results ==
Note: T1: Clubs from Thai League 1; T2: Clubs from Thai League 2; T3: Clubs from Thai League 3; T4: Clubs from Thai League 4.

=== First qualification round ===
There were 19 clubs from 2019 Thai League 3 and 23 clubs from 2019 Thai League 4 have signed to first qualifying in 2019 Thai League cup. This round had drawn on 14 February 2019.

Northern region
The qualifying round would be played in northern region featuring 5 clubs from the 2019 Thai League 4 Northern Region and 3 clubs from the 2019 Thai League 3 Upper Region.

23 February 2019	Chiangrai City (T3)	2 – 1 (a.e.t.)	Wat Bot City (T4)	Chiangrai
15:30 (UTC+7)	Pitsanusak Cheunbua-in 82'; Piyarot Kwangkaew 105'	Report	Souleymane Camara 58'	Stadium: Mae Fah Luang University Stadium; Attendance: 60; Referee: Piyapong Thongkhain; Assistant referees: Wachirapan Prasomphon, Teerapong Martip; Fourth official: Supat Chaingam

23 February 2019	Kamphaengphet (T3)	1 – 0	Uttaradit (T4)	Kamphaengphet
15:30 (UTC+7)	Kawin Nuanthat 59'	Report		Stadium: Cha Kung Rao Stadium; Attendance: 220; Referee: Thanongsak Sutthi; Assistant referees: Datsakorn Hokla, Puwasak Sukkan; Fourth official: Tudsanee Khuanpet

23 February 2019	Phrae United (T3)	1 – 0	Phitsanulok (T4)	Phrae
18:00 (UTC+7)	Welington Adao Cruz 18'	Report		Stadium: Thunghong Municipality Stadium; Attendance: 395; Referee: Tanavit Prompet; Assistant referees: Uten Dansela, Sarawut Poltum; Fourth official: Woottipong Ketkam

Northeastern region
The qualifying round would be played in northeastern region featuring 4 clubs from the 2019 Thai League 4 Northeastern Region and 2 clubs from the 2019 Thai League 3 Upper Region.

23 February 2019	Huai Thalaeng United (T4)	3 – 4 (a.e.t.)	Khon Kaen Mordindang (T4)	Nakhon Ratchasima
15:30 (UTC+7)	Promphong Kransumrong 41'; Thanapong Jenvichuwong 45'; Nopparat Auraikae 49'	Report	Anansak Joraanan 36'; Thanapol Srithong 79'; Nontapat Pradapmook 90+2'; Patcharaphol Prutsakarn 118'	Stadium: Suranaree University of Technology Stadium; Attendance: 138; Referee: Chairat Phu-arlai; Assistant referees: Thanakorn Chaikanya, Prommin Jaturapong; Fourth official: Sittisak Phujaknil

23 February 2019	Surin Sugar Khong Chee Mool (T4)	0 – 2	Ubon Ratchathani (T3)	Surin
15:30 (UTC+7)		Report	Kanchit Senyasaen 62'; Jakre Burapha 89'	Stadium: Rajamangala University of Technology Isan Surin Campus Stadium; Attendance: 145; Referee: Somkhid Sarapim; Assistant referees: Pathompong Anunluksanakul, Yosakorn Pakdeesuwan; Fourth official: Winai Kunyapan

23 February 2019	Khon Kaen United (T3)	4 – 1	Kalasin (T4)	Khon Kaen
19:00 (UTC+7)	Nishihara Takumu 8', 21', 51'; Wuttisak Karnmueang 25' (o.g.)	Report	Apiwat Sodakot 43'	Stadium: Khon Kaen PAO. Stadium; Attendance: 2,864; Referee: Bodin Suriyakamun; Assistant referees: Chaisiri Wongkamjan, Suwida Wongkraisorn; Fourth official: Polson Seetao

Eastern region
The qualifying round would be played in eastern region featuring 4 clubs from the 2019 Thai League 4 Eastern Region and 2 clubs from the 2019 Thai League 3 Upper Region.

23 February 2019	Bankhai United (T4)	1 – 2	Chachoengsao Hi-Tek (T3)	Rayong
15:30 (UTC+7)	Tatree Seeha 24'	Report	Pardit Chouesuk 49'; Manop Prabkaew 60'	Stadium: Wai Krong Stadium; Attendance: 62; Referee: Satchukorn Saenchu; Assistant referees: Prachya Lertwanichcha, Atachai Kongkaew; Fourth official: Somsuk Poosomnuek

23 February 2019	Pluakdaeng United (T4)	1 – 0	Saimit Kabin United (T4)	Rayong
15:30 (UTC+7)	Caíque Ribeiro 44' (pen.)	Report		Stadium: CK Stadium; Attendance: 315; Referee: Suchat Fangmala; Assistant referees: Kampon Kaewsa-ad, Muangmol Wannapakdee; Fourth official: Sarawut Pramottayakul

24 February 2019	Royal Thai Fleet (T4)	2 – 1	Marines Eureka (T3)	Chonburi
18:00 (UTC+7)	Wuttigral Umprakhon 10'; Wutthichai Asucheewa 78'	Report	Sarayut Kiewpear 50'	Stadium: Sattahip Navy Stadium; Attendance: 980; Referee: Thawatchai Sangsanit; Assistant referees: Pakorn Srichumsin, Anuchit Panamathong; Fourth official: Pongthep Raipimai

Western region
The qualifying round would be played in western region featuring 3 clubs from the 2019 Thai League 4 Western Region, 2 clubs from 2019 Thai League 3 Upper Region, and 1 club from the 2019 Thai League 3 Lower Region.

23 February 2019	Samut Songkhram (T4)	4 – 2 (a.e.t.)	Chainat United (T4)	Samut Songkhram
15:30 (UTC+7)	Jiraphong Chaiyasaeng 66', 70'; Napatsakorn Chakkrathok 110'; Pongsaton Meesa 115'	Report	Thanongsak Promdad 56'; Natthapon Khongsanoon 60'	Stadium: Samut Songkhram PAO. Stadium; Attendance: 110; Referee: Kittipong Choolert; Assistant referees: Surasak Noikamsin, Krakrit Tankad; Fourth official: Tossapornsilp Sittisena

23 February 2019	Hua Hin City (T4)	1 – 2	Simork (T3)	Prachuap Khiri Khan
17:30 (UTC+7)	Songran Pungnoy 62'	Report	Netiphong Nakchim 11'; Chainarong Tathong 82'	Stadium: Khao Takiap Stadium; Attendance: 255; Referee: Yuttana Sadkrathok; Assistant referees: Komgrit Ponpasit, Keattipong Sukperm; Fourth official: Thanapong Chunhakam

23 February 2019	Nakhon Pathom United (T3)	3 – 0	Muangkan United (T3)	Nakhon Pathom
18:00 (UTC+7)	Ekkapoom Potharungroj 9'; Diego Oliveira Silva 82'; Phoutthasay Khochalern 88'	Report		Stadium: Nakhon Pathom Municipality Sport School Stadium; Attendance: 915; Referee: Apidech Wongsa; Assistant referees: Chawanat Chalachai, Kittiwat Kittpaksakun; Fourth official: Suriyo Kanhachalee

Bangkok metropolitan region
The qualifying round would be played in Bangkok metropolitan region featuring 2 clubs from the 2019 Thai League 4 Bangkok Metropolitan Region, 1 club from 2019 Thai League 3 Upper Region, and 3 clubs from the 2019 Thai League 3 Lower Region.

23 February 2019	Grakcu Sai Mai United (T4)	2 – 2 (a.e.t.) (5 – 4 p)	BTU United (T3)	Bangkok
15:30 (UTC+7)	Rachan Kanjina 33'; Basam Mohamed 74' (pen.)	Report	Woraphot Somsang 7'; Cho Dong-gyu 58' (pen.)	Stadium: Grakcu United Stadium; Attendance: 300; Referee: Thapakorn Thongkon; Assistant referees: Kittipong Nangwong, Adisai Pongnairat; Fourth official: Narinnart Tiamskun
	Penalties
	Wicha Maemkhuntod (penalty scored); Sivadon Kongsiri (penalty scored); Polpong Pongsuwan (penalty scored); Jirawat Boonmak (penalty scored); Watcharin Sombatwattanakul (penalty scored)		(penalty missed) Cho Dong-gyu; (penalty scored) Theerapat Leksameearunothai; (penalty scored) Natthapol Sreangaim; (penalty scored) Anucha Suksri; (penalty scored) Nattawut Namthip

23 February 2019	Bangkok (T3)	1 – 0 (a.e.t.)	North Bangkok University (T3)	Pathum Thani
15:30 (UTC+7)	Badar Al Alawi 113'	Report		Stadium: North Bangkok University Stadium (Rangsit); Attendance: 281; Referee: Patiyut Monthianart; Assistant referees: Chaiyos Sripak, Jagkrit Kaenkaew; Fourth official: Thinakorn Daensamsuan

23 February 2019	Thonburi University (T4)	2 – 1	Rajpracha (T3)	Bangkok
15:30 (UTC+7)	Werasak Anearasai 50'; Wutichai Rupsung 84' (pen.)	Report	Rewat Meerian 72'	Stadium: Thonburi University Stadium; Attendance: 600; Referee: Veeraporn Maophaeo; Assistant referees: Burin Kaenjan, Dusit Petnoi; Fourth official: U-sen Yala

Southern region
The qualifying round would be played in southern region featuring 7 clubs from the 2019 Thai League 4 Southern Region and 5 clubs from the 2019 Thai League 3 Lower Region.

23 February 2019	Muangkhon WU (T4)	2 – 3	Ranong United (T3)	Nakhon Si Thammarat
15:30 (UTC+7)	Suwasin Prathummet 43'; Pattarapol Molito 90+4'	Report	Tomohiro Onodera 48', 74'; Jakkit Palapon 70'	Stadium: Walailak University Stadium; Attendance: 400; Referee: Santi Senbit; Assistant referees: Pitsanu Chusri, Pongsiri Chusri; Fourth official: Arthit Srinoi

23 February 2019	Phuket City (T3)	5 – 0	Pattani (T4)	Phuket
15:30 (UTC+7)	Hwang In-seong 16', 55'; Anuwat Nakkasem 34'; Efe Obode 43', 45+4'	Report		Stadium: Surakul Stadium; Attendance: 572; Referee: Apirat Kreeso; Assistant referees: Arbus Ngajeh, Pornchai Anupan; Fourth official: Surachai Tosan

23 February 2019	Surat Thani (T3)	1 – 2	Trang (T3)	Surat Thani
15:30 (UTC+7)	Panupan Jumphala 41'	Report	Anusak Laosangthai 50', 81'	Stadium: Surat Thani Provincial Stadium; Attendance: 119; Referee: Apichit Penjamras; Assistant referees: Farid Buanak, Montree Sudma; Fourth official: Vorawit Promsangkaha

23 February 2019	Hatyai City (T4)	1 – 1 (a.e.t.) (5 – 4 p)	Nakhon Si United (T3)	Songkhla
15:30 (UTC+7)	Parus Thummagorn 57'	Report	Park Seon-hong 40'	Stadium: Southern Major City Stadium; Attendance: 320; Referee: Mayara Day; Assistant referees: Mayuno Kuetae, Pitsanusak Sriyo; Fourth official: Masuelan Makatung
	Penalties
	Nattathorn Phetmanee (penalty scored); Chairat Madsiri (penalty missed); Nuttakorn Khunjarern (penalty scored); Kittipong Rongrak (penalty scored); Sarawut Aksornthong (penalty scored); Kiblee Laalee (penalty scored)		(penalty scored) Wathanyou Promsophar; (penalty scored) Teeranan Srirat; (penalty scored) Aekkaphon Fangnongdu; (penalty missed) Niras Bu-nga; (penalty scored) Jimmy Shola; (penalty missed) Pongsakorn Klinsaowakon

23 February 2019	Surat Thani City (T4)	2 – 1 (a.e.t.)	Satun United (T4)	Surat Thani
15:30 (UTC+7)	Suttipong Yatfai 52'; Pedro Augusto Silva Rodrigues 109'	Report	Caio Rodrigues da Cruz 88'	Stadium: Ban Song Municipality Stadium; Attendance: 280; Referee: Sombat Suwannarat; Assistant referees: Kittitat Pruksaklammas, Chonsorn Nurach; Fourth official: Assanai Phetchui

23 February 2019	Phatthalung (T4)	3 – 1	Jalor City (T4)	Phatthalung
18:00 (UTC+7)	Trongpol Tongthong 19'; Isrufun Doromae 80'; Kritsada Kemden 90+1'	Report	Abdulbasit Salaeh 57'	Stadium: Phatthalung Provincial Stadium; Attendance: 500; Referee: Yod Damhai; Assistant referees: Abdulroheem Seeteeloh, Kotchakorn Chumjai; Fourth official: Nirut Suetrong

=== Second qualification round ===
The second qualifying round would be featured by 21 clubs which were the winners of first qualification round and the new entries including 2 clubs from 2019 Thai League 3 and 5 clubs from 2019 Thai League 4.

Northern region
The second qualifying round would be played in northern region featured by 3 clubs which were the winners of first qualification round, 2 clubs from the 2019 Thai League 4 Northern Region, and 1 club from the 2019 Thai League 3 Upper Region.

23 February 2019	Nakhon Mae Sot United (T4)	0 – 1	Singburi Bangrajun (T4)	Tak
18:00 (UTC+7)		Report	Phakphum Phonjaroen 45+1'	Stadium: Somdet Phra Naresuan Maharat Stadium; Attendance: 311; Referee: Suchin Kiawsopa; Assistant referees: Opas Aomsomsuay, Thanet Jaithai; Fourth official: Panupol Meengkleen

13 March 2019	Kamphaengphet (T3)	0 – 1	Lamphun Warrior (T3)	Kamphaengphet
15:30 (UTC+7)		Report	Saydou Maiga 57'	Stadium: Cha Kung Rao Stadium; Attendance: 250; Referee: Direk Ka-ard; Assistant referees: Piyapong Thongkhain, Tanavit Prompet; Fourth official: Thanongsak Sutthi

13 March 2019	Phrae United (T3)	1 – 0	Chiangrai City (T3)	Phrae
15:30 (UTC+7)	Adisorn Noonart 90+1'	Report		Stadium: Thunghong Municipality Stadium; Attendance: 298; Referee: Wachirapan Prasomphon; Assistant referees: Teerapong Martip, Songrit Trakulchai; Fourth official: Attapon Bolen

Northeastern region
The second qualifying round would be played in northeastern region featured by 3 clubs which were the winners of first qualification round and 1 club from the 2019 Thai League 4 Northeastern Region.

13 March 2019	Khon Kaen Mordindang (T4)	1 – 4	Muang Loei United (T4)	Khon Kaen
18:00 (UTC+7)	Chirawat Charoennon 68'	Report	Witthaya Thanawatcharasanti 21'; Amporn Chaipong 54'; Piya Kruawan 65'; Chawin Thirawatsri 70'	Stadium: Khon Kaen University Stadium; Attendance: 312; Referee: Songkiat Jangjan; Assistant referees: Jatupon Suwandee, Premsak Rungrueng; Fourth official: Thanon Naowapan

13 March 2019	Khon Kaen United (T3)	2 – 2 (a.e.t.) (3 – 5 p)	Ubon Ratchathani (T3)	Khon Kaen
19:00 (UTC+7)	Noppawit Obma 53'; Arthit Sunthornpit 90+2'	Report	Jakre Burapha 50'; Uthai Phiwngoen 78'	Stadium: Khon Kaen PAO. Stadium; Attendance: 2,936; Referee: Nipon Kaewchanthi; Assistant referees: Pathompong Anunluksanakul, Kittiwat Kittpaksakun; Fourth official: Passaraporn Manimud
	Penalties
	Tongchai Ponang (penalty missed); Arthit Sunthornpit (penalty scored); Jakkrawut Songma (penalty scored); Charin Boodhad (penalty scored)		(penalty scored) Panuwat Matkhaw; (penalty scored) Jakre Burapha; (penalty scored) Kanchit Senyasaen; (penalty scored) Karim Essam Fathy Hassan; (penalty scored) Manaschai Faktae

Eastern region
The second qualifying round would be played in eastern region featured by 3 clubs which were the winners of first qualification round and 1 club from the 2019 Thai League 4 Eastern Region.

13 March 2019	Royal Thai Fleet (T4)	0 – 1 (a.e.t.)	Pluakdaeng United (T4)	Chonburi
18:00 (UTC+7)		Report	Lucas Sérgio Lopes Reis 109'	Stadium: Sattahip Navy Stadium; Attendance: 125; Referee: Sarawut Pramottayakul; Assistant referees: Pongsaton Wisitsri, Ponchanarusorn Sorajjapinyo; Fourth official: Ekkalak Muangkot

13 March 2019	Chachoengsao Hi-Tek (T3)	1 – 0 (a.e.t.)	Kohkwang (T4)	Chachoengsao
18:30 (UTC+7)	Padungsak Phothinak 112'	Report		Stadium: Chachoengsao Municipality Stadium; Attendance: 390; Referee: Pongthep Raipimai; Assistant referees: Wararit Suwanjira, Anuchit Panamathong; Fourth official: Thawatchai Sangsanit

Western region
The second qualifying round would be played in western region featured by 3 clubs which were the winners of first qualification round and 1 club from the 2019 Thai League 3 Upper Region.

13 March 2019	Simork (T3)	1 – 0	Angthong (T3)	Suphanburi
15:30 (UTC+7)	Supawit Rompopak 90'	Report		Stadium: Suphanburi Sports School Stadium; Attendance: 145; Referee: Satchukorn. Saenchu; Assistant referees: Nasri Tamat, Samrit Ritkaew; Fourth official: Narong Chaitong

13 March 2019	Nakhon Pathom United (T3)	4 – 0	Samut Songkhram (T4)	Nakhon Pathom
19:00 (UTC+7)	Saeid Chahjouei 7'; Diego Oliveira Silva 77'; Jhonatan Bernardo 87'; Prayad Boonya 89'	Report		Stadium: Nakhon Pathom Municipality Sport School Stadium; Attendance: 1,117; Referee: Patiyut Monthianart; Assistant referees: Chaisiri Wongkamjan, Jagkrit Kaenkaew; Fourth official: Komgrit Ponpasit

Bangkok metropolitan region
The second qualifying round would be played in Bangkok metropolitan region featured by 3 clubs which were the winners of first qualification round and 1 club from the 2019 Thai League 4 Bangkok Metropolitan Region.

13 March 2019	Thonburi University (T4)	3 – 0	Samut Prakan (T4)	Bangkok
15:30 (UTC+7)	Sumetee Sae-song 31'; Piyaphong Phrueksupee 36', 67'	Report		Stadium: Thonburi University Stadium; Attendance: 170; Referee: Worakit Panyoo; Assistant referees: Jomthong Vaewvab, Pawara Srijan; Fourth official: Winai Riangwong

13 March 2019	Grakcu Sai Mai United (T4)	1 – 1 (a.e.t.) (7 – 6 p)	Bangkok (T3)	Bangkok
15:30 (UTC+7)	Nipat Ruaysanthia 90'	Report	Teerayut Suecharoen 60'	Stadium: Grakcu United Stadium; Attendance: 100; Referee: Warakorn Suraporn; Assistant referees: Pakorn Srichumsin, Narinnart Tiamskun; Fourth official: Somkhid Sarapim
	Penalties
	Rachan Kanjina (penalty scored); Anucha Thakapol (penalty scored); Nipat Ruaysanthia (penalty scored); Watcharin Sombatwattanakul (penalty scored); Anuchat Yossakrai (penalty scored); Wicha Maemkhuntod (penalty scored); Polpong Pongsuwan (penalty missed); Kantapong Poopunsri (penalty scored)		(penalty scored) Chaowasit Sapysakunphon; (penalty scored) Narin Channarong; (penalty scored) Chaimongkol Botnok; (penalty scored) Ibrahim Abou Dicko; (penalty scored) Wuttisak Maneesuk; (penalty scored) Selwan Al Jaberi; (penalty missed) Kissakorn Krasaingoen; (penalty missed) Kittipan Jaingam

Southern region
The second qualifying round would be played in southern region featured by 6 clubs which were the winners of first qualification round.

13 March 2019	Ranong United (T3)	2 – 1	Trang (T3)	Ranong
15:30 (UTC+7)	Burnel Okana 40' (pen.); Jakkit Palapon 90+3'	Report	Elvis Job 19'	Stadium: Ranong Provincial Stadium; Attendance: 250; Referee: Matoha Sayo; Assistant referees: Hasadin Noorid, Mongkhon Kaisin; Fourth official: Watcharin Nootong

13 March 2019	Surat Thani City (T4)	1 – 0	Phuket City (T3)	Surat Thani
15:30 (UTC+7)	Piyabut Srichaiwal 72'	Report		Stadium: Ban Song Municipality Stadium; Attendance: 60; Referee: Nirut Suetrong; Assistant referees: Kittitach Preuksaklammas, Dusaifee Awae; Fourth official: Surachai Tosan

13 March 2019	Hatyai City (T4)	1 – 2	Phatthalung (T4)	Songkhla
15:30 (UTC+7)	Niiffarn Patarathikul 45+2'	Report	Lim Do-hyun 10'; Malek Yawahab 58'	Stadium: Tinsulanon Stadium; Attendance: 500; Referee: Mayara Day; Assistant referees: Mayuno Kuetae, Abdulraheem Seeteeloh; Fourth official: Yod Damhai

=== Qualification play-off round ===
The qualification play-off round would be featured by 14 clubs which were the winners of second qualification round and the new entries including 18 clubs from 2019 Thai League 2. Follow the dissolving of Simork that make a club drawing against them would advanced to next round automatically. This round had drawn on 11 April 2019.

24 April 2019	Thonburi University (T4)	2 – 1	Thai Honda (T2)	Bangkok
15:30 (UTC+7)	Piyaphong Phrueksupee 90+1', 90+4'	Report	Natpasut Malison 3'	Stadium: Thonburi University Stadium; Attendance: 200; Referee: Ekkachai Phetcham; Assistant referees: Sahatnet Deemongkol, Anupong Sangtopo; Fourth official: Manop Pansakorn

24 April 2019	Ranong United (T3)	1 – 0	Ubon United (T2)	Ranong
15:30 (UTC+7)	Burnel Okana 40'	Report		Stadium: Ranong Provincial Stadium; Attendance: 300; Referee: Noppadet Mangngam; Assistant referees: Tanate Chuchuen, Rawut Nakarit; Fourth official: Paisan Bendem-alee

24 April 2019	Pluakdaeng United (T4)	0 – 3	Lampang (T2)	Rayong
15:30 (UTC+7)		Report	Nattapoom Maya 13'; Masaya Jitozono 16'; Melvin de Leeuw 90+2'	Stadium: CK Stadium; Attendance: 240; Referee: Atiwat Seelalo; Assistant referees: Kriangsak Pimsanit, Watcharasak Intharak; Fourth official: Kotchapoom Meesridaecha

24 April 2019	Ubon Ratchathani (T3)	1 – 3	Khon Kaen (T2)	Ubon Ratchathani
15:30 (UTC+7)	Kanchit Senyasaen 67'	Report	Thales Cruz 5'; Yuttana Ruangsuksut 29'; Cristian Alex 70'	Stadium: Ubon Rachathani Sports School Stadium; Attendance: 380; Referee: Sahapop Sriboonlue; Assistant referees: Chaiya Moolmanee, Vitsawa Nanchana; Fourth official: Apidech Wongsa

24 April 2019	Surat Thani City (T4)	2 – 1 (a.e.t.)	Air Force United (T2)	Surat Thani
15:30 (UTC+7)	Oumar Sanou 52' (pen.), 119'	Report	Siripong Khongjaowpa 89'	Stadium: Ban Song Municipality Stadium; Attendance: 320; Referee: Anusorn Nookaew; Assistant referees: Kanchit Nittayachart, Verayut Kunkure; Fourth official: Sunya Satiddumrongkul

24 April 2019	Muang Loei United (T4)	2 – 1	Udon Thani (T2)	Loei
15:30 (UTC+7)	Piya Kruawan 49'; Witthaya Thanawatcharasanti 90+2'	Report	Isariya Marom 52'	Stadium: Wang Saphung Stadium; Attendance: 500; Referee: Jirawit Phonkaew; Assistant referees: Pramote Boon-in, Narong Hansuk; Fourth official: Peerasan Krataithong

24 April 2019	Grakcu Sai Mai United (T4)	0 – 2	JL Chiangmai United (T2)	Bangkok
15:30 (UTC+7)		Report	Soares 48', 90+2'	Stadium: Grakcu United Stadium; Attendance: 100; Referee: Seksan Phansri; Assistant referees: Jareon Nunboon, Permsak Saisuwan; Fourth official: Wittaya Junejan

24 April 2019	Phatthalung (T4)	2 – 3 (a.e.t.)	MOF Customs United (T2)	Phatthalung
18:00 (UTC+7)	Malek Yawahab 45'; Teerawat Durnee 83'	Report	Uroš Stojanov 1'; Goshi Okubo 14' (pen.); Nattakit Fongwitoo 120'	Stadium: Phatthalung PAO. Stadium; Attendance: 230; Referee: Chaiwat Boonsong; Assistant referees: Binla Preeda, Suriya Lee-intr; Fourth official: Peeratat Kittikanmetee

24 April 2019	Singburi Bangrajun (T4)	2 – 5 (a.e.t.)	Ayutthaya United (T2)	Singburi
18:00 (UTC+7)	Aphisit Khamkkongaeo 45+3'; Anar Babayev 61'	Report	Santirad Weing-in 35'; Arnon Buspha 52', 97', 117'; Neto Santos 110'	Stadium: Singburi Provincial Stadium; Attendance: 300; Referee: Wichate Tainthong; Assistant referees: Sarayut Sriampri, Nuannid Donjangreed; Fourth official: Viritpol Pleumsilp

24 April 2019	Phrae United (T3)	3 – 3 (a.e.t.) (10 – 9 p)	Kasetsart (T2)	Phrae
18:00 (UTC+7)	Welington Adao Cruz 47'; Jung Jung-yu 54', 90'	Report	Jung Jung-yu 42' (o.g.); Márcio Marques 67'; Boubacar Koné 82'	Stadium: Thunghong Municipality Stadium; Attendance: 318; Referee: Natee Choosuwan; Assistant referees: Apichat Prasasak, Srisuwan Boonnum; Fourth official: Teetichai Nualjan
	Penalties
	Adisorn Sappaso (penalty scored); Kauê Rodrigues de Araujo (penalty scored); Jung Jung-yu (penalty missed); Adisorn Noonart (penalty scored); Wattanaporn Donmngkan (penalty scored); Phakhawat Poonachang (penalty scored); Artit Phiraban (penalty scored); Rattapon Auttawong (penalty scored); Poowapat Netthip (penalty scored); Elivelton de Araujo Rego (penalty missed); Nantapol Supathai (penalty scored); Adisorn Sappaso (penalty scored)		(penalty scored) Tanaset Jintapaputanasiri; (penalty missed) Komkrit Cumsokcheak; (penalty scored) Nopphakhun Kongmuang; (penalty scored) Boubacar Koné; (penalty scored) Farid Madsoh; (penalty scored) Tanatip Payuppreuk; (penalty scored) Ittipon Kampliw; (penalty scored) Teerachai Thampian; (penalty scored) Nutchanon Jochaworu; (penalty missed) Maouseng Salaeh; (penalty scored) Chuthayut Klatalumbon; (penalty missed) Tanaset Jintapaputanasiri

24 April 2019	Samut Sakhon (T2)	0 – 1	Sisaket (T2)	Samut Sakhon
18:00 (UTC+7)		Report	Chatta Kokkaew 53'	Stadium: Samut Sakhon Provincial Stadium; Attendance: 915; Referee: Winat Phophat; Assistant referees: Hanyot Buangrab, Phariwat Phoyoo; Fourth official: Vitsavet Sangnakorn

24 April 2019	Lamphun Warrior (T3)	1 – 3	Police Tero (T2)	Lamphun
18:00 (UTC+7)	Boonkerd Chaiyasin 86'	Report	Isaac Honny 10', 63'; Narong Jansawek 56'	Stadium: Lamphun PAO. Stadium; Attendance: 790; Referee: Chaireag Ngam-som; Assistant referees: Worapong Prasartsri, Tanin Reunjit; Fourth official: Kriangsak Keattisongkram

24 April 2019	Chachoengsao Hi-Tek (T3)	3 – 5 (a.e.t.)	Rayong (T2)	Chachoengsao
18:30 (UTC+7)	Sarawut Choenchai 19', 44'; Kanchai Tor.Wattanaphol 51'	Report	Chokdee Prabkaew 34' (o.g.); Chokrangsan Sawangsab 90'; Anuchit Ngoenbokkhol 90+3'; Patiroop Sunjonlord 92' (o.g.); Yordrak Namuangrak 105'	Stadium: Chachoengsao Municipality Stadium; Attendance: 465; Referee: Warintron Sassadee; Assistant referees: Banpot Khunhong, Natthaphon Mala; Fourth official: Torphong Somsing

24 April 2019	Nakhon Pathom United (T3)	2 – 2 (a.e.t.) (11 – 12 p)	Nongbua Pitchaya (T2)	Nakhon Pathom
19:00 (UTC+7)	Ekkapoom Potharungroj 44'; Diego Oliveira Silva 48'	Report	Warayut Klomnak 33'; Christer Youssef 37'	Stadium: Nakhon Pathom Municipality Sport School Stadium; Referee: Niwat Insa-ard; Assistant referees: Thitibodi Rumnet, Siwat Chaithong; Fourth official: U-sen Yala
	Penalties
	Teerayut Ngamlamai (penalty scored); Phoutthasay Khochalern (penalty scored); Lesley Ablorh (penalty scored); Saeid Chahjouei (penalty scored); Diego Oliveira Silva (penalty scored); Raungchai Choothongchai (penalty scored); Nakul Pinthong (penalty scored); Pongsathon Tongchaum (penalty missed); Pitipol Prachayamongkol (penalty scored); Putthipong Pomlee (penalty scored); Teerayut Ngamlamai (penalty scored); Phoutthasay Khochalern (penalty scored); Lesley Ablorh (penalty missed)		(penalty scored) Siwapong Jarernsin; (penalty scored) Adisak Waenlor; (penalty scored) Christer Youssef; (penalty scored) Apisit Khuankwai; (penalty scored) Suchin Yen-arom; (penalty scored) Yod Chanthawong; (penalty scored) Anucha Suksai; (penalty missed) Sittisak Sangsuwan; (penalty scored) Warayut Klomnak; (penalty scored) Witthaya Moonwong; (penalty scored) Siwapong Jarernsin; (penalty scored) Adisak Waenlor; (penalty scored) Christer Youssef

24 April 2019	BG Pathum United (T2)	4 – 1 (a.e.t.)	Army United (T2)	Pathum Thani
19:00 (UTC+7)	Chaowat Veerachat 20'; Chatree Chimtalay 105+2'; Irfan Fandi 111'; Rômulo 118'	Report	Rennan Gonçalves de Oliveira 55' (pen.)	Stadium: Leo Stadium; Attendance: 3,181; Referee: Boonsong Prachumrak; Assistant referees: Nissan Janthep, Pongsira Phuangket; Fourth official: Anupong Duangsri

Simork (T3)	awd.	Navy (T2)

=== First round ===
The first round would be featured by 16 clubs which were the winners of the qualification play-off round and the new entries including 16 clubs from 2019 Thai League 1. This round had drawn on 7 May 2019.

15 May 2019	Surat Thani City (T4)	3 – 1 (a.e.t.)	Trat (T1)	Surat Thani
15:30 (UTC+7)	Oumar Sanou 74'; Suttipong Yatfai 97'; Atitthan Kongsarp 115'	Report	Adefolarin Durosinmi 1'	Stadium: Ban Song Municipality Stadium; Attendance: 200; Referee: Atiwat Seelalo; Assistant referees: Watcharasak Intharak, Pongsira Phuangket; Fourth official: Paisan Bendem-alee

15 May 2019	Muang Loei United (T4)	2 – 1 (a.e.t.)	Suphanburi (T1)	Loei
15:30 (UTC+7)	Jessada Pannoi 68'; Jaroeysak Phengwicha 119'	Report	Santitorn Lattirom 74'	Stadium: Wang Saphung Stadium; Attendance: 854; Referee: Wittaya Khamuatsap; Assistant referees: Suriya Lee-intr, Vitsawa Nanchana; Fourth official: Pongthep Raipimai

15 May 2019	Thonburi University (T4)	1 – 1 (a.e.t.) (3 – 2 p)	Samut Prakan City (T1)	Bangkok
15:30 (UTC+7)	Nanthawat Suyoy 45'	Report	Ibson Melo 85'	Stadium: Thonburi University Stadium; Attendance: 700; Referee: Wichate Tainthong; Assistant referees: Poonsawat Samransuk, Dumrongchai Chuangaroen; Fourth official: Dusit Aiamsakun
	Penalties
	Pongsathorn Klombanjong (penalty scored); Kritchanan Narach (penalty scored); Tawit Boonperm (penalty missed); Joseph Louis Kissi (penalty missed); Chatturong Longsriphum (penalty missed); Panupong Harnsuri (penalty missed); Sumetee Sae-song (penalty missed); Kampanat Aiamsri (penalty scored)		(penalty missed) Picha Autra; (penalty scored) Baworn Tapla; (penalty missed) Ibson Melo; (penalty missed) Jakkapan Praisuwan; (penalty scored) Jaroensak Wonggorn; (penalty missed) Krailas Panyaroj; (penalty missed) Anurak Chompoopruk; (penalty missed) Nopparat Sakun-ood

15 May 2019	Ranong United (T3)	1 – 0	PTT Rayong (T1)	Ranong
15:30 (UTC+7)	Burnel Okana 29'	Report		Stadium: Ranong Provincial Stadium; Attendance: 560; Referee: Noppadet Mangngam; Assistant referees: Narin Wongprapipak, Sila Jinnigorn; Fourth official: Jirawit Phonkaew

15 May 2019	Nongbua Pitchaya (T2)	3 – 2	Port (T1)	Nongbua Lamphu
18:00 (UTC+7)	Anucha Suksai 25'; Warayut Klomnak 36'; Yod Chanthawong 52'	Report	Jirattikarn Vapilai 14'; Bordin Phala 90'	Stadium: Nongbua Lamphu Provincial Stadium; Attendance: 2,090; Referee: Vitsavet Sangnakorn; Assistant referees: Worapong Prasartsri, Natthaphon Mala; Fourth official: Pongpat Kaewbowon

15 May 2019	Khon Kaen (T2)	0 – 4	Chiangrai United (T1)	Khon Kaen
18:00 (UTC+7)		Report	Tanasak Srisai 9'; Sarawut Inpaen 38'; Bill 54'; Kritsana Kasemkulvilai 84'	Stadium: Khon Kaen PAO. Stadium; Attendance: 3,170; Referee: Chaireag Ngam-som; Assistant referees: Komsan Kampan, Watthana Chonchanakul; Fourth official: Anupong Duangsri

15 May 2019	Sisaket (T2)	1 – 3	Bangkok United (T1)	Sisaket
18:00 (UTC+7)	Marc Landry Babo 47'	Report; Highlight	Everton 44'; Alexander Sieghart 68'; Teeratep Winothai 78'	Stadium: Sri Nakhon Lamduan Stadium; Attendance: 1,535; Referee: Panumas Phansamo; Assistant referees: Chotrawee Tongduang, Uten Boonkan; Fourth official: Narong Chaitong

15 May 2019	Phrae United (T3)	1 – 2 (a.e.t.)	Sukhothai (T1)	Phrae
18:00 (UTC+7)	Naruephon Poomimas 111'	Report	Iain Ramsay 101'; Petar Orlandić 109'	Stadium: Thunghong Municipality Stadium; Attendance: 350; Referee: Natee Choosuwan; Assistant referees: Phubes Lekpha, Banpot Khunhong; Fourth official: Chaiwat Boonsong

15 May 2019	Navy (T2)	0 – 2	PT Prachuap (T1)	Chonburi
18:00 (UTC+7)		Report	Supot Jodjam 6'; Amorn Thammanarm 72'	Stadium: Sattahip Navy Stadium; Attendance: 527; Referee: Wittaya Junejan; Assistant referees: Binla Preeda, Kasama Loyma; Fourth official: Patiyut Monthianart

15 May 2019	MOF Customs United (T2)	1 – 1 (a.e.t.) (4 – 3 p)	Nakhon Ratchasima Mazda (T1)	Samut Prakan
18:00 (UTC+7)	Dantrai Longjumenong 108'	Report	Leandro Assumpção 94'	Stadium: Lad Krabang 54 Stadium; Attendance: 800; Referee: Anusorn Nookaew; Assistant referees: Chaowalit Poonprasit, Kanchit Nittayachart; Fourth official: Krisda Luangyos
	Penalties
	Naoto Kidoku (penalty scored); Rattasak Wiang-in (penalty missed); Rattana Petch-Aporn (penalty scored); Sarawat Inpoung (penalty scored); Goshi Okubo (penalty scored)		(penalty scored) Attapong Nooprom; (penalty missed) Bernard Henry; (penalty scored) Mathee Taweekulkarn; (penalty scored) Yayar Kuneth; (penalty missed) Leandro Assumpção

15 May 2019	Lampang (T2)	2 – 3	Chainat Hornbill (T1)	Lampang
19:00 (UTC+7)	Melvin de Leeuw 8'; Slanyu Buaneam 89'	Report	Wutthikai Pathan 1'; Dennis Buschening 17'; Kittiphap Aupachakham 61'	Stadium: Lampang Provincial Stadium; Attendance: 768; Referee: Wiwat Jumpaoon; Assistant referees: Sumate Peasiri, Ruangsak Noophuak; Fourth official: Seksan Phansri

15 May 2019	BG Pathum United (T2)	3 – 0	Chiangmai (T1)	Pathum Thani
19:00 (UTC+7)	Chatree Chimtalay 8'; Barros Tardeli 35' (pen.); Irfan Fandi 75'	Report		Stadium: Leo Stadium; Attendance: 2,855; Referee: Winat Phophat; Assistant referees: Tuwae-yusoh Kuji, Narong Hansuk; Fourth official: Phairot Bunkamnoed

15 May 2019	Rayong (T2)	1 – 4 (a.e.t.)	Buriram United (T1)	Rayong
19:00 (UTC+7)	Thiago Santos 50'	Report	Wasusiwakit Phosririt 55' (o.g.); Supachok Sarachat 108'; Pedro Júnior 112', 117'	Stadium: Rayong Provincial Stadium; Attendance: 3,268; Referee: Akom Charoensuk; Assistant referees: Rachan Dawangpa, Wirot Lokham; Fourth official: Prasert Arjpukdee

15 May 2019	Police Tero (T2)	1 – 0	SCG Muangthong United (T1)	Bangkok
19:00 (UTC+7)	Josimar 86'	Report		Stadium: Boonyachinda Stadium; Attendance: 1,328; Referee: Suwat Wongsuwan; Assistant referees: Pattarapong Kijsathit, Poramin Yoopensuk; Fourth official: Satchukorn Saenchu

15 May 2019	Ayutthaya United (T2)	1 – 1 (a.e.t.) (5 – 6 p)	Ratchaburi Mitr Phol (T1)	Ayutthaya
19:00 (UTC+7)	Moreira 21' (pen.)	Report	Philip Roller 52' (pen.)	Stadium: Ayutthaya Provincial Stadium; Attendance: 660; Referee: Peeratat Kittikanmetee; Assistant referees: Vichet Getkaew, Teerapon Sunyapluem; Fourth official: U-sen Yala
	Penalties
	Neto Santos (penalty scored); Suttipong Saenkla (penalty missed); Santirad Weing-in (penalty scored); Arnon Buspha (penalty scored); Kittisak Boontha (penalty scored); Wuttiphan Pantalee (penalty scored); Jo Tae-keun (penalty missed)		(penalty missed) Yannick Boli; (penalty scored) Kritsananon Srisuwan; (penalty scored) Dirceu; (penalty scored) Steeven Langil; (penalty scored) Jirawat Thongsaengphrao; (penalty scored) Amin Nazari; (penalty scored) Philip Roller

15 May 2019	JL Chiangmai United (T2)	2 – 1	Chonburi (T1)	Chiangmai
20:00 (UTC+7)	Soares 24'; Erivelto 90'	Report	Saharat Sontisawat 9'	Stadium: 700th Anniversary Stadium; Attendance: 688; Referee: Teetichai Nualjan; Assistant referees: Tanin Reunjit, Phariwat Phoyoo; Fourth official: Peerasan Krataithong

=== Second round ===
The second round would be featured by 16 clubs which were the winners of the first round including 7 clubs from T1, 5 clubs from T2, 1 club from T3, and 3 clubs from T4. This round had drawn on 11 June 2019.

3 July 2019	Muang Loei United (T4)	1 – 2	Bangkok United (T1)	Loei
15:30 (UTC+7)	Witthaya Thanawatcharasanti 89'	Report; Highlight	Mike Havenaar 19'; Sanrawat Dechmitr 32'	Stadium: Wang Saphung Stadium; Attendance: 1,052; Referee: Pichit Na Suwan; Assistant referees: Waranyoo Chomgoson, Yossapon Tongprom; Fourth official: Seksan Phansri

3 July 2019	Surat Thani City (T4)	2 – 5	Chiangrai United (T1)	Surat Thani
15:30 (UTC+7)	Pedro Augusto Silva Rodrigues 8', 74' (pen.)	Report; Highlight	Kritsana Kasemkulvilai 12'; Somkid Chamnarnsilp 16'; Bill 37', 75'; William Henrique 90'	Stadium: Ban Song Municipality Stadium; Attendance: 1,300; Referee: Natee Choosuwan; Assistant referees: Permsak Saisuwan, Vitsawa Nanchana; Fourth official: Chaiwat Boonsong

3 July 2019	Thonburi University (T4)	1 – 3	PT Prachuap (T1)	Bangkok
15:30 (UTC+7)	Kritchanan Narach 22'	Report; Highlight	Supot Jodjam 6'; Sompob Nilwong 35'; Siroch Chatthong 63'	Stadium: Thonburi University Stadium; Attendance: 772; Referee: Suwat Wongsuwan; Assistant referees: Teerapon Sunyapluem, Chaiya Sripak; Fourth official: Wittaya Junejan

3 July 2019	JL Chiangmai United (T2)	1 – 2 (a.e.t.)	Buriram United (T1)	Chiangmai
18:00 (UTC+7)	Sirisuk Faidong 83'	Report; Highlight	Nacer Barazite 28'; Sasalak Haiprakhon 120'	Stadium: 700th Anniversary Stadium; Attendance: 3,648; Referee: Niwat Insa-ard; Assistant referees: Binla Preeda, Vichet Getkaew; Fourth official: Ekkachai Phetcham

3 July 2019	Ranong United (T3)	1 – 0	Sukhothai (T1)	Ranong
18:00 (UTC+7)	Narongrit Boonsuk 76' (o.g.)	Report; Highlight		Stadium: Ranong Provincial Stadium; Attendance: 1,200; Referee: Sivakorn Pu-udom; Assistant referees: Sumate Peasiri, Khomchalach Lekhawijit; Fourth official: Boonsong Prachumrak

3 July 2019	Nongbua Pitchaya (T2)	1 – 0 (a.e.t.)	Ratchaburi Mitr Phol (T1)	Nongbua Lamphu
18:00 (UTC+7)	Apisit Khamwang 94'	Report; Highlight		Stadium: Nongbua Lamphu Provincial Stadium; Attendance: 743; Referee: Teetichai Nualjan; Assistant referees: Wirot Lokham, Phariwat Phoyoo; Fourth official: Anupong Duangsri

3 July 2019	BG Pathum United (T2)	5 – 0	Chainat Hornbill (T1)	Pathum Thani
19:00 (UTC+7)	Barros Tardeli 10', 45+2'; Surachat Sareepim 65', 90+3'; Chaowat Veerachat 71'	Report; Highlight		Stadium: Leo Stadium; Attendance: 2,509; Referee: Phairot Bunkamnoed; Assistant referees: Natthaphon Mala, Sila Jinnigorn; Fourth official: Pathomphong Aiaocharoen

3 July 2019	Police Tero (T2)	2 – 1	MOF Customs United (T2)	Bangkok
19:00 (UTC+7)	Nattawut Munsuwan 6', 16'	Report; Highlight	Kayne Vincent 85'	Stadium: Boonyachinda Stadium; Attendance: 347; Referee: Anuwat Feemuechang; Assistant referees: Kanchit Nittayachart, Tussanai Sarobon; Fourth official: Peeratat Kittikanmetee

=== Quarter-finals ===
The quarter-finals round would be featured by 8 clubs which were the winners of the second round including 4 clubs from T1, 3 clubs from T2, and 1 club from T3. This round had drawn on 8 July 2019.

24 July 2019	PT Prachuap (T1)	2 – 1	Police Tero (T2)	Prachuap Khiri Khan
18:00 (UTC+7)	Siroch Chatthong 18'; Phuritad Jarikanon 64'	Report; Highlight	Simon Dia 33'	Stadium: Sam Ao Stadium; Attendance: 2,020; Referee: Natee Choosuwan; Assistant referees: Suriya Lee-intr, Banpot Khunhong; Fourth official: Pongpat Kaewbowon

24 July 2019	Ranong United (T3)	1 – 1 (a.e.t.) (1 – 4 p)	Nongbua Pitchaya (T2)	Ranong
18:00 (UTC+7)	Burnel Okana 41' (pen.)	Report; Highlight	Bladimir Díaz 35'	Stadium: Ranong Provincial Stadium; Attendance: 825; Referee: Dusit Aiamsakun; Assistant referees: Phariwat Phoyoo, Udon Aneksak; Fourth official: Ekkachai Phetcham
	Penalties
	Burnel Okana (penalty missed); Akkarin Pittaso (penalty missed); Armand Mefire Njikam (penalty scored)		(penalty scored) Apisit Khamwang; (penalty scored) Siwapong Jarernsin; (penalty scored) Ramon; (penalty scored) Yossawat Montha

24 July 2019	BG Pathum United (T2)	0 – 1	Chiangrai United (T1)	Pathum Thani
19:00 (UTC+7)		Report; Highlight	Ekanit Panya 37'	Stadium: Leo Stadium; Attendance: 3,752; Referee: Mongkolchai Pechsri; Assistant referees: Chaowalit Poonprasit, Sumate Peasiri; Fourth official: Krisda Luangyos

24 July 2019	Bangkok United (T1)	0 – 1 (a.e.t.)	Buriram United (T1)	Pathum Thani
19:00 (UTC+7)		Report; Highlight	Nacer Barazite 113'	Stadium: Thammasat Stadium; Attendance: 4,713; Referee: Vitsavet Sangnakorn; Assistant referees: Pattarapong Kijsathit, Tanin Reunjit; Fourth official: Teetichai Nualjan

=== Semi-finals ===
The semi-finals round would be featured by 4 clubs which were the winners of the quarter-finals round including 3 clubs from T1 and 1 club from T2. This round had drawn on 30 July 2019.

14 August 2019	Buriram United (T1)	2 – 0	Nongbua Pitchaya (T2)	Bangkok
19:00 (UTC+7)	Apiwat Ngaolamhin 14'; Korrakot Wiriyaudomsiri 48'	Report; Highlight		Stadium: 72nd Anniversary Stadium (Min Buri); Attendance: 1,860; Referee: Torphong Somsing; Assistant referees: Tanate Chuchuen, Poonsawat Samransuk; Fourth official: Phairot Bunkamnoed

14 August 2019	Chiangrai United (T1)	3 – 3 (a.e.t.) (3 – 4 p)	PT Prachuap (T1)	Bangkok
19:00 (UTC+7)	Brinner 37'; Sivakorn Tiatrakul 74'; Peerapong Pichitchotirat 105+4'	Report; Highlight	Sakunchai Saengthopho 12'; Maurinho 87'; Jean-Philippe Mendy 99'	Stadium: Boonyachinda Stadium; Attendance: 1,534; Referee: Niwat Insa-ard; Assistant referees: Suriya Lee-intr, Kitisak Pikunngoen; Fourth official: Sivakorn Pu-udom
	Penalties
	Bill (penalty scored); Sivakorn Tiatrakul (penalty scored); Phitiwat Sukjitthammakul (penalty scored); Peerapong Pichitchotirat (penalty missed); Somkid Chamnarnsilp (penalty missed)		(penalty scored) Phuritad Jarikanon; (penalty scored) Sompob Nilwong; (penalty scored) Jean-Philippe Mendy; (penalty missed) Artyom Filiposyan; (penalty scored) Maurinho

=== Final ===
The final round would be featured by 2 clubs which were the winners of the semi-finals round, both were clubs from T1. This round was played on 28 September 2019 at SCG Stadium in Pak Kret, Nonthaburi.

28 September 2019	Buriram United (T1)	1 – 1 (a.e.t.) (7 – 8 p)	PT Prachuap (T1)	Nonthaburi
19:00 (UTC+7)	Supachai Jaided 74'	Report; Highlight	Maurinho 47'	Stadium: SCG Stadium; Attendance: 11,218; Referee: Mongkolchai Pechsri; Assistant referees: Chotrawee Tongduang, Chaowalit Poonprasit; Fourth official: Sarayut Jakngoen
	Penalties
	Andrés Túñez (penalty scored); Ratthanakorn Maikami (penalty scored); Suphanat Mueanta (penalty missed); Supachai Jaided (penalty scored); Suchao Nuchnum (penalty scored); Siwarak Tedsungnoen (penalty scored); Sasalak Haiprakhon (penalty scored); Hajime Hosogai (penalty scored); Korrakot Wiriyaudomsiri (penalty missed)		(penalty missed) Sompob Nilwong; (penalty scored) Adul Muensamaan; (penalty scored) Ratchapol Nawanno; (penalty scored) Artyom Filiposyan; (penalty scored) Phuritad Jarikanon; (penalty scored) Weerawut Kayem; (penalty scored) Sakunchai Saengthopho; (penalty scored) Amorn Thammanarm; (penalty scored) Seeket Madputeh

== Top goalscorers ==
Rank	Player	Club	Goals
1	(Republic of the Congo) Burnel Okana	Ranong United	4
1	(Thailand) Piyaphong Phrueksupee	Thonburi University	4
3	(Thailand) Arnon Buspha	Ayutthaya United	3
3	(Brazil) Barros Tardeli	BG Pathum United	3
3	(Brazil) Bill	Chiangrai United	3
3	(Brazil) Soares	JL Chiangmai United	3
3	(Japan) Nishihara Takumu	Khon Kaen United	3
3	(Thailand) Witthaya Thanawatcharasanti	Muang Loei United	3
3	(Brazil) Diego Oliveira Silva	Nakhon Pathom United	3
3	(Ivory Coast) Oumar Sanou	Surat Thani City	3
3	(Brazil) Pedro Augusto Silva Rodrigues	Surat Thani City	3
