= 2019 Thai League 3 Upper Region =

Thai League 3
- Season: 2019
- Dates: 9 February 2019 – 8 September 2019
- Champions: Khon Kaen United
- Relegated: Marines Eureka
- Final: Khon Kaen United
- Third place play-off: Phrae United
- Matches: 156
- Goals: 403 (2.58 per match)
- Top goalscorer: (Brazil) Natan Oliveira (18 goals; Khon Kaen United)
- Biggest home win: 5 goals difference Bangkok 6–1 Ubon Ratchathani (2 June 2019)
- Biggest away win: 7 goals difference Sakaeo 0–7 Bangkok (11 May 2019)
- Highest scoring: 8 goals Angthong 6–2 Bangkok (13 July 2019)
- Longest winning run: 8 matches Phrae United
- Longest unbeaten run: 15 matches Khonkaen United
- Longest winless run: 13 matches Marines Eureka
- Longest losing run: 5 matches Marines Eureka
- Highest attendance: 5,384; Khonkaen United 2–0 Ayutthaya (8 September 2019)
- Lowest attendance: 22; Chiangrai City 1–1 Ayutthaya (10 August 2019)
- Total attendance: 111,498
- Average attendance: 697

2019 Thai League 3 Upper Region is the 3rd season of the Thai football league. It is a part of the Thai League 3 and the feeder league for the Thai League 2. A total of 14 teams will compete in the league this season.

== Changes from last season ==
=== Team changes ===
==== Promoted clubs ====
Three clubs were promoted from the 2018 Thai League 4

- Khonkaen United

Two clubs were promoted to the 2019 Thai League 2

- JL Chiangmai United
- Ayutthaya United

==== Relegated clubs ====
A club was relegated to the 2019 Thai League 4 Northeastern Region

- Kalasin

A club was relegated from the 2018 Thai League 2

- Angthong

=== Moved clubs ===
- Simork were moved from the Lower Region.

==== Withdrawn clubs ====
- Simork was suspended from the 2019 campaign after avoiding payment to athletes and team staff.

== Teams ==
=== Stadium and locations ===
Locations of the Thai League 3 Upper region in 2019
2019 Thai League 3 Upper Region
Football clubs in Bangkok Metropolitan Region

Team	Location	Stadium	Capacity
Angthong	Angthong	Ang Thong Province Stadium	6,000
Ayutthaya	Ayutthaya	Udhomseelwitthaya School Stadium	1,800
Bangkok	Nonthaburi	SCG Stadium	12,505
Chachoengsao	Chachoengsao	Chachoengsao Municipality Stadium	6,000
Chiangrai City	Chiang Rai	Chiangrai Province Stadium	5,000
Kamphaengphet	Kamphaengphet	Cha Kung Rao Stadium	2,406
Khonkaen United	Khon Kaen	Khonkaen PAO. Stadium	7,000
Lamphun Warrior	Lamphun	Mae-Guang Stadium	3,000
Marines Eureka	Chonburi	Sattahip Navy Stadium	6,000
Muangkan United	Kanchanaburi	Kleebbua Stadium	5,403
Phrae United	Phrae	Thunghong Municipality Stadium	4,500
Sakaeo	Sakaeo	Sakaeo PAO. Stadium	10,000
Simork	Suphanburi	Suphanburi Sports School Stadium	1,500
Ubon Ratchathani	Ubon Ratchathani	Ubon Ratchathani University Stadium	2,000

=== Foreign Players ===
Club	Player 1	Player 2	Player 3	Player 4	Player 5	Former
Angthong	(Brazil) Cláudio	(Brazil) Moacir	(Egypt) Osama Ibrahim	(Japan) Daiki Konomura	(Malaysia) Zafuan Azeman	(Brazil) Alaan Bruno de Sousa (Brazil) Rodrigo Oliveira Gonçalves
Ayutthaya	(Cameroon) Ousmanou Mohamadou	(Ghana) Emmanuel Kwame	(Iran) Ali Mohammadi	(South Korea) Kang Hyun	(Laos) Manolom Phomsouvanh	(Trinidad and Tobago) Kendall Jagdeosingh (Zambia) Noah Chivuta
Bangkok	(Ivory Coast) Ibrahim Dicko	(Egypt) Ali Hassan	(France) Mamadou Fofana	(Oman) Badar Al Alawi	(Philippines) Gilmàr	(Malaysia) Bryan See Tian Keat (Sweden) Selwan Al Jaberi
Chachoengsao	(Cameroon) Nyamsi Jacques	(France) Moise Gnenegbe	(Germany) Hans Miertschink			
Chiangrai City	(Brazil) Higor Da Silva	(Brazil) Lenny	(Brazil) Lucas Moraes			(Brazil) Victor Jatobá
Kamphaengphet	(Iran) Hossein Kazemi					(Brazil) Robert (Japan) Koki Narita (Japan) Ryusei Kojima
Khonkaen United	(Brazil) Douglas Cobo	(Brazil) Natan Oliveira	(Brazil) Conrado	(Japan) Takumu Nishihara		
Lamphun Warrior	(Guinea) Diabate Ibrahima	(Japan) Atsushi Izawa	(Trinidad and Tobago) Kendall Jagdeosingh	(Zambia) Noah Chivuta		(Guinea) Conde Mamoudou (Serbia) Milan Bubalo
Marines Eureka						
Muangkan United	(Brazil) Vinicius	(Ghana) Ozor Enoch				(Cameroon) Samuel Ngouafack
Phrae United	(Brazil) Elivélton	(Brazil) Kauê Araújo	(Brazil) Welington Smith	(South Korea) Jung Jung-yu		
Sakaeo	(Brazil) Leonardo Silvestre	(Cameroon) Jislin Sandjo	(Cameroon) Nguimbus Ferdinand	(Iran) Taghi Nayebi		(Brazil) Lucas Massaro (Japan) Naohiro Yoshida
Simork						(Japan) Kunie Kitamoto (Namibia) Sadney Urikhob
Ubon Ratchathani	(Brazil) Leo Carioca	(Cameroon) David Bayiha	(South Korea) Hwang In-seong	(South Korea) Song I-leum		(Egypt) Karim Hassan

== League table ==
Pos	Team	Pld	W	D	L	GF	GA	GD	Pts	Qualification or relegation
1	Khonkaen United (C, P)	24	18	5	1	57	19	+38	59	Qualification to final and promotion to 2020 Thai League 2
2	Phrae United (Q, P)	24	18	4	2	48	13	+35	58	Qualification to third place play-offs
3	Lamphun Warrior	24	13	6	5	39	23	+16	45	
4	Angthong	24	11	5	8	37	29	+8	38	
5	Bangkok	24	11	4	9	47	35	+12	37	
6	Chachoengsao	24	8	6	10	19	26	−7	30 (Note: Chachoengsao ahead on head-to-head record; Chachoengsao 4 pts, Ubon Ratchathani 1 pts.)	
7	Ubon Ratchathani	24	8	6	10	23	35	−12	30	
8	Kamphaengphet	24	7	5	12	21	33	−12	26	
9	Chiangrai City	24	6	6	12	33	44	−11	24	
10	Muangkan United	24	4	11	9	24	35	−11	23 (Note: Muangkan United ahead on head-to-head record; Muangkan United 3 pts, Sakaeo 3 pts.)	
11	Sakaeo	24	6	5	13	18	40	−22	23	
12	Ayutthaya	24	6	4	14	20	31	−11	22	
13	Marines Eureka (R)	24	4	5	15	17	40	−23	17	Relegation to the 2020 Thai League 4
14	Simork	0	0	0	0	0	0	0	0	

Updated to match(es) played on 8 September 2019. Source: Thai League 3
Rules for classification: 1) Points; 2) Head-to-head; 3) Goal difference; 4) Goals scored;).
(C) Champions; (P) Promoted; (Q) Qualified for the phase indicated; (R) Relegated

=== Positions by round ===
The table lists the positions of teams after each week of matches. In order to preserve chronological evolvements, any postponed matches are not included in the round at which they were originally scheduled, but added to the full round they were played immediately afterwards. For example, if a match is scheduled for matchday 11, but then postponed and played between days 12 and 13, it will be added to the standings for day 14.

Team ╲ Round	1	2	3	4	5	6	7	8	9	10	11	12	13	14	15	16	17	18	19	20	21	22	23	24	25	26
Khonkaen United	3	1	1	1	1	1	1	1	1	1	1	1	1	1	1	1	1	1	1	1	1	1	1	1	1	1
Phrae United	2	5	3	2	3	5	5	3	2	3	3	2	2	3	3	2	2	3	2	2	2	2	2	2	2	2
Lamphun Warrior	9	9	4	3	4	2	3	2	3	2	2	3	3	2	2	3	3	2	3	3	3	3	3	3	3	3
Angthong	5	2	5	11	9	10	6	8	9	8	8	9	8	6	6	5	5	5	4	4	4	5	5	4	4	4
Bangkok	12	7	11	6	7	9	8	6	7	5	7	5	4	4	4	4	4	4	5	5	5	4	4	5	5	5
Chachoengsao	1	6	9	7	5	3	4	5	6	7	6	7	7	9	9	9	11	11	9	10	8	6	6	6	6	6
Ubon Ratchathani	4	4	2	5	2	4	2	4	5	6	4	4	5	5	5	6	6	7	6	6	6	7	7	8	7	7
Kamphaengphet	6	3	7	8	11	11	12	11	11	12	12	12	10	10	10	10	8	9	11	9	10	10	11	11	10	8
Chiangrai City	11	10	6	10	10	7	9	7	4	4	5	6	6	7	7	7	7	6	7	7	7	8	8	7	8	9
Muangkan United	7	8	10	9	8	6	7	9	10	10	10	8	9	8	8	8	10	10	10	11	11	11	9	10	9	10
Sakaeo	8	11	8	4	6	8	10	10	8	9	9	10	11	11	11	11	9	8	8	8	9	9	10	9	11	11
Ayutthaya	10	12	12	12	12	12	13	13	13	13	13	13	13	13	13	12	12	12	12	12	12	12	12	12	12	12
Marines Eureka	13	13	13	13	13	13	11	12	12	11	11	11	12	12	12	13	13	13	13	13	13	13	13	13	13	13

Leader and promotion to the 2020 Thai League 2
Qualification for Thai League 3 Play-offs
Relegation to the 2020 Thai League 4

Source: Thai League 3

=== Results by match played ===
Team ╲ Round	1	2	3	4	5	6	7	8	9	10	11	12	13	14	15	16	17	18	19	20	21	22	23	24	25	26
Angthong	D	W	L	L	D	D	W	L	L	W	C	L	W	W	L	W	L	W	W	W	D	D	C	W	L	W
Ayutthaya	L	L	L	L	W	L	L	L	W	D	L	C	L	L	D	W	L	L	D	L	D	W	W	C	W	L
Bangkok	L	W	L	W	C	L	D	W	D	W	L	W	W	W	W	L	C	L	L	D	W	W	D	L	L	W
Chachoengsao	W	L	C	W	D	W	D	D	L	L	W	L	L	L	C	L	D	D	W	L	W	D	W	L	W	L
Chiangrai City	L	D	W	L	L	W	W	L	W	W	L	D	C	L	L	D	D	W	L	L	D	L	L	D	C	L
Kamphaengphet	D	W	L	C	L	L	L	W	D	L	L	L	W	W	D	C	W	L	L	W	L	L	L	L	D	W
Khonkaen United	W	W	W	D	D	W	W	D	W	C	W	W	W	W	W	W	L	W	D	W	D	C	W	W	W	W
Lamphun Warrior	C	D	W	W	D	W	L	W	L	W	W	L	W	W	W	D	W	W	D	W	L	D	W	L	D	C
Marines Eureka	L	L	L	L	W	C	W	L	D	D	D	L	L	L	L	L	D	C	D	L	L	W	L	W	L	L
Muangkan United	D	D	D	D	D	W	L	L	C	D	D	W	L	W	L	L	D	L	D	D	C	L	W	L	D	L
Phrae United	W	C	D	W	D	D	D	W	W	L	W	W	W	C	W	W	W	L	W	W	W	W	W	W	W	W
Sakaeo	D	L	W	W	L	L	C	L	W	L	L	D	L	L	D	W	W	W	C	L	D	L	L	D	L	L
Simork	C	C	C	C	C	C	C	C	C	C	C	C	C	C	C	C	C	C	C	C	C	C	C	C	C	C
Ubon Ratchathani	W	D	W	L	W	L	W	C	L	D	W	W	L	L	D	L	L	D	D	C	D	L	L	L	W	W

Source: Thai League 3
W = Win; D = Draw; L = Lose; C = Cancelled

== Results ==
Home \ Away	ANG	AYA	BKK	CCH	CRC	KPP	KKU	LPW	MRE	MKU	PRU	SAK	SIM	UBR
Angthong	—	3–1	6–2	0–0	4–3	2–1	1–3	1–1	3–1	3–1	1–0	0–1	—	2–0
Ayutthaya	2–1	—	0–1	1–0	2–1	3–0	0–1	0–1	1–2	2–1	0–2	0–1	—	0–1
Bangkok	3–0	2–0	—	1–0	2–1	2–2	2–3	2–2	2–0	2–2	1–1	1–0	—	6–1
Chachoengsao	0–1	2–1	2–0	—	1–0	0–2	1–1	2–0	1–0	1–1	0–1	1–0	—	2–0
Chiangrai City	2–0	1–1	2–1	5–1	—	3–1	1–5	1–1	1–2	0–0	2–1	2–2	—	2–3
Kamphaengphet	0–1	1–0	3–4	1–0	0–1	—	0–3	0–3	1–0	2–1	0–2	2–1	—	0–0
Khonkaen United	3–1	2–0	2–1	3–1	5–1	1–0	—	2–1	4–1	1–1	0–0	4–0	—	3–1
Lamphun Warrior	1–0	2–1	3–1	2–1	1–0	1–1	0–0	—	2–0	5–1	2–3	3–0	—	0–0
Marines Eureka	0–4	2–2	2–1	0–0	1–1	0–1	0–2	0–1	—	0–0	0–2	0–1	—	1–0
Muangkan United	1–1	1–1	1–3	1–1	3–1	1–1	1–2	3–1	2–1	—	0–0	0–1	—	0–0
Phrae United	1–1	3–0	1–0	4–0	4–0	2–1	2–0	3–1	3–2	3–0	—	4–1	—	2–0
Sakaeo	1–1	0–0	0–7	1–2	2–2	1–1	0–4	0–1	3–0	0–1	0–1	—	—	1–0
Simork	—	—	—	—	—	—	—	—	—	—	—	—	—	—
Ubon Ratchathani	1–0	0–2	1–0	0–0	1–0	1–0	3–3	1–4	2–2	3–1	1–3	3–1	—	—

Updated to match(es) played on 8 September 2019. Source: Thai League 3
Legend: Blue = home team win; Yellow = draw; Red = away team win.

== Season statistics ==
=== Top scorers ===
As of 8 September 2019.

Rank	Player	Club	Goals
1	(Brazil) Natan Oliveira	Khonkaen United	18
2	(Ivory Coast) Ibrahim Dicko	Bangkok	15
2	(Thailand) Ronnachai Pongputtha	Lamphun Warrior	15
4	(Brazil) Moacir Wilmsen	Angthong	9
4	(Sweden) Selwan Al Jaberi	Bangkok (5 Goals); Kasem Bundit University (4 Goals)	9
4	(Thailand) Arthit Peeraban	Phrae United	9
7	(Oman) Badar Al-Alawi	Bangkok	8
7	(Thailand) Bunlue Thongkliang	Bangkok	8
7	(Brazil) Conrado	Khonkaen United	8
7	(Thailand) Charin Boodhad	Khonkaen United	8
7	(South Korea) Jung Jung-yu	Phrae United	8

=== Hat-tricks ===
Player	For	Against	Result	Date
(Thailand) Phitchanon Chanlung	Chiangrai City	Chachoengsao	5–1	7 May 2019
(Ivory Coast) Ibrahim Dicko	Bangkok	Sakaeo	7–0	11 May 2019
(Brazil) Natan Oliveira^{4}	Khonkaen United	Chiangrai City	5–1	18 May 2019
(Brazil) Natan Oliveira	Khonkaen United	Marines Eureka	4–1	1 June 2019
(Brazil) Moacir Wilmsen	Angthong	Bangkok	6–2	13 July 2019
(Brazil) Moacir Wilmsen	Angthong	Chiangrai City	4–3	3 August 2019

== Attendance ==
=== Overall statistics ===
Pos	Team	Total	High	Low	Average	Change
1	Khonkaen United	52,733	5,384	3,685	4,394	+12.4%
2	Lamphun Warrior	9,942	1,340	497	829	+2.5%
3	Chachoengsao	7,953	1,385	341	663	−42.3%
4	Angthong	6,742	967	245	562	−39.4%
5	Phrae United	6,800	1,083	199	523	−1.3%
6	Simork	1,345	800	225	448	+112.3%
7	Sakaeo	4,605	700	200	384	+40.1%
8	Ubon Ratchathani	4,549	520	219	379	−18.5%
9	Bangkok	4,095	600	205	372	+20.4%
10	Marines Eureka	3,602	950	70	300	+53.8%
11	Muangkan United	3,352	543	136	279	+14.8%
12	Kamphaengphet	29,420	675	90	226	−11.0%
13	Ayutthaya	1,575	310	49	131	−49.6%
14	Chiangrai City	1,265	250	22	105	+26.5%
	League total	111,498	5,384	22	697	+54.5%

Updated to games played on 8 September 2019
Source: Thai League 3

=== Attendance by home match played ===
Date	Matches each team against Simork since 31 March 2019.

Since 31 March 2019 Simork had suspended. But statistics of attendances are continue counting.

Team \ Match played	1	2	3	4	5	6	7	8	9	10	11	12	13	Total
Angthong	669	967	759	412	476	19 May	614	535	524	586	521	434	245	6,742
Ayutthaya	207	250	69	54	100	150	89	90	49	87	120	25 Aug	310	1,575
Bangkok	372	600	415	205	353	220	356	353	20 Jul	356	428	Unk.1	437	4,095
Chachoengsao	950	624	641	1,385	476	617	415	6 Jul	596	341	492	487	929	7,953
Chiangrai City	105	100	52	100	48	85	168	1 Jun	174	120	22	41	250	1,265
Kamphaengphet	675	391	119	170	151	160	253	250	300	91	170	90	120	2,940
Khonkaen United	4,470	3,871	4,526	4,661	4,361	4,720	4,214	4,481	3,685	4,132	17 Aug	4,228	5,384	52,733
Lamphun Warrior	1,340	950	735	954	671	869	636	672	1,109	892	617	497	8 Sep	9,942
Marines Eureka	223	950	31 Mar	70	650	320	105	120	107	127	240	280	410	3,602
Muangkan United	404	291	209	503	150	136	290	543	274	155	11 Aug	161	236	3,352
Phrae United	309	278	199	235	378	402	336	827	530	820	596	807	1,083	6,800
Sakaeo	250	230	200	250	200	600	250	475	400	31 Jul	600	450	700	4,605
Simork	800	320	225	6 Apr	28 Apr	12 May	26 May	29 Jun	14 Jul	27 Jul	4 Aug	21 Aug	31 Aug	1,345
Ubon Ratchathani	500	500	350	520	20 Apr	375	219	450	390	240	440	280	285	4,549

Source: Thai League 3
Note:
Unk.1 Some error of T3 official match report 21 August 2019 (Bangkok 2–2 Lamphun Warrior).

== See also ==
- 2019 Thai League 1
- 2019 Thai League 2
- 2019 Thai League 3
- 2019 Thai League 4
- 2019 Thai FA Cup
- 2019 Thai League Cup
- 2019 Thai League 3 Lower Region
