= 2019 Thai League 2 =

Thai League 2
- Season: 2019
- Dates: 9 February 2019 – 27 October 2019
- Champions: BG Pathum United
- Promoted: BG Pathum United; Police Tero; Rayong
- Relegated: Navy; Ubon United; Ayutthaya United
- Matches: 306
- Goals: 847 (2.77 per match)
- Top goalscorer: Tiago Chulapa (19 goals)
- Biggest home win: 7 goals difference Police Tero 7–0 Rayong (27 October 2019)
- Biggest away win: 6 goals difference Ayutthaya United 0–6 Police Tero (23 February 2019)
- Highest scoring: 9 goals scored BG Pathum United 7–2 Rayong (17 February 2019)
- Longest winning run: 6 matches Army United; Rayong; Sisaket
- Longest unbeaten run: 16 matches Sisaket
- Longest winless run: 14 matches Air Force United
- Longest losing run: 5 matches Customs United; Ubon United
- Highest attendance: 10,892; Sisaket 0–0 BG Pathum United (19 October 2019)
- Lowest attendance: 162; Customs United 1–1 Samut Sakhon (16 March 2019)
- Total attendance: 484,252
- Average attendance: 1,583
- All statistics correct as of 27 October 2019.

The 2019 Thai League 2 is the 22nd season of the Thai League 2, the second-tier professional league for Thailand's association football clubs, since its establishment in 1997, also known as M-150 Championship due to the sponsorship deal with M-150. A total of 18 teams will compete in the league. The season began on 9 February 2019 and is scheduled to conclude on 27 October 2019.

The 1st transfer window is from 26 November 2018 to 19 February 2019 while the 2nd transfer window is from 24 June 2019 to 19 July 2019.

== Changes from last season ==
=== Team changes ===
==== From Thai League 2 ====
Promoted to 2019 Thai League 1

- PTT Rayong
- Trat
- Chiangmai

Relegated to 2019 Thai League 3

- Krabi
- Angthong

==== To Thai League 2 ====
Relegated from 2018 Thai League 1

- Bangkok Glass
- Police Tero
- Navy
- Ubon UMT United
- Air Force Central

Promoted from 2018 Thai League 3

- JL Chiangmai United
- Ayutthaya United
- Customs United

==== Renamed Clubs ====
- Bangkok Glass was renamed BG Pathum United
- Ubon UMT United was renamed Ubon United
- Air Force Central was renamed Air Force United

=== Stadium and locations ===
Locations of the 2019 Thai League 2
Football clubs in Bangkok Metropolitan Region

Team	Location	Stadium	Capacity
Air Force United	Pathum Thani	Thupatemi Stadium	20,000
Army United	Bangkok	Thai Army Sports Stadium	20,000
Ayutthaya United	Ayutthaya	Ayutthaya Provincial Stadium	6,000
BG Pathum United	Pathum Thani	Leo Stadium	9,000
Customs United	Samut Prakan	Customs Department Stadium, Ladkrabang 54	2,000
JL Chiangmai United	Chiang Mai	700th Anniversary Stadium	25,000
Kasetsart	Bangkok	TOT Stadium Chaeng Watthana	5,000
Khonkaen	Khonkaen	Khonkaen PAO. Stadium	7,000
Lampang	Lampang	Lampang Provincial Stadium	5,500
Navy	Chonburi	Sattahip Navy Stadium	6,000
Nongbua Pitchaya	Nongbua Lamphu	Nongbua Lamphu Provincial Stadium	4,333
Police Tero	Bangkok	Boonyachinda Stadium	3,550
Rayong	Rayong	Rayong Provincial Stadium	7,500
Samut Sakhon	Samut Sakhon	Samut Sakhon Provincial Stadium	3,500
Sisaket	Sisaket	Sri Nakhon Lamduan Stadium	10,000
Thai Honda	Bangkok	72nd Anniversary Stadium (Min Buri)	10,000
Ubon United	Ubon Ratchathani	UMT Stadium	6,000
Udon Thani	Udon Thani	SAT Stadium Udon Thani	10,000

=== Foreign Players ===
Club	Player 1	Player 2	Player 3	Asian Player	ASEAN Player	Former
Air Force United	(Brazil) Alex Ruela	(Brazil) Diego		(Australia) Patrick Flottmann	(Vietnam) (Ghana) Lê Văn Tân	(Afghanistan) Faysal Shayesteh (France) Greg Houla (New Zealand) Kayne Vincent
Army United	(Brazil) Flávio Boaventura	(Brazil) João Paulo	(Portugal) Bruno Pinheiro	(South Korea) Ahn Jae-jun	(Singapore) Hassan Sunny	(Brazil) Rennan Oliveira (Burkina Faso) Jonathan Zongo
Ayutthaya United	(Brazil) Moreira	(South Korea) Jo Tae-keun	(Martinique) Kévin Parsemain	(South Korea) Jeong Woo-geun	(Laos) Phithack Kongmathilath	(Brazil) Neto (United States) Chris Cortez
BG Pathum United	(Brazil) Jonatan Reis	(Brazil) Barros Tardeli	(Spain) Toti	(Japan) Seiya Kojima	(Singapore) Irfan Fandi	(Brazil) Rômulo (Japan) Yuki Bamba
Customs United	(Japan) Masaya Jitozono	(New Zealand) Kayne Vincent	(Serbia) Uroš Stojanov	(Japan) Goshi Okubo		(Cameroon) Isaac Mbengan (Japan) Naoto Kidoku
JL Chiangmai United	(Brazil) Soares	(El Salvador) David Rugamas	(Paraguay) Anggello Machuca	(South Korea) Woo Hyun	(Philippines) Hikaru Minegishi	(Brazil) Erivelto
Kasetsart	(Brazil) Alexandre Balotelli	(Ivory Coast) Henri Jöel	(Mali) Boubacar Koné	(Japan) Kenzo Nambu		(Brazil) Marcinho (South Korea) Seo Dong-hyeon
Khon Kaen	(Brazil) Fellipe Veloso	(Japan) Seiya Sugishita		(South Korea) Kim Seong-hyeon		(Brazil) Cristian Alex (Brazil) Thales (Laos) Chanthaphone Waenvongsoth
Lampang	(Brazil) Rafael Coelho	(Netherlands) Melvin de Leeuw	(Netherlands) Kevin Brands	(Afghanistan) Faysal Shayesteh		(Japan) Masaya Jitozono
Navy	(Brazil) Frauches	(South Korea) Baek Seung-hyun	(Spain) Toni Dovale	(South Korea) Choi Jung-han		(South Korea) Jin Sang-min (South Korea) Kim Seong-sik
Nongbua Pitchaya	(Brazil) Ramon	(Brazil) Rodrigo Maranhão	(Colombia) Bladimir Díaz	(Syria) Christer Youssef	(Singapore) Izwan Mahbud	(Brazil) Dennis Murillo (Spain) David Cuerva
Police Tero	(France) Greg Houla	(France) Simon Dia	(Ghana) Isaac Honny	(South Korea) Kwon Dae-hee	(Malaysia) Dominic Tan	(Brazil) Antonio Pina (Brazil) Josimar
Rayong	(Brazil) Harrison	(Brazil) Tiago Chulapa	(South Korea) Park Tae-hyeong	(Japan) Ryo Matsumura		(Brazil) Thiago Santos (Laos) Chanthachone Thinolath
Samut Sakhon	(Brazil) Bruno Dybal	(Brazil) Cristiano	(Brazil) Neto	(South Korea) Lee Won-young	(Myanmar) Than Htet Aung	(Brazil) Ricardo Pires (Madagascar) Njiva Rakotoharimalala
Sisaket	(Brazil) Willen	(Ivory Coast) Marc Landry Babo	(Ghana) Dominic Adiyiah	(Japan) Hiromichi Katano		
Thai Honda	(Brazil) Valdo	(Brazil) Thiago Santos	(Croatia) Aleksandar Kapisoda	(Japan) Kento Nagasaki		(Japan) Ryotaro Nakano
Ubon United	(Brazil) Rogerio	(Egypt) Sayed Mohamed	(Japan) Renshi Yamaguchi			(Brazil) Marlon Silva (Brazil) Diego Lima
Udon Thani	(Brazil) Bruno Correa	(Brazil) Erivelto	(Brazil) Rennan Oliveira	(Japan) Sho Shimoji		(Brazil) Adilson Bahia

== League table ==
=== Standings ===
Pos	Team	Pld	W	D	L	GF	GA	GD	Pts	Qualification or relegation
1	BG Pathum United (C, P)	34	24	6	4	76	27	+49	78	Promotion to 2020 Thai League 1
2	Police Tero (P)	34	19	8	7	64	31	+33	65	Promotion to 2020 Thai League 1
3	Rayong (P)	34	18	7	9	70	59	+11	61	Promotion to 2020 Thai League 1
4	Sisaket (Note: Sisaket was docked 12 points due to decision of FIFA about dispute between Sisaket(Esan United) and former players including docked 6 points about dispute with Kouen Hyuk-jin and more 6 points with Khaled Farid Kharroubi.)	34	20	11	3	54	21	+33	59	
5	Army United	34	15	10	9	56	43	+13	55	Club resigned and folded
6	Thai Honda	34	13	12	9	52	40	+12	51 (Note: Thai Honda ahead on head-to-head record; Thai Honda 4 pts, Udon Thani 1 pt.)	Club resigned and folded
7	Udon Thani	34	15	6	13	44	43	+1	51	
8	Khon Kaen	34	13	10	11	40	48	−8	49	
9	Nongbua Pitchaya	34	12	10	12	43	42	+1	46	
10	Lampang	34	11	12	11	41	45	−4	45	
11	JL Chiangmai United	34	10	10	14	43	43	0	40 (Note: JL Chiangmai United ahead on head-to-head record; JL Chiangmai United 3 pts (GD+2), Kasetsart 3 pts (GD-2).)	
12	Kasetsart	34	10	10	14	40	43	−3	40	
13	Samut Sakhon	34	8	10	16	43	71	−28	34 (Note: Samut Sakhon ahead on head-to-head record; Samut Sakhon 4 pts, Air Force United 1 pt.)	
14	Air Force United	34	9	7	18	39	53	−14	34	
15	MOF Customs United	34	9	6	19	39	68	−29	33 (Note: MOF Customs United ahead on head-to-head record; MOF Customs United 4 pts, Navy 1 pt.)	
16	Navy	34	9	6	19	35	50	−15	33	
17	Ubon United (R)	34	8	6	20	31	56	−25	30	Relegation to 2020 Thai League 4 (Note: Ubon United administratively relegated to 2020 Thai League 4 by FA Thailand decision because of the failure about club licensing.)
18	Ayutthaya United	34	5	9	20	37	64	−27	24	

Source: Thai League
Rules for classification: 1) Points; 2) Head-to-head points; 3) Head-to-head goal difference; 4) Head-to-head goal scored; 5) Overall goal difference; 6) Overall goal scored; 7) Fair play points; 8) Play-off without extra time).
(C) Champions; (P) Promoted; (R) Relegated

=== Positions by round ===
Team ╲ Round	1	2	3	4	5	6	7	8	9	10	11	12	13	14	15	16	17	18	19	20	21	22	23	24	25	26	27	28	29	30	31	32	33	34
BG Pathum United	1	1	1	1	1	3	2	2	1	1	1	1	1	1	1	1	1	1	1	1	1	1	1	1	1	1	1	1	1	1	1	1	1	1
Police Tero	8	5	3	5	7	5	4	5	5	5	6	6	6	8	6	6	4	3	3	2	2	2	2	2	2	2	2	2	2	2	2	2	2	2
Rayong	9	15	15	16	11	9	10	9	9	9	8	8	7	7	9	9	10	10	10	7	7	5	3	3	5	5	3	3	3	5	5	4	3	3
Sisaket	10	13	7	6	4	4	6	4	4	3	3	3	3	3	5	4	5	4	5	9	8	7	7	7	7	7	7	6	5	3	3	3	4	4
Army United	3	3	2	2	2	1	1	1	2	2	2	2	2	2	2	2	2	2	2	3	3	3	4	4	3	3	4	4	4	4	4	5	5	5
Thai Honda	11	14	16	17	18	13	14	13	13	12	11	11	11	10	7	8	7	6	4	5	5	8	8	8	8	8	8	8	7	8	8	7	7	6
Udon Thani	7	10	6	7	6	7	7	7	7	7	9	9	8	6	8	7	9	7	7	4	6	4	5	5	4	4	6	5	6	6	6	6	6	7
Khon Kaen	16	18	18	15	17	17	11	11	10	11	10	7	10	9	10	10	8	9	9	8	9	10	9	9	9	9	9	9	9	9	9	10	8	8
Nongbua Pitchaya	5	4	5	4	5	6	5	6	6	6	5	4	4	4	4	5	6	8	8	10	10	9	10	10	11	10	10	10	10	10	10	9	10	9
Lampang	4	2	4	3	3	2	3	3	3	4	4	5	5	5	3	3	3	5	6	6	4	6	6	6	6	6	5	7	8	7	7	8	9	10
JL Chiangmai United	13	6	10	11	12	11	12	15	15	16	14	14	13	13	14	13	13	13	13	12	11	11	11	11	10	11	11	11	11	11	11	11	11	11
Kasetsart	2	7	8	9	10	12	13	12	11	13	13	13	12	12	11	11	11	12	12	13	13	13	13	12	12	12	12	12	12	12	12	12	12	12
Samut Sakhon	6	9	9	10	8	8	9	10	12	10	7	10	9	11	12	14	12	11	11	11	12	12	12	13	13	13	13	13	14	13	14	13	13	13
Air Force United	15	11	12	13	13	14	15	16	16	17	18	18	18	18	18	18	18	18	18	18	18	17	18	17	16	15	16	15	13	14	13	14	15	14
MOF Customs United	18	17	17	18	15	15	17	18	18	14	16	17	17	17	17	17	15	16	15	16	16	14	15	16	17	17	17	17	17	15	17	15	14	15
Navy	14	16	11	12	14	18	18	14	14	15	17	16	16	16	16	15	16	15	16	14	14	15	16	14	14	14	14	14	15	16	15	16	16	16
Ubon United	17	12	13	8	9	10	8	8	8	8	12	12	14	14	13	12	14	14	14	15	15	16	14	15	15	16	15	16	16	17	16	17	17	17
Ayutthaya United	12	8	14	14	16	16	16	17	17	18	15	15	15	15	15	16	17	17	17	17	17	18	17	18	18	18	18	18	18	18	18	18	18	18

Source: Thai League
= Leader and promotion to 2020 Thai League 1; = Promotion to 2020 Thai League 1; = Relegation to 2020 Thai League 3

=== Results by round ===
Team ╲ Round	1	2	3	4	5	6	7	8	9	10	11	12	13	14	15	16	17	18	19	20	21	22	23	24	25	26	27	28	29	30	31	32	33	34
BG Pathum United	W	W	W	W	W	L	W	W	W	W	D	W	W	W	W	D	W	W	D	L	W	D	W	L	W	W	W	L	W	W	D	W	D	W
Police Tero	D	W	W	D	L	W	W	L	W	D	L	L	W	L	W	D	W	W	W	W	W	D	W	D	L	D	D	W	W	L	W	W	W	W
Rayong	D	L	D	L	W	W	L	W	D	L	W	D	W	W	L	D	D	L	W	W	W	W	W	W	L	D	W	W	W	L	W	W	W	L
Sisaket	D	D	W	W	W	D	D	W	W	W	D	D	L	W	W	W	L	W	D	W	W	W	D	D	W	D	W	W	W	W	W	W	D	L
Army United	W	W	W	W	W	W	D	W	L	W	L	W	D	L	D	D	L	W	D	D	D	L	D	W	W	D	L	W	W	D	W	L	L	L
Thai Honda	D	L	L	L	L	W	D	D	D	W	W	L	W	W	W	D	W	W	W	D	D	L	D	L	D	W	D	W	D	L	L	W	D	W
Udon Thani	W	L	W	D	W	L	W	L	D	D	L	D	W	W	L	W	L	W	W	W	L	W	L	W	W	D	L	W	L	L	W	L	D	L
Khon Kaen	L	L	L	W	L	D	W	L	W	D	W	W	L	W	L	W	W	D	D	D	L	D	W	D	L	D	W	D	D	W	L	L	W	W
Nongbua Pitchaya	W	D	W	W	L	D	W	L	D	W	W	W	L	W	L	L	L	L	D	L	L	W	D	L	D	D	W	D	L	D	D	W	L	W
Lampang	W	W	D	W	W	W	D	W	D	L	L	D	L	W	W	D	L	D	D	D	W	L	D	D	W	D	W	L	L	D	L	L	L	L
JL Chiangmai United	L	W	L	L	D	D	L	L	W	L	W	L	W	D	D	D	D	D	D	W	W	L	D	W	W	L	L	L	W	D	L	L	L	W
Kasetsart	W	L	D	D	L	L	L	D	W	D	D	D	W	L	W	L	W	L	L	L	L	W	L	W	L	D	W	L	L	D	D	W	D	W
Samut Sakhon	W	L	D	D	W	D	L	L	W	D	W	L	D	L	L	L	W	W	D	L	D	L	D	L	L	D	L	D	L	W	L	W	L	L
Air Force United	L	W	L	L	D	L	L	L	D	L	D	D	L	L	L	L	W	L	D	D	L	W	L	W	W	D	L	W	W	L	W	L	L	W
MOF Customs United	L	L	L	L	W	D	L	L	D	W	L	L	L	L	W	D	W	L	D	L	D	W	L	L	L	L	L	D	W	W	L	W	W	L
Navy	L	L	W	L	L	L	L	W	L	L	D	D	W	L	L	W	L	D	L	W	D	L	L	W	W	D	L	L	L	L	D	L	W	W
Ubon United	L	W	L	W	L	D	W	W	L	L	L	L	L	D	W	D	L	L	L	L	L	D	W	L	L	L	W	L	L	D	D	L	W	L
Ayutthaya United	L	W	L	L	L	D	L	D	L	W	D	W	L	L	L	D	L	L	L	D	D	L	D	L	L	W	L	L	L	W	D	L	D	L

W = Won; D = Drawn; L = Lost

=== Results ===
Home \ Away	AFU	AMU	AYU	BPU	JCU	KAS	KKN	LPG	MCU	NVY	NBP	PLT	RAY	SKN	SIS	THD	UBU	UDT
Air Force United	—	4–2	0–1	2–2	1–1	3–0	1–2	1–1	0–1	2–0	1–3	0–1	2–1	2–3	0–2	2–1	0–1	2–1
Army United	3–1	—	1–1	2–2	1–0	2–1	4–0	0–2	3–1	2–1	1–0	0–2	1–2	4–1	4–4	2–2	5–0	1–0
Ayutthaya United	1–2	2–3	—	3–3	2–2	1–1	0–0	3–4	1–2	0–2	1–2	0–6	0–0	0–2	1–1	1–1	1–2	0–3
BG Pathum United	1–0	2–1	1–0	—	0–1	2–1	1–0	7–1	3–0	3–0	2–0	1–1	7–2	6–1	1–0	1–0	4–1	1–0
JL Chiangmai United	4–1	0–0	1–0	2–3	—	3–0	6–0	0–1	1–2	0–3	2–3	2–1	2–2	0–1	1–1	0–3	2–2	3–1
Kasetsart	1–1	1–2	2–0	0–1	1–0	—	3–1	2–3	4–1	2–0	2–2	1–1	1–3	2–1	0–1	2–1	2–1	1–1
Khon Kaen	1–0	1–0	3–2	0–0	0–0	1–0	—	0–2	3–2	3–1	2–1	1–2	2–3	2–1	1–2	2–2	1–1	1–1
Lampang	2–0	0–0	1–1	0–1	1–2	0–1	2–3	—	1–3	2–0	2–2	1–1	2–6	1–1	0–2	0–0	2–0	1–0
MOF Customs United	1–2	3–3	0–3	0–4	0–0	1–0	0–2	1–0	—	2–2	2–2	1–2	0–2	1–1	1–2	1–2	1–3	1–2
Navy	3–1	1–1	3–2	1–2	0–2	1–1	0–1	0–0	0–1	—	1–0	0–2	0–1	0–1	0–0	2–1	1–0	1–1
Nongbua Pitchaya	0–0	0–2	2–1	1–3	1–1	2–1	0–1	2–0	4–0	2–1	—	0–2	1–0	2–2	1–1	2–2	0–2 (Note: 29 May 2019, Nongbua Pitchaya was forfeited and awarded 2–0 to Ubon United by the reason of power failure.)	3–1
Police Tero	2–1	2–0	4–1	2–1	1–0	1–1	2–1	1–2	2–1	0–1	1–0	—	7–0	2–2	0–1	1–1	5–0	3–2
Rayong	2–2	3–1	2–1	2–4	3–1	1–1	4–1	3–3	5–0	3–1	1–0	1–1	—	2–1	1–1	3–2	1–0	4–2
Samut Sakhon	2–2	1–1	2–3	0–3	1–2	1–1	2–2	0–0	1–4	1–4	1–2	1–3	3–2	—	0–2	2–1	1–0	3–2
Sisaket	3–0	1–1	3–0	0–0	3–1	2–0	0–0	0–0	3–0	3–2	1–0	3–1	3–1	4–0	—	0–0	1–0	1–0
Thai Honda	2–1	1–2	2–1	1–0	2–0	1–1	1–0	1–1	1–2	2–0	1–1	3–2	4–1	1–1	3–0	—	1–2	1–0
Ubon United	1–2	0–1	0–1	1–4	1–1	0–3	1–1	0–3	2–1	4–2	0–0	0–0	0–2	5–0	0–3	0–1	—	0–1
Udon Thani	1–0	1–0	1–2	1–0	1–0	1–0	1–1	1–0	2–2	2–1	1–2	1–0	2–1	3–2	1–0	4–4	2–1	—

Source: Thai League
Legend: Blue = home team win; Yellow = draw; Red = away team win.
For upcoming matches, an "a" indicates there is an article about the rivalry between the two participants.

== Season statistics ==
=== Top scorers ===
As of 27 October 2019.

Rank	Player	Club	Goals
1	(Brazil) Tiago Chulapa	Rayong	19
2	(Brazil) Barros Tardeli	BG Pathum United	18
2	(Brazil) Willen Mota	Sisaket	18
2	(Brazil) Bruno Correa	Udon Thani	18
5	(Brazil) Valdo	Thai Honda	17
6	(Thailand) Tanakorn Dangthong	Army United	16
7	(Brazil) Rafael Coelho	Lampang	13
7	(Brazil) Erivelto	JL Chiangmai United (8 Goals); Udon Thani (5 Goals)	13
9	(Thailand) Surachat Sareepim	BG Pathum United	12
9	(New Zealand) Kayne Vincent	Air Force United (6 Goals); Customs United (6 Goals)	12
9	(Brazil) Hiziel Souza Soares	JL Chiangmai United	12
9	(Japan) Seiya Sugishita	Khonkaen	12
9	(Ivory Coast) Marc Landry Babo	Sisaket	12

=== Hat-tricks ===
Player	For	Against	Result	Date
(Brazil) Erivelto^{4}	JL Chiangmai United	Khonkaen	6–0	16 February 2019
(Brazil) Josimar	Police Tero	Ayutthaya United	6–0	23 February 2019
(Paraguay) Anggello Machuca	JL Chiangmai United	Air Force United	4–1	20 July 2019
(Brazil) João Paulo	Army United	Sisaket	4–4	31 July 2019
(Colombia) Bladimir Díaz	Nongbua Pitchaya	Udon Thani	3–1	21 August 2019
(Brazil) Jonatan Ferreira Reis^{4}	BG Pathum United	Lampang	7–1	14 September 2019
(Brazil) Willen Mota	Sisaket	Samut Sakhon	4–0	25 September 2019
(France) Greg Houla	Police Tero	Ubon United	5–0	29 September 2019
(Brazil) Harrison Cardoso	Rayong	Lampang	6–2	29 September 2019
(France) Simon Dia	Police Tero	Rayong	7–0	27 October 2019

== Attendance ==
=== Overall statistics ===
Pos	Team	Total	High	Low	Average	Change
1	BG Pathum United	74,083	5,904	3,102	4,358	−10.0%
2	Sisaket	50,586	10,892	1,056	2,976	+224.9%
3	Udon Thani	46,529	5,274	1,213	2,737	−16.6%
4	Khonkaen	45,367	4,475	1,586	2,669	−37.4%
5	Rayong	33,123	3,680	800	1,948	+14.7%
6	Nongbua Pitchaya	24,397	2,160	870	1,435	−31.1%
7	Ubon United	23,325	2,512	862	1,372	−43.5%
8	Air Force United	23,155	3,794	589	1,362	−36.0%
9	Thai Honda	21,884	6,921	601	1,287	+55.6%
10	Navy	21,724	1,740	1,029	1,278	−49.2%
11	Army United	20,563	2,386	554	1,206	+51.3%
12	Police Tero	19,951	3,948	389	1,174	−52.5%
13	Lampang	17,336	1,647	637	1,018	−10.9%
14	Samut Sakhon	16,613	1,227	783	977	−21.3%
15	Ayutthaya United	16,237	1,924	413	955	−1.0%^{†}
16	Customs United	9,978	1,600	162	587	+48.6%^{†}
17	Kasetsart	9,878	2,248	268	581	−9.2%
18	JL Chiangmai United	9,143	1,454	169	538	−2.7%^{†}
	League total	484,252	10,892	162	1,583	+2.1%

Updated to games played on 27 October 2019
Source: Thai League 2
Notes:
^{†} Teams played previous season in Thai League 3

=== Attendance by home match played ===
Team \ Match played	1	2	3	4	5	6	7	8	9	10	11	12	13	14	15	16	17	Total
Air Force United	1,756	1,756	1,456	1,154	1,024	1,254	2,159	1,289	719	589	759	1,159	1,127	989	632	3,794	1,539	23,155
Army United	1,428	2,106	2,386	1,222	1,223	901	1,760	708	967	843	1,475	797	794	907	1,000	554	1,492	20,563
Ayutthaya United	1,425	1,350	1,483	1,924	868	796	609	1,050	900	1,065	874	697	750	666	654	713	413	16,237
BG Pathum United	5,056	4,502	4,291	4,135	3,834	3,582	4,327	3,947	3,102	5,335	4,211	4,737	3,509	3,964	3,834	5,813	5,904	74,083
Customs United	585	1,600	162	440	256	820	590	252	500	670	453	800	580	500	470	480	820	9,978
JL Chiangmai United	719	1,454	455	549	597	606	309	457	544	550	554	292	265	985	227	169	411	9,143
Kasetsart	922	1,022	742	438	430	287	310	520	270	2,248	522	412	515	268	315	282	375	9,878
Khonkaen	3,818	2,447	2,523	2,722	3,583	4,475	2,379	2,474	2,255	2,577	4,172	1,830	1,586	2,148	2,062	1,880	2,436	45,367
Lampang	1,101	1,238	1,124	1,085	1,442	1,647	879	1,157	1,050	686	1,108	1,148	805	1,198	658	637	733	17,336
Navy	1,620	1,340	1,051	1,476	1,107	1,740	1,336	1,098	1,356	1,421	1,178	1,186	1,203	1,277	1,215	1,091	1,029	21,724
Nongbua Pitchaya	1,633	2,015	1,795	1,682	1,434	1,343	974	1,166	1,632	1,186	1,380	1,074	1,002	2,160	1,139	870	1,912	24,397
Police Tero	1,280	1,065	1,946	685	862	792	389	890	885	1,017	782	759	762	482	2,478	929	3,948	19,951
Rayong	800	1,675	1,868	1,965	1,568	1,888	1,366	1,336	1,868	1,986	1,863	1,868	1,963	3,680	1,919	1,860	3,650	33,123
Samut Sakhon	1,145	1,019	1,123	1,075	873	1,227	1,072	1,123	972	872	837	783	856	936	835	1,049	816	16,613
Sisaket	2,468	1,762	1,282	3,008	2,471	2,495	1,056	1,201	1,950	2,148	2,811	3,202	2,965	2,332	3,580	4,963	10,892	50,586
Thai Honda	1,008	740	920	780	875	1,153	880	601	1,151	910	953	707	871	1,811	880	723	6,921	21,884
Ubon United	1,052	1,552	1,210	1,123	2,143	1,115	1,015	963	2,000	1,222	1,115	1,235	1,315	2,028	862	863	2,512	23,325
Udon Thani	3,659	3,069	2,539	2,529	2,985	5,274	2,849	2,149	2,132	1,925	3,465	4,218	2,609	2,390	2,198	1,213	1,326	46,529

Source: Thai League 2

== See also ==
- 2019 Thai League 1
- 2019 Thai League 3
- 2019 Thai League 4
- 2019 Thailand Amateur League
- 2019 Thai FA Cup
- 2019 Thai League Cup
- 2019 Thailand Champions Cup
