= 2019 Thai League 3 =

- Season: 2019
- Dates: 9 February 2019 – 29 September 2019
- Champions: Final stage Khon Kaen United; Regional stage Khon Kaen United (Upper Region); Nakhon Pathom United (Lower Region)
- Promoted: Khon Kaen United; Nakhon Pathom United; Phrae United; Ranong United
- Relegated: Marines Eureka (Upper Region); Royal Thai Army (Lower Region); Surat Thani (Lower Region)
- Matches: 326
- Goals: 863 (2.65 per match)
- Top goalscorer: (Brazil) Natan Oliveira (19 goals)
- Biggest home win: 6 goals difference Nakhon Pathom United 6–0 Surat Thani (8 September 2019)
- Biggest away win: 7 goals difference Sakaeo 0–7 Bangkok (11 May 2019)
- Highest scoring: 9 goals scored Nakhon Pathom United 7–2 Royal Thai Army (21 August 2019)
- Longest winning run: 8 matches Phrae United
- Longest unbeaten run: 20 matches Nakhon Pathom United
- Longest winless run: 21 matches Surat Thani
- Longest losing run: 8 matches Surat Thani
- Highest attendance: 6,391; Khonkaen United 2–1 Nakhon Pathom United (29 September 2019)
- Lowest attendance: 22; Chiangrai City 1–1 Ayutthaya (10 August 2019)
- Total attendance: 184,825
- Average attendance: 542

The 2019 Thai League 3 is the third season of the Thai League 3, the third-tier professional league for association football clubs in Thailand, since its establishment in 2017, also known as Omsin League Pro due to the sponsorship deal with Government Savings Bank (Omsin Bank). A total of 28 teams would divided into 2 regions including 14 teams in the upper region and 14 teams in the lower region.

After Army United FC announced its dissolution in the end of the season, Ranong United was choose as the third team to promoted to Thai League 2.

== Changes from last season ==
=== Team changes ===
==== Promoted clubs ====
Promoted to the 2019 Thai League 2

- JL Chiangmai United
- MOF Customs United
- Ayutthaya United

Promoted from the 2018 Thai League 4

- Nakhon Pathom United
- Khon Kaen United
- North Bangkok University

==== Relegated clubs ====
Relegated to the 2019 Thai League 4 Northeastern Region

- Kalasin

Relegated to the 2019 Thai League 4 Bangkok Metropolitan Region

- Deffo

Relegated from 2018 Thai League 2

- Krabi
- Angthong

==== Renamed clubs ====
- WU Nakhon Si United was renamed to Nakhon Si United

==== Moved clubs ====
- Simork were moved into the Upper Region 2019.

== 2019 Thai League 3 locations ==
=== Stadium and locations (Upper Region) ===
Locations of the 2019 Thai League 3 All Teams
2019 Thai League 3 Upper Region
2019 Thai League 3 Lower Region
Football clubs in Bangkok Metro

Team	Location	Stadium	Capacity
Angthong	Angthong	Ang Thong Province Stadium	6,000
Ayutthaya	Ayutthaya	Udhomseelwitthaya School Stadium	1,800
Bangkok	Nonthaburi	SCG Stadium	12,505
Chachoengsao	Chachoengsao	Chachoengsao Municipality Stadium	6,000
Chiangrai City	Chiang Rai	Chiangrai Province Stadium	5,000
Kamphaengphet	Kamphaengphet	Cha Kung Rao Stadium	2,406
Khonkaen United	Khon Kaen	Khonkaen PAO. Stadium	7,000
Lamphun Warrior	Lamphun	Mae-Guang Stadium	3,000
Marines Eureka	Chonburi	Sattahip Navy Stadium	6,000
Muangkan United	Kanchanaburi	Kleebbua Stadium	5,403
Phrae United	Phrae	Thunghong Municipality Stadium	4,500
Sakaeo	Sakaeo	Sakaeo PAO. Stadium	10,000
Simork	Suphanburi	Suphanburi Sports School Stadium	1,500
Ubon Ratchathani	Ubon Ratchathani	Ubon Ratchathani University Stadium	2,000

=== Stadium and locations (Lower Region) ===
Team	Location	Stadium	Capacity
BTU United	Bangkok	Bangkok-Thonburi University Stadium	1,500
Chamchuri United	Bangkok	Chulalongkorn University Stadium	20,000
Kasem Bundit University	Bangkok	Kasem Bundit University Stadium, Rom Klao	2,000
Krabi	Krabi	Krabi Provincial Stadium	8,000
Nakhon Pathom United	Nakhon Pathom	Nakhon Pathom Municipality Sport School Stadium	6,000
Nakhon Si United	Nakhon Si Thammarat	Nakhon Si Thammarat PAO. Stadium	10,000
Nara United	Narathiwat	Narathiwat PAO. Stadium	5,000
North Bangkok University	Pathum Thani	North Bangkok University Stadium (Rangsit)	3,000
Phuket City	Phuket	Surakul Stadium	15,000
Rajpracha	Bangkok	Thonburi Stadium	5,000
Ranong United	Ranong	Ranong Provincial Stadium	7,000
Royal Thai Army	Bangkok	Thai Army Sports Stadium	20,000
Surat Thani	Surat Thani	Surat Thani Provincial Stadium	10,000
Trang	Trang	Trang Municipality Stadium	5,000

== Results ==
=== League table (Upper Region) ===
Pos	Team	Pld	W	D	L	GF	GA	GD	Pts	Qualification or relegation
1	Khonkaen United (C, P)	24	18	5	1	57	19	+38	59	Qualification to final and promotion to 2020 Thai League 2
2	Phrae United (Q, P)	24	18	4	2	48	13	+35	58	Qualification to third place play-offs
3	Lamphun Warrior	24	13	6	5	39	23	+16	45	
4	Angthong	24	11	5	8	37	29	+8	38	
5	Bangkok	24	11	4	9	47	35	+12	37	
6	Chachoengsao	24	8	6	10	19	26	−7	30 (Note: Chachoengsao ahead on head-to-head record; Chachoengsao 4 pts, Ubon Ratchathani 1 pts.)	
7	Ubon Ratchathani	24	8	6	10	23	35	−12	30	
8	Kamphaengphet	24	7	5	12	21	33	−12	26	
9	Chiangrai City	24	6	6	12	33	44	−11	24	
10	Muangkan United	24	4	11	9	24	35	−11	23 (Note: Muangkan United ahead on head-to-head record; Muangkan United 3 pts, Sakaeo 3 pts.)	
11	Sakaeo	24	6	5	13	18	40	−22	23	
12	Ayutthaya	24	6	4	14	20	31	−11	22	
13	Marines Eureka (R)	24	4	5	15	17	40	−23	17	Relegation to the 2020 Thai League 4
14	Simork	0	0	0	0	0	0	0	0	

Updated to match(es) played on 8 September 2019. Source: Thai League 3
Rules for classification: 1) Points; 2) Head-to-head; 3) Goal difference; 4) Goals scored;).
(C) Champions; (P) Promoted; (Q) Qualified for the phase indicated; (R) Relegated

=== League table (Lower Region) ===
Pos	Team	Pld	W	D	L	GF	GA	GD	Pts	Qualification or relegation
1	Nakhon Pathom United (Q, P)	26	18	7	1	57	18	+39	61	Qualification to final and promotion to 2020 Thai League 2
2	Ranong United (Q, P)	26	14	8	4	45	20	+25	50	Qualification to third place play-offs
3	Nara United	26	11	11	4	42	26	+16	44	
4	Trang	26	11	8	7	31	27	+4	41	
5	North Bangkok University	26	10	10	6	29	20	+9	40	
6	Phuket City	26	10	7	9	33	36	−3	37	
7	Krabi	26	10	6	10	34	29	+5	36	
8	Kasem Bundit University	26	9	8	9	36	36	0	35	
9	BTU United	26	8	9	9	36	30	+6	33	
10	Nakhon Si United	26	8	8	10	29	38	−9	32	
11	Chamchuri United	26	7	8	11	33	42	−9	29	
12	Rajpracha	26	7	6	13	19	33	−14	27	
13	Royal Thai Army (R)	26	4	7	15	29	45	−16	19	Relegation to the 2020 Thai League 4
14	Surat Thani (R)	26	1	5	20	20	72	−52	8	Relegation to the 2020 Thai League 4

Updated to match(es) played on 8 September 2019. Source: Thai League 3
Rules for classification: 1) Points; 2) Head-to-head; 3) Goal difference; 4) Goals scored;).
(P) Promoted; (Q) Qualified for the phase indicated; (R) Relegated

=== Third place play-off ===
This round was featured by Phrae United, the second place of 2019 Thai League 3 Upper Region and Ranong United, the second place of 2019 Thai League 3 Lower Region. Winners of third place play-off would promoted to 2020 Thai League 2.

==== Summary ====
Team 1	Agg.	Team 2	1st leg	2nd leg
Phrae United	1–0	Ranong United	0–0	1–0

==== Matches ====
21 September 2019
18:00 UTC+7

Phrae United	0 – 0	Ranong United
	Report

Thunghong Subdistrict Municipality Stadium, Phrae
Attendance: 1,234
Referee: Suwat Wongsuwan (Thailand)
28 September 2019
18:00 UTC+7

Ranong United	0 – 1	Phrae United
	Report	Welington Smith 63'

Ranong Provincial Stadium, Ranong
Attendance: 1,500
Referee: Noppadet Mangngam (Thailand)

Phrae United won 1–0 on aggregate.

=== Final ===
This round was featured by Khon Kaen United, the first place of 2019 Thai League 3 Upper Region and Nakhon Pathom United, the first place of 2019 Thai League 3 Lower Region. Both winners and runners-up would promoted to 2020 Thai League 2 automatically.

==== Summary ====
Team 1	Agg.	Team 2	1st leg	2nd leg
Nakhon Pathom United	2–4	Khon Kaen United	1–2	1–2

==== Matches ====
22 September 2019
18:00 UTC+7

Nakhon Pathom United	1 – 2	Khon Kaen United
Ferreira dos Santos 73'	Report	Conrado 33'; Nishihara Takumu 71'

Nakhon Pathom Municipality Sport School Stadium, Nakhon Pathom
Attendance: 3,625
Referee: Wachirapan Prasomphon (Thailand)
29 September 2019
19:00 UTC+7

Khon Kaen United	2 – 1	Nakhon Pathom United
Conrado 41'; Natan Oliveira 55'	Report	Atikan Koakaew 13'

Khon Kaen PAO. Stadium, Khon Kaen
Attendance: 6,391
Referee: Tastarawut Khantavichai (Thailand)

Khon Kaen United won 4–2 on aggregate.

== See also ==
- 2019 Thai League 1
- 2019 Thai League 2
- 2019 Thai League 4
- 2020 Thailand Amateur League
