= Maurinho (footballer, born 1989) =

Brazilian footballer

Personal information
- Full name: Mauro Job Pontes Júnior
- Date of birth: 10 December 1989 (age 36)
- Place of birth: Canoas, Rio Grande do Sul, Brazil
- Height: 1.73 m (5 ft 8 in)
- Position: Forward

Team information
- Current team: Operário-MS

Senior career*
Years	Team	Apps	(Gls)
2011	Metropolitano	0	(0)
2012	Dinamo Minsk	0	(0)
2012	XV de Indaial	0	(0)
2012–2014	Metropolitano	31	(9)
2013	→ Internacional (loan)	5	(2)
2013	→ ABC (loan)	8	(1)
2014–2016	Criciúma	38	(4)
2016	→ Oeste (loan)	24	(0)
2016	→ Jeonnam Dragons (loan)	7	(0)
2017	FC Seoul	9	(0)
2017–2018	Avaí	16	(0)
2019	Ferroviária	10	(2)
2019	PT Prachuap	14	(2)
2020	CRB	8	(0)
2020	Ferroviária	5	(1)
2020–2021	Vila Nova	9	(1)
2021	Novo Hamburgo	5	(0)
2021	EC São Bernardo	4	(1)
2021	Botafogo da Paraíba	2	(1)
2021	Aimoré	9	(0)
2022	Uberlândia	5	(0)
2022	EC São Bernardo	3	(0)
2022	PT Prachuap	6	(1)
2023	Novo Hamburgo	9	(0)
2023	→ Manauara (loan)	1	(0)
2023	Bagé		
2023	Germania Walsrode		
2024–	Operário-MS		
- * Club domestic league appearances and goals as of 5 June 2023

Mauro Job Pontes Júnior (born 10 December 1989), commonly known as Maurinho, is a Brazilian footballer who plays as a forward for Operário-MS.

== Honours ==
=== Club ===
PT Prachuap FC

- Thai League Cup (1) : 2019
