= Simon Dia =

French footballer (born 1992)

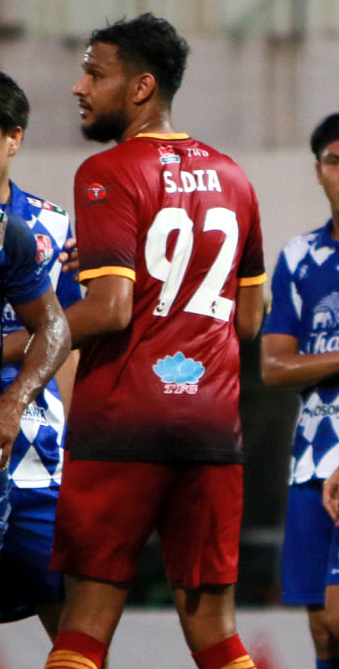
- Simon Dia playing for Kasetsart

Personal information
- Full name: Ousmane Simon Pierre Alexandre Dia
- Date of birth: 17 July 1992 (age 34)
- Place of birth: Saint-Quentin, France
- Height: 1.93 m (6 ft 4 in)
- Position: Forward

Team information
- Current team: Bangkok
- Number: 92

Youth career
- Lille
- Valenciennes

Senior career*
Years	Team	Apps	(Gls)
2010–2014	Valenciennes	0	(0)
2011–2014	Valenciennes B	45	(15)
2012–2013	→ Lekhwiya (loan)	4	(0)
2014–2015	Amiens	18	(1)
2015–2017	Saint-Quentin	51	(21)
2017–2019	Entente SSG	61	(10)
2019	Police Tero	15	(9)
2020	Chainat Hornbill	6	(1)
2021	Ratchaburi	5	(1)
2021	Sitra	19	(1)
2022	Kasetsart	16	(7)
2023	Ayutthaya United	13	(3)
2023–2024	Olympic Charleroi	10	(1)
2024–	Bangkok	19	(1)
- * Club domestic league appearances and goals as of 10 April 2026

Ousmane Simon Pierre Alexandre Dia (born 17 July 1992) is a French professional footballer who plays as a forward for Thai League 3 club Bangkok.

== Career ==
Simon Dia was born in Saint-Quentin, France. He began his career at Valenciennes. In October 2012, Dia signed on loan for Qatari club Lekhwiya. During his time at the club, Dia made four first team appearances for the club in the Qatar Stars League.

In January 2014, Dia signed for Amiens, making his debut against Dunkerque.

On 14 August 2015, Dia signed for his hometown club of Saint-Quentin, after rejecting an offer from Belgian club Seraing.

On 1 July 2023, Dia signed for Olympic Charleroi, returning to European football for the first time since 2019.

== Personal life ==
Simon Dia is the son of Ali Dia.
