= Masaya Jitozono =

Japanese footballer

Personal information
- Date of birth: September 6, 1989 (age 37)
- Place of birth: Chiba, Japan
- Height: 1.75 m (5 ft 9 in)
- Position: Midfielder

Team information
- Current team: Lampang
- Number: 10

Youth career
- 2005–2007: JEF United Chiba
- 2008–2011: Aoyama Gakuin University

Senior career*
Years	Team	Apps	(Gls)
2012–2015	SC Sagamihara	20	(2)
2016–2017	Albirex Niigata Singapore	20	(11)
2017	Sabah FA	11	(2)
2017–2018	Nongbua Pitchaya	36	(4)
2019	Lampang	0	(0)
2019–	MOF Customs	21	(3)
- * Club domestic league appearances and goals as of September 29, 2019

Masaya Jitozono (地頭薗 雅弥, Jitozono Masaya; born September 6, 1989) is a Japanese football player. He plays for MOF Customs.

== Playing career ==
Masaya Jitozono played for SC Sagamihara from 2012 to 2015. In 2016, he moved to Albirex Niigata Singapore.

== Club career statistics ==
As of 29 Feb 2020

Club performance			League		Cup		League Cup		Total	
Season	Club	League	Apps	Goals	Apps	Goals	Apps	Goals	Apps	Goals
			League		FA Cup		league Cup		Total	
2016	Albirex Niigata (S)	S.League	22	3	4	1	3	1	29	5
Total			22	3	4	1	3	1	29	5
			League		Malaysia FA Cup		Malaysia Cup		Total	
2017	Sabah FA	Malaysia Premier League	0	0	4	0	0	0	11	2
Total			0	0	4	0	0	0	11	2
			League		Thai FA Cup		League Cup		Total	
2017	Nongbua Pitchaya F.C.	Thai League 2	0	0	0	0	0	0	36	4
Total			0	0	0	0	0	0	36	4
2019	Lampang F.C.	Thai League 2	11	0	0	0	2	1	13	1
Total			11	0	0	0	2	1	13	1
2019	MOF Customs United F.C.	Thai League 2	13	1	0	0	0	0	13	1
Total			13	1	0	0	0	0	13	1
Career total			126	30	19	8	19	4	164	43
