= Jo Tae-keun =

South Korean footballer (born 1985)

Jo Tae-keun 조태근
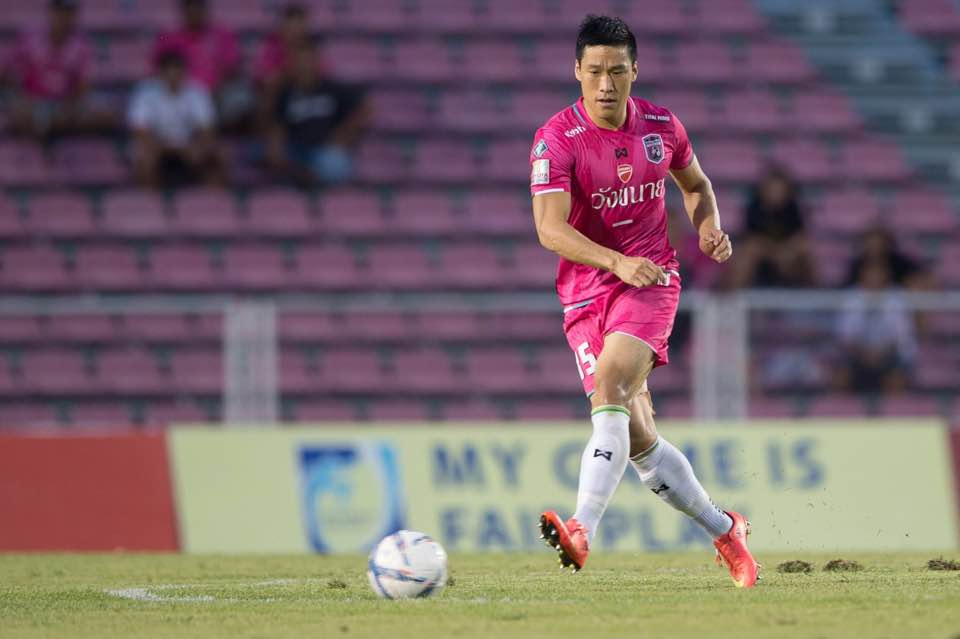

Personal information
- Full name: Jo Tae-keun
- Date of birth: 26 April 1985 (age 41)
- Place of birth: Gumi, Gyeongsangbuk-do, South Korea
- Height: 1.85 m (6 ft 1 in)
- Position: Center-back

Team information
- Current team: Ayutthaya United F.C.
- Number: 15

Youth career
- 2003 Daeryun High School
- 2007 Jeonju University

Senior career*
Years	Team	Apps	(Gls)
2008	Suwon FC		
2010–2012	Busan Transportation Corp.	40	(2)
2013–2016	Chainat Hornbill	100	(8)
2017	Chiangmai	10	(1)
2017–2018	Eastern	7	(0)
2018	Daejeon Citizen	2	(0)
2019–	Ayutthaya United	12	(0)
- * Club domestic league appearances and goals as of 17 February 2019

- Jo Tae-keun
- Hangul: 조태근
- RR: Jo Taegeun
- MR: Cho T'aegŭn

Jo Tae-keun (Korean: 조태근; born 26 April 1985) is a South Korean footballer who plays as defender for Thai League 2 club Ayutthaya United F.C.
