= Soares (footballer, born 1985) =

Brazilian footballer

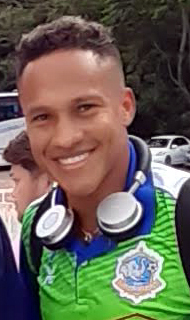

Personal information
- Full name: Hiziel Souza Soares
- Date of birth: May 16, 1985 (age 41)
- Place of birth: Manaus, Brazil
- Height: 1.74 m (5 ft 9 in)
- Position: Forward

Team information
- Current team: Atlético Catarinense

Youth career
- 2003–2005: Londrina

Senior career*
Years	Team	Apps	(Gls)
2005–2006	Londrina	0	(0)
2005–2006	Junior Team	33	(13)
2006	→ Figueirense (loan)	0	(0)
2007–2010	Fluminense	40	(6)
2008	→ Grêmio (loan)	16	(3)
2009	→ Cruzeiro (loan)	24	(4)
2010	Vitória	8	(1)
2011	Ponte Preta	11	(0)
2012	América-RN	15	(2)
2013–2014	Chapecoense	0	(0)
2014	Vila Nova	0	(0)
2015	Botafogo-PB	0	(0)
2015	Marcílio Dias	0	(0)
2016	Villa Nova-MG	9	(2)
2016	Ríver AC	2	(0)
2017	Madureira EC	4	(0)
2018–2019	Chiangmai	24	(11)
2019	→ JL Chiangmai United (loan)	32	(12)
2020	Lagarto	3	(0)
2020	Mamoré	3	(0)
2020–	Atlético Catarinense	3	(0)
- * Club domestic league appearances and goals as of 15:58, 22 December 2020 (UTC)

Hiziel Souza Soares (born 16 May 1985 in Manaus, Amazonas), commonly known as Soares, is a Brazilian football striker for Atlético Catarinense.

== Honours ==
Figueirense

- Santa Catarina State League: 2006

Fluminense

- Brazilian Cup: 2007
