= Ayutthaya United F.C. =

Thailand football club

Ayutthaya United อยุธยา ยูไนเต็ด
- Full name: Ayutthaya United Football Club สโมสรฟุตบอลอยุธยา ยูไนเต็ด
- Nicknames: The Ayothaya Warriors (นักรบอโยธยา)
- Short name: AYT
- Founded: 2007; 19 years ago, as Sena Municipality; 2016; 10 years ago, as Ayutthaya United
- Ground: Ayutthaya Province Stadium; Ayutthaya, Thailand
- Capacity: 6,000
- Chairman: Adisak Punjaruenworakul
- Head coach: Jugkrit Siriwattanasart
- League: Thai League 1
- 2025–26: Thai League 1, 10th of 16
Home colours	Away colours	Third colours

Ayutthaya United Football Club (Thai: สโมสรฟุตบอลอยุธยา ยูไนเต็ด) is a Thai professional football club based in Sena, Phra Nakhon Si Ayutthaya province. The club competes in the Thai League 1, the top tier of Thai football league system after promotion as runner-up. The club currently plays their home matches at Ayutthaya Province Stadium.

== History ==
=== Sena Municipality ===
Sena Municipality Football Club was established in 2007. They are the local football team of Sena district, Ayutthaya and they played in the "Royal football Cup". In 2008, Sena Municipality took part in the Khor Royal Cup. They were in round of 16 before losing to Assumption College Sriracha football club 2–3. In 2008–09, they again reached the round of 16 before losing to Hua-Hin Municipality 0–1.

In 2013, Sena Municipality reached the semi-final. They lost to Korat United but earned promotion to the Khǒr Royal Cup. In 2014, Sena Municipality football club played in Khǒr Royal Cup for the first time. In 2015, Sena Municipality advanced to the semi-final. Despite being defeated by Institute of Physical Education Samut Sakhon, they gained promotion.

=== As Ayutthaya United ===
After Sena Municipality got promoted to the regional division, they changed the club name to Ayutthaya United. The club played their home matches at Senabodee Stadium. On 19 March 2016, Ayutthaya United played their first match at Nakhon Sawan Province Stadium with Nakhon Sawan. Ayutthaya United won 1–0 by the goal of Rungroj Sawangsri. On 7 December 2016, Ayutthaya Warrior merged with Ayutthaya United.

=== First Division ===
On 26 April 2025, Ayutthaya United secured promotion to Thai League 1 for the first time in their history, after defeating Bangkok FC 5–1 and finishing the 2024–25 Thai League 2 season as runners-up.

== Stadium ==
Coordinates	Location	Stadium	Capacity	Year
14°19′59″N 100°24′17″E	Ayutthaya	Senabodee Stadium	2,500	2016
14°21′00″N 100°35′50″E	Ayutthaya	Ayutthaya Province Stadium	6,000	2017–present

== Season by season record ==
Season	League									FA Cup	League Cup	Top goalscorer	
Season	Division	P	W	D	L	F	A	Pts	Pos	FA Cup	League Cup	Name	Goals
2016	Central	20	8	7	5	19	15	31	4th	Opted out	R1	(Japan) Tomohiro Onodera	4
2017	T3 Upper	26	14	5	7	40	26	47	4th	R2	R1	(Trinidad and Tobago) Kendall Jagdeosingh	12
2018	T3 Upper	26	16	6	4	49	23	54	2nd	QR	QRP	(Brazil) Osvaldo Neto	15
2019	T2	34	5	9	20	37	64	24	18th	Opted out	R1	(South Korea) Jeong Woo-geun	8
2020–21	T2	34	13	8	13	46	45	47	9th	Opted out	–	(South Korea) Yoo Byung-soo	20
2021–22	T2	34	10	11	13	40	50	41	11th	QR	Opted out	(Thailand) Sarayut Yooseubchuea	6
2022–23	T2	34	15	6	13	50	43	51	10th	R3	R2	(Brazil) Nilson	18
2023–24	T2	34	16	9	9	52	36	59	6th	Opted out	Opted out	(Brazil) André Luís	13
2024–25	T2	34	17	9	6	57	30	60	2nd	R1	Opted out	(Brazil) Caíque	21
2025–26	T1	30	8	8	14	34	50	32	10th	SF	R2	(Brazil) Caíque	5

Champion	Runner	Promoted	Relegated

- P = Played
- W = Games won
- D = Games drawn
- L = Games lost
- F = Goals for
- A = Goals against
- Pts = Points
- Pos = Final position
- T1 = Thai League 1
- T2 = Thai League 2
- T3 = Thai League 3
- QR1 = First Qualifying Round
- QR2 = Second Qualifying Round
- QR3 = Third Qualifying Round
- QR4 = Fourth Qualifying Round
- RInt = Intermediate Round
- R1 = Round 1
- R2 = Round 2
- R3 = Round 3
- R4 = Round 4
- R5 = Round 5
- R6 = Round 6
- GR = Group stage
- QF = Quarter-finals
- SF = Semi-finals
- RU = Runners-up
- S = Shared
- W = Winners
- DIS = Disqualified

== Players ==
=== Current squad ===
Note: Flags indicate national team as defined under FIFA eligibility rules; some limited exceptions apply. Players may hold more than one non-FIFA nationality.

No.	Pos.	Nation	Player
1	GK	THA	Warut Mekmusik
2	DF	KOR	Hwang Hyun-soo
4	MF	BIH	Kerim Palić
5	DF	THA	Atsadawut Changthong
6	MF	BRA	Ewerton
7	FW	BRA	Lucas Dias
8	MF	THA	Nattapon Worasut
9	FW	BRA	Willen Mota
10	MF	THA	Chanukun Karin (on loan from Port)
11	FW	THA	Kritsana Kasemkulvilai
13	MF	THA	Anucha Sakaekum
14	MF	JPN	Hirotaka Mita
15	DF	SRB	Dejan Kerkez
16	DF	THA	Pichitchai Sienkrathok (on loan from Port)

No.	Pos.	Nation	Player
17	MF	THA	Chakkit Laptrakul
23	FW	THA	Pasakorn Biawtungnoi (on loan from Bangkok United)
25	FW	JPN	Yuki Kusano
26	DF	THA	Worawut Sataporn
27	GK	THA	Teerath Nakchamnarn
28	MF	THA	Natcha Promsomboon (on loan from Bangkok United)
29	MF	THA	Sanrawat Dechmitr
34	MF	THA	Veeraphong Aon-pean
36	DF	POR	Diogo Araújo
47	DF	THA	Bhumchanok Kamkla (on loan from Bangkok United)
50	DF	THA	Chatnipat Janpong
55	DF	THA	Sarayut Sompim
77	FW	BRA	Caíque Lemes
97	FW	THA	Guntapon Keereeleang (on loan from Bangkok United)

=== Out on loan ===
Note: Flags indicate national team as defined under FIFA eligibility rules; some limited exceptions apply. Players may hold more than one non-FIFA nationality.

No.	Pos.	Nation	Player
14	DF	THA	Kittichai Yaidee (at (Thailand) Khon Kaen United)

== Managerial history ==
Head coaches throughout years (2015–present)

Name	Period	Honours
Rachan Sarakom	2015–May 2016	Regional League Division 2 promotion
Aphirak Sriarun	May 2016–Dec 2016	Thai League 3 promotion
Sombat Kongplik	Dec 2016–Apr 2017	
Aphirak Sriarun (interim)	May 2017	
Narongthanaphorn Choeithaisongchodok	May 2017–Nov 2017	
Masayuki Miura	Dec 2017–Aug 2018	Thai League 2 promotion
Santi Chaiyaphuak (interim)	Aug–Sep 2018	
Chalermwoot Sa-ngapol	Nov 2018–Mar 2019	
Anurak Srikerd	Apr 2019–Jul 2019	
Pattanapong Sripramote (interim)	Aug 2019–Sep 2019	
Santi Chaiyaphuak	Jan 2020–Apr 2021	
Jetsada Jitsawad	Aug 2021–May 2022	
Santi Chaiyaphuak	July 2022–Feb 2023	
Bruno Pereira	Feb–May 2023	
Danny Invincibile	Jul 2023–May 2024	
Jugkrit Siriwattanasart	Aug 2024–present	Thai League 1 promotion

== Honours ==
=== Domestic ===
- Thai League 2
  - Runners-up (1): 2024–25
