= Khon Kaen Provincial Administrative Organization Stadium =

Sports venue in Khon Kaen Province, Thailand

- สนาม อบจ.ขอนแก่น (Thai)
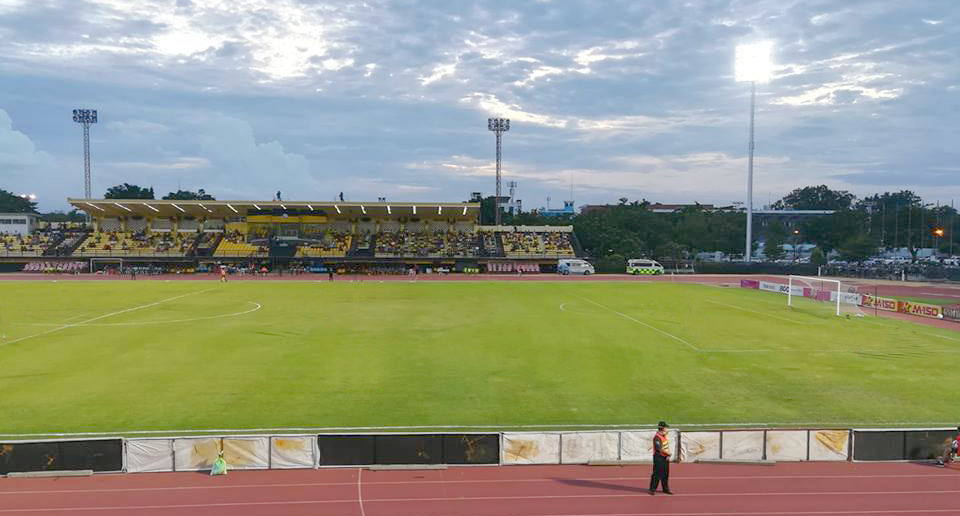
- Interactive map of Khon Kaen Provincial Administrative Organization Stadium
- Location: Khon Kaen, Thailand
- Coordinates: 16°24′46″N 102°49′38″E
- Owner: Khon Kaen Provincial Administrative
- Operator: Khon Kaen Provincial Administrative
- Capacity: 7,000
- Surface: Grass
- Public transit: Khon Kaen LRT: at Charoen Si Intersection Station (from 2022)

Tenants
- Khon Kaen FC; Khon Kaen United (2016-present)

Khon Kaen Provincial Administrative Organization Stadium (Thai: สนาม อบจ.ขอนแก่น) is a multi-purpose stadium in Khon Kaen Province, Thailand. It is currently used mostly for football matches and is the home stadium of Khon Kaen FC and Khon Kaen United. The stadium holds 7,000 people.
