= 2026–27 Thai League 3 Southern Region =

Thai League 3 Southern Region
- Season: 2026–27
- Dates: 19 September 2026 – 21 March 2027

The 2026–27 Thai League 3 Southern Region was part of the 2026–27 Thai League 3 Regional Stage, consisting of 10 clubs located in the southern region of Thailand. The season commenced on 19 September 2026, with clubs competing in a round-robin format featuring home-and-away matches. The Regional Stage concluded on 21 March 2027, with the top two clubs advancing to the National Championship Stage, while the bottom-placed club was relegated to the Thailand Semi-pro League for the following season.

== Seasonal Changes ==
The 2026–27 Thai League 3 Southern Region retains 10 clubs, unchanged from the previous season. BYD Auto remains the title sponsor, with matches broadcast on AIS Play. The criteria for determining the standings have also been revised, with overall goal difference replacing head-to-head results as the primary tiebreaker.

=== Relegation from Thai League 2 ===
Nakhon Si United was relegated to the 2026–27 Thai League 3 Southern Region after finishing second-bottom of the 2025–26 Thai League 2.

=== Promotions from Thailand Semi-pro League ===
The following two clubs were promoted from the 2026 Thailand Semi-pro League to the 2026–27 Thai League 3 Southern Region:

- Nara – promoted as regional champions.
- Yala City – promoted as runners-up under a special quota.

=== Promotion to Thai League 2 ===
PT Satun was promoted to the 2026–27 Thai League 2 as the third-place of the 2025–26 Thai League 3 National Championship Stage.

=== Relegation to Thailand Semi-pro League ===
The following two clubs were relegated from the 2025–26 Thai League 3 Southern Region to the 2027 Thailand Semi-pro League:

- Nara United, the Southern Region champions and national champions of the 2025–26 Thai League 3, failed to obtain a Thai League 2 club licence after qualifying for promotion. The club also failed to obtain a Thai League 3 club licence and was therefore ineligible to participate in either professional division, resulting in its relegation to the Thailand Semi-pro League.
- Krabi was relegated to the 2027 Thailand Semi-pro League after finishing bottom of the 2025–26 Thai League 3 Southern Region.

=== Club name and logo changes ===
Ranong United was renamed Ranong PJ United, with "PJ" added between "RANONG" and "UTD" on the club logo.

== Teams ==
=== Number of teams by province ===
| Position | Province | Number | Teams |
|---|---|---|---|
| 1 | Surat Thani | 2 | PSU Surat Thani City and Samui United |
| 1 | Yala | 2 | Yala and Yala City |
| 3 | Chumphon | 1 | Chumphon United |
| 3 | Nakhon Si Thammarat | 1 | Nakhon Si United |
| 3 | Narathiwat | 1 | Nara |
| 3 | Phuket | 1 | Phuket Andaman |
| 3 | Ranong | 1 | Ranong PJ United |
| 3 | Trang | 1 | Muang Trang United |

=== Stadiums and locations ===
| Team | Location | Stadium | Coordinates |
|---|---|---|---|
| Chumphon United | Chumphon (Mueang) | Stadium of Thailand National Sports University, Chumphon Campus | 10°27′23″N 99°07′45″E |
| Muang Trang United | Trang (Huai Yot) | Muang Trang Stadium | 7°48′08″N 99°35′18″E |
| Nakhon Si United | Nakhon Si Thammarat (Mueang) | Nakhon Si Thammarat Provincial Stadium | 8°27′17″N 99°57′31″E |
| Nara | Narathiwat (Mueang) | Narathiwat PAO Stadium | 6°25′31″N 101°48′23″E |
| Phuket Andaman | Phuket (Mueang) | Surakul Stadium | 7°53′20″N 98°22′19″E |
| PSU Surat Thani City | Surat Thani (Mueang) | Stadium of Prince of Songkla University, Surat Thani Campus | 9°05′39″N 99°21′32″E |
| Ranong PJ United | Ranong (Mueang) | Ranong Provincial Stadium | 9°57′35″N 98°38′25″E |
| Samui United | Surat Thani (Ko Samui) | Ko Samui Municipal International Stadium | 9°26′06″N 100°00′27″E |
| Yala | Yala (Mueang) | Stadium of Yala Rajabhat University | 6°33′03″N 101°17′30″E |
| Yala City | Yala (Mueang) | Stadium of Thailand National Sports University, Yala Campus | 6°33′09″N 101°17′31″E |

=== Foreign players ===
A T3 team can register 3 foreign players from around the world. A team can field 3 foreign players in each game.

== League table ==
=== Standings ===
| Pos | Team | Pld | W | D | L | GF | GA | GD | Pts | Qualification or relegation |
|---|---|---|---|---|---|---|---|---|---|---|
| 1 | Samui United | 8 | 6 | 0 | 2 | 15 | 6 | +9 | 18 | Qualification to the National Championship stage |
| 2 | PSU Surat Thani City | 8 | 5 | 3 | 0 | 8 | 2 | +6 | 18 | Qualification to the National Championship stage |
| 3 | Muang Trang United | 8 | 3 | 4 | 1 | 11 | 7 | +4 | 13 | |
| 4 | Yala City | 8 | 4 | 0 | 4 | 8 | 9 | −1 | 12 | |
| 5 | Phuket Andaman | 8 | 3 | 3 | 2 | 6 | 7 | −1 | 12 | |
| 6 | Nakhon Si United | 8 | 3 | 2 | 3 | 12 | 10 | +2 | 11 | |
| 7 | Nara | 8 | 3 | 2 | 3 | 8 | 7 | +1 | 11 | |
| 8 | Yala | 8 | 2 | 2 | 4 | 7 | 11 | −4 | 8 | |
| 9 | Ranong PJ United | 8 | 1 | 2 | 5 | 7 | 12 | −5 | 5 | |
| 10 | Chumphon United | 8 | 0 | 2 | 6 | 5 | 16 | −11 | 2 | Relegation to the Thailand Semi-pro League |

Updated to match(es) played on 8 November 2026. Source: Thai League
Rules for classification: 1) Points; 2) Overall goal difference; 3) Overall goals scored; 4) Head-to-head points; 5) Head-to-head goal difference; 6) Head-to-head goals scored; 7) Fair play points.

=== Positions by round ===
| Team ╲ Round | 1 | 2 | 3 | 4 | 5 | 6 | 7 | 8 | 9 | 10 | 11 | 12 | 13 | 14 | 15 | 16 | 17 | 18 |
|---|---|---|---|---|---|---|---|---|---|---|---|---|---|---|---|---|---|---|
| Samui United | 1 | 1 | 2 | 2 | 1 | 1 | 1 | 1 | | | | | | | | | | |
| PSU Surat Thani City | 8 | 3 | 1 | 1 | 2 | 2 | 2 | 2 | | | | | | | | | | |
| Muang Trang United | 5 | 6 | 6 | 4 | 3 | 4 | 3 | 3 | | | | | | | | | | |
| Yala City | 2 | 5 | 7 | 7 | 5 | 5 | 6 | 4 | | | | | | | | | | |
| Phuket Andaman | 7 | 7 | 5 | 5 | 6 | 8 | 5 | 5 | | | | | | | | | | |
| Nakhon Si United | 3 | 2 | 3 | 3 | 4 | 3 | 4 | 6 | | | | | | | | | | |
| Nara | 6 | 8 | 8 | 8 | 7 | 6 | 7 | 7 | | | | | | | | | | |
| Yala | 4 | 4 | 4 | 6 | 8 | 7 | 8 | 8 | | | | | | | | | | |
| Ranong PJ United | 10 | 9 | 9 | 10 | 9 | 9 | 9 | 9 | | | | | | | | | | |
| Chumphon United | 9 | 10 | 10 | 9 | 10 | 10 | 10 | 10 | | | | | | | | | | |

Source: Thai League
= Qualification to the National Championship stage; = Relegation to the Thailand Semi-pro League

=== Results by round ===
| Team ╲ Round | 1 | 2 | 3 | 4 | 5 | 6 | 7 | 8 | 9 | 10 | 11 | 12 | 13 | 14 | 15 | 16 | 17 | 18 |
|---|---|---|---|---|---|---|---|---|---|---|---|---|---|---|---|---|---|---|
| Samui United | W | W | L | W | W | L | W | W | | | | | | | | | | |
| PSU Surat Thani City | D | W | W | W | D | D | W | W | | | | | | | | | | |
| Muang Trang United | D | D | D | W | W | D | W | L | | | | | | | | | | |
| Yala City | W | L | L | L | W | W | L | W | | | | | | | | | | |
| Phuket Andaman | D | D | W | D | L | L | W | W | | | | | | | | | | |
| Nakhon Si United | D | W | D | W | L | W | L | L | | | | | | | | | | |
| Nara | D | L | D | L | W | W | L | W | | | | | | | | | | |
| Yala | D | W | D | L | L | W | L | L | | | | | | | | | | |
| Ranong PJ United | L | L | D | L | D | L | W | L | | | | | | | | | | |
| Chumphon United | L | L | D | D | L | L | L | L | | | | | | | | | | |

Source: Thai League
W = Won; D = Drawn; L = Lost

=== Results ===
| Home \ Away | CPU | MTG | NSU | NRA | PKA | STC | RNU | SMU | YLA | YLC |
|---|---|---|---|---|---|---|---|---|---|---|
| Chumphon United | — | 1–1 | | 1–3 | | 1–2 | | 0–1 | | 1–2 |
| Muang Trang United | | — | | | 0–0 | | 2–0 | | | 4–0 |
| Nakhon Si United | 5–0 | 0–2 | — | | | 1–2 | | | | 1–0 |
| Nara | | 0–0 | 3–1 | — | 2–0 | | | 0–1 | | |
| Phuket Andaman | 0–0 | | | | — | 0–0 | 3–2 | | 1–0 | |
| PSU Surat Thani City | | 0–0 | | 2–0 | | — | | | 1–0 | |
| Ranong PJ United | | | 1–1 | 2–0 | | 0–0 | — | | 1–2 | |
| Samui United | | 6–2 | 0–1 | | 1–2 | | 2–0 | — | 3–1 | |
| Yala | 2–1 | | 2–2 | 0–0 | | | | | — | 0–2 |
| Yala City | | | | | 2–0 | 0–1 | 2–1 | 0–1 | | — |

Updated to match(es) played on 8 November 2026. Source: Thai League
Legend: Blue = home team win; Yellow = draw; Red = away team win.
For upcoming matches, an "a" indicates there is an article about the rivalry between the two participants.
