= Nattapong Phephat =

Thai footballer (born 1995)

Personal information
- Full name: Nattapong Phephat
- Date of birth: 13 November 1995 (age 30)
- Place of birth: Songkhla, Thailand
- Height: 1.80 m (5 ft 11 in)
- Position: Left-back

Team information
- Current team: Nara United
- Number: 2

Youth career
- 2010–2014: Songkhla United

Senior career*
| Years | Team | Apps | (Gls) |
| 2015–2017 | Songkhla United | 34 | (2) |
| 2017–2020 | Chonburi | 14 | (0) |
| 2021 | Suphanburi | 6 | (0) |
| 2021 | Nongbua Pitchaya | 0 | (0) |
| 2021–2022 | MH Khon Surat City | 18 | (0) |
| 2022–2023 | Samut Prakan City | 13 | (0) |
| 2025 | Saraburi United | 5 | (0) |
| 2026– | Nara United | 6 | (0) |

International career
| 2015 | Thailand U19 | 2 | (0) |
- * Club domestic league appearances and goals as of 30 April 2023

Nattapong Phephat (Thai: ณัฐพงศ์ เปพาทย์; born 13 November 1995) is a Thai professional footballer who plays as a left-back.

== Honours ==
=== Player ===
Nara United

- Thai League 3: 2025–26
- Thai League 3 Southern Region: 2025–26
