= Nara F.C. =

Nara นรา
- Full name: Nara Football Club
- Nicknames: The White Doves (พิราบขาว)
- Founded: 2026; 0 years ago
- Ground: Narathiwat PAO. Stadium; Narathiwat, Thailand
- Capacity: 5,000
- Coordinates: 6°25′31″N 101°48′23″E
- Owner(s): Samosonfootball Nara FC 2026 Co., Ltd.
- Chairman: Faisal Awae
- Head coach: Wasan Sungkhaphan
- League: Thai League 3
- 2026: Thailand Semi-pro League, 1st of 6 in the Southern region
- Website: Facebook

Nara Football Club (Thai: สโมสรฟุตบอล นรา), is a Thai professional football club based in Narathiwat, Thailand. The club currently competes in the Thai League 3, the third tier of the Thai football league system, and plays in the Southern region.

== History ==
Nara Football Club was established in 2026. Its operating entity, Samosonfootball Nara FC 2026 Company Limited, was registered on 16 February 2026, with the stated purpose of establishing and managing a football club for domestic and international competitions. The club entered the Thailand Semi-pro League in 2026 and competed in the Southern region. Nara won the regional championship after finishing the six-match campaign with four wins, one draw and one defeat, scoring 11 goals and conceding five. The title earned the club a place in the Thai League 3 for the 2026–27 season, subject to club licensing. On 11 July 2026, Nara obtained a club licence from the Football Association of Thailand to compete in the 2026–27 Thai League 3 season. The club thus began its first season in the professional league system as a newly promoted Southern region side. On 13 July 2026, Nara FC appointed Adilan Ayuya as its executive chairman. Ahead of its debut season in Thai League 3, Nara appointed Wasan Sangphan, known as "Coach Liap", as head coach on 24 July 2026. Sangphan had previously guided Nara United F.C. to the Thai League 3 national championship in the 2025–26 season. Ahead of their inaugural season in Thai League 3, Nara FC announced 2S Sports as the club's official kit supplier.

== Stadium and locations ==
Coordinates	Location	Stadium	Year
6°25′31″N 101°48′23″E	Mueang, Narathiwat	Narathiwat PAO. Stadium	2026 – present

== Season by season record ==
Season	League									FA Cup	League Cup	T3 Cup	Top goalscorer	
Season	Division	P	W	D	L	F	A	Pts	Pos	FA Cup	League Cup	T3 Cup	Name	Goals
2026	TS South	6	4	1	1	11	5	13	1st	Opted out	Ineligible	Ineligible	(Thailand) Marwan Yakoh, (Thailand) Natthapong Maneesawang	3
2026–27	T3 South													

Champions	Runners-up	Promoted	Relegated

- P = Played
- W = Games won
- D = Games drawn
- L = Games lost
- F = Goals for
- A = Goals against
- Pts = Points
- Pos = Final position
- QR1 = First Qualifying Round
- QR2 = Second Qualifying Round
- R1 = Round 1
- R2 = Round 2
- R3 = Round 3
- R4 = Round 4
- R5 = Round 5
- R6 = Round 6
- QF = Quarter-finals
- SF = Semi-finals
- RU = Runners-up
- W = Winners

== Players ==
=== Current squad ===
As of

Note: Flags indicate national team as defined under FIFA eligibility rules; some limited exceptions apply. Players may hold more than one non-FIFA nationality.

No. / Pos. / Nation / Player	No. / Pos. / Nation / Player
