= 2025–26 Thai League 3 Southern Region =

Thai League 3 Southern Region
- Season: 2025–26
- Dates: 13 September 2025 – 21 March 2026
- Champions: Nara United
- Relegated: Krabi
- T3 National Championship: Nara United; PT Satun
- Matches: 90
- Goals: 242 (2.69 per match)
- Top goalscorer: (Brazil) Jhonatan Bernardo (13 goals; Yala 3, Samui United 10)
- Best goalkeeper: (Thailand) Wuttichai Panboot (9 clean sheets; PT Satun)
- Biggest home win: 9 goals difference Samui United 9–0 Krabi (7 March 2026)
- Biggest away win: 5 goals difference Krabi 0–5 Muang Trang United (21 February 2026)
- Highest scoring: 9 goals Samui United 9–0 Krabi (7 March 2026)
- Longest winning run: 6 matches Nara United
- Longest unbeaten run: 8 matches Yala
- Longest winless run: 18 matches Krabi
- Longest losing run: 10 matches Krabi
- Highest attendance: 3,700; Nara United 2–1 PT Satun (17 January 2026)
- Lowest attendance: 0 Nara United 5–1 Chumphon United (2 November 2025)
- Total attendance: 75,243
- Average attendance: 836

The 2025–26 Thai League 3 Southern Region was part of the 2025–26 Thai League 3 Regional Stage, consisting of 10 clubs located in the southern region of Thailand. The season commenced on 13 September 2025, with clubs competing in a round-robin format featuring home-and-away matches. The Regional Stage concluded on 21 March 2026, with the top two clubs advancing to the National Championship Stage, while the bottom-placed club was relegated to the Thailand Semi-pro League for the following season.

== Seasonal Changes ==
The 2025–26 Thai League 3 season features a number of changes compared to the previous campaign. These include the promotion and relegation of clubs between divisions, several club renamings and rebrandings, and the introduction of a new title sponsor, BYD Auto, which rebranded the competition as the BYD Dolphin League III for sponsorship reasons.

=== Promotions from Thailand Semi-pro League ===
Normally, the champions of each of the six regional groups of the 2025 Thailand Semi-pro League would be promoted to the Thai League 3. However, in the Western region, the champions, The Wall, failed club licensing and were denied promotion. As a result, only five regional champions earned direct promotion, with several additional clubs promoted under special quotas due to licensing issues and adjustments to balance the number of teams in each group. Clubs promotion in the Southern region:

- Samui United – promoted as regional champions.
- Chumphon United – promoted as runners-up under a special quota, after Songkhla and Pattani were promoted to Thai League 2, and Phatthalung failed licensing, leaving three vacancies in the group.

=== Promotion to Thai League 2 ===
Songkhla and Pattani achieved promotion to Thai League 2, having finished as the national runners-up and third place, respectively. Both clubs will be missed in this region, where they were top performers.

=== Club relegated due to club licensing failures ===
In addition to the regular relegations, one club was demoted from the Thai League 3 Southern region after failing to obtain a club licensing certificate for the 2025–26 season.

- Phatthalung – failed licensing and were relegated.

=== Club relegated due to finishing last in the region ===
Alongside the licensing-related relegations, one club was demoted from the Thai League 3 Southern region after finishing at the bottom of the respective regional leagues in the 2024–25 season.

- Yala City – relegated after finishing bottom in the Southern standings.

=== Sponsorship and Broadcasting ===
In the 2025–26 season, Thai League 3 will operate under a title sponsorship arrangement for the first time: BYD Auto (through BYD Rêver Thailand) has become the main sponsor for all three professional tiers in Thailand, including Thai League 3, rebranding it as the BYD Dolphin League III.

On the broadcasting side, a landmark media rights deal was struck, giving AIS Play (in partnership with Gulf and JAS) exclusive rights to stream all matches from Thai Leagues 1, 2, and 3, plus domestic cups and youth competitions for the 2025–26 through 2028–29 seasons. Under this agreement, Thai League 3 matches can be watched live for free via AIS Play, and fans will no longer rely solely on individual clubs' streaming efforts (e.g., via YouTube or Facebook), as they did in previous seasons.

=== Club name and logo changes ===
2 clubs have changed their logo for the 2025–26 season of the Thai League 3 Southern region:

- Chumphon United, a newly promoted club from the Thailand Semi-pro League, has updated its logo by adopting a more dimensional appearance.
- PT Satun changed their logo by adding text "PT" into the club's logo and renamed to "PT Satun".

== Teams ==
=== Number of teams by province ===
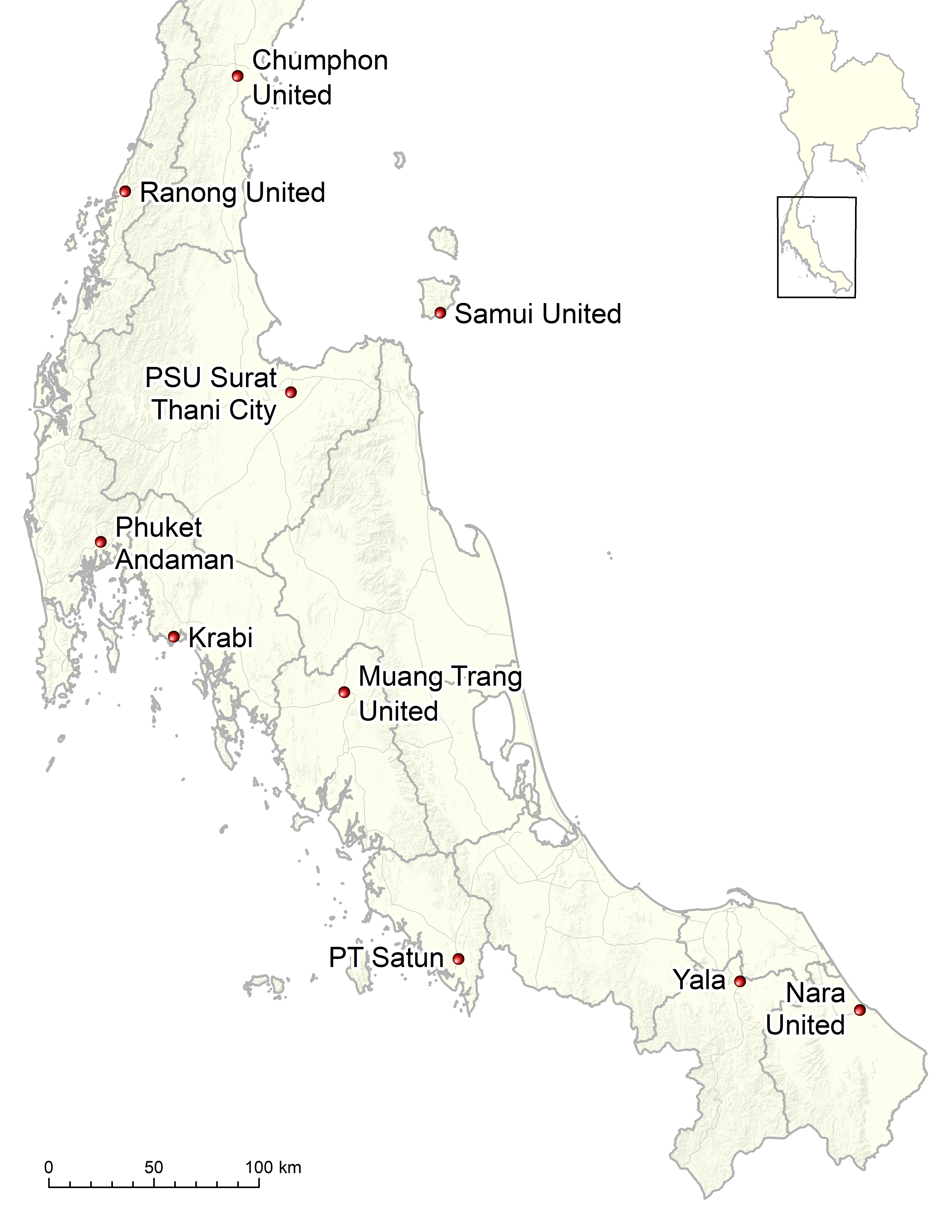
Locations of the 2025–26 Thai League 3 Southern Region clubs.

| Position | Province | Number | Teams |
|---|---|---|---|
| 1 | Surat Thani | 2 | PSU Surat Thani City and Samui United |
| 2 | Chumphon | 1 | Chumphon United |
| 2 | Krabi | 1 | Krabi |
| 2 | Narathiwat | 1 | Nara United |
| 2 | Phang Nga | 1 | Phuket Andaman |
| 2 | Ranong | 1 | Ranong United |
| 2 | Satun | 1 | PT Satun |
| 2 | Trang | 1 | Muang Trang United |
| 2 | Yala | 1 | Yala |

=== Stadiums and locations ===
| Team | Location | Stadium | Coordinates |
|---|---|---|---|
| Chumphon United | Chumphon (Mueang) | Stadium of Thailand National Sports University, Chumphon Campus | 10°27′23″N 99°07′45″E |
| Krabi | Krabi (Mueang) | Plabai Stadium | 8°02′30″N 98°51′07″E |
| Muang Trang United | Trang (Huai Yot) | Muang Trang Stadium | 7°48′08″N 99°35′18″E |
| Nara United | Narathiwat (Mueang) | Narathiwat PAO. Stadium | 6°25′31″N 101°48′23″E |
| Phuket Andaman | Phang Nga (Mueang) | Phang Nga Provincial Stadium | 8°26′59″N 98°32′09″E |
| PSU Surat Thani City | Surat Thani (Mueang) | Stadium of Prince of Songkla University, Surat Thani Campus | 9°05′39″N 99°21′32″E |
| PT Satun | Satun (Mueang) | Satun PAO. Stadium | 6°39′05″N 100°04′44″E |
| Ranong United | Ranong (Mueang) | Ranong Provincial Stadium | 9°57′35″N 98°38′25″E |
| Samui United | Surat Thani (Ko Samui) | Ko Samui City Municipality International Stadium | 9°26′06″N 100°00′27″E |
| Yala | Yala (Mueang) | Stadium of Yala Rajabhat University | 6°33′03″N 101°17′30″E |

=== Foreign players ===
A T3 team could register 3 foreign players from foreign players all around the world. A team can use 3 foreign players on the field in each game.

Note :
(substituted off) : players who released during second leg transfer window;
(substituted on) : players who registered during second leg transfer window.

| AFC member countries players. |
| CAF member countries players. |
| CONCACAF member countries players. |
| CONMEBOL member countries players. |
| OFC member countries players. |
| UEFA member countries players. |
| No foreign player registered. |

| Club | Leg | Player 1 | Player 2 | Player 3 |
|---|---|---|---|---|
| Chumphon United | 1st | (Nigeria) Emmanue Larinze Ojemuyide (substituted off) | (South Korea) Kim Ye-sung (substituted off) | (Japan) Ryohei Maeda |
| Chumphon United | 2nd | (Ivory Coast) Mohamed Junior Diomandé (substituted on) | (United States) Christian Joseph Sacchini (substituted on) | (Japan) Ryohei Maeda |
| Krabi | 1st | (Argentina) Joaquín Sebastián Romero | (Argentina) Lucas Daniel Echenique | (Northern Ireland) Nicholas Demetri |
| Krabi | 2nd | (Argentina) Joaquín Sebastián Romero | (Argentina) Lucas Daniel Echenique | (Northern Ireland) Nicholas Demetri |
| Muang Trang United | 1st | (Brazil) Carlos Damian dos Santos Puentes | (Brazil) Edson dos Santos Costa Júnior | (Brazil) Romário Reginaldo Alves |
| Muang Trang United | 2nd | (Brazil) Carlos Damian dos Santos Puentes | (Brazil) Edson dos Santos Costa Júnior | (Brazil) Romário Reginaldo Alves |
| Nara United | 1st | (Japan) Takuya Fushimi (substituted off) | (Brazil) Pedro Lucas Jesus Paixão Martins | (Brazil) Lucas Grossi de Araújo Reis |
| Nara United | 2nd | (Curaçao) Elson Hooi (substituted on) | (Brazil) Pedro Lucas Jesus Paixão Martins | (Brazil) Lucas Grossi de Araújo Reis |
| Phuket Andaman | 1st | | (Ivory Coast) Coulibaly Chomana | (Ivory Coast) Mohamed Kouadio |
| Phuket Andaman | 2nd | (Brazil) Nickolas Gabriel Wanderley Rocha (substituted on) | (Ivory Coast) Coulibaly Chomana | (Ivory Coast) Mohamed Kouadio |
| PSU Surat Thani City | 1st | (Brazil) Osvaldo Nascimento dos Santos Neto (substituted off) | (Brazil) Josimar Tiago da Silva | (Mali) Toloba Aremu Kassim Mouyidine |
| PSU Surat Thani City | 2nd | (South Korea) Kwon Hyuk (substituted on) | (Brazil) Josimar Tiago da Silva | (Mali) Toloba Aremu Kassim Mouyidine |
| PT Satun | 1st | (Brazil) Mairon Natan Pereira Maciel Oliveira (substituted off) | (Brazil) Lucas Gaudencio Moraes (substituted off) | (Brazil) Caio da Conceição Silva |
| PT Satun | 2nd | (Brazil) Wellerson da Silva Machado Guimarães (substituted on) | (Brazil) Bruno Garcia Marcate (substituted on) | (Brazil) Caio da Conceição Silva |
| Ranong United | 1st |
| Ranong United | 2nd | (France) Drame Lassana Ibraime (substituted on) | (Japan) Tsubasa Kawanishi (substituted on) | (Japan) Shunto Watanabe (substituted on) |
| Samui United | 1st | (Brazil) Lucas Massaro Garcia Gama (substituted off) | (Wales) Tommy O'Sullivan | (Nigeria) Aliu Micheal Abdul |
| Samui United | 2nd | (Brazil) Jhonatan Bernardo (substituted on) | (Wales) Tommy O'Sullivan | (Nigeria) Aliu Micheal Abdul |
| Yala | 1st | (Brazil) Jhonatan Bernardo (substituted off) | (Brazil) Felipe Micael (substituted off) | (Laos) Mitsada Saitaifah |
| Yala | 2nd | (Brazil) Mairon Natan Pereira Maciel Oliveira (substituted on) | (Sweden) Alexandar Mutic (substituted on) | (Laos) Mitsada Saitaifah |

== League table ==
=== Standings ===
| Pos | Team | Pld | W | D | L | GF | GA | GD | Pts | Qualification or relegation |
|---|---|---|---|---|---|---|---|---|---|---|
| 1 | Nara United (C, Q) | 18 | 14 | 1 | 3 | 39 | 10 | +29 | 43 | Qualification to the National Championship stage |
| 2 | PT Satun (Q) | 18 | 11 | 4 | 3 | 31 | 11 | +20 | 37 | Qualification to the National Championship stage |
| 3 | Yala | 18 | 10 | 6 | 2 | 28 | 14 | +14 | 36 | |
| 4 | Samui United | 18 | 10 | 3 | 5 | 37 | 16 | +21 | 33 | |
| 5 | PSU Surat Thani City | 18 | 8 | 7 | 3 | 29 | 24 | +5 | 31 | |
| 6 | Muang Trang United | 18 | 7 | 5 | 6 | 32 | 24 | +8 | 26 | |
| 7 | Phuket Andaman | 18 | 6 | 5 | 7 | 24 | 21 | +3 | 23 | |
| 8 | Chumphon United | 18 | 2 | 4 | 12 | 11 | 34 | −23 | 10 (Note: The head-to-head record is tied; Chumphon United 2 pts (GD 0, GF 1), Ranong United 2 pts (GD 0, GF 1). Chumphon United is ahead in the overall goals difference.) | |
| 9 | Ranong United | 18 | 2 | 4 | 12 | 10 | 36 | −26 | 10 | |
| 10 | Krabi (R) | 18 | 0 | 1 | 17 | 1 | 52 | −51 | 1 | Relegation to the Thailand Semi-pro League |

Source: Thai League
Rules for classification: 1) Points; 2) Head-to-head points; 3) Head-to-head goal difference; 4) Head-to-head goal scored; 5) Overall goal difference; 6) Overall goal scored; 7) Fair play points; 8) Play-off without extra time).
(C) Champions; (Q) Qualified for the phase indicated; (R) Relegated

=== Positions by round ===
| Team ╲ Round | 1 | 2 | 3 | 4 | 5 | 6 | 7 | 8 | 9 | 10 | 11 | 12 | 13 | 14 | 15 | 16 | 17 | 18 |
|---|---|---|---|---|---|---|---|---|---|---|---|---|---|---|---|---|---|---|
| Nara United | 7 | 3 | 2 | 1 | 1 | 1 | 1 | 1 | 1 | 1 | 1 | 1 | 1 | 1 | 1 | 1 | 1 | 1 |
| PT Satun | 2 | 2 | 5 | 4 | 2 | 3 | 5 | 3 | 3 | 3 | 4 | 2 | 2 | 2 | 4 | 4 | 2 | 2 |
| Yala | 8 | 8 | 9 | 9 | 7 | 6 | 2 | 4 | 2 | 4 | 5 | 3 | 3 | 3 | 2 | 3 | 4 | 3 |
| Samui United | 6 | 1 | 1 | 3 | 5 | 5 | 3 | 2 | 4 | 2 | 2 | 5 | 4 | 4 | 3 | 2 | 3 | 4 |
| PSU Surat Thani City | 4 | 7 | 4 | 2 | 4 | 2 | 4 | 5 | 7 | 6 | 6 | 6 | 6 | 5 | 5 | 6 | 5 | 5 |
| Muang Trang United | 1 | 5 | 7 | 6 | 6 | 7 | 7 | 6 | 6 | 7 | 7 | 7 | 7 | 7 | 6 | 5 | 6 | 6 |
| Phuket Andaman | 9 | 4 | 3 | 5 | 3 | 4 | 6 | 7 | 5 | 5 | 3 | 4 | 5 | 6 | 7 | 7 | 7 | 7 |
| Chumphon United | 3 | 6 | 8 | 8 | 9 | 9 | 9 | 9 | 8 | 8 | 8 | 8 | 9 | 9 | 9 | 9 | 8 | 8 |
| Ranong United | 5 | 9 | 6 | 7 | 8 | 8 | 8 | 8 | 9 | 9 | 9 | 9 | 8 | 8 | 8 | 8 | 9 | 9 |
| Krabi | 10 | 10 | 10 | 10 | 10 | 10 | 10 | 10 | 10 | 10 | 10 | 10 | 10 | 10 | 10 | 10 | 10 | 10 |

Source: Thai League
= Qualification to the National Championship stage; = Relegation to the Thailand Semi-pro League

=== Results by round ===
| Team ╲ Round | 1 | 2 | 3 | 4 | 5 | 6 | 7 | 8 | 9 | 10 | 11 | 12 | 13 | 14 | 15 | 16 | 17 | 18 |
|---|---|---|---|---|---|---|---|---|---|---|---|---|---|---|---|---|---|---|
| Nara United | W | W | W | W | W | W | L | W | W | W | W | D | L | W | W | W | W | L |
| PT Satun | W | D | L | W | W | D | D | W | D | W | L | W | W | W | L | W | W | W |
| Yala | D | L | D | W | W | W | W | D | W | L | D | W | W | W | W | D | D | W |
| Samui United | D | W | W | L | L | W | W | W | L | W | D | L | W | W | W | W | D | L |
| PSU Surat Thani City | D | D | W | W | D | W | D | L | L | W | D | W | D | D | W | L | W | W |
| Muang Trang United | W | L | L | W | D | L | W | W | D | L | D | W | D | L | W | W | L | D |
| Phuket Andaman | L | W | W | L | W | D | L | D | W | W | W | D | L | L | L | D | L | D |
| Chumphon United | D | D | L | D | L | L | L | L | W | L | L | L | L | L | L | L | W | D |
| Ranong United | D | L | W | L | L | L | L | L | L | L | D | L | W | D | L | L | L | D |
| Krabi | L | L | L | L | L | L | L | L | L | L | D | L | L | L | L | L | L | L |

Source: Thai League
W = Won; D = Drawn; L = Lost

=== Results ===
| Home \ Away | CPU | KBI | MTG | NRA | PKA | STC | STN | RNU | SMU | YLA |
|---|---|---|---|---|---|---|---|---|---|---|
| Chumphon United | — | 2–0 | 0–4 | 0–2 | 0–1 | 2–2 | 0–4 | 1–1 | 0–1 | 0–0 |
| Krabi | 0–3 | — | 0–5 | 0–4 | 0–2 | 0–1 | 0–2 | 0–1 | 0–3 | 0–3 |
| Muang Trang United | 2–0 | 2–1 | — | 2–3 | 3–1 | 1–1 | 0–2 | 4–1 | 1–3 | 0–1 |
| Nara United | 5–1 | 3–0 | 3–0 | — | 3–1 | 3–0 | 2–1 | 3–0 | 1–0 | 1–2 |
| Phuket Andaman | 2–0 | 3–0 | 1–1 | 0–0 | — | 3–1 | 0–0 | 3–0 | 0–1 | 2–2 |
| PSU Surat Thani City | 3–0 | 3–0 | 2–2 | 0–2 | 2–1 | — | 3–2 | 2–1 | 4–3 | 1–1 |
| PT Satun | 1–0 | 3–0 | 1–1 | 0–1 | 2–1 | 2–2 | — | 1–0 | 2–0 | 1–1 |
| Ranong United | 0–0 | 0–0 | 1–2 | 0–2 | 2–1 | 1–1 | 0–4 | — | 1–4 | 1–2 |
| Samui United | 3–0 | 9–0 | 0–0 | 2–1 | 3–1 | 0–0 | 0–2 | 4–0 | — | 0–2 |
| Yala | 3–2 | 3–0 | 3–2 | 1–0 | 1–1 | 0–1 | 0–1 | 2–0 | 1–1 | — |

Source: Thai League
Legend: Blue = home team win; Yellow = draw; Red = away team win.
For upcoming matches, an "a" indicates there is an article about the rivalry between the two participants.
