= Rakpong Chumuang =

Thai footballer (born 1992)

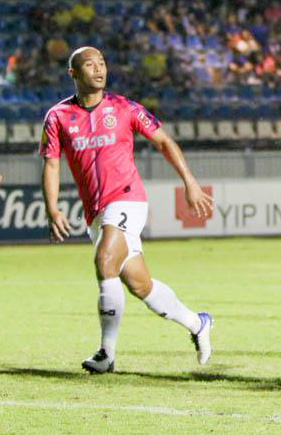
- Rakpong Chumuang playing for Nongbua Pitchaya.

Personal information
- Full name: Rakpong Chumuang
- Date of birth: 22 March 1992 (age 34)
- Place of birth: Bangkok, Thailand
- Height: 1.81 m (5 ft 11 in)
- Positions: Right back; center back

Team information
- Current team: Nara United
- Number: 17

Senior career*
Years	Team	Apps	(Gls)
2014–2015	Bangkok Glass		
2016	Bangkok		
2017	Khon Kaen		
2018–2019	Ubon UMT	29	(2)
2020–2023	Nongbua Pitchaya	50	(0)
2023–2024	Udon United	22	(1)
2024–2025	Lampang	27	(1)
2025–	Nara United	17	(0)
- * Club domestic league appearances and goals as of 1 June 2026

Rakpong Chumuang (Thai: รักษ์พงศ์ ชูเมือง;) (Nickname is Yuk) He is a Thai footballer who plays for Thai League 2 club Nara United as a Center back and right-back.

== Honour ==
Nongbua Pitchaya

- Thai League 2: 2020–21

Nara United

- Thai League 3: 2025–26
- Thai League 3 Southern Region: 2025–26
