= 2025–26 Thai League 3 =

9th season of the Thai League 3

- Season: 2025–26
- Dates: 13 September 2025 – 14 June 2026
- Champions: Nara United
- Promoted: Uttaradit; PT Satun; Muang Loei United
- Relegated: Nakhon Sawan See Khwae City; Saraburi United; Surin Khong Chee Mool; ACDC; Nonthaburi United; Krabi

The 2025–26 Thai League 3 was the ninth season of the Thai League 3, the third tier of professional football in Thailand. Organised by the Football Association of Thailand and Thai League Co., Ltd., the competition featured 68 clubs divided into six regional groups: Northern (12 clubs), Central (11 clubs), Northeastern (12 clubs), Eastern (12 clubs), Western (11 clubs), and Southern (10 clubs). For sponsorship purposes, the league was branded as the BYD DOLPHIN League III, named after the BYD Dolphin, an electric car model produced by Chinese automotive manufacturer BYD Auto.

The season began on 13 September 2025 and was contested in two stages. In the Regional Stage, clubs competed against other clubs within their respective regions in a round-robin format featuring home-and-away matches. The champions and runners-up from each region advanced to the National Championship Stage, which featured 12 clubs. The winners, runners-up, and winner of the third-place play-off were promoted to the Thai League 2 for the 2026–27 season.

== Seasonal Changes ==
The 2025–26 Thai League 3 season features a number of changes compared to the previous campaign. These include the promotion and relegation of clubs between divisions, several clubs renaming and rebranding, and the introduction of a new title sponsor, BYD Auto, which rebranded the competition as the BYD Dolphin League III for sponsorship reasons.

=== Relegation from Thai League 2 ===
Originally, three clubs were scheduled to be relegated from the 2024–25 Thai League 2 to the Thai League 3.

However, during the 2024–25 season, Samut Prakan City were expelled due to finances and folded; their record was expunged. At the end of the season, Lampang, who had finished fifth, also folded.

Accordingly, Pattaya United, who had originally finished in 16th out of the 17 remaining clubs, was reprieved from relegation.

Suphanburi, who finished last in the Thai League 2, were the only club relegated. They have been placed in the Western region of Thai League 3, in line with the location of their home ground in Western Thailand.

=== Promotions from Thailand Semi-pro League ===
Normally, the champions of each of the six regional groups of the 2025 Thailand Semi-pro League would be promoted to the Thai League 3. However, in the Western region, the champions, The Wall, failed club licensing and were denied promotion. As a result, only five regional champions earned direct promotion, with several additional clubs promoted under special quotas due to licensing issues and adjustments to balance the number of teams in each group.

Northern Region

- Phichit United – promoted as regional champions.
- Chiangrai TSC – promoted as runners-up under a special quota, increasing the Northern group from 11 to 12 clubs.

Central Region

- Singburi Warriors – promoted as regional champions.
- Futera United – admitted as third-placed team, after both AUU Inter Bangkok and Dome (Thai League 3 survivors) failed licensing, and runners-up Ayutthaya PK also failed licensing.

Northeastern Region

- Udon Banjan United – promoted as regional champions.
- EUMT – promoted as runners-up under a special quota, as the group expanded from 11 to 12 teams. In addition, relegated side Khon Kaen Mordindang were reprieved due to Rasisalai United's promotion to Thai League 2.

Eastern Region

- Banbueng City – promoted as regional champions, later renamed Burapha United.

Southern Region

- Samui United – promoted as regional champions.
- Chumphon United – promoted as runners-up under a special quota, after Songkhla and Pattani were promoted to Thai League 2, and Phatthalung failed licensing, leaving three vacancies in the group.

=== Promotion to Thai League 2 ===
The top three clubs from the 2024–25 Thai League 3 season have been promoted to Thai League 2: Rasisalai United (National champion), Songkhla (National runners-up), and Pattani (National third-place).

=== Clubs relegated due to club licensing failures ===
In addition to the regular relegations, four clubs were demoted from Thai League 3 after failing to obtain a club licensing certificate for the 2025–26 season.

- AUU Inter Bangkok (Central region) – failed licensing and were removed from the league.
- Dome (Central region) – withdrew from the league; as a consequence, Saraburi United, who finished bottom of the Central region table, retained their place in Thai League 3.
- Maraleina (Western region) – Withdrew from the league as the owner are part of Samui United.
- Phatthalung (Southern region) – failed licensing and were relegated.

As a result, these vacancies contributed to adjustments in the promotion and relegation process, ensuring each region maintained a balanced number of clubs for the 2025–26 season.

=== Clubs relegated due to finishing last in their regions ===
Alongside the licensing-related relegations, four clubs were demoted from Thai League 3 after finishing at the bottom of their respective regional leagues in the 2024–25 season.

- Phitsanulok Unity (Northern region) – relegated after finishing last in the Northern table.
- Samut Prakan (Eastern region) – relegated as the bottom-placed club in the Eastern region.
- Kanchanaburi City (Western region) – finished last in the Western region and were relegated.
- Yala City (Southern region) – relegated after finishing bottom in the Southern standings.

In the Central region, the lowest-placed side, Saraburi United, was spared relegation because AUU Inter Bangkok and Dome had already been demoted due to licensing failures. Meanwhile, in the Northeastern region, no club was relegated at all, as the bottom-placed side was allowed to remain for balance after Rasisalai United's promotion to Thai League 2.

=== Sponsorship and Broadcasting ===
In the 2025–26 season, Thai League 3 will operate under a title sponsorship arrangement for the first time: BYD Auto (through BYD Rêver Thailand) has become the main sponsor for all three professional tiers in Thailand, including Thai League 3, rebranding it as the BYD Dolphin League III.

On the broadcasting side, a landmark media rights deal was struck, giving AIS Play (in partnership with Gulf and JAS) exclusive rights to stream all matches from Thai Leagues 1, 2, and 3, plus domestic cups and youth competitions for the 2025–26 through 2028–29 seasons. Under this agreement, Thai League 3 matches can be watched live for free via AIS Play, and fans will no longer rely solely on individual clubs' streaming efforts (e.g., via YouTube or Facebook), as they did in previous seasons.

=== Club name and logo changes ===
Several clubs have rebranded or changed their logos for the 2025–26 season:

- Chiangmai (Northern region), introduced a new logo for the 2025–26 season. The previous crest, which featured a half-body tiger with the Three Kings above, was replaced by a modern design showing the metallic head of a roaring steel tiger next to a football, with the traditional Three Kings motif removed.
- Phichit United (Northern region), newly promoted from the Thailand Semi-pro League, introduced a minor update to their existing crocodile-themed emblem. The crest continues to depict a muscular crocodile from the chest upward, in a half-portrait style. For the 2025–26 season, the design was modified by adding the Thai letter "ธ" on the crocodile's chest and updating the founding year displayed at the bottom from "2021" to "2025".
- Uttaradit (Northern region), previously known as TPF Uttaradit, officially changed their club name to "Uttaradit". The club retained its existing crest design, but the lettering within the emblem was updated: the abbreviation "TPF" was replaced with "UTTFC". All other visual elements of the logo remain unchanged.
- Royal Thai Air Force (Central region), introduced a completely new crest. The previous emblem, which closely resembled the insignia of the Royal Thai Air Force with golden wings, a star, a tricolour shield, and a radiant crown, was replaced by a minimalist and modern design featuring geometric shapes representing wings and a star, with the club's name in Thai "ทหารอากาศ เอฟซี" displayed below.
- Singburi Warriors (Central region), a newly promoted club, unveiled a redesigned crest upon their promotion from the Thailand Semi-pro League. The previous emblem featured two red Singha lions facing each other with a football at the center, while the new design simplifies the imagery to a single silver Singha lion alongside a football, set against a two-tone maroon and gold shield with the club's name in a stylized font.
- Korat City (Northeastern region), formerly known as Suranaree Black Cat, underwent a rebranding before the 2025–26 Thai League 3 season. The change included both a new club name and a redesigned crest. The previous emblem, which featured a stylized black cat head in a minimalist design, was replaced with a modern shield-shaped logo that displays a grey cat head with a fierce expression under the banner Wonder Cat Korat City.
- Udon United (Northeastern region), introduced a new crest ahead of the 2025–26 season. The previous logo featured a wolf head design with white markings on the mouth and eyebrows on a bright yellow background. It was replaced with a simplified version that retains the wolf head motif but with darker tones and a deeper yellow background, while maintaining the inscription "Since 2018" at the bottom of the shield.
- Burapha United (Eastern region), formerly known as Banbueng City, changed their name and logo following promotion from the Thailand Semi-pro League to the 2025–26 Thai League 3 Eastern region. The club replaced its previous emblem, which featured a blue buffalo head, with a newly designed crest depicting a cheetah head accompanied by laurel leaves, a football, and the inscription Since 2025.
- Customs United (Eastern region), formerly Toko Customs United, simplified their club identity by dropping the prefix "Toko" from both their name and emblem. The crest now displays only the wording "Customs United", while all other design elements remain the same.
- Samut Sakhon City (Western region), updated their crest ahead of the 2025–26 season. The previous circular logo, which featured a photographic tiger head within a blue border, was replaced with a shield-shaped design that retains the tiger motif but incorporates additional maritime elements, including an anchor and a ship's wheel, along with the inscription Since 2022.
- Samut Songkhram City (Western region), updated their crest ahead of the 2025–26 season. The previous version featured a red shield with a stylized stingray motif and the inscriptions "SSC 2021". The revised crest retained the red shield and stingray motif but adopted a more dimensional appearance and replaced the inscriptions with "Samut Songkhram City".
- Chumphon United (Southern region), a newly promoted club from the Thailand Semi-pro League, has updated its logo by adopting a more dimensional appearance.
- PT Satun changed their logo by adding text "PT" into the club's logo and renamed to "PT Satun".

== Regional stage ==
The Regional Stage of the 2025–26 Thai League 3 includes 68 clubs divided into six regions: Northern (12 clubs), Central (11 clubs), Northeastern (12 clubs), Eastern (12 clubs), Western (11 clubs), and Southern (10 clubs). Each region operates in a round-robin format where clubs play each other in both home and away matches. The top two clubs from each region, the champion and the runner-up, qualify for the National Championship Stage. This stage serves to determine the regional winners and which clubs advance to the national competition.

=== Northern region ===
League table

Pos	Team	Pld	W	D	L	GF	GA	GD	Pts	Qualification or relegation
1	Uttaradit (C, Q)	22	12	9	1	55	15	+40	45	Qualification to the National Championship stage
2	Chiangmai (Q)	22	12	6	4	41	24	+17	42	Qualification to the National Championship stage
3	Phichit United	22	9	7	6	39	29	+10	34	
4	Khelang United	22	10	3	9	30	29	+1	33	
5	Northern Nakhon Mae Sot United	22	7	11	4	25	20	+5	32	
6	Maejo United	22	8	7	7	24	21	+3	31	
7	Phitsanulok	22	7	9	6	24	29	−5	30	
8	Chiangrai TSC	22	7	6	9	29	31	−2	27 (Note: Chiangrai TSC ahead on head-to-head record; Chiangrai TSC 3 pts (GD +1), Chattrakan City 3 pts (GD -1).)	
9	Chattrakan City	22	7	6	9	17	22	−5	27	
10	Chiangrai City	22	6	6	10	28	44	−16	24	
11	Kamphaengphet	22	5	4	13	17	36	−19	19	
12	Nakhon Sawan See Khwae City (R)	22	4	2	16	19	48	−29	14	Relegation to the Thailand Semi-pro League

Source: Thai League
Rules for classification: 1) Points; 2) Head-to-head points; 3) Head-to-head goal difference; 4) Head-to-head goal scored; 5) Overall goal difference; 6) Overall goal scored; 7) Fair play points; 8) Play-off without extra time).
(C) Champions; (Q) Qualified for the phase indicated; (R) Relegated

=== Central region ===
League table

Pos	Team	Pld	W	D	L	GF	GA	GD	Pts	Qualification or relegation
1	Prime Bangkok (C, Q)	20	14	5	1	47	14	+33	47	Qualification to the National Championship stage
2	North Bangkok University (Q)	20	11	4	5	29	16	+13	37	Qualification to the National Championship stage
3	PTU Pathum Thani	20	10	6	4	31	28	+3	36 (Note: PTU Pathum Thani ahead on head-to-head points record; PTU Pathum Thani 4 pts, Royal Thai Air Force 1 pt.)	
4	Royal Thai Air Force	20	11	3	6	28	20	+8	36	
5	Angthong	20	10	4	6	31	21	+10	34	
6	Chamchuri United	20	8	4	8	33	26	+7	28 (Note: Chamchuri United ahead on head-to-head points record; Chamchuri United 6 pts, Kasem Bundit University 0 pts.)	
7	Kasem Bundit University	20	7	7	6	26	26	0	28	
8	Futera United	20	4	5	11	27	35	−8	17	
9	Lopburi City	20	2	9	9	28	40	−12	15	
10	Singburi Warriors	20	3	5	12	18	41	−23	14	
11	Saraburi United (R)	20	2	4	14	19	50	−31	10	Relegation to the Thailand Semi-pro League

Source: Thai League
Rules for classification: 1) Points; 2) Head-to-head points; 3) Head-to-head goal difference; 4) Head-to-head goal scored; 5) Overall goal difference; 6) Overall goal scored; 7) Fair play points; 8) Play-off without extra time).
(C) Champions; (Q) Qualified for the phase indicated; (R) Relegated

=== Northeastern region ===
League table

Pos	Team	Pld	W	D	L	GF	GA	GD	Pts	Qualification or relegation
1	Muang Loei United (C, Q)	22	14	7	1	49	21	+28	49	Qualification to the National Championship stage
2	Udon United (Q)	22	13	6	3	48	23	+25	45	Qualification to the National Championship stage
3	Khon Kaen	22	11	8	3	32	13	+19	41	
4	EUMT	22	7	12	3	28	16	+12	33 (Note: EUMT ahead on head-to-head points record; EUMT 4 pts, Ubon Kruanapat 1 pt.)	
5	Ubon Kruanapat	22	9	6	7	28	28	0	33	
6	Surin City	22	8	8	6	25	22	+3	32 (Note: Surin City ahead on head-to-head points record; Surin City 4 pts, Roi Et PB United 1 pt.)	
7	Roi Et PB United	22	8	8	6	28	21	+7	32	
8	Udon Banjan United	22	8	5	9	22	31	−9	29	
9	Yasothon	22	6	6	10	28	33	−5	24	
10	Korat City	22	4	4	14	24	51	−27	16	
11	Khon Kaen Mordindang	22	3	3	16	18	40	−22	12	
12	Surin Khong Chee Mool (R)	22	2	5	15	16	47	−31	11	Relegation to the Thailand Semi-pro League

Source: Thai League
Rules for classification: 1) Points; 2) Head-to-head points; 3) Head-to-head goal difference; 4) Head-to-head goal scored; 5) Overall goal difference; 6) Overall goal scored; 7) Fair play points; 8) Play-off without extra time).
(C) Champions; (Q) Qualified for the phase indicated; (R) Relegated

=== Eastern region ===
League table

Pos	Team	Pld	W	D	L	GF	GA	GD	Pts	Qualification or relegation
1	Fleet (C, Q)	22	15	4	3	36	15	+21	49 (Note: Fleet ahead on head-to-head points record; Fleet 6 pts, Burapha United 0 pts.)	Qualification to the National Championship stage
2	Burapha United (Q)	22	15	4	3	60	18	+42	49	Qualification to the National Championship stage
3	Navy	22	11	7	4	32	17	+15	40	
4	Customs United	22	10	5	7	34	26	+8	35 (Note: The head-to-head record is tied; Customs United 3 pts (GD 0, GF 2), Bankhai United 3 pts (GD 0, GF 2). Customs United is ahead in the overall goals difference.)	
5	Bankhai United	22	10	5	7	27	25	+2	35	
6	Saimit Kabin United	22	9	6	7	24	26	−2	33	
7	BFB Pattaya City	22	7	7	8	29	40	−11	28	
8	Pluakdaeng United	22	6	7	9	26	33	−7	25	
9	Chachoengsao Hi-Tek	22	3	10	9	13	20	−7	19	
10	Marines	22	4	6	12	16	36	−20	18	
11	Padriew City	22	4	5	13	14	30	−16	17	
12	ACDC (R)	22	3	4	15	21	46	−25	13	Relegation to the Thailand Semi-pro League

Source: Thai League
Rules for classification: 1) Points; 2) Head-to-head points; 3) Head-to-head goal difference; 4) Head-to-head goal scored; 5) Overall goal difference; 6) Overall goal scored; 7) Fair play points; 8) Play-off without extra time).
(C) Champions; (Q) Qualified for the phase indicated; (R) Relegated

=== Western region ===
League table

Pos	Team	Pld	W	D	L	GF	GA	GD	Pts	Qualification or relegation
1	Samut Sakhon City (C, Q)	20	14	3	3	42	18	+24	45	Qualification to the National Championship stage
2	Thonburi United (Q)	20	11	6	3	35	18	+17	39	Qualification to the National Championship stage
3	Suphanburi	20	9	5	6	22	19	+3	32	
4	Thap Luang United	20	8	7	5	22	17	+5	31	
5	Samut Songkhram City	20	8	5	7	23	28	−5	29	
6	Assumption United	20	8	4	8	23	22	+1	28	
7	VRN Muangnont	20	5	8	7	24	27	−3	23	
8	Royal Thai Army	20	4	9	7	19	24	−5	21 (Note: The head-to-head record is tied; Royal Thai Army 3 pts (GD 0, GF 3), Hua Hin City 3 pts (GD 0, GF 3). Royal Thai Army is ahead in the overall goals difference.)	
9	Hua Hin City	20	5	6	9	21	30	−9	21	
10	Rajpracha	20	5	3	12	22	36	−14	18	
11	Nonthaburi United (R)	20	3	4	13	16	30	−14	13	Relegation to the Thailand Semi-pro League

Source: Thai League
Rules for classification: 1) Points; 2) Head-to-head points; 3) Head-to-head goal difference; 4) Head-to-head goal scored; 5) Overall goal difference; 6) Overall goal scored; 7) Fair play points; 8) Play-off without extra time).
(C) Champions; (Q) Qualified for the phase indicated; (R) Relegated

=== Southern region ===
League table

Pos	Team	Pld	W	D	L	GF	GA	GD	Pts	Qualification or relegation
1	Nara United (C, Q)	18	14	1	3	39	10	+29	43	Qualification to the National Championship stage
2	PT Satun (Q)	18	11	4	3	31	11	+20	37	Qualification to the National Championship stage
3	Yala	18	10	6	2	28	14	+14	36	
4	Samui United	18	10	3	5	37	16	+21	33	
5	PSU Surat Thani City	18	8	7	3	29	24	+5	31	
6	Muang Trang United	18	7	5	6	32	24	+8	26	
7	Phuket Andaman	18	6	5	7	24	21	+3	23	
8	Chumphon United	18	2	4	12	11	34	−23	10 (Note: The head-to-head record is tied; Chumphon United 2 pts (GD 0, GF 1), Ranong United 2 pts (GD 0, GF 1). Chumphon United is ahead in the overall goals difference.)	
9	Ranong United	18	2	4	12	10	36	−26	10	
10	Krabi (R)	18	0	1	17	1	52	−51	1	Relegation to the Thailand Semi-pro League

Source: Thai League
Rules for classification: 1) Points; 2) Head-to-head points; 3) Head-to-head goal difference; 4) Head-to-head goal scored; 5) Overall goal difference; 6) Overall goal scored; 7) Fair play points; 8) Play-off without extra time).
(C) Champions; (Q) Qualified for the phase indicated; (R) Relegated

== National Championship stage ==
The 2025–26 National Championship Stage features 12 clubs from the Regional Stage, including champions and runners-up from six regions. These clubs are divided into three groups: Group A (Northern and Central), Group B (Northeastern and Eastern), and Group C (Western and Southern). Each group plays in a round-robin, home-and-away format. The top club from each group advances to the semi-finals, along with the best second-placed club from all groups.

The knockout stage, held over two legs, uses aggregate scoring, with the away goals rule applied in case of a tie. If still level, extra time and penalties will decide the winner. Semi-final winners reach the final and secure promotion to Thai League 2, while the semi-final losers compete for third place, with the winner also earning promotion. This format ensures strong competition and offers promotion opportunities to the top clubs.

=== Group stage ===
Group A

Pos	Team	Pld	W	D	L	GF	GA	GD	Pts	Qualification	UTD	PBK	NBU	CMI
1	Uttaradit (Q)	6	3	2	1	10	8	+2	11	Advance to knockout stage	—	2–2	2–1	2–1
2	Prime Bangkok	6	3	1	2	14	9	+5	10		2–1	—	3–0	0–1
3	North Bangkok University	6	2	1	3	7	9	−2	7		0–1	4–2	—	1–0
4	Chiangmai	6	1	2	3	6	11	−5	5		2–2	1–5	1–1	—

Source: Thai League
Rules for classification: 1) Points; 2) Head-to-head points; 3) Head-to-head goal difference; 4) Head-to-head goal scored; 5) Overall goal difference; 6) Overall goal scored; 7) Fair play points; 8) Play-off without extra time).
(Q) Qualified for the phase indicated

Group B

Pos	Team	Pld	W	D	L	GF	GA	GD	Pts	Qualification	MLU	BPU	UDU	FLT
1	Muang Loei United (Q)	6	4	1	1	11	7	+4	13	Advance to knockout stage	—	1–0	2–1	1–0
2	Burapha United	6	3	1	2	8	8	0	10		2–4	—	1–0	2–2
3	Udon United	6	2	0	4	7	7	0	6		2–1	0–1	—	4–0
4	Fleet	6	1	2	3	7	11	−4	5		2–2	1–2	2–0	—

Source: Thai League
Rules for classification: 1) Points; 2) Head-to-head points; 3) Head-to-head goal difference; 4) Head-to-head goal scored; 5) Overall goal difference; 6) Overall goal scored; 7) Fair play points; 8) Play-off without extra time).
(Q) Qualified for the phase indicated

Group C

Pos	Team	Pld	W	D	L	GF	GA	GD	Pts	Qualification	STN	NRA	TBU	SKN
1	PT Satun (Q)	6	4	1	1	12	5	+7	13 (Note: PT Satun ahead on head-to-head record; PT Satun 3 pts (GD +1), Nara United 3 pts (GD -1).)	Advance to knockout stage	—	5–3	2–0	1–0
2	Nara United (Q)	6	4	1	1	14	10	+4	13	Advance to knockout stage	1–0	—	3–0	3–2
3	Thonburi United	6	1	2	3	6	13	−7	5		0–3	1–1	—	3–3
4	Samut Sakhon City	6	0	2	4	9	13	−4	2		1–1	2–3	1–2	—

Source: Thai League
Rules for classification: 1) Points; 2) Head-to-head points; 3) Head-to-head goal difference; 4) Head-to-head goal scored; 5) Overall goal difference; 6) Overall goal scored; 7) Fair play points; 8) Play-off without extra time).
(Q) Qualified for the phase indicated
Notes:

Ranking of second-placed clubs

Pos	Grp	Team	Pld	W	D	L	GF	GA	GD	Pts	Qualification
1	C	Nara United	6	4	1	1	14	10	+4	13	Advance to knockout stage
2	A	Prime Bangkok	6	3	1	2	14	9	+5	10	
3	B	Burapha United	6	3	1	2	8	8	0	10	

Source: Thai League
Rules for classification: 1) Points; 2) Goal difference; 3) Goals scored; 4) Away goals scored; 5) Wins; 6) Away wins.

=== Knockout stage ===
Semi-finals
Muang Loei United	0	1	1
Uttaradit	2	2	4
PT Satun	0	1	1
Nara United	0	5	5

Finals
Uttaradit	2	1	3
Nara United	3	1	4
Third place play-offs
Muang Loei United	1	1	2
PT Satun (a.e.t.)	1	3	4

==== Semi-finals ====
Team 1	Agg.	Team 2	1st leg	2nd leg
Muang Loei United	1–4	Uttaradit	0–2	1–2
PT Satun	1–5	Nara United	0–0	1–5

==== Third place play-offs ====
Team 1	Agg.	Team 2	1st leg	2nd leg
Muang Loei United	2–4	PT Satun	1–1	1–3 (a.e.t.)

==== Finals ====
Team 1	Agg.	Team 2	1st leg	2nd leg
Uttaradit	3–4	Nara United	2–3	1–1

== See also ==
- 2025–26 Thai League 1
- 2025–26 Thai League 2
- 2025–26 Thai League 3 Northern Region
- 2025–26 Thai League 3 Central Region
- 2025–26 Thai League 3 Northeastern Region
- 2025–26 Thai League 3 Eastern Region
- 2025–26 Thai League 3 Western Region
- 2025–26 Thai League 3 Southern Region
- 2025–26 Thai League 3 National Championship
- 2025–26 Thai League 3 Cup
- 2025–26 Thai FA Cup
- 2025–26 Thai League Cup
- 2025 Thai League Charity Match
- 2025 Thai U21 League
