= Nattaphon Krobyoo =

Thai footballer

Personal information
- Date of birth: 27 September 1989 (age 37)
- Place of birth: Sisaket, Thailand
- Height: 1.72 m (5 ft 7 1/2 in)
- Position: Goalkeeper

Team information
- Current team: Ranong United
- Number: 1

Senior career*
Years	Team	Apps	(Gls)
2010–2013	Ranong United	0	(0)
2013–2014	Port	0	(0)
2014–2016	Sisaket	0	(0)
2016	Udon Thani	8	(0)
2017	Samut Sakhon	24	(0)
2018	Khon Kaen	0	(0)
2019	Rajpracha	6	(0)
2019–2021	Ayutthaya United	6	(0)
2021–2022	Sisaket	26	(0)
2022–2023	Bankhai United	8	(0)
2023–	Ranong United	13	(0)
- * Club domestic league appearances and goals as of 30 April 2023

Nattaphon Krobyoo (Thai: ณัฐพล ครบอยู่, born September 27, 1989) is a Thai professional footballer who currently plays for Ranong United in the Thai League 2.
