= Chanin Sae-ear =

Thai footballer (born 1992)

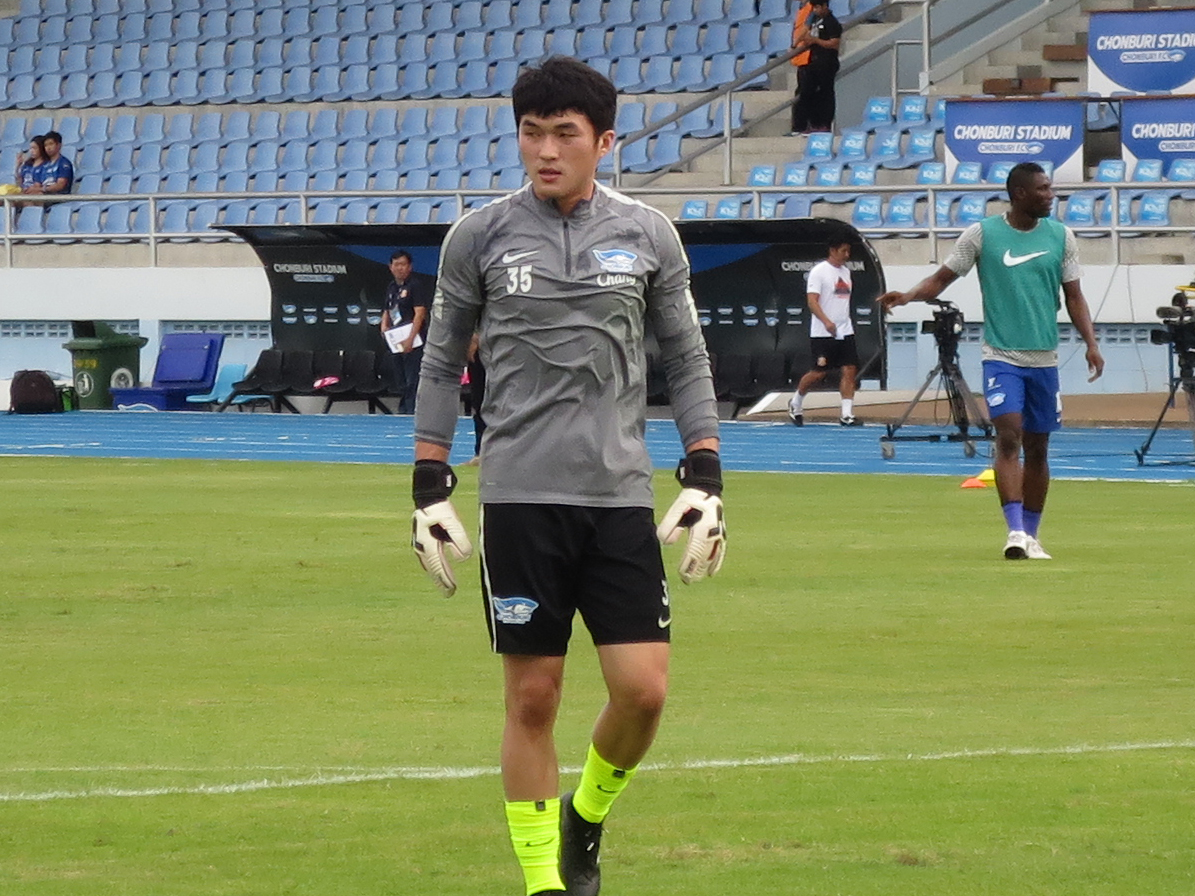

Personal information
- Full name: Chanin Sae-ear
- Date of birth: 5 July 1992 (age 34)
- Place of birth: Chumphon, Thailand
- Height: 1.75 m (5 ft 9 in)
- Position: Goalkeeper

Team information
- Current team: Chumphon United
- Number: 35

Youth career
- 2007–2009: Assumption College Sriracha

Senior career*
Years	Team	Apps	(Gls)
2010–2024	Chonburi	155	(0)
2010–2012	→ Sriracha (loan)	28	(0)
2013	→ Songkhla United (loan)	5	(0)
2013	→ Pattaya United (loan)	3	(0)
2014	→ Port (loan)	35	(0)
2015	→ Chainat Hornbill (loan)	15	(0)
2024–2025	Port	0	(0)
2025	→ Pattaya United (loan)	15	(0)
2025–	Chumphon United	3	(0)

International career^{‡}
2013–2015	Thailand U23	11	(0)
2014–2016	Thailand	3	(0)
Medal record
Thailand under-23
SEA Games
Gold medal – first place	Naypyitaw 2013	Team
Gold medal – first place	Singapore 2015	Team
Thailand
AFF Championship
Winner	Singapore-Vietnam 2014	Team
Winner	Myanmar-Philippines 2016	Team
- * Club domestic league appearances and goals as of 2 April 2026 ‡ National team caps and goals as of 22 October 2014

Chanin Sae-ear (Thai: ชนินทร์ แซ่เอียะ; RTGS: Chanin Sae-ia, born 5 July 1992) is a Thai professional footballer who plays as a goalkeeper.

== International career ==
Chanin played for the Thailand U-23 team at the 2014 Asian Games. He was also part of the senior squad at the 2014 AFF Suzuki Cup.

In May 2015, he was called up to play in a 2018 World Cup qualifying match against Vietnam.

Chanin was the starting keeper for Thailand at the 2015 Southeast Asian Games, conceding one goal in the whole tournament as Thailand won the gold medal.

=== Statistics ===
As of 12 November 2015

National team	Year	Apps	Goals
Thailand	2014	1	0
Thailand	2015	2	0
Thailand	Total	3	0

== Honours ==
=== Club ===
Chonburi

- Thai FA Cup: Runner-up 2020–21

Sriracha

- Thai Division 1 League (1): 2010

=== International ===
Thailand U-23

- SEA Games Gold Medal (2); 2013, 2015

Thailand

- AFF Championship (2): 2014, 2016
- King's Cup (1): 2016
