= Ryohei Maeda =

Japanese footballer

Personal information
- Date of birth: 5 May 1985 (age 41)
- Place of birth: Toyama Prefecture, Japan
- Height: 1.73 m (5 ft 8 in)
- Position: Midfielder

Team information
- Current team: Chumphon United
- Number: 42

Youth career
- 2001–2003: Toyama Daiichi High School
- 2004–2007: Chuo University

Senior career*
| Years | Team | Apps | (Gls) |
| 2008–2010 | Aries FC Tokyo | | |
| 2009 | → Albirex Niigata Singapore (loan) | 17 | (1) |
| 2011–2012 | Songkhla United | | |
| 2013 | Pluakdaeng Rayong | | |
| 2014–2020 | Krabi | 22 | (0) |
| 2020–2024 | Nara United | 38 | (1) |
| 2025– | Chumphon United | 18 | (0) |
- * Club domestic league appearances and goals as of 19 March 2026

Ryohei Maeda (前田 遼平, Maeda Ryohei; born 5 May 1985) is a Japanese footballer currently playing as a midfielder for Thai League 3 club Chumphon United.

== Career statistics ==
=== Club ===
As of 5 December 2018.

| Club | Season | League | | | Cup | | Continental | | Other | | Total | |
| Club | Season | Division | Apps | Goals | Apps | Goals | Apps | Goals | Apps | Goals | Apps | Goals |
|---|---|---|---|---|---|---|---|---|---|---|---|---|
| Albirex Niigata | 2009 | S.League | 17 | 1 | 0 | 0 | 0 | 0 | 0 | 0 | 17 | 1 |
| Career total | | | 17 | 1 | 0 | 0 | 0 | 0 | 0 | 0 | 17 | 1 |
