= 2019 Thai League 4 Southern Region =

Thai League 4 Southern Region
- Season: 2019
- Dates: 9 February 2019 – 31 August 2019
- Champions: Satun United
- Relegated: Muangkhon WU
- T4 Champions League: Satun United; Pattani
- Matches played: 84
- Goals scored: 219 (2.61 per match)
- Biggest home win: 8 goals difference Satun United 8–0 Muangkhon WU (7 August 2019)
- Biggest away win: 6 goals difference Phatthalung 1–7 Satun United (15 June 2019)
- Highest scoring: 8 goals Phatthalung 1–7 Satun United (15 June 2019); Satun United 8–0 Muangkhon WU (7 August 2019)
- Longest winning run: 4 matches Pattani
- Longest unbeaten run: 11 matches Surat Thani City
- Longest winless run: 12 matches Jalor City
- Longest losing run: 8 matches Muangkhon WU
- Highest attendance: 1,800; Satun United 3–1 Jalor City (31 August 2019)
- Lowest attendance: 38; Hatyai City 0–0 Surat Thani City (31 July 2019)
- Total attendance: 46,158
- Average attendance: 563

The 2019 Thai League 4 Southern region is a region in the regional stage of the 2019 Thai League 4. A total of 7 teams located in Southern of Thailand will compete in the league of the Southern region.

== Teams ==
=== Number of teams by province ===
Position	Province	Number	Teams
1	Nakhon Si Thammarat	1	Muangkhon WU
1	Pattani	1	Pattani
1	Phatthalung	1	Phatthalung
1	Satun	1	Satun United
1	Songkhla	1	Hatyai City
1	Surat Thani	1	Surat Thani City
1	Yala	1	Jalor City

=== Stadiums and locations ===
Locations of the 2019 Thai League 4 Southern region teams

Team	Location	Stadium	Coordinates
Hatyai City	Songkhla (Hat Yai)	Southern Major City Stadium	6°55′05″N 100°27′26″E
Jalor City	Yala (Mueang)	Jaru Stadium	6°34′42″N 101°17′52″E
Muangkhon WU	Nakhon Si Thammarat (Tha Sala)	Walailak University Stadium	8°38′59″N 99°52′44″E
Pattani	Pattani (Mueang)	Pattani Provincial Stadium	6°53′20″N 101°14′41″E
Phatthalung	Phatthalung (Mueang)	Phatthalung Provincial Stadium	7°37′00″N 100°02′55″E
Satun United	Satun (Mueang)	Satun PAO. Stadium	6°39′05″N 100°04′45″E
Surat Thani City	Surat Thani (Wiang Sa)	Ban Song Municipality Stadium	8°39′43″N 99°22′32″E

== League table ==
=== Standings ===
Pos	Team	Pld	W	D	L	GF	GA	GD	Pts	Qualification or relegation
1	Satun United (Q)	24	14	5	5	47	17	+30	47	Qualification to the Champions League stage
2	Pattani (Q)	24	12	7	5	34	20	+14	43	Qualification to the Champions League stage
3	Surat Thani City	24	11	9	4	39	26	+13	42	
4	Hatyai City	24	8	4	12	31	34	−3	28	
5	Jalor City	24	5	9	10	20	31	−11	24	
6	Phatthalung	24	4	10	10	18	33	−15	22	
7	Muangkhon WU (R)	24	5	6	13	30	58	−28	21	Relegation to the 2020 Thailand Amateur League

Source: Thai League
Rules for classification: 1) Points; 2) Head-to-head points; 3) Head-to-head goal difference; 4) Head-to-head goal scored; 5) Overall goal difference; 6) Overall goal scored; 7) Fair play points; 8) Play-off without extra time).
(Q) Qualified for the phase indicated; (R) Relegated

=== Positions by round ===
Qualification to the Champions League stage
Relegation to the 2020 Thailand Amateur League

Team ╲ Round	1	2	3	4	5	6	7	8	9	10	11	12	13	14	15	16	17	18	19	20	21	22	23	24	25	26	27	28
Satun United	3	1	1	1	2	2	2	3	2	1	2	2	1	1	1	1	1	1	1	1	1	1	1	1	1	1	1	1
Pattani	2	3	2	2	1	1	1	1	1	2	1	1	2	2	2	2	2	2	2	2	2	2	2	2	2	2	2	2
Surat Thani City	7	5	3	3	5	3	3	2	3	3	3	3	3	3	3	3	3	3	3	3	3	3	3	3	3	3	3	3
Hatyai City	1	2	4	6	6	4	4	4	4	4	6	5	4	4	4	4	4	4	4	4	4	4	4	4	4	4	4	4
Jalor City	6	4	5	5	3	5	5	5	6	6	4	6	5	6	6	6	6	6	5	6	6	7	6	6	7	5	5	5
Phatthalung	4	6	6	4	4	6	6	6	5	5	5	4	6	5	5	5	5	5	6	5	5	6	5	7	6	6	6	6
Muangkhon WU	5	7	7	7	7	7	7	7	7	7	7	7	7	7	7	7	7	7	7	7	7	5	7	5	5	7	7	7

Source: Thai League

=== Results by round ===
Team ╲ Round	1	2	3	4	5	6	7	8	9	10	11	12	13	14	15	16	17	18	19	20	21	22	23	24	25	26	27	28
Satun United	W	W	W	N	L	D	W	L	W	W	N	D	W	D	W	W	W	N	L	D	W	L	W	L	N	W	D	W
Pattani	W	L	W	W	W	N	W	D	D	D	W	D	N	L	W	D	W	L	W	N	W	D	D	L	W	L	N	W
Surat Thani City	L	W	D	D	N	W	W	W	D	W	L	N	D	L	L	D	W	W	N	D	D	W	D	W	D	N	W	W
Hatyai City	W	N	L	L	D	W	L	W	N	L	L	D	D	W	L	N	L	W	W	W	D	L	N	W	L	L	L	L
Jalor City	L	W	N	D	W	L	L	D	L	N	W	L	D	D	L	D	N	L	D	L	L	D	D	N	D	W	W	L
Phatthalung	N	L	D	W	D	D	L	N	W	L	D	D	L	W	N	D	L	L	L	D	L	N	D	L	D	W	D	L
Muangkhon WU	L	L	L	L	L	L	N	L	L	D	D	W	D	N	W	L	L	W	D	D	N	W	L	W	D	L	L	N

N = No match; W = Won; D = Drawn; L = Lost

=== Results ===
For the Southern region, a total 24 matches per team competing in 4 legs.

Home \ Away	HYC	JLC	MKW	PTN	PLG	STU	STC	HYC	JLC	MKW	PTN	PLG	STU	STC
Hatyai City	—	2–1	4–1	0–2	2–2	0–1	3–2	—	2–0	2–3	2–1	0–1	2–0	0–0
Jalor City	1–1	—	1–0	0–0	1–0	0–2	3–0	3–1	—	1–1	0–0	0–0	0–2	1–1
Muangkhon WU	1–3	2–0	—	1–1	1–2	1–3	0–2	2–1	0–2	—	4–1	2–1	0–3	3–3
Pattani	3–2	3–0	3–1	—	1–2	1–0	2–2	1–0	2–0	4–0	—	3–0	1–0	0–0
Phatthalung	0–0	3–1	1–1	0–1	—	1–7	0–0	0–2	0–0	2–2	0–1	—	2–2	0–1
Satun United	3–0	1–1	3–1	1–1	1–1	—	3–0	1–0	3–1	8–0	2–0	0–0	—	1–0
Surat Thani City	1–0	2–2	2–2	1–0	2–0	2–0	—	4–2	3–1	5–1	2–2	2–0	2–0	—

Source: Thai League
Legend: Blue = home team win; Yellow = draw; Red = away team win.
For upcoming matches, an "a" indicates there is an article about the rivalry between the two participants.

== Season statistics ==
=== Top scorers by team ===
Position	Teams	Name	Goals
1	Surat Thani City	(Nigeria) Julius Chukwuma Ononiwu	14
2	Satun United	(Brazil) Caio Rodrigues Da Cruz	13
3	Pattani	(Georgia (country)) Giorgi Tsimakuridze	10
4	Muangkhon WU	(Iran) Chajouei Mahdi Mohammad	9
5	Hatyai City	(Thailand) Apdussalam Saman	8
6	Jalor City	(Thailand) Muhammadsalfadee Jehteh	4
6	Jalor City	(Thailand) Suttichai Doungead	4
6	Phatthalung	(Thailand) Teerawat Durnee	4

== Attendances ==
=== Overall statistical table ===
Pos	Team	Total	High	Low	Average	Change
	Satun United	13,814	1,800	664	1,256	−12.8%
	Pattani	9,260	1,320	166	771	+46.3%
	Jalor City	8,891	1,500	191	741	n/a
	Muangkhon WU	4,693	650	245	391	n/a
	Phatthalung	3,814	600	100	318	+30.9%
	Surat Thani City	3,521	500	40	293	−19.7%
	Hatyai City	2,165	400	38	197	−30.9%
	League total	46,158	1,800	38	563	+11.7%

Source: Thai League

=== Attendances by home match played ===
Team \ Match played	1	2	3	4	5	6	7	8	9	10	11	12	Total
Hatyai City	211	222	300	Unk.2	150	225	250	162	400	38	140	67	2,165
Jalor City	800	450	1,250	1,500	1,000	350	800	191	200	1,000	650	700	8,891
Muangkhon WU	400	382	650	300	245	335	453	254	485	358	378	453	4,693
Pattani	1,260	531	1,172	540	534	500	400	1,320	1,037	500	166	1,300	9,260
Phatthalung	600	425	550	530	200	300	141	170	100	108	240	450	3,814
Satun United	664	1,720	Unk.1	1,200	1,500	1,370	1,300	810	1,050	850	1,550	1,800	13,814
Surat Thani City	500	40	300	250	220	500	91	500	300	300	300	220	3,521

Source: Thai League Note:
Unk.1 Some error of T4 official match report 17 March 2019 (Satun United 1–1 Phatthalung).
Unk.2 Some error of T4 official match report 21 April 2019 (Hatyai City 0–1 Satun United).

== See also ==
- 2019 Thai League 1
- 2019 Thai League 2
- 2019 Thai League 3
- 2019 Thai League 4
- 2019 Thailand Amateur League
- 2019 Thai FA Cup
- 2019 Thai League Cup
- 2019 Thailand Champions Cup
