= Emmanuel Sonupe =

English association football player

Personal information
- Full name: Emmanuel Olukolade Sonupe
- Date of birth: 21 March 1996 (age 30)
- Place of birth: Denmark Hill, London, England
- Position: Winger

Team information
- Current team: Samui United
- Number: 14

Youth career
- 2012–2014: Tottenham Hotspur

Senior career*
Years	Team	Apps	(Gls)
2014–2016	Tottenham Hotspur	0	(0)
2015	→ St Mirren (loan)	4	(0)
2016–2017	Northampton Town	1	(0)
2017	→ Kidderminster Harriers (loan)	4	(1)
2017–2018	Kidderminster Harriers	37	(10)
2018–2020	Stevenage	41	(4)
2020–2021	Yeovil Town	15	(2)
2021	Dartford	7	(0)
2022–2023	El Paso Locomotive	47	(4)
2024	Masafi	?	(?)
2024–2025	Precision	17	(3)
2025–2026	Solihull Moors	30	(4)
2026–	Samui United	0	(0)

International career
2013	England U16	1	(0)
2014	England U18	2	(1)
- * Club domestic league appearances and goals as of 17:24, 2 Junly 2026 (UTC)

Emmanuel Olukolade Sonupe (born 21 March 1996) is an English professional footballer who plays as a winger for Thai League 3 club Samui United.

Sonupe started his career at Tottenham Hotspur, although he did not make any first-team appearances. He was loaned out to Scottish Premiership club St Mirren in February 2015 for the remainder of the 2014–15 campaign. He was released by Tottenham in June 2016 and later signed for League One team Northampton Town. Sonupe was loaned out to Kidderminster Harriers of the National League North, and following his departure from Northampton, he signed for Kidderminster on a permanent basis. After one year at Kidderminster, he joined League Two club Stevenage in June 2018 where he spent two seasons. Sonupe signed for Yeovil Town of the National League in November 2020 and spent the 2020–21 season there. Sonupe has also represented England at under-16 and under-18 level.

== Early life ==
Born in Denmark Hill, London, Sonupe's parents are Nigerian.

== Club career ==
=== Early career ===
Sonupe began his career in the youth set-up at Tottenham Hotspur in 2012, where he initially played for the under-18 team before progressing to under-21 level. Having scored twice in eleven appearances for Tottenham's under-21 team during the first half of the 2014–15 season, Sonupe was loaned out to Scottish Premiership club St Mirren in order to gain first-team experience on 2 February 2015. The loan agreement ran until the end of the season. He made his professional debut in a 2–1 home defeat to Inverness Caledonian Thistle on 14 February 2015, coming on as a 61st-minute substitute in the match. The loan spell concluded on 29 May 2015, making just four appearances during the three-month spell. He spent the 2015–16 season playing for Tottenham's under-21 team, but did not make any first-team appearances for the club. He was released by Tottenham upon the expiry of his contract in June 2016.

=== Northampton Town ===
Without a club, Sonupe had a trial at Charlton Athletic in pre-season ahead of the 2016–17 season, playing 45 minutes in pre-season friendly matches against Welling United and Bromley respectively, before being asked back to play in another friendly against Dulwich Hamlet. No transfer materialised, however, and Sonupe subsequently signed for League One club Northampton Town on 12 August 2016 following a successful trial period, joining on a one-year contract. Northampton manager Rob Page stated that the initial focus was on developing Sonupe — "we will work with him, we will develop him and we think he can develop into an asset for us". He made his debut as a substitute in a 0–0 draw with AFC Wimbledon on 20 August 2016. Sonupe went on to make just three further appearances during the season, all of which were in the EFL Trophy.

Having not made any first-team appearances for four months, Sonupe was loaned out to National League North club Kidderminster Harriers on 23 March 2017 for the remainder of the season. He made five appearances during the brief loan spell, scoring his first goal in senior football in a 4–1 away victory over Altrincham on 17 April 2017. On his return to Northampton, Sonupe was released when his contract expired in May 2017.

=== Kidderminster Harriers ===
After making "a big impression" during his loan spell, Sonupe signed for Kidderminster on a permanent basis on 30 June 2017. He joined the National League North club on a one-year contract. The 2017–18 season was to serve as Sonupe's first full season of regular first-team football. He started the season by scoring three goals in as many games, which included scoring twice in a 2–1 victory away at FC United of Manchester on 12 August 2017. Sonupe's goal tally reached double figures before the end of the calendar year having scored eleven times in all competitions. He went on to score 15 times during the season, making 46 appearances, as Kidderminster's season ended with defeat at the National League North play-off qualifying round stage.

=== Stevenage ===
Sonupe signed for League Two club Stevenage for an undisclosed five-figure fee on 13 June 2018. He made his Stevenage debut in the club's opening match of the 2018–19 season, a 2–2 draw with Tranmere Rovers at Broadhall Way, coming on as a 64th-minute substitute in the match. Sonupe scored his first goal for Stevenage in a 3–1 home victory against Colchester United on 6 October 2018. He played predominantly as a substitute during his first season with the club, although ended the season by starting in the last five league matches. This included him scoring twice in a 4–1 away victory at Port Vale on 19 April 2019. Sonupe made 37 appearances in all competitions during the season, of which 26 were as a substitute, scoring three goals, as Stevenage finished in tenth position in League Two, one point off of the play-off places. He made 14 appearances during the 2019–20 season, scoring once. Sonupe was released by the club upon the expiry of his contract in June 2020.

=== Yeovil Town ===
Having started the 2020–21 season without a club, Sonupe signed for National League club Yeovil Town on 28 November 2020, on a contract for the remainder of the season. He debuted for Yeovil in the club's 2–1 victory away at Bromley on 8 December 2020, playing the first 73 minutes of the match. Sonupe scored his first goal in a 3–1 victory against King's Lynn Town on 15 May 2021. He made 15 appearances during the season, scoring twice, as Yeovil finished the season in 16th-place in the National League. Sonupe was released by Yeovil upon the expiry of his contract at the end of the season.

=== Dartford ===
On 28 September 2021, Sonupe played for Dartford in the London Senior Cup against Athletic Newham at Princes Park. He started the match and scored two of the goals as Dartford ran out 5-2 winners.

=== El Paso Locomotive ===
On 16 December 2021, it was announced that Sonupe would join USL Championship side El Paso Locomotive ahead of their 2022 season. The club confirmed on 25 October 2022 that Sonupe would return for the 2023 season. On 1 November 2023, it was announced that Sonupe would not be returning to El Paso for the 2024 season.

=== United Arab Emirates ===
On 1 February 2024, Sonupe joined UAE First Division League club Masafi Club.

In September 2024, Sonupe joined UAE Second Division League side Precision Football.

=== Solihull Moors ===
On 29 August 2025, Sonupe returned to England, joining National League club Solihull Moors on a short-term contract until 30 September.

=== Samui United ===
On 1 July 2026, Sonupe joined Thai League 3 club Samui United on a one-year deal.

== International career ==
Sonupe has represented England at both under-16 and under-18 level. He is also eligible to play for Nigeria owing to his Nigerian ancestry.

== Career statistics ==
As of match played 18 April 2026

Appearances and goals by club, season and competition
Club	Season	League			National Cup		League Cup		Other		Total	
Club	Season	Division	Apps	Goals	Apps	Goals	Apps	Goals	Apps	Goals	Apps	Goals
Tottenham Hotspur	2014–15	Premier League	0	0	0	0	0	0	0	0	0	0
Tottenham Hotspur	2015–16	Premier League	0	0	0	0	0	0	0	0	0	0
Tottenham Hotspur	Total		0	0	0	0	0	0	0	0	0	0
St Mirren (loan)	2014–15	Scottish Premiership	4	0	0	0	0	0	—		4	0
Northampton Town	2016–17	League One	1	0	0	0	0	0	3 (Note: Three appearances in the EFL Trophy)	0	4	0
Kidderminster Harriers (loan)	2016–17	National League North	4	1	0	0	—		1 (Note: One appearance in the National League North play-offs)	0	5	1
Kidderminster Harriers	2017–18	National League North	37	10	3	3	—		6 (Note: Five appearances and two goals in the FA Trophy, one appearance in the National League North play-offs)	2	46	15
Kidderminster Harriers	Total		41	11	3	3	—		7	2	51	16
Stevenage	2018–19	League Two	32	3	1	0	1	0	3 (Note: Three appearances in the EFL Trophy)	0	37	3
Stevenage	2019–20	League Two	9	1	2	0	1	0	2 (Note: Two appearances in the EFL Trophy)	0	14	1
Stevenage	Total		41	4	3	0	2	0	5	0	51	4
Yeovil Town	2020–21	National League	15	2	0	0	—		0	0	15	2
Dartford	2021–22	National League South	7	0	2	0	—		3 (Note: Two appearances and five goals in the London Senior Cup) (Note: One appearance in the FA Trophy)	5	12	5
El Paso Locomotive	2022	USL Championship	16	1	1	0	—		—		17	1
El Paso Locomotive	2023	USL Championship	31	3	1	0	—		—		32	3
El Paso Locomotive	Total		47	4	2	0	0	0	0	0	49	4
Solihull Moors	2025-26	National League	30	4	0	0	—		3 (Note: Three appearances and one goal in the National League Cup)	1	33	5
Career total			185	25	10	3	2	0	21	8	218	36
