= Chumphon United F.C. =

Chumphon United ชุมพร ยูไนเต็ด
- Full name: Chumphon United Football Club
- Nicknames: The Tiger (เดอะไทเกอร์)
- Founded: 2022; 4 years ago
- Ground: Stadium of Thai National Sports University, Chumphon Campus; Chumphon, Thailand
- Capacity: 1,500
- Coordinates: 10°27′23″N 99°07′45″E
- Owner(s): Chumphon United Football Club Ltd., Part.
- Chairman: Jiratheep Sagat
- Head coach: Chaiwat Howumphanpaitoon
- League: Thai League 3
- 2025–26: Thai League 3, 8th of 10 in the Southern region
- Website: Facebook

Chumphon United Football Club (Thai: สโมสรฟุตบอล ชุมพร ยูไนเต็ด) is a Thai professional football club based in Chumphon, Thailand. The club was founded in 2022 and currently competes in the Thai League 3 Southern region, the third tier of the Thai football league system. Chumphon United plays its home matches at the Stadium of Thai National Sports University, Chumphon Campus.

== History ==
Chumphon United Football Club was established in 2022 and adopted its first crest, featuring a warship on a blue background, which represents the province's coastal and maritime identity. During its inaugural year, the club did not participate in any official competitions.

In the 2023–24 season, Chumphon United made their first competitive appearance by entering the 2023–24 Thai FA Cup. The club was drawn in the qualification round and was eliminated after a 4–0 away defeat to Roi Et PB United.

In 2025, Chumphon United joined the Thai football league system for the first time by competing in the 2025 Thailand Semi-pro League, the fourth tier of Thai football. Ahead of the competition, the club unveiled a new crest featuring a tiger's head with a yellow upper jaw, symbolizing strength and determination. The team competed in the Southern region, which consisted of only two teams: Chumphon United and Samui United. Samui United finished first in the group and earned automatic promotion to the 2025–26 Thai League 3 Southern Region, while Chumphon United placed second and initially missed promotion.

Later that same year, Chumphon United were granted a special promotion to the 2025–26 Thai League 3 Southern region after Songkhla and Pattani, two clubs from the 2024–25 Thai League 3 Southern Region, were promoted to Thai League 2, leaving vacant spots in the division. Following the confirmation of their promotion, the club updated its crest once again, redesigning the tiger emblem with a white upper jaw and enhanced color gradients to create a more modern and dimensional appearance. After moving up to Thai League 3, the club appointed experienced coach Sarawut Treephan as the team's technical director. Chumphon United also strengthened their squad by signing several notable players, including former Thailand national team goalkeeper Chanin Sae-ear and veteran defender Seeket Madputeh, who had previously played for several top-flight Thai clubs. Additionally, the team recruited three foreign players from Nigeria, South Korea, and Japan to bolster the squad ahead of the new season.

== Stadium and locations ==
Coordinates	Location	Stadium	Year
10°27′23″N 99°07′45″E	Mueang, Chumphon	Stadium of Thai National Sports University, Chumphon Campus	2025 – present

== Season by season record ==
Season	League									FA Cup	League Cup	T3 Cup	Top goalscorer	
Season	Division	P	W	D	L	F	A	Pts	Pos	FA Cup	League Cup	T3 Cup	Name	Goals
2023–24										QR	Ineligible	Ineligible	—	—
2025	TS South	4	0	2	2	2	6	2	2nd	Opted out	Ineligible	Ineligible	(Thailand) Kittipong Baukaw, (Thailand) Papon Watthanaphumchu	1
2025–26	T3 South	18	2	4	12	11	34	10	8th	Opted out	Opted out	Opted out	(Thailand) Chakkrit Thongnaulchan	3

Champions	Runners-up	Promoted	Relegated

- P = Played
- W = Games won
- D = Games drawn
- L = Games lost
- F = Goals for
- A = Goals against
- Pts = Points
- Pos = Final position
- QR1 = First Qualifying Round
- QR2 = Second Qualifying Round
- R1 = Round 1
- R2 = Round 2
- R3 = Round 3
- R4 = Round 4
- R5 = Round 5
- R6 = Round 6
- QF = Quarter-finals
- SF = Semi-finals
- RU = Runners-up
- W = Winners

== Players ==
=== Current squad ===
As of 24 October 2025

Note: Flags indicate national team as defined under FIFA eligibility rules; some limited exceptions apply. Players may hold more than one non-FIFA nationality.

No.	Pos.	Nation	Player
1	GK	THA	Anuwat Khotchaphakdee
3	DF	THA	Rattapoom Kanjanakorn
4	MF	THA	Seeket Madputeh
5	DF	THA	Natdanai Daengpradap
6	MF	THA	Cinnawat Sangmala
7	FW	THA	Pattarachanon Sayomphak
8	MF	THA	Jirakrit Deesamut
9	FW	THA	Muhammadaman Songdam
10	FW	THA	Rachata Intharason
11	FW	THA	Suwan Thonghai
13	DF	THA	Pongpipat Wichean
14	FW	THA	Ruttasat Kanjanakorn
15	DF	THA	Papon Watthanaphumchu
19	FW	THA	Nattapong Srisompoch
20	DF	THA	Khongsak Phumruangnam
21	DF	THA	Sarunyu Intharasuwan

No.	Pos.	Nation	Player
22	GK	THA	Naruebet Srisombun
23	MF	THA	Wuttipan Rueannang
25	DF	THA	Natthanon Ninsai
26	DF	THA	Siraphop Tanprasit
28	MF	KOR	Kim Ye-sung
29	DF	THA	Chusak Srichai
30	FW	THA	Chakkrit Thongnaulchan
31	FW	THA	Kittipong Baukaw
35	GK	THA	Chanin Sae-ear
36	DF	THA	Worapong Ma-aiam
39	DF	THA	Jiratheep Sagat
42	MF	JPN	Ryohei Maeda (captain)
55	DF	THA	Sorawid Dumratkan
66	DF	THA	Patipon Payonpap
77	FW	NGA	Emmanue Larinze Ojemuyide
91	GK	THA	Supphachok Kumat
