= Samui United F.C. =

Samui United สมุย ยูไนเต็ด
- Full name: Samui United Football Club
- Nicknames: The Island Boys (เด็กเกาะ)
- Founded: 2010; 16 years ago
- Ground: Ko Samui City Municipality International Stadium; Surat Thani, Thailand
- Capacity: 2,000
- Coordinates: 9°26′06″N 100°00′27″E
- Owner(s): Samui United Football Club Co., Ltd.
- Chairman: Umaporn Kuasom
- Head coach: Chaiyachet Kochkosai
- League: Thai League 3
- 2025–26: Thai League 3, 4th of 10 in the Southern region
- Website: Facebook

Samui United Football Club (Thai: สโมสรฟุตบอล สมุย ยูไนเต็ด) is a Thai professional football club based in Ko Samui, Surat Thani. It was established in 2024 as the senior team of Samui United Academy, which was originally founded in 2010. The club competes in Thai League 3, the third tier of Thai football league system.

== History ==
Samui United Football Club was established in 2024 as the professional senior team of Samui United Academy, which had been operating as a youth football academy since 2010. The club made its competitive debut in the 2024 season of the Thailand Semi-pro League, the fourth tier of the Thai football league system. In their inaugural season, Samui United competed in the Western region and played their home matches at the His Majesty the King's 80th Birthday Anniversary Stadium, Tha Yang Subdistrict Municipality in Tha Yang, Phetchaburi. They finished sixth in the regional group stage, with a record of two wins, one draw, and three losses from six matches, scoring 11 goals and conceding 11.

In 2025, the club relocated its home base to the Ko Samui City Municipality International Stadium in their native Surat Thani province and was reassigned to the Southern region. Competing against only one other team, Chumphon United, Samui United finished at the top of the group after four matches with two wins and two draws, scoring six goals and conceding two. As regional champions, the club secured promotion to Thai League 3 for the 2025–26 season. That season also saw former Thailand international Mika Chunuonsee join the club as both vice president and registered player, marking a significant move as Samui United began to build a stronger professional structure.

== Stadium and locations ==
Coordinates	Location	Stadium	Year
12°57′43″N 99°53′56″E	Tha Yang, Phetchaburi	His Majesty the King's 80th Birthday Anniversary Stadium, Tha Yang Subdistrict Municipality	2024
9°26′06″N 100°00′27″E	Ko Samui, Surat Thani	Ko Samui City Municipality International Stadium	2025 – present

== Season by season record ==
Season	League									FA Cup	League Cup	T3 Cup	Top goalscorer	
Season	Division	P	W	D	L	F	A	Pts	Pos	FA Cup	League Cup	T3 Cup	Name	Goals
2024	TS West	6	2	1	3	11	11	7	6th	Opted out	Ineligible	Ineligible	(Thailand) Jirapat Klimkaew	5
2025	TS South	4	2	2	0	6	2	8	1st	Opted out	Ineligible	Ineligible	(Thailand) Mika Chunuonsee	3
2025–26	T3 South	18	10	3	5	37	16	33	4th	R2	QR2	R16	(Nigeria) Aliu Micheal Abdul	15
2026–27	T3 South										QR1			

Champions	Runners-up	Promoted	Relegated

- P = Played
- W = Games won
- D = Games drawn
- L = Games lost
- F = Goals for
- A = Goals against
- Pts = Points
- Pos = Final position
- QR1 = First Qualifying Round
- QR2 = Second Qualifying Round
- R1 = Round 1
- R2 = Round 2
- R3 = Round 3
- R4 = Round 4
- R5 = Round 5
- R6 = Round 6
- QF = Quarter-finals
- SF = Semi-finals
- RU = Runners-up
- W = Winners

== Players ==
=== Current squad ===
As of 25 August 2026

Note: Flags indicate national team as defined under FIFA eligibility rules; some limited exceptions apply. Players may hold more than one non-FIFA nationality.

No.	Pos.	Nation	Player
1	GK	THA	Suphatchai Hiranburana
3	DF	THA	Fahat Mudheem (vice-captain)
4	DF	THA	Alfie Terry
5	DF	THA	Navaphon Aroonsangtichai
6	MF	THA	Supphawat Srimek
7	FW	NGR	Michael Aliu
8	MF	THA	Warawut Motim
9	FW	THA	Amarin Chaisuesat (captain)
10	MF	WAL	Tommy O'Sullivan
11	FW	THA	Thanadon Yankaew
14	FW	ENG	Emmanuel Sonupe
15	DF	THA	Anthonio Sanjairag
16	DF	THA	Mika Chunuonsee
17	MF	THA	Phonprom Furzer

No.	Pos.	Nation	Player
18	DF	THA	Phongtip Sribenjakul
20	MF	THA	Thanaphat Wasu
22	GK	THA	Ardenan Bindoloh
23	DF	THA	Taweechai Kliangklao
25	MF	THA	Natthakon Chamnian
29	MF	THA	Patipat Srikhul
30	FW	BRA	Jhonatan Bernardo
37	DF	THA	Aekkaphon Fangnongd
39	GK	THA	Worawit Promchuay
45	MF	THA	Anantayot Intharakamnoed
49	DF	THA	Panyakorn Promcharoen
77	FW	THA	Sattawat Sakprom
96	DF	THA	Chanathip Krainara
99	FW	THA	Songkitti Thongkam

== Club management ==
Position	Name
Chairman	(Thailand) Umaporn Kuasom
Vice-Chairman	(Thailand) Mika Chunuonsee
Team Manager	(Thailand) Thanaphon Chunuonsee
Technical Director	(Brazil) Jonathas Candido
Head coach	(Thailand) Chaiyachet Kochkosai
Assistant Coach	(Madagascar) Worthy Rabenantoandro (Thailand) Thanasarn Sukonpan
Goalkeeper Coach	(Thailand) Aekkachai Buhga
Fitness coach	(Thailand) Sayomchai Yuprasert
Team Staff	(Thailand) Anan Thippayamongkol

== Honours ==
=== Domestic competitions ===
==== League ====
- Thailand Semi-pro League
  - Runners-up (1) : 2025
