= Jhonatan Bernardo =

Brazilian footballer

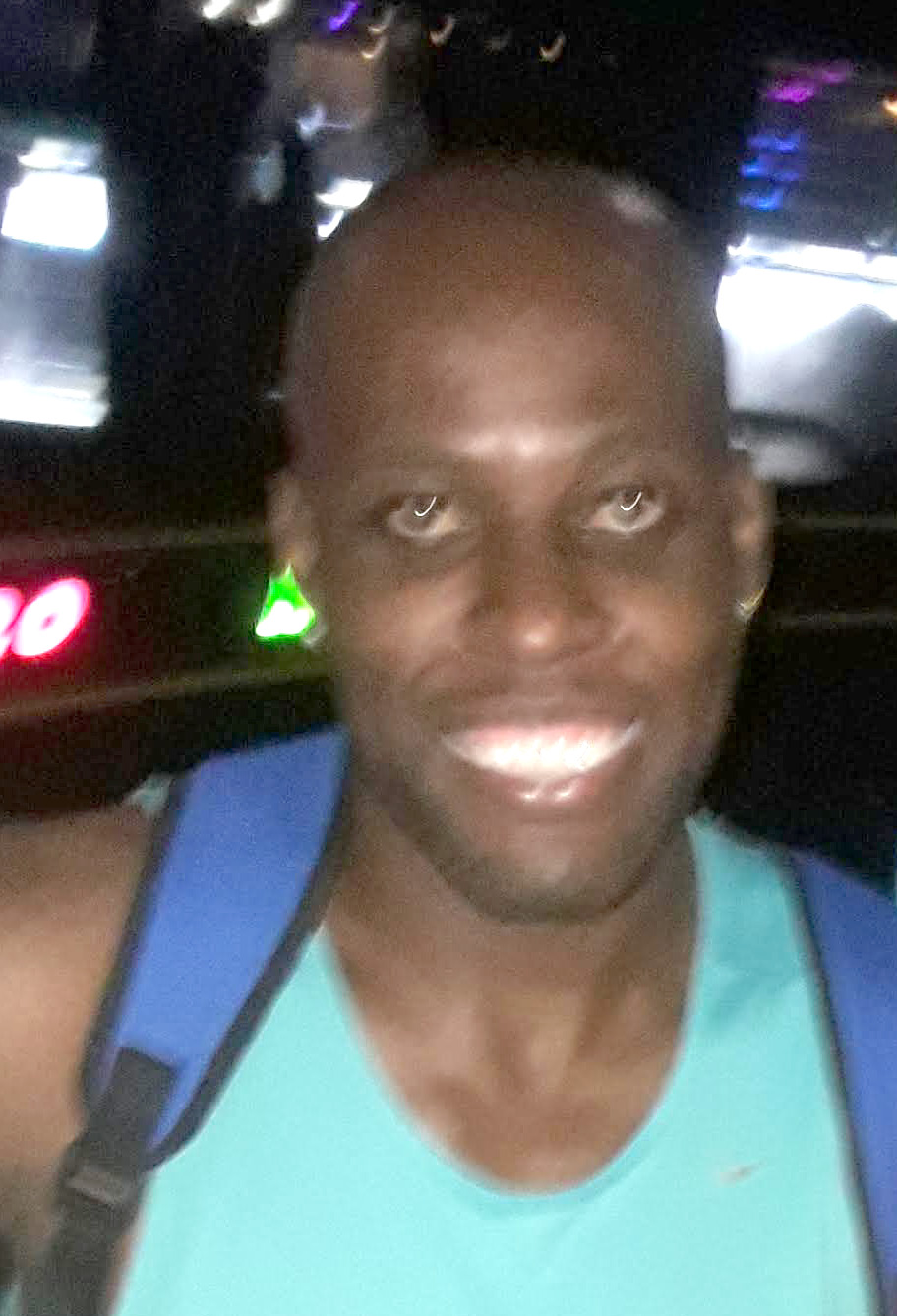

Personal information
- Full name: Jhonatan Mariano Bernardo
- Date of birth: 7 November 1988 (age 38)
- Place of birth: São Paulo, Brazil
- Height: 1.88 m (6 ft 2 in)
- Position: Striker

Team information
- Current team: Songkhla
- Number: 9

Youth career
- 2005–2007: Corinthians

Senior career*
Years	Team	Apps	(Gls)
2007–2008	Pogoń Szczecin	8	(0)
2008	Senec	11	(4)
2009–2013	Tatran Prešov	65	(30)
2010	→ Zemplín Michalovce (loan)	15	(9)
2012	→ Příbram (loan)	17	(8)
2013–2014	St. George	20	(5)
2014	SHB Đà Nẵng	14	(11)
2015	Than Quảng Ninh	22	(17)
2015	Al Shorta	4	(1)
2016–2017	Teuta Durrës	19	(6)
2018	Phrae United	0	(0)
2019	Nakhon Pathom United	4	(1)
2019	Nara United	6	(6)
2020	Ranong United	13	(3)
2020–2021	Chiangmai	16	(5)
2021–2022	Muang Loei United	10	(2)
2022	Samutsongkhram	11	(9)
2023	Nakhon Pathom United	14	(2)
2023–2024	Phatthalung	26	(19)
2024	Udon United	7	(2)
2025–	Songkhla	11	(4)
- * Club domestic league appearances and goals as of 24 June 2025

Jhonatan Mariano Bernardo (born 7 November 1988 in São Paulo) is a Brazilian football striker who plays for Songkhla in the Thai League 2.

== Honour ==
Nakhon Pathom United

- Thai League 2: 2022–23
