= Mitsada Saitaifah =

Laotian footballer (born 1987)

Personal information
- Date of birth: 25 January 1987 (age 39)
- Place of birth: Saint-Amand-Montrond, France
- Height: 1.79 m (5 ft 10 in)
- Position: Center back

Team information
- Current team: Yala
- Number: 7

Senior career*
Years	Team	Apps	(Gls)
2008–2012	Romorantin	58+	(3+)
2012–2013	Bourges 18	21	(1)
2013–2014	Fontenay	19	(0)
2014–2015	Le Puy Foot	32	(1)
2016	Lanexang United		
2018–2020	Pattani	39	(7)
2021–2022	Satun United	20	(3)
2022	Young Singh Hatyai United	8	(3)
2023–2024	Phatthalung	26	(6)
2024	Muang Loei United	9	(0)
2025	Satun	8	(0)
2025–	Yala	12	(1)

International career
2021–	Laos	4	(0)
- * Club domestic league appearances and goals as of 24 November 2025

Mitsada Saitaifah (born 25 January 1987) is a footballer who plays as a center back. Born in France, he represents the Laos national team.

== Career ==
In 2008, Saitaifah signed for French fourth tier side Romorantin. In 2012, he signed for Bourges 18 in the French fifth tier. In 2013, he signed for French fourth tier club Fontenay. In 2015, Saitaifah signed for Le Puy Foot in the French fifth tier, helping them earn promotion to the French fourth tier.

Before the 2016 season, he signed for Laotian team Lanexang United. Before the 2018 season, he signed for Pattani in the Thai fourth tier, helping them earn promotion to the Thai third tier. In 2021, Saitaifah signed for Thai third tier outfit Satun United.
