= Tommy O'Sullivan =

Welsh footballer

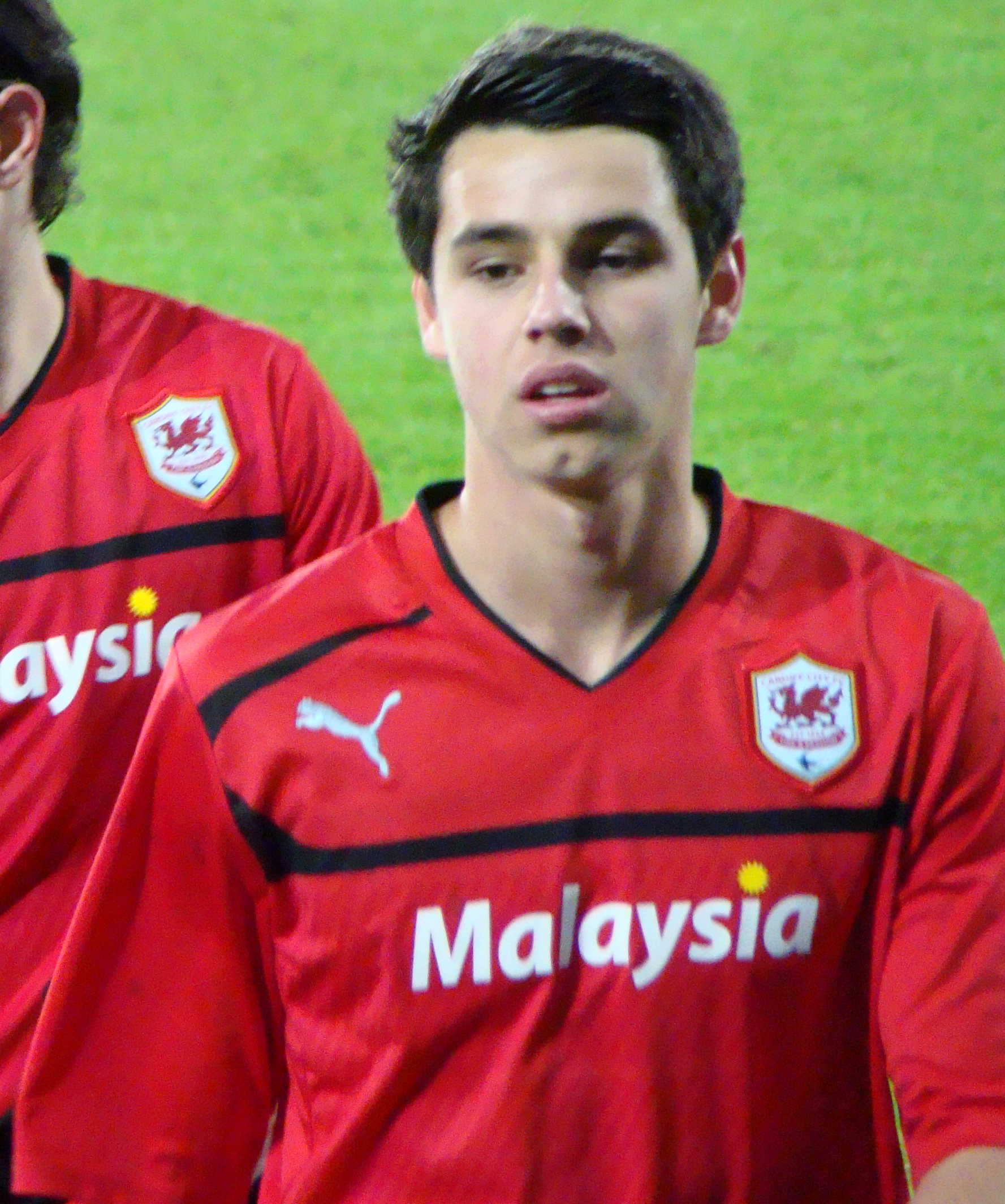
- O'Sullivan in a Cardiff City kit in February 2013

Personal information
- Full name: Thomas Paul O'Sullivan
- Date of birth: 18 January 1995 (age 31)
- Place of birth: Mountain Ash, Wales
- Height: 1.76 m (5 ft 9 in)
- Position: Midfielder

Team information
- Current team: Samui United
- Number: 10

Youth career
- 2004–2012: Cardiff City

Senior career*
Years	Team	Apps	(Gls)
2012–2017	Cardiff City	0	(0)
2015	→ Port Vale (loan)	1	(0)
2015	→ Port Vale (loan)	4	(0)
2015–2016	→ Newport County (loan)	11	(1)
2016	→ Newport County (loan)	9	(0)
2017–2018	Colchester United	4	(0)
2018	→ Torquay United (loan)	7	(0)
2018–2020	Hereford	51	(2)
2020–2023	Gloucester City	83	(2)
2023–2025	Brackley Town	71	(3)
2025–	Samui United		

International career
2011–2012	Wales U17	5	(0)
2013–2014	Wales U19	6	(6)
2013–2016	Wales U21	15	(3)
- * Club domestic league appearances and goals as of 14:32, 27 April 2025 (UTC)

Thomas Paul O'Sullivan (born 18 January 1995) is a Welsh professional footballer who plays for Thai League 3 club Samui United.

A Wales youth international, O'Sullivan began his professional career with Cardiff City in 2012, making his debut in the League Cup in August 2012. He made his English Football League debut on loan at Port Vale in February 2015. After two loan spells at Newport County during the 2015–16 season, he signed for Colchester United in January 2017. He joined Torquay United on loan for the remainder of the 2017–18 season in January 2018. Having been released by Colchester, he signed with Hereford in October 2018. He spent under two years with Hereford before moving to Gloucester City in August 2020. After three seasons with Gloucester, he moved on to Brackley Town. He won the National League North title with the club at the end of the 2024–25 season. He moved to Thailand to play for Samui United in August 2025.

== Club career ==
=== Cardiff City ===
Born in Mountain Ash, Rhondda Cynon Taf, O'Sullivan progressed through the Academy at Cardiff City to sign his first professional contract in 2012. He made his professional debut when he came on as a substitute for Stephen McPhail 19 minutes into a 2–1 League Cup defeat to Northampton Town at Sixfields Stadium on 14 August 2012. He also went on to make an FA Cup appearance on 5 January 2013, as City lost 2–1 to non-League side Macclesfield Town.

O'Sullivan joined League One side Port Vale on a one-month loan on 2 February 2015; manager Rob Page signed O'Sullivan to replace injured creative midfielder Louis Dodds, having been familiar with him from his time as a coach with the Welsh youth teams. He returned to Cardiff on 2 March after only one substitute appearance at Vale Park. Ten days later he was re-signed by Page on another one-month loan, after the departure of Chris Lines created a midfield vacancy in Vale's first-team picture. The loan deal was later extended to cover the rest of the 2014–15 season. He made five appearances for the Valiants.

On 5 October 2015, O'Sullivan was named as Welsh Young Player of the Year by the Football Association of Wales. Eight days later he joined Newport County on an initial one-month loan, subsequently extended until 7 January 2016. He made his debut on 17 October in 1–0 home defeat by Portsmouth, and on 24 October, he scored his first professional goal in Newport's 4–1 win at Bristol Rovers. In total he made 13 appearances for the club during the loan spell, which was not extended despite Cardiff manager Russell Slade being encouraged by O'Sullivan's progress. On 10 March 2016, O'Sullivan returned to Newport County on loan until the end of the 2015–16 season. He made a further nine appearances for County during his second spell.

=== Colchester United ===
After failing to make an impact on the Cardiff first-team during the 2016–17 season, O'Sullivan joined Colchester United on trial in January 2017, completing a transfer to the club for an undisclosed fee on 20 January 2017. He made his debut as a substitute for Drey Wright after 78-minutes of Colchester's 4–0 League Two win at home to Stevenage on 8 April. He made three first-team appearances in 2016–17.

On 4 January 2018, O'Sullivan signed for National League side Torquay United on loan until the end of the season. He made his debut two days later in a 4–0 defeat at Wrexham. He played a total of seven games for Gary Owers's "Gulls", who ended the season being relegated into the National League South. Upon his return to the Colchester Community Stadium at the end of the 2017–18 season he was released by manager John McGreal.

=== Hereford ===
On 25 October 2018, O'Sullivan signed with National League North side Hereford after a successful trial period at Edgar Street. He featured 31 times for the "Bulls" throughout the 2018–19 season. He was reunited with former Cardiff manager Russell Slade in September 2019 following Marc Richards' departure from the club. O'Sullivan's 96th-minute winner against Gateshead on 17 September secured Slade's first victory at Edgar Street. He scored two goals in 22 appearances in the 2019–20 season, which was permanently suspended on 26 March due to the COVID-19 pandemic in England, with Hereford in 15th-place.

=== Gloucester City ===
On 7 August 2020, O'Sullivan joined Hereford's National League North rivals Gloucester City, becoming manager James Rowe's fifth summer signing. He made 21 appearances before the 2020–21 season was curtailed due to the ongoing pandemic. He featured 36 times under Lee Mansell in the 2021–22 season, in what O'Sullivan called "a transitional time" at Meadow Park. He made 32 appearances in the 2022–23 campaign, including in the play-off quarter-final defeat at Brackley Town.

=== Brackley Town ===
On 26 June 2023, O'Sullivan signed with Brackley Town upon the expiry of his contract with Gloucester. He played 38 league games in the 2023–24 season to help Brackley to secure a play-off place with a third-place finish. He played in the play-off final defeat to Boston United. He scored two goals in 37 matches throughout the 2024–25 season as Brackley secured promotion as champions of the National League North; manager Gavin Cowan said the team had accomplished "something extraordinary" in reaching the National League for the first time in the club's history. He left the club at the end of his contract as he felt "that he needs guarantees at this stage of his career and that he needs every minute on the pitch".

=== Samui United ===
On 21 August 2025, O'Sullivan signed with Thai League 3 club Samui United. He coached at The International School of Samui in October 2025.

== International career ==
O'Sullivan has represented Wales at under-17, under-19 and under-21 level. He made his competitive debut for the under-17s starting in a 3–2 defeat to Armenia on 17 October 2011. He made five appearances for the under-17 side. On 13 November 2013, he had a goalscoring debut for the under-19 team, featuring as a substitute in Wales' 5–1 defeat to Georgia. He scored six goals in six appearances for the under-19 team. Prior to his under-19 debut, O'Sullivan had already made his under-21 debut, starting in their 4–0 victory over San Marino on 15 October 2013. For his first goals at under-21 level, he scored a brace against Bulgaria during a 3–1 win on 31 March 2015. He scored three goals in 15 competitive under-21 games between 2013 and 2016.

== Style of play ==
O'Sullivan is a box-to-box midfielder who records statistics in passing accuracy and spatial awareness.

== Coaching career ==
In 2022, he was coaching in the academy at Cardiff City.

== Personal life ==
Tommy's elder brother, Sam O'Sullivan, played 152 times for Newport County before leaving the club in 2008.

== Career statistics ==
As of match played 26 April 2025

Appearances and goals by club, season and competition
Club	Season	League			FA Cup		League Cup		Other		Total	
Club	Season	Division	Apps	Goals	Apps	Goals	Apps	Goals	Apps	Goals	Apps	Goals
Cardiff City	2012–13	Championship	0	0	1	0	1	0	—		2	0
Cardiff City	2013–14	Premier League	0	0	0	0	0	0	—		0	0
Cardiff City	2014–15	Championship	0	0	0	0	1	0	—		1	0
Cardiff City	2015–16	Championship	0	0	0	0	0	0	—		0	0
Cardiff City	2016–17	Championship	0	0	0	0	0	0	—		0	0
Cardiff City	Total		0	0	1	0	2	0	0	0	3	0
Port Vale (loan)	2014–15	League One	5	0	—		—		—		5	0
Newport County (loan)	2015–16	League Two	20	1	2	0	—		—		22	1
Colchester United	2016–17	League Two	3	0	—		—		—		3	0
Colchester United	2017–18	League Two	1	0	1	0	0	0	2 (Note: Appearances in 2017–18 EFL Trophy)	0	4	0
Colchester United	Total		4	0	1	0	0	0	2	0	7	0
Torquay United (loan)	2017–18	National League	7	0	—		—		0	0	7	0
Hereford	2018–19	National League North	29	0	0	0	—		2 (Note: Appearances in 2018–19 FA Trophy)	0	31	0
Hereford	2019–20	National League North	22	2	0	0	—		0	0	22	2
Hereford	Total		51	2	0	0	—		2	0	53	2
Gloucester City	2020–21	National League North	18	1	0	0	—		3 (Note: Appearances in 2020–21 FA Trophy)	0	21	1
Gloucester City	2021–22	National League North	35	1	0	0	—		1 (Note: Appearances in 2021–22 FA Trophy)	0	36	1
Gloucester City	2022–23	National League North	30	0	0	0	—		2 (Note: 1 appearances in 2022–23 FA Trophy and 1 appearance in the play-offs)	0	32	0
Gloucester City	Total		83	2	0	0	—		6	0	89	2
Brackley Town	2023–24	National League North	38	1	0	0	—		3 (Note: 1 appearance in 2023–24 FA Trophy and 2 appearances in play-offs)	0	41	1
Brackley Town	2024–25	National League North	33	2	3	0	—		1 (Note: Appearances in 2024–25 FA Trophy)	0	37	2
Brackley Town	Total		71	3	3	0	0	0	4	0	78	3
Career total			241	8	7	0	2	0	14	0	264	8

== Honours ==
Brackley Town:

- National League North: 2024–25

Individual

- Football Association of Wales Young Player of the Year: 2014–15
