= F.C. Yala =

Thai football club

Yala ยะลา
- Full name: Football Club Yala สโมสรฟุตบอลยะลา
- Nicknames: The Jigsaw (จิ๊กซอว์รวมใจ)
- Founded: 2018; 8 years ago, as Jalor City Football Club; 2023; 3 years ago, as Football Club Yala
- Ground: Yala Municipality Stadium; Yala, Thailand
- Capacity: 3,000
- Owner(s): F.C. Yala Football Club Part., Ltd.
- Chairman: Muhammad Asmi Abu Bakr
- Head coach: Adun Muensamaan
- League: Thai League 3
- 2025–26: Thai League 3, 3rd of 10 in the Southern region

Football Club Yala (Thai สโมสรฟุตบอลยะลา), is a football club based in Yala, Thailand. The club is currently playing in the Thai League 3 Southern region.

== History ==
The club was formed and registered on 4 August 2018 in Yala as the southernmost football club in Thailand. It initially competed in Thailand Amateur League Southern region. They were promoted to Thai League 4 in the end of season.

In 2019, the club competed in Thai League 4 Southern region and finished in the 5th place. In 2022, Jalor City competed in the Thai League 3. The club started the season with a 0–1 away defeat to Trang and they ended the season with a 2–0 home win over the same rival. The club has finished 10th in the Southern region. In the 2022–23 Thai FA Cup Jalor City was defeated 0–3 by Rajpracha in the second round. In the 2022–23 Thai League Cup Jalor City was defeated 0–1 by Phatthalung in the first qualification round. In 2023, Jalor City was renamed to Yala.

== Stadium and locations ==
Coordinates	Location	Stadium	Year
6°34′41″N 101°17′50″E	Yala	Yala Municipality Stadium	2018 – present

== Season by season record ==
Season	League									FA Cup	League Cup	T3 Cup	Top goalscorer	
Season	Division	P	W	D	L	F	A	Pts	Pos	FA Cup	League Cup	T3 Cup	Name	Goals
2018	TA South	3	2	1	0	8	1	7	1st	Opted out	Ineligible		(Thailand) Fadhil Malee	6
2019	T4 South	24	5	9	10	20	31	24	5th	Opted out	QR1		(Thailand) Muhammadsalfadee Jehteh (Thailand) Suttichai Doungead	4
2020–21	T3 South	17	6	4	7	20	24	22	7th	Opted out	QR1		(Thailand) Ayu Lateh	10
2021–22	T3 South	24	7	11	6	25	30	32	7th	Opted out	Opted out		(Thailand) Pithak Abdulrahman	9
2022–23	T3 South	22	4	9	9	15	24	21	10th	R2	QR1		(Thailand) Sakeereen Teekasom	4
2023–24	T3 South	22	5	8	9	14	20	23	8th	Opted out	Opted out	R1	(Egypt) Abdelaziz Said El Shaer (Thailand) Jehhanafee Mamah	3
2024–25	T3 South	22	9	8	5	19	15	35	3rd	Opted out	Opted out	Opted out	(Thailand) Adam Lassamano	4
2025–26	T3 South	18	10	6	2	28	14	36	3rd	R1	QRP	LP	(Thailand) Somprat Reuengnun	7

Champions	Runners-up	Promoted	Relegated

- P = Played
- W = Games won
- D = Games drawn
- L = Games lost
- F = Goals for
- A = Goals against
- Pts = Points
- Pos = Final position
- QR1 = First Qualifying Round
- QR2 = Second Qualifying Round
- R1 = Round 1
- R2 = Round 2
- R3 = Round 3
- R4 = Round 4
- R5 = Round 5
- R6 = Round 6
- QF = Quarter-finals
- SF = Semi-finals
- RU = Runners-up
- W = Winners

== Players ==
=== Current squad ===
As of 1 October 2025

Note: Flags indicate national team as defined under FIFA eligibility rules; some limited exceptions apply. Players may hold more than one non-FIFA nationality.

No.	Pos.	Nation	Player
1	GK	THA	Fadel Baka
2	DF	THA	Dusit Nongpratum
4	DF	THA	Thanaphat Ketmueang
6	DF	THA	Najwa Cheni
7	FW	LAO	Mitsada Saitaifah
8	MF	THA	Sulkiplee Jisahwat
10	MF	THA	Adam Lassamano
11	MF	THA	Siriphong Wangkulam
14	DF	THA	Alif Teemung
17	FW	THA	Fahal Bilteh
18	DF	THA	Mayunan Yaena
19	FW	BRA	Natan Oliveira

No.	Pos.	Nation	Player
20	MF	THA	Sarin Hayeedoloh
25	GK	THA	Amran Bungosayu
26	DF	THA	Noppasak Nunsri
29	FW	THA	Fairos Chemae
30	DF	THA	Sakareya Kolea
36	DF	THA	Muhammad Farut Muelohhamae
37	MF	THA	Khoiree Layeng
39	MF	THA	Sofron Sada
44	FW	THA	Panuwat Khunphet
45	DF	SWE	Alexandar Mutic
48	FW	THA	Jehhanafee Mamah
97	MF	THA	Amran Awae
98	GK	THA	Irhan Masae

== Coaching staff ==
Position	Name
Chairman	(Saudi Arabia) Muhammad Asmi Abu Bakr
Team manager	(Thailand) Azi Aza
Head coach	(Thailand) Nirun Atsawaphakdi
Assistant coach	(Thailand) Muntad Bilanglod
Goalkeeper coach	(Thailand) Alrifan Grootama
Fitness coach	
Match analyst	
