= Nara United F.C. =

Association football club in Thailand

Nara United นรา ยูไนเต็ด
- Full name: Nara United Football Club สโมสรฟุตบอลนรา ยูไนเต็ด
- Nicknames: The Kolae Warriors (กอและพิฆาต)
- Short name: NRUTD
- Founded: 2010; 16 years ago
- Ground: Narathiwat Provincial Administrative Organization Stadium; Narathiwat, Thailand
- Capacity: 7,000
- Owner(s): Narathiwat Korlaephikhart Football Club Co., Ltd.
- Chairman: Affan Hayiyusoh
- Head coach: Wasan Sungkhaphan
- League: Thai League 3
- 2025–26: Thai League 3, 1st of 12 (Southern region) (champions)
Home colours	Away colours

Nara United Football Club (Thai: สโมสรฟุตบอลนรา ยูไนเต็ด) is a Thai professional football club based in Narathiwat province. The club is currently playing in the Thai League 2 from 2026–27 after promotion from Thai League 3 Southern region in 2025–26. They lifted the league division 2 southern zone and Super Champion Cup title in 2010. Nara United rivalries included Satun United and Yala F.C.

== History ==
=== The early years ===
Nara United was established from the football club of Sports Association of Narathiwat Province. They first participated in the Football Cup in National Games Tournament. In the year 2006, the club joined the Thailand Professional League under name of Narathiwat Football Club, and in 2011 the club joined the Regional League Division 2 Southern as Nara United.

=== First major successes ===
In 2009 they won the gold medal in the National Games 38th title at Trang province by beating Ratchaburi 1–0 at the Trang Central Stadium. They moved to Regional League Division 2 Southern in the 2011 season. The Kolak Boat Warriors finished 7th in the First leg of Thai League division 2 southern zone 2011. In 2010 they were invited to play in the Super Champion Cup and reached the final, defeating the likes of Phitsanulok, Ayutthaya and Kasem Bundit University along the way. In the final they won against Chiangrai United 3–0. In 2010 they were again invited to participate in the 39th National Games at Chonburi province, but were defeated in the semi-final against Chonburi F.C. 1–2.

=== Regional League Division 2 south ===
Nara United played in the first Regional League Division 2 south in 2011. On March 3, 2011, the club achieved its first victory against Chumphon. In 2022, Nara United competed in the Thai League 3. The club started the season with a 1–1 away draw with Mueang Kon D United and they ended the season with a 5–0 home win over Mueang Kon D United. The club has finished 5th place in the league of the Southern region. In the 2022–23 Thai FA Cup Nara United was defeated 0–2 by Kasem Bundit University in the first round.

On 30 May 2026, Nara United secure promotion to Thai League 2 for the first time in their history from next season after defeat PT Satun on aggregate 1–5.

On 9 July 2026, FIB confirms the club failed to meet the club licensing requirements for Thai League 2 and Muang Loei United secure promotion to Thai League 2 instead.

== Stadium ==
At the start of the Regional League Division 2 Southern, Nara United used the Bangnara Arena Stadium or Narathiwat Municipality Stadium for the first half of the season, but due to a dispute with the local authority, in 2011 they moved back to Nara Forest Side Stadium or Narathiwat Provincial Administrative Organization Stadium.

== Supporters ==
Supporters of Nara United are often referred to as the Kolak Mania which refers to the Kolak boat symbol of the club.

== Honours ==
=== Domestic leagues ===
- Thai League 3
  - Winners (1): 2025–26
- Thai League 3 Southern Region
  - Winners (1): 2025–26
- Regional League South Division
  - Winners (2) : 2009, 2013

=== Friendly competitions ===
- Thailand National Games
  - Gold medal (1) : 2009
  - Silver medal (1) : 2006
  - bronze medal (1) : 2010
- Super Champions Cup
  - Winners (1) : 2010
- Sungai Kolok Cup
  - Winners (1): 2011
- S'5 Unity League
  - Runners-up (1): 2008
- S'5 Unity Youth cup U-20
  - Winners (3): 2007, 2008, 2009
  - Runners-up (1): 2010
- Southern royal shield Trophy 2009 (Phangga Cup)
  - Winners (1): 2009

== Stadium and locations ==
Coordinates	Location	Stadium	Capacity	Year
6°25′21″N 101°49′09″E	Narathiwat	Narathiwat Municipal Stadium	?	2007
6°25′31″N 101°48′21″E	Narathiwat	Narathiwat Province Stadium (Narathiwat PAO. Stadium)	?	2008–2009
6°25′21″N 101°49′09″E	Narathiwat	Narathiwat Municipal Stadium	?	2010
6°25′31″N 101°48′21″E	Narathiwat	Narathiwat Province Stadium (Narathiwat PAO. Stadium)	?	2011
6°25′21″N 101°49′09″E	Narathiwat	Narathiwat Municipal Stadium	?	2012–2013
6°25′31″N 101°48′21″E	Narathiwat	Narathiwat Province Stadium (Narathiwat PAO. Stadium)	?	2014–

== Season by season record ==
Season	League									FA Cup	League Cup	T3 Cup	Top goalscorer	
Season	Division	P	W	D	L	F	A	Pts	Pos	FA Cup	League Cup	T3 Cup	Name	Goals
2006	Pro League	30	13	6	11	37	34	45	5th	Opted out				
2007	DIV1 A	22	7	6	9	31	28	27	8th	Opted out				
2008	DIV2 A	20	10	7	3	26	17	37	3rd	Opted out				
2009	DIV2 South	14	10	4	0	37	10	34	1st	Opted out				
2010	DIV1	30	4	3	23	16	64	15	16th	Opted out	Opted out			
2011	DIV2 South	24	8	8	8	35	23	32	8th	Opted out	Opted out			
2012	DIV2 South	24	8	8	8	35	23	32	8th	Opted out	Opted out			
2013	DIV2 South	20	11	8	1	32	7	41	1st	Opted out	Opted out			
2014	DIV2 South	24	10	7	7	28	24	37	6th	Opted out	Opted out			
2015	DIV2 South	18	4	10	4	20	19	22	6th	R2	QR2			
2016	DIV2 South	22	12	5	5	35	17	41	2nd	R2	QR1			
2017	T3 Lower	28	11	11	6	39	28	44	5th	Opted out	Opted out		(Ivory Coast) Ouattara Zana Brahima	10
2018	T3 Lower	26	13	11	2	45	18	50	2nd	QF	QR1		(South Korea) Jung Jung-yu	14
2019	T3 Lower	26	11	11	4	42	26	44	3rd	Opted out	Opted out		(Brazil) Jhonatan Bernardo (Thailand) Pthak Abdulraman	10
2020–21	T3 South	17	9	4	4	30	15	31	3rd	Opted out	QR2		(Thailand) Manso Ausman (Thailand) Fairos Chemae	5
2021–22	T3 South	24	12	6	6	38	26	42	4th	Opted out	Opted out		(Thailand) Sukree Etae	8
2022–23	T3 South	22	9	6	7	30	27	33	5th	R1	Opted out		(Thailand) Somnuek Kaewarporn	5
2023–24	T3 South	22	9	4	9	25	25	31	7th	Opted out	Opted out	Opted out	(Thailand) Manso Ausman, (Thailand) Fairos Chemae, (Thailand) Somnuek Kaewarporn	3
2024–25	T3 South	22	8	10	4	24	19	34	4th	R1	R1	Opted out	(Brazil) Caio da Conceição Silva	13
2025–26	T3 South	18	14	1	3	39	10	43	1st	R1	QR2	LP	(Brazil) Lucas Grossi	18

Champions	Runners-up	Promoted	Relegated

== Players ==
=== Current squad ===
As of 25 March 2026

Note: Flags indicate national team as defined under FIFA eligibility rules; some limited exceptions apply. Players may hold more than one non-FIFA nationality.

No.	Pos.	Nation	Player
2	DF	THA	Nattapong Phephat
4	DF	THA	Thanawut Klinsukon
5	DF	THA	Anas Dulyaseree
6	MF	THA	Kuwa-El Yaworhasan
8	MF	THA	Ahamarasul Duereh
9	FW	BRA	Pedrão
10	FW	CUW	Elson Hooi
14	FW	THA	Marwan Yakoh
16	MF	THA	Alef Poh-ji
17	DF	THA	Rakpong Chumuang
18	GK	THA	Chonlathan Samaelae
19	DF	THA	Wichitchai Chauyseenual
23	MF	THA	Chitpanya Tisud
24	DF	THA	Salman Waesuemae
27	MF	THA	Aubaidullah Chemae
28	MF	THA	Hamdee Binmudo
29	MF	THA	Mayunan Yaena
33	DF	THA	Anukorn Sangrum

No.	Pos.	Nation	Player
48	DF	THA	Asru Binmamu
50	DF	THA	Ah-mad Tohtaba
57	MF	THA	Faddru Diyaulislam
62	FW	BRA	Lucas Grossi
77	FW	THA	Thanawat Srisawat
80	GK	THA	Ribuwan Akeh
88	MF	THA	Somnuek Kaewarporn (Captain)
—	DF	THA	Ekkasit Chaobut
—	GK	THA	Samuel Cunningham
—	MF	THA	Wanchalerm Yingyong
—	FW	THA	Nattapon Thaptanon
—	GK	THA	Siwapong Phankaeo
—	DF	THA	Kritapat Vichaidit
—	DF	THA	Tanakorn Navanich
—	DF	BRA	Roni Santos
—	DF	THA	Fittaree Khadearee
—	MF	THA	Muhammadsaputro Doni

== Affiliated clubs ==
- (Thailand) Chonburi F.C.
- (Thailand) Thai Port F.C.
- (Thailand) Pattani F.C.
- (Malaysia) Kelantan FA
- (Malaysia) Kedah FA
