= PSU Surat Thani City F.C. =

Thai football club

PSU Surat Thani City พีเอสยู สุราษฎร์ธานี ซิตี้
- Full name: PSU Surat Thani City Football Club สโมสรฟุตบอลพีเอสยู สุราษฎร์ธานี ซิตี้
- Nicknames: The Killer Arowanas (ตะพัดพิฆาต)
- Founded: 2010; 16 years ago (as Kabin Buri)
- Ground: Wiang Sa Subdistrict Municipality Stadium; Surat Thani, Thailand
- Capacity: 3,000
- Owner(s): Surat Thani City Football Club Co., Ltd.
- Chairman: Supachai Rittisaman
- Manager: Supawit Rittisaman
- Coach: Atitthan Kongsarp
- League: Thai League 3
- 2025–26: Thai League 3, 5th of 10 in the Southern region

PSU Surat Thani City Football Club (Thai: สโมสรฟุตบอลพีเอสยู สุราษฎร์ธานี ซิตี้) is a Thai football club based in Wiang Sa, Surat Thani Province. The club currently plays in the Thai League 3 Southern region.

== History ==
The club established in 2010 as Kabin Buri Football Club.

In 2017, Kabin Buri Football Club was taken over by a group of funds from Surat Thani and moved to Surat Thani Province and changed its name to Surat Thani City Football Club.

In 2021, Surat Thani City Football Club was taken over by My Home Development group and renamed to MH Khon-Surat City Football Club.

In 2022, MH Khon Surat City Football Club was renamed Wiang Sa Surat Thani City Football Club after changing its name to MH Nakhonsi City Football Club. Wiang Sa Surat Thani City competed in the Thai League 3 for the 2022–23 season. It is their 6th season in the professional league. The club started the season with a 0–2 away defeat to Songkhla and they ended the season with a 0–0 home draw with Songkhla. The club has finished 8th place in the league of the Southern region.

== Stadium and locations ==
Coordinates	Location	Stadium	Year
13°59′20″N 101°43′25″E	Prachinburi	Nom Klao Maharaj Stadium	2010–2012
14°00′48″N 101°41′58″E	Prachinburi	Sahapat Group Kabinburi Football Field	2016
8°37′59″N 99°22′30″E	Surat Thani	Wiang Sa Subdistrict Municipality Stadium	2017
9°08′06″N 99°20′51″E	Surat Thani	Surat Thani Province Stadium	2017
8°39′43″N 99°22′32″E	Surat Thani (Wiang Sa)	Ban Song Municipality Stadium	2018-

== Season by season record ==
Season	League									FA Cup	League Cup	T3 Cup	Top goalscorer	
Season	Division	P	W	D	L	F	A	Pts	Pos	FA Cup	League Cup	T3 Cup	Name	Goals
2010	Central-East	30	3	5	22	25	77	14	15th	Opted out	Opted out			
2011	Central-East	30	5	6	19	26	76	21	15th	Opted out	Opted out			
2012	Central-East	33	1	5	27	15	80	8	18th	Opted out	Opted out			
2016	Bangkok-East	18	4	2	12	15	29	14	10th	Opted out	QR1			
2017	T4 South	24	4	3	17	17	40	15	8th	Opted out	Opted out			
2018	T4 South	21	4	7	10	18	31	19	6th	Opted out	Opted out			
2019	T4 South	24	11	9	4	39	26	42	3rd	R3	R2		(Nigeria) Julius Chukwuma Ononiwu	14
2020–21	T3 South	17	5	5	7	17	23	20	8th	QR	Opted out		(Georgia (country)) Giorgi Tsimakuridze	5
2021–22	T3 South	24	12	4	8	28	18	40	5th	R1	QR2		(Mali) Toloba Aremu Kassim Mouyidine	8
2022–23	T3 South	22	6	7	9	24	28	25	8th	Opted out	Opted out		(Thailand) Kritsada Jarujreet	4
2023–24	T3 South	22	10	2	10	31	32	32	6th	R2	QR2	QR2	(Thailand) Natthawut Aiamchan	12
2024–25	T3 South	22	7	8	7	30	26	29	8th	QR	QRP	LP	(Brazil) Josimar	8
2025–26	T3 South	18	8	7	3	29	24	31	5th	R1	QRP	LP	(Thailand) Teerawat Durnee	10

== Players ==
=== Current squad ===
As of 1 October 2024

Note: Flags indicate national team as defined under FIFA eligibility rules; some limited exceptions apply. Players may hold more than one non-FIFA nationality.

No.	Pos.	Nation	Player
1	GK	THA	Tharathep Thomusor
2	DF	BRA	Josimar
5	DF	THA	Siraphop Tanprasit
7	DF	THA	Natthakit Keawphutpong
8	FW	THA	Rattasart Makasoot
9	MF	THA	Worawut Sisahwat
10	FW	THA	Natthawut Aiamchan
11	MF	THA	Panupong Sa-nguannam
14	DF	THA	Sinchai Bumpen
16	MF	MYA	Phyo Min Latt
17	FW	THA	Chonnasit Hemmaraj
19	FW	THA	Kritsada Jarujreet
20	MF	MLI	Toloba Aremu Kassim Mouyidine
21	GK	THA	Apidat Chotchuang

No.	Pos.	Nation	Player
22	GK	THA	Kasemsan Chaiphakdee
27	DF	THA	Vorawut Thongnumkaew
28	MF	THA	Amnuai Nueaoon
29	DF	THA	Phongphan Srikate
35	DF	THA	Sarawut Chitthai
41	DF	THA	Pannawat Suwasen
42	DF	THA	Suwit Hamsalahmad
46	FW	THA	Thanakim Ketnakhon
47	DF	THA	Adinan Mongman
48	DF	THA	Pakawat Taengoakson
49	DF	THA	Kroekphon Phondongnok
55	FW	THA	Aphiwat Sukwinai
77	DF	THA	Faiso Chemoh
89	DF	THA	Tanawujt Sutthinun

== See also ==
- Surat Thani F.C.
- Kabin City F.C.
- Kabin United F.C.
