= Ranong PJ United F.C. =

Ranong PJ United ระนอง พีเจ ยูไนเต็ด
- Full name: Ranong PJ United Football Club
- Nicknames: The Andaman Sharks (ฉลามอันดามัน)
- Founded: 2010; 16 years ago
- Ground: Ranong Province Stadium; Ranong, Thailand
- Capacity: 7,000
- Coordinates: 9°57′35″N 98°38′25″E
- Chairman: Waranon Kloensin
- Head coach: Nuttawut Rattanaporn
- League: Thai League 3
- 2025–26: Thai League 3, 9th of 10 in the Southern region
- Website: Facebook

Ranong PJ United Football Club (Thai: สโมสรฟุตบอล ระนอง พีเจ ยูไนเต็ด), is a Thai professional football club based in Mueang, Ranong, Thailand. The club is currently playing in the Thai League 3 Southern region.

== History ==
The club entered the Regional League Division 2 Southern Region in 2010, competing as Ranong FC. In their inaugural season, Ranong finished third in the Southern Region, narrowly missing qualification for the promotion play-offs. The club was also known by the nickname "Andaman Sharks".

Following the restructuring of the Thai football league system, Ranong competed in the newly established Thai League 3 from 2017. During this period, the club competed under the name Grand Andaman Ranong United. The club finished seventh in the Thai League 3 Lower Region in 2017 and ninth in 2018.

The 2019 season was the most successful in the club's history at the time. Ranong finished second in the Thai League 3 Lower Region and entered the promotion play-offs for the Thai League 2. The club also reached the quarter-finals of the 2019 Thai League Cup, becoming the only Thai League 3 club to reach the quarter-finals that season. Ranong defeated PTT Rayong and Sukhothai in the preceding rounds before being eliminated by Nongbua Pitchaya on penalties following a 1–1 draw.

Ranong subsequently gained promotion to the Thai League 2 for the 2020 season after the league confirmed its promotion following the withdrawal of several clubs. The club spent three seasons in the Thai League 2, finishing eighth in 2020–21 and twelfth in 2021–22. In the 2022–23 season, Ranong finished seventeenth and were relegated to the Thai League 3.

After returning to the Thai League 3 Southern Region, Ranong finished eleventh in 2023–24, tenth in 2024–25 and ninth in 2025–26.

Ahead of the 2026–27 season, the club adopted the name Ranong PJ United, with the new name and branding announced through the club's official social media channels. The club continues to compete in the Thai League 3 Southern Region.

== Stadium and locations ==
| Coordinates | Location | Stadium | Year |
|---|---|---|---|
| 9°57′35″N 98°38′25″E | Mueang, Ranong | Ranong Province Stadium | 2010 – present |

== Season by season record ==
| Season | League | | | | | | | | | FA Cup | League Cup | T3 Cup | Top goalscorer | |
| Season | Division | P | W | D | L | F | A | Pts | Pos | FA Cup | League Cup | T3 Cup | Name | Goals |
|---|---|---|---|---|---|---|---|---|---|---|---|---|---|---|
| 2010 | DIV2 South | 24 | 10 | 8 | 6 | 31 | 29 | 38 | 3rd | Opted out | Opted out | | | |
| 2011 | DIV2 South | 24 | 9 | 6 | 9 | 20 | 24 | 33 | 7th | Opted out | Opted out | | | |
| 2012 | DIV2 South | 20 | 5 | 4 | 11 | 13 | 26 | 19 | 9th | Opted out | Opted out | | | |
| 2013 | DIV2 South | 20 | 3 | 5 | 12 | 14 | 30 | 14 | 11th | Opted out | Opted out | | | |
| 2014 | DIV2 South | 24 | 5 | 10 | 9 | 30 | 39 | 25 | 8th | Opted out | Opted out | | | |
| 2015 | DIV2 South | 18 | 6 | 6 | 6 | 18 | 19 | 24 | 5th | R2 | QR1 | | | |
| 2016 | DIV2 South | 22 | 9 | 8 | 5 | 21 | 19 | 35 | 4th | Opted out | QR1 | | | |
| 2017 | T3 Lower | 28 | 12 | 6 | 10 | 36 | 34 | 42 | 7th | R1 | QR1 | | (Ivory Coast) Sanou Oumar | 16 |
| 2018 | T3 Lower | 26 | 9 | 4 | 13 | 30 | 33 | 31 | 9th | Opted out | QF | | (Republic of the Congo) Burnel Okana-Stazi | 9 |
| 2019 | T3 Lower | 26 | 14 | 8 | 4 | 45 | 20 | 50 | 2nd | Opted out | Opted out | | (Japan) Tomohiro Onodera | 13 |
| 2020–21 | T2 | 34 | 16 | 5 | 13 | 45 | 39 | 53 | 8th | R1 | Opted out | | (Iraq) Selwan Al Jaberi | 8 |
| 2021–22 | T2 | 34 | 10 | 11 | 13 | 35 | 45 | 41 | 12th | Opted out | Opted out | | (South Korea) Yeon Gi-sung | 6 |
| 2022–23 | T2 | 34 | 6 | 9 | 19 | 28 | 64 | 27 | 17th | Opted out | Opted out | | (Nigeria) Julius Chukwuma Ononiwu | 9 |
| 2023–24 | T3 South | 22 | 3 | 6 | 13 | 14 | 46 | 15 | 11th | Opted out | QR2 | Opted out | (Japan) Yuto Yoshijima, (Thailand) Mesanan Yala | 3 |
| 2024–25 | T3 South | 22 | 6 | 3 | 13 | 18 | 29 | 21 | 10th | Opted out | Opted out | Opted out | (Egypt) Abdelrahman Osama Mohamed | 5 |
| 2025–26 | T3 South | 18 | 2 | 4 | 12 | 10 | 36 | 10 | 9th | Opted out | Opted out | Opted out | (Thailand) Ratthaphong Cheaaem, (Thailand) Suphachai Phuthong | 2 |

| Champions | Runners-up | Promoted | Relegated |

== Players ==
=== Current squad ===
Note: Flags indicate national team as defined under FIFA eligibility rules; some limited exceptions apply. Players may hold more than one non-FIFA nationality.

| No. | Pos. | Nation | Player |
|---|---|---|---|
| 2 | DF | THA | Chanchon Jomkao |
| 5 | DF | THA | Narongrit Wongsila |
| 6 | MF | THA | Wutthichai Samlee |
| 7 | DF | THA | Chamsuddeen Shoteng |
| 8 | MF | THA | Chanayut Jejue |
| 10 | MF | JPN | Yuto Yoshijima |
| 11 | DF | THA | Muhammadburhan Awae |
| 13 | FW | THA | Athiwat Hamarn |
| 15 | DF | THA | Thawatchai Jitwongsa |
| 16 | MF | THA | Sarin Hayeedoloh |
| 17 | MF | THA | Sitthichai Chimrueang |
| 18 | GK | THA | Taro Prasarnkarn |
| 19 | MF | THA | Saraphob Theerakul |

| No. | Pos. | Nation | Player |
|---|---|---|---|
| 21 | MF | THA | Tassanai Khumkrong |
| 23 | FW | THA | Phongsiri Ngoennu |
| 24 | DF | THA | Peerayut vichaidit |
| 29 | MF | THA | Wutthichai Samlee |
| 33 | FW | THA | Chartdanai Priksuwan |
| 37 | MF | THA | Wathit Nakkari |
| 39 | GK | THA | Nattapong Thongpum |
| 61 | MF | THA | Tanakorn Kraimanee |
| 63 | DF | THA | Charif Dalaemin |
| 71 | DF | THA | Sittichai Chimreang |
| 78 | DF | THA | Jakkapan fonthong |
| 86 | DF | THA | Chanchon Jomkao |
| 88 | DF | THA | Natchanon Soijit |

== Club staff ==
| Position | Name |
|---|---|
| Team manager | (Thailand) Aranya Phiboon |
| Head coach | (Thailand) Nuttawut Rattanaporn |
| Assistant coach | (Thailand) Santi Songtae |
| Goalkeeper coach | (Cameroon) Yongui Yannick |
| Technical director | (Brazil) Reuters Moreira |

== Affiliated clubs ==
- (Thailand) Buriram United F.C.
- (Thailand) PT Prachuap F.C.
