= Narathiwat Provincial Administrative Organization Stadium =

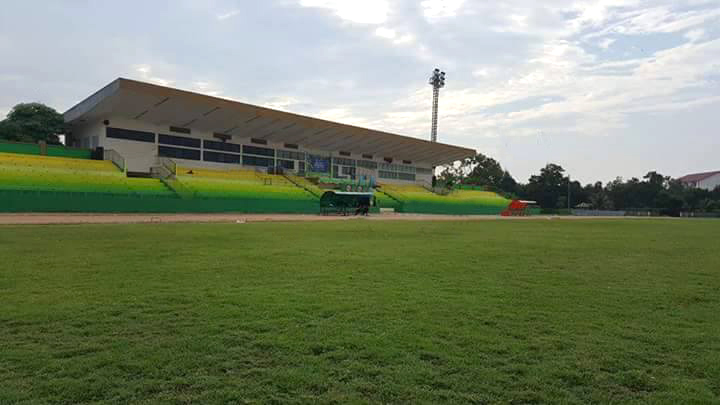
- Interactive map of Narathiwat Provincial Administrative Organization Stadium
- Location: Narathiwat, Thailand
- Coordinates: 6°25′31″N 101°48′21″E
- Capacity: 7,000
- Surface: Grass

Tenant
- Nara United F.C. (2009) (2011)

Narathiwat Provincial Administrative Organization Stadium (Thai: สนาม อบจ.นราธิวาส หรือ สนามกีฬาจังหวัดนราธิวาส) is a multi-purpose stadium in Narathiwat Province, Thailand. It is currently used mostly for football matches and is the home stadium of Nara United F.C. The stadium holds 7,000 people.
