= 2022–23 Thai League 2 =

Thai League 2
- Season: 2022–23
- Dates: 12 August 2022 – 27 May 2023
- Champions: Nakhon Pathom United
- Promoted: Nakhon Pathom United; Trat; Uthai Thani
- Relegated: Rajpracha; Ranong United; Udon Thani
- Matches: 306
- Goals: 757 (2.47 per match)
- Top goalscorer: Ricardo Santos (28 goals)
- Biggest home win: 7 goals difference Uthai Thani 8–1 Udon Thani (30 April 2023)
- Biggest away win: 8 goals difference Udon Thani 0–8 Trat (15 March 2023)
- Highest scoring: 9 goals difference Uthai Thani 8–1 Udon Thani (30 April 2023)
- Longest winning run: 8 matches Trat
- Longest unbeaten run: 9 matches Chiangmai United; Uthai Thani
- Longest winless run: 13 matches Ranong United
- Longest losing run: 6 matches Udon Thani
- Highest attendance: 3,125; Nakhon Si United 1–1 Trat (14 January 2023)
- Lowest attendance: 102; Rajpracha 0–0 Kasetsart (27 August 2022)
- Total attendance: 256,465
- Average attendance: 838
- All statistics correct as of 30 April 2023.

The 2022–23 Thai League 2 is the 25th season of the Thai League 2, the second-tier professional league for Thailand's association football clubs, since its establishment in 1997, also known as M-150 Championship due to the sponsorship deal with M-150. A total of 18 teams will compete in the league. The season began on 12 August 2022 and is scheduled to conclude on 27 May 2023.

For this season two teams in the final table (champion and runner up) directly promoted to Thai League 1 next season while teams ranked 3rd – 6th qualified in play off for last spot in top tier next season.

The 1st transfer window is from 25 May to 9 August 2022 while the 2nd transfer window is from 19 December 2022 to 17 January 2023.

== Team changes ==
The following teams have changed division since the 2022–23 season.

=== To Thai League 2 ===
Promoted from Thai League 3

- Uthai Thani
- Krabi
- Nakhon Si United

Relegated from Thai League 1

- Suphanburi
- Samut Prakan City
- Chiangmai United

=== From Thai League 2 ===
Promoted to Thai League 1

- Lamphun Warriors
- Sukhothai
- Lampang

Relegated to Thai League 3

- Khonkaen
- Navy

Relegated to Thailand Amateur League

- Muangkan United

=== Renamed Clubs ===
- Customs Ladkrabang United renamed to Customs United

== Teams ==
Locations of the 2022–23 Thai League 2 teams
Football clubs in Bangkok Metropolitan Region

== Stadium and locations ==
Team	Location	Stadium	Capacity
Ayutthaya United	Ayutthaya	Ayutthaya Provincial Stadium	6,000
Chainat Hornbill	Chai Nat	Khao Plong Stadium	8,625
Chiangmai	Chiang Mai	Chiangmai Municipality Stadium	5,000
Chiangmai United	Chiang Mai	700th Anniversary Stadium	25,000
Customs United	Samut Prakan	Customs Department Stadium, Ladkrabang 54	2,000
Kasetsart	Bangkok	Insee Chantarasatit Stadium	3,275
Krabi	Krabi	Krabi Provincial Stadium	6,000
Nakhon Pathom United	Nakhon Pathom	Nakhon Pathom Municipality Sport School Stadium	6,000
Nakhon Si United	Nakhon Si Thammarat	Nakhon Si Thammarat PAO. Stadium	5,000
Phrae United	Phrae	Huai Ma Stadium	3,000
Rajpracha	Bangkok	NT Stadium	3,000
Ranong United	Ranong	Ranong Provincial Stadium	7,000
Rayong	Rayong	Rayong Provincial Stadium	7,500
Samut Prakan City	Samut Prakan	Samut Prakarn SAT Stadium	5,130
Suphanburi	Suphanburi	Suphan Buri Provincial Stadium	15,279
Trat	Trat	Trat Provincial Stadium	5,000
Udon Thani	Udon Thani	Thai National Sports University Udon Thani Campus Stadium	5,000
Uthai Thani	Uthai Thani	Uthai Thani Provincial Stadium	4,477

=== Personnel ===
Note: Flags indicate national team as has been defined under FIFA eligibility rules. Players may hold more than one non-FIFA nationality; Club dissolved during season would shown by grey background.

Team	Head coach	Captain	Kit	Sponsor
Ayutthaya United	(Portugal) Bruno Pereira	(Thailand) Jakkapan Pornsai	Pegan Sport	Gulf, Chang
Chainat Hornbill	(Thailand) Pannarai Phansiri	(Thailand) Mongkonchai Kongjumpa	Warrix	Wangkanai; AirAsia; Kubota
Chiangmai	(Japan) Jun Fukuda	(Thailand) Suwannapat Kingkaew	Volt	Leo
Chiangmai United	(Brazil) Wanderley Junior	(Thailand) Sirisak Faidong	2S Sport	VBeyond; Muang Thai Life Assurance; Chang
Customs United	(Thailand) Jadet Meelarp	(Montenegro) Adnan Orahovac	Infinit	Leo; Muang Thai Life Assurance
Kasetsart	(Thailand) Anurak Srikerd	(Thailand) Mongkol Tossakrai	YG	Tanowsri Traditional Chicken; Atlantic
Krabi	(Thailand) Somchai Makmool	(Thailand) Akarat Punkaew	Wow	Phi Phi Harbour View Hotel
Nakhon Pathom United	(Thailand) Thongchai Sukkoki	(Thailand) Chokchai Chuchai	Made by club	Deedo; Chang
Nakhon Si United	(Thailand) Worrawoot Srimaka	(Thailand) Prakit Deeprom	Warrix	Akira; Navakitel
Phrae United	(Thailand) Thongchai Rungreangles	(Thailand) Nantapol Supathai	Grand Sport	Phrae Sila; SAMART
Rajpracha	(Thailand) Pattanapong Sripramote	(Thailand) Ronnachai Rangsiyo	Kelme	Coca-Cola; Bangkok Glass
Ranong United	(Thailand) Nuttawut Rattanaporn	(Thailand) Jennarong Phupha	Eureka	Grand Andaman; PTG; Leo
Rayong	(Thailand) Chusak Sriphum	(Thailand) Adisak Srikampang	Warrix	Singer; Leo; WHA Group
Samut Prakan City	(Thailand) Tana Chanabut	(Thailand) Saksit Jitvijan	FBT	Mittare Insurance; Chang
Suphanburi	(Thailand) Sataporn Wajakhum	(Thailand) Jetjinn Sriprach	Orca	Chang
Trat	(Thailand) Harnarong Chunhakunakorn	(Thailand) Pornpreecha Jarunai	Pan	PTT OR
Udon Thani	(Singapore) Akbar Nawas	(Thailand) Nattakrit Thongnoppakun	IAM	Muang Thai Life Assurance
Uthai Thani	(Thailand) Pattaraphon Naprasert	(Brazil) Ricardo Santos	Kelme	H well

=== Foreign Players ===
Players name in bold indicates the player was registered during the mid-season transfer window.

Club	Player 1	Player 2	Player 3	Asian Player	ASEAN Player	Former
Ayutthaya United	(Brazil) Nilson	(Brazil) Thiago Duchatsch	**(France) Simon Dia**	(Japan) Kazuki Murakami	(Myanmar) Sithu Aung	(Brazil) Gustavinho
Chainat Hornbill	(Brazil) Diego Silva	**(France) Greg Houla**	**(Brazil) Wellington Priori**	(South Korea) Kim Byung-oh		(Spain) Dennis Nieblas (South Korea) Choi Ho-ju
Chiangmai	(Serbia) Veljko Filipović	(South Korea) Kim Bo-yong	**(Chinese Taipei) Yuta Hirayama**	(South Korea) Lim Chang-gyoon	(Singapore) Ryhan Stewart	(Brazil) Stênio Júnior
Chiangmai United	**(Brazil) Deyvison Fernandes**	(Brazil) Evson Patrício	(Netherlands) Melvin de Leeuw	(Japan) Yuto Ono	(Philippines) **Iain Ramsay**	(Brazil) Bill (Philippines) Oliver Bias
Customs United	(Brazil) Alexandre Balotelli	(Montenegro) Adnan Orahovac	(Spain) David Cuerva	(Japan) Daisuke Sakai	**(Myanmar) Aung Kaung Mann**	(Philippines) Miguel Clarino
Kasetsart	(Brazil) Adalgisio Pitbull	(Brazil) Mateus Totô	**(Nigeria) Esoh Omogba**	(South Korea) Park Hyun-woo	**(Malaysia) Stuart Wark**	(South Korea) Kim Hong (Myanmar) Soe Moe Kyaw
Krabi	**(Iran) Hamed Bakhtiari**	**(South Korea) Choi Ho-ju**	(Nigeria) Chigozie Mbah	(Oman) Badar Al-Alawi	(Myanmar) Suan Lam Mang	(Brazil) Victor Oliveira (Brazil) Pedro Rodrigues
NakhonPathom Utd	(Norway) Peter Nergaard	**(Brazil) Jhonatan Bernardo**	**(Ghana) Sam Obed Kofi**	(Iran) Amirali Chegini	(Laos) Phithack Kongmathilath	(Egypt) Mohamed Essam (Iran) Abdolreza Zarei
Nakhon Si United	(Brazil) Evandro Paulista	(Brazil) Phillerson	(Croatia) Aleksandar Kapisoda	**(Afghanistan) Fareed Sadat**	**(Philippines) Mark Hartmann**	(South Korea) Kim Bong-jin (Myanmar) Nyein Chan Aung
Phrae United	(Brazil) Elivélton	(Brazil) Marlon Da Silva	(Brazil) Rodrigo Maranhão	(Japan) Taku Ito		
Rajpracha	**(Brazil) Danilo Oliveira**	(Mali) Mohamed Sidibe	(Brazil) Victor	**(Japan) Koki Narita**	**(Philippines) Pete Forrosuelo**	(Mali) Ibrahim Konaré (Mali) Makan Diawara
Ranong United	**(Brazil) Gabriel do Carmo**	(Nigeria) Julius Chukwuma	**(Iraq) Selwan Al-Jaberi**	(Japan) Yusaku Yamadera	(Myanmar) Aung Kyaw Naing	(Guinea) Barry Lelouma (Myanmar) Nyein Chan
Rayong	(Cameroon) Florent Obama	**(Brazil) Tiago Chulapa**	**(Brazil) Rafael Galhardo**	(Japan) Seiya Sugishita	(Myanmar) Lwin Moe Aung	(South Korea) Yeon Gi-sung (Japan) Anto Okamura
Samut Prakan City	**(Mali) Makan Diawara**	**(Mali) Mohamed Toure**	(Nigeria) Evans Aneni	(Japan) Sho Shimoji	**(Myanmar) Zon Moe Aung**	(Brazil) Renan Costa (Moldova) Petru Leucă (Nigeria) Evans Damian Aneni
Suphanburi	(Brazil) Douglas Tardin	(Brazil) Matheus Souza	**(Brazil) João Paulo**	(South Korea) Lee Jong-cheon		(Japan) Seiya Kojima
Trat	**(Egypt) Mohamed Essam**	(Brazil) Tãua Ferreira	(Brazil) Valdo	(Japan) Hiromichi Katano	(Laos) Soukaphone Vongchiengkham	(Brazil) João Paulo
Udon Thani	**(Brazil) Matheus Vieira da Silva**	(Germany) Arnold Suew	(Germany) Flodyn Baloki	**(Kyrgyzstan) Edgar Bernhardt**		(France) Greg Houla (South Korea) Jo Sang-bum (Myanmar) Aung Kaung Mann
Uthai Thani	**(Brazil) Brinner**	(Brazil) Ricardo Santos	**(Martinique) Steeven Langil**	(Japan) Kento Nagasaki	(Philippines) **Hikaru Minegishi**	(Brazil) Carlos Damian (Nigeria) Adefolarin Durosinmi (Malaysia) Zafuan Azeman

=== Dual citizenship/heritage players ===
Overseas Thai players whom have obtained a Thai passport are regarded as local players.

Club	Player 1	Player 2	Player 3	Player 4	Player 5	Player 6
Ayutthaya United	(Nigeria) (Thailand) **Immanuel Famy**^{2}					
Chainat Hornbill						
Chiangmai	(Switzerland) (Thailand) **Chitchanok Xaysensourinthone**^{2}	(England) (Thailand) **Louis Panmanee May**^{2}				
Chiangmai United						
Customs United	(Australia) (Thailand) **James Shanahan**^{2}	(Sweden) (Thailand) **Gustav Sahlin**^{2}				
Krabi						
NakhonPathom Utd	(Norway) (Thailand) **Athit Berg**^{2}	(Iran) (Thailand) **Saman Mohammadzadeh** ^{2}				
Nakhon Si United	(Italy) (Thailand) **Antonio Verzura**^{2}	(United States) (Thailand) **Samuel Cunningham**^{2}				
Phrae United						
Rajpracha						
Ranong United						
Rayong	(Germany) (Thailand) **Sattra Ratlongmaung**^{2}					
Samut Prakan City						
Suphanburi						
Trat	(Austria) (Thailand) **David Haas**^{2}					
Udon Thani						
Uthai Thani	(Japan) (Thailand) **Kitsada Otata**	(France) (Thailand) **Tony Laurent-Gonnet**^{2}				

Notes:

^2 Carrying Thai heritage.
^3 Capped for Thailand.

== League table ==
=== Standings ===
Pos	Team	Pld	W	D	L	GF	GA	GD	Pts	Qualification or relegation
1	Nakhon Pathom United (C, P)	34	16	12	6	32	20	+12	60 (Note: Nakhon Pathom United is ahead on the head-to-head points record; Nakhon Pathom United 6 pts, Trat 0 pts.)	Promotion to 2023–24 Thai League 1
2	Trat (P)	34	17	9	8	55	34	+21	60	Promotion to 2023–24 Thai League 1
3	Uthai Thani (O, P)	34	16	11	7	70	36	+34	59	Qualification for promotion play-offs
4	Customs United	34	17	7	10	45	31	+14	58	Qualification for promotion play-offs
5	Chiangmai United	34	15	9	10	36	32	+4	54	Qualification for promotion play-offs
6	Suphanburi	34	16	4	14	36	35	+1	52 (Note: Suphanburi is ahead on the head-to-head points record; Suphanburi 4 pts, Rayong 1 pt.)	Qualification for promotion play-offs
7	Rayong	34	14	10	10	41	30	+11	52	
8	Nakhon Si United	34	14	9	11	48	42	+6	51 (Note: The mini-league points record; Nakhon Si United 7 pts, Phrae United 5 pts, Ayutthaya United 4 pts.)	
9	Phrae United	34	13	12	9	50	43	+7	51	
10	Ayutthaya United	34	15	6	13	50	43	+7	51	
11	Chiangmai	34	13	7	14	49	41	+8	46	
12	Krabi	34	10	12	12	46	46	0	42	
13	Chainat Hornbill	34	11	8	15	44	48	−4	41	
14	Samut Prakan City	34	8	13	13	32	42	−10	37 (Note: The mini-league points record; Samut Prakan City 6 pts, Kasetsart 4 pts, Rajpracha 3 pts.)	
15	Kasetsart	34	8	13	13	35	42	−7	37	
16	Rajpracha (R)	34	9	10	15	29	41	−12	37	Relegation to 2023–24 Thai League 3
17	Ranong United (R)	34	6	9	19	28	64	−36	27	Relegation to 2023–24 Thai League 3
18	Udon Thani (R)	34	6	3	25	31	87	−56	21	Relegation to 2023–24 Thai League 3

Source: Thai League
Rules for classification: 1) Points; 2) Head-to-head points; 3) Head-to-head goals difference; 4) Head-to-head goals scored; 5) Overall goals difference; 6) Overall goals scored; 7) Fair play points; 8) Play-off without extra time).
(C) Champions; (O) Play-off winners; (P) Promoted; (R) Relegated

=== Promotion play-offs ===
Semi-finals
5	Chiangmai United	2	0	2
4	Customs United (a)	1	1	2
6	Suphanburi	3	1	4
3	Uthai Thani	2	3	5

Finals
Customs United	1	1	2
Uthai Thani	2	3	5

==== Semi-finals ====
7 May 2023
18:00 UTC+7

Chiangmai United	2–1	Customs United
Nantawat Suankaew 29', 53'	Report; Highlight	Alexandre Balotelli 78'

700th Anniversary of Chiangmai Stadium,
Mae Rim, Chiangmai
Attendance: 2,157
Referee: Satchukorn Saenchu (Thailand)
12 May 2023
19:00 UTC+7

Customs United	1–0	Chiangmai United
Natthawat Thobansong 45+1'	Report; Highlight

Customs Department Stadium, Ladkrabang 54,
Bang Phli, Samut Prakan
Attendance: 875
Referee: Ekkachai Phetcham (Thailand)

2–2 on aggregate. Customs United won on away goals.

6 May 2023
18:00 UTC+7

Suphanburi	3–2	Uthai Thani
Kittipong Wongma 13', 42'; Douglas Tardin 17' (pen.)	Report; Highlight	Ricardo Santos 39' (pen.); Phiyawat Intarapim 52' (o.g.)

Suphanburi Provincial Stadium,
Mueang, Suphanburi
Attendance: 1,635
Referee: Chaiya Moolmanee (Thailand)
12 May 2023
19:00 UTC+7

Uthai Thani	3–1	Suphanburi
Nitipong Sanmahung 8'; Narong Jansawek 74'; Ricardo Santos 90+4'	Report; Highlight	João Paulo 58'

Uthai Thani Provincial Stadium,
Mueang, Uthai Thani
Attendance: 3,023
Referee: Pawara Seejen (Thailand)

Uthai Thani won 5–4 on aggregate.

==== Finals ====
21 May 2023
18:00 UTC+7

Customs United	1–2	Uthai Thani
Aung Kaung Mann 17'	Report; Highlight	Anupan Kerdsompong 60'; Nontapat Naksawat 72'

Customs Department Stadium, Ladkrabang 54,
Bang Phli, Samut Prakan
Attendance: 1,472
Referee: Songkran Bunmeekiart (Thailand)
27 May 2023
18:00 UTC+7

Uthai Thani	3–1	Customs United
Brinner 20'; Kittisak Phutchan 44'; Hikaru Minegishi 90'	Report; Highlight	Phodchara Chainarong 78'

Uthai Thani Provincial Stadium,
Mueang, Uthai Thani
Attendance: 4,141
Referee: Mongkolchai Pechsri (Thailand)

Uthai Thani won 5–2 on aggregate.

=== Positions by round ===
Team ╲ Round	1	2	3	4	5	6	7	8	9	10	11	12	13	14	15	16	17	18	19	20	21	22	23	24	25	26	27	28	29	30	31	32	33	34
Nakhon Pathom United	6	7	7	8	8	6	3	3	5	5	7	7	7	4	5	5	3	3	3	4	4	5	5	4	3	3	4	4	3	2	4	2	2	1
Trat	12	5	6	10	5	9	11	13	12	11	11	9	11	9	11	13	11	11	11	9	11	8	10	9	7	5	3	2	1	1	1	1	1	2
Uthai Thani	1	1	9	11	6	7	8	12	13	13	13	12	14	14	12	10	10	7	7	6	7	7	7	6	8	7	6	6	5	3	5	3	3	3
Customs United	17	10	4	2	2	3	4	4	3	4	5	4	4	6	7	7	8	9	9	12	9	10	8	10	9	8	7	9	8	5	2	5	4	4
Chiangmai United	4	6	11	6	10	11	13	9	10	8	8	5	5	5	4	6	7	6	6	5	5	6	3	3	4	6	5	5	4	7	8	9	9	5
Suphanburi	3	3	2	3	9	5	7	6	4	3	3	3	3	3	3	2	2	2	2	2	2	2	2	2	1	1	1	1	2	6	3	6	6	6
Rayong	11	13	8	7	4	4	5	7	8	12	12	14	12	13	14	14	12	13	12	11	8	9	9	8	10	9	9	8	7	4	6	4	5	7
Nakhon Si United	13	9	10	5	3	2	2	1	2	2	2	2	2	1	1	1	1	1	1	1	1	1	1	1	2	2	2	3	6	8	7	7	8	8
Phrae United	7	4	3	4	7	8	12	8	9	6	4	6	6	7	6	4	5	4	4	3	3	3	4	5	6	10	10	10	10	10	10	10	10	9
Ayutthaya United	2	2	1	1	1	1	1	2	1	1	1	1	1	2	2	3	4	5	5	7	6	4	6	7	5	4	8	7	9	9	9	8	7	10
Chiangmai	9	11	5	9	13	10	6	5	6	7	10	11	9	12	9	9	9	10	10	8	10	11	11	11	11	11	11	11	13	12	12	12	11	11
Krabi	14	17	16	16	16	16	17	17	17	16	17	17	16	16	16	16	16	16	16	16	16	16	16	14	14	14	15	12	11	11	11	11	12	12
Chainat Hornbill	5	8	12	15	12	14	10	14	14	14	14	15	15	15	15	15	15	15	15	15	14	13	12	12	12	12	12	13	12	13	13	13	13	13
Samut Prakan City	15	15	17	17	17	17	14	10	7	9	9	10	8	10	10	11	13	12	13	13	15	14	14	15	13	13	14	14	14	14	15	14	14	14
Kasetsart	18	16	15	12	15	15	16	16	15	15	15	13	13	11	13	12	14	14	14	14	13	15	15	16	16	16	16	16	16	16	16	16	16	15
Rajpracha	8	14	13	14	11	12	9	11	11	10	6	8	10	8	8	8	6	8	8	10	12	12	13	13	15	15	13	15	15	15	14	15	15	16
Ranong United	10	12	14	13	14	13	15	15	16	17	16	16	17	17	17	17	17	17	17	17	17	17	17	17	17	17	17	17	17	17	17	17	17	17
Udon Thani	16	18	18	18	18	18	18	18	18	18	18	18	18	18	18	18	18	18	18	18	18	18	18	18	18	18	18	18	18	18	18	18	18	18

Source: Thai League
= Leader and promotion to 2023–24 Thai League 1; = Promotion to 2023–24 Thai League 1; = Qualification for promotion play-offs; = Relegation to 2023–24 Thai League 3

=== Results by round ===
Team ╲ Round	1	2	3	4	5	6	7	8	9	10	11	12	13	14	15	16	17	18	19	20	21	22	23	24	25	26	27	28	29	30	31	32	33	34
Nakhon Pathom United	W	D	D	D	D	W	W	W	L	L	D	L	W	W	D	W	W	W	D	L	D	D	D	W	W	D	L	W	D	W	L	W	W	W
Trat	D	W	D	L	W	L	D	D	W	D	D	D	L	W	L	L	W	W	D	W	L	W	L	W	W	W	W	W	W	W	W	L	D	W
Uthai Thani	W	D	L	D	W	L	D	L	D	L	D	W	L	D	W	W	W	W	D	W	L	W	D	D	D	W	W	W	D	W	L	W	W	W
Customs United	L	W	W	W	W	L	W	D	D	L	W	D	D	L	L	W	L	L	D	L	W	D	W	D	W	W	W	L	W	W	W	L	W	W
Chiangmai United	W	D	L	W	L	L	D	W	D	W	D	W	W	D	W	L	D	D	D	W	W	L	W	W	L	L	W	W	D	L	L	L	W	W
Suphanburi	W	D	W	L	L	W	L	W	W	W	W	W	L	W	D	W	W	W	D	L	L	L	D	W	W	L	W	L	L	L	W	L	L	L
Rayong	D	D	W	D	W	W	L	L	D	L	L	L	W	D	D	D	W	L	W	W	W	L	D	W	D	W	D	W	W	W	L	W	L	L
Nakhon Si United	L	W	D	W	W	W	D	W	L	W	W	W	L	W	W	L	W	W	D	L	W	L	D	D	L	D	D	D	L	L	D	W	L	L
Phrae United	D	W	W	L	D	L	L	W	D	W	W	L	W	L	W	W	L	W	D	W	D	D	D	L	D	L	L	D	W	D	D	W	D	W
Ayutthaya United	W	D	W	W	W	W	L	L	W	W	W	W	L	D	L	L	L	L	D	L	W	W	L	L	W	W	D	D	L	L	D	W	W	L
Chiangmai	D	D	W	L	L	W	W	W	D	L	L	L	W	L	W	W	D	L	D	W	L	D	D	W	L	L	L	L	L	W	L	W	W	W
Krabi	L	L	D	D	L	W	L	L	D	D	L	L	W	L	W	L	D	L	D	W	W	W	D	W	D	L	D	W	W	W	D	D	L	D
Chainat Hornbill	W	L	L	L	W	L	W	L	D	L	D	D	L	W	L	L	L	W	D	D	W	W	W	L	W	L	D	L	D	L	W	L	W	D
Samut Prakan City	L	D	L	D	L	W	W	W	W	D	D	L	W	L	D	D	D	L	D	L	L	W	D	L	W	D	D	D	D	L	L	W	L	L
Kasetsart	L	D	D	W	L	D	L	L	W	D	D	W	D	W	L	D	L	D	D	D	W	L	L	L	D	L	L	L	W	D	D	L	W	W
Rajpracha	D	L	D	D	W	L	W	D	D	W	W	L	L	W	D	W	W	L	D	L	L	L	D	L	L	L	W	L	D	L	W	D	L	L
Ranong United	D	D	L	W	L	D	D	L	L	L	D	D	L	L	L	D	L	W	D	L	L	W	L	L	L	W	L	W	W	L	D	L	L	L
Udon Thani	L	L	L	L	L	L	W	L	L	L	L	D	W	L	D	L	L	L	L	W	L	L	D	L	W	L	L	L	L	W	W	L	L	L

Source: Thai League
W = Won; D = Drawn; L = Lost

=== Results ===
Home \ Away	AYU	CNH	CMI	CMU	CTU	KST	KBI	NPU	NSU	PRE	RCA	RNU	RYG	SPC	SPB	TRT	UDT	UTT
Ayutthaya United	—	0–2	2–1	0–0	0–3	2–0	1–2	0–1	5–1	0–0	3–2	1–0	1–1	2–1	0–2	3–2	2–1	1–1
Chainat Hornbill	1–0	—	1–0	2–3	2–1	0–0	1–0	0–0	1–0	1–2	1–1	1–1	3–2	1–1	2–0	1–2	1–0	2–3
Chiangmai	0–1	2–1	—	1–2	0–0	4–2	2–1	0–0	3–2	0–0	4–1	3–2	0–2	1–1	2–3	2–1	6–0	1–1
Chiangmai United	1–4	1–0	2–1	—	0–1	0–0	2–0	2–0	3–2	0–3	1–0	1–0	1–1	1–2	2–1	0–1	2–1	1–1
Customs United	1–2	3–2	1–0	0–2	—	1–1	0–0	0–1	2–0	3–2	0–1	1–1	1–0	1–0	2–0	2–1	3–1	2–1
Kasetsart	3–2	4–2	2–3	0–0	1–2	—	5–0	0–1	1–1	2–1	1–1	1–1	0–0	0–0	0–1	2–1	3–0	1–3
Krabi	2–1	2–2	0–0	1–1	0–1	2–1	—	1–1	0–2	4–1	1–1	3–0	0–0	1–1	2–0	2–3	3–2	3–0
Nakhon Pathom United	1–0	2–1	1–0	1–1	1–1	0–1	1–1	—	1–1	1–1	1–1	2–0	4–1	2–0	1–0	1–0	1–0	0–3
Nakhon Si United	3–1	2–0	1–0	0–1	3–2	2–0	1–1	1–0	—	5–2	1–0	5–1	1–3	0–2	2–1	1–1	3–0	0–0
Phrae United	3–2	3–3	1–2	1–0	1–0	0–0	3–0	0–0	1–1	—	2–0	1–2	3–2	1–1	3–0	1–2	2–1	2–2
Rajpracha	0–3	0–1	1–0	1–0	0–2	0–0	3–0	1–0	0–1	2–2	—	4–1	0–1	1–1	1–0	2–2	1–0	1–4
Ranong United	1–2	1–0	1–1	0–0	1–3	2–0	2–2	0–2	2–3	0–1	1–0	—	2–0	1–1	0–1	1–1	3–1	0–5
Rayong	0–1	1–0	4–1	1–0	2–1	3–1	0–0	1–1	1–0	3–1	1–1	0–0	—	0–1	0–0	1–1	2–0	1–0
Samut Prakan City	1–1	2–2	1–3	2–0	0–3	0–0	1–2	0–1	1–0	2–1	1–0	2–0	0–4	—	0–2	3–4	1–1	1–2
Suphanburi	1–1	1–3	1–0	0–2	2–0	0–1	3–2	1–0	3–0	0–1	1–1	2–0	2–1	0–0	—	3–0	2–0	1–0
Trat	1–0	1–0	1–0	1–1	1–1	3–0	1–0	0–1	0–0	1–1	1–0	6–0	2–1	1–0	2–0	—	1–1	2–1
Udon Thani	1–4	4–3	0–3	2–1	2–1	3–1	0–7	1–2	1–1	1–3	0–1	2–1	0–1	2–1	0–1	0–8	—	2–4
Uthai Thani	3–2	3–1	1–3	1–2	0–0	1–1	3–1	0–0	2–2	0–0	3–0	6–0	1–0	1–1	4–1	2–0	8–1	—

Source: Thai League
Legend: Blue = home team win; Yellow = draw; Red = away team win.
For upcoming matches, an "a" indicates there is an article about the rivalry between the two participants.

== Season statistics ==
=== Top scorers ===
As of 30 April 2023.

Rank	Player	Club	Goals
1	(Brazil) Ricardo Santos	Uthai Thani	28
2	(Brazil) Nilson	Ayutthaya United	18
3	(Brazil) Rodrigo Maranhão	Phrae United	16
4	(Oman) Badar Al-Alawi	Krabi	15
4	(Brazil) Tãua Ferreira	Trat	15
6	(Brazil) Diego Silva	Chainat Hornbill	14
6	(Egypt) Mohamed Essam	Nakhon Pathom United (2 Goals); Trat (12 Goals)	14
8	(Brazil) Valdo	Trat	13
9	(Nigeria) Chigozie Mbah	Krabi	12
9	(Brazil) Evandro Paulista	Nakhon Si United	12
9	(Brazil) Douglas Tardin	Suphanburi	12
9	(Brazil) Mateus Totô	Kasetsart	12
9	(Brazil) Tiago Chulapa	Rayong	12
10	(Myanmar) Lwin Moe Aung	Rayong	11

=== Hat-tricks ===
Player	For	Against	Result	Date
(Thailand) Phodchara Chainarong	Customs United	Chainat Hornbill	3–2 (H)	19 August 2022
(Brazil) Nilson	Ayutthaya United	Udon Thani	4–1 (A)	10 September 2022
(France) Greg Houla	Udon Thani	Kasetsart	3–1 (H)	1 October 2022
(Brazil) Mateus Totô	Kasetsart	Krabi	5–0 (H)	5 November 2022
(Oman) Badar Al-Alawi	Krabi	Uthai Thani	3–0 (H)	28 January 2023
(Brazil) Tiago Chulapa	Rayong	Chiangmai	4–1 (H)	29 January 2023
(Nigeria) Chigozie Mbah	Krabi	Udon Thani	7–0 (A)	4 February 2023
(Brazil) Ricardo Santos	Uthai Thani	Suphanburi	4–1 (H)	5 March 2023
(Brazil) Tãua Ferreira	trat	Ranong United	6–0 (H)	11 March 2023
(Brazil) Tãua Ferreira	trat	Udon Thani	8–0 (A)	15 March 2023
(Egypt) Mohamed Essam	trat	Udon Thani	8–0 (A)	15 March 2023
(Brazil) Ricardo Santos	Uthai Thani	Rajpracha	3–0 (H)	15 March 2023
(France) Greg Houla	Chainat Hornbill	Udon Thani	3–4 (A)	29 March 2023
(Brazil) Ricardo Santos^{5}	Uthai Thani	Udon Thani	8–1 (H)	30 April 2023

=== Clean sheets ===
As of 30 April 2023.

Rank	Player	Club	Clean sheets
1	(Thailand) Wattanachai Srathongjan	Nakhon Pathom United	16
2	(Thailand) Sumethee Khokpho	Customs United	13
2	(Thailand) Noppakun Kadtoon	Rayong	13
2	(Thailand) Piyawat Intarapim	Suphanburi	13
5	(Thailand) Suppawat Srinothai	Trat	12
6	(Thailand) Pairot Eiammak	Chiangmai United	11
7	(Thailand) Pathomtat Sudprasert	Rajpracha / Chainat Hornbill	8
7	(Thailand) Chakhon Philakhlang	Nakhon Si United	8
9	(Thailand) Sophonwit Rakyart	Phrae United	7
9	(Thailand) Thatpicha Auksornsri	Samut Prakan City	7

== Attendances ==
=== Overall statistical table ===
Pos	Team	Total	High	Low	Average	Change
1	Nakhon Si United	36,404	3,125	1,397	2,141	+196.9%
2	Nakhon Pathom United	22,402	3,033	460	1,318	+251.5%
3	Chiangmai	21,819	2,617	662	1,283	+78.9%
4	Chainat Hornbill	18,373	1,479	729	1,081	+13.1%
5	Suphanburi	18,293	1,466	695	1,076	−33.9%
6	Rayong	16,764	2,115	445	986	+91.8%
7	Trat	15,856	2,895	457	932	+67.0%
8	Uthai Thani	15,595	2,908	525	917	+207.7%
9	Chiangmai United	15,031	2,916	427	884	−41.8%
10	Ayutthaya United	14,364	1,700	428	845	+155.3%
11	Udon Thani	11,581	1,855	165	681	−20.7%
12	Phrae United	10,396	1,020	412	612	+6.1%
13	Kasetsart	8,441	1,482	288	497	−6.8%
14	Krabi	7,834	750	200	461	+10.0%
15	Customs United	7,191	825	119	423	+70.6%
16	Ranong United	6,342	812	274	373	−15.0%
17	Samut Prakan City	5,422	556	129	319	−61.8%
18	Rajpracha	4,576	674	102	269	n/a^{†}
	League total	256,465	3,125	102	838	+32.2%

Updated to games played on 30 April 2023
Source: Thai League
Notes:
^{†} Rajpracha didn`t allow fans in previous season

=== Attendances by home match played ===
Team \ Match played	1	2	3	4	5	6	7	8	9	10	11	12	13	14	15	16	17	Total
Ayutthaya United	887	1,506	1,700	1,063	1,287	949	1,033	651	661	674	447	669	428	582	475	435	917	14,364
Chainat Hornbill	1,119	1,059	1,281	1,095	729	730	835	1,320	1,050	1,032	1,325	1,153	1,479	1,250	1,031	833	1,052	18,373
Chiangmai	1,831	1,639	1,128	1,713	1,355	1,166	836	1,163	1,505	1,205	1,343	870	963	2,617	662	776	1,047	21,819
Chiangmai United	1,391	1,381	765	715	2,916	566	849	766	714	657	736	599	628	689	754	427	478	15,031
Customs United	380	520	300	685	320	500	406	200	200	320	675	331	119	220	480	490	825	7,191
Kasetsart	425	442	288	342	378	432	445	392	620	342	315	445	622	342	307	822	1,482	8,441
Krabi	450	309	350	200	750	450	400	400	475	400	550	400	500	550	650	600	400	7,834
Nakhon Pathom United	460	1,200	1,000	1,200	1,200	1,175	974	875	825	1,066	728	1,025	2,010	2,252	825	2,555	3,033	22,402
Nakhon Si United	1,500	2,088	2,108	2,071	2,870	2,707	2,135	1,518	2,878	3,125	1,397	2,559	1,950	2,214	2,223	1,650	1,411	36,404
Phrae United	795	729	1,020	474	448	412	455	614	876	465	703	616	655	475	461	571	627	10,396
Rajpracha	423	102	149	319	212	142	356	142	214	674	168	307	271	279	230	308	280	4,576
Ranong United	542	407	812	450	428	312	346	274	316	317	312	307	305	302	310	324	278	6,342
Rayong	946	820	661	1,100	900	1,145	575	445	739	715	1,129	1,016	1,009	904	835	2,115	1,710	16,764
Samut Prakan City	556	477	232	140	143	424	313	129	223	546	352	404	248	260	295	294	386	5,422
Suphanburi	1,077	1,466	1,153	1,214	695	954	1,019	830	1,368	1,046	1,030	977	1,026	1,126	1,256	1,064	992	18,293
Trat	795	685	791	698	498	694	768	457	780	765	769	799	755	995	1,117	1,595	2,895	15,856
Udon Thani	1,855	1,540	854	1,025	455	375	240	750	192	530	760	954	198	437	211	165	1,040	11,581
Uthai Thani	1,130	1,011	982	875	745	525	659	665	601	680	590	596	916	662	912	1,138	2,908	15,595

== See also ==
- 2022–23 Thai League 1
- 2022–23 Thai League 3
- 2023 Thailand Amateur League
- 2022–23 Thai FA Cup
- 2022–23 Thai League Cup
- 2022 Thailand Champions Cup
