= Chokchai Chuchai =

Thai footballer (born 1988)

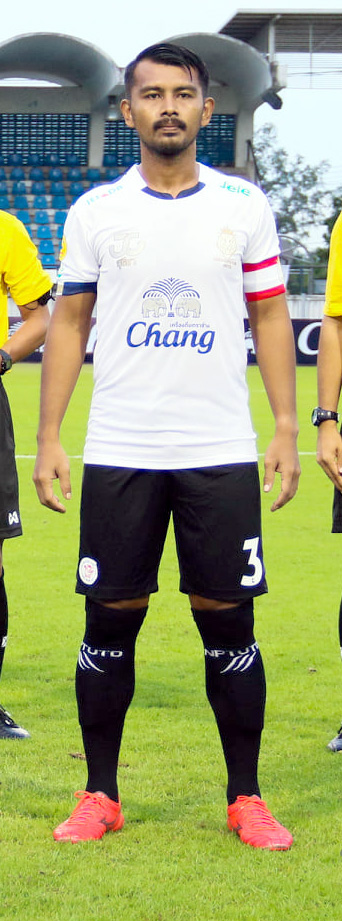
- Chokchai Chuchai playing for Nakhon Pathom United.

Personal information
- Full name: Chokchai Chuchai
- Date of birth: 19 April 1988 (age 38)
- Place of birth: Phattalung, Thailand
- Height: 1.73 m (5 ft 8 in)
- Position: Defender

Senior career*
Years	Team	Apps	(Gls)
2007–2008	PEA	6	(0)
2009	Muangthong United	2	(0)
2010	Rajpracha	15	(0)
2011–2012	Suphanburi	4	(0)
2012	→ Esan United (loan)	3	(0)
2013	Trat	10	(0)
2014–2015	Songkhla United	32	(1)
2016–2025	Nakhon Pathom United	158	(6)

International career
2002–2004	Thailand U17	8	(2)
- * Club domestic league appearances and goals as of 30 April 2025

Chokchai Chuchai (Thai: โชคชัย ชูชัย; born April 19, 1988) is a Thai professional footballer.

== Honours ==
=== Club ===
Buriram PEA

- Thailand Premier League Champions (1) : 2008

Muangthong United

- Thai Premier League Champions (1) : 2009

Nakhon Pathom United

- Thai League 2: 2022–23
