= Evandro Paulista =

Brazilian footballer (born 1987)

Personal information
- Full name: Evandro Silva do Nascimento
- Date of birth: 26 September 1987 (age 39)
- Place of birth: Guarulhos, São Paulo, Brazil
- Height: 1.86 m (6 ft 1 in)
- Position: Forward

Senior career*
Years	Team	Apps	(Gls)
2007	Bonsucesso		
2007–2008	Os Belenenses	7	(4)
2009–2010	União São João		
2010	Gama	2	(0)
2011	São Carlos	19	(12)
2011	Corinthians B		
2015	Oita Trinita	22	(8)
2016	F.C. Gifu	23	(7)
2017	Daegu FC	29	(15)
2018	FC Seoul	30	(8)
2019	Sichuan Longfor	4	(1)
2020	Sukhothai	7	(3)
2020–2021	Chiangmai United	15	(4)
2021–2022	Police Tero	22	(6)
2022–2023	Nakhon Si United	30	(12)
2023	Trat	13	(4)
2024	Nakhon Pathom United	7	(0)
- * Club domestic league appearances and goals as of 26 May 2024

Evandro Silva do Nascimento, known as Evandro Paulista (born 26 September 1987), is a Brazilian footballer who play as a forward.

== Club career ==
=== FC Seoul ===
On 4 January 2018, Evandro joined the K League 1 side FC Seoul.

On 19 February 2019, Officially Evandro's contract with FC Seoul was terminated by mutual consent.

== Career statistics ==
As of 24 December 2023

Appearances and goals by club, season and competition
Club	Season	League			State League		Cup		League Cup		Continental		Other		Total	
Club	Season	Division	Apps	Goals	Apps	Goals	Apps	Goals	Apps	Goals	Apps	Goals	Apps	Goals	Apps	Goals
Belenenses	2007–08	Primeira Liga	5	1	—		0	0	1	0	1	0	—		7	1
Belenenses	2008–09	Primeira Liga	1	0	—		0	0	1	0	—		—		2	0
Belenenses	Total		6	1	—		0	0	2	0	1	0	—		9	1
União São João	2010	—			5	1	—		—		—		—		5	1
Gama	2010	Série C	2	0	—		—		—		—		—		2	0
São Carlos	2011	—			19	9	—		—		—		—		19	9
Tupi	2012	—			3	0	—		—		—		—		3	0
Al-Jahra	2012–13	Kuwaiti Premier League		5	—				—		—		—			5
Aparecidense	2014	—			11	4	—		—		—		—		11	4
Vila Nova	2014	Série B	6	0	—		—		—		—		—		6	0
Anapolina	2014	Série D	5	0	—		—		—		—		—		5	0
Oita Trinita	2015	J2 League	22	3	—		2	0	—		—		1	0	25	3
FC Gifu	2016	J2 League	23	5	—		0	0	—		—		—		23	5
Daegu FC	2017	K League 1	29	11	—		1	1	—		—		—		30	12
FC Seoul	2018	K League 1	30	3	—		2	0	—		—		2	0	34	3
Sichuan Longfor	2019	China League One	4	1	—		0	0	—		—		0	0	4	1
Sukhothai	2020–21	Thai League 1	7	3	—		0	0	—		—		—		7	3
Chiangmai United	2020–21	Thai League 2	15	4	—		—		—		—		—		15	4
Police Tero	2021–22	Thai League 1	22	6	—		3	2	2	0	—		—		27	8
Nakhon Si United	2022–23	Thai League 2	30	12	—		0	0	—		—		—		30	12
Trat	2023–24	Thai League 1	13	4	—		0	0	0	0	—		—		13	4
Career total			214	58	38	14	8	3	4	0	1	0	3	0	268	75
