= 2019 Thai League 3 Lower Region =

Thai League 3
- Season: 2019
- Dates: 9 February 2019 – 7 September 2019
- Champions: Nakhon Pathom United
- Relegated: Royal Thai Army; Surat Thani
- Final: Nakhon Pathom United
- Third place play-off: Ranong United
- Matches: 182
- Goals: 473 (2.6 per match)
- Top goalscorer: Diego Oliveira Silva (13 goals; Nakhon Pathom United); Tomohiro Onodera (13 goals; Ranong United)
- Biggest home win: 6 goals difference Nakhon Pathom United 6–0 Surat Thani (7 September 2019)
- Biggest away win: 5 goals difference Surat Thani 0–5 Royal Thai Army (2 March 2019); Surat Thani 0–5 Nakhon Si United (19 May 2019); Surat Thani 0–5 Ranong United (31 August 2019)
- Highest scoring: 9 goals Nakhon Pathom United 7–2 Royal Thai Army (21 August 2019)
- Longest winning run: 7 matches Nakhon Pathom United
- Longest unbeaten run: 20 matches Nakhon Pathom United
- Longest winless run: 21 matches Surat Thani
- Longest losing run: 8 matches Surat Thani
- Highest attendance: 1,892; Nakhon Pathom United 6–0 Surat Thani (8 September 2019)
- Lowest attendance: 79; Surat Thani 0–2 Kasem Bundit University (3 August 2019)
- Total attendance: 73,327
- Average attendance: 405

2019 Thai League 3 Lower Region is the 3rd season of the Thai football league. It is a part of the Thai League 3 and the feeder league for the Thai League 2. A total of 14 teams will compete in the league this season.

== Changes from last season ==
=== Team changes ===
==== Promoted clubs ====
Two clubs were promoted from the 2018 Thai League 4

- Nakhon Pathom United
- North Bangkok University

A clubs were promoted to the 2019 Thai League 2

- MOF Customs United

==== Relegated clubs ====
A club was relegated to the 2019 Thai League 4 Bangkok Metropolitan Region

- Deffo

A club was relegated from the 2018 Thai League 2

- Krabi

=== Moved clubs ===
- Simork were moved into the Upper Region.

=== Renamed clubs ===
- WU Nakhon Si United renamed Nakhon Si United

== Teams ==
=== Stadium and locations ===
Locations of the Thai League 3 Upper region in 2019
2019 Thai League 3 Lower Region
Football clubs in Bangkok Metropolitan Region

Team	Location	Stadium	Capacity
BTU United	Bangkok	Bangkok-Thonburi University Stadium	1,500
Chamchuri United	Bangkok	Chulalongkorn University Stadium	20,000
Kasem Bundit University	Bangkok	Kasem Bundit University Stadium, Rom Klao	2,000
Krabi	Krabi	Krabi Provincial Stadium	8,000
Nakhon Pathom United	Nakhon Pathom	Nakhon Pathom Municipality Sport School Stadium	6,000
Nakhon Si United	Nakhon Si Thammarat	Nakhon Si Thammarat PAO. Stadium	10,000
Nara United	Narathiwat	Narathiwat PAO. Stadium	5,000
North Bangkok University	Pathum Thani	North Bangkok University Stadium (Rangsit)	3,000
Phuket City	Phuket	Surakul Stadium	15,000
Rajpracha	Bangkok	Thonburi Stadium	5,000
Ranong United	Ranong	Ranong Provincial Stadium	7,000
Royal Thai Army	Bangkok	Thai Army Sports Stadium	20,000
Surat Thani	Surat Thani	Surat Thani Provincial Stadium	10,000
Trang	Trang	Trang Municipality Stadium	5,000

=== Foreign Players ===
Club	Player 1	Player 2	Player 3	Player 4	Player 5	Former
BTU United	(Madagascar) Guy Hubert	(Madagascar) Thierry Ratsimbazafy	(South Korea) Cho Dong-gyu			
Chamchuri United	(Brazil) Michel Ferreira	(Cameroon) Isaac Mbengan	(Guinea) Barry Lélouma	(Japan) Kunie Kitamoto		
Kasem Bundit University	(India) Pragath Subbaiya	(South Korea) Hwang Soo-young	(South Korea) Park Seon-hong	(Sweden) Selwan Al Jaberi		(Brazil) Fabricio Marabá (Japan) Shuya Akamatsu
Krabi	(Argentina) Nicolás Abot	(Ivory Coast) Seydou Koné	(Japan) Ryohei Maeda	(Laos) Sengvilay Chanthasili	(Lebanon) Ibrahim Bahsoun	(Brazil) Raphael Manhães (Trinidad and Tobago) Seon Power
Nakhon Pathom United	(Brazil) Diego Oliveira Silva	(Brazil) Tauã dos Santos	(Ghana) Lesley Ablorh	(Iran) Saeid Chahjouei	(Laos) Phoutthasay Khochalern	(Brazil) Jhonatan Bernardo (Germany) Danny Radke
Nakhon Si United	(Brazil) Albert Frank	(Ghana) Samuel Abega	(Nigeria) Jimmy Shola	(South Korea) Kong Tae-Hyeon	(South Korea) Yoo Chang-gyun	(South Korea) Park Seon-hong
Nara United	(Brazil) Jhonatan Bernardo	(Trinidad and Tobago) Seon Power				(Ivory Coast) Kobenan N'Guatta (Guinea) Barry Lélouma (Guinea) Aly Badara Diop (South Korea) Kim Sang-su
North Bangkok University	(Brazil) Julio Cesar	(Brazil) Léo Ribeiro	(South Korea) Kim Se-hun	(Timor-Leste) João Pedro		(Brazil) Gian Luca Silva (Japan) Toshiki Okamoto
Phuket City	(Cameroon) Berlin Ndebe-Nlome	(Cameroon) Lionel Frank	(Laos) Phathana Phommathep	(Nigeria) Efe Obode	(South Korea) Lee Jae-sung	(South Korea) Hwang In-seong
Rajpracha	(Republic of the Congo) Willy Wabanga	(Egypt) Ahmed Shamsaldin	(Japan) Yushi Kawaguchi	(Nigeria) Onyemelukwe Okechukwu		(Madagascar) Dimitri Carlos Zozimar (South Africa) Matthew Roda
Ranong United	(Cameroon) Armand Njikam	(Cameroon) Kaham Mardochee	(Republic of the Congo) Burnel Okana-Stazi	(Japan) Tomohiro Onodera	(Myanmar) Win Hlaing Oo	
Royal Thai Army						
Surat Thani	(Brazil) Lucas Massaro	(Ivory Coast) Mikael Fabrice	(Iran) Aghapabazadeh Hamdollah	(Mali) Aremu Kassim		(Ivory Coast) Kourouma Mohamed (Ivory Coast) Soumahoro Mafa
Trang	(Brazil) Douglas Lopes Carneiro	(Brazil) Ranieri Luiz Barbosa	(Brazil) Sarôa	(Japan) Tetsuro Inoue		(Cameroon) Elvis Job (South Korea) Park Jae-hyeong

== League table ==
Pos	Team	Pld	W	D	L	GF	GA	GD	Pts	Qualification or relegation
1	Nakhon Pathom United (Q, P)	26	18	7	1	57	18	+39	61	Qualification to final and promotion to 2020 Thai League 2
2	Ranong United (Q, P)	26	14	8	4	45	20	+25	50	Qualification to third place play-offs
3	Nara United	26	11	11	4	42	26	+16	44	
4	Trang	26	11	8	7	31	27	+4	41	
5	North Bangkok University	26	10	10	6	29	20	+9	40	
6	Phuket City	26	10	7	9	33	36	−3	37	
7	Krabi	26	10	6	10	34	29	+5	36	
8	Kasem Bundit University	26	9	8	9	36	36	0	35	
9	BTU United	26	8	9	9	36	30	+6	33	
10	Nakhon Si United	26	8	8	10	29	38	−9	32	
11	Chamchuri United	26	7	8	11	33	42	−9	29	
12	Rajpracha	26	7	6	13	19	33	−14	27	
13	Royal Thai Army (R)	26	4	7	15	29	45	−16	19	Relegation to the 2020 Thai League 4
14	Surat Thani (R)	26	1	5	20	20	72	−52	8	Relegation to the 2020 Thai League 4

Updated to match(es) played on 8 September 2019. Source: Thai League 3
Rules for classification: 1) Points; 2) Head-to-head; 3) Goal difference; 4) Goals scored;).
(P) Promoted; (Q) Qualified for the phase indicated; (R) Relegated

=== Positions by round ===
The table lists the positions of teams after each week of matches. In order to preserve chronological evolvements, any postponed matches are not included in the round at which they were originally scheduled, but added to the full round they were played immediately afterwards. For example, if a match is scheduled for matchday 11, but then postponed and played between days 12 and 13, it will be added to the standings for day 14.

Team ╲ Round	1	2	3	4	5	6	7	8	9	10	11	12	13	14	15	16	17	18	19	20	21	22	23	24	25	26
Nakhon Pathom United	4	4	1	1	1	1	1	1	1	1	1	1	1	1	1	1	1	1	1	1	1	1	1	1	1	1
Ranong United	8	5	6	7	2	4	8	5	3	4	4	3	2	2	2	2	2	2	3	3	3	3	2	2	2	2
Nara United	12	8	9	4	5	6	5	7	4	5	5	6	4	5	3	4	3	3	2	2	2	2	3	3	3	3
Trang	6	7	8	3	4	2	2	3	7	7	7	8	7	6	7	5	5	5	5	5	5	5	5	4	5	4
North Bangkok University	7	10	12	10	8	3	3	2	2	2	3	2	3	3	4	3	4	4	4	4	4	4	4	5	4	5
Phuket City	14	12	13	11	11	11	11	12	10	10	10	11	11	11	10	9	9	8	9	9	7	7	8	7	7	6
Krabi	1	2	3	2	3	5	4	6	8	9	9	9	10	9	9	8	8	6	8	6	6	6	6	6	6	7
Kasem Bundit University	3	3	5	8	9	8	6	4	6	6	6	7	6	8	8	10	10	10	10	7	8	9	10	10	8	8
BTU United	13	6	7	9	10	10	10	9	9	8	8	5	8	7	6	6	7	9	7	10	10	8	9	9	10	9
Nakhon Si United	2	1	2	5	6	9	7	8	5	3	2	4	5	4	5	7	6	7	6	8	9	10	7	8	9	10
Chamchuri United	9	11	11	13	14	14	14	13	13	13	13	13	13	13	13	13	13	13	13	11	11	12	11	11	11	11
Rajpracha	10	13	10	12	12	12	12	11	12	12	12	10	12	12	12	12	12	12	11	13	12	11	12	12	12	12
Royal Thai Army	5	9	4	6	7	7	9	10	11	11	11	12	9	10	11	11	11	11	12	12	13	13	13	13	13	13
Surat Thani	11	14	14	14	13	13	13	14	14	14	14	14	14	14	14	14	14	14	14	14	14	14	14	14	14	14

Leader and promotion to the 2020 Thai League 2
Qualification for Thai League 3 Play-offs
Relegation to the 2020 Thai League 4

Source: Thai League 3

=== Results by match played ===
Team ╲ Round	1	2	3	4	5	6	7	8	9	10	11	12	13	14	15	16	17	18	19	20	21	22	23	24	25	26
BTU United	L	W	D	D	D	L	L	W	W	D	D	W	L	W	W	D	L	L	D	L	L	W	D	L	D	W
Chamchuri United	L	L	D	L	D	D	L	D	L	D	L	L	L	D	W	L	D	W	W	W	W	L	W	W	L	D
Kasem Bundit University	W	W	L	L	D	D	W	W	L	D	D	L	W	L	D	L	D	L	W	W	D	L	D	L	W	W
Krabi	W	W	D	L	D	D	W	L	L	L	L	W	L	W	L	W	D	W	L	W	W	D	L	W	D	L
Nakhon Pathom United	W	W	W	W	D	W	D	W	W	W	W	W	W	W	D	W	D	W	W	D	L	W	W	D	D	W
Nakhon Si United	W	W	D	L	D	L	W	D	W	W	W	L	L	W	L	L	D	L	D	L	D	D	W	L	D	L
Nara United	L	W	D	W	D	D	W	L	W	D	L	W	W	D	W	D	W	W	W	D	D	W	D	D	D	L
North Bangkok University	D	L	L	W	W	W	W	W	W	D	D	W	L	L	D	W	D	W	D	D	D	L	D	L	W	D
Phuket City	L	L	D	W	D	D	L	L	W	W	L	W	L	L	W	W	D	W	L	D	W	D	D	W	L	W
Rajpracha	L	L	W	L	L	D	L	W	L	L	W	W	L	L	D	D	D	L	D	L	W	W	L	W	D	L
Ranong United	D	W	D	D	W	L	D	W	W	D	W	W	W	W	L	D	W	W	L	D	L	W	W	W	W	D
Royal Thai Army	W	L	W	L	D	D	L	L	L	W	L	D	W	L	D	L	L	L	L	D	L	L	L	L	D	D
Surat Thani	L	L	L	L	W	D	L	L	L	L	L	L	L	L	D	L	D	L	L	L	D	D	L	L	L	L
Trang	W	L	D	W	D	W	W	L	L	L	D	D	W	W	L	W	D	L	W	W	D	L	D	W	D	L

Source: Thai League 3
W = Win; D = Draw; L = Lose

== Results ==
Home \ Away	BTU	CCU	KBU	KBI	NPU	NSU	NRU	NBU	PKC	RAJ	RNU	RTA	SRT	TRG
BTU United	—	2–1	3–3	3–2	0–1	5–0	1–1	0–2	2–3	3–0	1–1	1–2	3–0	0–2
Chamchuri United	1–1	—	1–2	2–0	0–0	1–1	0–0	2–0	0–2	3–1	1–0	1–2	3–3	3–3
Kasem Bundit University	2–2	3–0	—	1–1	0–1	1–1	3–1	0–2	0–0	1–2	0–0	2–1	2–1	2–3
Krabi	4–1	2–1	2–1	—	0–1	0–2	1–1	0–1	1–0	2–1	1–2	0–0	4–3	0–0
Nakhon Pathom United	1–0	3–3	1–1	0–2	—	5–0	2–0	2–1	5–0	2–0	2–1	7–2	6–0	2–0
Nakhon Si United	0–0	0–2	2–0	0–0	0–2	—	1–1	0–2	4–1	2–0	0–2	1–0	3–1	1–1
Nara United	2–1	2–1	1–2	3–1	2–2	2–0	—	2–0	4–2	2–0	1–2	1–1	4–1	5–1
North Bangkok University	0–0	4–0	3–1	0–0	2–3	2–1	0–0	—	1–0	0–0	1–1	1–0	1–1	1–1
Phuket City	0–2	2–1	2–2	1–2	0–0	4–1	1–1	3–2	—	1–0	1–0	1–0	5–1	0–2
Rajpracha	1–0	3–0	2–0	1–0	1–1	0–0	0–0	1–0	1–1	—	0–3	0–2	2–2	1–2
Ranong United	1–1	2–0	3–2	2–1	1–1	5–1	1–1	1–1	1–1	3–0	—	2–1	3–0	1–0
Royal Thai Army	0–0	1–1	1–2	1–5	1–4	0–2	2–3	1–1	1–2	1–2	0–1	—	1–1	2–2
Surat Thani	0–2	3–4	0–2	0–3	1–2	0–5	0–2	0–1	0–0	1–0	0–5	0–5	—	0–2
Trang	1–2	0–1	0–1	1–0	0–1	1–1	0–0	0–0	2–0	1–0	2–1	2–1	2–1	—

Updated to match(es) played on 8 September 2019. Source: Thai League 3
Legend: Blue = home team win; Yellow = draw; Red = away team win.

== Season statistics ==
=== Top scorers ===
As of 8 September 2019.

Rank	Player	Club	Goals
1	(Brazil) Diego Oliveira Silva	Nakhon Pathom United	13
1	(Japan) Tomohiro Onodera	Ranong United	13
3	(Thailand) Natthawut Namthip	BTU United	11
4	(Brazil) Jhonatan Bernardo	Nakhon Pathom United (1 Goal); Nara United (9 Goals)	10
4	(Thailand) Pithak Abdulraman	Nara United	10
6	(Sweden) Selwan Al Jaberi	Bangkok (5 Goals); Kasem Bundit University (4 Goals)	9
6	(Republic of the Congo) Burnel Okana-Stazi	Ranong United	9
8	(Cameroon) Issac Mbengan	Chamchuri United	8
8	(Argentina) Nicolás Abot	Krabi	8
8	(Nigeria) Efe Obode	Phuket City	8
8	(Thailand) Anusak Laosangthai	Trang	8

=== Hat-tricks ===
Player	For	Against	Result	Date
(South Korea) Park Seon-hong	Nakhon Si United	Phuket City	4–1	9 February 2019
(Thailand) Natthawut Namthip	BTU United	Surat Thani	3–0	17 February 2019
(Thailand) Pithak Abdulraman	Nara United	Phuket City	4–2	23 June 2019
(Brazil) Diego Oliveira Silva	Nakhon Pathom United	North Bangkok University	3–2	29 June 2019
(Thailand) Natthawut Namthip	BTU United	Nakhon Si United	5–0	7 July 2019
(Brazil) Jhonatan Bernardo	Nara United	Surat Thani	4–1	31 July 2019
(Brazil) Ferreira Dos Santos	Nakhon Pathom United	Royal Thai Army	7–2	21 August 2019
(Japan) Tomohiro Onodera	Ranong United	Nakhon Si United	5–1	25 August 2019

== Attendance ==
=== Overall statistics ===
Pos	Team	Total	High	Low	Average	Change
1	Nakhon Pathom United	15,437	1,892	915	1,187	+41.8%
2	Nara United	10,350	1,500	400	796	+1.7%
3	Trang	8,459	1,389	294	651	−16.2%
4	Phuket City	6,221	1,400	122	479	+67.5%
5	Ranong United	5,315	650	300	443	+7.3%
6	BTU United	4,886	569	284	376	+7.7%
7	North Bangkok University	4,318	1,108	110	332	+41.3%
8	Kasem Bundit University	3,189	500	100	245	+42.4%
9	Royal Thai Army	2,895	300	165	223	−14.2%
10	Chamchuri United	2,770	300	150	213	+26.0%
11	Krabi	2,751	370	150	212	−59.6%
12	Nakhon Si United	2,525	400	90	194	−16.0%
13	Surat Thani	2,261	531	79	174	−9.8%
14	Rajpracha	1,950	215	94	150	+28.2%
	League total	73,327	1,892	79	405	+25.4%

Updated to games played on 8 September 2019
Source: Thai League 3

=== Attendance by home match played ===
Team \ Match played	1	2	3	4	5	6	7	8	9	10	11	12	13	Total
BTU United	376	382	378	335	386	352	394	396	569	284	292	384	358	4,886
Chamchuri United	250	250	300	150	300	150	150	200	170	150	300	200	200	2,770
Kasem Bundit University	500	239	250	100	250	350	200	100	180	320	300	200	200	3,189
Krabi	286	370	270	165	250	300	150	180	180	150	170	150	130	2,751
Nakhon Pathom United	1,142	1,146	1,144	1,100	1,129	1,033	915	915	1,174	1,227	1,340	1,280	1,892	15,437
Nakhon Si United	300	400	210	300	100	250	90	200	100	100	100	175	200	2,525
Nara United	400	500	500	1,500	500	500	1,400	1,000	800	600	600	1,300	750	10,350
North Bangkok University	350	200	200	200	120	120	1,070	300	270	150	120	1,108	110	4,318
Phuket City	1,300	1,400	820	300	250	300	300	149	300	320	122	500	160	6,221
Rajpracha	214	150	150	147	109	147	135	94	151	120	164	154	215	1,950
Ranong United	400	300	300	435	300	420	500	Unk.1	650	650	300	560	500	5,315
Royal Thai Army	280	225	300	215	240	240	165	170	175	185	240	210	250	2,895
Surat Thani	531	107	180	127	157	119	148	189	193	79	201	80	150	2,261
Trang	875	686	380	1,000	303	294	400	860	427	945	1,389	500	400	8,459

Source: Thai League 3
Note:
Unk.1 Some error of T3 official match report 14 July 2019 (Ranong United 1–1 BTU United).

== See also ==
- 2019 Thai League 1
- 2019 Thai League 2
- 2019 Thai League 3
- 2019 Thai League 4
- 2019 Thai FA Cup
- 2019 Thai League Cup
- 2019 Thai League 3 Upper Region
