= Thongchai Sukkoki =

Thai footballer and coach

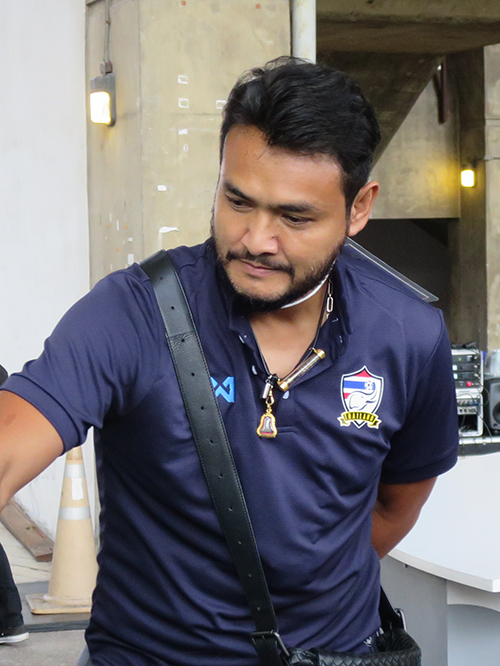

Personal information
- Full name: Thongchai Sukkoki
- Date of birth: 17 August 1973 (age 53)
- Place of birth: Ayuthaya, Thailand
- Height: 1.85 m (6 ft 1 in)
- Position: Goalkeeper

Team information
- Current team: Nakhon Pathom United (head coach)

Youth career
- Debsirin

Senior career*
| Years | Team | Apps | (Gls) |
| 1993 | Debsirin | | |
| 1994–1998 | Krung Thai Bank | | |
| 1999–2002 | Rajpracha | | |

International career
| 1994–2000 | Thailand | | |

Managerial career
- 2008–2009: Chula United
- 2009–2011: Debsirin School
- 2011–2012: Port
- 2012–2013: Ayutthaya
- 2013–2014: Prachuap
- 2014–2015: Khon Kaen United
- 2016–2017: Customs United
- 2017: Lamphun Warriors
- 2017–2023: Nakhon Pathom United
- 2023: BG Pathum United
- 2024: Nakhon Si United
- 2024–: Nakhon Pathom United
- * Club domestic league appearances and goals

Thongchai Sukkoki (Thai: ธงชัย สุขโกกี, born 17 August 1973) is a Thai professional football manager, former player and Football Critics YouTuber who is the head coach of Thai League 2 club Nakhon Pathom United.

== Managerial career ==
=== Nakhon Pathom United ===
In 2017, After the club relegation to Thai League 4, Sukkoki was hired as the club's coach. The club started again in the Tier 4 league by creating a new team and searching for young players from the initial selection of footballers, with only three players left from the previous season. Nakhon Pathom went on to won the 2018 Thai League 4 Western Region. In 2019, he won his second title after winning the 2019 Thai League 3 Lower Region and was promoted to Thai League 2. Under Sukkoki's management, the King Tiger play a style of football based on maintaining possession by building from the back, and good as combination play.

In 2023, Sukkoki led Nakhon Pathom United won 2022–23 title and the club was promoted to Thai League 1.

=== BG Pathum United ===
On 8 May 2023, BG Pathum United appointed Sukkoki as the Rabbits' new head coach in the final league game and The Revo Cup 2022-23 final as well as the start of the Thai League 1 next season. Sukkoki’s debut match ended with a home win over Chonburi, followed by a defeat to Buriram United in the 2022–23 Thai League Cup final.

BG Pathum United started off the 2023–24 Thai League 1 season well, drawing 2–2 to Police Tero on matchday 1 on 11 August 2023, and went on to draw 0–0 at home against PT Prachuap on 18 August 2023. The club then flies off to Shanghai to face Shanghai Port on 22 August 2023 in the 2023–24 AFC Champions League qualifying play-offs when in the 12-minute, Uzbekistan striker, Igor Sergeyev opened up the account to lead the match 1–0 before scoring his second goal in the 26th minute and eventually scoring a hat-trick in the 61st minute to send BG Pathum United through to the 2023–24 AFC Champions League group stage in a 2–3 away win at the Pudong Football Stadium.

=== Nakhon Si United ===
On 2 June 2024, Sukkoki was appointed as the new head coach of Thai League 2 club Nakhon Si United, signing a two-year deal.

== Managerial statistics ==
As of match played 21 November 2026

Managerial record by team and tenure
| Team | From | To | Record | | | | | Ref. |
| Team | From | To | P | W | D | L | Win % | Ref. |
|---|---|---|---|---|---|---|---|---|
| Nakhon Pathom United | 17 December 2017 | 8 May 2023 | 119 | 52 | 34 | 33 | 43.7 | |
| BG Pathum United | 8 May 2023 | 24 December 2023 | 26 | 12 | 5 | 9 | 46.2 | |
| Nakhon Si United | 2 June 2024 | 21 October 2024 | 10 | 3 | 2 | 5 | 30.0 | |
| Nakhon Pathom United | 16 November 2024 | Present | 73 | 23 | 21 | 29 | 31.5 | |
| Total | | | 228 | 90 | 62 | 76 | 39.5 | |

== Honours ==
=== Manager ===
Nakhon Pathom United

- Thai League 2: 2022–23
- Thai League 3 Lower Region: 2019
- Thai League 4: 2018
- Thai League 4 Western Region: 2018

BG Pathum United

- Thai League Cup runner-up: 2022–23

Individual

- Thai League 2 Coach of the Year: 2022–23
