= Pornpreecha Jarunai =

Thai footballer (born 1985)

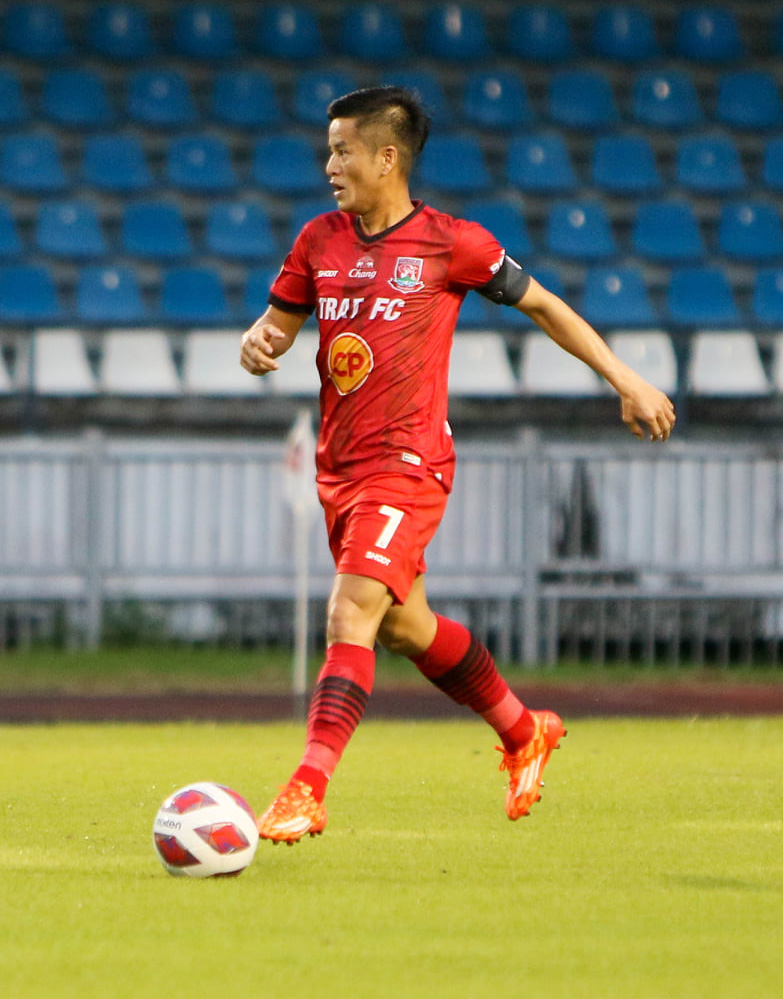

Personal information
- Full name: Pornpreecha Jarunai
- Date of birth: 27 December 1985 (age 40)
- Place of birth: Sisaket, Thailand
- Height: 1.63 m (5 ft 4 in)
- Position: Attacking midfielder

Senior career*
Years	Team	Apps	(Gls)
2011–2013	Samut Prakan United	49	(3)
2013–2014	Navy	19	(1)
2014–2015	BBCU	16	(2)
2016–2017	Sukhothai	19	(1)
2017–2018	Trat	20	(0)
2018–2020	PTT Rayong	25	(2)
2020–2026	Trat	149	(10)
- * Club domestic league appearances and goals as of 00:56, 22 June 2026 (UTC)

Pornpreecha Jarunai (Thai: พรปรีชา จารุนัย, born 27 December 1985) is a Thai professional footballer who plays as an attacking midfielder.

== Honours ==
=== Club ===
PTT Rayong

- Thai League 2: 2018
