= 2018 Thai League 2 =

Thai League 2
- Season: 2018
- Champions: PTT Rayong
- Promoted: PTT Rayong; Trat; Chiangmai
- Relegated: Krabi; Angthong
- Matches played: 210
- Goals scored: 563 (2.68 per match)
- Top goalscorer: (Brazil) Barros Tardeli (21 goals)
- Biggest home win: 5 goals difference Kasetsart 5–0 Krabi (10 March 2018); Trat 5–0 PTT Rayong (18 March 2018); Khonkaen 6–1 Trat (5 May 2018); PTT Rayong 6–1 Kasetsart (11 August 2018)
- Biggest away win: 5 goals difference Army United 1–6 Rayong (10 June 2018)
- Highest scoring: 11 goals Angthong 5–6 Chiangmai (12 September 2018)
- Longest winning run: 5 matches Khonkaen
- Longest unbeaten run: 10 matches Nongbua Pitchaya
- Longest winless run: 11 matches Samut Sakhon
- Longest losing run: 8 matches Krabi
- Highest attendance: 9,346; Udon Thani 1–1 Nongbua Pitchaya (17 March 2018)
- Lowest attendance: 289; Kasetsart 2–1 Army United (15 September 2018)
- Total attendance: 325,428
- Average attendance: 1,549
- All statistics correct as of 29 September 2018.

The 2018 Thai League 2 is the 21st season of the Thai League 2, the second-tier professional league for Thailand's association football clubs, since its establishment in 1997, also known as M-150 Championship due to the sponsorship deal with M-150. A total of 15 teams will compete in the league. The season began on 9 February 2018 and is scheduled to conclude on 29 September 2018.

Chainat Hornbill are the defending champions, while Samut Sakhon, Khonkaen and Udon Thani have entered as the promoted teams from the 2017 Thai League 3.

== Changes from last season ==
=== Team changes ===
==== From Thai League 2 ====
Promoted to 2018 Thai League
- Chainat Hornbill
- Air Force Central
- PT Prachuap

Relegated to 2018 Thai League 3
- Bangkok

Relegated to 2018 Thai League 4
- Nakhon Pathom United
- Samut Songkhram

==== To Thai League 2 ====
Relegated from 2017 Thai League
- Thai Honda
- Sisaket
- Super Power Samut Prakan

Promoted from 2017 Thai League 3
- Samut Sakhon
- Khonkaen
- Udon Thani

==== Renamed clubs ====
- Super Power Samut Prakan authorize from Jumpasri United
- Thai Honda Ladkrabang was renamed to Thai Honda

=== Expansion clubs ===
- Nakhon Pathom United and Samut Songkhram Club-licensing football club didn't pass to play 2018 Thai League 2. This team were relegated to 2018 Thai League 4 Western Region.
- Songkhla United Club-licensing football club didn't pass to play 2018 Thai League 3 Lower Region. This team is banned 2 years and Relegated to 2020 Thai League 4 Southern Region.
- Jumpasri United Club-licensing football club didn't pass to play 2018 Thai League 2. This team is banned 2 years and Relegated to 2020 Thai League 4 North Eastern Region.

== Teams ==
=== Stadium and locations ===
Locations of the 2018 Thai League 2
Football clubs in Bangkok Metropolitan Region

Team	Location	Stadium	Capacity
Angthong	Angthong	Angthong Provincial Stadium	6,000
Army United	Bangkok	Thai Army Sports Stadium	20,000
Chiangmai	Chiangmai	700th Anniversary Stadium	25,000
Kasetsart	Bangkok	TOT Stadium Chaeng Watthana	5,000
Krabi	Krabi	Krabi Provincial Stadium	6,000
Khonkaen	Khonkaen	Khonkaen PAO. Stadium	7,000
Lampang	Lampang	Lampang Provincial Stadium	5,500
Nongbua Pitchaya	Nongbua Lamphu	Nongbua Lamphu Provincial Stadium	4,333
PTT Rayong	Rayong	PTT Stadium	12,000
Rayong	Rayong	Rayong Provincial Stadium	7,500
Samut Sakhon	Samut Sakhon	Samut Sakhon Provincial Stadium	3,500
Sisaket	Sisaket	Sri Nakhon Lamduan Stadium	10,000
Thai Honda	Bangkok	72nd Anniversary Stadium (Min Buri)	10,000
Trat	Trat	Trat Provincial Stadium	6,000
Udon Thani	Udon Thani	Institute of Physical Education Udon Thani Stadium	3,500

=== Foreign players ===
Other foreign players.
AFC quota players.
ASEAN quota players.
No foreign player registered.

A T2 team could registered five foreign players by at least one player from AFC member countries and at least one player from ASEAN member countries. A team can use four foreign players on the field in each game, including at least one player from the AFC member countries or ASEAN member countries (3+1).

Note :
(substituted off) : players who released during summer transfer window;
(substituted in) : players who registered during summer transfer window.
↔: players who have dual nationality by half-caste or naturalization.

Club	Leg	Player 1	Player 2	Player 3	Player 4	Player 5
Angthong	1st	(Myanmar) Aung Kyaw Naing (substituted off)	(Albania) ↔ (Germany) Ndriqim Halili (substituted off)	(Ghana) Isaac Honny	(Spain) Gorka Unda	(Japan) Kazuki Murakami
Angthong	2nd		(Ghana) Prince Amponsah (substituted in)	(Ghana) Isaac Honny	(Spain) Gorka Unda	(Japan) Kazuki Murakami
Army United	1st	(Brazil) Diego Lima	(Brazil) Erivelto	(Brazil) Frauches	(Iraq) Anmar Almubaraki	(Singapore) Hassan Sunny
Army United	2nd	(Brazil) Diego Lima	(Brazil) Erivelto	(Brazil) Frauches	(Iraq) Anmar Almubaraki	(Singapore) Hassan Sunny
Chiangmai	1st	(Brazil) Cristian (substituted off)	(Afghanistan) Mustafa Azadzoy (substituted off)	(Brazil) Luis Verdini	(Brazil) Soares
Chiangmai	2nd	(Brazil) Lenny (substituted in)	(South Korea) Seo Dong-hyeon (substituted in)	(Brazil) Luis Verdini	(Brazil) Soares
Kasetsart	1st	(Japan) ↔ (New Zealand) Kayne Vincent (substituted off)	(Brazil) Diego (substituted off)	(Japan) Yusei Ogasawara (substituted off)	(Mali) Boubacar Koné
Kasetsart	2nd		(Brazil) Danilo (substituted in)	(South Korea) Kim Hyo-jin (substituted in)	(Mali) Boubacar Koné
Khonkaen	1st	(Brazil) David Bala (substituted off)	(Ivory Coast) Marc Landry Babo	(Bulgaria) ↔ (North Macedonia) Darko Tasevski	(South Korea) Kim Seong-hyeon	(Indonesia) Yanto Basna
Khonkaen	2nd	(Brazil) Renan Marques (substituted in)	(Ivory Coast) Marc Landry Babo	(Bulgaria) ↔ (North Macedonia) Darko Tasevski	(South Korea) Kim Seong-hyeon	(Indonesia) Yanto Basna
Krabi	1st	(Brazil) ↔ (Vietnam) Kesley Alves (substituted off)	(Chile) ↔ (Palestine) Matías Jadue (substituted off)	(Japan) Ryohei Maeda (substituted off)	(Brazil) Victor Amaro	(Ivory Coast) Koné Seydou
Krabi	2nd		(Montenegro) Ivan Vuković (substituted in)	(South Korea) Kim Gwi-hyeon (substituted in)	(Brazil) Victor Amaro	(Ivory Coast) Koné Seydou
Lampang	1st	(Japan) Kai Hirano (substituted off)	(Brazil) Pedro Paulo	(Brazil) Tiago Chulapa	(Netherlands) Melvin de Leeuw
Lampang	2nd	(Netherlands) ↔ (Afghanistan) Faysal Shayesteh (substituted in)	(Brazil) Pedro Paulo	(Brazil) Tiago Chulapa	(Netherlands) Melvin de Leeuw
Nongbua Pitchaya	1st	(Brazil) Gabriel Davis (substituted off)	(South Korea) Kim Ji-hun (substituted off)	(Brazil) Ramon	(Serbia) ↔ (France) Goran Jerković	(Singapore) Izwan Mahbud
Nongbua Pitchaya	2nd	(Brazil) Harrison Cardoso (substituted in)	(Japan) Yusei Ogasawara (substituted in)	(Brazil) Ramon	(Serbia) ↔ (France) Goran Jerković	(Singapore) Izwan Mahbud
PTT Rayong	1st	(Brazil) João Paulo (substituted off)	(Japan) Goshi Okubo (substituted off)	(Brazil) Dennis Murillo	(Brazil) Wellington Bruno	(Japan) ↔ (Indonesia) Ryuji Utomo
PTT Rayong	2nd	(Brazil) Josimar (substituted in)	(South Korea) Jung Hoon (substituted in)	(Brazil) Dennis Murillo	(Brazil) Wellington Bruno	(Japan) ↔ (Indonesia) Ryuji Utomo
Rayong	1st	(South Korea) Kim Moon-ju (substituted off)	(Brazil) Thiago Santos	(Haiti) Pascal Millien	(Japan) Seiya Sugishita
Rayong	2nd	(Brazil) Andre Araújo (substituted in)	(Brazil) Thiago Santos	(Haiti) Pascal Millien	(Japan) Seiya Sugishita
Samut Sakhon	1st	(Brazil) Valci Júnior (substituted off)	(Ivory Coast) Kouassi Yao Hermann (substituted off)	(Ivory Coast) Henri Jöel	(Japan) Kengo Ishii	(Myanmar) Kaung Sett Naing
Samut Sakhon	2nd	(Brazil) ↔ (Timor-Leste) Pedro Henrique (substituted in)	(Nigeria) Adefolarin Durosinmi (substituted in)	(Ivory Coast) Henri Jöel	(Japan) Kengo Ishii	(Myanmar) Kaung Sett Naing
Sisaket	1st		(Brazil) Igor Carneiro Luiz (substituted off)	(Brazil) Almir	(Brazil) Cristiano	(South Korea) Kim Seong-sik
Sisaket	2nd	(Laos) Soukaphone Vongchiengkham (substituted in)	(Montenegro) Žarko Korać (substituted in)	(Brazil) Almir	(Brazil) Cristiano	(South Korea) Kim Seong-sik
Thai Honda	1st	(Brazil) Wágner (substituted off)	(Brazil) Léo	(Japan) Kento Nagasaki	(Japan) Michitaka Akimoto
Thai Honda	2nd	(Brazil) Valdo (substituted in)	(Brazil) Léo	(Japan) Kento Nagasaki	(Japan) Michitaka Akimoto
Trat	1st	(Brazil) Maranhão (substituted off)	(Brazil) Barros Tardeli	(Japan) Yuki Bamba	(Japan) Hiromichi Katano
Trat	2nd	(Serbia) Milan Bubalo (substituted in)	(Brazil) Barros Tardeli	(Japan) Yuki Bamba	(Japan) Hiromichi Katano
Udon Thani	1st	(Serbia) Milan Bubalo (substituted off)	(South Korea) Kim Jae-sung (substituted off)	(Cameroon) Florent Obama	(Serbia) Miloš Stojanović	(Singapore) Baihakki Khaizan
Udon Thani	2nd	(Brazil) Gabriel Davis (substituted in)	(Japan) Sho Shimoji (substituted in)	(Cameroon) Florent Obama	(Serbia) Miloš Stojanović	(Singapore) Baihakki Khaizan

== League table ==
=== Standings ===
Pos	Team	Pld	W	D	L	GF	GA	GD	Pts	Qualification or relegation
1	PTT Rayong (C, P)	28	17	5	6	54	32	+22	56	Promotion to 2019 Thai League
2	Trat (P)	28	15	9	4	51	32	+19	54	Promotion to 2019 Thai League
3	Chiangmai (P)	28	13	11	4	45	31	+14	50	Promotion to 2019 Thai League
4	Khonkaen	28	14	7	7	52	30	+22	49	
5	Nongbua Pitchaya	28	12	9	7	32	25	+7	45	
6	Samut Sakhon	28	8	10	10	34	46	−12	34 (Note: Head-to-head record (Mini league): Samut Sakhon 12 pts, Udon Thani 11 pts, Army United 10 pts (38 goals scored), Lampang 10 pts (32 goals scored), Sisaket 9 pts.)	
7	Udon Thani	28	9	7	12	33	35	−2	34	
8	Army United	28	7	13	8	38	41	−3	34	
9	Lampang	28	8	10	10	32	35	−3	34	
10	Sisaket	28	8	10	10	29	32	−3	34	
11	Rayong	28	8	9	11	32	35	−3	33	
12	Thai Honda	28	8	8	12	32	39	−7	32	
13	Kasetsart	28	8	4	16	34	49	−15	28	
14	Krabi (R)	28	7	5	16	26	49	−23	26	Relegation to 2019 Thai League 3
15	Angthong (R)	28	5	9	14	39	52	−13	24	Relegation to 2019 Thai League 3

Source: Thai League 2
Rules for classification: 1) Points; 2) Head-to-head points; 3) Overall goals difference; 4) Overall goals scored; 5) Fair play points; 6) Play-off without extra time.
(C) Champions; (P) Promoted; (R) Relegated

=== Positions by round ===
Leader and promotion to the 2019 Thai League
Promotion to the 2019 Thai League
Relegation to the 2019 Thai League 3

The table lists the positions of teams after each week of matches. In order to preserve chronological evolvements, any postponed matches are not included in the round at which they were originally scheduled, but added to the full round they were played immediately afterwards. For example, if a match is scheduled for matchday 13, but then postponed and played between days 16 and 17, it will be added to the standings for day 16.

Team ╲ Round	1	2	3	4	5	6	7	8	9	10	11	12	13	14	15	16	17	18	19	20	21	22	23	24	25	26	27	28	29	30
PTT Rayong	2	1	4	4	2	4	3	4	3	2	2	1	1	2	4	2	3	3	3	1	1	1	1	2	2	1	1	1	1	1
Trat	3	2	1	1	3	1	2	1	2	3	3	4	4	3	2	3	2	2	2	3	2	2	2	3	3	3	3	3	2	2
Chiangmai	5	8	11	11	9	10	9	7	7	6	6	5	5	5	5	4	4	4	4	4	5	5	4	4	4	4	4	4	3	3
Khonkaen	6	5	6	5	4	3	4	3	5	4	4	3	3	4	3	5	5	5	5	5	4	3	3	1	1	2	2	2	4	4
Nongbua Pitchaya	8	4	3	2	1	2	1	2	1	1	1	2	2	1	1	1	1	1	1	2	3	4	5	5	5	5	5	5	5	5
Samut Sakhon	11	13	7	6	6	7	8	10	10	11	11	12	12	12	12	13	13	13	12	12	10	9	8	9	10	10	10	11	9	6
Udon Thani	9	3	2	3	5	5	5	6	6	7	7	8	8	7	6	6	6	6	6	7	9	10	10	11	11	11	12	9	11	7
Army United	4	7	5	7	8	6	7	9	8	9	9	9	9	10	11	11	11	9	7	6	7	6	7	6	6	6	7	8	8	8
Lampang	12	14	9	10	11	12	12	11	11	10	10	10	11	9	9	9	9	10	10	11	8	8	9	8	9	7	6	7	6	9
Sisaket	14	10	12	13	13	13	14	14	12	12	12	11	10	11	10	10	10	11	11	10	12	11	11	10	8	9	9	10	12	10
Rayong	13	9	10	8	10	8	10	8	9	8	8	6	7	8	8	7	7	8	9	8	6	7	6	7	7	8	8	6	7	11
Thai Honda	15	15	15	14	12	11	11	12	13	13	13	14	13	13	13	12	12	12	13	14	14	14	14	14	12	12	11	12	10	12
Kasetsart	1	6	8	9	7	9	6	5	4	5	5	7	6	6	7	8	8	7	8	9	11	12	12	12	13	13	13	13	13	13
Krabi	7	11	13	12	15	15	15	15	15	15	15	15	15	15	15	15	15	14	14	13	13	13	13	13	14	14	14	14	14	14
Angthong	10	12	14	15	14	14	13	13	14	14	14	13	14	14	14	14	14	15	15	15	15	15	15	15	15	15	15	15	15	15

Source: Thai League 2

=== Results by round ===
Team ╲ Round	1	2	3	4	5	6	7	8	9	10	11	12	13	14	15	16	17	18	19	20	21	22	23	24	25	26	27	28	29	30
PTT Rayong	W	W		W	W	L	W	L	W	D	W	W	D	D	L	W		D	W	W	W	L	W	L	W	W	W	L	D	W
Trat	W	W	W	W	L	W	D	D	D		W	L	W	D	W	D	W	D	D	L	W	D	W		W	D	L	W	W	W
Chiangmai	D	D	L	L	W		W	W	D	W	D	W	W	L	W	W	D	D	W		L	W	D	D	W	D	W	W	D	D
Khonkaen	D	W	L	W	W	W	L	W	L	D	W	W	D		W	L	L	D	W	L	W	W	W	W	W	D	D		L	D
Nongbua Pitchaya	D	W	W	W	W	D	W		W	D	W	L	D	W	W	L	D	D	D	W	L		L	D	L	W	L	L	W	D
Samut Sakhon	D	L	W	W	D	D	L	D	L	L	L		D	D	L	L	W	L	W	W	W	D	W	D	L		D	L	W	D
Udon Thani	D	W	W	W	L	D	D	D	D	D	L	L		W	W	L	W	L	L	L	L	L	D	L	L	W		W	L	W
Army United	D	D	W	L	D	W		D	D	D	D	L	L	D	D	L	W	W	W	D		W	L	W	L	L	D	L	D	D
Lampang		L	W	L	L	D	D	D	W	D	W	L	L	W	D	W	L	D	L	D	W	D	W	L	L	D	W	L	D	
Sisaket	L	D	L	L		L	D	D	W	D	L	W	W	L	W	L	W	D		W	L	D	D	D	W	L	D	L	D	W
Rayong	L	D	D	W	L	W	L	W	L	W		W	D	L	L	W	D	L	L	D	W	D	D	D		L	D	W	L	L
Thai Honda	L	L	D		D	W	L	L	L	D	L	D	D	W	L	W	D		L	L	L	W	D	W	W	W	D	L	W	L
Kasetsart	W		L	L	W	D	W	W	W	L	L	L	W	D	L		L	W	L	L	L	L	L	D	L	D	L	W	L	L
Krabi	D	L	L	L	L	L	L	L	L	D	W	D	L	L		W	L	W	W	D	W	L	L	D	L	L	W	W		L
Angthong	D	L	L	L	L	L	W	L		D	L	W	L	D	L	D	L	D	L	W	L	D		L	W	D	L	W	D	D

Source: Thai League 2
W = Win; D = Draw; L = Loss; = No opponent

== Results ==
Home \ Away	ANG	AMU	CMI	KST	KHO	KBI	LAM	NBP	PTT	RYG	SSK	SIS	TH	TRT	UDT
Angthong		2–2	5–6	2–1	1–3	3–1	2–1	1–1	1–1	4–4	0–0	0–0	2–1	3–3	0–1
Army United	1–0		1–1	3–3	4–2	1–1	3–3	1–1	1–2	1–6	3–0	0–0	1–0	2–2	1–0
Chiangmai	3–2	2–1		2–1	1–1	2–1	1–1	1–2	1–1	3–0	2–1	1–0	2–0	1–1	1–1
Kasetsart	1–1	2–1	1–1		2–1	5–0	2–1	0–1	1–2	2–0	0–1	3–2	1–2	0–2	1–0
Khonkaen	4–1	1–2	2–2	3–0		1–0	2–0	3–0	2–0	1–1	3–1	1–0	1–0	6–1	1–0
Krabi	2–1	2–3	0–2	1–0	1–0		0–2	0–0	0–1	1–0	1–2	2–1	1–2	1–0	1–1
Lampang	2–0	0–0	0–1	4–3	2–2	2–3		1–0	1–0	1–1	1–1	2–1	1–0	1–1	0–0
Nongbua Pitchaya	3–1	1–1	2–2	4–0	1–0	1–1	2–0		0–0	1–2	1–0	1–0	2–1	1–0	1–0
PTT Rayong	1–3	1–0	0–1	6–1	1–4	5–1	2–2	2–0		3–2	3–1	1–1	1–0	5–2	5–1
Rayong	1–0	1–1	0–2	3–2	1–1	1–0	1–0	0–2	0–2		2–2	0–0	0–0	1–2	0–1
Samut Sakhon	3–3	1–0	1–0	0–0	2–4	4–2	1–0	2–1	0–2	0–2		0–0	2–2	1–1	2–1
Sisaket	1–0	3–2	1–1	2–0	2–1	1–0	2–0	2–1	1–3	1–0	2–2		3–3	0–0	1–2
Thai Honda	1–0	1–1	2–1	0–1	2–0	0–0	2–1	3–1	0–3	1–1	3–3	1–1		1–2	3–2
Trat	2–0	2–0	1–0	2–0	2–2	4–1	1–1	0–0	5–0	1–0	4–1	3–1	2–1		3–2
Udon Thani	2–1	1–1	2–2	2–1	0–0	4–2	1–2	1–1	0–1	0–2	3–0	2–0	3–0	0–2	

Updated to match(es) played on 29 September 2018. Source: Thai League 2
Legend: Blue = home team win; Yellow = draw; Red = away team win.

== Season statistics ==
=== Top scorers ===
As of 29 September 2018.

Rank	Player	Club	Goals
1	(Brazil) Barros Tardeli	Trat	21
2	(Ghana) Isaac Honny	Angthong	17
3	(Ivory Coast) Marc Landry Babo	Khonkaen	16
4	(Brazil) Erivelto	Army United	14
4	(Brazil) Dennis Murillo	PTT Rayong	14
6	(France) Goran Jerković	Nongbua Pitchaya	13
7	(Brazil) Hiziel Souza Soares	Chiangmai	11
7	(Thailand) Thotsaphon Yotchan	Khonkaen	11
7	(Netherlands) Melvin de Leeuw	Lampang	11
7	(Thailand) Tawin Butsombat	Thai Honda	11

=== Hat-tricks ===
Player	For	Against	Result	Date
(New Zealand) Kayne Vincent	Kasetsart	Krabi	5–0	10 March 2018
(Japan) Yuki Bamba	Trat	PTT Rayong	5–0	18 March 2018
(Brazil) Dennis Murillo	PTT Rayong	Krabi	5–1	11 April 2018
(Brazil) Barros Tardeli	Trat	Krabi	4–1	13 May 2018
(France) Goran Jerković	Nongbua Pitchaya	Kasetsart	4–0	27 May 2018
(Brazil) André Araújo	Rayong	Army United	6–1	10 June 2018
(Ghana) Isaac Honny	Angthong	Rayong	4–4	22 July 2018
(Brazil) Tiago Chulapa	Lampang	Kasetsart	4–3	12 September 2018
(Thailand) Kritsana Kasemkulvilai	Samut Sakhon	Thai Honda	3–3	12 September 2018
(Thailand) Kamol Phothong	Angthong	Chiangmai	5–6	12 September 2018
(Brazil) Soares	Chiangmai	Angthong	6–5	12 September 2018

== Attendance ==
=== Overall statistics ===
Pos	Team	Total	High	Low	Average	Change
1	Khonkaen	59,647	6,489	2,363	4,261	+55.2%^{†}
2	Udon Thani	45,962	9,346	1,248	3,283	+7.9%^{†}
3	Nongbua Pitchaya	29,155	3,029	1,321	2,083	+11.1%
4	PTT Rayong	26,757	3,856	933	1,911	+3.2%
5	Rayong	23,780	3,280	414	1,699	+7.2%
6	Chiangmai	22,484	4,655	656	1,606	−39.5%
7	Trat	19,398	4,092	810	1,385	+43.1%
8	Samut Sakhon	17,389	2,578	574	1,242	−4.3%^{†}
9	Lampang	15,988	2,346	483	1,142	−29.6%
10	Angthong	12,979	1,437	410	927	−16.8%
11	Sisaket	12,818	1,629	521	916	−66.4%
12	Thai Honda	11,591	1,301	593	827	−45.8%
13	Army United	11,163	1,118	396	797	+11.0%
14	Kasetsart	8,962	2,889	289	640	−7.6%
15	Krabi	7,355	989	404	525	−21.5%
	League total	325,428	9,346	289	1,550	+11.0%

Updated to games played on 29 September 2018
Source: Thai League 2
Notes:
^{†} Teams played previous season in Thai League 3

=== Attendance by home match played ===
Team \ Match played	1	2	3	4	5	6	7	8	9	10	11	12	13	14	Total
Angthong	1,243	1,437	833	497	410	916	753	1,226	948	1,190	1,072	1,058	437	959	12,979
Army United	1,118	866	794	396	900	764	1,093	682	735	862	840	869	772	472	11,163
Chiangmai	1,823	1,483	656	1,172	1,008	1,109	1,239	1,119	1,991	1,532	1,239	1,725	1,733	4,655	22,484
Kasetsart	2,889	475	520	422	319	920	422	572	412	315	520	375	289	512	8,962
Khonkaen	2,363	2,763	3,488	3,250	3,120	3,698	4,118	5,373	3,375	4,621	4,953	6,118	5,918	6,489	59,647
Krabi	989	664	598	525	443	492	492	493	404	437	435	483	450	450	7,355
Lampang	1,420	1,287	1,322	1,054	1,177	2,346	1,309	1,187	981	808	790	1,018	483	806	15,988
Nongbua Pitchaya	2,000	1,926	2,348	2,142	2,140	2,025	2,781	2,243	2,344	3,029	1,678	1,726	1,321	1,452	29,155
PTT Rayong	2,575	3,856	1,439	933	1,780	2,480	1,897	1,365	2,058	1,611	1,942	1,625	1,701	1,495	26,757
Rayong	1,040	1,220	1,380	414	1,986	1,960	1,480	1,840	1,540	1,840	1,890	1,680	2,230	3,280	23,780
Samut Sakhon	574	2,123	1,685	2,578	923	1,263	873	936	873	1,076	1,183	1,164	1,153	985	17,389
Sisaket	1,629	1,261	875	694	594	1,131	984	704	800	912	1,162	847	704	521	12,818
Thai Honda	727	626	701	661	593	850	812	910	950	1,004	1,096	670	690	1,301	11,591
Trat	1,007	1,123	1,367	1,092	1,290	981	1,175	819	1,189	810	1,045	1,936	1,472	4,092	19,398
Udon Thani	6,000	5,300	9,346	4,534	4,282	3,038	1,792	2,144	1,874	1,598	1,888	1,248	1,270	1,648	45,962

Source: Thai League 2

== See also ==
- 2018 Thai League 1
- 2018 Thai League 3
- 2018 Thai League 4
- 2018 Thailand Amateur League
- 2018 Thai FA Cup
- 2018 Thai League Cup
- 2018 Thailand Champions Cup
