= Thanakorn Thong-in =

Thai footballer (born 1981)

Personal information
- Full name: Thanakorn Thong-in
- Date of birth: October 20, 1981 (age 45)
- Place of birth: Ratchaburi, Thailand
- Height: 1.85 m (6 ft 1 in)
- Position: Goalkeeper

Team information
- Current team: Nakhon Pathom
- Number: 20

Senior career*
Years	Team	Apps	(Gls)
2009–present	Nakhon Pathom		
- * Club domestic league appearances and goals as of 14 November 2008

Thanakorn Thong-in is a Thai professional footballer who currently plays for Nakhon Pathom in the Thailand Premier League.
