= Adisorn Saeng-ruang =

Thai footballer (born 1986)

Personal information
- Full name: Adisorn Saeng-ruang
- Date of birth: September 21, 1986 (age 40)
- Place of birth: Ratchaburi, Thailand
- Height: 1.69 m (5 ft 6 1/2 in)
- Position: Midfielder

Senior career*
Years	Team	Apps	(Gls)
2009–2022	Nakhon Pathom		
- * Club domestic league appearances and goals as of 14 November 2008

Adisorn Saeng-ruang (Thai: อดิศร แสงเรือง) is a Thai professional footballer who played for Nakhon Pathom in the Thailand Premier League.
