= Phumipat Kanthanet =

Thai footballer (born 1995)

Personal information
- Full name: Phumipat Kanthanet
- Date of birth: 21 May 1995 (age 31)
- Place of birth: Maha Sarakham, Thailand
- Height: 1.81 m (5 ft 11 1/2 in)
- Position: Left winger

Team information
- Current team: Nakhon Pathom United
- Number: 38

Senior career*
| Years | Team | Apps | (Gls) |
| 2018 | North Bangkok University | | |
| 2019–2023 | Chainat Hornbill | 112 | (5) |
| 2023 | Trat | 9 | (0) |
| 2024–2025 | Nakhon Si United | 39 | (2) |
| 2025– | Nakhon Pathom United | 16 | (3) |
- * Club domestic league appearances and goals as of 2 April 2026

Phumipat Kanthanet (Thai: ภูมิพัฒน์ กันทะเนตร, born May 21, 1995) is a Thai professional footballer who plays as a left-winger for Thai League 2 club Nakhon Pathom United.
