= Mohamed Essam (Egyptian footballer) =

Egyptian footballer (born 1994)

Mohammed Essameldin
Personal information
- Full name: Mohammed Essameldin Sabe
- Date of birth: 1 January 1994 (age 32)
- Place of birth: Cairo, Egypt
- Height: 1.77 m (5 ft 10 in)
- Position: Attacking midfielder

Team information
- Current team: Nakhon Si United
- Number: 21

Youth career
- 2006–2008: Arab Contractors
- 2008–2011: Wadi Degla

Senior career*
Years	Team	Apps	(Gls)
2011–2013	Wadi Degla	2	(0)
2013–2014	Legia Warsaw II	7	(0)
2014	Ismaily SC	0	(0)
2014–2016	Al Nasr SC	12	(1)
2016	Nadwiślan Góra	13	(4)
2016–2017	Stal Stalowa Wola	10	(3)
2017	MKS Kluczbork	13	(2)
2017–2018	El-Entag El-Harby	14	(1)
2018–2019	Górnik Łęczna	16	(1)
2019–2021	Arab Contractors	27	(6)
2021	Bank Al Ahly	9	(0)
2021–2022	Eastern Company	8	(0)
2022	Nakhon Pathom United	11	(2)
2023	Trat	16	(12)
2023–2025	The Cong-Viettel	17	(2)
2025	Trat	7	(2)
2026–	Nakhon Si United	0	(0)

International career
2013	Egypt U20	4	(1)
- * Club domestic league appearances and goals as of 1 December 2025

Mohammed Essam Mohammed (Arabic: محمد عصام محمد; born 1 January 1994) is an Egyptian professional footballer who plays as attacking midfielder for Thai League 2 club Nakhon Si United.

== Career ==
Essam joined Legia Warsaw II in May 2013. His contract was terminated in January 2014. In February it was announced that Essam was on trial for Finnish club FC Jazz.

He has previously played for Wadi Degla FC in the Egyptian Premier League. Essam has also been a member of the Egypt U20 squad.

Later on, he went back to Egypt to join Ismaily SC and Al Nasr, before returning to Poland to play for Nadwiślan Góra, Stal Stalowa Wola and MKS Kluczbork. He later joined El-Entag El-Harby, Górnik Łęczna and Arab Contractors. In January 2021, he transferred to Bank Al Ahly for a transfer fee worth EGP 2.5 million.

Essam's show of skills in one of Bank Al Ahly's league matches angered the opponent Makkasa SC resulting in a controversial suspension imposed by his club and eventual free transfer to the Egyptian Premier League debutant Eastern Company.
