= Rattaporn Saetan =

Thai footballer

Personal information
- Full name: Rattaporn Saetan
- Date of birth: 26 January 1984 (age 42)
- Place of birth: Trat, Thailand
- Height: 1.81 m (5 ft 11 1/2 in)
- Position: Striker

Senior career*
Years	Team	Apps	(Gls)
2007–2008	Chanthaburi	39	(23)
2009–2010	Rajnavy Rayong	8	(1)
2011	Chanthaburi		
2012–2013	Trat	44	(22)
2014–2016	Krabi		
2016	→ Samutsongkhram (loan)		
2017	Singburi Bangrajun		
2018–	Marines Eureka		
- * Club domestic league appearances and goals as of 14 November 2008

Rattaporn Saetan (Thai: รัฐพร แซ่ตั๋น; born January 26, 1984) is a Thai professional footballer.
