= Phayong Khunnaen =

Thai football manager

Personal information
- Full name: Phayong Khunnaen
- Date of birth: 21 April 1967 (age 59)
- Place of birth: Bangkok, Thailand

Team information
- Current team: Police Tero (club advisor)

Managerial career
- Years: Team
- 2005–2006: Thailand U20
- 2007: Thailand U17
- 2011: BEC Tero Sasana
- 2012: Esan United
- 2013: Suphanburi
- 2014: Songkhla United
- 2015: PTT Rayong
- 2015: Thailand U17
- 2016: Chiangmai
- 2016–2017: Nakhon Pathom United
- 2018–2021: Trat
- 2022–2025: Kanchanaburi City
- 2025: Trat
- 2025–2026: Police Tero
- 2026–: Police Tero (club advisor)

Phayong Khunnaen (Thai: พยงค์ ขุนเณร) is a Thai association football manager, he is the currently club advisor of Thai League 2 club Police Tero.

== Managerial statistics ==
As of match played 15 March 2026

Managerial record by team and tenure
Team	Nat.	From	To	Record					Ref.
Team	Nat.	From	To	G	W	D	L	Win %	Ref.
Suphanburi	(Thailand)	1 January 2013	30 November 2013	32	14	9	9	43.75	
Songkhla United	(Thailand)	1 January 2014	31 July 2014	25	6	6	13	24.00	
Trat	(Thailand)	22 February 2019	31 May 2021	69	19	13	37	27.54	
Trat	(Thailand)	20 January 2024	1 October 2025	21	6	2	13	28.57	
Police Tero	(Thailand)	6 November 2025	Present	20	6	8	6	30.00	
Career Total				167	51	38	78	30.54	

== Honours ==
Manager

Thailand under-20

- Hassanal Bolkiah Trophy: 2005

Thailand under-16/17

- 2007 AFF U-17 Youth Championship; Winners
- 2015 AFF U-16 Youth Championship; Winners
