= Diego Silva (footballer, born 1990) =

Brazilian professional footballer

Personal information
- Full name: Diego Oliveira Silva
- Date of birth: 26 December 1990 (age 35)
- Height: 1.80 m (5 ft 11 in)
- Position: Forward

Team information
- Current team: Roi Et PB United
- Number: 17

Youth career
- 2009–2010: AD Guarulhos Academy

Senior career*
Years	Team	Apps	(Gls)
2011–2013	Guarulhos		
2013	GRECAL	14	(5)
2014	Santacruzense	16	(1)
2014–2015	Five Islands	17	(9)
2015	Tanabi	17	(8)
2015–2016	Parham	5	(2)
2016	Dong Thap	14	(1)
2017	Nonthaburi United S.Boonmeerit	27	(17)
2018–2019	Nakhon Pathom United	50	(42)
2020–2021	Haiphong	24	(5)
2021–2022	Nakhon Si United	23	(9)
2022–2023	Chainat Hornbill	34	(14)
2023–2024	Masfout	3	(0)
2024	Trat	15	(3)
2024–	Roi Et PB United	0	(0)
- * Club domestic league appearances and goals as of 30 December 2024

Diego Oliveira Silva (born 26 December 1990) is a Brazilian professional footballer who plays as a forward.

== Career ==
=== Brazil ===
Diego Silva was born in Guarulhos. In 2009, he joined Guarulhos Academy in Brazil, then signed his first professional contract with Guarulhos in 2011. In 2013, he moved to Parana and signed with GRECAL, and later moved to Santacruzense in 2014.

=== Antigua and Barbuda ===
In 2014, he moved to Antigua and Barbuda and signed with Five Islands. After an impressive season he gained interest from other Antigua and Barbuda clubs, and chose Parham.

=== Dong Thap ===
In 2016, Diego received an offer from Vietnam club Dong Thap. After one season with Đồng Tháp in Vietnam, he moved to Thailand.

=== Nonthaburi United S.Boonmeerit ===
In 2017, Diego signed with Bangkok based club Nonthaburi United S.Boonmeerit. In 2017 Thai League 4 Western Region, Diego scored 13 goals in the season and Nonthaburi United S.Boonmeerit gained promotion to Thai League 3. Diego became the top scorer in the league and received an offer from Nakhon Pathom United.

=== Nakhon Pathom United ===
In 2018, Diego Silva signed with Thai League 4 side Nakhon Pathom United and gained promotion to Thai League 3. He was the top scorer for Nakhon Pathom, scoring 29 goals, and signed another season contract. In 2019, Diego again became the top scorer in Thai League 3 as well, scoring 13 goals. Nakhon Pathom won Thai League 3 and was promoted to Thai League 2.

=== Haiphong ===
After an impressive performance in Nakhon Pathom's 2019, Diego joined Vietnamese club Haiphong in January 2020.

== Career statistics ==
Appearances and goals by club, season and competition
Club	Season	League			National Cup		League Cup		Continental		Other		Total	
Club	Season	Division	Apps	Goals	Apps	Goals	Apps	Goals	Apps	Goals	Apps	Goals	Apps	Goals
Nonthaburi United S.Boonmeerit	2017	Thai League 4	27	17	0	0	0	0	–		–		27	17
Nakhon Pathom United	2018–19	Thai League 3	50	42	0	0	0	0	0		0	0	50	42
Haiphong	2020	V.League 1	8	0	0	0	0	0	–		8	0	0	0
Total			85	59									85	59
Career total			85	59	0	0	0	0	-	-	0	0	85	59

== Honours ==
BTU United

- Thai League 4: 2017

NakhonPathom United

- Thai League 4: 2018
- Thai League 3: 2019

Individual

- Thai League 4 top scorer: 2017
- Thai League 4 top scorer: 2018
- Thai League 3 top scorer: 2019
- Thai League 3 MVP: 2019
