= Willian Sarôa =

Brazilian footballer (born 1987)

Personal information
- Full name: Willian Sarôa de Souza
- Date of birth: 18 September 1987 (age 39)
- Place of birth: São Paulo, Brazil
- Height: 1.85 m (6 ft 1 in)
- Position: Midfielder

Senior career*
Years	Team	Apps	(Gls)
2007	Grêmio Mauaense		
2007	Ivinhema Mauciense		
2007	Ferroviário (CE)		
2008	União Futebol Clube		
2008–2009	Vaduz	13	(0)
2009	Flamengo de Guarulhos		
2010	Paulista		
2010	Ituiutaba		
- * Club domestic league appearances and goals as of 1 April 2010

Willian Sarôa de Souza (born 18 September 1987 in São Paulo, São Paulo state) is a Brazilian footballer who plays for Liechtenstein's only professional club FC Vaduz at Swiss Super League

== Career ==
He moved to Vaduz on 1 July 2008.

Willian Sarôa played for Campeonato Paulista Série A2 side Associação Atlética Flamengo during 2009, before moving to Paulista Futebol Clube at the beginning of 2010. He would make five Campeonato Paulista appearances for Paulista before going on loan to Paulista rivals Ituiutaba Esporte Clube in February 2010.
