= 2018 Thai League 4 Western Region =

Thai League 4 Western Region
- Season: 2018
- Champions: Nakhon Pathom United
- Relegated: Nonthaburi
- Matches played: 108
- Goals scored: 261 (2.42 per match)
- Top goalscorer: (Brazil) Olveira Silva Diego (29 goals)
- Biggest home win: Nakhon Pathom United 5–0 Look Isan (17 February 2018); Nakhon Pathom United 5–0 Chainat Hornbill U-23 (22 April 2018)
- Biggest away win: Chainat Hornbill U-23 1–5 Nakhon Pathom United (11 February 2018)
- Highest scoring: 9 goals Look Isan 4–5 Chainat United (25 February 2018)
- Longest winning run: 13 matches Nakhon Pathom United
- Longest unbeaten run: 13 matches Nakhon Pathom United
- Longest losing run: 5 matches Chainat Hornbill U-23
- Highest attendance: 1,250; Nakhon Pathom United 1–0 Chainat United (24 March 2018)
- Lowest attendance: 30; IPE Samut Sakhon United 3–1 Chainat United (12 May 2018)
- Total attendance: 31,010
- Average attendance: 293

2018 Thai League 4 Western Region is the 6th season of the League competition since its establishment in 2013. It is in the 4th tier of the Thai football league system.

== Changes from last season ==
=== Team changes ===
==== Promoted Clubs ====
Promoted from the 2017 Thailand Amateur League Central Region

- Chainat United

Promoted to the 2018 Thai League 3 Lower Region

- BTU United

Promoted to the 2018 Thai League 3 Upper Region

- Muangkan United

==== Relegated Clubs ====
Relegated from the 2017 Thai League 2

- Nakhon Pathom United
- Samut Songkhram

Relegated to the 2017 Thailand Amateur League Central Region

- Pathum Thani United

==== Withdrawn Clubs ====
Ratchaburi Mitr Phol B and Suphanburi B were taking a 1-year break.

=== Expansion Clubs ===
- Nakhon Pathom United and Samut Songkhram Club-licensing football club didn't pass to play 2018 Thai League 2. This team were relegated to 2018 Thai League 4 Western Region.

=== Reserving Clubs ===
- Chainat Hornbill U-23 is Chainat Hornbill Reserving this team which join Northern Region first time.

== Teams ==
=== Stadium and locations ===
Locations of the 2018 Thai League 4 Western Region Teams
Football clubs in Bangkok Metropolitan Region

| Team | Province | Stadium | Ref. |
|---|---|---|---|
| Assumption United | Bangkok | Assumption Thonburi School Stadium (Wongprachanukul Stadium) | |
| Chainat Hornbill U-23 | Chainat | Khao Plong Stadium | |
| Chainat United | Chainat | Nong Mamong Stadium | |
| Hua Hin City | Prachuap Khiri Khan | Khao Takiap Stadium | |
| IPE Samut Sakhon United | Samut Sakhon | IPE Samut Sakhon Stadium | |
| Look Isan | Bangkok | Ramkhamhaeng University Stadium | |
| Nakhon Pathom United | Nakhon Pathom | Nakhon Pathom Municipality Sport School Stadium | |
| Nonthaburi | Nonthaburi | Nonthaburi Sports Complex Stadium | |
| Samutsongkhram | Samut Songkhram | Samut Songkhram PAO. Stadium | |

== League table ==
| Pos | Team | Pld | W | D | L | GF | GA | GD | Pts | Qualification or relegation |
|---|---|---|---|---|---|---|---|---|---|---|
| 1 | Nakhon Pathom United (C, Q) | 24 | 19 | 3 | 2 | 63 | 16 | +47 | 60 | Qualification to Group Stage round of Thai League 4 Champions League |
| 2 | IPE Samut Sakhon United (Q) | 24 | 12 | 6 | 6 | 31 | 18 | +13 | 42 | Qualification to Group Stage round of Thai League 4 Champions League |
| 3 | Huahin City (Q) | 24 | 12 | 3 | 9 | 37 | 35 | +2 | 39 | Qualification to Play-off round of Thai League 4 Champions League |
| 4 | Samutsongkhram | 24 | 10 | 8 | 6 | 28 | 29 | −1 | 38 | |
| 5 | Chainat United | 24 | 9 | 5 | 10 | 33 | 33 | 0 | 32 | |
| 6 | Look E-San | 24 | 9 | 2 | 13 | 31 | 42 | −11 | 29 | |
| 7 | Assumption United | 24 | 8 | 4 | 12 | 30 | 35 | −5 | 28 | |
| 8 | Nonthaburi (R) | 24 | 5 | 6 | 13 | 17 | 35 | −18 | 21 | Relegation to the 2019 Thailand Amateur League |
| 9 | Chainat Hornbill U-23 | 24 | 3 | 5 | 16 | 17 | 44 | −27 | 14 | Could not compete in 2019 Thai League 4 |

Updated to match(es) played on 25 August 2018. Source: Thai League 4
Rules for classification: 1) Points; 2) Head-to-head points; 3) Overall goals difference; 4) Overall goals scored; 5) Fair play points; 6) Play-off without extra time;).
(C) Champions; (Q) Qualified for the phase indicated; (R) Relegated

=== Results by match played ===
| Team ╲ Round | 1 | 2 | 3 | 4 | 5 | 6 | 7 | 8 | 9 | 10 | 11 | 12 | 13 | 14 | 15 | 16 | 17 | 18 | 19 | 20 | 21 | 22 | 23 | 24 |
|---|---|---|---|---|---|---|---|---|---|---|---|---|---|---|---|---|---|---|---|---|---|---|---|---|
| Nakhon Pathom United | W | W | W | W | W | W | W | W | W | W | W | W | W | L | W | W | W | W | D | D | W | W | D | L |
| IPE Samut Sakhon United | W | D | L | D | L | W | W | D | W | D | L | W | L | W | W | W | W | L | D | W | D | W | L | W |
| Hua Hin City | D | D | W | L | L | W | W | L | L | W | W | L | L | W | W | L | D | L | W | W | L | W | W | W |
| Samutsongkhram | D | D | W | W | L | W | L | W | L | W | L | W | D | D | L | D | W | W | D | D | W | L | D | W |
| Chainat United | D | L | W | D | L | W | L | L | W | L | W | L | W | W | W | D | D | W | W | L | L | D | L | L |
| Look Isan | W | L | L | L | W | W | D | L | L | L | L | W | W | W | L | L | W | L | L | D | L | W | L | W |
| Assumption United | L | L | W | L | W | L | D | W | L | W | L | L | D | L | D | W | L | W | D | W | L | L | W | L |
| Nonthaburi | L | D | W | L | L | L | L | W | W | D | L | L | L | D | L | D | L | W | L | L | D | W | L | D |
| Chainat Hornbill B | L | W | D | L | L | L | D | L | L | W | L | L | L | L | D | D | L | L | L | L | L | W | L | D |

Source: Thai League 4
W = Win; D = Draw; L = Loss

== Results 1st and 2nd match for each team ==
| Home \ Away | ASU | CHB | CNU | HHC | ISU | LES | NAK | NBR | SAM |
|---|---|---|---|---|---|---|---|---|---|
| Assumption United | | 0–0 | 3–1 | 1–2 | 0–1 | 3–0 | 0–1 | 0–1 | 2–2 |
| Chainat Hornbill U-23 | 2–2 | | 1–0 | 1–2 | 1–2 | 2–3 | 1–5 | 0–0 | 1–1 |
| Chainat United | 4–1 | 3–4 | | 1–0 | 0–0 | 2–1 | 2–1 | 2–1 | 1–2 |
| Hua Hin City | 3–1 | 3–2 | 0–0 | | 1–3 | 0–1 | 2–4 | 2–1 | 3–2 |
| IPE Samut Sakhon United | 1–0 | 1–0 | 3–1 | 1–0 | | 2–0 | 0–2 | 1–1 | 0–2 |
| Look Isan | 0–2 | 1–0 | 4–5 | 3–2 | 0–0 | | 1–3 | 2–0 | 3–2 |
| Nakhon Pathom United | 3–1 | 5–0 | 1–0 | 2–0 | 1–0 | 5–0 | | 3–0 | 3–0 |
| Nonthaburi | 0–2 | 1–0 | 1–2 | 0–1 | 1–1 | 1–0 | 1–3 | | 1–2 |
| Samutsongkhram | 0–3 | 1–0 | 1–1 | 1–1 | 1–0 | 1–0 | 0–3 | 1–1 | |

Updated to match(es) played on 1 July 2018. Source: Thai League 4
Legend: Blue = home team win; Yellow = draw; Red = away team win.

== Results 3rd match for each team ==
In the third leg, the winner on head-to-head result of the first and the second leg will be home team. If head-to-head result are tie, must to find the home team from head-to-head goals different. If all of head-to-head still tie, must to find the home team from penalty kickoff on the end of each second leg match (This penalty kickoff don't bring to calculate points on league table, it's only the process to find the home team on third leg).

| Home \ Away | ASU | CHB | CNU | HHC | ISU | LES | NAK | NBR | SAM |
|---|---|---|---|---|---|---|---|---|---|
| Assumption United | | 1–0 | | | | 2–4 | | 1–0 | 0–1 |
| Chainat Hornbill U-23 | | | 0–3 | | | | | 1–1 | |
| Chainat United | 1–2 | | | 1–1 | | 1–0 | | | |
| Hua Hin City | 2–1 | 2–0 | | | | | | 4–1 | 0–1 |
| IPE Samut Sakhon United | 4–0 | 0–1 | 3–1 | 3–0 | | 1–0 | | 1–2 | |
| Look Isan | | 3–1 | | 2–3 | | | | 1–0 | |
| Nakhon Pathom United | 2–2 | 4–0 | 1–0 | 2–3 | 2–2 | 2–0 | | 4–0 | 1–1 |
| Nonthaburi | | 0–0 | | | | | | | |
| Samutsongkhram | | 1–0 | 1–0 | | 1–1 | 2–2 | | 1–2 | |

Updated to match(es) played on 25 August 2018. Source: Thai League 4
Legend: Blue = home team win; Yellow = draw; Red = away team win.

== Season statistics ==
=== Top scorers ===
As of 25 August 2018.

| Rank | Player | Club | Goals |
|---|---|---|---|
| 1 | (Brazil) Olveira Silva Diego | Nakhon Pathom United | 29 |
| 2 | (Ghana) Dennis Borketey | Look Isan (5), Samut Prakan (7) | 12 |
| 3 | (Guinea) Almamy Sylla | IPE Samut Sakhon United | 11 |
| 4 | (Thailand) Natthapat Rak-yu | Chainat United | 10 |
| 4 | (Thailand) Teerayut Ngamlamai | Nakhon Pathom United | 10 |
| 6 | (Thailand) Chalermsak Ruaygrabue | Assumption United | 8 |
| 6 | (Thailand) Arnon Kaimook | Hua Hin City | 8 |
| 6 | (Thailand) Supanai Baipa-om | Grakcu Sai Mai United (3), Look Isan (5) | 8 |
| 9 | (Thailand) Panthakant Tiengnae | Hua Hin City | 7 |
| 10 | (Thailand) Woraphot Somsang | Samutsongkhram (6), BTU United (1) | 6 |
| 10 | (Iran) Mirzajani Tafreshi Nima | Samutsongkhram | 6 |

=== Hat-tricks ===
| Player | For | Against | Result | Date |
|---|---|---|---|---|
| (Brazil) Olveira Silva Diego^{4} | Nakhon Pathom United | Look Isan | 5–0 | 17 February 2018 |
| (Thailand) Chalermsak Ruaygrabue | Assumption United | Chainat United | 3–1 | 11 March 2018 |
| (Brazil) Olveira Silva Diego^{4} | Nakhon Pathom United | Chainat Hornbill U-23 | 5–0 | 22 April 2018 |
| (Guinea) Almamy Sylla | IPE Samut Sakhon United | Chainat United | 3–1 | 12 May 2018 |
| (Thailand) Nakul Pinthong | Nakhon Pathom United | Chainat Hornbill U-23 | 4–0 | 7 July 2018 |

== Attendances ==
| Pos | Team | Total | High | Low | Average | Change |
|---|---|---|---|---|---|---|
| 1 | Nakhon Pathom United | 13,394 | 1,250 | 530 | 837 | −23.2% |
| 2 | Nonthaburi | 3,025 | 992 | 125 | 335 | −11.8% |
| 3 | Hua Hin City | 2,845 | 610 | 50 | 237 | +55.9% |
| 4 | Samutsongkhram | 2,862 | 450 | 80 | 220 | −63.1% |
| 5 | Chainat United | 2,243 | 321 | 90 | 187 | n/a |
| 6 | Chainat Hornbill U-23 | 1,481 | 360 | 78 | 165 | n/a |
| 7 | Assumption United | 1,913 | 325 | 96 | 159 | −44.0% |
| 8 | Look Isan | 1,597 | 300 | 100 | 145 | −5.8% |
| 9 | IPE Samut Sakhon United | 1,650 | 300 | 30 | 138 | −27.0% |
| | League total | 31,010 | 1,250 | 30 | 293 | +3.2% |

Updated to games played on 25 August 2018
Source: Thai League 4

=== Attendances by home match played ===
| Team \ Match played | 1 | 2 | 3 | 4 | 5 | 6 | 7 | 8 | 9 | 10 | 11 | 12 | 13 | 14 | 15 | 16 | Total |
|---|---|---|---|---|---|---|---|---|---|---|---|---|---|---|---|---|---|
| Assumption United | 273 | 172 | 123 | 175 | 112 | 325 | 155 | 115 | 125 | 127 | 115 | 96 | | | | | 1,913 |
| Chainat Hornbill U-23 | 145 | 170 | 102 | 78 | 360 | 130 | 250 | 141 | 105 | | | | | | | | 1,481 |
| Chainat United | 200 | 301 | 321 | 155 | 251 | 90 | 125 | 260 | 150 | 120 | 120 | 150 | | | | | 2,243 |
| Hua Hin City | 610 | 200 | 200 | 135 | 200 | 200 | 150 | 250 | 150 | 50 | 200 | 500 | | | | | 2,845 |
| IPE Samut Sakhon United | 100 | 300 | 200 | 100 | Unk.1 | 30 | 100 | 120 | 100 | 150 | 200 | 150 | 100 | | | | 1,650 |
| Look Isan | 140 | 130 | 125 | 100 | 300 | 120 | 100 | 120 | 200 | 160 | 102 | | | | | | 1,597 |
| Nakhon Pathom United | 1,231 | 842 | 1,250 | 530 | 1,058 | 852 | 832 | 836 | 874 | 632 | 710 | 534 | 816 | 732 | 853 | 812 | 13,394 |
| Nonthaburi | 450 | 436 | 992 | 250 | 200 | 250 | 162 | 150 | 125 | | | | | | | | 3,015 |
| Samutsongkhram | 400 | 295 | 450 | 344 | 305 | 175 | 158 | 80 | 185 | 136 | 85 | 117 | 132 | | | | 2,862 |

Source: Thai League 4 Note:
Unk.1 Some error of T4 official match report 28 April 2018 (IPE Samut Sakhon United 1–1 Nonthaburi).

== See also ==
- 2018 Thai League
- 2018 Thai League 2
- 2018 Thai League 3
- 2018 Thai League 4
- 2018 Thailand Amateur League
- 2018 Thai FA Cup
- 2018 Thai League Cup
- 2018 Thailand Champions Cup
