= Valdo (footballer, born 1988) =

Brazilian footballer

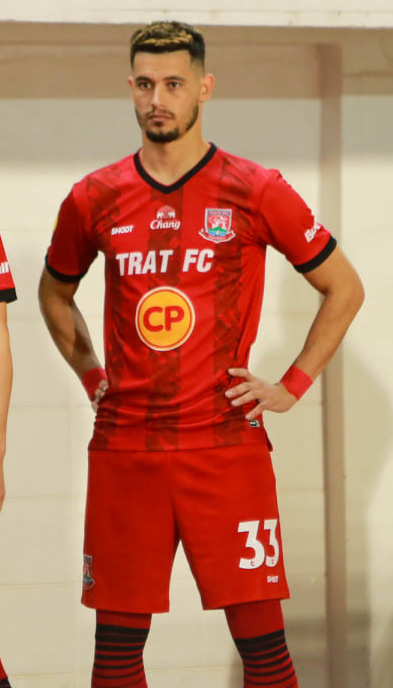

Personal information
- Full name: Valdomiro Soares Eggres
- Date of birth: 8 February 1988 (age 38)
- Place of birth: Alegrete, Brazil
- Height: 1.83 m (6 ft 0 in)
- Position: Winger

Team information
- Current team: Police Tero
- Number: 7

Senior career*
| Years | Team | Apps | (Gls) |
| 2007–2010 | Brusque | 3 | (0) |
| 2010 | → Atlético Tubarão (loan) | 0 | (0) |
| 2011 | Criciúma | 15 | (0) |
| 2011 | Boa | 7 | (1) |
| 2011–2012 | Criciúma | 14 | (3) |
| 2013 | Veranópolis | 13 | (1) |
| 2013 | Brasília | 5 | (0) |
| 2014 | Campinense | 3 | (5) |
| 2014–2015 | Ituano | 0 | (0) |
| 2014–2015 | Ethnikos Achna | 29 | (10) |
| 2015–2017 | Air Force Central | 23 | (12) |
| 2018 | Pafos | 3 | (3) |
| 2018–2019 | Thai Honda | 62 | (20) |
| 2020–2021 | Nongbua Pitchaya | 31 | (14) |
| 2021–2023 | Trat | 60 | (27) |
| 2023–2024 | Nakhon Si United | 37 | (13) |
| 2024–2025 | Nakhon Pathom United | 29 | (5) |
| 2025– | Police Tero | 34 | (6) |
- * Club domestic league appearances and goals as of 18 May 2026

Valdomiro Soares Eggres (born 8 February 1988), simply known as Valdo, is a Brazilian professional footballer who plays for Police Tero in Thai League 2 as a forward.

After playing for a host of clubs in Brazil, on 27 June 2014 he signed for Cypriot club Ethnikos Achna.

== Honour ==
Nongbua Pitchaya

- Thai League 2 Champions : 2020–21
