= Trat Province Stadium =

Multi-purpose stadium in Trat Province, Thailand

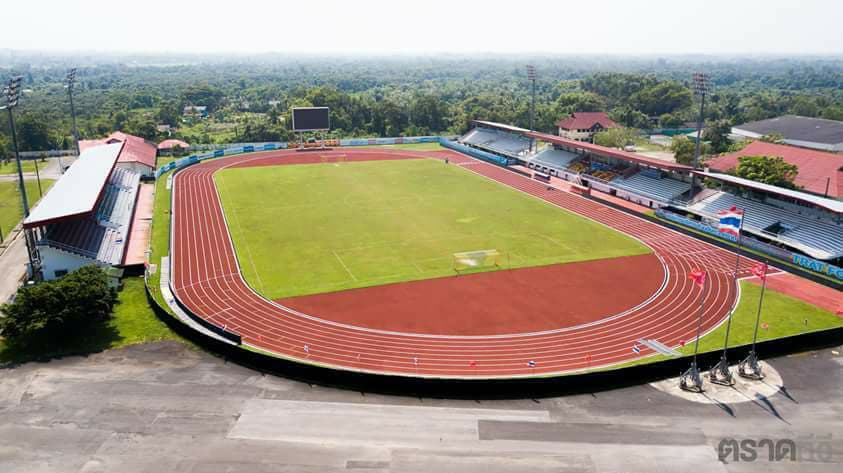
- Interactive map of Trat Province Stadium
- Location: Trat, Thailand
- Coordinates: 12°14′02″N 102°31′30″E
- Owner: Trat Provincial Administration Organization
- Operator: Trat Provincial Administration Organization
- Capacity: 5,000
- Surface: Grass

Tenant
- Trat F.C. (2012–present)

Trat Province Stadium (Thai: สนามกีฬาจังหวัดตราด) is a multi-purpose stadium in Trat Province, Thailand. It is currently used mostly for football matches and is the home stadium of Trat. The stadium holds 6,000 people.
