= Florent Obama =

Cameroonian footballer (born 1991)

Personal information
- Full name: Joseph Florent Obama
- Date of birth: 15 December 1991 (age 34)
- Place of birth: Buea, Cameroon
- Height: 1.86 m (6 ft 1 in)
- Position: Defender

Senior career*
Years	Team	Apps	(Gls)
2011–2013	Buriram United	38	(3)
2013	→ Chainat Hornbill (loan)	4	(0)
2013	Sukhothai	0	(0)
2015	Moghreb Tétouan	2	(0)
2016	Ayutthaya	0	(0)
2017–2018	Udon Thani	44	(3)
2019	Customs United	0	(0)
2020	Muangkan United	0	(0)
2022–2023	Rayong	27	(1)
2023–2024	Suphanburi	28	(1)
- * Club domestic league appearances and goals as of 30 April 2023

Florent Obama (born 15 December 1991) is a Cameroonian professional footballer who plays as a defender.

== Career ==
Obama began playing football at l'École de Football des Brasseries du Cameroun (EFBC) in Douala. He moved abroad to play in Thailand before joining Moroccan side Moghreb Tétouan in 2015.

== Honours ==
Buriram United

- Thai Premier League: 2011
- Thai FA Cup: 2011
