= Nakhon Pathom United F.C. =

Thai football club

Nakhon Pathom United นครปฐม ยูไนเต็ด
- Full name: Nakhon Pathom United Football Club สโมสรฟุตบอล นครปฐม ยูไนเต็ด
- Nicknames: The King Tigers (เสือป่าราชา)
- Founded: 1999; 27 years ago
- Ground: Nakhon Pathom Municipality Sport School Stadium; Nakhon Pathom, Thailand
- Capacity: 6,000
- Chairman: Panuwat Sasomsup
- Head coach: Thongchai Sukkoki
- League: Thai League 2
- 2024–25: Thai League 1, 15th of 16 (relegated)
Home colours	Away colours	Third colours

Nakhonp Pathom United Football Club (Thai: สโมสรฟุตบอลนครปฐมยูไนเต็ด), is a Thailand professional football club based in Nakhon Pathom province and currently play in Thai League 2, the second tier of the Thai football league system. Their home stadium is Nakhon Pathom Municipality Sport School Stadium. In the 2008 season, the club finished at 9th place which became the highest league position in the club history.

In 2018, The club-licensing of this team didn't meet the requirements to play in the 2018 Thai League 2 and the team was relegated to the 2018 Thai League 4 Western Region. The club then won the Thai League 4 title thus getting promoted to the 2019 Thai League 3 season. Nakhon Pathom United then won the 2019 Thai League 3 Lower Region winning back-to-back league title seeing the club promoted to the 2020–21 Thai League 2 season.

In 2023, Nakhon Pathom United won the Thai League 2 as champions for the first time in the club history and come back to the Thai League 1 after 14 years.

== History ==
=== Formation and early years (1999–2006) ===
Nakhon Pathom United was founded in 1999, the club started playing in the Thailand Provincial League. In 2004, Nakhon Pathom finished the season on a mid-table in the league. In the year 2005 it was the first time a place among the top three will be achieved and promote to the Thai Premier League was narrowly missed.

=== Promotion to the top flight (2007–2009) ===
A year later, the result could be repeated. But the club was allowed to ascend to the highest league in Thailand, as was the second-placed a reserve team of Port. The association brought not only as a "provincial team," a new impetus in the league. But also the fans who traveled to away games and many were present at the home games. Nakhon Pathom United was another club as well as Chonburi and Suphanburi the club in the Premier League who did not came from the capital Bangkok.

The first season in the Premier League, the club was able to finish in 11th place and boosted its bottom line a year later at number nine. For the 2009 season was the first time be with Michael Aspin and Michael Thomas Byrne committed two players from Great Britain, Both had already played together in England at Northwich Victoria.

=== Relegation and suspension (2010–2016) ===
Nakhon Pathom United were suspended for two years following the final play-off game of the 2010 season after a fracas in the penultimate game of the play-offs with Sisaket United, a game that Nakhon Pathom United had to win to ensure that they would be promoted. The club are set to return to Division 1 for the 2013 campaign after serving their two-year punishment.

=== Sukkoki years and resurgence (2017–2022) ===
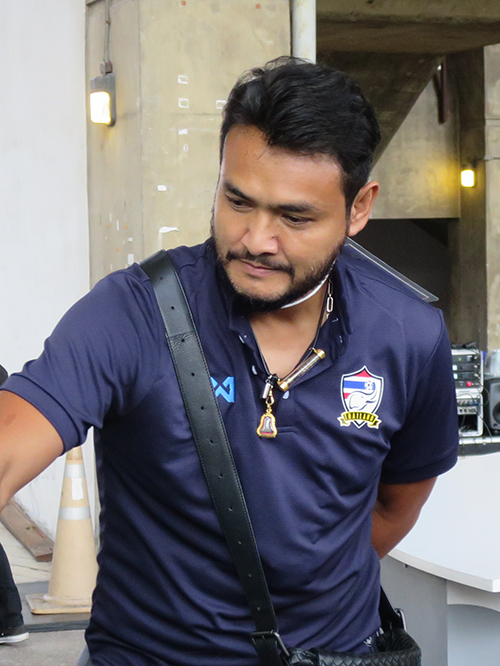
Thongchai Sukkoki, head coach of Nakhon Pathom United from 2017 to May 2023.

In 2017, Nakhon Pathom United administratively relegated to by FA Thailand because the club did not send documents about club licensing in time.

2017	Thai League 2	(Tier 2)
2018	Thai League 4	(Tier 4)
2019	Thai League 3	(Tier 3)
2020	Thai League 2	(Tier 2)
2021	Thai League 2	(Tier 2)
2022	Thai League 2	(Tier 2)

After the club relegation to Thai League 4, Thongchai Sukkoki was hired as the club's coach. Nakhon Pathom United started again in the Tier 4 league by creating a new team and searching for young players from the initial selection of footballers, with only three players left from the previous season. Nakhon Pathom went on to won the 2018 Thai League 4 Western Region. In 2019, Thongchai Sukkoki won his second title after winning the 2019 Thai League 3 Lower Region and was promoted to Thai League 2. Under Sukkoki's management, the King Tiger play a style of football based on maintaining possession by building from the back, and good as combination play.

In 2023, Sukkoki led Nakhon Pathom United won 2022–23 Thai League 2 title and the club was promoted to Thai League 1 after a 14-year exile. On 8 May 2023, BG Pathum United appointed Sukkoki as the Rabbits' new head coach in the final league game and The Revo Cup 2022-23 final as well as the start of the Thai League 1 next season after being with Nakhon Pathom United for 6 years.

=== Back to Thai League 1 (2023–2025) ===
After Thongchai Sukkoki is appointed as BG Pathum United's head coach, Singaporean Akbar Nawas was hired as the club's head coach on 5 June 2023 ahead of the 2023–24 Thai League 1 season. Akbar guided the club to their highest ever recorded win in their history for second time in one season with both matches coming against Mahajak Samutprakan 7–0 on 5 October 2023 and Thai Spirit 10–0 on 1 November 2023 in the 2023–24 Thai FA Cup.

=== Relegation to Thai League 2 (2025–present) ===
Nakhon Pathom United was than relegated in the 2024–25 season thus playing their pride in Thai League 2.

== Kit suppliers and shirt sponsors ==
List of Nakhon Pathum United partners after their suspended years.

Period	Kit manufacturer	Main sponsor
2013	(Thailand) Kool	(Thailand) JC
2014–2015	(Thailand) Kool	(Thailand) Chang
2026–2023	In house production	(Thailand) Chang
2023–2024	(Thailand) Ocel	(Thailand) Chang
2024–2025	(England) Umbro	(Thailand) Chang

== Academy development ==
Nakhonpathom United opened its first youth academies in 2019 under the name The king tiger academy. The club's first technical director is Thongchai Sukkoki. The club started sending youth teams, under-10 and under-12, to participate in the 2021 Thailand Youth League.

== Stadium ==
Nakhon Pathom United currently play their home matches at Nakhon Pathom Municipality Sport School Stadium which is a sports stadium in Nakhon Pathom province, Thailand. The stadium holds 3,500 people.

The club's chairman Panuwat Sasomsup has plans to build a new football stadium, with based ideas similar to the Dragon Solar Park of Ratchaburi as a model, but downsizing the capacity to 10,000 seats.

Coordinates	Location	Stadium	Capacity	Year
13°49′14″N 100°02′55″E	Nakhon Pathom	Sanam Chan Palace Sports Stadium	6,000	2007–2008
14°01′16″N 99°59′03″E	Nakhon Pathom	Kasetsart Kampangsan University Stadium	4,000	2009–2010
13°47′57″N 100°03′19″E	Nakhon Pathom	Nakhon Pathom Municipality Sport School Stadium	3,500	2013–present

== Players ==
=== Current squad ===
Note: Flags indicate national team as defined under FIFA eligibility rules; some limited exceptions apply. Players may hold more than one non-FIFA nationality.

No.	Pos.	Nation	Player
2	DF	THA	Thanakrit Phonthongtin
3	DF	IRI	Amir Ali Chegini
4	DF	THA	Banjong Phadungpattanodom
5	DF	THA	Methus Worapanichakarn
7	MF	THA	Pansiri Sukunee
8	DF	THA	Pitipol Prachayamongkol
9	FW	BRA	Elias Emanuel De Magalhaes Souza
10	FW	BRA	Douglas Tardin
11	MF	THA	Panutach Rungjang
14	MF	THA	Kongphop Luadsong
17	DF	THA	Teeranut Ruengsamut
19	GK	THA	Kiadtisak Chaodon
21	DF	THA	Kylian Dendoune
22	MF	THA	Pheemphapob Viriyachanchai

No.	Pos.	Nation	Player
23	MF	THA	Sunchai Chaolaokhwan
26	GK	THA	Kawin Pitaksalee
27	FW	THA	Thitipat Ekarunpong (on loan from BG Pathum United)
28	DF	THA	Thanathorn Chanphet
30	GK	THA	Kittinard Khamkaew
38	FW	THA	Phumipat Kanthanet
45	FW	THA	Thanathorn Chanphet
47	DF	THA	Auttapon Sangtong
49	MF	THA	Pakaphum Meekwan
54	DF	THA	Teerapat Ketstri
64	MF	THA	Kasidit Kalasin
79	FW	THA	Phophiang Sriphat
83	GK	THA	Rittikrai Nisaitong
88	MF	THA	Nutthapong Chuekamut
89	DF	THA	Kridsada Limseeput
97	MF	IRI	Mahan Rahmani

=== Out on loan ===
Note: Flags indicate national team as defined under FIFA eligibility rules; some limited exceptions apply. Players may hold more than one non-FIFA nationality.

No. / Pos. / Nation / Player	No. / Pos. / Nation / Player

== Management and technical staff ==
Management
Position	Name
Chairman	(Thailand) Panuwat Sasomsup
Chief Executive Officer	(Thailand) Chutinan Sasomsap
Sporting Director	(Thailand) Narong Huayhongthong

Technical stafff
Position	Name
Head coach	(Thailand) Thongchai Sukkoki
Assistant coach	(Thailand) Worawut Wangsawad
Goalkeeper coach	(Thailand) Prakobsuk Phungkul

== Honours ==
=== Domestic leagues ===
- Thai League 2
  - Champions (1): 2022–23
- Thai League 3
  - Runners-up (1): 2019
- Thai League 3 Lower Region
  - Champions (1): 2019
- Thai League 4
  - Champions (1): 2018
- Thai League 4 Western Region
  - Winners (1): 2018

== Player records ==
As of 1 February 2026

- Biggest wins: 10–0 vs Thai Spirit (1 November 2023)
- Heaviest defeats: 6–0 vs Port (26 May 2024)
- Youngest goal scorers: Phuwanet Thongkui ~ 19 years 5 months 26 days old (On 5 October 2022 vs Mahajak Samutprakan)
- Oldest goal scorers: (Brazil) Osvaldo Neto ~ 38 years 6 months 27 days old (On 3 April 2022 vs Muangkan United)
- Youngest ever debutant: Phuwanet Thongkui ~ 18 years 5 months 24 days old (On 3 October 2021 vs Ayutthaya United)
- Oldest ever player: Anukorn Sangrum ~ 41 years 2 months 12 days old (On 12 December 2025 vs Bangkok FC)

== Former players ==
=== International capped players ===
AFC/OFC.: (Afghanistan) Mustafa Azadzoy; (Indonesia) Meshaal Hamzah; (Iran) Saeid Chahjouei; (Laos) Phithack Kongmathilath; (Laos) Phoutthasay Khochalern; (Malaysia) Fergus Tierney; (Malaysia) Muhammad Khalil; (Myanmar) Zaw Min Tun; (North Korea) Kim Song-yong	CAF.: (Cameroon) Jacques Nguemaleu; (Egypt) Mohamed Essam; (Ghana) Kwame Karikari; (Liberia) Keith Nah; (Zambia) Noah Chivuta	UEFA.: - NIL -	CONMEBOL/ CONCACAF.: (El Salvador) Léster Blanco

== Managerial history ==
Name	Period	Honours
Chatchai Paholpat	2008–2009	
Piyapong Pue-on	2009	
Anusorn Chumduangjai	2010	
Vimol Jankam	2010–2014	
Peter Withe	2014–2015	
Jason Withe	2015–2016	
Thawatchai Damrong-Ongtrakul	2016	
Phayong Khunnaen	2016–2017	
Thongchai Sukkoki	2018–2023	2018 Thai League 4 2019 Thai League 3 Lower Region 2022–23 Thai League 2
Akbar Nawas	2023–2024	
Sirisak Yodyardthai	2024	
Thongchai Sukkoki (2)	2024–present	

== Season by season record ==
Season	League									FA Cup	League Cup	Top scorer	
Season	Division	P	W	D	L	F	A	Pts	Pos	FA Cup	League Cup	Name	Goals
1999/2000	PRO	22	8	7	7	34	24	31	6th				
2001	PRO	22	7	7	8	29	27	28	7th				
2002	PRO	10	1	4	5	6	14	7	5th				
2003	PRO	22	8	6	8	44	34	30	7th				
2004	PRO	18	9	4	5	34	20	31	3rd				
2005	PRO	22	12	6	4	49	26	23	3rd				
2006	PRO	30	17	11	2	42	15	62	3rd				
2007	TPL	30	8	13	9	30	29	37	11th				
2008	TPL	30	11	4	15	24	38	37	9th				
2009	TPL	30	6	7	17	32	53	25	16th	R3			
2010	DIV 1	30	12	15	3	53	36	51	5th	QF	R2	Phuwadol Suwannachart	13
2011/12	Suspended for two years^{1}												
2013	DIV 1	34	9	12	13	47	51	39	12th	R2	R2	Cho Kwang-Hoon	7
2014	DIV 1	34	9	15	10	43	39	42	13th	R2	R1	Jeong Woo-geun	16
2015	DIV 1	38	17	18	13	58	47	59	5th	R3	R1	Jeong Woo-geun	20
2016	DIV 1	26	6	10	10	29	42	28	12th	R1	R2	Yusei Ogasawara	10
2017	T2	32	10	12	10	43	38	42	7th	QR	Opted out	Berlin Ndebe-Nlome	14
2018	T4 West	24	19	3	2	63	16	60	1st	R3	R2	Diego Oliveira Silva	29
2019	T3 Lower	26	18	7	1	57	18	61	1st	R1	QRP	Diego Oliveira Silva	13
2020–21	T2	34	17	10	7	66	36	61	3rd	QR	–	Tauã	23
2021–22	T2	34	10	12	12	42	47	42	10th	R2	R1	Neto Santos	9
2022–23	T2	34	16	12	6	32	20	60	1st	R3	R2	Peter Nergaard	8
2023–24	T1	30	8	9	13	37	53	33	12th	R3	R1	Lesley Ablorh	10
2024–25	T1	30	5	8	17	30	59	23	15th	R2	R2	Taku Ito; Valdo	5
2025–26	T2	34	10	9	15	29	37	39	15th	R3	R1		

^{1} Nakhon Pathom were suspended for two years following the final playoff game, all results stood.

Champions	Runners-up	Third place	Promoted	Relegated

- P = Played
- W = Games won
- D = Games drawn
- L = Games lost
- F = Goals for
- A = Goals against
- Pts = Points
- Pos = Final position
- TPL = Thai Premier League
- QR1 = First Qualifying Round
- QR2 = Second Qualifying Round
- QR3 = Third Qualifying Round
- QR4 = Fourth Qualifying Round
- RInt = Intermediate Round
- R1 = Round 1
- R2 = Round 2
- R3 = Round 3
- R4 = Round 4
- R5 = Round 5
- R6 = Round 6
- GR = Group stage
- QF = Quarter-finals
- SF = Semi-finals
- RU = Runners-up
- S = Shared
- W = Winners
