= Trat F.C. =

Thai football club, based in Trat

Trat ตราด เอฟซี
- Full name: Trat Football Club สโมสรฟุตบอลจังหวัดตราด
- Nicknames: The White Elephants (ช้างขาวจ้าวเกาะ)
- Short name: TFC
- Founded: 2012
- Dissolved: 2026
- Ground: Trat Province Stadium; Trat, Thailand
- Capacity: 6,000
Home colours	Away colours	Third colours

Trat Football Club (Thai: สโมสรฟุตบอลจังหวัดตราด) was a Thai defunct football club based in Trat province.

== History ==
Trat Football Club was formed in 2012, nicknamed The White Elephants. They were admitted to the 2011 Regional League Division 2 Central & Eastern Region. In their first season, they were kicked out in the third round of the 2012 Thai FA Cup after they fielded an unregistered player in their penalty shoot out win over Army United and scraped into 3rd in Central/East division to make Regional league playoffs. Trat was promoted to 2013 Thai Division 1 League as the first attempt after topping Group B.

During the 2015 Thai Division 1 League, Trat was relegated to the third division after finishing in last place during the league. In the following season, Trat ended up winning the 2016 Thai Division 2 League Eastern Region thus gaining promotion.

In the 2018 season, Trat finished in second place, two points away from league champions PTT Rayong. Trat then earned promotion to the top flight for the first time in the club history.

Trat then played in the 2019 Thai League 1 season where they finished in 10th place in their first season, however in the 2020–21 season, the club was relegated back to Thai League 2.

In the 2022–23 season, Trat finished the season in 2nd place thus gaining promotion back to the top flight for the second time. However, the club didn't last long in the top flight where they was relegated in the 2023–24 season.

In 2026 the club has disbanded due to failing to submit club licensing documents to participate in the competition.

== Stadium and locations ==
Coordinates	Location	Stadium	Capacity	Year
12°14′02″N 102°31′30″E	Trat	Trat Province Stadium	4,000	2012–present

== Season-by-season record ==
Season	League									FA Cup	League Cup	Top scorer	
Season	Division	P	W	D	L	F	A	Pts	Pos	FA Cup	League Cup	Name	Goals
2012	DIV2 Central-East	34	20	11	3	66	34	71	3rd	R3	R2	Rattaporn Saetan	17+(5)
2013	DIV1	34	12	11	11	59	60	47	6th	R4	R1	Woukoue Mefire Raymond	9
2014	DIV1	34	14	7	13	47	33	49	7th	R4	Opted out	Seiya Sugishita	12
2015	DIV1	38	7	6	25	35	100	27	20th	Opted out	Opted out	Borce Manevski	9
2016	DIV2 Eastern	22	16	4	2	45	19	52	Champions	R2	Opted out	Erivaldo	11+(1)
2017	T2	32	9	10	13	49	59	34	15th	R2	Opted out	Barros Tardeli	18
2018	T2	28	15	9	4	51	32	54	2nd	R3	R1	Barros Tardeli	21
2019	T1	30	9	8	13	47	47	35	10th	QF	R1	Lonsana Doumbouya	20
2020–21	T1	30	4	5	21	31	64	17	15th	QF	–	Ricardo Santos	10
2021–22	T2	34	20	8	6	55	33	68	3rd	Opted out	Opted out	Paulo Conrado	19
2022–23	T2	34	17	9	8	55	34	60	2nd	Opted out	Opted out	Ferreira dos Santos	15
2023–24	T1	30	6	8	16	40	64	26	16th	R1	R2	Lidor Cohen	8
2024–25	T2	32	9	6	17	36	49	33	15th	Opted out	Opted out	Phillerson	10
2025–26	T2	34	12	8	14	49	53	44	9th	Opted out	Opted out	Phillerson	9

Champions	Runners-up	Third place	Promoted	Relegated

- P = Played
- W = Games won
- D = Games drawn
- L = Games lost
- F = Goals for
- A = Goals against
- Pts = Points
- Pos = Final position
- TPL = Thai Premier League
- QR1 = First Qualifying Round
- QR2 = Second Qualifying Round
- QR3 = Third Qualifying Round
- QR4 = Fourth Qualifying Round
- RInt = Intermediate Round
- R1 = Round 1
- R2 = Round 2
- R3 = Round 3
- R4 = Round 4
- R5 = Round 5
- R6 = Round 6
- GR = Group stage
- QF = Quarter-finals
- SF = Semi-finals
- RU = Runners-up
- S = Shared
- W = Winners
- DIS = Disqualified

== Managerial history ==
Coaches by years (2013–present)

- (Thailand) Harnarong Chunhakunakorn 2013 –2014
- (Thailand) Krit Singha-preecha 2014 –2015
- (Thailand) Praphan Narkpong 2015 –2016
- (Thailand) Somkiat Fongpech 2016 –2017
- (Thailand) Worakorn Wichanarong 2017
- (Thailand) Dusit Chalermsan 2017 –2018
- (Thailand) Phayong Khunnaen 2018 –2021
- (Thailand) Somchai Chuayboonchum 2021 –2022
- (Thailand) Harnarong Chunhakunakorn 2022 –2023
- (Thailand) Santi Chaiyaphuak 2023 –2024
- (Thailand) Krongpol Daorueang 2024
- (Thailand) Somchai Makmool 2024 –2025
- (Thailand) Phayong Khunnaen 2025
- (Thailand) Santi Chaiyaphuak 2026

== Honours ==
- Thai League 2
  - Runners-up (2): 2018, 2022–23
- Regional League Division 2
  - Runners-up (1): 2012
- Regional League Eastern Division
  - Champions (1): 2016
