= 2024–25 Thai League 1 =

Season of association football league

Thai League 1
- Season: 2024–25
- Dates: 9 August 2024 – 30 April 2025
- Champions: Buriram United; 11th Thai League 1 title
- Relegated: Khonkaen United; Nakhon Pathom United; Nongbua Pitchaya
- 2025–26 ACL Elite league stage: Buriram United
- 2025–26 ACL Elite qualifiers: Bangkok United
- 2025–26 ACL Two group stage: BG Pathum United; Ratchaburi
- Matches: 240
- Goals: 732 (3.05 per match)
- Top goalscorer: Guilherme Bissoli (25 goals)
- Biggest home win: 9 goals total Buriram United 9–0 Khonkaen United (19 January 2025)
- Biggest away win: 5 goals total Chiangrai United 0–5 Buriram United (25 August 2024)
- Highest scoring: 11 goals total Khonkaen United 4–7 Ratchaburi (6 April 2025)
- Longest winning run: 5 matches Bangkok United; BG Pathum United; Buriram United
- Longest unbeaten run: 15 matches Bangkok United; Buriram United
- Longest winless run: 13 matches Nakhon Pathom United
- Longest losing run: 5 matches Khonkaen United
- Highest attendance: 31,305; Buriram United 0–1 Port (2 February 2025)
- Lowest attendance: 1,132; Nakhon Pathom United 2–2 Port (13 April 2025)
- Total attendance: 1,158,056
- Average attendance: 4,825
- All statistics correct as of 30 April 2025.

The 2024–25 Thai League 1 was the 28th season of the Thai League 1, the top Thai professional league for association football clubs, since its establishment in 1996. A total of 16 teams competed in the league.

The summer transfer window period was open from 25 May to 9 August 2024 while the winter transfer window period was open from 19 December 2024 to 17 January 2025.

Buriram United defended their championship from the previous season, while Bangkok United was a close second.

== Changes from last season ==
=== Team changes ===
==== Promoted clubs ====
Promoted from the 2023–24 Thai League 2

- Nakhon Ratchasima
- Nongbua Pitchaya
- Rayong

==== Relegated clubs ====
Relegated from the 2023–24 Thai League 1

- Chonburi
- Police Tero
- Trat

== Teams ==
Locations of the 2024–25 Thai League teams
Football clubs in the Bangkok Metropolitan Region

There are 16 clubs in the league, with three promoted teams from Thai League 2 replacing the three teams that were relegated from the 2023-24 season.

Chonburi, Police Tero and Trat were relegated at the end of the 2023–24 season after finishing in the bottom three places of the table. Trat made their immediate return to the second-tier, Police Tero ended a 4-year stint in the top-flight, while Chonburi ended a 19-year tenure in the top-flight. The three were replaced by 2023-24 Thai League 2 champions Nakhon Ratchasima F.C., who are returning to the top-flight after a single year away. They were joined by runners-up Nongbua Pitchaya, who are also returning to the top-flight after a single year away and were promoted for the second time in their history to the top-flight and Rayong, the promotion playoff winner which was first held in 2020–21 season, who are returning to the top-flight after 3-years away and like Nongbua Pitchaya they also were promoted for the second time in their history to the top-flight.

== Stadium and locations ==
Note: Table lists in alphabetical order.

Team	Province	Stadium	Capacity
Bangkok United	Pathum Thani (Rangsit)	Thammasat Stadium	25,000
BG Pathum United	Pathum Thani (Thanyaburi)	BG Stadium	15,114
Buriram United	Buriram	Chang Arena	32,600
Chiangrai United	Chiang Rai	Singha Chiangrai Stadium	11,354
Khonkaen United	Khon Kaen	Khonkaen PAO. Stadium	7,000
Lamphun Warriors	Lamphun	Lamphun Warriors Stadium	5,000
Muangthong United	Nonthaburi	Thunderdome Stadium	15,000
Nakhon Pathom United	Nakhon Pathom	Nakhon Pathom Municipality Sport School Stadium	6,000
Nakhon Ratchasima	Nakhon Ratchasima	80th Birthday Stadium	25,000
Nongbua Pitchaya	Nongbua Lamphu	Pitchaya Stadium	6,000
Port	Bangkok (Khlong Toei)	PAT Stadium	12,308
PT Prachuap	Prachuap Khiri Khan	Sam Ao Stadium	5,000
Ratchaburi	Ratchaburi	Dragon Solar Park	10,000
Rayong	Rayong	Rayong Provincial Stadium	7,500
Sukhothai	Sukhothai	Thung Thalay Luang Stadium	8,000
Uthai Thani	Uthai Thani	Uthai Thani Provincial Stadium	5,477

== Personnel and sponsoring ==
Note: Flags indicate national team as has been defined under FIFA eligibility rules. Players may hold more than one non-FIFA nationality.

Team	Manager	Captain	Kit manufacturer	Main kit sponsor	Other kit sponsor(s)
Bangkok United	(Thailand) Totchtawan Sripan	(Brazil) Everton	(Thailand) Ari	True (Domestic) / CP (ACLE and ACL2)	List: Front: CP, 7-Eleven, Euro Cake; Back: CP Axtra, Makro, Lotus's, Daikin; Sleeves: Toyota Sure; Shorts: None
BG Pathum United	(Thailand) Supachai Komsilp (Interim)	(Thailand) Chanathip Songkrasin	(United States) Nike	Leo (Domestic and ACC)	List: Front: Boon Rawd Brewery, Gomuc, Euro Cake, Asset Wise; Back: Stiebel Eltron, Yanmar; Sleeves: AIA, Mitsubishi Electric; Shorts: None
Buriram United	(Brazil) Osmar Loss	(Thailand) Narubadin Weerawatnodom	(Thailand) Made by club (Domestic) (Thailand) Ego Sport (ACLE)	Chang (Domestic, ACLE, and ACC)	List: Front: Yamaha; Back: Coca-Cola; Sleeves: CP, M-150, Muang Thai Insurance, True, Dunlopillo; Shorts: None
Chiangrai United	(Thailand) Worawut Wangsawad	(Thailand) Sivakorn Tiatrakul	(Thailand) Grand Sport	Singha Lemon Soda	List: Front: Thai AirAsia, TOA; Back: Singha Park Chiangrai, Carrier; Sleeves: Toyota Chiangrai, Haier; Shorts: None
Khon Kaen United	(Thailand) Patipat Rorbru	(Philippines) Joshua Grommen	(Italy) Kappa	Mitr Phol	List: Front: Leo, Fitness First; Back: SixNature Airport; Sleeves: Ratchaphruek Hospital, Wuling; Shorts: None
Lamphun Warriors	(Brazil) Alexandre Gama	(Thailand) Sarawut Inpaen	(Thailand) Made by club	Chang	List: Front: Betagro, Jele, Muang Thai Insurance; Back: Tanaka Precision; Sleeves: Jetts Fitness, Gassan Khuntan Golf Resort; Shorts: None
Muangthong United	(Italy) Gino Lettieri	(Thailand) Picha Autra	(Thailand) Ego Sport	Yamaha (Domestic and ACL2)	List: Front: Mitsubishi Heavy Industries, Wonder Group; Back: OR, Coca-Cola; Sleeves: AIA, Leo, BGF; Shorts: None
Nakhon Pathom United	(Thailand) Thongchai Sukkoki	(Thailand) Chokchai Chuchai	(England) Umbro	Chang	List: Front: Jele, ICE-LED; Back: Oishi Green Tea, Est Cola, 100plus; Sleeves: Muang Thai Insurance, Central Pattaya, Supersports; Shorts: None
Nakhon Ratchasima	(Thailand) Teerasak Po-on	(Thailand) Nattapong Sayriya	(Thailand) Volt	Mazda	List: Front: Leo, Energy Absolute, SGK; Back: Carrier, GS Battery, FastFac, Thai AirAsia, Major Group; Sleeves: Muang Thai Insurance; Shorts: None
Nongbua Pitchaya	(Thailand) Sukrit Yothee	(Thailand) Nuttawut Khamrin	(Thailand) Ego Sport	Leo	List: Front: Pitchaya, JS.Sport; Back: Solar Wing; Sleeves: Udon Thani International School; Shorts: None
Port	(Thailand) Choketawee Promrut (Interim)	(Thailand) Tanaboon Kesarat	(Thailand) Grand Sport	Muang Thai Insurance (Domestic and ACL2)	List: Front: Leo, Port Authority of Thailand; Back: Port Authority of Thailand; Sleeves: TQM Insurance Broker, Muang Thai Life Assurance, MedPark; Shorts: None
PT Prachuap	(Thailand) Sasom Pobprasert	(Thailand) Nattapon Malapun	(Thailand) Volt	PTG Energy	List: Front: Chang, 2Gear; Back: Coral Hotel Bang Saphan, PPP Green Complex, Autobacs, Maxnitron; Sleeves: SSI, Bendix; Shorts: None
Rayong	(Thailand) Jukkapant Punpee	(Thailand) Wasusiwakit Phusirit	(Thailand) YG	WHA Group	List: Front: None; Back: WHA Group, IRPC, Gulf, Thai AirAsia, Origin; Sleeves: VSK, JGC, Aerosoft; Shorts: None
Ratchaburi	(Thailand) Worrawoot Srimaka	(Thailand) Jakkaphan Kaewprom	(Thailand) Ego Sport	Chang	List: Front: Euro Cake; Back: None; Sleeves: Master Vet; Shorts: None
Sukhothai	(Thailand) Aktaporn Chalitaporn	(Thailand) Piyarat Lajungreed	(Italy) Kappa	Chang	List: Front: None; Back: Zand Morada; Sleeves: Bangkok Airways, SC Group, Reparil; Shorts: None
Uthai Thani	(Serbia) Miloš Joksić	(Brazil) Ricardo Santos	(Spain) Kelme	GRC	List: Front: Chang, G9 Gold, Princ Hospital Uthai Thani, Dutch Mill; Back: Cosmogold; Sleeves: None; Shorts: None

=== Managerial changes ===
Team	Outgoing manager	Manner of departure	Date of vacancy	Position in the table	Incoming manager	Date of appointment
Buriram United	(Brazil) Emerson	End of caretaker tenure	26 May 2024	Pre-season	(Brazil) Osmar Loss	26 June 2024
Ratchaburi	(Spain) Carlos Peña	End of contract	26 May 2024	Pre-season	(Thailand) Surapong Kongthep	28 June 2024
Rayong	(Thailand) Pipob On-Mo	Signed by Chonburi	26 May 2024	Pre-season	(Brazil) Carlos Eduardo Parreira	15 June 2024
Sukhothai	(Japan) Sugao Kambe	Mutual consent	31 May 2024	Pre-season	(Thailand) Aktaporn Chalitaporn	2 June 2024
Chiangrai United	(Brazil) Gabriel Magalhães	End of contract	6 June 2024	Pre-season	(Spain) Xavi Moro	1 July 2024
Muangthong United	(Serbia) Miloš Joksić	Mutual consent	23 June 2024	Pre-season	(Italy) Gino Lettieri	6 July 2024
Uthai Thani	(Thailand) Jukkapant Punpee	Sacked	26 August 2024	15th	(Serbia) Miloš Joksić	26 August 2024
Khon Kaen United	(Thailand) Tana Chanabut	Resigned	31 August 2024	16th	(Serbia) Srdan Trailovic	5 September 2024
Nakhon Pathom United	(Singapore) Akbar Nawas	Sacked	6 September 2024	15th	(Thailand) Sirisak Yodyardthai	11 September 2024
Ratchaburi	(Thailand) Surapong Kongthep	Resigned	16 September 2024	8th	(Thailand) Somchai Maiwilai	17 September 2024
BG Pathum United	(Japan) Makoto Teguramori	Sacked	8 October 2024	5th	(Thailand) Surachai Jaturapattarapong	8 October 2024
Rayong	(Brazil) Carlos Eduardo Parreira	Sacked	28 October 2024	13th	(Thailand) Prasit Taodee (Interim)	2 November 2024
Port	(Thailand) Rangsan Viwatchaichok	Resigned	2 November 2024	3rd	(Thailand) Choketawee Promrut (Interim)	3 November 2024
Rayong	(Thailand) Prasit Taodee (Interim)	End of interim spell	11 November 2024	13th	(Thailand) Jukkapant Punpee	11 November 2024
Port	(Thailand) Wasapol Kaewpaluk	End of interim spell	11 November 2024	3rd	(Thailand) Rangsan Viwatchaichok	11 November 2024
Nakhon Pathom United	(Thailand) Sirisak Yodyardthai	Appointed as technical director	16 November 2024	16th	(Thailand) Thongchai Sukkoki	16 November 2024
Chiangrai United	(Spain) Xavi Moro	Sacked	19 November 2024	14th	(Thailand) Piyaphon Phanichakul	20 November 2024
Ratchaburi	(Thailand) Somchai Maiwilai	End of interim spell	20 November 2024	14th	(Thailand) Worrawoot Srimaka	20 November 2024
Khon Kaen United	(Serbia) Srdan Trailovic	Appointed as technical director	7 December 2024	14th	(Thailand) Patipat Rorbru	7 December 2024
Chiangrai United	(Thailand) Piyaphon Phanichakul	Stepped down	22 December 2024	14th	(Brazil) Wilson James Dos Santos (Interim)	1 January 2025
BG Pathum United	(Thailand) Surachai Jaturapattarapong	Resigned	15 January 2025	4th	(Thailand) Supachai Komsilp (Interim)	16 January 2025
Port	(Thailand) Rangsan Viwatchaichok	Resigned	15 January 2025	3rd	(Thailand) Choketawee Promrut (Interim)	16 January 2025
Port	(Thailand) Choketawee Promrut	Appointed as team consultant	24 January 2025	14th	(Thailand) Wasapol Kaewpaluk	24 January 2025
BG Pathum United	(Thailand) Supachai Komsilp	End of Interim spell	2 February 2025	6th	(United States) (England) Anthony Hudson	3 February 2025
Chiangrai United	(Brazil) Wilson James Dos Santos (Interim)	End of Interim spell	22 February 2025	12th	(Thailand) Worawut Wangsawad	22 February 2025
BG Pathum United	(United States) (England) Anthony Hudson	Sacked	4 April 2025	3rd	(Thailand) Supachai Komsilp (Interim)	5 April 2025

== League table ==
Pos	Team	Pld	W	D	L	GF	GA	GD	Pts	Qualification
1	Buriram United (C)	30	22	4	4	92	20	+72	70	Qualification for AFC Champions League Elite League stage and ASEAN Club Championship group stage
2	Bangkok United	30	21	6	3	63	30	+33	69	Qualification for AFC Champions League Elite qualifiers and ASEAN Club Championship group stage
3	BG Pathum United	30	15	8	7	47	34	+13	53	Qualification for AFC Champions League Two group stage and ASEAN Club Championship group stage
4	Ratchaburi	30	15	7	8	65	47	+18	52	Qualification for AFC Champions League Two group stage
5	Port	30	13	9	8	52	39	+13	48	
6	Muangthong United	30	13	6	11	46	39	+7	45	
7	PT Prachuap	30	12	8	10	49	39	+10	44	
8	Lamphun Warriors	30	9	10	11	36	39	−3	37 (Note: Lamphun Warriors is ahead on the head-to-head record; Lamphun Warriors 4 pts , Uthai Thani 1 pts.)	
9	Uthai Thani	30	9	10	11	37	35	+2	37	
10	Sukhothai	30	9	9	12	47	54	−7	36	
11	Chiangrai United	30	11	3	16	33	51	−18	36	
12	Rayong	30	8	8	14	41	59	−18	32	
13	Nakhon Ratchasima	30	7	11	12	36	57	−21	32	
14	Nongbua Pitchaya (R)	30	6	9	15	37	62	−25	27	Relegation to Thai League 2
15	Nakhon Pathom United (R)	30	5	8	17	30	59	−29	23	Relegation to Thai League 2
16	Khonkaen United (R)	30	4	6	20	21	68	−47	18	Relegation to Thai League 2

Source: Thai League
Rules for classification: Season in progress: 1) Points; 2) Goal difference; 3) Goals scored; End of season: 1) Points; 2) Head-to-head points; 3) Head-to-head goal difference; 4) Goals scored.
(C) Champions; (R) Relegated

=== Positions by round ===
The table lists the positions of teams after each week of matches. In order to preserve chronological evolvements, any postponed matches are not included in the round at which they were originally scheduled, but added to the full round they were played immediately afterwards. For example, if a match is scheduled for matchday 13, but then postponed and played between days 16 and 17, it will be added to the standings for day 16.

Team ╲ Round	1	2	3	4	5	6	7	8	9	10	11	12	13	14	15	16	17	18	19	20	21	22	23	24	25	26	27	28	29	30
Buriram United	1	1	1	1	1	1	1	1	1	1	2	2	2	2	1	1	1	1	1	1	1	1	1	1	1	1	1	1	1	1
Bangkok United	6	9	8	4	3	4	3	3	3	3	1	1	1	1	2	2	2	2	2	2	2	2	2	2	2	2	2	2	2	2
BG Pathum United	2	5	12	7	4	6	4	4	5	5	4	4	4	5	4	4	5	7	5	6	5	5	3	3	3	3	3	3	3	3
Ratchaburi	9	12	4	9	9	11	10	11	8	4	7	8	10	9	10	8	7	5	6	7	7	7	5	4	4	5	4	4	4	4
Port	3	2	2	2	2	2	2	2	2	2	3	3	3	3	3	3	3	3	3	3	4	4	6	5	5	4	5	6	5	5
Muangthong United	10	7	6	5	6	3	5	7	9	7	9	10	8	6	8	7	4	6	4	4	3	3	4	6	6	7	6	7	7	6
PT Prachuap	11	4	10	6	7	5	6	9	10	8	5	5	5	4	5	5	6	8	7	5	6	6	7	7	7	6	7	5	6	7
Lamphun Warriors	8	8	7	8	10	9	11	8	11	11	11	12	12	12	11	12	10	10	11	12	11	10	8	8	9	10	8	9	9	8
Uthai Thani	12	13	15	13	8	8	8	6	4	6	8	6	7	10	9	10	11	14	10	9	8	9	10	9	8	8	9	8	8	9
Sukhothai	14	14	5	10	13	13	12	10	6	9	6	7	6	7	6	6	8	4	8	8	9	8	9	10	11	9	10	11	11	10
Chiangrai United	4	11	13	15	14	14	15	15	13	14	15	14	14	14	14	14	14	13	14	11	12	12	12	12	13	12	11	10	10	11
Rayong	13	10	9	11	11	12	13	13	14	13	13	13	13	13	12	13	13	12	12	14	13	14	14	14	12	14	14	13	12	12
Nakhon Ratchasima	7	3	3	3	5	7	7	5	7	10	10	11	9	8	7	9	9	9	9	10	10	11	11	11	10	11	12	12	13	13
Nongbua Pitchaya	16	16	14	12	12	10	9	12	12	12	12	9	11	11	13	11	12	11	13	13	14	13	13	13	14	13	13	14	14	14
Nakhon Pathom United	5	6	11	14	15	15	14	14	15	16	16	16	16	16	16	15	15	15	15	15	15	15	15	15	15	15	15	15	15	15
Khonkaen United	15	15	16	16	16	16	16	16	16	15	14	15	15	15	15	16	16	16	16	16	16	16	16	16	16	16	16	16	16	16

Leader and qualification to the 2025–26 AFC Champions League Elite league stage
Qualification to the 2025–26 AFC Champions League Elite qualifiers
Qualification to the 2025–26 AFC Champions League Two
Relegation to the 2025–26 Thai League 2

Source: Thai League

=== Results by match played ===
Team ╲ Round	1	2	3	4	5	6	7	8	9	10	11	12	13	14	15	16	17	18	19	20	21	22	23	24	25	26	27	28	29	30
Bangkok United	W	L	D	W	W	D	W	D	W	W	W	W	W	L	L	W	W	D	W	W	D	W	W	W	D	W	W	W	W	W
BG Pathum United	W	L	L	W	W	D	W	D	D	W	D	W	L	W	L	D	L	L	W	D	W	W	W	W	W	D	W	W	L	D
Buriram United	W	W	W	W	W	D	W	W	D	D	W	W	W	W	W	L	W	W	W	W	L	W	D	W	W	W	W	L	L	W
Chiangrai United	W	L	L	L	D	L	W	L	L	L	L	W	D	L	W	W	L	W	L	W	L	W	L	L	L	W	W	W	D	L
Khonkaen United	L	D	L	L	L	L	D	D	L	W	D	L	L	L	L	L	W	L	L	L	L	D	D	L	L	L	W	L	L	W
Lamphun Warriors	W	L	D	D	L	W	L	W	L	L	D	D	D	W	L	L	W	D	L	D	W	W	W	D	L	L	W	L	D	D
Muangthong United	L	W	D	W	D	W	D	D	D	L	W	W	L	L	W	W	L	W	W	W	L	L	L	L	W	L	L	W	D	W
Nakhon Pathom United	W	L	L	L	L	D	L	L	D	L	L	L	D	L	W	W	D	D	L	L	W	D	L	L	W	L	L	L	D	L
Nakhon Ratchasima	W	W	D	D	D	D	L	W	L	L	D	W	W	D	L	L	L	W	D	L	D	D	D	L	W	L	L	L	D	L
Nongbua Pitchaya	L	L	W	D	D	D	W	L	L	L	W	W	L	L	L	W	D	D	L	D	L	D	L	D	L	W	D	L	L	L
Port	W	W	W	W	D	D	L	D	W	W	D	L	D	W	W	L	L	L	D	W	L	W	W	D	L	D	L	W	W	W
PT Prachuap	L	W	L	W	D	W	L	D	D	D	W	W	W	D	D	L	D	L	W	L	W	L	W	L	W	L	W	W	D	L
Rayong	L	W	D	L	D	L	L	L	L	W	L	W	D	D	W	D	L	W	D	L	D	L	L	D	W	L	L	W	W	L
Ratchaburi	L	D	W	L	D	L	W	D	W	W	L	D	L	W	L	W	W	W	D	D	D	W	W	W	L	W	L	W	W	W
Sukhothai	L	D	W	L	L	L	W	W	W	L	W	D	W	L	D	W	D	W	L	L	L	D	D	L	L	W	D	L	D	D
Uthai Thani	L	D	D	D	W	W	L	W	W	L	L	W	L	D	L	L	L	W	W	W	L	D	D	W	L	D	D	L	D	D

Source: Thai League
W = Win; D = Draw; L = Lose

== Results ==
Home \ Away	BKU	BGP	BRU	CRU	KKU	LWR	MTU	NPU	NRM	NON	POR	PTP	RAY	RBM	SUK	UTT
Bangkok United	—	3–0	3–2	3–2	5–0	3–2	2–1	1–1	2–1	1–0	2–0	2–1	2–2	0–0	4–1	0–0
BG Pathum United	1–0	—	0–2	2–0	4–1	1–0	2–0	3–1	1–0	1–1	1–0	1–0	0–1	1–2	4–4	2–1
Buriram United	4–2	1–2	—	8–0	9–0	1–1	1–0	3–0	5–0	7–0	0–1	6–0	2–1	6–0	2–0	1–0
Chiangrai United	1–2	1–0	0–5	—	2–0	2–0	3–1	3–0	0–2	2–1	1–0	1–1	1–0	0–1	0–0	1–0
Khonkaen United	2–3	0–3	0–3	3–1	—	0–0	2–1	0–0	0–0	0–1	1–2	1–4	0–1	4–7	1–1	0–1
Lamphun Warriors	0–1	2–2	1–2	1–0	0–1	—	1–5	1–1	3–0	3–3	3–2	0–0	4–1	1–0	1–0	1–0
Muangthong United	2–1	1–1	1–3	2–1	0–0	1–0	—	3–1	2–0	2–1	1–2	0–2	4–0	2–0	4–2	2–0
Nakhon Pathom United	0–3	1–4	1–3	2–1	2–1	0–3	2–4	—	1–2	1–1	1–2	1–1	1–2	1–6	0–1	0–1
Nakhon Ratchasima	1–1	1–0	1–5	1–4	3–1	1–1	2–1	0–3	—	2–1	2–3	1–1	3–3	1–1	2–2	3–2
Nongbua Pitchaya	2–3	1–1	0–4	0–2	6–1	0–0	0–0	2–1	1–1	—	1–2	1–0	1–1	5–3	1–1	3–2
Port	0–0	1–2	0–0	5–1	1–2	2–1	1–1	2–0	4–2	2–1	—	0–2	4–1	3–3	4–1	1–1
PT Prachuap	2–4	2–2	1–2	2–0	1–0	2–1	5–0	1–0	2–2	4–0	0–0	—	3–0	3–2	1–1	3–0
Rayong	0–3	1–1	1–1	2–0	4–0	2–3	1–1	2–2	1–1	3–1	1–3	3–2	—	1–4	2–1	2–3
Ratchaburi	1–2	4–1	3–2	1–0	2–0	1–1	1–0	2–3	4–0	4–0	2–2	3–2	2–0	—	2–2	1–1
Sukhothai	1–3	1–3	1–2	3–3	1–0	4–0	1–3	0–0	1–0	5–2	3–2	2–0	3–1	2–1	—	2–3
Uthai Thani	0–2	1–1	0–0	3–0	0–0	1–1	1–1	2–1	1–1	3–0	1–1	3–1	3–1	1–2	3–0	—

Source: Thai League
Legend: Blue = home team win; Yellow = draw; Red = away team win.

== Season statistics ==
=== Top scorers ===
As of 30 April 2025.

Rank	Player	Club(s)	Goals
1	(Brazil) Guilherme Bissoli	Buriram United	25
2	(Brazil) Chrigor	Buriram United (7 Goals); PT Prachuap (10 Goals)	17
3	(Oman) Muhsen Al-Ghassani	Bangkok United	15
4	(Brazil) Matheus Fornazari	Sukhothai	13
5	(Palestine) Mahmoud Eid	Bangkok United	12
6	(Brazil) Raniel	BG Pathum United	11
6	(France) Clément Depres	Ratchaburi	11
6	(Madagascar) John Baggio	Sukhothai	11
9	(Thailand) Supachai Chaided	Buriram United	10
9	(Thailand) Teerasak Poeiphimai	Port	10
9	(Brazil) Stênio Júnior	Rayong	10
9	(Madagascar) Njiva Rakotoharimalala	Ratchaburi	10

=== Hat-tricks ===
Player	For	Against	Result	Date
(Canada) Marcus Haber	Nongbua Pitchaya	Uthai Thani	3–2 (H)	21 September 2024
(Brazil) Guilherme Bissoli^{4}	Buriram United	Ratchaburi	6–0 (H)	8 December 2024
(Sweden) Emil Roback	Muangthong United	Lamphun Warriors	5–1 (A)	11 January 2025
(Italy) Martin Boakye	Buriram United	Khonkaen United	9–0 (H)	19 January 2025
(Thailand) Suphanat Mueanta	Buriram United	Khonkaen United	9–0 (H)	19 January 2025
(Brazil) Stênio Júnior	Rayong	Nakhon Ratchasima	3–3 (A)	25 January 2025
(Madagascar) Njiva Rakotoharimalala	Ratchaburi	Khonkaen United	7–4 (A)	6 April 2025
(Brazil) Matheus Fornazari	Sukhothai	BG Pathum United	4–4 (A)	27 April 2025

=== Clean sheets ===
As of 30 April 2025.

Rank	Player	Club	Clean sheets
1	(Philippines) Neil Etheridge	Buriram United	16
2	(Thailand) Patiwat Khammai	Bangkok United	10
3	(Thailand) Apirak Worawong	Chiangrai United	9
4	(Thailand) Kampol Pathomakkakul	Ratchaburi	8
5	(Thailand) Kittipun Saensuk	Sukhothai	7
6	(Thailand) Kittipong Phuthawchueak	Muangthong United	6
6	(Thailand) Boonyakait Wongsajaem	Uthai Thani	6
8	(Thailand) Chirawat Wangthaphan	Khonkaen United	5
8	(Thailand) Korraphat Nareechan	Lamphun Warriors	5
8	(Thailand) Wattanachai Srathongjan	Nakhon Pathom United	5
8	(Thailand) Rattanai Songsangchan	PT Prachuap	5

== Awards ==
=== Monthly awards ===
Month	Coach of the Month		Player of the Month		Goal of the month		Reference
Month	Coach	Club	Player	Club	Player	Club	Reference
August	(Brazil) Osmar Loss	Buriram United	(Brazil) Guilherme Bissoli	Buriram United			
September	(Thailand) Aktaporn Chalitaporn	Sukhothai	(Madagascar) John Baggio	Sukhothai	(Thailand) Ben Davis	Uthai Thani	
October	(Thailand) Totchtawan Sripan	Bangkok United	(Thailand) Phanthamit Praphanth	PT Prachuap	(Thailand) Pokklaw Anan	Bangkok United	
November							
December							
January	(Thailand) Worrawoot Srimaka	Ratchaburi	(Thailand) Suphanat Mueanta	Buriram United	(Thailand) Sunchai Chaolaokhwan	Nakhonpathom United	
February	(Brazil) Alexandre Gama	Lamphun warrior	(Thailand) Anan Yodsangwal	Lamphun warrior	(Thailand) Anan Yodsangwal	Lamphun warrior	
March	(Thailand) Totchtawan Sripan	Bangkok United					
April	(Thailand) Totchtawan Sripan	Bangkok United	(Madagascar) Njiva Rakotoharimalala	Ratchaburi	(Thailand) Ben Davis	Bangkok United	

== Attendances ==
=== Overall statistical table ===
Pos	Team	Total	High	Low	Average	Change
1	Buriram United	275,441	31,305	10,168	18,363	−11.2%
2	BG Pathum United	122,978	11,469	6,704	8,199	+0.7%
3	Nakhon Ratchasima	116,577	15,320	5,022	7,772	+37.3%^{†}
4	Muangthong United	67,325	10,323	2,350	4,488	−8.0%
5	Port	66,444	6,250	2,317	4,430	−1.8%
6	Ratchaburi	58,724	9,458	2,179	3,915	+17.2%
7	Chiangrai United	54,668	6,193	2,417	3,645	−9.7%
8	Khonkaen United	53,791	6,237	2,246	3,586	−22.0%
9	Rayong	53,142	7,500	1,665	3,543	+238.1%^{†}
10	PT Prachuap	51,528	4,880	2,789	3,435	+15.3%
11	Uthai Thani	48,075	5,015	2,224	3,205	+9.7%
12	Lamphun Warriors	46,366	5,179	1,605	3,091	+6.5%
13	Nongbua Pitchaya	41,951	5,955	1,169	2,797	+65.9%^{†}
14	Sukhothai	35,583	6,095	1,507	2,372	+8.4%
15	Bangkok United	35,054	7,093	1,201	2,337	−16.0%
16	Nakhon Pathom United	30,409	4,890	1,132	2,027	−24.0%
	League total	1,158,056	31,305	1,132	4,825	+2.7%

Updated to games played on 30 April 2025
Source: Thai League
Notes:
^{†} Teams played previous season in Thai League 2

=== Attendances by home match played ===
Team \ Match played	1	2	3	4	5	6	7	8	9	10	11	12	13	14	15	Total
Bangkok United	2,004	2,181	2,051	1,433	1,676	3,843	7,093	1,377	1,299	1,201	1,251	1,320	1,218	3,031	4,076	35,054
BG Pathum United	7,870	6,704	7,212	7,045	7,793	10,180	11,469	6,765	6,807	10,425	6,904	10,366	6,729	8,244	8,465	122,978
Buriram United	25,093	16,644	15,282	16,107	21,059	15,214	15,654	21,220	15,577	15,394	31,305	10,168	10,438	15,111	31,175	275,441
Chiangrai United	2,886	6,193	3,180	2,819	3,972	2,417	3,090	3,644	3,750	4,340	3,063	3,473	3,725	4,350	3,766	54,668
Khonkaen United	4,347	4,813	6,167	6,237	2,246	3,847	4,226	3,972	2,874	2,637	2,412	2,479	2,561	2,450	2,523	53,791
Lamphun Warriors	5,179	4,097	2,542	2,155	1,605	3,510	3,843	3,113	1,876	3,050	2,750	2,778	4,581	3,236	2,051	46,366
Muangthong United	4,711	3,145	3,417	2,526	8,209	3,013	2,350	5,173	3,044	3,312	3,522	10,323	6,718	2,739	5,123	67,325
Nakhon Pathom United	3,989	2,329	1,424	2,246	1,650	2,150	1,521	4,890	1,429	1,996	1,429	1,529	1,424	1,132	1,271	30,409
Nakhon Ratchasima	10,021	10,010	10,211	7,820	8,132	10,121	15,320	6,030	5,832	5,842	5,221	5,142	5,741	5,022	6,112	116,577
Nongbua Pitchaya	5,955	2,191	4,375	2,015	3,710	1,169	2,505	2,748	1,355	1,224	5,293	2,061	2,602	1,424	3,324	41,951
Port	6,250	4,076	6,250	6,250	4,104	6,250	3,350	3,847	2,317	3,538	3,645	5,906	3,901	2,745	4,015	66,444
PT Prachuap	2,850	2,970	3,117	3,471	3,568	3,317	3,108	3,711	2,789	3,112	4,880	3,378	3,478	3,109	4,670	51,528
Ratchaburi	4,430	3,327	4,675	4,729	3,471	3,278	2,917	2,577	2,179	4,375	3,479	3,745	2,843	3,241	9,458	58,724
Rayong	6,250	7,250	3,513	2,382	2,370	1,850	7,500	1,699	4,586	1,671	2,514	1,665	3,183	1,834	4,875	53,142
Sukhothai	5,037	1,761	2,009	1,507	1,767	1,647	1,723	1,781	2,321	3,180	1,583	2,045	1,554	6,095	1,573	35,583
Uthai Thani	2,611	3,459	2,647	2,727	4,144	3,154	3,009	2,630	2,420	2,224	5,015	2,390	4,525	3,130	3,990	48,075

Source: Thai League

== See also ==
- 2024–25 Thai League 2
- 2024–25 Thai League 3
- 2024 Thailand Semi-pro League
- 2025 Thailand Amateur League
- 2024–25 Thai FA Cup
- 2024–25 Thai League Cup
- 2024 Thailand Champions Cup
