= 2025 Thai League Charity Match =

Thai League Charity Match
- Event: Thai League Charity Match
| Uthai Thani | Chonburi |
| 1 | 1 |
- Date: 9 August 2025
- Venue: True BG Stadium, Pathum Thani
- Man of the Match: Nattanan Biesamrit
- Referee: Alongkorn Khonwai (Thailand)
- Attendance: 4,581
- Weather: Fair; 31 °C (88 °F) humidity 64%

The 2025 Thai League Charity Match (Thai: ไทยลีก แชริตี้ แมตช์) was the inaugural edition of the fixture, introduced by the Football Association of Thailand (FA Thailand) as a new curtain-raiser for the domestic football season. Unlike its predecessors, the Kor Royal Cup and the Thailand Champions Cup, the Charity Match was established as an entirely new competition rather than a continuation or rebranding of earlier events. The match was played on 9 August 2025, contested between Uthai Thani, who had finished ninth in the 2024–25 Thai League 1, and Chonburi, the 2024–25 Thai League 2 champions, at the True BG Stadium in Thanyaburi, Pathum Thani. The match was organized as a charity event with no trophy awarded, and proceeds from the game were donated to the FA Thailand. It has a live broadcast on AIS Play.

== Background ==
Thai football has traditionally featured a season-opening fixture, although it has been presented under different formats and titles over the years. The Kor Royal Cup served as the curtain-raiser for decades until its last edition in 2016. The role was then taken over by the Thailand Champions Cup, held from 2017 until 2023. Both competitions were subsequently discontinued.

In 2025, the FA Thailand launched the Thai League Charity Match as a new event with its concept. The fixture was designed as a one-off charity game, with proceeds donated to the FA Thailand, and no official trophy was contested. Unlike the Champions Cup, which specifically pitted the Thai League 1 champions against the Thai FA Cup winners, the Charity Match adopted a more flexible approach in determining its participants.

For the inaugural edition, fixture congestion and continental commitments led the reigning Thai League 1 and Thai FA Cup champions to decline participation. Therefore, the FA Thailand selected Chonburi, the 2024–25 Thai League 2 champions, and Uthai Thani, who had finished ninth in 2024–25 Thai League 1, to play in the match.

== Invited Teams ==
| Team | Invitation type | Participation |
|---|---|---|
| Uthai Thani | Top 10 of 2024–25 Thai League 1 | 1st |
| Chonburi | 2024–25 Thai League 2 champions | 1st |

== Match ==
=== Details ===
9 August 2025
18:00 UTC+7
Charity Match

| Uthai Thani | 1–1 | Chonburi |
|---|---|---|
| Mohamed Eisa 49' | Highlight | Nattanan Biesamrit 75' |

True BG Stadium,
Thanyaburi, Pathum Thani
Attendance: 4,581
Referee: Alongkorn Khonwai (Thailand)

| Uthai Thani | Chonburi |

Lineups:
| GK | 26 | (Thailand) Chirawat Wangthaphan |
| RB | 27 | (Thailand) James Beresford | | | (substituted off) 67' |
| CB | 19 | (Thailand) Wattana Playnum (c) | | | (substituted off) 46' |
| CB | 5 | (Guinea-Bissau) Marcelo Djaló | | | (substituted off) 72' |
| LB | 3 | (Thailand) Charalampos Charalampous |
| CM | 21 | (Thailand) Sirimongkol Rattanapoom | | (yellow card) 30' |
| CM | 10 | (Thailand) Ben Davis | | (yellow card) 45+2' |
| AM | 78 | (France) Christian Gomis |
| RF | 20 | (Thailand) Nontapat Naksawat | | | (substituted off) 56' |
| CF | 7 | (Sudan) Mohamed Eisa | 49' |
| LF | 9 | (Nigeria) Chigozie Mbah | | | (substituted off) 46' |
Substitutes:
| GK | 24 | (Thailand) Worawut Sukhuna |
| DF | 2 | (Switzerland) Martin Angha |
| DF | 6 | (Myanmar) Soe Moe Kyaw | | | (substituted in) 46' |
| DF | 17 | (Thailand) Jakkit Wachpirom | | | (substituted in) 72' |
| DF | 89 | (Thailand) Thitawee Aksornsri |
| MF | 29 | (Thailand) Leon James | | | (substituted in) 67' |
| MF | 71 | (Thailand) Kristoffer Wisarut Ryberg |
| MF | 90 | (Thailand) Piyaphong Phrueksupee |
| FW | 14 | (Thailand) Amornthep Maundee | | | (substituted in) 46' |
| FW | 72 | (Brazil) Bruno Baio | | | (substituted in) 56' |
| FW | 99 | (Thailand) Siam Yapp |
Head Coach:
(Italy) Gino Lettieri

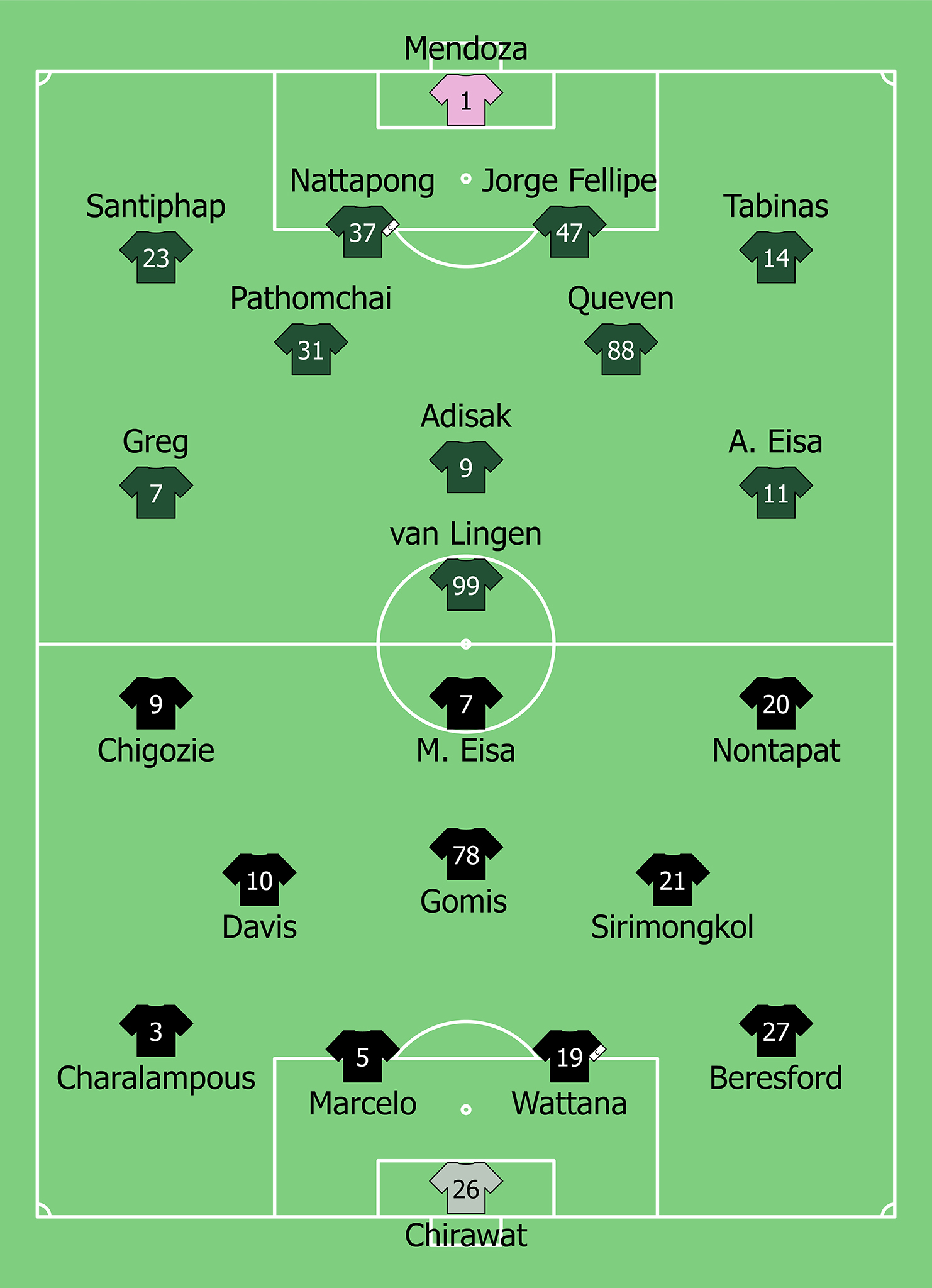

Lineups:
| GK | 1 | (Philippines) Kevin Ray Mendoza | | (substituted off) 81' |
| RB | 23 | (Thailand) Santiphap Channgom | | (substituted off) 81' |
| CB | 37 | (Thailand) Nattapong Sayriya (c) | | (substituted off) 81' |
| CB | 47 | (Brazil) Jorge Fellipe | | (substituted off) 81' |
| LB | 14 | (Philippines) Jefferson Tabinas | | (substituted off) 81' |
| DM | 31 | (Thailand) Pathomchai Sueasakul | | (substituted off) 61' |
| DM | 88 | (Brazil) Queven | | (substituted off) 81' |
| RM | 7 | (France) Greg Houla | | (substituted off) 81' |
| AM | 9 | (Thailand) Adisak Kraisorn | | (substituted off) 81' |
| LM | 11 | (Sudan) Abo Eisa | | (substituted off) 81' |
| CF | 99 | (Netherlands) Oege-Sietse van Lingen | | (substituted off) 58' |
Substitutes:
| GK | 46 | (Thailand) Noppakun Kadtoon | | (substituted in) 81' |
| DF | 2 | (Philippines) Kike Linares | | (substituted in) 81' |
| DF | 4 | (Thailand) Kittipong Sansanit | | (substituted in) 81' |
| DF | 6 | (Thailand) Songchai Thongcham | | (substituted in) 81' |
| DF | 36 | (Thailand) Thanaset Sujarit | | (substituted in) 81' |
| MF | 13 | (Ghana) Leslie Adjei Ablorh | | (substituted in) 58' |
| MF | 20 | (Thailand) Suksan Bunta | | (substituted in) 81' |
| MF | 30 | (Thailand) Nattanan Biesamrit | 75' | (substituted in) 61' |
| MF | 32 | (Thailand) Rachata Moraksa | | (substituted in) 81' |
| MF | 80 | (Thailand) Chayathorn Tapsuvanavon | | (substituted in) 81' |
| FW | 21 | (Thailand) Siraphop Wandee | | (substituted in) 81' |
| FW | 92 | (Thailand) Tontawan Puntamunee |
Head Coach:
(Thailand) Teerasak Po-on

Assistant referees:
(Thailand) Komsan Kampan
(Thailand) Tanate Chuchuen
Fourth official:
(Thailand) Kitisak Pikunngoen

MATCH RULES

- 90 minutes.
- A maximum of twelve substitutions in three substitutes.

== See also ==
- 2025–26 Thai League 1
- 2025–26 Thai League 2
- 2025–26 Thai League 3
- 2025–26 Thai League 3 Northern Region
- 2025–26 Thai League 3 Central Region
- 2025–26 Thai League 3 Northeastern Region
- 2025–26 Thai League 3 Eastern Region
- 2025–26 Thai League 3 Western Region
- 2025–26 Thai League 3 Southern Region
- 2025–26 Thai League 3 National Championship
- 2025 Thai U21 League
- 2025–26 Thai FA Cup
- 2025–26 Thai League Cup
- 2025–26 Thai League 3 Cup
