= Football at the 2016 Summer Olympics – Men's tournament – Group B =

Group B of the men's football tournament at the 2016 Summer Olympics was played from 4 to 10 August 2016, and included Colombia, Japan, Nigeria and Sweden. The top two teams advanced to the knockout stage.

All times are BRT (UTC−3). For matches in Manaus, which is in AMT (UTC−4), local times are listed in parentheses.

== Teams ==
Draw position	Team	Confederation	Method of qualification	Date of qualification	Olympic appearance	Last appearance	Previous best performance
B1	Sweden	UEFA	UEFA Under-21 Championship 1st place	24 June 2015	10th	1992	Gold medal (1948)
B2	Colombia	CONMEBOL	CONCACAF–CONMEBOL play-off winners	29 March 2016	5th	1992	Group stage (1968, 1972, 1980, 1992)
B3	Nigeria	CAF	Africa U-23 Cup of Nations 1st place	9 December 2015	7th	2008	Gold medal (1996)
B4	Japan	AFC	AFC U-23 Championship 1st place	26 January 2016	10th	2012	Bronze medal (1968)

== Standings ==
Pos	Team	Pld	W	D	L	GF	GA	GD	Pts	Qualification
1	Nigeria	3	2	0	1	6	6	0	6	Quarter-finals
2	Colombia	3	1	2	0	6	4	+2	5	Quarter-finals
3	Japan	3	1	1	1	7	7	0	4	
4	Sweden	3	0	1	2	2	4	−2	1	

Source: Rio2016 & FIFA
Rules for classification: Tiebreakers

== Matches ==
=== Sweden vs Colombia ===
4 August 2016
19:00 (18:00 UTC–4)

Sweden	2–2	Colombia
Ishak 43'; Ajdarević 62'	Report (Rio2016); Report (FIFA)	Gutiérrez 17'; Pabón 75' (pen.)

Arena da Amazônia, Manaus
Attendance: 29,996
Referee: Fahad Al-Mirdasi (Saudi Arabia)

Sweden	Colombia

GK	1	Andreas Linde
DF	2	Adam Lundqvist
DF	3	Alexander Milošević
DF	4	Joakim Nilsson
DF	5	Pa Konate
MF	6	Abdul Khalili
MF	7	Simon Tibbling
MF	8	Alexander Fransson
MF	9	Robin Quaison	(substituted off) 78'
MF	11	Astrit Ajdarević (c)	(substituted off) 90+1'
FW	12	Mikael Ishak	(substituted off) 86'
Substitutions:
MF	17	Ken Sema	(substituted on) 78'
MF	10	Muamer Tanković	(substituted on) 86'
FW	21	Valmir Berisha	(substituted on) 90+1'
Manager:
Håkan Ericson

GK	1	Cristian Bonilla
DF	2	William Tesillo
DF	3	Deivy Balanta	(yellow card) 48'
DF	4	Deiver Machado
DF	13	Helibelton Palacios	(yellow card) 50'
MF	12	Andrés Felipe Roa		(substituted off) 65'
MF	14	Sebastián Pérez	(yellow card) 83'
MF	15	Wílmar Barrios
FW	8	Dorlan Pabón
FW	9	Miguel Borja		(substituted off) 65'
FW	10	Teófilo Gutiérrez (c)
Substitutions:
FW	11	Harold Preciado		(substituted on) 65'
MF	16	Kevin Balanta		(substituted on) 65'
Manager:
Carlos Restrepo

Assistant referees:
Abdullah Al-Shalwai (Saudi Arabia)
Mohammed Al-Abakry (Saudi Arabia)
Fourth official:
Joseph Lamptey (Ghana)

=== Nigeria vs Japan ===
4 August 2016
22:00 (21:00 UTC–4)

Nigeria	5–4	Japan
Sadiq 6'; Etebo 10', 42', 52' (pen.), 66'	Report (Rio2016); Report (FIFA)	Koroki 9' (pen.); Minamino 12'; Asano 70'; Suzuki 90+5'

Arena da Amazônia, Manaus
Attendance: 29,996
Referee: Clément Turpin (France)

Nigeria	Japan

GK	12	Daniel Akpeyi
RB	4	Shehu Abdullahi
CB	6	William Troost-Ekong
CB	16	Stanley Amuzie	(yellow card) 7'
LB	14	Azubuike Okechukwu
DM	10	Mikel John Obi (c)		(substituted off) 87'
RM	2	Seth Sincere
CM	8	Peter Etebo
CM	17	Muhammed Usman Edu		(substituted off) 73'
LM	13	Umar Sadiq
CF	9	Imoh Ezekiel		(substituted off) 78'
Substitutions:
DF	3	Kingsley Madu		(substituted on) 73'
DF	15	Ndifreke Udo		(substituted on) 78'
MF	12	Saliu Popoola		(substituted on) 87'
Manager:
Samson Siasia

GK	1	Masatoshi Kushibiki
RB	2	Sei Muroya
CB	6	Tsukasa Shiotani
CB	5	Naomichi Ueda
LB	4	Hiroki Fujiharu
DM	3	Wataru Endo
CM	8	Ryota Oshima
CM	7	Riki Harakawa (c)	(substituted off) 53'
RF	18	Takumi Minamino
CF	13	Shinzo Koroki	(substituted off) 71'
LF	10	Shoya Nakajima	(substituted off) 76'
Substitutions:
FW	16	Takuma Asano	(substituted on) 53'
FW	11	Musashi Suzuki	(substituted on) 71'
MF	9	Shinya Yajima	(substituted on) 76'
Manager:
Makoto Teguramori

Assistant referees:
Frédéric Cano (France)
Nicolas Danos (France)
Fourth official:
Diego Haro (Peru)

=== Sweden vs Nigeria ===
7 August 2016
19:00 (18:00 UTC–4)

Sweden	0–1	Nigeria
	Report (Rio2016); Report (FIFA)	Sadiq 40'

Arena da Amazônia, Manaus
Attendance: 23,892
Referee: Matthew Conger (New Zealand)

Sweden	Nigeria

GK	1	Andreas Linde
DF	2	Adam Lundqvist	(yellow card) 60'	(substituted off) 81'
DF	3	Alexander Milošević
DF	4	Joakim Nilsson
DF	5	Pa Konate
MF	6	Abdul Khalili
MF	7	Simon Tibbling
MF	8	Alexander Fransson		(substituted off) 62'
MF	9	Robin Quaison		(substituted off) 69'
MF	11	Astrit Ajdarević (c)
FW	12	Mikael Ishak
Substitutions:
MF	17	Ken Sema	(yellow card) 79'	(substituted on) 62'
MF	10	Muamer Tanković		(substituted on) 69'
DF	13	Jacob Une Larsson		(substituted on) 81'
Manager:
Håkan Ericson

GK	18	Emmanuel Daniel
RB	4	Shehu Abdullahi		(substituted off) 88'
CB	6	William Troost-Ekong
CB	16	Stanley Amuzie
LB	14	Azubuike Okechukwu
DM	10	Mikel John Obi (c)		(substituted off) 80'
RM	2	Seth Sincere
CM	8	Peter Etebo
CM	17	Muhammed Usman Edu
LM	13	Umar Sadiq		(substituted off) 74'
CF	9	Imoh Ezekiel
Substitutions:
FW	7	Aminu Umar	(yellow card) 79'	(substituted on) 74'
DF	3	Kingsley Madu		(substituted on) 80'
DF	15	Ndifreke Udo		(substituted on) 88'
Manager:
Samson Siasia

Assistant referees:
Simon Lount (New Zealand)
Tevita Makasini (Tonga)
Fourth official:
Diego Haro (Peru)

=== Japan vs Colombia ===
7 August 2016
22:00 (21:00 UTC–4)

Japan	2–2	Colombia
Asano 67'; Nakajima 74'	Report (Rio2016); Report (FIFA)	Gutiérrez 59'; Fujiharu 65' (o.g.)

Arena da Amazônia, Manaus
Attendance: 26,603
Referee: Sergei Karasev (Russia)

Japan	Colombia

GK	12	Kosuke Nakamura
RB	2	Sei Muroya	(yellow card) 39'
CB	6	Tsukasa Shiotani
CB	5	Naomichi Ueda
LB	4	Hiroki Fujiharu	(yellow card) 53'	(substituted off) 80'
DM	3	Wataru Endo (c)	(yellow card) 31'
RM	9	Shinya Yajima		(substituted off) 62'
CM	14	Yosuke Ideguchi	(yellow card) 22'	(substituted off) 62'
LM	10	Shoya Nakajima
SS	16	Takuma Asano
CF	13	Shinzo Koroki
Substitutions:
MF	8	Ryota Oshima		(substituted on) 62'
MF	18	Takumi Minamino		(substituted on) 62'
DF	15	Masashi Kamekawa		(substituted on) 80'
Manager:
Makoto Teguramori

GK	1	Cristian Bonilla
DF	2	William Tesillo	(yellow card) 23'
DF	3	Deivy Balanta
DF	4	Deiver Machado
DF	5	Felipe Aguilar		(substituted off) 46'
MF	14	Sebastián Pérez		(substituted off) 46'
MF	15	Wílmar Barrios
MF	16	Kevin Balanta	(yellow card) 76'	(substituted off) 77'
FW	8	Dorlan Pabón
FW	9	Miguel Borja
FW	10	Teófilo Gutiérrez (c)
Substitutions:
FW	7	Arley Rodríguez		(substituted on) 46'
DF	13	Helibelton Palacios		(substituted on) 46'
MF	6	Jefferson Lerma		(substituted on) 77'
Manager:
Carlos Restrepo

Assistant referees:
Tikhon Kalugin (Russia)
Nikolay Golubev (Russia)
Fourth official:
Joseph Lamptey (Ghana)

=== Japan vs Sweden ===
10 August 2016
19:00

Japan	1–0	Sweden
Yajima 65'	Report (Rio2016); Report (FIFA)

Itaipava Arena Fonte Nova, Salvador
Attendance: 17,821
Referee: Malang Diedhiou (Senegal)

Japan	Sweden

GK	12	Kosuke Nakamura
RB	2	Sei Muroya
CB	6	Tsukasa Shiotani
CB	5	Naomichi Ueda
LB	15	Masashi Kamekawa
CM	3	Wataru Endo (c)
CM	8	Ryota Oshima
RM	18	Takumi Minamino	(substituted off) 57'
LM	10	Shoya Nakajima
CF	13	Shinzo Koroki	(substituted off) 77'
CF	16	Takuma Asano	(substituted off) 61'
Substitutions:
MF	9	Shinya Yajima	(substituted on) 57'
FW	11	Musashi Suzuki	(substituted on) 61'
MF	14	Yosuke Ideguchi	(substituted on) 77'
Manager:
Makoto Teguramori

GK	1	Andreas Linde
DF	2	Adam Lundqvist
DF	3	Alexander Milošević	(yellow card) 26'
DF	5	Pa Konate
DF	13	Jacob Une Larsson
MF	6	Abdul Khalili
MF	7	Simon Tibbling
MF	8	Alexander Fransson		(substituted off) 46'
MF	9	Robin Quaison		(substituted off) 72'
MF	11	Astrit Ajdarević (c)
FW	12	Mikael Ishak		(substituted off) 83'
Substitutions:
MF	10	Muamer Tanković		(substituted on) 46'
MF	17	Ken Sema		(substituted on) 72'
FW	21	Valmir Berisha		(substituted on) 83'
Manager:
Håkan Ericson

Assistant referees:
Djibril Camara (Senegal)
El Hadji Malick Samba (Senegal)
Fourth official:
Gehad Grisha (Egypt)

=== Colombia vs Nigeria ===
10 August 2016
19:00

Colombia	2–0	Nigeria
Gutiérrez 4'; Pabón 63' (pen.)	Report (Rio2016); Report (FIFA)

Arena Corinthians, São Paulo
Attendance: 36,702
Referee: César Ramos (Mexico)

Colombia	Nigeria

GK	1	Cristian Bonilla
DF	2	William Tesillo
DF	3	Deivy Balanta
DF	13	Helibelton Palacios
DF	17	Cristian Borja
MF	12	Andrés Felipe Roa
MF	15	Wílmar Barrios		(substituted off) 78'
MF	16	Kevin Balanta	(yellow card) 70'	(substituted off) 72'
FW	8	Dorlan Pabón		(substituted off) 86'
FW	10	Teófilo Gutiérrez (c)
FW	11	Harold Preciado
Substitutions:
MF	6	Jefferson Lerma		(substituted on) 72'
MF	14	Sebastián Pérez		(substituted on) 78'
DF	4	Deiver Machado		(substituted on) 86'
Manager:
Carlos Restrepo

GK	1	Daniel Akpeyi	(yellow card) 62'
RB	2	Seth Sincere
CB	6	William Troost-Ekong	(yellow card) 43'
CB	14	Azubuike Okechukwu	(yellow card) 52'
LB	3	Kingsley Madu		(substituted off) 80'
CM	10	Mikel John Obi (c)
CM	8	Peter Etebo
RW	15	Ndifreke Udo
AM	12	Saliu Popoola		(substituted off) 70'
LW	7	Aminu Umar		(substituted off) 70'
CF	13	Umar Sadiq
Substitutions:
FW	9	Imoh Ezekiel		(substituted on) 70'
MF	17	Muhammed Usman Edu		(substituted on) 70'
DF	16	Stanley Amuzie		(substituted on) 80'
Manager:
Samson Siasia

Assistant referees:
Marvin Torrentera (Mexico)
Miguel Hernández (Mexico)
Fourth official:
Walter López Castellanos (Guatemala)
