= 2023–24 Thai League 1 =

Season of association football league

Thai League 1
- Season: 2023–24
- Dates: 11 August 2023 – 26 May 2024
- Champions: Buriram United; 10th Thai League 1 title
- Relegated: Chonburi; Police Tero; Trat
- 2024–25 ACL Elite: Buriram United; Bangkok United
- 2024–25 ACL Two: Port; Muangthong United
- Matches: 240
- Goals: 736 (3.07 per match)
- Top goalscorer: Supachai Chaided (21 goals)
- Biggest home win: 6 goals difference BG Pathum United 7–1 Sukhothai (9 March 2024); Bangkok United 6–0 Chonburi (31 March 2024)Muangthong United 6–0 Chonburi (18 May 2024); Buriram United 8–2 Khonkaen United (26 May 2024)
- Biggest away win: 4 goals difference Uthai Thani 1–5 Port (6 October 2023); Police Tero 0–4 Port (11 February 2024)
- Highest scoring: 10 goals total Buriram United 8–2 Khonkaen United (26 May 2024)
- Longest winning run: 8 matches Buriram United
- Longest unbeaten run: 18 matches Buriram United
- Longest winless run: 11 matches Police Tero; PT Prachuap
- Longest losing run: 6 matches Chiangrai United
- Highest attendance: 32,222; Buriram United 8–2 Khonkaen United (26 May 2024)
- Lowest attendance: 904; Police Tero 1–3 Trat (2 December 2023)
- Total attendance: 1,127,630
- Average attendance: 4,698
- All statistics correct as of 26 May 2024.

The 2023–24 Thai League 1 was the 27th season of the Thai League 1, the top Thai professional league for association football clubs, since its establishment in 1996, also known as Hilux Revo Thai League due to the sponsorship deal with Toyota Motor Thailand. A total of 16 teams will compete in the league.

The 1st transfer window is from 25 May to 9 August 2022 while the 2nd transfer window is from 19 December 2022 to 17 January 2023.

Buriram United are the defending champions, while Nakhon Pathom United, Trat, and Uthai Thani have entered as the promoted teams from the 2022–23 Thai League 2.

== Changes from last season ==
=== Team changes ===
==== Promoted clubs ====
Promoted from the 2022–23 Thai League 2

- Nakhon Pathom United
- Trat
- Uthai Thani

==== Relegated clubs ====
Relegated from the 2022–23 Thai League 1

- Nakhon Ratchasima
- Nongbua Pitchaya
- Lampang

== Teams ==
Locations of the 2023–24 Thai League teams
Football clubs in the Bangkok Metropolitan Region

There are 16 clubs in the league, with three promoted teams from Thai League 2 replacing the three teams that were relegated from the 2022-23 season.

Nakhon Ratchasima, Nongbua Pitchaya and Lampang were relegated at the end of the 2022–23 season after finishing in the bottom three places of the table. Lampang made their immediate return to the second-tier, Nongbua Pitchaya ended a 2-year stint in the top-flight, while Nakhon Ratchasima ended an 8-year tenure in the top-flight. The three were replaced by 2022-23 Thai League 2 champions Nakhon Pathom United, who are returning to the top-flight after a 14-year exile that saw them participating in the lowest tier of Thai professional football in the 2018 season. They were joined by runners-up Trat, who are returning to the top-flight after 2 years away and Uthai Thani, the promotion playoff winner which was first held in 2020–21 season. While the 2023-24 season will be Uthai Thani’s debut in the top-flight, their predecessors Air Force United were last featured in the top-flight back in the 2018 season.

== Stadium and locations ==
Note: Table lists in alphabetical order.

Team	Province	Stadium	Capacity
Bangkok United	Pathum Thani (Rangsit)	Thammasat Stadium	19,375
BG Pathum United	Pathum Thani (Thanyaburi)	BG Stadium	15,114
Buriram United	Buriram	Chang Arena	32,600
Chiangrai United	Chiang Rai	Leo Chiangrai Stadium	13,000
Chonburi	Chonburi	Chonburi Stadium	8,680
Khonkaen United	Khon Kaen	Khonkaen PAO. Stadium	7,000
Lamphun Warriors	Lamphun	Mae Guang Stadium	5,000
Muangthong United	Nonthaburi	Thunderdome Stadium	12,505
Nakhon Pathom United	Nakhon Pathom	Nakhon Pathom Municipality Sport School Stadium	6,000
Police Tero	Bangkok (Lak Si)	Boonyachinda Stadium	3,550
Port	Bangkok (Khlong Toei)	PAT Stadium	6,000
PT Prachuap	Prachuap Khiri Khan	Sam Ao Stadium	5,000
Ratchaburi	Ratchaburi	Dragon Solar Park	10,000
Sukhothai	Sukhothai	Thung Thalay Luang Stadium	8,000
Trat	Trat	Trat Provincial Stadium	5,000
Uthai Thani	Uthai Thani	Uthai Thani Provincial Stadium	4,477

== Personnel and sponsoring ==
Note: Flags indicate national team as has been defined under FIFA eligibility rules. Players may hold more than one non-FIFA nationality.

Team	Manager	Captain	Kit manufacturer	Shirt sponsors
Bangkok United	(Thailand) Totchtawan Sripan	(Brazil) Everton	(Thailand) Ari	True; Huawei; Daikin; CP; Smart Heart; Toyota; Ziebart; Euro Cake
BG Pathum United	(Japan) Makoto Teguramori	(Thailand) Sarach Yooyen	(United States) Nike	Leo; Euro Cake; Mitsubishi Electric; Gomuc; Muang Thai Insurance; Yanmar
Buriram United	(Brazil) Jorginho Campos	(Thailand) Narubadin Weerawatnodom	(Thailand) Made by club (Domestic) (Spain) Kelme (Asia)	Chang; Grab; Rabbit; Coca-Cola; Muang Thai Insurance; King Power; Yamaha; Thai AirAsia; TrueVisions; CP; Amari Hotel; Jele
Chiangrai United	(Brazil) Gabriel Magalhães	(Thailand) Sivakorn Tiatrakul	(Thailand) Grand Sport	Singha Lemon Soda; Thai Vietjet Air; TOA
Chonburi	(Thailand) Witthaya Laohakul (caretaker)	(Thailand) Chalermpong Kerdkaew	(Thailand) Made by club	Chang; Euro Cake
Khon Kaen United	(Thailand) Tana Chanabut	(Philippines) Joshua Grommen	(Italy) Kappa	Mitr Phol; Leo; Krungthai-AXA
Lamphun Warriors	(Brazil) Alexandre Gama	(Thailand) Sarawut Inpaen	(Thailand) Warrix	Betagro; Chang
Muangthong United	(Thailand) Uthai Boonmoh (Serbia) Miloš Joksić	(Thailand) Picha Autra	(Thailand) Shoot	Yamaha; Coca-Cola; AIA; Herbalife Nutrition; I-Mobile; Gulf; Sharp
Nakhon Pathom United	(Singapore) Akbar Nawas	(Thailand) Chokchai Chuchai	(Thailand) OCEL	Deedo; Chang; Muang Thai Insurance
Police Tero	(Malaysia) Tan Cheng Hoe	(Ghana) Isaac Honny	(Thailand) FBT	Chang; CP; Thai Union; Thai AirAsia; Major Group; Tero Entertainment; Muang Thai Insurance; Hi-View; Successmore; Chaopraya Hospital; Space plus
Port	(Thailand) Rangsan Viwatchaichok	(Thailand) Tanaboon Kesarat	(Thailand) Grand Sport	Muang Thai Insurance; AirAsia; CP; Thai AirAsia; Thai Union
PT Prachuap	(Thailand) Sasom Pobprasert	(Thailand) Nattapon Malapun	(Thailand) Volt	PTG Energy; Euro Cake; 2Gear
Ratchaburi	(Spain) Carlos Peña	(Thailand) Jakkaphan Kaewprom	(Thailand) Ego Sport	Chang; Dragon Solar Roof; Master Vet; Oxygen Booster; Euro Cake; WoW FItness; Thitikal Ambulance; Kanchana Fresh Meat
Sukhothai	(Japan) Sugao Kambe	(Thailand) Piyarat Lajungreed	(Italy) Kappa	Chang; Carabao; CP
Trat	(Thailand) Santi Chaiyaphuak	(Thailand) Pornpreecha Jarunai	(Thailand) Volt	PTT OR; Muang Thai Insurance
Uthai Thani	(Thailand) Jukkapant Punpee	(Brazil) Ricardo Santos	(Spain) Kelme	GRC; Isuzu Uthai Thani

=== Managerial changes ===
Team	Outgoing manager	Manner of departure	Date of vacancy	Position in the table	Incoming manager	Date of appointment
BG Pathum United	(Thailand) Supachai Komsilp (caretaker)	End of interim spell	8 May 2023	Pre-season	(Thailand) Thongchai Sukkoki	8 May 2023
Nakhon Pathom United	(Thailand) Thongchai Sukkoki	Resigned	8 May 2023	Pre-season	(Singapore) Akbar Nawas	5 June 2023
Chonburi	(Thailand) Adul Lahsoh	End of interim spell	12 May 2023	Pre-season	(Japan) Makoto Teguramori	13 May 2023
Trat	(Thailand) Harnnarong Chunhakunakorn	Resigned	25 May 2023	Pre-season	(Thailand) Santi Chaiyaphuak	18 June 2023
Ratchaburi	(Brazil) Douglas Rodrigues	End of interim spell	23 June 2023	Pre-season	(Spain) Carlos Peña	24 June 2023
Buriram United	(Japan) Masatada Ishii	Signed by Thailand national football team	6 August 2023	Pre-season	(Australia) Arthur Papas	7 August 2023
Uthai Thani	(Thailand) Pattaraphon Naprasert	Redesignated	20 August 2023	16th	(Thailand) Jukkapant Punpee	22 August 2023
Uthai Thani	(Thailand) Jukkapant Punpee	Mutual Consent	8 September 2023	16th	(Sweden) Mikael Stahre	8 September 2023
Muangthong United	(North Macedonia) Mario Gjurovski	Resigned	18 September 2023	14th	(Thailand) Uthai Boonmoh (interim) (Serbia) Miloš Joksić (interim)	18 September 2023
PT Prachuap	(Thailand) Thawatchai Damrong-Ongtrakul	Resigned	1 October 2023	12th	(Thailand) Weerayut Binabdullahman (caretaker)	1 October 2023
Sukhothai	(Thailand) Chusak Sriphum	Resigned	4 October 2023	15th	(Thailand) Laksana Kamruen (caretaker)	4 October 2023
PT Prachuap	(Thailand) Weerayut Binabdullahman (caretaker)	End of caretaker spell	11 October 2023	12th	(Montenegro) Božidar Bandović	11 October 2023
Khon Kaen United	(Thailand) Patipat Robroo	Resigned	23 October 2023	14th	(Thailand) Ekalak Thong-am (caretaker)	24 October 2023
Police Tero	(Thailand) Rangsan Viwatchaichok	Resigned	7 November 2023	9th	(Thailand) Worrawoot Srimaka (caretaker)	9 November 2023
Port	(Thailand) Surapong Kongthep	Mutual Consent	8 November 2023	2nd	(Thailand) Rangsan Viwatchaichok	8 November 2023
Port	(Thailand) Choketawee Promrut	Redesignated	8 November 2023	2nd	(Thailand) Rangsan Viwatchaichok	8 November 2023
Sukhothai	(Thailand) Laksana Kamruen (caretaker)	End of interim spell	25 November 2023	12th	(Japan) Sugao Kambe	25 November 2023
Chonburi	(Japan) Makoto Teguramori	Resigned	7 December 2023	15th	(Thailand) Nattawut Vichitrawetakan (caretaker)	7 December 2023
PT Prachuap	(Montenegro) Božidar Bandović	Resigned	12 December 2023	16th	(Thailand) Dusit Chalermsan (interim)	12 December 2023
BG Pathum United	(Thailand) Thongchai Sukkoki	Resigned	24 December 2023	2nd	(Japan) Makoto Teguramori	25 December 2023
PT Prachuap	(Thailand) Dusit Chalermsan	End of interim spell	31 January 2024	16th	(Thailand) Sasom Pobprasert	31 January 2024
Police Tero	(Thailand) Worrawoot Srimaka (caretaker)	End of interim spell	24 February 2024	14th	(Malaysia) Tan Cheng Hoe	29 February 2024
Buriram United	(Australia) Arthur Papas	Sacked	21 March 2024	1st	(Brazil) Jorginho Campos	25 March 2024
Uthai Thani	(Sweden) Mikael Stahre	Sacked	21 April 2024	14th	(Thailand) Jukkapant Punpee	21 April 2024
Khon Kaen United	(Thailand) Ekalak Thong-am	Redesignated	30 April 2024	10th	(Thailand) Tana Chanabut	30 April 2024
Buriram United	(Brazil) Jorginho Campos	Mutual Consent	21 May 2024	1st	(Brazil) Emerson Pereira da Silva	22 May 2024

== League table ==
Pos	Team	Pld	W	D	L	GF	GA	GD	Pts	Qualification
1	Buriram United (C, Q)	30	20	9	1	70	27	+43	69	Qualification for AFC Champions League Elite League stage
2	Bangkok United (Q)	30	17	10	3	58	24	+34	61	Qualification for AFC Champions League Elite Qualifying play-off
3	Port (Q)	30	16	9	5	72	37	+35	57	Qualification for AFC Champions League Two group stage
4	BG Pathum United	30	15	9	6	59	38	+21	54	
5	Muangthong United (Note: Qualified for the Champions League Two group stage due to Đông Á Thanh Hóa's withdrawal from the competition and BG Pathum United's decision not to participate.) (Q)	30	16	4	10	64	45	+19	52	Qualification for AFC Champions League Two group stage
6	Ratchaburi	30	11	6	13	39	35	+4	39	
7	Uthai Thani	30	9	8	13	39	55	−16	35 (Note: The mini-league points record; Uthai Thani 8 pts, Khonkaen United 5 pts, Lamphun Warriors 2 pts.)	
8	Khonkaen United	30	8	11	11	44	58	−14	35	
9	Lamphun Warriors	30	9	8	13	45	47	−2	35	
10	PT Prachuap	30	8	10	12	33	39	−6	34 (Note: PT Prachuap are ahead of Chiangrai United on head-to-head points: PT Prachuap 4, Chiangrai United 1.)	
11	Chiangrai United	30	8	10	12	31	35	−4	34	
12	Nakhon Pathom United	30	8	9	13	37	53	−16	33	
13	Sukhothai	30	9	5	16	34	60	−26	32	
14	Chonburi (R)	30	7	9	14	33	52	−19	30	Relegation to Thai League 2
15	Police Tero (R)	30	7	7	16	38	67	−29	28	Relegation to Thai League 2
16	Trat (R)	30	6	8	16	40	64	−24	26	Relegation to Thai League 2

Updated to match(es) played on 26 May 2024. Source: Thai League
Rules for classification: Season in progress: 1) Points; 2) Goal difference; 3) Goals scored; End of season: 1) Points; 2) Head-to-head points; 3) Head-to-head goal difference; 4) Goals scored.
(C) Champions; (Q) Qualified for the phase indicated; (R) Relegated

=== Positions by round ===
The table lists the positions of teams after each week of matches. In order to preserve chronological evolvements, any postponed matches are not included in the round at which they were originally scheduled, but added to the full round they were played immediately afterwards. For example, if a match is scheduled for matchday 13, but then postponed and played between days 16 and 17, it will be added to the standings for day 16.

Team ╲ Round	1	2	3	4	5	6	7	8	9	10	11	12	13	14	15	16	17	18	19	20	21	22	23	24	25	26	27	28	29	30
Buriram United	11	3	3	2	2	3	3	4	4	4	4	4	4	4	2	2	2	1	1	1	1	1	1	1	1	1	1	1	1	1
Bangkok United	1	2	1	1	1	2	2	3	2	1	1	1	1	1	1	1	1	2	3	3	2	2	2	2	2	2	2	2	2	2
Port	9	4	2	3	3	1	1	1	1	2	3	3	3	3	3	3	3	3	2	2	3	3	3	3	3	3	3	3	3	3
BG Pathum United	5	8	5	5	5	5	4	2	3	3	2	2	2	2	4	4	4	4	4	4	4	4	4	4	4	4	4	4	4	4
Muangthong United	14	12	14	14	13	8	6	9	11	6	9	11	6	7	10	13	13	8	8	8	7	6	5	5	5	5	5	5	5	5
Ratchaburi	15	14	13	9	11	7	8	6	8	11	12	8	11	10	12	6	6	6	5	5	5	5	6	6	6	6	6	6	6	6
Uthai Thani	16	16	16	16	16	12	14	11	7	7	11	12	7	8	11	11	11	12	13	13	12	12	14	12	14	11	10	7	8	7
Khonkaen United	12	11	10	12	7	11	13	14	12	14	14	14	14	14	13	10	10	11	12	12	13	11	9	10	11	10	9	10	7	8
Lamphun Warriors	13	15	15	15	15	16	16	16	15	15	13	13	13	12	6	7	8	7	7	6	6	7	7	7	7	9	11	13	12	9
PT Prachuap	4	7	7	8	10	14	12	13	16	16	16	16	16	16	16	16	16	16	16	16	15	15	13	14	12	13	12	12	9	10
Chiangrai United	3	1	4	4	4	4	5	5	5	5	5	5	8	5	5	5	5	5	6	7	8	8	10	11	8	7	7	8	10	11
Nakhon Pathom United	7	5	6	6	6	6	9	7	9	8	8	6	9	11	7	9	7	9	9	9	9	9	8	8	9	8	8	9	11	12
Sukhothai	2	6	8	10	12	15	15	15	14	12	7	9	12	6	9	8	9	10	11	10	10	10	11	9	10	12	13	11	13	13
Chonburi	6	9	12	7	9	13	11	12	13	13	15	15	15	15	15	15	14	14	10	11	11	13	12	13	13	14	14	14	15	14
Police Tero	8	13	9	11	14	9	10	8	10	9	6	10	5	9	8	12	12	13	14	14	14	16	16	16	15	16	16	16	14	15
Trat	10	10	11	13	8	10	7	10	6	10	10	7	10	13	14	14	15	15	15	15	16	14	15	15	16	15	15	15	16	16

Leader and qualification to the 2024–25 AFC Champions League Elite
Relegation to the 2024–25 Thai League 2

Source: Thai League

=== Results by match played ===
Team ╲ Round	1	2	3	4	5	6	7	8	9	10	11	12	13	14	15	16	17	18	19	20	21	22	23	24	25	26	27	28	29	30
Bangkok United	W	D	W	W	W	W	W	W	D	W	W	W	D	D	L	W	D	D	L	W	W	W	D	D	W	D	D	W	L	W
BG Pathum United	D	D	W	W	L	W	W	W	D	W	W	W	D	L	D	D	W	L	D	L	W	L	D	W	D	L	W	W	W	W
Buriram United	D	W	W	W	W	D	D	D	D	D	W	L	W	W	W	W	W	W	W	W	D	W	D	W	W	W	W	D	W	W
Chiangrai United	W	W	D	W	L	W	L	D	D	D	L	L	W	D	D	D	W	D	L	L	L	L	L	L	W	W	D	D	L	L
Chonburi	D	D	L	W	L	D	D	W	L	L	L	L	L	W	D	L	W	L	W	D	D	L	W	L	D	L	L	D	L	W
Khonkaen United	D	D	D	L	W	L	L	L	W	D	D	D	L	D	W	W	L	D	L	D	L	W	W	L	D	W	D	L	W	L
Lamphun Warriors	L	L	L	L	W	L	D	L	W	D	W	D	W	D	W	L	W	W	W	L	D	L	D	D	L	L	L	L	D	W
Muangthong United	L	D	L	L	W	W	W	L	L	W	L	D	W	D	L	L	L	W	D	W	W	W	W	W	W	L	W	W	W	W
Nakhon Pathom United	D	W	D	W	L	L	L	W	L	D	D	W	L	L	W	L	D	D	D	D	W	L	W	L	L	W	L	D	L	L
Police Tero	D	L	W	L	L	W	D	W	L	D	W	L	W	L	D	L	L	L	L	D	L	L	L	D	W	L	D	L	W	L
Port	D	W	W	W	L	W	W	W	L	L	D	L	W	W	W	W	W	D	W	D	D	D	W	D	L	W	W	D	D	W
PT Prachuap	W	D	D	L	L	L	D	L	L	L	L	L	W	D	L	D	D	D	W	L	W	D	W	L	W	D	W	D	W	L
Ratchaburi	L	L	D	W	L	W	D	W	L	L	D	W	L	D	L	W	W	W	W	D	W	L	L	W	L	L	L	L	D	W
Sukhothai	W	D	L	L	L	L	L	W	D	W	W	D	L	W	L	D	L	D	L	W	L	W	L	W	L	L	L	W	L	L
Trat	D	D	D	L	W	L	W	L	W	L	D	W	L	L	L	D	L	L	L	D	L	W	L	L	D	W	L	L	D	L
Uthai Thani	L	L	L	L	W	W	L	W	W	D	L	D	W	D	L	D	L	D	L	D	D	D	L	W	L	W	W	W	L	L

Source: Thai League
W = Win; D = Draw; L = Lose

== Results ==
Home \ Away	BKU	BGP	BRU	CRU	CBR	KKU	LWR	MTU	NPU	PTR	POR	PTP	RBM	SUK	TRA	UTT
Bangkok United	—	2–0	0–1	2–1	6–0	4–0	1–1	0–0	1–1	1–1	2–2	0–0	3–1	3–0	5–0	3–0
BG Pathum United	2–2	—	1–1	2–2	1–1	3–2	3–0	5–2	1–2	4–2	1–3	0–0	2–1	7–1	3–0	2–0
Buriram United	3–2	0–0	—	2–1	2–2	8–2	3–0	3–1	4–1	6–2	1–1	1–0	0–0	4–0	4–0	4–0
Chiangrai United	0–1	2–3	0–0	—	1–1	2–0	0–2	2–3	0–0	1–2	1–1	1–1	1–0	2–1	3–1	3–0
Chonburi	0–0	1–3	1–1	2–0	—	0–0	1–0	2–1	0–1	4–2	0–2	1–1	0–1	3–1	3–2	0–2
Khonkaen United	2–2	1–1	0–0	0–0	1–0	—	2–2	0–1	2–1	4–0	0–0	4–3	2–2	5–1	1–1	2–2
Lamphun Warriors	0–2	2–0	1–2	2–1	2–1	2–3	—	3–1	2–0	1–1	2–2	2–1	1–1	1–2	5–1	1–2
Muangthong United	1–2	2–0	2–2	0–1	6–0	4–0	2–1	—	3–1	3–1	1–3	2–1	1–1	5–0	2–0	5–2
Nakhon Pathom United	1–2	1–3	0–2	1–2	1–0	4–2	1–0	2–2	—	1–2	2–2	1–1	0–1	2–2	2–1	2–1
Police Tero	3–0	2–2	1–2	0–0	3–2	1–3	2–2	2–1	1–1	—	0–4	1–1	0–1	2–3	1–3	1–0
Port	0–2	2–3	4–1	1–2	2–0	6–1	3–2	4–3	6–0	3–1	—	3–1	3–0	1–0	1–0	3–3
PT Prachuap	0–1	1–1	1–2	1–0	3–1	1–0	2–0	1–3	2–2	2–0	1–1	—	1–0	2–1	2–1	1–2
Ratchaburi	1–2	0–1	1–4	3–0	1–2	1–0	2–0	1–2	0–1	6–1	2–2	3–0	—	3–1	3–1	1–0
Sukhothai	0–0	1–2	0–1	2–1	3–2	2–3	0–3	1–2	3–1	2–0	2–1	2–0	1–0	—	0–0	1–3
Trat	1–2	2–1	3–4	0–0	2–2	2–2	2–2	0–1	4–3	4–2	2–1	1–0	2–2	1–1	—	2–3
Uthai Thani	1–4	0–2	0–2	1–1	1–1	2–0	2–2	4–2	1–1	0–1	1–5	2–2	1–0	0–0	3–1	—

Updated to match(es) played on 26 May 2024. Source: Thai League
Legend: Blue = home team win; Yellow = draw; Red = away team win.

== Season statistics ==
=== Top scorers ===
As of 26 May 2024.

Rank	Player	Club(s)	Goals
1	(Thailand) Supachai Chaided	Buriram United	21
2	(Brazil) Willen Mota	Bangkok United	20
3	(Brazil) Willian Popp	Muangthong United	17
4	(Brazil) Guilherme Bissoli	Buriram United	16
4	(Brazil) Ricardo Santos	Uthai Thani	16
6	(Brazil) Willian Lira	Chonburi	15
6	(Thailand) Teerasak Poeiphimai	Port	15
8	(South Korea) Jeong Woo-geun	Police Tero (10 Goals); PT Prachuap (4 Goals)	14
9	(Brazil) Barros Tardeli	Port	12
10	(Thailand) Poramet Arjvirai	Muangthong United	11

=== Hat-tricks ===
Player	For	Against	Result	Date
(Nigeria) Adefolarin Durosinmi	Nakhon Pathom United	Khonkaen United	4–2 (H)	21 October 2023
(Brazil) Willen Mota	Bangkok United	Khonkaen United	4–0 (H)	9 December 2023
(Thailand) Teerasak Poeiphimai	Port	Muangthong United	4–3 (H)	14 February 2024
(Brazil) Guilherme Bissoli ^{4}	Buriram United	Police Tero	6–2 (H)	24 February 2024
(Brazil) Willian Lira	Chonburi	Sukhothai	3–1 (H)	25 February 2024
(Thailand) Poramet Arjvirai	Muangthong United	Khonkaen United	4–0 (H)	10 March 2024
(Brazil) Willen Mota	Bangkok United	Trat	5–0 (H)	12 May 2024
(Brazil) Brenner	Khonkaen United	Sukhothai	5–1 (H)	19 May 2024
(Thailand) Supachai Chaided	Buriram United	Khonkaen United	8–2 (H)	26 May 2024
(Thailand) Teeraphol Yoryoei	Muangthong United	Chiangrai United	2–3 (A)	26 May 2024

=== Clean sheets ===
As of 26 May 2024.

Rank	Player	Club	Clean sheets
1	(Thailand) Patiwat Khammai	Bangkok United	13
1	(Thailand) Siwarak Tedsungnoen	Buriram United	13
3	(Thailand) Saranon Anuin	Chiangrai United	9
3	(Thailand) Chatchai Budprom	BG Pathum United / PT Prachuap	9
3	(Thailand) Kampol Pathomakkakul	Ratchaburi	9
6	(Thailand) Somporn Yos	Port	7
7	(Thailand) Chirawat Wangthaphan	Khonkaen United	6
7	(Thailand) Kawin Thamsatchanan	Muangthong United	6
7	(Thailand) Wattanachai Srathongjan	Nakhon Pathom United	6
7	(Thailand) Kittipun Saensuk	Sukhothai	6

== Awards ==
=== Monthly awards ===
Month	Coach of the Month		Player of the Month		Goal of the month		Reference
Month	Coach	Club	Player	Club	Player	Club	Reference
August	(Thailand) Totchtawan Sripan	Bangkok United	(Thailand) Chirawat Wangthaphan	Khonkaen United	(Thailand) Siam Yapp	Police Tero	
September	(Thailand) Surapong Kongthep	Port	(Azerbaijan) Ramil Sheydayev	Buriram United	(Brazil) Dennis Murillo	Lamphun Warriors	
October	(Sweden) Mikael Stahre	Uthai Thani	(Madagascar) Njiva Rakotoharimalala	Ratchaburi	(Thailand) Kevin Deeromram	Port	
November	(Thailand) Laksana Kamruen	Sukhothai	(Madagascar) John Baggio	Sukhothai	(Brazil) Bill	Chiangrai United	
December	(Thailand) Rangsan Viwatchaichok	Port	(Thailand) Supachai Chaided	Buriram United	(Japan) Noboru Shimura	Port	
February	(Australia) Arthur Papas	Buriram United	(Brazil) Guilherme Bissoli	Buriram United	(Brazil) Guilherme Bissoli	Buriram United	
March	(Thailand) Uthai Boonmoh (Serbia) Miloš Joksić	Muangthong United	(Iraq) Jiloan Hamad	Uthai Thani	(Thailand) Surawich Logarwit	Sukhothai	
April	(Thailand) Sasom Pobprasert	PT Prachuap	(Brazil) Willian Popp	Muangthong United	(Thailand) Chitsanupong Choti	Khon Kaen United	
May	(Japan) Makoto Teguramori	BG Pathum United	(Brazil) Willian Popp	Muangthong United	(Philippines) Dennis Villanueva	Police Tero	

== Attendances ==
=== Overall statistical table ===
Pos	Team	Total	High	Low	Average	Change
1	Buriram United	310,064	32,222	15,087	20,671	−3.6%
2	BG Pathum United	122,083	14,184	5,601	8,139	+41.8%
3	Muangthong United	73,163	11,772	2,723	4,878	−3.1%
4	Chonburi	71,322	8,463	3,274	4,755	+2.2%
5	Khonkaen United	68,965	6,500	3,068	4,598	−1.6%
6	Port	67,640	6,250	2,804	4,509	−4.1%
7	Chiangrai United	60,556	10,195	1,904	4,037	+98.9%
8	Ratchaburi	50,097	6,790	2,394	3,340	−8.3%
9	PT Prachuap	44,706	4,690	2,147	2,980	+62.7%
10	Uthai Thani	43,814	5,010	1,631	2,921	+218.5%^{†}
11	Lamphun Warriors	43,516	3,439	1,929	2,901	+65.2%
12	Bangkok United	41,730	9,132	1,101	2,782	+8.6%
13	Nakhon Pathom United	40,001	4,879	1,515	2,667	+102.4%^{†}
14	Sukhothai	32,816	7,673	1,137	2,188	−37.6%
15	Trat	29,752	3,839	1,049	1,983	+112.8%^{†}
16	Police Tero	27,405	4,376	904	1,827	+32.8%
	League total	1,127,630	32,222	904	4,698	+6.0%

Updated to games played on 26 May 2024
Source: Thai League
Notes:
^{†} Teams played previous season in Thai League 2

=== Attendances by home match played ===
Team \ Match played	1	2	3	4	5	6	7	8	9	10	11	12	13	14	15	Total
Bangkok United	5,283	1,533	4,041	2,141	2,585	1,448	1,523	1,896	9,132	2,693	3,876	1,134	1,532	1,101	1,812	39,918
BG Pathum United	8,270	10,109	6,346	5,601	6,281	5,809	5,731	6,172	10,074	6,815	14,184	10,108	11,450	6,875	8,258	122,083
Buriram United	16,606	16,753	16,813	27,548	15,087	15,961	15,835	17,672	16,893	24,105	16,479	16,778	30,112	31,200	32,222	310,064
Chiangrai United	2,367	1,904	3,736	10,195	4,751	4,786	2,952	2,661	2,549	3,802	3,935	5,150	3,114	3,068	5,586	60,556
Chonburi	3,967	3,959	4,418	5,251	5,510	3,916	4,259	3,274	4,212	8,463	3,854	4,643	4,012	5,617	5,967	71,322
Khonkaen United	6,500	4,879	3,976	5,276	3,974	3,241	6,127	4,719	4,361	5,611	3,068	3,519	3,452	5,310	4,952	68,965
Lamphun Warriors	3,239	3,129	3,220	1,929	2,015	2,505	3,139	2,692	3,239	3,050	3,239	3,239	2,754	2,888	3,239	43,516
Muangthong United	6,712	5,143	3,517	11,772	3,711	4,372	7,822	3,842	3,717	3,511	2,723	3,242	3,117	3,529	6,433	73,163
Nakhon Pathom United	4,848	2,250	3,266	1,789	1,765	2,654	2,351	2,648	1,515	3,241	1,666	1,555	1,899	4,879	3,675	40,001
Police Tero	4,376	2,478	3,147	1,428	2,798	1,375	1,475	904	1,285	2,461	1,024	1,250	1,191	1,025	1,188	27,405
Port	4,733	4,522	3,758	4,265	5,093	5,862	6,250	4,361	5,116	4,188	4,261	2,804	3,769	4,942	3,716	67,640
PT Prachuap	2,563	3,690	3,309	2,589	2,570	2,147	3,890	2,840	2,986	2,615	2,512	2,347	2,780	3,178	4,690	44,706
Ratchaburi	4,361	2,394	2,975	2,897	2,923	2,797	2,953	3,379	3,227	3,177	6,790	3,274	3,348	2,879	2,723	50,097
Sukhothai	2,894	7,673	3,384	2,373	1,662	1,162	1,670	1,380	1,685	1,397	1,443	1,422	1,731	1,137	1,803	32,816
Trat	2,995	2,665	2,839	1,618	1,514	2,639	1,049	1,826	1,995	1,295	3,839	1,235	1,826	1,278	1,139	29,752
Uthai Thani	3,154	5,009	2,406	4,472	3,976	1,868	1,777	2,450	2,552	2,214	2,515	2,251	1,631	2,529	5,010	43,814

Source: Thai League

== See also ==
- 2023–24 Thai League 2
- 2023–24 Thai League 3
- Thailand Semi-Pro League
- 2024 Thailand Amateur League
- 2023–24 Thai FA Cup
- 2023–24 Thai League Cup
- 2023 Thailand Champions Cup
