= Komsan Merndee =

Thai footballer (born 1993)

Personal information
- Full name: Komsan Merndee
- Date of birth: 6 March 1993 (age 33)
- Place of birth: Surin, Thailand
- Height: 1.73 m (5 ft 8 in)
- Position: Defensive midfielder

Senior career*
Years	Team	Apps	(Gls)
2015	Navy	24	(0)
2016–2019	Sisaket	50	(2)
2019	Air Force Central		
2020	Uthai Thani		
- * Club domestic league appearances and goals

Komsan Merndee (Thai: คมสันต์ เมินดี;) is a Thai footballer who plays as a defensive midfielder.
