= Laksana Kamruen =

Thai footballer (born 1986)

Personal information
- Full name: Laksana Kamruen
- Date of birth: 15 July 1986 (age 40)
- Place of birth: Ayutthaya, Thailand
- Height: 1.75 m (5 ft 9 in)
- Position: Right-back

Team information
- Current team: Chainat Hornbill (head coach)

Senior career*
Years	Team	Apps	(Gls)
2011	Ayutthaya	14	(2)
2012	TTM Chiangmai	29	(3)
2013	Pattaya United	16	(2)
2014–2019	Chainat Hornbill	71	(5)
2016	→ Sukhothai (loan)	6	(0)
2020–2022	Khon Kaen United	28	(2)
2022–2024	Sukhothai	0	(0)
Total		164	(14)

Managerial career
- 2022–2023: Sukhothai (assistant)
- 2023: Sukhothai (interim)
- 2025–: Chainat Hornbill
- * Club domestic league appearances and goals

Laksana Kamruen (Thai: ลักษณะ คำรืน, born March 15, 1986), simply known as Lak (Thai: ลัก), is a Thai professional football manager and former player who played as a right-back. He is the head coach of Thai League 2 club Chainat Hornbill.

== Managerial statistics ==
As of match played 21 November 2026

Managerial record by team and tenure
Team	From	To	Record				
Team	From	To	P	W	D	L	Win %
Sukhothai	16 March 2023	12 May 2023	7	2	2	3	28.6
Sukhothai	4 October 2023	24 November 2023	6	3	1	2	50.0
Chainat Hornbill	16 June 2025	Present	52	17	15	20	32.7
Total			65	22	18	25	33.8

== Honours ==
=== Manager ===
Individual

- Thai League 1 Coach of the Month: November 2023
