= Balanta =

Balanta may refer to:

== Surname ==
- Ángelo Balanta, Colombian footballer
- Deivy Balanta, Colombian footballer
- Éder Álvarez Balanta, Colombian footballer
- Kevin Balanta, Colombian footballer
- Leyvin Balanta, Colombian footballer

== Ethnic groups ==
- Balanta people, West African ethnic group
- Balanta language, spoken in West Africa

== Other ==
- Balanţa, Romanian film known in English as The Oak
