= Jaime Giraldo =

Colombian footballer (born 1998)

Personal information
- Full name: Jaime Andrés Giraldo Ocampo
- Date of birth: 8 February 1998 (age 28)
- Place of birth: Medellín, Colombia
- Height: 1.91 m (6 ft 3 in)
- Position: Centre-back

Team information
- Current team: Uthai Thani
- Number: 2

Youth career
- Independiente Medellín

Senior career*
Years	Team	Apps	(Gls)
2017–2021	Independiente Medellín	23	(0)
2021	Deportivo Pasto	7	(0)
2022	Atlético Bucaramanga	6	(0)
2022–2023	Atlético Huila	17	(0)
2024	Unión Magdalena	33	(0)
2025	Operário Ferroviário	12	(0)
2026	Semen Padang	15	(1)
2026–	Uthai Thani	0	(0)
- * Club domestic league appearances and goals as of 23 May 2026

Jaime Andrés Giraldo Ocampo (born 8 February 1998) is a Colombian professional footballer who plays as a centre-back for Thai League 1 club Uthai Thani.

== Club career ==
Born in Medellín, Colombia, Giraldo represented Independiente Medellín as a youth, he was called up for the first time to Independiente Medellín's first team for the match against Cortuluá, although he was unable to make his debut. He made his professional debut with the club on 3 September 2017 in the Torneo DIMAYOR match against Independiente Santa Fe, playing as a starter under coach Juan José Peláez in the 0–1 defeat.

In July 2021, he signed a contract with Deportivo Pasto for 2021 season. He made his debut on 19 July 2017, in the 1–3 home loss to Millonarios. The following December 2021, after seven team appearances, he was loaned to Atlético Bucaramanga until 2022.

In June 2022, Atlético Huila announced the signing of Giraldo until 2023. In 2022–23 season, Giraldo appeared in 17 matches.

In January 2024, it was announced that Giraldo would move to Unión Magdalena. He made his debut for the club in a 0–2 away win against Bogotá on 3 February. Giraldo became a regular starter for Los Samarios, and saw an improvement in his performances for the side in the number of matches, at the same time, he led his team to the championship title in the 2024 season.

=== Operário Ferroviário ===
On 16 December 2024, Giraldo moved abroad for the first time in his career, after agreeing to a year contract with Campeonato Brasileiro Série B club Operário Ferroviário. He made his Série B debut with the club on 24 August 2025 against Paysandú, playing as a starter in a 1–2 victory. On 24 November 2025, he and nine other players officially left the club, in total, he has played 16 matches in all competitions and provided one assist for Operário Ferroviário.

=== Semen Padang ===
On 6 January 2026, Giraldo signed a year contract with Semen Padang in Indonesia.

== Honours ==
=== Club ===
Independiente Medellín

- Copa Colombia: 2019

Unión Magdalena

- Torneo DIMAYOR: 2024
