= Natthapat Makthuam =

Thai footballer (born 2005)

Personal information
- Full name: Natthapat Makthuam
- Date of birth: 10 January 2005 (age 21)
- Place of birth: Saraburi, Thailand
- Height: 1.80 m (5 ft 11 in)
- Position: Goalkeeper

Team information
- Current team: Khon Kaen United
- Number: 29

Youth career
- 2021–2022: Khlong Khon Academy

Senior career*
Years	Team	Apps	(Gls)
2023–2024	Police Tero	23	(0)
2025–	Khon Kaen United	2	(0)

International career^{‡}
2024–	Thailand U23	1	(0)
- * Club domestic league appearances and goals as of 13 April 2025 ‡ National team caps and goals as of 20 March 2024

Natthapat Makthuam (Thai: ณัฐภัทร มากท้วม, born 10 January 2005) is a Thai professional footballer who plays as a goalkeeper for Thai League 2 club Khon Kaen United.
