= Khon Kaen Sports School Stadium =

Multi-purpose stadium in Thailand

Coordinates: 16.455908°N 102.946940°E

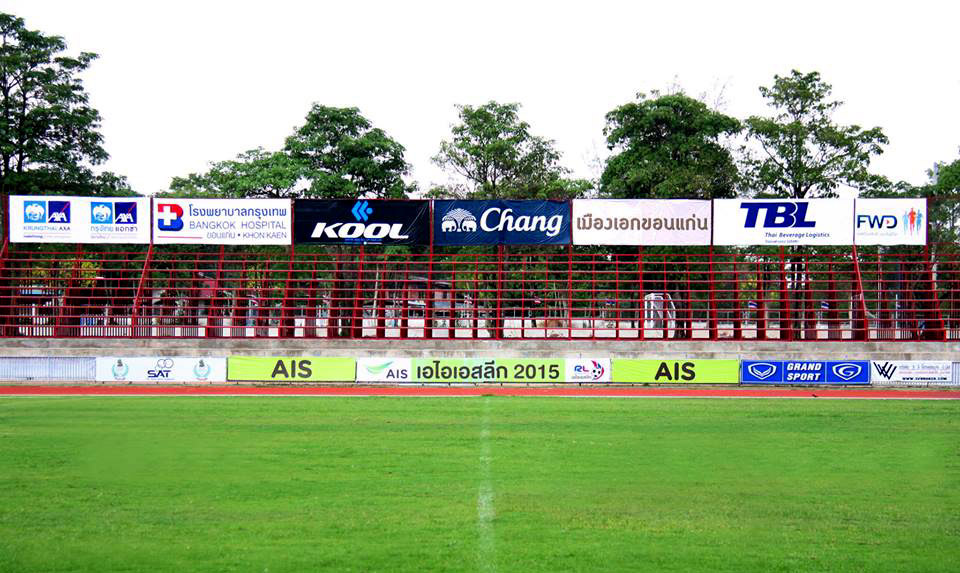
- Interactive map of Khon Kaen Sports School Stadium
- Location: Khon Kaen, Thailand
- Capacity: 2,500
- Surface: Grass

Tenant
- Khon Kaen United F.C.

Khon Kaen Sports School Stadium (Thai: สนาม รร.กีฬาขอนแก่น) is a multi-purpose stadium in Khon Kaen Province, Thailand and is part of the Khon Kaen Provincial Sports School. It is currently used mostly for football matches and is the home stadium of Khon Kaen United F.C. The stadium holds 2,500 people.
