= Seth Sincere =

Nigerian footballer

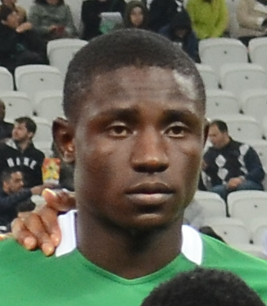

Personal information
- Full name: Seth Muenfuh Sincere
- Date of birth: 28 April 1998 (age 28)
- Place of birth: Abuja, Nigeria
- Height: 1.77 m (5 ft 10 in)
- Position: Right back

Youth career
- 2013–2017: Rhapsody FC

Senior career*
| Years | Team | Apps | (Gls) |
| 2017–2020 | Yeni Malatyaspor | 14 | (0) |
| 2019–2020 | → Boluspor (loan) | 19 | (0) |
| 2022–2024 | FK Kauno Žalgiris | 49 | (2) |

International career^{‡}
| 2016 | Nigeria U-23 | 6 | (0) |
Medal record
Olympic Games
| Bronze medal – third place | 2016 Rio de Janeiro | Team |
- * Club domestic league appearances and goals as of 5 December 2024 ‡ National team caps and goals as of 18 October 2017

Seth Muenfuh Sincere (born 28 April 1998) is a Nigerian footballer who plays as a right back.

== Professional career ==
Sincere joined Yeni Malatyaspor after 4 years in the Rhapsody Academy in Nigeria. Sincere made his professional debut for Yeni Malatyaspor in a 3–1 Süper Lig loss to Fenerbahçe on 15 October 2017.

== International career ==
He represented Nigeria at the 2015 African Games, 2015 Africa U-23 Cup of Nations and the 2016 Summer Olympics.

== Honours ==
Nigeria U23

- Olympic Bronze Medal: 2016
