= Jukkapant Punpee =

Thai footballer (born 1979)

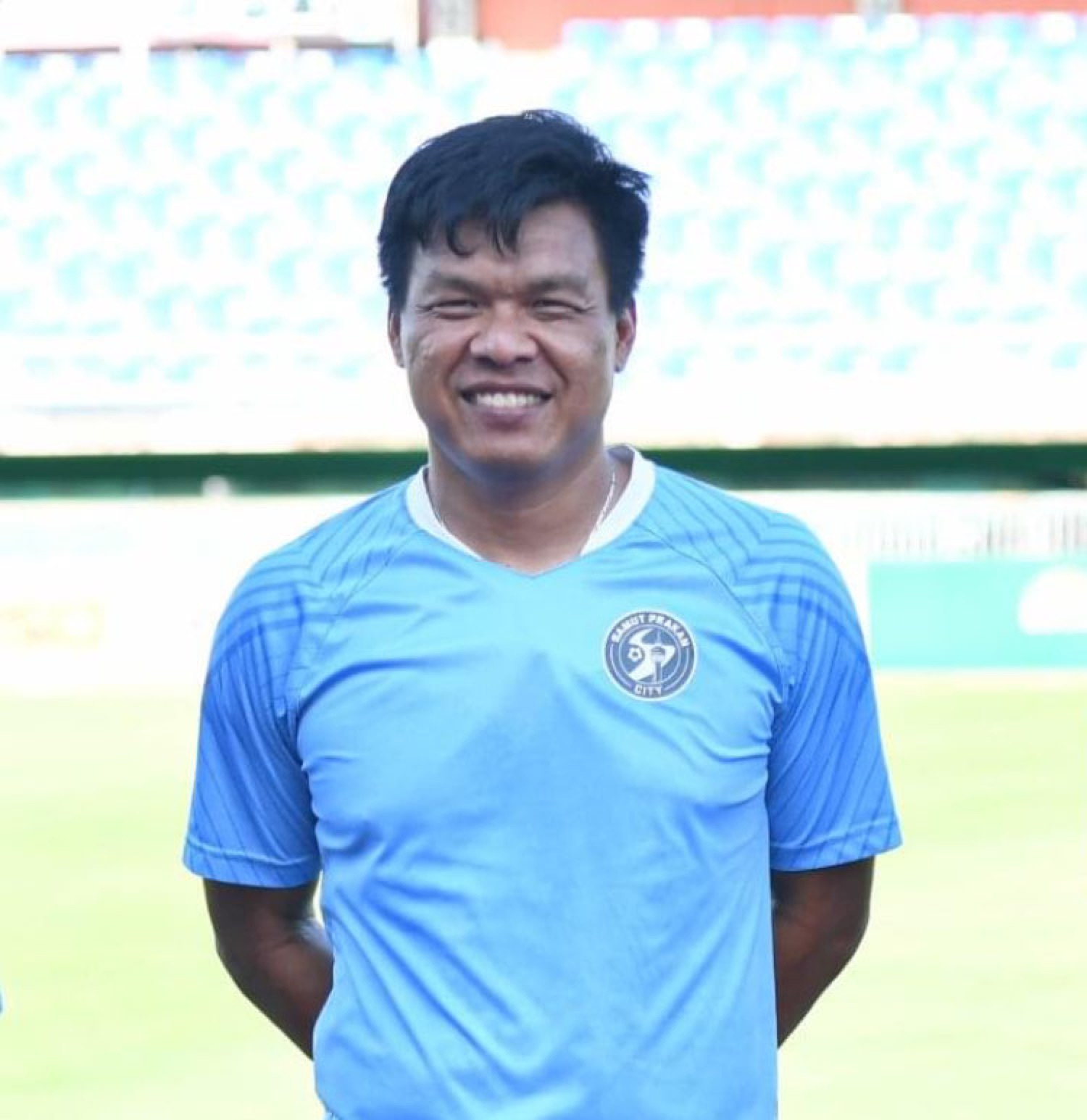
- Punpee as head coach of Samut Prakan City in 2022

Personal information
- Full name: Jukkapant Punpee
- Date of birth: 2 April 1979 (age 47)
- Place of birth: Ang Thong, Thailand
- Height: 1.78 m (5 ft 10 in)
- Position: Defender

Team information
- Current team: Thailand U20 (head coach)

Youth career
- 1994–1996: Assumption College Sriracha

Senior career*
Years	Team	Apps	(Gls)
- Chonburi

International career
2001–2002	Thailand U23		

Managerial career
- 2010–2011: Chonburi (assistant)
- 2012: Angthong
- 2013–2014: Phan Thong
- 2015–2018: Chonburi (assistant)
- 2018–2019: Chonburi
- 2019–2022: Chonburi (assistant)
- 2022–2023: Samut Prakan City
- 2023: Uthai Thani
- 2024: Uthai Thani
- 2024–2026: Rayong
- 2026–: Thailand U20
Medal record
Thailand under-23
Sea Games
Gold medal – first place	Sea Games 2001	Football
- * Club domestic league appearances and goals as of 22 June 2008

Jukkapant Punpee (Thai: จักรพันธ์ ปั่นปี) is a Thai professional football manager and former player. He is the currently head coach of Thailand U20.

== Managerial career ==
=== Uthai Thani ===
On 22 April 2024, Punpee was appointed as manager of Uthai Thani to replace Mikael Stahre until the end of the 2023–24 season, with the club third-bottom of the Thai League 1 with five games left to play. On his debut on 27 April 2024, he won 3–1 at Sukhothai.

=== Rayong ===
On 4 November 2024, Punpee was announced as the new head coach of Thai League 1 club Rayong, succeeding Carlos Eduardo Parreira.

== Managerial statistics ==
As of match played 6 September 2026

Managerial record by team and tenure
Team	From	To	Record				
Team	From	To	P	W	D	L	Win %
Chonburi	4 April 2018	31 May 2019	48	19	10	19	39.6
Samut Prakan City	4 July 2022	21 January 2023	22	6	8	8	27.3
Uthai Thani	22 August 2023	8 September 2023	1	0	0	1	0.0
Uthai Thani	21 April 2024	26 August 2024	8	3	2	3	37.5
Rayong	4 November 2024	18 May 2026	54	16	17	21	29.6
Thailand U20	18 May 2026	Present	9	6	0	3	66.7
Total			142	50	37	55	35.2

== Honours ==
=== Player ===
Thailand U23

- Sea Games: 2001 (gold) Gold
- Asian Games: 2002 (Fourth place)

=== Manager ===
Thailand U20

- ASEAN U-19 Boys' Championship: 2026 (silver) Runners-up
