= Sirimongkol Rattanapoom =

Thai footballer (born 2002)

Personal information
- Full name: Sirimongkol Rattanapoom
- Date of birth: 21 May 2002 (age 24)
- Place of birth: Nakhon Sawan, Thailand
- Height: 1.76 m (5 ft 9 in)
- Positions: Defensive midfielder; left-back

Team information
- Current team: Uthai Thani
- Number: 21

Senior career*
Years	Team	Apps	(Gls)
2022–2024	OH Leuven U23	15	(0)
2024–	Uthai Thani	9	(0)
- * Club domestic league appearances and goals

Sirimongkol Rattanapoom (Thai: ศิริมงคล รัตนภูมิ; born 21 May 2002) is a Thai footballer who plays as a defensive midfielder or a left-back for Uthai Thani.

== Club career ==
In 2022, Rattanapoom signed for Belgian side OH Leuven U23.

== International career ==
He played for the Thailand national under-23 football team.

== Style of play ==
Rattanapoom mainly operates as a midfielder. He is left-footed.

== Personal life ==
Rattanapoom has enjoyed playing video games and listening to hip-hop.
