= Wasusiwakit Phusirit =

Thai footballer (born 1992)

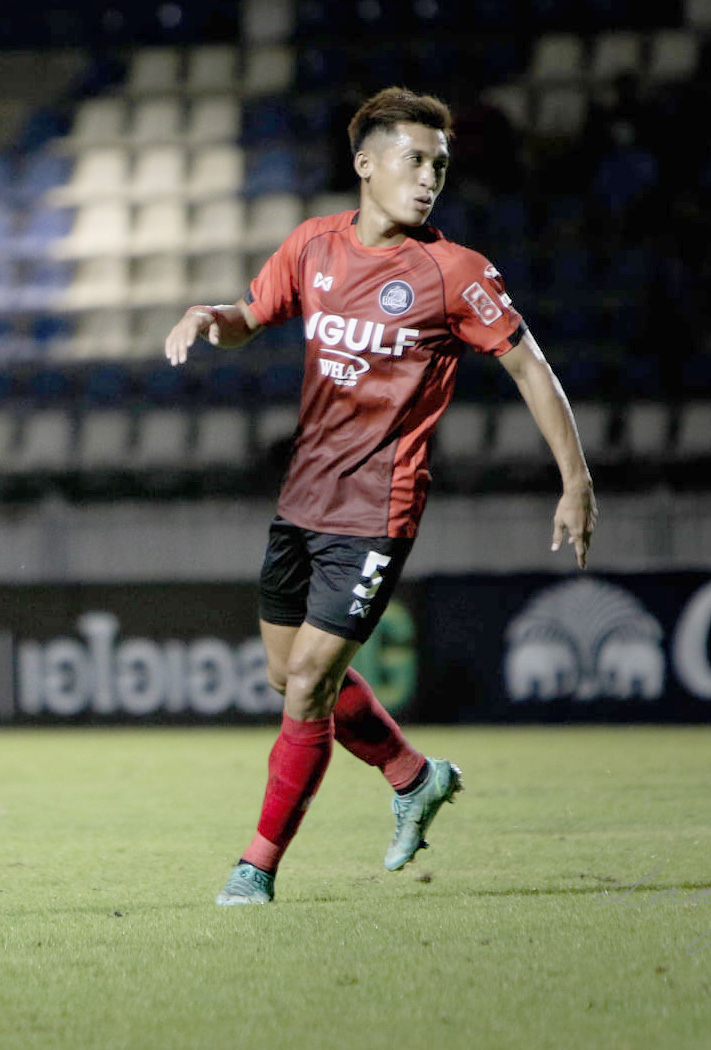
- Wasusiwakit Phusirit playing for Rayong.

Personal information
- Full name: Wasusiwakit Phusirit
- Date of birth: 27 May 1992 (age 34)
- Place of birth: Khon Kaen, Thailand
- Position: Right-back

Team information
- Current team: Khon Kaen United

Senior career*
Years	Team	Apps	(Gls)
2012-2014	Sukhothai		
2015–2026	Rayong	199	(1)
2026–	Khon Kaen United	0	(0)
- * Club domestic league appearances and goals as of 9 July 2026

Wasusiwakit Phusirit (Thai: วสุศิวกิจ ภูสีฤทธิ์; born June 27, 1992) is a Thai professional footballer who plays as a right-back for Thai League 2 club Khon Kaen United. In the 2020/2021 season he started 25 games for Rayong FC.
