= Makoto Teguramori =

Japanese footballer and manager

Makoto Teguramori 手倉森 誠
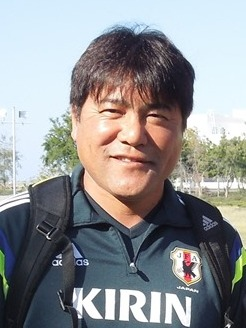
- Teguramori with Japan U23 in 2014

Personal information
- Full name: Makoto Teguramori
- Date of birth: 14 November 1967 (age 58)
- Place of birth: Gonohe, Aomori, Japan
- Height: 1.74 m (5 ft 8 1/2 in)
- Position: Midfielder

Youth career
- 1983–1985: Gonohe High School

Senior career*
Years	Team	Apps	(Gls)
1986–1992	Kashima Antlers		
1993–1999	NEC Yamagata		

Managerial career
- 2008–2013: Vegalta Sendai
- 2014–2016: Japan U23
- 2017–2018: Japan (assistant)
- 2019–2020: V-Varen Nagasaki
- 2021: Vegalta Sendai
- 2022: BG Pathum United
- 2023: Chonburi
- 2023–2024: BG Pathum United
- 2025: Hà Nội
Medal record
Men's football
Representing Japan (as manager)
AFC U-23 Championship
Winner	2016
- * Club domestic league appearances and goals

Makoto Teguramori (手倉森 誠, Teguramori Makoto; born November 14, 1967) is a Japanese professional football manager and former player who was recently the head coach of V.League 1 club Hà Nội.

== Playing career ==
Teguramori was born in Gonohe, Aomori on November 14, 1967. After graduating from high school, he joined Sumitomo Metal (later Kashima Antlers) in 1986. The club won the 2nd place in 1987 JSL Cup. In 1993, he moved to NEC Yamagata (later Montedio Yamagata). He retired in 1995.

== Managerial career ==
=== Until 2003 ===
After his retirement from playing, Teguramori started coaching career at Montedio Yamagata in 1996. He served as assistant coach until 2000. In 2001, he moved to Oita Trinita and served as physical coach and assistant coach until 2003.

=== Vegalta Sendai ===
In 2004, Teguramori moved to Vegalta Sendai and became a coach. In 2008, he became a manager first time in his career. In 2008 season, Vegalta finished the 3rd place in J2 League. In 2009 season, Vegalta won the champions and was promoted to J1 League. Immediately after the opening 2011 season, 2011 Tōhoku earthquake and tsunami occurred in Sendai. However Vegalta finished at the 4th place in 2011 season which is best place in the club history. In 2012 season, Vegalta won the 2nd place and qualified for 2013 AFC Champions League. He resigned with Vegalta end of 2013 season to be the manager of Japan U-23 national team for 2016 Summer Olympics.

=== Japan national team ===
In 2014, Teguramori became a manager for Japan U-23 national team and assistant coach for Japan national team. In 2016 AFC U-23 Championship held in Qatar, he managed Japan U-23 to win the Asian U-23 tournament for the first time, thus qualifying to join 2016 Summer Olympics as the champions of Asia. In 2016 Summer Olympics, he and his U-23 men obtained as many as four points at the group stage, nonetheless ending up at only the third place behind Nigeria and Colombia in Group B. This was not sufficient for them to qualify to the next stage.

=== V-Varen Nagasaki ===
In February 2019, Teguramori signed with J2 League club V-Varen Nagasaki.

=== Vegalta Sendai ===
In February 2021, Teguramori signed with J1 League club Vegalta Sendai.

=== BG Pathum United ===
On 27 January 2022, BG Pathum United hired Teguramori as head coach. He was fired in October of that same year for "failing to meet the club's target." He has helped the club to win the 2022 Thailand Champions Cup.

=== Chonburi ===
On 13 May 2023, Thai League 1 club Chonburi hired Teguramori as their head coach.

=== Return to BG Pathum United ===
On 25 December 2023, he made a comeback to BG Pathum United in the second leg of the 2023–24 season, with the aim of winning one of the remaining domestic competitions. On 16 June 2024, Teguramori led BG Pathum United to win the first Thai League Cup title in their history, after a 1–0 win over Muangthong United in the final. However, he parted ways with The Rabbits on 8 October, after a disappointing run in the beginning of the 2024–25 season.

=== Hà Nội ===
On 17 February 2025, V.League 1 club Hà Nội announced they had appointed Teguramori as new head coach. In his first season at Hanoi FC, he led the club to the second place in the league. On 10 July 2025, the club extended his contract to one year.

== Club statistics ==
Club performance			League		Cup		League Cup		Total	
Season	Club	League	Apps	Goals	Apps	Goals	Apps	Goals	Apps	Goals
Japan			League		Emperor's Cup		J.League Cup		Total	
1986/87	Sumitomo Metal	JSL Division 2								
1987/88	Sumitomo Metal	JSL Division 1	4	0			4	4	8	4
1988/89	Sumitomo Metal	JSL Division 1	11	0			2	2	13	2
1989/90	Sumitomo Metal	JSL Division 2	20	3			0	0	20	3
1990/91	Sumitomo Metal	JSL Division 2	9	1			1	0	10	1
1991/92	Sumitomo Metal	JSL Division 2	5	0			1	0	6	0
1992	Kashima Antlers	J1 League	-		0	0	0	0	0	0
Total			49	4	0	0	8	6	57	10

== Managerial statistics ==
As of 16 September 2025

Managerial record by team and tenure
Team	Nat.	From	To	Record					Ref.
Team	Nat.	From	To	G	W	D	L	Win %	Ref.
Vegalta Sendai	(Japan)	1 February 2008	31 January 2014	276	120	85	71	43.48	
Japan U23	(Japan)	1 February 2014	21 August 2016	15	10	1	4	66.67	
V-Varen Nagasaki	(Japan)	1 February 2019	31 January 2021	97	46	19	32	47.42	
Vegalta Sendai	(Japan)	1 February 2021	22 November 2021	43	7	12	24	16.28	
BG Pathum United	(Thailand)	27 January 2022	24 October 2022	28	17	6	5	60.71	
Chonburi	(Thailand)	13 May 2023	7 December 2023	13	4	4	5	30.77	
BG Pathum United	(Thailand)	25 December 2023	8 October 2024	29	16	7	6	55.17	
Hanoi FC	(Vietnam)	17 February 2025	16 September 2025	17	9	3	5	52.94	
Career Total				519	229	138	152	44.12	

== Honours ==
=== Manager ===
Vegalta Sendai

- J.League Division 2: 2009

Japan U-23

- AFC U-23 Championship: 2016

BG Pathum United

- Thai League Cup: 2023–24
- Thailand Champions Cup: 2022

=== Individual ===
- Thai League 1 Coach of the Month: April 2022, May 2024
