= Uthai Thani F.C. =

Thai football club

Uthai Thani อุทัยธานี เอฟซี
- Full name: Uthai Thani Football Club สโมสรฟุตบอลจังหวัดอุทัยธานี
- Nicknames: The Elephants (ช้างป่าห้วยขาแข้ง)
- Founded: 1937; 89 years ago as Royal Thai Air Force Football Club; 2020; 6 years ago as Uthai Thani Football Club
- Ground: Uthai Thani Province Stadium; Uthai Thani, Thailand
- Capacity: 4,477
- Chairman: Chada Thaiseth
- Head coach: Alexandre Gama
- League: Thai League 1
- 2025–26: Thai League 1, 11th of 16
- Website: uthai-thani-fc.com
Home colours	Away colours

Uthai Thani Football Club (Thai: สโมสรฟุตบอลจังหวัดอุทัยธานี) is a Thai professional association football club based in Uthai Thani province. The club currently plays in the Thai League 1.

The club was formed in 1937 as the Royal Thai Air Force Football Club; it was rebranded as the Uthai Thani Football Club at the end of the 2019 season, following the owner's decision to change the club's name and relocate to Uthai Thani.

== History ==
Uthai Thani started off their debut season as a rebranded team in the 2020–21 season, however, the club then sees themselves relegated to the Thai League 3 sitting in 17th place in the league.

In the 2020–21 season, Uthai Thani bounced back after their inaugural seasons by winning the 2021–22 Thai League 3 Northern Region and also winning the 2021–22 Thai League 3 title after defeating Krabi 3–1 in the final thus gaining promotion back to the second division.

In the 2022–23 season, Uthai Thani finished in third place where they qualified for the promotion play-offs whereby Brazilian player Ricardo Santos scored 30 league goals in two consecutive season. Uthai Thani then faced off against Suphanburi in the semi-finals where they won 5–4 on aggregate thus advancing to the final. In the final, Uthai Thani met Customs United where Uthai Thani came out victorious in a 5–2 aggregate won. This win sees Uthai Thani qualified to the top flight for the first time as a rebranded team history.

Uthai Thani then started off their top flight campaign in the 2023–24 Thai League 1 where they finished in 7th place.

== Stadium ==
15°23′40″N 100°01′01″E	Uthai Thani	Uthai Thani Province Stadium	4,477	2010–2013
15°46′02″N 99°48′00″E	Nakhon Sawan	Latyaowitthayakhom School	800	2013
15°23′40″N 100°01′01″E	Uthai Thani	Uthai Thani Province Stadium	4,477	2014–present

== Season by season record ==
Season										FA Cup	League Cup	Top goalscorer	
Season	Division	P	W	D	L	F	A	Pts	Pos	FA Cup	League Cup	Name	Goals
New era after takeover Air Force United and renamed to Uthai Thani
2020–21	T2	34	5	10	19	34	53	25	17th	QR	–	Phattharaphon Jansuwan	6
2021–22	T3 North	22	18	2	2	63	11	56	1st	QF	QF	Ricardo Santos	30
2022–23	T2	34	16	11	7	70	36	59	3rd	R4	R1	Ricardo Santos	30
2023–24	T1	30	9	8	13	39	55	35	7th	R1	R2	Ricardo Santos	16
2024–25	T1	30	9	10	11	37	35	37	9th	R1	QF	Ricardo Santos; Ben Davis	7
2025–26	T1	30	7	10	13	39	44	31	11th	R2	R2	Mohamed Eisa	10

Champions	Runners-up	Promoted	Relegated

- P = Played
- W = Games won
- D = Games drawn
- L = Games lost
- F = Goals for
- A = Goals against
- Pts = Points
- Pos = Final position
- T1 = Thai League 1
- T2 = Thai League 2
- T3 = Thai League 3
- QR1 = First Qualifying Round
- QR2 = Second Qualifying Round
- QR3 = Third Qualifying Round
- QR4 = Fourth Qualifying Round
- RInt = Intermediate Round
- R1 = Round 1
- R2 = Round 2
- R3 = Round 3
- R4 = Round 4
- R5 = Round 5
- R6 = Round 6
- GS = Group stage
- QF = Quarter-finals
- SF = Semi-finals
- RU = Runners-up
- S = Shared
- W = Winners

== Players ==
=== First-team squad ===
As of 6 August 2026

Note: Flags indicate national team as defined under FIFA eligibility rules; some limited exceptions apply. Players may hold more than one non-FIFA nationality.

No.	Pos.	Nation	Player
1	GK	THA	Chirawat Wangthaphan
2	DF	COL	Jaime Giraldo
3	DF	THA	Charalampos Charalampous
4	DF	THA	Possawee Muanmart
5	DF	THA	Suporn Peenagatapho
6	MF	BRA	Pablo Dias
7	FW	MLT	Trent Buhagiar
8	MF	THA	William Weidersjö (Captain)
9	FW	JPN	Itsuki Enomoto
10	MF	THA	Ben Davis
11	MF	THA	Sumanya Purisai
13	DF	KOR	Jeong Tae-wook
17	MF	THA	Jakkit Wachpirom
18	GK	THA	Boonyakait Wongsajaem
19	MF	THA	Wattana Playnum
20	FW	THA	Nonthaphat Naksawad

No.	Pos.	Nation	Player
21	MF	THA	Sirimongkol Rattanapoom
22	FW	BRA	Kelvin Oliveira
24	DF	THA	Santipap Yaemsaen
25	MF	THA	Ratthanakorn Maikami
26	GK	THA	Chommaphat Boonloet
29	FW	THA	Arthit Boodjinda
35	FW	THA	Siroch Chatthong
62	MF	THA	Airfan Doloh (on loan from BG Pathum United)
65	DF	THA	Thitathorn Aksornsri
77	MF	BRA	Roberthinho
88	FW	THA	Amornthep Maundee
91	FW	BRA	Julio Vitor
92	MF	THA	Atikun Mheetuam
95	GK	THA	Teerasak Phukab
97	GK	BRA	Caíque
99	FW	BRA	Willian Lira

=== Out on loan ===
Note: Flags indicate national team as defined under FIFA eligibility rules; some limited exceptions apply. Players may hold more than one non-FIFA nationality.

No.	Pos.	Nation	Player
3	DF	THA	Charalampos Charalampous (at (Thailand) Nakhon Ratchasima)
13	MF	THA	Kittisak Putchan (at (Thailand) Nakhon Pathom United)

No.	Pos.	Nation	Player
15	DF	THA	Wattana Klomjit (at (Thailand) Kanchanaburi Power)
31	GK	THA	Teerasak Phukab (at (Thailand) Nakhon Sawan See Khwae City)

== Honours ==
=== League ===
- Thai League 3
  - Champions (1): 2021–22
- Thai League 3 Northern Region
  - Champions (1): 2021–22

== Managerial history ==
Name	Period	Honours
Thanaset Amornsinkittichote	2019–2020	
Therdsak Chaiman	2020	
Masayuki Miura	2021	
Worachai Surinsirirat	2021	
Therdsak Chaiman (2)	2021–2022	– 2021–22 Thai League 3
Somchai Makmool	2022	
Pattarapol Naprasert	2022–2023	
Jukkapant Punpee	2023	
Mikael Stahre	2023–2024	
Jukkapant Punpee (2)	2024	
Miloš Joksić	2024–2025	
Gino Lettieri	2025	
Miloš Joksić (2)	2025–2026	
Alexandre Gama	2026–present	
