= Patipat Rorbru =

Thai footballer and coach (born 1981)

Patipat Robroo
Personal information
- Full name: Patipat Robroo
- Date of birth: 3 June 1981 (age 45)
- Place of birth: Khon Kaen, Thailand
- Height: 1.76 m (5 ft 9 1/2 in)
- Position: Defender

Senior career*
Years	Team	Apps	(Gls)
2004–2008	Port Authority	97	(6)
2009	Samut Songkhram	10	(0)
Total		107	(6)

Managerial career
- 2019: Khon Kaen United
- 2021: Khon Kaen United
- 2022–2023: Khon Kaen United
- 2024: Chiangmai
- 2024–2025: Khon Kaen United
- * Club domestic league appearances and goals

Patipat Robroo (Thai: ปฎิภัทร รอบรู้) is a Thai football coach and former player, who was most recently the head coach of Thai League 2 club Khon Kaen United.

He played for Thailand Premier League clubside Samut Songkhram FC.

== Managerial statistics ==
As of match played 27 April 2025

Managerial record by team and tenure
Team	Nat	From	To	Record							
Team	Nat	From	To	G	W	D	L	GF	GA	GD	Win %
Khon Kaen United	(Thailand)	8 March 2021	9 May 2021	11	5	0	6	11	15	−4	45.45
Khon Kaen United	(Thailand)	4 December 2022	23 October 2023	24	7	7	10	26	43	−17	29.17
Chiangmai	(Thailand)	8 January 2024	20 February 2024	7	3	0	4	8	8	+0	42.86
Khon Kaen United	(Thailand)	7 December 2024	31 May 2025	16	3	2	11	17	46	−29	18.75
Career Total				58	18	9	31	62	112	−50	31.03

== Honours ==
=== Manager ===
Khon Kaen United

- Thai League 3: 2019

Individual

- Thai League 3 Coach of the Year: 2019
