= Khon Kaen United F.C. =

Thai football club

Khon Kaen United ขอนแก่น ยูไนเต็ด
- Full name: Khon Kaen United Football Club สโมสรฟุตบอลขอนแก่น ยูไนเต็ด
- Nicknames: The King Cobras (จงอางผยอง)
- Founded: 13 October 2014; 12 years ago
- Ground: Khon Kaen Provincial Administrative Organization Stadium; Khon Kaen, Thailand
- Capacity: 6,500
- Chairman: Watthana Changlao
- Head coach: Supachai Komsilp
- League: Thai League 2
- 2025–26: Thai League 2, 7th of 18
Home colours	Away colours	Third colours

Khon Kaen United Football Club (Thai: สโมสรฟุตบอลขอนแก่น ยูไนเต็ด) is a Thai professional football club based in Khon Kaen province. The club currently plays in Thai League 2, the second tier of the Thai football league system. The club has won the Thai League 3 title in 2019.

== History ==
Khon Kaen United was formed in 2015 and entered the Regional League Division 2 and allocated into the North-East Division that makes Khon Kaen Derby match with Khon Kaen.

=== Suspended ===
In 2016, Khon Kaen United was suspended from the 2016 campaign due to criminal case with 8 games remaining.In 2018, Khon Kaen United returned to play in the Thailand's professional league because the team is acquitted by the Thailand Court of justice decide. FA Thailand order this team to restart at 2018 Thai League 4 North Eastern Region. At the end of the season the club finished with Runners-up of Thai League 4 and promoted to the Thai League 3.

=== Back-to-back promotion to the top flight league ===
In 2019, Khon Kaen United was the champion of the 2019 Thai League 3 upper zone and champion of Thai League 3 where the club got promoted from Thai League 3 to the 2020–21 Thai League 2 where in their first season, the club gain another promotion to the 2021–22 Thai League 1 as a play-off winner after beating Nakhon Pathom United 4–3 on penalties shootout.

=== Relegation ===
Khon Kaen United finished in the 2024–25 season sitting in the bottom of the league with 18 points thus getting relegated to the Thai League 2.

== Kit suppliers and shirt sponsors ==
Year	Kit manufacturer	Main sponsor
2015	(Thailand) Kool Sports	No sponsor
2016	In house production	(Thailand) Chang
2019	(Thailand) Super Sport	(Thailand) Leo
2020–2022	(Thailand) Ocel	(Thailand) Leo
2022–2025	(Italy) Kappa	(Thailand) Mitr Phol
2025–present	(Thailand) Ego Sport	(Thailand) Bangchak

== Stadium ==
Coordinates	Location	Stadium	Capacity	Year
16°27′21″N 102°56′49″E	Khon Kaen	Khon Kaen Sports School Stadium	2,500	2015
16°24′46″N 102°49′38″E	Khon Kaen	Khon Kaen Provincial Administrative Organization Stadium	7,000	2016–present

== Players ==
=== Current squad ===
Note: Flags indicate national team as defined under FIFA eligibility rules; some limited exceptions apply. Players may hold more than one non-FIFA nationality.

No.	Pos.	Nation	Player
2	DF	THA	Jakkapong Sanmahung
5	DF	THA	Wasusiwakit Phusirit
7	MF	THA	Veeraphong Aon-pean
10	FW	BRA	Rosalvo
13	DF	JPN	Shunya Suganuma
14	MF	THA	Worrarit Mungkhum
16	MF	THA	Yotsakorn Natthasit (on loan from Chonburi)
17	DF	THA	Panupong Hansuri
18	GK	THA	Phongsanat Chamnaphon
19	DF	KOR	Kwon Dae-hee
20	DF	THA	Suwit Paipromrat

No.	Pos.	Nation	Player
21	MF	THA	Pongsaphak Tangsup
22	DF	THA	Jiradet Taichankong
24	DF	THA	Kittipat Inthawong
29	GK	THA	Natthapat Makthuam
33	MF	THA	Phanuphong Phonsa
41	DF	THA	Kittichai Yaidee
54	FW	THA	Phalitchok Chitsompong
64	MF	THA	Thanawin Inthamma
77	FW	THA	Kittitee Montree
81	MF	CIV	Amadou Ouattara
92	FW	THA	Chitsanupong Choti
99	GK	THA	Phiyawat Intarapim

=== Player out on loan ===
Note: Flags indicate national team as defined under FIFA eligibility rules; some limited exceptions apply. Players may hold more than one non-FIFA nationality.

No.	Pos.	Nation	Player

== Honours ==
=== Domestic competitions ===
==== League ====
- Thai League 3

(gold) Winners : 2019

- Thai League 3 Upper Region

(gold) Winners : 2019

- Thai League 4

(silver) Runners-up : 2018

- Regional League North-East Division:

(gold) Champions (1): 2015

== Player records ==
As of 30 January 2026.

- Biggest wins: 5–0 vs Nong Kai (30 October 2025)
- Heaviest defeats: 9–0 vs Buriram United (19 January 2025)
- Youngest goal scorers: Phongsakon Sangkasopha ~ 19 years 11 days old (On 30 October 2025 vs Nong Kai)
- Oldest goal scorers: Tawin Butsombat ~ 37 years 9 months 15 days old (On 6 April 2025 vs Ratchaburi)
- Youngest ever debutant: Chetsadaporn Makkharom ~ 18 years 3 months 3 days old (On 27 October 2021 vs Rayong)
- Oldest ever player: Phiyawat Intarapim ~ 37 years 10 months 5 days old (On 24 January 2026 vs Sisaket United)

== Former players ==
=== International capped players ===
AFC/OFC.: (Malaysia) Liridon Krasniqi; (Palestine) Yashir Islame; (Philippines) Joshua Grommen; (South Korea) Ryu Seung-woo	CAF.: (Ivory Coast) Dagno Siaka; (Guinea-Bissau) Steve Ambri	UEFA.: (Israel) Lidor Cohen	CONMEBOL/ CONCACAF.: (Brazil) Cláudio; (Martinique) Steeven Langil

== Managerial history ==
Head coaches by years (2015–present)

- (Thailand) Thongchai Sukkoki 2015–2016
- (England) Dave Booth 2016
- (Serbia) Ljubomir Ristovski 2016
- (Thailand) Apichai Pholpitak 2018
- (Thailand) Sarayuth Chaikamdee 2018–2019
- (Thailand) Patipat Robroo 2019
- (Japan) Sugao Kambe 2020–2021
- (Thailand) Patipat Robroo 2021
- (Brazil) Carlos Eduardo Parreira 2021–2022
- (Thailand) Pairoj Borwonwatanadilok 2022
- (Thailand) Patipat Robroo 2022–2023
- (Thailand) Ekalak Thong-am 2023–2024
- (Thailand) Tana Chanabut 2024
- (Thailand) Rattee Ueathanaphaisarn 2024
- (Serbia) Srdan Trailovic 2024
- (Thailand) Patipat Robroo 2024–2025
- (Thailand) Pipob On-Mo 2025
- (Thailand) Teerasak Po-on 2025–2026
- (Thailand) Supachai Komsilp 2026–present

== Season by season record ==
Season	League									FA Cup	League Cup	Top goalscorer	
Season	Division	P	W	D	L	F	A	Pts	Pos	FA Cup	League Cup	Name	Goals
2015	DIV 2 North-East	34	26	4	4	69	28	82	1st	R2	QF	(Ghana) Samuel Kwawu	13
2016–17	DIV 1	Banned											
2018	T4 North-East	26	17	5	4	65	24	56	2nd	QR	QR1	(Brazil) Capistrano Jardel	15+5
2019	T3 Upper	24	18	5	1	57	19	59	1st	QR	QR1	(Brazil) Natan Oliveira	19
2020–21	T2	34	18	6	10	56	37	60	4th	QR	–	(Brazil) Paulo Conrado	25+1
2021–22	T1	30	10	7	13	30	43	37	10th	R2	R1	(Brazil) Ibson Melo	17
2022–23	T1	30	7	12	11	24	42	33	13th	R2	R1	(Thailand) Alongkorn Jornnathong (Brazil) Ibson Melo (Israel) Lidor Cohen	4
2023–24	T1	30	8	11	11	44	58	35	8th	R1	QF	(Brazil) Brenner	9
2024–25	T1	30	4	6	20	21	68	18	16th	R1	R2	(South Korea) Ryu Seung-woo	4
2025–26	T2	34	11	12	11	60	52	45	7th	QF	QF	(Thailand) Arthit Boodjinda	18

Champions	Runners-up	Promoted	Relegated
