= Chirawat Wangthaphan =

Thai footballer

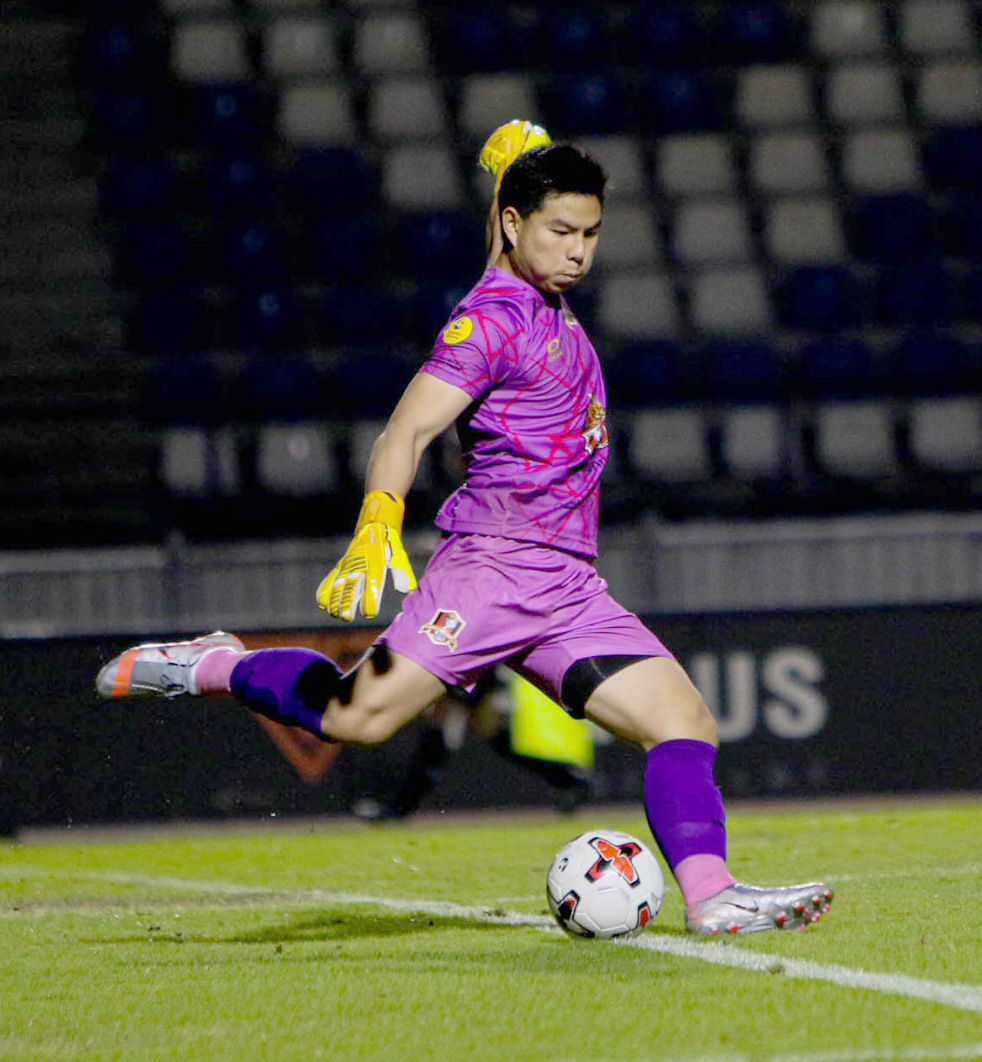

Personal information
- Full name: Chirawat Wangthaphan
- Date of birth: 26 July 1998 (age 28)
- Place of birth: Khon Kaen, Thailand
- Height: 1.80 m (5 ft 11 in)
- Position: Goalkeeper

Team information
- Current team: Uthai Thani
- Number: 1

Youth career
- 2015–2016: Khon Kaen United

Senior career*
Years	Team	Apps	(Gls)
2017–2025	Khon Kaen United	165	(0)
2017	→ Kalasin (loan)	10	(0)
2025-	Uthai Thani	29	(0)
- * Club domestic league appearances and goals ‡ National team caps and goals as of 7 August 2026

Chirawat Wangthaphan (Thai: จิรวัฒน์ วังทะพันธ์, born 26 July 1998) is a Thai professional footballer who plays as a goalkeeper for Thai League 1 club Uthai Thani.

== International career ==
In 2023, he was called up by Thailand national team for 2023 King's Cup, but did not make an appearance.

== Honours ==
=== Club ===
Khon Kaen United

- Thai League 3: 2019
