= Deivy Balanta =

Colombian footballer (born 1993)

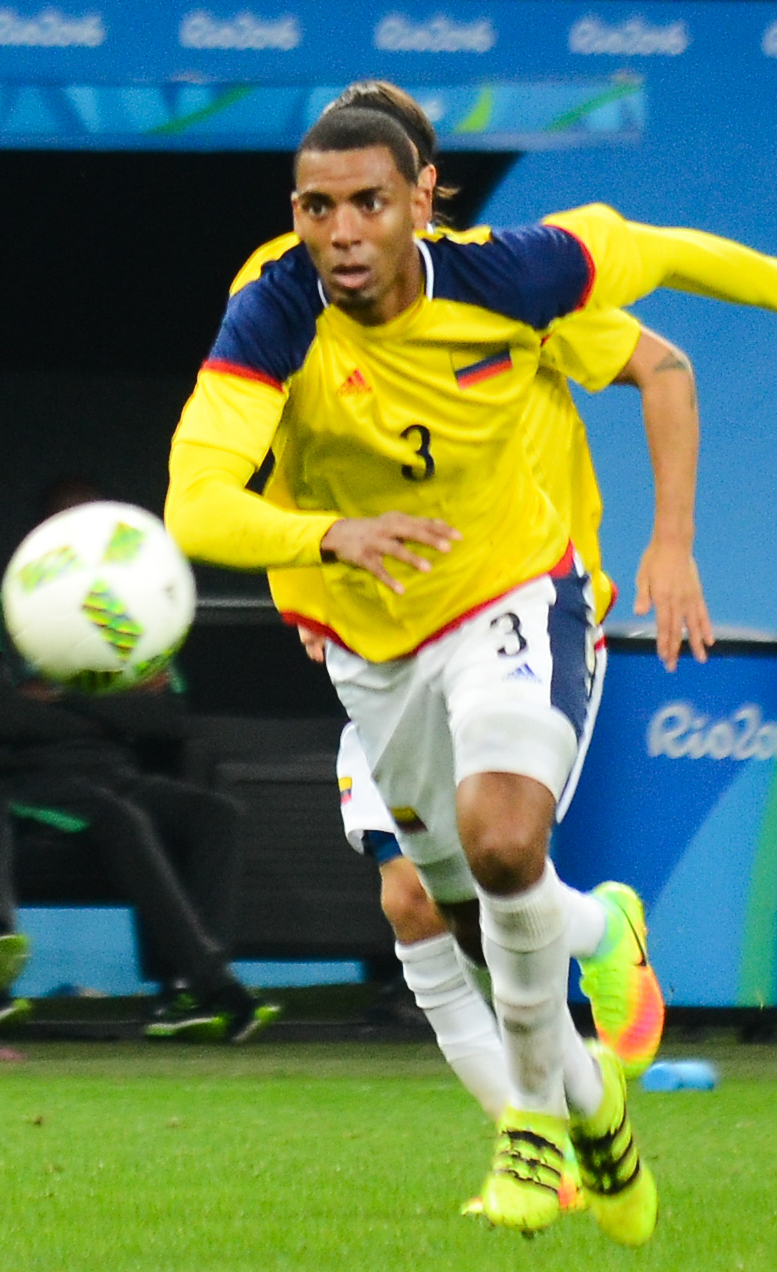
- Balanta at the 2016 Olympics

Personal information
- Full name: Deivy Alexander Balanta Abonía
- Date of birth: 2 September 1993 (age 33)
- Place of birth: Bogotá, Colombia
- Height: 1.84 m (6 ft 0 in)
- Position: Centre back

Team information
- Current team: Honduras Progreso
- Number: 3

Youth career
- –2010: Atlético Nacional

Senior career*
Years	Team	Apps	(Gls)
2010–2011	Atlético Nacional	0	(0)
2011–2012	→ All Boys (loan)	0	(0)
2012–2016	Alianza Petrolera	72	(1)
2016–2019	Atlético Junior	50	(0)
2019–2021	→ Millonarios (loan)	10	(0)
2021–2022	Once Caldas	14	(0)
2023–	Honduras Progreso	0	(0)

International career
2013	Colombia U20	13	(0)
2015–2016	Colombia Olympic	8	(0)
- * Club domestic league appearances and goals as of 21:13, 27 July 2023 (UTC)

Deivy Alexander Balanta Abonía (born 2 September 1993) is a Colombian footballer who plays as a central defender for Liga Nacional club Honduras Progreso.

== Career ==
Balanta started his youth career with Atlético Nacional. He was loaned to All Boys in Argentina, but did not feature with the Argentine Primera División club.

Balanta joined Alianza Petrolera on 8 July 2012. He achieved promotion with Alianza Petrolera by winning the 2012 Categoría Primera B. He was called up to represent Colombia at the 2013 South American Youth Football Championship and the 2013 FIFA U-20 World Cup.

On 6 January 2016, Balanta joined Atlético Junior. In July 2016, he extended his contract with the Barranquilla team. He was also called up to represent Colombia at the 2016 Summer Olympics. Balanta contract was not extended, and he became a free agent in June 2019.

On 17 July 2019, Balanta joined Millonarios on loan for one year.

On 7 January 2021, Balanta joined Once Caldas.

In December 2022, Balanta joined Honduran club Honduras Progreso.

== Career statistics ==
=== Club statistics ===
As of 23 October 2023

Appearances and goals by club, season and competition
Club	Season	League			National Cup		Continental (Note: Appearances in Copa Libertadores and Copa Sudamericana)		Total	
Club	Season	Division	Apps	Goals	Apps	Goals	Apps	Goals	Apps	Goals
Alianza Petrolera	2012	Categoría Primera B	13	0	0	0	—		13	0
Alianza Petrolera	2013	Categoría Primera A	12	0	7	0	—		19	0
Alianza Petrolera	2014	Categoría Primera A	27	0	2	0	—		29	0
Alianza Petrolera	2015	Categoría Primera A	20	1	4	0	—		24	1
Alianza Petrolera	Total		72	1	13	0	0	0	85	1
Junior	2016	Categoría Primera A	19	0	4	0	6	0	29	0
Junior	2017	Categoría Primera A	13	0	6	0	5	0	24	0
Junior	2018	Categoría Primera A	13	0	1	0	2	0	16	0
Junior	2019	Categoría Primera A	5	0	1	0	0	0	6	0
Junior	Total		50	0	12	0	13	0	75	0
Millonarios (loan)	2019	Categoría Primera A	10	0	0	0	—		10	0
Millonarios (loan)	2020	Categoría Primera A	0	0	0	0	—		0	0
Millonarios (loan)	Total		10	0	0	0	0	0	10	0
Once Caldas	2021	Categoría Primera A	15	0	0	0	—		15	0
Once Caldas	2022	Categoría Primera A	0	0	0	0	—		0	0
Once Caldas	Total		15	0	0	0	0	0	15	0
Honduras Progreso	2022–23	Liga Nacional	0	0	0	0	—		0	0
Career total			147	1	25	0	13	0	185	1
