= Supachai Komsilp =

Thai footballer (born 1980)

Personal information
- Full name: Supachai Komsilp
- Date of birth: 18 February 1980 (age 46)
- Place of birth: Surat Thani, Thailand
- Height: 1.77 m (5 ft 9 1/2 in)
- Position: Left back

Team information
- Current team: Khon Kaen United (head coach)

Youth career
- 2002: Krung Thai Bank

Senior career*
Years	Team	Apps	(Gls)
2003–2012	Bangkok Glass	148	(13)
2013	Chiangrai United	24	(0)
2014–2017	Bangkok Glass	52	(2)
Total		224	(15)

International career
2011–2013	Thailand	10	(0)

Managerial career
- 2018–2022: Bangkok Glass (assistant)
- 2022: Rajpracha
- 2022–2023: Chiangmai (assistant)
- 2023: BG Pathum United (assistant)
- 2023: BG Pathum United (interim)
- 2023–2024: Chanthaburi
- 2025: BG Pathum United (assistant)
- 2025: BG Pathum United (interim)
- 2025: BG Pathum United
- 2025–2026: Bangkok
- 2026–: Khon Kaen United
- * Club domestic league appearances and goals as of 23:56, 18 November 2017 (UTC)

Supachai Komsilp (Thai: ศุภชัย คมศิลป์; born February 18, 1980) is a Thai professional football manager and former player. He is currently the head coach of Thai League 2 club Khon Kaen United.

== International career ==
Supachai was called up to the national team, in coach Winfried Schäfer first squad selection for the 2014 FIFA World Cup qualification.

== Coaching career ==
=== Bangkok ===
On 15 December 2025, Supachai was announced as the new head coach of Bangkok in Thai League 2. On 20 December 2025, Supachai won his first game in charge of Bangkok, with a 1-0 home victory over Songkla in the Thai League 2.

=== Khonkaen United ===
On 2 June 2026, Khon Kaen United confirmed the appointment of Supachai as head replace outgoing manager Teerasak Po-on.

== Managerial statistics ==
As of match played 22 November 2026

Managerial record by team and tenure
Team	Nat.	From	To	Record								Ref.
Team	Nat.	From	To	G	W	D	L	GF	GA	GD	Win %	Ref.
Rajpracha	(Thailand)	22 February 2022	31 May 2022	10	4	1	5	15	11	+4	40.00	
BG Pathum United (interim)	(Thailand)	19 March 2023	8 May 2023	6	4	0	2	13	9	+4	66.67	
Chanthaburi	(Thailand)	10 December 2023	31 December 2024	40	16	11	13	54	44	+10	40.00	
BG Pathum United (interim)	(Thailand)	16 January 2025	2 February 2025	6	4	1	1	14	5	+9	66.67	
BG Pathum United	(Thailand)	5 April 2025	2 October 2025	20	8	5	7	30	29	+1	40.00	
Bangkok	(Thailand)	15 December 2025	29 April 2026	19	6	4	9	22	33	−11	31.58	
Khon Kaen United	(Thailand)	2 June 2026	Present	14	11	1	2	28	11	+17	78.57	
Career Total				115	53	23	39	176	142	+34	46.09	—

== Honours ==
=== Player ===
Bangkok Glass

- Thai FA Cup (1) : 2014
- Singapore Cup (1): 2010
