= 2025–26 Thai League 3 National Championship =

Thai League 3 National Championship
- Season: 2025–26
- Dates: 18 April 2026 – 14 June 2026

The 2025–26 Thai League 3 National Championship is the concluding phase of the 2025–26 Thai League 3. It determines the national champion of Thailand's third-tier professional football league and the three clubs that will earn promotion to Thai League 2 for the 2026–27 season. This stage features 12 clubs, consisting of the champions and runners-up from the six regional groups. These clubs compete in a two-phase format: a group stage followed by a knockout stage. The competition begins on 18 April 2026 and concludes with the final's second leg on 14 June 2026.

== Teams ==
Locations of the 2025–26 Thai League 3 National Championship Teams
Group A
Group B
Group C

The following 12 clubs qualified for the 2025–26 Thai League 3 National Championship by securing either first or second place in their respective regional groups during the Regional Stage:

Team	Qualifying method
Uttaradit	Northern region champions
Chiangmai	Northern region runners-up
Prime Bangkok	Central region champions
North Bangkok University	Central region runners-up
Muang Loei United	Northeastern region champions
Udon United	Northeastern region runners-up
Fleet	Eastern region champions
Burapha United	Eastern region runners-up
Samut Sakhon City	Western region champions
Thonburi United	Western region runners-up
Nara United	Southern region champions
PT Satun	Southern region runners-up

Locations of teams in Bangkok Metropolitan region

=== Stadiums and locations ===
Team	Location	Stadium	Coordinates
Burapha United	Chonburi (Ban Bueng)	Banbueng Town Municipality Stadium	13°19′06″N 101°06′59″E
Chiangmai	Chiang Mai (Mueang)	Chiangmai City Municipality Stadium	18°48′03″N 98°59′22″E
Fleet	Chonburi (Sattahip)	Battleship Stadium	12°39′38″N 100°55′25″E
Muang Loei United	Loei (Mueang)	Loei Provincial Stadium	17°29′09″N 101°44′06″E
Nara United	Narathiwat (Mueang)	Narathiwat PAO. Stadium	6°25′31″N 101°48′23″E
North Bangkok University	Pathum Thani (Thanyaburi)	Stadium of North Bangkok University	14°00′22″N 100°40′24″E
Prime Bangkok	Bangkok (Lak Si)	NT Stadium	13°53′03″N 100°34′37″E
PT Satun	Satun (Mueang)	Satun PAO. Stadium	6°39′05″N 100°04′44″E
Samut Sakhon City	Samut Sakhon (Mueang)	Stadium of Thailand National Sports University, Samut Sakhon Campus	13°32′30″N 100°16′52″E
Thonburi United	Bangkok (Nong Khaem)	Thonburi Stadium	13°43′28″N 100°20′43″E
Udon United	Udon Thani (Mueang)	Stadium of Thailand National Sports University, Udon Thani Campus	17°24′20″N 102°46′09″E
Uttaradit	Uttaradit (Mueang)	Uttaradit Provincial Stadium	17°36′34″N 100°06′39″E

== Group stage ==
Each group competes in a round-robin format, with home-and-away matches determining the final standings. The top club from each group and the best second-placed club across all groups qualify for the knockout stage.

=== Group A ===
Pos	Team	Pld	W	D	L	GF	GA	GD	Pts	Qualification	UTD	PBK	NBU	CMI
1	Uttaradit (Q)	6	3	2	1	10	8	+2	11	Advance to knockout stage	—	2–2	2–1	2–1
2	Prime Bangkok	6	3	1	2	14	9	+5	10		2–1	—	3–0	0–1
3	North Bangkok University	6	2	1	3	7	9	−2	7		0–1	4–2	—	1–0
4	Chiangmai	6	1	2	3	6	11	−5	5		2–2	1–5	1–1	—

Source: Thai League
Rules for classification: 1) Points; 2) Head-to-head points; 3) Head-to-head goal difference; 4) Head-to-head goal scored; 5) Overall goal difference; 6) Overall goal scored; 7) Fair play points; 8) Play-off without extra time).
(Q) Qualified for the phase indicated
18 April 2026
18:00 UTC+7
Matchday 1

Chiangmai	1–1	North Bangkok University
Pichai Thongvilas 44'	Report; Highlight	Jaden Marvin Meyer 37'

Chiangmai City Municipality Stadium,
Mueang, Chiang Mai
Attendance: 1,200
Referee: Nararit Srivorakul (Thailand)
19 April 2026
16:00 UTC+7
Matchday 1

Uttaradit	2–2	Prime Bangkok
Kunburus Sounses 70', 90+1'	Report; Highlight	Chawanwit Saelao 8'; Noppakhun Yingbamrung 35'

Uttaradit Provincial Stadium,
Mueang, Uttaradit
Attendance: 847
Referee: Palathip Homwarn (Thailand)

25 April 2026
16:00 UTC+7
Matchday 2

North Bangkok University	0–1	Uttaradit
	Report; Highlight	Wasan Mala 41'

Stadium of North Bangkok University,
Thanyaburi, Pathum Thani
Attendance: 219
Referee: Methas Kumarasit (Thailand)
25 April 2026
16:00 UTC+7
Matchday 2

Prime Bangkok	0–1	Chiangmai
	Report; Highlight	Mathawin Chueanun 84'

NT Stadium,
Lak Si, Bangkok
Attendance: 525
Referee: Kittiwat Kittpaksakun (Thailand)

28 April 2026
16:00 UTC+7
Matchday 3

North Bangkok University	4–2	Prime Bangkok
Phatiphan Charoensri 7'; Tanapat Phimol 13'; Phasagorn Promhong 67'; Anuson Thaloengram 86'	Report; Highlight	Washington Brandão dos Oliveira 20' (pen.); Kamin Kurakanok 57'

Stadium of North Bangkok University,
Thanyaburi, Pathum Thani
Attendance: 250
Referee: Kriangkrai Thiphanunjarukorn (Thailand)
28 April 2026
18:00 UTC+7
Matchday 3

Chiangmai	2–2	Uttaradit
Efrain Rintaro 11'; Pichai Thongvilas 32'	Report; Highlight	Luan Santos 69'; Worrapat Sukkapan 77'

Chiangmai City Municipality Stadium,
Mueang, Chiang Mai
Attendance: 1,696
Referee: Thanison Onjiw (Thailand)

2 May 2026
16:00 UTC+7
Matchday 4

Uttaradit	2–1	North Bangkok University
Phufah Chuenkromrak 58'; Lucas Gaudencio Moraes 90+6'	Report; Highlight	David Bernard Henri Darbellay 47'

Uttaradit Provincial Stadium,
Mueang, Uttaradit
Attendance: 785
Referee: Narit Mungtoemklang (Thailand)
3 May 2026
18:00 UTC+7
Matchday 4

Chiangmai	1–5	Prime Bangkok
Antonio Verzura 45'	Report; Highlight	Chawanwit Saelao 17', 90+4'; Teerapong Malai 67'; Washington Brandão dos Oliveira 80'; Mabiala Gaël Cedric 88'

Chiangmai City Municipality Stadium,
Mueang, Chiang Mai
Attendance: 1,367
Referee: Kittichai Huthip (Thailand)

9 May 2026
16:00 UTC+7
Matchday 5

Uttaradit	2–1	Chiangmai
Luan Santos 16'; Lucas Gaudencio Moraes 74'	Report; Highlight	Efrain Rintaro 26'

Uttaradit Provincial Stadium,
Mueang, Uttaradit
Attendance: 1,156
Referee: Nasri Tamat (Thailand)
10 May 2026
16:00 UTC+7
Matchday 5

Prime Bangkok	3–0	North Bangkok University
Washington Brandão dos Oliveira 1'; Chawanwit Saelao 9'; Pirada Larsawat 27'	Report; Highlight

NT Stadium,
Lak Si, Bangkok
Attendance: 326
Referee: Nararit Srivorakul (Thailand)

16 May 2026
16:00 UTC+7
Matchday 6

North Bangkok University	1–0	Chiangmai
Sakari Tukiainen 53'	Report; Highlight

Stadium of North Bangkok University,
Thanyaburi, Pathum Thani
Attendance: 250
Referee: Worapon Sanjan (Thailand)
16 May 2026
16:00 UTC+7
Matchday 6

Prime Bangkok	2–1	Uttaradit
Chawanwit Saelao 66'; Sumana Salapphet 78' (o.g.)	Report; Highlight	Kritsana Jamniankarn 56'

NT Stadium,
Lak Si, Bangkok
Attendance: 512
Referee: Rangsan Kangchainguan (Thailand)

=== Group B ===
Pos	Team	Pld	W	D	L	GF	GA	GD	Pts	Qualification	MLU	BPU	UDU	FLT
1	Muang Loei United (Q)	6	4	1	1	11	7	+4	13	Advance to knockout stage	—	1–0	2–1	1–0
2	Burapha United	6	3	1	2	8	8	0	10		2–4	—	1–0	2–2
3	Udon United	6	2	0	4	7	7	0	6		2–1	0–1	—	4–0
4	Fleet	6	1	2	3	7	11	−4	5		2–2	1–2	2–0	—

Source: Thai League
Rules for classification: 1) Points; 2) Head-to-head points; 3) Head-to-head goal difference; 4) Head-to-head goal scored; 5) Overall goal difference; 6) Overall goal scored; 7) Fair play points; 8) Play-off without extra time).
(Q) Qualified for the phase indicated
18 April 2026
16:00 UTC+7
Matchday 1

Muang Loei United	1–0	Fleet
Sihanart Sutisuk 73' (pen.)	Report; Highlight

Loei Provincial Stadium,
Mueang, Loei
Attendance: 819
Referee: Piyawat Rittimunee (Thailand)
19 April 2026
16:00 UTC+7
Matchday 1

Udon United	0–1	Burapha United
	Report; Highlight	Elias Emanuel de Magalhães Souza 71'

Stadium of Thailand National Sports University, Udon Thani Campus,
Mueang, Udon Thani
Attendance: 252
Referee: Natipong Aiemso (Thailand)

25 April 2026
16:00 UTC+7
Matchday 2

Fleet	2–0	Udon United
Tiago Chulapa 45+2', 67'	Report; Highlight

Battleship Stadium,
Sattahip, Chonburi
Attendance: 315
Referee: Rangsan Kangchainguan (Thailand)
25 April 2026
16:00 UTC+7
Matchday 2

Burapha United	2–4	Muang Loei United
Sansern Limwattana 45+4'; Kasidech Wettayawong 53'	Report; Highlight	Issei Kikuchi 25', 27'; Jakkaphat Phutthongsri 66'; Aphiwat Chaenban 85'

Banbueng Town Municipality Stadium,
Ban Bueng, Chonburi
Attendance: 1,054
Referee: Weeraphong Chaiyasuk (Thailand)

28 April 2026
16:00 UTC+7
Matchday 3

Muang Loei United	2–1	Udon United
Ratthasat Buaban 50'; Aphiwat Chaenban 90+4'	Report; Highlight	Jhakkarin Sitthichan 87'

Loei Provincial Stadium,
Mueang, Loei
Attendance: 679
Referee: Narinnart Tiamskun (Thailand)
28 April 2026
16:00 UTC+7
Matchday 3

Fleet	1–2	Burapha United
Tiago Chulapa 52'	Report; Highlight	Chalermsak Aukkee 16', 90+3'

Battleship Stadium,
Sattahip, Chonburi
Attendance: 375
Referee: Worapon Sanjan (Thailand)

2 May 2026
16:00 UTC+7
Matchday 4

Muang Loei United	1–0	Burapha United
Aphiwat Chaenban 89'	Report; Highlight

Loei Provincial Stadium,
Mueang, Loei
Attendance: 1,096
Referee: Palathip Homwarn (Thailand)
2 May 2026
16:00 UTC+7
Matchday 4

Udon United	4–0	Fleet
Alongkorn Jornnathong 28', 39'; Kwame Karikari 57'; Jhakkarin Sitthichan 90+4'	Report; Highlight

Stadium of Thailand National Sports University, Udon Thani Campus,
Mueang, Udon Thani
Attendance: 370
Referee: Suthipong Teekhasuk (Thailand)

9 May 2026
16:00 UTC+7
Matchday 5

Udon United	2–1	Muang Loei United
Chawin Srichan 76'; Nakarin Butaka 90+5'	Report; Highlight	Rapeepat Ainpalad 46'

Stadium of Thailand National Sports University, Udon Thani Campus,
Mueang, Udon Thani
Attendance: 350
Referee: Kanoksak Khiaodaeng (Thailand)
10 May 2026
18:00 UTC+7
Matchday 5

Burapha United	2–2	Fleet
Warayut Klomnak 50', 73'	Report; Highlight	Rafael Galhardo 78'; Tiago Chulapa 89'

Banbueng Town Municipality Stadium,
Ban Bueng, Chonburi
Attendance: 766
Referee: Kittichai Huthip (Thailand)

16 May 2026
16:00 UTC+7
Matchday 6

Burapha United	1–0	Udon United
Prawit Jittithaworn 83' (pen.)	Report; Highlight

Banbueng Town Municipality Stadium,
Ban Bueng, Chonburi
Attendance: 587
Referee: Amnat Rattanapakdee (Thailand)
16 May 2026
16:00 UTC+7
Matchday 6

Fleet	2–2	Muang Loei United
Andayut Nimnuch 6'; Pakkaphon Phengsuay 21'	Report; Highlight	Lucas Massaro Garcia Gama 3'; Sihanart Sutisuk 73'

Battleship Stadium,
Sattahip, Chonburi
Attendance: 208
Referee: Suthipong Teekhasuk (Thailand)

=== Group C ===
Pos	Team	Pld	W	D	L	GF	GA	GD	Pts	Qualification	STN	NRA	TBU	SKN
1	PT Satun (Q)	6	4	1	1	12	5	+7	13 (Note: PT Satun ahead on head-to-head record; PT Satun 3 pts (GD +1), Nara United 3 pts (GD -1).)	Advance to knockout stage	—	5–3	2–0	1–0
2	Nara United (Q)	6	4	1	1	14	10	+4	13	Advance to knockout stage	1–0	—	3–0	3–2
3	Thonburi United	6	1	2	3	6	13	−7	5		0–3	1–1	—	3–3
4	Samut Sakhon City	6	0	2	4	9	13	−4	2		1–1	2–3	1–2	—

Source: Thai League
Rules for classification: 1) Points; 2) Head-to-head points; 3) Head-to-head goal difference; 4) Head-to-head goal scored; 5) Overall goal difference; 6) Overall goal scored; 7) Fair play points; 8) Play-off without extra time).
(Q) Qualified for the phase indicated
Notes:
18 April 2026
16:00 UTC+7
Matchday 1

PT Satun	1–0	Samut Sakhon City
Wellerson da Silva Machado Guimarães 90+5'	Report; Highlight

Satun PAO. Stadium,
Mueang, Satun
Attendance: 2,396
Referee: Chaiya Moolmanee (Thailand)
19 April 2026
19:00 UTC+7
Matchday 1

Nara United	3–0	Thonburi United
Lucas Grossi de Araújo Reis 15', 48', 61'	Report; Highlight

Narathiwat PAO. Stadium,
Mueang, Narathiwat
Attendance: 4,086
Referee: Methas Kumarasit (Thailand)

26 April 2026
16:00 UTC+7
Matchday 2

Thonburi United	0–3	PT Satun
	Report; Highlight	Wellerson da Silva Machado Guimarães 18'; Caio da Conceição Silva 70'; Bruno Garcia Marcate 90+4'

Thonburi Stadium,
Nong Khaem, Bangkok
Attendance: 429
Referee: Sittisak Kaewkam (Thailand)
26 April 2026
17:00 UTC+7
Matchday 2

Samut Sakhon City	2–3	Nara United
Luís Felipe de Paula Marques Machado 29'; Muddasir Chedeng 65'	Report; Highlight	Lucas Grossi de Araújo Reis 8', 15'; Elson Hooi 46'

Stadium of Thailand National Sports University, Samut Sakhon Campus,
Mueang, Samut Sakhon
Attendance: 988
Referee: Manuschai Chawong (Thailand)

29 April 2026
16:00 UTC+7
Matchday 3

PT Satun	5–3	Nara United
Wellerson da Silva Machado Guimarães 6', 67'; Chaiyasit Popoon 45+1'; Bruno Garcia Marcate 45+5'; Anon San-Mhard 89'	Report	Lucas Grossi de Araújo Reis 78'; Thanawat Srisawat 84'; Pedro Lucas Jesus Paixão Martins 90+1'

Satun PAO. Stadium,
Mueang, Satun
Attendance: 4,195
Referee: Metawin Chujit (Thailand)
29 April 2026
17:00 UTC+7
Matchday 3

Samut Sakhon City	1–2	Thonburi United
Luís Felipe de Paula Marques Machado 72'	Report; Highlight	Ademola Sodiq Adeyemi 38'; Thanadon Thongmuangiaung 59'

Stadium of Thailand National Sports University, Samut Sakhon Campus,
Mueang, Samut Sakhon
Attendance: 457
Referee: Chaiya Moolmanee (Thailand)

3 May 2026
16:00 UTC+7
Matchday 4

PT Satun	2–0	Thonburi United
Bruno Garcia Marcate 6'; Caio da Conceição Silva 78'	Report; Highlight

Satun PAO. Stadium,
Mueang, Satun
Attendance: 3,974
Referee: Wathanyu Morin (Thailand)
3 May 2026
19:00 UTC+7
Matchday 4

Nara United	3–2	Samut Sakhon City
Lucas Grossi de Araújo Reis 32', 75', 90+7'	Report; Highlight	Ratchapol Nawanno 10'; Diogo Pereira 14'

Narathiwat PAO. Stadium,
Mueang, Narathiwat
Referee: Samrit Ritkaew (Thailand)

9 May 2026
19:00 UTC+7
Matchday 5

Nara United	1–0	PT Satun
Pedro Lucas Jesus Paixão Martins 90+5'	Report; Highlight

Narathiwat PAO. Stadium,
Mueang, Narathiwat
Attendance: 5,384
Referee: Narinnart Tiamskun (Thailand)
10 May 2026
16:00 UTC+7
Matchday 5

Thonburi United	3–3	Samut Sakhon City
Abdolreza Zarei 45+2', 51'; Ademola Sodiq Adeyemi 45+5' (pen.)	Report; Highlight	Diogo Pereira 25' (pen.), 43'; Ratchapol Nawanno 61'

Thonburi Stadium,
Nong Khaem, Bangkok
Attendance: 475
Referee: Jarin Yawapee (Thailand)

16 May 2026
16:00 UTC+7
Matchday 6

Samut Sakhon City	1–1	PT Satun
Muddasir Chedeng 27'	Report; Highlight	Phanthawat Khetchompu 57' (pen.)

Stadium of Thailand National Sports University, Samut Sakhon Campus,
Mueang, Samut Sakhon
Attendance: 598
Referee: Weeraphong Chaiyasuk (Thailand)
16 May 2026
16:00 UTC+7
Matchday 6

Thonburi United	1–1	Nara United
Phakhawat Sapphaso 82'	Report; Highlight	Ahamarasul Duereh 86'

Thonburi Stadium,
Nong Khaem, Bangkok
Attendance: 375
Referee: Pichet Chumcha (Thailand)

=== Ranking of second-placed clubs ===
Pos	Grp	Team	Pld	W	D	L	GF	GA	GD	Pts	Qualification
1	C	Nara United	6	4	1	1	14	10	+4	13	Advance to knockout stage
2	A	Prime Bangkok	6	3	1	2	14	9	+5	10	
3	B	Burapha United	6	3	1	2	8	8	0	10	

Source: Thai League
Rules for classification: 1) Points; 2) Goal difference; 3) Goals scored; 4) Away goals scored; 5) Wins; 6) Away wins.

== Knockout stage ==
The four advancing clubs enter the knockout rounds, which consist of the semi-finals, a third-place play-off, and the final. All matches are played over two legs, with aggregate scoring determining the winners. If the aggregate score is tied after both legs, extra time will be played, followed by a penalty shoot-out if necessary.

Semi-finals
Muang Loei United	0	1	1
Uttaradit	2	2	4
PT Satun	0	1	1
Nara United	0	5	5

Finals
Uttaradit	2	1	3
Nara United	3	1	4
Third place play-offs
Muang Loei United	1	1	2
PT Satun (a.e.t.)	1	3	4

=== Semi-finals ===
==== Summary ====
Team 1	Agg.	Team 2	1st leg	2nd leg
Muang Loei United	1–4	Uttaradit	0–2	1–2
PT Satun	1–5	Nara United	0–0	1–5

==== Matches ====
24 May 2026
16:00 UTC+7
Semi-finals 1st leg

Muang Loei United	0–2	Uttaradit
	Report; Highlight	Luan Santos 35'; Nontawat Onsuebsai 90+7'

Loei Provincial Stadium,
Mueang, Loei
Attendance: 1,447
Referee: Metawin Chujit (Thailand)
31 May 2026
15:30 UTC+7
Semi-finals 2nd leg

Uttaradit	2–1	Muang Loei United
Lucas Gaudencio Moraes 85', 90+2'	Report; Highlight	Winiton Duangchai 19'

Uttaradit Provincial Stadium,
Mueang, Uttaradit
Attendance: 2,468
Referee: Chaiya Moolmanee (Thailand)

Uttaradit won 4–1 on aggregate.

23 May 2026
16:00 UTC+7
Semi-finals 1st leg

PT Satun	0–0	Nara United
	Report; Highlight

Satun PAO. Stadium,
Mueang, Satun
Attendance: 4,930
Referee: Kotchapoom Meesridaecha (Thailand)
30 May 2026
19:00 UTC+7
Semi-finals 2nd leg

Nara United	5–1	PT Satun
Pedro Lucas Jesus Paixão Martins 3', 19'; Lucas Grossi de Araújo Reis 42', 50', 89'	Report; Highlight	Chaiyasit Popoon 73'

Narathiwat PAO. Stadium,
Mueang, Narathiwat
Attendance: 6,500
Referee: Noppadet Mangngam (Thailand)

Nara United won 5–1 on aggregate.

=== Third place play-offs ===
==== Summary ====
Team 1	Agg.	Team 2	1st leg	2nd leg
Muang Loei United	2–4	PT Satun	1–1	1–3 (a.e.t.)

==== Matches ====
7 June 2026
16:00 UTC+7
Third place play-offs 1st leg

Muang Loei United	1–1	PT Satun
Thanakon Sathanphong 77' (o.g.)	Report; Highlight	Caio da Conceição Silva 64'

Loei Provincial Stadium,
Mueang, Loei
Attendance: 1,016
Referee: Pawara Seejen (Thailand)
13 June 2026
15:30 UTC+7
Third place play-offs 2nd leg

PT Satun	3–1 (a.e.t.)	Muang Loei United
Caio da Conceição Silva 91', 116', 120+1'	Report; Highlight	Lucas Massaro Garcia Gama 118'

Satun PAO. Stadium,
Mueang, Satun
Attendance: 4,994
Referee: Chaireag Ngam-som (Thailand)

PT Satun won 4–2 on aggregate.

=== Finals ===
==== Summary ====
Team 1	Agg.	Team 2	1st leg	2nd leg
Uttaradit	3–4	Nara United	2–3	1–1

==== Matches ====
===== 1st leg =====
7 June 2026
16:00 UTC+7
Finals 1st leg

Uttaradit	2–3	Nara United
Luan Santos 16'; Lucas Gaudencio Moraes 27'	Report; Highlight	Akrom Mamood 4'; Pedro Lucas Jesus Paixão Martins 23' (pen.); Elson Hooi 59'

Uttaradit Provincial Stadium,
Mueang, Uttaradit
Attendance: 1,759
Referee: Satchukorn Saenchu (Thailand)

Uttaradit	Nara United

Lineups:
GK	22	(Thailand) Sakpon Nichakam
CB	81	(Thailand) Anuwat Phikulsri		(substituted off) 46'
CB	6	(Thailand) Worrapat Sukkapan
CB	29	(Thailand) Weerachai Takerngpol
DM	28	(Thailand) Tochiao Yodthong		(substituted off) 46'
RM	31	(Thailand) Wasan Mala
AM	26	(Thailand) Surachett Khunnu
LM	37	(Thailand) Phufah Chuenkromrak (c)		(substituted off) 69'
RF	7	(Brazil) Lucas Gaudencio Moraes	27'
CF	91	(Brazil) Luan Santos	16'
LF	9	(Thailand) Kunburus Sounses
Substitutes:
GK	50	(Thailand) Suphanat Suman
GK	99	(Thailand) Itthipon Kamsuprom
DF	3	(Thailand) Sumana Salapphet		(substituted on) 46'
DF	4	(Thailand) Kritsana Jamniankarn
DF	17	(Thailand) Suwat Yadee
DF	96	(Thailand) Punnapob Namanu
MF	11	(Thailand) Chayawut Putta
MF	18	(Thailand) Nontawat Onsuebsai		(substituted on) 69'
MF	19	(Thailand) Saharat Posri		(substituted on) 46'
MF	55	(Thailand) Ratthathammanun Deeying
Head Coach:
(Thailand) Anucha Chaiyawong

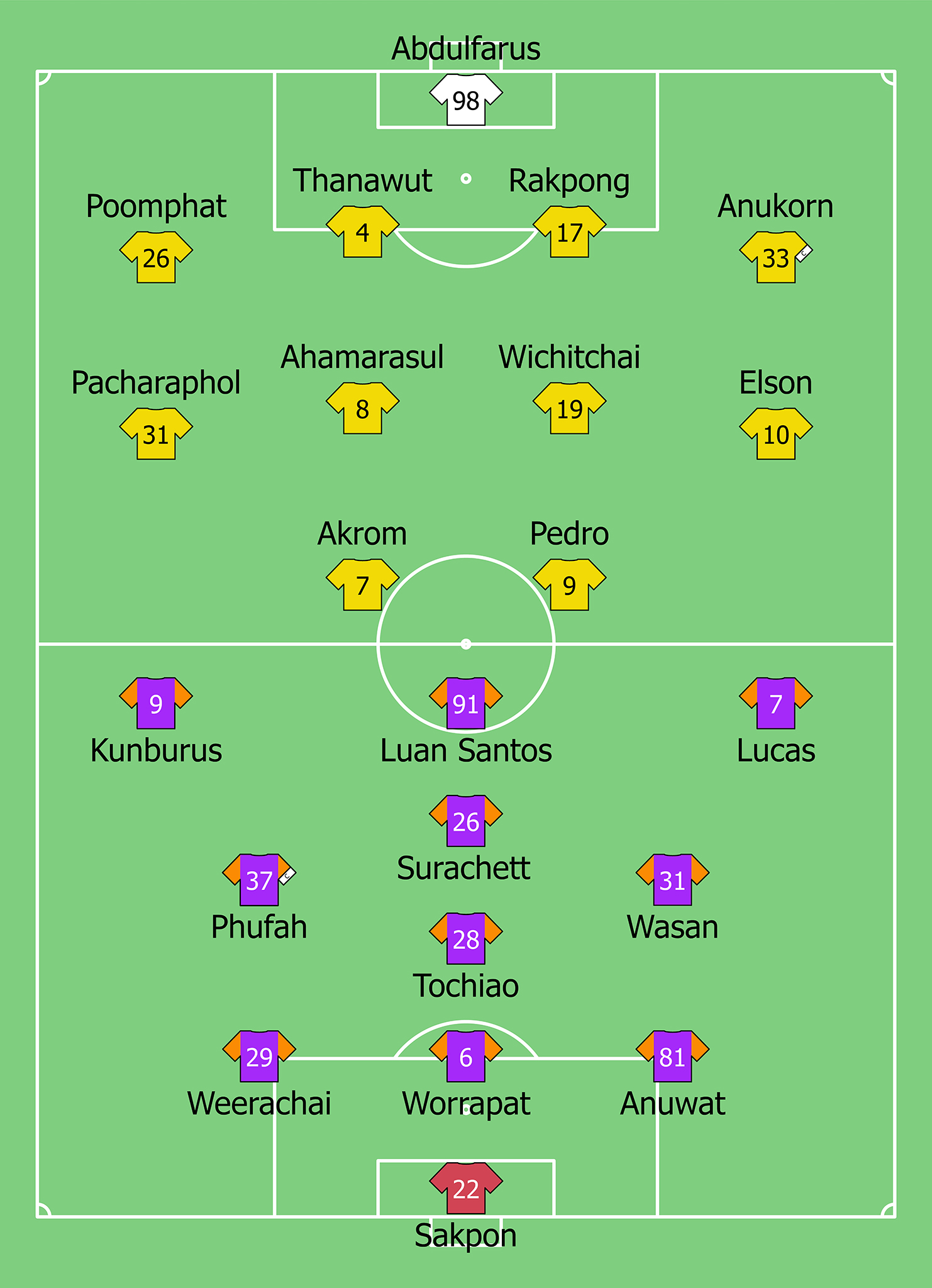

Lineups:
GK	98	(Thailand) Abdulfarus Sama-ae		(yellow card) 84'
RB	26	(Thailand) Poomphat Sarapisitphat
CB	4	(Thailand) Thanawut Klinsukon
CB	17	(Thailand) Rakpong Chumuang
LB	33	(Thailand) Anukorn Sangrum (c)
RM	31	(Thailand) Pacharaphol Lekkun			(substituted off) 67'
CM	8	(Thailand) Ahamarasul Duereh			(substituted off) 46'
CM	19	(Thailand) Wichitchai Chauyseenual
LM	10	(Curaçao) Elson Hooi	59'
CF	7	(Thailand) Akrom Mamood	4'		(substituted off) 46'
CF	9	(Brazil) Pedro Lucas Jesus Paixão Martins	23' (pen.)		(substituted off) 27'
Substitutes:
GK	18	(Thailand) Cholatarn Samaelaeh
DF	2	(Thailand) Nattapong Phephat			(substituted on) 46'
MF	12	(Thailand) Yannick Nussbaum
MF	23	(Thailand) Chitpanya Tisud			(substituted on) 46'	(substituted off) 81'
MF	28	(Thailand) Hamdee Binmudo				(substituted on) 81'
MF	88	(Thailand) Somnuek Kaewarporn			(substituted on) 67'
FW	62	(Brazil) Lucas Grossi de Araújo Reis
FW	77	(Thailand) Thanawat Srisawat		(yellow card) 48'	(substituted on) 27'
Head Coach:
(Thailand) Wasan Sungkhaphan

===== 2nd leg =====
14 June 2026
19:00 UTC+7
Finals 2nd leg

Nara United	1–1	Uttaradit
Ahamarasul Duereh 90+1'	Report; Highlight	Luan Santos 52'

Narathiwat PAO. Stadium,
Mueang, Narathiwat
Attendance: 9,350
Referee: Ekkachai Phetcham (Thailand)

Nara United	Uttaradit

Lineups:
GK	98	(Thailand) Abdulfarus Sama-ae		(yellow card) 90+5'
RB	12	(Thailand) Yannick Nussbaum			(substituted off) 90+5'
CB	4	(Thailand) Thanawut Klinsukon
CB	33	(Thailand) Anukorn Sangrum		(yellow card) 90+6'
LB	2	(Thailand) Nattapong Phephat
RM	23	(Thailand) Chitpanya Tisud		(yellow card) 34'	(substituted off) 60'
CM	88	(Thailand) Somnuek Kaewarporn (c)		(yellow card) 11'	(substituted off) 46'
CM	19	(Thailand) Wichitchai Chauyseenual			(substituted off) 74'
LM	10	(Curaçao) Elson Hooi		(yellow card) 43'
CF	62	(Brazil) Lucas Grossi de Araújo Reis		(yellow card) 77' (yellow-red card) 90+4'
CF	77	(Thailand) Thanawat Srisawat			(substituted off) 60'
Substitutes:
GK	18	(Thailand) Cholatarn Samaelaeh
DF	17	(Thailand) Rakpong Chumuang			(substituted on) 74'
DF	24	(Thailand) Salman Waesuemae
DF	26	(Thailand) Poomphat Sarapisitphat			(substituted on) 90+5'
DF	50	(Thailand) Ah-mad Tohtaba
MF	6	(Thailand) Kuwa-el Yaworhasan
MF	7	(Thailand) Akrom Mamood
MF	8	(Thailand) Ahamarasul Duereh	90+1'		(substituted on) 60'
MF	15	(Thailand) Adam Useng
MF	28	(Thailand) Hamdee Binmudo
MF	31	(Thailand) Pacharaphol Lekkun			(substituted on) 46'
FW	9	(Brazil) Pedro Lucas Jesus Paixão Martins			(substituted on) 60'
Head Coach:
(Thailand) Wasan Sungkhaphan

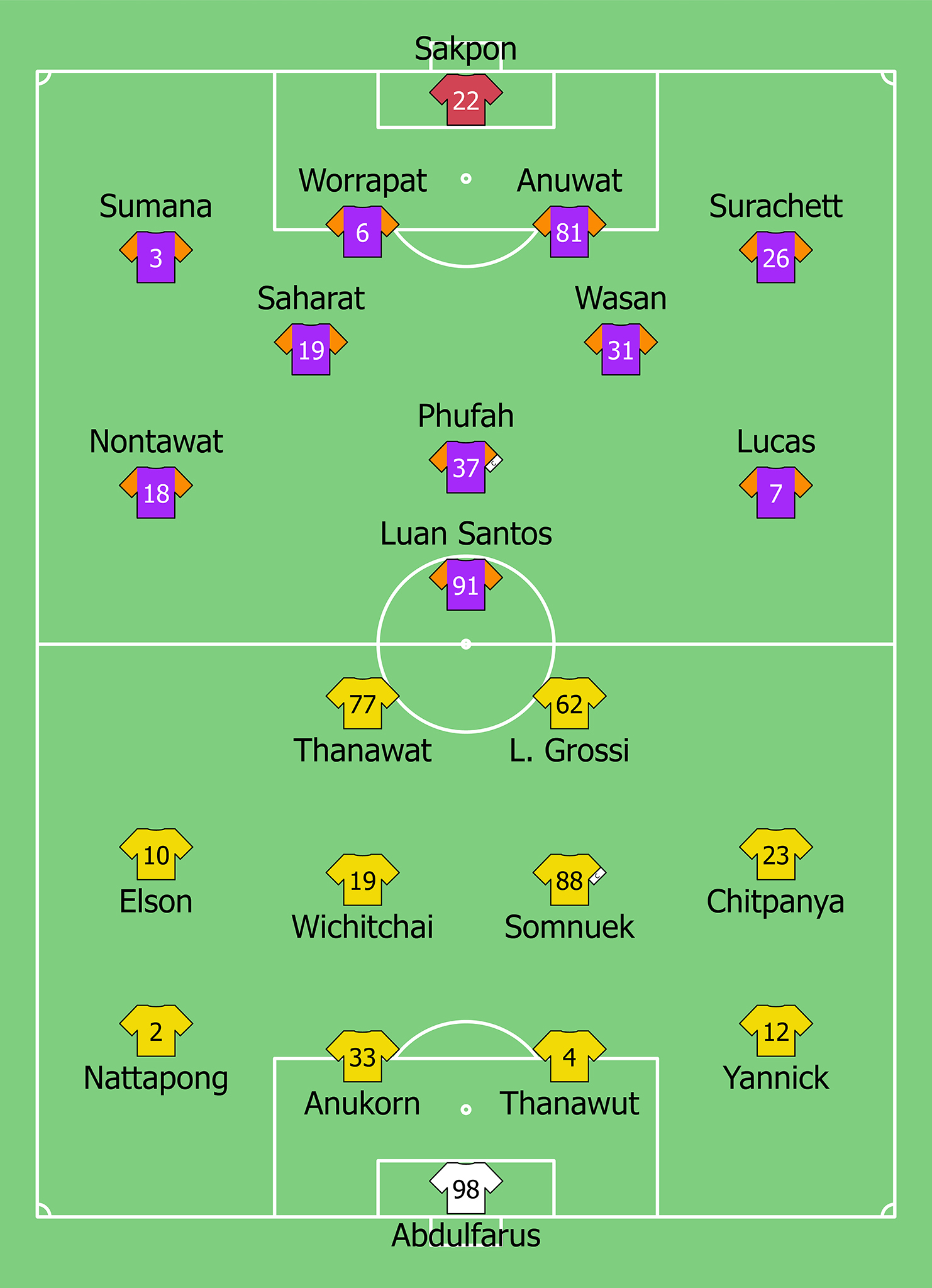

Lineups:
GK	22	(Thailand) Sakpon Nichakam
RB	3	(Thailand) Sumana Salapphet		(yellow card) 5'	(substituted off) 74'
CB	6	(Thailand) Worrapat Sukkapan		(yellow card) 23' (yellow-red card) 90+4'
CB	81	(Thailand) Anuwat Phikulsri
LB	26	(Thailand) Surachett Khunnu			(substituted off) 85'
DM	19	(Thailand) Saharat Posri
DM	31	(Thailand) Wasan Mala
RM	18	(Thailand) Nontawat Onsuebsai			(substituted off) 85'
AM	37	(Thailand) Phufah Chuenkromrak (c)			(substituted off) 64'
LM	7	(Brazil) Lucas Gaudencio Moraes
CF	91	(Brazil) Luan Santos	52'
Substitutes:
GK	50	(Thailand) Suphanat Suman
GK	99	(Thailand) Itthipon Kamsuprom
DF	4	(Thailand) Kritsana Jamniankarn
DF	17	(Thailand) Suwat Yadee
DF	29	(Thailand) Weerachai Takerngpol
DF	96	(Thailand) Punnapob Namanu			(substituted on) 85'
MF	11	(Thailand) Chayawut Putta
MF	28	(Thailand) Tochiao Yodthong			(substituted on) 85'
MF	55	(Thailand) Ratthathammanun Deeying			(substituted on) 74'
FW	9	(Thailand) Kunburus Sounses			(substituted on) 64'
Head Coach:
(Thailand) Anucha Chaiyawong

Nara United won 4–3 on aggregate.

== Statistics ==
=== Goalscorers ===
There were 135 goals scored in 44 matches, for an average of 3.07 goals per match.

12 goals

- (Brazil) Lucas Grossi de Araújo Reis (Nara United)

6 goals

- (Brazil) Caio da Conceição Silva (PT Satun)

5 goals

- (Brazil) Pedro Lucas Jesus Paixão Martins (Nara United)
- (Thailand) Chawanwit Saelao (Prime Bangkok)
- (Brazil) Luan Santos (Uttaradit)
- (Brazil) Lucas Gaudencio Moraes (Uttaradit)

4 goals

- (Brazil) Tiago Chulapa (Fleet)
- (Brazil) Wellerson da Silva Machado Guimarães (PT Satun)

3 goals

- (Thailand) Aphiwat Chaenban (Muang Loei United)
- (Brazil) Washington Brandão dos Oliveira (Prime Bangkok)
- (Brazil) Bruno Garcia Marcate (PT Satun)
- (Brazil) Diogo Pereira (Samut Sakhon City)

2 goals

- (Thailand) Chalermsak Aukkee (Burapha United)
- (Thailand) Warayut Klomnak (Burapha United)
- (Brazil) Efrain Rintaro (Chiangmai)
- (Thailand) Pichai Thongvilas (Chiangmai)
- (Japan) Issei Kikuchi (Muang Loei United)
- (Brazil) Lucas Massaro Garcia Gama (Muang Loei United)
- (Thailand) Sihanart Sutisuk (Muang Loei United)
- (Thailand) Ahamarasul Duereh (Nara United)
- (Curaçao) Elson Hooi (Nara United)
- (Thailand) Chaiyasit Popoon (PT Satun)
- (Brazil) Luís Felipe de Paula Marques Machado (Samut Sakhon City)
- (Thailand) Muddasir Chedeng (Samut Sakhon City)
- (Thailand) Ratchapol Nawanno (Samut Sakhon City)
- (Iran) Abdolreza Zarei (Thonburi United)
- (Nigeria) Ademola Sodiq Adeyemi (Thonburi United)
- (Thailand) Alongkorn Jornnathong (Udon United)
- (Thailand) Jhakkarin Sitthichan (Udon United)
- (Thailand) Kunburus Sounses (Uttaradit)

1 goal

- (Brazil) Elias Emanuel de Magalhães Souza (Burapha United)
- (Thailand) Kasidech Wettayawong (Burapha United)
- (Thailand) Prawit Jittithaworn (Burapha United)
- (Thailand) Sansern Limwattana (Burapha United)
- (Thailand) Antonio Verzura (Chiangmai)
- (Thailand) Mathawin Chueanun (Chiangmai)
- (Thailand) Andayut Nimnuch (Fleet)
- (Thailand) Pakkaphon Phengsuay (Fleet)
- (Brazil) Rafael Galhardo (Fleet)
- (Thailand) Jakkaphat Phutthongsri (Muang Loei United)
- (Thailand) Rapeepat Ainpalad (Muang Loei United)
- (Thailand) Ratthasat Buaban (Muang Loei United)
- (Thailand) Winiton Duangchai (Muang Loei United)
- (Thailand) Akrom Mamood (Nara United)
- (Thailand) Thanawat Srisawat (Nara United)
- (Thailand) Anuson Thaloengram (North Bangkok University)
- (Thailand) David Bernard Henri Darbellay (North Bangkok University)
- (Germany) Jaden Marvin Meyer (North Bangkok University)
- (Thailand) Phasagorn Promhong (North Bangkok University)
- (Thailand) Phatiphan Charoensri (North Bangkok University)
- (Finland) Sakari Tukiainen (North Bangkok University)
- (Thailand) Tanapat Phimol (North Bangkok University)
- (Thailand) Kamin Kurakanok (Prime Bangkok)
- (France) Mabiala Gaël Cedric (Prime Bangkok)
- (Thailand) Noppakhun Yingbamrung (Prime Bangkok)
- (Thailand) Pirada Larsawat (Prime Bangkok)
- (Thailand) Teerapong Malai (Prime Bangkok)
- (Thailand) Anon San-Mhard (PT Satun)
- (Thailand) Phanthawat Khetchompu (PT Satun)
- (Thailand) Phakhawat Sapphaso (Thonburi United)
- (Thailand) Thanadon Thongmuangiaung (Thonburi United)
- (Thailand) Chawin Srichan (Udon United)
- (Ghana) Kwame Karikari (Udon United)
- (Thailand) Nakarin Butaka (Udon United)
- (Thailand) Kritsana Jamniankarn (Uttaradit)
- (Thailand) Nontawat Onsuebsai (Uttaradit)
- (Thailand) Phufah Chuenkromrak (Uttaradit)
- (Thailand) Wasan Mala (Uttaradit)
- (Thailand) Worrapat Sukkapan (Uttaradit)

1 own goal

- (Thailand) Thanakon Sathanphong (PT Satun against Muang Loei United)
- (Thailand) Sumana Salapphet (Uttaradit against Prime Bangkok)

Source: Thai League

== Promotion to 2026–27 Thai League 2 ==
Team	Region	Method of qualification	Date of qualification
Uttaradit	Northern region	Runners Up	31 May 2026
PT Satun	Southern region	Third placed	13 June 2026
Muang Loei United	Northeastern region	Fourth placed	9 July 2026
