= 2025–26 Hougang United FC season =

Hougang United
2025–26 season
- Chairman: Bill Ng
- Head coach: Robert Eziakor (Interim, Till 27 October 2025); Pannarai Pansiri
- Stadium: Jalan Besar Stadium
- S.League: TBD
- Singapore Cup: TBD
- Top goalscorer: League: TBD; All: TBD
Home colours	Away colours

The 2025–26 season is Hougang United's 28th consecutive season in the top flight of Singapore football and in the Singapore Premier League (SPL) and the Singapore Cup.

The women team will participate in the Women's Premier League.

== Review ==
In March 2026, the Football Association of Singapore (FAS) discovered Hougang had fielded an ineligible foreign player Gloire Amanda, a Tanzanian-born Canadian citizen, in SPL and SPL2 matches. Hougang had submitted Amanda's work permit application to the FAS but not the approved work permit as Amanda had yet to receive his work permit. Prior to discovery, Amanda had played three matches, two in SPL and one in SPL2. FAS fined Hougang and overturned the results for the 1–0 win against BG Tampines Rovers in SPL2 to a 0–3 loss and the 2–0 win against the Young Lions in the SPL to a 0–3 loss also. The other match against Lion City Sailors in the SPL which was a 1–5 loss remains unchanged as it is a greater margin than 0–3. As a result, Hougang dropped from fifth to sixth in the table. On 7 March, it was reported that the Ministry of Manpower began investigation of the club and Amanda for "for working without a valid work pass".

== Squad ==
=== Singapore Premier League ===
No.	Name	Nationality	Date of birth (age)	Previous club	Contract since	Contract end
Goalkeepers
18	Mykel Gabriel De Rozario	(Singapore) (Philippines) (Portugal)	1 January 2006 (age 20)	(Singapore) Hougang United U21	2024	2026
24	Aizil Yazid	(Singapore)	24 December 2004 (age 21)	(Singapore) Hougang United	2023	2026
28	Zharfan Rohaizad	(Singapore)	21 February 1997 (age 29)	(Singapore) Lion City Sailors	2025	2026
31	Ridhuan Barudin	(Singapore)	23 March 1987 (age 39)	(Singapore) BG Tampines Rovers	2025	2026
50	Rauf Erwan	(Singapore)	25 April 2005 (age 21)	(Singapore) Young Lions	2025	2026
61	Isaac Jonathan Hean-Oon Lee	(Singapore)	17 March 2006 (age 20)	(Singapore) Hougang United U21	2023	2026
Defenders
2	Anders Aplin	(Singapore) (England)	21 June 1991 (age 35)	(Singapore) Geylang International	2020	2025
3	Jordan Nicolas Vestering	(Singapore) (Netherlands)	25 September 2000 (age 26)	(Singapore) NFA U18	2018	2025
5	Kanok Kongsimma	(Thailand)	4 September 2000 (age 26)	(Thailand) Suphanburi (T2)	2025	2026
15	Parinya Nusong	(Thailand)	7 April 2005 (age 21)	(Thailand) Chonburi (T2)	2025	2026
16	Rishon Soroya	(Singapore)		(Singapore) Hougang United U21	2025	2026
17	Washington Jaramillo	(Ecuador)	16 February 1999 (age 27)	(Ecuador) C.D. Olmedo (E2)	2025	2026
19	Rauf Sanizal	(Singapore)	7 November 2006 (age 19)	(Singapore) Hougang United U21	2022	2026
21	Iman Adli Haziq	(Singapore)		(Singapore) Hougang United U21	2025	2026
27	Khilfi Aniq	(Singapore)		(Singapore) Hougang United U21	2023	2026
29	Matin Manaf	(Singapore)		(Singapore) Hougang United U21	2025	2026
33	Ryaan Sanizal	(Singapore)	31 May 2002 (age 24)	(Singapore) Young Lions	2025	2027
36	Nabilai Kibunguchy	(Kenya) (United States)	5 January 1998 (age 28)	(United States) Sarasota Paradise (U4)	2025	2026
37	Adam Ali	(Singapore)	28 September 2006 (age 20)	(Singapore) Hougang United U21	2024	2026
42	Wong Ngang Haang	(Singapore)	3 March 2004 (age 22)	(Singapore) Balestier Khalsa	2026	2026
44	Aryan Boon	(Singapore) (Philippines)	14 September 2007 (age 19)	(Japan) Albirex Niigata (S) U17	2026	2026
57	Algirdas Karlonas	(Lithuania)	21 January 2009 (age 17)	(Singapore) Lion City Sailors U17	2025	2026
66	Mikhael Ismail	(Singapore)		(Singapore) Balestier Khalsa U17	2024	2026
Midfielders
4	Chonlawit Kanuengkid	(Thailand)	30 December 1992 (age 33)	(Thailand) Chiangmai United (T2)	2025	2026
6	Huzaifah Aziz	(Singapore)	27 June 1994 (age 32)	(Singapore) Geylang International	2025	2026
7	Saifullah Akbar	(Singapore)	31 January 1999 (age 27)	(Singapore) BG Tampines Rovers	2025	2026
8	Saharat Panmarchya	(Thailand)	1 March 1998 (age 28)	(Thailand) Nongbua Pitchaya (T2)	2025	2026
22	Brant Tan Jun Rong	(Singapore)	22 November 2003 (age 22)	(Singapore) Hougang United U21	2023	2026
30	Farhan Sahlan	(Singapore)	21 July 2003 (age 23)	(Japan) Albirex Niigata U21	2025	2026
47	Neil Charles Callanta	(Philippines)	8 March 2007 (age 19)	(Singapore) Hougang United Youth	2025	2026
55	Woo Chun Wei	(Singapore)	7 December 2004 (age 21)	(Singapore) Hougang United U21	2023	2026
71	Ganesan Silloren	(Singapore)		(Singapore) Project Vaults	2025	2026
78	Yuma Suwa	(Japan)	29 August 2000 (age 26)	(Montenegro) FK Bokelj (M1)	2025	2026
	Kasinadar Sugumaran	(Singapore)		(Singapore)	2025	2026
Strikers
9	Gloire Amanda (Note: Gloire Amanda’s work pass application had been rejected by MOM, he remains under contract with the Cheetahs till the end of the season.)	(Tanzania) (Canada) (Republic of the Congo)	11 November 1998 (age 27)	(Australia) Sydney Olympic FC	2025	2026
10	Farhan Zulkifli	(Singapore)	10 November 2002 (age 23)	(Singapore) Young Lions	2019	2025
11	Settawut Wongsai	(Thailand)	7 May 1997 (age 29)	(Thailand) Phrae United (T2)	2025	2026
54	Syady Sufwan	(Singapore)	28 April 2002 (age 24)	(Singapore) Geylang International U21	2025	2026
67	G.Sheeva	(Singapore)		(Singapore)	2025	2026
80	Víctor Blasco	(Spain)	1 July 1994 (age 32)	(Malta) Balzan (M1)	2025	2026
95	Jaushua Sotirio	(New Caledonia) (Australia)	11 October 1995 (age 30)	(Australia) Sydney FC	2025	2026
99	Yang He	(China)	22 March 1990 (age 36)	(China) Yunnan Yukun (C1)	2026	2026
Players who left for NS during the season
16	Ajay Robson	(Singapore)	6 December 2003 (age 22)	Youth Team	2023	2025
51	Nicholas Jordan Sea	(Singapore)	15 July 2003 (age 23)	(Singapore) Hougang United U17	2023	2025
53	Keith Chung Wen Jie	(Singapore) (Vietnam)	20 November 2004 (age 21)	(Singapore) Tanjong Pagar United U21	2023	2025
	Gabriel Goh	(Singapore)	29 March 2004 (age 22)	(Japan) Albirex Niigata (S) U21	2024	2025
	Iryan Fandi	(Singapore) (South Africa)	9 August 2006 (age 20)	(Singapore) Hougang United U17	2022	2023
56	Louka Tan	(Singapore) (France)	13 June 2005 (age 21)	(Singapore) Hougang United U17	2023	2025
Players who left during the season
7	Hugo Kametani	(Japan)	26 January 1999 (age 27)	(Cambodia) Nagaworld FC (C1)	2025	2026
8	Yotsakorn Burapha	(Thailand)	8 June 2005 (age 21)	(Thailand) Chonburi (T2)	2025	2026
13	Yuta Kikuchi	(Japan)	14 May 1994 (age 32)	(Cambodia) Nagaworld FC (C1)	2025	2026
23	Sam Strong	(United States)	23 August 1996 (age 30)	(Cambodia) Life FC (C1)	2025	2026
24	Haiqal Pashia	(Singapore)	29 November 1998 (age 27)	(Singapore) Lion City Sailors	2025	2026
38	Nasrul Pujiyono	(Singapore) (Indonesia)	7 August 2002 (age 24)	(Singapore) SAFSA	2023	2026
41	Ryohei Yoshihama	(Japan)	24 October 1992 (age 33)	(Cambodia) Boeung Ket F.C. (C1)	2025	2026
45	Frank Chiboy Ebele	(Nigeria)			2025	2026
58	Shahreez Basheer	(Singapore)	8 May 2005 (age 21)	(Singapore) Hougang United U21	2025	2026
77	Christopher Lee Yee Wen	(Singapore)		(Singapore)	2025	2026

Remarks:
^{FP U21} These players are registered as U21 foreign players.

=== Women's squad (2025) ===
No.	Name	Nationality	Date of birth (age)	Previous club	Contract since	Contract end
Goalkeepers
1	Nurul Faizah	(Singapore)		(Singapore) Still Aerion Women's	2024	2025
15	Intan Afiqah	(Singapore)		(Singapore) Tanjong Pagar United (W)	2025	2025
Defenders
2	K.Harini	(Singapore)	20 July 2004 (age 22)	(Singapore) Royal Arion (WNL)	2025	2025
3	Angelyn Pang Yen Ping	(Singapore)	13 April 1991 (age 35)	(Singapore) Tiong Bahru FC (W)	2023	2025
5	Jaslyn Leong Fei Ping	(Singapore)		(Singapore)	2024	2025
6	Claire Merrow-Smith	(Singapore)		(Singapore)	2023	2025
18	Rachel Liew	(Singapore)		(Singapore) Still Aerion Women's	2025	2025
23	Adrianna Hazeri	(Singapore)	3 July 2006 (age 20)	(Singapore) Tanjong Pagar United (W)	2025	2025
24	Hailey Cheung	(Singapore) (Hong Kong)		(Singapore)	2025	2025
25	Tasneem Khozem	(Singapore)		(Singapore)	2025	2025
Midfielders
8	Victoria Tan	(Singapore)		(Singapore)	2024	2025
11	Siti Nurfarah	(Singapore)	22 August 2006 (age 20)	(Singapore) Warriors FC	2024	2025
13	Winette Lim Siu	(Singapore)	20 May 1999 (age 27)	(Singapore) Tiong Bahru FC (W)	2023	2025
14	Nisreen Aziz	(Singapore)	20 May 2008 (age 18)	(Singapore) ESA Academy	2025	2025
17	Lily Rozana Joehann Aung	(Singapore) (Myanmar)		(Singapore) Tiong Bahru FC (W)	2025	2025
19	Fatin Nur Syaraf	(Singapore)		(Singapore)	2025	2025
21	Rochelle Chan Wan Wen	(Singapore)	21 August 1995 (age 31)	(Singapore) Tiong Bahru FC (W)	2023	2025
27	Riddle Reneelyn Sison	(Philippines) (Singapore)		(Singapore) Tiong Bahru FC (W)	2023	2025
Strikers
4	Raudhah Kamis	(Singapore)	4 March 1999 (age 27)	(Singapore) Tiong Bahru FC (W)	2023	2025
7	Sydney Hector	(Canada)	27 January 1997 (age 29)	(Singapore) Balestier Khalsa (W)	2024	2025
10	Faith Ho Xin Ning	(Singapore)	14 October 2005 (age 20)	(Singapore)	2024	2025
12	Claire Marie Tay	(Singapore)	14 January 2000 (age 26)	(Singapore) Still Aerion Women's	2024	2025
20	Clae Kho	(Singapore)		(Singapore) Tiong Bahru FC (W)	2025	2025
29	Nur Syafina Putri	(Singapore)	9 August 2004 (age 22)	(Singapore) Lion City Sailors	2024	2025
	Zoey Chua	(Singapore)	26 March 2006 (age 20)	(Singapore) Warriors FC	2024	2025
Players who left mid-season
9	Nasriah Ibrahim	(Singapore)	1 September 2004 (age 22)	(Singapore) Balestier Khalsa (W)	2024	2025
22	Nuurfathimah Syaakirah	(Singapore)		(Singapore)	2025	2025

=== Women's squad (2026) ===
No.	Name	Nationality	Date of birth (age)	Previous club	Contract since	Contract end
Goalkeepers
3	Ishita Pathania	(Singapore)		(Singapore)	2026	2026
18	Tay Siew Yin	(Singapore)		(Singapore) Tanjong Pagar United	2026	2026
1	Nurul Faizah	(Singapore)		(Singapore) Still Aerion Women's	2024	2025
15	Intan Afiqah	(Singapore)		(Singapore) Tanjong Pagar United	2025	2025
Defenders
5	Michelle Ngui	(Singapore)		(Singapore)	2026	2026
6	Iffah Amrin	(Singapore)	16 January 2003 (age 23)	(Singapore) BG Tampines Rovers	2026	2026
7	Fathimah Syaakirah	(Singapore)		(Singapore)	2026	2026
10	Su Jingyi	(China)		(Singapore)	2026	2026
16	Rabiatul Ardawiyah	(Singapore)		(Singapore)	2026	2026
21	Anna Vaswani	(Singapore)	21 March 2008 (age 18)	(Singapore)	2026	2026
2	K.Harini	(Singapore)	20 July 2004 (age 22)	(Singapore) Royal Arion (WNL)	2025	2025
23	Adrianna Hazeri	(Singapore)	3 July 2006 (age 20)	(Singapore) Tanjong Pagar United (W)	2025	2025
24	Hailey Cheung	(Singapore) (Hong Kong)		(Singapore)	2025	2025
25	Tasneem Khozem	(Singapore)		(Singapore)	2025	2025
	Jaslyn Leong Fei Ping	(Singapore)		(Singapore)	2024	2025
	Claire Merrow-Smith	(Singapore)		(Singapore)	2023	2025
	Rachel Liew	(Singapore)		(Singapore) Still Aerion Women's	2025	2025
Midfielders
8	Angela Hu	(Singapore)		(Singapore)	2026	2026
11	Rachel Ngui	(Singapore)		(Singapore)	2026	2026
13	Devina Beins	(Singapore)		(Singapore) Royal Aerion	2026	2026
14	Tiana Shah	(Singapore)		(Singapore)	2026	2026
19	Fatin Syarafana	(Singapore)		(Singapore) BG Tampines Rovers	2026	2026
50	Venya Jain	(Singapore)		(Singapore)	2026	2026
	Victoria Tan	(Singapore)		(Singapore)	2024	2025
	Siti Nurfarah	(Singapore)	22 August 2006 (age 20)	(Singapore) Warriors FC	2024	2025
	Winette Lim Siu	(Singapore)	20 May 1999 (age 27)	(Singapore) Tiong Bahru FC (W)	2023	2025
	Nisreen Aziz	(Singapore)	20 May 2008 (age 18)	(Singapore) ESA Academy	2025	2025
17	Lily Rozana Joehann Aung	(Singapore) (Myanmar)		(Singapore) Tiong Bahru FC (W)	2025	2025
Strikers
9	Park Claire	(South Korea)		(Singapore) Nanyang Technology University	2026	2026
12	Nadirah Jeffere	(Singapore)		(Singapore)	2026	2026
25	Nabilah Jeffere	(Singapore)		(Singapore)	2026	2026
29	Syafina Putri	(Singapore)	9 August 2004 (age 22)	(Singapore) Lion City Sailors	2024	2026
48	Grace Monago	(Singapore)		(Singapore)	2026	2026
4	Raudhah Kamis	(Singapore)	4 March 1999 (age 27)	(Singapore) Tiong Bahru FC (W)	2023	2025
20	Clae Kho Tyen Ning	(Singapore)		(Singapore) Tiong Bahru FC (W)	2025	2025
	Sydney Hector	(Canada)	27 January 1997 (age 29)	(Singapore) Balestier Khalsa (W)	2024	2025
	Faith Ho Xin Ning	(Singapore)	14 October 2005 (age 20)	(Singapore)	2024	2025
	Claire Marie Tay	(Singapore)	14 January 2000 (age 26)	(Singapore) Still Aerion Women's	2024	2025
Players who left mid-season

== Coaching staff ==
First Team

Position	Name	Ref.
General Manager	(Thailand) Preecha Prachanun	
Team Manager	(Thailand) Prat Malarat	
Technical Director	(Singapore) Akbar Nawas	
Head Coach (Men)	(Nigeria) Robert Eziakor (Interim, Till 27 October 2025) (Thailand) Pannarai Pansiri (interim)	
Assistant Coach	(Tunisia) Walid Lounis	
Goalkeeping Coach	(Malaysia) Rais Dermawan	
Fitness Coach	(Singapore) Rosman Sulaiman	
Sports Trainer	(Singapore) Thomas Pang	
Physiotherapist	(Singapore) Alif Jamal	
Equipment Team	(Singapore) Richard Lim (Singapore) Wan Azlan Bin Wan Adanan	

Youth and Women Team

Position	Name	Ref.
Head Coach (Women)	(Singapore) G.Sivaraj	
Head of Youth (COE) & U21 Coach	(Tunisia) Walid Lounis	
U17 Coach	(England) Hamid Raeiskarimi	
U15 Coach	(Singapore) Hairil Amin	
U13 Coach	(Tunisia) Walid Lounis	

== Transfers ==
=== In ===
Preseason

Date (Note: Date of club's announcement, will be either date of club announcement or 1 Jun-2025, the date which the free agent start due to lapse of previous contract)	Position	Player	Transferred from	Ref
First team
1 July 2025	GK	(Singapore) Aizil Yazid	(Singapore) Young Lions	End of NS (Note: Aizil moves back to Young Lions for a year loan)
1 July 2025	DF	(Singapore) Aqil Yazid	(Singapore) Young Lions	Free
1 July 2025	FW	(Singapore) Amir Syafiz	(Singapore) Young Lions	Free (Note: Amir Syafiz moves back to Young Lions for a year loan)
9 July 2025	GK	(Singapore) Zharfan Rohaizad	(Singapore) Lion City Sailors	Season loan
25 July 2025	GK	(Singapore) Ridhuan Barudin	(Singapore) BG Tampines Rovers	Free
25 July 2025	DF	(Singapore) Ryaan Sanizal	(Singapore) BG Tampines Rovers	Free; 2 years contract till Jun-27
25 July 2025	MF	(Singapore) Huzaifah Aziz	(Singapore) Geylang International	Free
25 July 2025	MF	(Singapore) Haiqal Pashia	(Singapore) Lion City Sailors	Free
12 August 2025	MF	(Japan) Ryohei Yoshihama	(Cambodia) Boeung Ket (C1)	Free
13 August 2025	MF	(Japan) Yuta Kikuchi	(Cambodia) Nagaworld (C1)	Free
14 August 2025	MF	(Japan) Yuma Suwa	(Montenegro) FK Bokelj (M1)	Free
15 August 2025	FW	(Spain) Víctor Blasco	(Malta) Balzan (M1)	Free
18 August 2025	DF	(United States) Sam Strong	(Cambodia) Life (C1)	Free
19 August 2025	FW	(Thailand) Settawut Wongsai	(Thailand) Phrae United (T2)	Free
20 August 2025	FW	(Thailand) Yotsakorn Burapha	(Thailand) Chonburi (T2)	Season loan
21 August 2025	DF	(Thailand) Parinya Nusong	(Thailand) Chonburi (T2)	Season loan
22 August 2025	FW	(Japan) Hugo Kametani	(Cambodia) Nagaworld (C1)	Free
23 August 2025	DF	(Thailand) Kanok Kongsimma	(Thailand) Suphanburi (T2)	Free
24 August 2025	MF	(Thailand) Chonlawit Kanuengkid	(Thailand) Chiangmai United (T2)	Free
31 August 2025	DF	(Kenya) (United States) Nabilai Kibunguchy	(United States) Sarasota Paradise (U4)	Free
SPL2, U23 & Academy
21 August 2025	GK	(Singapore) Rauf Erwan	(Singapore) Young Lions	Free
21 August 2025	DF	(Singapore) Farhan Sahlan	(Japan) Albirex Niigata (S) U21	Free
21 August 2025	DF	(Lithuania) Algirdas Karlonas	(Singapore) Lion City Sailors U17	Free
21 August 2025	DF	(Singapore) Mikhael Ismail	(Singapore) Balestier Khalsa U17	Free
21 August 2025	FW	(Singapore) Syady Sufwan	(Singapore) SAFSA	Free
Women
26 July 2025	DF	(Singapore) Nur Fathimah Syaakirah	(Singapore) BG Tampines Rovers	Free

Mid-season

Date (Note: Date of club's announcement, will be either date of club announcement or 1 Jun-2025, the date which the free agent start due to lapse of previous contract)	Position	Player	Transferred from	Ref
First team
7 January 2026	MF	(Singapore) Saifullah Akbar	(Singapore) BG Tampines Rovers	Free
13 January 2026	DF	(Ecuador) Washington Jaramillo	(Ecuador) C.D. Olmedo	Free
13 January 2026	FW	(New Caledonia) (Australia) Jaushua Sotirio	Free Agent	N.A.
14 January 2026	MF	(Thailand) Saharat Panmarchya	(Thailand) Nongbua Pitchaya	Season loan
24 January 2026	FW	(Tanzania) (Canada) (Republic of the Congo) Gloire Amanda	(Australia) Sydney Olympic FC	Free
25 January 2026	FW	(China) Yang He	(China) Yunnan Yukun	Free
14 March 2026	GK	(Singapore) Aizil Yazid	(Singapore) Young Lions	End of loan
SPL2, U23 & Academy
1 January 2026	DF	(Singapore) (Indonesia) Nasrul Pujiyono	Free Agent	N.A.
1 January 2026	DF	(Singapore) Wong Ngang Haang	(Singapore) Balestier Khalsa	Free
1 January 2026	MF	(Singapore) (Philippines) Aryan Boon	(Japan) Albirex Niigata (S)	Free
31 January 2026	DF	(Singapore) Iryan Fandi	(Singapore) SAFSA	End of NS

=== Out ===
Preseason

Date (Note: Date of club's announcement, will be either date of club announcement or 1 Jun-2025, the date which the free agent start due to lapse of previous contract)	Position	Player	Transferred To	Ref
First team
31 May 2025	MF	(Thailand) Parinya Kaochukiat	(Thailand) Chonburi F.C.	End of loan
31 May 2025	MF	(Thailand) Ratthathammanun Deeying	(Thailand) Chonburi F.C.	End of loan
3 June 2025	DF	(Singapore) Nazhiim Harman	Retired	N.A.
3 June 2025	DF	(Singapore) Danish Irfan	(Singapore) Lion City Sailors (Note: To play mainly SPL2 squad)	Free
3 June 2025	FW	(Singapore) Zamani Zamri	(Singapore) Balestier Khalsa	Free
4 June 2025	GK	(Singapore) Zaiful Nizam	(Singapore) Tanjong Pagar United	Free
4 June 2025	MF	(Japan) Shodai Yokoyama	(Singapore) Geylang International	Free
4 June 2025	FW	(Singapore) Hazzuwan Halim	(Singapore) South Avenue SC (SFL2)	Free
4 June 2025	FW	(Singapore) Gabriel Quak	Singapore Football Club (Amaetur)	Free
4 June 2025	FW	(Montenegro) (Serbia) Dejan Račić	(Indonesia) Bhayangkara	Free
5 June 2025	GK	(Singapore) Kenji Syed Rusydi	(Singapore) Tanjong Pagar United	Free
5 June 2025	MF	(Serbia) Ismail Salihović	(Serbia)	Free
6 June 2025	MF	(Singapore) Justin Hui	(Singapore) Lion City Sailors (Note: To play mainly SPL2 squad)	Free
29 June 2025	DF	(Singapore) Tajeli Salamat	(Singapore) Geylang International	Free
29 June 2025	MF	(Singapore) Shahdan Sulaiman	(Singapore) Geylang International	Free
29 June 2025	FW	(Croatia) Stjepan Plazonja	(Indonesia) Bhayangkara	Free
30 June 2025	DF	(Singapore) Nazrul Nazari	(Singapore) Geylang International	Free
30 June 2025	DF	(Brazil) Daniel Alemão	(Lithuania) DFK Dainava	Free
30 June 2025	DF	(Montenegro) (Croatia) Jovan Mugoša	(Montenegro) FK Podgorica	Free
30 June 2025	FW	(Singapore) Irfan Iskandar	(Singapore) Geylang International	Free
14 August 2025	MF	(Singapore) Zulfahmi Arifin	(Indonesia) Persis Solo	Free
31 August 2025	GK	(Singapore) Aizil Yazid	(Singapore) Young Lions	Season loan till Dec-25 (Note: Aizil moves back to Young Lions for a 1/2 year loan)
31 August 2025	DF	(Singapore) Aqil Yazid	(Singapore) Young Lions	Season loan till Dec-25 (Note: Aqil moves back to Young Lions for a 1/2 year loan)
31 August 2025	FW	(Singapore) Amir Syafiz	(Singapore) Young Lions	Season loan till Dec-25 (Note: Amir Syafiz moves back to Young Lions for a 1/2 year loan)
Women
1 August 2025	MF	(Singapore) Nasriah Ibrahim	(Singapore) Geylang International	Mid season of 2025
SPL2, U23 & Academy
31 May 2025	MF	(Singapore) Yasir Nizamudin	(Singapore) Lion City Sailors U21	End of loan
15 August 2025	DF	(Singapore) (Nigeria) Levi Faris Alfa	(Singapore) Balestier Khalsa	Free
18 August 2025	MF	(Israel) Yanir Ben Eliezer	(Singapore) Balestier Khalsa	Free
19 August 2025	MF	(Singapore) (Nepal) Rijan Rai	(Singapore) Balestier Khalsa	Free
21 August 2025	DF	(Singapore) Adam Reefdy	(Singapore) Young Lions	Free
21 August 2025	DF	(Singapore) Azrul Zatt	(Singapore)	Free
21 August 2025	DF	(Singapore) Lucas Lee	(Singapore)	Free
21 August 2025	DF	(Singapore) Graham Howarth	Retired	N.A.
21 August 2025	MF	(Singapore) Ukaishah Ilhan	(Singapore)	Free
21 August 2025	MF	(Singapore) Afiq Iqbal	(Singapore) Eastern Thunder (ISL)	Free (Note: Afiq Iqbal joins Eastern Thunder in Jan 26)
21 August 2025	MF	(Singapore) Ayan Jarique	(Singapore)	Free
21 August 2025	MF	(Singapore) Noor Hayden Isnin	(Singapore)	Free
21 August 2025	MF	(Singapore) Abdul Syahmi	(Singapore)	Free
21 August 2025	FW	(Singapore) (Nepal) Namsang Rai	(Singapore) Lion City Sailors	Free

Mid-season

Date (Note: Date of club's announcement, will be either date of club announcement or 1 Jun-2025, the date which the free agent start due to lapse of previous contract)	Position	Player	Transferred To	Ref
First team
24 October 2025	DF	(United States) Sam Strong	(Cambodia)	Free
24 October 2025	MF	(Japan) Yuta Kikuchi	(Cambodia)	Free
25 December 2025	FW	(Thailand) Yotsakorn Burapha	(Thailand) Chonburi (T2)	End of loan
10 January 2026	MF	(Japan) Ryohei Yoshihama	(Indonesia) Persiba Balikpapan	Free (Note: Ryohei Yoshihama signs for Persiba Balikpapan in July 2026.)
12 January 2026	FW	(Japan) Hugo Kametani	(Hong Kong) Sha Tin SA	Free (Note: Hugo Kametani signs for Sha Tin SA in July 2026.)
31 January 2026	MF	(Singapore) Haiqal Pashia	(Singapore)	Free
31 January 2026	MF	(Singapore) Christopher Lee	(Singapore) Young Lions	Season loan
31 January 2026	FW	(Singapore) Shahreez Basheer	(Singapore)	Free
31 January 2026	FW	(Nigeria) Frank Chiboy Ebele	(Singapore)	Free
1 February 2026	DF	(Singapore) Iryan Fandi	(Singapore) Young Lions	Season loan
1 April 2026	DF	(Singapore) (Indonesia) Nasrul Pujiyono	(Singapore) Jurong City	N.A.
Women
31 December 2025	DF	(Singapore) Angelyn Pang Yen Ping	(Singapore) Still Aerion WFC	2026 season
31 December 2025	DF	(Singapore) Jaslyn Leong Fei Ping	(Singapore)	2026 season
31 December 2025	DF	(Singapore) K.Harini	(Singapore) Unity FC	2026 season
31 December 2025	DF	(Singapore) Claire Merrow-Smith	(Singapore)	2026 season
31 December 2025	DF	(Singapore) Rachel Liew	(Singapore)	2026 season
31 December 2025	MF	(Singapore) Victoria Tan	(Singapore)	2026 season
31 December 2025	MF	(Singapore) Winette Lim Siu	(Singapore) Jungfrau Punggol	2026 season
31 December 2025	MF	(Singapore) Siti Nurfarah	(Singapore)	2026 season
31 December 2025	MF	(Singapore) Nisreen Aziz	(Singapore)	2026 season
31 December 2025	MF	(Singapore) Rochelle Chan Wan Wen	(Singapore) Geylang International	2026 season
31 December 2025	FW	(Philippines) (Singapore) Riddle Reneelyn Sison	(Singapore) Still Aerion WFC	2026 season
31 December 2025	FW	(Singapore) Zoey Chua	(Singapore) Still Aerion WFC	2026 season
31 December 2025	FW	(Singapore) Faith Ho Xin Ning	(Singapore)	2026 season
31 December 2025	FW	(Singapore) Claire Marie Tay	(Singapore)	2026 season

=== National Services ===
Pre-season

Date	Position	Player	Transferred To	Ref
SPL2, U23 & Academy
January 2024	DF	(Singapore) Iryan Fandi	(Singapore) SAFSA	NS till Jan 2026
June 2024	DF	(Singapore) Nicholas Jordan Sea	(Singapore) SAFSA	NS till July 2026
June 2024	DF	(Singapore) Gabriel Goh	(Singapore) SAFSA	NS till July 2026
August 2024	GK	(Singapore) (Vietnam) Keith Chung Wen Jie	(Singapore) SAFSA	NS till Sept 2026
October 2024	MF	(Singapore) Ajay Robson	(Singapore) SAFSA	NS till Nov 2026
October 2025	FW	(Singapore) (France) Louka Tan-Vaissiere	(Singapore) SAFSA	NS till Nov 2027

=== Retained / Extension / Promoted ===
Date	Position	Player	Ref
First team
8 August 2025	DF	(Singapore) (Netherlands) Jordan Vestering	1 years contract till Jun 2026
11 August 2025	DF	(Singapore) (England) Anders Aplin	1 years contract till Jun 2026
21 August 2025	FW	(Singapore) Farhan Zulkifli	1 years contract till Jun 2026
SPL2, U23 & Academy
21 August 2025	GK	(Singapore) Isaac Jonathan Hean-Oon Lee	Promoted
21 August 2025	GK	(Singapore) (Philippines) (Portugal) Mykel Gabriel De Rozario	Promoted
21 August 2025	DF	(Singapore) Rauf Sanizal	Promoted
21 August 2025	DF	(Singapore) Adam Ali	Promoted
21 August 2025	DF	(Singapore) Rishon Soroya	Promoted
21 August 2025	DF	(Singapore) Matin Manaf	Promoted
21 August 2025	DF	(Singapore) Iman Adli Haziq	Promoted
21 August 2025	MF	(Singapore) Brant Tan Jun Rong	Promoted
21 August 2025	MF	(Singapore) Khilfi Aniq	Promoted
21 August 2025	FW	(Singapore) Shahreez Basheer	Promoted

== Friendly ==
=== Pre-season ===
Win Draw Loss

19 July 2025 1	BG Tampines Rovers (Singapore)	4–3	(Singapore) Hougang United	Tampines
				Stadium: Our Tampines Hub

26 July 2025 2	Albirex Niigata (S) (Japan)	4–2	(Singapore) Hougang United	Jurong East
				Stadium: Jurong East Stadium

1 August 2025 3	Johor Darul Ta'zim (Malaysia)	12–0	(Singapore) Hougang United	Johor
	Arif Aiman 4'; Jairo Da Silva 7'; Hector Hevel 10'; João Figueiredo 12'; Jonathan Silva 20', 23'; Eddy Israfilov 26'; Óscar Arribas 56', 80', 84'; Romel Morales 62', 77'			Stadium: JDT Training Center

8 August 2025 4	Balestier Khalsa (Singapore)	3–2	(Singapore) Hougang United	Jalan Besar
				Stadium: Jalan Besar Stadium

=== In-season ===
20 September 2025 1	BG Tampines Rovers (Singapore)	0–2	(Singapore) Hougang United	Tampines
				Stadium: Our Tampines Hub

28 March 2026 2	Kuching City (Malaysia)	–	(Singapore) Hougang United	Kuching
				Stadium: Sarawak State Stadium

== Team statistics ==
=== Appearances and goals ===
As of 18 May 26

No.	Pos.	Player	SPL		Singapore Cup		Total	
No.	Pos.	Player	Apps.	Goals	Apps.	Goals	Apps.	Goals
2	DF	(Singapore) (England) Anders Aplin	2+4	0	0	0	6	0
3	DF	(Singapore) (Netherlands) Jordan Vestering	19+1	0	4	0	24	0
4	MF	(Thailand) Chonlawit Kanuengkid	10+8	0	4	1	22	1
5	DF	(Thailand) Kanok Kongsimma	6+1	0	1+1	0	9	0
6	MF	(Singapore) Huzaifah Aziz	16+3	1	4	0	23	1
7	MF	(Singapore) Saifullah Akbar	16	3	0	0	16	3
8	MF	(Thailand) Saharat Panmarchya	3+8	0	0	0	11	0
9	FW	(Tanzania) (Canada) (Republic of the Congo) Gloire Amanda	2	0	0	0	2	0
10	MF	(Singapore) Farhan Zulkifli	19+1	4	4	3	24	7
11	FW	(Thailand) Settawut Wongsai	13+3	5	4	2	19	7
15	DF	(Thailand) Parinya Nusong	1+5	0	2+2	1	10	1
16	MF	(Singapore) Rishon Soroya	0	0	0	0	0	0
17	DF	(Ecuador) Washington Jaramillo	13+1	0	0	0	14	0
18	GK	(Singapore) Mykel Gabriel De Rozario	0	0	0	0	0	0
19	DF	(Singapore) Rauf Sanizal	0+8	0	0+2	0	10	0
21	DF	(Singapore) Iman Adli Haziq	0	0	0	0	0	0
22	MF	(Singapore) Brant Tan Jun Rong	0+2	0	0	0	2	0
24	GK	(Singapore) Aizil Yazid	2	0	0	0	2	0
27	MF	(Singapore) Khilfi Aniq	0	0	0	0	0	0
28	GK	(Singapore) Zharfan Rohaizad	13	0	3	0	16	0
29	DF	(Singapore) Matin Manaf	0	0	0	0	0	0
30	MF	(Singapore) Farhan Sahlan	0	0	0	0	0	0
31	GK	(Singapore) Ridhuan Barudin	6+1	0	1	0	8	0
33	DF	(Singapore) Ryaan Sanizal	18+1	0	4	0	23	0
36	DF	(Kenya) (United States) Nabilai Kibunguchy	10+10	2	3+1	1	24	3
37	DF	(Singapore) Adam Ali	0	0	0	0	0	0
47	MF	(Philippines) Neil Charles Callanta	0	0	0	0	0	0
50	GK	(Singapore) Rauf Erwan	0	0	0	0	0	0
54	FW	(Singapore) Syady Sufwan	0+1	0	0	0	1	0
55	MF	(Singapore) Woo Chun Wei	0+1	0	0+1	0	2	0
57	DF	(Lithuania) Algirdas Karlonas	0+1	0	0	0	1	0
61	GK	(Singapore) Isaac Jonathan Lee	0	0	0	0	0	0
66	DF	(Singapore) Mikhael Ismail	0	0	0	0	0	0
67	FW	(Singapore) G.Sheeva	0	0	0	0	0	0
71	MF	(Singapore) Ganesan Silloren	0	0	0	0	0	0
78	MF	(Japan) Yuma Suwa	21	0	1	0	22	0
80	FW	(Spain) Víctor Blasco	16+2	3	3	0	21	3
95	FW	(New Caledonia) (Australia) Jaushua Sotirio	12+2	5	0	0	14	5
99	FW	(China) Yang He	0+4	0	0	0	4	0
Players who have played this season but had left the club on loan to other club
Players who have played this season but had left the club permanently
7	FW	(Japan) Hugo Kametani	1+4	0	2+1	0	8	0
8	FW	(Thailand) Yotsakorn Burapha	5	1	3	0	8	1
13	MF	(Japan) Yuta Kikuchi	2	0	0	0	2	0
23	DF	(United States) Sam Strong	0	0	0	0	0	0
24	MF	(Singapore) Haiqal Pashia	0	0	0+2	0	2	0
41	MF	(Japan) Ryohei Yoshihama	5	0	1+2	0	8	0
45	MF	(Nigeria) Frank Chiboy Ebele	0	0	0	0	0	0
58	FW	(Singapore) Shahreez Basheer	0	0	0	0	0	0
77	MF	(Singapore) Christopher Lee	0	0	0	0	0	0

== Competitions ==
=== Overview ===
Results summary (SPL)

Overall								Home						Away					
Pld	W	D	L	GF	GA	GD	Pts	W	D	L	GF	GA	GD	W	D	L	GF	GA	GD
0	0	0	0	0	0	0	0	0	0	0	0	0	0	0	0	0	0	0	0

=== Singapore Premier League ===
Win Draw Loss

25 August 2025 1	Lion City Sailors (Singapore)	2–1	(Singapore) Hougang United	Tampines
	Maxime Lestienne 10', 47'; Lionel Tan (yellow card) 28'; Song Ui-young (yellow card) 84'	Report	Farhan Zulkifli 29'; Anders Aplin (yellow card) 57'; Jordan Vestering (yellow card) 83'	Stadium: Our Tampines Hub (Note: Location changed due to re-turfing of Bishan Stadium); Referee: Clarence Leow; Man of the Match: (Belgium) Maxime Lestienne

2 October 2025 2 (Rescheduled)	Young Lions (Singapore)	0–2	(Singapore) Hougang United	Tampines
			Yotsakorn Burapha 50' (yellow card) 84'; Víctor Blasco 76'; Jordan Vestering (yellow card) 44'; Ryohei Yoshihama (yellow card) 90+3'	Stadium: Our Tampines Hub (Note: Location changed due to re-turfing of Jalan Besar Stadium); Referee: Farhan Mohd; Man of the Match: (Singapore) Farhan Zulkifli

19 September 2025 3	Hougang United (Singapore)	0–2	(Singapore) Geylang International	Tampines
	Kanok Kongsimma (yellow card) 18'; Anders Aplin (red card) 30'; Yuta Kikuchi (red card) 72'	Report	Riku Fukashiro 6' (yellow card) 20'; Ryoya Taniguchi 39'; Ko Jae-hyun (yellow card) 45+9'	Stadium: Our Tampines Hub; Referee: Zulfiqar Mustaffa; Man of the Match: (Singapore) Rudy Khairullah

17 October 2025 4	Hougang United (Singapore)	0–4	(Japan) Albirex Niigata (S)	Jurong East
	Kanok Kongsimma (yellow card) 15'; Huzaifah Aziz (yellow card) 71' (yellow-red card) 84'	Report	Shingo Nakano 24', 45+4'; Nicky Melvin Singh 81', 87'	Stadium: Jurong East Stadium; Referee: Andrea Verolino; Man of the Match: (Japan) Shingo Nakano

27 October 2025 5 (Rescheduled)	Hougang United (Singapore)	1–2	(Singapore) BG Tampines Rovers	Tampines
	Syazwan Buhari 86' (o.g.); Ryaan Sanizal (yellow card) 66'; Jordan Vestering (yellow card) 79'	Report	Faris Ramli 78'; Irfan Najeeb 90+4'; Shuya Yamashita (yellow card) 69'	Stadium: Our Tampines Hub; Referee: Jansen Foo; Man of the Match: (Singapore) Faris Ramli

18 May 2026 6 (Rescheduled)	Tanjong Pagar United (Singapore)	2–1	(Singapore) Hougang United	Jurong East
	Anaqi Ismit 90+1' (yellow card) 88'; Zenivio 90+7' (yellow card) 90+7'; Kim Li-Kwan (yellow card) 43'		Saifullah Akbar 65' (yellow card) 78'; Nabilai Kibunguchy (yellow card) 34'; Huzaifah Aziz (yellow card) 36'; Chonlawit Kanuengkid (yellow card) 40'	Stadium: Jurong East Stadium; Referee: Taufik Thana; Man of the Match: (Timor-Leste) Zenivio

18 January 2026 7	Balestier Khalsa (Singapore)	2–3	(Singapore) Hougang United	Bishan
	Bogdan Mandić 5'; Zharfan Rohaizad 8' (o.g.); Mario Subarić (red card) 34'; Tajeli Salamat (yellow card) 55'		Settawut Wongsai 11'; Víctor Blasco 78'; Nabilai Kibunguchy 80'	Stadium: Bishan Stadium; Referee: Zulfiqar Mustaffa; Man of the Match: (Spain) Víctor Blasco

24 January 2026 8	Hougang United (Singapore)	1–5; Awarded (Note: Hougang United v Lion City Sailors, originally won 5–1 by Lion City Sailors, was forfeited and awarded 5–1 to Lion City Sailors by the FAS Disciplinary Committee on 3 Mar 2026, as Hougang United fielded Gloire Amanda, even though he has not completed the required regulatory clearances relating to his work pass status. FAS commented that the scorelines will either remain as recorded or be adjusted to 3–0, whichever reflects the greater margin,)	(Singapore) Lion City Sailors	Bishan
	Settawut Wongsai 11'; Huzaifah Aziz (yellow card) 52'	Report	Shawal Anuar 18'; Ryaan Sanizal 27' (o.g.); Lennart Thy 32'; Bart Ramselaar 65', 72'; Kyoga Nakamura (yellow card) 39'; Akram Azman (yellow card) 43'	Stadium: Bishan Stadium (Note: Location changed due to swopping of stadium with LCS upon completion of returfing of Jalan Besar Stadium); Referee: Syarqawi Buhari; Man of the Match: (Netherlands) Bart Ramselaar

30 January 2026 9	Hougang United (Singapore)	0–3; Awarded (Note: Hougang United v Young Lions, originally won 2–0 by Hougang United, was forfeited and awarded 3–0 to Young Lions by the FAS Disciplinary Committee on 3 Mar 2026, as Hougang United fielded Gloire Amanda, even though he has not completed the required regulatory clearances relating to his work pass status.)	(Singapore) Young Lions	Bishan
	Settawut Wongsai 30'; Victor Blasco 73' (pen.) (yellow card) 64'; Saifullah Akbar (yellow card) 20'; Huzaifah Aziz (yellow card) 39'; Yuma Suwa (yellow card) 50'	Report	Joilson Lucas (yellow card) 60'	Stadium: Bishan Stadium; Referee: Ahmad A'Qashah; Man of the Match: (Singapore) Ryaan Sanizal

9 February 2026 10	Albirex Niigata (S) (Japan)	2–1	(Singapore) Hougang United	Jurong East
	Shingo Nakano 13'; Ryang Hyon-ju 43'; Hassan Sunny (yellow card) 90'	Report	Jaushua Sotirio 51' (yellow card) 90'; Huzaifah Aziz (yellow card) 68'; Victor Blasco (yellow card) 90+3'	Stadium: Jurong East Stadium; Referee: Thawfeek Ahamad; Man of the Match: (Japan) Shingo Nakano

15 February 2026 11	Geylang International (Singapore)	1–2	(Singapore) Hougang United	Tampines
	Ryoya Taniguchi 61'; Shodai Yokoyama (yellow card) 90+5'		Jaushua Sotirio 54'; Settawut Wongsai 83' (yellow card) 79'; Farhan Zulkifli (yellow card) 27'; Ryaan Sanizal (yellow card) 73'; Washington Jaramillo (yellow card) 80'	Stadium: Our Tampines Hub; Referee: Khairul Amri; Man of the Match: (Singapore) Farhan Zulkifli

23 February 2026 12	Hougang United (Singapore)	3–0	(Singapore) Tanjong Pagar United	Bishan
	Settawut Wongsai 26'; Jaushua Sotirio 32'; Farhan Zulkifli 67'; Chonlawit Kanuengkid (yellow card) 45'; Victor Blasco (yellow card) 60'; Yang He (yellow card) 73'; Zharfan Rohaizad (yellow card) 90+3'		Raihan Rahman (yellow card) 41'; Emilio Estevez (yellow card) 42'; Anaqi Ismit (yellow card) 45+4'; Lee Chan-woo (yellow card) 47'; Azim Akbar (yellow card) 90+3'	Stadium: Bishan Stadium; Referee: Clarence Leow; Man of the Match: (Singapore) Farhan Zulkifli

27 February 2026 13	BG Tampines Rovers (Singapore)	3–0	(Singapore) Hougang United	Tampines
	Hide Higashikawa 48'; Koya Kazama 64'; Trent Buhagiar 90+6' (yellow card) 72'	Report	Settawut Wongsai (red card) 45+5'; Nabilai Kibunguchy (yellow card) 90+4'	Stadium: Our Tampines Hub; Referee: Ahmad A'Qashah; Man of the Match: (Australia) Trent Buhagiar

9 March 2026 14	Hougang United (Singapore)	1–2	(Singapore) Balestier Khalsa	Bishan
	Hafiz Ahmad 21' (o.g.); Huzaifah Aziz (yellow card) 34'; Ryaan Sanizal (red card) 44'; Saharat Panmarchya (yellow card) 90+4'		Tin Matić 55'; Jakov Katuša 67'; Harith Kanadi (yellow card) 37'; Masahiro Sugita (yellow card) 71'; Lazar Vujanic (yellow card) 82'	Stadium: Bishan Stadium; Referee: Zulfiqar Mustaffa; Man of the Match: (Croatia) Jakov Katuša

14 March 2026 15	Young Lions (Singapore)	0–2	(Singapore) Hougang United	Jalan Besar
	Luth Harith (yellow card) 13'; Danial Herwan (yellow card) 79'; Abner Vinicius (yellow card) 90+3'		Nabilai Kibunguchy 55'; Jaushua Sotirio 57'	Stadium: Jalan Besar Stadium; Referee: Oswind Suriya

4 April 2026 16	Hougang United (Singapore)	0–1	(Singapore) Geylang International	Bishan
	Víctor Blasco (yellow card) 25'; Washington Jaramillo (yellow card) 45+5'		Ryoya Taniguchi 5'; Kim Tae-ho (yellow card) 90+3'	Stadium: Bishan Stadium; Referee: Jansen Foo; Man of the Match: (Japan) Shuhei Hoshino

12 April 2026 17	Lion City Sailors (Singapore)	4–1	(Singapore) Hougang United	Jalan Besar
	Lennart Thy 37' (pen.); Shawal Anuar 46'; Toni Datković 60' (yellow card) 19'; Anderson Lopes 90+1'		Huzaifah Aziz 9' (yellow card) 86'; Ridhuan Barudin (yellow card) 36'; Yuma Suwa (yellow card) 75'	Stadium: Jalan Besar Stadium; Referee: Farhan Mohd; Man of the Match: (Cameroon) (Germany) Tsiy-William Ndenge

18 April 2026 18	Hougang United (Singapore)	0–4	(Japan) Albirex Niigata (S)	Bishan
	Saifullah Akbar (yellow card) 16'; Jaushua Sotirio (yellow card) 58'; Victor Blasco (yellow card) 76'	Report	Shingo Nakano 33', 55'; Ryang Hyon-ju 56', 60'; Komei Iida (yellow card) 29'; Zulqarnaen Suzliman (yellow card) 68'	Stadium: Bishan Stadium; Referee: Khairul Amri; Man of the Match: (Japan) Shingo Nakano

27 April 2026 19	Balestier Khalsa (Singapore)	0–3	(Singapore) Hougang United	Bishan
	Fudhil I'yadh (yellow card) 21'; Masahiro Sugita (yellow card) 90+1'		Saifullah Akbar 2'; Jaushua Sotirio 4'; Farhan Zulkifli 52'; Ridhuan Barudin (yellow card) 34'	Stadium: Bishan Stadium; Referee: Clarence Leow; Man of the Match: (Singapore) Saifullah Akbar

5 May 2026 20	Tanjong Pagar United (Singapore)	1–2	(Singapore) Hougang United	Jurong East
	Emilio Estevez 58'; Vabio Canavaro (yellow card) 56'; Lee Chan-woo (yellow card) 74'; Syed Akmal (yellow card) 90+4'		Saifullah Akbar 44' (yellow card) 72'; Farhan Zulkifli 90+1'; Victor Blasco (yellow card) 36' (penalty missed) 78	Stadium: Jurong East Stadium; Referee: Syarqawi Buhari; Man of the Match: (Singapore) Farhan Zulkifli

10 May 2026 21	Hougang United (Singapore)	0–1	(Singapore) BG Tampines Rovers	Bishan
	Jordan Vestering (yellow card) 39'; Ryaan Sanizal (red card) 51'; Victor Blasco (red card) 70'; Anders Aplin (yellow card) 90'		Saifullah Akbar 82' (o.g.); Trent Buhagiar (yellow card) 43'; Shuya Yamashita (yellow card) 65'	Stadium: Bishan Stadium; Referee: Jansen Foo; Man of the Match: (Singapore) Ridhuan Barudin

Pos	Team	Pld	W	D	L	GF	GA	GD	Pts	Qualification or relegation
1	Lion City Sailors (C)	21	16	3	2	70	14	+56	51	Qualification for the AFC Champions League Two (Note: As league champions Lion City Sailors also won the 2025–26 Singapore Cup, the continental place allocated to the cup winners passed to league runners-up BG Tampines Rovers.)
2	BG Tampines Rovers	21	15	4	2	58	21	+37	49	Qualification for the AFC Champions League Two
3	Albirex Niigata (S)	21	15	2	4	47	19	+28	47	
4	Balestier Khalsa	21	11	2	8	44	46	−2	35	
5	Geylang International	21	7	3	11	29	42	−13	24	
6	Hougang United	21	7	0	14	24	41	−17	21	
7	Young Lions (Note: Young Lions were not eligible to qualify for AFC club competitions.)	21	2	3	16	15	58	−43	9	
8	Tanjong Pagar United	21	2	1	18	17	63	−46	7	

Source: Singapore Premier League
Rules for classification: 1) Points; 2) goal difference; 3) goals scored; 4) wins
(C) Champions

=== Singapore Cup ===
==== Round 1 ====
7 November 2025 Rd 1 Match 1	Tanjong Pagar United (Singapore)	2–3	(Singapore) Hougang United	Jurong East
	Youssef Ezzejjari 83' (pen.); Bruno Dybal 89' (yellow card) 45+1'; Raihan Rahman (yellow card) 53'; Lim Hyun-Sub (yellow card) 90+7'		Farhan Zulkifli 10'; Settawut Wongsai 19', 64'; Yuma Suwa (red card) 51'; Víctor Blasco (yellow card) 84'; Parinya Nusong (yellow card) 87'	Stadium: Jurong East Stadium; Referee: Mazlan Pagira; Man of the Match: (Singapore) Farhan Zulkifli

22 November 2025 Rd 1 Match 2	Hougang United (Singapore)	3–0	(Singapore) Geylang International	Tampines
	Nabilai Kibunguchy 69' (yellow card) 90+8'; Farhan Zulkifli 73'; Chonlawit Kanuengkid 77'; Víctor Blasco (yellow card) 17'; Huzaifah Aziz (yellow card) 88'		Gareth Low (yellow card) 85'	Stadium: Our Tampines Hub; Referee: Taufik Thana; Man of the Match: (Singapore) Farhan Zulkifli

29 November 2025 Rd 1 Match 3	Hougang United (Singapore)	1–1	(Japan) Albirex Niigata (S)	Tampines
	Parinya Nusong 20'; Jordan Vestering (yellow card) 37'		Shingo Nakano 64'; Takumi Yokohata (yellow card) 5'	Stadium: Our Tampines Hub; Referee: Farhan Mohd; Man of the Match: (Singapore) Zharfan Rohaizad

7 December 2025 Rd 1 Match 4	Balestier Khalsa (Singapore)	2–1	(Singapore) Hougang United	Bishan
	Tin Matić 45+1'; Ignatius Ang 54'; Lazar Vujanic (yellow card) 33'; Daniel Goh (yellow card) 78'		Farhan Zulkifli 62' (red card) 90+9'; Settawut Wongsai (yellow card) 36'; Huzaifah Aziz (yellow card) 90+11'	Stadium: Bishan Stadium; Referee: Thaufeek Ahmad; Man of the Match: (Croatia) Tin Matic

== Competition (SPL2) ==
Win Draw Loss

1 September 2025 1	Hougang United (Singapore)	1–1	(Singapore) Geylang International	Tampines
	Settawut Wongsai 60'; G.Sheeva (yellow card) 1'; Isaac Lee (red card) 6'; Adam Ali (yellow card) 16'; Khilfi Aniq (yellow card) 85'		Irfan Iskandar 68'	Stadium: Our Tampines Hub; Referee: Khairul Amri

9 September 2025 2	Tanjong Pagar United (Singapore)	0–3	(Singapore) Hougang United	Jurong East
	Risvi Aaqil (yellow card) 12'; Farid Jafiri (yellow card) 89'		Hugo Kametani 53', 61'; Settawut Wongsai 75'; Kanok Kongsimma (yellow card) 38'; Huzaifah Aziz (yellow card) 46'; Chonlawit Kanuengkid (yellow card) 89'	Stadium: Jurong East Stadium; Referee: Mazlan Pagira

30 September 2025 3	Hougang United (Singapore)	0–2	(Singapore) Young Lions	Choa Chu Kang
	Rauf Sanizal (yellow card) 28'; Khilfi Aniq (yellow card) 50'; Yuta Kikuchi (yellow card) 55'; Chun Wei Woo (yellow card) 90+4'		Iliya Naufal Idris 59' (yellow card) 32'; Ilyasin Zayan 85'	Stadium: Choa Chu Kang Stadium; Referee: Yazid Abdul Latiff

6 October 2025 4	Hougang United (Singapore)	2–2	(Singapore) Lion City Sailors	Choa Chu Kang
	Hugo Kametani 14'; Haiqal Pashia 79'; Víctor Blasco (yellow card) 58'; Rishon Soroya (yellow card) 67'		Abdul Rasaq 16', 85'; Adam Faisal (yellow card) 28'; Zulqarnaen Suzliman (yellow card) 55'; Danish Irfan Azman (yellow card) 82'	Stadium: Choa Chu Kang Stadium; Referee: Aldrick Lee

13 October 2025 5	Albirex Niigata (S) (Japan)	3–0	(Singapore) Hougang United	Jurong East
	Nicky Melvin Singh 67', 71'; Sim Jun Yen 90' (yellow card) 88'		Syady Sufwan (yellow card) 45+2'; Adam Ali (yellow card) 48'	Stadium: Jurong East Stadium; Referee: Taufik Thana

29 October 2025 6	Hougang United (Singapore)	0–2	(Singapore) BG Tampines Rovers	Choa Chu Kang
	Rauf Sanizal (yellow card) 12'; Adam Ali (yellow card) 65'; Ganesan Silloren (red card) 76'; Syady Sufwan (yellow card) 82'		Shafrel Ariel 27'; Tallo Ngao 62'; Kegan Phang (yellow card) 76'	Stadium: Choa Chu Kang Stadium; Referee: Thawfeek Ahamad

11 November 2025 7	Balestier Khalsa (Singapore)	3–1	(Singapore) Hougang United	Bishan
	Tiago Martins 33', 41'; Karthigaya Varmaan 70'		Syady Sufwan 9'; Adam Ali (yellow card) 81'	Stadium: Bishan Stadium; Referee: Andrea Verolino

18 November 2025 8	Geylang International (Singapore)	1–1	(Singapore) Hougang United	Tampines
	Ryu Hardy Yussri 16' (yellow card) 22'; Irfan Iskandar (yellow card) 55'; Sho Gamo (yellow card) 88'; Nizwan Izzairie (yellow card) 90'		Matin Manaf 71' (yellow card) 76'; Rishon Soroya (yellow card) 59'	Stadium: Our Tampines Hub; Referee: Mazlan Pagira

3 December 2025 9	Hougang United (Singapore)	2–3	(Singapore) Balestier Khalsa	Bishan
	Yuma Suwa 80', 90'; Rishon Soroya (yellow card) 90'		Ifat Sha'aban 25', 65'; Harris Ilhan 69'; Karthigaya Varmaan (yellow card) 22'; Firdaus Roslan (yellow card) 82'	Stadium: Bishan Stadium; Referee: Taufik Thana

13 November 2025 10 (Rescheduled)	Young Lions (Singapore)	1–2	(Singapore) Hougang United	Tampines
	Iliya Naufal Idris 11'; Casey Klein (yellow card) 34'; Ikram Mikhail Mustaqim (yellow card) 55'; Idzham Eszuan (yellow card) 81'; Ryan Vishal (yellow card) 89'		Farhan Sahlan 9'; Khilfi Aniq 41' (yellow card) 57'; Brant Tan (yellow card) 42'	Stadium: Our Tampines Hub; Referee: Jansen Foo

5 January 2026 11	Lion City Sailors (Singapore)	2–3	(Singapore) Hougang United	Bishan
	Namsang Rai 45'; Ikmal Hazlan 59' (yellow card) 77'; Adam Faisal (yellow card) 44'		Chonlawit Kanuengkid 38'; Syady Sufwan 71' (pen.); Khilfi Aniq 89'; Kanok Kongsimma (yellow card) 48'; Brant Tan (yellow card) 74'; G. Jeeva (yellow card) 90'	Stadium: Bishan Stadium; Referee: Aldrick Lee

14 January 2026 12	Hougang United (Singapore)	5–2	(Japan) Albirex Niigata (S)	Jurong East
	Jaushua Sotirio 10'; Washington Jaramillo 57', 62'; Farhan Zulkifli 73'; Settawut Wongsai 83'; Anders Aplin (yellow card) 28'; Jordan Vestering (yellow card) 66'		Ryaan Sanizal 50' (o.g.); Liska Iskandar 90'; Soshi Kadowaki (yellow card) 22'; Jaden Heng (yellow card) 61'	Stadium: Jurong East Stadium; Referee: Sahmadi Nawawi

21 January 2026 13	BG Tampines Rovers (Singapore)	0–3; Awarded (Note: BG Tampines Rovers v Hougang United, originally won 1–0 by Hougang United, was forfeited and awarded 3–0 to BG Tampines by the AFC Disciplinary Committee on 3 Mar 2026, as Hougang United fielded Gloire Amanda, even though he has not completed the required regulatory clearances relating to his work pass status.)	(Singapore) Hougang United	Bishan
	Zheng Wu Lim (yellow card) 88'		Chonlawit Kanuengkid 38'; Kanok Kongsimma (yellow card) 58'; Parinya Nusong (yellow card) 67'	Stadium: Bishan Stadium; Referee: Oswind Suriya

27 January 2026 14	Hougang United (Singapore)	0–2	(Singapore) Tanjong Pagar United	Jurong East
	Matin Manaf (yellow card) 13'; Nasrul Pujiyono (yellow card) 35'; Algirdas Karlonas (yellow card) 45'; G. Jeeva (yellow card) 85'; Khilfi Aniq (yellow card) 90'		Sahil Suhaimi 2', 28'; Guilherme Rodrigues (yellow card) 75'	Stadium: Jurong East Stadium; Referee: Yazid Abdul Latiff

3 February 2026 15	Hougang United (Singapore)	1–4	(Singapore) Geylang International	Tampines
	Nasrul Pujiyono 36'; Farhan Sahlan (yellow card) 45'; Syady Sufwan (yellow card) 63'; Kanok Kongsimma (yellow card) 89'		Timothy Cheng 6', 50'; Prince Rio Rifae'i 66'; Abdusukur Abduryim 68'; Ryu Hardy (yellow card) 33'; Faisal Shahril (yellow card) 65'; Pathyn Banesh (yellow card) 80'	Stadium: Our Tampines Hub; Referee: Faris Abdul Rahman

24 February 2026 16	Balestier Khalsa (Singapore)	1–1	(Singapore) Hougang United	Bishan
	Hugh Alexander Lobsey 88'; Dany Irfan (yellow card) 55'; Syafi Hilman (yellow card) 60'; Aniq Raushan (yellow card) 82'		Saharat Panmarchya 54'; Parinya Nusong (yellow card) 43'; Chun Wei Woo (yellow card) 82'; Aryan Boon (yellow card) 85'; Syady Sufwan (yellow card) 87'	Stadium: Bishan Stadium; Referee: Yazid Abdul Latiff

17 March 2026 17	Hougang United (Singapore)	2–3	(Singapore) Young Lions	Jalan Besar
	Woo Chun Wei 83'; Ryaan Sanizal 89'; Aizil Yazid (yellow card) 19'		Garv Sahoo 11', 47'; Abner Vinicius 38' (pen.)	Stadium: Jalan Besar Stadium; Referee: Taufik Thana

31 March 2026 18	Hougang United (Singapore)	2–1	(Singapore) Lion City Sailors	Jalan Besar
	Wong Ngang Haang 77'; Chonlawit Kanuengkid 81'; Ganesan Silloren (yellow card) 19'; Matin Manaf (yellow card) 20'; Brant Tan (yellow card) 45'; Syady Sufwan (yellow card) 83'; Chun Wei Woo (yellow card) 90+1'		Ahmad Danial 10'; Ikmal Hazlan (yellow card) 19'; Raiyan Izdihar (yellow card) 57'	Stadium: Jalan Besar Stadium; Referee: Oswind Suriya

7 April 2026 19	Albirex Niigata (S) (Japan)	4–1	(Singapore) Hougang United	Jurong East
	Naoki Yoshioka 44'; Helmi Shahrol 72'; Syukri Bashir 75', 87'; Aqil Zafri (yellow card) 77'		Farhan Sahlan 77'; Syady Sufwan (yellow card) 74'; G. Jeeva (yellow card) 87'	Stadium: Jurong East Stadium; Referee: Khairul Amri

14 April 2026 20	Hougang United (Singapore)	0–1	(Singapore) BG Tampines Rovers	Tampines
	Khilfi Aniq (yellow card) 27'; Kanok Kongsimma (yellow card) 52' (red card) 77'; Matin Manaf (yellow card) 60'		Tallo Ngao 80' (pen.) (yellow card) 85'; Ong Yu En (yellow card) 65'; Iman Hakim (yellow card) 90+5'	Stadium: Our Tampines Hub; Referee: Faris Abdul Rahman

21 April 2026 21	Tanjong Pagar United (Singapore)	2–1	(Singapore) Hougang United	Jurong East
	Azim Akbar 30'; Sahil Suhaimi 90' (yellow card) 42'; Naufal Ilham (yellow card) 21'; Aloysius Pang (yellow card) 88'		Ganesan Silloren 45'; Algirdas Karlonas (yellow card) 62'	Stadium: Jurong East Stadium; Referee: Syarqawi Buhari

Pos	Team	Pld	W	D	L	GF	GA	GD	Pts	Qualification or relegation
1	Albirex Niigata (S) II	21	14	1	6	50	23	+27	43	Inaugural Champion
2	Young Lions B	21	13	1	7	52	31	+21	40	
3	BG Tampines Rovers II	21	12	2	7	46	30	+16	38	
4	Geylang International II	21	9	4	8	36	38	−2	31	
5	Tanjong Pagar United II	21	9	3	9	34	43	−9	30	
6	Lion City Sailors II	21	7	2	12	35	41	−6	23	
7	Hougang United II	21	5	4	12	28	43	−15	19	
8	Balestier Khalsa II	21	5	3	13	25	57	−32	18	

First match(es) will be played: 7 May 2026. Source: Singapore Premier League
Rules for classification: 1) points; 2) goal difference; 3) number of goals scored; 4) number of wins
