= Verzura =

Verzura is an Italian surname. Notable people with the surname include:

- Antonio Verzura (born 1992), Thailand-born Italian footballer
- Gionata Verzura (born 1992), Thailand-born Italian footballer, twin brother of Antonio
