= Chonlawit Kanuengkid =

Thai footballer (born 1992)

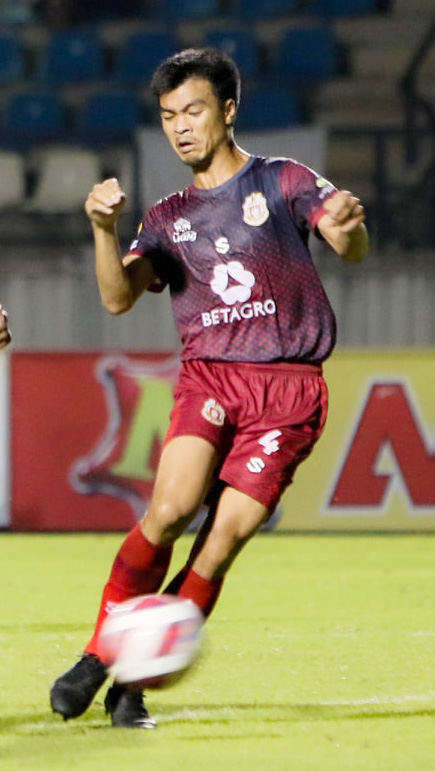
- Chonlawit Kanuengkid playing for Lamphun Warrior.

Personal information
- Full name: Chonlawit Kanuengkid
- Date of birth: 30 December 1992 (age 33)
- Place of birth: Phayao, Thailand
- Height: 1.68 m (5 ft 6 in)
- Position: Defensive midfielder

Team information
- Current team: Uttaradit

Youth career
- Chiangrai United: 2014–2017

Senior career*
Years	Team	Apps	(Gls)
2018–2021	Chiangrai United	6	(0)
2019	→ Chiangmai (loan)	3	(0)
2020-2021	→ Phrae United (loan)	22	(1)
2021–2024	Lamphun Warrior	34	(3)
2023–2024	→ Chiangmai United (loan)	32	(2)
2024–2025	Chiangmai United	30	(1)
2025–2026	Hougang United	18	(0)
2026–	Uttaradit	0	(0)
- * Club domestic league appearances and goals as of 04:59, 11 March 2026 (UTC)

Chonlawit Kanuengkid (Thai: ชลวิทย์ คนึงคิด, born December 30, 1992) is a Thai professional footballer who plays as a defensive midfielder for Thai League 2 club Uttaradit.

== Club career ==
=== Chiangrai United ===
In his first season with Thai League 1 club Chiangrai United, he helped the club to win the 2018 Thai FA Cup coming on as a substitute for Suriya Singmui.

=== Hougang United ===
On 25 July 2025, Chonlawit moved to Singapore Premier League club Hougang United.

== Honours ==
=== Club ===
==== Chiangrai United ====
- Thai FA Cup: 2018

==== Lamphun Warriors ====
- Thai League 2: 2021–22
