= Wuttikrai Pathan =

Thai footballer (born 1995)

Personal information
- Full name: Wuttikrai Pathan
- Date of birth: 9 January 1995 (age 31)
- Place of birth: Bangkok, Thailand
- Height: 1.78 m (5 ft 10 in)
- Position: Defensive midfielder

Team information
- Current team: Chiangmai F.C.
- Number: 9

Youth career
- 2012–2016: Buriram United

Senior career*
Years	Team	Apps	(Gls)
2017–2018	Buriram United	0	(0)
2018	Yangpyeong	3	(0)
2018–2020	Chainat Hornbill	14	(0)
2020–2021	Trat	0	(0)
2021–2022	MOF Customs United	12	(0)
2022–2024	Pattani	34	(1)
2024–	Chiangmai	0	(0)
- * Club domestic league appearances and goals

Wuttikrai Pathan (Thai: วุฒิไกร ปาทาน; born 9 January 1995) is a Thai professional footballer who plays as a defensive midfielder for Thai League 3 club Chiangmai.
