= Supakit Jinajai =

Thai footballer (born 1979)

Personal information
- Full name: Supakit Jinajai
- Date of birth: 6 October 1979 (age 47)
- Place of birth: Chiang Mai, Thailand
- Height: 1.67 m (5 ft 5 1/2 in)
- Position: Forward

Youth career
- 1995–1997: Prince Royal's College

Senior career*
Years	Team	Apps	(Gls)
1998–2003	Chiangmai Calibre	71	(41)
2003	Sembawang Rangers	8	(0)
2004	Chiangmai Calibre	15	(4)
2005–2012	Buriram United	123	(38)
2010–2011	→ Buriram (loan)	18	(5)
2013	Lamphun Warrior	12	(2)
2013	Chiangmai	7	(0)
Total		254	(90)
- * Club domestic league appearances and goals

Supakit Jinajai (Thai: ศุภกิจ จินะใจ; born 6 October 1979), simply known as Pop (Thai: ป๊อป) is a Thai retired professional footballer who played as a forward.

== Honours ==
=== Club ===
Provincial Electricity Authority

- Thai Premier League (1): 2008

Buriram

- Regional League Division 2 (1): 2010
- Thai Division 1 League (1): 2011
