= Anukorn Sangrum =

Thai footballer (born 1984)

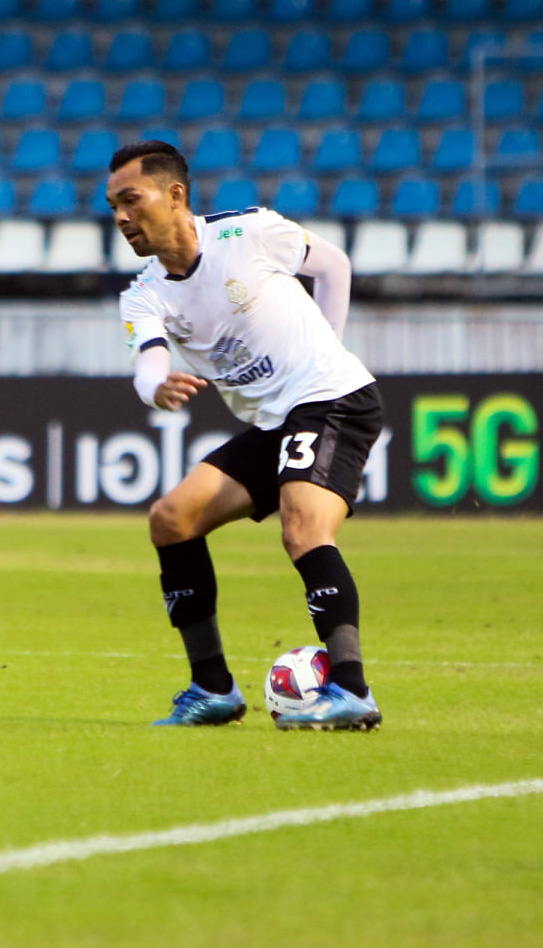

Personal information
- Date of birth: 2 October 1984 (age 42)
- Place of birth: Buriram, Thailand
- Height: 1.75 m (5 ft 9 in)
- Position: Left-back

Team information
- Current team: Nara United

Senior career*
Years	Team	Apps	(Gls)
2009–2010	Buriram	0	(0)
2011–2012	Phattalung	0	(0)
2013	Rayong	0	(0)
2014	Krabi	0	(0)
2015–2017	Ubon UMT United	19	(6)
2018–2019	Rayong	21	(0)
2020–2025	Nakhon Pathom United	98	(0)
2026–	Nara United	0	(0)
- * Club domestic league appearances and goals as of 3 April 2026

Anukorn Sangrum (Thai: อนุกรณ์ สางรัมย์, born October 2, 1984), simply known as Fang (Thai: ฟ่าง), is a Thai professional footballer who plays as a left-back for Thai League 3 club Nara United.

== Clubs ==
Senior

Year	Club	League
2009-2010	Buriram	Regional League Division 2
2011	Phattalung	Regional League Division 2
2012	Phattalung	Thai Division 1 League
2013	Rayong	Thai Division 1 League
2014	Krabi	Thai Division 1 League
2015	Ubon UMT United	Regional League Division 2

== Honours ==
=== Club ===
Buriram

- Regional League Division 2: 2010

Ubon UMT United

- Regional League Division 2: 2015

Nakhon Pathom United

- Thai League 2: 2022–23
