= Wasan Mala =

Thai footballer (born 1999)

Personal information
- Full name: Wasan Mala
- Date of birth: 24 June 1999 (age 27)
- Place of birth: Thailand
- Position: Defensive midfielder

Senior career*
Years	Team	Apps	(Gls)
2018–2019	Air Force Central	5	(0)
2020	Uthai Thani		

International career
- Thailand U21
- * Club domestic league appearances and goals

Wasan Mala (Thai: วสันต์ มาลา;) is a Thai footballer who plays as a defensive-midfielder. Mala played five times for Air Force Central in Thai League 1 during the 2018 season.
