= Efrain Rintaro =

Brazilian footballer (born 1991)

Efrain Rintaro エフライン・リンタロウ
Personal information
- Full name: Efrain Rintaro da Silva
- Date of birth: 23 July 1991 (age 35)
- Place of birth: Curitiba, Brazil
- Height: 1.87 m (6 ft 1 1/2 in)
- Position: Forward

Team information
- Current team: Chiangmai
- Number: 99

Youth career
- 2007–2009: Chukyo High School

Senior career*
Years	Team	Apps	(Gls)
2010–2012	Kashiwa Reysol	0	(0)
2011	→ FC Gifu (loan)	2	(0)
2012	→ Blaublitz Akita (loan)	27	(3)
2013	FC Ryukyu	19	(3)
2014	Veertien Kuwana	9	(12)
2015–2016	ReinMeer Aomori	46	(11)
2017–2021	Suzuka Point Getters	76	(44)
2022–2025	FC Osaka	20	(3)
2023	→ Veertien Mie (loan)	5	(0)
2024	→ Shan United (loan)	19	(8)
2025	Shan United		
2026–	Chiangmai	13	(7)
- * Club domestic league appearances and goals

Efrain Rintaro da Silva (エフライン・リンタロウ・ダ・シルバ, Efurain Rintarou Da Shiruba), commonly known as Efrain Rintaro (エフライン・リンタロウ, Efurain Rintarou; born 23 July 1991) is a Brazilian professional footballer who plays as a forward for Chiangmai.

== Career ==
Rintaro began his career in Brazil, he joined a club team from the age of 7, and at the age of 14, he came to Japan with his parents and older sister and began living in an apartment complex in Minato-ku, Nagoya. After that, his friend invited him to a soccer class hosted by the Nagoya International Center.

Rintaro joined Kashiwa Reysol in 2010 after graduating from Chukyo High School. In the 2011 season, he transferred to J2 League club, FC Gifu on a temporary basis and made his first appearance in the J. League in the 22nd minute of the second half of the match against Oita Trinita in the J2 League matchweek 36 on November 20 of the same year. In the 2012 season, he transferred to JFL club, Blaublitz Akita on loan and participated in 27 games. After the end of the season, he left Kashiwa when his contract expired.

In 2013, he transferred to JFL club FC Ryukyu and participated in 19 games. He left after the season when his contract expired.

In April 2014, he transferred to Veertien Kuwana (now Veertien Mie renamed from 2015) in the first division of Mie Prefecture.

In 2015, he moved to Reinmeer Aomori. He scored two goals in the 2015 regional league finals, contributing to Aomori's victory and promotion to the JFL. He played 28 games in the 2016 JFL, but left the team after his contract expired at the end of the season.

Rintaro transferred to Suzuka Unlimited FC from 2017 (now Suzuka Point Getters renamed from 2020). In 2018, Rintaro contributed to the club's promotion to the JFL with 3 goals, the most in the 2018 Japanese Regional Champions League. In 2019, he scored 18 goals in the domestic league and won the JFL top scorer.

On 7 January 2022, Rintaro officially transfer to FC Osaka for 2022 season. On 20 November at same year, he helped to brought his club promotion to the J3 League for the first time in history. On 11 December at same year, Rintaro has renewed contract with club and will continue to play for FC Osaka in the 2023 season.

On 17 August 2023, he was loaned out to Japan Football League club Veertien Mie. During the 2023 season, as a FC Osaka player, he only featured in a single match, coming off the bench against Ehime FC back on March. He indirectly introduced this lack of playing time as the key factor behind the move. His loan period expires at 31 January 2024.

In 2024, Rintaro joined to Myanmar National League club, Shan United on loan.

Shan United was announce permanent transfer of Rintaro for 2025 season after loan has been confirmed.

== Personal life ==
Rintaro was born in Curitiba, Brazil. He is part of the third generation of Japanese Brazilians, whose maternal grandparents have immigrated from Japan.

== Career statistics ==
As of 17 August 2023.

Appearances and goals by club, season and competition
Club	Season	League			Emperor's Cup		Total	
Club	Season	Division	Apps	Goals	Apps	Goals	Apps	Goals
Kashiwa Reysol	2010	J2 League	0	0	0	0	0	0
FC Gifu (loan)	2011	J2 League	2	0	0	0	2	0
Blaublitz Akita (loan)	2012	JFL	27	3	0	0	27	3
FC Ryukyu	2013	JFL	19	3	1	0	20	3
Veertien Kuwana	2014	Mie Prefectural League	9	12	1	0	10	12
ReinMeer Aomori	2015	JRL (Tohoku, Div. 1)	18	8	1	0	19	8
ReinMeer Aomori	2016	JFL	28	3	–		28	3
Suzuka Unlimited FC	2017	JRL (Tōkai, Div. 1)	10	3	1	0	11	3
Suzuka Unlimited FC	2018	JRL (Tōkai, Div. 1)	13	9	1	0	14	9
Suzuka Unlimited FC	2019	JFL	29	18	0	0	29	18
Suzuka Point Getters	2020	JFL	12	4	1	0	13	4
Suzuka Point Getters	2021	JFL	22	7	0	0	22	7
FC Osaka	2022	JFL	19	3	0	0	19	3
FC Osaka	2023	J3 League	1	0	0	0	1	0
Veertien Mie (loan)	2023	JFL	0	0	0	0	0	0
Career total			209	73	6	0	215	73

== Honours ==
Individual

- JFL Top Scorer : 2019
- JFL Best XI : 2019
