= Luan Santos (footballer, born 1991) =

Brazilian association football player

Personal information
- Full name: Luan Pereira dos Santos
- Date of birth: 11 September 1991 (age 35)
- Height: 1.90 m (6 ft 3 in)
- Position: Forward

Team information
- Current team: Uttaradit
- Number: 91

Youth career
- 2009: Juventude
- 2011: Grêmio
- 2011: Paraná

Senior career*
Years	Team	Apps	(Gls)
2010	Juventude	7	(0)
2010	Juventude B		
2010	Internacional B		
2010–2011	Grêmio B		
2011	Paraná		
2012–2013	Esportivo	1	(0)
2012	→ Inter de Santa Maria (loan)		
2013	Guarani-VA		
2014	Avenida		
2014	Bagé		
2014	ASEEV		
2015	Anápolis		
2016	Esportivo	1	(0)
2016	Boavista	10	(5)
2017–2018	União da Madeira	50	(15)
2018–2019	Hatta	25	(19)
2019–2020	Al Hamriyah	15	(12)
2020–2021	Brusque	2	(0)
2021–2022	Leixões	3	(0)
2022–2023	Chanthaburi	22	(19)
2023–2024	Lampang	26	(8)
2024–2025	Navy	9	(7)
2025–	Uttaradit		
- * Club domestic league appearances and goals as of 29 April 2026

Luan Pereira dos Santos (born 11 September 1991) is a Brazilian footballer who plays as a forward.

== Club career ==
He made his professional debut in the Campeonato Gaúcho for Juventude on 7 February 2010 in a game against Santa Cruz.
