= Chiangmai F.C. =

Association football club in Thailand

Chiangmai เชียงใหม่ เอฟซี
- Full name: Chiang Mai Football Club สโมสรฟุตบอลจังหวัดเชียงใหม่
- Nicknames: The Lanna Tigers (พยัคฆ์ล้านนา)
- Short name: CMFC
- Founded: 1999, as Sports Association of Chiang Mai Province Football Club (สโมสรฟุตบอลสมาคมกีฬาแห่งจังหวัดเชียงใหม่)
- Ground: Chiang Mai Municipality Stadium; Chiang Mai, Thailand
- Capacity: 5,000
- Head Coach: Anan Amornlertsak
- League: Thai League 3
- 2025–26: Thai League 3, 2nd of 12 in the Northern region
- Website: cmfctiger.com
Home colours	Away colours	Third colours

Chiang Mai Football Club (Thai: สโมสรฟุตบอลจังหวัดเชียงใหม่), also known as Chiangmai, was formerly known as Chiang Mai United, is a Thai professional football club based in Chiang Mai province, a province located in the northern part of Thailand. Their main home ground at Chiang Mai Municipality Stadium.

== History ==
Based on the website Thai-Fussball.com, Chiangmai Football Club was founded in 1999 and played in Thailand Provincial League until 2007.

In 2009 the club was restructured. They were given a new badge, new management, new nickname "Lanna Tigers" the club finished 9th in the Regional League Northern Region just to win it a year later. It qualified Chiang Mai Football Club to participate in the play-offs which they mastered successfully.

But the first-ever adventure in the Thai Division 1 League in 2011 lasted only one season. It took the side two years to bounce back. However, a second period was in limbo when club president Udonpan Jantaraviroj announced to withdraw the club and his support in the second tier. After lengthy discussions and fan protests he agreed to move on but at the end of 2016, he decides to quit the club after he managed Chiangmai Football Club for a long time.

== Stadium and locations by season ==
Coordinates	Location	Stadium	Capacity	Year
18°48′03″N 98°59′22″E	Chiang Mai	Chiangmai Municipality Stadium	2,500	2007–2008, 2020–2024
18°50′23″N 98°57′34″E	Chiang Mai	700th Anniversary Stadium	25,000	2009–2017, 2018–2019

== Season by season record ==
Season	League									FA Cup	League Cup	T3 Cup	Top scorer	
Season	Division	P	W	D	L	F	A	Pts	Pos	FA Cup	League Cup	T3 Cup	Name	Goals
1999/2000	Pro League	22	5	4	13	21	45	19	11th					
2000/2001	Pro League	22	12	1	9	29	22	37	4th				(Thailand) Bundit Petampai	11
2002	Pro League	10	4	5	1	16	9	17	3rd				(Thailand) Bundit Petampai	13
2003	Pro League	22	9	8	5	39	28	35	4th				(Thailand) Supakit Jinajai	12
2004	Pro League	18	1	5	12	10	34	8	10th				(Thailand) Supakit Jinajai	6
2005	Pro League	4	2	0	2	6	7	6	3rd					
2006	DIV 2	30	3	4	23	19	75	13	16th					
2007	DIV 2	22	9	5	8	30	38	32	7th					
2008	DIV 2	20	3	6	11	25	34	15	9th					
2009	DIV 2 North	20	4	4	12	24	44	16	9th	R1				
2010	DIV 2 North	30	26	1	3	65	14	79	1st	Opted out	Opted out			
2011	DIV 1	34	7	9	18	36	55	30	16th	R2	R3		(Thailand) Sarun Sridech	6
2012	DIV 2 North	34	24	8	2	78	30	80	1st	Opted out	Opted out		(Senegal) Aliou Seck	18+(4 Championship round)
2013	DIV 2 North	30	21	6	3	70	20	69	1st	Opted out	Opted out		(Thailand) Chatchai Narkwijit	27+(5 Championship round)
2014	DIV 1	34	15	10	9	51	36	55	5th	R3	R1		(Paraguay) Anggello Machuca	16
2015	DIV 1	38	12	12	14	43	54	48	15th	R2	R1		(Thailand) Chatchai Narkwijit	8
2016	DIV 1	26	8	8	10	36	34	32	9th	R2	R1		(Thailand) Apiwat Pengprakone	10
2017	T2	32	12	3	17	46	52	39	10th	R2	R1		(North Macedonia) Hristijan Kirovski	10
2018	T2	28	13	11	4	45	31	50	3rd	R1	QRP		(Brazil) Soares	11
2019	T1	30	7	7	16	39	62	28	16th	R1	R1		(Brazil) Eliandro	12
2020–21	T2	34	16	8	10	56	45	56	7th	R3	–		(Japan) Ryo Matsumura	16
2021–22	T2	34	10	8	16	39	55	38	14th	R1	R1		(Japan) Seiya Sugishita, (Serbia) Veljko Filipović, (Russia) Evgeni Kabaev	7
2022–23	T2	34	13	7	14	49	41	46	11th	R2	QF		(South Korea) Lim Chang-gyoon, (South Korea) Kim Bo-yong	9
2023–24	T2	34	17	8	9	55	34	59	4th	R1	QF		(South Korea) Yoo Byung-soo	11
2024–25	T3 North	20	9	8	3	39	22	35	3rd	Opted out	Opted out	LP	(Brazil) Felipe Micael	8
2025–26	T3 North	22	12	6	4	41	24	42	2nd	R1	Opted out	LP	(Brazil) Efrain Rintaro, (Thailand) Kueanun Junumpai, (Thailand) Phitsanusak Chuenbua-in	8

Champions	Runners-up	Promoted	Relegated

== Managerial history ==
- (Thailand) Somchai Chuayboonchum 2014
- (Netherlands) Wil Boessen 2015
- (Japan) Sugao Kambe 2015–2017
- (Thailand) Apisit Im-ampai 2017
- (Thailand) Choketawee Promrut 2017
- (Brazil) Carlos Eduardo Parreira 2018–2019
- (Thailand) Surapong Kongthep 2019
- (Thailand) Amnaj Kaewkiew 2020–2021
- (Thailand) Pairoj Borwonwatanadilok 2021–2022
- (Thailand) Tanongsak Prajakkata 2022
- (Japan) Jun Fukuda 2022–2023
- (Spain) Albert Garcia Xicota 2023
- (Thailand) Patipat Rorbru 2024
- (Thailand) Nattapon Krachangpho (interim) 2024
- (Thailand) Anan Amornlertsak 2024–

== Honours ==
=== Domestic leagues ===
- Thai League 2
  - Third place (1): 2018
- Regional League Division 2:
  - Runners-up (1): 2013
- Regional League Northern Division
  - Winners (3): 2010, 2012, 2013

== First team squad ==
As of September 2026

Note: Flags indicate national team as defined under FIFA eligibility rules; some limited exceptions apply. Players may hold more than one non-FIFA nationality.

No.	Pos.	Nation	Player
1	GK	THA	Pathomtat Sudprasert
4	DF	THA	Mathawin Chueanun
6	DF	THA	Sarawut Yodyinghathaikul
7	MF	THA	Phitsanusak Chuenbua-in
9	MF	THA	Wuttikrai Pathan
10	MF	THA	Panudech Maiwong
11	FW	THA	Pichai Thongvilas
12	DF	THA	Tanut Ruengklan
13	MF	GHA	Isaac Aboagye
16	MF	THA	Antonio Verzura
18	GK	THA	Surasak Thongoon

No.	Pos.	Nation	Player
20	MF	THA	Taweechai Lamue
21	MF	THA	Tanadol Chaipa
22	MF	THA	Wiset Monsikanphon
23	MF	BRA	Allisson Spier
27	DF	THA	Phongsak Vatina
28	FW	THA	Methi Chewagao
30	FW	THA	Olan Sirikunsathian
34	DF	THA	Attaphon Kannoo
49	MF	THA	Theerathip Keereeprasopthong
68	DF	THA	Phakphum Kunkongmee
77	FW	THA	Chotichai Matho
79	FW	THA	Thanadon Supaphon
99	FW	BRA	Efrain Rintaro
