= Antonio Verzura =

Thai footballer

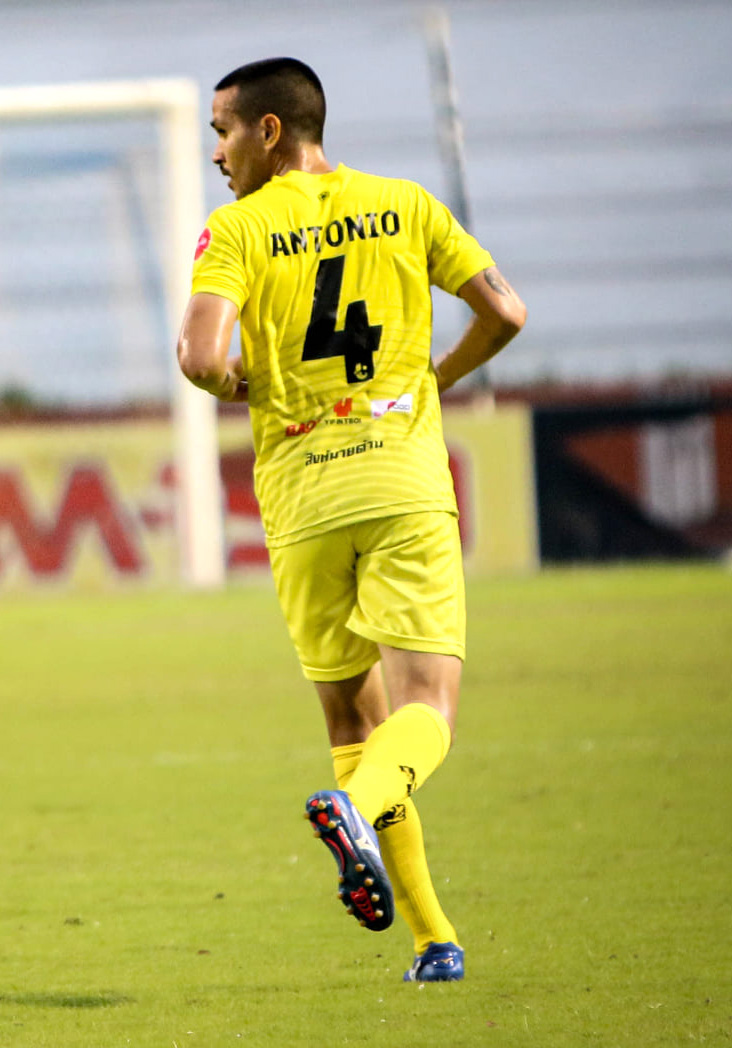
- Verzura in 2021

Personal information
- Full name: Antonio Verzura
- Date of birth: 27 May 1992 (age 34)
- Place of birth: Bangkok, Thailand
- Height: 1.70 m (5 ft 7 in)
- Positions: Defensive midfielder; right back

Team information
- Current team: Chiangmai
- Number: 16

Youth career
- 2009–2010: Osotspa

Senior career*
Years	Team	Apps	(Gls)
2011–2017	Super Power Samut Prakan	18	(0)
2018	Ubon UMT United	34	(2)
2019	PT Prachuap	1	(0)
2019	Sukhothai	1	(0)
2020	MOF Customs United	23	(0)
2021–2023	Nakhon Si United	42	(0)
2023–2024	Customs United	28	(0)
2024–	Chiangmai	18	(0)
- * Club domestic league appearances and goals as of 3 April 2025

Antonio Verzura (Thai: อันโตนิโอ แวซูร่า; born 27 May 1992) is a Thai football player. who last played as a defensive midfielder or a right back for Thai League 3 club Chiangmai.

== Personal life ==
Antonio was born in Bangkok. His father is Italian and his mother is Thai. Antonio's twin younger brother Gionata is also a footballer.
