= Senator Hall =

Senator Hall may refer to:

- Alfred A. Hall (1848–1912), Vermont State Senate
- Benton Jay Hall (1835–1894), Iowa State Senate
- Bob Hall (politician) (born 1942), Texas State Senate
- Chris Hall (university president) (born 1956), Maine State Senate
- Chuck Hall (Oklahoma politician), Oklahoma State Senate
- Dan Hall (politician) (born 1952), Minnesota State Senate
- Daniel Hall (West Virginia politician) (born 1974), West Virginia State Senate
- Darwin Hall (1844–1919), Minnesota State Senate
- Elmer Hall (1866–1952), Wisconsin State Senate
- Harber H. Hall (born 1920), Illinois State Senate
- Isadore Hall III (born 1971), California State Senate
- James Knox Polk Hall (1844–1915), Pennsylvania State Senate
- James Randal Hall (born 1958), Georgia State Senate
- John C. Hall (1821–1896), Wisconsin State Senate
- John W. Hall (1817–1892), Delaware State Senate
- Joshua G. Hall (1828–1898), New Hampshire State Senate
- Katie Hall (American politician) (1938–2012), Indiana State Senate
- Kenneth Hall (Illinois politician) (1915–1995), Illinois State Senate
- Luther E. Hall (1869–1921), Louisiana State Senate
- Mike Hall (West Virginia politician) (born 1948), West Virginia State Senate
- Oliver Hall (politician) (1852–1946), Washington State Senate
- Osee M. Hall (1847–1914), Minnesota State Senate
- Philo Hall (1865–1938), South Dakota State Senate
- Ralph Hall (1923–2019), Texas State Senate
- Robert A. Hall (born 1946), Massachusetts State Senate
- Robert Bernard Hall (1812–1868), Massachusetts State Senate
- Robert S. Hall (1879–1941), Mississippi State Senate
- Rodney Hall (South Dakota politician) (born 1928), South Dakota State Senate
- Samuel H. P. Hall (1804–1877), New York State Senate
- Stephen Hall (politician) (1941–2014), Maine State Senate
- Tim Hall (Nebraska politician) (born 1956), Nebraska State Senate
- Thomas H. Hall (1773–1853), North Carolina State Senate
- Tony P. Hall (born 1942), Ohio State Senate
- Willard Hall (1780–1875), Delaware State Senate
- William Pike Hall Sr. (1896–1945), Louisiana State Senate
- William Hall (governor) (1775–1856), Tennessee State Senate
- Wilton E. Hall (1901–1980), U.S. Senator from South Carolina
