= United Arab Emirates–United States relations =

- United Arab Emirates: United States

Diplomatic mission
- United Arab Emirates Embassy, Washington D.C.: United States Embassy, Abu Dhabi

Envoy
- Ambassador Yousef Al Otaiba: Chargé d'affaires Shannon Dolan

The United Arab Emirates has close and friendly relationship with the United States, being described as the United States' best counter-terrorism ally in the Gulf by Richard A. Clarke, the U.S. national security advisor and counter-terrorism expert. In terms of defense, the United Arab Emirates Armed Forces has been nicknamed "Little Sparta" by United States Armed Forces generals and former U.S. Secretary of Defense Jim Mattis for its active role against extremists in the Middle East. The United Arab Emirates also hosts the only United States border preclearance in the Middle East. Both countries are members of the I2U2 Group, which was established in 2021.

== Diplomatic relations ==
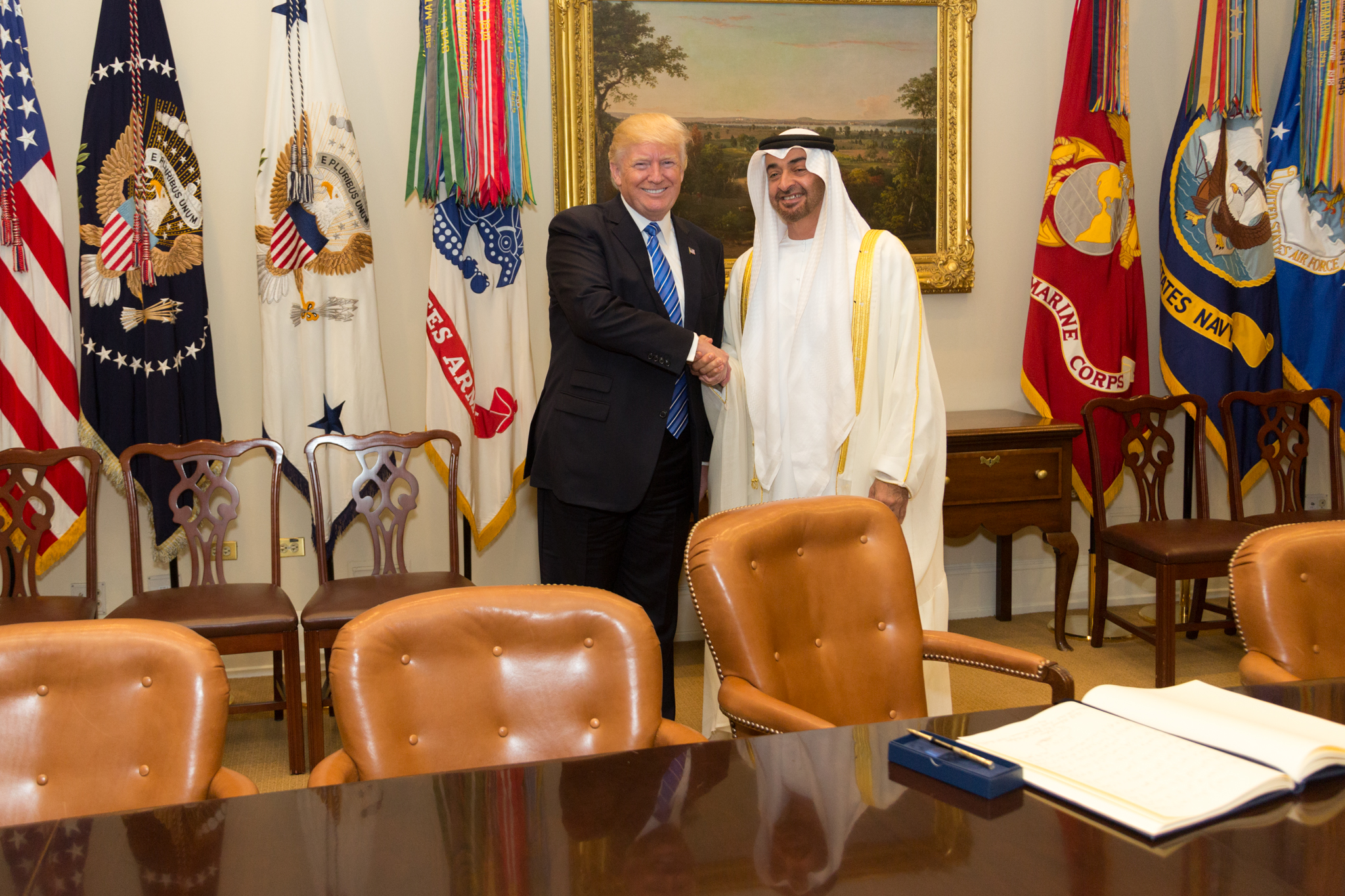
Sheikh Mohammed bin Zayed Al Nahyan and U.S. president Donald Trump in Washington DC, May 2017

The United States is the third country to establish formal diplomatic relations with the UAE and has had an ambassador resident in the UAE since 1974. The two countries have enjoyed friendly relations with each other and have developed strong government-to-government ties including close security cooperation. The quality of U.S.-UAE relations increased dramatically as a result of the U.S.-led coalition's campaign to end the Iraqi occupation of Kuwait. UAE ports host more U.S. Navy ships than any port outside the U.S.

In the 2016 United States presidential election, the U.S. Justice Department accused George Nader of providing $3.5 million in illicit campaign donations to Hillary Clinton before the elections and to Donald Trump after he won the elections. According to The New York Times, this was an attempt by the government of United Arab Emirates to influence the election.

Leading the UAE Embassy in Washington, D.C. is Ambassador Yousef Al Otaiba, who presented his credentials in July 2008.

In December 2018, the UAE reopened its embassy in Damascus to restore ties with the government of Syrian president Bashar al-Assad – a step that the UAE took against the wishes of the US. In January 2019, the UAE hosted a Syrian trade delegation that was led by a businessman, who was on the U.S. Treasury sanctions list since 2011.

On 20 September 2021, the Financial Times reported that the UAE was being squeezed between the competing interests of the United States and China. As the Emirati relations with China were intensifying, the Emirati alliance with the US began to face turbulence. The US raised concerns about the potential security implications of the UAE using Chinese Technology, such as Huawei’s 5G telecommunications network. Besides, China has been the biggest buyer of crude oil from the Gulf region. Moreover, it has been broadening its economic and political footprint across the Middle East, which has added some layers of tension to the UAE-US relations.

In November 2021, the US raised a warning for the UAE, alarming the Emirati government of a Chinese military presence in its country that could hinder ties. US intelligence agencies found that China was secretly building a military facility at a port in Abu Dhabi. Emirati authorities initially denied reports of the facility despite reports of a basketball court with a floor containing printed images of the flag of the Chinese Communist Party and flag of the People's Liberation Army. Following several American meetings and visits by US officials, the site construction was halted. Despite that, the US officials said that extensive Chinese presence in the UAE could also endanger the planned $23 billion deal of F-35 fighter jets, Reaper drones and other advanced munitions.

On 3 November 2021, Foreign Policy reported that the policies advanced by the UAE in the Middle East have been destabilising the region, violating international law and overthrowing attempts for democratic change. The Emirates has also repeatedly attempted to illegally interfere in US domestic politics at the highest levels. This point of view argued that such actions of the UAE have served to harm American interests in the Middle East and at home.

Two UAE-based firms have been named in a criminal complaint for the violation of the International Emergency Economic Powers Act (IEEPA) committed by a dual US-Iran citizen, Kambiz Attar Kashani. Kashani's criminal complaint was filed in the federal court of Brooklyn for conspiring to illegally export US goods, services, and technology to the people of Iran and the government of Iran in association with two UAE-based front companies. The defendant allegedly used the two Dubai-based front organizations in order to procure items from more than one US technology firm. Kashani reportedly carried out the illegal transshipping scheme through the UAE front companies from February 2019 through to June 2021. The prime defendant, Kashani, and his co-conspirators intentionally concealed from the source US companies that the products and services will be sent to Iran, by fraudulently portraying that the end-users would be the said UAE front companies.

The United States sanctioned a UAE-based firm along with multiple Asian firms for aiding the illegal trading of millions of dollars' worth of Iranian oil to East Asia. The UAE firm involved namely, Blue Cactus Heavy Equipment and Machinery Spare Parts Trading was sanctioned by the Treasury Department's Office of Foreign Assets Control (OFAC) on 1 August 2022 for its assistance in petroleum trade on the behalf of an Iranian company, coincidentally a week before OPEC+ meetings. The Treasury Department did not comment on whether the penalties were potential enough to impact US need to acquire increased oil production from the UAE. US president Joe Biden’s administration used an August 2018 executive order as the authority for imposing the sanctions. The executive order was signed into existence by Donald Trump.

In 2018, a UAE princess, a US-French dual national and others were arrested by Indian and UAE soldiers in the Arabian sea, a few kilometres off the coast of India. The princess, Latifa bint Mohammed Al Maktoum, was then sent back to the UAE. She wanted to escape the oppressive UAE government. After the incident, there was a lot of criticism.

While the UAE President Mohamed bin Zayed considered the US a significant ally, he avoided visiting Washington since 2017. But, he had been elaborating ties with American rivals, including Russia and China. Between 2022 and 2023, MbZ visited Russia twice to meet President Vladimir Putin. Besides, in June 2023, the UAE was celebrated as the guest of honor at Putin's flagship investment forum, St. Petersburg International Economic Forum (SPIEF). On the other hand, the UAE was also building ties with China, as the air forces of both the countries were planning to conduct a training together for the first time in August 2023. American officials had not been successful in influencing the UAE to move along with the American foreign policies, particularly in isolating Russia due to the Ukraine invasion and in limiting the Chinese military ties. Instead, the Emirates expanded its economy through imports of Russian money, oil, gold. Besides, a number of wealthy Russian oligarch started moving to real estates in Dubai. The UAE started to establish a stronger foreign policy following the Arab Spring uprisings, when it assisted other regional powers by sending military and arms. In 2014, the UAE initiated airstrikes in Libya, without giving any information to the US. However, major issues between the US and UAE emerged after a deal to purchase F-35 Fighter Jet was stalled in 2021. Following that, the UAE started relying on other nations to buy weaponry, including the L-15 trainer aircraft from China.

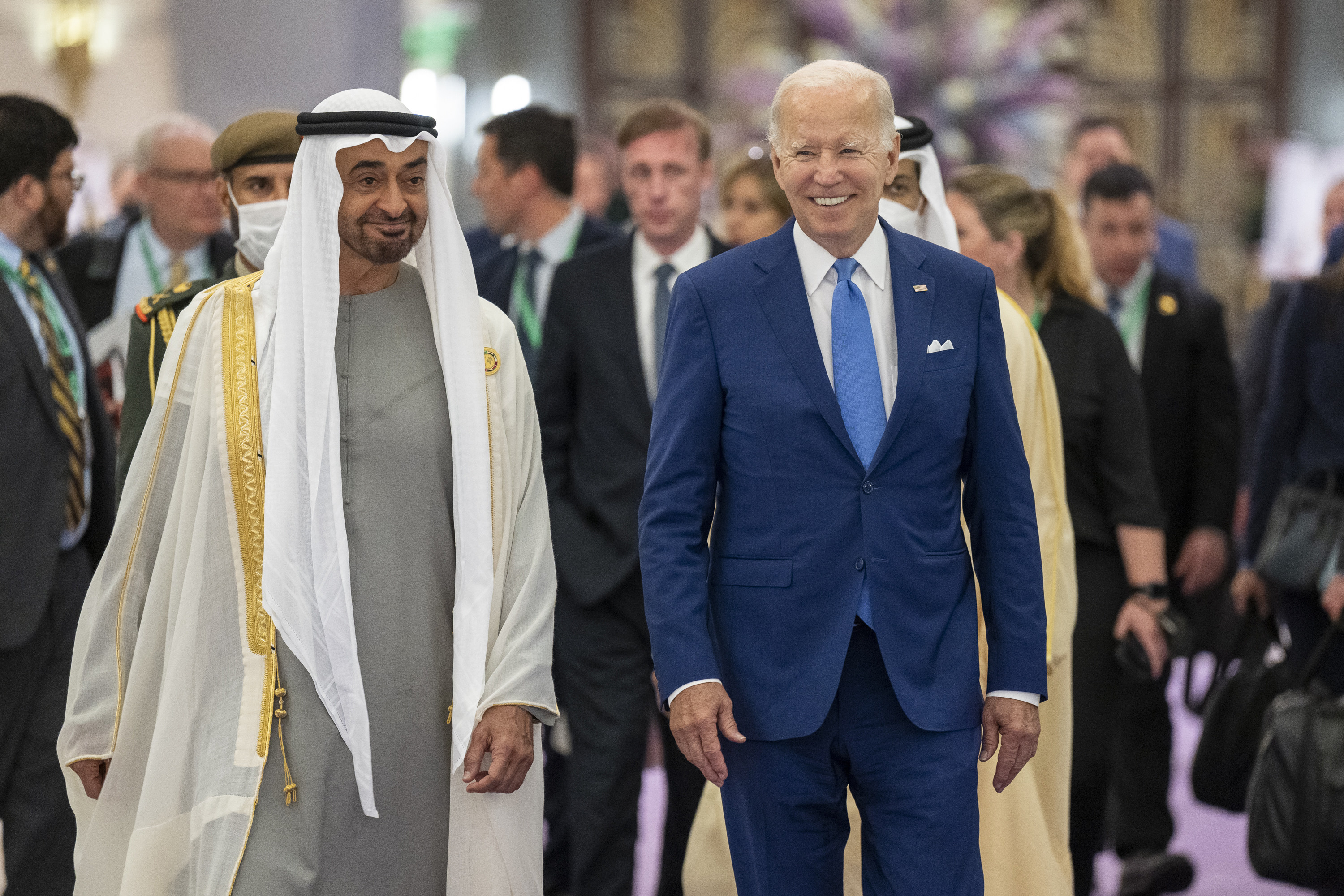
President Joe Biden and UAE's President Mohamed bin Zayed Al Nahyan, July 2022

The inefficiency of the US sanctions against Russia was questioned by the former chairman of DMCC, Hamad Buamim, who said the sanctions did not showcase any impact outside the West. He said the attempt to stop business and trade has instead redirected it in a different way. Buamim said the sanctions were making trade more complicated and impacting the entire world. Meanwhile, Dubai was seen benefitting from the American and European efforts to isolate the Russia economy, as Switzerland's sanctions on Moscow pushed oil traders to shift from Geneva to the UAE.

In June 2024, the OFAC sanctioned three UAE companies involved in trade of Iranian petroleum or petrochemical products. The companies were Sea Route Ship management FZE, Almanac Ship Management LLC and Al Anchor Ship Management. The US also blocked 11 vessels, including ASTRA, BERENICE PRIDE, PARINE and others, which were associated with these companies.

On 20 September 2024, five lawmakers, including Pramila Jayapal, Barbara Lee, Ilhan Omar, Daniel Kildee, and Sara Jacobs, sent a letter to White House and called upon the Biden administration to raise concerns with the UAE over its involvement in the Sudan conflict. The lawmakers praised President Joe Biden's efforts towards putting an end to the war, but stated that the Emirati actions could affect those efforts. The letter came ahead of the UAE President Mohammed bin Zayed's 23 September 2024 visit to the US. Marking the first ever meeting of an Emirati President to the White House, MbZ met Biden and Vice President Kamala Harris separately, discussing the future bilateral decisions. Joe Biden entitled the UAE as the US’ “Major Defence Partner”, following his meeting with the UAE President Mohamed bin Zayed in the White House. The decision was, however, opposed due to the UAE's involvement in wars in the Middle East and Africa, including the Yemen and Libya civil war. Biden's designation of the Emirates was also questioned over the UAE's increasing economic foothold in Africa, and its “secret” support to the Rapid Support Forces (RSF) militia in the Sudan war.

The UAE gave millions of dollars in donation to a US-based nonprofit organization, United Way of Collier and the Keys (UWCK). The donations were publicized as aid for post-hurricane recovery and coral reef restoration in Florida, under the Emirates’ environmental commitment. As per the US intelligence, these funds were a part of the Emirati efforts to influence the American Policymakers, launder the UAE's human rights records and suppress criticism of its intervention in regional wars. The UWCK served as the UAE's soft-power tool for covert operations by agents of the UAE security services. The organization didn't disclose full scale of the Emirati donations, while the UAE exploited “environment cause” as a new medium to influence and whitewash its image.

While the UAE was seeking to acquire the world's most advanced AI chips from the US, members of the National Security Council and other Trump administration officials were adopting foreign export policies that would restrict foreign access to these chips. However, in early April 2025, six security council officials, including David Feith, were fired by Trump, appointing David Sacks to undertake the negotiations. The Emiratis also started demanding for TSMC to build a chip factory in the UAE. Top officials were trying to block or modify the UAE's proposal, but Sacks and Steve Witkoff pushed for the AI deal to be completed. By mid-May 2025, the White House agreed to allow the UAE access to the advanced AI chips. The deal was finalized two weeks after Tahnoun bin Zayed claimed to invest $2 billion into World Liberty Financial, a crypto firm founded by Witkoffs and Trumps.

In September 2025, the US Treasury sanctioned several UAE-based individuals and entities for supporting Islamic Revolutionary Guard Corps (IRGC)'s Quds Force and the Iranian Ministry of Defense and Armed Forces Logistics (MODAFL) by coordinating illicit money transfers, including from the sale of Iranian oil. Calling them the Iranian “shadow banking” network, the OFAC said they assist in evading sanctions by laundering money through overseas front companies and cryptocurrency. The sanctions targeted Vahid Derakhshan, who is involved in the day-to-day operations and financial activities of UAE-based firms like Alpa Trading – FZCO and Alpa Investment L.L.C. Multiple other UAE-based front companies were also sanctioned for facilitating illegal money flows, including purchases on behalf of MODAFL and the IRGC.

== Economic relations ==
US prosecutors in 2016 alleged that Dubai-based Gunes General Trading carried out suspicious transactions totalling $142 million, using the UAE financial system during 2011 and 2012, the BBC found and reported on 20 September 2020. U.S. prosecutors accused the Dubai-based trading firm of being part of a network that was under the control of a Turkish-Iranian gold trader, Reza Zarrab. The network allegedly coordinated the transaction worth millions of dollars for the Iranian government and other US-sanctioned entities belonging to Iran.

On 19 August 2020, the Trump administration sanctioned two companies registered in the United Arab Emirates over their work for an Iranian airline, Mahan Air. The airline has been subject to U.S. counter-terrorism sanctions since 2019 for its support to the IRGC, which the State Department has designated as a foreign terrorist organization. The sanctions targeted UAE-based Parthia Cargo and Delta Parts Supply, along with Parthia's owner, Amin Mahdavi.

In June 2024, seven UAE-based companies faced “blocked pending investigation action” (BPI) by OFAC for violating US sanctions on Sudan. As part of this action, all property and interests in property of these Emirati firms within the US or under control of American citizens were blocked pending further investigation. The BPI restricted Americans from transacting with these companies. The formal addition of these companies to the Specially Designated Nationals and Blocked Persons List (SDN List) was to be determined after further investigation.

In 2024, it was reported that the UAE seeks closer economic ties with the U.S. as part of its strategy to invest in emerging artificial intelligence (AI) technologies. The UAE reportedly seeks greater access to U.S. technologies that Emirati firms currently have difficulties accessing; as it stands, the UAE's close relationship with China, currently subject to U.S. tech export restrictions, limit UAE-based companies' access to certain technologies.

In May 2025, President Donald Trump announced $200 billion in deals with the UAE, including cooperation in artificial intelligence, following his visit to Abu Dhabi. The US agreed to build the 5GW AI campus in the UAE, the largest outside the US. Under the agreements, the UAE was also likely to get expanded access to the advanced AI chips from Washington. However, some of the Trump administration officials were delaying the efforts to finalize the deal with the UAE, which would be able to purchase Nvidia's AI chips. The officials raised concerns that China would get access to the advance US technology through the UAE and G42. They were looking to block G42 from getting direct access to around 20% of the semiconductors, a term mentioned in the initial agreement. Other officials feared that Huawei could take advantage of the delays and outpace the US in providing technology to the UAE.

== Bilateral Nuclear Cooperation Agreement ==
On 15 January 2009, Sheikh Abdullah bin Zayed Al Nahyan, Foreign Minister of the United Arab Emirates, and U.S. Secretary of State Condoleezza Rice signed a bilateral agreement for peaceful nuclear cooperation that enhances international standards of nuclear non-proliferation.

President Barack Obama subsequently endorsed the agreement and submitted it to Congress on 20 May 2009, for the mandatory 90-day review. After a hearing on Capitol Hill in July 2009, leaders of the House Foreign Affairs and Senate Foreign Relations Committees issued resolutions supporting the US-UAE nuclear cooperation agreement."

== Military ==
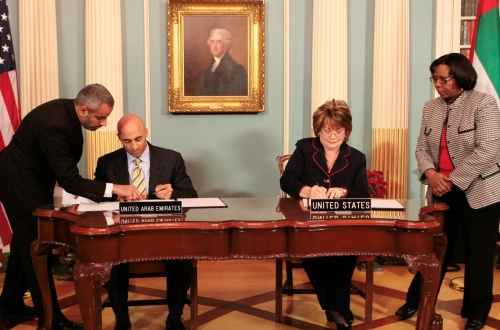
U.S. Under Secretary for Arms Control and International Security Ellen Tauscher and United Arab Emirates Ambassador Yousef Al Otaiba exchange diplomatic notes to bring the Agreement for Peaceful Civilian Nuclear Energy Cooperation into force. (17 December 2009)

The United States maintains three military bases in the United Arab Emirates. The three bases are Al Dhafra Air Base, Al Minhad Air Base, and the Fujairah Naval Base. A major military hospital modelled on the central American medical facility in Germany, Landstuhl Regional Medical Center, is also being built in the UAE which will be operated by the United States Army, United States Department of Defense, and the United Arab Emirates Armed Forces.

According to Richard A. Clarke, then U.S. National Coordinator for Security, Infrastructure Protection and Counter-terrorism and a contributor in the 9/11 Commission Report, the UAE is the United States' best counter-terrorism ally in the Gulf.

The United Arab Emirates Armed Forces are the only Arab country to commit military troops for humanitarian aid missions in the US-led War in Afghanistan. The UAE military is nicknamed "Little Sparta" by United States Armed Forces Generals and specifically by former U.S. defense secretary James Mattis due to its active and effective military role, particularly in the war on terrorism, despite its small active personnel. Mattis has also called the UAE led 2016 Battle of Mukalla operation a model for American troops, referencing how the United Arab Emirates Armed Forces liberated the port of Mukalla from Al-Qaeda in the Arabian Peninsula forces in 36 hours after being held by AQAP for more than a year. Prior to joining the Trump administration, Mattis received permission from the U.S. military after retiring from the Marine Corps to work as a military adviser to the United Arab Emirates Armed Forces.

The United Arab Armed Forces also receive defense advice from two former top U.S. military commanders, former secretary of defense James Mattis and General John R. Allen, a retired United States Marine Corps four-star general and former commander of the NATO International Security Assistance Force.

On 4 February 2019, a CNN investigation found out that the U.S. weapons, which were sold to UAE and Saudi Arabia, ended up in the hands of al-Qaeda fighters, hardline Salafi militias and other militants waging war in Yemen. The investigation also unveiled that UAE and Saudi Arabia used US-made weapons in form of currency to buy the loyalties of militias.

Through a partnership with the United States, the United Arab Emirates has spearheaded an active role in fighting against AQAP and ISIS-YP in Yemen. On 26 February 2019, U.S. president Donald Trump publicly thanked the United Arab Emirates on his Twitter for the UAE's effort in rescuing Danny Burch, a U.S. citizen who was held in captivity for 18 months by militants in Yemen. In late 2020, it was reported that the Trump administration would sell the UAE an estimated $10 billion of F-35 jets and $2.9 billion of armed MQ-9B drones.

Based on a November 2020 report by Amnesty International, United States’ decision to sell 18 armed MQ-9B aerial drones worth approximately $2.9 billion to the United Arab Emirates could result in increasing civilian deaths in Yemen and Libya. Since March 2015, UAE, as part of the Saudi-led coalition has carried out several air strikes in Yemen. Amnesty International has visited and investigated dozens of sites in eight governorates, targeted in UAE air strikes as part of the Saudi-led coalition, and repeatedly found remnants of munitions manufactured by the United States. On 10 November 2020, Donald Trump's administration formally notified the Congress regarding the pending sale of 50 stealth F-35 fighter jets to the United Arab Emirates, as a part of the US’ broad arms deal worth $23 billion. The deal included 50 F-35s, 18 advanced armed drone systems and a package of air-to-air and air-to-ground munitions. The F-35 sale to the UAE raised concerns, as its military capability was already one of the most advanced in the Middle East, which was evident in the Emirates’ involvement in active conflict zones like Yemen, Syria and Libya.

Major US military bases and installations in the Middle East

The Senate Appropriations Committee demanded the State Department to ensure that the F-35 deal with the United Arab Emirates must not threaten Israel's military edge or make U.S. military systems vulnerable to military threats posed by Russia and China. In a report published by the Amnesty International on 9 November 2020, possible threats linked to Washington selling advanced weaponry and aircraft to the UAE were cited, in light of the Gulf nation's breach of arms embargo in Libya and international humanitarian law in Yemen.

On 30 November 2020, a group of 29 non-governmental organizations undersigned a letter written to the Congress and State Department to halt a proposed $23 billion arms sale to the United Arab Emirates, which included advanced F-35 fighter jets, armed drones and bombs. According to the letter the key reason to demand blocking this deal was the civilian casualties caused by the UAE's intervention in Libya and Yemen. The new administration of Joe Biden had announced in April 2021 that it would go ahead with the arms deal. However, within a month, concerns were raised by the US officials, citing the growing ties between China and the UAE.

In January 2021, the UAE signed a weapons deal worth $23 billion, including F-35 fighter jets and MQ-9B UAVs, with the US. In May 2021, two Chinese planes were spotted by the US spy agencies unloading unidentified material in the Emirates. In the wake of such concerns, the US officials presented three requests to the UAE: that the Emirates must ensure that no other country, particularly China, gets access to the US’ F-35 and drone technology; that the qualitative military edge of Israel is maintained; and that the weapons must not be used in Yemen and Libya, the war-torn countries where the UAE was involved in offensives. In June 2021, the Biden administration raised another concern with the UAE. The US asked the Emirates to remove the Chinese Huawei Technologies Co. from its telecommunications network within four years before the UAE was scheduled to receive the F-35 jets in 2026 to 2027. The Emirates asked for a longer time to look for an affordable alternative, while the US called for the UAE to distance itself from China. However, by December, the UAE suspended discussions over the arms deal with Washington. In December 2021, the United Arab Emirates unilaterally suspended talks with the US regarding the procurement, stating that technical requirements, sovereign operational restrictions, and cost/benefit analysis led to the re-assessment and suspension of the deal. Two months later, the UAE turned away from the US and indulged in talks with China for military hardware, including L-15 aircraft. In 2017, UAE had also obtained Wing Loong II drones from China, but the numbers were not disclosed.

In 2022, U.S. intelligence agencies reportedly received information in 2022 that UAE-based AI firm G42 provided technology to China's Huawei, which was allegedly used to enhance the PL-15 and PL-17 air-to-air missiles. G42 denied the claims as false. The reports prompted U.S. officials, including Commerce Secretary Gina Raimondo, to visit Abu Dhabi and warn UAE national security adviser Sheikh Tahnoon bin Zayed al-Nahyan that his country must choose between the United States and China for its AI industry.

In February 2023, the US administration put pressure on the UAE's and Egypt's government to pursue the military leaders of Libya and Sudan to expel the Wagner Group from their regions. In January 2023, the US government had expanded sanctions on Russia's Wagner Group, along with related companies and individuals, including some in the Central African Republic and the United Arab Emirates. The US's decision came after the group's expanding role in Russia's war in Ukraine.

In 2023, the UAE stopped participating in the US-led Combined Maritime Forces international naval partnership operating in the seas near UAE, which the US stated was due to concerns about the response to recent tanker seizures.

In September 2024, Joe Biden designated the UAE as a major defense partner of the US. They called for urgent humanitarian aid to Gaza and supported a ceasefire between Israel and Hamas. Both leaders highlighted cooperation in space, clean energy, and AI, while stressing no military solution to Sudan's conflict.

In March 2025, a top Democrat lawmaker, Rep. Gregory Meeks blocked the US arms to the UAE, over its alleged involvement in the Sudan civil war. He also introduced a bill, US Engagement in Sudanese Peace Act, aiming to stop military aid to countries fueling the conflict, enforce stricter sanctions against warring sides, and allocate funds for a special envoy for Sudan. Other lawmakers, including Sen. Chris Van Hollen and Rep. Sara Jacobs, also introduced a separate bill to block US arms sales to the UAE due to its support to the RSF militia in Sudan.

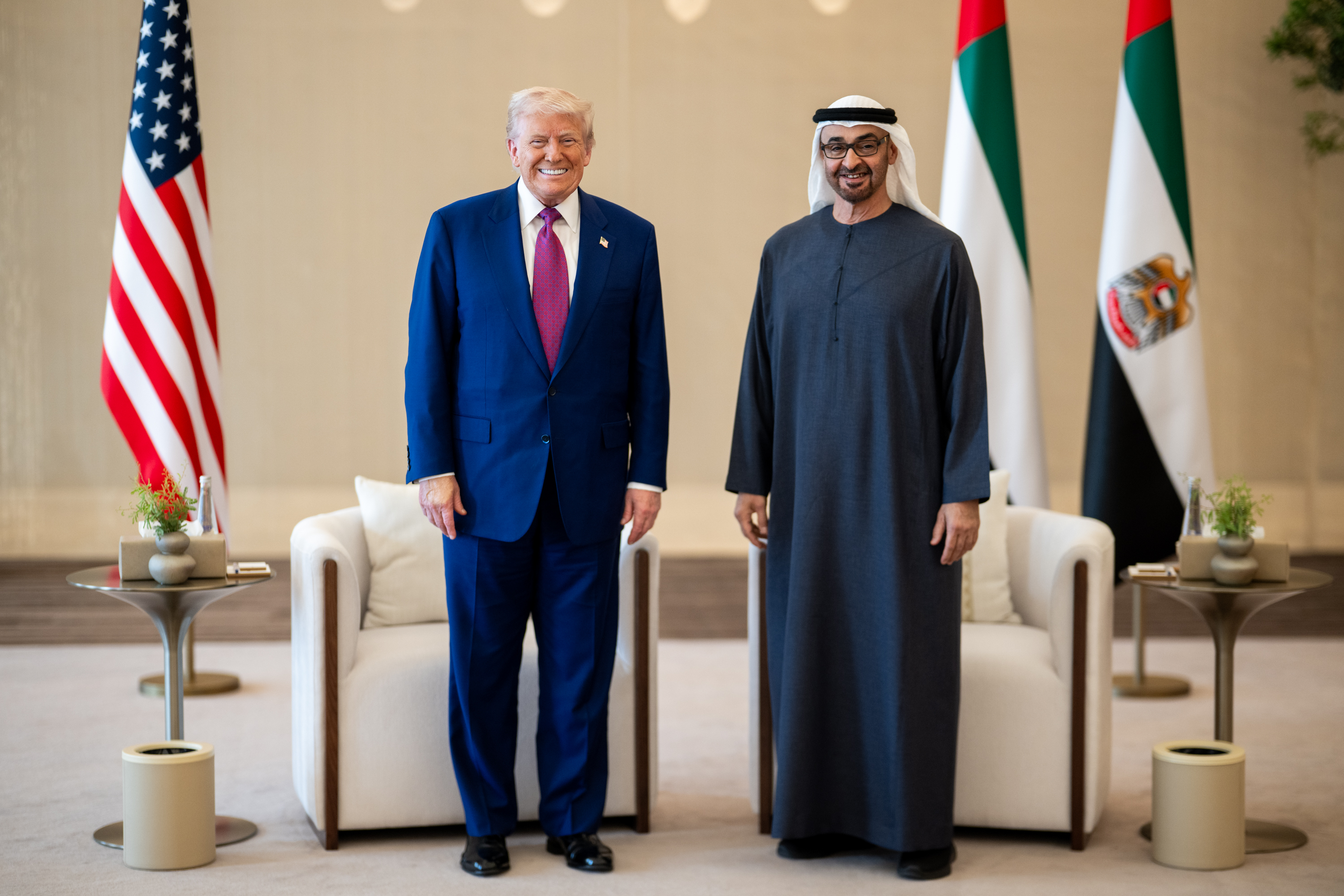
Trump and UAE President Mohamed bin Zayed Al Nahyan in Abu Dhabi during Donald Trump's visit to the Middle East, 15 May 2025

Ahead of President Trump's visit to the United Arab Emirates in May 2025, the United States is seeking to sell $1.32 billion worth of CH-47F Chinook helicopters and $130 million in parts and support for F-16 fighter jets to the United Arab Emirates, as reported by the State Department.

In June 2025, the U.S. Democratic Senators introduced multiple resolutions under Joint Resolutions of Disapproval (JRD) to block arms sales to the UAE, calling it a country taking part in “Trump’s corruption” due to its $2 billion investment in Trump's family crypto project. The joint resolutions also aimed at undermining the UAE's involvement in Sudan war, where it supplies weapons to the RSF militia. More than 30 human rights organizations, including Amnesty International, sent a joint letter in support of the JRD and urged the Senators to vote in favor of the resolutions.

In November 2025, Secretary of State Marco Rubio called for international action to stop the flow of weapons to the RSF, the paramilitary group responsible for mass killings and atrocities in El Fasher and across Sudan's Darfur region. He emphasized that the U.S. knows which countries are involved in supplying the RSF and using their territories for transit, and that pressure is being applied at the highest levels to stop this aid. The UAE is widely accused by various sources, including the Sudanese army and U.N. investigators, of being the RSF's main foreign backer.

Following coordinated U.S. and Israeli strikes on Iran on 28 February 2026, the UAE faced a series of retaliatory drone and missile attacks. Iran's IRGC targeted both U.S. military assets and critical Emirati economic infrastructure.

== United States border pre-clearance ==
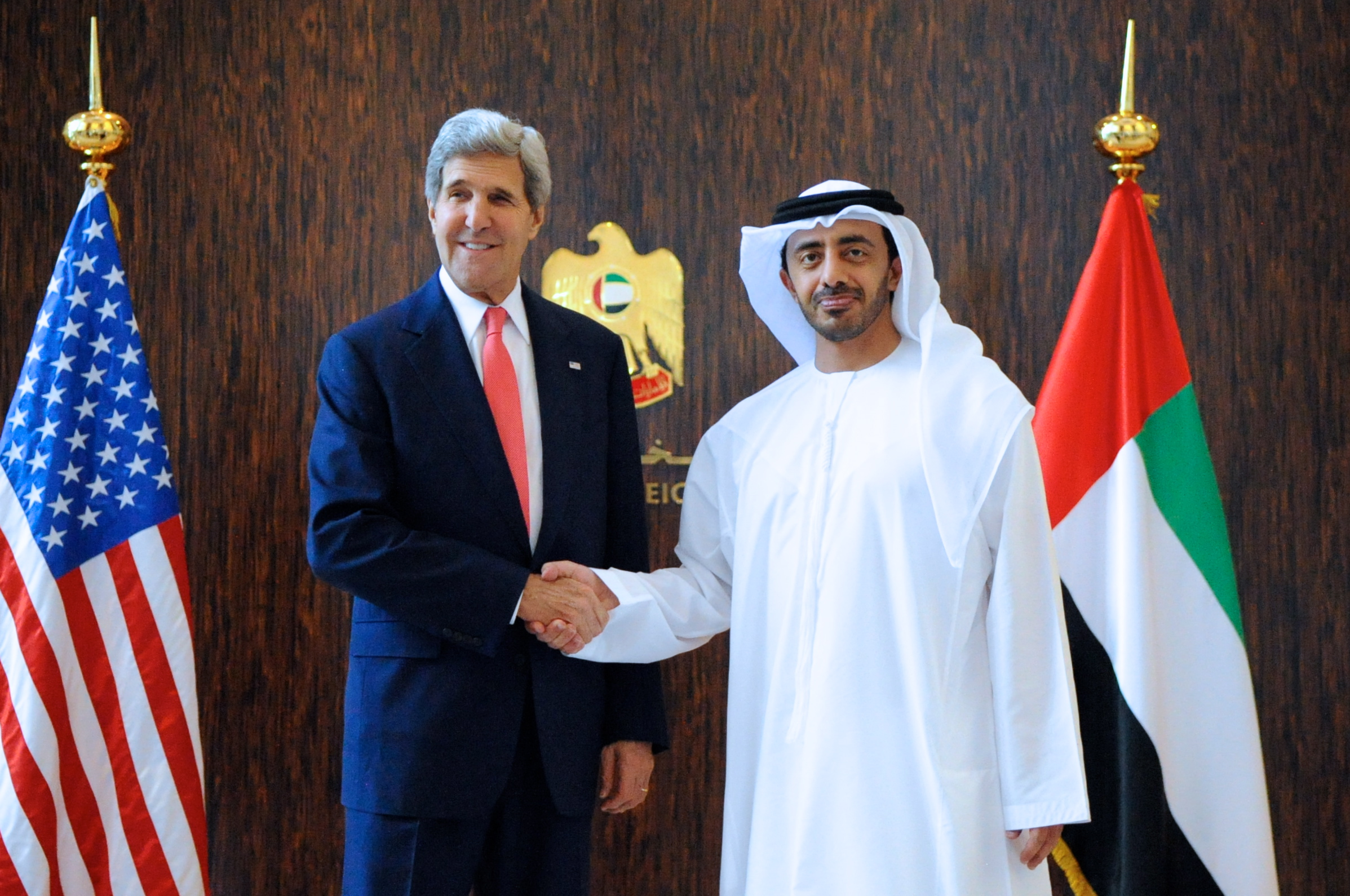
Minister of Foreign Affairs Abdullah bin Zayed Al Nahyan with U.S. Secretary of State John Kerry, 2013

The United Arab Emirates is one of the few countries and the only one in the Middle East which has a U.S. border pre-clearance that are staffed and operated by U.S. Customs and Border Protection (CBP) officers, allowing travelers from Abu Dhabi International Airport to reach the United States as domestic U.S. travelers. The U.S. customs pre-clearance facility at Abu Dhabi International Airport officially opened on 26 January 2014. U.S. customs pre-clearance is currently being planned at Dubai International Airport.

== Intelligence ==
According to Reuters, U.S. intelligence operatives from the National Security Agency (NSA) helped the United Arab Emirates National Electronic Security Authority (NESA) engage in surveillance of terrorists, other governments, militants, human rights activists, and dissidents in a collaborative project called Project Raven. The project helped break up an ISIS network within the Emirates as well as assess if other attacks were imminent after the ISIS inspired Murder of Ibolya Ryan in Abu Dhabi. According to Lori Stroud, one of the former NSA intelligence analysts, Americans were also targeted for surveillance. The New York Times reported that as a result, Mozilla rejected Abu Dhabi-based cybersecurity firm DarkMatter – linked to Project Raven – from administering online website security certificates.

In 2019, Reuters reported that United States Central Intelligence Agency does not gather human intelligence about the UAE as it does on almost every other nation where the United States has significant interests.

In November 2022, the U.S. intelligence compiled a classified report detailing extensive efforts by the UAE to steer U.S. foreign policy in its favor and manipulate the American political system, through a series of legal and illegal exploits. As per the records, the UAE has spent hundreds of millions of dollars on donations to American universities and think tanks, including many that produce policy papers with findings favorable to UAE's interests.

In April 2023, a series of confidential US intelligence documents related to the Russian invasion of Ukraine were leaked online. One of the documents revealed that the UAE had been working closely with the Russian intelligence to counter the US and the UK intelligence agencies. The document stated that the two sides had “agreed to work together” against the American and British intelligence agencies, in mid-January. The authenticity of the documents was not confirmed by the American officials, who said that some documents might have contained some false information, or were part of a misinformation campaign. The US Justice Department was investigating the Pentagon documents.

In May 2024, Gina Raimondo hailed Microsoft deal of $1.5 billion in G42, as a way to drift away the Emirati AI company from China. But, there were concerns amongst the lawmakers over the risk of sensitive AI technology getting exposed to Chinese espionage due to the deal. Through Microsoft's and the Commerce Department's briefings, lawmakers found that the advanced semiconductors that the US government was protecting from China might become accessible to G42. A Republican staffer on the House Foreign Affairs Committee stated that the deal could transfer crucial technology to “a country that is not our best friend, has close ties to China [and] has a mixed human rights record.”

The US National Intelligence Council (NIC) was entrusted to investigate and corroborate Beijing's growing involvement with the Emirati AI group, G42. The task to compile an intelligence community assessment of associations between China and G42 was assigned to a new National Intelligence Officer for China and his deputy. The NIC has to inspect the relations of G42 and all its entities with the Chinese Communist Party (CCP) and People's Liberation Army. John Moolenaar and Michael McCaul wrote a letter to the White House, asking the analytics branch of Office of the Director of National Intelligence (ODNI) to evaluate on risks involved in transfer of US technology to China via the partnership. The growing contact and Beijing's influence in Abu Dhabi alarmed the US intelligence and other politicians.

In July 2024, Yousef Al Otaiba "personally intervened" to cancel the meetings between G42 and the US Congressional staffers, over concerns raised by the US lawmakers that the UAE could transfer advanced American AI technology to China. The House Select Committee on China concerns around the G42-Microsoft deal also amplified following the UAE's refusal to meet and discuss these matters with congressional staff. That was expected to lead to more involvement of Congress in overseeing these negotiations. The canceled meetings signaled diplomatic fallout that followed the Congress’ scrutiny of the G42-Microsoft deal and fear of American AI technology reaching China.

== Sister-Twinning cities ==
- (United Arab Emirates) Abu Dhabi and (United States) Las Vegas, Nevada (2002)
- (United Arab Emirates) Dubai and (United States) New York City, New York (2003)

== Resident diplomatic missions ==
- United Arab Emirates has an embassy in Washington, D.C. and an consulates-general in Boston, Houston, Los Angeles and New York City.
- United States has an embassy in Abu Dhabi and an consulate-general in Dubai.
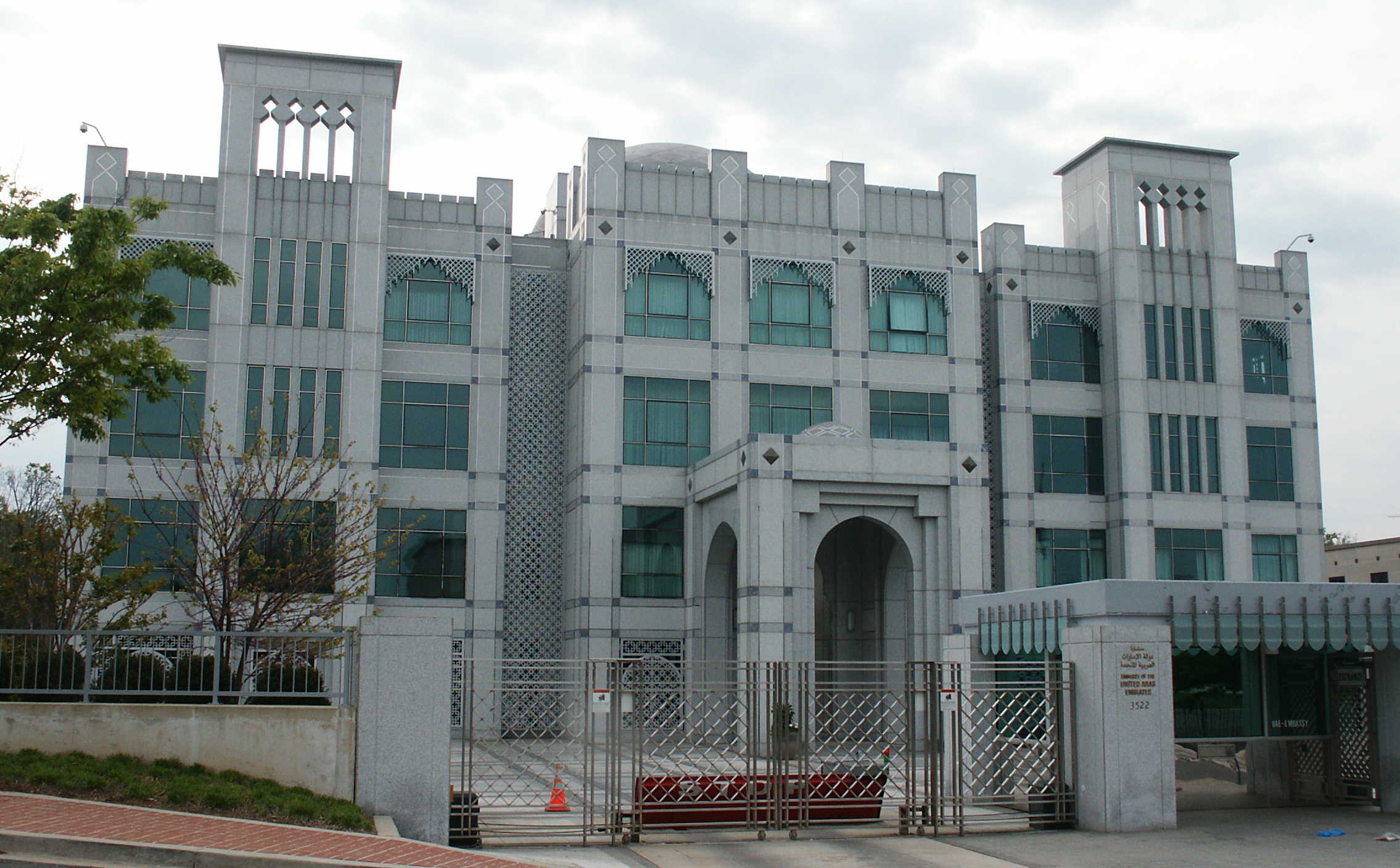
Embassy of the United Arab Emirates, Washington, D.C.

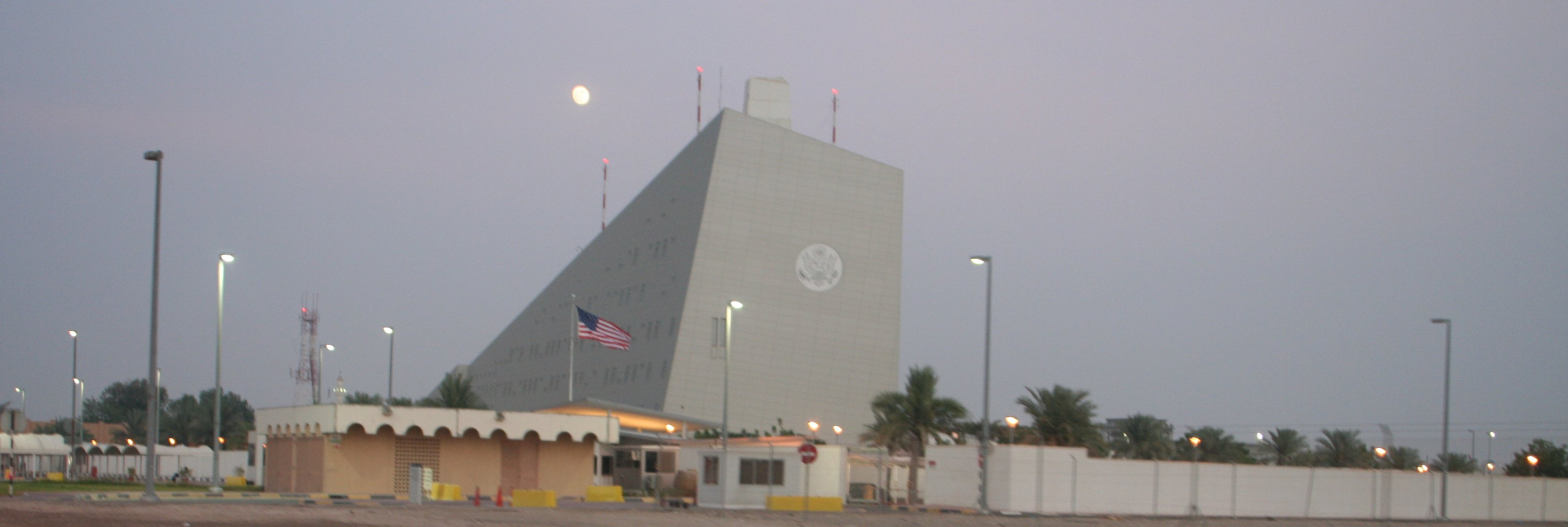
Embassy of the United States, Abu Dhabi

== See also ==
- Foreign relations of the United Arab Emirates
- Foreign relations of the United States
- Americans in the United Arab Emirates
- Emirati Americans
