= Americans in the United Arab Emirates =

Ethnic group in the United Arab Emirates

Total population
- 50,000 (2015); 0.52% of the UAE's population

Regions with significant populations
- Dubai · Abu Dhabi · Sharjah

Languages
- American English · Spanish and Arabic

Related ethnic groups
- Americans

Americans in the United Arab Emirates are residents of the United Arab Emirates (UAE) who originate from the United States. As of 2015, there are over 50,000 Americans living in the country.

== Demographics ==
The majority of Americans are based in Dubai. Due to the extensive military cooperation between both countries, there is also around 5,000 American military personnel stationed at the Al Dhafra Air Base in Abu Dhabi. The base, which is operated jointly, is one of the key US military bases in the region.

== Education ==
There are numerous American international schools in the UAE, serving expatriate students. Some of the notable schools are the American Community School of Abu Dhabi, American International School in Abu Dhabi, American School of Dubai, Dubai American Academy, GEMS American Academy and the Sharjah American International School. In addition, there are also several American-accredited universities in the country, such as the American University in Dubai, Hult International Business School, International Horizons College, Rochester Institute of Technology - Dubai, the New York University Abu Dhabi and the American University of Sharjah.

== Organisations ==
The United States has an embassy in Abu Dhabi and a consulate-general in Dubai which provide services to American citizens. There are also expatriate and business organizations, such as the American Women's Association in Dubai, the American Women's Network of Abu Dhabi an American Chamber of Commerce Abu Dhabi and an American Business Council of Dubai and the Northern Emirates.

== See also ==
- United Arab Emirates–United States relations
- American diaspora
- Emirati Americans
