= Tom Barrack =

American investor and diplomat (born 1947)

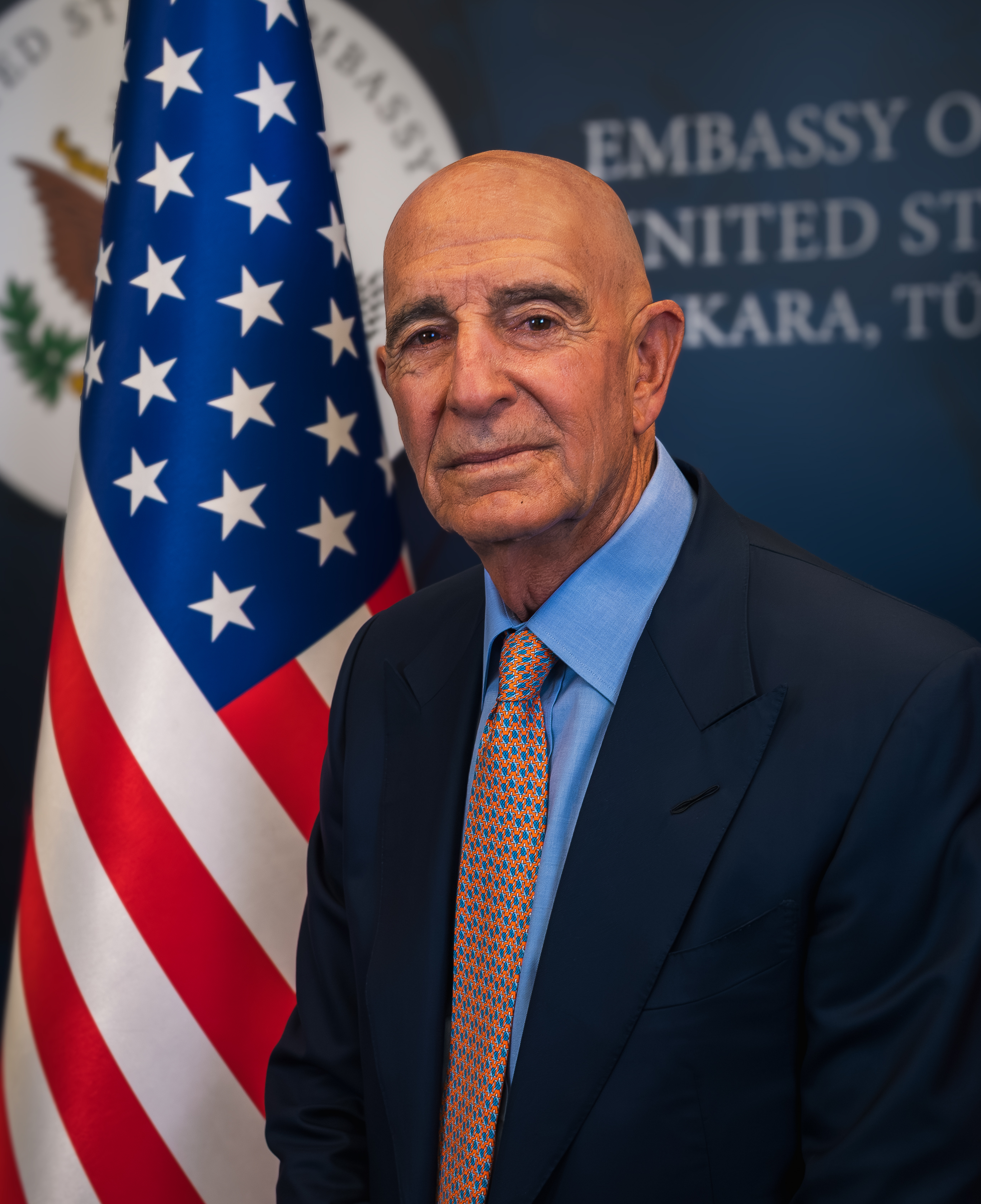
- Official portrait, 2025

United States Ambassador to Turkey
- Incumbent
- Assumed office May 14, 2025
- President: Donald Trump
- Preceded by: Jeff Flake

United States Presidential Envoy for Syria
- Incumbent
- Assumed office May 31, 2026
- President: Donald Trump
- Preceded by: Himself as Special Envoy

United States Presidential Envoy for Iraq
- Incumbent
- Assumed office January 31, 2026
- President: Donald Trump
- Preceded by: Mark Savaya

United States Special Envoy for Syria
- In office May 23, 2025 – May 29, 2026
- President: Donald Trump
- Preceded by: Joel Rayburn

United States Deputy Undersecretary of the Interior
- In office January 5, 1983 – c. March 1983
- President: Ronald Reagan
- Secretary: James G. Watt
- Succeeded by: William Horn

Personal details
- Born: Thomas Joseph Barrack Jr. April 28, 1947 (age 79) Los Angeles County, California, U.S.
- Party: Republican
- Spouse: Rachelle Roxborough (m. 2014; div. 2016)
- Children: 6
- Education: University of Southern; California (BA); University of San Diego (JD)

Thomas Joseph Barrack Jr. (born April 28, 1947) is an American diplomat, private equity real estate investor and the founder and retired chairman of Colony Capital, a publicly traded real estate investment trust. Following his U.S. Senate confirmation, Barrack has served as United States Ambassador to Turkey since May 2025.

Barrack has for decades been a close friend of and fundraiser for U.S. President Donald Trump, representing him in television news appearances. He was senior advisor to Trump's 2016 presidential campaign and served as the chairman of his Inaugural Committee. In Trump's second administration, Barrack serves as the United States Ambassador to Turkey, United States Special Envoy for Syria and the United States Special Envoy for Iraq.

== Early life and education ==
Barrack's grandparents were Lebanese Christians who immigrated in 1900 to the United States from Zahlé. Barrack was raised in Culver City, California, where his father was a grocer and his mother was a secretary.

In 1969, Barrack earned a Bachelor of Arts degree from the University of Southern California (USC), where he participated on their varsity rugby team. He then attended the USC Gould School of Law, where he was an editor of the Southern California Law Review, before receiving a Juris Doctor from the University of San Diego School of Law in 1972.

== Early career ==
Barrack's first job was at the law firm of Herbert W. Kalmbach, President Richard Nixon's personal lawyer. In 1972, the firm sent him to Saudi Arabia, where he soon became the squash partner of a Saudi prince. He then worked in the kingdom for the Fluor Corporation, and worked for Saudi princes. Shortly after, he helped open diplomatic relations between Saudi Arabia and Haiti, then ruled by Jean-Claude Duvalier, at the request of investor Lonnie Dunn.

In 1982, Barrack served as deputy undersecretary of the United States Department of the Interior under James G. Watt in the Reagan administration. The Secret Service would board its horses at Barrack's ranch when President Ronald Reagan was at his nearby Rancho del Cielo. Watt made his resignation announcement at Barrack's ranch. Barrack says he became disillusioned with government service after he was required to testify before a congressional committee due to a gift Barrack had paid to the purchaser of then-Attorney General Edwin Meese's house.

== Business career ==
In 1987, Barrack was later a principal with the Robert M. Bass Group. In 1985, Barrack first dealt with Donald Trump when he sold Trump a one-fifth stake in the Alexander's department stores. In 1988, Trump agreed to pay Barrack $410 million for total ownership of the Plaza Hotel. He later lost both properties in bankruptcy.

In 1990, Barrack founded Colony Capital, with initial investments by Bass and GE Capital, and later Eli Broad, Merrill Lynch, and Koo Chen-fu. Barrack achieved 50% profits in his first two years by focusing on distressed properties, including the federal Resolution Trust Corporation. He has invested some $200 million in Middle East real estate, $534 million in non-performing German real estate loans, and made a $24 million loan to photographer Annie Leibovitz. He also owned Neverland Ranch which was once the home of mega superstar Michael Jackson. Through Colony Capital, he runs a $25 billion portfolio of assets, from the Fairmont Raffles Hotels International hotel chain in Asia, the Aga Khan's former resort in Sardinia, Resorts International Holdings, One&Only Resorts, Atlantis, etc.

Colony American Homes was criticized for treating tenants poorly during the Great Recession, raising rents, evicting people in large numbers and failing to maintain properties.

Barrack has previously negotiated drilling rights with Mana Al Otaiba. In 2009, Barrack negotiated with Otaiba's son, Ambassador Yousef Al Otaiba, the sale of a $41 million stake in the Raffles L'Ermitage hotel to the Abu Dhabi Investment Authority.

In 2010, Barrack bought $70 million of Jared Kushner's debt on 666 Fifth Avenue. Kushner later avoided bankruptcy when Barrack agreed to reduce his obligations after a request by Trump.

As of September 2011, Barrack was the 833rd richest person in the world, and the 375th richest in the United States, with an estimated wealth of $1.1. billion USD. However, he was no longer a billionaire in 2014.

In 2012, Barrack sold the Paris Saint-Germain F.C. to the Qatar Investment Authority. Barrack had to pay €22 million to settle tax charges related to the 2012 sale of his resort on Costa Smeralda to the Qatari sovereign wealth fund.

In 2010, Barrack partnered with the Qatar Investment authority to purchase the film production company Miramax for $660 million. In 2016, Barrack sold Miramax to the Qatari beIN Media Group at a fourfold profit. In October 2017, Barrack's Colony Capital agreed to invest in The Weinstein Company to keep it afloat in light of the sexual misconduct allegations against the company's co-founder, Harvey Weinstein. The New York Times reported that the preliminary agreement with Weinstein fell apart and the acquisition broke down, in part because Colony Capital required the deal would not enrich Weinstein.

=== Colony NorthStar merger ===
On June 3, 2016, Barrack's Colony Capital announced an all-stock three-way merger with two NorthStar affiliates to form Colony NorthStar, which would have managed $58 billion in assets and carried a pro-forma equity market capitalization of $7 billion and total capitalization of $17 billion.

Management projected core FFO of $1.40–1.58 per share and targeted dividends of $1.08 per share for 2017, but new FINRA rules requiring clearer REIT fee disclosures undermined the firm’s fundraising efforts by revealing fee levels that deterred prospective clients.

On March 1, 2018, Colony NorthStar reported core FFO of $1.16 per share (22% below guidance), cut its dividend by 60%, and wrote down its Investment Management division by $375 million, causing the stock to fall 23% to $6.00.

=== Other ===
In 2017, Barrack sold a $70 million stake in One California Plaza to the Abu Dhabi crown prince's investment fund. During the first 18 months of the Trump administration, Colony NorthStar raised 24% of its $7 billion in investment from the United Arab Emirates (UAE) or Saudi Arabia.

Barrack used Cayman Islands entities to invest pension fund money in distressed real estate and send money towards the Colony parent company, according to an organization chart that surfaced in the Paradise Papers documents leaked from the Appleby law firm

Barrack is a trustee at the University of Southern California. He has also served on the board of directors of Accor, Kerzner International, First Republic Bank, Continental Airlines, Korea First Bank, and Megaworld Properties & Holdings. French president Nicolas Sarkozy awarded him France's Chevalier de la Légion d'honneur.

== Political activity ==
Barrack endorsed Donald Trump during the 2016 United States presidential election. He was a major fundraiser for Trump's campaign through the "Rebuilding America Now" Super PAC, which raised $23 million.

Barrack recommended that Trump hire Paul Manafort as his campaign manager. Barrack first met Manafort in the 1970s when they were both working for the Saudis and living in Beirut. In 2007, Barrack had loaned Manafort $1.5 million to refinance a home in the Hamptons.

On April 26, 2016, Barrack began an email correspondence with one of his business partners, UAE Ambassador Yousef Al Otaiba, reassuring him that Trump had investments in the UAE. "The emails were the beginning of Mr. Trump's improbable transformation from a candidate who campaigned against Muslims to a president celebrated in the royal courts of Riyadh and Abu Dhabi," according to New York Times writer David D. Kirkpatrick, who characterized this as a testament to Barrack's "unique place in the Trump world". On May 26, Barrack wrote to Otaiba to introduce Jared Kushner, and the two met later that month. On July 13, Barrack conveyed to Otaiba that Trump had removed from the Republican party platform the plank calling for the release of the 28 pages of redacted information from the 9/11 Commission Report.

On July 21, Barrack spoke at the 2016 Republican National Convention. In September 2016, Barrack helped set up a meeting between Trump and the Emir of Qatar in Trump Tower, although, as Kilpatrick noted, none of the investments brought in from the gulf by Barrack's firm in the two years following that meeting came from Qatar. After Trump became president, Barrack continued to act as a middleman between him and Arab princes.

Barrack served as chairman of the committee overseeing the 2017 Trump inauguration, for which he raised over $100 million, doubling the previous record. Barrack hired Rick Gates, first to help run the inauguration and, following that, as a consultant for his company. Gates was fired from the latter position in October 2017, the day he was indicted.

In a 2017 article in The Washington Post, Barrack commented on Trump's inflammatory rhetoric and proposals to ban immigrants from certain Muslim countries and put up a border wall with Mexico. "He's better than this," he said. He denies a quote attributed to him in the 2018 book Fire and Fury, that Trump was "not only crazy" but "stupid".

Barrack was interviewed during the Special Counsel investigation into Russian interference in the 2016 election, in particular regarding Paul Manafort, Rick Gates, Konstantin Kilimnik, the Trump campaign, the Trump transition team, and the financing of the Trump inauguration.

Throughout the election campaign, transition period and inauguration process, Barrack is said to have had been in touch with people having ties in the ruling family of the United Arab Emirates, including Rashid al-Malik, a friend and business associate of Barrack and Yousef Al Otaiba, the UAE's ambassador to the US. According to a New York Times report published in July 2019, Barrack also exchanged emails with Malik, sharing with him a draft of Trump's energy policy speech to seek approval on the 'pro-gulf region language'. Malik, as per the emails, "circulated the draft among Emirati and Saudi officials" to seek further approval, followed by Barrack incorporating the language suggested by Malik in the draft sent to Paul Manafort, Trump's campaign chairman at the time.

In 2021, Barrack denied involvement in Trump's pardon of Robert Zangrillo, a developer and investor who was charged in the 2019 college admissions bribery scandal for his alleged role in getting his daughter accepted into USC. The White House had listed Barrack as a supporter of the pardon.

Barrack was allegedly directed by the UAE officials to meet former congressman Steve Stockman. Between February and March 15, 2017, the Emirates also asked Barrack to endorse the appointment of Stockman as the U.S. ambassador to the UAE. The Emirati plans were, however, interrupted after Stockman was arrested for stealing and using charity money for personal expenses.

== Indictment for foreign lobbying and acquittal ==
On July 20, 2021, Barrack and his business protege Matthew Grimes were indicted as an agent working at the direction of a foreign power, obstructing justice, and making false statements to law enforcement. He was jailed for two days before being released on $250 million bond secured by $5 million in cash. The indictment was broadened in May 2022 to include allegations that Barrack sought hundreds of millions of dollars in investments from the United Arab Emirates while illegally lobbying the Trump administration on its behalf.

In July 2017, in an interview with a State Department investigator, which was conducted to determine whether or not Barrack would be a threat to national security as an ambassador, he failed to provide names of the four Emiratis, who on behalf of the UAE government assigned Barrack to influence the Trump campaign. Barrack only mentioned the names of Al Waleed bin Talal Al Saud, Nacho Figueras and Roberto Hernandez Ramirez.

On November 4, 2022, Barrack and Matthew Grimes were both found not guilty.

== Trump administration ==
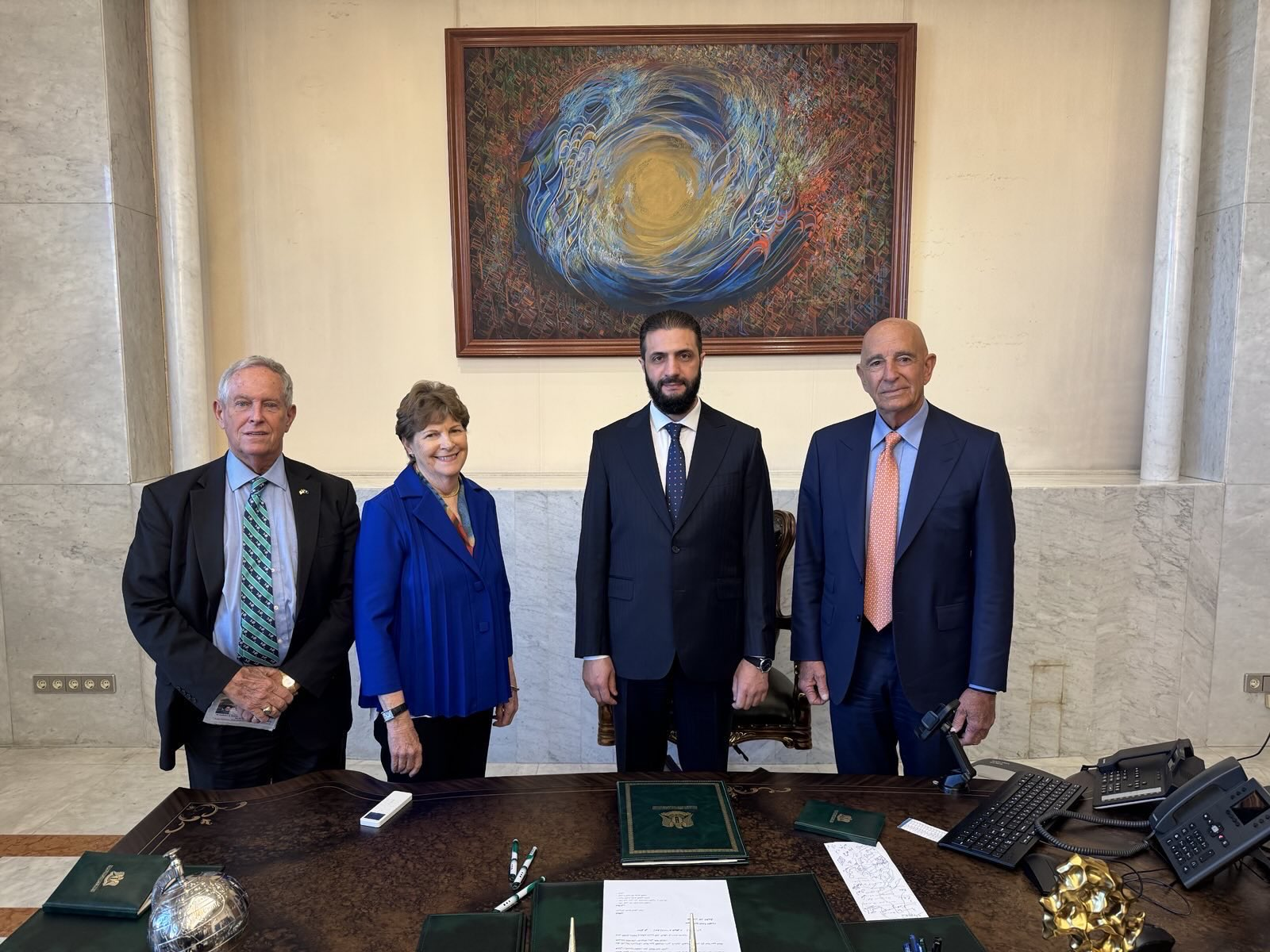
Barrack, U.S. Congressman Joe Wilson, and U.S. Senator Jeanne Shaheen, met with Syrian President Ahmed al-Sharaa, August 2025

In December 2024, President Trump nominated Barrack as the new U.S. ambassador to Turkey. The Senate confirmed him in a 60–36 vote on April 29, 2025. He presented his credentials to Turkish President Recep Tayyip Erdoğan on May 14, 2025. He was also selected by Trump as the new United States Special Envoy for Syria on May 23, 2025. He later brokered the July 2025 ceasefire between Israel and Syria amid the Southern Syria clashes, urging Druze, Bedouin, and Sunni factions to disarm and promoting a unified Syrian identity with regional support from Turkey and Jordan.

In August 2025, Barrack was heavily criticized in Lebanon after telling a group of journalists to "act civilized" and describing them as "animalistic" as they questioned him about the Trump Administration's plans for the south of the country, prompting outrage from the Lebanese media and journalists' union. The Lebanese presidency issued a statement expressing regret over the comments by "one of its guests". The backlash caused Barrack to cancel a planned trip the following day to South Lebanon. He later apologized over the remarks.

In his capacity as the U.S. envoy to Syria, Barrack showed himself as "an outspoken advocate" of the Syrian president Ahmed al-Sharaa. He oversaw the Israeli-Syrian security talks in Paris that opened the way for the Syrian transitional government to conduct the 2026 northeastern Syria offensive against the Kurdish-led Syrian Democratic Forces, a PKK-linked U.S. partner against ISIS during the civil war, and backed the terms of the two ceasefires offered by Sharaa to the SDF later in the month.

== Personal life ==
In 2014, Barrack married Rachelle Roxborough. They divorced in 2016. He has six children.

His family is based in Los Angeles, California. He also owns a 1,200-acre mountain ranch near Santa Barbara, California, as well as Happy Canyon Vineyards in the Happy Canyon of Santa Barbara AVA, and a tasting room in downtown Santa Barbara. He is Roman Catholic. In 2014, Barrack bought a house in Santa Monica for $21 million, which he later sold for $35 million, the highest price for a residence in that area. In 2017, he purchased a $15.5 million home in Aspen, Colorado.

=== Relationship to Jeffrey Epstein ===
According to the already published Epstein files, Tom Barrack networked and socialized with Jeffrey Epstein since at least the 1990s, and continued to communicate and meet with him for years following Epstein's 2008 conviction for soliciting a minor. On 9 March 2016, Epstein emailed Barrack asking, "send photos of you and child. --make me smile".

== Awards and honors ==
- 2000, Golden Plate Award of the American Academy of Achievement
- 2005, Lloyd Greif Center for Entrepreneurial Studies’ Entrepreneur of the Year Award
- 2010, Chevalier de la Légion d’Honneur, an award bestowed by the French government for citizens and foreigners

== See also ==
- Timeline of Russian interference in the 2016 United States elections

Diplomatic posts
Preceded by Jeff Flake	United States Ambassador to Turkey; 2025–present	Incumbent
