= Mark Savaya =

American businessman (born 1985)

United States Special Envoy for Iraq
- In office October 19, 2025 – January 31, 2026
- President: Donald Trump
- Preceded by: Position established
- Succeeded by: Tom Barrack

Personal details
- Born: 1985 (age 40–41) Iraqi Republic

Mark Savaya (Arabic: مارك سافايا; born 1985) is an Iraqi American businessman who had served as the United States special envoy to Iraq from October 2025 to January 2026.

== Early life ==
Mark Savaya was born in 1985 in Iraq. The Savayas originate from Tel Keif. He belongs to the indigenous Assyrian minority and is a member of the Chaldean Catholic Church.

== Career ==
=== Special envoy to Iraq (2025–2026) ===
In September 2025, Savaya helped mediate the release of Elizabeth Tsurkov, a Russian-Israeli researcher who had been abducted by Kata'ib Hezbollah in Baghdad in 2023. Following her release, Tsurkov publicly thanked Savaya on social media. On October 19, 2025, president Donald Trump named Savaya as the United States special envoy for Iraq. On 31 January, 2026, sources close to the post stated that Savaya was no longer filling its role. One of the sources pointed to Savaya's "mishandling" of key situations, including his failure to prevent the nomination of former Iraqi prime minister Nouri al-Maliki to be the country's next premier, a move Trump openly warned Baghdad against.

=== Marijuana dispensary career (2018–2025) ===
Savaya worked in the convenience store industry before co-founding Future Grow Solutions in Birmingham, Michigan, after the legalization of cannabis in Michigan in November 2018. In 2019, he purchased a complex formerly owned by Charter Steel. The company established Leaf and Bud, a chain of cannabis dispensaries based in Detroit.

Savaya has expressed interest in public and scientific discussions regarding plant-based medicine, including the regulated use of marijuana. His advocacy centers on the integration of plant-derived therapies into wellness practices under medical supervision. In Michigan, he has supported programs described as patient-centered initiatives for individuals undergoing cancer treatment.

=== Political activities ===
Savaya donated US$10,000 to Donald Trump's presidential campaign in June 2020. By February 2024, he had donated US$8,000 to Mary Sheffield, the president of the Detroit City Council and a candidate in the 2025 Detroit mayoral election. That year, Savaya appeared at several Trump rallies and with Trump allies in Michigan during Trump's 2024 presidential campaign. Additionally, he donated US$2,500 and US$5,000 to political action committees for Michigan governor Gretchen Whitmer and state representative Alabas Farhat that year, respectively. After Trump named Massad Boulos as his senior advisor for Arab and Middle Eastern affairs, Boulos and Savaya were photographed at a weekend party in Bloomfield Hills.

=== Real estate and other ventures ===
Mark Savaya has been involved in real estate redevelopment projects, including the conversion of the former Charter Steel facility into a cannabis production complex in collaboration with Center Line Group One and Nate Group. The facility, which occupies approximately 40,000 square feet, is planned to include areas for cannabis cultivation, processing, and retail provisioning at a single site.

Savaya purchased the property in 2019 and announced plans to invest about US$7–8 million in building upgrades, focusing on safety, security, and production infrastructure. Future Grow Solutions, a company associated with Savaya, has also announced the development of a separate 100,000-square-foot cannabis facility in Detroit.

In May 2024, he became involved in a dispute over billboards advertising "The Mark Savaya Collection", a strain of cannabis that he claimed to have bred himself, after Angela Whitfield-Calloway, a member of the Detroit City Council, requested that the Legislative Policy Division issue a report detailing how the billboards should be removed, citing their prevalence. Savaya's lawyer contended that the billboards did not explicitly market to minors and featured Savaya because of his involvement in the product. In October, Whitfield-Calloway proposed a draft city code amendment imposing restrictions for alcohol advertisements on cannabis dispensary advertisements.

== Controversy ==
Savaya’s appointment as United States Special Envoy to Iraq in 2025 drew criticism regarding his qualifications and the broader implications for U.S., Iraq relations. Some analysts questioned the selection of a businessman without prior diplomatic experience, viewing it as part of a trend toward politicized foreign policy appointments. Former Iraqi Foreign Minister Hoshyar Zebari stated that the appointment reflected U.S. concerns about Iraq’s political stability and institutional governance.

Accusations of Interference in Iraqi Affairs

During his tenure as envoy, Savaya's public remarks, which included emphasizing that "no place" existed for armed groups operating outside of state authority, were met with controversy in Iraq. Some political factions and critics characterized these statements as interference in Iraq's domestic affairs. These critics viewed the remarks as reflecting a U.S. effort to influence internal Iraqi matters, particularly regarding armed militias and the government formation process.

Savaya also warned that the United States would not tolerate "outside interference" in the formation of Iraq's government. This stance was reportedly viewed by some Iraqi political groups as an attempt to exert pressure on domestic political negotiations.

== Views ==
After being appointed special envoy for Iraq, Savaya stated that Iraq's government should seek to have all armed groups operate through government authority.

== Works cited ==
- Aguilar, Louis (December 3, 2024). "Trump's selection of Middle East adviser Boulos prompts divisions in Metro Detroit". The Detroit News.
- Elrick, M. L. (February 11, 2024). "If money talks, Mary Sheffield is serious about wanting to be Detroit's next mayor". Detroit Free Press.
- ""From seed to sell," cannabis complex opening in Center Line". WJBK. August 20, 2020.
- "In a surprise move, Trump picks Assyrian-American as special envoy to Iraq". The Assyria Post. October 21, 2025.
- Kim, Minho (October 19, 2025). "President Trump named Mark Savaya, the founder of a Detroit-area marijuana dispensary, as his special enjoy to Iraq". The New York Times.
- Nann Burke, Melissa; Mauger, Craig (October 20, 2025). "Trump picks Metro Detroit marijuana businessman Mark Savaya as special envoy to Iraq". The Detroit News.
- Natinsky, Paul (August 26, 2021). "Cashing in on the Michigan Marijuana Business". The Chaldean News.
- Rahal, Sarah (June 24, 2024). "Cannabis billboards seem to be everywhere. One Michigan city may respond". The Detroit News.
- Rozovsky, Liza (October 3, 2025). "Elizabeth Tsurkov, freed from captivity in Iraq: 'I have no words to describe the joy. Every hostage deserves to feel this'". Haaretz.
- Spangler, Todd (October 20, 2025). "Trump names marijuana entrepreneur from Michigan as Iraq envoy". Detroit Free Press.
- Tinsley, Bre'Anna (May 10, 2024). "Detroit Councilwoman Calloway is calling for a ban on cannabis billboards". WDET.
- Turner, Grace (October 7, 2020). "Local Cannabis Company Opens Growing, Processing Facility". DBusiness.
- "US Envoy urges Baghdad to bring all armed groups under state control". Shafaq. October 30, 2025.
- Walsh, Dustin (October 18, 2024). "Detroit may put limits on marijuana billboards". Crain's Detroit Business.
