= Emirati Americans =

الأميركيين الإماراتيين
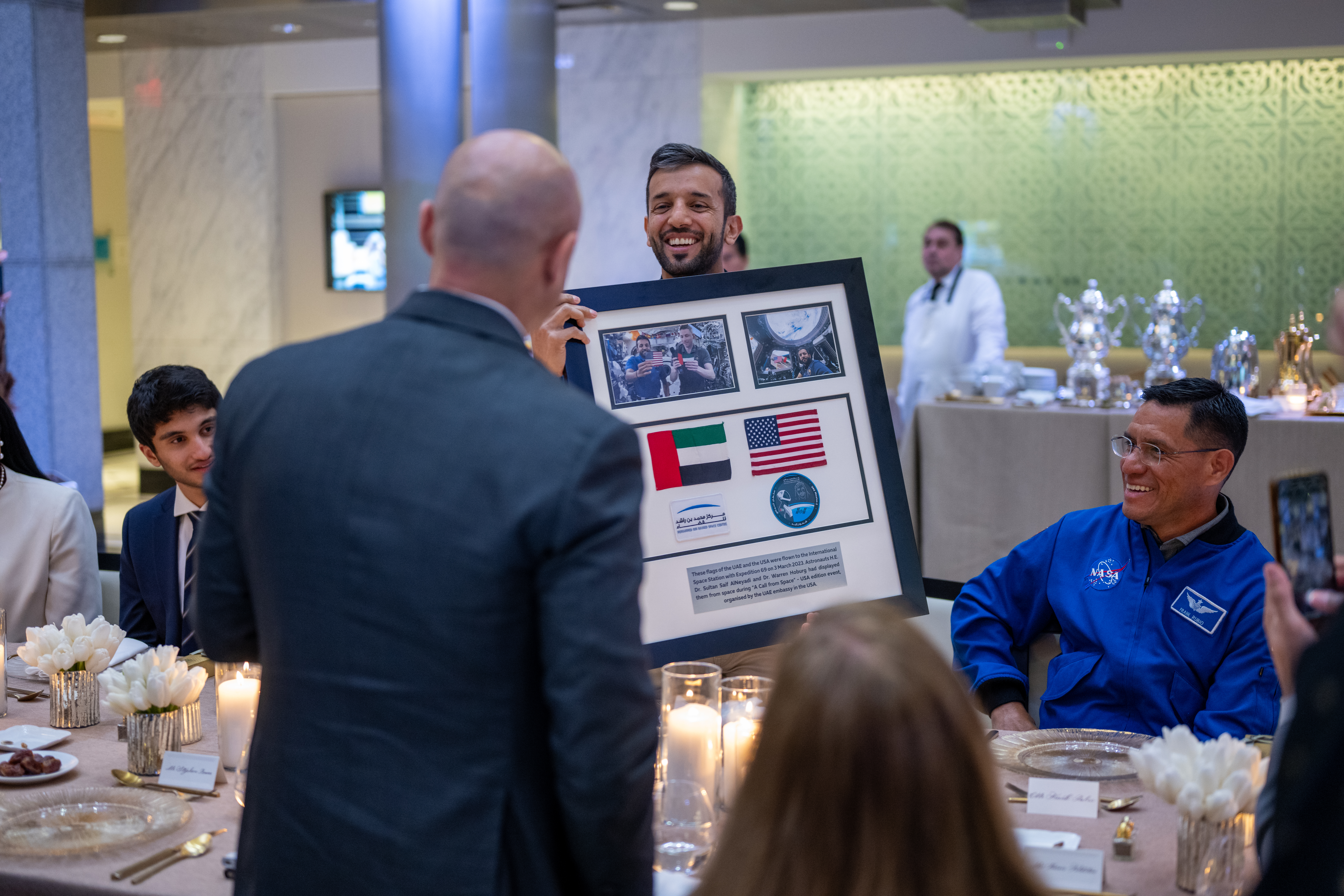
- Emirati astronaut Sultan Al Neyadi presents a gift to NASA astronauts.

Total population
- By ancestry or ethnic origin (2020 US Census); 2,480: Emirati-born, 2023; 26,444

Regions with significant populations
- United States of America · United Arab Emirates

Languages
- American English · Emirati Arabic

Religion
- Sunni Islam, Shia Islam

Related ethnic groups
- Arab Americans, Americans, Emiratis

Emirati Americans (Standard Arabic: الأميركيون الإماراتيون; Emirati Arabic: الأميركيين الإماراتيين) are Americans who have roots, origin, and descent from the United Arab Emirates.

== Demographics ==
There are over 18,000 Emiratis in the US, the vast majority of whom are students pursuing education across various universities and institutes. According to a report produced by the Institute of International Education, there were more than 1,200 Emiratis living and studying at US universities during the 2008–09 academic year. This was a 24 percent jump from the previous year and reflected the growing trend of Emirati students choosing the U.S. as a base for higher education.

Out of those figures, 60 percent were undergraduate students, 17 percent were graduate and 21 percent were studying at a non-degree (English language and other short-term training or non-degree programme) level. A further 2 per cent were proceeding with optional practical training after the conclusion of their academic courses. The UAE government has implemented a wide range of services to Emirati nationals in the US, often in the form of financial support and funding. It is estimated that there is a very small diaspora, mainly because the UAE provides them with more than adequate welfare benefits, removing the need to live and work in other developed countries. Some long-settled Emiratis in the US have acquired American citizenship over the years.

The US remains one of the most popular destinations for Emirati students. As of the 2012/13 academic year, there were over 2,250 UAE students studying in the US.

== Notable people ==
- Ali Alexander
- Mohammed Fairouz
- Khalid Eisa

== See also ==
- Arab Americans
- Emirati diaspora
- Americans in the United Arab Emirates
- United Arab Emirates–United States relations
