= American International School, Abu Dhabi =

The American International School of Abu Dhabi (AISA)
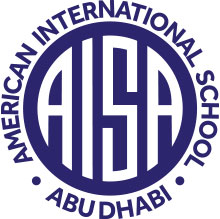

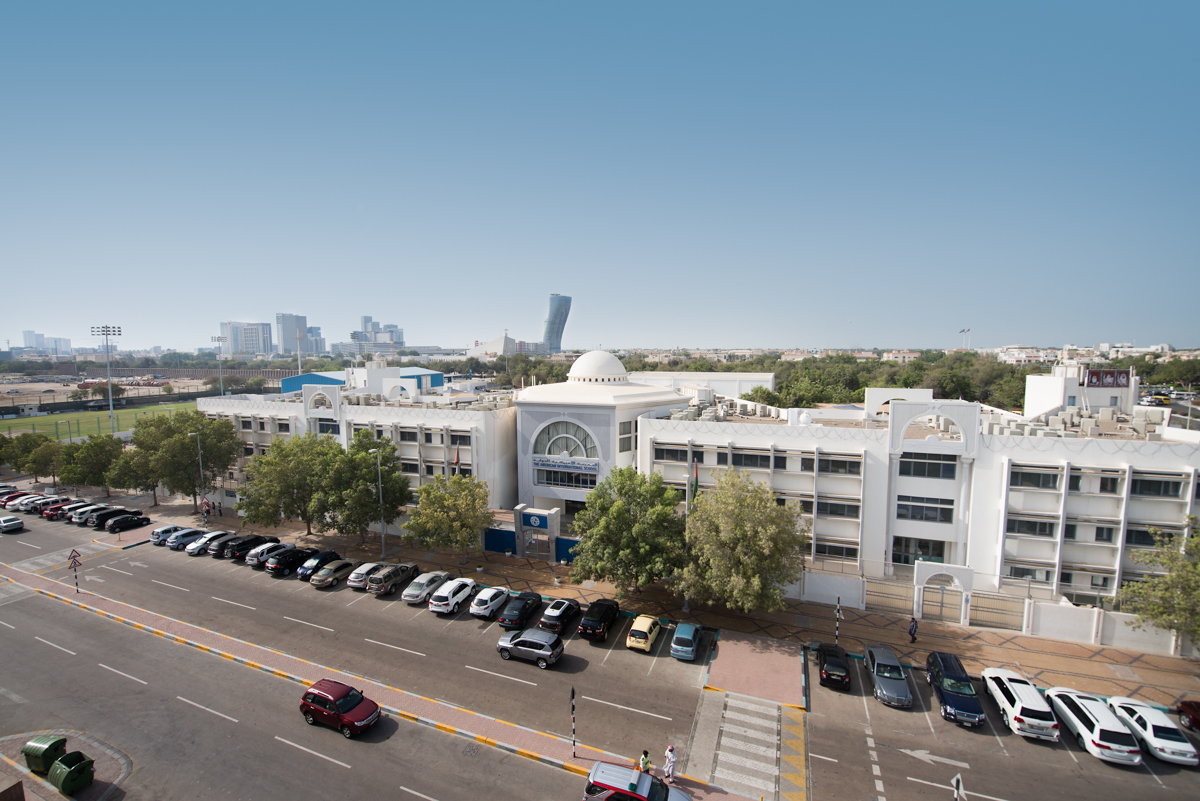
- School in 2015

Location
- 29th Street, Airport Road, Abu Dhabi; Emirate of Abu Dhabi; United Arab Emirates
- Coordinates: 24°25′47″N 54°25′51″E

Information
- School type: Private international school
- Motto: Empowering Tomorrow's Leaders, Today
- Established: 1995; 31 years ago
- Founder: ESOL Education
- Sister school: American School Hong Kong; Dunecrest American School; Fairgreen International School; The American International School in Egypt; Cairo English School; American International School in Cyprus; Universal College
- School board: International Baccalaureate (IB), American Curriculum
- School number: 117
- Director: Andrew Torris
- Secondary School Principal: Brian Kelley
- Elementary School Principal: Dr. Kevin Fosburgh
- Grades: K-12
- Gender: Co-educational in K-5, IBDP; Gender segregated in 6-12
- Student to teacher ratio: 10:1 (Student-to-teacher)
- Language: English
- Hours in school day: 7 hours
- Student Union/Association: Elementary StuCo, Middle School StuCo, High School StuCo
- Athletics conference: Near East Schools Activities Conference (NESAC)
- School fees: $8,386 (AED 30800) to $15,247 (AED 56000)
- Affiliations: IB-PYP, IBDP, American Diploma
- Alumni: Khalid Al Ameri
- Website: aisa.sch.ae

The American International School, Abu Dhabi is a private, for profit international Preschool-12th grade school offering an American curriculum. The college-preparatory IB Diploma Program (IBDP) is offered in grades 11 and 12, and the IB Primary Years Program (IBPYP) is offered from KG to Grade 5. The school is coeducational in elementary, and gender-segregated in secondary (except for students taking the IB Diploma Program, where it remains coeducational).

== History of AISA ==
The American International School of Abu Dhabi was founded in 1995 by ESOL Education. It was officially founded to serve American and other expatriate communities residing in Abu Dhabi, however, it also serves members of the local community.

== Campus details ==
The school is located in Abu Dhabi, United Arab Emirates. The school has two libraries, a prayer mosque, a drama room, an art room, a music room, a swimming pool, six science laboratories, 2 AstroTurf pitches, two gymnasiums, two outdoor basketball courts, and 2 medium soccer field used for soccer tournaments and major outdoor events.

The campus accommodates three levels of schooling. The elementary level consists of 700 students, the middle school level consists of 395 students, and the high school level consists of 650 students. The school is coeducational in elementary, and gender-segregated in secondary. The total number of students is approximately 1,380 students, and the students come from around 75 countries.

The American International School, Abu Dhabi's campus is located in proximity to the Embassy of the United States to the United Arab Emirates.

== International and national accreditations ==
AISA is accredited by the Middle States Association of Colleges and Schools, the Council of International Schools, and the UAE Ministry of Education. It is authorized by the International Baccalaureate Organization to offer the Primary Years Programme and the IB Diploma Programs. AISA is a full member of both the Near East South Asian Association of Overseas Schools (NESA) as well as the European Council of International Schools (ECIS).

== Curriculum ==
The school in offers an American high school diploma program and the International Baccalaureate program. Students in Kindergarten to grade 5 follow the U.S. Curriculum within the IB Primary Years Program (IB-PYP). In grades 6–9, students continue to follow the American curriculum. High school students can choose between the U.S. High School Diploma, or the IB Diploma Program. Students interested in participating in AISA's IB Diploma Program (IBDP) will have take entrance exams in english, math, and science. AISA as Abu Dhabi's first IBDP school offers unique subjects that are often not found in other schools in the city, such as IB Global Politics.

Arabic and Islamic subjects are maintained by the UAE Ministry of Education, and secondary science subjects follow the Next Generation Science Standards (NGSS).

== Activities ==
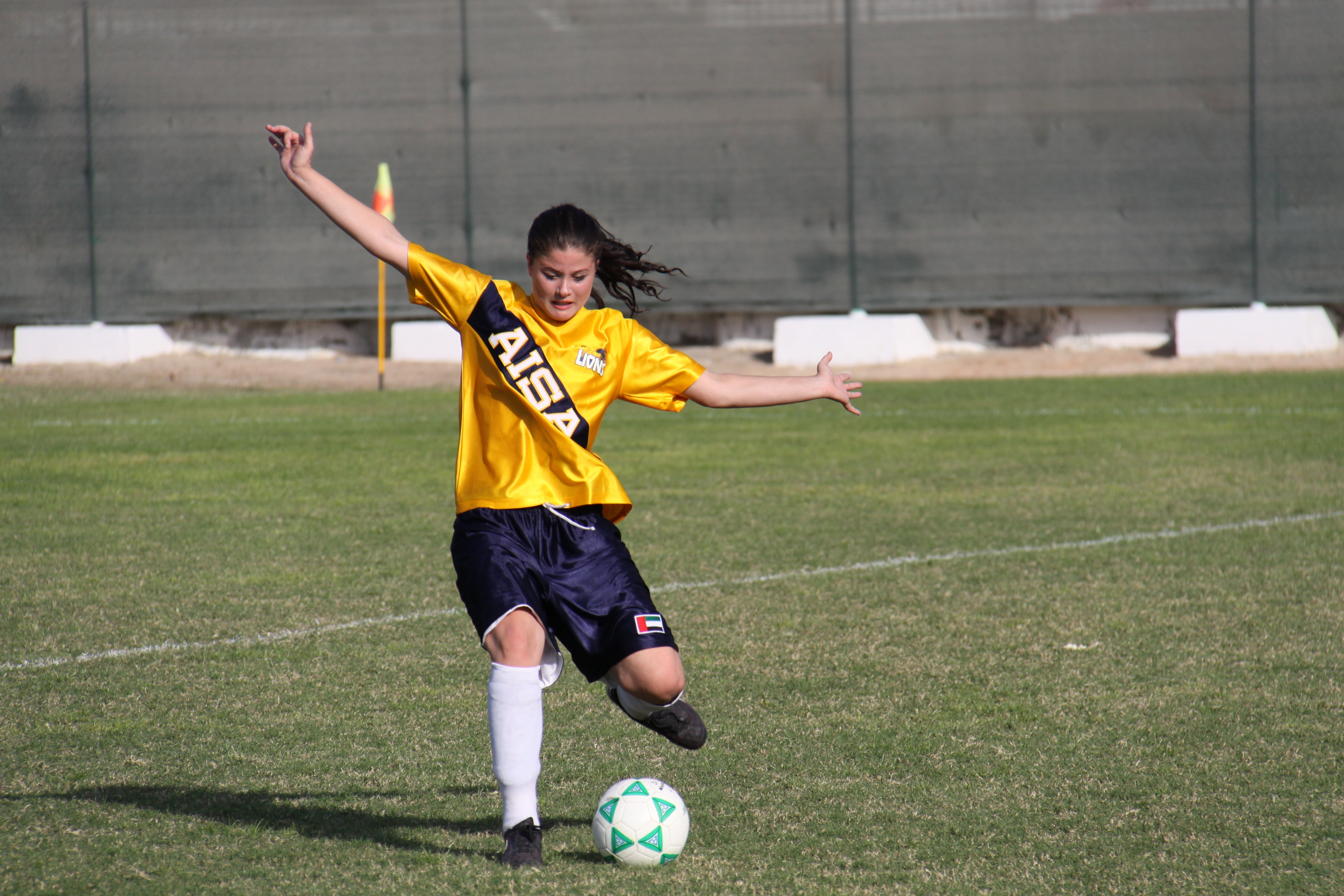
Sports at American International School in Abu Dhabi

AISA is a member of two leagues, the local UAE league that is composed of international schools in the country, called Emirates Athletics Conference (EAC), and the international league that is participated by the schools from all over the MENA region which is the OASIS Activities Conference (OAC). Among the sports offered at AISA are basketball, volleyball, badminton, soccer, swimming, cross country and track and field. Other sports such as softball and handball are only played during P.E., but not after school or in a league.

== AISA Clubs ==
Apart from sports, AISA also offers a wide variety of activities, such as Model United Nations, the schools biggest club, currently. AISA also offers artistic options for its students, with a Band club, as well as stage performances for both primary students, who are performing Aladdin Jr. The Musical in 2025, as well as secondary students who are performing Matilda Jr. The Musical in 2025.

== ADEK Inspection Report ==
The ADEK Inspection Report has labelled the American International School of Abu Dhabi as a "good" school. Strengths in academics were outlined; however, the report further published shortcomings of the Arabic language curriculum.

== See also ==
- Americans in the United Arab Emirates
