= Cha-am district =

Cha-am ชะอำ
- District
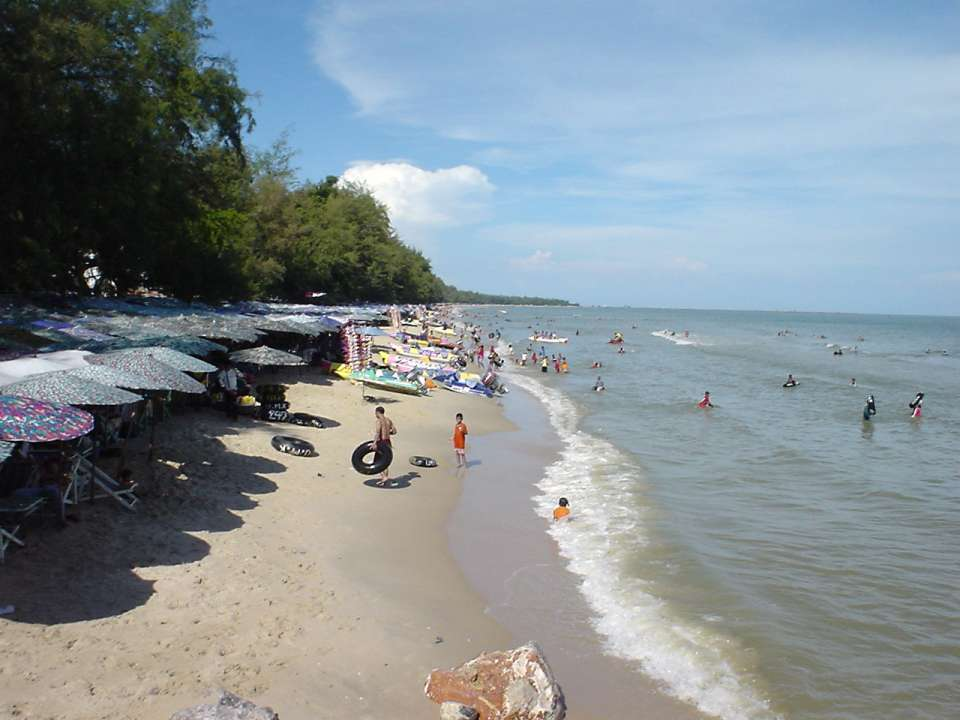
- Cha-am Beach

- District location in Phetchaburi province
- Coordinates: 12°47′59″N 99°58′1″E
- Country: Thailand
- Province: Phetchaburi
- Seat: Cha-am
- Subdistricts: 9

Area
  - Total: 660.65 km^{2} (255.08 sq mi)

Population (2021)
  - Total: 81,541
  - Density: 123.43/km^{2} (319.7/sq mi)
- Time zone: UTC+7 (ICT)
- Postal code: 76120
- Geocode: 7604

Cha-am (Thai: ชะอำ, pronounced [tɕʰáʔām] or [tɕʰāʔām]) is a district (amphoe) in the southern part of Phetchaburi province, western Thailand, forming the northern section of the Cha-am–Hua Hin coastal conurbation.

The district was established in 1897 with the name Na Yang. In 1914 the centre of the district was moved to Ban Nong Chok (now in Tha Yang district and its name was changed to Nong Chok. After World War II, the government moved the office to tambon Cha-am and also changed the district name to Cha-am.

Mrigadayavan Palace (Thai: พระราชนิเวศน์มฤคทายวัน, RTGS: Phra Ratchaniwet Maruekkhathayawan) in Cha-am district is a former residence of King Vajiravudh or Rama VI who ruled Siam from 1910 to 1925.

== Toponymy ==
Its name "Cha-am" is said to have originated from the word "Cha-an" (ชะอาน, pronounced [tɕʰáʔān] or [tɕāʔāːn]) meaning "to wash the saddle". In the Ayutthaya period, Viceroy Ekathotsarot (later King Ekathotsarot) raised an army to fight against the Burmese in this area, and washed his saddle here. Hence the name "Cha-an" and was distorted into "Cha-am" like today

== Location ==
Cha-am lies 173 km (107 mi) south of Bangkok on Phet Kasem Road. Just a few trains stop at the town's railway station. Frequent bus and minibus services link Cha-am with neighbouring towns, such as Hua Hin, and with Bangkok. The district to the north is Tha Yang district. 27 km (17 mi) to the south is Hua Hin district of Prachuap Khiri Khan province, also a beach resort.

== Administration ==
Cha-am district is divided into nine sub-districts (tambons).

1.	Cha-am	ชะอำ
2.	Bang Kao	บางเก่า
3.	Na Yang	นายาง
4.	Khao Yai	เขาใหญ่
5.	Nong Sala	หนองศาลา
6.	Huai Sai Nuea	ห้วยทรายเหนือ
7.	Rai Mai Phatthana	ไร่ใหม่พัฒนา
8.	Sam Phraya	สามพระยา
9.	Don Khun Huai	ดอนขุนห้วย

== Economy ==
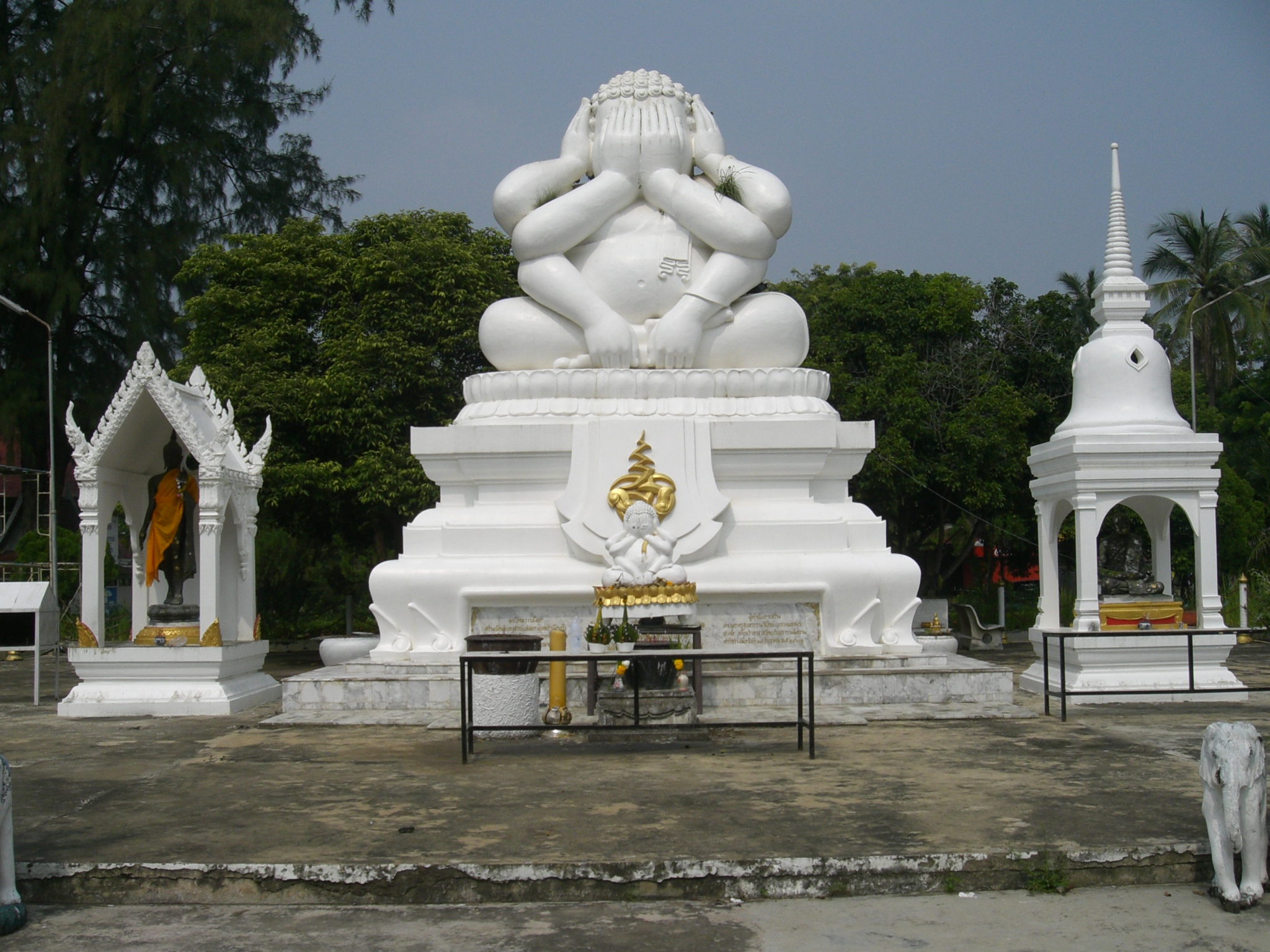
Phra Pit Thawan

Tourism plays a significant role in the economy of Cha-am and Phetchaburi Province. The province, however, has dropped from the fourth to the sixth most popular destination in Thailand due to coastal erosion, much of it in Cha-am, caused by rising sea levels leading to "deteriorating scenery".

== Education ==
Several tertiary educational institutions and universities are in Cha-am and surrounding districts including Silpakorn University (Phetchaburi IT Campus), Suan Dusit Rajaphat University, Stamford International University, and Webster University Thailand.
