= Chris Hall (university president) =

English-American politician and academic

Christopher G. Hall

Member of the Maine Senate from the 16th district
- In office 2002–2004
- Succeeded by: Peggy Rotundo

Member of the Maine House of Representatives from the 56th district
- In office 2000–2002
- Succeeded by: William M. Earle

Personal details
- Born: 7 June 1956 (age 70)
- Party: Democratic
- Education: Oxford University

Christopher G. Hall (born 7 June 1956) is an English-American politician and academic. Hall was the president of the American University in Kosovo and a former state senator from Maine. Hall's background is as a steel and mining executive, but after growing weary of long commutes from Portland, Maine, to New York City, he sought a career change. In 2002, Hall was elected as a Democratic senator in midcoast Maine in a disputed election in which he narrowly defeated Republican Leslie Fossel. He failed to win reelection in 2004, and in 2007 accepted the appointment to lead the American University in Kosovo. In May 2014, Hall was appointed president of International Horizons College in Dubai by its board of trustees.

== Career ==
Hall earned his bachelor's, master's, and doctoral degrees from Oxford University. He spent several years in the mining industry, including as an executive, and was an economics and public policy consultant in Portland, Maine.

He first was elected as member of the Maine House of Representatives in 2000, defeating John C. Harris in the 56th district. In 2002 Hall decided to run for State Senator in the 16th district against Leslie T. Fossel, which he won after a recount. In 2004, Hall ran in the 20th district, losing to Dana L. Dow, which marked the end of his political career.

From 2005 to 2006 Hall taught public policy courses at Central Maine Community College. In 2007, he was offered a position as president of the American University in Kosovo, and held that post until 2012. Hall had a longstanding interest in the Balkans, and had been one of the first Americans to visit Albania in 1990 when it reopened to tourists. In Kosovo, he found that decades of repression and war had left a legacy of setbacks within the educational system, and aspired to use the American University in Kosovo to help train the country's next generation of leaders.

Following his departure from Kosovo in 2012, Hall was named interim president of the York County Community College in Maine. In May 2014, he was appointed president of International Horizons College in Dubai.

== Personal life ==
Hall was married to the late Jacqueline Wardell, who ran a community bank in Maine that provided small business loans to women and minorities.
