= International Horizons College =

College in Dubai

- Other names: IHC
- Type: Private, international college
- Active: 2011–2016
- Academic affiliations: Commission for Academic Accreditation (CAA) of the United Arab Emirates Ministry of Higher Education and Scientific Research
- President: Dr. Christopher Hall
- Location: 42nd Floor U-Bora Towers, Dubai, United Arab Emirates; 25.1802°N 55.2706°E
- Website: www.ihc-dubai.com

International Horizons College (also known informally as IHC) was an American curriculum institution located within the Business Bay area of Dubai City. It was founded in July 2011 with the aim of providing high-performing students with affordable and accessible higher education within the Middle East North Africa South Asia (MENASA) region. Accredited and licensed by the Commission for Academic Accreditation (CAA) of the United Arab Emirates Ministry of Higher Education and Scientific Research, the college was an independent and international institution, servicing the academic needs of the undergraduate student body.

The college closed in 2016 due to not being successful in recruiting a sufficient number of students, and therefore the board decided it was no longer financially feasible to continue.

== Background ==
Structured on the American curriculum, IHC was envisioned by the founding members in July 2011, as a modern, 21st century college that provides the foundation and gateway to 100 elite universities in the USA. Upon the selection of the board in November of the same year, and the appointment of the university’s president as well as the dean, approval for the temporary campus at U-Bora Tower, Business Bay, Dubai was given until construction of the permanent campus can be completed in 2016.

The college’s mission, goals, by-laws, policies, vision and procedures were all approved prior to IHC applying for accreditation and licensure from the UAE government. During the period of installing the integrated classrooms, a small intake of students from the college’s applicants was selected and in August 2013, the first class officially began with 15 students from eight different nationalities making up the student body, ranging between the ages of 17 and 19 years.

Offering a 2+2 model, the students complete their first 2 years of the bachelor's degree in Dubai and final two years at universities in the US or other regions. The college has special articulation agreements with the University of Vermont and Rutgers University allowing students direct transfer options, as well as admission pathway to California State University (CSU) system of over 20 universities.

In June 2014, the Varkey Group, which owns and operates GEMS Education, acquired majority stakes in the holding company, which owns and represents the college. In June IHC also introduced Symbiosis International University (SIU) to the UAE market. Students can enroll for bachelors programs in Business (BBA), Technology (B Tech) and Liberal Arts (BA/B Sc) and then transfer to any of Symbiosis campuses to earn your degree and access to job placement services.

In May 2015, IHC signed an agreement with Webster University, effectively becoming a Global Pathway program and allowing its students to transfer to Webster’s several US campuses as well as its international campuses and programs in Austria, China, Ghana, Netherlands, Switzerland, Thailand and United Kingdom.

The college offers an array of student activities and student support services, ranging from UAE visa & relocation assistance, internship advisory and accommodation support. The college dormitory is embedded within the Auris Hotel Apartments in Dubai Sports City and opposite of Dubai Cricket Stadium.

== See also ==
- Americans in the United Arab Emirates
