= GEMS American Academy, Abu Dhabi =

Coordinates: 24.42880°N 54.56457°E

Location
- Theyab Bin Essa St. Abu Dhabi; Khalifa City; United Arab Emirates

Information
- Other names: GAA
- Type: Private
- Established: 2011
- Headmaster: Robert Rinaldo
- Grades: Kg- Gr12
- Age range: 4-18
- Enrollment: 1600
- Language: English
- Campus: Suburban
- Slogan: Inspire, Educate, Lead, Innovate
- Athletics: Basketball, soccer, volleyball, badminton, track & field, swimming
- Rival: barr
- Accreditation: Council of International Schools (CIS), New England Association of Schools and Colleges (NEASC)
- Tuition: Up to an estimated AED 70,500 AED per year
- Website: www.gemsaa-abudhabi.com/en/

The GEMS American Academy is a for-profit private school in Khalifa City, Abu Dhabi, United Arab Emirates. It offers an American curriculum as well as the International Baccalaureate (IB) curriculum. The school is a member of the GEMS Education network of schools.

== GAA History ==
GEMS American Academy (GAA) was founded in 2011 in central Abu Dhabi. On December 13, 2011, President Bill Clinton, the 42nd President of the United States, opened GAA in a new facility in Khalifa City in the presence of Sheikh Nahyan bin Mubarak Al Nahyan, UAE Minister of Higher Education and Scientific Research and Humaid Mohammed Al Khathami, UAE Minister of Education.

== See also ==
- Americans in the United Arab Emirates
