= Embassy of the United States, Abu Dhabi =

Diplomat Building

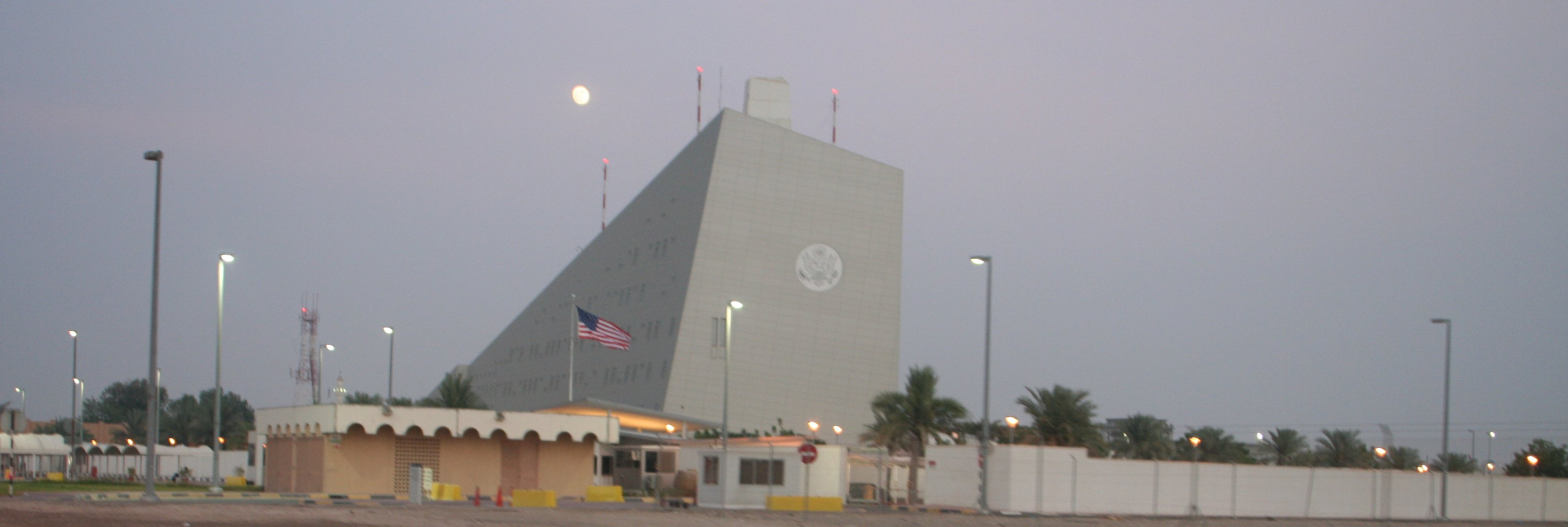
- Location: Abu Dhabi, United Arab Emirates
- Address: Plot 38 29th St, Al Rawdah, Abu Dhabi, United Arab Emirates
- Coordinates: 24°25′26″N 54°26′2″E
- Website: https://ae.usembassy.gov

The Embassy of the United States in Abu Dhabi is the diplomatic mission of the United States of America in United Arab Emirates.

== History ==
Before the formation of the United Arab Emirates (UAE), the region known as the Trucial States was under a British protectorate, with the United States having very limited relations with the individual sheikdoms. The UAE declared its independence on December 2, 1971, upon completion of treaties with Great Britain, and the United States recognized the new nation the following day, on December 3.

Diplomatic relations were formally established on March 20, 1972, with American diplomat William Stoltzfus, who was also accredited to other Persian Gulf states and resided in Kuwait at the time.

The Embassy of the United States in Abu Dhabi was established on June 24, 1974, with the first American Ambassador in residence Michael Edmund Sterner.

== See also ==
- Embassy of the United Arab Emirates, Washington, D.C.
- List of ambassadors of the United States to the United Arab Emirates
- United Arab Emirates–United States relations
