= Yousef Al Otaiba =

United Arab Emirates ambassador to the United States

- يوسف العتيبة
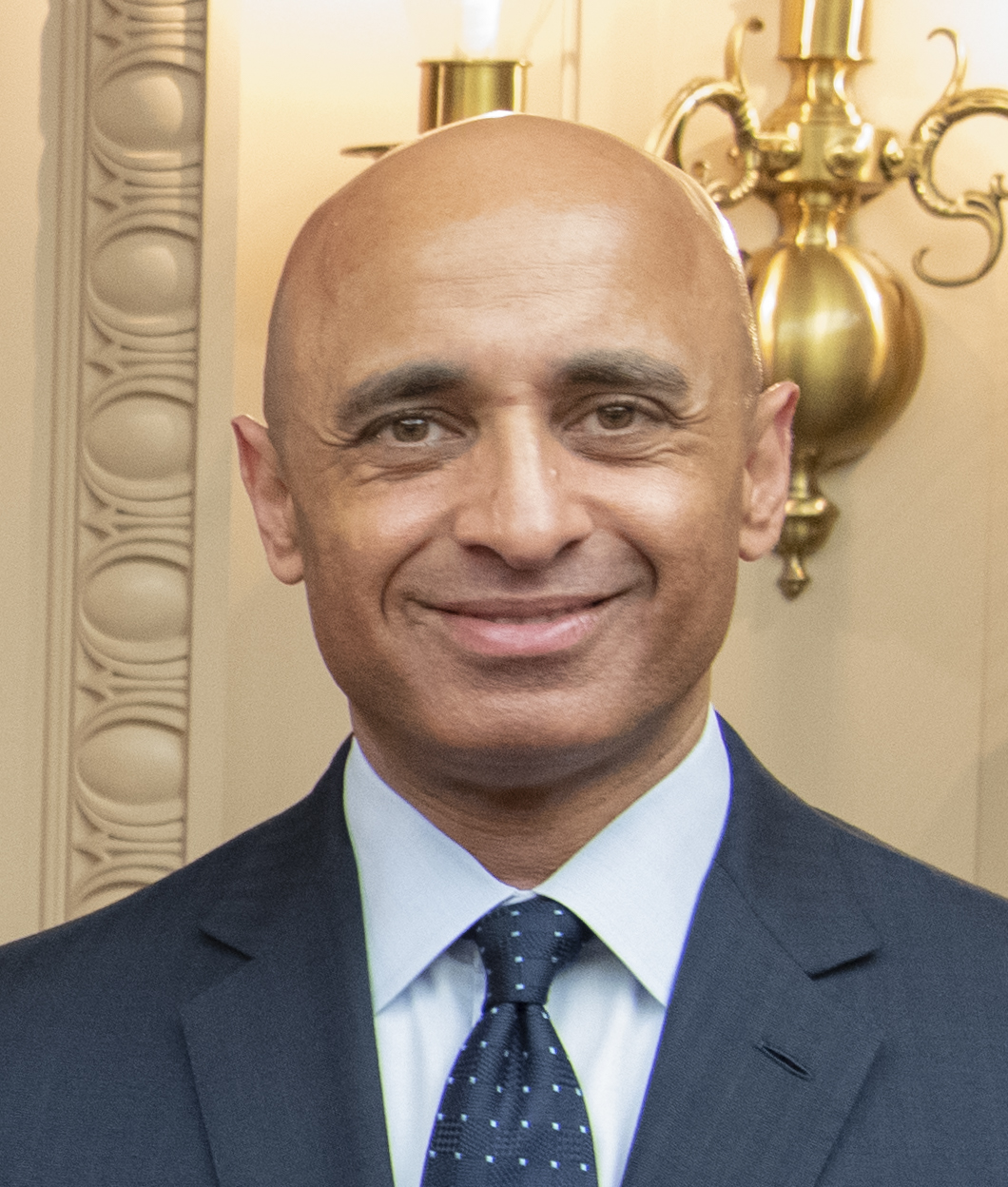
- Otaiba in 2020

UAE Ambassador to the United States
- Incumbent
- Assumed office 28 July 2008
- President: Mohammed bin Zayed Al Nahyan
- Preceded by: Saqr Ghobash

Personal details
- Born: 19 January 1974 (age 52) Cairo, Egypt
- Spouse: Abeer Al Otaiba
- Relations: Moza Saeed Al Otaiba (aunt), Hend Al Otaiba (sister)
- Children: Samia; Omar
- Parent: Mana Al Otaiba

Yousef Al Otaiba (Arabic: يوسف العتيبة) is the current United Arab Emirates ambassador to the United States and Minister of state. Previously Al Otaiba served as non-resident ambassador to Mexico. His father is Petroleum magnate Mana Al Otaiba, who served as the president of OPEC a record six times.

== Early life ==
Otaiba was born on 19 January 1974 in Cairo, Egypt. His father was the UAE's first Minister of Petroleum, Mana Saeed Al Otaiba, one of the country's key non-royal founding members as well as a close confidant to the late UAE founder and President Zayed bin Sultan Al Nahyan (1918–2004). His father had at least 12 children with 4 wives, including Otaiba's Egyptian mother. Otaiba was raised in Cairo by his mother, from whom he is the only child. He went to Cairo American College, a pre-K–12 international American school, and, while there, introduced himself to Frank G. Wisner, then the US ambassador to Egypt.

After completing high school in 1991, Al Otaiba studied international relations at Georgetown University, Washington, D.C. Up until December 2020, the UAE embassy in Washington claimed that Otaiba obtained a degree in international relations from Georgetown University. However, in 2017, The Intercept reported a claim from Georgetown University's office of the registrar that he never in fact graduated.

After attending Georgetown, Otaiba spent the next three years working for the automotive division of his family's firm, the Al Otaiba Group. His father's firm lost the General Motors/Cadillac agency in Abu Dhabi after a bitter 11-year dispute over non-performance. Otaiba was then selected to attend the International Fellow at the Industrial College of the Armed Forces (ICAF) at the National Defense University in Washington, in preparation for an assignment to join the immediate staff of then UAE Armed Forces Chief of Staff Mohammed bin Zayed Al Nahyan, a position he assumed upon graduating from ICAF in 2000. The former CENTCOM Commander, General Anthony Zinni was another of Otaiba's mentors.

Otaiba and his wife, Abeer, founder of a luxury fashion company, have one son, Omar, and one daughter, Samia.

== Government career ==
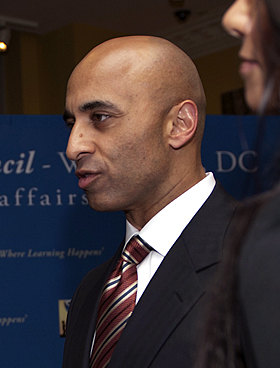
Otaiba in 2013

=== Advisor and liaison to Mohammed Bin Zayed Al Nahyan ===
At age 26, Otaiba became senior adviser to Mohammed bin Zayed Al Nahyan and, until his new posting, as director of international affairs for the court of the crown prince, he also served as the country's principal security, anti-terrorism and defence liaison with other governments. Bin Zayed was deputy supreme commander of the UAE Armed Forces, so in effect Otaiba worked for the UAE's defense minister for eight years.

In 2006 and 2007 Otaiba's role was described by Kristofer Harrison, a Defense and State Department advisor during the George W. Bush administration who worked closely with Otaiba, as "crucial helping to talk other countries in the region into backing President George W. Bush's troop surge in the Iraq War" - a role that was confirmed by Senate Intelligence Committee Chairman Richard Burr. Otaiba's most significant contribution was "persuading other Gulfies to support the political components of the surge (e.g. the Anbar Awakening), and helping 'translate' the general strategy into something they would support".

=== Ambassador to the United States ===
On 22 June 2008 Otaiba was elevated to UAE ambassador to the United States. He succeeded Saqr Ghobash, who had served as ambassador since March 2006. Upon his arriving in the capital, Otaiba hired Amy Little-Thomas, a former State Department staffer in the Bush administration, who became the UAE embassy's chief of protocol and created the nonprofit Oasis Foundation, his private foundation in connection with his work as ambassador "to advance positive relations between the UAE, a significant American ally (particularly in the Middle East), and the United States.” In 2016, a court ordered one of Oasis Foundation's board members to pay restitution for funds taken from the charity for personal expenditures - funds originally deposited and subsequently replenished by Otaiba. Otaiba worked closely with Howard Berman, then the Democratic chair of the House Foreign Affairs Committee, on an agreement that would allow the UAE to obtain nuclear materials from the US for a civilian program.

In July 2010, remarks made by Otaiba were interpreted as supporting a United States military strike on nuclear reactors in Iran. Otaiba's remarks were reported to have been the standard position of many Arab states.

==== Yemeni Civil War ====
From 2015 onwards Otaiba was a leading voice in Washington for the War in Yemen, where the UAE operated torture warehouses and funded death squads. The conflict has left more than 10,000 dead, millions starving (Famine in Yemen) and a cholera epidemic of historic proportions. Otaiba yelled at Representative Ro Khanna over his efforts to end US involvement in the Yemeni Civil War.

==== Links with Jared Kushner ====
In the run-up to President Trump's Riyadh Summit with Islamic leaders on 20–21 May 2017 strong bonds reportedly formed between Otaiba and President Trump's advisor and son-in-law Jared Kushner and the Crown Prince of Saudi Arabia and minister of defense Mohammed bin Salman in Saudi Arabia. Otaiba and Kushner first met June 2017 at the behest of Thomas Barrack, a billionaire investor and Trump backer.

==== Assessments of ambassadorship ====
Otaiba is generally seen as being a successful ambassador for the UAE, as the country asserts itself more aggressively in the sphere of foreign policy. In November 2017 it was announced that he had been promoted to the rank of Minister, while remaining the ambassador to the United States.

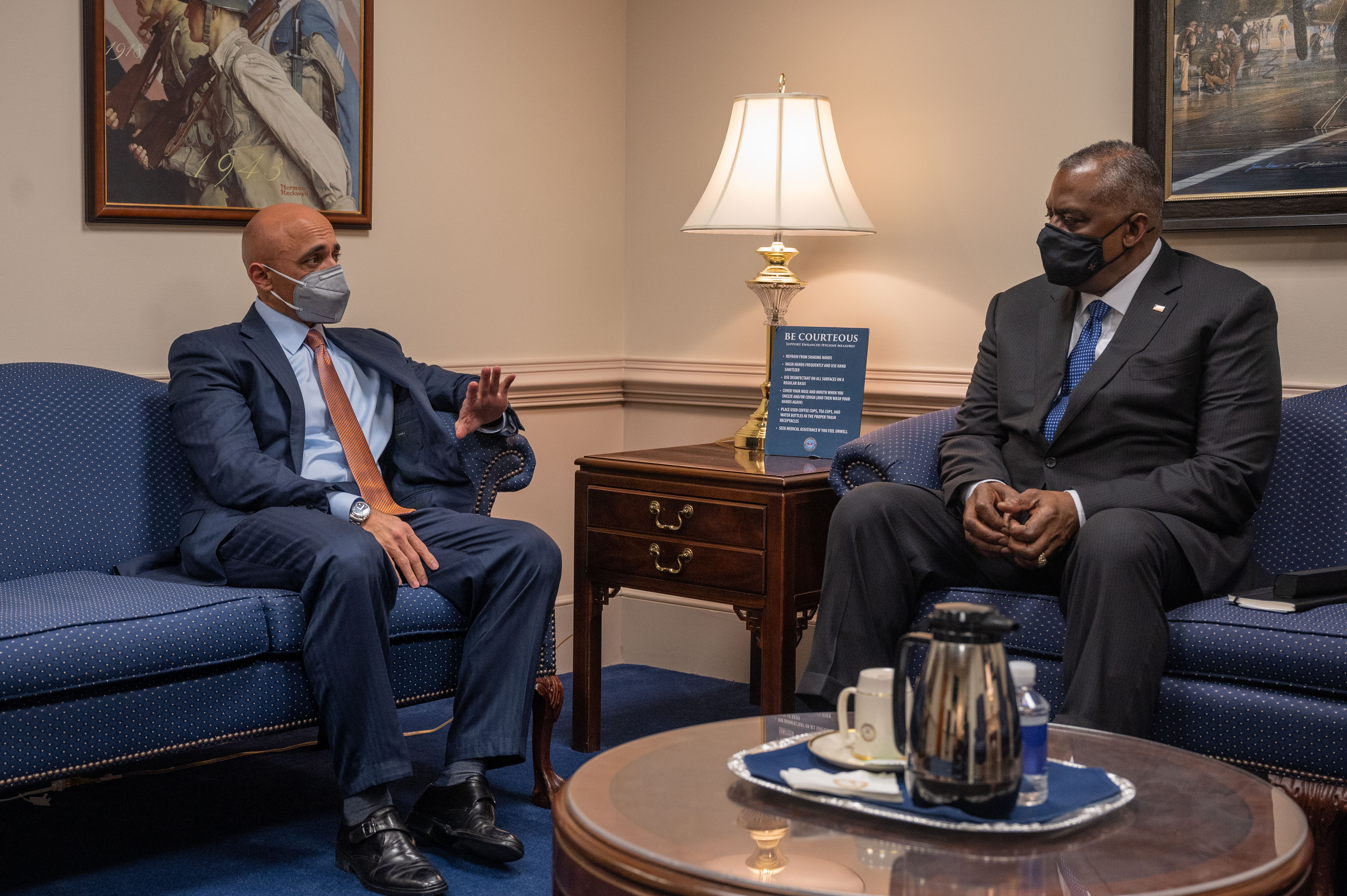
Otaiba (left) speaks to US Secretary of Defense Lloyd Austin in 2022

==== Abraham Accords ====
On 12 June 2020, Otaiba authored an op-ed in an effort to halt Israel's planned annexation of West Bank territory. Otaiba's op-ed was addressed to the Israeli public and published on the front page of the Yedioth Ahronoth. It was the first ever written by a Gulf diplomat and published in an Israeli newspaper. Prior to publication, Otaiba solicited the advice of Israeli-American Businessman, Haim Saban, on when and where to place the op-ed and was advised that the op-ed ought to be translated to Hebrew. In the op-ed, Otaiba expressed enthusiasm for stronger ties between Israel and UAE, touting the benefits of accelerated economic growth and stability throughout the Middle East in addition to security but said that Israeli plans for annexation and talk of normalization were a contradiction. He elaborated that annexation and seizure of Palestinian land would defy the “international consensus on the Palestinian right to self-determination”, warning that such a plan would “ignite violence and rouse extremists”. On 2 July 2020, Otaiba met with Avi Berkowitz to further discuss a plan to prevent annexation.

Along with a mutual interest in creating a unified front against the opposing forces of Iran, the concerns detailed in Otaiba's op-ed and planning with Berkowitz helped bring vested parties to the negotiating table to identify a better solution, ultimately resulting in a normalization agreement reached in August 2020 and officially committed to in September 2020 with the signing of the Abraham Accords on the South Lawn of the White House. The deal was brokered by the United States. Both Saban and Al Otaiba credited U.S. leadership for helping to manage the negotiation process and deliver on the agreements. “I think the United States government came through every single time,” Al Otaiba said. “And that's the reason we had the signing ceremony two weeks ago at the White House.” Otaiba also recognized Berkowitz, Jared Kushner and Brig. Gen. Miguel Correa for their efforts, whereas Correa became involved after playing a part in a 2017 U.S. coordinated rescue operation in Yemen that brought UAE soldiers and a member of the royal family to safety after their helicopter crashed. Otaiba said he spoke to them more than anyone else in the weeks leading up to the agreement and if it wasn't for them the deal probably wouldn't have been done - noting the amount of trust required. The 2020 deal marked the first time anyone had normalized ties with Israel since Jordan in 1994, opening the doors for others to follow suit. In August 2020, Otaiba issued a statement extolling the Israel–United Arab Emirates peace agreement as "a win for diplomacy and for the region", adding how it "lowers tensions and creates new energy for positive change".

==== Artificial intelligence investments ====
In July 2024, the United States House Select Committee on Strategic Competition between the United States and the Chinese Communist Party accused Al Otaiba of "personally intervening" to prevent it from meeting with representatives from G42 regarding U.S. national security concerns about the company's ties to China.

==== Israel-Palestine conflict ====
In February 2025, Donald Trump announced to “take over the Gaza Strip” and suggested to forcibly displace Palestinians, stating they should resettle into “far safer and more beautiful communities”. He said to own Gaza and take its responsibility, while relocating the Palestinians to Egypt and Jordan. Arab states, including Saudi Arabia, the United Arab Emirates, Qatar, Egypt and Jordan, united together to oppose Trump’s proposal and try block it. However, Yousef Al Otaiba expressed doubts about any alternate counter-proposal from Arab nations. Otaiba said the UAE was open to discuss the US’ Gaza plans and find common ground with the Trump administration, hinting an opposition to the Arab front against Trump’s proposal.

==== 2026 Iran war ====
In a 2026 article to The Wall Street Journal regarding the 2026 Iran war, Otaiba stated that the Iranian revolution that took place 50 years ago is still a threat to global security and economy stability. He rejected "a simple ceasefire" as "not enough" and called on the U.S. to achieve a "conclusive outcome" against Iran that addresses Iran's "full range of threats: nuclear capabilities, missiles, drones, terror proxies and blockades of international sea lanes."

== Controversies ==
=== GlobaLeaks ===
In early June 2017, an anonymous hacker group named GlobaLeaks began distributing emails to multiple news outlets that they had hacked from the inbox of Al Otaiba. According to The New York Times, the hacked emails appeared to benefit Qatar and be the work of hackers working for Qatar, a common subject of the distributed emails. One leaked email alleged that Otaiba loaned ex-Al Jazeera journalist and Otaiba's high school friend, Mohamed Fahmy, $250,000 to cover his legal fees in his $100 million lawsuit against Al Jazeera and Qatar. Another leaked email alleged that the UAE supported moving the US military base Al Udeid Air Base and the Taliban embassy out of Qatar. A third leaked email alleged that Otaiba hired Banque Havilland to draw up a plan on how to start a financial war against Qatar.

A selection of other emails were leaked relating to alleged UAE payments to U.S. lobbying firms, Otaiba finances tied to 1Malaysia Development Berhad, a $250,000 UAE invoice for information related to the exportation of military-grade drones, Otaiba's criticism of Saudi decision making, and an inside account of Otaiba's nightlife and relationship with women prior to becoming Ambassador. Roman Paschal, Otaiba's friend, confirmed no wrongdoing by Otaiba in an interview with The Intercept and the Daily Beast said the leaked emails fell short of the explosive revelations hinted at in GlobaLeaks's cover letter. Before disclosing the affiliation between Otaiba finances and 1Malaysia Development Berhad, Otaiba allegedly met with Jho Low, a Malaysian financier with whom he holds a long-standing friendship. In return for introductions and deals with Emirati delegates, Jho Low paid Otaiba a commission. GlobaLeaks stated that their intent behind the emails was to expose the UAE's efforts to manipulate the U.S. government, but denied allegiance to Qatar, or any other government mentioned in the emails. The leaked email exchanges received criticism in the media for potentially obstructing U.S. operations in the Middle East, regardless of their initial intent.

The emails received by The Intercept also revealed an impressive covert cooperation between the UAE and the Foundation for Defense of Democracies (FDD). Otaiba frequently exchanged friendly emails with the FDD Senior Counselor John Hannah. The emails also listed a proposed agenda, including an extensive discussion on Qatar, of meeting between the UAE and FDD for June 11–14. The email leaks also revealed close contacts between the UAE and US-based think tanks, including the United Against Nuclear Iran (UANI) and the Counter Extremism Project (CEP). Apart from Otaiba and the staff of both the groups, the network involved the UAE lobbyists and a Saudi lobbyist. The emails led to questions about funding of these groups by the UAE, which has funded other American think tanks.

=== Reputation management ===
In May 2026, The New York Times reported that Otaiba hired reputation management firm Terakeet, which worked to improve his public image over the course of several years beginning in 2019. The United Arab Emirates paid more than $6 million for these services. Terakeet managed his online presence, and used a sockpuppet account to make edits to Taiba's Wikipedia page, (Note: In 2021, Wikipedia reversed the edits, and suspended the offending account, Quorum816.) in order to remove damaging content, first published by The Intercept, about alleged past connections to sex workers and sex traffickers.

== See also ==
- Embassy of the United Arab Emirates, Washington, D.C.
- United Arab Emirates–United States relations
