= Webster University Thailand =

Webster University (Thailand)
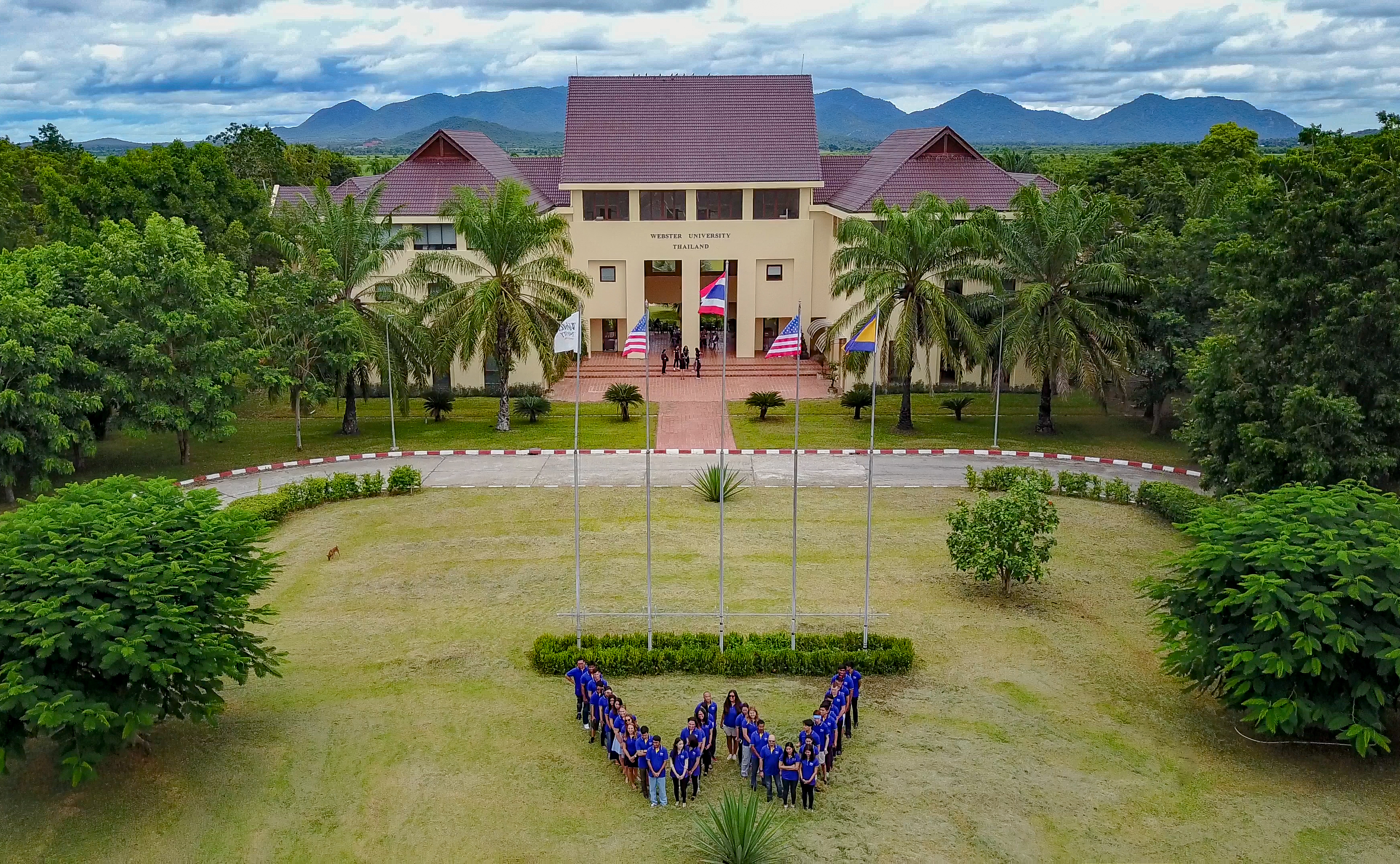
- Main campus in Cha-am (2017)
- Type: Private, four-year
- Active: 1999–December 2021; 4 years ago
- President: Elizabeth (Beth) J. Stroble
- Location: Cha-am and Bangkok, Thailand; 12.657058°N 99.851288°E
- Campus: Rural and urban
- Colors: Navy, gold, and white
- Nickname: Webster, WUT
- Mascot: Gorlok
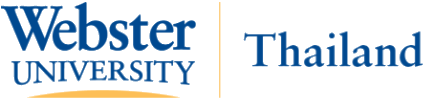

Webster University Thailand (WUT) was an international campus of Webster University from Webster Groves, Missouri, US. The US-based non-profit university established its international campus in Thailand in 1999 with an undergraduate campus near the resort town of Hua Hin in the district of Cha-am, and additional graduate and undergraduate programs in Bangkok, Thailand. The facility in Thailand is one of several international campuses associated with Webster University. The campus officially closed on December 31, 2021.

== Undergraduate programs ==
Webster University Thailand offers undergraduate degrees in:

- BA International Relations
- BA Management (General)
- BA Management: Emphasis in Human Resources Management
- BA Management: Emphasis in International Business
- BA Management: Emphasis in Marketing
- BA Psychology
- BS Business Administration
- BS Computer Science

== Graduate programs ==
The university offers following graduate programs:

- Master of Business Administration (MBA)
- MA International Relations
- MA Teaching English as a Second Language (TESL)

== Bangkok Academic Center ==
In addition to the main campus in Cha-am, the university has offices and classroom facilities at the Bangkok Academic Center on the 4th floor of the EM Space of Empire Tower in Bangkok's business district, Sathorn. Master's degree (MBA, MA International Relations and MA TESL) and undergraduate programs available at the Bangkok location include Computer Science (BS), Management (BA) with an emphasis in international business and English as a second language (ESL).

== Faculty ==
The university's teaching faculty, research professors, and adjunct professors come from over 60 nations across the globe.

== Webster worldwide ==
Webster University in Thailand is part of the Webster University worldwide network of international campuses, students enrolled at the campus in Thailand have the option to study at any of the Webster campuses including the US, the United Kingdom, Switzerland, Netherlands, Austria, China, and Ghana.

The university has partnerships with universities worldwide including:

- Haute École de Bruxelles, through the Institut Supérieur de Traducteurs & Interprètes, Brussels, Belgium,
- Beijing Language and Culture University, China,
- Trier University (Universitat Trier), Germany,
- Webster-Florence at Kent State University-Florence, Italy,
- Obirin University, Tokyo, Japan,
- Kansai University, Osaka, Japan,
- International Horizons College (IHC), Dubai, UAE,
- The Universidad Autónoma de Guadalajara, Mexico,
- Oviedo or Uviéu (in Asturian), Spain

== Accreditation and awards ==
Webster University is accredited by the Higher Learning Commission, which covers the university campus in Thailand. In addition, the campus in Thailand is accredited locally by Office of the Higher Education Commission Thailand (CHE). Webster University's School of Business and Technology is accredited by the Accreditation Council for Business Schools & Programs (ACBSP). In 2013, the Webster University Thailand campus was awarded the "Prime Minister's Business Excellence Award" and earned an "excellent" rating from Thailand's Office of National Education Standards and Quality Assessment.
