= Leslie Fossel =

American politician

Member of the Maine House of Representatives from the 53rd district
- In office 2008–2012

Personal details
- Party: Republican

Leslie Fossel is an American Republican politician who represented District 53 in the Maine House of Representatives from 2008 to 2012.

In 2020, he ran for Alna selectman.
