= Embassy of the United Arab Emirates, Washington, D.C. =

Embassy of the United Arab Emirates in Washington, D.C.
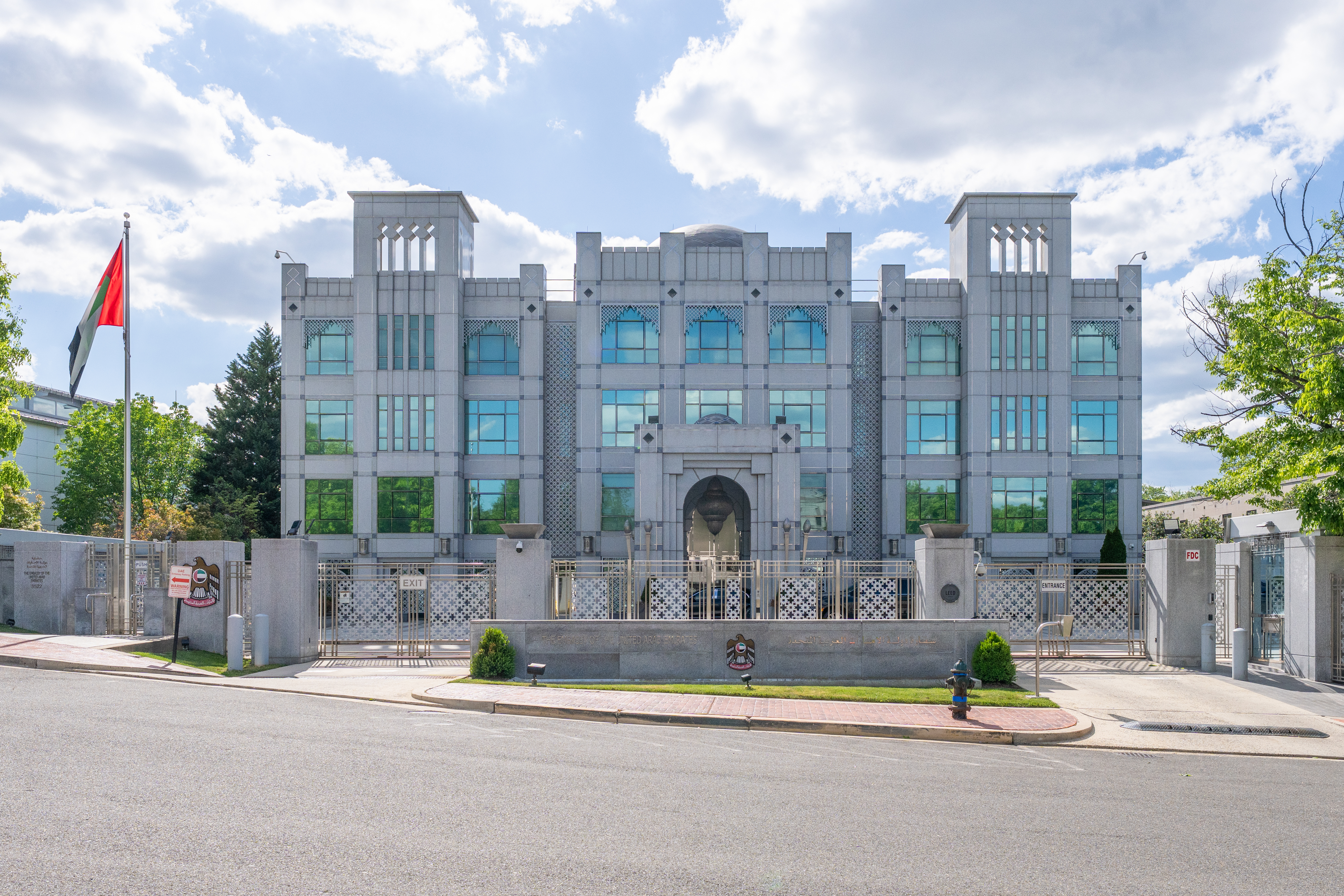
- Location: Washington, D.C.
- Address: 3522 International Court, N.W.
- Coordinates: 38°56′42″N 77°4′9″W
- Ambassador: Yousef Al Otaiba (since July 2008)
- Website: www.uae-embassy.org

The Embassy of the United Arab Emirates in Washington, D.C. is the diplomatic mission of the United Arab Emirates to the United States. It is located at 3522 International Court, Northwest, Washington, D.C., in the North Cleveland Park neighborhood.

The current ambassador is Yousef Al Otaiba.
