= Wat Khao Bandai It =

Thai Buddhist temple

- วัดเขาบันไดอิฐ
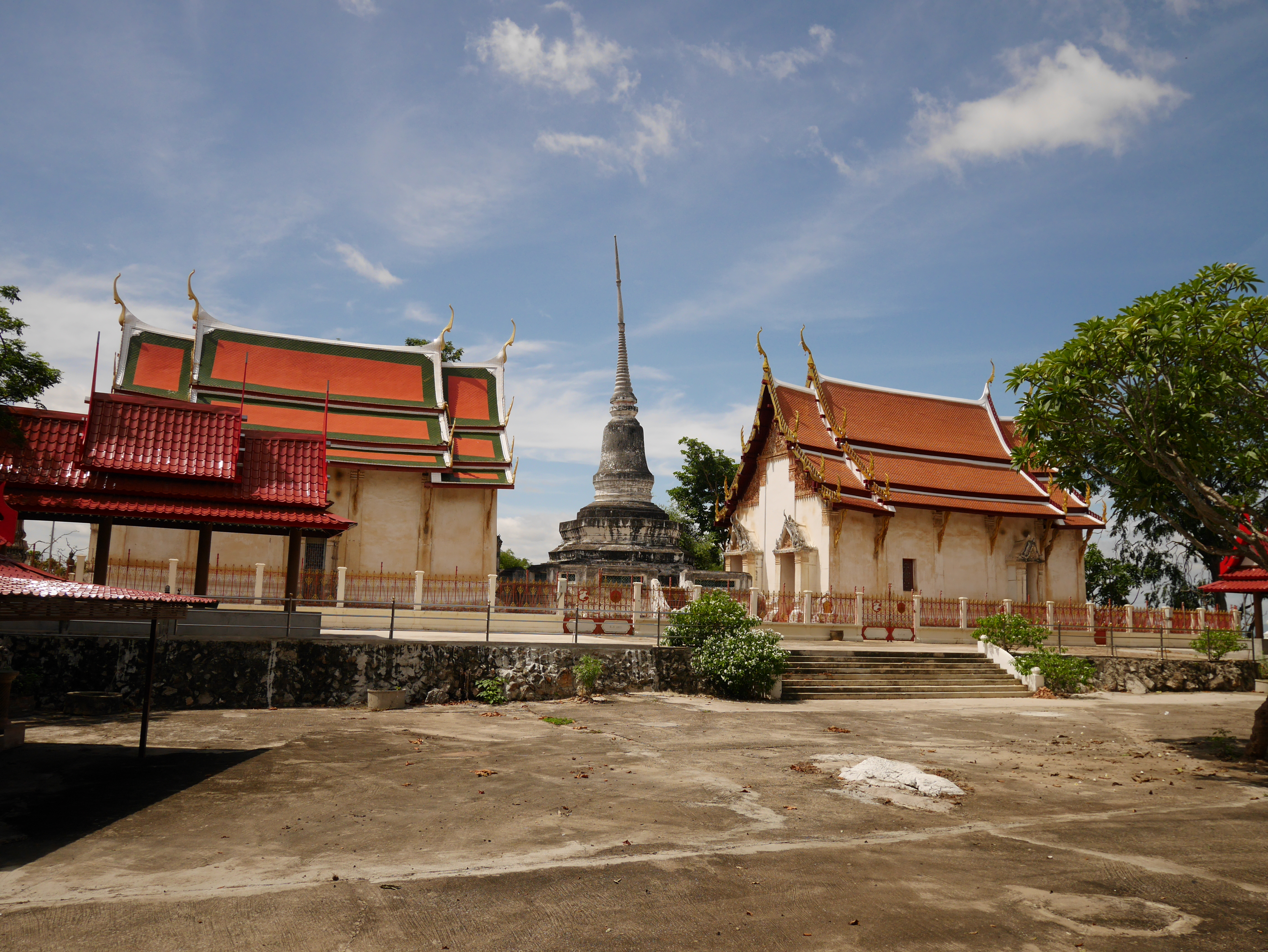
- Pair of ordination halls and leaning pagoda

- Location within Thailand

Religion
- Affiliation: Buddhism
- Sect: Theravāda Mahā Nikāya
- Status: Civilian temple

Location
- Location: Bandai It Rd, Rai Som, Mueang Phetchaburi district, Phetchaburi
- Country: Thailand
- Coordinates: 13.09773°N 99.95066°E

Wat Khao Bandai It is an ancient temple in Phetchaburi province, western Thailand. It is one of the most famous temples in Phetchaburi, with its history dating back to the Sukhothai or Ayutthaya period. The temple is located within the "Khao Bandai It" (temple of brick stair mountain) area, southwest of Phra Nakhon KhiriPhra Nakhon Khiri (also known as Khao Wang). Khao Bandai is a small hill with a height of and the way is built on the top of the hill. In the Ayutthaya period, such as Wat Khao Bandai It, was the place where Prince Si Silp (heir of King Songtham) was imprisoned for treason against King Chetthathirat. Some legends say that Wat Khao Bandai It used to be a place of meditation for old Brahmin Saeng, who was the pedagogue of King Suriyenthrathibodi (Tiger King). Brahmin Saeng was said to be an expert in alchemy and magic. Whenever the soldiers of Phetchaburi went to battle, they came to ask for sacred objects such as talismans or takrut (a type of Thai sacred object).

It has several caves such as Tham Pratham, Tham Phra Chao Suea, Tham Phra Phuttha Saiyat, and Tham Duke. The pair of ordination halls on the west side of the mountaintop have a leaning pagoda in the middle. According to legend, a rich man with two wives donated money to renovate the temple and build a pagoda in which his ashes were enshrined after he died. Later, the two wives argued over who he had loved more. They built a pair of ordination halls next to the pagoda and prayed that if the pagoda would lean towards the hall of the wife he loved more. The pagoda leans towards the eastern ordination hall, which was built by the mistress.

Wat Bandai It is located in the midst of a natural enclave on the outskirts of Phetchaburi town. It is a habitat for wild monkeys.

== Gallery ==
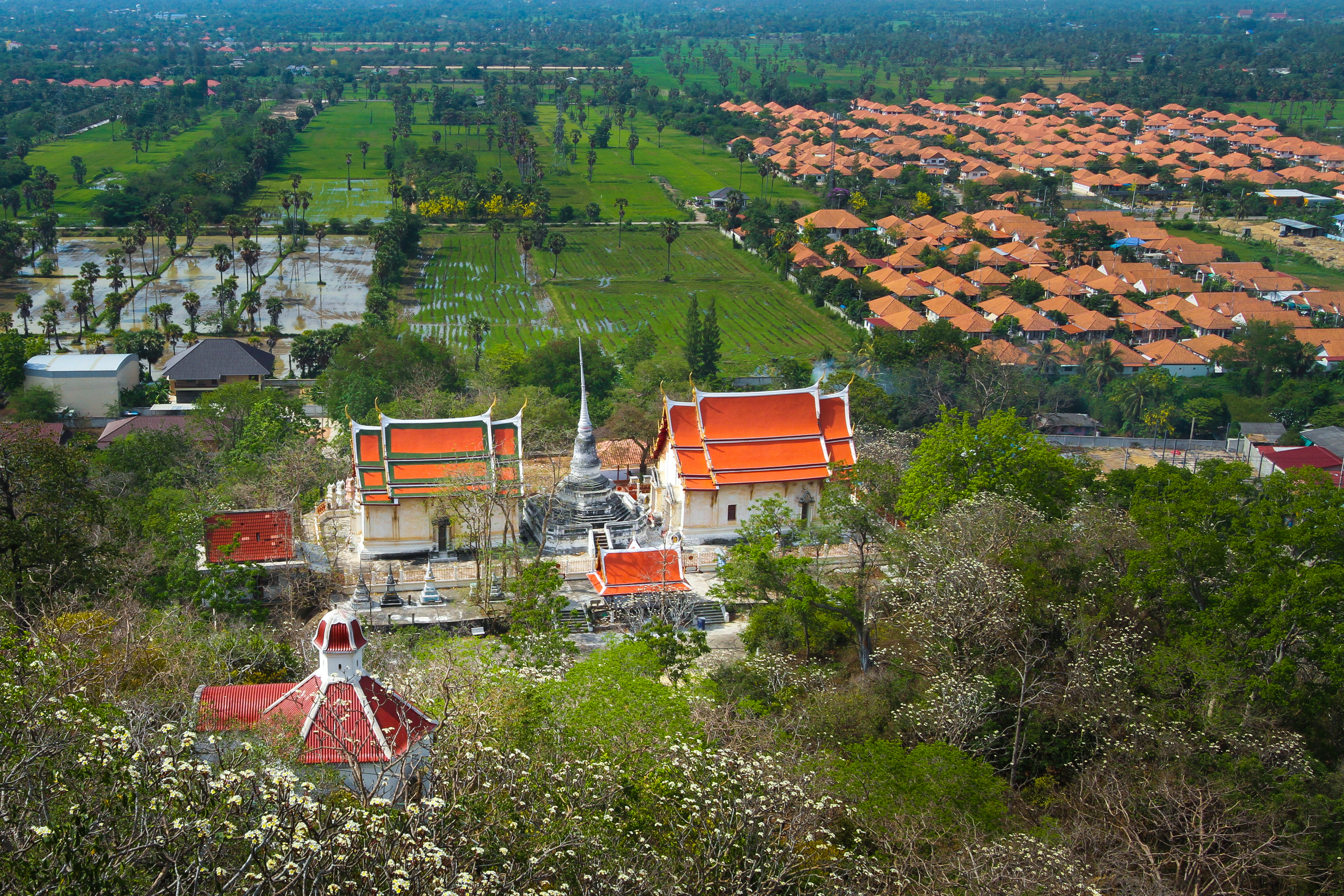

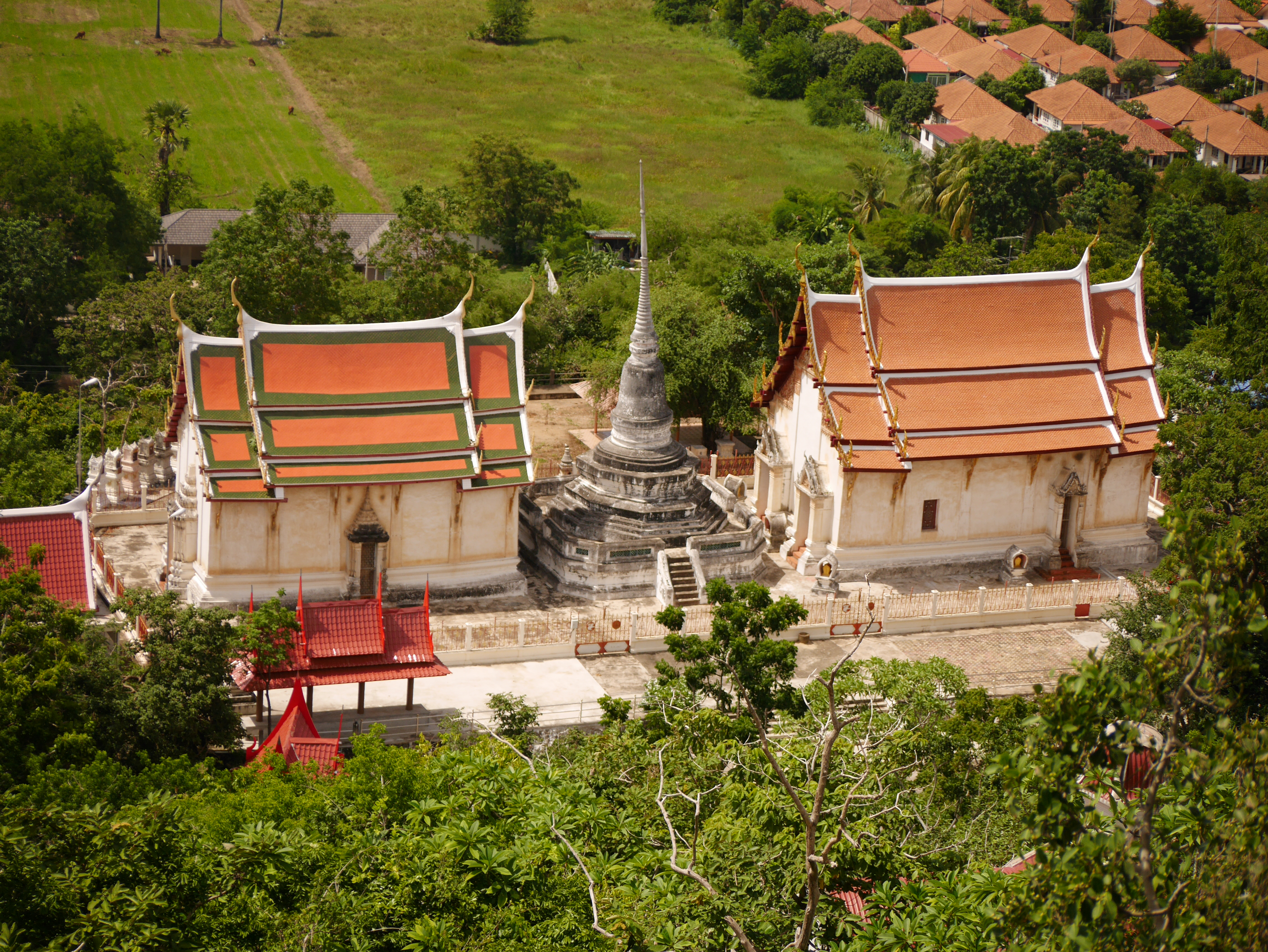

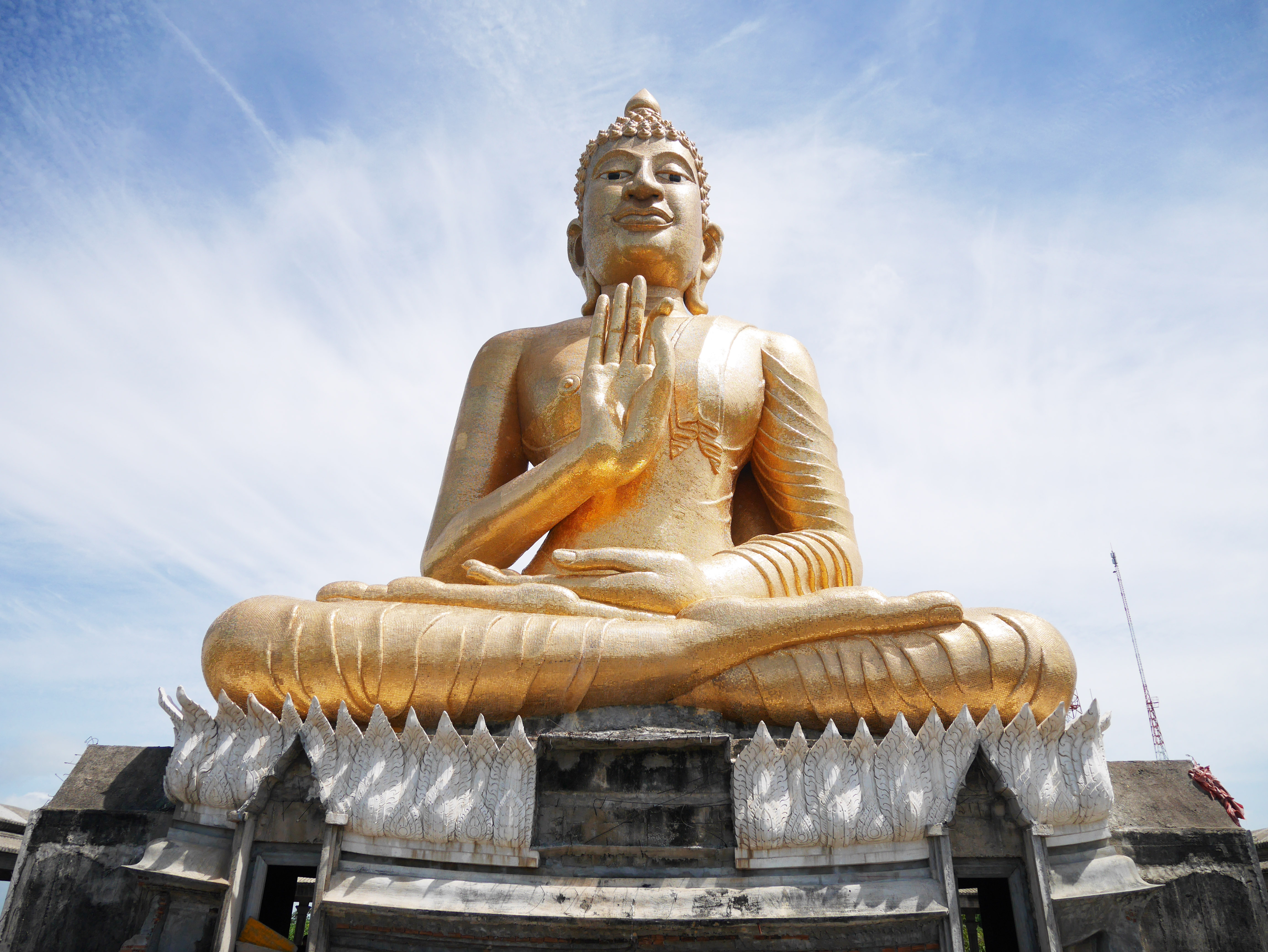

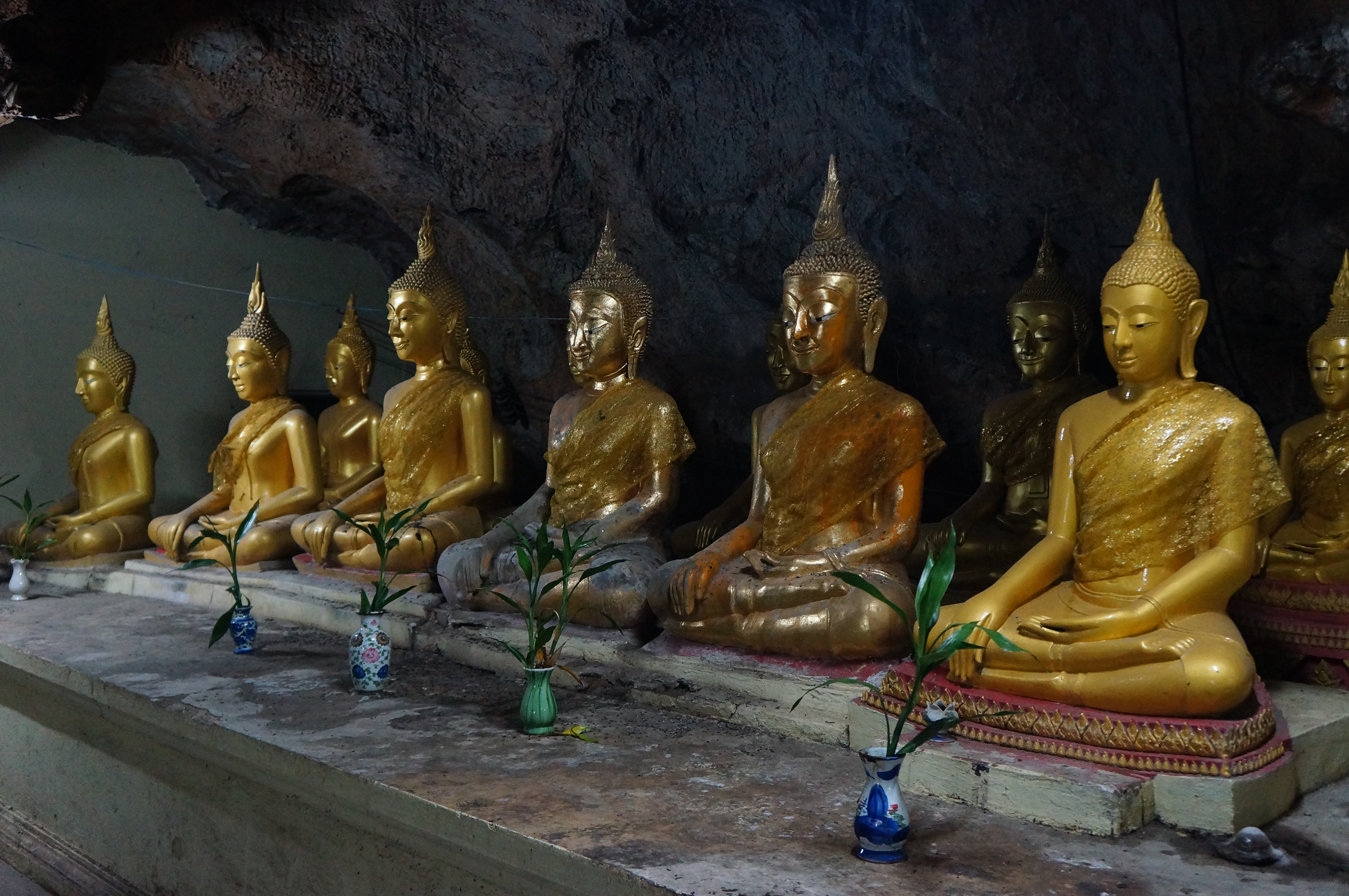

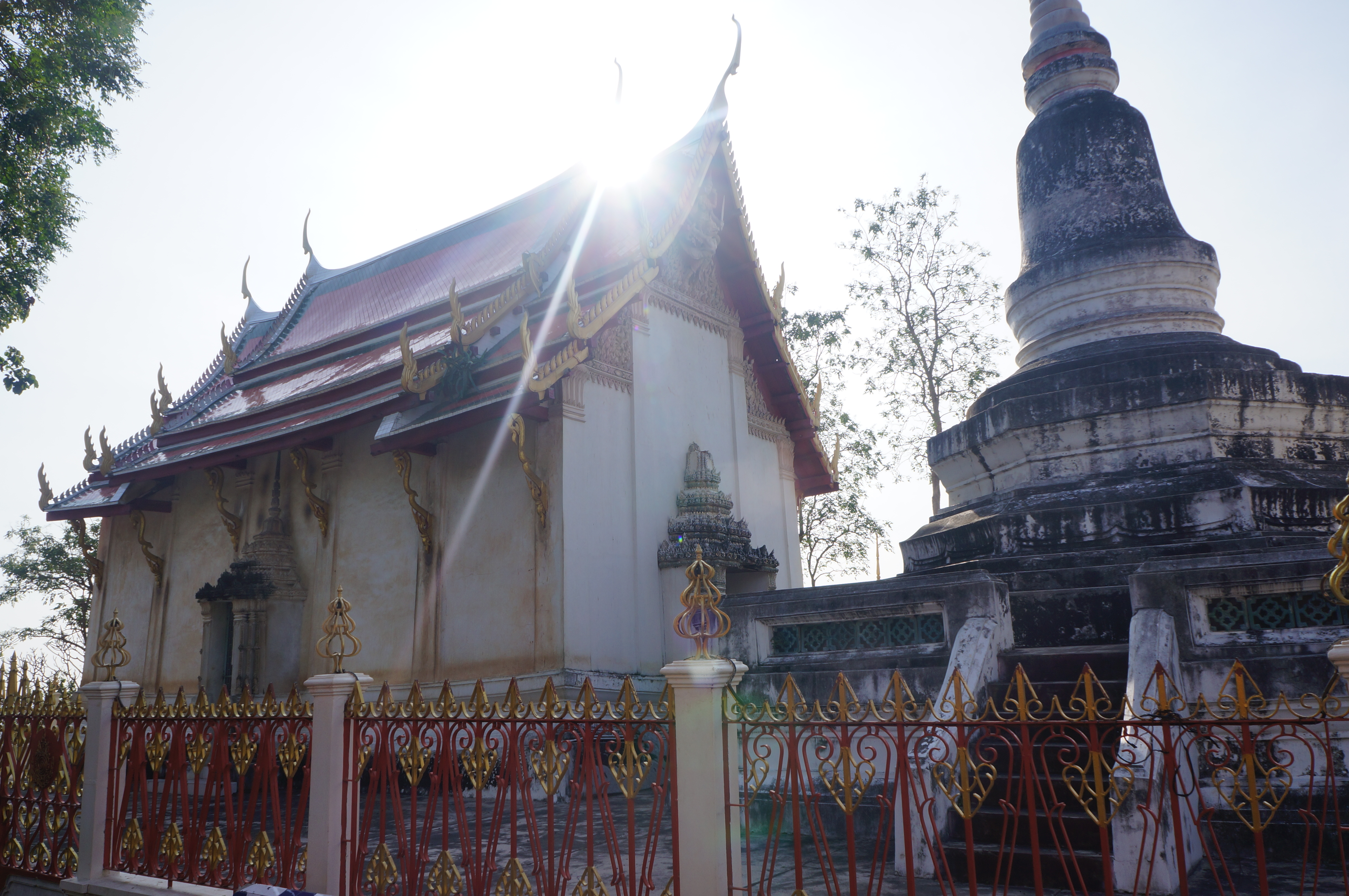

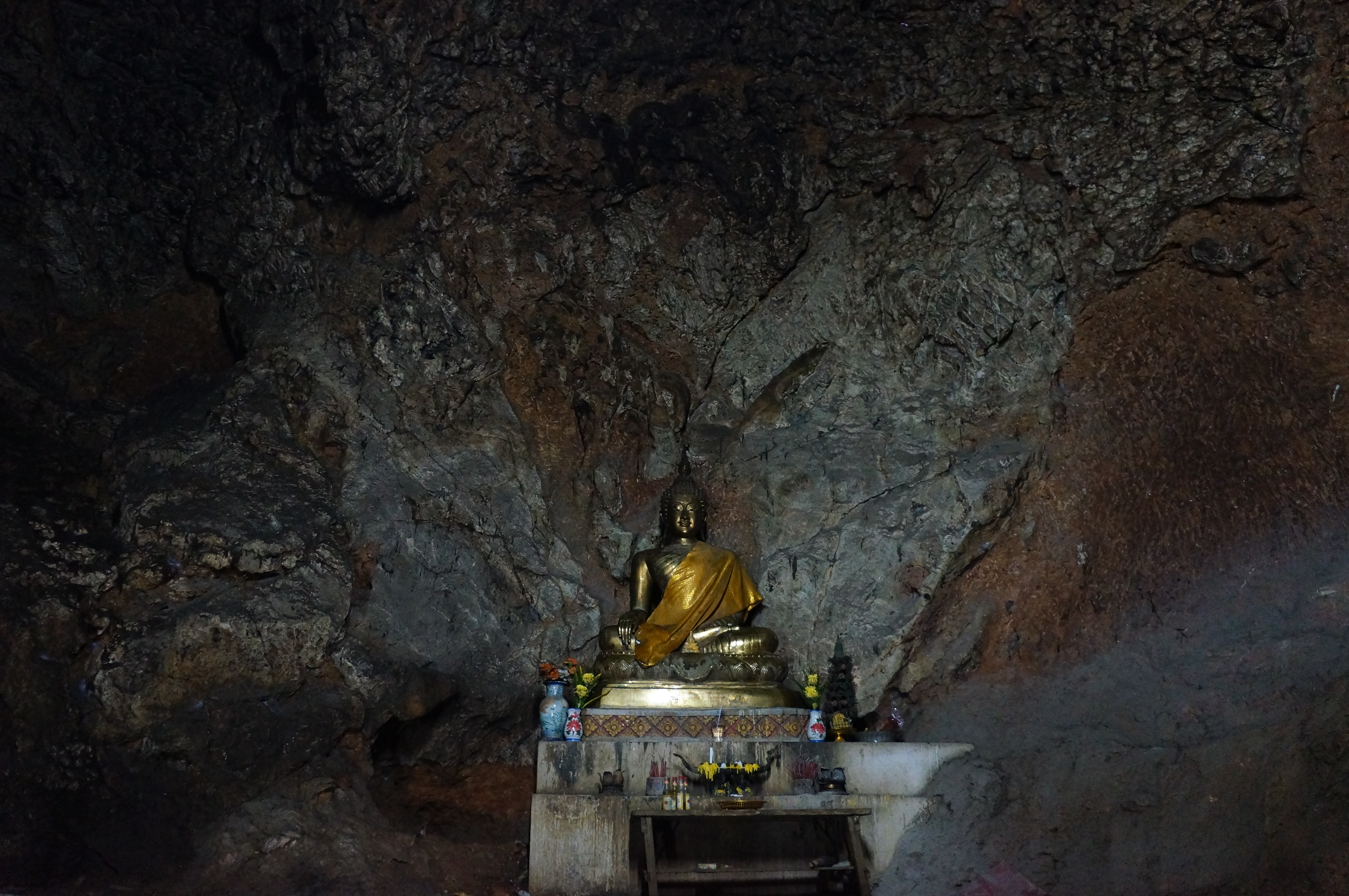
