= Phetchaburi province =

Province of Thailand

Coordinates: 13°6′38″N 99°56′47″E

Phetchaburi เพชรบุรี
- Province
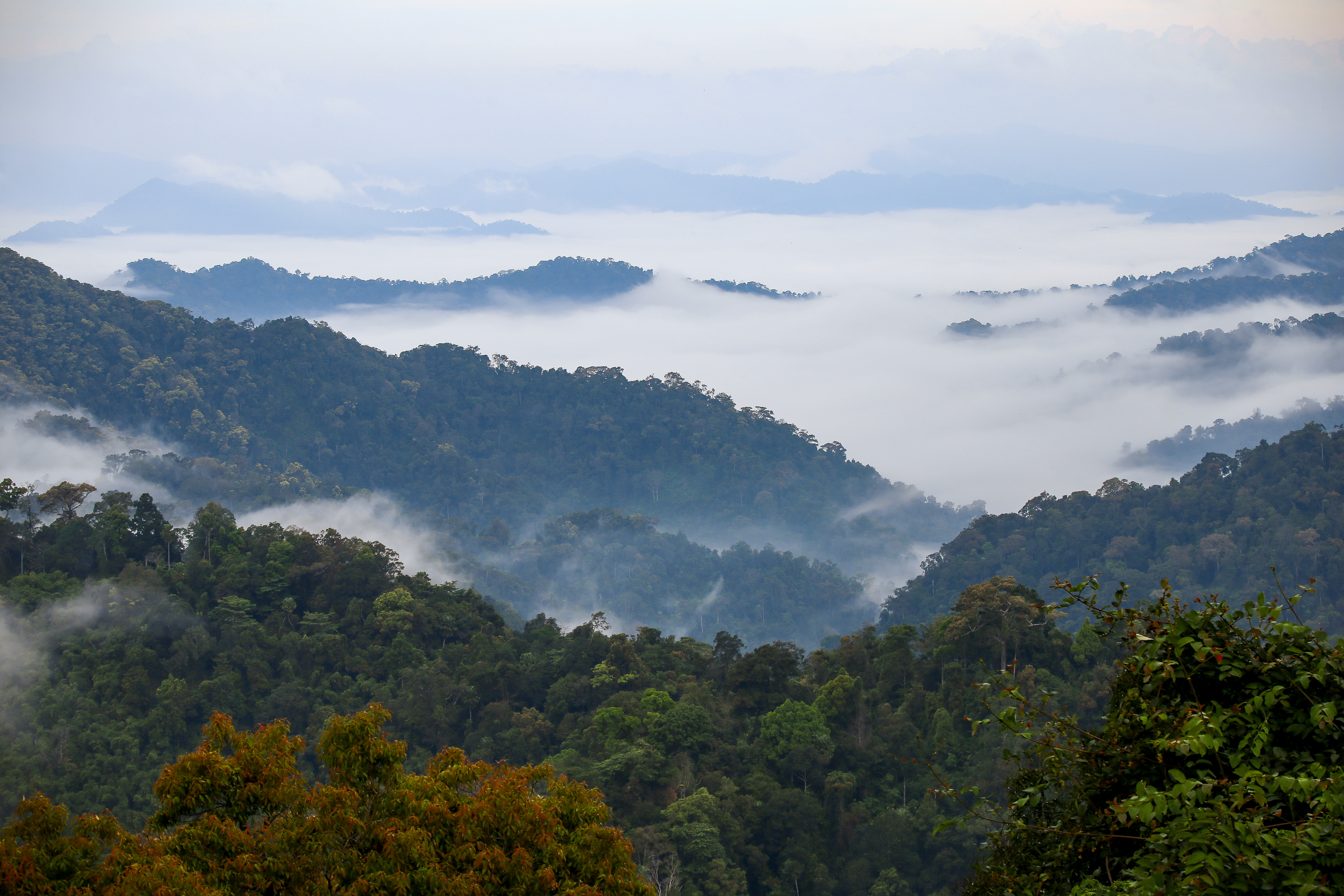
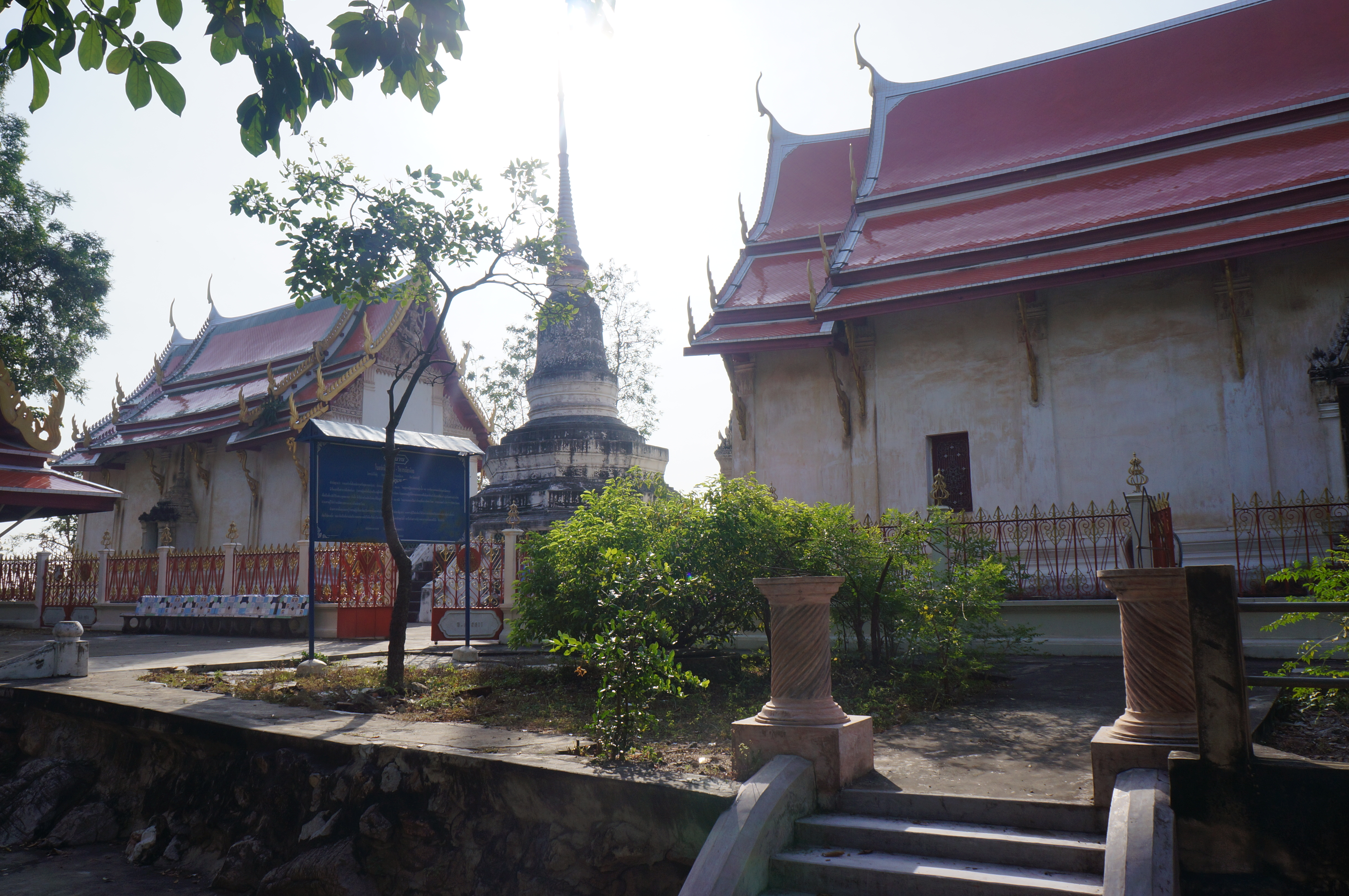
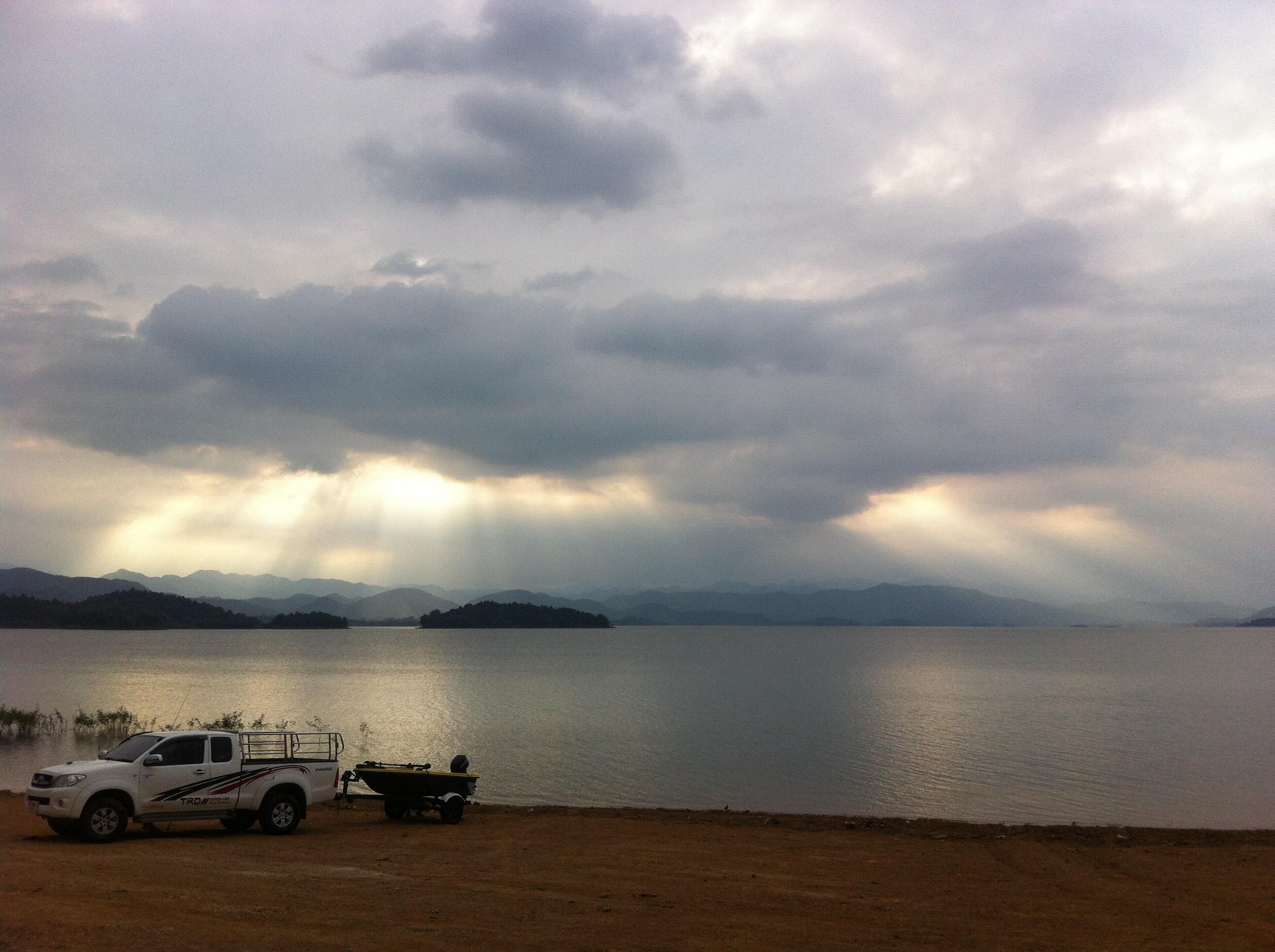
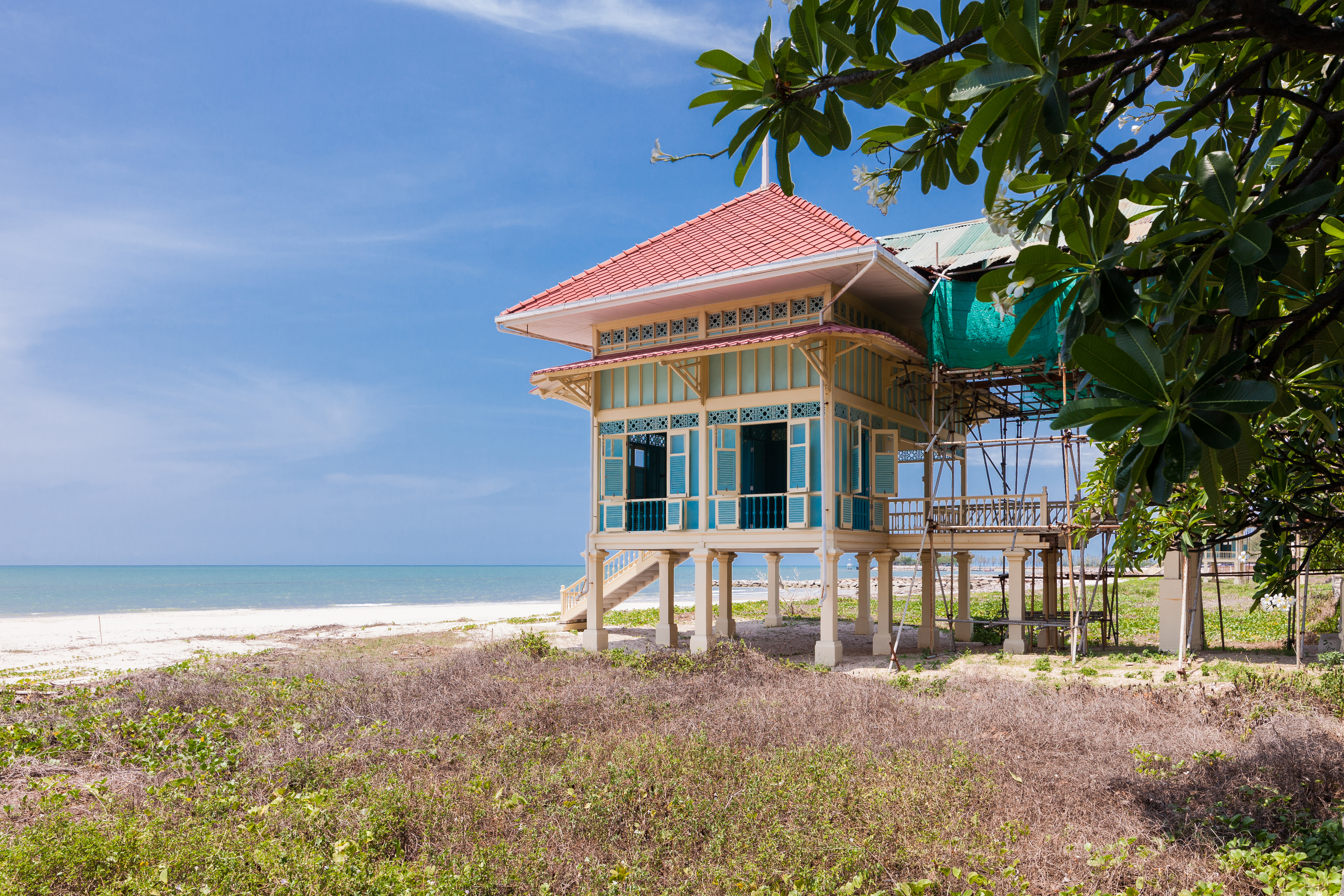
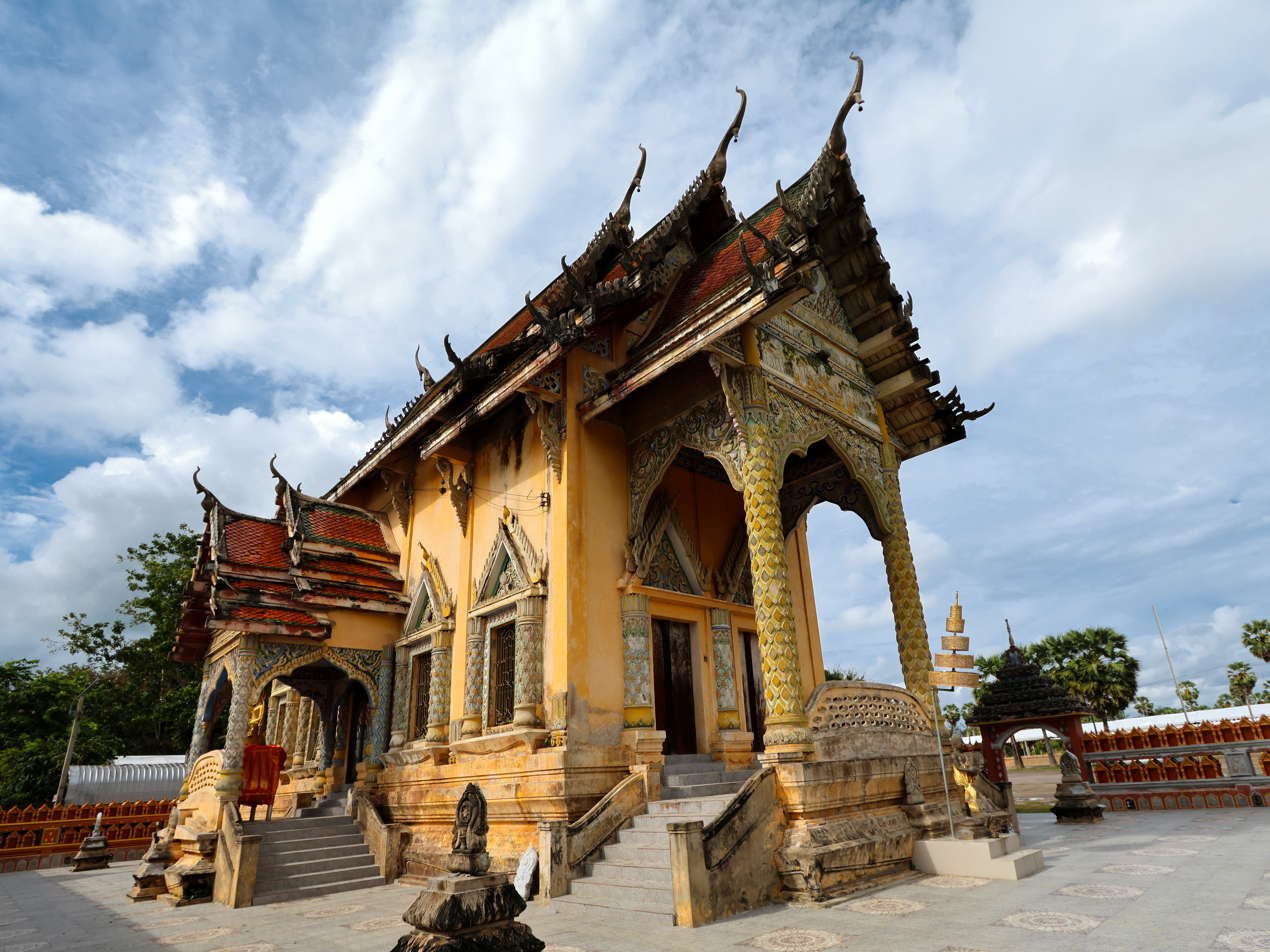
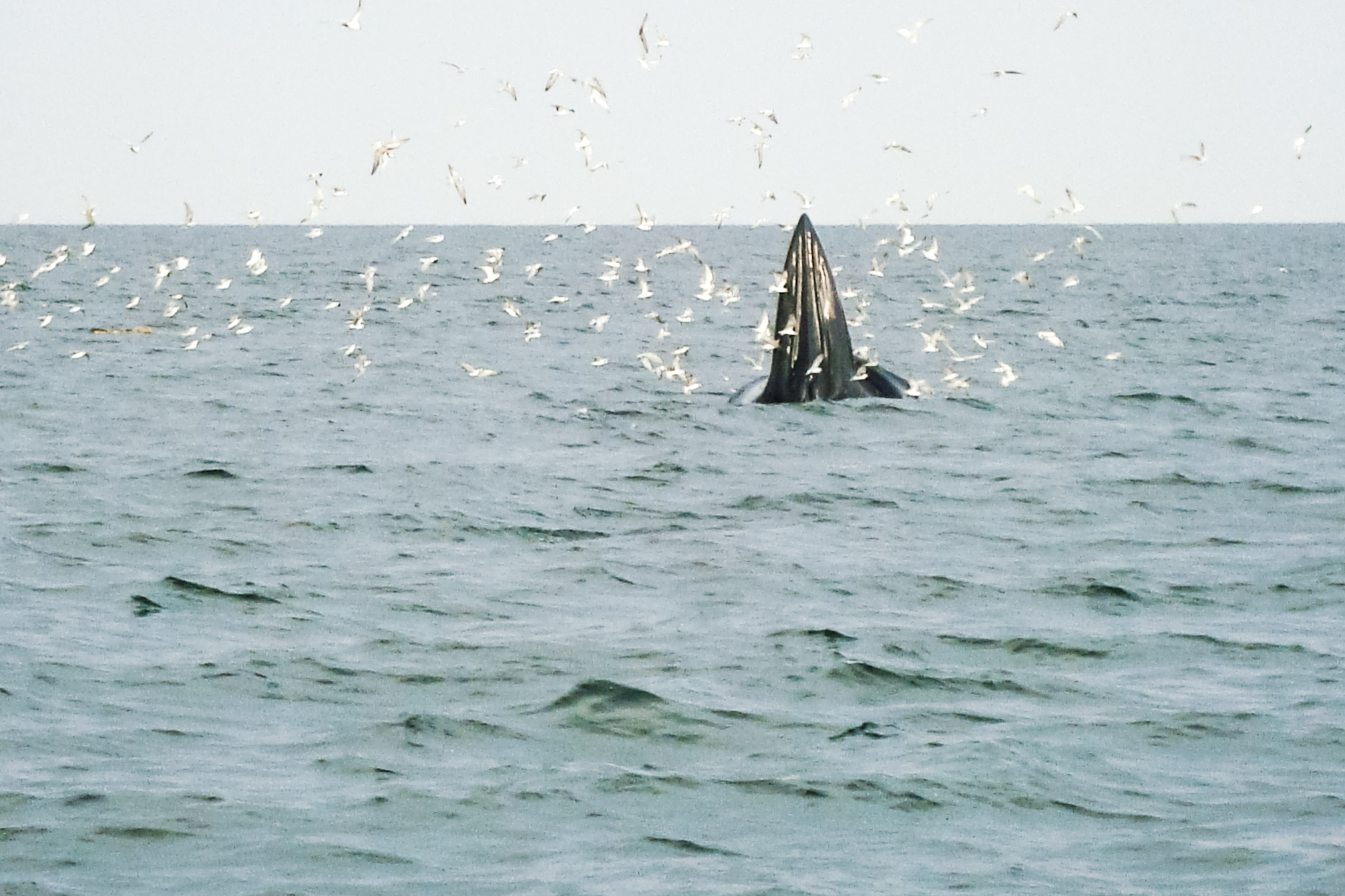
- From left to right, top to bottom: Khao Phanoen Thung, viewpoint of Kaeng Krachan National Park; Wat Khao Bandai It; Kaeng Krachan Reservoir, the origin of the Phetchaburi River; Mrigadayavan Palace; Wat Tham Rong; Bryde's whale in Ao Bang Tabun

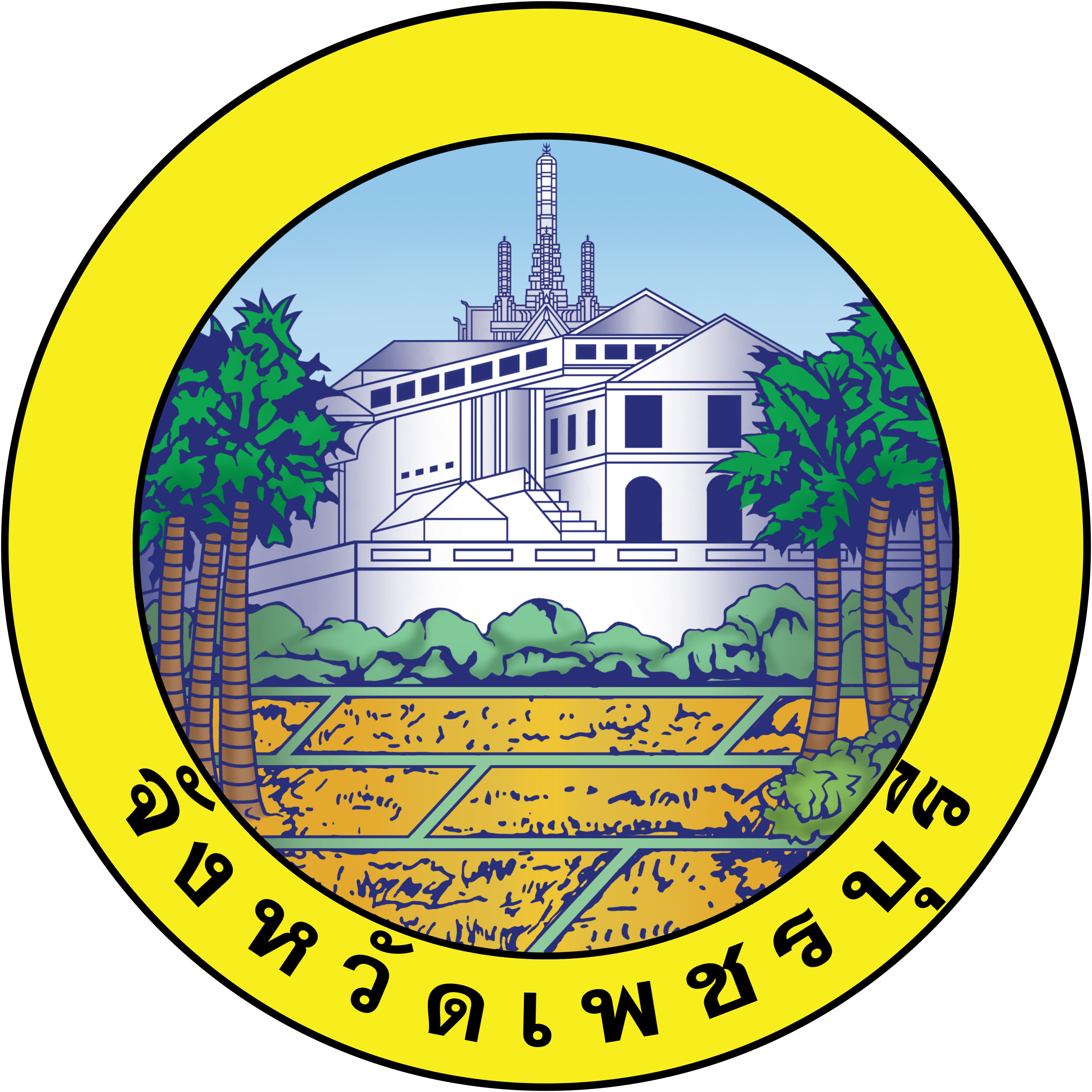
- Flag Seal
- Nickname: Mueang Phet (Thai: เมืองเพชร)
- Mottoes: เขาวังคู่บ้าน ขนมหวานเมืองพระ เลิศล้ำศิลปะ แดนธรรมะ ทะเลงาม ("Home of Khao Wang. Desserts of the Buddhist town. Excellent fine arts. Land of Dharma. Beautiful seas.")
- Map of Thailand highlighting Phetchaburi province
- Country: Thailand
- Capital: Phetchaburi

Government
  - Governor: Popchanok Chalanukro

Area
  - Total: 6,172 km^{2} (2,383 sq mi)
  - Rank: 36th

Population (2024)
  - Total: ▲484,145
  - Rank: 56th
  - Density: 78/km^{2} (200/sq mi)
  - Rank: 64th

Human Achievement Index (HAI)
  - HAI (2022): 0.6733 "high" Ranked 4th

GDP
  - Total: baht 68 billion (US$2.3 billion) (2019)
- Time zone: UTC+7 (ICT)
- Postal code: 76xxx
- Calling code: 032
- ISO 3166 code: TH-76
- Website: phetchaburi.go.th

Phetchaburi Provincial Administrative Organization องค์การบริหารส่วนจังหวัดเพชรบุรี
- Provincial Administrative Organization
- Interactive map of Phetchaburi Provincial Administrative Organization

Government
  - Type: Local administrative divisions
  - Body: Phetchaburi Provincial Administrative Organization
  - President: Chaiya Angkinan
- Website: phetchaburipao.go.th

Phetchaburi (Thai: เพชรบุรี, pronounced [pʰét.tɕʰā.bū.rīː]) or Phet Buri (pronounced [pʰét bū.rīː]) is one of the western or central provinces (changwat) of Thailand. It lies at the north end of the Malay Peninsula, between the Gulf of Thailand and the Tanaosi range on the Myanmar border. Neighbouring provinces are Ratchaburi, Samut Songkhram and Prachuap Khiri Khan. Kaeng Krachan National Park, the largest in Thailand, covers nearly half of the province, and the shore at Pak Thale is a wintering ground for large numbers of migrant waterbirds.

The provincial town was a port in the Dvaravati period and was re-established in the 12th century as Phrip Phri, a polity on the west coast of the Bay of Bangkok. It became part of the Ayutthaya kingdom in 1351 and served as a fortified frontier town. Three later kings built summer palaces there.

The province produces salt and palm sugar, and tourism matters to its economy, although it has fallen in the national visitor rankings as coastal erosion has damaged the shore at Cha-am. It has a distinctive artistic style known as the "Phet School", and is known for banana stalk carving, lacquerware and the coconut custard khanom mo kaeng.

== Etymology ==
Phetchaburi means "city of diamonds", buri means "city" in Sanskrit language.

== History ==
Phetchaburi, earlier known as the Phrip Phri (Thai: พริบพรี) or Srijayavajrapuri (from Jaya+Vajra+buri from Sanskrit), was a Xiān political entity located on the west coast of the Bay of Bangkok, lower central Thailand. It was re-established in the 12th century by a ruler of the Padumasuriyavaṃśa line who came south from the Sukhothai–Nakhon Thai region. Previously, the city was a maritime-oriented port on the ancient trade route between India and China during the Dvaravati period, but was abandoned around the 11th century following the decline of the Dvaravati civilization. In the 12th century, Phrip Phri was possibly under Lavo's Ayodhya since several royals from Ayodhya were appointed the rulers of Phrip Phri, as mentioned in local chronicles and legends. It then became the vassal of the emerging Siamese Sukhothai and later formed part of the Ayutthaya kingdom in 1351, which made it a fortified frontier town of Ayutthaya. The province holds an older coastal centre at Khao Chao Lai, on the shore of what is now Cha-am district, from which Walailak Songsiri derives the later town rather than from any settlement in the Phetchaburi River basin.

A survey by Phōngsi Wanasin and Thiwa Supcanya found the ancient settlements of the plain arranged in two rows above the 3.5-metre contour, the western running from Phetchaburi through Ratchaburi to Suphanburi. David K. Wyatt, who reports the survey, reads the rows as the fringes of a plain then largely under water rather than as a shoreline. He also reports a ruler of Phetburi, styled Śrī Maheśvastidṛḍhirājākṣatriya in a year he reads as 1204, who entered trade relations with China and sent troops and colonists north to Chainat and south. Wyatt notes that the name is not that of Wolters's and Cœdès's Mahīdharavarman, but is close enough to be of interest.

Phetchaburi lay on the overland leg of the route between the Sukhothai country and Sri Lanka. Wyatt traces it from Sukhothai through Suphanburi and Phetchaburi to Nakhon Si Thammarat, then across the peninsula to Trang and by sea to the island. He distinguishes the journeys of the 11th century, made by monks who went to live in Lanka, from those of the 12th and 13th, made to bring back a more rigorous Theravada whose observance required literacy in Pali. Originally, Phetchaburi was known as Pipeli (พลิพลี) or Pribpri (พริบพรี), and was counted among the southern kingdoms of Thai history alongside Tambralinga. Its name was recorded in De la Louère's memo during the reign of King Narai in the middle of the Ayutthaya period.

Phetchaburi has been the location of multiple summer palaces commissioned by various kings. In 1860 King Rama IV built a palace near the city of Phetchaburi, commonly known as Khao Wang, but its official name is Phra Nakhon Khiri. Next to the palace the king built a tower for his astronomical observations. On the adjoining hill is the royal temple Wat Phra Kaeo.

In 1910 King Rama V constructed Phra Ram Ratchaniwet, now also known as Ban Puen Palace, slightly further south of Khao Wang. This was completed in the reign of King Rama VI, who also built Mrigadayavan Palace in Cha-am district in 1923.

The murals of Wat Ko Kaeo Suttharam in Mueang Phetchaburi district carry a date equivalent to 1734 or 1735. Chris Baker and Pasuk Phongpaichit treat it as the only securely dated site in their survey of late Ayutthaya wat murals. They record that the donors named in the paintings were men and women living in villages nearby rather than members of the court. They caution that most surviving murals have been restored or repainted, probably several times.

The photographer John Thomson, who visited the area in the 1860s, wrote in an account published in 1875 that the villages near Phetchaburi were home to four or five thousand Lao captives settled there in earlier times. He reported that they were permitted to grow rice on crown land without impost but were taxed heavily in other ways, and that they had built the king's palace at their own maintenance.

== Geography ==
Phetchaburi is at the north end of the Malay Peninsula, with the Gulf of Thailand to the east and the Tanaosi mountain range forming the boundary with the Tanintharyi Division of Myanmar. Except for these border mountains most of the province is a flat plain. With an area of 2,915 km^{2} (1,125 sq mi), Kaeng Krachan National Park is Thailand's largest national park and covers nearly half of the province. It and five others make up region 3 (Phetchaburi branch) of Thailand's protected areas. It protects mostly rain forests in the mountains along the boundary to Myanmar, but also the Kaeng Krachan Reservoir is part of the park. The total forest area is 3,562 km^{2} (1,375 sq mi) or 57.7% of provincial area. The only significant river of the province is the Phetchaburi River.

== Administrative divisions ==
Province with districts

=== Symbols ===
The provincial seal shows the Khao Wang palace in the background. In front are rice fields bordered by two coconut palm trees, symbolizing the major crops in the province.

The provincial tree is Eugenia cumini. Thai mahseer (Tor tambroides) is a provincial fish that is delicious and used to be found in the Phetchaburi River.

=== Provincial government ===
The province is divided into eight districts (amphoe), which are further divided into 93 subdistricts (tambons) and 681 villages (mubans).

In addition to the landlocked capital Mueang Phetchaburi, the main settlements are Cha-am (a beach resort), Ban Laem (coastal, with salt production and seafood), Ban Lat (farming), Tha Yang (farming and markets), Khao Yoi (caves, and Thai Song Dam settlement), Nong Ya Plong (mountainous, with hot springs) and Kaeng Krachan (holding Kaeng Krachan National Park).

1. Mueang Phetchaburi
2. Khao Yoi
3. Nong Ya Plong
4. Cha-am
5. Tha Yang
6. Ban Lat
7. Ban Laem
8. Kaeng Krachan

=== Local government ===
As of 26 November 2019 there are: one Phetchaburi Provincial Administration Organisation (ongkan borihan suan changwat) and 15 municipal (thesaban) areas in the province. Phetchaburi and Cha-am have town (thesaban mueang) status. Further 13 subdistrict municipalities (thesaban tambon). The non-municipal areas are administered by 69 Subdistrict Administrative Organisations – SAO (ongkan borihan suan tambon).

== Demography ==
=== Human Achievement Index 2022 ===
Health	Education	Employment	Income
14	13	13	22
Housing	Family	Transport	Participation
43	59	27	33
Province Phetchaburi, with an HAI 2022 value of 0.6733 is "high", occupies place 4 in the ranking.

Since 2003, United Nations Development Programme (UNDP) in Thailand has tracked progress on human development at sub-national level using the Human Achievement Index (HAI), a composite index covering all the eight key areas of human development. National Economic and Social Development Board (NESDB) has taken over this task since 2017.

Rank	Classification
1 – 13	"high"
14 – 29	"somewhat high"
30 – 45	"average"
46 – 61	"somewhat low"
62 – 77	"low"

Map with provinces and HAI 2022 rankings

=== Culture and art ===
Phetchaburi has a distinctive artistic style, known as the "Phet School". Among its handicrafts is banana stalk carving, for which the province is known. Traditionally, these carvings were used to decorate crematoriums during funerals. The region is also known for its Thai lacquerware and other traditional crafts.

=== Culinary culture ===
Notable dishes in Phetchaburi include:

- Khanom mo kaeng: A Thai coconut and egg custard, the best-known souvenir of the province.
- Khao chae: A traditional Thai dish that is increasingly rare in modern times but remains commonly found in Phetchaburi. Influenced by Mon cuisine, its name literally means "soaked rice".
- Kaeng lok: An authentic curry unique to Phetchaburi. It is a rare dish, little known even within the province, with only a few restaurants still preparing and selling it today. The name translates directly to "false curry", as it is made with curry paste that contains no chili, unlike other curries.
- Kuay teaw mam daeng: Braised pork noodles served in a special sweet, red-colored broth.
- Nam phrik lam pan: A traditional Thai spicy chili sauce (nam phrik) incorporating lam pan, a species of mangrove fruit that gives it a distinctive flavor. It is considered a delicacy of Phetchaburi and was voted the "Lost Taste" of the province in 2024.

== Ecology ==
Phetchaburi's shoreline on the Inner Gulf of Thailand in the area of Pak Thale consists of salt pans, mudflats, mangroves, and sand spits. It has been termed, "the premier bird watching site for shorebirds in Thailand". The 123-acre site provides sustenance for both passage and wintering species, as well as residents. The area hosts more than 7,000 waterbirds during the northern hemisphere winter. Economic development of the tidal flats, compounded by the impacts of climate change, threaten this ecosystem's future. Several regular visitors are under threat, including the critically endangered Spoon-billed sandpiper and Great knot, Nordmann's greenshank, and Far Eastern curlew.

Location protected area of Phetchaburi

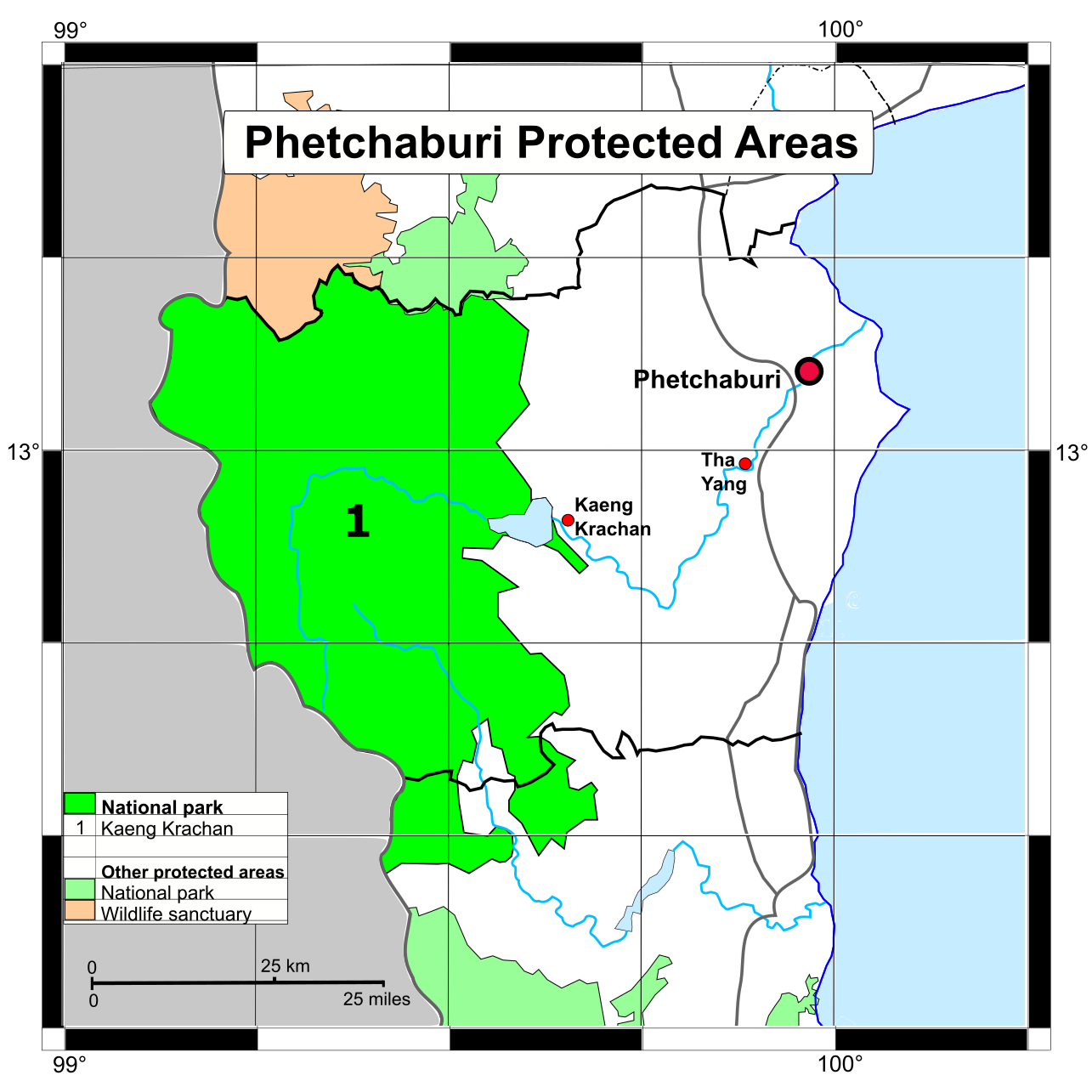
Phetchaburi protected area

	National park
1	Kaeng Krachan

== Economy ==
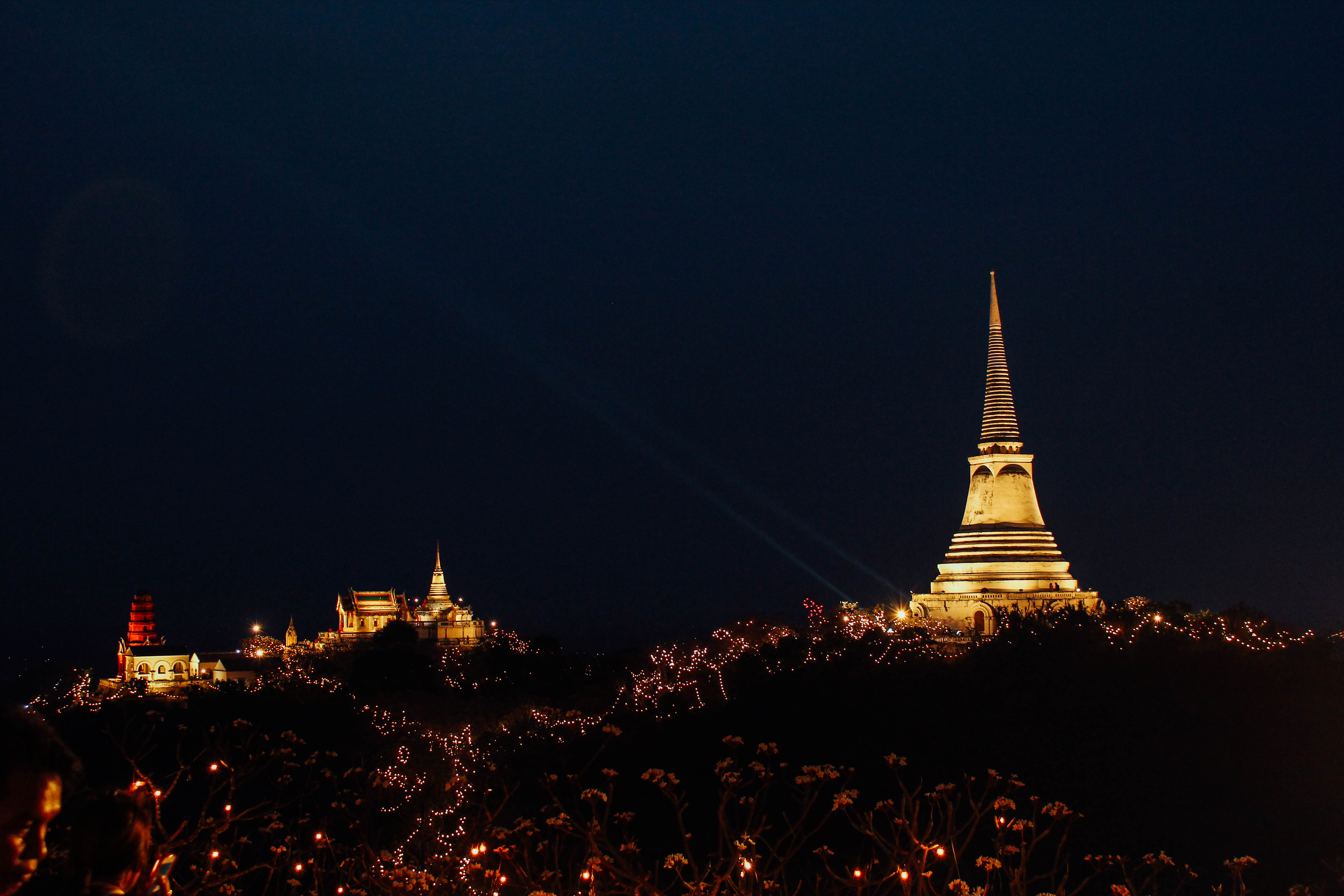
Phra Nakhon Khiri Historical Park (Khao Wang), coastal and hill nations park tourism is one of the key driver of the local economy.

=== Primary production ===
Phetchaburi province is an important salt producer. In 2011, 9,880 rai worked by 137 families were devoted to salt production in Phetchaburi.

The province is known for its palm sugar (Thai: น้ำตาลปึก; RTGS: nam tan puek). It has more sugar palm trees than any other province. Producing sugar is a specialty of Ban Lat District in particular. It is a key ingredient in many traditional Thai desserts, such as Khanom mo kaeng, which has earned Phetchaburi the nickname "city of desserts".

=== Health ===
Phetchaburi's main hospital is Phrachomklao Hospital, operated by the Ministry of Public Health.

=== Tourism ===
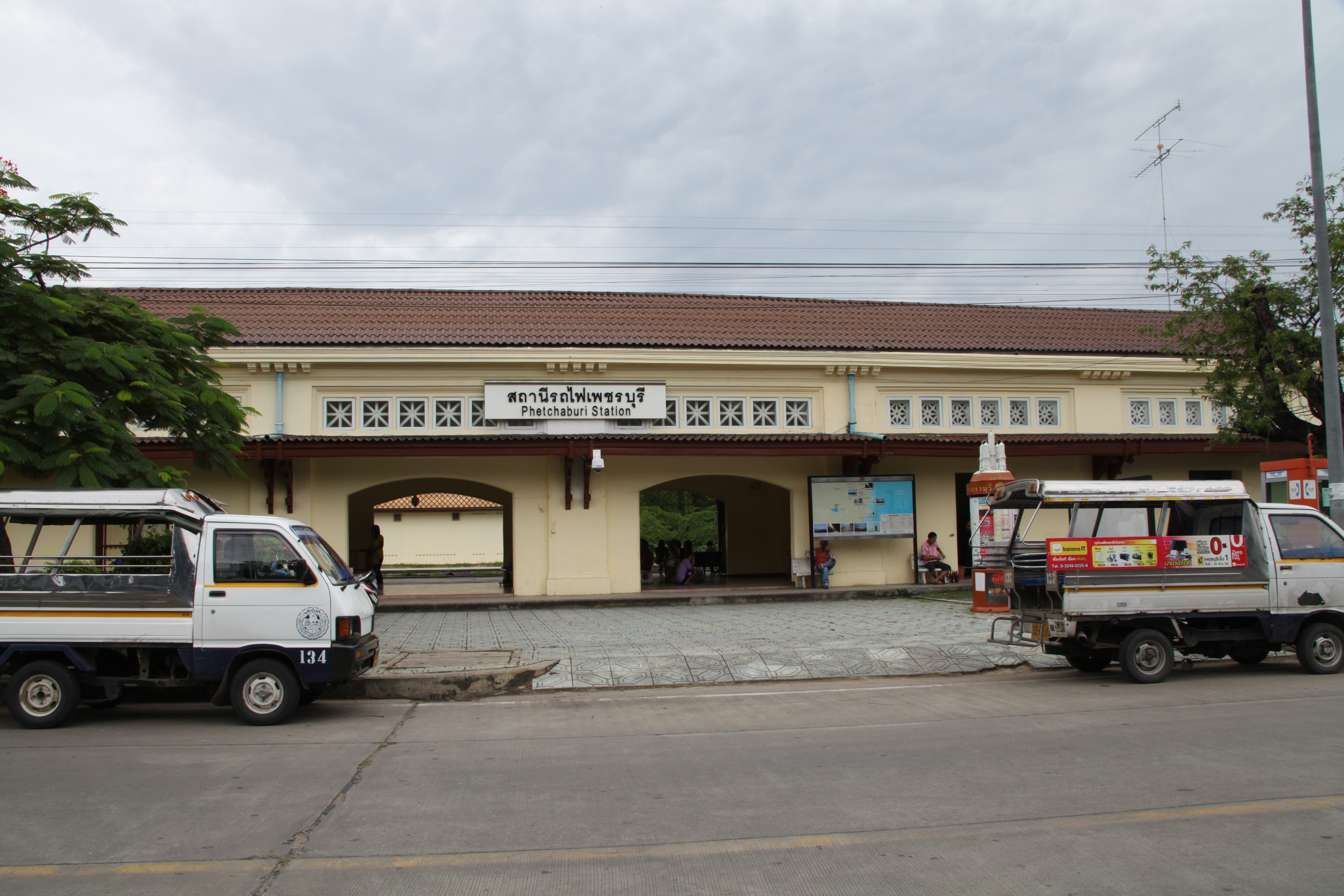
Phetchaburi Railway Station.

Tourism plays a significant role in the economy of Phetchaburi province. The province, however, has dropped from the fourth to the sixth most popular destination in Thailand due to coastal erosion, much of it in Cha-am District, caused by rising sea levels leading to "deteriorating scenery".

== Transportation ==
Phetchaburi's main station is Phetchaburi Railway Station, 150.49 km (93.5 mi) south of Hua Lamphong Railway Station. An excursion train between Bangkok and Suan Son Pradiphat, which runs only on Saturdays, Sundays and public holidays, stops here and at Cha-am Railway Station.

== Gallery ==
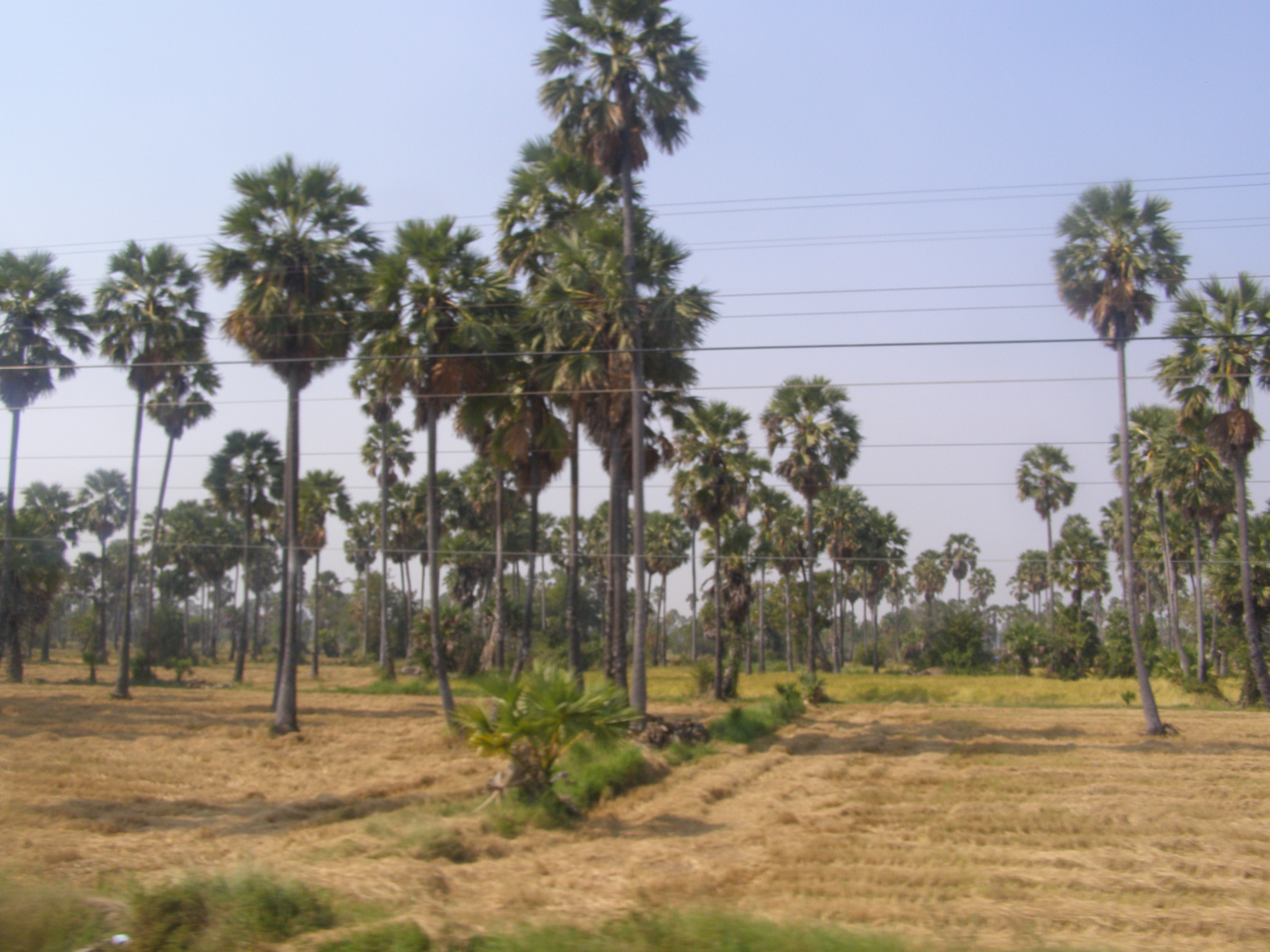
Toddy palm trees of Phetchaburi

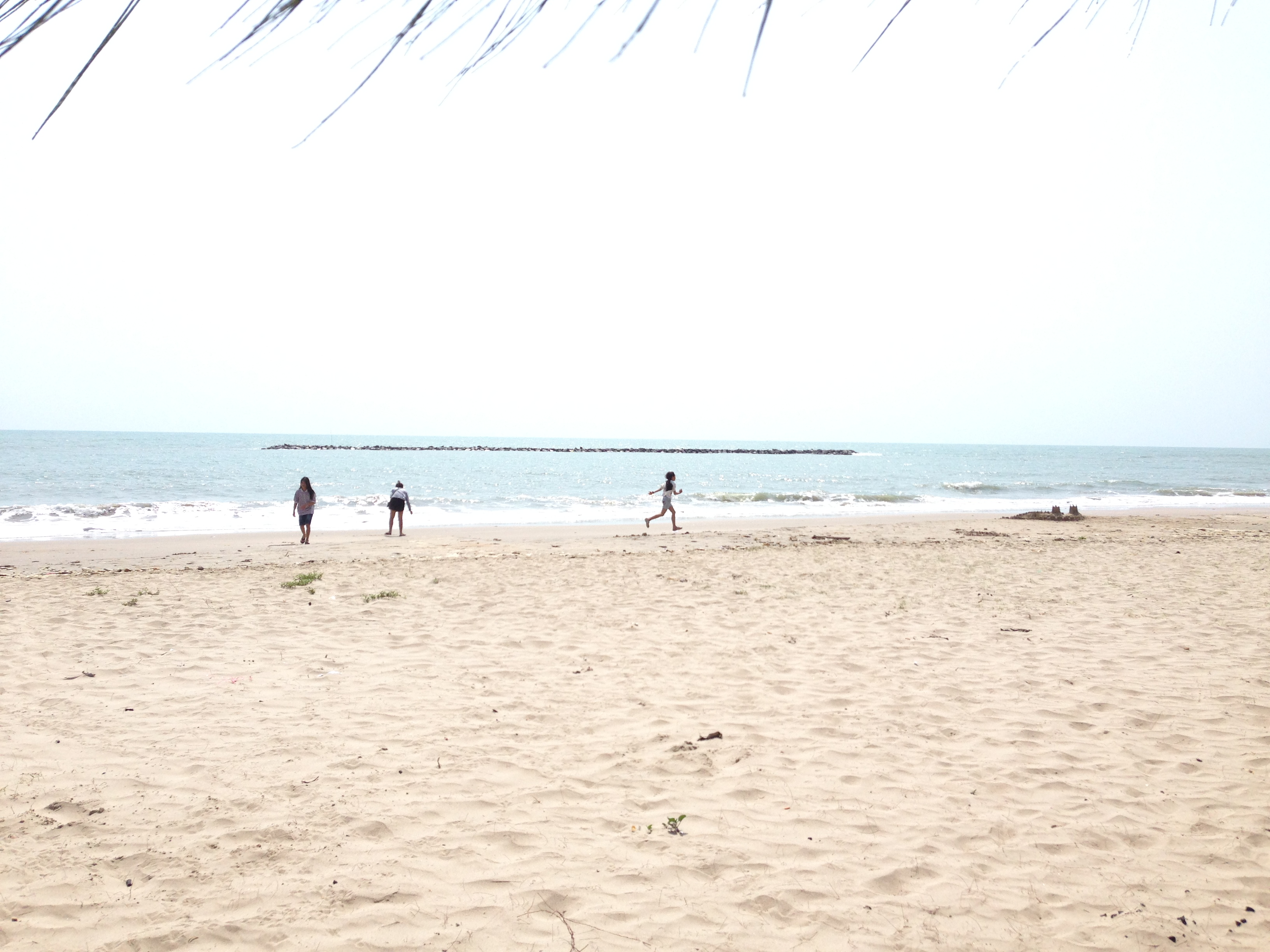
Hat Chao Samran

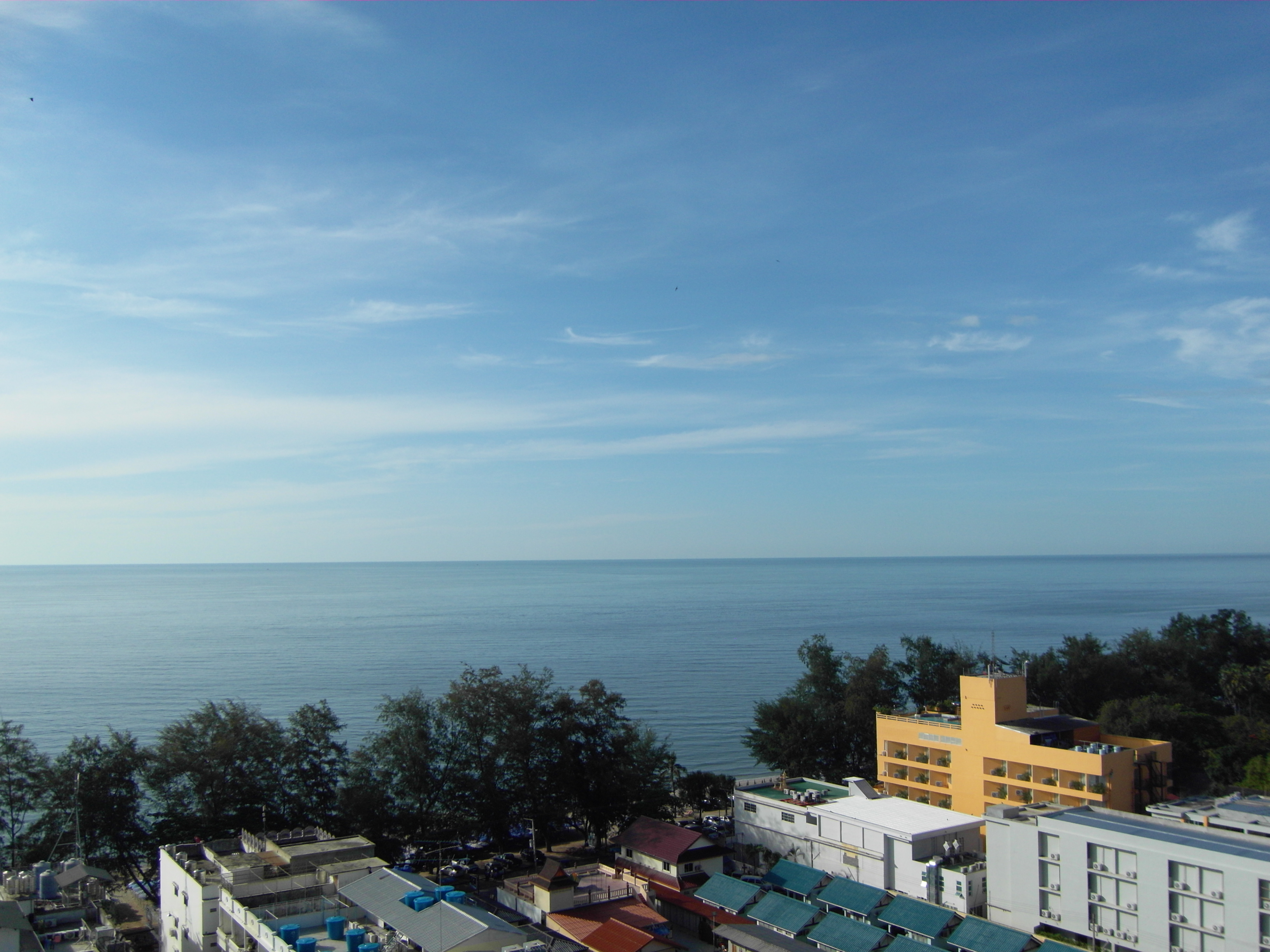
View of Cha-am district

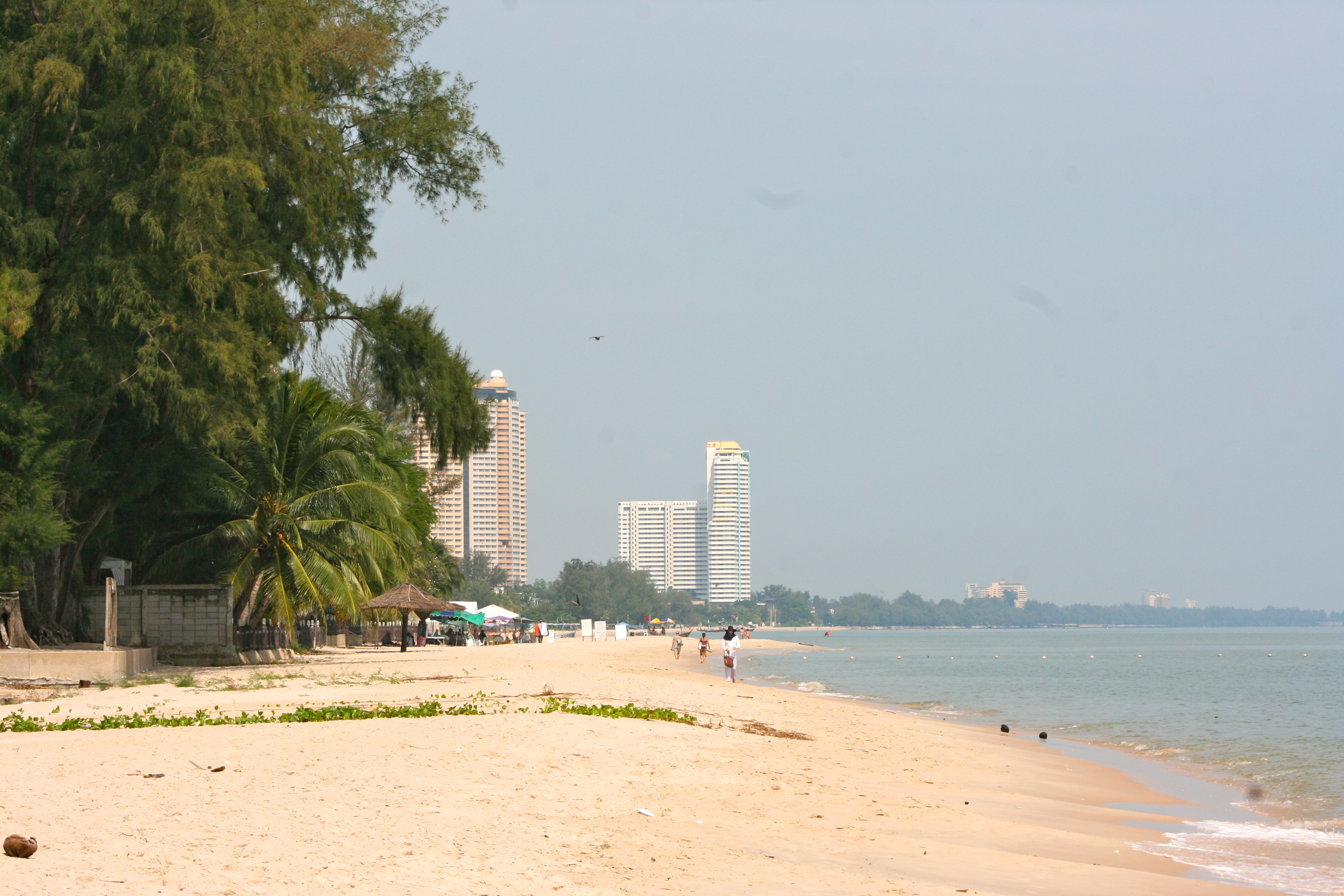
Hat Cha-am

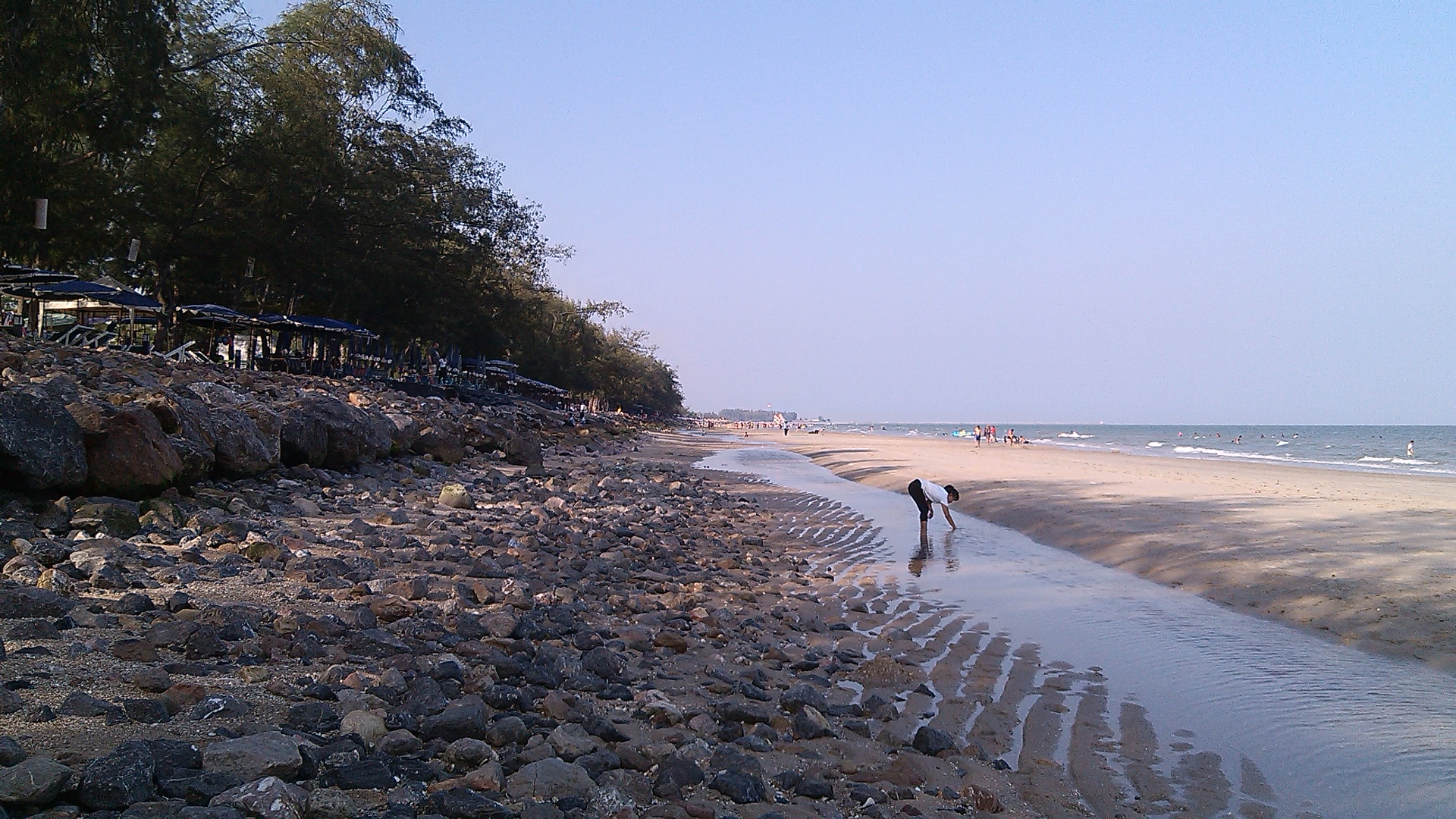
Hat Cha-am at low tide

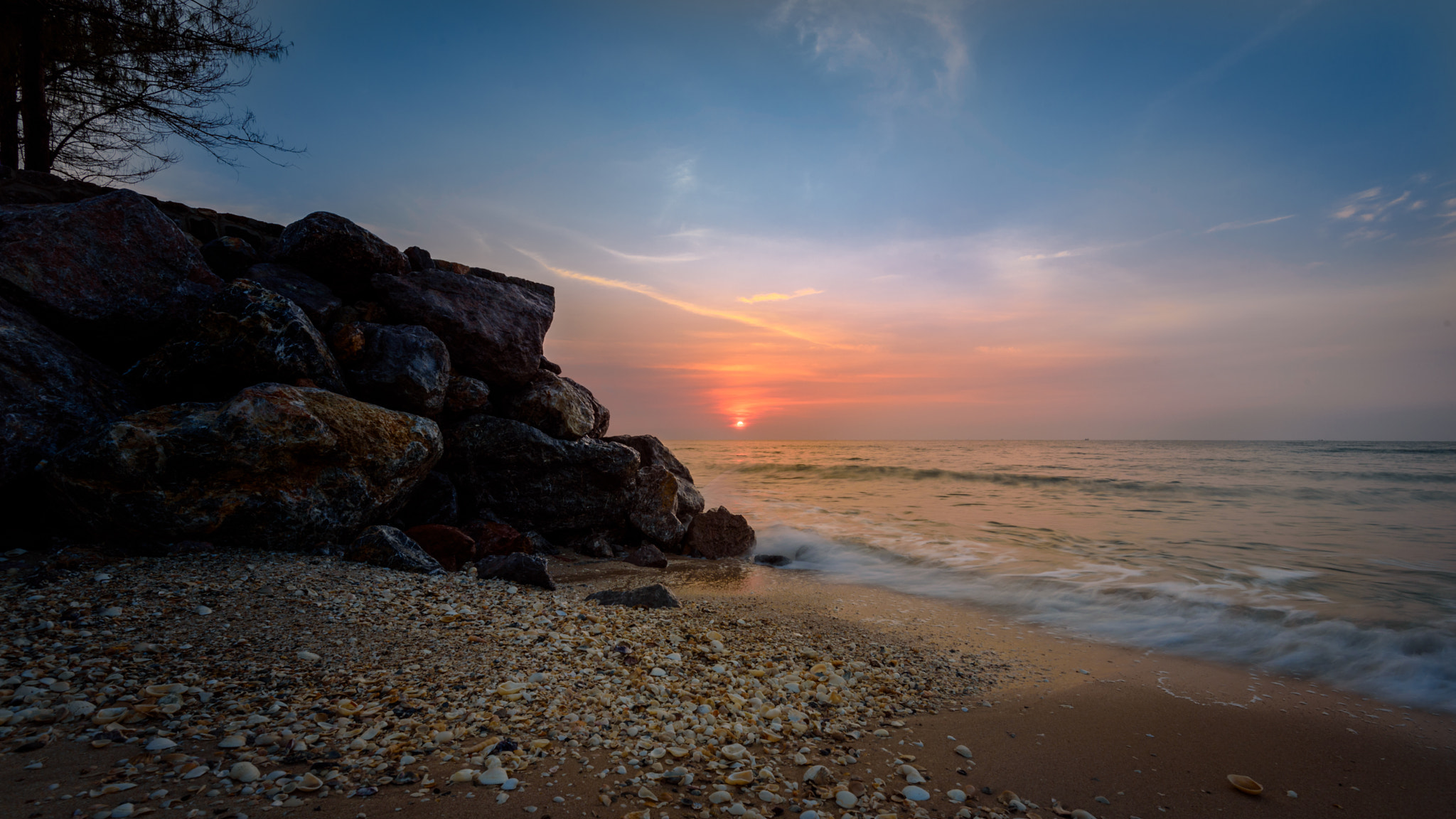
Sunrise at Hat Cha-am

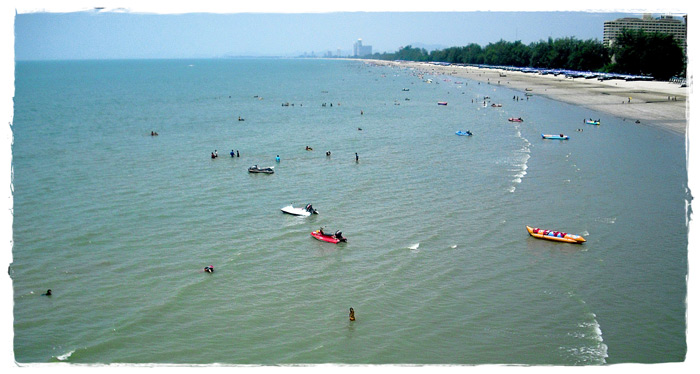
Aerial view of Hat Puek Tian beach

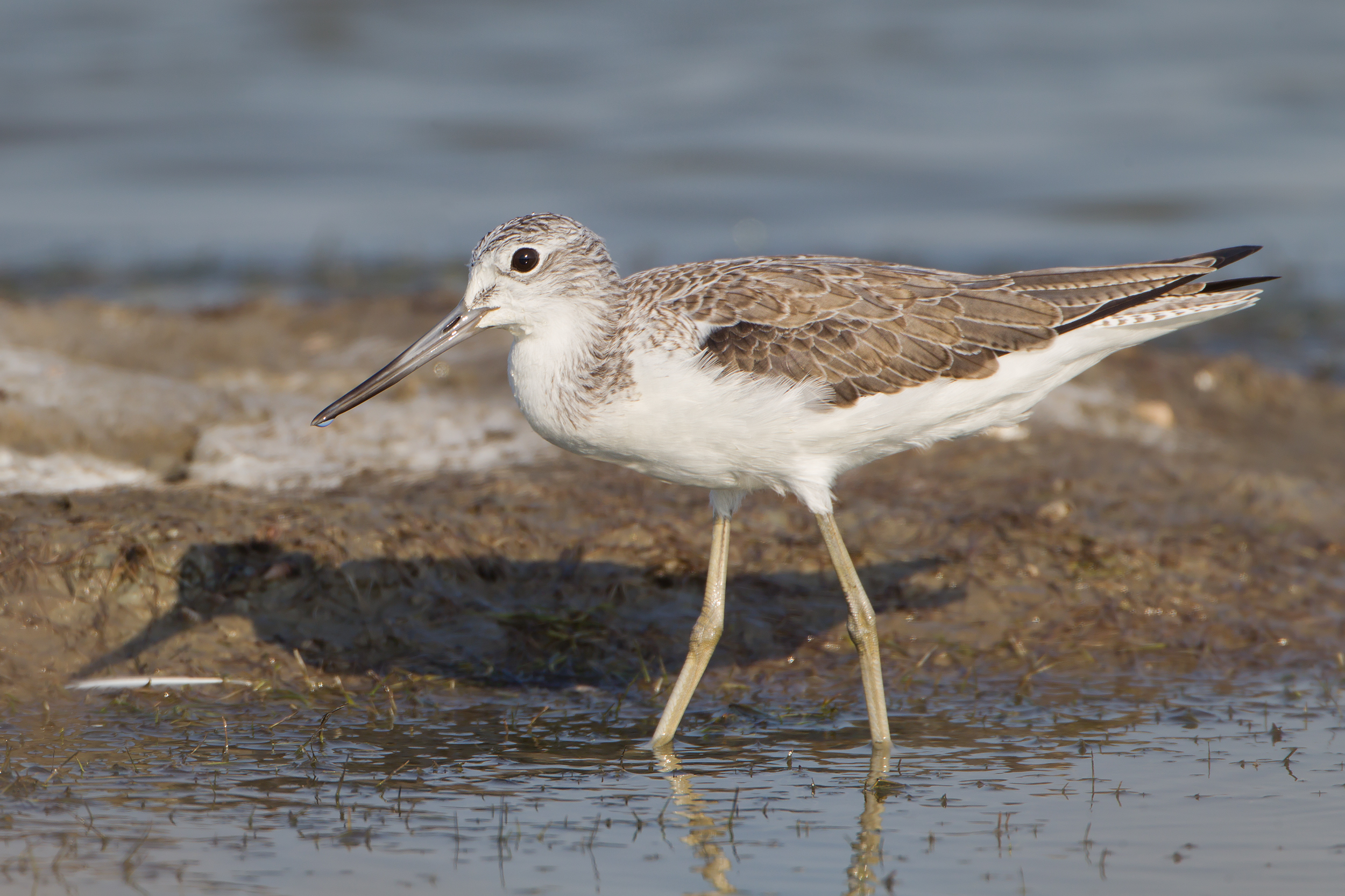
Common greenshank at Laem Phak Bia

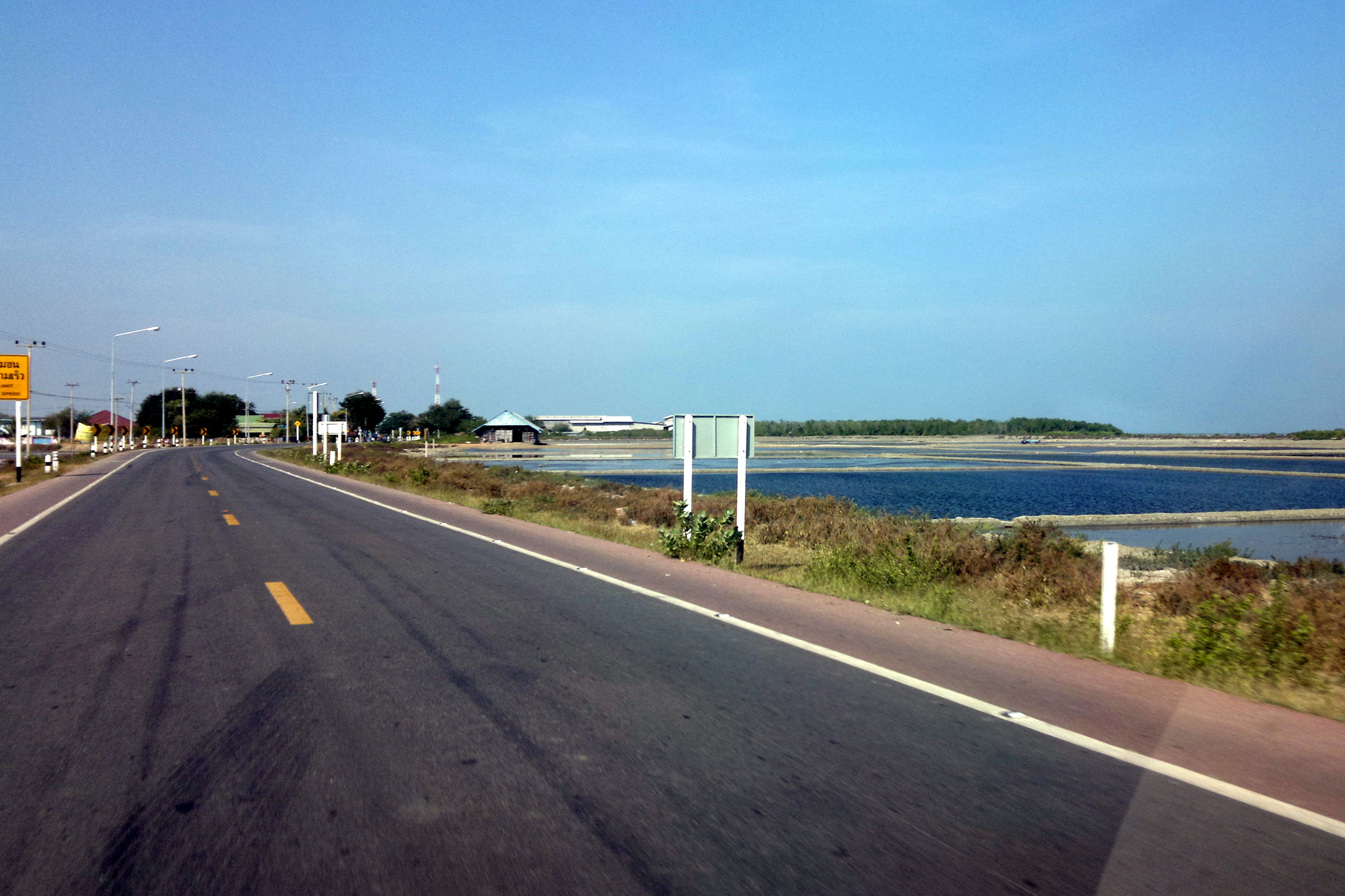
Highway connecting Cha-am to Hua Hin of Prachuap Khiri Khan

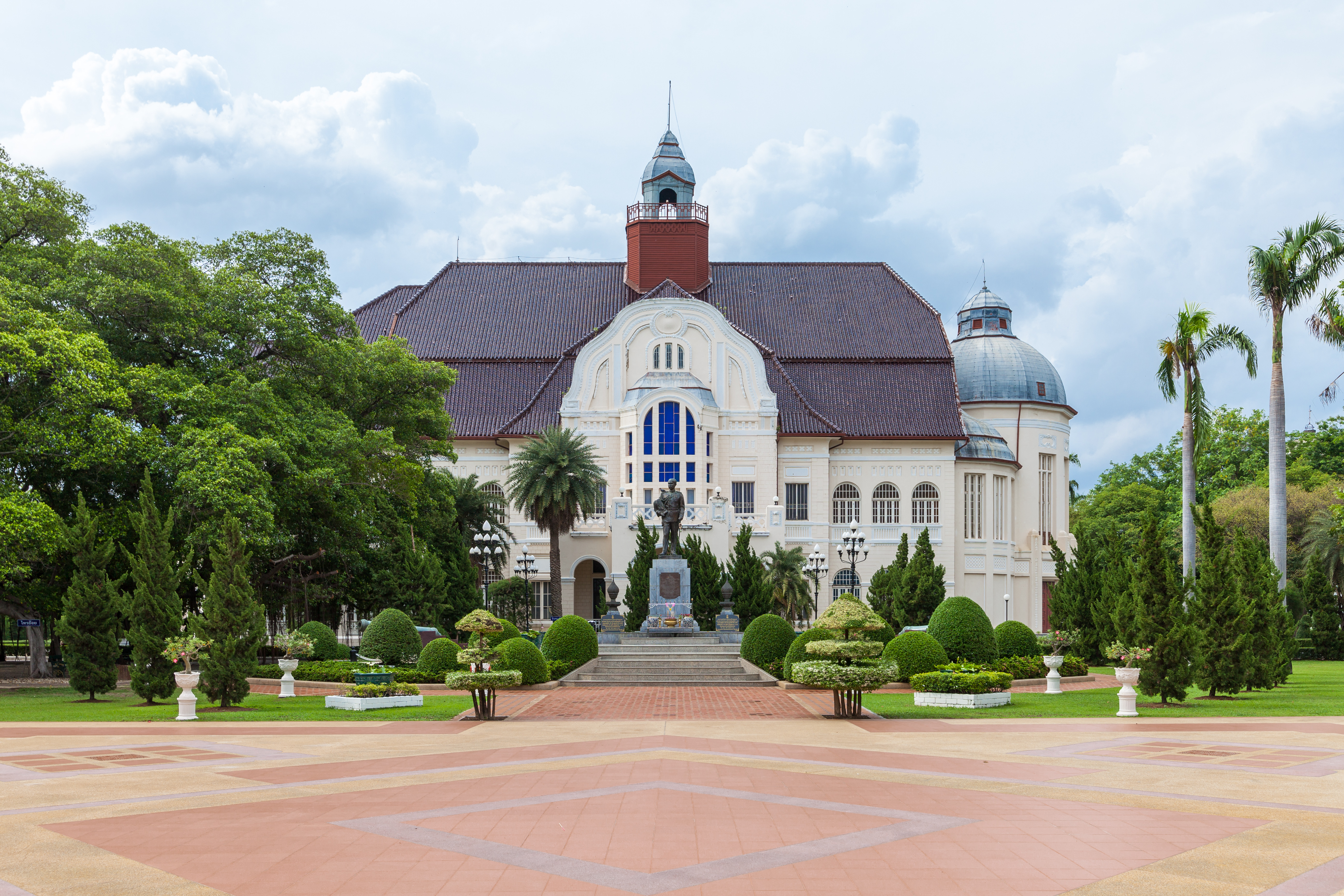
Phra Ram Ratchaniwet Palace

== See also ==
- Geography of Thailand
- Provinces of Thailand
- Southern Thailand
- Tourism in Thailand
