= Phrachomklao Hospital =

Phrachomklao Hospital โรงพยาบาลพระจอมเกล้า
- The Ministry of Public Health Health District 5

Geography
- Location: 53 Rotfai Road, Khlong Krasaeng Subdistrict, Mueang Phetchaburi District, Phetchaburi 76000, Thailand

Organisation
- Type: General

Services
- Beds: 447

History
- Former name: Phetchaburi Hospital
- Founded: 10 March 1951

Links
- Website: www.phrachomklao.go.th
- Lists: Hospitals in Thailand

Phrachomklao Hospital (Thai: โรงพยาบาลพระจอมเกล้า), sometimes stylised King Mongkut Memorial Hospital, is the main hospital of Phetchaburi Province, Thailand. It is classified under the Ministry of Public Health as a general hospital.

== History ==
Initially, when King Mongkut constructed the Phra Nakhon Khiri palace in 1861, he allowed a small missionary team to set up within the town below the palace. The first hospital operated by the missionaries opened in 1880 near Wat Noi and operated until 1934. In 1929, the Thai Red Cross Society set up a small health station which remained as the only health station that served Phetchaburi between 1934 and 1951. It still operates as The Red Cross Health Station 8 today.

The current hospital began construction in 1948 and was named Phetchaburi Hospital. It was opened on 10 March 1951. It was renamed Phrachomklao Hospital on 2 March 1989 in commemoration of King Mongkut. It is currently a general hospital with a capacity of 447 inpatient beds as of 2022.

== See also ==
- Healthcare in Thailand
- Hospitals in Thailand
- List of hospitals in Thailand
