= Historical parks of Thailand =

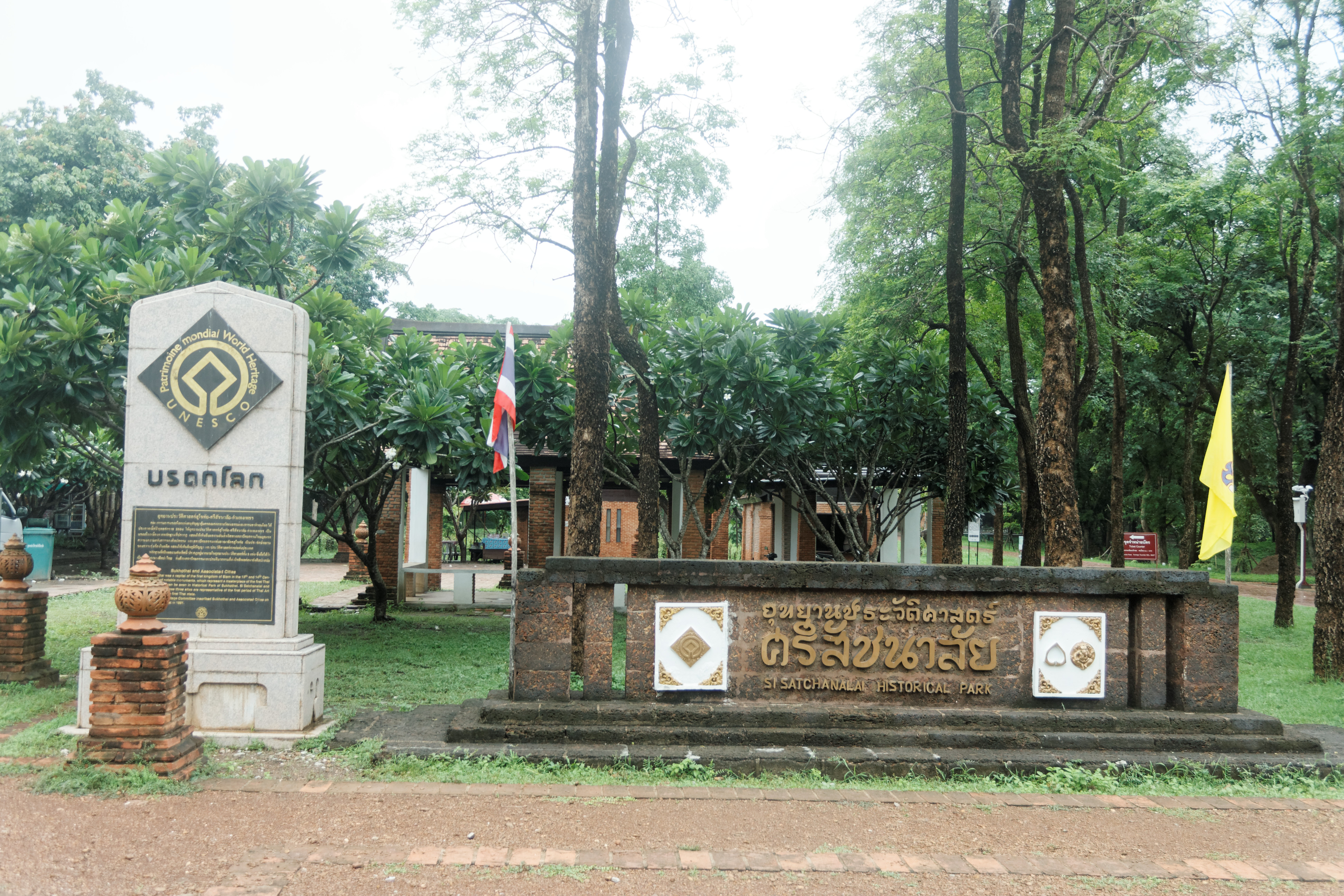
Entrance signs to Si Satchanalai Historical Park, showing the World Heritage Emblem

In Thailand, historical parks (Thai: อุทยานประวัติศาสตร์, pronounced [ùt.tʰa.jāːn prà.wàt.tì.sàːt]) are protected areas managed by the Fine Arts Department for their historical value, usually covering an extensive group of archaeological sites in an area, which are themselves legally protected as ancient monuments.

There are twelve historical parks, five of which constitute three of Thailand's World Heritage Sites:

Name	Province	Gazetted	Opened
Ayutthaya (Note: Historic City of Ayutthaya World Heritage Site)	Ayutthaya
Kamphaeng Phet (Note: Historic Town of Sukhothai and Associated Historic Towns)	Kamphaeng Phet
Mueang Sing	Kanchanaburi		April 1987
Phanom Rung	Buriram	1935	May 21, 1988
Phimai	Nakhon Ratchasima	1936	April 12, 1989
Phra Nakhon Khiri	Phetchaburi
Phu Phra Bat	Udon Thani
Sdok Kok Thom	Sa Kaeo
Si Satchanalai	Sukhothai
Si Thep (Note: The Ancient Town of Si Thep and Its Associated Dvaravati Monuments)	Phetchabun
Sukhothai	Sukhothai	1961	July 1988
The Nine Army Battle	Kanchanaburi		June 19, 2000

== See also ==
- List of protected areas of Thailand
