= Conservation in Thailand =

Conservation in Thailand may refer to:

- Cultural heritage conservation in Thailand
- Nature conservation in Thailand
