= Lai rot nam =

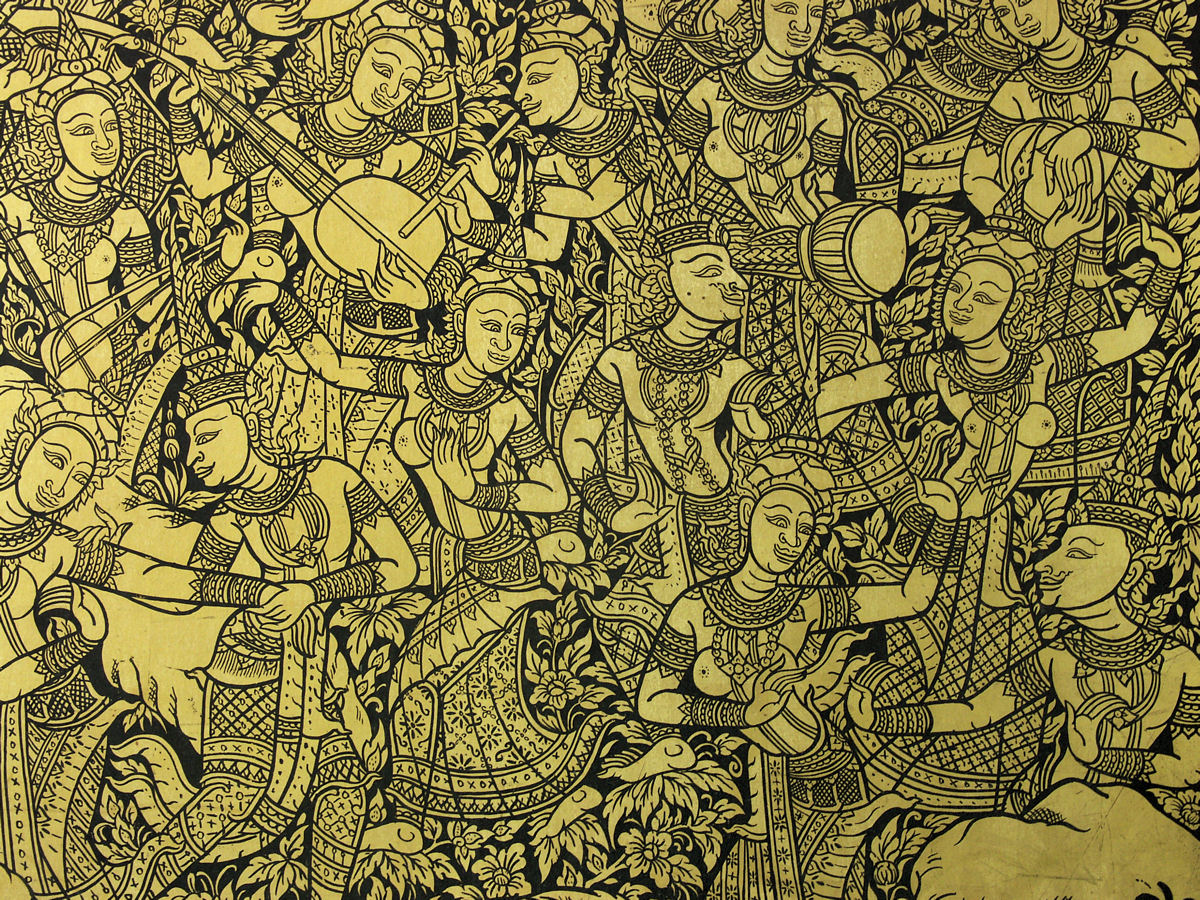
Detail from a window panel at Wat Suthat, decorated with the lai rot nam technique

Lai rot nam (Thai: ลายรดน้ำ) or gilded black lacquer is a technique in the traditional Thai decorative arts consisting of the application of black lacquer with gold inlay to surfaces. It was used in the decoration of wooden furniture, especially cabinets, as well as door and window panels, in palaces and Buddhist temples. The art form developed during the Ayutthaya period, reaching its zenith during the seventeenth to early eighteenth centuries, and continued during the Thonburi and Rattanakosin periods.

The technique consists of applying to the wooden panel several coats of black lacquer, a resin from the Burmese lacquer tree known in Thai as rak. The drawing is then traced, and the parts to remain black are painted over with a yellow-gummy mixture known in Thai as namya horadan (น้ำยาหรดาล). The next process is to give a thin coat of lacquer over the surface, and when it is semi-dry, gold leaf is applied over the whole surface. After about twenty hours the work is washed with water to detach the gummy-paint, exposing the lacquer and leaving the remaining gold inlay in the unpainted areas. The application of gold leaf and washing with water give the technique its name, fully lai pit thong rot nam (ลายปิดทองรดน้ำ, "designs of applied gold leaf washed with water"), but often shortened to just lai rot nam ("designs washed with water").
