= Phra Nakhon Khiri Historical Park =

Historical park on a hill in Thailand

- อุทยานประวัติศาสตร์พระนครคีรี
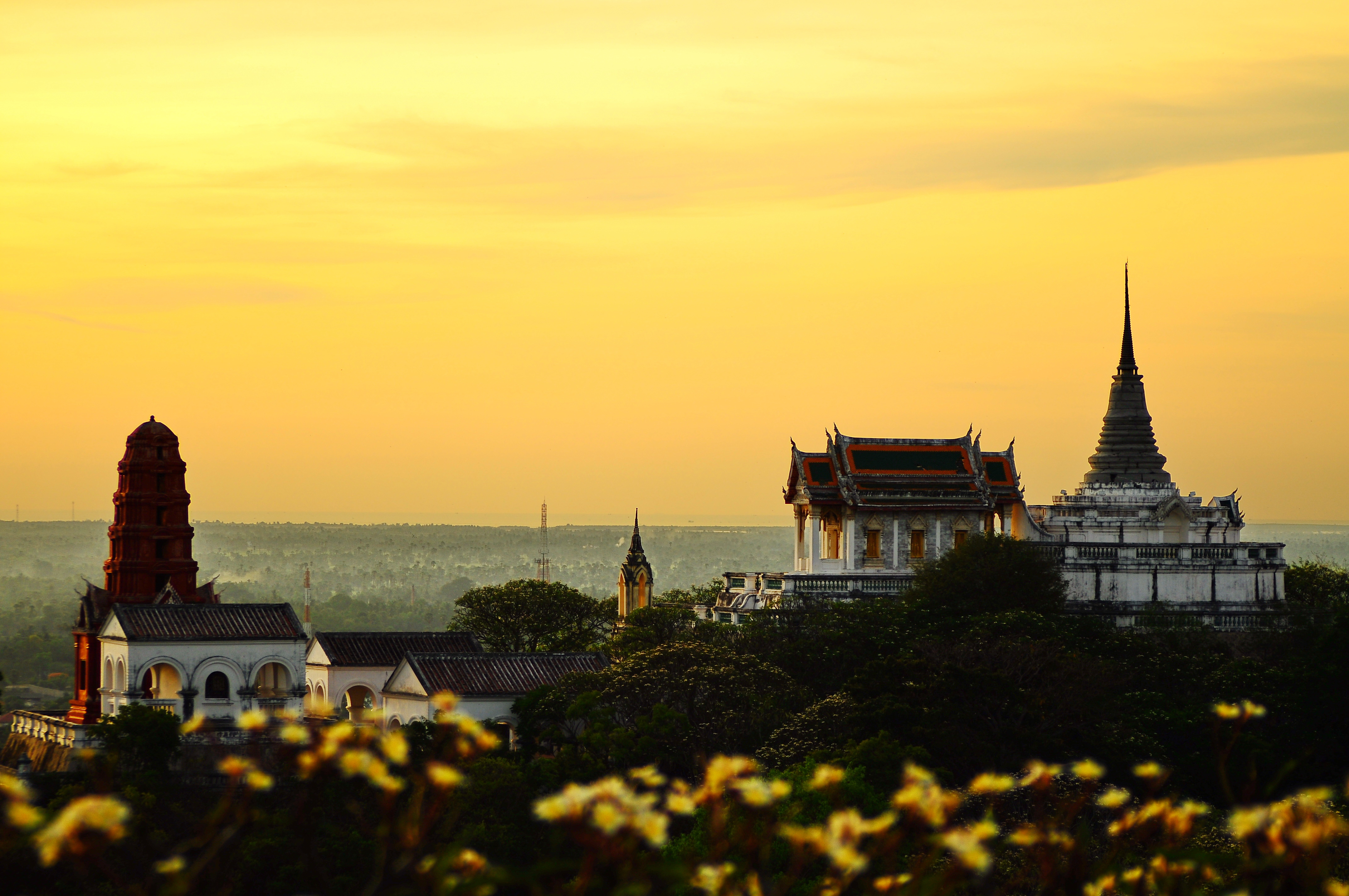
- Wat Phra Kaeo

- Location within Thailand
- Type: Historical palace with museum
- Nearest city: Phetchaburi
- Coordinates: 13.1089°N 99.9365°E
- Created: 1979
- Status: Historical Park, Thailand

Phra Nakhon Khiri (Thai: อุทยานประวัติศาสตร์พระนครคีรี) is a historical park in Phetchaburi, Thailand on a hill overlooking the city. The name Phra Nakhon Khiri means 'holy city hill', but locals know it better as Khao Wang, meaning 'hill with palace'.

The park consists of three building groups on the three peaks of the 95 m hill. On the western peak is the palace with adjoining structures. On the middle or central peak is a big chedi named Phra That Chom Phet. The eastern peak houses the Wat Phra Kaeo, the royal temple, built similarly to the Wat Phra Kaeo in Bangkok. The whole complex was built as a summer palace by King Mongkut, with construction finished in 1860.

The site was registered as a historical park on 27 August 1979, with two of the palace buildings now housing a branch of the Thai National Museum.

== Gallery ==
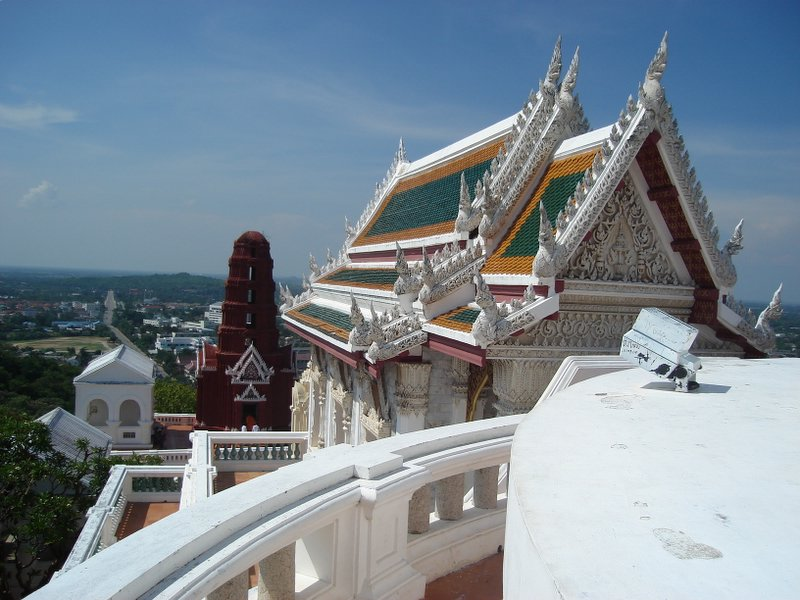

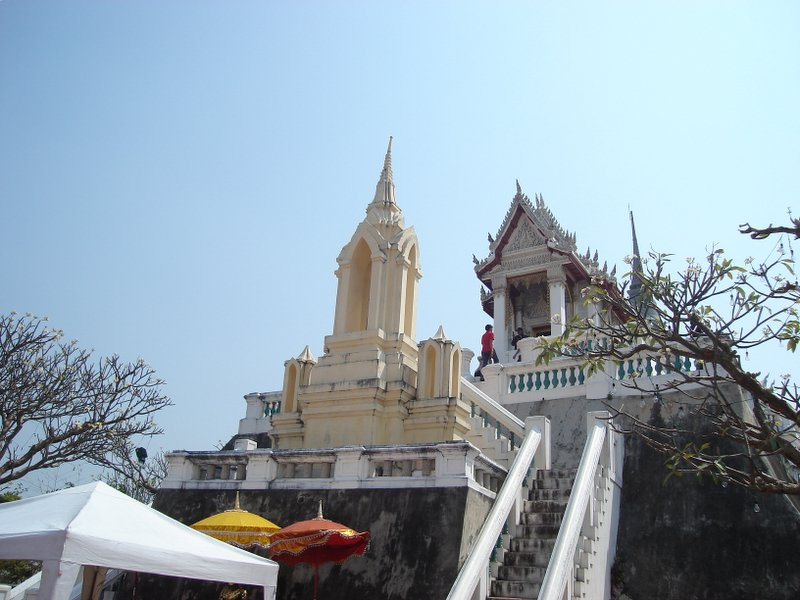

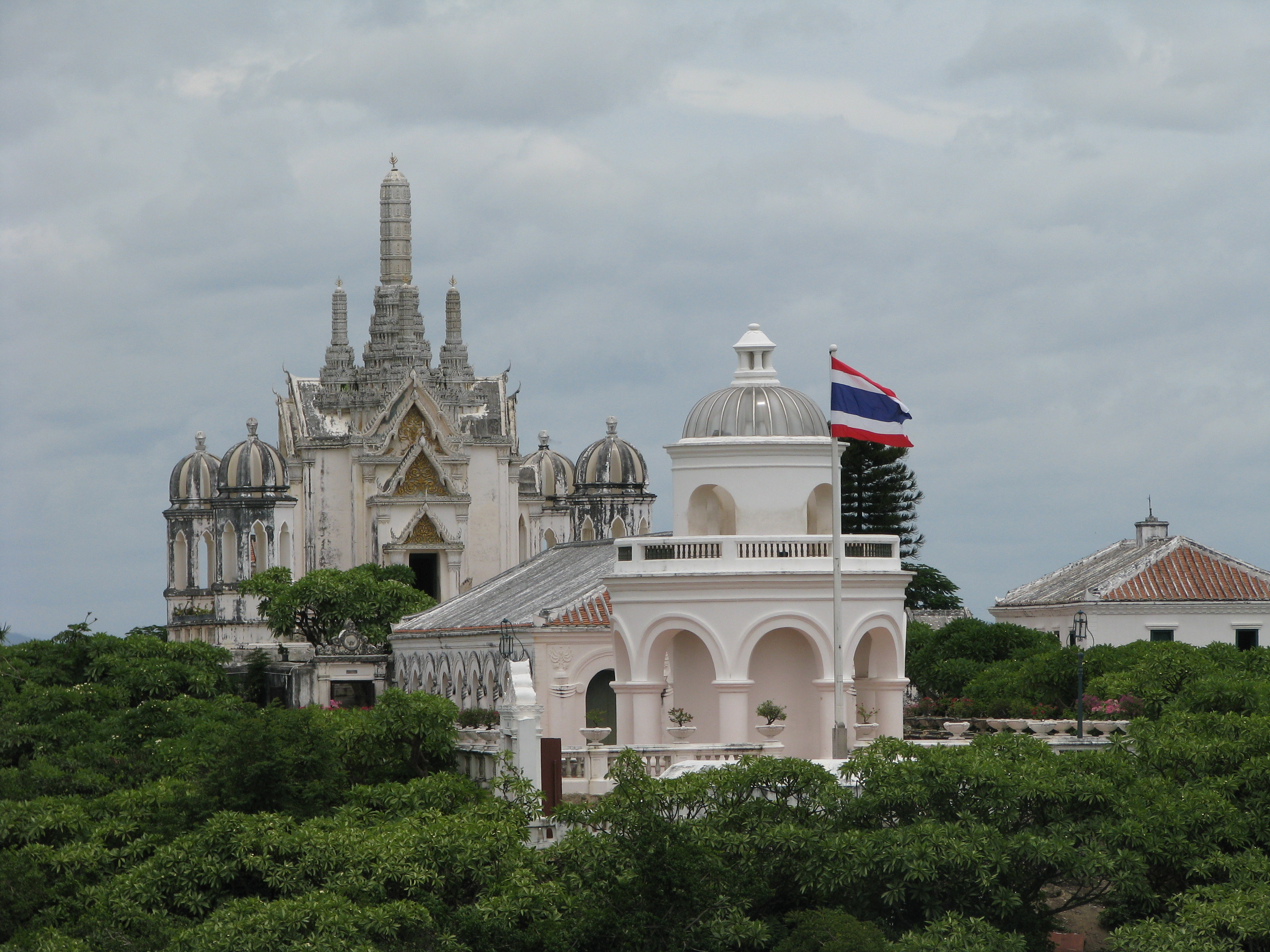

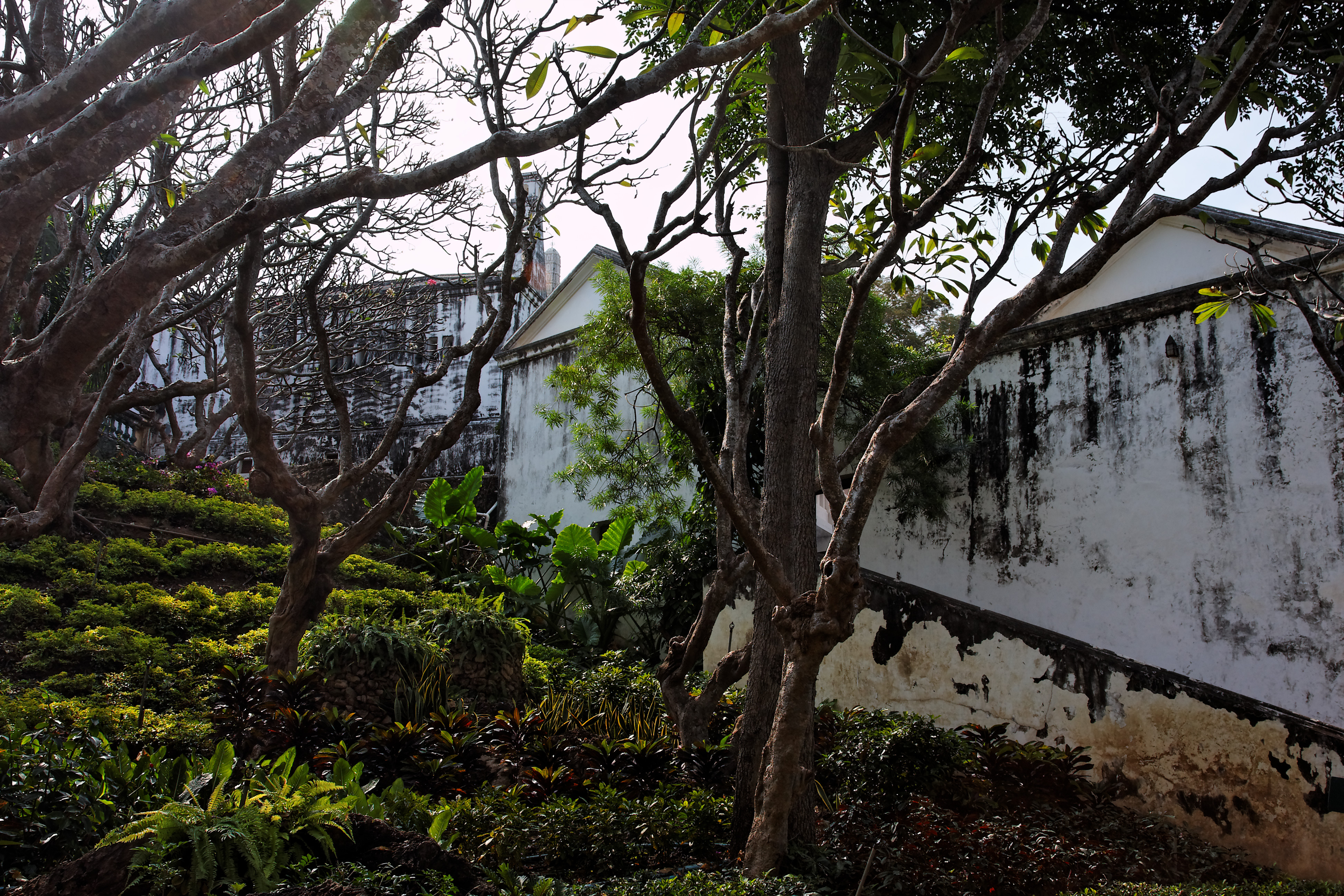

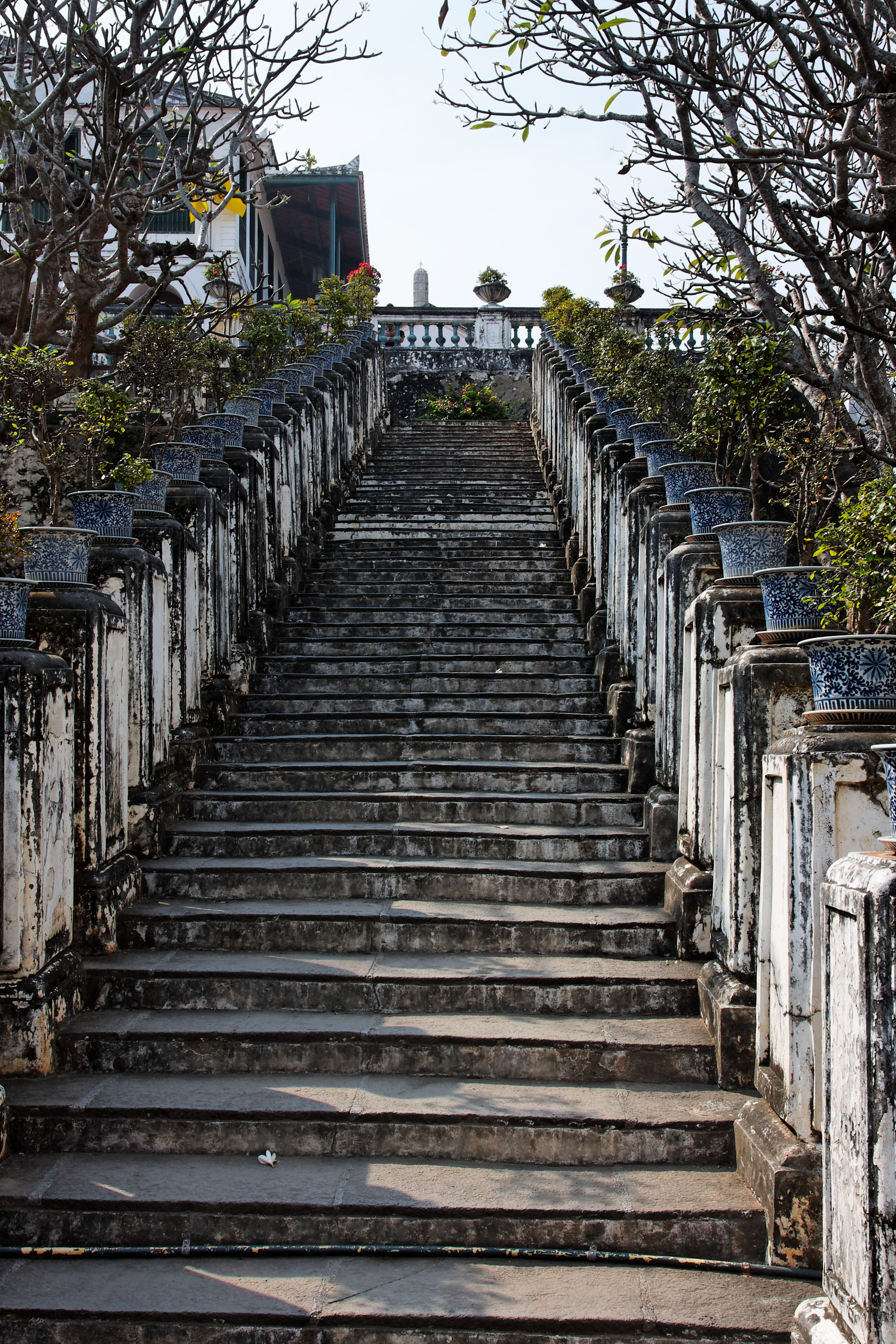

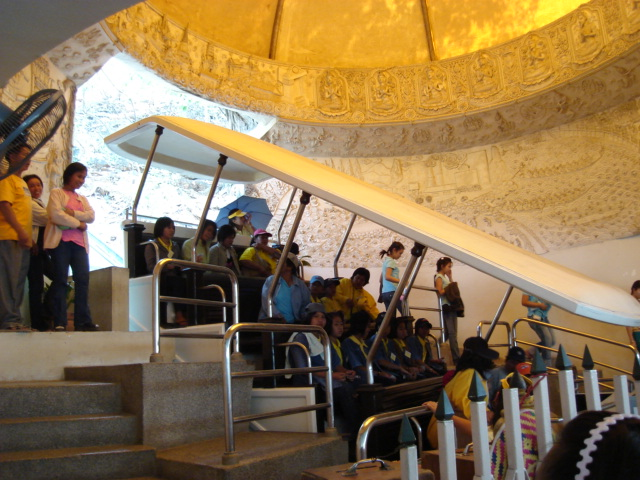
Funicular to the top of Khao Wang

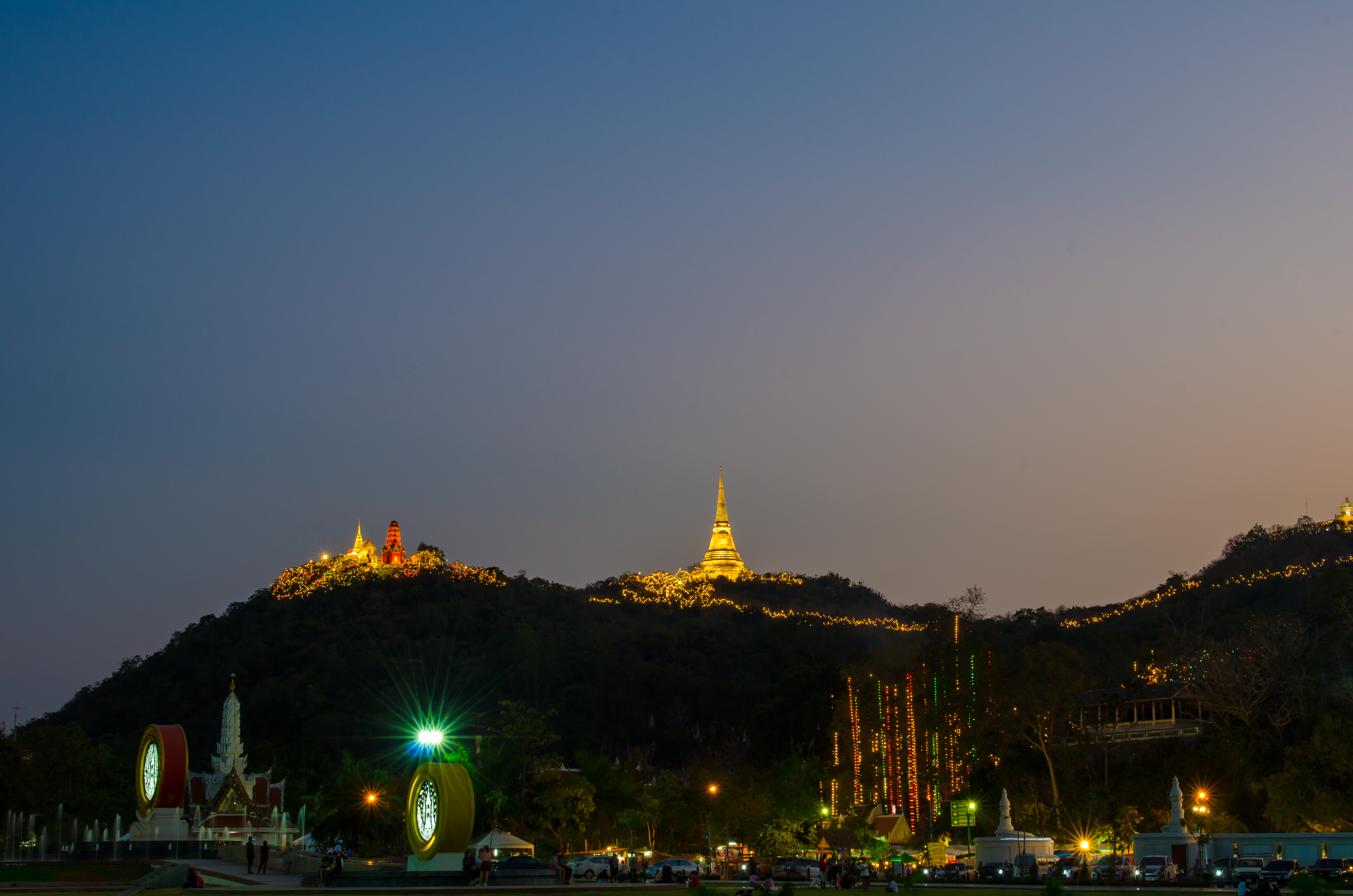
Khao Wang and Phra Nakhon Khiri Historical Park at night
