= Kaeng Krachan =

Kaeng Krachan may refer to the following places in Phetchaburi Province, Thailand:

- Kaeng Krachan District
- Kaeng Krachan Dam
- Kaeng Krachan National Park
- Kaeng Krachan Forest Complex, a World Heritage Site covering Kaeng Krachan National Park and some others
- Kaeng Krachan Circuit, a motorsports venue (race track)
