= Samo Phlue =

Coordinates: 13°03′42.5″N 99°57′20.0″E

Samo Phlue สมอพลือ
- Subdistrict
- Interactive map of Samo Phlue
- Country: Thailand
- Province: Phetchaburi
- District: Ban Lat
- Time zone: UTC+7 (ICT)
- Website: www.samorphlue.go.th/site/

Samo Phlue (Thai: สมอพลือ, pronounced [sā.mɔ̌ː pʰlɯ̄ː]) is a tambon (sub-district) of Ban Lat District, Phetchaburi Province, western Thailand.

== Geography ==
Neighboring sub-districts are (from the north clockwise): Ton Mamuang and Pho Rai Wan of Mueang Phetchaburi District and Tha Sen and Ban Lat of Ban Lat District. Most of the subdistrict consists of lowlands along the Phetchaburi River. An irrigation canal flows through Ban Samo Phlue, Ban Rai Kha, and Ban Don Phlap, providing water for agriculture.

== History ==
In the Ayutthaya period, Samo Phlue was the residence of the royal Brahmin, with settlements around 1457 (coincides King Trailok's reign). Brahmins were the gentry of their day, the ancestors of many important people in Thai history, for example, Princess Aphainuchit, mother of Prince Thammathibet; Princess Phiphit Montri, mother of two Ayutthaya kings, Uthumphon and Ekkathat; the royal poet of the early-Rattanakosin period, Sunthon Phu. His father descended from the Brahmin here.

The Phetchaburi River flowing through Wat Tha Chaisiri temple is still believed to be "holy water", thus used in the coronation ceremony of the Thai monarchs of each period.

== Administration ==
=== Central administration ===
The sub-district is divided into six administrative mubans (villages)

No.	Name	Thai
1.	Ban Samo Phlue	บ้านสมอพลือ
2.	Ban Tha Sai	บ้านท่าไทร
3.	Ban Rai Kha	บ้านไร่คา
4.	Ban Na Phanang	บ้านนาพนัง
5.	Ban Huai Suea	บ้านห้วยเสือ
6.	Ban Don Phlap	บ้านดอนพลับ

=== Local administration ===
The tambon is administered by the subdistrict administrative organization (SAO), Samo Phlue (องค์การบริหารส่วนตำบลสมอพลือ).

== Economy ==
Most Samo Phlue people work in agriculture.
