= Tham Rong =

Administrative Organization in Phetchaburi, Thailand

Tham Rong ถ้ำรงค์
- Subdistrict Administrative Organization (SAO)
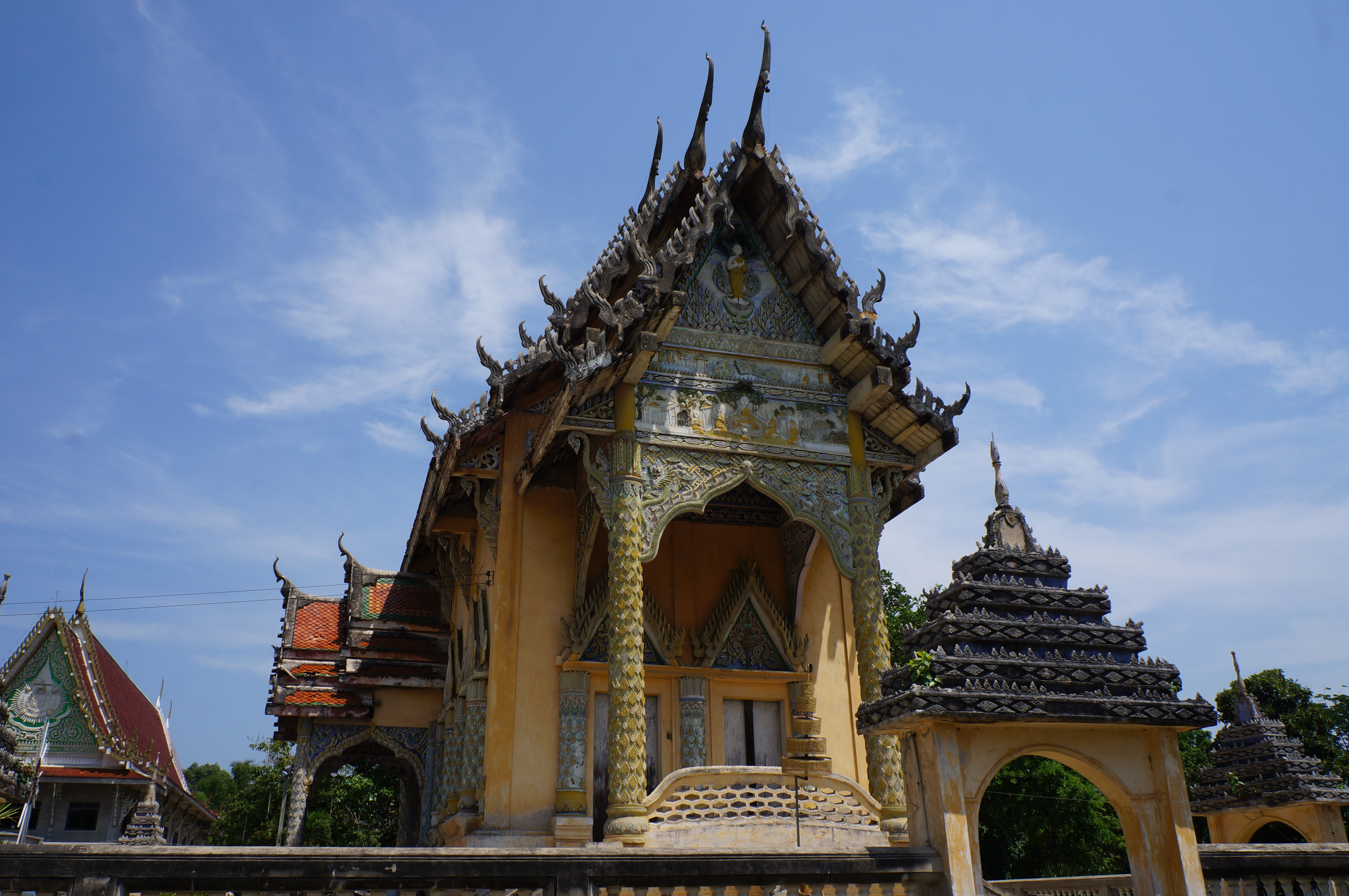
- Wat Tham Rong
- Mottoes: Elephant-Shaped Mount Tham Rong, Big Resin Trees, Crystal Clear Phetchaburi River, Renowned Luang Pho Thep, Big Black Buddha is Spiritual Anchor
- Interactive map of Tham Rong
- Coordinates: 13°01′12″N 99°55′12″E
- Country: Thailand
- Province: Phetchaburi
- District: Ban Lat
- Named for: Wat Tham Rong

Government
  - Mayor: Banphot Kamlaikaeo
  - Deputy Mayor: Samruay Dokrak
  - Deputy Mayor: Praphruek Phophuek
  - Secretary: Veerachart Chamnan

Area
  - Total: 10.3 km^{2} (4.0 sq mi)

Population
  - Total: 3,389
  - Density: 329/km^{2} (852/sq mi)
- Time zone: UTC+7 (ICT)
- Postcode: 76150
- Area code: (+66) 02
- Website: https://www.tamrong.go.th/public/

Tham Rong (Thai: ถ้ำรงค์, pronounced [tʰâm rʰōŋ]) is a tambon (subdistrict) of Ban Lat District, Phetchaburi Province, western Thailand.

== History ==
The name Tham Rong directly translated as "Rong cave". It is called after the local Buddhist temple of the same name, Wat Tham Rong, an ancient temple and local spiritual anchor. Near the temple is the cave called "Tham Luang Pho Dam" (ถ้ำหลวงพ่อดำ, pronounced [tʰâm lǔəŋpʰɔ̂ːdām], lit. 'reverend father black cave'). The evidence inside proves this subdistrict has been existed for thousand years.

Tham Rong was originally is in the area of Tamru. At that time, there were a total of 12 muban (village), later in 1979 there was a separation of Tam Rong from Tamru, with the Phetchaburi River as the boundary line.

== Geography ==
Most of the terrain is a floodplain with low mountains and waterway running through every village. The Phetchaburi River flows through the western part. Therefore, it is suitable for agricultural activities, such as rice farming, fruit orchards, etc.

Tham Rong has a total area of 6,438 rai (10.3 km^{2}; 4.0 sq mi) and is approximately 3 km (1.9 mi) from the downtown Ban Lat.

Neighbouring subdistricts are (from the north clockwise): Rai Makham in its district, Tha Yang in Tha Yang District, Tamru in its district.

== Administration ==
The entire area of Tham Rong is under the administration of Subdistrict Administrative Organization (SAO) Tham Rong (อบต.ถ้ำรงค์).

It also consists of six administrative villages.

No.	Name	Thai
1.	Ban Tha Mafeung	บ้านท่ามะเฟือง
2.	Ban Muang Ngam	บ้านม่วงงาม
3.	Ban Tham Rong	บ้านถ้ำรงค์
4.	Ban Rai Sathon	บ้านไร่สะท้อน
5.	Ban Don Thako	บ้านดอนตะโก
6.	Ban Nong Chang Tai	บ้านหนองช้างตาย

== Economy ==
Tham Rong is promoted as a cultural and community attraction.

Asian palmyra palm is an important cash crop.

== Places ==
- Wat Tham Rong and Tham Luang Pho Dam
- Wat Muang Ngam
- Thai Kite Making and Learning Centre
- Uncle Thanom Palm Orchard
