= Wat Phlapphla Chai, Phetchaburi =

Wat Phlapphla Chai
- วัดพลับพลาชัย

Religion
- Affiliation: Buddhism
- Sect: Theravāda Mahā Nikāya
- Status: Civilian temple

Location
- Location: 106, Damnoen Kasem Rd, Khlong Krachaeng, Mueang Phetchaburi District, Phetchaburi
- Country: Thailand
- Interactive map of Wat Phlapphla Chai
- Coordinates: 13.1070996725°N 99.9478744959°E

Architecture
- Founder: King Borommakot

Wat Phlapphla Chai (Thai: วัดพลับพลาชัย; pronounced [wát pʰláp.pʰlāː t͡ɕʰāj]) is an ancient Buddhist temple in Mueang Phetchaburi District, Phetchaburi Province, western Thailand.

== Description ==
The temple has been an important house of worship in its location, Khlong Krachaeng, for a long time. It is on the bank of Phetchaburi River. In Ayutthaya period this area was a military base where military troops had to stop on the way to the battlefield to fight with the Burmese army. According to the history, King Naresuan and King Ekathotsarot and other sovereigns of the Ban Phlu Luang dynasty from King Sanphet VIII (Tiger King) to King Borommakot stopped here before they moved to the battlefield. The name of the temple, "Phlapphla Chai" ("triumph pavilion"), represents victory. The temple is divided into two sides by the road and brick stairs.

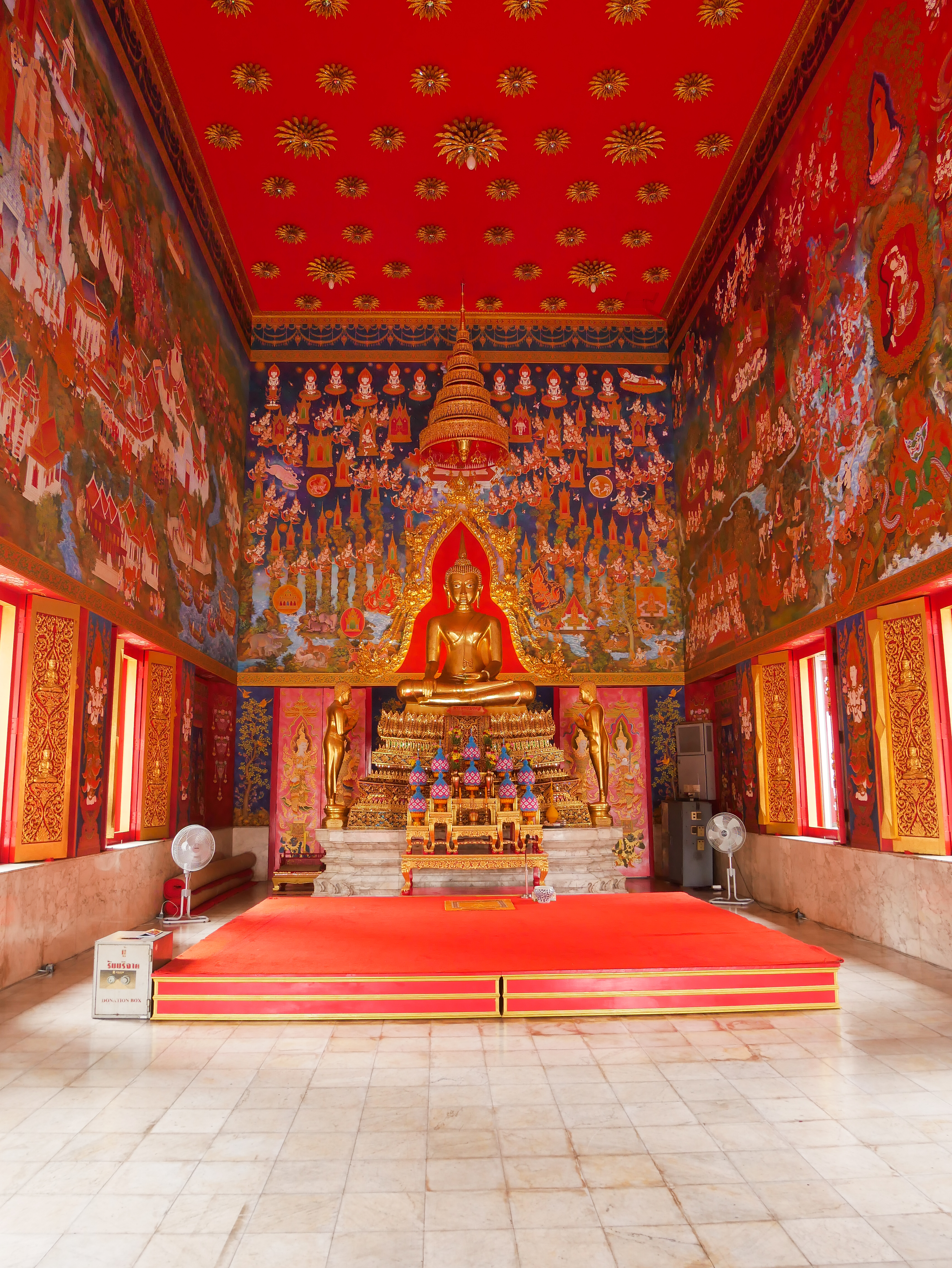
Main hall in Wat Phlapphla Chai

It was built in the time of King Borommakot judging from the shape of the main hall. The curved foundation is an outstanding architectural feature for that period. It looks like a Chinese junk, because it was said that the junk would float into heaven when the religion's followers gave alms. Unlike other temples, this hall has three doors. It was assumed that when King Borommakot built the main hall, he built the central entrance for himself and the other two, one on either side, were for vassals.

The pillars inside prove that this temple was built in the Ayutthaya period as the octagonal pillar with a lotus shape on the top was the normal pillar of that period. The lotus shape on top of these pillars was meant to dedicate them to Lord Buddha.

The most interesting thing about the main hall of Wat Phlapphla Chai is that it is also a place to store Nang yai (a kind of shadow play), like a museum. Nang yai hang on the walls of the surrounding hall. These shadow puppetries were created by Luang Pho Ritt, the temple abbot during King Rama V's reign. He was Khrua In Khong's disciple and was also a skilled Phetchaburi artisan. The Nang yai of Wat Phlapphla Chai were masterpieces and they were used in shadow performance to welcome King Rama V on his royal visit to Phetchaburi Province in the year 1910. Each piece of shadow puppetry is delicate and made by pure handcraft.

At present, Wat Phlapphla Chai is regarded as a place to preserve Nang Yai, just like Wat Khanon in Photharam District of the neighbouring Ratchaburi Province, which is considered to be one of only a few left in Thailand.

Wat Phlapphla Chai was also mentioned in Sunthorn Phu's poem when he travelled to Phetchaburi, in his travelogue titled "Nirat Mueang Phet" (นิราศเมืองเพชร, "journey to Phetchaburi").
