= Khlong Krachaeng =

Coordinates: 13.111116°N 99.943632°E

Khlong Krachaeng (Thai: คลองกระแชง, pronounced [kʰlɔ̄ːŋ kra˨˩.t͡ɕʰɛːŋ˧]) is a tambon (subdistrict) and neighbourhood in Mueang Phetchaburi District, Phetchaburi Province, Thailand.

== History ==
Its name Khlong Krachaeng literally translated as "canal of Krachaeng". Khlong Krachaeng is not the name of a canal, but rather the name of a path and community on the west bank of the Phetchaburi River in the area of Mueang Phetchaburi District.

For the word "Krachaeng" is a kind of boat roof made of bamboo. That is this community was named after the product, Krachaeng or boat roof, it made. The name of the path came afterward. Khlong Krachaeng was also the former name of Mueang Phetchaburi District.

== Geography ==
Khlong Krachaeng has a total area of 2 square kilometers (0.77 square miles). The east of the area is a lowland along the river bank. North of the subdistrict is a foothslope of Khao Phanom Khuad, and in the west is a footslope of Khao Sanon or Khao Mahai Sawan, the location of Phra Nakhon Khiri, the historical landmark of Phetchaburi Province.

== Administration ==
Khlong Krachaeng is under the administration of Phetchaburi Municipality as well as neighbouring Tha Rap.

== State of society ==
The condition of Khlong Krachaeng at present is considered a traditional riverside community similar to the Chanthaboon Waterfront Community of Chanthaburi Province. Some temple and many buildings still remain as beautiful as their former glory. They also reflect the way of life and pride of the Phetchaburi people in the past, including streets and walls decorated with stylish graffiti.

Moreover, Phetchaburi River that flows through this area is also the source of many ancient artifacts. These ancient artifacts are from different periods. Some items are sacred objects. The oldest objects are the bronze pots made in the Dvaravati period (about 1,500 years ago). The pattern on the pot is an old pattern, for example, the diamond shape and Mudwai (loop) patterns are popular patterns in Dvaravati period. Some of them are containers for palm jaggery, good stuff of Phetchaburi until the present. These jaggery containers disappeared when the train came to Phetchaburi, in the King Rama V's reign to be precise.
