= 2026 Thailand Semi-pro League =

4th season of the Thailand Semi-pro League

- Season: 2026
- Dates: 18 April 2026 – 7 June 2026
- Champions: MNK
- Promoted: TNSU Lampang (Northern region); Paknampho (Northern region); Esan Fighter (Northeastern region); Pitchaya Bundit College (Northeastern region); MNK (Eastern region); Banbueng (Eastern region); Ayutthaya PK (Central region); Bangkapi (Central region); Phetchaburi (Western region); Nara (Southern region); Yala City (Southern region)

The 2026 Thailand Semi-pro League is the fourth season of the Thailand Semi-pro League, serving as the official fourth tier of the Thai football league system. The league is organized by the Football Association of Thailand (FA Thailand) and managed by Thai League Co., Ltd.

A total of 53 clubs compete in the season, with each club required to meet the Semi-pro Club Licensing requirements. Admission is based on an application process conducted by the league organizers. The season began on 18 April 2026 and concluded on 7 June 2026 with the second leg of the Finals, where the national champion was crowned.

The competition consists of a Regional Stage followed by the Finals. The champions of the six regional zones earn automatic promotion to Thai League 3 for the following season. Following the conclusion of the Regional Stage, the six regional champions are ranked in accordance with the competition regulations, with the two highest-ranked clubs qualifying for the Finals.

A notable change for the 2026 season was the introduction of a league-phase scheduling system in the Regional Stage. Under this format, match fixtures are pre-generated through a computerized draw before clubs are assigned to their respective positions. Each club plays six matches, consisting of three home matches and three away matches, ensuring that all clubs play the same number of matches regardless of the number of participating clubs in each region.

== Stadiums and locations ==
=== Northern region ===
Team	Location	Stadium	Coordinates
Lomsak	Phetchabun (Lom Sak)	Lomsak FC Stadium	16°48′39″N 101°14′57″E
Nakhon Sawan	Nakhon Sawan (Mueang)	Nakhon Sawan Provincial Stadium	15°42′36″N 100°06′26″E
Paknampho	Nakhon Sawan (Mueang)	Stadium of Nakhon Sawan Sports School	15°44′33″N 100°07′56″E
Phetchabun	Phetchabun (Mueang)	Stadium of Thailand National Sports University, Phetchabun Campus	16°26′54″N 101°09′02″E
Phetpittayakom	Phetchabun (Mueang)	Phetchabun Provincial Stadium	16°26′57″N 101°09′53″E
Phrae	Phrae (Mueang)	Thunghong Subdistrict Municipality Stadium	18°10′31″N 100°10′16″E
Pibul United	Phitsanulok (Mueang)	Stadium of Pibulsongkram Rajabhat University	16°49′55″N 100°12′47″E
TNSU Lampang	Lampang (Mueang)	Lampang Provincial Stadium	18°18′09″N 99°28′25″E
Uwear Phitsanulok	Phitsanulok (Mueang)	Phitsanulok PAO. Stadium	16°50′48″N 100°15′51″E

=== Northeastern region ===
Team	Location	Stadium	Coordinates
Amnat Poly United	Amnat Charoen (Mueang)	Amnat Charoen Provincial Stadium	15°53′44″N 104°36′44″E
Esan Fighter	Udon Thani (Mueang)	Udon Thani SAT Stadium	17°26′54″N 102°54′59″E
Industrial Technology College Yasothon	Yasothon (Mueang)	Yasothon PAO. Stadium	15°46′58″N 104°09′06″E
Nakhon Phanom United	Nakhon Phanom (Mueang)	Stadium of Nakhon Phanom University	17°23′54″N 104°43′29″E
Pitchaya Bundit College	Nong Bua Lamphu (Mueang)	Pitchaya Stadium	17°11′52″N 102°26′00″E
Roi Et Alan	Roi Et (Mueang)	Roi Et Provincial Stadium	16°04′27″N 103°39′22″E
Sisaket City	Sisaket (Mueang)	Sisaket Provincial Stadium	15°05′21″N 104°19′25″E
Surindra	Surin (Mueang)	Sri Narong Stadium	14°52′30″N 103°29′50″E
Thailand National Sports University Chaiyaphum Campus	Chaiyaphum (Mueang)	Stadium of Thailand National Sports University, Chaiyaphum Campus	15°48′29″N 102°01′05″E
Vongchavalitkul University	Nakhon Ratchasima (Mueang)	Stadium of Vongchavalitkul University	15°00′14″N 102°06′50″E
Warin Chamrap	Ubon Ratchathani (Mueang)	Stadium of Ubon Ratchathani Rajabhat University	15°14′45″N 104°50′51″E

=== Eastern region ===
Team	Location	Stadium	Coordinates
Banbueng	Chonburi (Ban Bueng)	Chang Football Park	13°18′09″N 101°12′25″E
Bangsaen Saensuk	Chonburi (Si Racha)	Stadium of Rajamangala University of Technology Tawan-ok	13°13′39″N 100°57′29″E
Bankaeng United	Sa Kaeo (Mueang)	Sa Kaeo PAO. Stadium	13°46′21″N 102°10′43″E
Burapha Saensuk	Chonburi (Mueang)	Saensuk Town Municipality Stadium	13°18′05″N 100°55′22″E
Cilie	Chonburi (Si Racha)	Laem Chabang City Municipality Stadium	13°07′05″N 100°55′07″E
Hallelujah	Rayong (Pluak Daeng)	CK Stadium	12°59′06″N 101°12′52″E
Huasamrong Gateway	Chachoengsao (Mueang)	Chachoengsao Town Municipality Stadium	13°41′24″N 101°04′06″E
MNK	Chonburi (Si Racha)	Stadium of Rajamangala University of Technology Tawan-ok	13°13′39″N 100°57′29″E
Nakhon Nayok	Nakhon Nayok (Mueang)	Nakhon Nayok PAO. Stadium	14°12′52″N 101°10′45″E
Sriracha	Chonburi (Si Racha)	Si Racha Town Municipality Stadium	13°10′20″N 100°55′41″E

=== Central region ===
Team	Location	Stadium	Coordinates
Ayothaya Warrior	Phra Nakhon Si Ayutthaya (Sena)	Senabodee Stadium	14°19′59″N 100°24′18″E
Ayutthaya PK	Phra Nakhon Si Ayutthaya (Phra Nakhon Si Ayutthaya)	Stadium of Rajamangala University of Technology Suvarnabhumi, Huntra Campus	14°22′35″N 100°36′23″E
Bangkapi	Bangkok (Bang Kapi)	Stadium of Ramkhamhaeng University	13°45′16″N 100°37′00″E
Hornbill Junior	Chai Nat (Mueang)	Khao Plong Stadium	15°13′09″N 100°09′20″E
Muangmin United	Bangkok (Lat Krabang)	Stadium of King Mongkut's Institute of Technology Ladkrabang	13°43′49″N 100°46′20″E
Old Blood	Phra Nakhon Si Ayutthaya (Bang Sai)	Ratchakram Stadium	14°10′09″N 100°31′45″E
Pathum Thani	Pathum Thani (Thanyaburi)	Stadium of Rajamangala University of Technology Thanyaburi	14°02′06″N 100°43′23″E
Police Ladkrabang	Bangkok (Min Buri)	72nd Anniversary Stadium, Min Buri	13°48′08″N 100°47′28″E
Poma	Bangkok (Chatuchak)	Insee Chantarasatit Stadium	13°50′50″N 100°33′57″E
Pongnapha	Pathum Thani (Lam Luk Ka)	Dhupatemiya Stadium	13°57′04″N 100°37′30″E
Romklao United	Bangkok (Min Buri)	Stadium of Kasem Bundit University	13°48′06″N 100°44′06″E

=== Western region ===
Team	Location	Stadium	Coordinates
DPU	Phetchaburi (Tha Yang)	His Majesty the King's 80th Birthday Anniversary Stadium, Tha Yang Subdistrict Municipality	12°57′43″N 99°53′56″E
Karin United	Nakhon Pathom (Phutthamonthon)	Stadium of Suan Sunandha Rajabhat University, Nakhon Pathom Campus	13°52′05″N 100°16′12″E
Muangnont United	Bangkok (Lak Si)	Stadium of Metropolitan Waterworks Authority	13°52′59″N 100°33′09″E
Pharaohs Phetchaburi United	Phetchaburi (Tha Yang)	His Majesty the King's 80th Birthday Anniversary Stadium, Tha Yang Subdistrict Municipality	12°57′43″N 99°53′56″E
Phetchaburi	Phetchaburi (Mueang)	Stadium of Phetchaburi Rajabhat University	13°04′20″N 99°58′45″E
The Wall SSDC	Suphanburi (Sam Chuk)	Stadium of Rajamangala University of Technology Suvarnabhumi, Suphanburi Campus	14°43′06″N 100°06′33″E

=== Southern region ===
Team	Location	Stadium	Coordinates
Nara	Narathiwat (Mueang)	Narathiwat PAO. Stadium	6°25′31″N 101°48′23″E
Phang Nga United	Phang Nga (Mueang)	Phang Nga Provincial Stadium	8°26′59″N 98°32′09″E
Phatthalung	Phatthalung (Mueang)	Phatthalung PAO. Stadium	7°37′00″N 100°02′55″E
Phuket United	Phuket (Mueang)	Surakul Stadium	7°53′20″N 98°22′19″E
Surat Thani Rajabhat University	Surat Thani (Mueang)	Stadium of Prince of Songkla University, Surat Thani Campus	9°05′39″N 99°21′32″E
Yala City	Yala (Mueang)	Stadium of Yala Rajabhat University	6°33′03″N 101°17′30″E

== Regional stage ==
The league continues to be divided into six regional zones, following the structure of Thai League 3. The number of participating clubs in each region varies according to club licensing approval; however, the competition format is standardized across all regions for the 2026 season. In the Regional Stage, a league-phase format is used. Match pairings are predetermined through a computerized draw, with each position assigned a fixed schedule of opponents comprising three home matches and three away matches. Clubs are subsequently drawn into these positions, which determine their fixture schedule for the season. Each club plays a total of six matches. Unlike previous seasons, all regions follow the same competition format, ensuring that every club plays the same number of matches regardless of the number of participating clubs in its region. At the conclusion of the Regional Stage, the top-ranked club in each region is crowned regional champion and earns promotion to Thai League 3 for the following season. The six regional champions are then ranked according to the competition regulations based on their Regional Stage records, with the two highest-ranked clubs qualifying for the Finals to compete for the national championship.

=== Northern region ===
League table

Pos	Team	Pld	W	D	L	GF	GA	GD	Pts	Promotion or qualification
1	TNSU Lampang (C, P)	6	5	0	1	8	3	+5	15	Promotion to 2026–27 Thai League 3
2	Paknampho (P)	6	4	2	0	12	3	+9	14 (Note: Points, goal difference, goals scored, and wins are tied; Paknampho ranks ahead on away wins (Paknampho 3, Phetchabun 1).)	Promotion to 2026–27 Thai League 3
3	Phetchabun	6	4	2	0	12	3	+9	14	
4	Phetpittayakom	6	2	2	2	4	5	−1	8	
5	Lomsak	6	2	1	3	8	9	−1	7	
6	Nakhon Sawan	6	2	1	3	8	11	−3	7	
7	Pibul United	6	1	1	4	9	11	−2	4	
8	Phrae	6	1	1	4	7	18	−11	4	
9	Uwear Phitsanulok	6	1	0	5	4	9	−5	3	

Source: Thai League
Rules for classification: 1) Points; 2) Goal difference; 3) Goals scored; 4) Wins; 5) Away wins; 6) Away goals scored; 7) Fair play points; 8) Drawing of lots.
(C) Champions; (P) Promoted
Notes:

Results

Home \ Away	LSK	NSW	PNP	PBN	PPK	PHR	PBU	TSL	UPL
Lomsak	—	—	2–3	1–3	—	—	—	—	1–0
Nakhon Sawan	—	—	—	—	0–1	—	5–4	0–1	—
Paknampho	—	0–0	—	0–0	—	6–0	—	—	—
Phetchabun	—	3–0	—	—	—	3–1	—	2–0	—
Phetpittayakom	0–0	—	—	—	—	—	2–1	—	0–1
Phrae	2–4	—	—	—	1–1	—	—	1–3	—
Pibul United	—	—	1–2	1–1	—	—	—	—	2–0
TNSU Lampang	1–0	—	—	—	2–0	—	1–0	—	—
Uwear Phitsanulok	—	2–3	0–1	—	—	1–2	—	—	—

Source: Thai League
Legend: Blue = home team win; Yellow = draw; Red = away team win.
For upcoming matches, an "a" indicates there is an article about the rivalry between the two participants.

=== Northeastern region ===
League table

Pos	Team	Pld	W	D	L	GF	GA	GD	Pts	Promotion or qualification
1	Esan Fighter (C, P)	6	5	0	1	23	6	+17	15	Promotion to 2026–27 Thai League 3
2	Pitchaya Bundit College (P)	6	5	0	1	21	4	+17	15	Promotion to 2026–27 Thai League 3
3	Sisaket City	6	5	0	1	19	4	+15	15	
4	Warin Chamrap	6	3	2	1	11	4	+7	11	
5	Roi Et Alan	6	3	1	2	13	10	+3	10	
6	Surindra	6	3	1	2	13	13	0	10	
7	Vongchavalitkul University	6	2	2	2	6	6	0	8	
8	Amnat Poly United	6	2	0	4	5	15	−10	6	
9	Nakhon Phanom United	6	0	2	4	5	13	−8	2	
10	Industrial Technology College Yasothon	6	0	2	4	6	18	−12	2	
11	Thailand National Sports University Chaiyaphum Campus	6	0	0	6	4	33	−29	0	

Source: Thai League
Rules for classification: 1) Points; 2) Goal difference; 3) Goals scored; 4) Wins; 5) Away wins; 6) Away goals scored; 7) Fair play points; 8) Drawing of lots.
(C) Champions; (P) Promoted

Results

Home \ Away	APU	ESF	ICY	NPN	PBC	REA	SKC	SRD	TSC	VCU	WRC
Amnat Poly United	—	—	—	—	—	1–3	0–4	—	—	0–1	—
Esan Fighter	—	—	3–2	6–1	—	2–1	—	—	—	—	—
Industrial Technology College Yasothon	—	—	—	1–1	—	—	—	2–4	—	1–1	—
Nakhon Phanom United	0–1	—	—	—	—	—	—	1–2	—	—	0–0
Pitchaya Bundit College	6–0	—	—	—	—	—	—	3–0	8–0	—	—
Roi Et Alan	—	—	—	—	3–0	—	0–2	—	3–2	—	—
Sisaket City	—	—	7–0	—	1–3	—	—	—	4–1	—	—
Surindra	—	2–1	—	—	—	3–3	—	—	—	—	2–3
Thailand National Sports University Chaiyaphum Campus	1–3	0–10	—	—	—	—	—	—	—	—	0–5
Vongchavalitkul University	—	0–1	—	3–2	0–1	—	—	—	—	—	—
Warin Chamrap	—	—	2–0	—	—	—	0–1	—	—	1–1	—

Source: Thai League
Legend: Blue = home team win; Yellow = draw; Red = away team win.
For upcoming matches, an "a" indicates there is an article about the rivalry between the two participants.

=== Eastern region ===
League table

Pos	Team	Pld	W	D	L	GF	GA	GD	Pts	Promotion or qualification
1	MNK (C, P, Q)	6	6	0	0	13	0	+13	18	Promotion to 2026–27 Thai League 3 and qualification to the Finals
2	Banbueng (P)	6	5	0	1	22	3	+19	15	Promotion to 2026–27 Thai League 3
3	Huasamrong Gateway	6	5	0	1	16	9	+7	15	
4	Bankaeng United	6	4	0	2	13	10	+3	12	
5	Hallelujah	6	3	1	2	11	7	+4	10	
6	Sriracha	6	3	0	3	17	9	+8	9	
7	Nakhon Nayok	6	1	1	4	6	15	−9	4	
8	Cilie	6	1	0	5	8	25	−17	3	
9	Bangsaen Saensuk	6	0	2	4	7	22	−15	2	
10	Burapha Saensuk	6	0	0	6	8	21	−13	0	

Source: Thai League
Rules for classification: 1) Points; 2) Goal difference; 3) Goals scored; 4) Wins; 5) Away wins; 6) Away goals scored; 7) Fair play points; 8) Drawing of lots.
(C) Champions; (P) Promoted; (Q) Qualified for the phase indicated

Results

Home \ Away	BBG	BSN	BKG	BPS	CLE	HLJ	HGW	MNK	NNY	SRC
Banbueng	—	—	—	—	9–1	2–0	—	0–1	—	—
Bangsaen Saensuk	0–6	—	1–3	—	—	—	—	—	—	1–6
Bankaeng United	—	—	—	2–1	3–0	—	2–4	—	—	—
Burapha Saensuk	0–3	—	—	—	—	2–4	—	—	—	2–7
Cilie	—	5–3	—	—	—	1–3	—	0–3	—	—
Hallelujah	—	0–0	—	—	—	—	—	—	3–0	1–2
Huasamrong Gateway	—	—	—	3–2	4–1	—	—	—	3–1	—
MNK	—	—	3–0	—	—	—	2–0	—	3–0	—
Nakhon Nayok	—	2–2	1–3	2–1	—	—	—	—	—	—
Sriracha	1–2	—	—	—	—	—	1–2	0–1	—	—

Source: Thai League
Legend: Blue = home team win; Yellow = draw; Red = away team win.
For upcoming matches, an "a" indicates there is an article about the rivalry between the two participants.

=== Central region ===
League table

Pos	Team	Pld	W	D	L	GF	GA	GD	Pts	Promotion or qualification
1	Ayutthaya PK (C, P, Q)	6	6	0	0	15	4	+11	18	Promotion to 2026–27 Thai League 3 and qualification to the Finals
2	Bangkapi (P)	6	4	2	0	9	3	+6	14	Promotion to 2026–27 Thai League 3
3	Pathum Thani	6	4	1	1	19	4	+15	13	
4	Romklao United	6	3	2	1	8	3	+5	11	
5	Hornbill Junior	6	2	3	1	16	9	+7	9	
6	Old Blood	6	2	1	3	10	14	−4	7	
7	Ayothaya Warrior	6	2	0	4	6	10	−4	6	
8	Pongnapha	6	2	0	4	6	11	−5	6	
9	Poma	6	1	1	4	3	11	−8	4	
10	Muangmin United	6	1	0	5	9	20	−11	3	
11	Police Ladkrabang	6	0	2	4	7	19	−12	2	

Source: Thai League
Rules for classification: 1) Points; 2) Goal difference; 3) Goals scored; 4) Wins; 5) Away wins; 6) Away goals scored; 7) Fair play points; 8) Drawing of lots.
(C) Champions; (P) Promoted; (Q) Qualified for the phase indicated

Results

Home \ Away	AYW	AYP	BKP	HBJ	MMU	OBD	PTM	PLL	PMA	PPA	RKU
Ayothaya Warrior	—	—	—	—	1–2	—	0–4	—	—	0–1	—
Ayutthaya PK	—	—	—	2–0	—	—	2–1	3–1	—	—	—
Bangkapi	1–0	—	—	—	—	1–1	—	4–1	—	—	—
Hornbill Junior	—	—	1–1	—	6–1	5–1	—	—	—	—	—
Muangmin United	—	—	—	—	—	—	—	—	1–2	3–5	0–1
Old Blood	—	2–3	—	—	—	—	—	—	3–0	—	0–3
Pathum Thani	—	—	—	—	5–2	—	—	6–0	—	3–0	—
Police Ladkrabang	—	—	—	3–3	—	2–3	—	—	0–0	—	—
Poma	1–3	0–3	0–1	—	—	—	—	—	—	—	—
Pongnapha	—	0–2	0–1	—	—	—	—	—	—	—	0–2
Romklao United	1–2	—	—	1–1	—	—	0–0	—	—	—	—

Source: Thai League
Legend: Blue = home team win; Yellow = draw; Red = away team win.
For upcoming matches, an "a" indicates there is an article about the rivalry between the two participants.

=== Western region ===
League table

Pos	Team	Pld	W	D	L	GF	GA	GD	Pts	Promotion or qualification
1	Phetchaburi (C, P)	6	3	3	0	9	3	+6	12	Promotion to 2026–27 Thai League 3
2	DPU	6	3	2	1	12	6	+6	11	
3	Karin United	6	3	1	2	6	6	0	10	
4	The Wall SSDC	6	2	2	2	8	9	−1	8	
5	Muangnont United	6	1	1	4	7	10	−3	4	
6	Pharaohs Phetchaburi United	6	1	1	4	6	14	−8	4	

Source: Thai League
Rules for classification: 1) Points; 2) Goal difference; 3) Goals scored; 4) Wins; 5) Away wins; 6) Away goals scored; 7) Fair play points; 8) Drawing of lots.
(C) Champions; (P) Promoted

Results

Home \ Away	DPU	KRU	MNU	PRP	PET	WAL
DPU	—	1–3	3–0	2–2	—	—
Karin United	—	—	1–0	2–1	0–2	—
Muangnont United	—	—	—	3–0	1–2	1–2
Pharaohs Phetchaburi United	0–3	—	—	—	0–3	3–1
Phetchaburi	1–1	0–0	—	—	—	1–1
The Wall SSDC	0–2	2–0	2–2	—	—	—

Source: Thai League
Legend: Blue = home team win; Yellow = draw; Red = away team win.
For upcoming matches, an "a" indicates there is an article about the rivalry between the two participants.

Note:

- Pharaohs Phetchaburi United failed to appear for the match against Phetchaburi on 9 May 2026 and were subsequently handed a 0–3 forfeit defeat.
- Pharaohs Phetchaburi United failed to appear for the match against Muangnont United on 17 May 2026 and were subsequently handed a 0–3 forfeit defeat.
- Pharaohs Phetchaburi United failed to appear for the match against DPU on 23 May 2026 and were subsequently handed a 0–3 forfeit defeat.

=== Southern region ===
League table

Pos	Team	Pld	W	D	L	GF	GA	GD	Pts	Promotion or qualification
1	Nara (C, P)	6	4	1	1	11	5	+6	13	Promotion to 2026–27 Thai League 3
2	Yala City (P)	6	4	0	2	12	8	+4	12	Promotion to 2026–27 Thai League 3
3	Phatthalung	6	3	2	1	11	6	+5	11	
4	Surat Thani Rajabhat University	6	3	1	2	7	5	+2	10	
5	Phuket United	6	1	2	3	5	8	−3	5	
6	Phang Nga United	6	0	0	6	7	21	−14	0	

Source: Thai League
Rules for classification: 1) Points; 2) Goal difference; 3) Goals scored; 4) Wins; 5) Away wins; 6) Away goals scored; 7) Fair play points; 8) Drawing of lots.
(C) Champions; (P) Promoted

Results

Home \ Away	NRA	PNA	PLG	PKU	SRU	YLC
Nara	—	2–1	—	1–0	—	1–2
Phang Nga United	1–5	—	1–4	—	0–2	—
Phatthalung	1–1	—	—	—	2–0	3–2
Phuket United	—	2–1	1–1	—	2–2	—
Surat Thani Rajabhat University	0–1	—	—	2–0	—	1–0
Yala City	—	6–3	1–0	1–0	—	—

Source: Thai League
Legend: Blue = home team win; Yellow = draw; Red = away team win.
For upcoming matches, an "a" indicates there is an article about the rivalry between the two participants.

== Ranking of regional champions ==
Following the completion of the Regional Stage, the six regional champions are ranked according to the competition regulations based on their results from the Regional Stage. The two highest-ranked clubs qualify for the Finals.

Pos	Reg	Team	Pld	W	D	L	GF	GA	GD	Pts	Qualification
1	Eastern	MNK	6	6	0	0	13	0	+13	18	Advance to the Finals
2	Central	Ayutthaya PK	6	6	0	0	15	4	+11	18	Advance to the Finals
3	Northeastern	Esan Fighter	6	5	0	1	23	6	+17	15	
4	Northern	TNSU Lampang	6	5	0	1	8	3	+5	15	
5	Southern	Nara	6	4	1	1	11	5	+6	13	
6	Western	Phetchaburi	6	3	3	0	9	3	+6	12	

Source: Thai League
Rules for classification: 1) Points; 2) Goal difference; 3) Goals scored; 4) Wins; 5) Away wins; 6) Away goals scored; 7) Fair play points; 8) Drawing of lots.

== Finals ==
The Finals are contested by the two highest-ranked regional champions and are played over two legs on a home-and-away basis. The winner on aggregate is crowned the Thailand Semi-pro League champion for the 2026 season.

=== Summary ===
Team 1	Agg.	Team 2	1st leg	2nd leg
Ayutthaya PK	1–3	MNK	0–0	1–3

=== Matches ===
==== 1st leg ====
31 May 2026
16:00 UTC+7
Finals 1st leg

Ayutthaya PK	0–0	MNK
	Report

Stadium of Rajamangala University of Technology Suvarnabhumi, Huntra Campus,
Phra Nakhon Si Ayutthaya, Phra Nakhon Si Ayutthaya
Referee: Saravut Suksalee (Thailand)

Ayutthaya PK	MNK

Lineups:
GK	36	(Thailand) Natthawut Tharapon
RB	25	(Thailand) Treeraphat Somwan
CB	6	(Thailand) Aekkarat Buarin (c)	(yellow card) 44'
CB	3	(Thailand) Pattarapon Boonmee
LB	21	(Thailand) Mekin Wae-u-seng
CM	28	(Thailand) Sattawat Munprasit		(substituted off) 46'
CM	8	(Thailand) Nuttapol Srisamutr
AM	13	(Thailand) Theppatat Wantanaboon
RF	29	(Thailand) Krungthep Chaweepak		(substituted off) 46'
CF	14	(Thailand) Keattisak Sanitkham		(substituted off) 71'
LF	7	(Thailand) Manop Kittiphirun
Substitutes:
GK	1	(Thailand) Ratchataphoom Sornchaiyat
DF	15	(Thailand) Krittamaeth Khwanyou
DF	22	(Thailand) Arkom Namnork
DF	65	(Thailand) Siriwat Bumee
MF	18	(Thailand) Natthapol Phiwpherk
MF	20	(Thailand) Powirit Nante		(substituted on) 71'
MF	23	(Thailand) Wuttipong Phlaikaew
MF	26	(Thailand) Auttawit Kerusai
MF	77	(Thailand) Weerakorn Janyalikit	(yellow card) 89'	(substituted on) 46'
FW	9	(Thailand) Satang Jantawong		(substituted on) 46'
FW	11	(Thailand) Chutchaphong Yutthakosa
FW	31	(Thailand) Phanuwat Sombatdee
Head Coach:
(Thailand) Weerachai Junsod

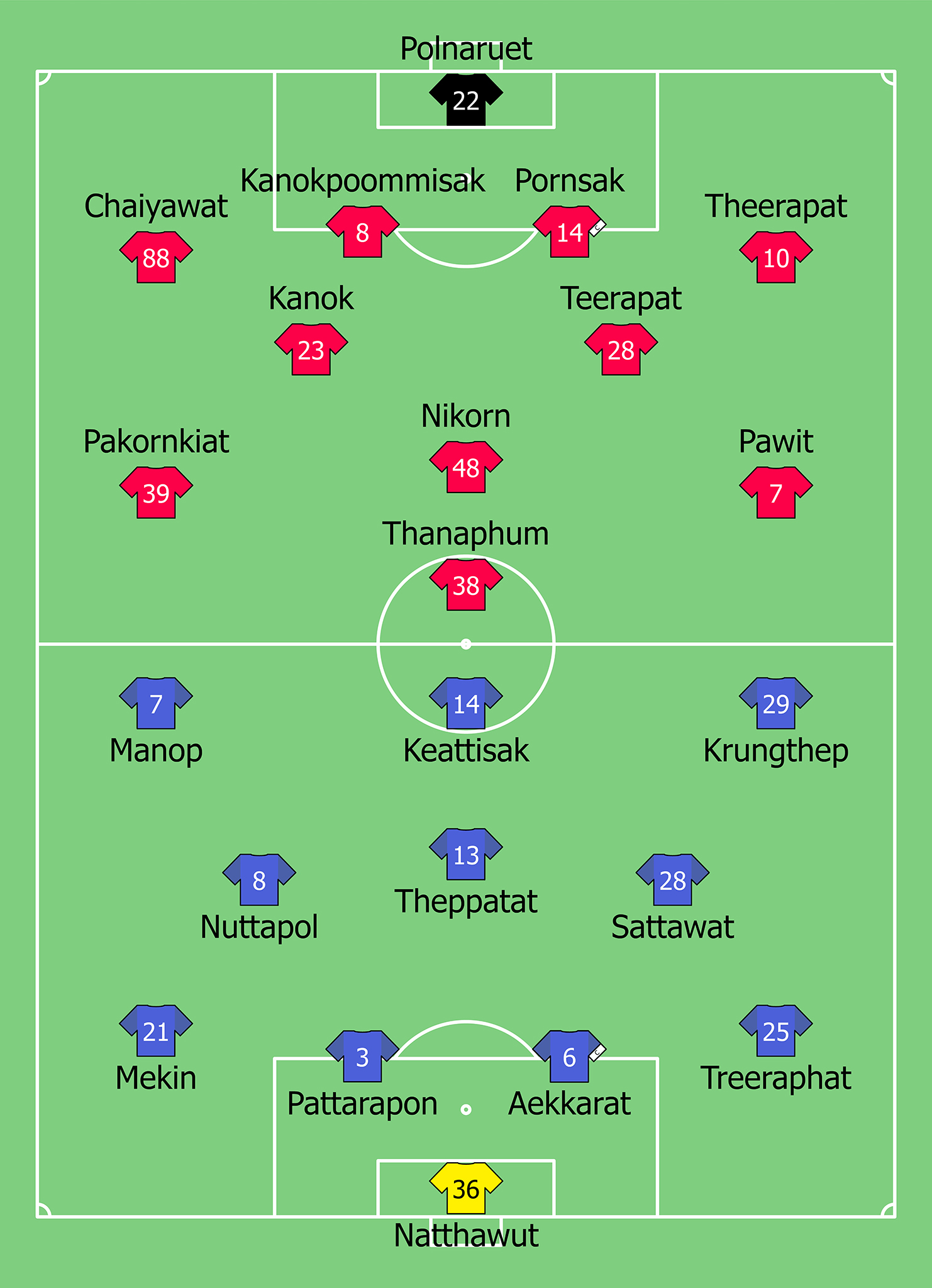

Lineups:
GK	22	(Thailand) Polnaruet Sudta
RB	88	(Thailand) Chaiyawat Thungkrathok
CB	8	(Thailand) Kanokpoommisak Waingsonsirikul	(yellow card) 44'
CB	14	(Thailand) Pornsak Pongthong (c)		(substituted off) 34'
LB	10	(Thailand) Theerapat Theerachotsakun
DM	23	(Thailand) Kanok Tapsai
DM	28	(Thailand) Teerapat Sinudomwongsa
RM	39	(Thailand) Pakornkiat Thumthon		(substituted off) 77'
AM	48	(Thailand) Nikorn Anuwan
LM	7	(Thailand) Pawit Koedphon
CF	38	(Thailand) Thanaphum Ruangchun
Substitutes:
GK	36	(Thailand) Chanathip Waiyaket
DF	12	(Thailand) Kanokthep Srinet
DF	18	(Thailand) Manoon Suttilor
DF	43	(Thailand) Saengarun Kulpaet
DF	74	(Thailand) Suphasit Premchat	(yellow card) 63'	(substituted on) 34'
MF	16	(Thailand) Panupon Karnwicha
MF	30	(Thailand) Chokchai Sukthed
MF	78	(Thailand) Siraphob Pannangrong		(substituted on) 77'
MF	99	(Thailand) Kantaphong Saenpa
FW	6	(Thailand) Prasopchok Khiwram
Head Coach:
(Thailand) Nikorn Anuwan

==== 2nd leg ====
7 June 2026
15:30 UTC+7
Finals 2nd leg

MNK	3–1	Ayutthaya PK
Pawit Koedphon 46'; Thanaphum Ruangchun 53'; Kanok Tapsai 68'	Report	Satang Jantawong 67'

Stadium of Rajamangala University of Technology Tawan-ok,
Si Racha, Chonburi
Attendance: 300
Referee: Nararit Srivorakul (Thailand)

MNK	Ayutthaya PK

Lineups:
GK	22	(Thailand) Polnaruet Sudta
RB	88	(Thailand) Chaiyawat Thungkrathok
CB	8	(Thailand) Kanokpoommisak Waingsonsirikul		(yellow card) 54'
CB	44	(Thailand) Rittichai Thobpuak			(substituted off) 90+4'
LB	10	(Thailand) Theerapat Theerachotsakun (c)
RM	39	(Thailand) Pakornkiat Thumthon			(substituted off) 90+2'
CM	30	(Thailand) Chokchai Sukthed		(yellow card) 80'	(substituted off) 83'
CM	23	(Thailand) Kanok Tapsai	68'
LM	7	(Thailand) Pawit Koedphon	46'
CF	21	(Thailand) Alongkorn Nuekmai
CF	38	(Thailand) Thanaphum Ruangchun	53'
Substitutes:
GK	36	(Thailand) Chanathip Waiyaket
DF	12	(Thailand) Kanokthep Srinet			(substituted on) 90+4'
DF	18	(Thailand) Manoon Suttilor
DF	43	(Thailand) Saengarun Kulpaet
DF	74	(Thailand) Suphasit Premchat
MF	16	(Thailand) Panupon Karnwicha			(substituted on) 90+2'
MF	17	(Thailand) Kittichai Ainthong
MF	28	(Thailand) Teerapat Sinudomwongsa			(substituted on) 83'
MF	99	(Thailand) Kantaphong Saenpa
FW	6	(Thailand) Prasopchok Khiwram
FW	11	(Thailand) Pitiphat Janhom
FW	48	(Thailand) Nikorn Anuwan
Head Coach:
(Thailand) Nikorn Anuwan

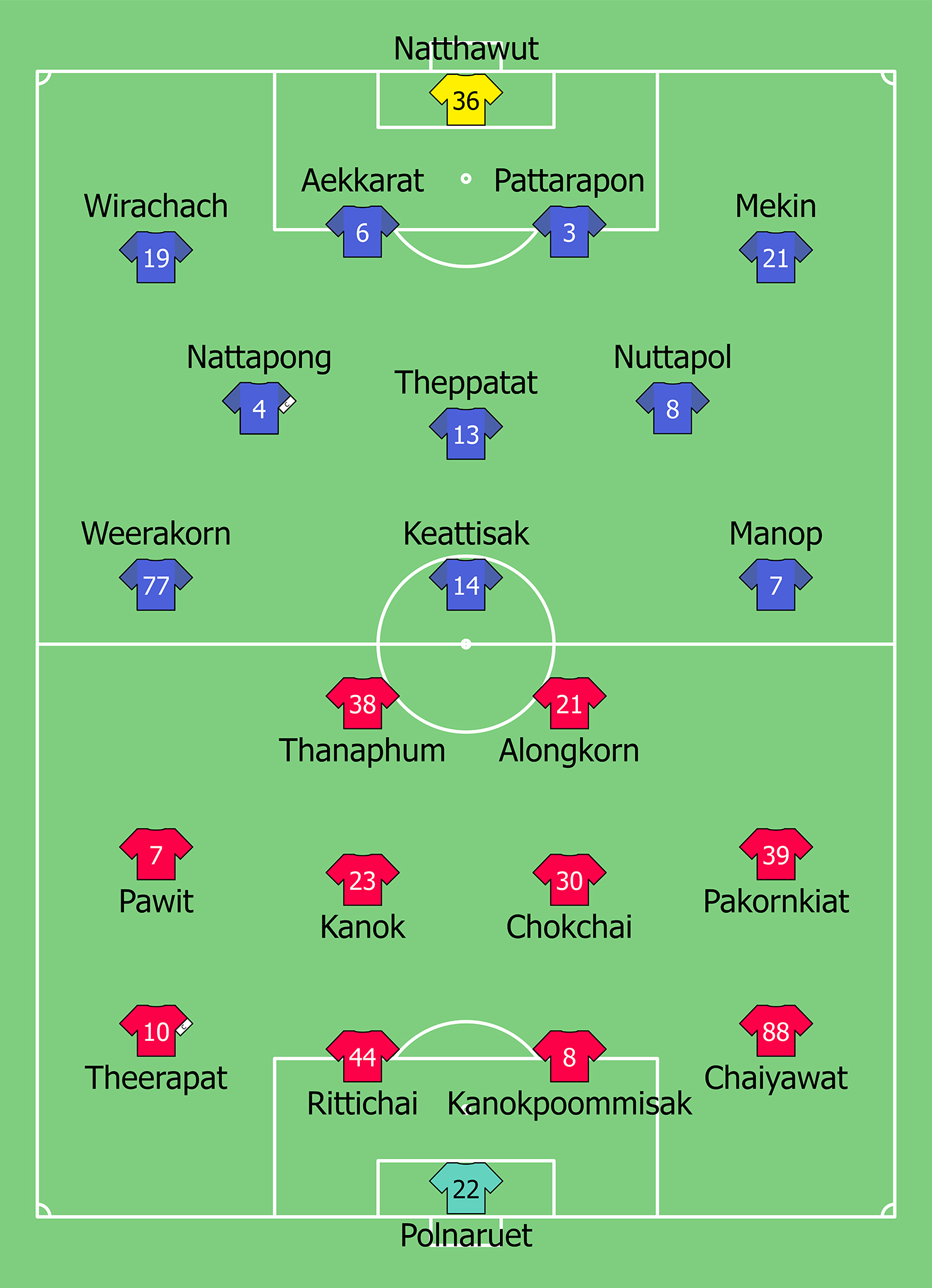

Lineups:
GK	36	(Thailand) Natthawut Tharapon
RB	19	(Thailand) Wirachach Umtum			(substituted off) 64'
CB	6	(Thailand) Aekkarat Buarin
CB	3	(Thailand) Pattarapon Boonmee		(yellow card) 41'	(substituted off) 83'
LB	21	(Thailand) Mekin Wae-u-seng
CM	4	(Thailand) Nattapong Karuna (c)		(yellow card) 45'
CM	8	(Thailand) Nuttapol Srisamutr		(yellow card) 35'
AM	13	(Thailand) Theppatat Wantanaboon
RF	77	(Thailand) Weerakorn Janyalikit			(substituted off) 73'
CF	14	(Thailand) Keattisak Sanitkham			(substituted off) 64'
LF	7	(Thailand) Manop Kittiphirun
Substitutes:
GK	1	(Thailand) Ratchataphoom Sornchaiyat
DF	15	(Thailand) Krittamaeth Khwanyou			(substituted on) 83'
DF	25	(Thailand) Treeraphat Somwan		(yellow card) 90+5'	(substituted on) 64'
DF	65	(Thailand) Siriwat Bumee
MF	18	(Thailand) Natthapol Phiwpherk
MF	20	(Thailand) Powirit Nante
MF	23	(Thailand) Wuttipong Phlaikaew
MF	28	(Thailand) Sattawat Munprasit
FW	9	(Thailand) Satang Jantawong	67'		(substituted on) 64'
FW	11	(Thailand) Chutchaphong Yutthakosa			(substituted on) 73'
FW	29	(Thailand) Krungthep Chaweepak
FW	31	(Thailand) Phanuwat Sombatdee
Head Coach:
(Thailand) Weerachai Junsod

MNK won 3–1 on aggregate.

== See also ==
- 2025–26 Thai League 1
- 2025–26 Thai League 2
- 2025–26 Thai League 3
- 2025–26 Thai League 3 Northern Region
- 2025–26 Thai League 3 Central Region
- 2025–26 Thai League 3 Northeastern Region
- 2025–26 Thai League 3 Eastern Region
- 2025–26 Thai League 3 Western Region
- 2025–26 Thai League 3 Southern Region
- 2025–26 Thai League 3 National Championship
- 2025–26 Thai FA Cup
- 2025–26 Thai League Cup
- 2025–26 Thai League 3 Cup
