= 2026–27 Thai League 3 Northern Region =

Thai League 3 Northern Region
- Season: 2026–27
- Dates: 19 September 2026 – 20 March 2027

The 2026–27 Thai League 3 Northern Region was part of the 2026–27 Thai League 3 Regional Stage, consisting of 12 clubs located across the northern region of Thailand, including some areas in the upper parts of the central and western regions. The season commenced on 19 September 2026, with clubs competing in a round-robin format featuring home-and-away matches. The Regional Stage concluded on 20 March 2027, with the top two clubs advancing to the National Championship Stage, while the bottom-placed club was relegated to the Thailand Semi-pro League for the following season.

== Seasonal Changes ==
The 2026–27 Thai League 3 Northern Region retains 12 clubs, unchanged from the previous season. BYD Auto remains the title sponsor, with matches broadcast on AIS Play. The criteria for determining the standings have also been revised, with overall goal difference replacing head-to-head results as the primary tiebreaker.

=== Promotions from Thailand Semi-pro League ===
The following two clubs were promoted from the 2026 Thailand Semi-pro League to the 2026–27 Thai League 3 Northern Region:

- TNSU Lampang – promoted as regional champions.
- Paknampho – promoted as runners-up under a special quota.

=== Promotion to Thai League 2 ===
Uttaradit was promoted to the 2026–27 Thai League 2 as the runners-up of the 2025–26 Thai League 3 National Championship Stage.

=== Relegation to Thailand Semi-pro League ===
Nakhon Sawan See Khwae City was relegated to the 2027 Thailand Semi-pro League after finishing bottom of the 2025–26 Thai League 3 Northern Region.

=== Club name and logo changes ===
Chiangrai TSC introduced a new club logo for the 2026–27 season, replacing the previous design with a red-and-gold shield featuring four emblematic elements and a central banner bearing the club's name, "CHIANGRAI TSC FC".

== Teams ==
=== Number of teams by province ===
Position	Province	Number	Teams
1	Chiang Mai	2	Chiangmai and Maejo United
1	Chiang Rai	2	Chiangrai City and Chiangrai TSC
1	Lampang	2	Khelang United and TNSU Lampang
1	Phitsanulok	2	Chattrakan City and Phitsanulok
5	Kamphaeng Phet	1	Kamphaengphet
5	Nakhon Sawan	1	Paknampho
5	Phichit	1	Phichit United
5	Tak	1	Northern Nakhon Mae Sot United

=== Stadiums and locations ===
Team	Location	Stadium	Coordinates
Chattrakan City	Phitsanulok (Mueang)	Stadium of Pibulsongkram Rajabhat University	16°49′55″N 100°12′47″E
Chiangmai	Chiang Mai (Mueang)	Chiangmai Municipal Stadium	18°48′03″N 98°59′22″E
Chiangrai City	Chiang Rai (Mueang)	Singha Chiangrai Stadium	19°57′25″N 99°52′29″E
Chiangrai TSC	Chiang Rai (Mueang)	Chiangrai Provincial Stadium	19°54′48″N 99°51′21″E
Kamphaengphet	Kamphaengphet (Mueang)	Cha Kung Rao Stadium	16°28′40″N 99°31′17″E
Khelang United	Lampang (Mueang)	Stadium of Lampang Rajabhat University	18°14′07″N 99°29′22″E
Maejo United	Chiang Mai (Doi Saket)	Stadium of Rajamangala University of Technology Lanna, Doi Saket Campus	18°51′28″N 99°10′39″E
Northern Nakhon Mae Sot United	Tak (Mae Sot)	Five Border Districts Stadium	16°44′07″N 98°33′52″E
Paknampho	Nakhon Sawan (Mueang)	Stadium of Nakhon Sawan Sports School	15°44′33″N 100°07′56″E
Phichit United	Phichit (Mueang)	Phichit Stadium	16°26′35″N 100°19′26″E
Phitsanulok	Phitsanulok (Mueang)	Phitsanulok PAO Stadium	16°50′48″N 100°15′51″E
TNSU Lampang	Lampang (Mueang)	Lampang Provincial Stadium	18°18′09″N 99°28′25″E

=== Foreign players ===
A T3 team can register 3 foreign players from around the world. A team can field 3 foreign players in each game.

== League table ==
=== Standings ===
Pos	Team	Pld	W	D	L	GF	GA	GD	Pts	Qualification or relegation
1	Chiangmai	9	7	2	0	20	4	+16	23	Qualification to the National Championship stage
2	Maejo United	9	7	2	0	18	3	+15	23	Qualification to the National Championship stage
3	Phichit United	9	7	2	0	24	10	+14	23	
4	Phitsanulok	9	7	1	1	26	9	+17	22	
5	Chattrakan City	9	4	1	4	20	15	+5	13	
6	TNSU Lampang	9	4	0	5	13	21	−8	12	
7	Kamphaengphet	9	2	3	4	13	19	−6	9	
8	Northern Nakhon Mae Sot United	9	2	2	5	13	18	−5	8	
9	Chiangrai TSC	9	1	4	4	9	18	−9	7	
10	Khelang United	9	1	2	6	4	15	−11	5	
11	Chiangrai City	9	1	1	7	10	24	−14	4	
12	Paknampho	9	0	2	7	4	18	−14	2	Relegation to the Thailand Semi-pro League

Updated to match(es) played on 15 November 2026. Source: Thai League
Rules for classification: 1) Points; 2) Overall goal difference; 3) Overall goals scored; 4) Head-to-head points; 5) Head-to-head goal difference; 6) Head-to-head goals scored; 7) Fair play points.

=== Positions by round ===
Team ╲ Round	1	2	3	4	5	6	7	8	9	10	11	12	13	14	15	16	17	18	19	20	21	22
Chiangmai	6	3	2	1	1	1	1	1	1													
Maejo United	5	1	1	2	2	2	3	3	2													
Phichit United	3	2	3	3	3	3	2	2	3													
Phitsanulok	1	4	7	5	5	4	4	4	4													
Chattrakan City	9	6	6	4	4	5	6	5	5													
TNSU Lampang	10	7	5	7	6	6	5	6	6													
Kamphaengphet	2	8	4	6	7	7	7	7	7													
Northern Nakhon Mae Sot United	4	5	8	9	9	9	8	8	8													
Chiangrai TSC	7	9	9	8	8	8	9	9	9													
Khelang United	8	12	12	11	11	11	11	10	10													
Chiangrai City	12	10	10	12	12	12	12	12	11													
Paknampho	11	11	11	10	10	10	10	11	12													

Source: Thai League
= Qualification to the National Championship stage; = Relegation to the Thailand Semi-pro League

=== Results by round ===
Team ╲ Round	1	2	3	4	5	6	7	8	9	10	11	12	13	14	15	16	17	18	19	20	21	22
Chiangmai	D	W	W	W	W	W	D	W	W													
Maejo United	W	W	W	D	W	W	D	W	W													
Phichit United	W	W	D	D	W	W	W	W	W													
Phitsanulok	W	D	L	W	W	W	W	W	W													
Chattrakan City	L	W	D	W	W	L	L	W	L													
TNSU Lampang	L	W	W	L	W	L	W	L	L													
Kamphaengphet	W	L	W	D	L	L	D	D	L													
Northern Nakhon Mae Sot United	W	D	L	L	L	L	W	D	L													
Chiangrai TSC	D	L	W	D	L	D	D	L	L													
Khelang United	L	L	L	D	L	D	L	L	W													
Chiangrai City	L	L	L	L	L	D	L	L	W													
Paknampho	L	L	L	D	L	D	L	L	L													

Source: Thai League
W = Won; D = Drawn; L = Lost

=== Results ===
Home \ Away	CTC	CMI	CRC	CRT	KPP	KLU	MJU	NMS	PNP	PCU	PLK	TSL
Chattrakan City	—		5–1	1–0		6–0					0–1	
Chiangmai		—			3–0		0–0	2–1	4–0		4–2	
Chiangrai City		0–1	—				0–1		1–0	2–3		2–4
Chiangrai TSC		1–1	2–2	—	1–1	0–0						
Kamphaengphet	3–1				—			2–2	1–1	1–4		
Khelang United		0–1			1–3	—					0–1	
Maejo United	5–0				3–0	1–0	—	2–0		2–2		1–0
Northern Nakhon Mae Sot United	1–4		5–2					—		1–4	1–1	0–1
Paknampho				1–2		0–0	1–3	0–2	—	0–2		
Phichit United	2–2			2–0		2–1				—		3–1
Phitsanulok			3–0	6–1	3–2				3–1		—	
TNSU Lampang	2–1	0–4		4–2		1–2					0–6	—

Updated to match(es) played on 15 November 2026. Source: Thai League
Legend: Blue = home team win; Yellow = draw; Red = away team win.
For upcoming matches, an "a" indicates there is an article about the rivalry between the two participants.
