= TNSU Lampang F.C. =

TNSU Lampang F.C. มหาวิทยาลัยการกีฬาแห่งชาติ วิทยาเขตลำปาง
- Full name: Thailand National Sports University Lampang Campus Football Club
- Nicknames: The Sons of Balapati (ลูกพลบดี)
- Founded: 2025; 1 year ago
- Ground: Lampang Provincial Stadium; Lampang, Thailand
- Capacity: 5,500
- Coordinates: 18°18′09″N 99°28′25″E
- Owner(s): TNSU F.C. Co., Ltd.
- Chairman: Weerasak Wisalaporn
- Head coach: Thatchanon Jindapuk
- League: Thai League 3
- 2026: Thailand Semi-pro League, 1st of 9 in the Northern region
- Website: Facebook

The TNSU Lampang Football Club (Thai: สโมสรฟุตบอล ทีเอ็นเอสยู ลำปาง), or in full Thailand National Sports University Lampang Campus Football Club (Thai: สโมสรฟุตบอล มหาวิทยาลัยการกีฬาแห่งชาติ วิทยาเขตลำปาง), is a Thai professional football club affiliated with the Thailand National Sports University Lampang Campus, based in Lampang, Thailand. The club currently competes in the Thai League 3, the third tier of the Thai football league system, and plays in the Northern region.

== History ==
The club was founded in 2025, building on a group of footballers from Lampang Sports School who had finished as runners-up in the Northern region of the 2023 Thailand Amateur League. The club entered the 2025 Thailand Semi-pro League Northern Region, but withdrew before the start of the competition.

The club returned to competitive football in the 2026 Thailand Semi-pro League Northern Region, with a squad comprising players from five campuses of the Thailand National Sports University: Lampang, Chiang Mai, Sisaket, Udon Thani and Trang. The team won the Northern region and earned promotion to the Northern region of Thai League 3 for the 2026–27 season, marking the club's debut in the professional league system.

== Stadium and locations ==
Coordinates	Location	Stadium	Year
18°18′09″N 99°28′25″E	Mueang, Lampang	Lampang Provincial Stadium	2026 – present

== Season by season record ==
Season	League									FA Cup	League Cup	T3 Cup	Top goalscorer	
Season	Division	P	W	D	L	F	A	Pts	Pos	FA Cup	League Cup	T3 Cup	Name	Goals
2026	TS North	6	5	0	1	8	3	15	1st	Opted out	Ineligible	Ineligible	(Thailand) Nontavat Bamrungtham	4
2026–27	T3 North													

Champions	Runners-up	Promoted	Relegated

- P = Played
- W = Games won
- D = Games drawn
- L = Games lost
- F = Goals for
- A = Goals against
- Pts = Points
- Pos = Final position
- QR1 = First Qualifying Round
- QR2 = Second Qualifying Round
- R1 = Round 1
- R2 = Round 2
- R3 = Round 3
- R4 = Round 4
- R5 = Round 5
- R6 = Round 6
- QF = Quarter-finals
- SF = Semi-finals
- RU = Runners-up
- W = Winners

== Players ==
=== Current squad ===
As of

Note: Flags indicate national team as defined under FIFA eligibility rules; some limited exceptions apply. Players may hold more than one non-FIFA nationality.

No. / Pos. / Nation / Player	No. / Pos. / Nation / Player
