= Wat Tham Rong =

Buddhist temple in Phetchaburi province, Thailand

- วัดถ้ำรงค์
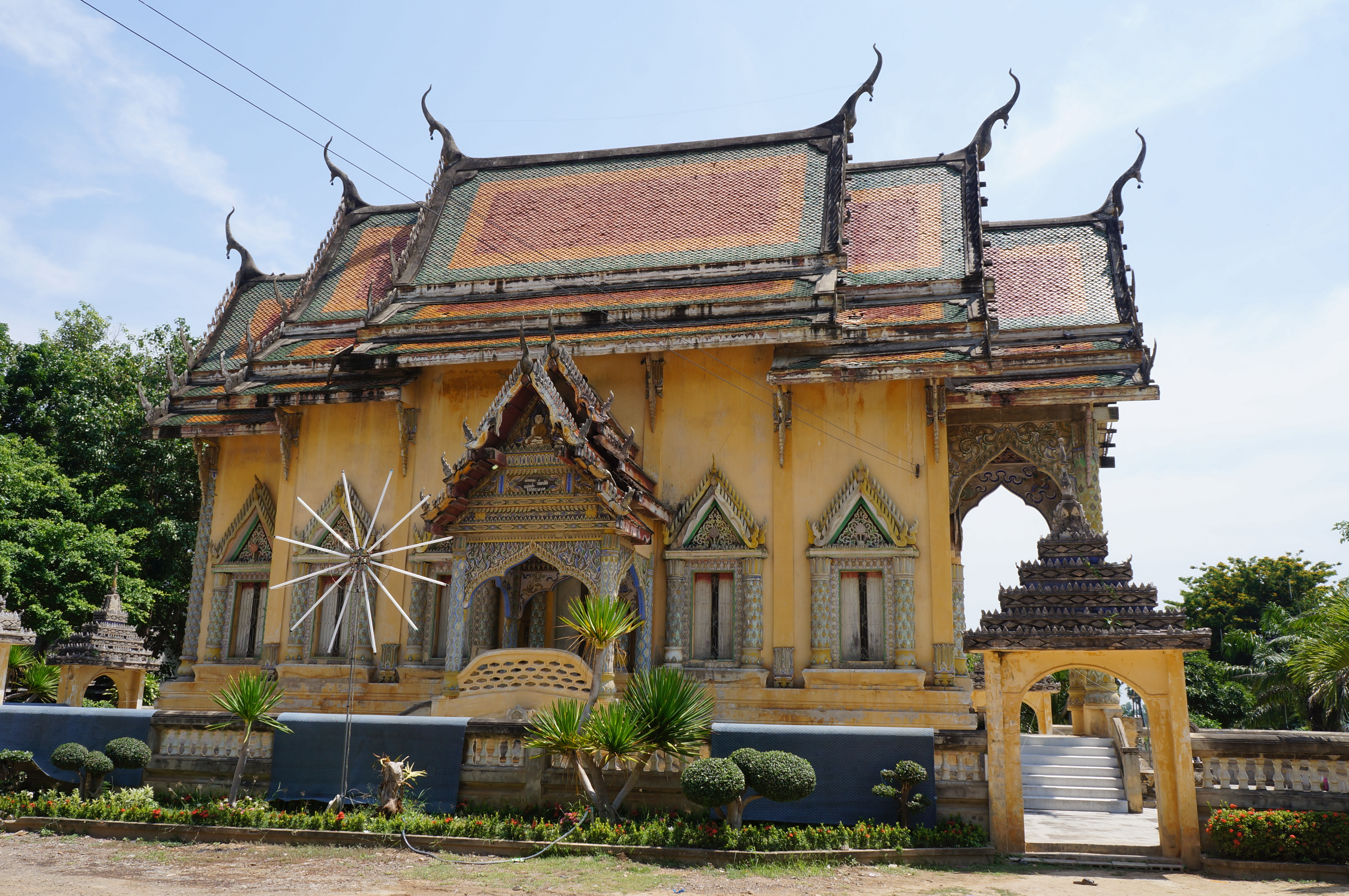
- The ubosot

Religion
- Affiliation: Buddhism
- Sect: Theravāda Mahā Nikāya

Location
- Location: Moo 3, Ban Tham Rong, Tham Rong, Ban Lat District, Phetchaburi
- Country: Thailand
- Interactive map of Wat Tham Rong
- Coordinates: 13.0259126703°N 99.9185112901°E

Architecture
- Founder: Unknown

Wat Tham Rong (Thai: วัดถ้ำรงค์, pronounced [wát tʰâm rōŋ]) is an ancient Buddhist temple in Phetchaburi Province, Thailand.

The temple is over 250 years old. It is remarkable that the ubosot (ordination hall) is a four-buildings with three-colours roof tiles. The stucco arts of the buildings were created by Phetchaburi artisans. The mural paintings on the wall were created by using local wisdom to mix gums and colour pigments therefore, the mural paintings have bright colour.

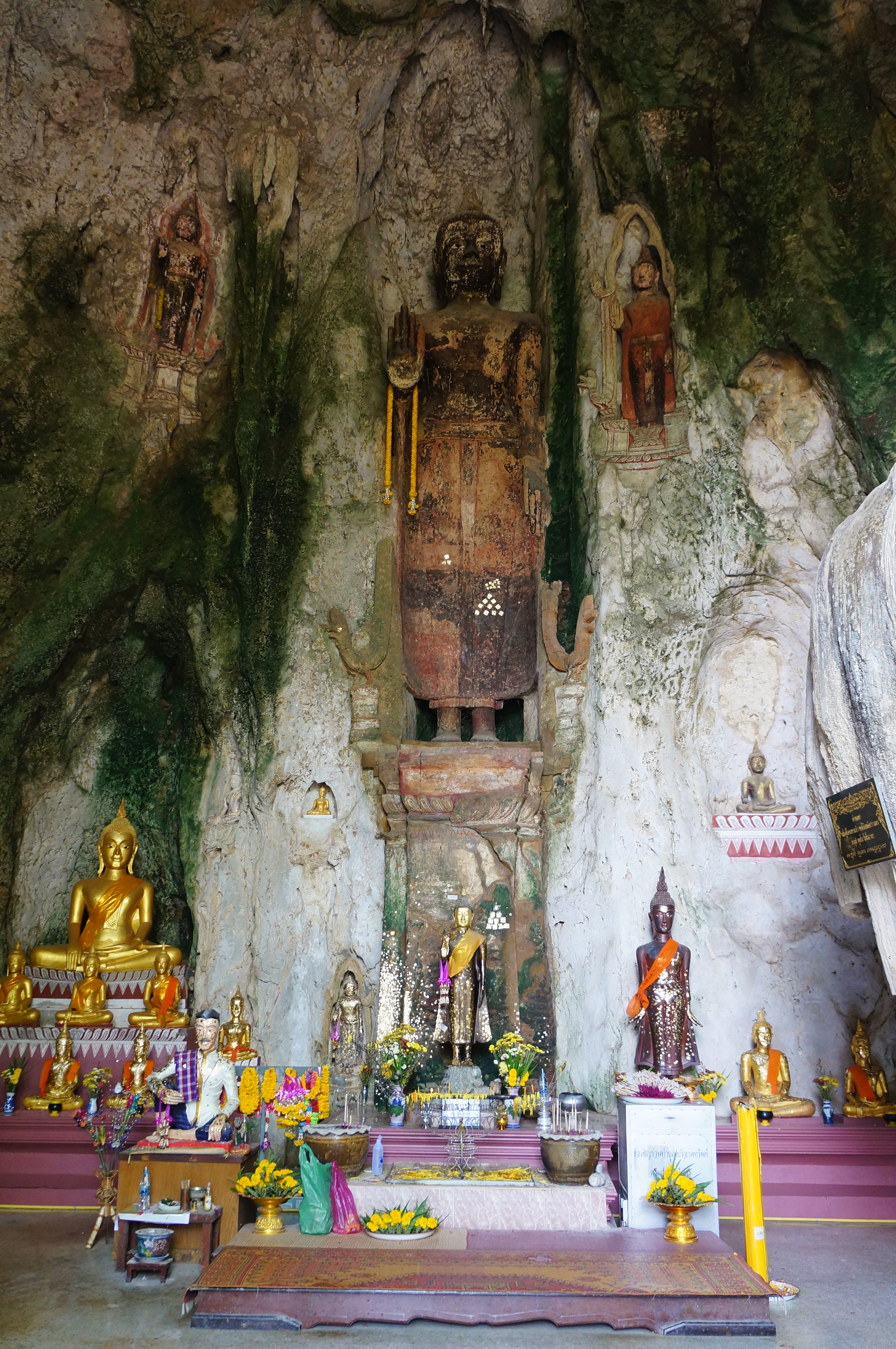
Luang Pho Dam

Another highlight is the adjacent cave, which is Tham Luang Pho Dam, the place where Luang Pho Dam is enshrined. A holy Buddha statue that was carved from a piece of stone that attached to the cave's wall, which is created according to the wisdom of people in the past. That is the entire Buddha statue is supported by the cave's wall. The Buddha statue's weight is 10 tons.

Luang Pho Dam was built in the late Dvaravati period or longer than one thousand years ago. When it was first built, it was coloured in black using black colour from betel palm, hence the name "Luang Pho Dam" (reverend father black). Time faded the black colour away so today the colour is pale reddish brown. The lower part from the waist down to the foundation, was carved from a piece of stone that to the cave's wall. While the upper part was carved from a piece of sandstone. Luang Pho Dam can be obviously seen that Gupta art from India influenced the characters such as it has thick lip, curly hair and big head. At it ankles were chains. Legendarily that at dusk it would often leave the cave to woo young women. The villagers had to tether it.

In addition, the stalactites inside the cave are also carved in reliefs showing the story of Lord Buddha. The carving can't be clearly seen as it has been eroded for a long time, but there are still some left to see.
