= Kaeng Krachan Dam =

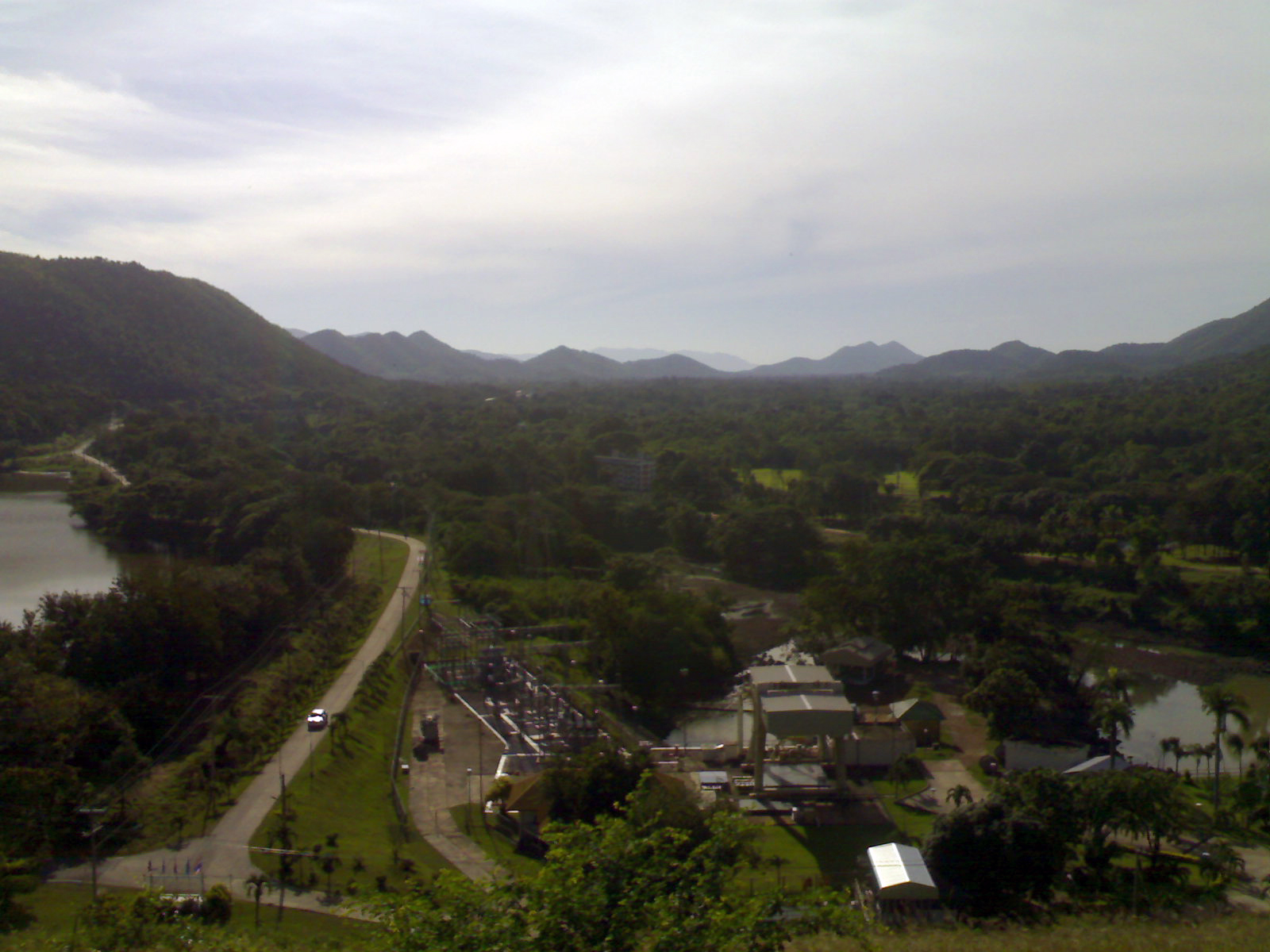

- Dam location in Thailand
- Interactive map of Kaeng Krachan Dam
- Country: Thailand
- Location: Kaeng Krachan, Phetchaburi
- Coordinates: 12°54′57″N 99°37′51″E
- Purpose: Multi-purpose
- Status: Operational
- Opening date: 1966
- Owner: Electricity Generating Authority of Thailand

Dam and spillways
- Type of dam: Earth fill dam
- Impounds: Phetchaburi River
- Height (foundation): 58 m (190 ft)
- Length: 760 m (2,490 ft)
- Elevation at crest: 106 m (348 ft)
- Width (crest): 8 m (26 ft)

Reservoir
- Creates: Kaeng Krachan Reservoir
- Total capacity: 710,000,000 m^{3} (2.5×10^{10} ft^{3})
- Catchment area: 46.5 km^{2} (18.0 mi^{2})

Power Station
- Operator: Electricity Generating Authority of Thailand
- Commission date: 1974
- Turbines: 1 x 19 MW
- Installed capacity: 19 MW
- Annual generation: 70 GWh
- Website; Kaeng Krachan Dam at EGAT

The Kaeng Krachan Dam (Thai: เขื่อนแก่งกระจาน, RTGS: Khuean Kaeng Krachan, pronounced [kʰɯ̀a̯n kɛ̀ŋ krā.t͡ɕāːn]) is a multi-purpose hydroelectric dam in the Kaeng Krachan District of Phetchaburi Province, Thailand. The dam impounds the Phetchaburi River. It was officially opened in 1966 by King Bhumibol and Queen Sirikit.

== Description ==
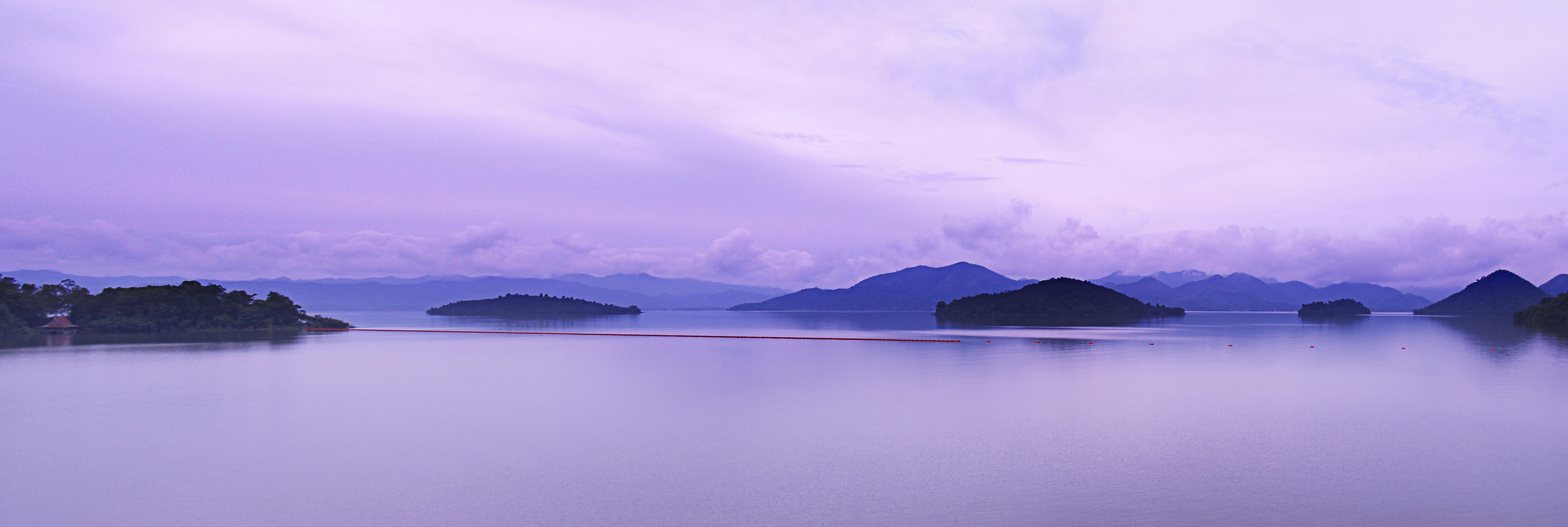
Reservoir at Kaeng Krachan Dam

Kaeng Krachan Dam is an earth dam. It is 760 m (2,490 ft) long and 58 m (190 ft) high. Its reservoir has a maximum storage capacity of 710,000,000 m^{3} (2.5×10^{10} ft^{3}) with a catchment area of 46.5 km^{2} (18.0 mi^{2}).

The dam is considered multi-purpose, supporting electricity generation, irrigation, water supply, fisheries and recreation activities. The islands in the reservoir were local hills prior to their submergence.

== Power plant ==
The dam's power plant has a single hydroelectric generating unit with an installed capacity of 19 MW. The annual power generation is 70 GWh.
