= Mae Nam =

Mae Nam (Thai: แม่น้ำ 'river') may refer to:

- Mae nam, a common prefix for river names in Thailand; see List of rivers of Thailand
- Mae Nam, an alternative spelling of Menam, a historic name used by foreigners to refer to the Chao Phraya River
- Mae Nam Subdistrict, a subdistrict (tambon) of Ko Samui district, Surat Thani province
