= Prommanusorn Phetchaburi School =

Coordinates: 13.1043°N 99.9380°E

Prommanusorn Phetchaburi School (abbreviated "PB") is located in Thailand. It is located on 278 Bandaiit Road, Moung, Phetchaburi. It consists of two level of education, lower secondary education and higher secondary education, in a coeducational system.

== Etymology ==
"Prom" (พรหม) from Sanskrit language Brahma and "anusorn" (อนุสรณ์ / Anusaraṇa) meaning "to follow", "commemoration" or "memorial", thus the school name reflects its goal "in the commemoration of Brahma".

== History ==
- In 1886, Phra Ajahn Rit established the school at Plubplachai Temple as a Thai Buddhist temple, during the reign of king Chulalongkorn the Rama-V of Chakri dynasty.
  - Phra Ajahn Rit (พระอาจารย์ฤทธิ์, literally "The Master Teacher of Spiritual Power" in Sanskrit) was a highly respected monk and predecessor of Phra Suwanmuni and a renowned master of both Vipassana meditation and traditional arts. Phra (พระ) from Sanskrit "vara" mans "excellent, noble, or holy" and "ajahn" (อาจารย์) from Sanskrit Ācārya meaning spiritual teacher, and "Rit" (ฤทธิ์) from Sanskrit Ṛddhi meaning supernatural power or accomplishment
  - Phlapphla (พลับพลา) is a native Thai word meaning a pavilion or a temporary royal residence, while "Chai" (ชัย / ไชย) is originally derived from the Sanskrit word "Jaya" (जय) meaning victory, in this context, "Plubplachai" means the "Palace of Royal victroy".
- In 1894, the Thai Buddhist monk named Phra Ajahn Suwanmunee taught reading and writing Thai language in his temple until children can read and write well.
  - Phra Ajahn Suwanmunee, literally means "Brahma-[like] Teacher Golden-Character Monk", from Sanskrit language "phra" (พระ) for the lord Brahma a Thai prefix also used to refer to monks and deities, "ajahn" (อาจารย์) from Sanskrit acharya meaning "teacher" or "professor", "Suwanmuni" (สุวรรณมุนี) from Sanskrit suvarṇa meaning "good/beautiful/golden" and varṇa meaning "character/class".
- In 1901, the school of Khongkharam Temple is a reputation and popularity until it can set up a primary school named Bumrung Thai.
  - "Wat Kongkharam" (วัดคงคาราม), directly translates to "The Temple of the Ganges" or "The Temple of the River", from two classic Sanskrit words the "Kongkha" (คงคา) Sanskrit Gaṅgā (गङ्गा) the sacred Ganges River in India or poetically any major such as Mae Khongkha the Goddess of Water, and Thai word "Ram" (ราม) from the Sanskrit Ārāma (आराम) meaning "pleasure garden" or "delightful place."
- In 1909, the school of Plubplachai Temple transferred school and students from Plubplachai Temple to combine with the school of Bumrung Thai.
  - Thai word "Bumrung (บำรุง) is derived from the Sanskrit word Paripūraṇa (परिपूरण) meaning to nurture, complete, or restore or perfect. Un Thai Adaptation, over time the "Pari-" prefix was dropped or softened, and "Pūraṇa" evolved into the Thai pronunciation Bumrung.
- In 1951, the Ministry of Education renamed this school as Phetchaburi School.
- In 1954, when Mr. Kowit Torwong was school principal, he moved the school into the "Grant hill Mahaisawan" - land granted by the government. It had the deserted temple but it has more space than the original and is not far from the community.
  - The Thai word derived "Mahaisawan" (มไหสวรรย์) is from Sanskrit that translates to "Great Sovereignty" or "Supreme Power," combining two Sanskrit root words "maha" (great) and "aisawan" (sovereignty/heavenly power).
- In 1956, this school is renamed as Prommanusorn Phetchaburi School to commemorate Colonel Mangkorn Promyokhee as a boys private school. While the school was historically an all-boys institution for lower levels, it began admitting female students to its Upper Secondary (Grade 10–12 or Mathayom 4–6) level in 1951 and became partil co-educational.
  - The name Mangkorn Promyokhee (มังกร พรหมโยธี) is composed of powerful Pali and Sanskrit roots, reflecting the military and noble background of Colonel Mangkorn Promyokhee (later General Phra Boriphan Yutthakit), a key figure in the 1932 Siamese Revolution - which ended absolute monarchy rule and resulted in a bloodless transition of Siam into a constitutional monarchy. Mangkorn (มังกร) is originally from Sanskrit word "Makara" (มกร, a legendary sea creature in Hindu and Buddhist mythology, often depicted as a hybrid part elephant, part crocodile or fish serving as the vahana (vehicle) of the river goddess Ganga and the god Varuna); Promyokhee (พรหมโยธี) a compound surname consisting of two distinct Sanskrit components - "Prom" (พรหม) from "Brahma" ( ब्रह्म) and "Yokhee" (โยธี) meaning "Yodhin" (โยธิน) or "Yodha (योद्धृ, warrior or soldier). The name Mangkorn Promyokhee can be interpreted as "The Dragon, the Divine Warrior" or "The Holy Soldier of the Great Dragon." It is a classic example of an "auspicious" Thai name chosen to reflect status, martial prowess, and spiritual virtue.
  - The 1956: the school was officially renamed and the new buildings at "Grant Hill Mahaisawan" were opened by Mangkorn Promyokhee, the school was already operating with this "mixed high school" structure.
- In 2000, the school became fully coeducational school at all levels and expanded by adding the lower secondary and higher secondary education. prior to the 2000, the school operated as an all-boys school for lower secondary education, while the upper secondary level was coeducational. In 2000, the school officially opened both lower and upper secondary levels to all genders.

== See also ==
- Gurukula, Gurukula is a traditional system of religious education of Indian-oriign religions like Hinduism and Buddhism in which Lord Buddha also studied
- Guru–shishya tradition, followed by Hindu Buddhists
- Sanskrit and Vedic learning
- Education in Thailand
- List of universities and colleges in Thailand
