= Kaeng Krachan Circuit =

- Location: Phetchaburi, Thailand
- Coordinates: 12°56′31″N 99°42′25″E
- Opened: 2010
- Major events: National Level, Club Level, Schools, Track Days

Full Course
- Length: 2.912 km (1.809 mi)
- Turns: 25

Medium Course
- Length: 2.400 km (1.491 mi)

Short Course
- Length: 1.004 km (0.624 mi)

Kaeng Krachan Circuit is the second longest race track in Thailand, opened in 2009. The circuit is located in the Phetchaburi Province. The track has 3 configurations: a full course of 2.912 km (1.809 mi), a medium course of 2.400 km (1.491 mi)., and a short course of 1.004 km (0.624 mi). Elevation changes including uphill and downhill turns, increasing and decreasing radius curves, with high and low speed turns being included. The layout is in a valley, enabling spectators to see the entire circuit. Kaeng Krachan Circuit hosts several kinds of racing events: national level, club level, auto and motorcycle racing schools, track days and other activities such as product launches, movie and advertisement filming.
