= Phetchaburi =

Coordinates: 13°06′43″N 99°56′45″E

Phetchaburi เพชรบุรี
- Town
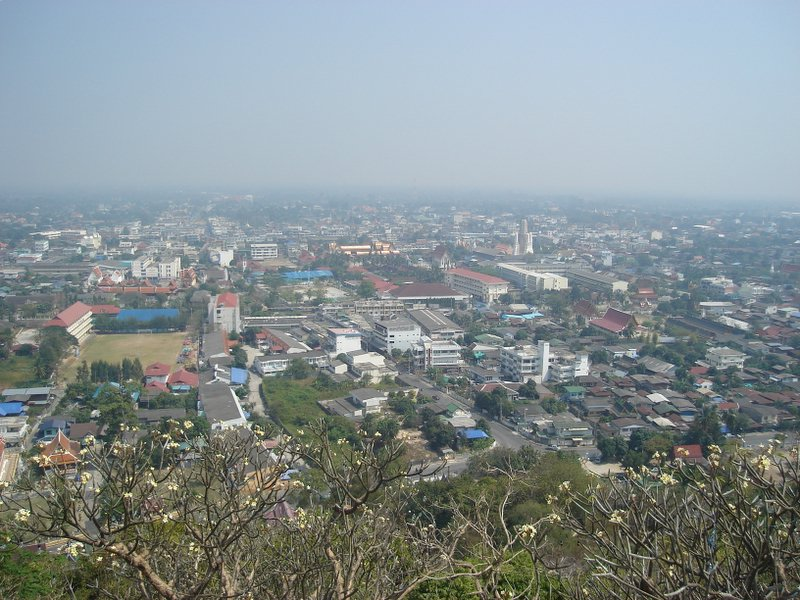
- Picture taken from atop Khao Wang, looking down on the town of Phetchaburi

- Location in Phetchaburi Province
- Country: Thailand
- Province: Phetchaburi Province

Area
  - Total: 5.4 km^{2} (2.1 sq mi)

Population (2005)
  - Total: 26,181
  - Density: 4,800/km^{2} (13,000/sq mi)
- Time zone: UTC+7 (ICT)

Phetchaburi (Thai: เพชรบุรี, pronounced [pʰét.t͡ɕʰā.bū.rīː]) or Phet Buri (pronounced [pʰét bū.rīː]) is a town (thesaban mueang) in southern Thailand, capital of Phetchaburi Province. In Thai, Phetchaburi means "city of diamonds" (buri means "city" in Sanskrit language). It is approximately 160 km south of Bangkok, at the northern end of the Thai peninsula. As of 2005, the town had a population of 26,181 and covers the two tambon Tha Rap and Khlong Krachaeng.

The Phetchaburi River runs through the middle of the city. The region is mostly flat, save for a single hill (called Khao Wang) on the outskirts of town. The royal palace named Phra Nakhon Khiri (from Sanskrit language, "Phara" from Vara meaning noble or blessed, "nakhon" from nagar from city, "khiri" from giri meaning hill or mountain), and one of the many wats are on top of Khao Wang. The hill and town is the site of an annual festival, called the Phra Nakhon Khiri Fair. It lasts for eight days in early February and includes a sound and light show and classical Thai dance.

The official city flower is the leelowadee flower or frangipani.

Phetchaburi is known for its traditional Thai desserts. The most well-known is a custard dessert called khanom mor gaeng. Other popular desserts include Portuguese-influenced thong yip, thong yod, and foi thong. In 2021, Phetchaburi was recognized by UNESCO as a creative city of gastronomy.

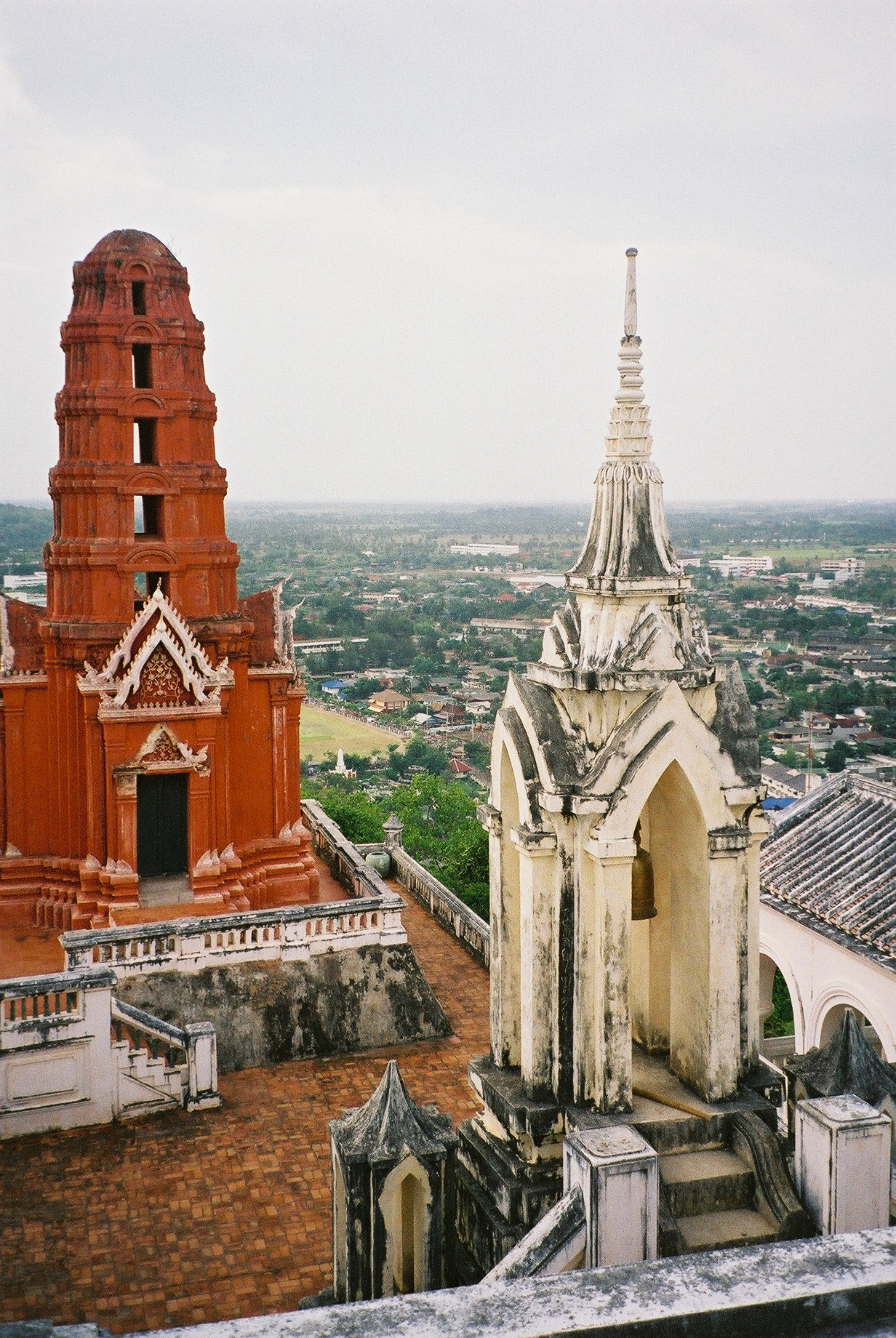
Khao Wang hill top, with the town of Phetchaburi partly obscured in the background

== History ==
Phetchaburi, earlier known as the Phrip Phri (Thai: พริบพรี) or Srijayavajrapuri (originally in Sanskrit from Jaya+Vajra+buri), was a Xiān political entity located on the west coast of the Bay of Bangkok, lower central Thailand. It was re-established in the 12th century by a ruler of the Padumasuriyavaṃśa line who came south from the Sukhothai–Nakhon Thai region. Chris Baker and Pasuk Phongpaichit date that foundation or refoundation by legend to 1157 or 1158, and describe the town as sited in a bend of a river with a wall and moat roughly one kilometre square, a Bayon-style temple and possibly a relic stupa at the centre. Previously, the city was a maritime-oriented port on the ancient trade route between India and China during the Dvaravati period, but was abandoned around the 11th century following the decline of the Dvaravati civilization. Walailak Songsiri accounts for the later town differently, deriving it not from a settlement in the Phetchaburi River basin but from the coastal site at Khao Chao Lai on the Cha-am shore, as she derives Ratchaburi from the moated town of Khu Bua. In the 12th century, Phrip Phri was possibly under Lavo's Ayodhya since several royals from Ayodhya were appointed the rulers of Phrip Phri, as mentioned in local chronicles and legends. It then became the vassal of the emerging Siamese Sukhothai and later formed part of the Ayutthaya kingdom in 1351, which made it functioned as a significant fortified frontier of Ayutthaya. Songsiri reports that excavation at the Phetchaburi city wall yielded sherds of only three kinds, from the Pa Yang and Ko Noi kilns at Si Satchanalai, from the Bang Pun kilns at Suphan Buri and from Fujian kilns of the Yuan period, with no Song ware among them.

== Education ==
Phetchaburi has numerous private and public schools from K-12. Several have English programs taught by native English speakers to ready students for higher education. Some of the schools are Benchamatheputhit School, Prommanusorn School, Benjamaputit Mattayom School, Wat Don Kaitia Prathom School, and Arunpradit Prathom/Mattayom School.

There are also several universities, including the following:

- Phetchaburi Ratchabat University (PBRU), meaning "University of the king's scholars of the city of diamonds" in Sanskrit, where raja means the "king" and bhat means " scholar, mercenary, hired soldier, warrior, combatant, etc", is a public university established in 1926.
- Silpakorn University Phetchaburi IT Campus, Silpakorn from Sanskrit shilp (art or skill) and karna (doer/maker), campus established in 2002 at Cha-am, specializes in Information Technology, Management Science, and Animal Sciences.
- Stamford International University (Hua Hin Campus): Despite the "Hua Hin" name, the physical campus is actually located in the Cha-am district of Phetchaburi. It is a private international institution offering degrees in Business and Liberal Arts.
- Webster University Thailand: A private international university with a residential campus in Cha-am, offering US-accredited degrees in fields like Psychology, Media, and International Relations

== Climate ==
Climate data for Phetchaburi (1991–2020, extremes 1981-present)
Month	Jan	Feb	Mar	Apr	May	Jun	Jul	Aug	Sep	Oct	Nov	Dec	Year
Record high °C (°F)	35.0 (95.0)	36.1 (97.0)	36.9 (98.4)	38.4 (101.1)	38.7 (101.7)	37.2 (99.0)	38.1 (100.6)	37.5 (99.5)	37.5 (99.5)	37.0 (98.6)	35.7 (96.3)	35.1 (95.2)	38.7 (101.7)
Mean daily maximum °C (°F)	30.6 (87.1)	31.5 (88.7)	32.5 (90.5)	33.8 (92.8)	33.9 (93.0)	33.4 (92.1)	33.0 (91.4)	33.0 (91.4)	32.6 (90.7)	31.8 (89.2)	31.5 (88.7)	30.7 (87.3)	32.4 (90.2)
Daily mean °C (°F)	26.1 (79.0)	27.5 (81.5)	28.8 (83.8)	29.9 (85.8)	29.8 (85.6)	29.3 (84.7)	28.9 (84.0)	28.8 (83.8)	28.4 (83.1)	27.9 (82.2)	27.4 (81.3)	26.0 (78.8)	28.2 (82.8)
Mean daily minimum °C (°F)	21.7 (71.1)	23.3 (73.9)	25.1 (77.2)	26.0 (78.8)	26.3 (79.3)	26.1 (79.0)	25.7 (78.3)	25.7 (78.3)	25.2 (77.4)	24.7 (76.5)	23.7 (74.7)	21.8 (71.2)	24.6 (76.3)
Record low °C (°F)	12.8 (55.0)	16.0 (60.8)	16.0 (60.8)	20.2 (68.4)	22.6 (72.7)	22.9 (73.2)	21.0 (69.8)	23.0 (73.4)	21.6 (70.9)	18.5 (65.3)	13.9 (57.0)	12.4 (54.3)	12.4 (54.3)
Average precipitation mm (inches)	16.6 (0.65)	4.5 (0.18)	43.9 (1.73)	39.8 (1.57)	95.5 (3.76)	87.0 (3.43)	87.8 (3.46)	90.7 (3.57)	151.6 (5.97)	283.6 (11.17)	64.2 (2.53)	10.3 (0.41)	975.5 (38.41)
Average precipitation days (≥ 1.0 mm)	1.0	0.8	2.4	3.1	8.0	9.3	10.1	10.8	12.9	14.4	4.4	1.1	78.3
Average relative humidity (%)	66.2	63.5	63.5	66.8	76.3	78.9	81.8	84.4	84.5	79.1	71.5	67.1	73.6
Mean monthly sunshine hours	229.4	211.9	238.7	204.0	155.0	114.0	117.8	58.9	108.0	108.5	171.0	226.3	1,943.5
Mean daily sunshine hours	7.4	7.5	7.7	6.8	5.0	3.8	3.8	1.9	3.6	3.5	5.7	7.3	5.3
Source 1: World Meteorological Organization
Source 2: Office of Water Management and Hydrology, Royal Irrigation Department (sun 1981–2010)(extremes)

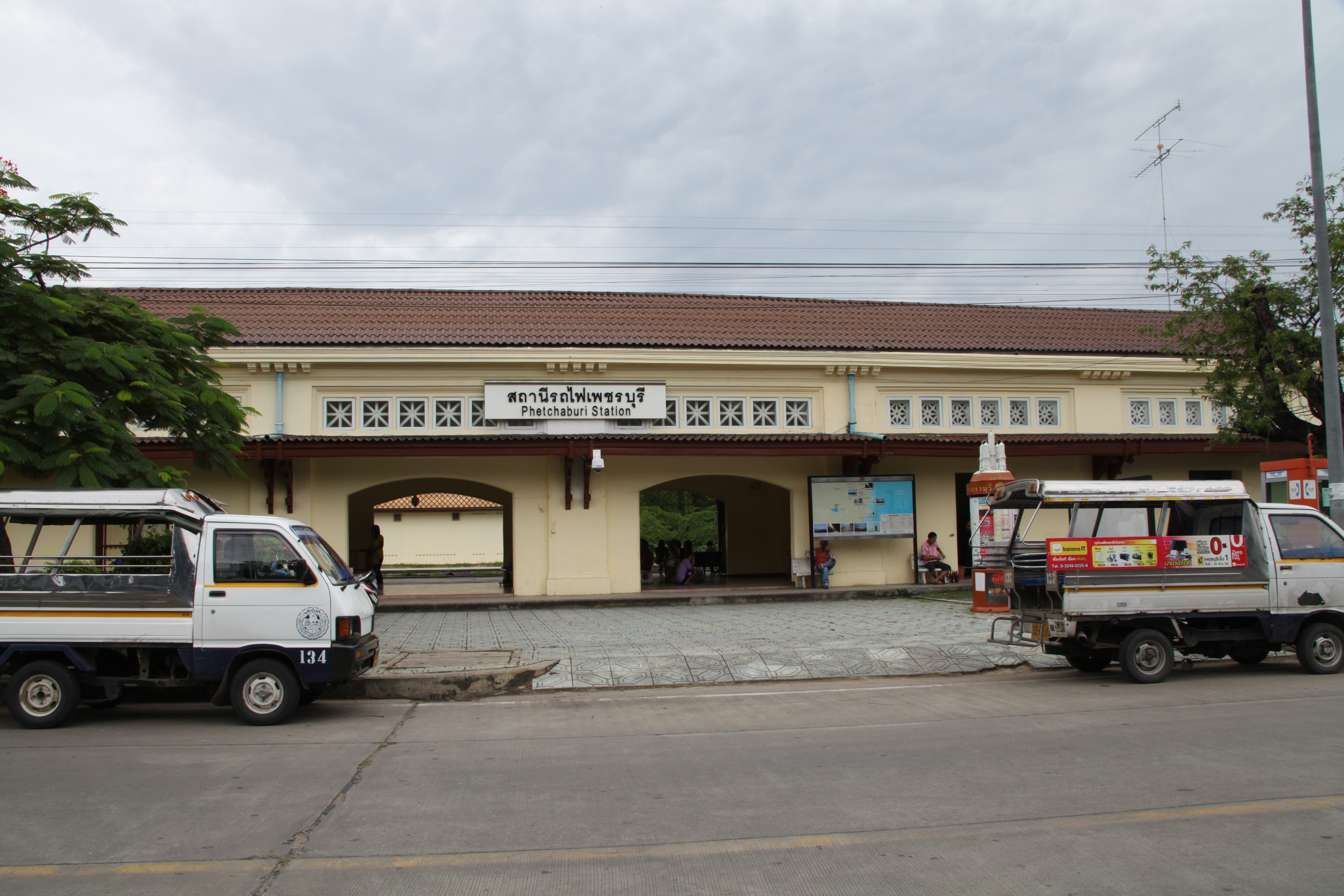
Phetchaburi Railway Station connects to Malaysia in the south and to rest of Thailand via Bangkok in the north.

== Transportation ==
Air: Hua Hin Airport (HHQ), 50 km southeast is nearest airport but handles only limited domestic flights. Suvarnabhumi Airport (BKK) 108 km northeast in Bangkok is the main international airport, Don Mueang International Airport (DMK) 105 km northeast in Bangkok serves as the hub for low-cost domestic and regional flights.

Rail: Phetchaburi Railway Station connects to the wider national rail network.

Road: Highway 4 (Phet Kasem Road) from Bangkok in northeast to Thailand-Malaysia Border in the south and Highway 37 (Cha-am–Pranburi Bypass) to southwest to Phuket are two main highway which connect to the wider Thai highway network.

Last-mile connectivity: In the city proper, the primary mode of transportation is by motor vehicle with motorbikes being the most popular. Cars are the second major form of transportation. Locals also travel by hired motorcycles and songthaews.

== See also ==
- Geography of Thailand
- Provinces of Thailand
- Southern Thailand
- Tourism in Thailand
