= List of rivers of Thailand =

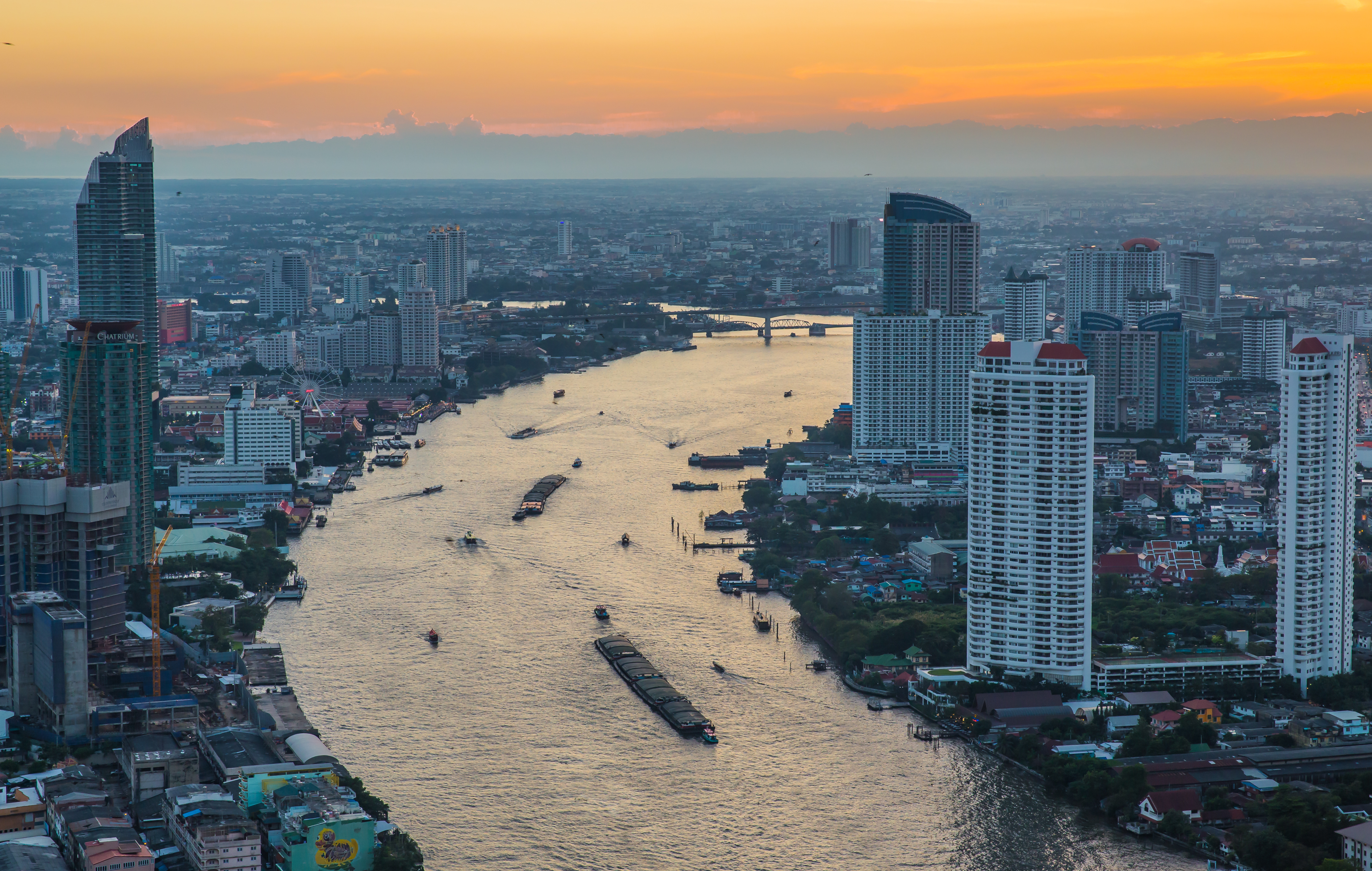
The Chao Phraya in Bangkok

This is a list of rivers of Thailand. The rivers are arranged alphabetically within their respective provinces or special governed districts. The same river may be found in more than one province as many rivers cross province borders.

The Mekong, Salween, and Golok are border rivers. The Mekong forms part of Thailand's border with Laos, the Salween with Myanmar, and the Golok with Malaysia. The Thai word for river is "mae nam" (Thai: แม่น้ำ 'river') , which literally means "mother water."

== Table list ==
This table shows all the important rivers:

No.	River name	Province	Length (km)	Tributary of	Refs
1	Mekong	Bueng Kan, Chiang Rai, Loei, Nakhon Phanom, Nong Khai, Mukdahan, Ubon Ratchathani	920 (part in Thailand)		
2	Chi River	Chaiyaphum, Kalasin, Maha Sarakham, Ubon Ratchathani	765		
3	Nan River	Nakhon Sawan, Nan, Phichit, Phitsanulok, Uttaradit	740		
4	Yom River	Chiang Rai, Nakhon Sawan, Phayao, Phichit, Phitsanulok, Phrae	700		
5	Ping River	Chiang Mai, Kamphaeng Phet, Lamphun, Nakhon Sawan, Tak	658		
6	Mun River	Buriram, Nakhon Ratchasima, Sisaket, Ubon Ratchathani	641		
7	Pa Sak River	Ayutthaya, Loei, Lopburi, Phetchabun, Saraburi	513		
8	Wang River	Chiang Rai, Lampang, Tak	392		
9	Khwae Yai River	Kanchanaburi, Tak	380		
10	Chao Phraya	Ang Thong, Ayutthaya, Chai Nat, Nakhon Sawan, Nonthaburi, Bangkok (special district)	372		
11	Moei River	Mae Hong Son	327		
12	Tha Chin River	Chai Nat, Nakhon Pathom, Samut Sakhon, Suphan Buri	325		
13	Ing River	Chiang Rai, Phayao	300		
14	Wa River	Nan	300		
15	Lam Takhong	Buriram	243		
16	Bang Pakong River	Chachoengsao, Prachinburi	231		
17	Loei River	Loei	231		
18	Tapi River (Thailand)	Nakhon Si Thammarat	230		
19	Sakae Krang River	Chai Nat, Kamphaeng Phet, Nakhon Sawan	225		
20	Pattani River	Pattani, Yala	214		
21	Li River	Chiang Mai, Lamphun	210		
22	Phetchaburi River	Phetchaburi	210		
23	Pai River	Mae Hong Son	180		
24	Phachi River	Ratchaburi	154		
25	Pak Phanang River	Nakhon Si Thammarat	147		
26	Mae Klong	Kanchanaburi, Ratchaburi, Samut Songkhram	132		
27	Nakhon Nayok River	Chachoengsao	130		
28	Trang River	Nakhon Si Thammarat, Trang	123		
29	Chanthaburi River	Chanthaburi	120		
30	Salween River	Mae Hong Son	120 (border section between Myanmar and Thailand)		
31	Kok River	Chiang Mai, Chiang Rai	115 (part in Thailand)		
32	Pai River	Mae Hong Son	111		
33	Golok River	Narathiwat	103 (border between Malaysia and Thailand)		
34	Noi River	Ayutthaya	100		
35	Lopburi River	Ayutthaya, Saraburi	95		
36	Sai River (Thailand)	Chiang Rai	30		
37	Ruak River	Chiang Rai	26.75 (border section between Myanmar and Thailand)		
38	Hueang River	Loei, Phitsanulok	130 (110 as Laos–Thailand border)		

== See also ==
- Geography of Thailand
