= Mueang Phetchaburi district =

Mueang Phetchaburi เมืองเพชรบุรี
- District
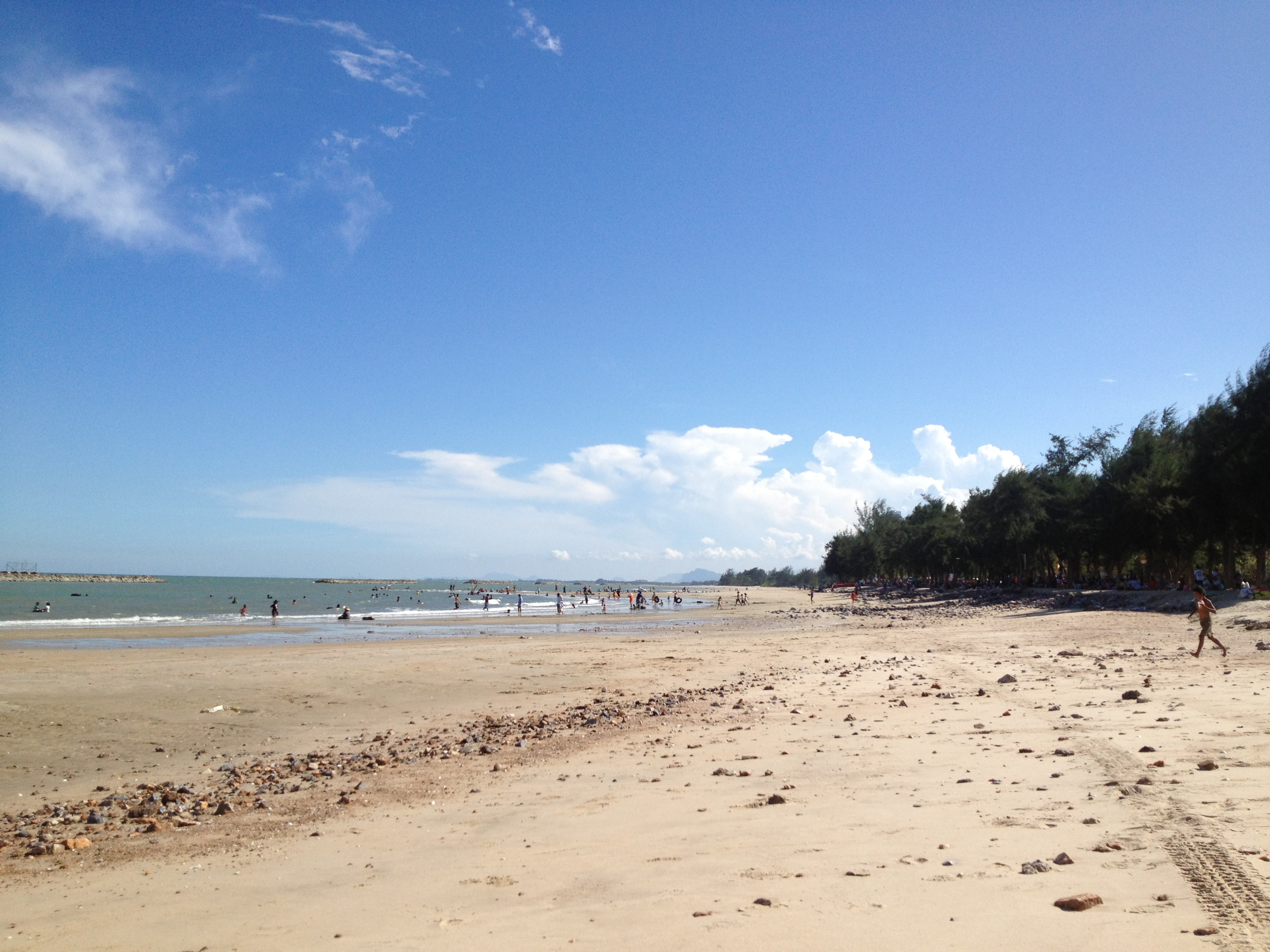
- Hat Chao Samran, popular beach in Hat Chao Samran

- District location in Phetchaburi province
- Coordinates: 13°6′43″N 99°56′38″E
- Country: Thailand
- Province: Phetchaburi

Area
  - Total: 283.9 km^{2} (109.6 sq mi)

Population (2019)
  - Total: 123,146
  - Density: 433.8/km^{2} (1,123/sq mi)
- Time zone: UTC+7 (ICT)
- Postal code: 76000
- Geocode: 7601

Mueang Phetchaburi (Thai: เมืองเพชรบุรี, pronounced [mɯ̄aŋ pʰét.tɕʰā.bū.rīː]) is the capital district (amphoe mueang) of Phetchaburi province, western Thailand.

== History ==
The district was established around 1903. The government named it Khlong Krachaeng because its center was in Tambon Khlong Krachaeng.

== Geography ==
Neighbouring districts are (from the northeast clockwise) Ban Laem, Khao Yoi, Ban Lat, and Tha Yang of Phetchaburi Province and the Bay of Bangkok.

The important water resource is the Phetchaburi River.

== Administration ==
The district is divided into 24 subdistricts (tambon), which are further subdivided into 184 villages (muban). There are three municipal areas within the district. The town (thesaban mueang) Phetchaburi covers tambons Tha Rap and Khlong Krachaeng. There are two townships (thesaban tambon): Hat Chao Sam Ran covers tambon Hat Chao Sam Ran, and Hua Saphan covers Hua Saphan and Wang Tako. The non-municipal area is administered by 18 tambon administrative organizations (TAO). As of 2019, the district had a registered population of 32,579 in municipal areas, and 90,567 in non-municipal areas.

The 24 subdistricts are:

1.	Tha Rap	ท่าราบ
2.	Khlong Krachaeng	คลองกระแชง
3.	Bang Chan	บางจาน
4.	Na Phan Sam	นาพันสาม
5.	Thong Chai	ธงชัย
6.	Ban Kum	บ้านกุ่ม
7.	Nong Sano	หนองโสน
8.	Rai Som	ไร่ส้ม
9.	Wiang Khoi	เวียงคอย
10.	Bang Chak	บางจาก
11.	Ban Mo	บ้านหม้อ
12.	Ton Mamuang	ต้นมะม่วง
13.	Chong Sakae	ช่องสะแก
14.	Na Wung	นาวุ้ง
15.	Sam Marong	สำมะโรง
16.	Pho Phra	โพพระ
17.	Hat Chao Samran	หาดเจ้าสำราญ
18.	Hua Saphan	หัวสะพาน
19.	Ton Maphrao	ต้นมะพร้าว
20.	Wang Tako	วังตะโก
21.	Pho Rai Wan	โพไร่หวาน
22.	Don Yang	ดอนยาง
23.	Nong Khanan	หนองขนาน
24.	Nong Phlap	หนองพลับ
