= Kaeng Krachan district =

Kaeng Krachan แก่งกระจาน
- District
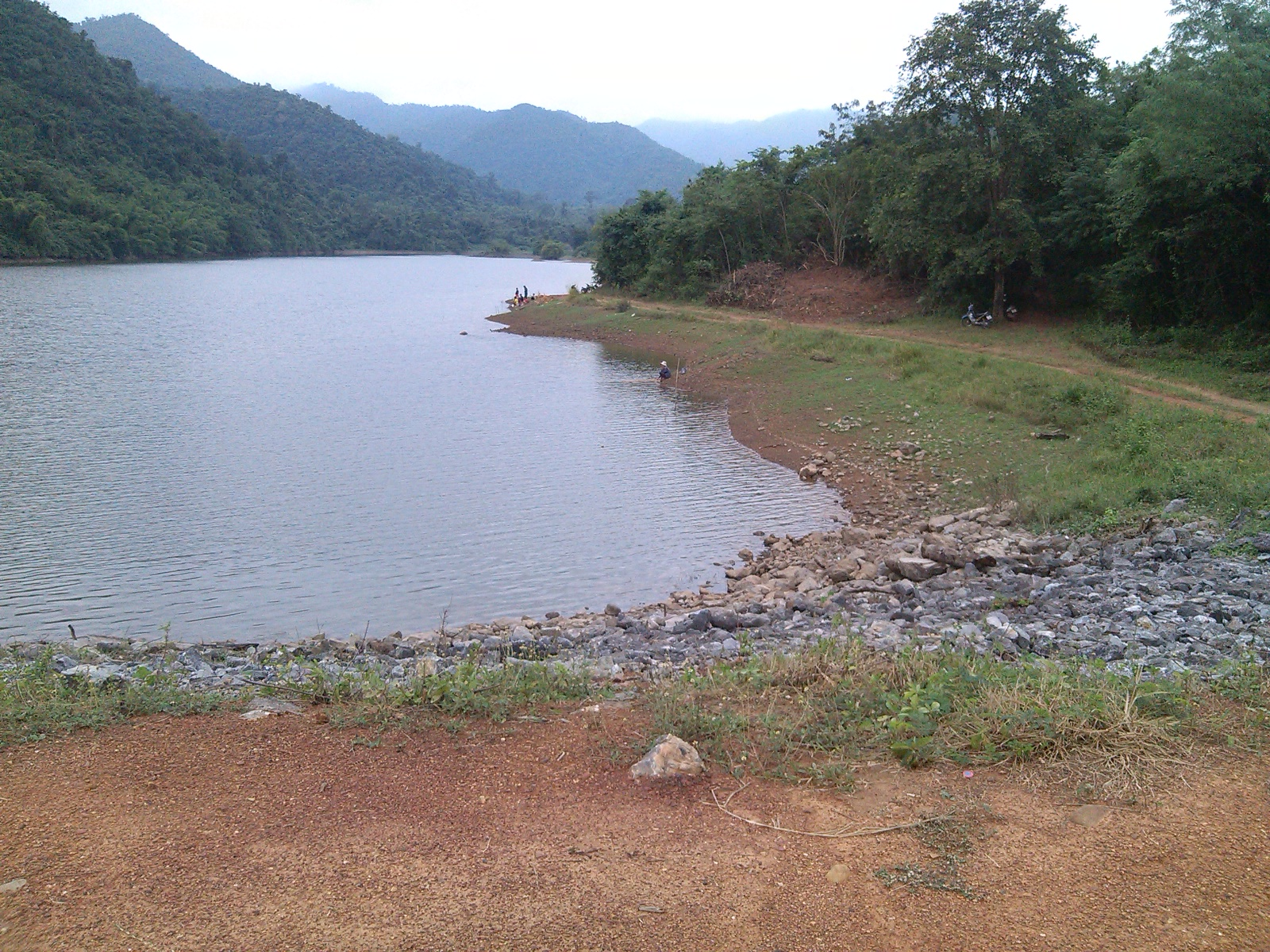
- Reservoir at tambon Pa Deng

- District location in Phetchaburi province
- Coordinates: 12°54′27″N 99°38′53″E
- Country: Thailand
- Province: Phetchaburi
- Seat: Kaeng Krachan

Area
  - Total: 2,500.478 km^{2} (965.440 sq mi)

Population (2005)
  - Total: 27,668
  - Density: 11.1/km^{2} (29/sq mi)
- Time zone: UTC+7 (ICT)
- Postal code: 76170
- Geocode: 7608

Kaeng Krachan (Thai: แก่งกระจาน, pronounced [kɛ̀ŋ krā.t͡ɕāːn]) is a district (amphoe) of Phetchaburi province, western Thailand.

== History ==
The district was created as a minor district (king amphoe) on 1 January 1988 by splitting off the three tambons Kaeng Krachan, Song Phi Nong, and Wang Chan from Tha Yang district. On 3 November 1993 it was upgraded to a full district.

== Geography ==
Neighboring districts are (from the north clockwise) Nong Ya Plong, Ban Lat, and Tha Yang of Phetchaburi Province, and Hua Hin of Prachuap Khiri Khan province. To the west is the Tanintharyi Division of Myanmar.

Most of the area of the district are the forested hills of Kaeng Krachan National Park. Both the Phetchaburi and Pranburi Rivers originate in these hills. The district is among the least populated districts of Thailand.

== Administration ==
The district is divided into six sub-districts (tambons), which are further subdivided into 52 villages (mubans). There are no municipal areas (thesaban) within the district, and six tambon administrative organizations (TAO).

No.	Name	Thai name	Villages	Pop.
1.	Kaeng Krachan	แก่งกระจาน	14	7,439
2.	Song Phi Nong	สองพี่น้อง	8	4,595
3.	Wang Chan	วังจันทร์	8	4,949
4.	Pa Deng	ป่าเด็ง	10	4,814
5.	Phu Sawan	พุสวรรค์	6	3,065
6.	Huai Mae Phriang	ห้วยแม่เพรียง	6	2,806

== Kaeng Krachan Library ==
The district houses a distinctive library, designed the Bangkok architectural firm junsekino.
