= Ban Lat district =

Ban Lat บ้านลาด
- District
- District location in Phetchaburi province
- Coordinates: 13°2′58″N 99°55′8″E
- Country: Thailand
- Province: Phetchaburi
- Seat: Ban Lat

Area
  - Total: 298.138 km^{2} (115.112 sq mi)

Population (2007)
  - Total: 50,351
  - Density: 168.9/km^{2} (437/sq mi)
- Time zone: UTC+7 (ICT)
- Postal code: 76150
- Geocode: 7606

Ban Lat (Thai: บ้านลาด, pronounced [bâːn lâːt]) is a district (amphoe) in the central part of Phetchaburi province, western Thailand.

== Geography ==
Neighboring districts are (from the north clockwise) Khao Yoi, Mueang Phetchaburi, Tha Yang, Kaeng Krachan, and Nong Ya Plong of Phetchaburi Province.

== History ==
Originally named Tha Chang (ท่าช้าง), it was renamed Ban Lat in 1939.

== Economy ==
The production of palm sugar (Thai: น้ำตาลปึก; RTGS: nam tan puek) is a specialty of the district.

== Administration ==
The district is divided into 18 sub-districts (tambons), which are further subdivided into 115 villages (mubans). Ban Lat is a sub-district municipality (thesaban tambon) and covers tambon Ban Lat. There are a further 14 tambon administrative organizations (TAO).

No.	Name	Thai	Pop.
1.	Ban Lat	บ้านลาด	3,604
2.	Ban Hat	บ้านหาด	3,133
3.	Ban Than	บ้านทาน	2,502
4.	Tamru	ตำหรุ	2,894
5.	Samo Phlue	สมอพลือ	2,241
6.	Rai Makham	ไร่มะขาม	2,872
7.	Tha Sen	ท่าเสน	3,668
8.	Nong Krachet	หนองกระเจ็ด	2,495
9.	Nong Kapu	หนองกะปุ	4,147
10.	Lat Pho	ลาดโพธิ์	1,227
11.	Saphan Krai	สะพานไกร	795
12.	Rai Khok	ไร่โคก	3,314
13.	Rong Khe	โรงเข้	2,034
14.	Rai Sathon	ไร่สะท้อน	4,965
15.	Huai Khong	ห้วยข้อง	1,159
16.	Tha Chang	ท่าช้าง	2,772
17.	Tham Rong	ถ้ำรงค์	3,389
18.	Huai Luek	ห้วยลึก	3,140
