= Lampang Province Stadium =

Sports venue in Lampang Province, Thailand

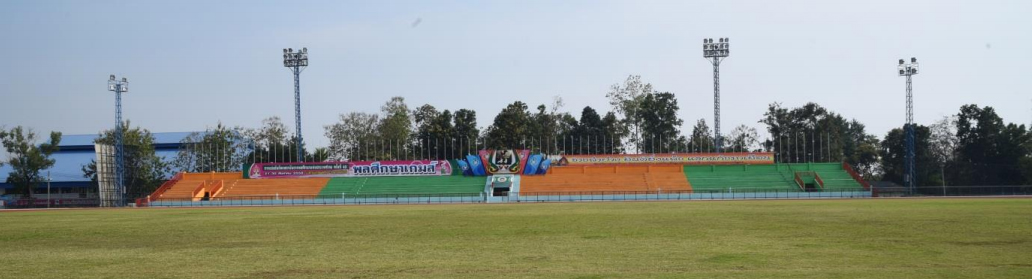
- Interactive map of Lampang Province Stadium
- Location: Lampang, Thailand
- Coordinates: 18°18′10″N 99°28′23″E
- Owner: Lampang Provincial Administrative Organization
- Operator: Lampang Provincial Administrative Organization
- Capacity: 5,500
- Surface: Grass

Tenant
- Lampang F.C.

Lampang Province Stadium or Nong Kra Ting Stadium (Thai: สนามกีฬาจังหวัดลําปาง หรือ สนามกีฬาหนองกระทิง) (known as Nong Krating Stadium) is a multi-purpose stadium in Lampang Province, Thailand. It is currently used mostly for football matches and is the home stadium of Lampang Football Club. The stadium holds 5,500 people and is home to the Lampang Football Club.
