= Tha Yang district =

Tha Yang ท่ายาง
- District
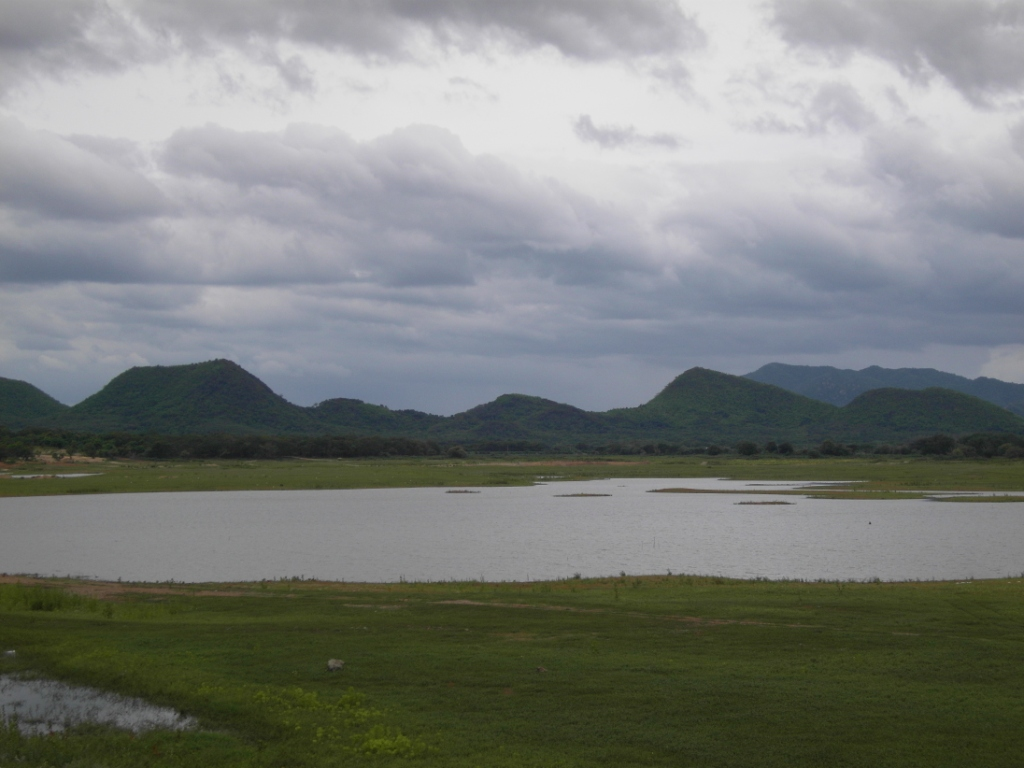
- Tung Ngam Lake, Khao Krapuk, Tha Yang District

- District location in Phetchaburi province
- Coordinates: 12°58′24″N 99°53′16″E
- Country: Thailand
- Province: Phetchaburi

Area
  - Total: 736.7 km^{2} (284.4 sq mi)

Population (2000)
  - Total: 80,794
  - Density: 109.7/km^{2} (284/sq mi)
- Time zone: UTC+7 (ICT)
- Postal code: 76130
- Geocode: 7605

Tha Yang (Thai: ท่ายาง, pronounced [tʰâː jāːŋ]) is a district (amphoe) in the southern part of Phetchaburi province, western Thailand.

== Etymology ==
In 1910, the western part of the district (which now is Kaeng Krachan district) was covered by dense forest. The main trees are Makha (Monkey Pod wood, Afzelia xylocarpa), Takhian (Ironwood, Hopea odorata) and Yang (Dipterocarpus alatus). Thus when the government established the district, they named it Tha Yang (literally, 'Yang tree pier').

== History ==
The district was originally named Yang Yong, and was renamed Tha Yang in 1939.

== Geography ==
Neighboring districts are (from the north clockwise) Mueang Phetchaburi, Ban Lat, Kaeng Krachan of Phetchaburi Province, Hua Hin of Prachuap Khiri Khan province, Cha-am of Phetchaburi Province and the Gulf of Thailand.

== Administration ==
The district is divided into 12 sub-districts (tambons), which are further subdivided into 119 villages (mubans). Tha Yang and Nong Chok are two townships (thesaban tambon): Tha Yang covers the whole tambon Tha Yang and parts of Tha Khoi, while Nong Chok covers parts of the same-named tambon. There are a further 12 tambon administrative organizations (TAO).

1.	Tha Yang	ท่ายาง
2.	Tha Khoi	ท่าคอย
3.	Yang Yong	ยางหย่อง
4.	Nong Chok	หนองจอก
5.	Map Pla Khao	มาบปลาเค้า
6.	Tha Mai Ruak	ท่าไม้รวก
7.	Wang Khrai	วังไคร้
8.	Klat Luang	กลัดหลวง
9.	Puek Tian	ปึกเตียน
10.	Khao Krapuk	เขากระปุก
11.	Tha Laeng	ท่าแลง
12.	Ban Nai Dong	บ้านในดง

Missing numbers belonged to tambon which now form Kaeng Krachan District.
