= Phetchaburi River =

River in Thailand

Coordinates: 13°15′57″N 99°56′32″E

Sign of the river

The Phetchaburi River (Thai: แม่น้ำเพชรบุรี, RTGS: Maenam Phetchaburi, pronounced [mɛ̂ːnáːm pʰét.t͡ɕʰā.bū.rīː]) is a river in western Thailand. It has its source in the Tenasserim Hills, in the Kaeng Krachan National Park, Kaeng Krachan district and flows through Tha Yang, Ban Lat, Mueang Phetchaburi and mouths into the Bay of Bangkok in Ban Laem district. It is 210 kilometres (130 mi) long, most of which is within the Phetchaburi Province. It is the backbone of this province.

== Etymology ==
Phetchaburi means "city of diamonds" (buri means "city" in Sanskrit language), hence, the Phetchaburi River means the River of City of Diamonds.

Phetchaburi, earlier known as the Phrip Phri (Thai: พริบพรี) or Srijayavajrapuri (from Jaya+Vajra+buri in Sanskrit), was a Xiān political entity located on the west coast of the Bay of Bangkok, lower central Thailand. It was established in the 12th century by a royal Pprappanom Tteleiseri from Soucouttae/Locontàï. Previously, the city was a maritime-oriented port on the ancient trade route between India and China during the Dvaravati period, but was abandoned around the 11th century following the decline of the Dvaravati civilization. In the 12th century, Phrip Phri was possibly under Lavo's Ayodhya since several royals from Ayodhya were appointed the rulers of Phrip Phri, as mentioned in local chronicles and legends. It then became the vassal of the emerging Siamese Sukhothai and later formed part of the Ayutthaya kingdom in 1351, which made it functioned as a significant fortified frontier of Ayutthaya.

== History ==
The significance of the water in this river is that it has been used in the coronation ceremonies of each Thai king. As well, the point where the river flows through Tambon Tha Chai, Ban Lat district was used as a drink for Phra Sutharos (royal drinking water) during the Rama V's reign.

== See also ==
- List of rivers of Thailand
- River systems of Thailand
