= List of Asian tornadoes and tornado outbreaks =

Parent article: List of tornadoes and tornado outbreaks

These are some notable tornadoes, tornado outbreaks, and tornado outbreak sequences that have occurred in Asia, including the Arabian Peninsula.

== Bangladesh ==
Tornadoes in Bangladesh occur at an average of 6 tornadoes annually. They typically occur during the pre-monsoon months between March and May, with peak activity in April. These tornadoes often originate from nor'westers in the region. Most of these tornadoes are destructive and deadly, including the Daulatpur–Saturia tornado which was regarded as the deadliest in the country and the deadliest worldwide with a total of approximately 1,300 people killed. The country also has the highest average annual tornado death toll recorded with a total of 179 deaths per year over the period of 1967 to 1996; higher than the United States with an average of 65 recorded deaths per year between 1974 and 2003.

Other notable tornadoes include the Faridpur tornado on 17 April 1973 where it was estimated to have killed at least 681 people, and the Tangail tornado on 13 May 1996 where it killed around 605 people.

== Cambodia ==
| Event | Date | Area | Tornadoes | Casualties | Notes |
|---|---|---|---|---|---|
| Russey Keo district tornado | 20 May 2014 | Russey Keo District, Phnom Penh | 1 | 2 fatalities | A 'tornado-like' storm damaged several homes in the district that resulted in two deaths. Residents described a 'long, rotating vortex' that struck the area. |
| Phnom Penh tornado | 18 November 2025 | Phnom Penh | 1 | None | Multiple debris were scattered and a tree was uprooted by a tornado. |

== China ==
The country of China experiences one of the highest number of reported tornadoes across Asia, with an average of 56 tornadoes per year since the Reform and opening up period in 1979. They typically form during the monsoon season and sometimes accompanied by typhoons, notably the tornado outbreak during Tropical Storm Maysak on 4–6 July 2026. Most tornadoes in China occur in the Northeast Plain, the North China Plain, the middle-lower Yangtze Plain, and the Pearl River Delta Plain regions. Frequency of tornadoes in the country increases during the summer months, with peak activity in July.

The deadliest tornado recorded was the Funing tornado in Jiangsu on 23 June 2016, where it killed 98 people and injured 846 others.

== India ==
There have been multiple tornadoes in India with more than 51 tornadic events recorded in the country since 1835. Most of which happen in the northeast portion of the country near Bangladesh, although occasionally tornadoes have been reported in northwest India, near Pakistan. They typically occur between the months of March and May, primarily influenced by nor'westers.

Tornadoes in India are often destructive and potentially deadly. The earliest known tornado recorded in the country was in 24 Parganas, West Bengal on 8 April 1838 where a tornado levelled multiple houses and trees in the area and several people were killed. The deadliest tornado in Indian history occurred near Belda in Medinipur, West Bengal on 24 March 1998, where it that damaged multiple buildings and killed 250 people.

== Indonesia ==
The country of Indonesia experiences an average of 16 tornadoes per year. Between 2010 and 2024, there are 234 documented tornadoes across the archipelago, some of which are notably destructive such as the tornado in Bogor, West Java on 6 December 2018 in which a tornado damaged 1697 structures, injured two people, and killed a person, unofficially rated as an EF1. Most of these tornadoes form during the Australian-Indonesian monsoon, although each region varies in peak initial tornadic activity. Unlike the tornadoes in the United States in which cases of tornadoes peak in May, tornadic activity in Indonesia occurs most frequently in November.

The earliest-known tornado recorded in the country was on 7 December 1815 in Surabaya, East Java where a home was destroyed by what was described as a violent tornado, killing one person and injuring four others. The most destructive tornado was recorded in Rancaekek, Java on 21 February 2024 where it damaged 1177 structures and injured 47 people, unofficially rated as an EF2. Another notable tornado was in Sidoarjo Regency, East Java on 22 November 2017 in which a tornado damaged more than 600 homes and injured 35 people.

== Iraq ==
| Event | Date | Area | Tornadoes | Casualties | Notes |
|---|---|---|---|---|---|
| Kahlaa tornado | 14 April 2016 | Al-Kahla District, Maysan Governorate | 1 | None | A low pressure system in the area resulted in the formation of an EF2 tornado where it caused multiple damages to nearby homes, transmission towers, and cars. |

== Japan ==
The country of Japan experiences an average of approximately 19 tornadoes annually, excluding waterspouts. The number of confirmed tornadoes are highest during the typhoon season accompanied by weather fronts, with peak activity between July and November. About 46% of tornadoes in the country are associated with an extratropical cyclone, while a further 20% are associated with tropical cyclones.

The deadliest tornado in the country since modern records began in 1961 by the Japan Meteorological Agency, was an JEF3 tornado in Saroma, Hokkaido on 7 November 2006, where it killed 9 people and injured 31 others. Meanwhile, the deadliest and earliest tornado in Japanese history was in Miyazaki on 26 September 1881 where it killed 16 people.

== Kuwait ==
| Event | Date | Area | Tornadoes | Casualties | Notes |
|---|---|---|---|---|---|
| Kuwait tornado | 11 November 2022 | northeastern Kuwait | 1 | None | Thunderstorms in the area resulted in the formation of a rare tornado. |

== Malaysia ==
| Event | Date | Area | Tornadoes | Casualties | Notes |
|---|---|---|---|---|---|
| Petaling Jaya tornado | 13 June 2010 | Petaling Jaya, Selangor | 1 | None | A tornado damaged several housing estates, hawker stalls, and more than 100 trees in Kota Damansara. |
| Jejawi tornado | 28 October 2010 | Jejawi, Perlis | 1 | None | A tornado damaged more than 50 buildings, mostly residential homes. |
| George Town tornado | 15 November 2010 | George Town, Penang | 1 | None | A tornado was recorded in the Gurney area. |
| Pendang tornado | 14 October 2014 | Pendang District, Kedah | 1 | None | A landspout severely damaged at least 10 buildings including residential homes and a school around Kampung Alor Besar. |
| Pandamaran tornado | 21 October 2014 | Pandamaran, Selangor | 1 | None | A storm spawned a tornado in the Teluk Gong area, severely damaging more than 30 houses and felling trees. |
| Alor Setar tornado | 31 October 2014 | Alor Setar, Kedah | 1 | None | A tornado damaged 72 houses and a village clinic. |
| Alor Setar possible tornado | 2 November 2014 | Alor Setar, Kedah | 1 | None | Swirling winds resembling a tornado damaged 13 houses in Taman Wira Mergong. |
| Simpang Empat tornado | 12 November 2014 | Simpang Empat, Kedah | 1 | None | A tornado damaged 25 houses and four shophouses in Kampung Sungai Nonang. |
| Bukit Kayu Hitam tornado | 26 January 2022 | Bukit Kayu Hitam, Kedah | 1 | None | Multiple debris was flown by a tornado when it struck the town. |
| Labuan tornado | 12 May 2026 | Kampung Tanjung Aru, Labuan | 1 | None | A tornado-like storm hit a residential area near Kampung Tanjung Aru in Labuan in Malaysia. The tornado uprooted trees, damaged 33 houses and injured one person. |

=== October 13 ===
List of confirmed tornadoes – Tuesday, October 13, 2026 (Note: All dates are based on the local time zone where the tornado touched down; however, all times are in Coordinated Universal Time for consistency.)
| EF# | Location | Region | Country | Start coord. | Time (UTC) | Path length | Max. width |
|---|---|---|---|---|---|---|---|
| EF? | Kota Damansara | Selangor | Malaysia | | 17:30 | Unknown | Unknown |
| EF? | A mini tornado lifted the rear end of a blue Perodua Alza before moving or throwing it into a white SUV in the adjacent lane. Both vehicles sustained minor body damage. | | | | | | |

== Maldives ==
| Event | Date | Area | Tornadoes | Casualties | Notes |
|---|---|---|---|---|---|
| Hithadhoo tornado | 17 May 2017 | Hithadhoo, Addu City | 1 | None | A tornado struck the Hithadhoo district of Addu City, damaging 12 homes and uprooting trees. |

== Mongolia ==
| Event | Date | Area | Tornadoes | Casualties | Notes |
|---|---|---|---|---|---|
| Batshireet tornado | 16 July 1974 | Batshireet, Khentii Province | 1 | Unknown | A tornado with similar strength as the Khashaat tornado occurred in Batshireet. |
| Khashaat tornado | 26 July 2014 | Khashaat, Arkhangai Province | 1 | 1 fatality, 9 injured | Five houses and three cars were destroyed by a tornado in the district. It was later classified at F4 based on the damages. |

== Myanmar ==
| Event | Date | Area | Tornadoes | Casualties | Notes |
|---|---|---|---|---|---|
| Kutkai tornado | 17 February 1981 | Kutkai, Shan | 1 | 4 fatality, 80+ injured | A tornado swept through the village of Kutkhai, leaving four people dead, more than 80 injured, and a path of destruction that reportedly leveled or damaged 400 buildings in five minutes. |
| Myanmar tornado | 15 May 1990 | between Kawlin and Mandalay | 1 | 1 fatality, 28 injured | A passenger train was derailed by a tornado which resulted in one death and 28 others injured. |
| Bogale Township tornado | 14 July 2009 | Bogale Township, Ayeyarwady Region | 1 | 1 fatality, 6 injured | A tornado struck small villages in Bogale Township, destroying 30 homes in the village of Kyein Chaung Gyi alone. |
| Mandalay tornado | 10 August 2009 | Mandalay | 1 | None | A tornado destroyed homes and a school in rural areas of central Myanmar. |
| Ayeyarwady region tornado | 10 August 2009 | Ayeyarwady Region | 1 | None | A tornado destroyed homes and a school in the village of Khit San. |
| Hpakant tornado | 6 April 2015 | Hpakant, Kachin State | 1 | 3 fatalities, 5 injured | Three people were killed and five others were injured when a tornado struck two villages in Hpakant. |
| Lewe tornado | 21 April 2023 | Lewe Township, Naypyidaw | 1 | 8 fatalities, 109 injured | A tornado struck two villages of Lewe Township which resulted in 8 deaths and 109 injured. A total of 155 houses were damaged in Aung Myin Kone village while 77 houses were damaged in Tada Oo village. |
| Kungyangon tornado | 26 July 2024 | Kungyangon Township, Yangon | 1 | None | A tornado hit Kanyingon village and Nyaungnigon village in Yangon Region's Kungyangon Township on the early morning of 26 July and left more than 70 houses destroyed. Government departments and social relief associations have jointly provided help to affected people. |

== Nepal ==
| Event | Date | Area | Tornadoes | Casualties | Notes |
|---|---|---|---|---|---|
| Bara–Parsa tornado | 31 March 2019 | Bara District & Parsa District | 1 | 28 fatalities, 1,176 injured | A storm, later identified as an EF2 tornado struck two districts in Madhesh Province. More than a thousand buildings and hectares of agricultural crops were destroyed by the tornado. It was considered to be the first confirmed tornado ever recorded in the country. |

== Oman ==
| Event | Date | Area | Tornadoes | Casualties | Notes |
|---|---|---|---|---|---|
| Jalan Bani Bu Ali tornado | 22–23 April 2023 | Jalan Bani Bu Ali, Ash Sharqiyah South Governorate | 2 | 1 injured | Two tornadoes struck Jalan Bani Bu Ali that were accompanied by thunderstorms and downdraft winds. On 22 April, a tornado damaged multiple structures and injured a person. A day later, another tornado hit the area, though no casualties were reported. |

== Pakistan ==
| Event | Date | Area | Tornadoes | Casualties | Notes |
|---|---|---|---|---|---|
| Bhalwal tornado | 28 March 2001 | Bhalwal, Punjab | 1 | 10 fatalities, >100 injured | A tornado with F2 intensity struck a village in Bhalwal that severely damaged buildings, toppled electrical poles, and threw away heavy equipment. This tornado reached wind speeds of up to 120mph (193km/h) and left more than 100 people injured due to flying debris. |
| Gadap Town & Lahore tornadoes | 17–18 February 2003 | Gadap Town, Sindh & Lahore, Punjab | 2 | 7 fatalities, 185 injured | On 17 February, a tornado killed five people and injured 35 others in Gadap Town, Sindh. More than 80 structures were destroyed, and several livestock were killed. A day later, another tornado struck near Lahore, Punjab, killing two people and injuring 150 others. A total of 400 homes were destroyed in four villages. |
| Khyber Pakhtunkhwa tornado | 26 April 2015 | Khyber Pakhtunkhwa | 1 | 45 fatalities, >200 injured | A storm, initially described as a "mini cyclone," later determined to be a tornado, struck the Valley of Peshawar in Khyber Pakhtunkhwa, Pakistan, killing 45 people and injuring at least 162. |

== Philippines ==
The Philippines experiences on average of 12 to 24 tornadoes annually. They typically range between EF0 and EF1 intensities, rarely reaching EF2 intensities in the Enhanced fujita scale (EF Scale); although some are rated as EFU due to insufficient data. To date, there is only one tornado in the country's recorded history that had received an EF3-equivalent rating. The peak season for tornadoes are documented between the months of June and August. Reports of tornadoes have increased since 2009 due to rise of internet access in the country, primarily through social media and news outlets. Tornadoes are common during severe thunderstorms influenced by the southwest monsoon and sometimes accompanied by typhoons.

The most notable and well-documented tornado is the Manila tornado on 14 August 2016; a rare multi-vortex EF1 tornado that swept through Metro Manila. It damaged more than 100 buildings and injured 2 people. The earliest-known tornado recorded in the country was in Morong, Rizal on 17 May 1871, where a tornado that originated as a waterspout, destroyed 43 houses and toppled several trees. The deadliest tornado recorded is the Manukan tornado in Manukan, Zamboanga del Norte on 12 June 1990, where an EF2 tornado destroyed a total of 154 houses, killed 51 people, and injured more than 100 others.

== Qatar ==
| Event | Date | Area | Tornadoes | Casualties | Notes |
|---|---|---|---|---|---|
| Doha tornado | 1 November 2015 | Doha | 1 | None | A tornado formed in Doha, though no damages were reported. |
| Ras Laffan Industrial City tornado | 7 December 2022 | Ras Laffan Industrial City, Al Khor | 1 | None | A rare tornado was spotted from Al Bayt Stadium before the 2022 FIFA World Cup match between England and France. |

== Saudi Arabia ==
| Event | Date | Area | Tornadoes | Casualties | Notes |
|---|---|---|---|---|---|
| Sakaka tornado | 5 December 2020 | Sakaka, Al-Jouf Province | 1 | None | A supercell thunderstorm formed a tornado on the desert in Sakaka. |
| Rabigh tornado | 6 January 2025 | Rabigh, Mecca Province | 1 | None | Severe weather conditions in the region resulted in a powerful tornado that struck coastal areas. |
| Umluj tornado | 24 January 2026 | Umluj, Tabuk Province | 1 | None | A downdraft that brought thunderstorms resulted in the formation of a rare tornado. |

== Singapore ==
| Event | Date | Area | Tornadoes | Casualties | Notes |
|---|---|---|---|---|---|
| Serangoon tornado | 2 November 1950 | Serangoon | 1 | 7 injured | More than 100 homes were unroofed and 7 people were injured by a tornado that struck Serangoon. A 10-year-old boy was thrown into a canal when the tornado hit the area. |

== South Korea ==
| Event | Date | Area | Tornadoes | Casualties | Notes |
|---|---|---|---|---|---|
| Goyang tornado | 10 June 2014 | Goyang, Gyeonggi Province | 1 | 'Several' injured | First supercell tornado ever documented in South Korea. It injured several people and destroyed about 20 greenhouses. It lasted for 18 minutes. The tornado was rated at F0. |

== Sri Lanka ==
| Event | Date | Area | Tornadoes | Casualties | Notes |
|---|---|---|---|---|---|
| Medirigiriya tornado | 12 March 2006 | Medirigiriya, Polonnaruwa District | 1 | None | More than a thousand homes were damaged, almost 500 of which were flattened. |

== Taiwan ==
Tornadoes in Taiwan occur with an average of 4 to 6 tornadoes annually. Between 1998 and 2021, there are a total number of 156 documented tornadoes in the country. Most of these tornadoes form during the summer monsoon months from April to October in the southern portion of the country, also known as the country's "tornado nest" which account for two-thirds of total documented tornadoes.

There are some notable tornadoes in Taiwan. On 12 May 2011, a rare anti-cyclonic F1 tornado formed in Xindian District, New Taipei City. It was also the first tornado ever observed in the northern region. Meanwhile, on 6 April 2013, the country's first multi-vortex tornado hit Dashu District, Kaohsiung and Wandan, Pingtung and was given an F2 rating by the Central Weather Administration. The earliest mention of a tornado in the country was in Anping, Tainan on 3 June 1877. However, the first officially confirmed tornado in the country by the Central Weather Administration was in Tainan on 18 April 2007 where it damaged more than a hundred homes and was rated at F2.

== Thailand ==
| Event | Date | Area | Tornadoes | Casualties | Notes |
|---|---|---|---|---|---|
| Ban Trakob tornado | 21 October 2005 | Chaiya, Surat Thani | 1 | None | A tornado hit Village 1, 2 and 5 of Ban Trakob, damaging more than 60 houses and the local health center. Strong winds uprooted trees that fell onto power lines, plunging the entire village into a power blackout. |
| Sam Bandit tornado | 20 April 2012 | Uthai District, Phra Nakhon Si Ayutthaya | 1 | None | A tornado struck the Sam Bandit subdistrict where it damaged a total of 135 homes. Nearby subdistricts Pho Sao Han and Nong Nam Som were also hit, with more than 70 homes damaged. It stayed on the ground for approximately 30 minutes. Roofs were blown away, trees were uprooted, power poles were toppled, and some cars were lifted and tossed away. |
| Typhoon Vicente | 24 July 2012 | Udon Thani, Udon Thani | 1 | 1 injured | A tornado struck three villages in Nong Khon Kwang subdistrict where 11 houses sustained damages, one of which was destroyed, multiple power poles, traffic signs, and billboards were destroyed, a E-tak tractor was thrown 60 meters away while a two-tub washing machine was carried away about 50 meters. |
| Bang Phra tornado | 10 September 2013 | Mueang Trat District, Trat | 1 | 9 injured | A waterspout tornado tore through Satree Prasertsin School, as captured by around twenty CCTV cameras. The tornado damaged two school buildings, shattering windows, furniture and doors, and injuring nine students. In addition, fallen trees crushed three cars, and over 30 nearby houses were damaged, resulting in total losses estimated at serveral million baht. |
| Nong Hin tornado | 22 April 2015 | Bang Lamung district, Chon Buri | 1 | None | A tornado struck the Nong Hin village, damaging over 100 houses, numerous shops, toppling 32 power poles and damaging some parked cars. The tornado lasted for 5 minutes. |
| Na Phiang tornado | 25 July 2015 | Kusuman District, Sakon Nakhon | 1 | 3 injured | The severe storm destroyed over 72 houses, six of which were competely flattened and caused widespread damage to trees, utillity poles, and a temple pavilion, resulting in a power outage. 3 people were injured. |
| Pat Riew tornado | 26 July 2016 | Monthong, Pat Riew, Chachoengsao | 1 | 1 fatality, 9 injured | A large rice mill facility under construction at Siriporn Rice Mill Co., Ltd collapsed. The incident killed one person and injured nine others. The collapse destroyed a 40x280-meter nearly-completed building and an adjacent 40x80-meter steel frame structure, damaging several properties and vehicles parked in the area. |
| May 17th Central-Eastern Thailand Outbreak | 17-18 May 2017 | Tha Tako district and Takhli district, Nakhon Sawan, Pho Prathap Chang district, Phichit, & Ban Phe, Rayong | 6 | 1 injured | On the afternoon of May 17, 2017, atmospheric instability generated multiple tornadoes across central and eastern Thailand. At 14:30, two tornadic waterspouts made landfall in Pho Prathap Chang District, Phichit Province, leveling one residence, tearing the roof off an adjacent structure, and sweeping household items and two motorcycles into a nearby canal. At 16:00, a third tornado formed in Tha Tako District, damaging 23 structures and two granaries across Moo 3 and Moo 10. One structure completely collapsed, injuring a resident. The storm reportedly spawned a satellite tornado, though no additional damage occurred. Later that evening, the fifth tornado struck Takhli District near the Takhli Royal Thai Air Force Base, damaging 23 roofs and snapping 90 high-voltage utility poles. The resulting power blackouts extended into neighboring Chai Nat Province, with total infrastructure losses estimated at over 6 million baht. On the afternoon of May 18, 2017, a tornado hit the Ban Phe market area in Rayong Province. The storm uprooted large trees, crushing three automobiles and two motorcycles, while strong winds damaged roof tiles on 30 homes and commercial storefronts. |
| Bang decha tornado | 11 September 2017 | Prachin Buri | 1 | None | A waterspout moved ashore, knocking down multiple high-voltage utility poles and large trees, blocking traffic along major routes, caused widespread power outages, and lasted for 10 minutes before dissipating. The same parent storm subsequently produced heavy rainfall across the area. |
| Mueang Surat Thani tornado | 30 December 2017 | Mueang Surat Thani District | 1 | 3 injured | The tornado damaged over 120 houses, multiple estates, a military camp, schools, and local businesses, blowing off roofs and leaving several homes uninhabitable. Three people sustained minor injuries. |
| Bueng Prue tornado | 7 March 2018 | Thepharak District, Nakhon Ratchasima | 1 | None | The tornado happened right on the street while cars were driving past, causing panic among local residents before it dissipated. No damages were reported. |
| Mahachai tornado | 18 August 2018 | Mueang Samut Sakhon district, Samut Sakhon | 1 | 1 fatality | The tornado swept through the evening market. The tornado caused damage to nearby shops, residences, and commercial buildings. A 65-year-old worker, who was cleaning an inflatable bouncy castle, was swept up into the air along with the inflatable structure. His body crashed through the roof a nearby bar resulting in his death. |
| Nong Nam Sai tornado | 23 May 2020 | Erawan, Loei | 1 | None | Twenty houses were damaged. A local resident reported being shocked after the storm lifted away nearly half of their family's two connected houses, causing severe structural damage. |
| Bang Khla tornado | 25 July 2021 | Bang Khla district, Chachoengsao | 1 | 3 injured | Six villages in Bang Khla and Pak Nam subdistricts were struck by a tornado, damaging multiple homes and toppled electrical poles the tornado also threw tree tops away 1km and a radius of 1km. |
| Bang Chak Tornado | 4 October 2021 | Phra Pradaeng, Samut Prakan | 2≤ | None | A tornado struck the luxury housing estate. The tornado lasted for 5-10 minutes, stripped away roofs, collapsed walls, destroyed ceilings, shattered windows and at least 6-7 vehicles were impacted by fallen trees and debris. Additionally, uprooted trees down utility lines, and heavy steel sheets weighing over 100 kg were hurled onto local roadways |
| Mai Rood tornado | 27 May 2022 | Khlong Yai District, Trat | 1 | 1 injured | A tornado damaged 11 homes, four of which suffered severe structural damage. The tornado lasted under 10 minutes. A 55-year-old woman who sustained a minor head injury from flying roof tiles. |
| Bang Mun Nak tornado | 26 April 2023 | Bang Mun Nak district, Phichit | 1 | None | A tornado blew two passenger carriages off the tracks, with the first being thrown into an open field with shattered windows, and the second derailing and damaging nearly 100 meters of railway track and concrete sleepers. The combined weight of the two cars was approximately 176,370 lb (80 metric tons). |
| Sak Lek tornado | 28 April 2023 | Sak Lek, Pichit | 1 | None | A tornado struck several villages in Sak Lek district, causing two concrete company buildings to collapse, and damaging over 100 houses and 3 houses were destroyed, numerous shops and restaurants were also damaged, it also toppled 24 electricity poles which resulting in power outages in several districts. |
| Sam Ngam tornado | 22 May 2023 | Sam Ngam District, Pichit | 1 | 7 fatalities, 15 injured | Two subdistricts in Sam Ngam district where struck by a tornado where it resulted in more than more than 300 homes damaged. A school in Noen Po subdistrict was hit and a large dome collapsed, killing 7 people. |
| Pakham tornado | 6 July 2023 | Pakham District, Buri Ram | 1 | None | No damages were reported from the tornado. |
| Ban Laem tornado | 12 August 2023 | Ban Laem district, Phetchaburi province | 1 | 2 fatalities, 5 injured | A waterspout formed over the river and moved inland at the Bang tabun River mouth in Ban Laem District, Phetchaburi Province. The vortex caused structural damage on land and capsized a tourist boat, resulting in two fatalities. |
| Laem Talumphuk tornado | 26 November 2023 | Pak Phanang, Nakhon Sri Thammarat | 1 | None | A waterspout moved ashore at Laem Talumphuk in Pak Phanang District. Striking at night, the tornado damaged two homes, tearing off their roofs and uprooting trees that blocked local roads; no injuries were reported. |
| Phra Samut Chedi tornado | 6 October 2024 | Phra Samut Chedi district, Samut Prakan | 1 | None | A waterspout formed over local fish and shrimp farming ponds and moved ashore across Moo 1 and Moo 4 in Ban Khlong Suan Subdistrict. The vortex damaged over 20 homes by stripping away roofs, collapsing structural walls, uprooting trees, and knocking down utility poles. |
| Nong Khang tornado | 8 March 2025 | Cha-am district, Petchaburi | 1 | None | A severe summer storm accompanied by a waterspout struck the Nong Kang Community. The tornado damaged 15 houses, competely tearing off roofs of several residences and scattering debris onto a nearby railway overpass bridge. No casualties were reported. |
| Non Lat tornado | 12 May 2025 | Khun Han district, Sisaket | 1 | None | A tornado formed over an open field before tearing into the village, blowing off roofs and causing widespread panic among residents. |
| Tropical Storm Wipha (2025) | 24 July 2025 | Mueang Phitsanulok district, Phitsanulok | 1 | 1 injured | Atmospheric instability associated with Typhoon WIpha generated a tornado in Mueang Phitsanulok District. The storm struck the residential sub-districts of Don Thong and Hua Ro, damaging over 30 structures including homes, school buildings, and local temples and causing power outages due to fallen utility poles. One person was injured by flying glass debris. |
| October 12th 2025 Outbreak | 12 October 2025 | Ko Chan District, Chonburi, Ban Pho District, Chachoengsao Province, & Bang Bo district, Samut Prakan | 3 | None | A weather event produced multiple tornadoes across central and eastern Thailand, affecting Chonburi, Chachoengsao, and Samut Prakan provinces during the afternoon and evening. In the afternoon, a tornado struck the open-air camping ground around the Khlong Luang Rachalothorn Reservoir in Ko Chan District, Chonburi Province. It lifted tents, stalls, and personal belongings into the air.. The wind lifted individuals off the ground and carried them along with the airflow, causing panic and property damage, though no serious injuries or fatalities were reported.. Later in the evening, a tornado passed through Moo 3, Theppharat Subdistrict, Ban Pho District, Chachoengsao Province. The whirlwind damaged several houses, tearing roofs off four to five households. At approximately 4:09 p.m. local time, a tornado formed and struck Preng Subdistrict in Bang Bo District, Samut Prakan Province, near the Asia Industrial Estate. It damaged about five homes, including a two-story residence that was nearly flattened, and lifted heavy objects, such as a multi-ton water pump and sheet metal roofing, into the air. Several families avoided injury by sheltering inside vehicles or against building corners, but property losses were extensive, residents were displaced, and local livestock was killed. |
| Ban Khao tornado | 24 November 2025 | Ranot district, Songkhla | 1 | 2 injured | A tornado struck two villages in the Ban Khao subdistrict that resulted in more than 50 homes damaged, trees were uprooted, electrical poles were toppled, and two people were injured. |
| Thung Khwang tornado | 22 March 2026 | Phanat Nikhom District, Chon Buri | 1 | 1 injured | The tornado caused severe damage to several homes, tore off roofs and sent metal sheets and tiles into the air. Approximately 5 houses were damaged, leaving some structures completely exposed. |
| Nakhon Phanom tornado | 7 August 2026 | Nakhon Phanom | 1 | None | A waterspout struck Mueang Nakhon Phanom District, Nakhon Phanom Province, lifting metal sheet roofs from local storefronts and carrying them into the Mekong River. |
| Bang Rakam tornado | 28 September 2026 | Bang Rakam, Phitsanulok | 1 | None | The tornado formed in a rice field before striking residential areas. The winds ripped off corrugated metal roofs across a road, uprooted a large Indian almond tree, and scattered debris everywhere before the storm gradually dissipated. |
| Phop Phra tornado | 21 October 2026 | Phop Phra District, Tak | 1 | None | A tornado struck agricultural areas in Moo 4, Ruam Thai Phatthana Subdistrict. The storm damaged avocado and chili farms, snapping dozens of avocado trees and destroying crops ahead of harvest. |

== Vietnam ==
The country of Vietnam experiences multiple tornadoes annually. Between 1993 and 2000, there are a total number of 317 tornado occurrences in the country. Most of these tornadoes being F1 intensities in the Fujita scale (F scale), but a very few documented tornadoes are able to reach F3 intensities. They typically form during severe thunderstorms or typhoons. Tornadoes appear in almost every region in the country, with most tornadoes located in Southern Vietnam, followed by Northern Vietnam, and lastly Central Vietnam with the least amount of tornadoes reported. These tornadoes occur most frequently in May around the country. In the north and central regions, high concentrations of tornadic activity appear from March to May, with April being the most frequent. Meanwhile, tornadic activity in the southern regions span from June to August. To date, studies that involve the country's tornado climatology are limited.

The earliest-known tornado recorded in the country was in Chợ Lớn, Hồ Chí Minh City on 1 May 1904, accompanied by a typhoon. It overturned a train carriage, torn off the roof of a train depot, destroyed a thatch house, and killed a person. The deadliest tornado recorded was a waterspout in Diễn Châu district, Nghệ An where it struck fishing boats, killing 60 people.

== See also ==
- List of tornadoes and tornado outbreaks
- List of European tornadoes and tornado outbreaks
- Tornado records
- Tornadic waterspout
