= Bang Tabun =

Coordinates: 13.265805°N 99.941661°E

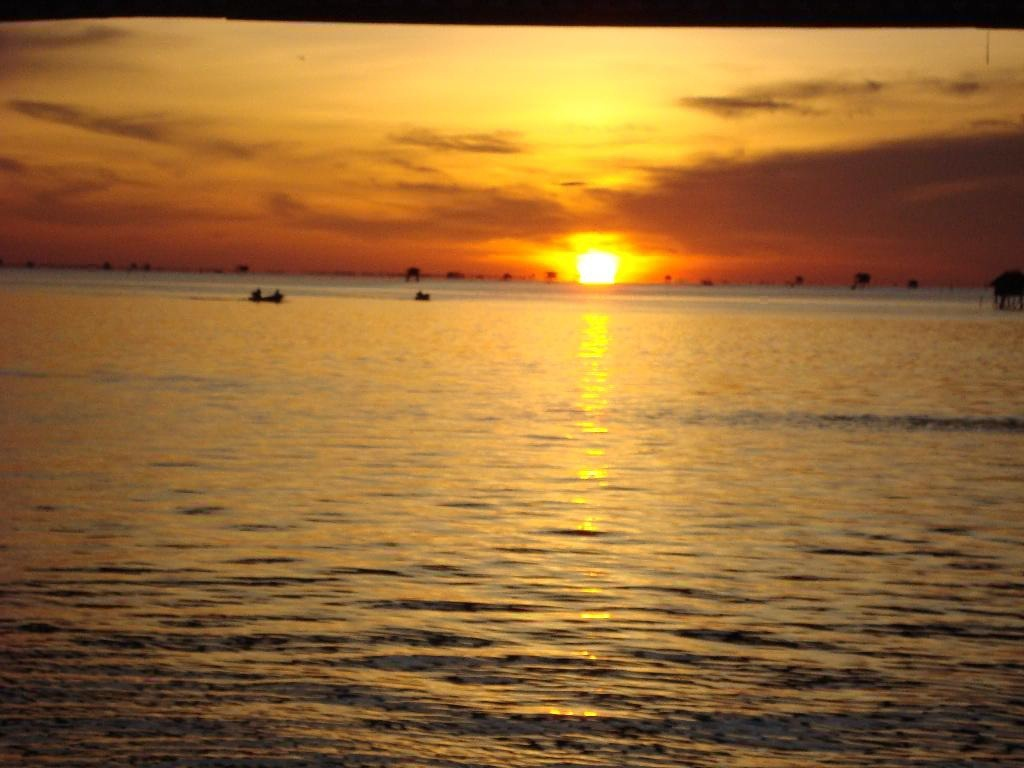
Sunset at Ao Bang Tabun

Bang Tabun (Thai: บางตะบูน, pronounced [bāːŋ tā.būːn]) is a coastal area of the Bay of Bangkok (upper Gulf of Thailand) occupying the area of Bang Tabun and Bang Tabun Ok Sub-districts, Ban Laem District of Phetchaburi Province, western Thailand.

== History & toponymy ==
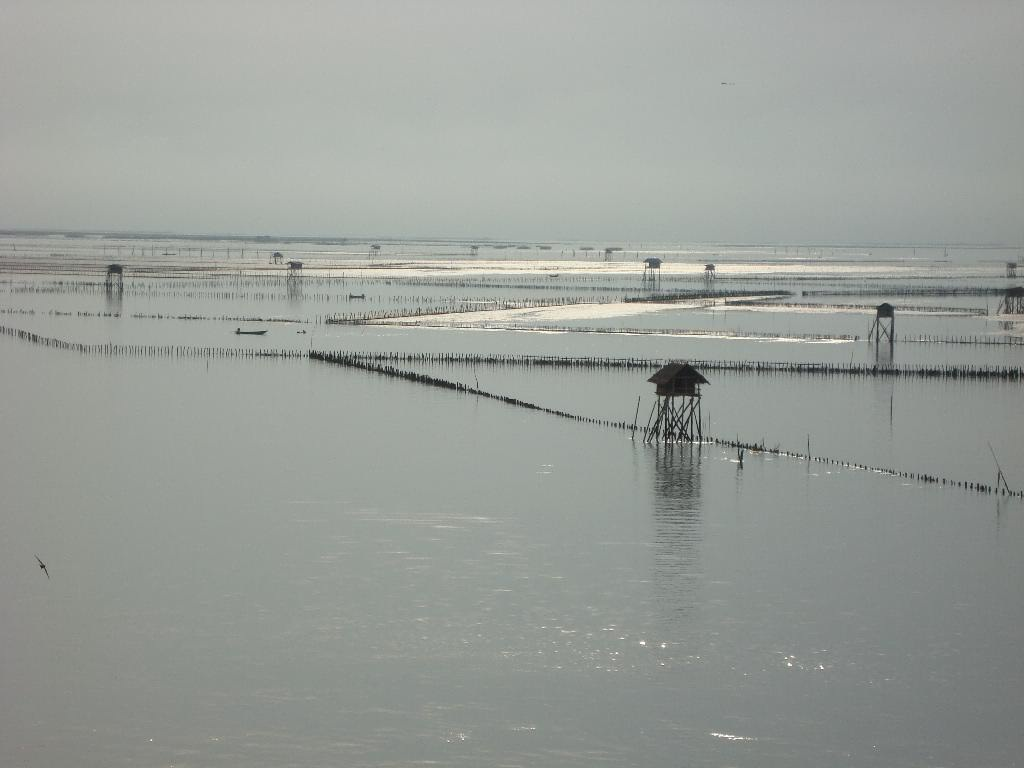
Ao Bang Tabun

The word Bang Tabun means "place of tabun trees", tabun is a Thai term for Xylocarpus granatum, a type of mangrove plant that grows heavily in this area.

Bang Tabun River or Khlong Bang Tabun, a tributary of the Phetchaburi River flows through the area and empties into the Ao Bang Tabun (part of Bay of Bangkok) here.

Bang Tabun is a waterside and coastline community that has been referenced in Thai history since the late Ayutthaya period. It was a place where King Suriyenthrathibodi (Sanphet VIII) come to fishing.

In the year 1831 corresponds to the early Rattanakosin period, Sunthorn Phu had traveled here and wrote a poem in his work entitled "Nirat Mueang Phet" (Journey to Phetchaburi).

== Geography ==
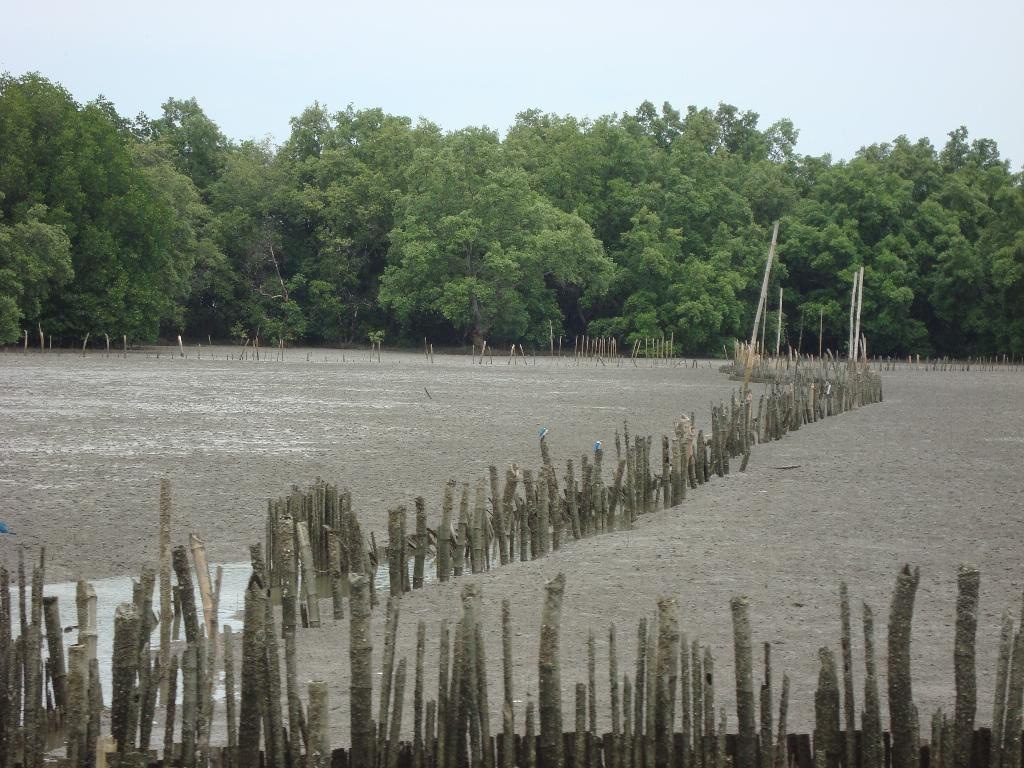
Blood cockle farming in Bang Tabun

Bang Tabun has a total area of 29.32 km^{2} (11.32 mi^{2}). It is about 12 km (7.5 mi) north of Ban Laem District Office, and 48 km (29.8 mi) from Puek Tian Beach.

Adjoining areas are (from the north clockwise): Yisan in Amphawa District of Samut Songkhram Province, Ao Bang Tabun and Bang Khrok in its district, Khao Yoi in Khao Yoi District of Phetchaburi Province, Yisan in Amphawa District of Samut Songkhram Province.

At the estuary where the Bang Tabun River empties into the sea is a large fertile mangrove forest and home to a fishing village. Bang Tabun River also branched into various waterways, such as Khlong Bang Bua, Khlong Lat, Khlong Hai Lam, etc.

== Administration ==
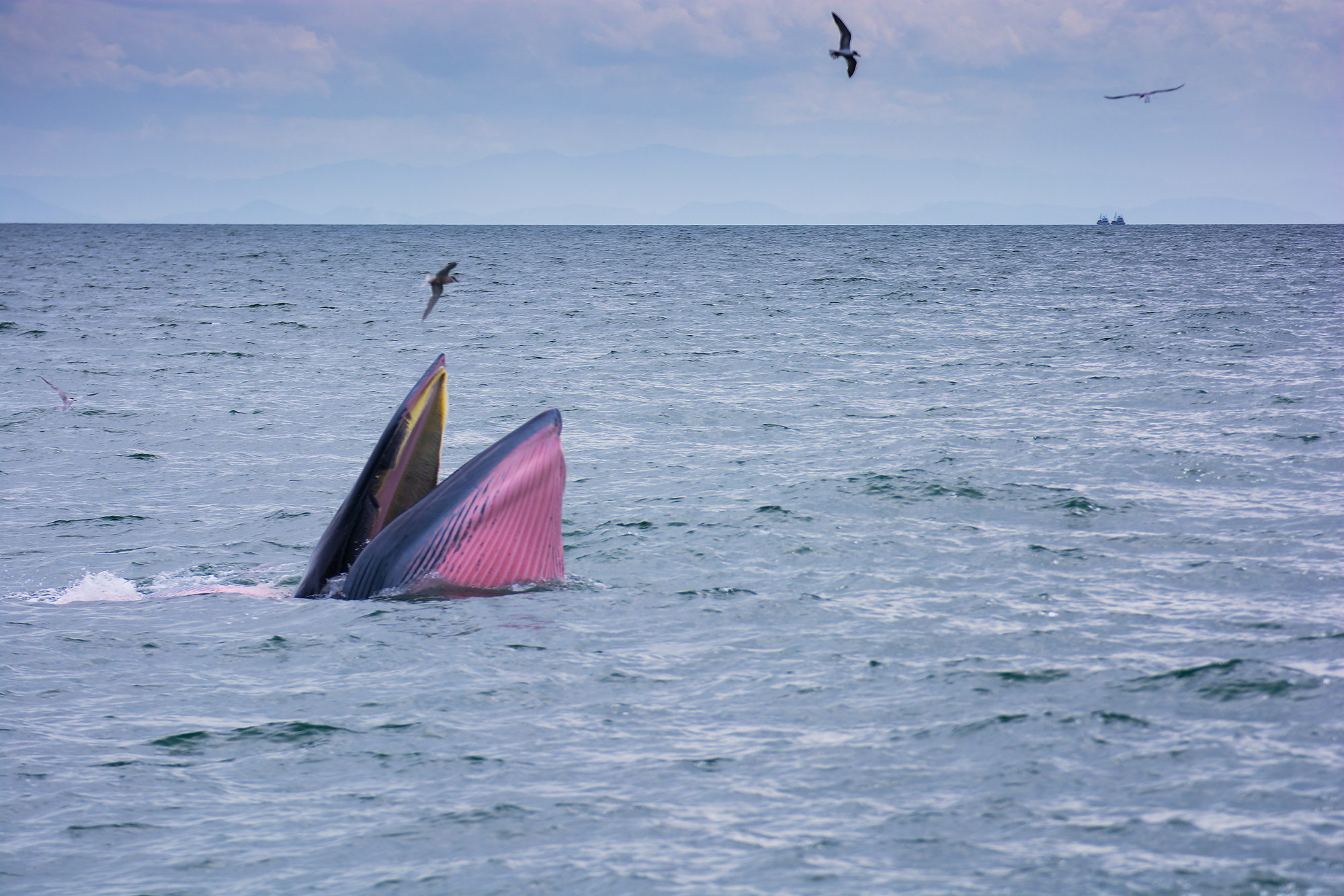
Bryde's whale that live in the Ao Bang Tabun

Bang Tabun has the status of a tambon (sub-district) of Ban Laem District, northeast of Phetchaburi Province. Only area of Bang Tabun is governed by the Subdistrict Administrative Organization (SAO) Bang Tabun (องค์การบริหารส่วนตำบลบางตะบูน).

Bang Tabun also consists of eight administrative mubans (village), with total of 911 households. While Bang Tabun Ok consists of five administrative mubans, with total of 705 households.

== Places ==
- Bang Tabun Wittaya School
- Wat Pak Ao Buddhist Temple
- The Bridge Over Ao Bang Tabun
- Bang Tabun Police Station
- Bang Tabun Health Center

=== Nearby places ===
- Laem Pak Bia
- Wat Khao Takrao Buddhist Temple
- Wat Nai Klang Buddhist Temple
- Bang Kaeo Scenic Viewpoint

== Tourism ==
Bang Tabun is now regarded as another tourist attraction of Phetchaburi. There are many restaurants and homestay resort-style accommodations available to visitors. Local people make a living by fisheries and raising blood cockles as well as other types of bivalves, such as mussels, oysters. The area is regarded as one of the largest blood cockle cultures in the country. Salted fish and dried seafood products are local good stuffs.

At the same time, it is a great place for birdwatching activities. Including a cruise out to the Ao Bang Tabun to see Bryde's whales.
