= Kangryong Field =

Wetland in North Korea

Coordinates: 37°54′00″N 125°36′00″E

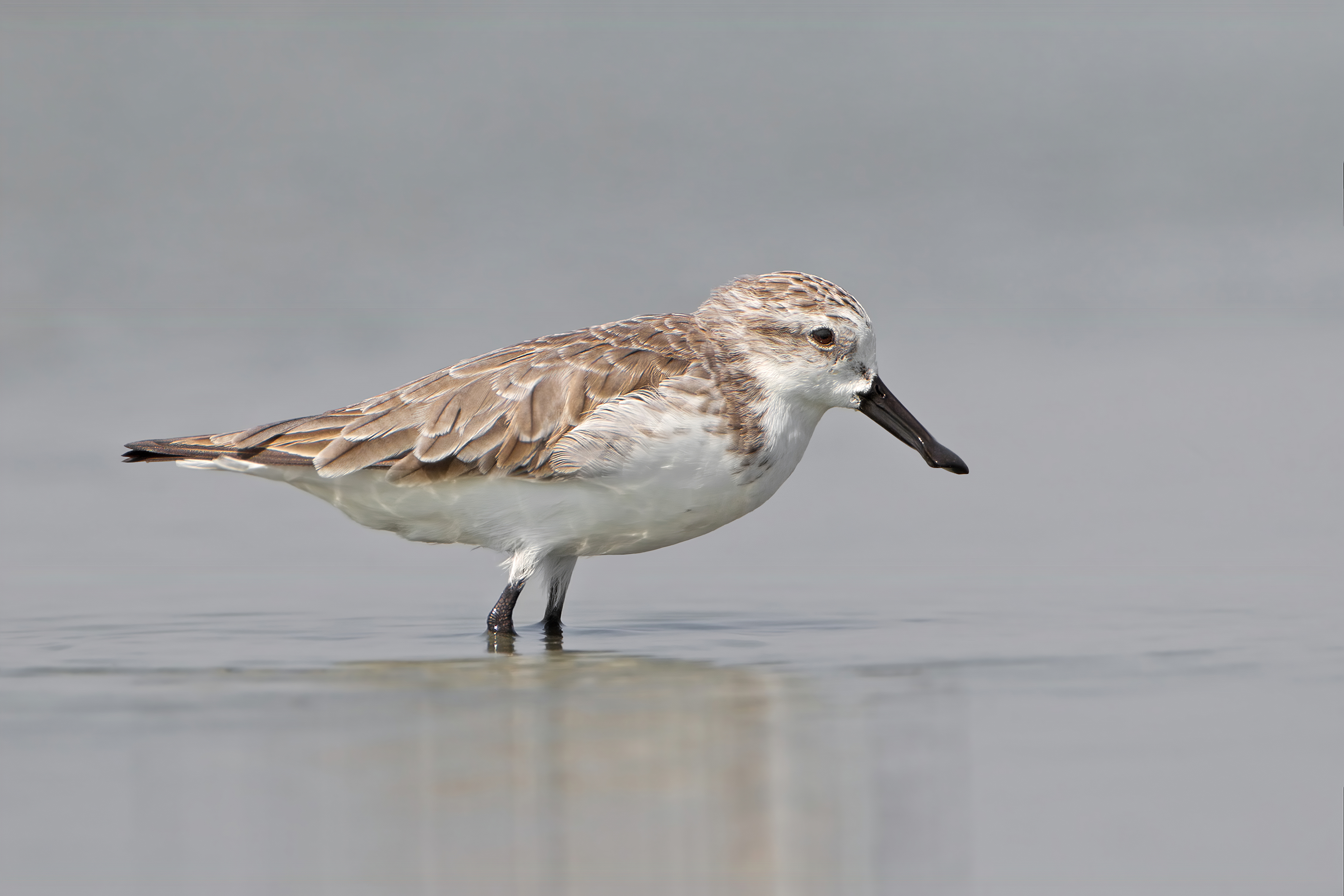
The site is important for spoon-billed sandpipers as passage migrants

Kangryong Field(강령흰두루미살이터) is a 1200 ha wetland site in South Hwanghae Province of North Korea. It has been identified by BirdLife International as an Important Bird Area (IBA) because it supports populations of Oriental storks, black-faced spoonbills, Chinese egrets, red-crowned cranes and spoon-billed sandpipers.
