= Sunthorn Phu Memorial =

Coordinates: 12.6751°N 101.6345°E

The Sunthorn Phu Memorial was built to commemorate Thai language poet Sunthorn Phu of the Rattanakosin era. His full name was Phra Sunthorn Wohan, known as Sunthorn Phu (or Phu). The Sunthorn Phu Memorial is a park in Klaeng District, Rayong Province, Thailand. It is believed to be his father's birthplace, sometimes mistaken as Sunthorn Phu's birthplace (which is in Bangkok).

== History ==
Sunthorn Phu Memorial Park is a 33.15-acre facility. The foundation stone was set on 30 December 1955 by Prime Minister Plaek Pibulsongkram, but construction stopped for 10 years, until 1968. The Rayong governor at that time was Vithya Kasetsaowapak, who donated 962,766.10 baht to purchase the land. It was completed on 5 March 1970 and had its opening on 25 May 1970.

== Events ==
- Fruit festival
- Clothing pagoda in the middle of the water
- Sunthorn Phu's birthday
- Taksin the Great's birthday

== Memorial ==
The memorial is on a hillside. Three sculptures surround the statue of Sunthorn Phu. The other sculptures represent the main characters in his literary works, including Prince Aphai Mani, the ocean butterfly, and the mermaid. Sukij Laidej created the Sunthorn Phu statue. Gaisorn Srisuwan sculpted Aphai Mani. Saroj Jaruc carved the mermaid, and Thana Laohathaikul executed the ocean butterfly.
