= Puek Tian Beach =

Beach in Thailand

Coordinates: 12°56′43.22″N 100°1′59.48″E

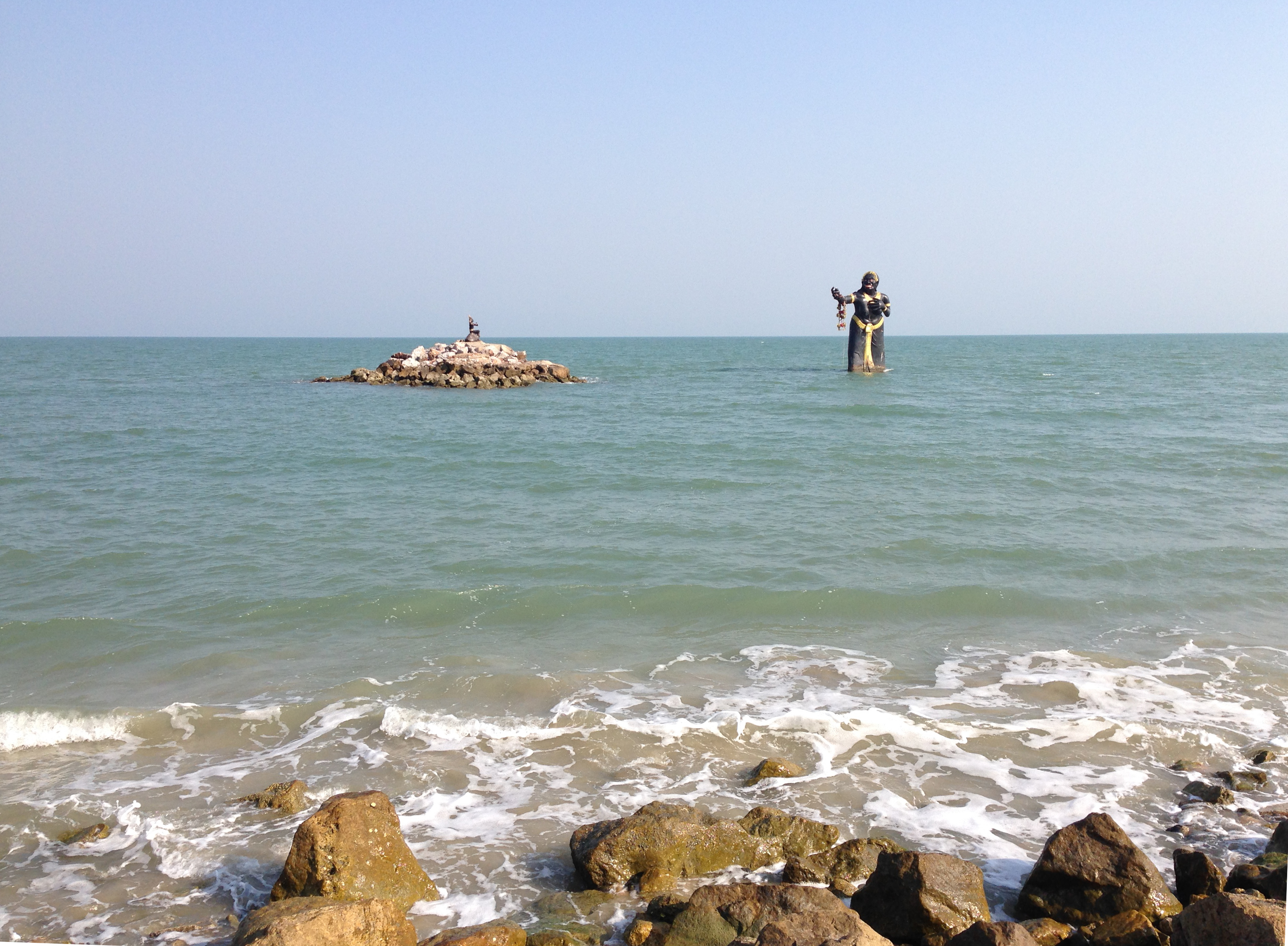
Puek Tian Beach and statue of Nang Phisuea Samudra

Puek Tian Beach (Thai: หาดปึกเตียน, RTGS: Hat Puek Tian, pronounced [hàːt pɯ̀k tīa̯n]) is a beach of the Gulf of Thailand, located in Tambon Puek Tian, Amphoe Tha Yang, Phetchaburi Province, western Thailand, about 21 km (13.5 mi) from City of Phetchaburi in the middle between Cha-am and Chao Samran Beaches.

Puek Tien is a beach that is different from the other, where it is quiet and not very crowded. Its highlights include the statue of the characters from Phra Aphai Mani, the masterpiece epic poem of Sunthon Phu such as Nang Phisuea Samudra (sea ogress), Nang Ngueak (mermaid) and main character Phra Aphai Mani, including other statues namely giant turtle and Chinese goddess Kuan Yin.

Believed that he had traveled here when he was ordained and impressed therefore used the beach as the backdrop of story.
