= Ban Laem district =

Ban Laem บ้านแหลม
- District
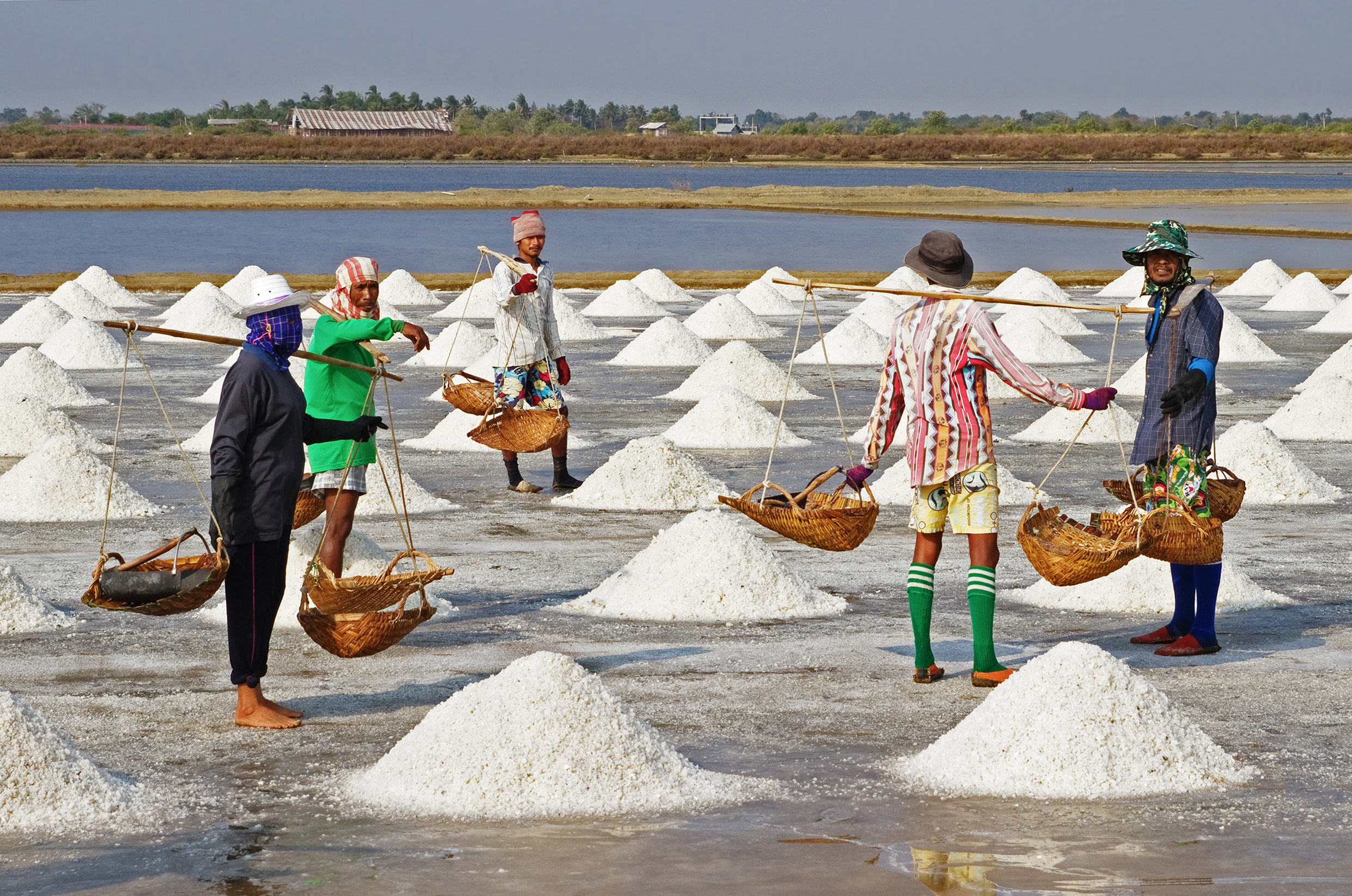
- Salt farmers at Pak Thale

- District location in Phetchaburi province
- Coordinates: 13°12′2″N 99°58′49″E
- Country: Thailand
- Province: Phetchaburi
- Seat: Ban Laem

Area
  - Total: 189.885 km^{2} (73.315 sq mi)

Population (2008)
  - Total: 54,068
  - Density: 290.7/km^{2} (753/sq mi)
- Time zone: UTC+7 (ICT)
- Postal code: 76110
- Geocode: 7607

Ban Laem (Thai: บ้านแหลม, pronounced [bâːn lɛ̌ːm]) is a district (amphoe) in the northeastern part of Phetchaburi province, western Thailand.

== History ==
Originally, the area were Khwaeng Khun Chamnan and Phrommasan under Mueang Phetchaburi District. They were combined and upgraded to a full district in 1904.

== Geography ==
Neighboring districts are (from the southwest clockwise) Mueang Phetchaburi and Khao Yoi of Phetchaburi Province, Amphawa, Mueang Samut Songkhram of Samut Songkhram province and the Bay of Bangkok.

== Administration ==
The district is divided into 10 sub-districts (tambons), which are further subdivided into 73 villages (mubans). There are two sub-district municipalities (thesaban tambon): Bang Tabun and Ban Laem. Ban Laem covers parts of tambon Ban Laem. Bang Tabun covers parts of tambon Bang Tabun and Bang Tabun Ok. There are a further nine tambon administrative organizations (TAO).

No.	Name	Thai	Villages	Pop.
1.	Ban Laem	บ้านแหลม	10	15,565
2.	Bang Khun Sai	บางขุนไทร	11	7,013
3.	Pak Thale	ปากทะเล	4	2,365
4.	Bang Kaeo	บางแก้ว	8	4,955
5.	Laem Phak Bia	แหลมผักเบี้ย	4	2,288
6.	Bang Tabun	บางตะบูน	8	4,177
7.	Bang Tabun Ok	บางตะบูนออก	5	3,078
8.	Bang Khrok	บางครก	12	6,936
9.	Tha Raeng	ท่าแร้ง	7	4,835
10.	Tha Raeng Ok	ท่าแร้งออก	4	2,856
