= Laem Phak Bia =

Coastal area in Phetchaburi Province, Thailand

Coordinates: 13°03′32″N 100°06′17″E

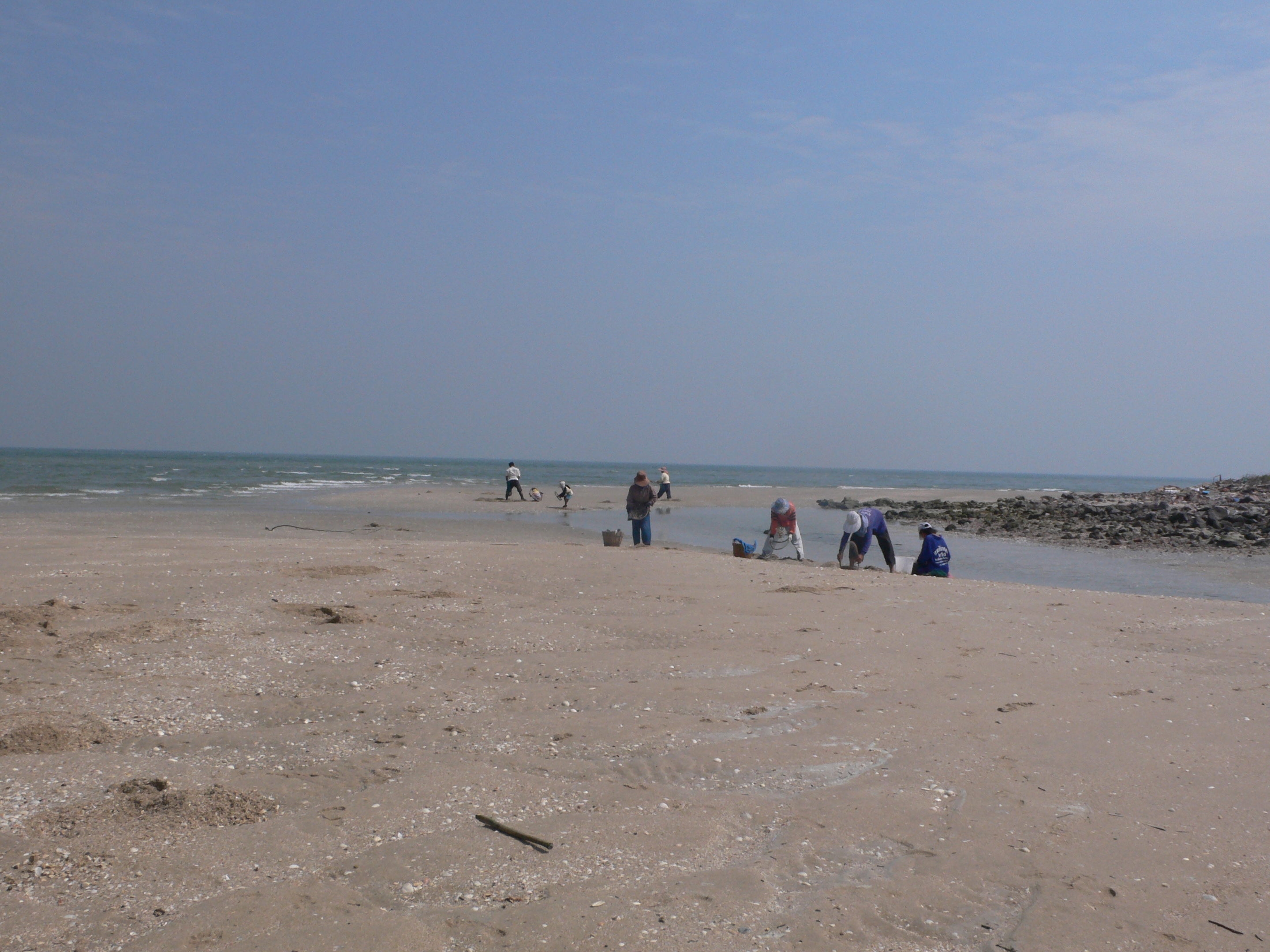
The sand spit at Laem Phak Bia

Laem Phak Bia (Thai: แหลมผักเบี้ย, pronounced [lɛ̌ːm pʰàk bîa̯]; lit. 'purslane point', formerly: Chulai Point) is a coastal area in Ban Laem District, Phetchaburi Province, Thailand. The shore is a large, open area of mudflats and salt pans, with some mangrove areas and scrub, tipped by a sand spit. The area is not a national park, the land being privately owned, but it is a favoured location for bird-watchers where they can see a wide variety of shorebirds. The area is administered as Laem Phak Bia Subdistrict, and is home to a village of the same name.

== Geography ==
Laem Phak Bia is located on the western shore of the northern end of the Gulf of Thailand in Phetchaburi Province, Thailand. A road runs parallel with the coast and provides access to the shore via various tracks. Near the village of Pak Thale in the north of the area lies the Pak Thale Shorebird Conservation Area and areas of salt evaporation ponds. South of this is the Laem Phak Bia Environmental Research and Development Project (known as the king's project), mudflats, patches of scrub and of mangroves, and a sand spit jutting out into the bay. Further south lies the village of Laem Phak Bia, and beyond that the beach resort of Hat Chao Samran which has accommodation and facilities for visitors.

== Fauna ==
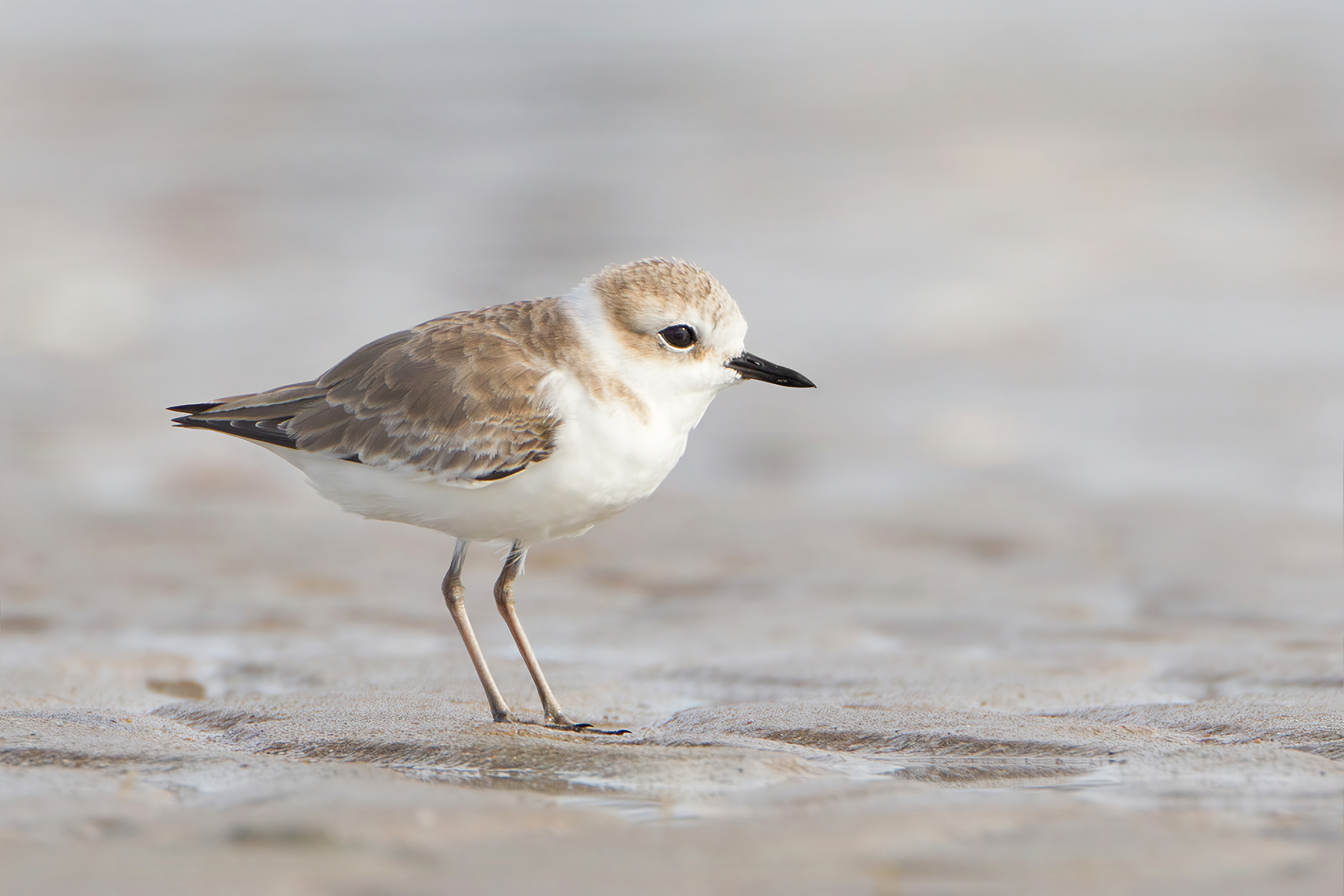
White-faced plover (Charadrius alexandrinus dealbatus) at Laem Phak Bia

This area is famed for its bird-watching opportunities. Important species include the critically endangered spoon-billed sandpiper, the endangered Nordmann's greenshank and black-faced spoonbill, and the white-faced plover. (Note: Include: Endangered:spoon-billed sandpiper, Nordmann's greenshank and black-faced spoonbill) On the saltpans nearby, the spoon-billed sandpiper is reliably present from November to March, inclusive, and the painted stork, the red-necked phalarope and the pied avocet can also often be seen. The sand spit is a wintering area for such gulls as the Pallas's gull, the Heuglin's gull and the Vega gull, and the Malaysian plover the Chinese egret are often present. Passerines that can be seen in the mangroves, swamps and enclosures at the research centre include the golden-bellied gerygone, the dusky warbler, the racket-tailed treepie, various reed warblers, the common snipe, the pin-tailed snipe, the ruddy-breasted crake and the slaty-breasted rail.

== Environment ==
Laem Phak Bia

This area receives effluent discharged by the Phetchaburi municipal wastewater treatment plant. The king's project has researched the heavy metal accumulations and how they can best be mitigated. The narrowleaf catstail (Typha angustifolia) has been found to accumulate large quantities of lead and remove the contamination from the soil.

A 2004 proposal to build the 50 km (31 mi) Laem Phak Bia bridge over the Bay of Bangkok, the northern tip of the Gulf of Thailand, were shelved in 2005 on environmental grounds after concern from King Bhumibol.
