= Kampung Tanjung Aru =

Kampung Tanjung Aru is a village in Federal Territory of Labuan, Malaysia.
