= Phisuea Samut =

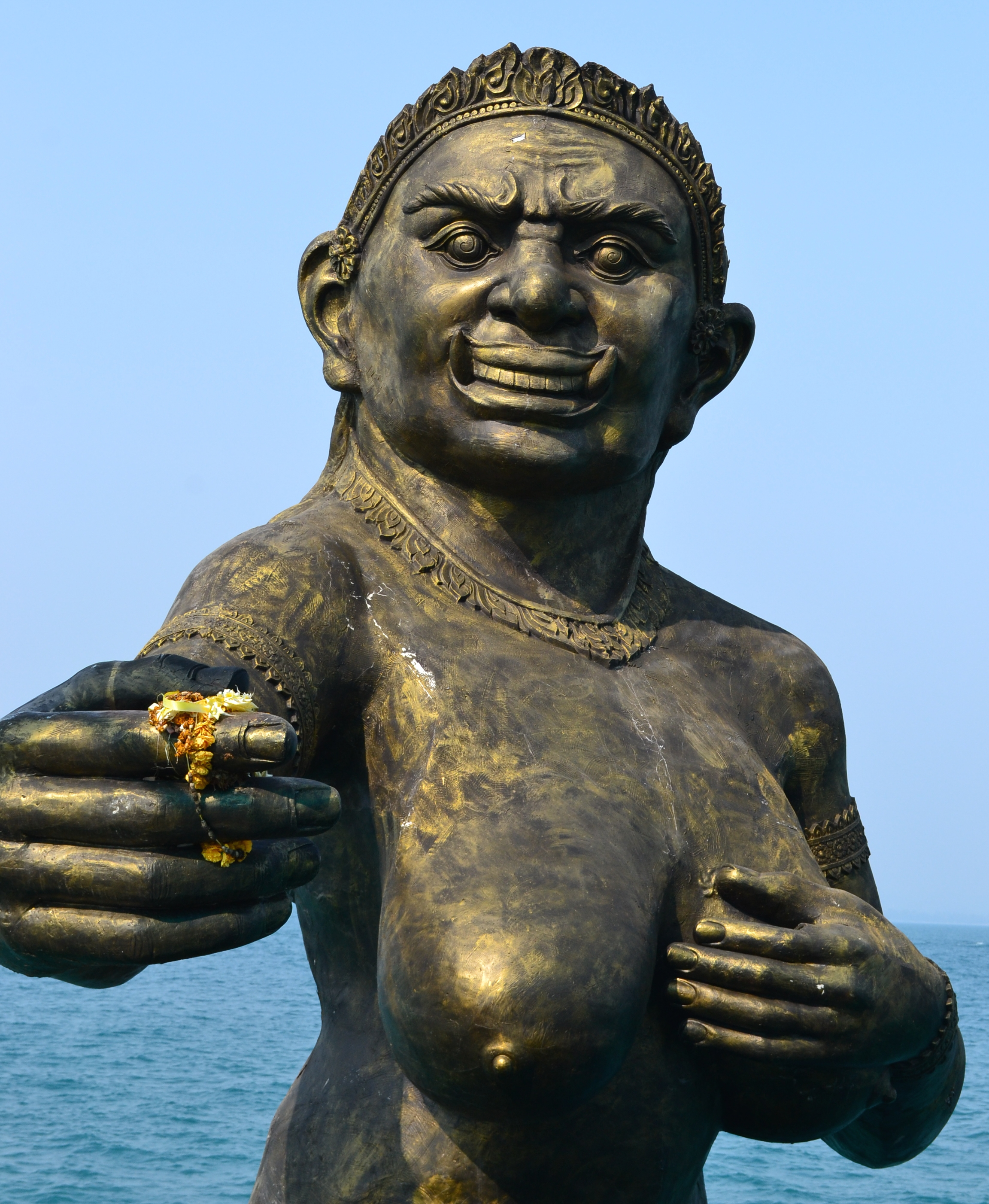
The statue of Phisuea Samut in Koh Samet, Thailand

Phisuea Samut, also known as Nang Phisuea Samudra (Thai: นางผีเสื้อสมุทร), is a sea ogress and main character from Phra Aphai Mani, the masterpiece epic poem of Sunthorn Phu. It is considered to be one of Thailand's national epics.

== Legend ==
According to the epic poem Phra Aphai Mani, Phisuea Samut is a sea ogress who lived in a cave beneath the sea. One day, Phra Aphai Mani, a prince from the Rattana Kingdom, was sent to study abroad by his father, with the intention of having him ascend to the throne after his death. Aphai is a master of playing a magical flute called Pi (ปี่), which had the power to put people to sleep or even kill them. Nang Phisuea Samudra was captivated by the beautiful music of the flute and decided to rise from the sea to find its source. When she finally met Aphai, she instantly fell in love with him and began plotting to marry him. While Aphai's companions were lulled to sleep by the sound of his flute, Phisuea Samudra disguised herself as a beautiful woman to be with him. Aphai knew all along that she was an ogress in disguise, but he was unable to escape. Aphai and Phisuea lived together and had a son named Sin Samudra (สินสมุทร). For eight years, Sin was kept isolated from the world until one day, Aphai revealed the truth about his mother to him and they devised a plan to escape. Aphai tricked Phisuea Samudra into going to meditate on a distant island and fasting for three days.

When Phisuea realized she had been deceived, she became agitated and lost her beauty, transforming back into an ogress. She wandered along the beach searching for her beloved. The story ends with Aphai managing to escape and arriving on a shore, where he played his magic flute, breaking Phisuea Samudra's heart and killing her.

The statues of Phisuea were erected on the shores of Koh Samet to commemorate her strong love. Her memorial statues can be found across Rayong province, where she was worshipped as a deity known as Mother Sea Butterfly. (Note: “Butterfly” (not an insect) is distorted from the word “ghost” and literally translates as “ancestral ghost”.) Her story is still part of popular Thai theater, and she is portrayed as a sad romantic figure.

== Gallery ==
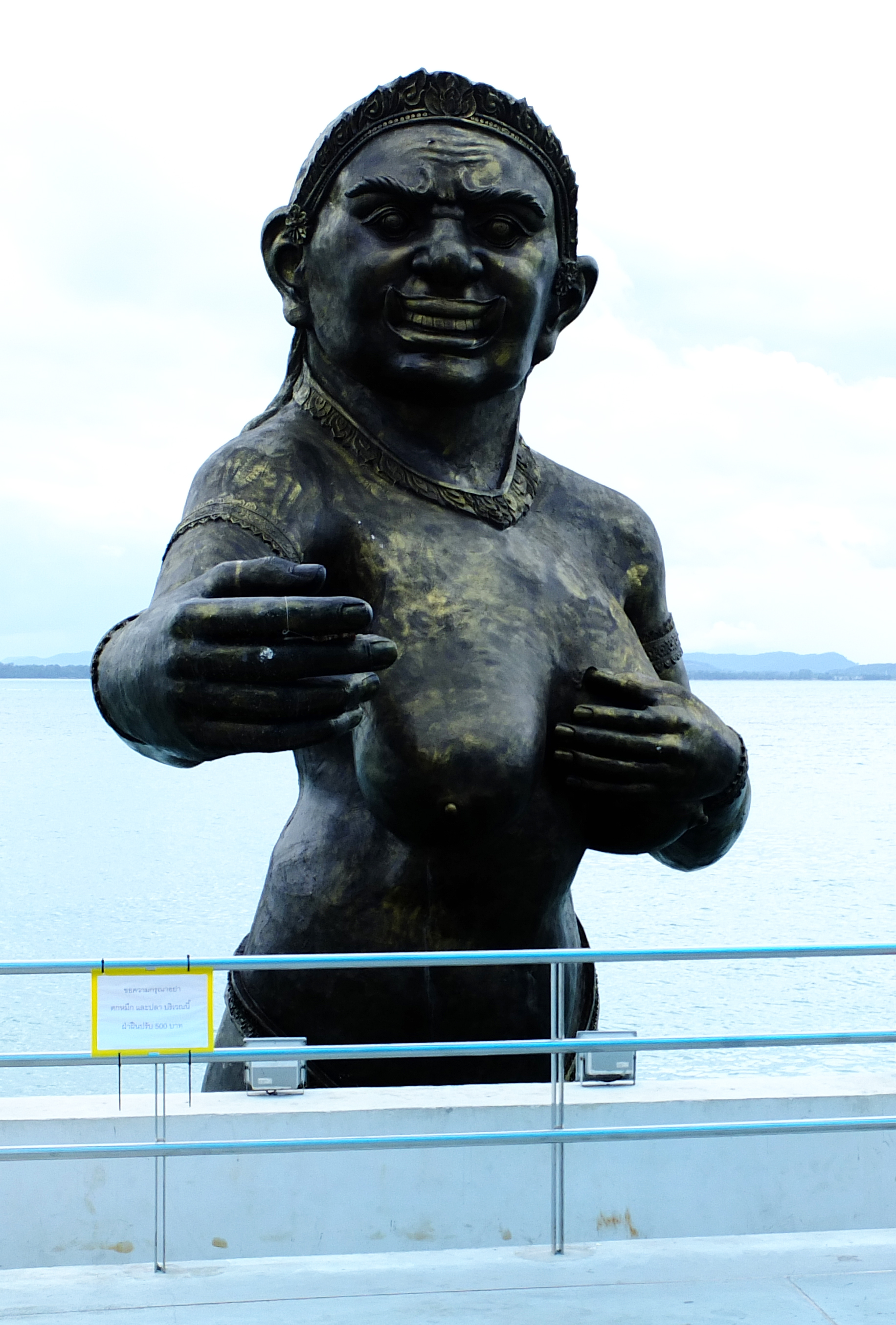
Welcoming statue of Phisuea Samut at the main port of Samet

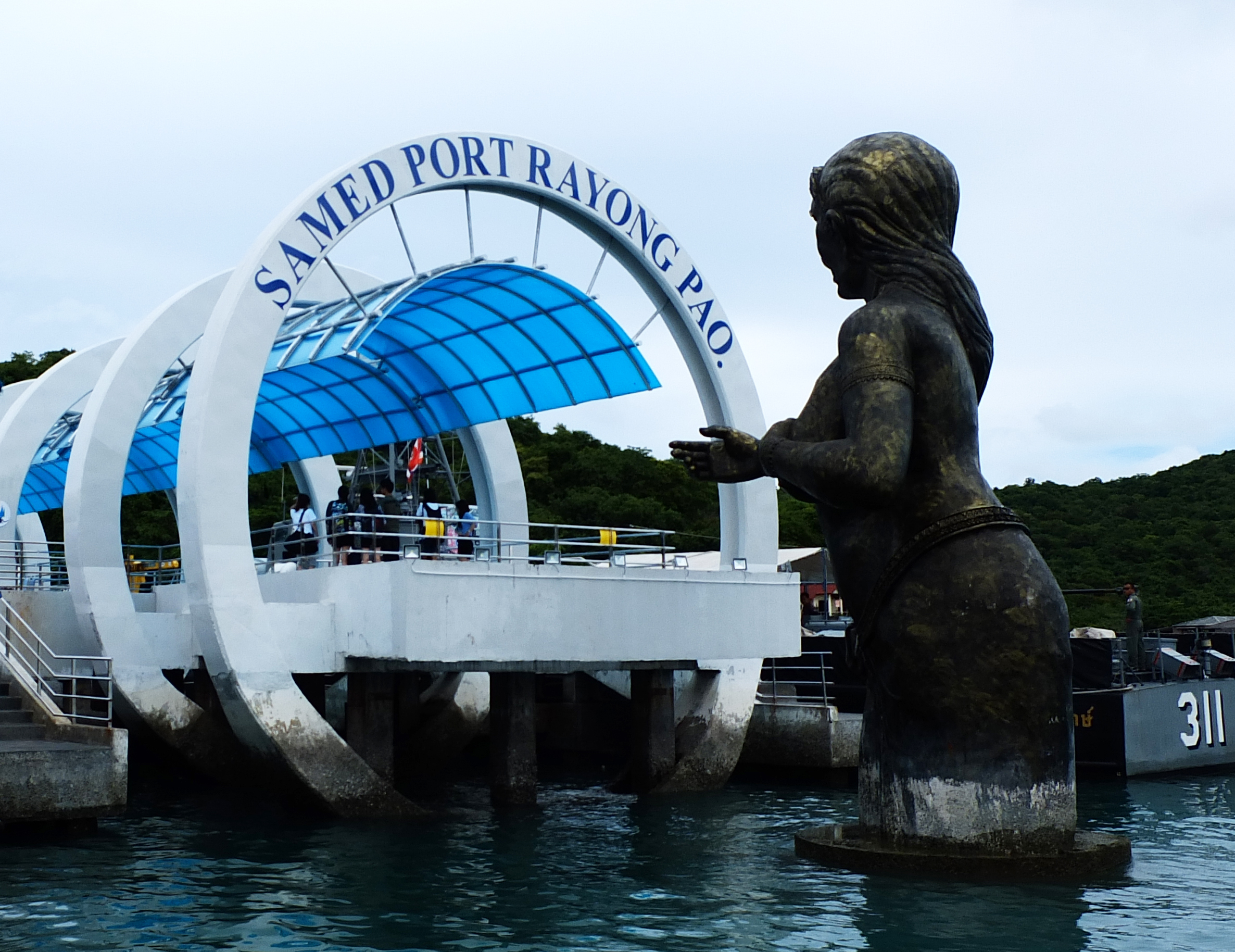
The statue at Samed Port

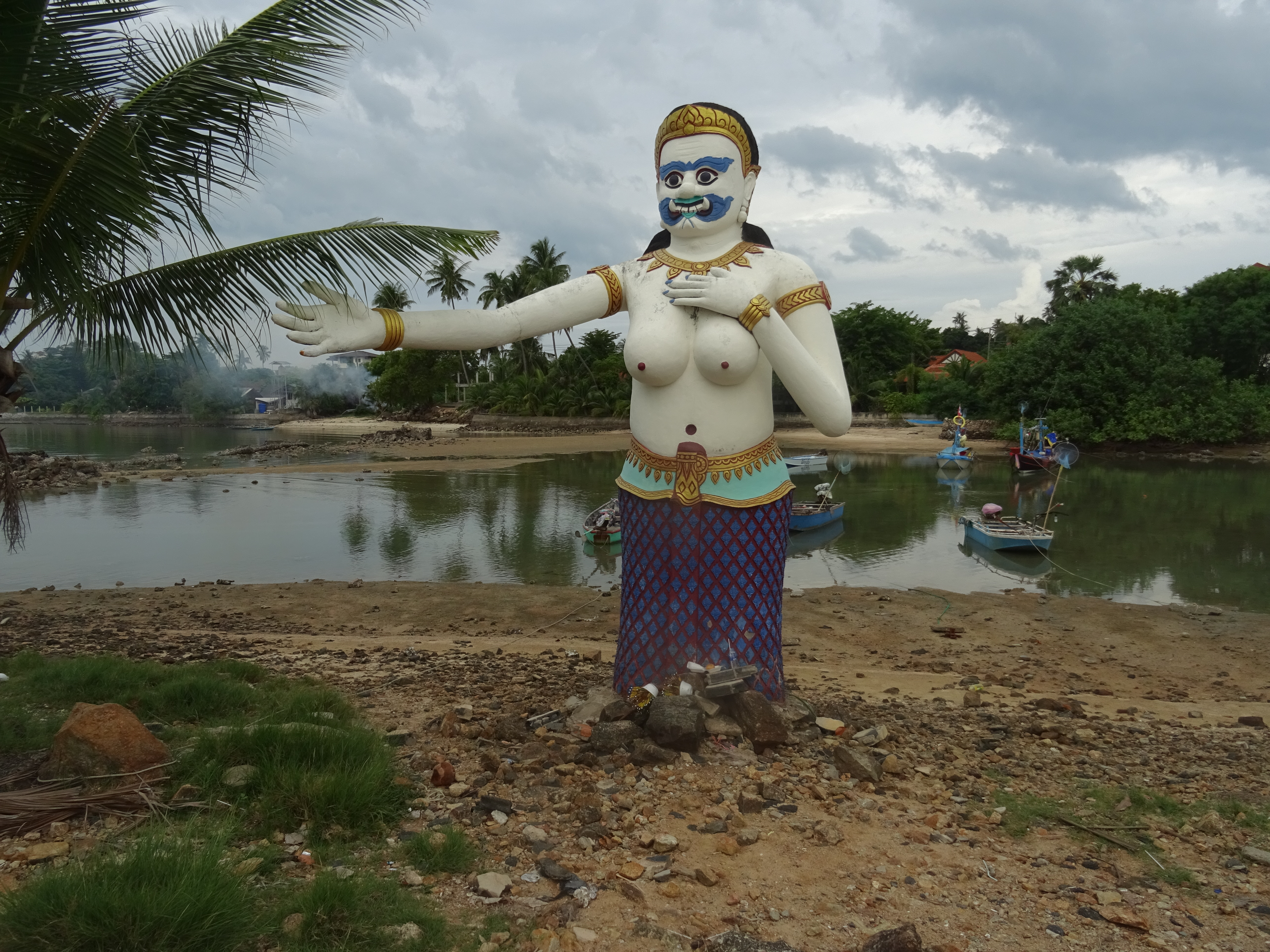
The statue of Phisuea Samut located at Wat Phra Yai in the north of Ko Samui, Thailand.

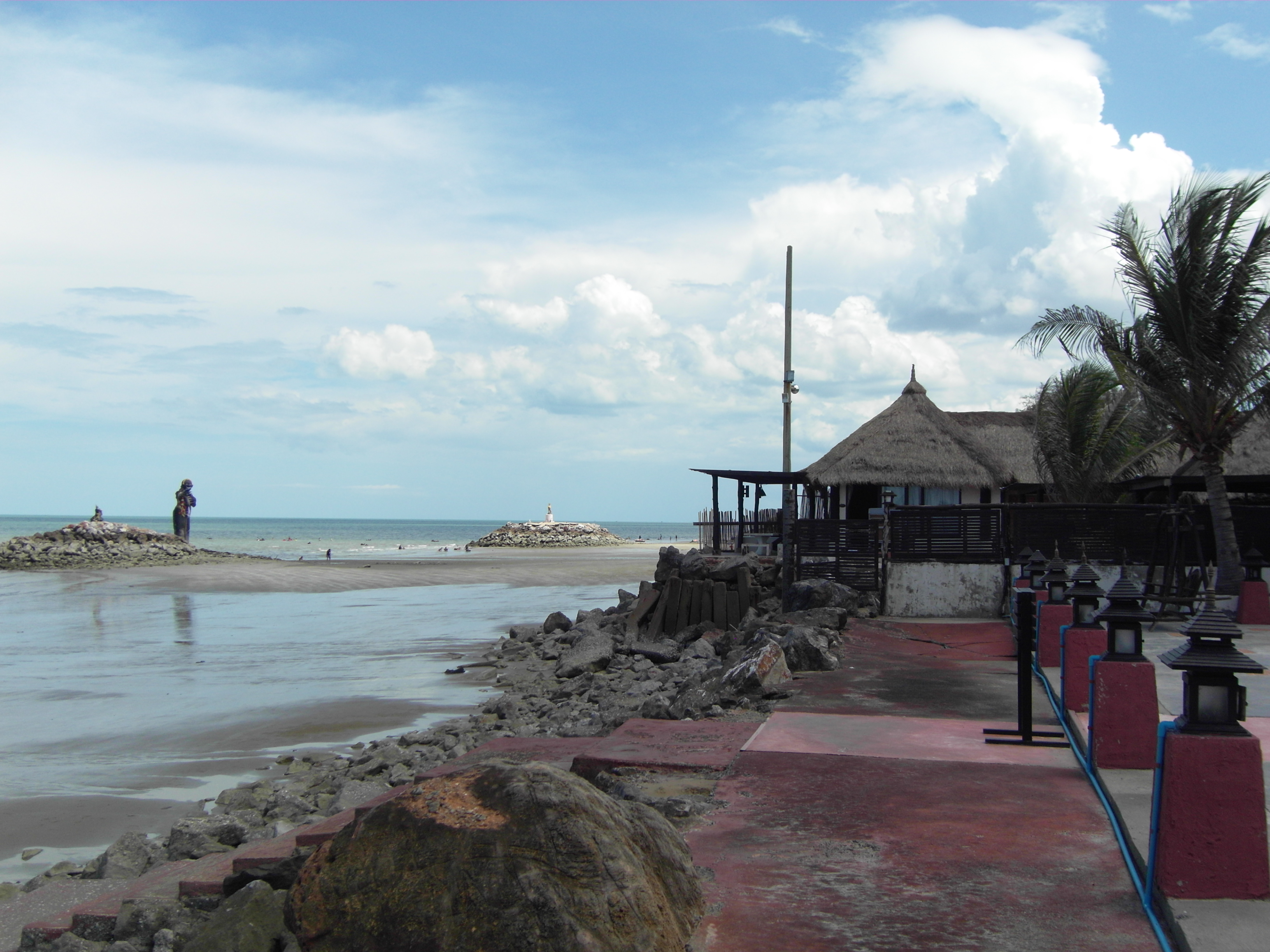
Puek Tian Beach and statue of Phisuea Samut
