= Mon Thong =

Mon Thong หมอนทอง
- tambon
- Interactive map of Mon Thong
- Country: Thailand
- Province: Chachoengsao
- District: Bang Nam Priao

Government
  - Type: Town municipality
  - Body: Mon Thong Subdistrict Municipality

Area
  - Total: 53.85 km^{2} (20.79 sq mi)

Population (2024)
  - Total: 10,638
  - Density: 197.54/km^{2} (511.6/sq mi)
- Time zone: UTC+7 (ICT)
- Postal code: 24150
- Website: https://mhontong.go.th

Mon Thong (Thai: หมอนทอง) is a subdistrict (tambon) in Bang Nam Priao District, Chachoengsao Province, Thailand. It was formerly administered by the Mon Thong Subdistrict Administrative Organization. In 2025, it was upgraded to Mon Thong Subdistrict Municipality. The area is the location of the Bang Nam Priao District Public Health Office and Bang Nam Priao Hospital.

== Geography ==
Mon Thong is bordered by the following subdistricts:

- North – Singto Thong
- East – Yothaka and Bang Khanak
- South – Phrong Akat and Bang Nam Priao
- West – Don Chimphli

== Administration ==
Mon Thong is divided into 11 administrative villages (muban).
