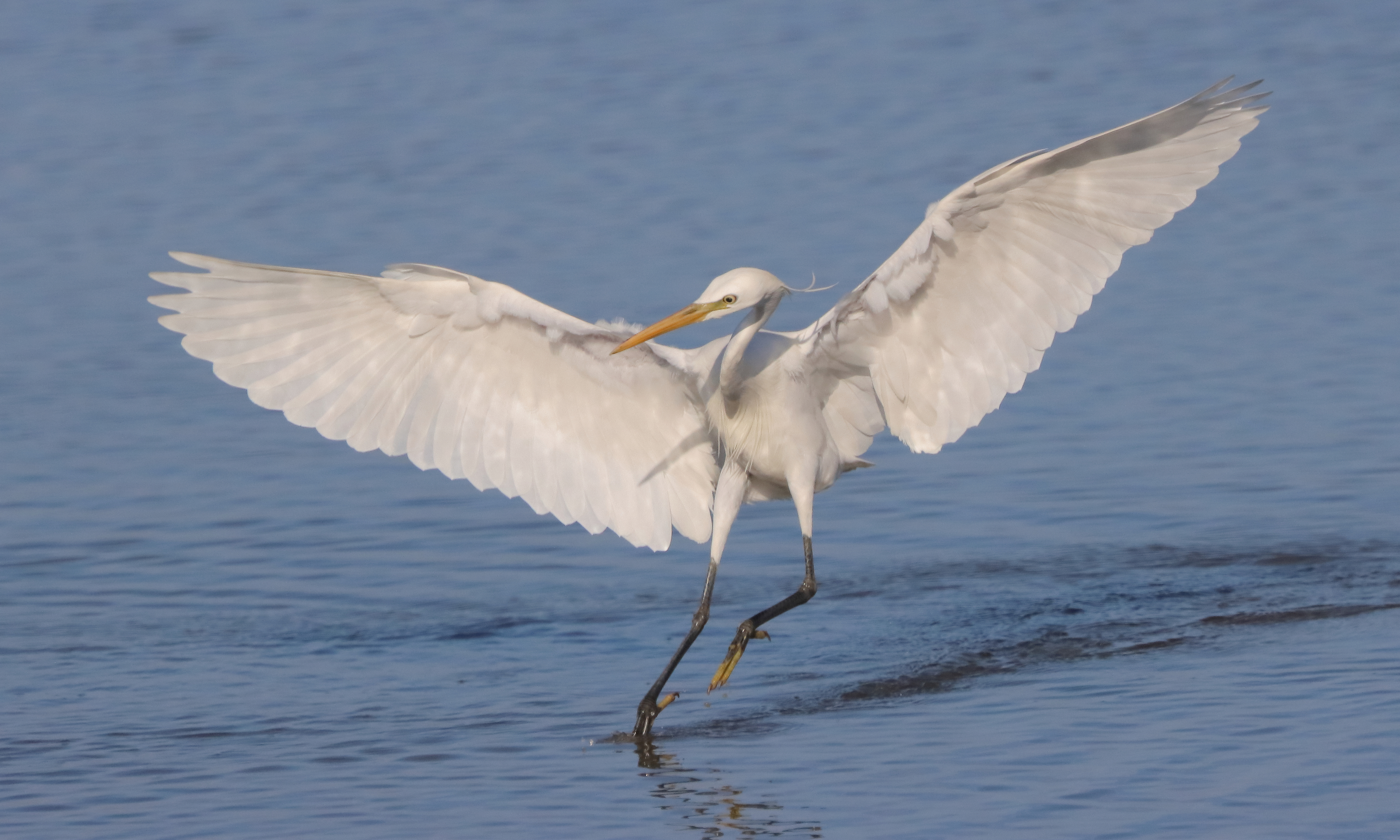
- In Zengwen River, Taiwan

Conservation status
- Vulnerable (IUCN 3.1)

Scientific classification
- Kingdom: Animalia
- Phylum: Chordata
- Class: Aves
- Order: Pelecaniformes
- Family: Ardeidae
- Genus: Egretta
- Species: E. eulophotes

Binomial name
- Egretta eulophotes (R. Swinhoe, 1860)
- Yellow: breeding, green: year-round, blue: nonbreeding

= Chinese egret =

Species of bird

The Chinese egret or Swinhoe's egret (Egretta eulophotes) is a threatened species of egret from east Asia, first described by Robert Swinhoe in 1860.

== Description ==
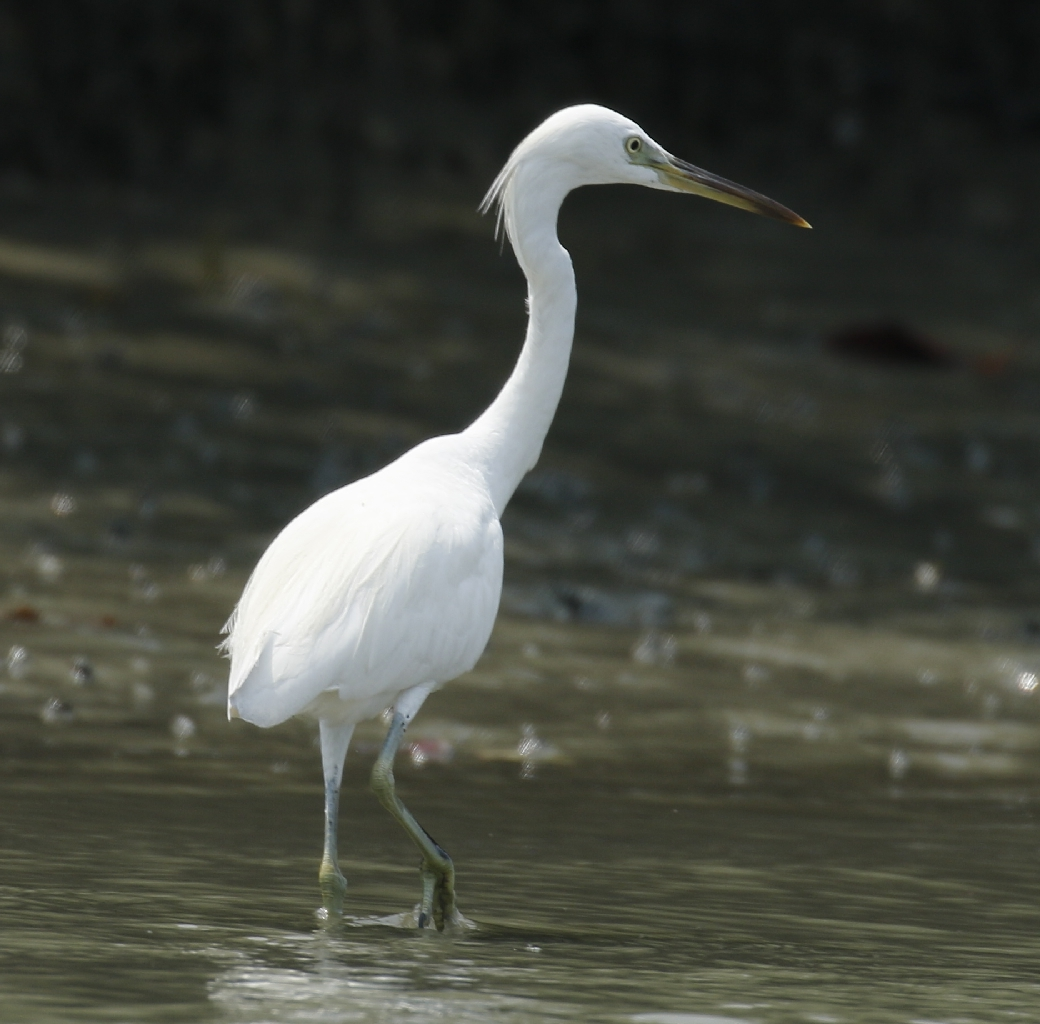
Laem Pak Bia, Thailand

The Chinese egret averages 68 cm in height. The plumage is white throughout the bird's life and resembles the little egret (Egretta garzetta). Outside the breeding season the bill is dusky with the basal portion being tannish peach and the lores and legs yellow green, while the iris is yellow. All individuals are similar in this season. In the breeding season the adults develop a luxuriant crest which is sometimes over 11 cm long. It also develops long lanceolate plumes on its breast and dorsal plumes extending beyond the tail, called aigrettes and similar to those of little egret. The bare parts change too, the bill becomes a bright, almost orange, yellow while the lores turn bright blue and the legs black with yellow feet.

== Distribution and population ==
The Chinese egret breeds on small islands off the coasts of far eastern Russia, North Korea, South Korea and mainland China. It formerly bred in Taiwan and the New Territories of Hong Kong although it is now only a non-breeding visitor or passage migrant to these countries. It is also a non-breeding passage migrant or winterer in Japan, the Philippines, Vietnam, Thailand, Peninsular Malaysia, Sarawak, Singapore, Indonesia and Brunei. The most important wintering areas are the Eastern Visayas, i.e. the islands of Leyte, Bohol and Cebu in the Philippines, and the Malaysian states of Sarawak and Selangor where between one third and a half of the world population are believed to winter, based on the results of a winter census undertaken in 2004/05. The total population is estimated at 2,600–3,400 individuals. During the decade from 2002 to 2012 there was no significant decline in the population of this species, and there are newly discovered colonies off the coast of southern China which may represent increased observer effort, but could also indicate a real growth in the population.

It is classified as a vulnerable species, mostly threatened by habitat loss.

== Habitat ==
Outside the breeding season the Chinese egret occurs in shallow tidal estuaries, mudflats and bays, occasionally visiting rice fields and fish ponds. All recent breeding records have been from offshore islands.

== Behavior ==
In South Korea the first returning Chinese egrets, almost always already in full-breeding plumage, start to arrive back in mid-April. Their first appearance is in small numbers on offshore islands, especially in stormy weather, with immigration over by mid-May. The period of spring migration is therefore rather short, and most birds are thought to arrive in their Korean breeding colonies without staging anywhere along the Korean coast. The autumn migration is rather more leisurely with many egrets appearing to move southward along the west coast during August and September, before departing Korea probably out through the southwest of the peninsula across the Yellow Sea.

Other Chinese egrets probably move westward directly across from Gyeonggi Bay toward the Shandong Peninsula, and then down the Chinese coast. During August and September 1998 two survey circuits were conducted along most of the west and south coast of South Korea and provided some insight into the suspected autumn migration strategy, with around 475 Chinese egrets found between August 18 and September 2, increasing to 615 between September 13 and 28. Most were found in the northwestern Gyeonggi Bay, which also holds most of South Korea's breeding birds, but significant counts were made at several more southern sites, especially in the second survey circuit.

== Conservation ==
The nuptial plumes of the Chinese egret, like other egrets, were in demand for decorating hats. They had been used for this purpose since at least the 17th century but in the 19th century it became a major craze and the number of egret skins passing through dealers reached into the millions. This is thought to have contributed to the decline of all of the white Egretta species. The greatest modern threat is habitat loss and reclamation of tidal flats and estuarine habitats, and through pollution.
