= Simpang Empat, Kedah =

Town in Kota Setar, Kedah, Malaysia

- Town
- Location in Malaysia
- Coordinates: 6°01′N 100°23′E
- Country: Malaysia
- State: Kedah

Simpang Empat in Kota Setar District

Simpang Empat or Simpang Ampat is a small town in Kota Setar District, Kedah, Malaysia.
