= Bay of Bangkok =

Bay in the Gulf of Thailand

- อ่าวกรุงเทพ (Thai)
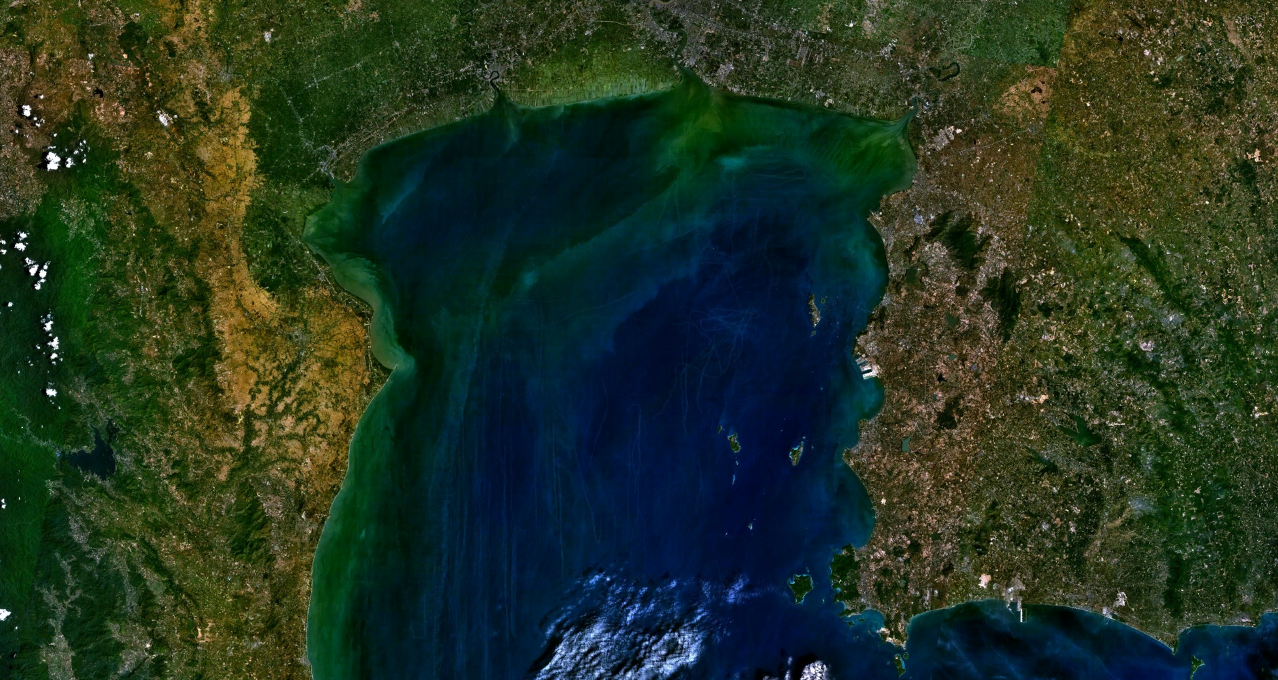
- NASA picture of the Bay of Bangkok

- Location within Thailand
- Interactive map of Bay of Bangkok
- Map of the Bay of Bangkok
- Location: Thailand
- Coordinates: 13°04′N 100°30′E
- Type: Bay
- Primary inflows: Mae Klong; Bang Tabun; Tha Chin; Chao Phraya River
- Primary outflows: Gulf of Thailand
- Max. length: 100 km (62 mi)
- Max. width: 100 km (62 mi)
- Surface area: 8,640 km^{2} (3,340 sq mi)
- Average depth: 58 m (190 ft)
- Max. depth: 85 m (279 ft)

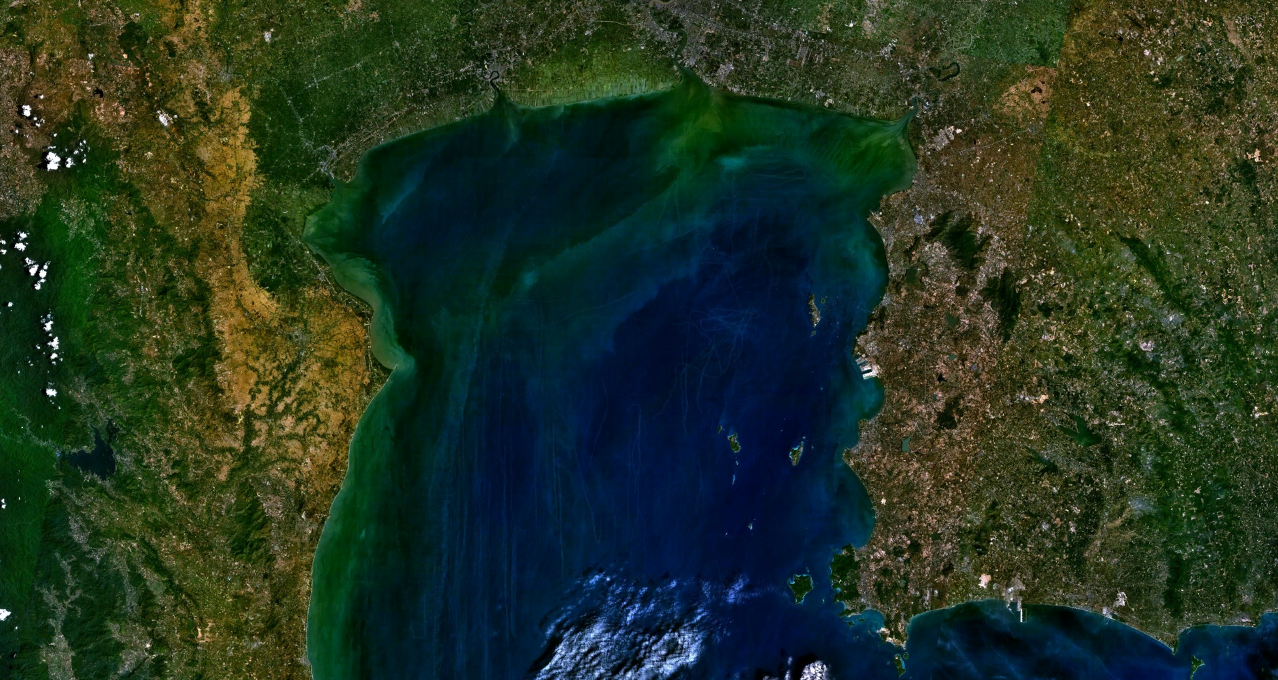
NASA picture of the Bay of Bangkok

The Bay of Bangkok (Thai: อ่าวกรุงเทพ, RTGS: Ao Krung Thep, Thai pronunciation: [ʔàːw kruŋ tʰêːp], sometimes informally อ่าวตัว ก), also known as the Bight of Bangkok, is the northernmost part of the Gulf of Thailand, roughly extending from Hua Hin District to the west and Sattahip District to the east. Three of the major rivers of central Thailand empty into the bay - the Chao Phraya and its distributary Tha Chin, the Mae Klong and the Bang Pakong River. The bay forms the coast of 8 provinces, them being clockwise: Prachuap Khiri Khan, Phetchaburi, Samut Songkhram, Samut Sakhon, Bangkok, Samut Prakan, Chachoengsao, and Chonburi.

There are some islands off the eastern shores of the bay, like Ko Sichang, Ko Lan and Ko Phai.

== Environment ==
The water quality of the Bay of Bangkok is rated as "very poor" by the Pollution Control Department.

Due to rising sea levels caused by climate change, coastal cities are at risk of flooding. In September and October 2023, Thailand began experiencing torrential rainfall.

Pattaya has frequently suffered from flooding. Under mayor Poramet Ngampichet, Pattaya has undergone drainage projects to reduce the flooding. Flooding has caused Pattaya Beach to become eroded, washing large quantities of sand into the bay. Eroded sand is then replaced by the Marine Department of Thailand.

=== Marine life ===
On 8 September 2023, following a series of monsoons, part of the Chonburi provincial coast experienced a plankton boom killing off numerous marine life such as ponyfishes, crabs, pufferfishes, and tilapias.

The bay is also a habitat for Bryde's whales. In early November 2020, an almost perfectly preserved skeleton of a Bryde's whale was discovered on the coast of Ban Phaeo district, Samut Sakhon. Carbon dating by a palaeobiological lab in the United States dated the skeleton to be about 3,380 years old. The National University of Singapore said that the skeleton added to evidence of significant sea level changes around 6,000 to 3,000 years ago in the Bay of Bangkok.

A survey by the Department of Marine and Coastal Resources from 27 to 30 November of the coast of the Bay of Bangkok discovered the presence of three more Bryde's whales, increasing the population in the bay to nine.

On 15 December 2023, 3D-printed artificial reefs were placed off Ko Sak island off Pattaya near Koh Lan.

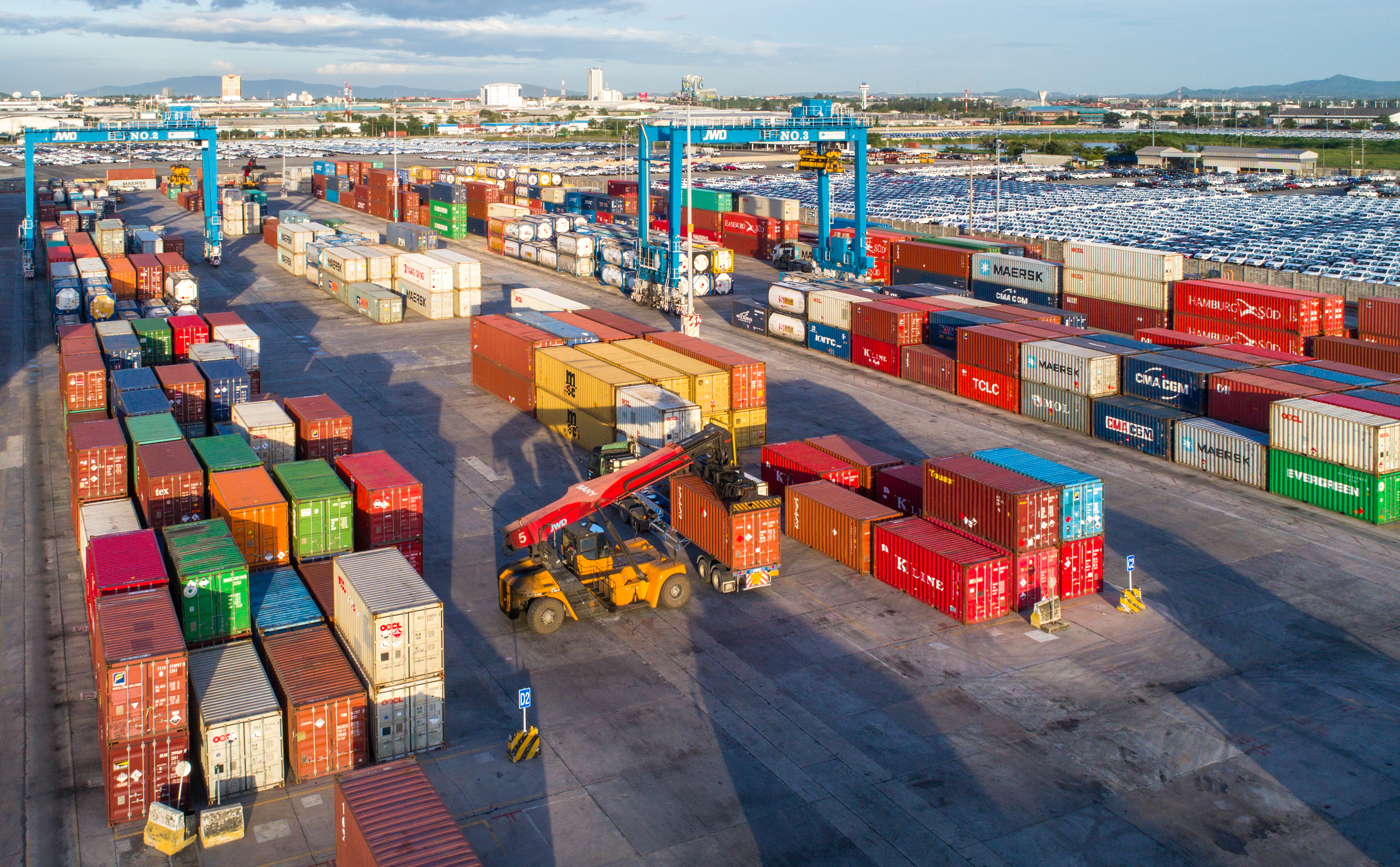
Shipping containers at Laem Chabang port

== Climate ==
Climate data for Bay of Bangkok (Bangkok Pilot Station), 1991–2020 normals)
Month	Jan	Feb	Mar	Apr	May	Jun	Jul	Aug	Sep	Oct	Nov	Dec	Year
Mean daily maximum °C (°F)	29.2 (84.6)	29.6 (85.3)	30.2 (86.4)	31.4 (88.5)	31.6 (88.9)	31.2 (88.2)	30.6 (87.1)	30.5 (86.9)	30.6 (87.1)	30.7 (87.3)	30.4 (86.7)	29.2 (84.6)	30.4 (86.8)
Daily mean °C (°F)	27.0 (80.6)	27.8 (82.0)	28.8 (83.8)	29.9 (85.8)	30.1 (86.2)	29.8 (85.6)	29.3 (84.7)	29.1 (84.4)	28.9 (84.0)	28.7 (83.7)	28.2 (82.8)	26.9 (80.4)	28.7 (83.7)
Mean daily minimum °C (°F)	25.0 (77.0)	26.1 (79.0)	27.3 (81.1)	28.1 (82.6)	27.9 (82.2)	27.6 (81.7)	27.4 (81.3)	27.1 (80.8)	26.4 (79.5)	26.1 (79.0)	25.9 (78.6)	24.5 (76.1)	26.6 (79.9)
Average precipitation mm (inches)	14.8 (0.58)	16.3 (0.64)	28.8 (1.13)	52.1 (2.05)	126.5 (4.98)	105.3 (4.15)	89.6 (3.53)	109.8 (4.32)	217.8 (8.57)	185.0 (7.28)	32.3 (1.27)	8.2 (0.32)	986.5 (38.82)
Average precipitation days (≥ 1.0 mm)	1.5	1.1	2.1	3.5	8.5	9.1	8.6	10.1	13.8	12.0	2.9	1.0	74.2
Average relative humidity (%)	70.6	74.3	76.4	75.8	74.1	73.3	73.7	74.4	75.9	74.8	69.0	66.8	73.3
Source: World Meteorological Organization

== Economy ==
The coastline of the Bay of Bangkok is occupied by several major cities such as Hua Hin, Pattaya, Si Racha and Laem Chabang. Laem Chanang is one of the most of important ports in Thailand and can handle 7.7 million twenty-foot equivalent units (TEU). North of Laem Chabang are the Si Racha oil terminals, which is a major port for oil importation into Thailand. Si Racha has a total capacity of 275,000 barrels a day. Smaller ports include the Port of Koh Si Chang on Koh Si Chang. The bay also provides international access to the Port of Bangkok.

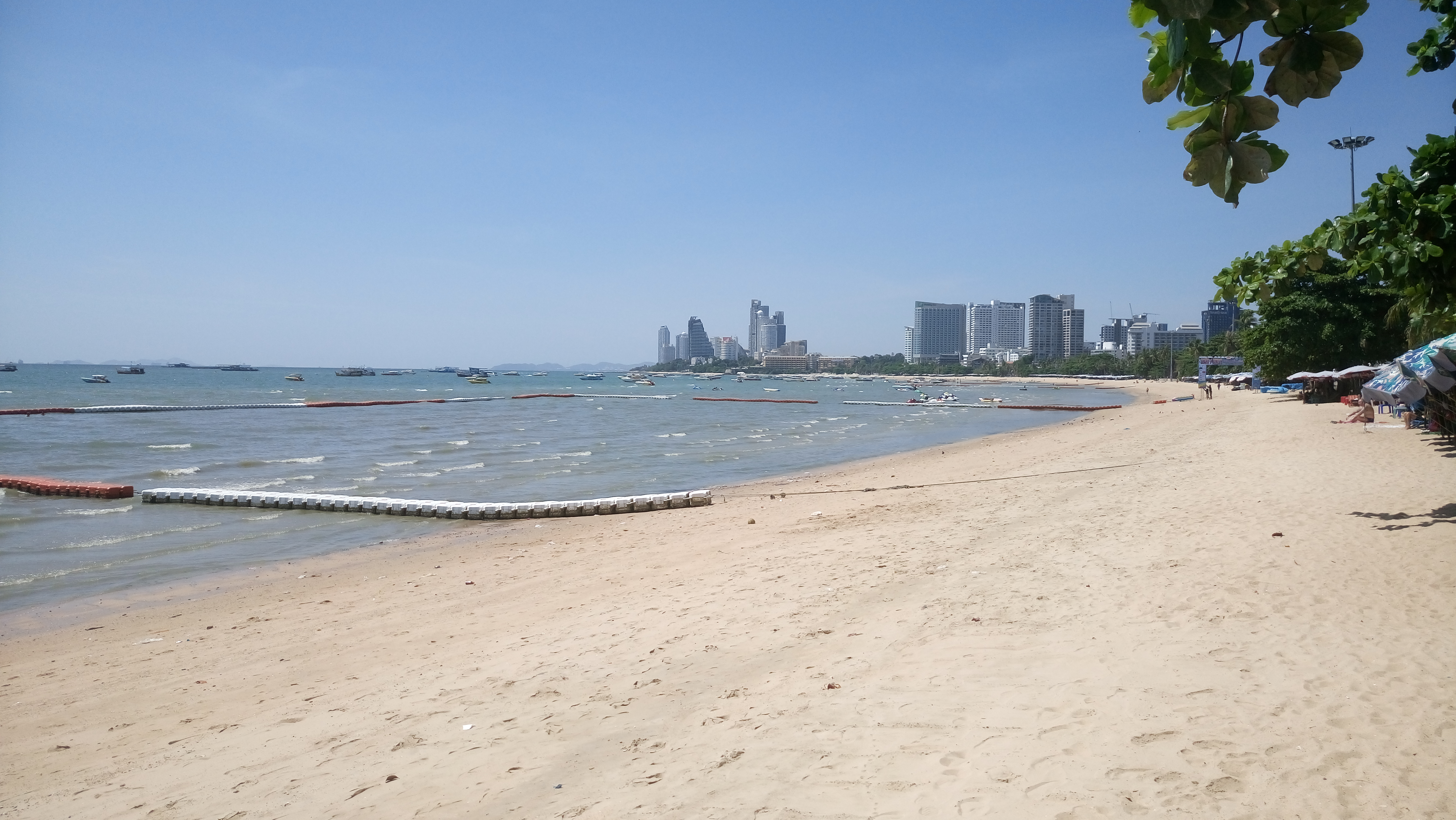
Pattaya Beach in June 2017

Beaches on the bay play an important role in the economy of the area and in Thailand's tourism sector. Pattaya, a major tourist city in Chonburi province, contains several beaches with the most popular being Pattaya Beach. Koh Lan is a popular island off Pattaya in the Bay of Bangkok, attracting around 2,500 visitors each day during Thailand's peak season before the COVID-19 pandemic.

=== Oil and chemical spills ===
In May 2019, a fire onboard a South Korean ship at Laem Chabang caused a large-scale chemical spill, causing more than ฿100 million of damages.

On 12 February 2023, an oil tanker docked at Laem Chabang began leaking around 2,000 litres of oil in the water.

On 3 September 2023, an oil pipeline at the Si Racha oil terminals ruptured, polluting the water with 50–70 m³ of oil and creating a 5 km slick.

== Proposed sea crossing ==
The 'Thai bridge' or 'Saphan Thai', is a proposed bridge-tunnel system that would span across the Bay of Bangkok from roughly Hua Hin in Phetchaburi province to Pattaya in Chonburi province. Its cost was estimated to be around ฿900 billion in 2020, while its length around 80 to 100 km, making it longer than the Hong Kong–Zhuhai–Macau Bridge, the current longest sea crossing. If constructed, it would save around 2–3 hours of travel time.

The idea of the connection was approved in 2020 by the Centre for Economic Situation Administration (CESA). The policy committee of the Eastern Economic Corridor approved studies on the feasibility of projects to connect the Laem Chabang port to ports in Chumphon and Ranong on 7 October 2020, including the Saphan Thai. Chaired by Prime Minister Prayut Chan-o-cha, it saw that the crossing could be completed by 2023.

The project has been proposed with a land bridge between Chumphon and Ranong across the Kra Isthmus, which was approved by the cabinet of Srettha Thavisin on 16 October 2023.
