= 2013 Regional League Division 2 Central & Eastern Region =

Regional League Central & Eastern Region
- Season: 2013

2013 Regional League Division 2 Central & Eastern Region is the 5th season of the League competition since its establishment in 2009. It is in the third tier of the Thai football league system.

== Changes from last season ==
=== Team changes ===
==== Promoted clubs ====
Ayutthaya, Rayong and Trat were promoted to the 2013 Thai Division 1 League.

==== Relegated clubs ====
Chanthaburi and JW Rangsit were relegated from the 2012 Thai Division 1 League

==== Relocated clubs ====
Thai Airways-Look Isan relocated to the Regional League Central-East Division from the Bangkok Area Division 2012.

Ang Thong, Muangkan, Phetchaburi, Prachuap Khiri Khan, Looktabfah F.C. have all been moved into the Central & Western Division 2013

==== Expansion clubs ====
Kabin United Pluak Daeng and Phan Thong joined the newly expanded league setup.

==== Withdrawn clubs ====
- Lopburi F.C. have withdrawn from the 2013 campaign.
- Kabin City have withdrawn from the 2013 campaign.

==== Renamed clubs ====
- J.W. Rangsit renamed Rangsit University.

== Stadium and locations ==
Locations of the Regional League Central & Eastern Region Teams
Football clubs in Bangkok Metropolitan Region

Team	Location	Stadium	Capacity	Ref.
Cha Choeng Sao	Chachoengsao	Chachoengsao Town municipality Stadium	?	
Chanthaburi	Chanthaburi	Chanthaburi Province Stadium	5,000	
Kabin United	Prachinburi	Nom Klao Maharaj Stadium	3,000	
Maptaphut Marines	Rayong	Maptaphut Stadium	?	
Nakhon Nayok	Nakhon Nayok	Nakhon Nayok Province Stadium	2,406	
Look Isan-Thai Airways	Pathum Thani	Thammasat Stadium	20,000	
Phan Thong	Chonburi	Institute of Physical Education Chonburi Campus Stadium	12,000	
Prachinburi United	Prachinburi	Prachinburi Province Stadium	3,000	
Pathum Thani United	Pathum Thani	IPE Bangkok Stadium	?	
Royal Thai Fleet	Rayong	Sattahip Navy Stadium	12,500	
Rangsit University	Pathum Thani	Rangsit University Stadium	2,684	
Sa Kaeo	Sa Kaeo	Sa Kaeo Provincial Administrative Organization Stadium	?	
Samut Prakan	Bang Phli, Samut Prakan Lam Fah Pha, Samut Prakan	Samut Prakarn Province Stadium (Bang Pla) Lam Fah Pha Subdistrict municipality Stadium	? ?	
Pluak Daeng	Chonburi Rayong	Pattana Sport Club Stadium Rayong Province Stadium	? 7,500	

== League table ==
Pos	Team	Pld	W	D	L	GF	GA	GD	Pts	Qualification
1	Look Isan-Thai Airways (C, Q)	26	17	6	3	51	18	+33	57	Champions League Round
2	Nakhon Nayok (Q)	26	17	5	4	50	26	+24	56	Champions League Round
3	Sa Kaeo	26	15	5	6	46	24	+22	50	
4	Chanthaburi	26	14	4	8	35	24	+11	46	
5	Prachinburi United	26	12	7	7	39	27	+12	43	
6	Pathum Thani United	26	10	9	7	27	22	+5	39	
7	Cha Choeng Sao	26	10	7	9	43	31	+12	37	
8	Maptaphut Marines	26	9	10	7	32	26	+6	37	
9	Royal Thai Fleet	26	9	9	8	32	31	+1	36	
10	Rangsit University	26	9	5	12	39	38	+1	32	
11	Samut Prakan	26	9	5	12	20	23	−3	32	
12	Phan Thong	26	7	2	17	41	58	−17	23	
13	Kabin United	26	4	2	20	22	51	−29	14	
14	Pluak Daeng	26	1	2	23	16	94	−78	5	

Updated to match(es) played on 15 September 2013. Source:
Rules for classification: 1) points; 2) head-to-head points; 3) head-to-head goal difference; 4) head-to-head goals scored; 5) goal difference; 6) number of goals scored.
(C) Champions; (Q) Qualified for the phase indicated
