= 2017 Thai League 4 =

2017 Thai League T4
- Season: 2017
- Champions: Regional stage JL Chiangmai United (Northern); Sisaket United (Northeastern); Chanthaburi (Eastern); Suphanburi B (Western); Satun United (Southern); North Bangkok University (Bangkok Metro)
- Promoted: Champions league round BTU United (Group A winners); JL Chiangmai United (Group B winners); Chiangrai City (Group A runners-up); Muangkan United (Group B runners-up); Marines Eureka (Best third-placed)
- Relegated: Regional stage Paknampho NSRU(Northern); Mukdahan Chaiyuenyong(Northeastern); Prachinburi United (Eastern); Pathum Thani United(Western); Sungaipadee (Southern); Samut Prakan United(Bangkok Metro)

The 2017 Thai League T4 (also known as the Euro Cake League for sponsorship reasons) was the 12th season of the Thai League 4, it had redirected from the regional league division 2, since its establishment in 2006. The 61 clubs will be divided into 6 groups (regions).

== Regional League stage All locations ==
Locations of the 2017 Thai League 4 All Teams
2017 Thai League 4 Bangkok & field Region
2017 Thai League 4 Eastern Region
2017 Thai League 4 Western Region
2017 Thai League 4 Northern Region
2017 Thai League 4 North Eastern Region
2017 Thai League 4 Southern Region

=== 2017 ===
Red Zone : 2017 Thai League 4 Bangkok Metropolitan Region
Yellow Zone : 2017 Thai League 4 Eastern Region
Pink Zone: 2017 Thai League 4 Western Region
Green Zone: 2017 Thai League 4 Northern Region
Orange Zone: 2017 Thai League 4 North Eastern Region
Blue Zone: 2017 Thai League 4 Southern Region

=== List of Qualified Teams ===
T4 North (1)

- JL Chiangmai United

T4 Northeast (3)

- Sisaket United
- Mashare Chaiyaphum
- Muang Loei United

T4 East (2)

- Chanthaburi
- Marines Eureka

T4 West (2)

- Muangkan United
- BTU United

T4 Bangkok (2)

- North Bangkok University
- Samut Prakan

T4 South (1)

- Satun United

2017 Thai League 4 Champions League Play-off Round (1)

- Chiangrai City
Football clubs in Bangkok Metropolitan Region

== Champions League Knockout stage ==
=== Stadium and locations ===
Locations of the Champions League Knockout stage teams

Team	Location	Stadium	Capacity
BTU United	Bangkok	Bangkok-Thonburi University Stadium	1,500
Chanthaburi	Chanthaburi	Chanthaburi PAO. Stadium	4,800
Chiangrai City	Chiang Rai	Chiangrai Province Stadium	5,000
JL Chiangmai United	Chiang Mai	Chiangmai Municipality Stadium	2,500
Marines Eureka	Rayong	Klaeng Municipality Stadium	1,661
Mashare Chaiyaphum	Chaiyaphum	Chaiyaphum Province Stadium	2,564
Muangkan United	Kanchanaburi	Kleebbua Stadium	5,403
Muang Loei United	Loei	Wang Saphung District Stadium	1,000
North Bangkok University	Pathum Thani	North Bangkok University Stadium (Rangsit)	4,700
Samut Prakan	Samut Prakan	Samut Prakarn SAT Stadium (Keha Bang Phli)	3,500
Satun United	Satun	Satun PAO. Stadium	4,671
Sisaket United	Sisaket	Sri Nakhon Lamduan Stadium	9,000

Football clubs in Bangkok Metropolitan Region

== Play-off round ==
Runner-up of 2017 Thai League 4 Northern Region and Runner-up of 2017 Thai League 4 Southern Region football teams pass to this round. this round plays sudden death matches. The winner will entered to the First round.

16 September 2017	Chiangrai City	2 – 2 (3 – 0 p)	Phuket	Nonthaburi
18:00 (UTC+7)	Nantawat Tansopa 102' (pen.); Maryson Jone dos Santos 105'	report	Tevarit Junsom 92'; Nattapoom Maya 93'	Stadium: Nonthaburi Province Stadium

== First round ==
Winner of Play-off round and 11 Thai football teams pass to this round. this round provide 2 part to Group A and Group B. Each group has 6 Thai football teams. It is paired to 3 couples and plays Home-Away matches. Thai football teams which take total score over opportunity for win this round and pass to Final round. Away goals rule is used to this tournament.

=== Group A ===
23 September 2017
18:00 UTC+7

Sisaket United	4 – 0	Chiangrai City
Phanupong Intachomphu 51'; Chatri Rattanawong 61', 68'; Rattasak Weing-in 77'	report

Sri Nakhon Lamduan Stadium, Sisaket
Attendance: 332
Referee: Rattapol Kongboonwas
1 October 2017
18:00 UTC+7

Chiangrai City	6 – 1	Sisaket United
Nantawat Tansopa 25'; Maryson Jone dos Santos 32', 49'; Eakkanit Punya 34'; Chayanon Khamkan 46'; Luis Fernando Cardozo 53'	report	Chatri Rattanawong 48'

Chiangrai Province Stadium, Chiang Rai
Attendance: 63
Referee: Pathompong Eawjaroen

Chiangrai City won 6–5 on aggregate.

23 September 2017
16:00 UTC+7

Mashare Chaiyaphum	3 – 2	Chanthaburi
Watchara Ritkumrang 53'; Ittipol Pol-ard 61'; Kelvin Amdonsah 90+4'	report	Thirawut Thiwato 6'; Saknarin Pinjaikul 41'

Chaiyaphum Province Stadium, Chaiyaphum
Attendance: 780
Referee: Pisit Boonthongpaeng
1 October 2017
18:00 UTC+7

Chanthaburi	2 – 0	Mashare Chaiyaphum
Nattawut Ngamthuan 26'; Nattapon Saiyasat 90'	report

Chanthaburi PAO. Stadium, Chanthaburi
Attendance: 892
Referee: Jirawit Pornkaew

Chanthaburi won 4–3 on aggregate.

23 September 2017
16:00 UTC+7

Satun United	0 – 1	BTU United
	report	Theerapat Laksameearunothai 69'

Satun PAO. Stadium, Satun
Attendance: 1,050
Referee: Manop Lempan
1 October 2017
18:00 UTC+7

BTU United	0 – 1 (a.e.t.)	Satun United
Nattawat Wongsri 28' (o.g.)	report
Penalties
Sitthinon Ketkaeo (penalty scored); Natthawut Namthip (penalty scored); Sarawut Natasat (penalty scored); Wacharapoom Boonyaem (penalty scored); Phuvasit Khamkien (penalty scored); Kouassi Bernard (penalty scored); Heritiana Thierry Ratsimbazafy (penalty scored)	7–6	Sirawit Phutaworn (penalty scored); Chamsuddeen Sohteng (penalty scored); Abdulrosee Puhad (penalty scored); Daiki Konomura (penalty scored); Apichai Matwang (penalty scored); Thirawat Lertpitchapath (penalty scored); Somnuek Kaew-arporn (penalty missed)

Bangkok-Thonburi University Stadium, Bangkok
Attendance: 872
Referee: Apichet Kaewmaneechot

1–1 on aggregate. BTU United won 7–6 on penalties.

=== Group B ===
24 September 2017
16:00 UTC+7

Samut Prakan	0 – 1	JL Chiangmai United
	report	Taku Ito 52'

Samut Prakarn SAT Stadium (Keha Bang Phli), Samut Prakan
Attendance: 653
Referee: Surapon Sawangjit
30 September 2017
18:00 UTC+7

JL Chiangmai United	4 – 1	Samut Prakan
Chatchai Nakvijit 13' (pen.); Phichet Hawkongkaew 45+3'; Taku Ito 55'; Kittipong Namsang 90+2' (pen.)	report	Gabriel Mintah 11'

Chiangmai Municipality Stadium, Chiang Mai
Attendance: 583
Referee: Peerasan Krataithong

JL Chiangmai United won 5–1 on aggregate.

24 September 2017
16:00 UTC+7

Muangkan United	2 – 0	Muang Loei United
Pornthep Klakwongpung 52'; Anusorn Promprasit 80'	report

Kleeb Bua Stadium, Kanchanaburi
Attendance: 531
Referee: Chayanan Thuto
30 September 2017
16:00 UTC+7

Muang Loei United	1 – 0	Muangkan United
Chutchawal Nanteenpa 11'	report

Wang Saphung District Stadium, Loei
Attendance: 667
Referee: Somkid Sarapim

Muangkan United won 2–1 on aggregate.

24 September 2017
16:00 UTC+7

Marines Eureka	1 – 0	North Bangkok University
Noppadon Tornchuay 84'	report

Klaeng Municipality Stadium, Rayong
Attendance: 200
Referee: Worakrit Panyu
30 September 2017
15:30 UTC+7

North Bangkok University	2 – 1	Marines Eureka
Poomipat Kantanet 4'; Weerayut Jitkuntod 99'	report	Nattakan Kaewkong 119'

North Bangkok University Stadium (Rangsit), Pathum Thani
Attendance: 300
Referee: Jirayut Kasipol

2–2 on aggregate. Marines Eureka won on away goals.

== Final round ==
6 Thai football teams, Which win opportunity, pass to this round. this round provide 2 part to 2017 Thai League 4 champions league round Group A and 2017 Thai League 4 champions league round Group B. Each region has 3 Thai football teams. It plays Round-robin matches. Thai football teams which get champion, runner-up and 3rd position which has the best scores of each region to were promoted to 2018 Thai League 3. Mini-league rule is used to this tournament.

=== Group A ===
Pos	Team	Pld	W	D	L	GF	GA	GD	Pts	Qualification or relegation
1	BTU United (P)	2	2	0	0	8	3	+5	6	promoted to 2018 Thai League 3
2	Chiangrai City (P)	2	1	0	1	4	4	0	3	promoted to 2018 Thai League 3
3	Chanthaburi	2	0	0	2	1	6	−5	0	

Updated to match(es) played on unknown. Source: Thai League 4
Rules for classification: 1) points; 2) goal difference; 3) number of goals scored.
(P) Promoted

7 October 2017	Chiangrai City	2 – 0	Chanthaburi	Chiang Rai
18:00 (UTC+7)	Nantawat Tansopa 57'; Maryson Jone dos Santos 90+2'	report		Stadium: Chiangrai Province Stadium; Attendance: 194; Referee: Thanawit Prompetch

15 October 2017	Chanthaburi	1 – 4	BTU United	Chanthaburi
18:00 (UTC+7)	Thirawut Thiwato 63' (pen.)	report	Olveira Silva Diego 39'; Sitthinon Ketkaeo 67'; Heritiana Thierry Ratsimbazafy 76'; Natthawut Namthip 81'	Stadium: Chanthaburi PAO. Stadium; Attendance: 913; Referee: Jirayut Kasiphol

22 October 2017	BTU United	4 – 2	Chiangrai City	Bangkok
18:00 (UTC+7)	Olveira Silva Diego 30', 73', 79'; Sitthinon Ketkaeo 65'	report	Jetsada Supharit 82'; Maryson Jone dos Santos 90'	Stadium: Bangkok-Thonburi University Stadium; Attendance: 385; Referee: Surapon Sawangjit

=== Group B ===
Pos	Team	Pld	W	D	L	GF	GA	GD	Pts	Qualification or relegation
1	JL Chiangmai United (P)	2	1	1	0	2	0	+2	4	promoted to 2018 Thai League 3
2	Muangkan United (P)	2	1	0	1	1	2	−1	3	promoted to 2018 Thai League 3
3	Marines Eureka (P)	2	0	1	1	0	1	−1	1	promoted to 2018 Thai League 3

Updated to match(es) played on unknown. Source: Thai League 4
Rules for classification: 1) points; 2) goal difference; 3) number of goals scored.
(P) Promoted

8 October 2017	JL Chiangmai United	2 – 0	Muangkan United	Chiang Mai
18:00 (UTC+7)	Chatchai Nakvijit 8'; Phichet Hawkongkaew 56'; Tangeni Shipahu 68'	report		Stadium: Chiangmai Municipality Stadium; Attendance: 623; Referee: Supat Chaingam

14 October 2017	Muangkan United	1 – 0	Marines Eureka	Kanchanaburi
16:00 (UTC+7)	Kedi Amang Ghislain Roger 26'	report		Stadium: Kleebbua Stadium; Attendance: 542; Referee: Jirawit Pornkaew

22 October 2017	Marines Eureka	0 – 0	JL Chiangmai United	Rayong
16:00 (UTC+7)		report		Stadium: Klaeng Municipality Stadium; Attendance: 205; Referee: Thapakorn Thongkorn

=== Ranking of third-placed teams ===
The best third-placed team would promoted to 2018 Thai League 3.

Pos	Grp	Team	Pld	W	D	L	GF	GA	GD	Pts	Qualification or relegation
1	B	Marines Eureka	2	0	1	1	0	1	−1	1	Promotion to the 2018 Thai League 3
2	A	Chanthaburi	2	0	0	2	1	6	−5	0	

Updated to match(es) played on 22 October 2017. Source: Thai League 4
Rules for classification: 1) Points; 2) Overall goals difference; 3) Overall goals scored; 4) Fair play points; 5) Play-off without extra time;).

== Teams promoted to 2018 Thai League 3 ==
- BTU United (Group A winners)
- JL Chiangmai United (Group B winners)
- Chiangrai City (Group A runners-up)
- Muangkan United (Group B runners-up)
- Marines Eureka (Best third-placed)

== See also ==
- 2017 Thai League
- 2017 Thai League 2
- 2017 Thai League 3
- 2017 Thailand Amateur League
- 2017 Thai FA Cup
- 2017 Thai League Cup
- 2017 Thailand Champions Cup
