= 2015 Regional League Division 2 Central & Eastern Region =

Regional League Central & Eastern Region
- Season: 2015
- Champions: Rayong
- Matches: 181
- Goals: 515 (2.85 per match)
- Biggest home win: Cha Choeng Sao 6–0 Chanthaburi (15 February 2015)
- Biggest away win: Kabin United 1–5 Cha Choeng Sao (6 September 2015)
- Highest scoring: Kabin United 5–4 Maptaphut (19 July 2015); Royal Thai Fleet 4–5 Cha Choeng Sao (20 September 2015)

2015 Regional League Division 2 Central & Eastern Region is the 7th season of the League competition since its establishment in 2009. It is in the third tier of the Thai football league system.

== Changes from last season ==
=== Team changes ===
==== Promoted clubs ====
No club was promoted to the Thai Division 1 League. Last years league champions Prachinburi United and runners up Maptaphut Rayong failed to qualify from the 2014 Regional League Division 2 championsleague round.

==== Relegated clubs ====
Sriracha Ban Bueng were relegated from the 2014 Thai Division 1 League.

==== Renamed clubs ====
- Maptaphut Rayong renamed Marines Maptaphut.
- Sriracha Ban Bueng renamed Tawee Wattana.

==== Withdrawn clubs ====
Pakchong United and TG Rayong have withdrawn from the 2015 campaign.

=== Expansion clubs ===
Kaeng Khoi TRU joined the newly expanded league setup.

== Stadium and locations ==
Locations of the 2015 Regional League Division 2 League Central & Eastern Region Teams

Team	Location	Stadium	Capacity	Ref.
Cha Choeng Sao	Chachoengsao	Chachoengsao Town municipality Stadium	?	
Chanthaburi	Chanthaburi	Chanthaburi Province Stadium	?	
Kabin United	Prachinburi	Nom Klao Maharaj Stadium	3,000	
Kaeng Khoi TRU	Saraburi	Tab Kwang Town municipality Stadium	1,000	
Maptaphut Marines	Rayong	Maptaphut Municipality Stadium (Neonphayom Stadium)	?	
Nakhon Nayok	Nakhon Nayok	Nakhon Nayok PAO. Stadium	2,406	
Phan Thong	Chonburi	IPE Chonburi Stadium	12,000	
Prachinburi United	Prachinburi Prachantakham	Prachinburi Province Stadium Ko Loi Stadium (2 match)	3,000 ?	
Pathum Thani United	Pathum Thani	IPE Bangkok Stadium	20,000	
Royal Thai Fleet	Chonburi	Sattahip Navy Stadium	12,500	
Rayong	Rayong	Rayong Province Central Stadium	4,512	
Sa Kaeo	Sa Kaeo	Sa Kaeo PAO. Stadium	?	
Samut Prakan	Samut Prakan	Lam Fah Pha Subdistrict municipality Stadium	?	
Tawee Wattana	Nakhon Pathom Thawi Watthana, Bangkok	Suan Sunandha Rajabhat University Stadium (Salaya) (Klongyong) Bangkok-Thonburi University Stadium	? ?	

Football clubs in Bangkok Metropolitan Region

== League table ==
Pos	Team	Pld	W	D	L	GF	GA	GD	Pts	Qualification
1	Rayong (C, Q)	26	19	5	2	50	17	+33	62	Champions League Round
2	Cha Choeng Sao (Q)	26	15	6	5	54	31	+23	51	Champions League Round
3	Samut Prakan	26	15	5	6	36	22	+14	50	
4	Prachinburi United	26	14	4	8	38	27	+11	46	
5	Chanthaburi	26	13	4	9	37	33	+4	43	
6	Kaeng Khoi TRU	26	11	9	6	46	36	+10	42	
7	Sa Kaeo	26	8	9	9	33	36	−3	33	
8	Kabin United	26	8	7	11	39	46	−7	31	
9	Marines Maptaphut	26	7	9	10	28	34	−6	30	
10	Pathum Thani United	26	7	8	11	33	38	−5	29	
11	Phan Thong	26	7	4	15	47	59	−12	25	
12	Tawee Wattana	26	4	8	14	28	44	−16	20 (Note: TAW 4–3 NAY; NAY 2–2 TAW)	
13	Nakhon Nayok	26	6	2	18	29	58	−29	20	
14	Royal Thai Fleet	26	2	12	12	33	50	−17	18	

Rules for classification: 1) points; 2) head-to-head points; 3) head-to-head goal difference; 4) head-to-head goals scored; 5) goal difference; 6) number of goals scored.
(C) Champions; (Q) Qualified for the phase indicated

== See also ==
- 2015 Thai Premier League
- 2015 Thai Division 1 League
- 2015 Regional League Division 2
- 2015 Thai FA Cup
- 2015 Thai League Cup
- 2015 Kor Royal Cup
