= 2011 Regional League Division 2 Central & Eastern Region =

Regional League Central-East Division
- Season: 2011
- Matches: 160
- Goals: 421 (2.63 per match)
- Biggest home win: Ratchaburi 6-0 Prachuap Khiri Khan (7 May 2011); Rayong 6-0 Prachinburi United (24 July 2011)
- Biggest away win: Kabinburi 0-6 Ang Thong (9 July 2011)
- Highest scoring: Phetchaburi 6-2 Prachinburi United (21 May 2011) (8 goals)

2011 Regional League Division 2 Central-East Region is the 3rd season of the League competition since its establishment in 2009. It is in the third tier of the Thai football league system.

== Changes from last season ==
=== Team changes ===
==== Promoted clubs ====
Saraburi were promoted to the 2011 Thai Division 1 League.

==== Renamed clubs ====
- Sa Kaeo United renamed Sa Kaeo City.
- Prachuap Khiri Khan renamed Prachuap.
- Kabinburi renamed Kabin City.

==== Relocated clubs ====
Prachuap Khiri Khan re-located from the 2010 Thai Division 2 League Southern Region into the Central & Eastern Region.

== Stadium and locations ==
Locations of the Regional League Central & Eastern Region Teams
Football clubs in Bangkok Metropolitan Region

Team	Location	Stadium	Capacity	Ref.
Ang Thong	Ang Thong	Ang Thong Provincial Administrative Organization Stadium	5,500	
Ayutthaya	Ayutthaya	Ayutthaya Province Stadium	6,000	
Cha Choeng Sao	Chachoengsao	Chachoengsao Province Stadium	?	
Lopburi	Lopburi	Phra Ramesuan Stadium	5,334	
Kabin City	Prachinburi	Nom Klao Maharaj Stadium	3,000	
Muangkan	Kanchanaburi	Kanchanaburi Stadium	13,000	
Nakhon Nayok	Nakhon Nayok	Nakhon Nayok Province Stadium	2,406	
Phetchaburi	Phetchaburi	Donkhan Stadium	6,575	
Prachuap	Prachuap Khiri Khan	Prachuap Khiri Khan Province Stadium	7,000	
Prachinburi United	Prachinburi	Prachinburi Province Stadium	3,000	
Pathum Thani	Pathum Thani	Chaloem Phra Kiat Stadium2 (Khlong 6)	?	
Ratchaburi	Ratchaburi	Ratchaburi Province Stadium	10,373	
Rayong	Rayong	Rayong Province Stadium	7,000	
Sa Kaeo City	Sa Kaeo	Wangnamyen municipality Stadium	?	
Samut Prakan	Samut Prakan	Forza Stadium	?	
Samut Sakhon	Samut Sakhon	Samut Sakhon Province Stadium	3,000	

== League table ==
Pos	Team	Pld	W	D	L	GF	GA	GD	Pts	Qualification
1	Ratchaburi (C, Q)	30	20	8	2	67	19	+48	68	Champions League Round
2	Rayong (Q)	30	20	6	4	68	22	+46	66	Champions League Round
3	Samut Sakhon	30	17	9	4	43	27	+16	60	
4	Ayutthaya	30	14	10	6	60	34	+26	52	
5	Ang Thong	30	13	12	5	52	31	+21	51	
6	Lopburi	30	13	12	5	47	31	+16	51	
7	Cha Choeng Sao	30	14	9	7	54	45	+9	51	
8	Phetchaburi	30	11	9	10	35	34	+1	42	
9	Samut Prakan	30	10	11	9	41	33	+8	41	
10	Muangkan	30	9	7	14	30	40	−10	34	
11	Prachinburi United	30	8	5	17	30	58	−28	29	
12	Sa Kaeo City	30	6	7	17	25	45	−20	25	
13	Prachuap Khiri Khan	30	7	3	20	25	48	−23	24	
14	Pathum Thani	30	5	8	17	34	59	−25	23	
15	Kabin City	30	5	6	19	26	76	−50	21	
16	Nakhon Nayok	30	5	4	21	22	57	−35	19	

Updated to match(es) played on 12 September 2011. Source:
Rules for classification: 1) points; 2) head-to-head points; 3) head-to-head goal difference; 4) head-to-head goals scored; 5) goal difference; 6) number of goals scored.
(C) Champions; (Q) Qualified for the phase indicated

== Results ==
Home \ Away	ANT	ATY	CCS	KBB	LPB	MUK	NAY	PTN	PHB	PRA	PRC	RTB	RYN	KAE	SPR	SSK
Ang Thong			1–3	4–1	3–1	2–0	3–1		1–1	1–1	0–0		1–2	1–1		
Ayutthaya	0–1			3–0			1–0	3–0	4–1		2–1	3–3	2–3		3–4	0–1
Cha Choeng Sao		1–1		1–1	2–1			1–0	1–0	1–0	4–2	2–2	2–3			0–1
Kabin City	0–6	0–0			2–3		1–0	1–1		2–4	3–2	1–2			2–3	3–0
Lopburi		1–3		0–0		4–0		2–2		3–0	1–0	1–2	2–1	1–1		0–0
Muangkan		2–4	0–0	0–0	1–1		2–1	3–0	0–1				0–1	3–1	1–1	
Nakhon Nayok	2–1	0–4	2–3	1–0	1–2	3–2			0–0				0–2	2–0	1–2	
Pathum Thani	3–3		1–4			0–4	3–1		3–2	3–1	1–3	1–1		1–0	1–2	
Phetchaburi		0–3	1–3	0–0	0–0			2–1		6–2		0–3	2–1	1–0	1–1	1–2
Prachinburi United	0–1	1–1	1–1	4–1		2–0	2–1	1–1					0–1		0–2	
Prachuap Khiri Khan	1–2		2–3			2–0	2–0		0–1	1–2		0–2		1–0	0–1	0–1
Ratchaburi	0–0				1–1	1–0	4–0	3–0	1–0	4–0	6–0			1–0	0–0	
Rayong	0–0	2–2		6–1		5–0		2–0		6–0	1–0	0–0			1–1	1–0
Sa Kaeo City		0–0	1–1	1–0	1–1				0–2	3–0	1–1	0–1	0–3		4–3	1–2
Samut Prakan	0–1	1–0	1–2		1–1	1–2	1–2							0–0		0–0
Samut Sakhon	1–1		2–2		0–0	2–1	3–1	0–1		2–0	3–1	0–2	1–0		1–0	

Updated to match(es) played on 24 July 2011. Source:
Legend: Blue = home team win; Yellow = draw; Red = away team win.
