= 2015 Thai League Cup =

Tournament details
- Country: Thailand
- Dates: 31 January 2015 – 21 November 2015

Final positions
- Champions: Buriram United (4th title)
- Runners-up: Sisaket

Awards
- Best player: Suchao Nutnum

The Thai League Cup is a knock-out football tournament played in Thai sport. Some games are played as a single match, others are played as two-legged contests. The 2015 Thai League Cup kicked off on 31 January 2015. The Thai League Cup has been readmitted back into Thai football after a 10-year absence. The Thai League Cup is sponsored by Toyota thus naming it Toyota League Cup. The prize money for this prestigious award is said to be around 5 million baht and the runners-up would net 1 million baht.

The prize money is not the only benefit of this cup, the team winning the fair play spot will get a Hilux Vigo. The MVP of the competition will get a Toyota Camry Hybrid Car. The winner of the cup will earn the right to participate on a cup competition in Japan.

This was the first edition of the competition and the qualifying round was played in regions featuring clubs from the Regional League Division 2.

== Calendar ==
| Round | Date | Matches | Clubs | New entries this round |
|---|---|---|---|---|
| 1st Qualification Round | 31 January 2015 and 1 February 2015 | 18 | 36 → 18 to Lastly Qualification Round | 36 Regional League Division 2 |
| Lastly, Qualification Round | 4, 7, 8, 9, 10, 14 and 15 February 2015 | 24 | 30 + 18 → 24 to First Round | 30 Regional League Division 2 |
| Qualification-Playoff Round | 7 February 2015 | 2 | 4 → 2 to First Round | 4 Regional League Division 2 |
| First Round | 17, 18 and 19 April 2015 | 32 | 24 + 2 + 20 + 18 → 32 | 20 2015 Thai Division 1 League and 18 2015 Thai Premier League |
| Second Round | 1 July 2015 | 16 | 32 → 16 | |
| Third Round | 22 July 2015 | 8 | 16 → 8 | |
| Quarter-finals | 5 August 2015 | 8 | 8 → 4 | |
| Quarter-finals | 16 September 2015 | 8 | 8 → 4 | |
| Semi-finals | 30 September 2015 | 4 | 4 → 2 | |
| Semi-finals | 21 October 2015 | 4 | 4 → 2 | |
| Final | 21 November 2015 | 1 | 2 → Champions | |
| Total | | | | 108 clubs |

== 1st Qualification Round ==
=== Northern Region ===
The qualifying round was played in regions featuring clubs from the 2015 Thai Division 2 League Northern Region

| 31 January 2015 | Phrae United | 0(5) – 0(4) | Phitsanulok TSY | Phrae |
| 18:00 (UTC+7) | | | | Stadium: Thunghong Stadium |

| 1 February 2015 | Singburi | 1 – 0 | Nan | Chainat |
| 16:00 (UTC+7) | | | | Stadium: Khao Plong Stadium |

| 1 February 2015 | Tak City | 2 – 1 | Nakhon Sawan | Tak |
| 17:00 (UTC+7) | | | | Stadium: Tak Stadium |

=== North Eastern Region ===
The qualifying round was played in regions featuring clubs from the 2015 Thai Division 2 League North Eastern Region

| 31 January 2015 | Nong Bua Pitchaya | 2 – 1 | Khonkaen | Nong Bua Lamphu |
| 16:00 (UTC+7) | | | | Stadium: Nong Bua Lamphu Stadium |

| 31 January 2015 | Nong Khai FT | 1 – 2 | Udon Thani | Nong Khai |
| 17:00 (UTC+7) | | | | Stadium: Nong Khai Stadium |

| 31 January 2015 | Roi Et United | 1 – 0 | Mahasarakham United | Roi Et |
| 18:00 (UTC+7) | | | | Stadium: Roi Et Stadium |

=== Central & Eastern Region ===
The qualifying round was played in regions featuring clubs from the 2015 Thai Division 2 League Central & Eastern Region

| 31 January 2015 | Nakhon Nayok | 1 – 0 | Royal Thai Fleet | Nakhon Nayok |
| 15:00 (UTC+7) | | | | Stadium: Nakhon Nayok Stadium |

| 31 January 2015 | Taweewattana Sriracha | 1 – 3 | Cha Choeng Sao | Bangkok |
| 15:30 (UTC+7) | | | | Stadium: Suan Sunandha Rajabhat University stadium |

| 1 February 2015 | Samut Prakan | 0 – 1 | Rayong | Samut Prakan |
| 15:30 (UTC+7) | | | | Stadium: Lamfhapa Stadium |

=== Central & Western Region ===
The qualifying round was played in regions featuring clubs from the 2015 Thai Division 2 League Central & Western Region

| 31 January 2015 | Hua Hin City | 1 – 0 | Nonthaburi | Prachuap Khiri Khan |
| 15:30 (UTC+7) | | | | Stadium: Thanaratchata Camp Football Field |

| 31 January 2015 | Simork | 1 – 2 | PTU Pathum Thani Seeker | Suphanburi |
| 15:30 (UTC+7) | | | | Stadium: Suphanburi school stadium |

| 1 February 2015 | Ratchaphruek Muengnon United | 3 – 2 | Thonburi City | Nakhon Pathom |
| 15:30 (UTC+7) | | | | Stadium: Rajamangala University of Technology Rattanakosin Stadium |

| 1 February 2015 | Looktabfah Pathumthani | 0(4) – 0(2) | Globlex TWD | Pathum Thani |
| 18:00 (UTC+7) | | | | Stadium: Thupathemi Stadium |

=== Bangkok & field Region ===
The qualifying round was played in regions featuring clubs from the 2015 Thai Division 2 League Bangkok & field Region

| 31 January 2015 | Kasetsart University | 1 – 2 | Dome | Bangkok |
| 15:30 (UTC+7) | | | | Stadium: Intree Chantarasatit Stadium |

| 31 January 2015 | Pluakdaeng Rayong United | 1(6) – 1(5) | Kasem Bundit University | Rayong |
| 15:30 (UTC+7) | | | | Stadium: Klaeng District Stadium |

| 1 February 2015 | Customs United | 2 – 1 | BCC-Tero | Bangkok |
| 18:00 (UTC+7) | | | | Stadium: Lad Krabang 54 Stadium |

=== Southern Region ===
The qualifying round was played in regions featuring clubs from the 2015 Thai Division 2 League Southern Region

| 31 January 2015 | Trang | 2 – 1 | Ranong United | Trang |
| 16:00 (UTC+7) | | | | Stadium: Trang Stadium |

| 31 January 2015 | Nakhon Si Heritage | 0 – 1 (a.e.t.) | Nara United | Nakhon Si Thammarat |
| 16:00 (UTC+7) | | | | Stadium: Ronpibul Stadium |

== 2nd Qualification Round ==
=== Northern Region ===
The qualifying round was played in regions featuring clubs from the 2015 Thai Division 2 League Northern Region

| 7 February 2015 | Tak City | 0(3) – 0(4) | Kamphaeng Phet | Tak |
| 17:00 (UTC+7) | | | | Stadium: Tak Stadium |

| 7 February 2015 | Chiang Rai City | 2 – 1 (a.e.t.) | Lopburi | Chiang Rai |
| 18:00 (UTC+7) | | | | Stadium: Chiangrai Stadium |

| 8 February 2015 | Singburi | 1 – 0 | Phetchabun | Chainat |
| 16:00 (UTC+7) | | | | Stadium: Khao Plong Stadium |

| 8 February 2015 | Phrae United | 1 – 0 | Uttaradit | Phrae |
| 18:00 (UTC+7) | | | | Stadium: Thunghong Stadium |

| 8 February 2015 | Lamphun Warrior | 2 – 1 (a.e.t.) | Phayao | Lamphun |
| 18:00 (UTC+7) | | | | Stadium: Mae Guang Stadium |

=== North Eastern Region ===
The qualifying round was played in regions featuring clubs from the 2015 Thai Division 2 League North Eastern Region

| 7 February 2015 | Udon Thani | 1 – 2 | Loei City | Udon Thani |
| 18:00 (UTC+7) | | | | Stadium: Institute of Physical Education Udon Thani Stadium |

| 7 February 2015 | Roi Et United | 0 – 3 | Khon Kaen United | Roi Et |
| 18:00 (UTC+7) | | | | Stadium: Roi Et Stadium |

| 8 February 2015 | Nong Bua Pitchaya | 0 – 1 (a.e.t.) | Ubon UMT United | Nong Bua Lamphu |
| 17:00 (UTC+7) | | | | Stadium: Nong Bua Lamphu Stadium |

| 10 February 2015 | Surin City | 2 – 0 | Sakon Nakhon | Surin |
| 18:00 (UTC+7) | | | | Stadium: Sri Narong Stadium |

=== Central & Eastern Region ===
The qualifying round was played in regions featuring clubs from the 2015 Thai Division 2 League Central & Eastern Region

| 4 February 2015 | Kaeng Khoi TRU | 3 – 5 | Phan Thong | Saraburi |
| 16:00 (UTC+7) | | | | Stadium: Tab Kwang Stadium |

| 7 February 2015 | Pathum Thani | 1 – 2 | Kabin United | Pathum Thani |
| 15:30 (UTC+7) | | | | Stadium: Institute of Physical Bangkok Stadium |

| 7 February 2015 | Cha Choeng Sao | 5 – 2 (a.e.t.) | Chanthaburi | Chachoengsao |
| 18:30 (UTC+7) | | | | Stadium: Pimpayachan Stadium |

| 8 February 2015 | Nakhon Nayok | 0 – 1 | Sa Kaeo | Nakhon Nayok |
| 15:30 (UTC+7) | | | | Stadium: Nakhon Nayok Stadium |

| 8 February 2015 | Rayong | 2 – 1 | Maptaphut Marine | Rayong |
| 18:00 (UTC+7) | | | | Stadium: Rayong Stadium |

=== Central & Western Region ===
The qualifying round was played in regions featuring clubs from the 2015 Thai Division 2 League Central & Western Region

| 7 February 2015 | Hua Hin City | 2 – 1 (a.e.t.) | Krung Thonburi | Prachuap Khiri Khan |
| 15:30 (UTC+7) | | | | Stadium: Thanaratchata Camp Football Field |

| 7 February 2015 | Ratchaphruek Muengnon United | 1 – 0 | Samut Sakhon | Nakhon Pathom |
| 15:30 (UTC+7) | | | | Stadium: Rajamangala University of Technology Rattanakosin Stadium |

| 7 February 2015 | Looktabfah Pathumthani | 1 – 0 (a.e.t.) | J.W. Police | Pathum Thani |
| 18:00 (UTC+7) | | | | Stadium: Thupathemi Stadium |

| 8 February 2015 | PTU Pathum Thani Seeker | 2 – 1 | Phetchaburi | Pathum Thani |
| 15:30 (UTC+7) | | | | Stadium: Valaya Alongkorn Rajabhat University Stadium |

=== Bangkok & field Region ===
The qualifying round was played in regions featuring clubs from the 2015 Thai Division 2 League Bangkok & field Region

| 7 February 2015 | Customs United | 1 – 0 | Rangsit | Bangkok |
| 18:00 (UTC+7) | | | | Stadium: Lad Krabang 54 Stadium |

| 8 February 2015 | Pluakdaeng Rayong United | 2 – 4 (a.e.t.) | Royal Thai Army | Rayong |
| 15:30 (UTC+7) | | | | Stadium: Klaeng District Stadium |

| 9 February 2015 | Dome | 1(5) – 1(3) | Ratchaburi Mitraphol RBAC | Pathum Thani |
| 18:00 (UTC+7) | | | | Stadium: Thammasat Stadium |

=== Southern Region ===
The qualifying round was played in regions featuring clubs from the 2015 Thai Division 2 League Southern Region

| 14 February 2015 | Trang | 2 – 1 | Yala United | Trang |
| 16:00 (UTC+7) | | | | Stadium: Trang Stadium |

| 15 February 2015 | Nara United | 0 – 1 | Phang Nga | Narathiwat |
| 16:30 (UTC+7) | | | | Stadium: Narathiwat Provincial Administrative Organization Stadium |

| 15 February 2015 | Surat | 0 – 2 | Pattani | Surat Thani |
| 16:30 (UTC+7) | | | | Stadium: Surat Thani Stadium |

== Qualification-Playoff Round ==
| 7 February 2015 | Kalasin | 3(5) – 3(7) | Rajpracha | Kalasin |
| 17:30 (UTC+7) | | | | Stadium: Kalasin Stadium |

| 7 February 2015 | Lampang | 2 – 0 | Prachinburi United | Lampang |
| 18:00 (UTC+7) | | | | Stadium: Lampang Stadium |

== First round ==
| 17 April 2015 | Royal Thai Army | 0 - 1 | Buriram United | Bangkok |
| 19:00 (UTC+7) | | report | Andrés Túñez 72' | Stadium: Thai Army Sports Stadium |

| 18 April 2015 | Raj Pracha | 0 - 2 | Bangkok United | Bangkok |
| 16:00 (UTC+7) | | report | Panupong Wongsa 20'; Ronnachai Rangsiyo 68' | Stadium: King Mongkut's Institute of Technology Ladkrabang Stadium |

| 18 April 2015 | Sa Kaeo | 1 - 2 | Bangkok Glass | Sa Kaeo |
| 17:00 (UTC+7) | Bangkali Coulibaly 17' | report | Goshi Okubo 5'; Lazarus Kaimbi 74' | Stadium: Sa Kaeo Stadium |

| 18 April 2015 | Phang Nga | 0 - 2 | Krabi | Phang Nga |
| 17:00 (UTC+7) | | report | Watcharapong Suwan 22'; Kraisorn Sriyan 64' | Stadium: Phang Nga Stadium |

| 18 April 2015 | Chiang Rai City | 1 - 3 (a.e.t.) | Osotspa | Chiang Rai |
| 18:00 (UTC+7) | Chayanon Khumkaen 46' | report | Boonmee Boonrod 90'; Chainarong Tathong 100'; Apipoo Suntornpanavech 120' | Stadium: Chiangrai Stadium |

| 18 April 2015 | Phichit | 0 - 3 | BEC Tero Sasana | Phichit |
| 18:00 (UTC+7) | | report | Ivan Bošković 45'; Fodé Diakité 55'; Adisak Kraisorn 77' | Stadium: Phichit Stadium |

| 18 April 2015 | Rayong | 2 - 3 | Ratchaburi | Rayong |
| 18:00 (UTC+7) | Chawin Srijan 36'; Carlos Rejinaldo 69' | report | Apiwat Ngaolamhin 13'; Heberty 17'; Assadin Mungkud 47' | Stadium: Rayong Stadium |

| 18 April 2015 | Air Force Central | 1 - 2 | Royal Thai Navy | Pathum Thani |
| 18:00 (UTC+7) | Peerawis Ritsriboon 71' | report | Anggello Machuca 90+1'; Jun M. Davidson 90+4' | Stadium: Thupatemee Stadium |

| 18 April 2015 | Khon Kaen United | 3 - 1 | Chainat | Khon Kaen |
| 18:00 (UTC+7) | Nelisson Teles 25'; Issarapong Lilakorn 29' (pen.); Teerayut Ngamlamai 77' | report | Adisak Klinkosoom 12' | Stadium: Khonkaen Sport School Stadium |

| 18 April 2015 | Pattaya United | 3 - 2 | Chiangrai United | Chonburi |
| 18:00 (UTC+7) | Milan Bubalo 6'; Roberto Merino 16' | report | Renan Marques 29', 90+3'; Keita Sugimoto 53' (o.g.) | Stadium: Dolphins Stadium |

| 18 April 2015 | Lamphun Warrior | 1 - 0 | PTT Rayong | Lamphun |
| 18:00 (UTC+7) | Surasak kumphan 35' | report | | Stadium: Mae Guang Stadium |

| 18 April 2015 | Songkhla United | 1 - 4 | SCG Muangthong United | Songkhla |
| 18:00 (UTC+7) | Rufo Sánchez 87' (pen.) | report | Teerasil Dangda 36', 59'; Cleiton Silva 45+2'; Thitipan Puangchan 58' | Stadium: Tinsulanon Stadium |

| 18 April 2015 | Lampang | 2 - 0 | Phuket | Lampang |
| 18:00 (UTC+7) | Jennarong Wongnoi 7'; Surapong Thongbua 88' | report | | Stadium: Lampang Stadium |

| 18 April 2015 | Trang | 0 - 2 | Prachuap | Trang |
| 18:00 (UTC+7) | | report | Apirak himkhaw 84'; Ekkaluck Lungnarm 89' | Stadium: Trang Stadium |

| 18 April 2015 | Cha Choeng Sao | 1 - 4 (a.e.t.) | Nakhon Ratchasima | Chachoengsao |
| 18:00 (UTC+7) | Jirachai Ladalok 21' | report | Dominic Adiyiah 19'; Björn Lindemann 96'; Yuttana Ruangsuksut 114'; Lee Tuck 115' | Stadium: Pimpayachan Stadium |

| 18 April 2015 | Chonburi | 2 - 0 | Ratchaphruek Muengnon United | Chonburi |
| 18:30 (UTC+7) | Pipob On-Mo 69'; Nurul Sriyankem 78' | report | | Stadium: Chonburi Stadium |

| 19 April 2015 | Hua Hin City | 0 - 1 | Ayutthaya | Prachuap Khiri Khan |
| 15:30 (UTC+7) | | report | Jaruwat Narnmool 47' | Stadium: Thanaratchata Camp Football Field |

| 19 April 2015 | Loei City | 1 - 0 (a.e.t.) | Bangkok | Loei |
| 15:30 (UTC+7) | Bunluesak Yodyingyong 116' | report | | Stadium: River Side Stadium |

| 19 April 2015 | PTU Pathum Thani Seeker | 3 - 2 (a.e.t.) | Chiangmai | Pathum Thani |
| 16:00 (UTC+7) | Tanaworakrit Kanya-ngeon 15'; Noppharat Uraikhae 57'; Sanong Chaiprakhom 116' | report | Kansit Premthanakul 30'; Ronnachai Pongputtha 38' | Stadium: Valaya Alongkorn Rajabhat University Stadium |

| 19 April 2015 | Looktabfah Pathumthani | 1(5) - 1(6) | BBCU | Pathum Thani |
| 16:00 (UTC+7) | Somsak Muksikaphan 77'; Jaksawatch Masaeng 78' (o.g.) | report | | Stadium: Thupatemee Stadium |

| 19 April 2015 | Dome | 2 - 1 | Samut Songkhram BTU | Pathum Thani |
| 16:00 (UTC+7) | Kwanthanong Phanyok 55'; Chanothad Phiphadmongkolchai 81' | report | Chana Sonwiset 90+5' | Stadium: Thammasat Stadium |

| 19 April 2015 | Pattani | 1 - 2 (a.e.t.) | Suphanburi | Pattani |
| 16:30 (UTC+7) | Teerawat Durnee 90' | report | Napat Thamrongsupakorn 90+2'; Jetsada Boonruangrod 102' | Stadium: Rainbow Stadium |

| 19 April 2015 | Phan Thong | 2 - 3 (a.e.t.) | Ang Thong | Chonburi |
| 17:00 (UTC+7) | Prince Amponsah 51'; Boonkerd Chaiyasin 73' | report | Santitorn Lattirom 11'; Kritsana Taiwan 37'; Sumet Jitklang 106' | Stadium: Institute of Physical Education Chonburi Campus Stadium |

| 19 April 2015 | Singburi | 2 - 1 (a.e.t.) | TOT S.C. | Chainat |
| 17:15 (UTC+7) | Souleymane Ture 56'; Anuruth Jaemjaeng 114' | report | Kanokpol Rungrueangrotchana 63' | Stadium: Khao Plong Stadium |

| 19 April 2015 | Thai Port | 6 - 0 | Kabin United | Prachinburi |
| 18:00 (UTC+7) | Lee Ho 27'; Brent McGrath 39'; Hironori Saruta 61'; Adisorn Daeng-rueng 67'; Ekkapoom Potharungroj 77'; Suchon Sa-nguandee 86' | report | | Stadium: Nom Klao Maharaj Stadium |

| 19 April 2015 | Kamphaeng Phet | 0 - 1 (a.e.t.) | Thai Honda | Kamphaeng Phet |
| 18:00 (UTC+7) | | report | Pornchai Ardjinda 98' | Stadium: Cha Kung Rao Stadium |

| 19 April 2015 | TTM | 1 - 2 | Police United | Bangkok |
| 18:00 (UTC+7) | Eakarthit Somjit 21' | report | Tana Chanabut 55'; Teeratep Winothai 73' | Stadium: Lad Krabang 54 Stadium |

| 19 April 2015 | Surin City | 1 - 3 (a.e.t.) | Gulf Saraburi | Surin |
| 18:00 (UTC+7) | Suriya Domtaisong 16' | report | Tanongsak Promdard 35'; Suriyakarn Chimjeen 91'; Bireme Diouf 109' | Stadium: Sri Narong Stadium |

| 19 April 2015 | Sukhothai | 1 - 5 | Army United | Sukhothai |
| 18:00 (UTC+7) | Jitthep Hemsanit 69' | report | Ernesto Amantegui 37'; Kai Hirano 50'; Melvin de Leeuw 77', 80'; Raphael Botti 90+2' | Stadium: Thung Talay Luang Stadium |

| 19 April 2015 | Ubon UMT United | 1 - 2 | Sisaket | Ubon Ratchathani |
| 18:00 (UTC+7) | Darryl Roberts 21' | report | Khaffa Boonmatoon 3'; Adefolarin Durosinmi 43' | Stadium: Tung Burapha Stadium |

| 19 April 2015 | Phrae United | 2 - 1 (a.e.t.) | Nakhonpathom United | Phrae |
| 18:00 (UTC+7) | kamara Souleymane 58'; Tetsuro Ionue 106' | report | Kone Mohamed 90' | Stadium: Thunghong Stadium |

| 19 April 2015 | Customs United | w/o | Trat | - |
| - | | | | Stadium: - |

== Second round ==
| 1 July 2015 | Loei City | w/o | Gulf Saraburi | - |
| - | | report | | Stadium: - |

| 1 July 2015 | PTU Pathum Thani Seeker | 0 – 4 | Chonburi | Pathum Thani |
| 16:00 (UTC+7) | | report | Kirati Keawsombat 23'; Juliano Mineiro 45+2', 49'; Wanit Chaisan 88' | Stadium: Valaya Alongkorn Rajabhat University Stadium |

| 1 July 2015 | Singburi | 0 – 2 | Sisaket | Chainat |
| 18:00 (UTC+7) | | report | Adefolarin Durosinmi 50'; Gerasim Zakov 82' (pen.) | Stadium: Khao Plong Stadium |

| 1 July 2015 | BBCU | 1 – 3 | Bangkok Glass | Nonthaburi |
| 18:00 (UTC+7) | Naret Ritpitakwong 52' | report | Pravinwat Boonyong 36' (pen.); Matt Smith 50'; Bordin Phala 90' | Stadium: Nonthaburi Municipality Stadium |

| 1 July 2015 | Dome | 0 – 2 | Ayutthaya | Pathum Thani |
| 18:00 (UTC+7) | | report | Permyot Tokeaw 40'; Khampheng Sayavutthi 84' | Stadium: Thammasat Stadium |

| 1 July 2015 | Pattaya United | 2 – 1 | Thai Port | Chonburi |
| 18:00 (UTC+7) | Chaiyawat Buran 45'; Lee Won-young 75' | report | Ekkapoom Potharungroj 61' | Stadium: Dolphins Stadium |

| 1 July 2015 | Thai Honda | 2 – 4 (a.e.t.) | Army United | Bangkok |
| 18:00 (UTC+7) | Pornchai Ardjinda 68'; Tawin Butsombat 76' | report | Kanok Koryangphueak 52'; Thossawat Limwannasathian 65'; Tanakorn Dangthong 104'; Ernesto Amantegui 110' | Stadium: 72nd Anniversary Stadium |

| 1 July 2015 | Lampang | 0 – 2 | Nakhon Ratchasima | Lampang |
| 18:00 (UTC+7) | | report | Dominic Adiyiah 22'; Yuttana Ruangsuksut 57' | Stadium: Lampang Stadium |

| 1 July 2015 | Phrae United | 3 – 2 (a.e.t.) | Suphanburi | Phrae |
| 18:00 (UTC+7) | Suriyaphong Phethan 38', 71'; Atthapon Wongsunthron 113' | report | Supoj Wonghoi 31'; Nathwut Singharach 49' | Stadium: Thunghong Stadium |

| 1 July 2015 | Khon Kaen United | 0(5) – 0(4) | Osotspa | Khon Kaen |
| 18:00 (UTC+7) | | report | | Stadium: Khonkaen Sport School Stadium |

| 1 July 2015 | Prachuap | 0 – 1 | Royal Thai Navy | Prachuap Khiri Khan |
| 18:00 (UTC+7) | | report | Amorn Thammanarm 90+1' | Stadium: Sam Ao Stadium |

| 1 July 2015 | Customs United | 1 – 2 | BEC Tero Sasana | Bangkok |
| 18:00 (UTC+7) | Anusak Laosaengthai 88' | report | Peerapat Notechaiya 8'; Ivan Bošković 21' | Stadium: Lad Krabang 54 Stadium |

| 1 July 2015 | Police United | 2 – 0 (a.e.t.) | SCG Muangthong United | Bangkok |
| 18:00 (UTC+7) | Tana Chanabut 112', 120+1' | report | | Stadium: Boonyachinda Stadium |

| 1 July 2015 | Krabi | 1 – 2 | Ratchaburi | Krabi |
| 18:00 (UTC+7) | Aran Klongmodkan 53' | report | Adisak Srikampang 11'; Phuwadol Suwannachart 27' | Stadium: Krabi Stadium |

| 1 July 2015 | Lamphun Warrior | 2 – 1 | Bangkok United | Lamphun |
| 19:00 (UTC+7) | Teerawut Wongtan 45'; Chayapol Udonphan 48' | report | Anthony Ampaipitakwong 8' | Stadium: Mae Guang Stadium |

| 1 July 2015 | Ang Thong | 0 – 4 | Buriram United | Ang Thong |
| 19:00 (UTC+7) | | report | Chaowat Veerachat 32'; Diogo 42', 43'; Nattawut Sombatyotha 62' | Stadium: Ang Thong Stadium |

== Third round ==
| 22 July 2015 | Loei City | 2 – 3 (a.e.t.) | Sisaket | Loei |
| 15:30 (UTC+7) | Banluesak Yodyingyong 89'; Pouya Hosseini 96' | report | Kabfah Boonmatoon 90+3'; Kaneung Buransook 110', 111' | Stadium: River Side Stadium |

| 22 July 2015 | Police United | 3 – 2 (a.e.t.) | Ratchaburi | Bangkok |
| 18:00 (UTC+7) | Tana Chanabut 67' (pen.); Surachart Sareepim 82' | report | Heberty 28'; Genki Nagasato 44'; Henri Jöel 92' (o.g.) | Stadium: Boonyachinda Stadium |

| 22 July 2015 | Khon Kaen United | 2 – 0 | Nakhon Ratchasima | Khon Kaen |
| 18:00 (UTC+7) | Kim Mung-yu 7'; Samuel Kwaku Danquah 84' | report | | Stadium: Khonkaen Sport School Stadium |

| 22 July 2015 | Phrae United | 3 – 0 | Royal Thai Navy | Phrae |
| 18:00 (UTC+7) | Stephane Armand 4'; Aboubacar Sanogo Junior 65', 87' | report | | Stadium: Thunghong Stadium; Referee: Suprem Nonthawong; Assistant referees: Woraphong Prasertsri, Issaraphap Tiankhuntod; Fourth official: Chingchai Fudsuphab |

| 22 July 2015 | Bangkok Glass | 0(2) – 0(4) | Buriram United | Pathum Thani |
| 19:00 (UTC+7) | | report | | Stadium: Leo Stadium; Referee: Juktrawut Jullamas; Assistant referees: Tanin Ruenjit, Natthakorn Chimpalee; Fourth official: Sumet Saiwaew |

| 22 July 2015 | Ayutthaya | 0 – 1 (a.e.t.) | Army United | Ayutthaya |
| 19:00 (UTC+7) | | report | Melvin de Leeuw 102' | Stadium: Ayutthaya Province Stadium |

| 22 July 2015 | Lamphun Warrior | 1(4) – 1(2) | BEC Tero Sasana | Lamphun |
| 19:00 (UTC+7) | Teerawut Wongtan 22' (pen.) | report | Greg Nwokolo 88' | Stadium: Mae Guang Stadium; Referee: Viritphol Pluemsilp; Assistant referees: Dusit Iamsakul, Nonthanan Khanthawong; Fourth official: Panumas Phansamo |

| 22 July 2015 | Pattaya United | 3 – 1 | Chonburi | Chonburi |
| 19:00 (UTC+7) | Milan Bubalo 18'; Sivakorn Tiatrakul 44'; Wattana Plainum 82' | report | Juliano Mineiro 34' | Stadium: Dolphins Stadium; Referee: Ketdamrong Khemthong; Assistant referees: Thayanan Hooto, Ruangsak Nupuak; Fourth official: Naruphol Sawasdee |

== Quarter-finals ==
| Team 1 | Agg. | Team 2 | 1st leg | 2nd leg |
|---|---|---|---|---|
| Phrae United | 1 - 5 | Police United | 0 - 3 | 1 - 2 |
| Khon Kaen United | 0 - 5 | Army United | 0 - 2 | 0 - 3 |
| Pattaya United | 4 - 7 | Sisaket | 1 - 3 | 3 - 4 |
| Lamphun Warrior | 1 - 7 | Buriram United | 0 - 0 | 1 - 7 |

=== 1st leg ===
| 5 August 2015 | Phrae United | 0 – 3 | Police United | Phrae |
| 18:00 (UTC+7) | | report | Surachart Sareepim 51'; Teeratep Winothai 69'; Sho Shimoji 73' | Stadium: Thunghong Stadium; Referee: Taweechai Supatwan; Assistant referees: Nonthanan Kanthawong, Palakorn Parasathit; Fourth official: Sakarin Samaksamarn |

| 5 August 2015 | Khon Kaen United | 0 – 2 | Army United | Khon Kaen |
| 18:00 (UTC+7) | | report | Melvin de Leeuw 18', 70' | Stadium: Khonkaen Sport School Stadium; Referee: Booncharoen Phochai; Assistant referees: Rofig Nimchareon, Thapakorn Thongkorn; Fourth official: Witthaya Saraket |

| 5 August 2015 | Pattaya United | 1 – 3 | Sisaket | Chonburi |
| 19:00 (UTC+7) | Milan Bubalo 55' (pen.) | report | Nuttawut Khamrin 47'; Adefolarin Durosinmi 88'; Jirawat Daokhao 90+3' | Stadium: Dolphins Stadium; Referee: Phumarin Khamruen; Assistant referees: Tanin Reunjit, Rawut Nakrit; Fourth official: Wiswes Sangnakorn |

| 5 August 2015 | Lamphun Warrior | 0 – 0 | Buriram United | Lamphun |
| 19:00 (UTC+7) | | report | | Stadium: Mae Guang Stadium; Referee: Jaktrawut Jullamat; Assistant referees: Nirut Ruangsrichart, Tassanai Sarobol; Fourth official: Chumpol Deeplaeng |

=== 2nd leg ===
| 16 September 2015 | Police United | 2 – 1 | Phrae United | Bangkok |
| 18:00 (UTC+7) | Surachart Sareepim 42' | report | Tetsuro Inoue 57'; Obinna Darlinotow Ajoku 63' (o.g.) | Stadium: Boonyachinda Stadium |

| 16 September 2015 | Sisaket | 4 – 3 | Pattaya United | Sisaket |
| 18:00 (UTC+7) | Victor Amaro 33', 37' (o.g.) | report | Pattara Piyapatrakitti 14', 30' (o.g.); Adisak Waenlor 41' (o.g.); Borja Navarro 50' (pen.); Lee Won-young 59' | Stadium: Sri Nakhon Lamduan Stadium |

| 16 September 2015 | Buriram United | 7 – 1 | Lamphun Warrior | Buriram |
| 18:00 (UTC+7) | Sittichok Kannoo 4'; Diogo 9'; Rafael Coelho 45+3', 49', 78'; Jakkaphan Kaewprom 59'; Andrés Túñez 62' (pen.) | report | Teerawut Wongtan 80' | Stadium: New I-Mobile Stadium |

| 16 September 2015 | Army United | 3 – 0 | Khon Kaen United | Bangkok |
| 19:00 (UTC+7) | Anuwat Noicheunphan 28'; Thossawat Limwannasathian 41'; Kai Hirano 89' | report | | Stadium: Royal Thai Army Stadium |

== Semi-finals ==
| Team 1 | Agg. | Team 2 | 1st leg | 2nd leg |
|---|---|---|---|---|
| Police United | 0 - 1 | Sisaket | 0 - 1 | 0 - 0 |
| Buriram United | 5 - 4 | Army United | 3 - 2 | 2 - 2 |

=== 1st leg ===
| 30 September 2015 | Buriram United | 3 – 2 | Army United | Buriram |
| 18:00 (UTC+7) | Jandson 9', 36'; Jakkaphan Kaewprom 70' | report | Alex 3'; Chatchai Mokkasem 81' | Stadium: New I-Mobile Stadium; Referee: Phumarin Khamruen; Assistant referees: Nathakorn Chimpalee, Tanin Ruenjit; Fourth official: Suprem Nonthawong |

| 30 September 2015 | Police United | 0 – 1 | Sisaket | Bangkok |
| 19:00 (UTC+7) | | report | Nuttawut Khamrin 5' | Stadium: Boonyachinda Stadium; Referee: Taweechai Supatwan; Assistant referees: Decha Thongyoi, Sakarin Samaksamarn; Fourth official: Phannipha Khamnueng |

=== 2nd leg ===
| 21 October 2015 | Sisaket | 0 – 0 | Police United | Sisaket |
| 18:00 (UTC+7) | | report | | Stadium: Sri Nakhon Lamduan Stadium; Referee: Alongkorn Feemuechang; Assistant referees: Binhla Preda, Tassanai Sarobon; Fourth official: Kriangsak Keattisongkram |

| 21 October 2015 | Army United | 2 – 2 | Buriram United | Bangkok |
| 19:00 (UTC+7) | Mongkol Tossakrai 8', 77' | report | Andrés Túñez 37'; Diogo 81' | Stadium: Royal Thai Army Stadium; Referee: Warinthorn Sassadee; Assistant referees: Phattharaphong Kijsathit, Thapana Thaworn; Fourth official: Phummarin Khamruen |

=== Final ===
| 21 November 2015 | Sisaket | 0 - 1 | Buriram United | Bangkok |
| 19:00 (UTC+7) | | report | Go Seul-ki 18' | Stadium: Suphachalasai Stadium; Referee: Alongkorn Feemuechang; Assistant referees: Nathakorn Chimpalee, Kriangsak Kiatsongkram; Fourth official: Suprem Nonthawong |

| Sisaket | Buriram United |

SISAKET:
| GK | 1 | (Thailand) Narong Wongthongkam |
| DF | 3 | (Thailand) Tossapohn Khamengkij | | (substituted off) 69' |
| DF | 5 | (Bulgaria) Lyuben Nikolov |
| DF | 16 | (Thailand) Theerachai Ngamcharoen |
| DF | 17 | (Thailand) Ekkapan Jandakorn (c) |
| MF | 19 | (Thailand) Jakkapong Somboon | | (substituted off) 81' |
| MF | 7 | (Thailand) Kabfah Boonmatoon |
| MF | 22 | (Brazil) Victor Amaro |
| FW | 40 | (Nigeria) Adefolarin Durosinmi | (yellow card) 90+4' |
| FW | 20 | (Thailand) Tatree Seeha | | (substituted off) 46' |
| FW | 29 | (Thailand) Kittipong Wongma | (yellow card) 59' |
Substitutes:
| GK | 34 | (Thailand) Pusit Pongsura |
| DF | 18 | (Thailand) Sakda Fai-in |
| MF | 4 | (Thailand) Anucha Suksa |
| MF | 14 | (Thailand) Nuttawut Khamrin | | (substituted on) 69' |
| MF | 24 | (Thailand) Somsak Wongyai |
| MF | 28 | (Thailand) Jirawat Daokhao | | (substituted on) 81' |
| FW | 9 | (Thailand) Tadpong Lar-tham |
| FW | 11 | (Iran) Mohsen Bayatinia | | (substituted on) 46' |
Manager:
(Thailand) Chalermwoot Sa-Ngapol

BURIRAM UNITED:
| GK | 1 | (Thailand) Sivaruck Tedsungnoen |
| DF | 2 | (Thailand) Theerathon Bunmathan |
| DF | 5 | (Venezuela) Andrés Túñez |
| DF | 16 | (Thailand) Koravit Namwiset | (yellow card) 64' |
| DF | 25 | (Thailand) Suree Sukha |
| MF | 7 | (South Korea) Go Seul-ki |
| MF | 8 | (Thailand) Suchao Nutnum (c) | (yellow card) 87' |
| MF | 10 | (Thailand) Jakkaphan Kaewprom | (yellow card) 45+1' |
| MF | 17 | (Thailand) Anawin Jujeen | (yellow card) 90+3' |
| FW | 20 | (Brazil) Jandson | (yellow card) 87' | (substituted off) 87' |
| FW | 18 | (Thailand) Sittichok Kannoo | | (substituted off) 78' |
Substitutes:
| GK | 37 | (Thailand) Noppol Lakornpol |
| GK | 38 | (Thailand) Niwat Buttakoon |
| DF | 13 | (Thailand) Narubadin Weerawatnodom | | (substituted on) 86' |
| DF | 14 | (Thailand) Chitipat Tanklang |
| DF | 24 | (Thailand) Nukoolkit Krutyai |
| MF | 15 | (Thailand) Surat Sukha |
| MF | 21 | (Thailand) Prakit Deeprom | | (substituted on) 78' |
| MF | 28 | (Thailand) Chaowat Veerachat |
Manager:
(Brazil) Alexandre Gama

== See also ==
- 2015 Thai Premier League
- 2015 Thai Division 1 League
- 2015 Regional League Division 2
- 2015 Thai FA Cup
- 2015 Kor Royal Cup
