= 2014 Regional League Division 2 Central & Eastern Region =

Regional League Central & Eastern Region
- Season: 2014
- Champions: Prachinburi United

2014 Regional League Division 2 Central & Eastern Region is the 6th season of the League competition since its establishment in 2009. It is in the third tier of the Thai football league system.

== Changes from last season ==
=== Team changes ===
==== Promoted clubs ====
No club was promoted to the Thai Division 1 League. Last years league champions Look Isan-Thai Airways and runners up Nakhon Nayok failed to qualify from the 2013 Regional League Division 2 championship pool.

==== Relegated clubs ====
Rayong were relegated from the 2013 Thai Division 1 League

==== Relocated clubs ====
J.W. Rangsit moved into the Regional League Bangkok Area Division 2014.

==== Renamed clubs ====
- Pluak Daeng renamed TG Rayong.
- Look Isan-Thai Airways renamed Pakchong United.

== Stadium and locations ==
Locations of the 2014 Regional League Central & Eastern Region Teams

Team	Location	Stadium	Capacity	Ref.
Cha Choeng Sao	Chachoengsao	Chachoengsao Town municipality Stadium	?	
Chanthaburi	Chanthaburi	Rambhai Barni Rajabhat University Stadium	?	
Kabin United	Prachinburi	Nom Klao Maharaj Stadium	3,000	
Maptaphut Marines	Rayong	Maptaphut Stadium	?	
Nakhon Nayok	Nakhon Nayok	Nakhon Nayok Provincial Administrative Organization Stadium	2,406	
Pakchong United	Nakhon Ratchasima	Rajpracha Sport Resort	?	
Phan Thong	Chonburi	Institute of Physical Education Chonburi Campus Stadium	12,000	
Prachinburi United	Prachinburi	Prachinburi Provincial Administrative Organization Stadium	3,000	
Pathum Thani United	Pathum Thani	Institute of physical education Bangkok Campus Stadium	?	
Royal Thai Fleet	Rayong	Sattahip Navy Stadium	12,500	
Rayong	Rayong	Rayong Province Central Stadium	4,512	
Sa Kaeo	Sa Kaeo	Sa Kaeo Provincial Administrative Organization Stadium	?	
Samut Prakan	Samut Prakan	Lam Fah Pha Subdistrict municipality Stadium	?	
TG Rayong	Rayong	Klaeng District Stadium	?	

Football clubs in Bangkok Metropolitan Region

== League table ==
Pos	Team	Pld	W	D	L	GF	GA	GD	Pts	Qualification
1	Prachinburi United (C, Q)	26	15	9	2	44	15	+29	54	Champions League Round
2	Maptaphut Rayong (Q)	26	15	6	5	52	36	+16	51	Champions League Round
3	Rayong	26	16	4	6	59	26	+33	49 (Note: 3 points were deducted.)	
4	Nakhon Nayok	26	13	10	3	50	21	+29	49	
5	Sa Kaeo	26	13	9	4	55	35	+20	45	
6	Cha Choeng Sao	26	10	10	6	48	36	+12	40	
7	Royal Thai Fleet	26	8	11	7	35	31	+4	35	
8	Chanthaburi	26	10	5	11	38	41	−3	35	
9	Samut Prakan	26	8	10	8	33	38	−5	34	
10	Pathum Thani United	25	6	10	9	31	40	−9	28	
11	Phan Thong	26	7	2	17	35	60	−25	23	
12	Pakchong United	26	5	3	18	31	73	−42	18	
13	Kabin United	26	3	3	20	31	61	−30	12	
14	TG Rayong	26	3	5	18	31	61	−30	11	

Source: ^{[usurped]}
Rules for classification: 1) points; 2) head-to-head points; 3) head-to-head goal difference; 4) head-to-head goals scored; 5) goal difference; 6) number of goals scored.
(C) Champions; (Q) Qualified for the phase indicated
