= Yuththachai Liamkrai =

Thai footballer (born 1987)

Personal information
- Full name: Yuththachai Liamkrai
- Date of birth: 2 June 1987 (age 39)
- Place of birth: Thailand
- Height: 1.86 m (6 ft 1 in)
- Position: Midfielder

Team information
- Current team: MOF Customs United
- Number: 38

Senior career*
Years	Team	Apps	(Gls)
2006–2011	Chainat	0	(0)
2012	Ayutthaya	0	(0)
2013	Army United	0	(0)
2013	Phayao	0	(0)
2014	Looktabfah	0	(0)
2015	Saraburi	17	(1)
2016–2017	Angthong	24	(1)
2018–	MOF Customs United	0	(0)
- * Club domestic league appearances and goals as of 25 October 2015

Yuththachai Liamkrai (Thai ยุทธิชัย เหลี่ยมไกร, born 2 June 1987) is a Thai professional footballer.

== Honours ==
=== Club ===
Ayutthaya F.C.

- Regional League Division 2 Champions (1) : 2012
