= 1997–98 Thailand Division 1 League =

Thailand Division 1 League
- Season: 1997/98
- Champions: Krung Thai Bank
- Relegated: Thamrong Thai Samosorn
- Top goalscorer: (Cameroon) Bailey Yep (Thailand Tobacco Monopoly) (18)

The 1997–98 Thailand Division 1 League was its first season. A total of 10 teams participated, with 6 teams relegated from the Thailand Soccer League and 4 teams promoted from the Khǒr Royal Cup.

== Member clubs locations ==
6 clubs relegated from 1996–97 Thailand Soccer League

- Thailand Tobacco Monopoly
- Osotsapa
- Bangkok Bank of Commerce
- Chula-Raj-Vithi (Rajvithi-Agfatech)
- Krung Thai Bank
- Thamrong Thai Samosorn (Singha-Thamrongthai)

4 clubs promoted from 1996 Khǒr Royal Cup

- Rayong-Rajapruk (Rayong Sport Association)
- Chonburi-Sannibat-Samut Prakan (Samut Prakan Confederation)
- Crown Property Bureau
- Bank for Agriculture (Bank for agriculture and agricultural co-operatives)

== Final league table ==
Pos	Team	Pld	W	D	L	GF	GA	GD	Pts	Promotion or relegation
1	Krung Thai Bank (P)	18	12	3	3	35	15	+20	39	Champion and promotion spot for the 1998 Thai Premier League
2	Osotsapa (P)	18	12	2	4	36	17	+19	38	Promotion spot for the 1998 Thai Premier League
3	Thailand Tobacco Monopoly	18	11	4	3	41	13	+28	37	
4	Chonburi-Sannibat-Samut Prakan	18	10	5	3	34	45	−11	35	
5	Bangkok Bank of Commerce	18	8	4	6	33	22	+11	28	
6	Bank for Agriculture	18	7	3	8	28	30	−2	24	
7	Crown Property Bureau	18	5	5	8	27	31	−4	20	
8	Rayong-Rajapruk	18	5	3	10	23	38	−15	18	
9	Chula-Raj-Vithi	18	4	0	14	16	35	−19	12	Promotion/relegation playoff
10	Thamrong Thai Samosorn (R)	18	1	1	16	20	13	+7	4	Relegation spots to Khǒr Royal Cup

Updated to match(es) played on 21 January 2018. Source:
Rules for classification: 1) points; 2) goal difference; 3) number of goals scored.
(P) Promoted; (R) Relegated

== Promotion and relegation Playoff ==
The club that came 9th would play in a relegation / promotion match against the runner-up in the Khǒr Royal Cup.

February 17, 1998

Team 1	Result	Team 2
† Chula-Raj-Vithi	3-0	Petroleum Authority of Thailand

† Chula-Raj-Vithi remain at the Thailand Division 1 League.
