= 2012 Regional League Division 2 Central & Eastern Region =

Regional League Central & Eastern Division
- Season: 2012

2012 Regional League Division 2 Central & Eastern Region is the 4th season of the League competition since its establishment in 2009. It is in the third tier of the Thai football league system.

== Changes from last season ==
=== Team changes ===
==== Promoted clubs ====
Ratchaburi were promoted to the 2012 Thai Division 1 League after winning the 2011 Regional League Division 2 championship pool.

==== Relocated clubs ====
Maptaphut Rayong, Royal Thai Fleet, Thanyaburi RA United re-located to the Regional League Central-East Division from the Regional League Bangkok Area Region 2011.

Samut Sakhon have all been moved into the Regional League Bangkok Area Region 2012.

==== Expansion clubs ====
Trat joined the newly expanded league setup.

==== Renamed clubs ====
- Sa Kaeo City renamed Sa Kaeo.

==== Renamed clubs ====
- Thanyaburi RA United renamed Looktabfah F.C.

== Stadium and locations ==
Locations of the Regional League Central & Eastern Region Teams 2012
Football clubs in Bangkok Metropolitan Region

Team	Location	Stadium	Capacity	Ref.
Ang Thong	Ang Thong	Ang Thong Provincial Administrative Organization Stadium	5,500	
Ayutthaya	Ayutthaya	Ayutthaya Province Stadium	6,000	
Cha Choeng Sao	Chachoengsao	Cha Choeng Sao Province Stadium	?	
Gracku Looktabfah	Pathum Thani	Queen Sirikit 60th Anniversary Stadium	?	
Lopburi	Lopburi	Phra Ramesuan Stadium	5,334	
Kabin City	Prachinburi	Nom Klao Maharaj Stadium	3,000	
Maptaphut Marines	Rayong	Maptaphut Stadium	?	
Muangkan United	Kanchanaburi	Kanchanaburi Stadium	13,000	
Nakhon Nayok	Nakhon Nayok	Nakhon Nayok Province Stadium	2,406	
Phetchaburi	Phetchaburi	Phetchaburi Province Stadium	6,575	
Prachuap	Prachuap Khiri Khan	Prachuap Khiri Khan Province Stadium	7,000	
Prachinburi United	Prachinburi	Prachinburi Province Stadium	3,000	
Pathum Thani United	Pathum Thani	Valaya Alongkorn Rajabhat University Stadium IPE Bangkok Stadium	? ?	
Rayong	Rayong	Rayong Province Stadium	7,000	
Royal Thai Fleet	Rayong	Sattahip Navy Stadium	12,500	
Sa Kaeo	Wang Nam Yen, Sa Kaeo	Wangnamyen municipality Stadium	?	
Samut Prakan	Min Buri, Bangkok Bang Phli, Samut Prakan	Chalerm Phrakiat 72nd Anniversary Min Buri Stadium Samut Prakarn Province Stadium (Bang Pla)	8,500 ?	
Trat	Trat	Trat Province Stadium	4,000	

== League table ==
Pos	Team	Pld	W	D	L	GF	GA	GD	Pts	Qualification
1	Ayutthaya (C, Q)	34	25	8	1	72	26	+46	83	Champions League Round
2	Rayong (Q)	34	24	7	3	72	30	+42	79	Champions League Round
3	Trat (Q)	34	20	11	3	66	34	+32	71	Champions League Round
4	Ang Thong	34	21	7	6	72	28	+44	70	
5	Phetchaburi	34	15	12	7	43	27	+16	57	
6	Sa Kaeo	34	15	9	10	35	32	+3	54	
7	Prachuap	34	13	12	9	45	33	+12	51	
8	Prachinburi United	34	13	9	12	46	48	−2	48	
9	Maptaphut Marines	34	13	6	15	48	45	+3	45	
10	Lopburi	34	11	11	12	40	39	+1	44	
11	Muangkan	34	10	8	16	30	42	−12	38	
12	Cha Choeng Sao	34	10	6	18	33	48	−15	36	
13	Samut Prakan	34	7	12	15	29	49	−20	33	
14	Gracku Looktabfah	34	7	12	15	37	62	−25	33	
15	Royal Thai Fleet	34	6	12	16	23	36	−13	30	
16	Nakhon Nayok	34	6	10	18	34	51	−17	28	
17	Pathum Thani United	34	6	9	19	25	43	−18	27	
18	Kabin City	33	1	5	27	15	80	−65	8	1 year suspension

Updated to match(es) played on 15 September 2012. Source:
Rules for classification: 1) points; 2) head-to-head points; 3) head-to-head goal difference; 4) head-to-head goals scored; 5) goal difference; 6) number of goals scored.
(C) Champions; (Q) Qualified for the phase indicated
