= David Le Bras =

French footballer (born 1983)

David Le Bras (born 4 October 1983 in La Flèche in France) is a French football player, who currently plays for Phrae United F.C., Division 2 in Thailand.

== Career ==
After professional football school in Stade Rennais F.C. he went to several countries, Belgium, Finland, Switzerland in Europe and Malaysia, Thailand in Asia.

=== Clubs ===
- 1989–1996: AS Saint-Pierre Montrevault (France)
- 1996–2003: Stade Rennais F.C. (France)
- 2003–2004: KSK Beveren (Belgium)
- 2004–2005: FCV Dender EH (Belgium)
- 2005–2006: FC Lorient (France)
- 2006–2007: PP-70 (Finland)
- 2007: BEC Tero Sasana FC (Thailand)
- 2008: Chonburi FC (Thailand)
- 2008: Kelantan FA (Malaysia)
- 2009: FC Kreuzlingen (Switzerland)
- 2009: Urania Genève Sport – (Switzerland)
- 2010–2012: Nakhon Ratchasima F.C. (Thailand)
- 2013:Rayong United F.C., Air Force Central F.C.(Thailand)
- 2014: Sa Kaeo F.C. (Thailand)
- 2015: Saraburi TRU F.C. (Thailand)
- 2016: Phrae United F.C. (Thailand)
- 2017: Nakhon Nayok F.C. (Thailand)
- 2018:End of career.

=== Position ===
He played as offensive midfielder
