= Kabin City F.C. =

Thai football club

Kabin City FC กบินทร์ ซิตี้
- Full name: Kabin City Football Club สโมสรฟุตบอลกบินทร์ ซิตี้
- Nickname: Hanuman warrior
- Founded: 2010; 16 years ago as Kabinburi; 2011; 15 years ago as Kabin City 2016; 10 years ago as Sinthana Kabinburi; 2017; 9 years ago as Surat Thani City
- Ground: Prachinburi, Thailand
- Capacity: –
- Chairman: Pol.Sen.Sgt.Maj. Pongphan Wongsuban
- Manager: Pol.Sen.Sgt.Maj. Pongphan Wongsuban
- League: Regional League Division 2

Kabin City Football Club (Thai: สโมสรฟุตบอลกบินทร์ ซิตี้) is a Thai football club based in Amphoe Kabin Buri, Prachinburi Province. The club currently play in Regional League Division 2 Central & Eastern. This football is old Officer themself (Pol.Sen.Sgt.Maj. Pongphan Wongsuban).

== Stadium and locations ==
| Coordinates | Location | Stadium | Capacity | Year |
|---|---|---|---|---|
| 13°59′20″N 101°43′25″E | Prachinburi | Nom Klao Maharaj Stadium | ? | 2010–2012 |

== Season by season record ==
| Season | League | | | | | | | | | FA Cup | League Cup |
| Season | Division | P | W | D | L | F | A | Pts | Pos | FA Cup | League Cup |
|---|---|---|---|---|---|---|---|---|---|---|---|
| 2010 | Central-East | 30 | 3 | 5 | 22 | 25 | 77 | 14 | 15th | | |
| 2011 | Central-East | 30 | 5 | 6 | 19 | 26 | 76 | 21 | 15th | | |
| 2012 | Central-East | 33 | 1 | 5 | 27 | 15 | 80 | 8 | 18th | | |
| 2016 | Bangkok-East | 18 | 4 | 2 | 12 | 15 | 29 | 14 | 10th | | 1st Qualification |

== See also ==
- Surat Thani City F.C.
- Kabin United F.C.
