= Rapepat Nakphet =

Thai footballer (born 1986)

Personal information
- Full name: Rapepat Nakphet
- Date of birth: 30 October 1986 (age 39)
- Place of birth: Lopburi, Thailand
- Height: 1.76 m (5 ft 9 1/2 in)
- Position: Midfielder

Team information
- Current team: Ayutthaya
- Number: 21

Senior career*
Years	Team	Apps	(Gls)
2010–2014	Air Force United		
2015–	Ayutthaya		
- * Club domestic league appearances and goals

Rapepat Nakphet (Thai: รพีพัชร นาคเพ็ชร, born October 30, 1986) is a Thai professional footballer.
