= Surat Narkchumsang =

Thai footballer

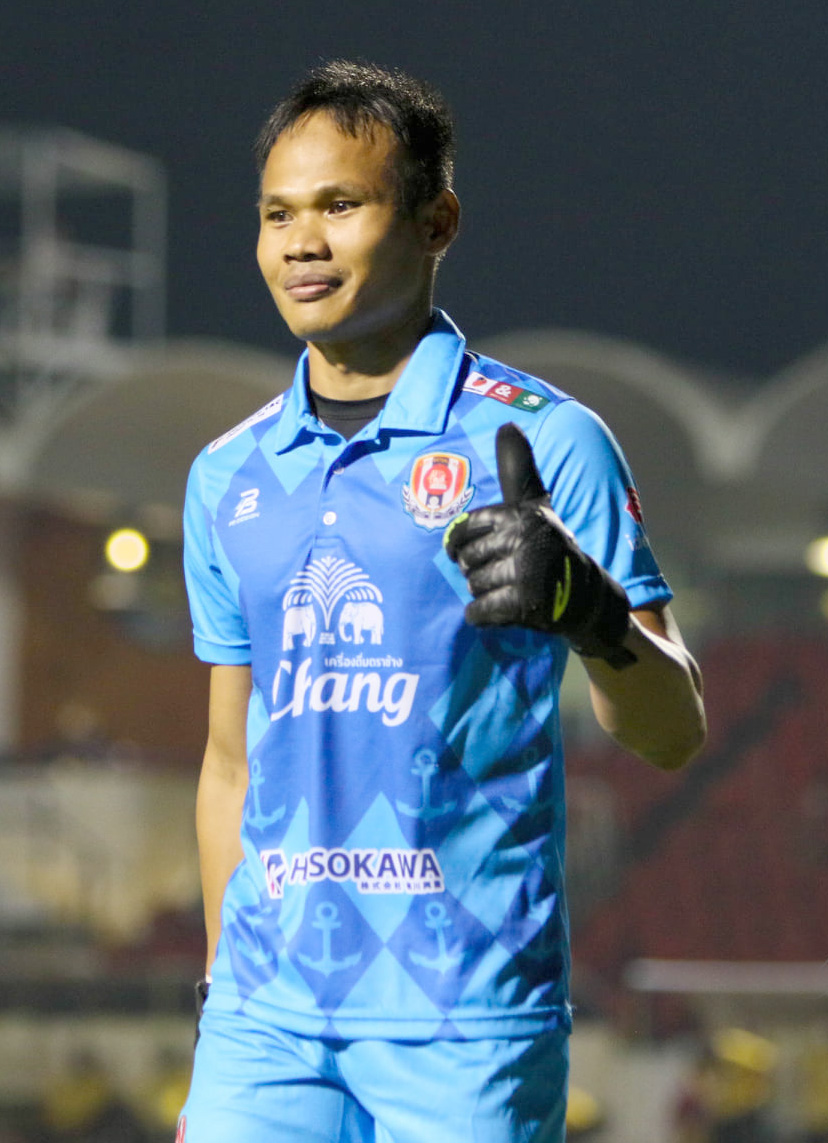
- Nakchumsang in 2001

Personal information
- Date of birth: 30 December 1980 (age 45)
- Place of birth: Thailand
- Height: 1.80 m (5 ft 11 in)
- Position: Goalkeeper

Team information
- Current team: Fleet
- Number: 32

Senior career*
Years	Team	Apps	(Gls)
2015	Navy	9	(0)
2016–2018	Rayong		
2019–2022	Navy	15	(0)
2022–	Fleet	12	(0)
- * Club domestic league appearances and goals as of 18 March 2023

Surat Narkchumsang (Thai: สุรัตน์ นาคชุมแสง, born 30 December 1980), also spelled Nakchumsang, is a Thai professional footballer who plays for Fleet in Thai League 3 as a goalkeeper.
