= 2017 Thai League 4 Western Region =

Thai League 4 Western Region
- Season: 2017
- Champions: Suphanburi B
- Relegated: Pathum Thani United
- Matches played: 135
- Goals scored: 396 (2.93 per match)
- Top goalscorer: Oleirva Silva Diego (13 Goals)
- Biggest home win: Assumption United 6–0 Look Isan (2 September 2017)
- Biggest away win: Look Isan 0–4 Suphanburi B (9 July 2017); Nonthaburi 0–4 Hua Hin City (20 August 2017)
- Highest scoring: Hua Hin City 5–2 IPE Samut Sakhon United (26 March 2017); BTU United 4–3 Assumption United (27 May 2017) (26 March 2017); Ratchaburi Mitr Phol B 4–3 Nonthaburi (2 July 2017); BTU United 6–1 Pathum Thani United (8 July 2017)
- Longest winning run: 9 matches Suphanburi B
- Longest unbeaten run: 9 matches Suphanburi B
- Longest losing run: 13 matches Pathum Thani United
- Highest attendance: 865; Nonthaburi 0–4 Hua Hin City (20 August 2017)
- Lowest attendance: 50; Pathum Thani United 1–2 Muangkan United (27 May 2017); Hua Hin City 3–0 Pathum Thani United (5 August 2017); Nonthaburi 2–1 Look Isan (12 August 2017)
- Total attendance: 36,737
- Average attendance: 284

2017 Thai League 4 Western Region is the 5th season of the League competition since its establishment in 2013. It is in the 4th tier of the Thai football league system.

== Changes from last season ==
=== Promoted clubs ===
Four club was promoted to the 2017 Thai League 3 Southern Region.

- Samut Sakhon
- Krung Thonburi
- Ratchaphruek University
- Simork

=== Relegated clubs ===
- Thonburi City were relegated to the 2016 Thai Division 3 Tournament Central Region with were collapsed Thonburi University.

=== Relocated clubs ===
- Look Isan and Pathum Thani United were moved from the Bangkok & Eastern 2016.
- Chumphon were moved to the 2017 Thai League 4 Southern Region.

=== Expansion clubs ===
- BTU United was promoted to the 2017 Thai League 3 but this Club-licensing football club didn't pass to play 2017 Thai League 3. This team is relegated to 2017 Thai League 4 Western Region again.

=== Reserving clubs ===
- Ratchaburi B is Ratchaburi Reserving this team which join Northern Region first time.
- Suphanburi B is Suphanburi Reserving this team which join Northern Region first time.

== Teams ==
=== Stadium and locations ===
Locations of the 2017 Thai League 4 Western Region Teams
Football clubs in Bangkok Metropolitan Region

Team	Province	Stadium	Ref.
Assumption United	Bangkok	Assumption Thonburi School Stadium (Wongprachanukul Stadium)	
BTU United	Bangkok	Bangkok-Thonburi University Stadium	
Hua Hin City	Prachuap Khiri Khan	Khao Takiap Stadium	
IPE Samut Sakhon United	Samut Sakhon	IPE Samut Sakhon Stadium	
Look Isan	Bangkok	Ramkhamhaeng University Stadium	
Muangkan United	Kanchanaburi	Kleeb Bua Stadium	
Nonthaburi	Nonthaburi	Nonthaburi Sports Complex Stadium	
Pathum Thani United	Pathum Thani	IPE Bangkok Stadium	
Ratchaburi Mitr Phol B	Ratchaburi	Ratchaburi Province Stadium	
Suphanburi B	Suphan Buri	Suphan Buri Provincial Stadium	

== League table ==
Pos	Team	Pld	W	D	L	GF	GA	GD	Pts	Qualification or relegation
1	Suphanburi B (Note: Suphanburi B was a reserved team of Suphanburi in T1. So, they could not qualified to champions league round by the rules of FA Thailand.) (C)	27	20	4	3	58	22	+36	64	
2	Muangkan United (Q, P)	27	17	5	5	40	21	+19	56	Qualification to the Thai League 4 Champions League
3	BTU United (Q, P)	27	15	6	6	48	28	+20	51	Qualification to the Thai League 4 Champions League
4	Assumption United	27	14	6	7	46	24	+22	48	
5	Ratchaburi Mitr Phol B	27	11	6	10	45	42	+3	39	
6	IPE Samut Sakhon United	27	11	5	11	39	40	−1	38	
7	Huahin City	27	9	2	16	35	40	−5	29	
8	Look E-San	27	7	6	14	37	56	−19	27	
9	Nonthaburi	27	7	5	15	32	50	−18	26	
10	Pathum Thani United (R)	27	1	1	25	17	74	−57	4	Relegation to the 2018 Thailand Amateur League

Updated to match(es) played on 20 October 2017. Source: Thai League 4
Rules for classification: 1) Points; 2) Head-to-head points; 3) Head-to-head goals difference; 4) Head-to-head goals scored; 5) Overall goals difference; 6) Overall goals scored; 7) Fair play points; 8) Play-off without extra time;).
(C) Champions; (P) Promoted; (Q) Qualified for the phase indicated; (R) Relegated

== Results 1st and 2nd match for each team ==
Home \ Away	ASS	BTUU	HUA	IPES	LI	MKU	NON	PTU	RATB	SUPB
Assumption United		0–0	1–0	2–1	2–0	2–0	2–1	2–0	0–0	1–0
BTU United	4–3		1–1	1–0	1–0	0–1	3–1	6–1	1–1	2–3
Hua Hin City	1–0	1–2		5–3	2–4	0–1	0–1	2–1	0–1	0–1
IPE Samut Sakhon United	1–3	1–0	1–2		0–3	1–0	2–1	1–1	1–1	0–1
Look Isan	1–2	2–4	1–0	3–1		2–2	1–1	3–2	1–1	0–4
Muangkan United	1–0	4–1	1–0	4–1	2–2		2–0	1–0	2–0	2–1
Nonthaburi	0–0	0–1	2–0	1–1	2–1	0–0		3–0	4–1	1–3
Pathum Thani United	0–1	1–2	1–3	0–3	1–3	1–2	1–3		2–3	0–3
Ratchaburi B	0–3	0–0	1–2	3–2	5–2	0–2	4–3	2–1		3–3
Suphanburi B	2–1	1–0	2–1	1–1	2–0	1–0	5–0	3–0	5–2	

Updated to match(es) played on 9 July 2017. Source: Thai League 4
Legend: Blue = home team win; Yellow = draw; Red = away team win.

== Results 3rd match for each team ==
In the third leg, the winner on head-to-head result of the first and the second leg will be home team. If head-to-head result are tie, must to find the home team from head-to-head goals different. If all of head-to-head still tie, must to find the home team from penalty kickoff on the end of each second leg match (This penalty kickoff don't bring to calculate points on league table, it's only the process to find the home team on third leg).

Home \ Away	ฺASS	ฺBTUU	HUA	IPES	LI	MKU	NON	PTU	RATB	SUPB
Assumption United			3–1	1–2	6–0	1–1	3–3	5–1	0–1	1–2
BTU United	1–1		4–1		2–0		2–0	3–0	2–2	
Hua Hin City				1–2				3–0	2–1	
IPE Samut Sakhon United		0–2					3–1	3–1		
Look Isan			1–1	0–2				4–0		
Muangkan United		1–0	1–0	0–2	2–2		4–2	3–1	0–1	
Nonthaburi			0–4		2–1			0–1	0–4	
Pathum Thani United										
Ratchaburi Mitr Phol B				0–2	4–0			4–0		
Suphanburi B		2–2	3–2	2–2	3–0	0–1	1–0	3–0	1–0	

Updated to match(es) played on 9 September 2017. Source: Thai League 4
Legend: Blue = home team win; Yellow = draw; Red = away team win.

== Season statistics ==
=== Top scorers ===
As of 9 September 2017.

Rank	Player	Club	Goals
1	(Brazil) Diego Oliveira Silva	BTU United	13
2	(South Korea) Lee Heon-ju	Mukdahan Chaiyuenyong (7), BTU United (5)	12
2	(Thailand) Natpasut Malison	Assumption United	12
4	(Guinea) Almamy Sylla	Look Isan	11
4	(Thailand) Natthawut Namthip	BTU United	11
4	(Thailand) Janepob Phokie	Suphanburi B	11
4	(Nigeria) Opara Kingsley	Nonthaburi	11
8	(Thailand) Supanai Baipa-om	Look Isan	10
9	(Thailand) Nattapol Onjoy	Muangkan United	9
10	(Thailand) Chananon Wisetbumrungcharoen	Assumption United	8
10	(Thailand) Arnon Kaimook	Hua Hin City	8
10	(Thailand) Nutchawit Khunnak	IPE Samut Sakhon United	8

== Attendance ==
Pos	Team	Total	High	Low	Average	Change
1	BTU United	6,814	671	350	454	n/a
2	Suphanburi B	5,856	562	320	418	n/a
3	Nonthaburi	4,940	865	50	380	n/a
4	Muangkan United	5,651	650	203	353	n/a
5	Assumption United	4,269	420	215	284	n/a
6	IPE Samut Sakhon United	2,088	378	150	189	n/a
7	Ratchaburi Mitr Phol B	1,955	254	100	162	n/a
8	Look Isan	1,853	300	70	154	n/a
9	Hua Hin City	1,835	300	50	152	n/a
10	Pathum Thani United	876	216	50	97	n/a
	League total	36,737	865	50	284	n/a

Updated to games played on 9 September 2017
Source: Thai League 4

== See also ==
- 2017 Thai League
- 2017 Thai League 2
- 2017 Thai League 3
- 2017 Thai League 4
- 2017 Thailand Amateur League
- 2017 Thai FA Cup
- 2017 Thai League Cup
- 2017 Thailand Champions Cup
