= Look E-San F.C. =

Thai football club

Look E-San F.C. ลูกอีสาน เอฟ.ซี.
- Full name: Look E-San Football Club สโมสรฟุตบอลลูกอีสาน
- Nicknames: Nakhin King (พญานาคิน)
- Founded: 2002; 24 years ago, as Thai Airways; 2010; 16 years ago, as Look E-San Thai Airways; 2014; 12 years ago, as Pakchong United; 2016; 10 years ago, as Look E-San
- Ground: Youth Center Municipality of Nonthaburi Stadium; Nonthaburi, Thailand
- Capacity: 6,000
- Chairman: Anucha Chaiyated
- Coach: Usman Sharif
- League: Thai League 4
Home colours	Away colours

Look E-San Football Club (Thai สโมสรฟุตบอลลูกอีสาน) is a Thai football club based in Nakhon Ratchasima Province. The club currently plays in the Thai League 4 Western Region.

In 2012, the club signed an agreement with Police United to become their feeder club, using several of their youth players. The team also moved to play home games at the Bunyajinda Stadium in Bangkok.

In 2016, the club signed an agreement with Look E-San after break in 2015. The team also moved to play home games at Phutianan 2 Sport club in Sukhumvit, Bangkok.

== Stadium and locations ==
Coordinates	Location	Stadium	Year
13°43′49″N 100°46′20″E	Lat Krabang, Bangkok	King Mongkut's Institute of Technology Ladkrabang Stadium	2007
13°46′41″N 100°38′42″E	Bang Kapi, Bangkok	Klong Chan Sports Center	2008
13°18′09″N 101°12′24″E	Ban Bueng, Chonburi	Beer Chang Stadium	2009
13°45′16″N 100°36′59″E	Bang Kapi, Bangkok	Ramkhamhaeng University Stadium	2010
14°08′00″N 100°36′26″E	Pathum Thani	Valaya Alongkorn Rajabhat University Stadium	2011
13°45′16″N 100°36′59″E	Bang Kapi, Bangkok	Ramkhamhaeng University Stadium	2012
13°52′02″N 100°34′39″E	Lak Si, Bangkok	Boonyachinda Stadium	2012
14°04′04″N 100°35′55″E	Pathum Thani	Thammasat Stadium	2013
14°41′14″N 101°24′42″E	Nakhon Ratchasima	Rajpracha Sport Resort	2014
13°45′16″N 100°36′59″E	Bang Kapi, Bangkok	Ramkhamhaeng University Stadium	2016–2017
13°52′44″N 100°32′39″E	Mueang, Nonthaburi	Youth Center Municipality of Nonthaburi Stadium	2019–

== Seasons ==
Season	League									FA Cup	League Cup	Top goalscorer	
Season	Division	P	W	D	L	F	A	Pts	Pos	FA Cup	League Cup	Name	Goals
2006	DIV1												
2007	DIV1 A	22	6	10	6	19	21	28	7th				
2008	DIV1	30	9	12	9	30	29	39	11th				
2009	DIV1	30	7	9	14	36	50	30	15th				
2010	DIV2 Bangkok	24	7	6	11	24	36	27	9th				
2011	DIV2 Bangkok	30	2	8	20	21	66	14	16th				
2012	DIV2 Bangkok	34	7	9	18	32	55	30	15th				
2013	DIV2 Central-East	26	17	6	3	51	18	57	1st				
2014	DIV2 Central-East	26	5	3	18	31	73	18	12th				
2015	Not enter	–	–	–	–	–	–	–	–	–	–	–	–
2016	DIV2 Bangkok-East	18	5	9	4	25	24	24	5th	Not Enter	R1		
2017	T4 West	27	7	6	14	37	56	27	8th	Not Enter	Not Enter	(Guinea) Almamy Sylla	11
2018	T4 West	24	9	2	13	31	42	29	6th	Not Enter	Not Enter	(Ghana) Dennis Borketey	12
2019	T4 West	24	5	8	11	23	30	23	8th	Not Enter	Not Enter	(Thailand) Noppadol Juijaiherm (Thailand) Piranun Kerdsorn (Thailand) Thanakorn Pheuansopa	3

Champions	Runners-up	Promoted	Relegated

== Honours ==
=== Domestic Leagues ===
- Regional League Central-East Division
  - Winner (1) : 2013
