= 2010 Regional League Division 2 Central & Eastern Region =

Regional League Central-East Division
- Season: 2010
- Champions: Saraburi
- Matches played: 240
- Goals scored: 652 (2.72 per match)
- Biggest home win: Saraburi 8–0 Nakhon Nayok (9 May 2010)
- Biggest away win: Sa Kaeo United 2–7 Samut Sakhon (25 August 2010)
- Highest scoring: Muangkan 8–1 Ang Thong (22 May 2010); Sa Kaeo United 2–7 Samut Sakhon (25 August 2010) (9 goals)

2010 Regional League Division 2 Central & Eastern Region is the 2nd season of the League competition since its establishment in 2009. It is in the third tier of the Thai football league system.

The league has been expanded from 12 clubs in 2009 to 16 clubs this season. The league winners and runners up will qualify for the 2010 Regional League Division 2 championship stage.

== Changes from last season ==
=== Team changes ===
==== Relocated clubs ====
- Thai Summit Samut Prakan and Rose Asia Pathum Thani re-located to the Regional League Bangkok Area Division 2010.
- Prachuap Khiri Khan re-located to the Regional League Southern Region 2010

==== Expansion clubs ====
Samut Sakhon, Muangkan, Phetchaburi, Ang Thong, Sa Kaeo, Prachinburi United, Pathum Thani and Kabinburi joined the newly expanded league setup.

== Stadium and locations ==
Locations of the Regional League Central & Eastern Region Teams
Football clubs in Bangkok Metropolitan Region

Team	Location	Stadium	Capacity	Ref.
Ang Thong	Ang Thong	Ang Thong Province Stadium	5,500	
Ayutthaya	Ayutthaya	Ayutthaya Province Stadium	6,000	
Cha Choeng Sao	Chachoengsao	Subin Pimpayachan Stadium	?	
Lopburi	Lopburi	Phra Ramesuan Stadium	?	
Kabinburi	Prachinburi	Nom Klao Maharaj Stadium	3,000	
Muangkan	Kanchanaburi	Kanchanaburi Stadium	13,000	
Nakhon Nayok	Nakhon Nayok	Nakhon Nayok Province Stadium	2,406	
Phetchaburi	Phetchaburi	Donkhan Stadium	3,500	
Saraburi	Saraburi	Saraburi Stadium	6,000	
Prachinburi United	Prachinburi	Prachinburi Province Stadium	3,000	
Pathum Thani	Pathum Thani	Thammasat Stadium	25,000	
Ratchaburi	Ratchaburi	Ratchaburi Province Stadium	10,373	
Rayong	Rayong	Rayong Province Stadium	7,000	
Sa Kaeo United	Sa Kaeo	Aranyaprathet District Stadium	?	
Samut Prakan	Samut Prakan	Customs Department Stadium (1) Samut Prakarn SAT Stadium (Keha Bang Phli)(2)	3,500; 2,000	
Samut Sakhon	Samut Sakhon	IPE Samut Sakhon Stadium	3,000	

== Final league table ==
Pos	Team	Pld	W	D	L	GF	GA	GD	Pts	Qualification
1	Saraburi (C)	30	18	7	5	71	30	+41	61	Champions League Round
2	Samut Prakan	30	15	14	1	43	16	+27	59	Champions League Round
3	Rayong	30	16	10	4	48	24	+24	58	Champions League Round
4	Lopburi	30	15	10	5	56	32	+24	55	
5	Samut Sakhon	30	13	12	5	51	34	+17	51	
6	Ayutthaya	30	15	5	10	42	31	+11	50 (Note: MUK 1–2 ATY; ATY 0–0 MUK)	
7	Muangkan	30	13	11	6	44	27	+17	50	
8	Phetchaburi	30	12	10	8	39	27	+12	46	
9	Ratchaburi	30	12	9	9	45	39	+6	45	
10	Pathum Thani	30	10	12	8	35	31	+4	42	
11	Prachinburi United	30	10	5	15	44	46	−2	35	
12	Cha Choeng Sao	30	7	11	12	27	40	−13	32	
13	Ang Thong	30	5	8	17	33	53	−20	23 (Note: NNY 0–1 ANT; ANT 1–1 NNY)	
14	Nakhon Nayok	30	6	5	19	25	65	−40	23	
15	Kabinburi	30	3	5	22	25	77	−52	14	
16	Sa Kaeo United	30	1	4	25	24	80	−56	7	

Rules for classification: 1) points; 2) head-to-head points; 3) head-to-head goal difference; 4) head-to-head goals scored; 5) goal difference; 6) number of goals scored.
(C) Champions

== Results ==
Home \ Away	ANT	ATY	CCS	KBB	LPB	MUK	NNY	PTN	PHB	PRB	RTB	RYN	SKU	SPR	SSK	SRB
Ang Thong		0–1	1–1	1–2	0–1	1–1	1–1	0–1	1–3	2–1	0–0	0–0	4–1	0–2	1–2	1–2
Ayutthaya	3–1		2–0	1–0	0–1	0–0	5–0	0–1	2–3	0–4	0–0	1–0	5–0	1–2	1–3	0–4
Cha Choeng Sao	2–3	0–1		3–1	1–3	2–3	2–2	0–0	2–1	3–1	1–0	1–1	1–0	0–0	0–0	0–3
Kabinburi	0–3	1–1	0–1		1–5	0–3	2–3	2–1	0–2	2–2	1–2	1–3	1–0	0–2	3–3	0–3
Lopburi	2–1	1–3	2–0	5–1		1–1	4–2	0–0	4–2	0–1	3–1	1–0	4–0	0–2	1–3	3–3
Muangkan	8–1	1–2	0–0	1–1	1–1		2–0	0–0	2–1	1–0	1–0	3–1	3–0	1–2	1–1	2–4
Nakhon Nayok	0–1	0–3	0–1	3–1	3–2	1–2		0–2	0–0	0–2	1–1	1–2	1–0	1–1	0–4	0–4
Pathum Thani	0–0	1–2	1–0	5–0	0–0	1–2	1–2		2–2	1–0	2–1	2–2	2–1	2–2	1–1	1–3
Phetchaburi	2–0	2–0	3–1	4–0	1–1	2–0	3–0	0–0		1–0	1–1	0–0	1–0	0–0	1–1	0–1
Prachinburi United	1–1	1–2	5–1	2–1	1–1	0–1	2–1	2–0	4–1		2–4	0–2	5–3	1–2	2–2	2–4
Ratchaburi	3–3	0–2	1–0	6–1	1–1	2–1	2–1	0–0	1–0	3–1		0–3	4–1	2–2	0–2	1–2
Rayong	4–2	1–0	0–0	3–2	0–0	2–0	1–0	4–1	0–0	1–0	3–2		6–2	1–1	2–0	2–0
Sa Kaeo United	3–2	1–1	0–0	1–1	2–4	0–2	0–1	1–4	0–2	0–1	0–1	1–2		1–4	2–7	1–1
Samut Prakan	1–0	1–0	0–0	3–0	0–0	0–0	4–1	2–0	0–0	1–1	0–1	1–0	4–1		2–0	1–1
Samut Sakhon	2–0	0–1	3–3	1–0	0–3	0–0	2–0	2–2	2–1	2–0	2–2	2–2	2–1	0–0		1–0
Saraburi	3–2	2–2	3–1	4–0	1–2	1–1	8–0	0–1	2–0	3–0	2–3	0–0	4–1	1–1	2–1	

Updated to match(es) played on unknown. Source: Football Association of Thailand website
Legend: Blue = home team win; Yellow = draw; Red = away team win.
