= Nakhon Nayok F.C. =

Thai football club

Nakhonnayok FC นครนายก เอฟซี
- Full name: Nakhon Nayok Football Club สโมสรฟุตบอลจังหวัดนครนายก
- Nicknames: Khun Dan Warrior (นักรบขุนด่าน)
- Short name: NKNFC
- Founded: 2009; 17 years ago
- Ground: Nakhon Nayok Provincial Administrative Organization Stadium; Nakhon Nayok, Thailand
- Capacity: 2,406
- Chairman: Wutthichai Kittithanaesuan
- Manager: Pol.Cpt.Supachai Oansap
- Coach: Thongchan Seechompoophan
- League: Thailand Semi-pro League
- 2023: 6th, (Eastern Region)
Home colours	Away colours

Nakhon Nayok Football Club (Thai สโมสรฟุตบอลจังหวัดนครนายก ) is a Thai professional football club based in Nakhon Nayok province. They currently play in Thai League T4 Eastern Region.

== Stadium and locations ==
Coordinates	Location	Stadium	Capacity	Year
14°12′51″N 101°10′45″E	Nakhon Nayok	Nakhon Nayok Provincial Administrative Organization Stadium	2,406	2009–2017

== Seasons ==
Season	League									FA Cup	League Cup	Top goalscorer	
Season	Division	P	W	D	L	F	A	Pts	Pos	FA Cup	League Cup	Name	Goals
2009	Central-East	22	2	9	11	14	41	15	11th				
2010	Central-East	30	6	5	19	25	65	23	14th				
2011	Central-East	30	5	4	21	22	57	19	16th				
2012	Central-East	34	6	10	18	34	51	28	16th				
2013	Central-East	26	17	5	4	50	26	56	2nd				
2014	Central-East	26	13	10	3	50	21	49	4th				
2015	Central-East	26	6	2	18	29	58	20	13th	Not enter	QR2		
2016	East	22	10	4	8	33	22	34	5th	Not Enter	QR1		
2017	T4 East	27	6	11	10	25	46	29	7th	Not Enter	Not Enter	(France) David Le Bras	7
2018	T4 East	27	9	7	11	37	43	34	7th	Not Enter	Not Enter	(Mali) Souleymane Coulibaly (Thailand) Niphit Srithong	7
2019	Amateur League												

Champions	Runners-up	Promoted	Relegated

== Current Squads ==
Note: Flags indicate national team as defined under FIFA eligibility rules; some limited exceptions apply. Players may hold more than one non-FIFA nationality.

No.	Pos.	Nation	Player
5	DF	THA	Chaimongkol Botnok
7	FW	THA	Niphit Srithong
9	FW	CIV	Ballo Famoussa
10	FW	MLI	Souleymane Coulibaly
11	DF	THA	Chalermpol Nonpayom
12	MF	THA	Ratchata Jannongsuang
15	MF	THA	Chaiwat Weerakitpanit
26	MF	THA	Pongpat Phochai
27	FW	KOR	Jee Hyun-su
32	MF	THA	Kittitach Pranithi
33	MF	THA	Kittitat Pajantasee
39	FW	THA	Nattapon Pongkum

No.	Pos.	Nation	Player

== Honours ==
=== Domestic leagues ===
- Regional League Central-East Division
  - Runner-up (1) : 2013
