= Prachinburi United F.C. =

Thai football club

Prachinburi United ปราจีนบุรี ยูไนเต็ด
- Full name: Prachinburi United Football Club สโมสรฟุตบอลปราจีนบุรี ยูไนเต็ด
- Nickname: Hornbill
- Founded: 2010; 16 years ago
- Ground: Prachinburi Provincial Administrative Organization Stadium; Prachinburi, Thailand
- Capacity: 3,000
- Chairman: Praphan Nakphong
- Manager: มหิธร ไม่สูญผล
- League: 2018 Thailand Amateur League Eastern Region
Home colours	Away colours

Prachinburi United Football Club (Thai: สโมสรฟุตบอลปราจีนบุรี ยูไนเต็ด) is a Thai semi professional football club based in Prachinburi province. They currently play in 2018 Thailand Amateur League Eastern Region.

== Timeline ==
History of events of Prachinburi United Football Club

Year	Important events
2010	The club is formed as Prachinburi United, nicknamed The Pheasants; Club admitted to the Regional League Central & Eastern Division; Home games to be played at Prachinburi Stadium; Phitsanu Masook named as the first ever coach of Prachinburi United

== Stadium and locations ==
Coordinates	Location	Stadium	Year
14°03′53″N 101°22′30″E	Prachinburi	Prachinburi Province Stadium (Prachinburi PAO. Stadium)	2010–2015
14°01′45″N 101°31′53″E	Prachantakham	Ko Loi Stadium	2015
14°03′53″N 101°22′30″E	Prachinburi	Prachinburi Province Stadium (Prachinburi PAO. Stadium)	2015–2017

== Season by season record ==
Season	League									FA Cup	League Cup	Top goalscorer	
Season	Division	P	W	D	L	F	A	Pts	Pos	FA Cup	League Cup	Name	Goals
2010	Central-East	30	10	5	15	44	46	35	11th				
2011	Central-East	30	8	5	17	30	58	29	11th				
2012	Central-East	34	13	9	12	46	48	48	8th				
2013	Central-East	26	12	7	7	39	27	43	5th				
2014	Central-East	26	15	9	2	44	15	54	1st				
2015	Central-East	26	14	4	8	38	27	46	4th	Not enter	QR1		
2016	East	22	11	4	7	37	25	37	3rd	Not Enter	QR1		
2017	T4 East	27	2	5	20	17	55	11	10th	Not Enter	Not Enter		
2018	TA East	3	1	0	2	4	7	3	10th	Not Enter	Cannot Enter	Apinat Sripolvaree; Attawit Bupphachat	1

Champions	Runners-up	Promoted	Relegated

- P = Played
- W = Games won
- D = Games drawn
- L = Games lost
- F = Goals for
- A = Goals against
- Pts = Points
- Pos = Final position
- QR1 = First Qualifying Round
- QR2 = Second Qualifying Round
- R1 = Round 1
- R2 = Round 2
- R3 = Round 3
- R4 = Round 4
- R5 = Round 5
- R6 = Round 6
- QF = Quarter-finals
- SF = Semi-finals
- RU = Runners-up
- W = Winners

== Honours ==
- Regional League Central-East Division
  - Winners (1): 2014
