= Sakaeo F.C. =

Thai football club

Sakaeo F.C. สระแก้ว เอฟซี
- Full name: Sakaeo Football Club สโมสรฟุตบอลจังหวัดสระแก้ว
- Nickname(s): The Iron Snakebirds (นกงูเหล็ก)
- Short name: SAKFC
- Founded: 2010; 15 years ago (as Sakaeo United)
- Ground: Sa Kaeo Provincial Administrative Organization Stadium; Sakaeo, Thailand
- Capacity: 3,767
- Owner: Sakaeo F.C. Co., Ltd.
- Chairman: Songyod Thienthong
- Manager: Kitti Pak-kruek
- Coach: Christopher Ennin
- League: Thai League 3
- 2021–22: Thai League 3, 9th of 12 in the Eastern region (relegated)
| Home colours | Away colours |

Sakaeo Football Club (Thai : สโมสรฟุตบอลจังหวัดสระแก้ว) is a Thailand professional football club based in Mueang Sa Kaeo District, Sa Kaeo province. The team plays their home matches at Sa Kaeo Provincial Administrative Organization Stadium. The club is currently playing in the Thai League 3 Eastern region.

== History ==
Sakaeo United were formed by Sorawong Thienthong the Member of parliament of Sakaeo Province in 2010.

== Stadium and locations ==
| Coordinates | Location | Stadium | Year |
|---|---|---|---|
| 13°41′46″N 102°30′36″E | Aranyaprathet, Sakaeo | Aranyaprathet District Stadium | 2010 |
| 13°29′52″N 102°10′47″E | Wang Nam Yen, Sakaeo | Wangnamyen municipality Stadium | 2011–2012 |
| 13°46′22″N 102°10′41″E | Sa Kaeo | Sa Kaeo PAO. Stadium | 2013–2017 |

== Season by season record ==
| Season | League | | | | | | | | | FA Cup | League Cup | Top goalscorer | |
| Season | Division | P | W | D | L | F | A | Pts | Pos | FA Cup | League Cup | Name | Goals |
|---|---|---|---|---|---|---|---|---|---|---|---|---|---|
| 2010 | Central-East | 30 | 1 | 4 | 25 | 24 | 80 | 7 | 16th | | | | |
| 2011 | Central-East | 30 | 6 | 7 | 17 | 25 | 45 | 25 | 12th | | | | |
| 2012 | Central-East | 34 | 15 | 9 | 10 | 35 | 32 | 54 | 6th | | | | |
| 2013 | Central-East | 26 | 15 | 5 | 6 | 46 | 24 | 50 | 3rd | | | | |
| 2014 | Central-East | 26 | 13 | 9 | 4 | 55 | 35 | 45 | 5th | | | | |
| 2015 | Central-East | 26 | 8 | 9 | 9 | 33 | 36 | 33 | 7th | Not enter | R1 | | |
| 2016 | East | 22 | 11 | 2 | 9 | 35 | 26 | 35 | 4th | R1 | R1 | | |
| 2017 | T3 Upper | 26 | 9 | 7 | 10 | 35 | 37 | 34 | 8th | Not enter | QR1 | (Ghana) Isaac Oduro | 7 |
| 2018 | T3 Upper | 26 | 6 | 10 | 10 | 31 | 34 | 28 | 10th | R2 | QR1 | (Thailand) Tuangsit Soimee | 7 |
| 2019 | T3 Upper | 24 | 6 | 5 | 13 | 18 | 40 | 23 | 11th | Not enter | Not enter | (Thailand) Rawat Khamwiengchan | 4 |
| 2020–21 | T3 East | 15 | 3 | 4 | 8 | 16 | 29 | 13 | 10th | Not enter | Not enter | (Ghana) Amagwe Clement Nana | 4 |
| 2021–22 | T3 East | 22 | 4 | 5 | 13 | 18 | 35 | 17 | 9th | Not enter | Not enter | (Thailand) Wisit Chuenwanon | 6 |

| Champion | Runner | Promoted | Relegated |

== Players ==
=== Current squad ===
As of 19 September 2021

Note: Flags indicate national team as defined under FIFA eligibility rules; some limited exceptions apply. Players may hold more than one non-FIFA nationality.

| No. | Pos. | Nation | Player |
|---|---|---|---|
| 1 | GK | (Thailand) THA | Pongput Chaikeenee |
| 2 | DF | (Thailand) THA | Pipat Neewong |
| 3 | FW | (Thailand) THA | Thanawat Thipsuk |
| 4 | DF | (Thailand) THA | Surabadee Ratjarean |
| 6 | DF | (Thailand) THA | Thawatchai Buaphan |
| 7 | MF | (Thailand) THA | Jariwat Pawatpongsaphaisan |
| 8 | FW | (Thailand) THA | Setsupamin Hangsomboon |
| 9 | MF | (Thailand) THA | Sutee Khamcha |
| 10 | FW | (Thailand) THA | Prasittichai Koykong |
| 11 | MF | (Thailand) THA | Rachan Hemang |
| 13 | DF | (Thailand) THA | Surasak Ratchawong |
| 14 | FW | (Thailand) THA | Ekkarat Wongsaharach |
| 15 | MF | (Cameroon) CMR | Sandjo Kwayep Jislin Aime |
| 17 | MF | (Thailand) THA | Visit Chuenvanon |
| 19 | MF | (Thailand) THA | Siraphop Bucha |
| 21 | MF | (Thailand) THA | Noppanai Charoenrung |

| No. | Pos. | Nation | Player |
|---|---|---|---|
| 22 | DF | (Thailand) THA | Komsak Seehanat |
| 23 | FW | (Thailand) THA | Khanin Yusook |
| 24 | MF | (Thailand) THA | Wuttichai Boonterm |
| 28 | MF | (Thailand) THA | Ammarit Siriwet |
| 29 | FW | (Thailand) THA | Chainarong Yota |
| 31 | MF | (Thailand) THA | Rawat Khamwiengchan |
| 32 | GK | (Thailand) THA | Jedsada Paiklai |
| 36 | DF | (Thailand) THA | Peerapat Chanchay |
| 43 | MF | (Thailand) THA | Wittawat Tonglak |
| 44 | MF | (Thailand) THA | Surapong Maneekham |
| 54 | MF | (Thailand) THA | Phatthanaphong Lomphat |
| 66 | MF | (Thailand) THA | Kantang Klinsorn |
| 75 | MF | (Zambia) ZAM | Noah Chivuta |
| 77 | DF | (Thailand) THA | Thoranin Singniyom |
| 91 | FW | (Thailand) THA | Patinya Singkun |
| 97 | DF | (Thailand) THA | Sittikorn Kangsila |
