= TG Rayong F.C. =

Thai football club

TG Rayong F.C. ทีจี ระยอง
- Full name: TG Rayong Football Club
- Nickname: Demon
- Founded: 2013
- Ground: -, Rayong, Thailand
- League: Regional League Division 2

TG Rayong Football Club (Thai ทีจี ระยอง) is a Thai semi-professional football club based in Pluak Daeng District of Rayong Province. They currently play in Regional League Division 2 Central & Eastern. They were founded as Pluak Daeng in 2013, but changed their name to TG Rayong in 2014.

== Stadium and locations ==
Coordinates	Location	Stadium	Capacity	Year
13°05′07″N 101°09′10″E	Si Racha, Chonburi	Pattana Sport Club Stadium	?	2013
12°40′49″N 101°14′08″E	Rayong	Rayong Province Stadium	7,500	2013
12°47′46″N 101°39′29″E	Rayong	Klaeng District Stadium (Klaeng Municipality Stadium)	7,500	2014

== Season By Season Record ==
Season	League									FA Cup	League Cup	Top goalscorer	
Season	Division	P	W	D	L	F	A	Pts	Pos	FA Cup	League Cup	Name	Goals
2013	Central-East	26	1	2	23	16	94	5	14th				
2014	Central-East	26	3	5	18	31	61	11	14th		QR2		
2015	Central-East	-	-	-	-	-	-	-	Not Enter				
2016	Central-East												

Champion	Runner	Promoted	Relegated

== Honours ==
- Khǒr Royal Cup (ถ้วย ข.)
  - Winner : 2012
