= Sanong Chaiprakhom =

Thai footballer

Personal information
- Full name: Sanong Chaiprakhom
- Date of birth: June 27, 1976 (age 50)
- Place of birth: Buriram, Thailand
- Height: 1.72 m (5 ft 7 1/2 in)
- Position: Striker

Senior career*
Years	Team	Apps	(Gls)
1999–2008	Bangkok Bank	186	(70)
2009–2011	Sriracha		
2011	Chiangrai United		
- * Club domestic league appearances and goals as of 14 November 2008

Sanong Chaiprakhom (Thai: สนอง ชัยประโคม) (born 1976) is a retired professional footballer from Thailand.
