= Chaiyaphum Province Stadium =

Stadium in Chaiyaphum Province, Thailand

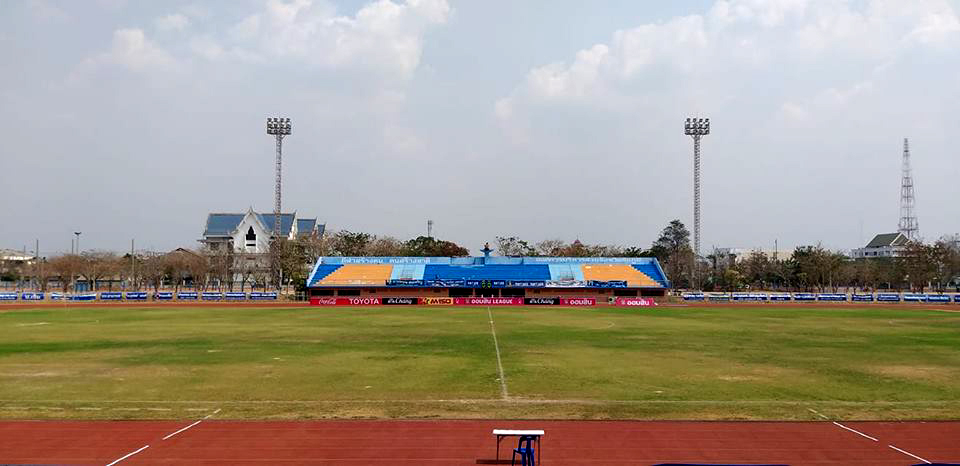
- Interactive map of Chaiyaphum Province Stadium
- Location: Chaiyaphum, Thailand
- Coordinates: 15°48′29″N 102°01′15″E
- Capacity: 2,564
- Surface: Grass

Tenant
- Mashare Chaiyaphum F.C. 2010-2011

Chaiyaphum Province Stadium (Thai: สนาม จ.ชัยภูมิ) is a multi-purpose stadium in Chaiyaphum Province, Thailand. It is currently used mostly for football matches and is the home stadium of Chaiyaphum United F.C. The stadium holds 2,564 people.
