= Pathum Thani United F.C. =

Thai football club

Pathum Thani United ปทุมธานี ยูไนเต็ด
- Full name: Pathum Thani United Football Club สโมสรฟุตบอลปทุมธานี ยูไนเต็ด
- Nicknames: Flying Dragon (มังกรเจ้าเวหา)
- Founded: 2010; 16 years ago (As Pathum Thani F.C.)
- Ground: IPE Bangkok Stadium; Pathum Thani, Thailand
- Capacity: 1,500
- Owner(s): Pathum Thaini United Co., Ltd.
- Chairman: Pongsathorn Satjachollapun
- Coach: Pongpun Boonraj
- League: 2018 Thailand Amateur League Eastern Region
| Home colours | Away colours |

Pathum Thani United Football Club (Thai สโมสรฟุตบอลจังหวัดปทุมธานี) is a Thai professional football club based in Thanyaburi, Pathum Thani province. They currently play in 2018 Thailand Amateur League Eastern Region.

== Timeline ==
History of events of Pathum Thani United Football Club

| Year | Important events |
|---|---|
| 2010 | The club is formed as Pathum Thani, nicknamed The Storks; Club admitted to the Regional League Central & Eastern Division; Home games to be played at Thammasat Stadium; Chamnan Suwannavela named as the first ever coach of Pathum Thani |

== Stadium and locations ==
| Coordinates | Location | Stadium | Year |
|---|---|---|---|
| 14°04′04″N 100°35′55″E | Rangsit, Pathumthani | Thammasat Stadium | 2010 |
| 14°01′49″N 100°43′33″E | Pathum Thani | Chaloem Phra Kiat Stadium2 (Khlong 6) | 2011 |
| 14°08′00″N 100°36′26″E | Pathum Thani | Valaya Alongkorn Rajabhat University Stadium | 2012 |
| 14°04′22″N 100°53′15″E | Pathum Thani | Institute of Physical Education Bangkok Campus Stadium | 2012–2017 |

== Season By Season record ==
| Season | League | | | | | | | | | FA Cup | League Cup | Top goalscorer | |
| Season | Division | P | W | D | L | F | A | Pts | Pos | FA Cup | League Cup | Name | Goals |
|---|---|---|---|---|---|---|---|---|---|---|---|---|---|
| 2010 | Central-East | 30 | 10 | 12 | 8 | 35 | 31 | 42 | 10th | | | | |
| 2011 | Central-East | 30 | 5 | 8 | 17 | 34 | 59 | 23 | 14th | | | | |
| 2012 | Central-East | 34 | 6 | 9 | 19 | 25 | 43 | 27 | 17th | | | | |
| 2013 | Central-East | 26 | 10 | 9 | 7 | 27 | 22 | 39 | 6th | | | | |
| 2014 | Central-East | 26 | 6 | 10 | 9 | 31 | 40 | 28 | 10th | | | | |
| 2015 | Central-East | 26 | 7 | 8 | 11 | 33 | 38 | 29 | 10th | Not Enter | QR2 | | |
| 2016 | Bangkok-East | 18 | 4 | 5 | 9 | 22 | 35 | 17 | 8th | R1 | 1st Qualification | | |
| 2017 | T4 West | 27 | 1 | 1 | 25 | 17 | 74 | 4 | 10th | Not Enter | Not Enter | Panuspong Thuengsaeng | 5 |
| 2018 | TA East | 1 | 0 | 0 | 1 | 0 | 4 | 0 | 29th | Not Enter | Cannot Enter | none | 0 |

| Champion | Runner | Promoted | Relegated |
