= Victor Amaro =

Brazilian footballer

Personal information
- Full name: Victor Gonçalves Amaro
- Date of birth: 31 January 1987 (age 39)
- Place of birth: Brazil
- Height: 1.82 m (6 ft 0 in)
- Position: Midfielder

Team information
- Current team: Police Tero (assistant)

Senior career*
Years	Team	Apps	(Gls)
2009	Madureira	0	(0)
2010–2011	Sisaket	0	(0)
2012–2013	Samut Songkhram	26	(0)
2014–2016	Sisaket	79	(3)
2017	Nongbua Pitchaya	17	(2)
2018	Krabi	25	(1)
2019	Lao Toyota	0	(0)
2020–2021	Trang	12	(1)
2021	Muang Loei United	0	(0)
2021–2022	Bankhai United	21	(4)
Total		180	(11)

Managerial career
- 2022–2023: Thawi Watthana Samut Sakhon United (assistant)
- 2023–2026: Chanthaburi (assistant)
- 2025: Chanthaburi (caretaker)
- 2026–: Police Tero (assistant)
- * Club domestic league appearances and goals

Victor Gonçalves Amaro (born 31 January 1987) is a Brazilian former professional footballer who played as a midfielder in Brazil, Laos and Thailand. In 2024–25 he works as assistant coach of Thai League 2 club Police Tero.
