= Rajpracha Sport Resort =

Stadium in Thailand

- Interactive map of Rajpracha Sport Resort
- Location: Nakhon Ratchasima, Thailand
- Coordinates: 14°41′14″N 101°24′42″E
- Owner: Rajpracha Foundation
- Operator: Rajpracha Foundation
- Capacity: 3,000
- Surface: Grass

Rajpracha Sport Resort (Thai: สนามราชประชาสปอร์ตรีสอร์ต, romanized: Rajpracha Sport Resort) is a multi-purpose stadium in Nakhon Ratchasima Province, Thailand. It is currently used mostly for football matches. The stadium holds 3,000 people.
