= Angthong F.C. =

Thai football club

Angthong อ่างทอง เอฟซี
- Full name: Angthong Football Club สโมสรฟุตบอลจังหวัดอ่างทอง
- Nicknames: The Golden Rice Warriors (นักรบรวงทอง)
- Short name: ATFC
- Founded: 2010; 16 years ago
- Ground: Ang Thong Province Stadium; Ang Thong
- Capacity: 10,000
- Owner(s): Angthong F.C. Co., Ltd.
- Chairman: Somsak Pitsananantakul
- Head coach: Warit Boonsripitayanon
- League: Thai League 3
- 2025–26: Thai League 3, 5th of 11 in the Central region
Home colours	Away colours

Angthong Football Club (Thai: สโมสรฟุตบอลจังหวัดอ่างทอง) is a Thai professional football club based in Ang Thong Province. The club is currently playing in the Thai League 3 Western region.

== History ==
Angthong were founded in 2010 and finished 13th out of 16 teams in their first season in the Central and Eastern League.

On Sunday, 15 September 2013, Angthong were crowned champions of the Central & Western division following a 3–2 win away at Huahin.

In 2022, Angthong competed in the Thai League 3 for the 2022–23 season. It is their 13th season in the professional league. The club started the season with a 0–2 away defeat to Assumption United and they ended the season with a 2–1 home win over Assumption United. The club has finished 6th place in the league of the Western region.

== Stadium and locations ==
Coordinates	Location	Stadium	Capacity	Year
14°37′45″N 100°27′06″E	Angthong	Ang Thong Province Stadium	5,500	2010–2017

== Records ==
Season	League									FA Cup	League Cup	T3 Cup	Top scorer	
Season	Division	P	W	D	L	F	A	Pts	Pos	FA Cup	League Cup	T3 Cup	Name	Goals
2010	DIV 2 Central&East	30	5	8	17	33	53	23	13th	R2	R1			
2011	DIV 2 Central&East	30	13	12	5	52	31	51	5th	R1	R1			
2012	DIV 2 Central&East	34	21	7	6	72	28	70	4th	QR	QR2			
2013	DIV 2 Central&West	24	15	3	6	44	22	48	1st	R2	QR1			
2014	DIV 1	34	11	15	8	48	35	48	8th	R3	R2		(Slovakia) Viliam Macko	7
2015	DIV 1	38	12	15	11	48	41	51	10th	R2	R2		(Brazil) Alex Ruela	13
2016	DIV 1	26	11	8	7	38	30	41	5th	R1	R1		(Ivory Coast) Marc Landry Babo	13
2017	T2	32	15	8	9	65	46	53	4th	Opted out	Opted out		(Ivory Coast) Bernard Doumbia	16
2018	T2	28	5	9	14	39	52	24	15th	Opted out	Opted out		(Ghana) Isaac Honny	17
2019	T3 Upper	24	11	5	8	37	29	38	4th	Opted out	Opted out		(Brazil) Moacir da Rosa Wilmsen	10
2020–21	T3 West	17	12	2	3	36	10	38	3rd	Opted out	Opted out		(Thailand) Sirichai Lamphuttha	10
2021–22	T3 West	20	7	6	7	29	22	27	6th	Opted out	Opted out		(Thailand) Sirichai Lamphuttha	10
2022–23	T3 West	22	9	4	9	35	30	31	6th	Opted out	Opted out		(Thailand) Chitsanupong Minphimai, (Ghana) Eric Kumi	6
2023–24	T3 West	20	12	4	4	42	20	40	2nd	Opted out	Opted out	QR2	(England) Karam Idris	12
2024–25	T3 Central	20	3	10	7	16	26	19	9th	Opted out	Opted out	LP	(England) Karam Idris, (Thailand) Suphawit Chusaksakunviboon, (Thailand) Wipoo Kachawong	3
2025–26	T3 Central	20	10	4	6	31	21	34	5th	Opted out	Opted out	LP	(Thailand) Patiphan Panneangpech	9

Champions	Runners-up	Promoted	Relegated

== Honours ==
=== Domestic leagues ===
- Regional League Central-West Division
  - Champions (1): 2013

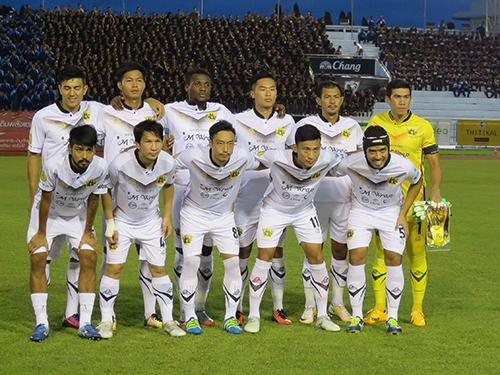
Angthong in 2017

== Players ==
Note: Flags indicate national team as defined under FIFA eligibility rules; some limited exceptions apply. Players may hold more than one non-FIFA nationality.

No.	Pos.	Nation	Player
2	DF	THA	Watcharaphon Srinin
3	DF	THA	Tuanmuhammadfaisam Niloh
4	MF	THA	Sarawut Munjit
6	MF	THA	Kapitcha Chanakaree
8	MF	THA	Worawoot Saengsawang
10	MF	THA	Patiphan Panneangpech
11	FW	BRA	Célio Guilherme da Silva Santos
13	MF	THA	Wipoo Kachawong
14	MF	THA	Nuttapol Srisamutr
15	GK	THA	Panchawit Sawangsri
18	GK	THA	Thitiphong Krathon
19	MF	THA	Chitsanupong Minphimai

No.	Pos.	Nation	Player
21	MF	THA	Suphawit Chusaksakujnviboon
23	MF	THA	Chanayut Jejue
25	DF	THA	Wuttinan Saensupa
30	MF	THA	Kamol Phothong (Captain)
31	GK	THA	Thanatorn Kuchana
33	DF	BRA	Marciano de Oliveira Filho Odair
40	DF	THA	Thiraphat Khwanrot
47	DF	THA	Ratipong Pangkhabut
50	DF	THA	Kritsana Daokrajai
91	MF	SRB	Marko Milenkovic
98	MF	THA	Sarawurt Kamchonkiadtikun
