= Rayong F.C. =

Thai association football club

Rayong ระยอง เอฟซี
- Full name: Rayong Football Club สโมสรฟุตบอลจังหวัดระยอง
- Nicknames: The Dragon Horses (ม้านิลมังกร)
- Short name: RYG
- Founded: 2009; 17 years ago
- Ground: Rayong Province Stadium; Rayong, Thailand
- Capacity: 7,500
- Chairman: Sathit Pitutecha
- Head coach: Aktaporn Chalitaporn
- League: Thai League 1
- 2025–26: Thai League 1, 9th of 16
- Website: www.rayongfc.org
Home colours	Away colours	Third colours

Rayong Football Club (Thai: สโมสรฟุตบอลจังหวัดระยอง) is a Thai professional football club based in Rayong province currently playing in the Thai League 1, the highest-level league in Thailand. The club is managed by the Rayong Provincial Administrative Organization.

== History ==
=== Early years ===
Rayong Football Club was established to represent Rayong Province in Thailand’s professional football league system. In its early years, the club competed in the lower divisions, focusing on building a competitive squad and developing local talent from the Eastern Region.

=== League progression ===
Rayong gradually progressed through the Thai league system, earning promotions as the club strengthened its organisational structure and on-field performances. The club experienced periods of promotion and relegation, reflecting the competitive nature of Thai football and Rayong’s ongoing efforts to establish long-term stability at higher levels.

=== Recent seasons ===
In recent seasons, Rayong have continued to compete in Thailand’s professional leagues, balancing ambitions of promotion with squad development and financial sustainability. The club remains an important representative of Rayong Province, with a focus on nurturing domestic players and maintaining a strong local identity.

In the 2019 season, Rayong finished the season in third place with 61 points thus gaining promotion to the Thai League 1 in the 2020 season. This was the club's first ever top flight league campaign in its history. However, Rayong didn't perform well in its debut top flight season, thus finishing last in the 2020 season with 15 points, and being relegated back to Thai League 2.

In the 2023–24 season, Rayong finished the season in third place with 60 points, qualifying for the promotion play-offs. In the semi-finals, the club faced off against Ayutthaya United where Rayong won 5–3 on aggregate to advance to the final round. Rayong then went on to draw 1–1 on aggregate with Nakhon Si United in the final round but gained promotion to the Thai League 1 on away goal rules.

== Stadium ==
Coordinates	Location	Stadium	Capacity	Year
12°40′49″N 101°14′08″E	Rayong	Rayong Province Stadium	7,500	2009–present

== Season by season record ==
Season	League									FA Cup	League Cup	Top goalscorer	
Season	Division	P	W	D	L	F	A	Pts	Pos	FA Cup	League Cup	Name	Goals
2009	DIV 2 Central-East	22	5	9	8	18	20	24	8th	R2			
2010	DIV 2 Central-East	30	16	10	4	48	24	58	3rd				
2011	DIV 2 Central-East	30	20	6	4	68	22	66	2nd				
2012	DIV 2 Central-East	34	24	7	3	72	30	79	2nd				
2013	DIV 1	34	8	12	14	48	62	36	17th	R3	SF		
2014	DIV 2 Central-East	26	16	4	6	59	26	49	3rd				
2015	DIV 2 Central-East	26	19	5	2	50	17	62	1st	R2	R1		
2016	DIV 1	26	4	12	10	24	39	24	13th	R3	R1	(Thailand) Sirisak Fufung	6
2017	T2	32	10	8	14	55	56	38	11th	R3	R2	(Brazil) Harrison	14
2018	T2	28	8	9	11	32	35	33	11th	R1	R1	Seiya Sugishita	8
2019	T2	34	18	7	9	70	59	61	3rd	R3	R1	(Brazil) Tiago Chulapa	19
2020–21	T1	30	4	3	23	24	69	15	16th	R2	Canceled	(Japan) Goshi Okubo (Brazil) Adalgisio Pitbull	5
2021–22	T2	34	13	7	14	45	41	46	9th	R1	R1	(Brazil) David Cuerva	11
2022–23	T2	34	14	10	10	41	10	52	7th	QR	R1	(Brazil) Tiago Chulapa	12
2023–24	T2	34	16	12	6	62	34	60	3rd	R2	QR	(Brazil) Tiago Chulapa	22
2024–25	T1	30	8	8	14	41	59	32	12th	R2	R2	(Brazil) Stênio Júnior	10
2025–26	T1	30	9	10	11	44	49	37	9th	R2	R1	(Brazil) Stênio Júnior	14

Champions	Runners-up	Third Place	Promoted	Relegated

- P = Played
- W = Games won
- D = Games drawn
- L = Games lost
- F = Goals for
- A = Goals against
- Pts = Points
- Pos = Final position
- TPL = Thai Premier League
- QR1 = First Qualifying Round
- QR2 = Second Qualifying Round
- QR3 = Third Qualifying Round
- QR4 = Fourth Qualifying Round
- RInt = Intermediate Round
- R1 = Round 1
- R2 = Round 2
- R3 = Round 3
- R4 = Round 4
- R5 = Round 5
- R6 = Round 6
- GR = Group Stage
- QF = Quarter-finals
- SF = Semi-finals
- RU = Runners-up
- S = Shared
- W = Winners

== Players ==
=== Current squad ===
Note: Flags indicate national team as defined under FIFA eligibility rules; some limited exceptions apply. Players may hold more than one non-FIFA nationality.

No.	Pos.	Nation	Player
2	DF	THA	Noppon Kerdkaew
3	DF	THA	Thanawat Pimyotha
4	DF	JPN	Hiromichi Katano
5	DF	THA	Pharadon Phatthapon
6	MF	BRA	João Afonso
7	FW	THA	Mehti Sarakham
8	MF	THA	Natcha Promsomboon
10	MF	BRA	Joao Coutinho
11	FW	THA	Peerapat Kaminthong
15	DF	THA	Thanaset Sujarit
17	MF	BRA	Bruno Leite
18	MF	THA	Parndecha Ngernprasert
19	DF	THA	Supawit Romphopak
22	FW	THA	Verot Pombuppha
26	FW	BRA	Renan Gorne

No.	Pos.	Nation	Player
27	MF	THA	Anon Amornlerdsak (on loan from Bangkok United)
30	GK	THA	Wichaya Gantong
31	GK	THA	Phatcharaphong Prathumma
35	DF	THA	Kritsada Nontharat (on loan from Bangkok United)
36	GK	THA	Worawut Srisupha
37	DF	BRA	Mayron Marques
50	GK	THA	Ketanuson Junrung
54	GK	THA	Marvin Leelard
66	MF	THA	Nonthawat Bathong
74	MF	THA	Porrameth Ittiprasert
77	MF	KOR	Yeo Hong-gyu
79	MF	THA	Patipanchai Phothep
80	MF	THA	Wattanapong Withunat
94	DF	BRA	Antonio Abreu Lara
98	FW	BRA	Joao Felipe
99	FW	ROU	Cristian Măgerușan

=== Out on loan ===
Note: Flags indicate national team as defined under FIFA eligibility rules; some limited exceptions apply. Players may hold more than one non-FIFA nationality.

No.	Pos.	Nation	Player
27	MF	THA	Anon Amornlerdsak (at (Thailand) Bangkok United)
35	DF	THA	Kritsada Nontharat (at (Thailand) Bangkok United)

== Honours ==
- Regional League Central-East Division
  - Champions (1): 2015
