= Wangnamyen municipality Stadium =

- Interactive map of Wangnamyen municipality Stadium
- Location: Wang Nam Yen, Sa Kaeo, Thailand
- Coordinates: 13°29′52″N 102°10′47″E
- Capacity: ?
- Surface: Grass

Tenant
- Sa Kaeo F.C. 2009-2012

Wangnamyen municipality Stadium (Thai: สนามเทศบาลเมืองวังน้ำเย็น, สนามโรงเรียนมิตรสัมพันธ์วิทยา) is a multi-purpose stadium in Wang Nam Yen District, Sa Kaeo Province, Thailand. It is currently used mostly for football matches and is the home stadium of Sa Kaeo F.C.
