= Bang Pa-in Ayutthaya F.C. =

Thailand football club

Bang Pa-in Ayutthaya บางปะอิน อยุธยา
- Full name: Bang Pa-in Ayutthaya Football Club สโมสรฟุตบอล บางปะอิน อยุธยา
- Nicknames: The Blue Warriors (นักรบสีน้ำเงิน)
- Short name: BPAYTFC
- Founded: 2009; 17 years ago, as Ayutthaya; 2020; 6 years ago, as Bang Pa-in Ayutthaya
- Ground: Bang Pa-in District Stadium; Bang Pa-in, Phra Nakhon Si Ayutthaya Province, Thailand
- Capacity: 1,800
- Chairman: Arthit Pak-insee
- Manager: Yutthana Konthong
- Coach: Nattaporn Phanrit
- League: Thailand Amateur League
- 2021–22: Thai League 3, 11th of 11 in the Western region (relegated)
Home colours	Away colours

Bang Pa-in Ayutthaya Football Club (Thai: สโมสรฟุตบอล บางปะอิน อยุธยา) is a Thai professional Association football club based in Bang Pa-in, Phra Nakhon Si Ayutthaya Province. The club is currently playing in the Thailand Amateur League Western region.

== Timeline ==
History of events of Ayutthaya Football Club:

Year	Important events
2009	The club is formed as Ayutthaya Football Club, nicknamed The Ancient Warriors; Club admitted to the Regional League Central/East Division; Home games to be played at Ayutthaya Stadium; Yutthana Konthong named as the first ever coach of Ayutthaya; The club finish second in their first ever season in the Regional League Central/East Division; Make fourth round of the FA Cup, playing under the name KrungKao SA

=== Crest history ===
The club was renamed to Bang Pa-in Ayutthaya and add the texts Bang Pa-in in 2020.

2009–2019

2020–Present

== Honours ==
- Regional League Division 2:

Winner: (2012)

- Regional League Central-East Division:

Winner: (2012)
Runner up: (2009)

== Stadium and locations ==
Coordinates	Location	Stadium	Capacity	Year
14°21′00″N 100°35′50″E	Ayutthaya	Ayutthaya Province Stadium	6,000	2009–2015
14°22′35″N 100°36′22″E	Ayutthaya	Rajamangala University of Technology Hantra Campus Stadium	3,000	2016
14°16′37″N 100°34′20″E	Bang Pa-in, Ayutthaya	Bang Pa-in District Stadium	1,800	2017

== Seasons ==
Season	League									FA Cup	League Cup	Top scorer	
Season	Division	P	W	D	L	F	A	Pts	Pos	FA Cup	League Cup	Name	Goals
2009	DIV 2 Central-East	22	12	8	2	40	21	44	2nd	R4	—		
2010	DIV 2 Central-East	30	15	5	10	42	21	50	6th	R1	Not enter		
2011	DIV 2 Central-East	30	14	10	6	60	34	52	4th	R1	R1		
2012	DIV 2 Central-East	34	25	8	1	72	26	83	1st	QF	QR2		
2013	DIV 1	34	11	11	12	40	41	44	8th	R2	R1	(Nigeria) Adefolarin Durosinmi	8
2014	DIV 1	34	15	6	13	54	50	51	6th	R3	R2	(Cameroon) Berlin Ndebe-Nlome	13
2015	DIV 1	38	12	7	19	47	71	43	17th	R1	R3	(Brazil) Valci Júnior	24
2016	DIV 2 Central	20	13	3	4	27	11	42	2nd	Not enter	Not enter	(South Korea) Kim Myung-gyu	5
2017	T3 Upper	26	16	4	6	43	25	52	3rd	Not enter	Not enter	(South Korea) Kim Ji-hun	19
2018	T3 Upper	26	8	7	11	26	32	31	7th	Not enter	Not enter	(Thailand) Charin Boodhad	6
2019	T3 Upper	24	6	4	14	20	31	22	12th	Not enter	Not enter	(Cameroon) Mohamadou Ousmanou	4
2020–21	T3 West	16	7	2	7	21	17	23	5th	Not enter	Not enter	(Thailand) Kueanun Junumpai	6
2021–22	T3 West	20	5	3	12	17	31	18	11th	QR	QR2	(Thailand) Anon Pumsiri	4

Champions	Runners-up	Third place	Promoted	Relegated

- P = Played
- W = Games won
- D = Games drawn
- L = Games lost
- F = Goals for
- A = Goals against
- Pts = Points
- Pos = Final position
- TPL = Thai Premier League
- QR1 = First qualifying round
- QR2 = Second qualifying round
- QR3 = Third qualifying round
- QR4 = Fourth qualifying round
- RInt = Intermediate round
- R1 = Round 1
- R2 = Round 2
- R3 = Round 3
- R4 = Round 4
- R5 = Round 5
- R6 = Round 6
- GR = Group stage
- QF = Quarter-finals
- SF = Semi-finals
- RU = Runners-up
- S = Shared
- W = Winners

== Players ==
=== Current squad ===
As of 19 September 2021

Note: Flags indicate national team as defined under FIFA eligibility rules; some limited exceptions apply. Players may hold more than one non-FIFA nationality.

No.	Pos.	Nation	Player
1	GK	THA	Khanaphod Kadee
3	MF	THA	Thatthai Preechawong
4	DF	THA	Prachya Fudsuparp
5	MF	THA	Wethit Suephem
6	MF	THA	Cholnakorn Chanjamsai
7	FW	THA	Manop Kittiphirun
8	MF	THA	Anantayod Intharakamnoed
9	FW	THA	Nattanan Kantham
10	MF	THA	Naravit Kaosantia
11	FW	THA	Arnon Pumsiri
14	MF	THA	Suriya Pongprung
16	DF	THA	Teerawat Banchamek
17	DF	THA	Nathaphol Srisawat
18	MF	THA	Theerapat Kaewphung
19	FW	THA	Kueanun Junumpai
20	MF	BRA	Breno Souza Dias

No.	Pos.	Nation	Player
21	FW	THA	Thodsawat Aunkongrat
22	GK	THA	Sarawut Nilthanom
23	DF	THA	Sutthikan Homkajorn
25	DF	THA	Chanon Lekmuenwai
26	MF	THA	Khemtit Phetcharat
27	DF	THA	Prathomporn Phetcharat
28	MF	THA	Pongpon Nontanum
29	MF	THA	Niphitphon Saengsuk
31	MF	THA	Disadorn Phanchan
34	MF	THA	Weerasak Srived
35	GK	THA	Phureephat Pongsatorntheer
37	DF	THA	Kittiphop Taewsawaeng
38	MF	THA	Phuttipong Silatham
39	GK	THA	Atithuch Chankar
41	MF	THA	Wuttichai Bunraksa
66	DF	THA	Jakkarin Buarakhon
77	MF	THA	Sarawut Atthasit
