= Nakhon Nayok Provincial Administrative Organization Stadium =

Coordinates: 14.214102°N 101.179114°E

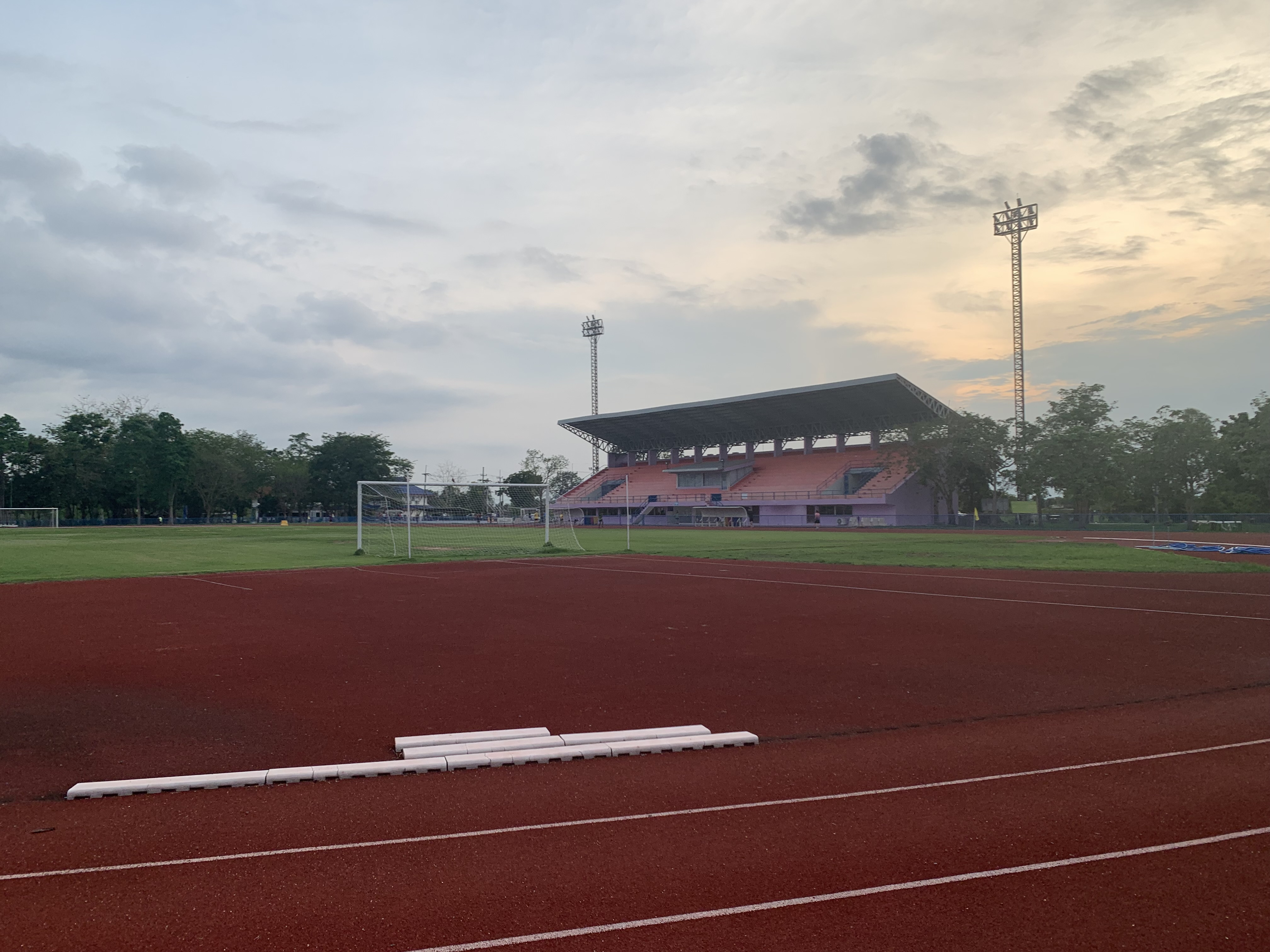
- Interactive map of Nakhon Nayok Provincial Administrative Organization Stadium
- Location: Nakhon Nayok, Thailand
- Owner: Nakhon Nayok Provincial Administrative Organization
- Operator: Nakhon Nayok Provincial Administrative Organization
- Capacity: 2,406
- Surface: Grass

Tenant
- Nakhon Nayok F.C. 2010-

Nakhon Nayok Provincial Administrative Organization Stadium or Nakhon Nayok Province Stadium (Thai: สนาม อบจ.นครนายก หรือ สนามกีฬาจังหวัดนครนายก) is a multi-purpose stadium in Nakhon Nayok Province, Thailand. It is currently used mostly for football matches and is the home stadium of Nakhon Nayok F.C. The stadium holds 2,406 people.
