= 2016 Regional League Division 2 Eastern Region =

- Season: 2016
- Champions: Trat
- Matches: 132
- Goals: 360 (2.73 per match)
- Top goalscorer: Sarawut Choenchai (15 Goals)
- Biggest home win: Sa Kaeo 10–0 TA Benchamarachuthit (8 May 2016)
- Biggest away win: TA Benchamarachuthit 0–5 Pattaya City (19 March 2016)
- Highest scoring: Sa Kaeo 10–0 TA Benchamarachuthit (8 May 2016)
- Longest winning run: 5 Matches; Trat
- Longest unbeaten run: 18 Matches; Trat
- Longest losing run: 6 Matches; TA Benchamarachuthit
- Highest attendance: 2,206; Cha Choeng Sao 0–1 Sa Kaeo (1 May 2016)
- Lowest attendance: 32; Pattaya City 0–1 Nakhon Nayok (22 May 2016)

2016 Regional League Division 2 Eastern Region is the 8th season of the League competition since its establishment in 2009. It is in the third tier of the Thai football league system.

== Changes from last season ==
=== Break zone clubs ===
Nakhon Nayok, Prachinburi United, Kabin United, Sa Kaeo, Marines Maptaphut, Chanthaburi and Samut Prakan Songsingh are broken from Central & Eastern Region

=== Team changes ===
==== Promoted clubs ====
Rayong were promoted to the 2016 Thai Division 1 League.

==== Relegated clubs ====
- Trat were relegated from the 2015 Thai Division 1 League.

==== Renamed clubs ====
- Tawee Wattana renamed Pattaya City.
- Kabin United renamed Saimitr Kabin United.
- Marines Maptaphut renamed Marines Eureka.
- Rayong United renamed Pluak Daeng Rayong United.

=== Relocated clubs ===
- Rayong United re-located to the Regional League East Division from the Bangkok Area Division 2015.
- Pathum Thani United, Royal Thai Fleet were moved to the Bangkok & Eastern Region.
- Phan Thong, Saraburi TRU were moved to the Central Region.

=== Expansion clubs ===
TA Benchamarachuthit joined the newly expanded league setup.

== Stadium and locations ==
Locations of the 2016 Regional League Division 2 Eastern Region Teams

Team	Location	Stadium	Capacity	Ref.
Cha Choeng Sao	Chachoengsao	Chachoengsao Town municipality Stadium	6,000	
Chanthaburi	Chanthaburi	Chanthaburi Province Stadium	4,800	
Saimitr Kabin United	Prachinburi	Nom Klao Maharaj Stadium	3,000	
Marines Eureka	Rayong	Klaeng Municipality Stadium	?	
Nakhon Nayok	Nakhon Nayok	Nakhon Nayok Provincial Administrative Organization Stadium	2,406	
Prachinburi United	Prachinburi	Prachinburi Provincial Administrative Organization Stadium	3,000	
Pattaya City	Pattaya, Chonburi	Nong Prue 1 Stadium Nong Prue 2 Stadium; Planet Football Stadium	6,000 ? ?	
Pluak Daeng Rayong United	Rayong	Rayong Province Central Stadium	4,512	
Sa Kaeo	Sa Kaeo	Sa Kaeo Provincial Administrative Organization Stadium	?	
Samut Prakan	Samut Prakan	Samut Prakarn SAT Stadium (Keha Bang Phli)	4,100	
TA Benchamarachuthit	Chanthaburi	Rambhai Barni Rajabhat University Stadium	2,000	
Trat	Trat	Trat Province Stadium	5,000	

Football clubs in Bangkok Metropolitan Region

== League table ==
Pos	Team	Pld	W	D	L	GF	GA	GD	Pts	Promotion or relegation
1	Trat (C, Q)	22	16	4	2	45	19	+26	52	Qualification to Champions League Round and Promotion to Thai League Championship
2	Cha Choeng Sao (Q)	22	11	7	4	46	22	+24	40	Qualification to Champions League Round and Promotion to Thai League Championship
3	Prachinburi United (P)	22	11	4	7	37	25	+12	37	Promotion to Thai League Championship
4	Sa Kaeo (P)	22	11	2	9	35	26	+9	35	Promotion to Thai League Championship
5	Nakhon Nayok	22	10	4	8	33	22	+11	34	
6	Rayong United	22	9	6	7	30	19	+11	33	
7	Samut Prakan	22	8	5	9	28	28	0	29	
8	Pattaya City	22	7	5	10	35	36	−1	26 (Note: PAT 2 1 1 ; MAP 2 0 2 ; CHA 1 1 2)	
9	Marines Eureka	22	7	5	10	22	28	−6	26	
10	Chanthaburi	22	6	8	8	21	22	−1	26	
11	Kabin United	22	6	5	11	20	34	−14	23	
12	TA Benchamarachuthit (R)	22	0	5	17	8	79	−71	5	Relegation to Thai Football Division 3

Source: Division 2
Rules for classification: 1) points; 2) head-to-head points; 3) head-to-head goal difference; 4) head-to-head goals scored; 5) goal difference; 6) number of goals scored.
(C) Champions; (P) Promoted; (Q) Qualified for the phase indicated; (R) Relegated

== Results ==
Home \ Away	CCS	CHA	KAB	MAP	NAK	PAT	PRA	RAU	SK	SAP	TAB	TRA
Cha Choeng Sao		1–1	6–0	1–0	1–0	7–1	2–1	1–0	0–1	2–1	4–0	3–3
Chanthaburi	1–1		2–0	1–0	1–1	1–2	3–0	0–2	1–0	0–1	3–1	2–2
Kabin United	1–1	0–0		0–0	0–0	2–1	2–3	1–0	2–1	1–2	4–0	0–3
Marines Eureka	1–1	1–0	1–0		2–1	3–0	1–4	0–3	0–2	2–1	2–0	1–1
Nakhon Nayok	3–2	2–0	2–3	2–1		4–2	1–2	0–0	0–1	2–1	7–0	2–0
Pattaya City	2–5	1–1	2–0	3–0	0–1		0–0	3–0	1–1	1–2	4–0	1–2
Prachinburi United	2–1	0–1	3–2	0–0	0–0	0–0		2–3	2–0	4–1	7–0	0–1
Rayong United	2–2	1–1	0–1	2–1	0–1	2–1	0–1		2–1	1–1	7–0	0–1
Sa Kaeo	0–1	2–1	2–0	1–3	1–0	1–2	3–1	0–0		1–0	10–0	2–4
Samut Prakan	1–1	2–0	3–0	1–0	2–0	3–2	2–3	1–1	1–2		1–1	1–2
TA Benchamarachuthit	0–3	1–1	1–1	2–2	1–3	0–5	0–1	0–2	1–2	0–0		0–2
Trat	1–0	1–0	1–0	2–1	2–1	1–1	2–1	0–2	4–1	2–0	8–0	

Updated to match(es) played on 4 September 2016. Source: Division 2
Legend: Blue = home team win; Yellow = draw; Red = away team win.

== Season statistics ==
=== Top scorers ===
As of 4 September 2016.

Rank	Player	Club	Goals
1	(Thailand) Sarawut Choenchai	Cha Choeng Sao	15
2	(Brazil) Erivaldo Oliveira	Trat	11
3	(Japan) Soma Otani	Pattaya City	10
3	(Thailand) Jirawut Saranan	Trat	10
5	(Thailand) Kritsada Naknoun	Prachinburi United	9
5	(Thailand) Jaruwat Nammool	Prachinburi United	9
7	(Thailand) Wuttichai Asusheewa	Trat	8
7	(Thailand) Pratya Narach	Rayong United	8
7	(Thailand) Watthana Suknarm	Pattaya City	8
10	(Japan) Yu Kuboki	Cha Choeng Sao	7
10	(South Korea) Cho Byung-jun	Chanthaburi	7

== See also ==
- 2016 Thai Premier League
- 2016 Thai Division 1 League
- 2016 Regional League Division 2
- 2016 Thai FA Cup
- 2016 Thai League Cup
- 2016 Kor Royal Cup
