= 2017 Thai League 4 Eastern Region =

- Season: 2017
- Champions: Chanthaburi
- Relegated: Prachinburi United
- Matches: 135
- Goals: 352 (2.61 per match)
- Top goalscorer: Dawda Dibba (20 Goals)
- Biggest home win: Chanthaburi 6–0 Prachinburi United (26 August 2017); Chonburi B 6–0 Nakhon Nayok (27 August 2017)
- Biggest away win: Pattaya 2–6 Chonburi B (30 April 2017)
- Highest scoring: Pattaya 2–6 Chonburi B (30 April 2017)
- Longest winning run: 5 matches Chonburi B
- Longest unbeaten run: 10 matches Chanthaburi; Marines Eureka; Royal Thai Fleet
- Longest losing run: 7 matches Prachinburi United
- Highest attendance: 825; Chanthaburi 2–1 Kabin United (18 March 2017)
- Lowest attendance: 24; Royal Thai Fleet 2–1 Pattaya (20 August 2017)
- Total attendance: 37,451
- Average attendance: 288

2017 Thai League 4 Eastern Region is the 8th season of the League competition since its establishment in 2009. It is in the fourth tier of the Thai football league system.

== Changes from last season ==
=== Team changes ===
==== Promoted clubs ====
Promoted to the 2017 Thai League 2

- Trat

Two club was promoted to the 2017 Thai League 3 Upper Region.

- Cha Choeng Sao
- Sa Kaeo

Promoted from the 2016 Thai Division 3 Tournament Eastern Region

- Bankhai United

==== Relegated clubs ====
- TA Benchamarachuthit were relegated to the 2016 Thai Division 3 Tournament Eastern Region.

=== Relocated clubs ===
- Pattaya and Royal Thai Fleet were moved from the Bangkok & Eastern Region 2016.
- Samut Prakan were moved to the 2017 Thai League 4 Bangkok & field Region
- Pattaya City were moved to the 2017 Thai League 4 North Eastern Region

=== Expansion clubs ===
- Prachinburi United was promoted to the 2017 Thai League 3 but this Club-licensing football club didn't pass to play 2017 Thai League 3. This team is relegated to 2017 Thai League 4 Eastern Region again.

=== Reserving clubs ===
- Chonburi B is Chonburi Reserving this team which join Northern Region first time.

== Stadium and locations ==
Locations of the 2017 Thai League 4 Eastern Region Teams

Team	Location	Stadium	Ref.
Bankhai United	Rayong	Wai Krong Stadium	
Chanthaburi	Chanthaburi	Chanthaburi PAO. Stadium	
Chonburi B	Chonburi	Chonburi Stadium	
Kabin United	Prachinburi	Nom Klao Maharaj Stadium	
Marines Eureka	Rayong	Klaeng Municipality Stadium	
Nakhon Nayok	Nakhon Nayok	Nakhon Nayok PAO. Stadium	
Pattaya	Chonburi	Nong Prue 1 Stadium	
Prachinburi United	Prachinburi	Prachinburi PAO. Stadium	
Pluak Daeng Rayong United	Rayong	Rayong Province Central Stadium	
Royal Thai Fleet	Chonburi	Sattahip Navy Stadium	

== League table ==
Pos	Team	Pld	W	D	L	GF	GA	GD	Pts	Qualification or relegation
1	Chanthaburi (C, Q)	27	14	9	4	40	23	+17	51	Qualification to the Thai League 4 Champions League
2	Marines Eureka (Q, P)	27	13	9	5	42	28	+14	48	Qualification to the Thai League 4 Champions League
3	Pluakdaeng Rayong United	27	12	10	5	36	23	+13	46	
4	Royal Thai Fleet	27	10	13	4	39	25	+14	43	
5	Chonburi B	27	11	9	7	46	34	+12	42	
6	Bankhai United	27	9	8	10	45	42	+3	35	
7	Nakhon Nayok	27	6	11	10	25	46	−21	29	
8	Pattaya	27	7	7	13	38	41	−3	28 (Note: Pattaya ahead on head-to-head record; Pattaya 7 pts, Kabin United 1 pt.)	
9	Kabin United	27	7	7	13	25	36	−11	28	
10	Prachinburi United (R)	27	2	5	20	17	55	−38	11	Relegation to the 2018 Thailand Amateur League

Updated to match(es) played on 20 October 2017. Source: Thai League 4
Rules for classification: 1) Points; 2) Head-to-head points; 3) Head-to-head goals difference; 4) Head-to-head goals scored; 5) Overall goals difference; 6) Overall goals scored; 7) Fair play points; 8) Play-off without extra time;).
(C) Champions; (P) Promoted; (Q) Qualified for the phase indicated; (R) Relegated

== Results 1st and 2nd match for each team ==
Home \ Away	BKHU	CHA	CHOB	KAB	MAP	NANA	PAT	PRA	RAU	RTF
Bankhai United		1–2	4–0	2–0	1–2	2–2	2–0	2–0	1–2	1–1
Chanthaburi	1–0		1–0	2–1	1–2	1–0	1–0	1–0	0–0	2–1
Chonburi B	5–2	0–0		0–3	2–1	0–0	2–0	4–1	4–1	0–0
Kabin United	1–0	0–0	1–2		1–1	2–2	0–0	0–1	2–1	0–0
Marines Eureka	2–2	2–2	2–2	2–1		3–0	2–1	2–0	2–2	0–0
Nakhon Nayok	1–4	1–1	1–1	1–1	1–2		1–0	2–1	0–0	1–1
Pattaya	2–2	3–2	2–6	3–0	1–2	4–1		2–0	1–2	1–2
Prachinburi United	1–4	0–2	2–0	1–2	2–2	0–1	0–0		0–0	0–2
Pluak Daeng Rayong United	4–1	2–2	1–3	1–0	1–1	2–0	2–2	1–0		2–1
Royal Thai Fleet	2–0	0–1	5–1	1–1	0–1	1–1	2–0	2–2	1–0	

Updated to match(es) played on 9 July 2017. Source: Thai League 4
Legend: Blue = home team win; Yellow = draw; Red = away team win.

== Results 3rd match for each team ==
In the third leg, the winner on head-to-head result of the first and the second leg will be home team. If head-to-head result are tie, must to find the home team from head-to-head goals different. If all of head-to-head still tie, must to find the home team from penalty kickoff on the end of each second leg match (This penalty kickoff don't bring to calculate points on league table, it's only the process to find the home team on third leg).

Home \ Away	BKHU	CHA	CHOB	KAB	MAP	NANA	PAT	PRA	RAU	RTF
Bankhai United			1–1	2–1		2–2	3–2	3–1		
Chanthaburi	1–1		1–0	1–2		1–2	3–2	6–0	0–0	1–1
Chonburi B					0–1	6–0	0–0	1–1	2–1	
Kabin United			0–2					3–1		1–2
Marines Eureka	2–0	1–2		0–1		3–0	2–2	1–0		1–2
Nakhon Nayok				2–1				2–1		1–1
Pattaya				3–0		2–0		4–2		
Prachinburi United										
Pluak Daeng Rayong United	2–0			3–0	1–0	3–0	0–0	2–0		
Royal Thai Fleet	2–2		2–2				2–1	4–0	0–0	

Updated to match(es) played on 10 September 2017. Source: Thai League 4
Legend: Blue = home team win; Yellow = draw; Red = away team win.

== Season statistics ==
=== Top scorers ===
As of 10 September 2017.

Rank	Player	Club	Goals
1	(United States) Dawda Dibba	Pattaya	20
2	(Thailand) Wuttichai Asusheewa	Royal Thai Fleet	12
3	(Cameroon) Mbassegus Mbarga	Chanthaburi	11
4	(Thailand) Pacharadanai Lamsan	Bankhai United	8
4	(Cameroon) Lionel Frank	Marines Eureka	8
4	(South Korea) Lee Jung-hun	Chanthaburi	8
7	(Thailand) Pipob On-Mo	Chonburi B	7
7	(France) David Le Bras	Nakhon Nayok	7
7	(Thailand) Thirawut Thiwato	Uttaradit (1), Chanthaburi (6)	7
7	(Ghana) Boahen Clement	Marines Eureka	7
7	(Thailand) Pratya Narach	Pluak Daeng Rayong United	7

== Attendance ==
Pos	Team	Total	High	Low	Average	Change
1	Chanthaburi	7,571	825	309	473	n/a
2	Rayong United	6,002	642	134	400	n/a
3	Royal Thai Fleet	4,996	700	24	356	n/a
4	Bankhai United	4,985	600	120	356	n/a
5	Kabin United	3,230	400	100	269	n/a
6	Nakhon Nayok	2,400	470	150	200	n/a
7	Pattaya	1,890	370	100	189	n/a
8	Prachinburi United	1,632	500	80	181	n/a
9	Chonburi B	1,779	255	40	136	n/a
10	Marines Eureka	1,861	255	53	124	n/a
	League total	37,451	825	24	288	n/a

Updated to games played on 10 September 2017
Source: Thai League 4

== See also ==
- 2017 Thai League
- 2017 Thai League 2
- 2017 Thai League 3
- 2017 Thai League 4
- 2017 Thailand Amateur League
- 2017 Thai FA Cup
- 2017 Thai League Cup
- 2017 Thailand Champions Cup
