= Regional League Bangkok & Eastern Division =

- Founded: 2016
- Folded: 2017
- Country: Thailand
- Number of clubs: 11
- Level on pyramid: 3
- Promotion to: Regional League Division 2
- Domestic cup(s): FA Cup; Thai League Cup
- Current: 2016

Regional League Bangkok & Eastern Division is the 3rd Level League in Thailand. It was formed in 2016 along with another region, making it 8 regions/leagues at the same level. The winner and runner-up of each regional league enter the Regional League Championships to determine the three teams that will receive promotion to the Thai Division 1 League.

== League history ==
Formed in 2016, with 11 clubs.

== Timeline ==
Year	Important events	Participating clubs
2016	1st ever Regional League Bangkok & Eastern starts.	11

== Championship history ==
Season	Winner	Runner up	Third place
2016	Raj Pracha	Customs United	Banbueng United

== Member clubs ==
Club	Province	Years
Ban Bueng United	Chonburi	2016
Customs United	Bangkok	2016
Inter Pattaya	Chonburi	2016
Kasem Bundit University	Bangkok	2016
Look Isan	Bangkok	2016
Pattaya	Chonburi	2016
Pathum Thani United	Pathum Thani	2016
Raj Pracha	Bangkok	2016
Royal Thai Fleet	Chonburi	2016
Samut Prakan United	Samut Prakan	2016
Sinthana Kabinburi	Prachinburi	2016
