= 2018 Thai League 4 Eastern Region =

Thai League 4 Eastern Region
- Season: 2018
- Champions: Bankhai United
- Relegated: Nakhon Nayok
- Matches: 135
- Goals: 313 (2.32 per match)
- Top goalscorer: (Thailand) Chainarong Samuttha (16 goals)
- Biggest home win: Nakhon Nayok 3–0 Royal Thai Fleet (3 March 2018)
- Biggest away win: Royal Thai Fleet 0–4 Chonburi U-23 (25 February 2018)
- Highest scoring: 9 goals Nakhon Nayok 3–6 Chanthaburi (26 August 2018)
- Longest winning run: 6 matches Chanthaburi
- Longest unbeaten run: 11 matches Bankhai United
- Longest losing run: 4 matches Chonburi U-23; Isan D'beachaura Pattaya
- Highest attendance: 485; Chanthaburi 1–0 Pluak Daeng Rayong United (18 March 2018)
- Lowest attendance: 80; Pluak Daeng Rayong United 3–1 Kabin United (24 February 2018)
- Total attendance: 30,654
- Average attendance: 232

2018 Thai League 4 Eastern Region is the 9th season of the League competition since its establishment in 2009. It is in the fourth tier of the Thai football league system.

== Changes from Last Season ==
=== Team changes ===
==== Promoted Clubs ====
Promoted from the 2017 Thailand Amateur League Eastern Region

- Isan Pattaya

Promoted to the 2018 Thai League 3 Upper Region

- Marines Eureka

==== Relegated Clubs ====
Relegated to the 2018 Thailand Amateur League Eastern Region

- Prachinburi United

==== Renamed Clubs ====
- Isan Pattaya was renamed to Isan D'beachaura Pattaya
- Chonburi B was renamed to Chonburi U-23

=== Expansion Clubs ===
- Pattaya Club-licensing football club didn't pass to play 2018 Thai League 4 Eastern Region. This team is banned 2 years and Relegated to 2020 Thailand Amateur League Eastern Region.

=== Reserving Clubs ===
- Pattaya United U-23 is Pattaya United Reserving this team which join Northeastern Region first time.
- Navy U-23 is Navy Reserving this team which join Northeastern Region first time.

== Stadium and locations ==
Locations of the 2018 Thai League 4 Eastern Region Teams

Team	Location	Stadium	Ref.
Bankhai United	Rayong	Wai Krong Stadium	1,362
Chanthaburi	Chanthaburi	Chanthaburi PAO. Stadium	
Chonburi U-23	Chonburi	Chonburi Stadium	
Isan D'beachaura Pattaya	Chonburi	Nong Prue Stadium	
Kabin United	Prachinburi	Nom Klao Maharaj Stadium	
Nakhon Nayok	Nakhon Nayok	Nakhon Nayok PAO. Stadium	
Navy U-23	Chonburi	Sattahip Navy Stadium	
Pattaya United U-23	Chonburi	Nong Prue Stadium	
Pluak Daeng Rayong United	Rayong	Rayong Province Central Stadium	
Royal Thai Fleet	Chonburi	Sattahip Navy Stadium	

== League table ==
Pos	Team	Pld	W	D	L	GF	GA	GD	Pts	Qualification or relegation
1	Bankhai United (C, Q)	27	13	10	4	34	18	+16	49	Qualification to Group Stage round of Thai League 4 Champions League
2	Chanthaburi (Q)	27	14	6	7	39	27	+12	48	Qualification to Group Stage round of Thai League 4 Champions League
3	Pluakdaeng Rayong United (Q)	27	11	8	8	40	28	+12	41	Qualification to Preliminary round 1 of Thai League 4 Champions League
4	Royal Thai Fleet	27	10	10	7	29	27	+2	40	
5	Kabin United	27	9	8	10	35	35	0	35 (Note: Kabin United head-to-head record equaluate to Isan D'beachaura Pattaya. Kabin United ahead on Goal Different; Kabin United 0, Isan D'beachaura Pattaya -5)	
6	Isan D'beachaura Pattaya	27	9	8	10	31	36	−5	35	
7	Nakhon Nayok (R)	27	9	7	11	37	43	−6	34	Relegation to the 2019 Thailand Amateur League
8	Chonburi U-23	27	6	11	10	33	36	−3	29	Could not compete in 2019 Thai League 4 when this zone have member too much. PLT judge this quota
9	Navy U-23	27	6	9	12	29	42	−13	27	Could not compete in 2019 Thai League 4 when this zone have member too much. PLT judge this quota
10	Pattaya United U-23	27	4	11	12	19	34	−15	23	Could not compete in 2019 Thai League 4

Updated to match(es) played on 26 August 2018; PLT etiquette meeting report of Nakhon Nayok vs Pattaya United U-23 in this link. Source: Thai League 4
Rules for classification: 1) Points; 2) Head-to-head points; 3) Overall goals difference; 4) Overall goals scored; 5) Fair play points; 6) Play-off without extra time;).
(C) Champions; (Q) Qualified for the phase indicated; (R) Relegated

=== Results by match played ===
Team ╲ Round	1	2	3	4	5	6	7	8	9	10	11	12	13	14	15	16	17	18	19	20	21	22	23	24	25	26	27
Bankhai United	D	W	D	L	W	W	L	L	W	D	W	D	W	D	D	L	W	D	W	W	W	W	D	D	D	W	W
Chanthaburi	L	L	D	W	W	W	W	W	L	D	L	D	W	D	W	W	D	L	D	L	L	W	W	W	W	W	W
Pluak Daeng Rayong United	D	W	W	W	L	L	D	L	W	D	D	D	W	D	L	W	W	W	L	W	L	W	D	L	L	W	D
Royal Thai Fleet	D	W	L	L	D	W	W	L	L	D	W	D	L	W	D	D	D	D	W	W	W	D	D	L	W	W	L
Isan D'beachaura Pattaya	D	L	W	W	D	D	D	L	L	W	D	D	L	L	W	W	D	D	L	L	L	L	W	W	W	L	W
Kabin United	D	W	L	L	D	L	W	W	D	L	L	D	L	L	D	W	W	D	W	W	W	L	L	D	D	W	L
Nakhon Nayok	D	L	L	W	W	L	D	L	W	D	L	D	W	W	D	L	L	W	L	L	W	D	D	W	W	L	L
Chonburi U-23	D	W	W	D	L	W	D	W	D	D	L	D	D	D	D	L	L	D	L	W	L	D	L	L	L	L	W
Navy U-23	D	L	D	L	D	L	L	W	W	D	W	L	L	W	D	L	D	D	W	L	D	L	W	D	L	L	L
Pattaya United U-23	W	L	D	D	L	D	L	W	L	D	W	W	D	L	L	D	L	L	D	L	D	D	D	L	L	L	D

Source: Thai League 4
W = Win; D = Draw; L = Loss

== Results 1st and 2nd match for each team ==
Home \ Away	BKU	CTB	CBR	IDP	KBU	NNY	RTN	PAT	PRU	RTF
Bankhai United		1–1	0–0	0–1	0–3	1–0	2–0	2–0	2–2	1–0
Chanthaburi	0–0		2–0	2–2	2–1	1–2	2–0	0–0	1–0	0–2
Chonburi U-23	1–1	0–0		0–0	0–0	1–1	0–3	0–0	2–1	2–2
Isan D'beachaura Pattaya	0–1	1–3	1–0		0–0	1–0	1–3	1–1	1–1	1–3
Kabin United	1–0	0–1	3–3	1–2		3–2	0–0	2–1	0–0	0–0
Nakhon Nayok	0–3	2–0	0–3	0–0	2–4		2–2	2–0	2–4	3–0
Navy U-23	2–2	0–1	1–3	2–2	3–1	0–0		0–1	0–3	1–1
Pattaya United U-23	2–1	1–0	2–2	2–3	3–2	1–2	0–0		1–3	1–3
Pluak Daeng Rayong United	0–2	1–3	3–1	2–0	3–1	0–0	3–2	1–0		0–0
Royal Thai Fleet	2–2	2–1	0–4	0–0	2–1	0–1	0–2	0–0	0–0	

Updated to match(es) played on 2 July 2018. Source: Thai League 4
Legend: Blue = home team win; Yellow = draw; Red = away team win.

== Results 3rd match for each team ==
In the third leg, the winner on head-to-head result of the first and the second leg will be home team. If head-to-head result are tie, must to find the home team from head-to-head goals different. If all of head-to-head still tie, must to find the home team from penalty kickoff on the end of each second leg match (This penalty kickoff don't bring to calculate points on league table, it's only the process to find the home team on third leg).

Home \ Away	BKU	CTB	CBR	IDP	KBU	NNY	RTN	PAT	PRU	RTF
Bankhai United			2–0	1–0		2–1	2–2	3–0	0–0	2–0
Chanthaburi	0–1		3–1	3–2	1–0		3–1		2–1	
Chonburi U-23					3–0	2–4		1–1		1–2
Isan D'beachaura Pattaya			3–2		1–3	2–3		1–0		
Kabin United	0–0					3–1		1–0		
Nakhon Nayok		3–6						1–1		1–1
Navy U-23			0–1	1–2	2–1	1–0				1–4
Pattaya United U-23		1–1					0–0			
Pluak Daeng Rayong United			1–0	2–1	3–4	1–2	5–0	0–0		0–1
Royal Thai Fleet		2–0		0–2	0–0			2–0		

Updated to match(es) played on 26 August 2018. Source: Thai League 4
Legend: Blue = home team win; Yellow = draw; Red = away team win.

== Season statistics ==
=== Top scorers ===
As of 26 August 2018.

Rank	Player	Club	Goals
1	(Thailand) Chainarong Samuttha	Chanthaburi	16
2	(Thailand) Wuttichai Asusheewa	Royal Thai Fleet	9
3	(Ghana) Amidu Jamal	Kabin United	8
3	(Thailand) Metee Pungpo	Kabin United	8
3	(Thailand) Kanin Ketkaew	Navy U-23	8
3	(Thailand) Warut Trongkratok	Pluak Daeng Rayong United	8
7	(Thailand) Treepect Kruea-ranya	Isan D'beachaura Pattaya	7
7	(Mali) Souleymane Coulibaly	Nakhon Nayok	7
7	(Thailand) Niphit Srithong	Nakhon Nayok	7
7	(Thailand) Kitja Mukdasanit	Pluak Daeng Rayong United	7
7	(Thailand) Wanasnunt Thana	Royal Thai Fleet	7

=== Hat-tricks ===
Player	For	Against	Result	Date
(Thailand) Chainarong Samuttha	Chanthaburi	Isan D'beachaura Pattaya	3–1	2 April 2018
(Thailand) Chainarong Samuttha^{4}	Chanthaburi	Nakhon Nayok	6–3	26 August 2018

== Attendance ==
Pos	Team	Total	High	Low	Average	Change
1	Chanthaburi	5,283	485	267	352	−25.6%
2	Royal Thai Fleet	3,930	590	200	328	−7.9%
3	Pluak Daeng Rayong United	3,629	460	80	242	−39.5%
4	Kabin United	2,718	450	107	227	−15.6%
5	Bankhai United	3,619	385	85	226	−36.5%
6	Isan D'beachaura Pattaya	2,670	400	100	205	n/a
7	Chonburi U-23	2,510	450	100	193	+41.9%
8	Navy U-23	2,670	380	116	184	n/a
9	Pattaya United U-23	1,898	380	58	173	n/a
10	Nakhon Nayok	1,727	249	70	157	−21.5%
	League total	30,654	485	58	232	−19.4%

Updated to games played on 26 August 2018
Source: Thai League 4

=== Attendance by home match played ===
Team \ Match played	1	2	3	4	5	6	7	8	9	10	11	12	13	14	15	16	Total
Bankhai United	200	370	150	267	327	160	250	300	138	140	99	85	385	200	318	230	3,619
Chanthaburi	465	285	363	485	385	325	285	325	350	346	327	267	365	385	325		5,283
Chonburi U-23	300	110	150	200	200	100	Unk.1	450	150	200	200	250	200				2,510
Isan D'beachaura Pattaya	400	200	200	200	200	100	170	300	200	200	200	100	200				2,670
Kabin United	223	107	150	300	120	200	280	180	200	108	400	450					2,718
Nakhon Nayok	225	100	104	229	150	100	cancel	150	200	150	70	249					1,727
Navy U-23	216	291	267	170	121	125	129	116	380	126	157	116	217	149			2,580
Pattaya United U-23	279	329	117	104	120	100	91	110	380	210	58						1,898
Pluak Daeng Rayong United	160	80	460	358	385	283	323	350	150	200	215	230	160	125	150	150	3,779
Royal Thai Fleet	400	200	350	450	410	590	250	280	250	100	400	250					3,930

Source: Thai League 4
Note:
cancel Pattaya United U-23 don't play Nakhon Nayok vs Pattaya United U-23 game. PLT judge this game to Nakhon Nayok win 2 - 0.
Unk.1 Some error of T4 official match report 20 May 2018 (Chonburi U-23 0–0 Chanthaburi).

== See also ==
- 2018 Thai League
- 2018 Thai League 2
- 2018 Thai League 3
- 2018 Thai League 4
- 2018 Thailand Amateur League
- 2018 Thai FA Cup
- 2018 Thai League Cup
- 2018 Thailand Champions Cup
