= 2016 Thai League Cup =

Tournament details
- Country: Thailand
- Dates: 6 February 2016 – 15 October 2016

Final positions
- Champions: Buriram United (5th title); Muangthong United (1st title)

Tournament statistics
- Top goal scorer(s): Kaio Felipe Gonçalves (7 goals)

The Thai League Cup is a knock-out football tournament played in Thai sport. Some games are played as a single match, others are played as two-legged contests. The 2016 Thai League Cup kicked off on 6 February 2016. The Thai League Cup has been readmitted back into Thai football after a 10-year absence. The Thai League Cup is sponsored by Toyota, thus naming it Toyota League Cup. The prize money for this prestigious award is said to be around 5 million baht, and the runners-up will be netting 1 million baht.

The prize money is not the only benefit of this cup, the team winning the fair play spot will get a Hilux Vigo. The MVP of the competition will get a Toyota Camry Hybrid Car. The winner of the cup will earn the right to participate in a cup competition in Japan.

This was the first edition of the competition and the qualifying round was played in regions featuring clubs from the Regional League Division 2.

Following the death of King Bhumibol Adulyadej, the Football Association of Thailand cancelled the remaining league and cup season on 14 October 2016, stating that the League Cup winners would be determined by a lottery draw. This was when only the final was required to be played and would determine who would represent Thailand in the Mekong Club Championship.

The following day, however (15 October), FAT appeared to do a U-turn and announced that further discussions with key stakeholders would determine whether the league campaign would continue. These discussions were required as teams that were in the relegation places at the time of the original announcement were voicing their concerns.

On the 16 October, after a meeting of all top flight league clubs, it was announced that the original decision to cancel the remaining games would stay in place, therefore crowning Muangthong United and Buriram United as joint champions.

== Calendar ==
Round	Date	Matches	Clubs	New entries this round
1st Qualification Round	23 March 2016	64	34 → 17 to First Round and 30 → 15 to Lastly, Qualification Round	64 Regional League Division 2
2nd Qualification Round	30 March 2016 and 6 April 2016	13	15 + 11 → 13 to First Round	11 Regional League Division 2
First Round	9 and 10 April 2016	32	17 + 13 + 16 + 18 → 32	18 2016 Thai Division 1 League; 16 2016 Thai Premier League
Second Round	8 June 2016	16	32 → 16	
Third Round	6 July 2016	8	16 → 8	
Quarter-finals	10 August 2016	4	8 → 4	
Semi-finals	17 August 2016	4	4 → 2	
Semi-finals	14 September 2016	4	4 → 2	
Final	15 October 2016	1	2 → Champions	
Total				99 clubs

== 1st Qualification Round ==
=== Northern Region ===
The qualifying round was in regions featuring clubs from the 2016 Thai Division 2 League Northern Region

23 March 2016	Nan	2 – 3	Tak City	Nan
15:30 (UTC+7)		report		Stadium: Nan Provincial Administrative Organization Stadium

23 March 2016	Phetchabun	1 – 1 (a.e.t.)(4 – 3 p)	Phitsanulok TSY	Phetchabun
15:30 (UTC+7)		report		Stadium: IPE Phetchabun Stadium

23 March 2016	Phayao	2 – 3 (a.e.t.)	Nong Bua Pitchaya	Phayao
18:00 (UTC+7)		report		Stadium: Phayao Provincial Administrative Organization Stadium

23 March 2016	Kamphaeng Phet	0 – 1	Loei City	Kamphaeng Phet
18:00 (UTC+7)		report		Stadium: Cha Kung Rao Stadium

=== North Eastern Region ===
The qualifying round was in regions featuring clubs from the 2016 Thai Division 2 League North Eastern Region

23 March 2016	Sakon Nakhon	1 – 1 (a.e.t.)(4 – 5 p)	Nong Khai FT	Sakon Nakhon
15:30 (UTC+7)		report		Stadium: Sakon Nakhon City municipality Stadium

23 March 2016	Yasothon	2 – 2 (a.e.t.)(5 – 4 p)	Mukdahan Lamkhong	Yasothon
15:30 (UTC+7)		report		Stadium: Suan Phayathan Stadium

23 March 2016	Sisaket United	6 – 2	Kalasin	Sisaket
18:00 (UTC+7)		report		Stadium: Sri Nakhon Lamduan Stadium

23 March 2016	Ubon Ratchathani	0 – 0 (a.e.t.)(3 – 5 p)	Khonkaen	Ubon Rachathani
18:00 (UTC+7)		report		Stadium: Ubon Rachathani Sports School Stadium

23 March 2016	Roi Et United	2 – 1	Surin City	Roi Et
18:00 (UTC+7)		report		Stadium: Roi Et Province Stadium

=== Central Region ===
The qualifying round was played in regions featuring clubs from the 2016 Thai Division 2 League Central Region

23 March 2016	Ayutthaya United	2 – 1	Saraburi TRU	Ayutthaya
15:30 (UTC+7)		report		Stadium: Senabordee Stadium

23 March 2016	Phan Thong	1 – 4	Ayutthaya Warrior	Chonburi
15:30 (UTC+7)		report		Stadium: IPE Chonburi Stadium

23 March 2016	Uthai Thani Forest	0 – 1	Nakhon Sawan	Uthai Thani
17:00 (UTC+7)		report		Stadium: Uthai Thani Province Stadium

=== Eastern Region ===
The qualifying round was played in regions featuring clubs from the 2016 Thai Division 2 League Eastern Region

23 March 2016	Prachinburi United	0 – 1	Chanthaburi	Prachinburi
16:00 (UTC+7)		report		Stadium: Prachinburi Provincial Administrative Organization Stadium

23 March 2016	Pluak Daeng Rayong United	1 – 1 (a.e.t.)(3 – 5 p)	Kabin United	Rayong
18:00 (UTC+7)		report		Stadium: Pattana Sport Club Stadium

23 March 2016	Pattaya City	0 – 0 (a.e.t.)(4 – 5 p)	Sa Kaeo	Chonburi
18:00 (UTC+7)		report		Stadium: Nong Prue 2 stadium

23 March 2016	Cha Choeng Sao	2 – 1	Nakhon Nayok	Chachoengsao
18:30 (UTC+7)		report		Stadium: Chachoengsao Town municipality Stadium

=== Western Region ===
The qualifying round was played in regions featuring clubs from the 2016 Thai Division 2 League Western Region

23 March 2016	Assumption United	3 – 0	IPE Samut Sakhon	Nonthaburi
16:00 (UTC+7)		report		Stadium: SCG Stadium

23 March 2016	Samut Sakhon	6 – 0	Nonthaburi	Samut Sakhon
18:00 (UTC+7)		report		Stadium: Samut Sakhon Province Stadium

23 March 2016	Thonburi City	1 – 4	BTU United	Bangkok
18:00 (UTC+7)		report		Stadium: 84 Birthday Anniversary of His Majesty the King Sport Club

23 March 2016	Muangkan United	2 – 3	Krung Thonburi	Kanchanaburi
18:00 (UTC+7)		report		Stadium: Kleab Bua Stadium

=== Bangkok & Eastern Region ===
The qualifying round was played in regions featuring clubs from the 2016 Thai Division 2 League Bangkok & Eastern Region

23 March 2016	Kasem Bundit University	2 – 0	Samut Prakan United	Bangkok
15:30 (UTC+7)		report		Stadium: Kasem Bundit University Stadium

23 March 2016	Raj Pracha	0 – 0 (a.e.t.)(2 – 4 p)	Inter Pattaya	Bangkok
15:30 (UTC+7)		report		Stadium: King Mongkut's Institute of Technology Ladkrabang Stadium

23 March 2016	Royal Thai Fleet	1 – 0	Pathum Thani United	Chonburi
15:30 (UTC+7)		report		Stadium: Sattahip Navy Stadium

23 March 2016	Customs United	6 – 1	Sinthana Kabinburi	Bangkok
18:00 (UTC+7)		report		Stadium: Lad Krabang 54 Stadium

23 March 2016	Pattaya	0 – 1	Look Isan	Chonburi
18:00 (UTC+7)		report		Stadium: Nong Prue Stadium

=== Bangkok & field Region ===
The qualifying round was played in regions featuring clubs from the 2016 Thai Division 2 League Bangkok & field Region

23 March 2016	Dome	0 – 1	Bangkok Christian College	Pathum Thani
15:30 (UTC+7)		report		Stadium: Thammasat Stadium

23 March 2016	North Bangkok College	0 – 0 (a.e.t.)(2 – 4 p)	Kasetsart University	Pathum Thani
15:30 (UTC+7)		report		Stadium: North Bangkok University Rangsit Campus Stadium

23 March 2016	Royal Thai Army	1 – 0	Rangsit	Bangkok
16:00 (UTC+7)		report		Stadium: Thai Army Sports Stadium

=== Southern Region ===
The qualifying round was played in regions featuring clubs from the 2016 Thai Division 2 League Southern Region

23 March 2016	Yala United	5 – 1	Phattalung	Yala
15:00 (UTC+7)		report		Stadium: Jaru Stadium

23 March 2016	Satun United	2 – 1	Nara United	Satun
15:30 (UTC+7)		report		Stadium: Satun Municipal Stadium

23 March 2016	Phang Nga	4 – 5 (a.e.t.)	Pattani	Phang Nga
17:00 (UTC+7)		report		Stadium: Phang Nga Province Stadium

23 March 2016	Phuket	3 – 2 (a.e.t.)	Ranong United	Phuket
19:00 (UTC+7)		report		Stadium: Surakul Stadium

== 2nd Qualification Round ==
=== Northern Region ===
The qualifying round was played in regions featuring clubs from the 2016 Thai Division 2 League Northern Region

30 March 2016	Phetchabun	0 – 1 (a.e.t.)	Lamphun Warrior	Phetchabun
17:00 (UTC+7)		report		Stadium: IPE Phetchabun Stadium

30 March 2016	Nong Bua Pitchaya	4 – 0	Phrae United	Nong Bua Lam Phu
17:00 (UTC+7)		report		Stadium: Nong Bua Lamphu Province Stadium

30 March 2016	Tak City	3 – 1	Uttaradit	Tak
18:00 (UTC+7)		report		Stadium: Tak Provincial Administrative Organization Stadium

=== Central Region ===
The qualifying round was played in regions featuring clubs from the 2016 Thai Division 2 League Central Region

30 March 2016	Nakhon Sawan	2 – 2 (a.e.t.)(7 – 6 p)	Singburi Bang Rachan	Nakhon Sawan
18:00 (UTC+7)		report		Stadium: Nakhon Sawan Stadium

=== Eastern Region ===
The qualifying round was played in regions featuring clubs from the 2016 Thai Division 2 League Eastern Region

30 March 2016	Kabin United	2 – 1	Marines Eureka	Prachinburi
15:30 (UTC+7)		report		Stadium: Nom Klao Maharaj Stadium

30 March 2016	Sa Kaeo	3 – 0	TA Benchamarachuthit	Sa Kaeo
17:00 (UTC+7)		report		Stadium: Sa Kaeo Provincial Administrative Organization Stadium

30 March 2016	Cha Choeng Sao	3 – 1	Samut Prakan	Chachoengsao
18:30 (UTC+7)		report		Stadium: Chachoengsao Town municipality Stadium

=== Western Region ===
The qualifying round was played in regions featuring clubs from the 2016 Thai Division 2 League Western Region

30 March 2016	BTU United	1 – 0	Simork	Bangkok
18:00 (UTC+7)		report		Stadium: Bangkokthonburi University Stadium

=== Bangkok & Eastern Region ===
The qualifying round was played in regions featuring clubs from the 2016 Thai Division 2 League Bangkok & Eastern Region

30 March 2016	Look Isan	3 – 2	Banbueng United	Bangkok
15:30 (UTC+7)		report		Stadium: Ramkhamhaeng University Stadium

30 March 2016	Inter Pattaya	0 – 0 (a.e.t.)(6 – 5 p)	Royal Thai Fleet	Chonburi
15:30 (UTC+7)		report		Stadium: Pattana Sport club stadium

30 March 2016	Customs United	3 – 2 (a.e.t.)	Kasem Bundit University	Bangkok
18:00 (UTC+7)		report		Stadium: Lad Krabang 54 Stadium

=== Bangkok & field Region ===
The qualifying round was played in regions featuring clubs from the 2016 Thai Division 2 League Bangkok & field Region

30 March 2016	Bangkok Christian College	1 – 3	Grakcu Tabfah Pathum Thani	Bangkok
19:00 (UTC+7)		report		Stadium: PAT Stadium

=== Southern Region ===
The qualifying round was played in regions featuring clubs from the 2016 Thai Division 2 League Southern Region

6 April 2016	Phuket	1 – 0 (a.e.t.)	Surat	Phuket
19:00 (UTC+7)		report		Stadium: Surakul Stadium

== First round ==
9 April 2016	Satun United	0 – 1	Pattaya United	Satun
15:30 (UTC+7)		report	Soony Saad 83'	Stadium: Satun Municipal Stadium

9 April 2016	Kasetsart University	0 – 0 (a.e.t.)(3 – 0 p)	Ang Thong	Bangkok
15:30 (UTC+7)		report		Stadium: Intree Chantarasatit Stadium

9 April 2016	Pattani	1 – 1 (a.e.t.)(3 – 4 p)	SCG Muangthong United	Pattani
15:45 (UTC+7)	Elvis Job 16'	report	Atit Daosawang 27'	Stadium: Rainbow Stadium

9 April 2016	Nong Bua Pitchaya	w/o	Khon Kaen United	Nong Bua Lam Phu
17:00 (UTC+7)		report		Stadium: Nong Bua Lamphu Province Stadium

9 April 2016	Nong Khai FT	1 – 1 (a.e.t.)(4 – 3 p)	Samut Songkhram	Nong Khai
17:00 (UTC+7)	Payungsak Phannarat 90+3'	report	Guy Hubert 30'	Stadium: Nong Khai Province Stadium

9 April 2016	Ubon UMT United	4 – 0	Army United	Ubon Ratchathani
18:00 (UTC+7)	Febian Brandy 42'; Alex Rafael 65', 69', 90+5'	report		Stadium: Tung Burapha Stadium

9 April 2016	Chanthaburi	2 – 0	Ratchaburi	Chanthaburi
18:00 (UTC+7)	Pradipat Armatanpri 29'; Cho Byung-jun 82'	report		Stadium: Chanthaburi Province Stadium

9 April 2016	Roi Et United	1 – 4	Lampang	Roi Et
18:00 (UTC+7)	Pitchanon Janluang 60'	report	Sirisak Musbu-ngor 42'; Sirichai Lamphuttha 74'; Maycon Calijuri 82'; Chennarong Wongnoi 89'	Stadium: Roi Et Province Stadium

9 April 2016	Customs United	0 – 2	Air Force Central	Bangkok
18:00 (UTC+7)		report	Sarawut Inpan 24'; Apisit Soratha 90+3'	Stadium: Lad Krabang 54 Stadium

9 April 2016	Nakhon Sawan	1 – 3 (a.e.t.)	BBCU	Nakhon Sawan
18:00 (UTC+7)	Chaloemraph At-han 88'	report	Apisorn Phumchat 82'; Pummared Kladkleeb 99', 113'	Stadium: Nakhon Sawan Stadium

9 April 2016	Ayutthaya Warrior	1 – 1 (a.e.t.)(5 – 4 p)	Bangkok	Ayutthaya
18:00 (UTC+7)	Somprasong Chuengjan 49'	report	David Silva 42'	Stadium: Ayutthaya Province Stadium

9 April 2016	Samut Sakhon	1 – 4	Chonburi	Samut Sakhon
18:00 (UTC+7)	Songwut Buapetch 71' (o.g.); Aliou Seck 78'	report	Leandro Assumpção 8'; Phanuphong Phonsa 48'; Prakit Deeprom 62'	Stadium: Samut Sakhon Province Stadium

9 April 2016	Lamphun Warrior	1 – 0	Chainat	Lamphun
19:00 (UTC+7)	Chayapol Udonphan 13' (pen.)	report		Stadium: Mae Guang Stadium

9 April 2016	Khonkaen	2 – 1 (a.e.t.)	Prachuap	Khon Kaen
19:00 (UTC+7)	Ahmed Shaaban 58'; Seiya Kojima 116'	report	Kwon Dae-hee 86'	Stadium: Khon Kaen Stadium

9 April 2016	Assumption United	1 – 2 (a.e.t.)	BEC Tero Sasana	Nonthaburi
19:00 (UTC+7)	Dongmo Romuald 44'; Ulrich Munze 102' (o.g.)	report	Miloš Bosančić 90+1'	Stadium: SCG Stadium

9 April 2016	Phuket	1 – 4	Bangkok United	Phuket
19:00 (UTC+7)	Baek Yong-sun 45+3'	report	Noraphat Kaikaew 16' (pen.), 42'; Jakkit Wechpirom 31'; Chatchai Koompraya 86'	Stadium: Surakul Stadium

10 April 2016	Yala United	1 – 2	Bangkok Glass	Yala
15:00 (UTC+7)	Francis Maurice 15'	report	Ariel Rodríguez 60' (pen.); Chatree Chimtalay 87'	Stadium: Jaru Stadium

10 April 2016	Krung Thonburi	1 – 3	PTT Rayong	Nakhon Pathom
15:30 (UTC+7)	Bouare Dediali 76'	report	Gilberto Fortunato 25', 71'; Sarawut Khongchareon 41'	Stadium: Mahidol University Salaya Campus Stadium

10 April 2016	Ayutthaya United	0 – 1	Suphanburi	Ayutthaya
15:30 (UTC+7)		report	Prat Samakrat 36'	Stadium: Senabordee Stadium

10 April 2016	Kabin United	1 – 4	Krabi	Prachinburi
15:30 (UTC+7)	Kritsana Jamparueang 65'	report	Isaac Mbengan 18', 37'; Ekkaphan Nuikaw 68'; Watcharapong Suwan 81'	Stadium: Nom Klao Maharaj Stadium

10 April 2016	Loei City	2 – 3	Siam Navy	Loei
15:30 (UTC+7)	Martin Muwanga 41'	report	Chusana Numkanitsorn 10'; André Luís 45'; Anggello Machuca 59'; Nataporn Phanrit 90+2' (o.g.)	Stadium: Loei Riverside Stadium

10 April 2016	Look Isan	1 – 2 (a.e.t.)	Thai Honda Ladkrabang	Bangkok
15:30 (UTC+7)	Tayathorn Sangtumkijkun 41' (o.g.); Adisak Khotchawet 70'	report	Tawin Butsombat 109'	Stadium: Ramkhamhaeng University Stadium

10 April 2016	Yasothon	0 – 1	Osotspa Samut Prakan	Yasothon
15:30 (UTC+7)		report	Jeerachai Ladadok 50'	Stadium: Suan Phayathan Stadium

10 April 2016	Inter Pattaya	0 – 2	Nakhon Ratchasima	Chonburi
16:00 (UTC+7)		report	Supakit Niamkong 34'; Promphong Kransumrong 90'	Stadium: Pattana Sport club stadium

10 April 2016	Royal Thai Army	1 – 7	Buriram United	Bangkok
17:00 (UTC+7)	Pongsuriyan Aebfang 53'; Phusit Khamsakul 53' (o.g.); Tanakorn Wohankhlong 79' (o.g.)	report	Weslley 5', 45+4'; Kim Seung-yong 34'; Kaio 39', 82'	Stadium: Thai Army Sports Stadium

10 April 2016	Sa Kaeo	0 – 2	Sisaket	Sa Kaeo
17:00 (UTC+7)		report	Norbert Csiki 6'; Anton Zemlianukhin 31'	Stadium: Sa Kaeo Provincial Administrative Organization Stadium

10 April 2016	Grakcu Tabfah Pathum Thani	1 – 4	Thai Port	Pathum Thani
17:00 (UTC+7)	Nunthawut Fuinchaiwang 40'; Anuchart Yoskrai 56' (o.g.)	report	David Rochela 63' (pen.); Wuttichai Tathong 71'; Genki Nagasato 78'	Stadium: Thupatemee Stadium

10 April 2016	Tak City	2 – 1	Chiangmai	Tak
17:30 (UTC+7)	Thaitan Tamboon 55'	report	Goran Šubara 52'; Kittiphan Jantatum 60' (o.g.)	Stadium: Tak Provincial Administrative Organization Stadium

10 April 2016	BTU United	0 – 2	Chiangrai United	Bangkok
18:00 (UTC+7)		report	Pichitphong Choeichiu 41'; Eakkanit Punya 90+2'	Stadium: Bangkokthonburi University Stadium

10 April 2016	Songkhla United	3 – 2	Rayong	Songkhla
18:00 (UTC+7)	Willen 29'; Parntep Chotikawin 40'; Wichitchai Raksa 65' (o.g.); Rufo Sánchez 69'	report	Saeed Salarzadeh 71'	Stadium: Nathawee Municipality Stadium

10 April 2016	Sisaket United	0 – 1	Nakhon Pathom United	Sisaket
18:00 (UTC+7)		report	Rachanon Srinork 86'	Stadium: Sri Nakhon Lamduan Stadium

10 April 2016	Cha Choeng Sao	1 – 1 (a.e.t.)(1 – 4 p)	Sukhothai	Chachoengsao
18:30 (UTC+7)	Yu Kuboki 15'	report	Kritsana Kasemkulvilai 70'	Stadium: Chachoengsao Town municipality Stadium

== Second round ==
8 June 2016	Kasetsart University	0 – 0 (a.e.t.)(5 – 4 p)	PTT Rayong	Bangkok
15:30 (UTC+7)		report		Stadium: Intree Chantarasatit Stadium

8 June 2016	Nong Bua Pitchaya	1 – 4	Pattaya United	Nong Bua Lam Phu
17:00 (UTC+7)	Banluesak Yodyingyong 41'	report	Júnior Negrão 7', 11', 37'; Peerapong Punyanumaporn 63'	Stadium: Nong Bua Lamphu Province Stadium

8 June 2016	Tak City	2 – 2 (a.e.t.)(4 – 3 p)	Siam Navy	Tak
17:30 (UTC+7)	Somchai Nirankul 11'; Sorrathanat Wongchai 36'	report	Anggello Machuca 50', 60'	Stadium: Tak Provincial Administrative Organization Stadium

8 June 2016	Nong Khai FT	0 – 7	Buriram United	Nong Khai
18:00 (UTC+7)	Attapong Phokrajang 57' (o.g.)	report	Andrés Túñez 51', 74', 90+2'; Kaio 53', 88'; Anan Buasang 82'	Stadium: Nong Khai Province Stadium

8 June 2016	Thai Port	1 – 0	Bangkok Glass	Bangkok
19:00 (UTC+7)	Pakorn Prempak 61'	report		Stadium: PAT Stadium

8 June 2016	Chanthaburi	1 – 4 (a.e.t.)	BEC Tero Sasana	Chanthaburi
18:00 (UTC+7)	Cho Byung-jun 78' (pen.)	report	Ronnachai Pongputtha 2'; Sivakorn Tiatrakul 95'; Chananan Pombuppha 115', 117'	Stadium: Chanthaburi Province Stadium

8 June 2016	Ubon UMT United	2 – 1	Chiangrai United	Ubon Ratchathani
18:00 (UTC+7)	Darryl Roberts 33', 45'	report	Hironori Saruta 47'	Stadium: Tung Burapha Stadium

8 June 2016	Krabi	4 – 1	Suphanburi	Krabi
18:00 (UTC+7)	Salahudin Arware 16'; Rodoljub Paunović 29'; Isaac Mbengan 70'; Ekkaphan Nuikaw 90+5'	report	Thossaphol Yodchan 5'	Stadium: Krabi Provincial Stadium

8 June 2016	Thai Honda Ladkrabang	0 – 1	Osotspa Samut Prakan	Bangkok
18:00 (UTC+7)		report	Jeerachai Ladadok 61'	Stadium: 72nd Anniversary Stadium

8 June 2016	Lampang	1 – 0	BBCU	Lampang
18:00 (UTC+7)	Maycon Calijuri 65' (pen.)	report		Stadium: Lampang Provincial Stadium

8 June 2016	Air Force Central	1 – 1 (a.e.t.)(5 – 6 p)	Chonburi	Pathum Thani
18:00 (UTC+7)	Valdo 35'	report	Naruphol Ar-Romsawa 66'	Stadium: Thupatemee Stadium

8 June 2016	Songkhla United	4 – 1	Nakhon Ratchasima	Songkhla
18:00 (UTC+7)	Willen 10', 69'; Sergio Suárez 41'; Kobayashi 81'	report	Marco Tagbajumi 25'	Stadium: Nathawee Municipality Stadium

8 June 2016	Nakhon Pathom United	0 – 2	SCG Muangthong United	Nakhon Pathom
18:00 (UTC+7)		report	Cleiton Silva 13'; Adisak Kraisorn 31'	Stadium: Nakhon Pathom Municipality Sport School Stadium

8 June 2016	Ayutthaya Warrior	0 – 3	Bangkok United	Ayutthaya
19:00 (UTC+7)		report	Thritti Nonsrichai 10'; Teeratep Winothai 37'; Ronnachai Rangsiyo 63'	Stadium: Ayutthaya Province Stadium

8 June 2016	Khonkaen	1 – 2 (a.e.t.)	Sukhothai	Khon Kaen
19:00 (UTC+7)	Thummayut Tonkhum 62'	report	Lursan Tiemraj 60'; Renan Marques 114'	Stadium: Khon Kaen Stadium

8 June 2016	Lamphun Warrior	0 – 1 (a.e.t.)	Sisaket	Lamphun
19:00 (UTC+7)		report	Yuttana Ruangsuksut 104'	Stadium: Mae Guang Stadium

== Third round ==
6 July 2016	Tak City	1 – 2 (a.e.t.)	Bangkok United	Tak
17:30 (UTC+7)	Sittiphong Kaullapapluek 18'	report	Jaycee John 56' (pen.); Sumanya Purisai 107'	Stadium: Tak Provincial Administrative Organization Stadium

6 July 2016	Kasetsart University	0 – 2	Buriram United	Bangkok
18:00 (UTC+7)		report	Diogo 13' (pen.); Andrés Túñez 76'	Stadium: Intree Chantarasatit Stadium

6 July 2016	Ubon UMT United	1 – 2	SCG Muangthong United	Ubon Ratchathani
18:00 (UTC+7)	Kenta Yamazaki 5'	report	Peeradon Chamratsamee 32'; Michaël N'dri 88' (pen.)	Stadium: Tung Burapha Stadium

6 July 2016	Krabi	3 – 1	Sukhothai	Krabi
18:00 (UTC+7)	Tangeni Shipahu 13'; Anuwat Jandon 79' (o.g.); Ekkarach Pankaew 90+4'; Anuwat Phomsakul 90+5' (pen.)	report		Stadium: Krabi Provincial Stadium

6 July 2016	Lampang	3 – 0	Pattaya United	Lampang
18:00 (UTC+7)	Sittichai Musbu-ngor 41'; Patipat Kamsat 70'; Maycon Calijuri 89'	report		Stadium: Lampang Provincial Stadium

6 July 2016	Thai Port	2 – 1	BEC Tero Sasana	Bangkok
18:00 (UTC+7)	Tana Chanabut 4', 17'	report	Chenrop Samphaodi 10'	Stadium: PAT Stadium

6 July 2016	Songkhla United	2 – 1	Osotspa Samut Prakan	Songkhla
18:00 (UTC+7)	Sergio Suárez 64'; Willen 90+1'	report	Baworn Tapla 60'	Stadium: Nathawee Municipality Stadium

6 July 2016	Chonburi	1 – 2 (a.e.t.)	Sisaket	Chonburi
19:00 (UTC+7)	Rodrigo Vergilio 72' (pen.)	report	Yuttana Ruangsuksut 8'; Anton Zemlianukhin 108' (pen.)	Stadium: Chonburi Stadium

== Quarter-finals ==
10 August 2016	Songkhla United	2 – 1	Sisaket	Songkhla
18:00 (UTC+7)	Willen 88'	report	Francisco Clavero Chico 78'; Samuel Cunningham 90+2' (o.g.)	Stadium: Nathawee Municipality Stadium

10 August 2016	Thai Port	4 – 1	Lampang	Bangkok
18:00 (UTC+7)	Ekkapoom Potharungroj 7'; Genki Nagasato 13'; Siwakorn Jakkuprasat 71'; Nitipong Selanon 78'	report	Ronnapee Choeykamdee 4'	Stadium: PAT Stadium

10 August 2016	Bangkok United	3 – 3 (a.e.t.)(4 – 5 p)	Buriram United	Pathumthani
19:00 (UTC+7)	Gilberto Macena 36'; Teeratep Winothai 69' (pen.); Jaycee John 110'	report	Andrés Túñez 53'; Diogo 90' (pen.); Supachok Sarachat 118'	Stadium: Thammasat Stadium

10 August 2016	SCG Muangthong United	2 – 1 (a.e.t.)	Krabi	Nonthaburi
19:00 (UTC+7)	Xisco 86'; Cleiton Silva 94'	report	Tangeni Shipahu 1'	Stadium: SCG Stadium

== Semi-finals ==
Team 1	Agg.	Team 2	1st leg	2nd leg
Buriram United	3 – 1	Songkhla United	3 – 1	0 – 0
Thai Port	2 – 3	SCG Muangthong United	1 – 2	1 – 1

=== 1st leg ===
17 August 2016	Buriram United	3 – 1	Songkhla United	Buriram
18:00 (UTC+7)	Supachok Sarachat 18'; Anon Amornlerdsak 84'; Kaio 90+1' (pen.)	report	Sergio Suárez 45+3'	Stadium: New I-Mobile Stadium; Referee: Alongkorn Feemuechang; Assistant referees: Nathakorn Chimpalee , Wichate Kaetkaew; Fourth official: Thanes Choocheun

17 August 2016	Thai Port	1 – 2	SCG Muangthong United	Bangkok
18:00 (UTC+7)	Thiago Cunha 13'	report	Xisco 35'; Teerasil Dangda 47'	Stadium: PAT Stadium; Referee: Sivakorn Poo-Udom; Assistant referees: Pariwat Pohyoo , Wiroj Lohkam; Fourth official: Suprem Nonthawong

=== 2nd leg ===
14 September 2016	Songkhla United	0 – 0	Buriram United	Songkhla
18:00 (UTC+7)		report		Stadium: Nathawee Municipality Stadium; Attendance: 3,000; Referee: Teetichai Nualjan; Assistant referees: Tanin Ruenjit , Rofig Nimcharoen; Fourth official: Songkran Boonmeekiat

14 September 2016	SCG Muangthong United	1 – 1	Thai Port	Nonthaburi
19:00 (UTC+7)	Cleiton Silva 71' (pen.)	report	Wuttichai Tathong 36'	Stadium: SCG Stadium; Referee: Chaireuk Ngamsom; Assistant referees: Pariwat Pohyoo , Teeraphol Sanyapleum; Fourth official: Anuwat Feemuechang

== Final ==
15 October 2016	Buriram United	Title shared	SCG Muangthong United	Bangkok
19:00 (UTC+7)				Stadium: Supachalasai Stadium

== See also ==
- 2016 Thai League
- 2016 Thai Division 1 League
- 2016 Regional League Division 2
- 2016 Football Division 3
- 2016 Thai FA Cup
- 2016 Kor Royal Cup

== Sources ==
- https://web.archive.org/web/20160129105719/http://www.siamsport.co.th/Sport_Football/160128_157.html
- http://www.thailandsusu.com/webboard/index.php?topic=366833.0
- http://www.thailandsusu.com/webboard/index.php?topic=367016.0
- http://www.thailandsusu.com/webboard/index.php?topic=367248.0
- http://www.thailandsusu.com/webboard/index.php?topic=367380.0
- http://www.thailandsusu.com/webboard/index.php?topic=367904.0
- Article title
- Article title
- http://www.thailandsusu.com/webboard/index.php?topic=369024.0
- http://www.thailandsusu.com/webboard/index.php?topic=369447.0
- Article title
- Article title
- http://www.thailandsusu.com/webboard/index.php?topic=369755.0
- http://www.thailandsusu.com/webboard/index.php?topic=369856.0
- http://www.thailandsusu.com/webboard/index.php?topic=369895.0
- https://www.facebook.com/ToyotaFootball/photos/a.1674807752800594.1073741828.1674194092861960/1705696179711751/?type=3&theater
- http://www.thailandsusu.com/webboard/index.php?topic=371774.0
- http://www.thailandsusu.com/webboard/index.php?topic=371881.0
- http://www.thailandsusu.com/webboard/index.php?topic=372762.0
- Article title
- http://www.thailandsusu.com/webboard/index.php?topic=374286.0
- http://www.thailandsusu.com/webboard/index.php?topic=374315.0
- http://www.thailandsusu.com/webboard/index.php?topic=374462.0
- http://www.thailandsusu.com/webboard/index.php?topic=375645.0
