= Patrick Aaltonen =

Finnish footballer (born 1994)

Personal information
- Full name: Patrick Aaltonen
- Date of birth: 18 March 1994 (age 32)
- Place of birth: Raisio, Finland
- Height: 1.75 m (5 ft 9 in)
- Position: Right back

Team information
- Current team: MPS

Youth career
- 2005–2009: HJK
- 2010–2012: Honka

Senior career*
Years	Team	Apps	(Gls)
2011–2013	Pallohonka	27	(1)
2011–2013	Honka	19	(0)
2014	HIFK	24	(0)
2015	Honka	5	(0)
2015	Ubon UMT United	15	(3)
2016	→ Inter Pattaya (loan)	4	(0)
2016–2017	Honka	2	(0)
2017	Gnistan	20	(0)
2018	PTT Rayong	14	(0)
2019	Gnistan	21	(1)
2020–2022	PK-35	52	(3)
2024–	MPS	2	(0)

International career
2010–2012	Finland U17	14	(2)
2014–2015	Finland U21	5	(1)
Medal record
Honka
Winner	Finnish Cup	2012
- * Club domestic league appearances and goals as of 14 May 2024

Patrick Aaltonen (Thai: พาทริค อัลโตเน่น, born March 18, 1994), simply known as Pate, is a Finnish-Thai professional footballer who plays as a full back for Malmin Palloseura (MPS).

== Personal life ==
Aaltonen was born in Raisio. His father is Finnish and his mother is Thai.

== Club career ==
Patrick Aaltonen began his career in 2011 playing for FC Honka in Finland. Ubon UMT United bought him in 2015. At the 2015 season he played well and the club promoted to the Thai Division 1 League. Fall 2016 Aaltonen returned to FC Honka in Kakkonen.

== Career statistics ==
As of 14 May 2024

Appearances and goals by club, season and competition
Club	Season	League			Cup (Note: Includes Suomen Cup)		Other		Total	
Club	Season	Division	Apps	Goals	Apps	Goals	Apps	Goals	Apps	Goals
Pallohonka	2011	Kakkonen	22	1	–		–		22	1
Pallohonka	2013	Kakkonen	4	0	–		–		4	0
Pallohonka	Total		26	1	0	0	0	0	26	1
Honka	2012	Veikkausliiga	16	0	2	0	4 (Note: Includes Finnish League Cup)	0	22	0
Honka	2013	Veikkausliiga	3	0	0	0	1	0	4	0
Honka	Total		19	0	2	0	5	0	26	0
VPS	2014	Veikkausliiga	0	0	0	0	1	0	1	0
HIFK	2014	Ykkönen	24	1	0	0	–		24	1
Honka	Kakkonen	Kakkonen	5	0	2	0	–		7	0
Ubon UMT United	2015	Thai Regional League	15	3	0	0	–		15	3
Inter Pattaya (loan)	2016	Thai League 3	4	0	–		–		4	0
Honka	2016	Kakkonen	2	0	0	0	–		2	0
Honka II	2016	Kolmonen	1	0	–		–		1	0
Gnistan	2017	Ykkönen	20	0	3	0	–		23	0
PTT Rayong	2018	Thai League 2	14	0	–		–		14	0
Gnistan	2019	Ykkönen	21	1	2	0	–		23	1
PK-35	2020	Kakkonen	12	2	–		–		12	2
PK-35	2021	Ykkönen	23	0	4	0	–		27	0
PK-35	2022	Kakkonen	17	1	4	0	2 (Note: Includes Ykköscup)	0	23	1
PK-35	Total		52	3	8	0	2	0	62	3
MPS	2024	Kolmonen	2	0	–		–		2	0
Career total			205	9	17	0	8	0	230	9

== Honours ==
=== Club ===
FC Honka

- Finnish Cup: 2012

Ubon UMT United

- Regional League Division 2: 2015
