= Regional League Central Division =

- Founded: 2016
- Folded: 2017
- Country: Thailand
- Number of clubs: 11
- Level on pyramid: 3
- Promotion to: Regional League Division 2
- Domestic cup(s): FA Cup; Thai League Cup
- Last champions: Ayutthaya Warrior (2016)
- Current: 2016

Regional League Central Division is the 3rd Level League in Thailand. It was formed in 2016 along with another region, making it 8 regions/leagues at the same level. The winner and runner-up of each regional league enter the Regional League Championships to determine the three teams that will receive promotion to the Thai Division 1 League.

== League history ==
Formed in 2016, with 11 clubs.

== Timeline ==
Year	Important events	Participating clubs
2016	1st ever Regional League Central starts.	11

== Championship history ==
Season	Winner	Runner up	Third place
2016	Ayutthaya Warrior	Ayutthaya	Singburi

== Member clubs ==
Club	Province	Years
Ayutthaya	Ayutthaya	2016
Ayutthaya United	Ayutthaya	2016
Ayutthaya Warrior	Ayutthaya	2016
Mashare Chaiyaphum	Chaiyaphum	2016
Nakhon Sawan	Nakhon Sawan	2016
Paknampho NSRU	Nakhon Sawan	2016
Phan Thong	Chonburi	2016
PTU Pathum Thani Seeker	Pathum Thani	2016
Saraburi TRU	Saraburi	2016
Singburi	Singburi	2016
Uthai Thani Forest	Uthai Thani	2016
