= Niweat Siriwong =

Thai footballer (born 1977)

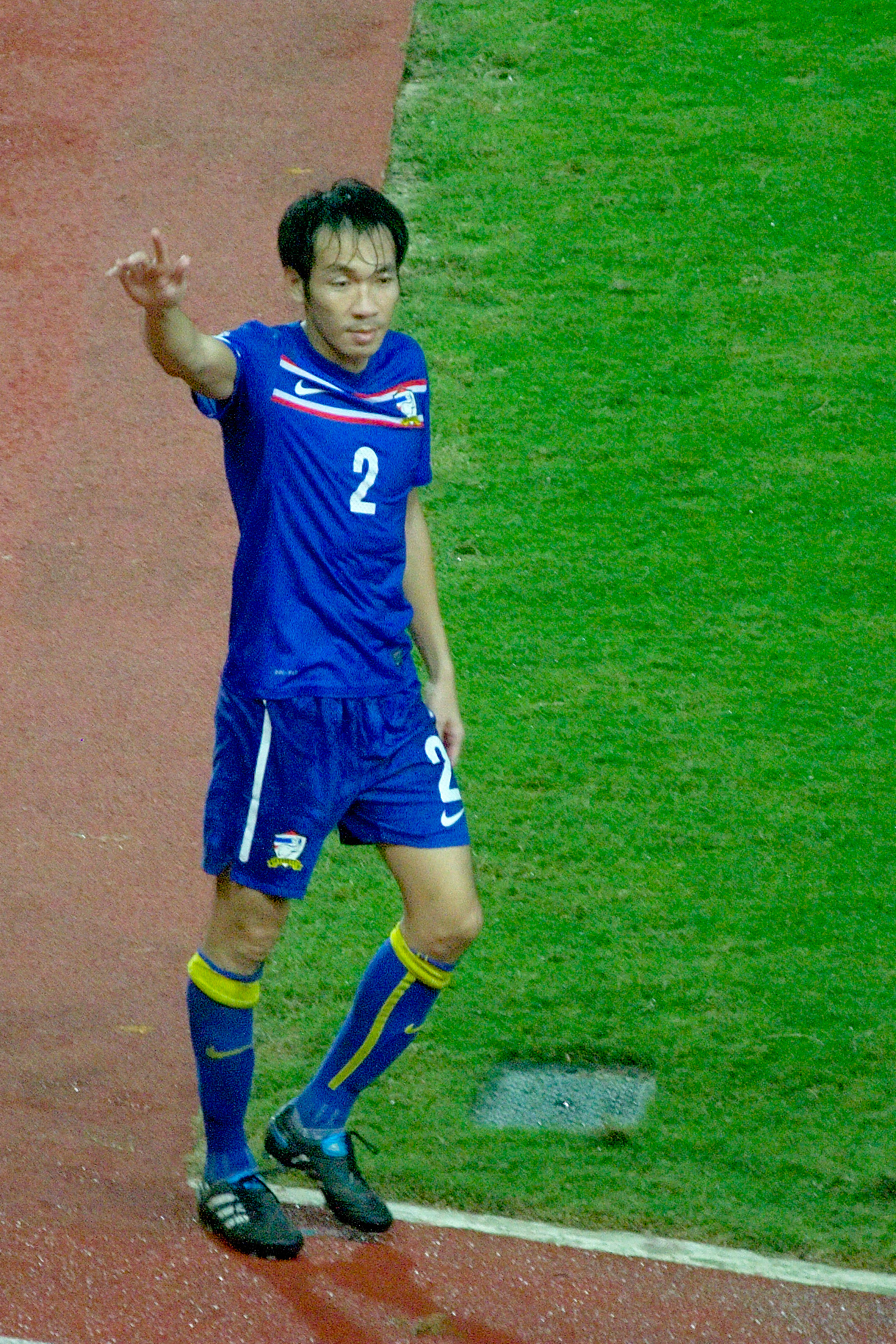

Personal information
- Full name: Niweat Siriwong
- Date of birth: 18 July 1977 (age 49)
- Place of birth: Nakhon Phanom, Thailand
- Height: 1.74 m (5 ft 8 1/2 in)
- Positions: Centre back; right back

Team information
- Current team: Ayutthaya United (assistant coach)

Senior career*
Years	Team	Apps	(Gls)
1996–2000	Sinthana	97	(2)
2000	Gombak United	24	(0)
2001–2002	Sembawang Rangers	38	(4)
2004–2005	NHĐA Thép Pomina	31	(1)
2006–2007	Tien Giang	41	(3)
2008	BEC Tero Sasana	26	(0)
2009–2013	Pattaya United	63	(5)
2014–2015	Chonburi	16	(0)
2016	Ayutthaya Warrior	5	(0)
2016	Pattaya United	4	(0)
2017	Kasetsart	6	(0)
2018	Pattana	5	(1)
Total		356	(16)

International career
1997–2012	Thailand	87	(2)

Managerial career
- 2024–: Ayutthaya United (assistant)
Medal record
Thailand
Asean Football Championship
Winner	Tiger Cup 2000	2000
Runner-up	ASEAN Football Championship 2007	2007
Runner-up	AFF Suzuki Cup 2008	2008
Runner-up	AFF Suzuki Cup 2012	2012
- * Club domestic league appearances and goals

Niweat Siriwong (Thai: นิเวศ ศิริวงศ์, born 18 July 1977) is a Thai football coach and former player, who is the assistant coach of Ayutthaya United. Niweat is a vastly experienced player and has played overseas in Singapore and Vietnam during his career. He was known for his long-range powerful free kicks.

== Honours ==
International
Thailand

- AFF Championship: 2000. Runner-up (3): 2007, 2008, 2012
- T&T Cup: 2008

Clubs

Sinthana

- Thai Premier League: Champion (1998). Runner-up (1997)
- Thai FA Cup: 1997
- Kor Royal Cup: 1997, 1998

== International career ==
Niweat captained the Thailand squad which won the 2008 T&T Cup.

He also played in the 2012 King's Cup and 2012 AFF Suzuki Cup.

== International goals ==
#	Date	Venue	Opponent	Score	Result	Competition
1.	28 May 2001	Suphachalasai Stadium, Bangkok, Thailand	Pakistan	6-0	Win	2002 FIFA World Cup Qualification
2.	17 November 2004	Rajamangala Stadium, Bangkok, Thailand	Yemen	1-1	Draw	2006 FIFA World Cup Qualification
Correct as of 13 January 2017
