= Phan Thong F.C. =

Thai football club

Phanthong พานทอง เอฟซี
- Full name: Phanthong Football Club สโมสรฟุตบอลพานทอง
- Nickname(s): The Huntsman (พรานล่าเนื้อ)
- Founded: 2013
- Ground: Institute of Physical Education Chonburi FC Training Ground; Chonburi, Thailand
- Capacity: 300

Phanthong Football Club (Thai: สโมสรฟุตบอลพานทอง) is a Thai semi professional football club based in Phan Thong District of Chonburi Province.

In 2017, Chonburi can send Chonburi B to 2017 Thai League 4 Eastern Region in Thai league system. Phanthong Football Club, which is a deservedly old Chonburi, is collapsed.

Since 2019, the management of the club has completely been changed. They play in Thai League 4 Eastern Region again.

== Stadium and locations ==
Coordinates	Location	Stadium	Capacity	Year
13°24′41″N 100°59′37″E	Chonburi	Institute of Physical Education Chonburi FC Training Ground	300	2019

== Season By Season record ==
Season	League									FA Cup	League Cup	Top goalscorer	
Season	Division	P	W	D	L	F	A	Pts	Pos	FA Cup	League Cup	Name	Goals
2013	Central-East	26	7	2	17	41	58	23	12th				
2014	Central-East	26	7	2	17	35	60	23	11th	R1			
2015	Central-East	26	7	4	15	47	59	25	11th	R3	R1		
2016	Central	20	4	5	11	14	27	17	9th	R1	1st Qualification		
2017–2018	collapsed												
2019	T4 East	28	2	6	20	17	66	12	8th	Not Enter	Not Enter	(Thailand) Archawit Khomhongsa	3

Champion	Runner	Promoted	Relegated
