= 2016 Regional League Division 2 Central Region =

Regional League Central Region
- Season: 2016
- Champions: Ayutthaya Warrior
- Relegated: Uthai Thani Forest
- Matches: 110
- Goals: 233 (2.12 per match)
- Top goalscorer: Ousmanou Mohamadou (14 Goals)
- Biggest home win: Singburi 4–1 PTU (4 June 2016)
- Biggest away win: Chaiyaphum 0–3 Saraburi TRU (14 May 2016)
- Highest scoring: Ayutthaya Warrior 4–3 Uthai Thani (2 July 2016)
- Longest winning run: 9 Matches; Ayutthaya
- Longest unbeaten run: 10 Matches; Ayutthaya
- Longest losing run: 5 Matches; Chaiyaphum
- Highest attendance: 1,739; Ayutthaya Warrior 2–0 Ayutthaya (30 July 2016)
- Lowest attendance: 40; Uthai Thani 1–3 Ayutthaya (5 June 2016)
- Total attendance: 50,131
- Average attendance: 477

2016 Regional League Division 2 Central Region is the 1st season of the League competition since its establishment in 2016. It is in the third tier of the Thai football league system. The league winners and runners up will qualify for the 2016 Regional League Division 2 champions league round. This zone is broken from 2015 Thai Division 2 League Central & Eastern Region and 2015 Thai Division 2 League Central & Western Region

== Changes from last season ==
=== Break zone clubs ===
- PTU Pathum Thani Seeker is broken from Central & Western Region
- Saraburi TRU and Phan Thong are broken from Central & Eastern Region

=== Relegated clubs ===
- Ayutthaya were relegated from the 2015 Thai Division 1 League.

=== Moved clubs ===
- Chaiyaphum were moved from the North Eastern Region.
- Nakhon Sawan, Singburi and Uthai Thani Forest were moved from the Northern Region.
- Phichit were moved from the Northern Region.

=== Expansion clubs ===
- Ayutthaya United Promoted from Khǒr Royal Cup (ถ้วย ข.) runner-up 2015
- Ayutthaya Warrior authorize from Phichit.

=== Renamed clubs ===
- Kaeng Khoi TRU renamed Saraburi TRU
- PTU Pathum Thani Seeker renamed PTU Pathum Thani

=== Returning clubs ===
Paknampho NSRU and Uthai Thani Forest are returning to the league after a 1-year break.

== Stadium and locations ==
Locations of the Regional League Central Teams

Team	Location	Stadium	Capacity	Ref.
Ayutthaya	Ayutthaya	Rajamangala University of Technology Suvarnabhumi (Hantra)	?	
Ayutthaya United	Ayutthaya	Senabordee Stadium	2,500	
Ayutthaya Warrior	Ayutthaya	Ayutthaya Province Stadium	6,000	
Mashare Chaiyaphum	Chaiyaphum	IPE Chaiyaphum Stadium Chaiyaphum Province Stadium	1,957 ?	
Nakhon Sawan	Nakhon Sawan	Nakhon Sawan Province Stadium	15,000	
Paknampho NSRU	Nakhon Sawan	Nakhon Sawan Sport School Stadium	?	
Phan Thong	Chonburi	IPE Chonburi Stadium	12,000	
PTU Pathum Thani	Pathum Thani	Valaya Alongkorn Rajabhat University Stadium	1,000	
Saraburi TRU	Saraburi	Saraburi Province Central Stadium	6,000	
Singburi Bang Rachan	Singburi	Singburi Province Stadium	?	
Uthai Thani Forest	Uthai Thani	Uthai Thani Province Stadium	4,500	

Football clubs in Bangkok Metropolitan Region

== League table ==
Pos	Team	Pld	W	D	L	GF	GA	GD	Pts	Promotion or relegation
1	Ayutthaya Warrior (C, Q)	20	14	4	2	38	17	+21	46	Qualification to Champions League Round and Promotion to Thai League Championship
2	Ayutthaya (Q)	20	13	3	4	27	11	+16	42	Qualification to Champions League Round and Promotion to Thai League Championship
3	Singburi Bang Rachan (P)	20	13	2	5	40	22	+18	41	Promotion to Thai League Championship
4	Ayutthaya United (P)	20	8	7	5	19	15	+4	31	Promotion to Thai League Championship
5	Paknampho NSRU	20	8	4	8	20	17	+3	28	
6	Nakhon Sawan	20	5	9	6	16	21	−5	24	
7	PTU Pathum Thani Seeker	20	6	5	9	17	24	−7	23	
8	Saraburi TRU	20	5	5	10	19	24	−5	20	
9	Phan Thong	20	4	5	11	14	27	−13	17	
10	Mashare Chaiyaphum	20	3	6	11	13	27	−14	15	
11	Uthai Thani Forest (R)	20	2	8	10	11	29	−18	14	Relegation to Thai Football Division 3

Source: Division 2
Rules for classification: 1) points; 2) head-to-head points; 3) head-to-head goal difference; 4) head-to-head goals scored; 5) goal difference; 6) number of goals scored.
(C) Champions; (P) Promoted; (Q) Qualified for the phase indicated; (R) Relegated

== Results ==
Home \ Away	AYU	AYUU	AYW	MCH	NAS	PNS	PT	PPS	STR	SIN	UTF
Ayutthaya		1–1	1–0	4–0	3–0	1–0	1–0	1–1	1–3	2–0	2–0
Ayutthaya United	1–0		1–1	1–0	1–0	1–1	0–0	2–0	1–1	1–1	1–0
Ayutthaya Warrior	2–0	3–1		3–0	1–1	2–1	2–0	2–0	1–0	2–2	4–3
Mashare Chaiyaphum	0–1	1–2	0–0		0–0	1–0	1–1	1–2	0–3	1–2	2–1
Nakhon Sawan	0–0	0–1	1–2	0–0		0–0	2–1	1–1	1–0	1–4	1–1
Paknampho NSRU	0–1	1–0	0–1	2–1	1–2		1–0	0–2	2–0	2–1	3–0
Phan Thong	0–2	1–3	1–4	1–0	2–2	0–3		1–1	2–0	2–0	0–1
PTU Pathum Thani Seeker	0–1	1–0	0–1	0–2	0–1	1–2	0–0		1–0	2–1	1–1
Saraburi TRU	1–2	1–0	2–4	1–1	0–1	0–0	1–2	3–1		1–3	0–0
Singburi Bang Rachan	1–0	1–0	3–1	2–1	3–2	3–1	2–0	4–1	1–2		3–0
Uthai Thani Forest	1–3	1–1	0–2	1–1	0–0	0–0	1–0	0–2	0–0	0–3	

Updated to match(es) played on 3 September 2016. Source: Division 2
Legend: Blue = home team win; Yellow = draw; Red = away team win.

== Season statistics ==
=== Top scorers ===
As of 3 September 2016.

Rank	Player	Club	Goals
1	(Cameroon) Ousmanou Mohamadou	Singburi Bang Rachan	14
2	(South Korea) Kim Ji-hun	Ayutthaya Warrior	13
3	(Thailand) Ratchanat Arunyapairoj	Singburi Bang Rachan	8
4	(South Korea) Joo Sung-hwan	Ayutthaya Warrior	6
4	(Nigeria) Akinkumi Oyedobe	Saraburi TRU	6
6	(South Korea) Kim Myung-gyu	Ayutthaya	5
6	(South Korea) Jang Gyu-hyeon	Singburi Bang Rachan	5
6	(Thailand) Sahakorn Na Nonchai	Paknampho NSRU	5
9	(Thailand) Pisanu Ngamsaguan	Ayutthaya	4
9	(Japan) Tomohiro Onodera	Ayutthaya United	4
9	(Thailand) Panuwat Promyen	Ayutthaya Warrior	4
9	(Thailand) Sarun Sridech	Ayutthaya Warrior	4
9	(Thailand) Sirichai Lumputtha	Ayutthaya	4
9	(Guinea) Magassouba Seydou	Singburi Bang Rachan	4
9	(Cameroon) Stephane Landry	Nakhon Sawan	4

== Attendances ==
Pos	Team	Total	High	Low	Average	Change
1	Ayutthaya Warrior	11,032	1,739	500	1,103	n/a
2	Ayutthaya	6,307	1,200	200	630	n/a
3	Mashare Chaiyaphum	6,092	1,562	200	609	n/a
4	Ayutthaya United	4,831	1,000	230	536	n/a
5	Saraburi TRU	4,473	1,112	185	497	n/a
6	Paknampho NSRU	3,754	850	250	417	n/a
7	Nakhon Sawan	4,098	1,174	153	409	n/a
8	Singburi Bang Rachan	3,447	500	247	383	n/a
9	Uthai Thani Forest	2,004	650	40	222	n/a
10	Phan Thong	2,092	375	120	209	n/a
11	PTU Pathum Thani Seeker	2,001	420	86	200	n/a
	League total	50,131	1,739	40	477	n/a

Updated to games played on 28 August 2016
Source: Division 2

== See also ==
- 2016 Thai Premier League
- 2016 Thai Division 1 League
- 2016 Regional League Division 2
- 2016 Thai FA Cup
- 2016 Thai League Cup
- 2016 Kor Royal Cup
