= Ayutthaya Warrior F.C. =

Ayutthaya Warrior อยุธยา วอริเออร์
- Full name: Ayutthaya Warrior Football Club สโมสรฟุตบอลอยุธยา วอริเออร์
- Nicknames: Ayothaya Warrior (นักรบอโยธยา)
- Founded: 2016
- Dissolved: 2017
- Ground: Ayutthaya Province Stadium; Ayutthaya, Thailand
- Capacity: 6,000

Ayutthaya Warrior Football Club (Thai: สโมสรฟุตบอลอยุธยา วอริเออร์) is a defunct Thailand football club based in Ayutthaya province. In 2016 the club participates in Regional League Division 2 (Central Region) the third tier of Thai football league system.

The club borrowed a league status of Phichit to join Regional League Division 2. In 2017 the team collapsed to combine with Ayutthaya United and dissolved Ayutthaya Warrior.

== Stadium and locations ==
Coordinates	Location	Stadium	Capacity	Year
14°21′00″N 100°35′50″E	Ayutthaya	Ayutthaya Province Stadium	6,000	2016

== Season By Season Record ==
Season	League									FA Cup	League Cup	Top goalscorer	
Season	Division	P	W	D	L	F	A	Pts	Pos	FA Cup	League Cup	Name	Goals
2016	Central	20	14	4	2	38	17	46	Champion	R2	R2	Kim Ji-hun	13

Champion	Runner	Promoted	Relegated

== Honours ==
- Regional League Central Division
  - Winners (1): 2016
