= Pattaya F.C. =

Thai football club

Pattaya พัทยา
- Full name: Pattaya Football Club สโมสรฟุตบอล พัทยา
- Nickname(s): Praya Warlord (ขุนศึกทัพพระยา)
- Founded: 1987; 38 years ago
- Ground: Nong Prue Stadium; Chonburi, Thailand
- Capacity: 5,500
- Owner: Nathaphon Panyakhananukul
- League: Thai League T4
- 2016: 4

Pattaya Football Club is a new Thai football club based in Pattaya, Chonburi. Established in 1987. Playing in Thai League T4. The Club-licensing football club didn't pass to play 2018 Thai League 4 Eastern Region. This team is banned 2 years and Relegated to 2020 Thailand Amateur League Eastern Region.

== Stadium and locations ==
Coordinates	Location	Stadium	Capacity	Year
12°55′28″N 100°56′14″E	Chonburi	Nong Prue 1 Stadium	?	2016–2017

== Record ==
Season	League									FA Cup	League Cup	Top goalscorer	
Season	Division	P	W	D	L	F	A	Pts	Pos	FA Cup	League Cup	Name	Goals
2016	DIV 2 Bangkok & Eastern	18	5	4	9	16	35	19	7th	Not Enter	QR1		
2017	T4 East	27	7	7	13	38	41	28	8th	Not Enter	QR1	Dawda Dibba	20
2018–2019	Banned 2 years from Club-licensing don't pass												
2020	TA East												

Champions	Runners-up	Promoted	Relegated
