= Pattana F.C. =

Thai football club

Pattana พัฒนา
- Full name: Pattana Football Club สโมสรฟุตบอลพัฒนา
- Founded: 2014; 11 years ago
- Ground: Pattana Stadium; Chonburi, Thailand
- League: 2019 Thailand Amateur League Eastern Region
- Website: https://www.pattanafc.com

Pattana Football Club (Thai สโมสรฟุตบอลพัฒนา), is a Thai football club based in Chonburi, Thailand. The club is currently playing in the Thailand Amateur League Eastern Region.

== Record ==
Season	League									FA Cup	League Cup	Top goalscorer	
Season	Division	P	W	D	L	F	A	Pts	Pos	FA Cup	League Cup	Name	Goals
2016	DIV 3 East	3	2	0	1	7	6	6	9th – 16th	Not Enter	Can't Enter		
2017	TA East	6	4	2	0	20	8	14	2nd	Not Enter	Can't Enter		
2018	TA East	1	0	1	0	3	5	1	20th – 22nd	Not Enter	Can't Enter	Prachak Sribula; Niweat Siriwong; Thammawat Trilam	1
2019	TA East	5	3	1	1	22	3	10					

Champions	Runners-up	Promoted	Relegated
