= Na-Me United F.C. =

Thai football club

Na-Me United นาเม่ ยูไนเต็ด
- Full name: Na-Me United Football Club นาเม่ ยูไนเต็ด
- Founded: 2015; 10 years ago
- Ground: ? Bangkok, Thailand
- League: 2016 Thai Division 3 Tournament Eastern Region

Na-Me United Football Club (Thai นาเม่ ยูไนเต็ด), is a Thai football club based in Bangkok, Thailand. The club is currently playing in the Thai Football Division 3.

== Record ==
Season	League									FA Cup	League Cup	Top goalscorer	
Season	Division	P	W	D	L	F	A	Pts	Pos	FA Cup	League Cup	Name	Goals
2016	DIV 3 East												

Champions	Runners-up	Promoted	Relegated
