= TA Benchamarachuthit F.C. =

Thai football club

TA Benchamarachuthit F.C. ทีเอ เบญจมราชูทิศ
- Full name: TA Benchamarachuthit Football Club สโมสรฟุตบอล ทีเอ เบญจมราชูทิศ
- Nickname(s): Blue and Yellow
- Founded: 2016; 9 years ago
- Ground: Rambhai Barni Rajabhat University field, Chanthaburi, Thailand
- Chairman: Phimdech Amornsukhon
- Manager: Panya Kanjaroen
- League: Regional League Division 2

TA Benchamarachuthit Football Club (Thai ทีเอ เบญจมราชูทิศ) is a Thai semi-professional football club based in Tha Chang District of Chanthaburi Province. They currently play in Regional League Division 2 Central & Eastern in 2016.

== Stadium and locations ==
Coordinates	Location	Stadium	Year
12°39′50″N 102°06′06″E	Chanthaburi	Rambhai Barni Rajabhat University Stadium	2016

== Season By Season Record ==
Season	League									FA Cup	League Cup	Top goalscorer	
Season	Division	P	W	D	L	F	A	Pts	Pos	FA Cup	League Cup	Name	Goals
2016	East									R1	Last Qualification		
2017	DIV 3 East	Suspended											

Champion	Runner	Promoted	Relegated
