= Ousmanou Mohamadou =

Cameroonian footballer

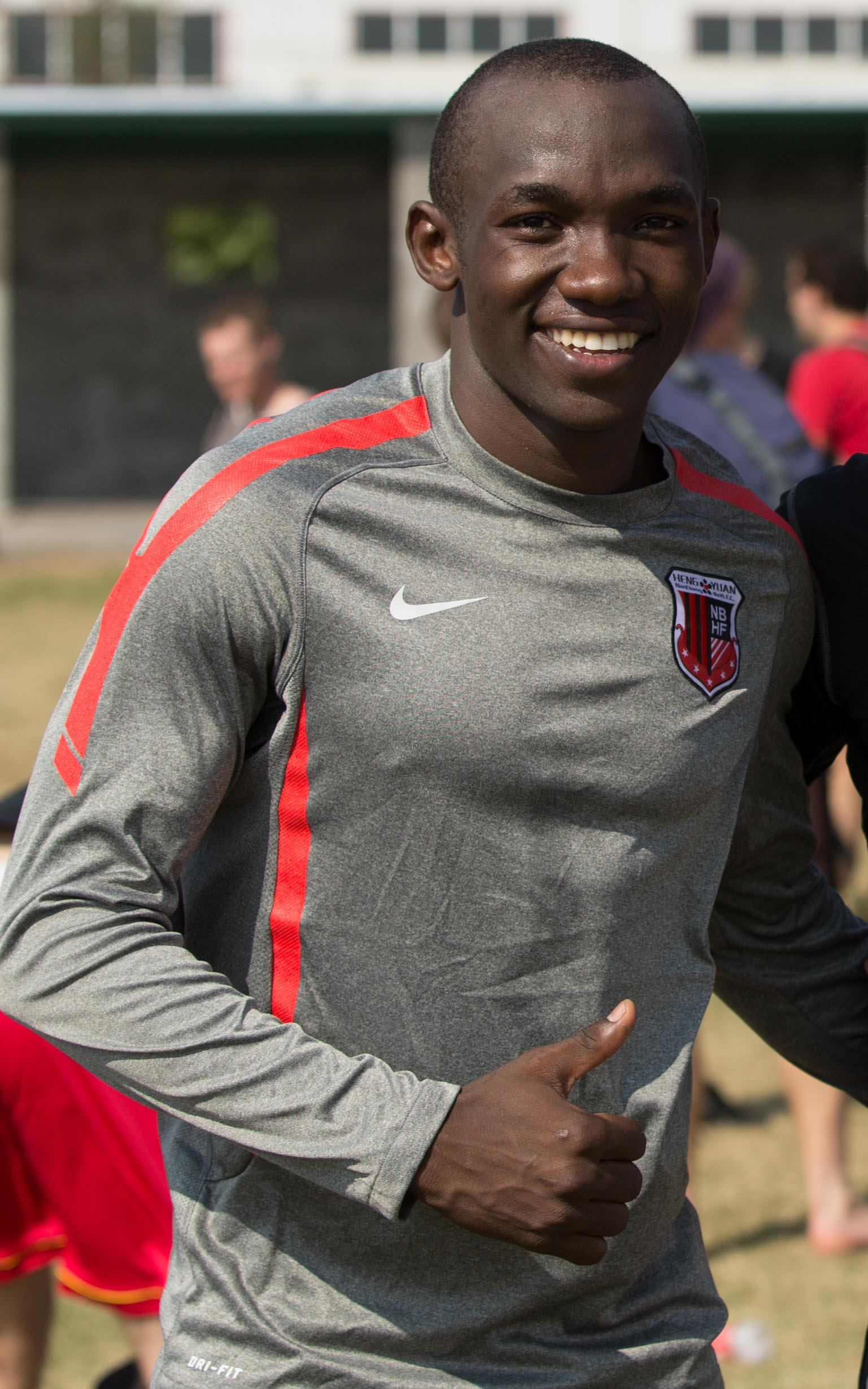
- After match celebration

Personal information
- Position: Striker

Senior career*
Years	Team	Apps	(Gls)
2008	Phnom Penh Crown FC	23	(18)
2013	Ubon Ratchathani	26	(13)
- * Club domestic league appearances and goals

Ousmanou Mohamadou is a Cameroonian professional football striker.

== Club career ==
=== Phnom Penh ===
In early 2008 the 19-year-old Cameroonian striker was signed by Cambodian side Phnom Penh Crown FC for which he scored 18 goals in 23 appearances and gave 5 assists. It was Phnom Penh's most successful season ever with winning the league and cup title. On 7 September 2009 Mohamadou scored a hattrick in Phnom Penh's stunning 6:3 win over Spark

=== Ubon Ratchathani ===
In 2013 Mohamadou moved to Ubon UMT for which he scored 13 goals and 8 assists in 26 appearances in the 2013 Thai Division 2 League North Eastern Region.

=== Australia ===
Mohamadou currently plays for Grange Soccer Club in the South Australian Amateur Soccer League.
