= Chonburi B F.C. =

Thai football club

Chonburi B ชลบุรี บี
- Full name: Chonburi Football Club B สโมสรฟุตบอลจังหวัดชลบุรี บี
- Nickname(s): The Sharks (team) (ฉลามชล); Blue Blood (supporters)
- Founded: 2017; 8 years ago
- Ground: Chonburi Stadium, Mueang Chonburi, Chonburi, Thailand
- Capacity: 8,680
- Chairman: Wittaya Khunpluem
- Head Coach: vacant
- League: Thai League 4
Home colours	Away colours	Third colours

Chonburi B Football Club (Thai: ชลบุรี บี) is the reserve team of Chonburi they play in the Thai League 4 Eastern Region.

== Stadium and locations for team B ==
Coordinates	Location	Stadium	Capacity	Year
13°20′11″N 100°57′23″E	Chonburi	Chonburi Stadium	8,680	2017

== Season by season record for team B ==
Season	League									Top goalscorer	
Season	Division	P	W	D	L	F	A	Pts	Pos	Name	Goals
2017	T4 East	27	11	9	7	46	34	42	5th	Pipob On-Mo	7
2018	T4 East										

== Players ==
=== Current squad ===
Note: Flags indicate national team as defined under FIFA eligibility rules; some limited exceptions apply. Players may hold more than one non-FIFA nationality.

No.	Pos.	Nation	Player
—	DF	(Thailand) THA	Kittitach Praniti
—	MF	(Thailand) THA	Jadsada Hongsawong
—	MF	(Laos) LAO	Phathana Phommathep
