= Nong Prue 2 Stadium =

Coordinates: 12.925035°N 100.948071°E

- Interactive map of Nong Prue 2 Stadium
- Location: Pattaya, Bang Lamung, Chonburi, Thailand
- Owner: Nong Prue Municipality
- Operator: Nong Prue Municipality
- Capacity: 6,000
- Surface: Grass

Nong Prue 2 Stadium (Thai: สนามกีฬาหนองปรือ 2) also known as Nongprue Municipality 2 Stadium (Thai: สนามเทศบาลหนองปรือ 2) is a Stadium in Pattaya, Chonburi, Thailand. It is currently used mostly for football matches. The stadium holds 6,000 people.

== See also ==
- Nong Prue Stadium
