= Pratya Narach =

Thai footballer (born 1989)

Personal information
- Full name: Pratya Narach
- Date of birth: 9 January 1989 (age 37)
- Place of birth: Chanthaburi, Thailand
- Height: 1.77 m (5 ft 9 1/2 in)
- Position: Attacking midfielder

Team information
- Current team: Lamphun Warrior

Senior career*
Years	Team	Apps	(Gls)
2010	Chanthaburi		
2011–2013	Bangkok United	5	(0)
2013	→ Angthong (loan)		
2014	Paknampho NSRU		
2014	Inter Pattaya		
2015–2017	Pluakdaeng Rayong United		
2018–	Lamphun Warrior		

International career
2011–2012	Thailand U23		
- * Club domestic league appearances and goals as of 29 August 2011

Pratya Narach (born January 9, 1989) is a Thai professional footballer.
