= Royal Thai Fleet F.C. =

Thai football club

Royal Thai Fleet F.C. กองเรือยุทธการ เอฟซี
- Full name: Royal Thai Fleet Football Club กองเรือยุทธการ เอฟซี
- Nickname(s): The Battleships (เรือรบประจัญบาน)
- Founded: 2000; 25 years ago
- Ground: Sattahip Navy Stadium; Chonburi, Thailand
- Capacity: 6,000
- Chairman: Narong Tedvisarn
- Manager: Chanchai Kiawsen
- League: Thailand Amateur League
- 2021–22: Thai League 3, 12th of 12 in the Eastern region (relegated)
Home colours	Away colours

Royal Thai Fleet Football Club (Thai: สโมสรฟุตบอลกองเรือยุทธการ) is a Thailand semi-professional football club based in Chonburi Province. The club is currently playing in the Thailand Amateur League Eastern region.

== Stadium and locations ==
Coordinates	Location	Stadium	Year
12°39′39″N 100°55′24″E	Sattahip, Chonburi	Royal Thai Fleet Football Field	2007
12°39′50″N 100°56′09″E	Sattahip, Chonburi	Sattahip Navy Stadium	2011–2017

== Season By Season record ==
Season	League									FA Cup	League Cup	Top goalscorer	
Season	Division	P	W	D	L	F	A	Pts	Pos	FA Cup	League Cup	Name	Goals
2011	Bangkok	30	5	11	14	19	34	26	14th				
2012	Central-East	34	6	12	16	23	36	30	15th				
2013	Central-East	26	9	9	8	32	31	36	9th				
2014	Central-East	26	8	11	7	35	31	35	7th				
2015	Central-East	26	2	12	12	33	50	18	14th	R2	QR1		
2016	Bangkok-East	18	4	5	9	14	26	17	9th	QR	QR2		
2017	T4 East	27	10	13	4	39	25	43	4th	R1	QR1	(Thailand) Wuttichai Asusheewa	12
2018	T4 East	27	10	10	7	29	27	40	4th	R1	QR1	(Thailand) Wuttichai Asusheewa	9
2019	T4 East	28	6	6	16	32	56	24	7th	QR	QR2	(Thailand) Piansin Sha-in (Thailand) Sathaphon Panmisi	7
2020–21	T4 East	17	2	5	10	13	31	11	12th	Not enter	QR2	(Thailand) Tanachote Samart	3
2021–22	T3 East	22	4	3	15	21	49	15	12th	QR	QR1	(Thailand) Pongpeera Prachongsai	5

Champions	Runners-up	Promoted	Relegated

== Players ==
=== Current squad ===
As of 21 November 2021

Note: Flags indicate national team as defined under FIFA eligibility rules; some limited exceptions apply. Players may hold more than one non-FIFA nationality.

No.	Pos.	Nation	Player
1	GK	THA	Pongsaton Kachapol
2	DF	THA	Atthapol Punsila
3	DF	THA	Kittisak Thanthong
5	DF	THA	Panuwat Kongchan
6	MF	THA	Anurak Nonpila
7	FW	THA	Noppadon Tesaon
8	MF	THA	Thanakrit Nopparat
9	FW	THA	Jaturapat Payakkatha
10	MF	THA	Anuwat Sonchai
11	FW	THA	Likhit Sakeaw
13	FW	THA	Anuwat Hongsa
14	MF	THA	Vorakan Kavila
15	MF	THA	Wanusanun Thana
17	DF	THA	Chawalit Waenthong
18	MF	THA	Tanachote Samart
19	MF	THA	Pattarapol Duangkamchanachai

No.	Pos.	Nation	Player
22	DF	THA	Kitsana Hongweangjan
24	DF	THA	Phongpeera Prajongsai
25	FW	THA	Wuttigral Umprakhon
28	DF	THA	Sattaya Thippayapanyanukul
29	DF	THA	Worawut Kotchada
30	GK	THA	Boriruck Kamnordsing
31	DF	THA	Woramet Chaisin
35	GK	THA	Natthawut Noitamyae
36	MF	THA	Panuwat Kongchan
43	MF	THA	Pannathon Prasitthiwet
45	MF	THA	Assarin Norrapa
56	MF	THA	Aphisid Sapphaso
71	DF	THA	Kroekpol Chaoenkit
82	FW	THA	Anuruk Buajaroon
99	FW	THA	Jessadangvit Phlailaharn

== Honours ==
- Khǒr Royal Cup (ถ้วย ข.)
  - Runner-up : 2009
