= 2016 Regional League Division 2 Bangkok & Eastern Region =

- Season: 2016
- Champions: Raj Pracha
- Relegated: Sinthana Kabinburi
- Matches: 89
- Goals: 241 (2.71 per match)
- Top goalscorer: Diego Barrera (10 Goals)
- Biggest home win: Customs United 7–0 Pattaya (29 July 2016)
- Biggest away win: Pattaya 0–6 Raj Pracha (5 August 2016)
- Highest scoring: Banbung United 6–3 Pathum Thani (24 July 2016)
- Longest winning run: 3 Matches; Raj Pracha; Samut Prakan United
- Longest unbeaten run: 9 Matches; Banbung United
- Longest losing run: 4 Matches; Pathum Thani United

2016 Regional League Division 2 Bangkok & Eastern Region is the 1st season of the League competition since its establishment in 2016. It is in the third tier of the Thai football league system. The league winners and runners up will qualify for the 2016 Regional League Division 2 champions league round. This zone is new zone.

== Changes from last season ==
=== Banned and relegated clubs ===
- Inter Pattaya withdrew from the league after 4 games. They were accused of owing unpaid wages to players in 2015, the Football Association of Thailand Regional League part to banned 2 years and will relegate to play Division 3 on Bangkok & Eastern zone 2018 seasons. This is full paper judgement

=== Team changes ===
==== Returning clubs ====
- Look Isan and Samut Prakan United are returning to the league after a 1-year break.

==== Renamed clubs ====
- Pakchong United renamed Look Isan

=== Relocated clubs ===
- Pathum Thani United and Royal Thai Fleet re-located to the Regional League Bangkok & Eastern Division from the Central & Eastern Division 2015.
- Kasem Bundit University and Customs United re-located to the Regional League Bangkok & field Division from the Bangkok & field Division 2015.
- Raj Pracha re-located to the Regional League Central & Western Division from the Central & Western Division 2015.

=== Expansion clubs ===
Sinthana Kabinburi, Inter Pattaya, Pattaya and Banbung United Renamed from Laem Chabang City joined the newly expanded league setup.

==== Withdrawn clubs ====
Inter Pattaya club withdrew after played 4 games in 2016

== Stadium and locations ==
Locations of the 2016 Regional League Division 2 League Bangkok & Eastern Region Teams

Team	Location	Stadium	Capacity	Ref.
Banbueng United	Chonburi	Banbueng municipality Stadium	2,500	
Customs United	Samut Prakan	Lad Krabang 54 Stadium	2,000	
Kasem Bundit University	Min Buri Bangkok	Kasem Bundit University Stadium (Rom Klao)	?	
Look Isan	Bangkok	Ramkhamhaeng University Stadium	2,000	
Pathum Thani United	Pathum Thani	IPE Bangkok Stadium	2,000	
Pattaya	Chonburi	Nong Prue 1 Stadium	5,500	
Raj Pracha	Bangkok	King Mongkut's Institute of Technology Ladkrabang Stadium	3,500	
Royal Thai Fleet	Chonburi	Sattahip Navy Stadium	12,500	
Samut Prakan United	Samut Prakan	Lam Fah Pha municipality Stadium	1,000	
Sinthana Kabinburi	Prachinburi	Sahapat Group Kabinburi Football Field	?	

Football clubs in Bangkok Metropolitan Region

== League table ==
Pos	Team	Pld	W	D	L	GF	GA	GD	Pts	Promotion or relegation
1	Raj Pracha (C, Q)	18	11	4	3	27	5	+22	37	Qualification to Champions League Round and Promotion to Thai League Championship
2	Customs United (Q)	18	9	6	3	34	13	+21	33	Qualification to Champions League Round and Promotion to Thai League Championship
3	Banbung United (P)	18	9	5	4	30	19	+11	32	Promotion to Thai League Championship
4	Kasem Bundit University (P)	18	8	6	4	32	24	+8	30	Promotion to Thai League Championship
5	Look Isan	18	5	9	4	25	24	+1	24	
6	Samut Prakan United	18	6	4	8	26	31	−5	22	
7	Pattaya	18	5	4	9	16	35	−19	19	
8	Pathum Thani United	18	4	5	9	22	35	−13	17 (Note: PTU 1–0 RTF ; RTF 2–2 PTU)	
9	Royal Thai Fleet	18	4	5	9	14	26	−12	17	
10	Sinthana Kabinburi (R)	18	4	2	12	15	29	−14	14	Relegation to Thai Football Division 3

Rules for classification: 1) points; 2) head-to-head points; 3) head-to-head goal difference; 4) head-to-head goals scored; 5) goal difference; 6) number of goals scored.
(C) Champions; (P) Promoted; (Q) Qualified for the phase indicated; (R) Relegated

== Results ==
Home \ Away	BBU	CUSU	KBU	LI	PTU	PAT	RP	RTF	SPU	SK
Banbung United		1–1	0–0	1–1	6–3	0–0	2–1	2–0	1–1	2–0
Customs United	3–1		4–2	1–1	3–0	7–0	0–0	0–2	5–0	0–0
Kasem Bundit University	2–1	0–1		2–3	3–0	5–2	1–0	1–0	4–1	2–1
Look Isan	1–2	1–1	1–1		2–2	1–0	0–1	2–2	2–1	0–1
Pathum Thani United	1–3	2–1	3–3	2–2		0–1	0–0	1–0	1–2	0–2
Pattaya	2–1	1–1	0–1	2–4	2–0		0–6	1–1	0–1	1–0
Raj Pracha	0–1	2–0	3–1	0–0	1–0	4–0		1–0	2–0	4–0
Royal Thai Fleet	0–2	0–3	1–1	1–1	2–2	1–0	0–1		1–0	3–2
Samut Prakan United	3–2	0–2	2–2	3–1	2–4	1–1	0–0	3–0		4–0
Sinthana Kabinburi	0–2	0–1	1–1	1–2	0–1	1–3	0–1	3–0	3–2	

Updated to match(es) played on 3 September 2016. Source: Division 2
Legend: Blue = home team win; Yellow = draw; Red = away team win.

== Season statistics ==
=== Top scorers ===
As of 3 September 2016.

Rank	Player	Club	Goals
1	(Colombia) Diego Barrera	Kasem Bundit University	10
2	(Iran) Farivar Torabi	Banbung United	9
3	(Brazil) Fabricio Peris Carneiro	Customs United	7
3	(Thailand) Nakhon Ngrntoum	Sinthana Kabinburi	7
3	(Thailand) Taned Benpard	Banbung United	7
3	(Thailand) Arnon Buspha	Customs United	7
3	(Guinea) Almamy Sylla	Look Isan	7
8	(Thailand) Kittiphop Upachakham	Samut Prakan United	5
8	(Ghana) Otis Adjei Darfo	Pathum Thani United	5
8	(Ivory Coast) Zalla Abdoukwu	Raj Pracha	5
8	(Thailand) Teerayut Ngamlamai	Customs United	5

== See also ==
- 2016 Thai Premier League
- 2016 Thai Division 1 League
- 2016 Regional League Division 2
- 2016 Thai FA Cup
- 2016 Thai League Cup
- 2016 Kor Royal Cup
