= 2016 Thai Division 3 Tournament Eastern Region =

2016 Thai Football Division 3 Tournament Eastern Region is the 1st season of the League competition since its establishment in 2016. It is in the fourth tier of the Thai football league system.

== Venue Stadium and locations (2016) ==
All matches played in Chonburi

Coordinates	Location	Stadium	Capacity
13°24′45″N 100°59′32″E	Chonburi	Chon Buri Sport School Artificial turf Football Field	?

== Member clubs ==
Section	Club	Province	Years
1	ACDC	Chonburi	2016
1	Navanakorn	Pathum Thani	2016
1	Assumption College Sriracha	Chonburi	2016
2	Na-Me United	Bangkok	2016
2	Siriroj	Chonburi	2016
2	Khaobaisri	Rayong	2016
3	Traf Maptaphut	Rayong	2016
3	Bankhai United	Rayong	2016
3	Takhiantia	Chonburi	2016
4	Hakka Association of Thailand	Bangkok	2016
4	Kohkwang Subdistrict Municipality	Chanthaburi	2016
4	Pattana	Chonburi	2016
5	Rayong City	Rayong	2016
5	Isan Pattaya	Chonburi	2016
5	Banbung Rovers	Chonburi	2016
6	Sansuk Municipality Meangkanyang	Chonburi	2016
6	Pak Chong City	Nakhon Ratchasima	2016
6	Bangpakong Sports Association	Chachoengsao	2016
7	Institute of Physical Education Chonburi	Chonburi	2016
7	Pattaya City Club	Chonburi	2016
7	Salaeng Subdistrict Municipality	Chanthaburi	2016

== Format ==
Group stage: A total 21 clubs will be divided into four groups of three clubs except group 7 which has four clubs to play round-robin matches at a neutral venue. The best clubs of group A and G qualify to Quarter-finals round of the knock-out stage. The best two clubs of group B, C, D, E, F and runner-up of group A and G will qualify to Second round of the knock-out stage.

Knock-out stage: A total of 14 clubs which has qualified from the group stage will play single-elimination stage until there are only two finalists of the tournament.

== First round ==
=== Group A ===
Pos	Team	Pld	W	D	L	GF	GA	GD	Pts	Qualification or relegation
1	ACDC	2	2	0	0	9	1	+8	6	Qualification to Quarter-finals Round
2	Assumption College Sriracha	2	1	0	1	5	8	−3	3	Qualification to Second Round
3	Navanakorn	2	0	0	2	3	8	−5	0	

Updated to match(es) played on unknown. Source: Thai Division 3
Rules for classification: 1) points; 2) goal difference; 3) number of goals scored.

15 December 2016	ACDC	4 - 0	Navanakorn	Chonburi
13:00 (UTC+7)				Stadium: Chon Buri Sport School Artificial turf Football Field

17 December 2016	Assumption College Sriracha	4 - 3	Navanakorn	Chonburi
15:00 (UTC+7)				Stadium: Chon Buri Sport School Artificial turf Football Field

19 December 2016	ACDC	5 - 1	Assumption College Sriracha	Chonburi
15:00 (UTC+7)				Stadium: Chon Buri Sport School Artificial turf Football Field

=== Group B ===
Pos	Team	Pld	W	D	L	GF	GA	GD	Pts	Qualification or relegation
1	Na-Me United	2	1	1	0	3	2	+1	4	Qualification to Second Round
2	Khaobaisri	2	1	0	1	1	1	0	3	Qualification to Second Round
3	Siriroj	2	0	1	1	2	3	−1	1	

Updated to match(es) played on unknown. Source: Thai Division 3
Rules for classification: 1) points; 2) goal difference; 3) number of goals scored.

15 December 2016	Na-Me United	2 - 2	Siriroj	Chonburi
15:00 (UTC+7)				Stadium: Chon Buri Sport School Artificial turf Football Field

17 December 2016	Khaobaisri	1 - 0	Siriroj	Chonburi
17:00 (UTC+7)				Stadium: Chon Buri Sport School Artificial turf Football Field

20 December 2016	Na-Me United	1 - 0	Khaobaisri	Chonburi
13:00 (UTC+7)				Stadium: Chon Buri Sport School Artificial turf Football Field

=== Group C ===
Pos	Team	Pld	W	D	L	GF	GA	GD	Pts	Qualification or relegation
1	Traf Maptaphut	2	2	0	0	7	1	+6	6	Qualification to Second Round
2	Bankhai United	2	1	0	1	9	2	+7	3	Qualification to Second Round
3	Takhiantia	2	0	0	2	2	15	−13	0	

Updated to match(es) played on unknown. Source: Thai Division 3
Rules for classification: 1) points; 2) goal difference; 3) number of goals scored.

15 December 2016	Traf Maptaphut	1 - 0	Bankhai United	Chonburi
17:00 (UTC+7)				Stadium: Chon Buri Sport School Artificial turf Football Field

18 December 2016	Bankhai United	9 - 1	Takhiantia	Chonburi
13:00 (UTC+7)				Stadium: Chon Buri Sport School Artificial turf Football Field

20 December 2016	Traf Maptaphut	6 - 1	Takhiantia	Chonburi
15:00 (UTC+7)				Stadium: Chon Buri Sport School Artificial turf Football Field

=== Group D ===
Pos	Team	Pld	W	D	L	GF	GA	GD	Pts	Qualification or relegation
1	Pattana	2	2	0	0	6	3	+3	6	Qualification to Second Round
2	Hakka Association of Thailand (drew in 2nd position)	2	0	1	1	2	3	−1	1	Qualification to Second Round
3	Kohkwang Subdistrict Municipality (drew in 3rd position)	2	0	1	1	3	5	−2	1	

Updated to match(es) played on unknown. Source: Thai Division 3
Rules for classification: 1) points; 2) goal difference; 3) number of goals scored.

16 December 2016	Kohkwang Subdistrict Municipality	1 - 1	Hakka Association of Thailand	Chonburi
13:00 (UTC+7)				Stadium: Chon Buri Sport School Artificial turf Football Field

18 December 2016	Pattana	4 - 2	Kohkwang Subdistrict Municipality	Chonburi
15:00 (UTC+7)				Stadium: Chon Buri Sport School Artificial turf Football Field

20 December 2016	Pattana	2 - 1	Hakka Association of Thailand	Chonburi
17:00 (UTC+7)				Stadium: Chon Buri Sport School Artificial turf Football Field

=== Group E ===
Pos	Team	Pld	W	D	L	GF	GA	GD	Pts	Qualification or relegation
1	Isan Pattaya	2	2	0	0	15	1	+14	6	Qualification to Second Round
2	Rayong City	2	1	0	1	7	9	−2	3	Qualification to Second Round
3	Banbung Rovers	2	0	0	2	1	13	−12	0	

Updated to match(es) played on unknown. Source: Thai Division 3
Rules for classification: 1) points; 2) goal difference; 3) number of goals scored.

16 December 2016	Isan Pattaya	8 - 1	Rayong City	Chonburi
15:00 (UTC+7)				Stadium: Chon Buri Sport School Artificial turf Football Field

18 December 2016	Isan Pattaya	7 - 0	Banbung Rovers	Chonburi
17:00 (UTC+7)				Stadium: Chon Buri Sport School Artificial turf Football Field

21 December 2016	Rayong City	6 - 1	Banbung Rovers	Chonburi
13:00 (UTC+7)				Stadium: Chon Buri Sport School Artificial turf Football Field

=== Group F ===
Pos	Team	Pld	W	D	L	GF	GA	GD	Pts	Qualification or relegation
1	Sansuk Municipality Meangkanyang	2	1	1	0	5	4	+1	4	Qualification to Second Round
2	Pak Chong City	2	1	0	1	4	2	+2	3	Qualification to Second Round
3	Bangpakong Sports Association	2	0	1	1	3	6	−3	1	

Updated to match(es) played on unknown. Source: Thai Division 3
Rules for classification: 1) points; 2) goal difference; 3) number of goals scored.

16 December 2016	Sansuk Municipality Meangkanyang	2 - 1	Pak Chong City	Chonburi
17:00 (UTC+7)				Stadium: Chon Buri Sport School Artificial turf Football Field

19 December 2016	Pak Chong City	3 - 0	Bangpakong Sports Association	Chonburi
13:00 (UTC+7)				Stadium: Chon Buri Sport School Artificial turf Football Field

21 December 2016	Sansuk Municipality Meangkanyang	3 - 3	Bangpakong Sports Association	Chonburi
15:00 (UTC+7)				Stadium: Chon Buri Sport School Artificial turf Football Field

=== Group G ===
Pos	Team	Pld	W	D	L	GF	GA	GD	Pts	Qualification or relegation
1	Pattaya City Club	2	2	0	0	5	0	+5	6	Qualification to Quarter-finals Round
2	Institute of Physical Education Chonburi	2	1	0	1	4	3	+1	3	Qualification to Second Round
3	Salaeng Subdistrict Municipality	2	0	0	2	2	8	−6	0	

Updated to match(es) played on unknown. Source: Thai Division 3
Rules for classification: 1) points; 2) goal difference; 3) number of goals scored.

17 December 2016	Pattaya City Club	1 - 0	Institute of Physical Education Chonburi	Chonburi
13:00 (UTC+7)				Stadium: Chon Buri Sport School Artificial turf Football Field

19 December 2016	Pattaya City Club	4 - 0	Salaeng Subdistrict Municipality	Chonburi
17:00 (UTC+7)				Stadium: Chon Buri Sport School Artificial turf Football Field

21 December 2016	Institute of Physical Education Chonburi	4 - 2	Salaeng Subdistrict Municipality	Chonburi
17:00 (UTC+7)				Stadium: Chon Buri Sport School Artificial turf Football Field

== Second round ==
22 December 2016	Assumption College Sriracha	2 - 0	Na-Me United	Chonburi
13:00 (UTC+7)				Stadium: Chon Buri Sport School Artificial turf Football Field

22 December 2016	Khaobaisri	4 - 0	Traf Maptaphut	Chonburi
15:00 (UTC+7)				Stadium: Chon Buri Sport School Artificial turf Football Field

22 December 2016	Bankhai United	3 - 1	Pattana	Chonburi
17:00 (UTC+7)				Stadium: Chon Buri Sport School Artificial turf Football Field

23 December 2016	Hakka Association of Thailand	1 - 2	Isan Pattaya	Chonburi
13:00 (UTC+7)				Stadium: Chon Buri Sport School Artificial turf Football Field

23 December 2016	Rayong City	0 - 5	Sansuk Municipality Meangkanyang	Chonburi
15:00 (UTC+7)				Stadium: Chon Buri Sport School Artificial turf Football Field

23 December 2016	Pak Chong City	2 - 1	Institute of Physical Education Chonburi	Chonburi
17:00 (UTC+7)				Stadium: Chon Buri Sport School Artificial turf Football Field

== Quarter-finals Round ==
25 December 2016	ACDC	0(4) - 0(2)	Pattaya City Club	Chonburi
13:00 (UTC+7)				Stadium: Chon Buri Sport School Artificial turf Football Field

25 December 2016	Assumption College Sriracha	2 - 3	Isan Pattaya	Chonburi
15:00 (UTC+7)				Stadium: Chon Buri Sport School Artificial turf Football Field

26 December 2016	Khaobaisri	2(4) - 2(6)	Sansuk Municipality Meangkanyang	Chonburi
13:00 (UTC+7)				Stadium: Chon Buri Sport School Artificial turf Football Field

26 December 2016	Bankhai United	2 - 1	Pak Chong City	Chonburi
15:00 (UTC+7)				Stadium: Chon Buri Sport School Artificial turf Football Field

== Semi-finals Round ==
28 December 2016	ACDC	1(7) - 1(6)	Sansuk Municipality Meangkanyang	Chonburi
13:00 (UTC+7)				Stadium: Chon Buri Sport School Artificial turf Football Field

28 December 2016	Isan Pattaya	0(5) - 0(6)	Bankhai United	Chonburi
15:00 (UTC+7)				Stadium: Chon Buri Sport School Artificial turf Football Field

== Final round ==
30 December 2016	ACDC	1(3) - 1(4)	Bankhai United	Chonburi
13:00 (UTC+7)				Stadium: Chon Buri Sport School Artificial turf Football Field

== Winner ==
2016 Thai Division 3 Tournament Eastern Region

1st title

== See also ==
- 2016 Thai Division 3 Tournament Northern Region
- 2016 Thai Division 3 Tournament North Eastern Region
- 2016 Thai Division 3 Tournament Central Region
- 2016 Thai Division 3 Tournament Southern Region
