= Saraburi TRU F.C. =

Thai football club

Saraburi TRU F.C. สระบุรี ทีอาร์ยู เอฟซี
- Full name: Saraburi TRU Football Club สโมสรฟุตบอลสระบุรี ทีอาร์ยู
- Nicknames: The Griffin (เทพกริฟฟิน)
- Founded: 2015; 11 years ago
- Ground: Saraburi Stadium; Saraburi, Thailand
- Capacity: 6,000
- Chairman: Pachara khankaew
- Head Coach: Moulay Lahsen Azzeggooarh Wallen
- League: Thai League 4

Saraburi TRU Football Club (Thai สโมสรฟุตบอลสระบุรี ทีอาร์ยู), is a Thai semi professional football new club based in Saraburi. The club was formed in 2015 and entered the Regional League Division 2 and allocated into the Central & East Division from Derby match province project.

In 2017, licensing of this club didn't pass so the club was suspended 1 years.

== Stadium and locations ==
Coordinates	Location	Stadium	Capacity	Year
14°36′31″N 101°04′38″E	Saraburi	Tab Kwang Town municipality Stadium	1,000	2015
14°33′24″N 100°54′17″E	Saraburi	Saraburi Province Central Stadium	6,000	2016

== Season by season record ==
Season	League									FA Cup	League Cup	Top goalscorer	
Season	Division	P	W	D	L	F	A	Pts	Pos	FA Cup	League Cup	Name	Goals
2015	Central-East	26	11	9	6	46	36	42	6th	R1	1st Qualification		
2016	Central	20	5	5	10	19	24	20	8th	Not Enter	1st Qualification		
2017	Suspended												

Champions	Runners-up	Promoted	Relegated
