= Prachinburi Provincial Administrative Organization Stadium =

Stadium in Prachinburi, Thailand

- Interactive map of Prachinburi Provincial Administrative Organization Stadium
- Location: Prachinburi, Thailand
- Coordinates: 14°03′53″N 101°22′30″E
- Capacity: 3,000
- Surface: Grass
- Current use: football matches

Tenant
- Prachinburi City

Prachinburi Provincial Administrative Organization Stadium (Thai: สนาม อบจ.ปราจีนบุรี หรือ สนามกีฬาจังหวัดปราจีนบุรี) is a multi-purpose stadium in Prachinburi province, Thailand. It is used mostly for football matches and is the home stadium of Prachinburi United F.C. The stadium holds 3,000 people.
