= Wuttichai Asusheewa =

Thai professional footballer

Personal information
- Full name: Wuttichai Asusheewa
- Date of birth: September 14, 1983 (age 43)
- Place of birth: Kalasin, Thailand
- Height: 1.76 m (5 ft 9 1/2 in)
- Position: Striker

Senior career*
Years	Team	Apps	(Gls)
2007–2011	Rajnavy Rayong	68	(21)
2012	Trat	39	(8)
2013–2014	Suphanburi	19	(2)
2014	→ Osotspa Saraburi (loan)	8	(0)
2015–2016	Prachuap		
2017–	Royal Thai Fleet		
- * Club domestic league appearances and goals as of 14 November 2008

Wuttichai Asusheewa (Thai: วุฒิชัย อะสุชีวะ, born September 14, 1983) is a Thai professional footballer who plays as a striker.
