= Internazionale Pattaya F.C. =

Thai football club

Inter Pattaya อินเตอร์ พัทยา
- Full name: Internazionale Pattaya Football Club สโมสรฟุตบอลอินแตร์นาซีโอนาเลพัทยา
- Short name: IPFC
- Founded: 20 December 2015
- Dissolved: 2016
- Ground: Inter Stadium; Pattaya, Bang Lamung, Chonburi, Thailand
- Capacity: 2,000
Home colours	Away colours

Internazionale Pattaya Football Club commonly referred to as Inter Pattaya (Thai: สโมสรฟุตบอลอินเตอร์ พัทยา) is a Thai football club based in Pattaya, Chonburi province. Established in late 2015 to compete in the 2016 Regional League Division 2.

== Season By Season Record ==
Season	League									FA Cup	League Cup	Top goalscorer	
Season	Division	P	W	D	L	F	A	Pts	Pos	FA Cup	League Cup	Name	Goals
2016	DIV 2 Bangkok-East						banned						

- The club withdrew after 4 games in 2016
- The club is judged by FA Thailand Regional League part to banned the club indefinite due to outstanding payment.

Champions	Runners-up	Promoted	Relegated

== Coaches ==
Coaches by year

Name	Nat	Period	Honours
Sébastien Roques	(France)	2016	
Bertrand Crasson	(Belgium)	2016	
