= Nong Prue Stadium =

Thai football stadium

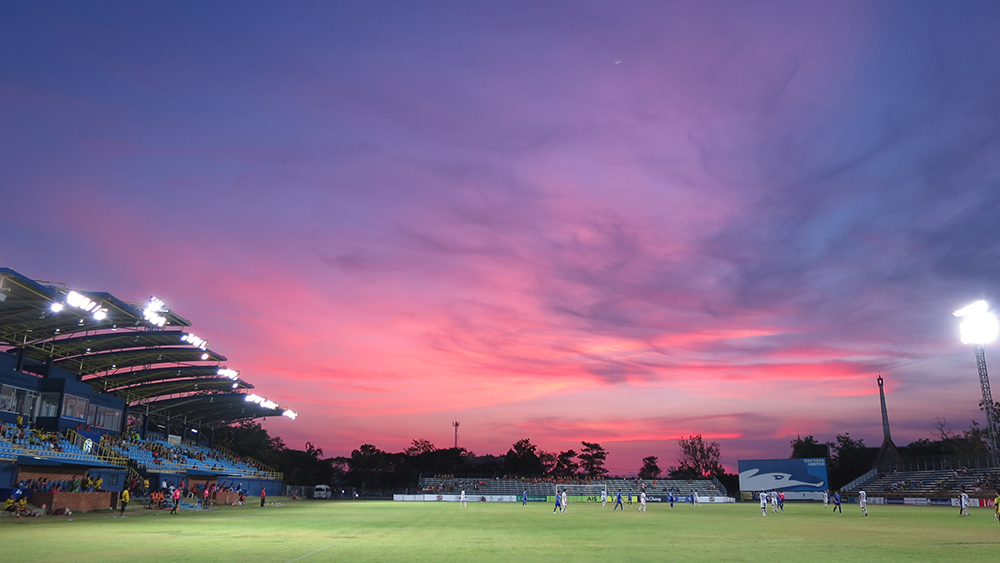
- Interactive map of Nong Prue Stadium
- Location: Pattaya, Bang Lamung, Chonburi, Thailand
- Coordinates: 12°55′28″N 100°56′14″E
- Owner: Nong Prue Municipality
- Operator: Nong Prue Municipality
- Capacity: 5,500
- Surface: Natural Grass

Construction
- Opened: 1999
- Cost: 20 Million Baht

Tenants
- Pattaya United F.C. (2008); Pattaya United F.C. (2023); BFB Pattaya City F.C.

Nong Prue Stadium (Thai: สนามกีฬาหนองปรือ) also known as Nongprue Municipality Stadium (Thai: สนามเทศบาลหนองปรือ) is a stadium in Pattaya, Chonburi, Thailand. Construction began in 1998 before opening in 1999. It holds a capacity of 5,500 spectators is currently used for football matches and was the home stadium of Pattaya United of the Thai League 2.

Construction on Nong Prue stadium began in 1998 before its opening in 1999.

== Photos ==
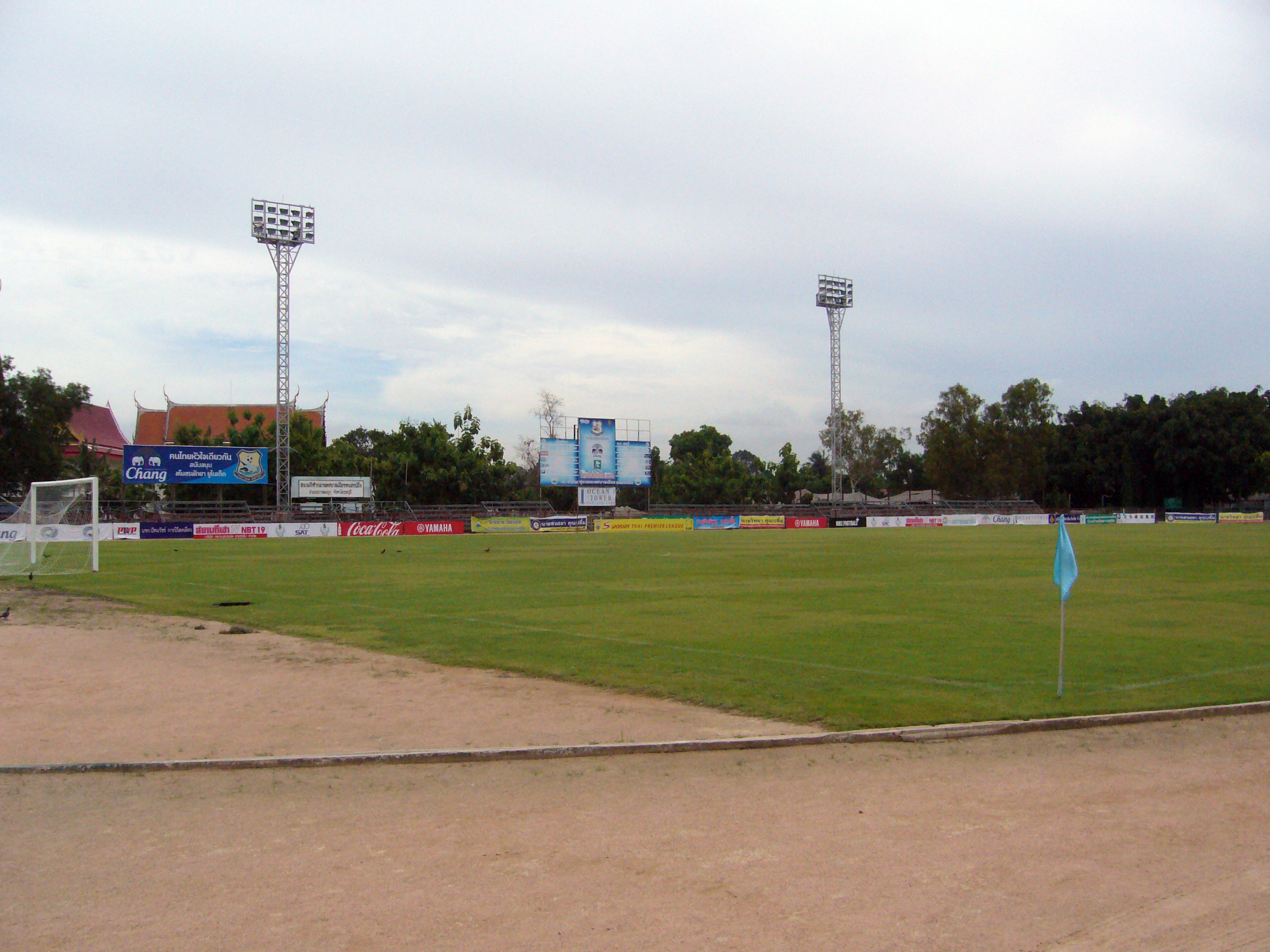
Nong Prue Stadium in 2010

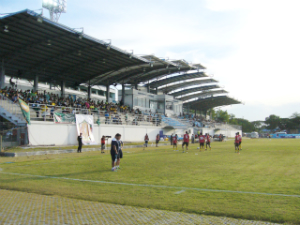
Nong Prue Stadium Main Stand

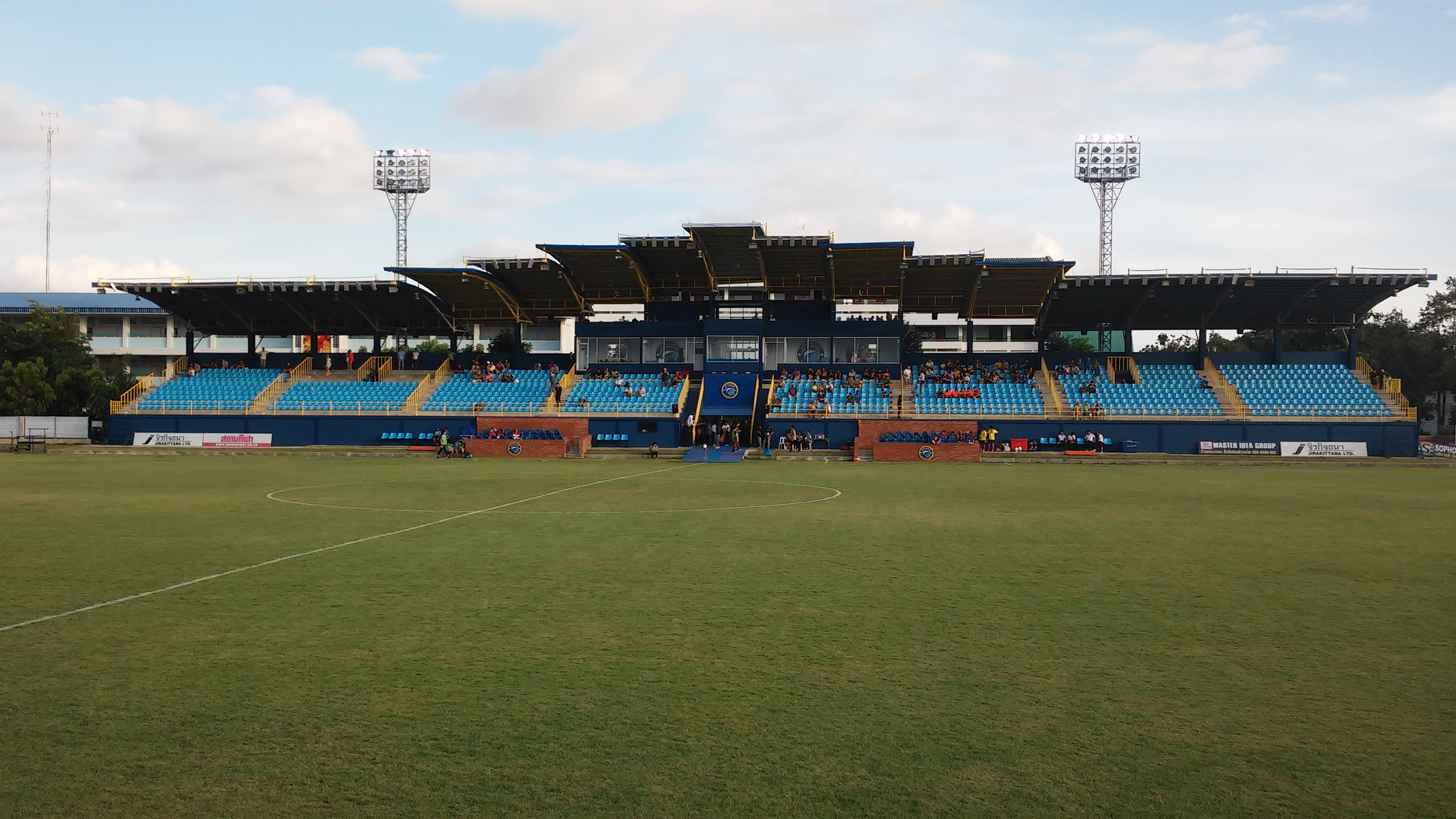
In 2015

== See also ==
- Nong Prue 2 Stadium
