= Thai football league system =

Series of interconnected leagues

== Cup eligibility ==
Being members of a league at a particular level also affects the eligibility for Cup competitions.

- Thai FA Cup: Levels 1 to 5
- Thai League Cup: Levels 1 to 3
- Thai League 3 Cup: Level 3

== Current system ==
Level	League(s)/Division(s)
	Professional leagues
1	Thai League (T1); 16 clubs
	↓↑ 3 teams
2	Thai League 2 (T2); 18 clubs
	↓↑ 3 teams
3	Thai League 3 (T3); 72 clubs divided by 6 regions: Region 1 Northern; 11 clubs / Region 2 Northeastern; 13 clubs / Region 3 Eastern; 11 clubs / Region 4 Western; 11 clubs / Region 5 Southern; 12 clubs / Region 6 Bangkok Metropolitan; 14 clubs
	↓↑ 6 teams
	Semi-professional leagues
4	Thailand Semi-pro League (TS) (Semi-pro) Unlimited clubs but must meet the club licensing standards, 38 clubs divided by 6 regions in 2024 season: Region 1 Northern; 7 clubs / Region 2 Northeastern; 9 clubs / Region 3 Eastern; 8 clubs / Region 4 Western; 7 clubs / Region 5 Southern; 2 clubs / Region 6 Bangkok Metropolitan; 5 clubs
	Non-league competition
Non-league	Thailand Amateur League (TA) (Amateur) Unlimited clubs, competing to maintain membership of amateur clubs: Region 1 Northern Upper / Region 2 Northern Lower / Region 3 North Eastern Upper / Region 4 North Eastern Lower / Region 5 Eastern Upper / Region 6 Eastern Lower / Region 7 Western Upper / Region 8 Western Lower / Region 9 Bangkok Metropolitan / Region 10; Bangkok Perimeter / Region 11; Southern Upper / Region 12; Southern Lower

== Former system ==
=== Before 1996 season ===
Before the top level of Thai football league, Thai Premier League was constituted in 1996, the Football Royal Cup was the football competitions of Thailand at that time.

The Thailand football competition system before 1996 is listed below:

==== 1916–1961 seasons ====
In 1916, Football Association of Thailand was found Yai Cup (ถ้วยใหญ่, i.e. "big cup") and Noi Cup (ถ้วยน้อย, i.e. "small cup") for the purpose of annual football competitions in Thailand.

Level	Football Royal Cup
1	Yai Cup (ถ้วยใหญ่)
2	Noi Cup (ถ้วยน้อย)

==== 1962–1995 seasons ====
In 1962, because of the abundant football clubs in Thailand then the Football Association of Thailand changed the name of Yai Cup (ถ้วยใหญ่) to the Kor Royal Cup (ถ้วย ก.) and changed the name of Noi Cup (ถ้วยน้อย) to the Khǒr Royal Cup (ถ้วย ข.) and added the Khor Royal Cup (ถ้วย ค.) and the Ngor Royal Cup (ถ้วย ง.) to the Football Royal Cup competitions.

Level	Football Royal Cup
1	Kor Royal Cup (ถ้วย ก.)
2	Khǒr Royal Cup (ถ้วย ข.)
3	Khor Royal Cup (ถ้วย ค.)
4	Ngor Royal Cup (ถ้วย ง.)

=== 1996–1998 seasons ===
In 1996 season, The Thai Premier League, The top level of football league was constituted by Football Association of Thailand rather than Kor Royal Cup. and FAT also found Division 1 League in the next season (1997).

Kor Royal Cup The trophy contested in an annual Super Cup competition match between the champions of Thai Premier League and the runners-up of Thai Premier League or Thai FA Cup

The Thailand football league system in 1996–1998 season before Division 2 League and Provincial League was created is listed below:

Level	Football Leagues
1	Thai Premier League
2	Division 1
3	Khǒr Royal Cup (ถ้วย ข.)
4	Khor Royal Cup (ถ้วย ค.)
5	Ngor Royal Cup (ถ้วย ง.)

=== 1999–2002 seasons ===
In 1999 season, Provincial League was found by the Football Association of Thailand for this reason, There are two separate football league competitions in Thailand in the meantime.

Although there are two separate leagues in Thailand, only the winner and runner-up from the Thai Premier League, which is controlled by Football Association of Thailand, are eligible to play in AFC Champions League and AFC Cup respectively.

Level	Football Leagues	
1	Thai Premier League	Provincial League by Football Association of Thailand and Sports Authority of Thailand (Select from each region.): Region; 1 Central / Region; 2 Eastern / Region; 3 Northern / Region; 4 Northeast / Region; 5 Southern
2	Division 1	
3	Khǒr Royal Cup (ถ้วย ข.)	
4	Khor Royal Cup (ถ้วย ค.)	
5	Ngor Royal Cup (ถ้วย ง.)	

=== 2003 season ===
In 2003 season, the Provincial League was organized by the Sports Authority of Thailand; relegation was to the Pro League 2 for the next season. There are two separate football league competitions in Thailand in the meantime.

Although there are two separate leagues in Thailand, only the winner and runner-up from the Thai Premier League, which is controlled by Football Association of Thailand, are eligible to play in AFC Champions League and AFC Cup respectively.

Level	Football Leagues	
1	Thai Premier League	Provincial League by the Sports Authority of Thailand (SAT): Region; 1 Central / Region; 2 Eastern / Region; 3 Northern / Region; 4 Northeast / Region; 5 Southern
2	Division 1	
3	Khǒr Royal Cup (ถ้วย ข.)	
4	Khor Royal Cup (ถ้วย ค.)	
5	Ngor Royal Cup (ถ้วย ง.)	

=== 2004 season ===
In 2004 season, Provincial League was found Pro League 1 and Pro League 2 by the Sports Authority of Thailand (SAT) for this reason

Level	Football Leagues	
1	Thai Premier League	Provincial League by the Sports Authority of Thailand (SAT); Pro League 1
2	Division 1	Pro League 2
3	Khǒr Royal Cup (ถ้วย ข.)	
4	Khor Royal Cup (ถ้วย ค.)	
5	Ngor Royal Cup (ถ้วย ง.)	

=== 2005 season ===
In 2005 season, the winner and runner-up of the Provincial League 2005, Chonburi FC and Suphanburi FC began the practice of move to play in the Thai Premier League 2006.

Although there are two separate leagues in Thailand, only the winner and runner-up from the Thai Premier League, which is controlled by Football Association of Thailand, are eligible to play in AFC Champions League and AFC Cup respectively.

Level	Football Leagues	
1	Thai Premier League	
2	Division 1	Provincial League by the Sports Authority of Thailand (SAT); Pro League 1
3	Khǒr Royal Cup (ถ้วย ข.)	Pro League 2
4	Khor Royal Cup (ถ้วย ค.)	
5	Ngor Royal Cup (ถ้วย ง.)	

=== 2006 season ===
In 2006 season, Provincial League renamed Professional League by the Sports Authority of Thailand (SAT) and the Division 2 League was founded by the Football Association of Thailand in this season,

1st and 3rd of the Provincial League 2006, TOT and Nakhon Pathom began the practice of moving to play in the Thai Premier League 2007.

The proposed merger of the Provincial League and Thai Premier League into one entity, though supported by the Football Association of Thailand, had been attempted several times without success. Finally, in January 2007, the FAT announced a merger that would make the Provincial League a part of the Thai Premier League.

The Thailand football league system in 2006 season before combined the Thai Premier League, Division 1, Division 2 and Provincial League together in 2007 is listed below:

- 1st and 3rd 2006 Pro League 1 Promoted to 2007 Thailand Premier League
- 5th,7th,9th,11th,13th 2006 Pro League 1 move to 2007 Thailand Division 1 League Group A
- 4th,6th,8th,10th,12th,14th 2006 Pro League 1 move to 2007 Thailand Division 1 League Group B
- 15th–16th 2006 Pro League 1 Relegation to 2007 Thailand League Division 2.
- Winner 2006 Pro League 2 Ratchaburi Promoted to 2007 Thailand Division 1 League Group A
- Runner-Up 2006 Pro League 2 Samut Songkhram Promoted to 2007 Thailand Division 1 League Group B
- Winner 2005–06 Khǒr Royal Cup (ถ้วย ข.) Royal Thai Marine Promoted to 2007 Thailand Division 1 League Group B
- Runner-Up 2005–06 Khǒr Royal Cup (ถ้วย ข.) Thai Airways Promoted to 2007 Thailand Division 1 League Group A
- Winner 2006 Thailand League Division 2 Chula-Sinthana Promoted to 2007 Thailand Division 1 League Group B

Level	Football Leagues		
1	Thai Premier League		
2	Division 1		Professional League by the Sports Authority of Thailand (SAT); Pro League 1
3	Khǒr Royal Cup (ถ้วย ข.)	Division 2	Pro League 2
4	Khor Royal Cup (ถ้วย ค.)		
5	Ngor Royal Cup (ถ้วย ง.)		

=== 2007–2008 seasons ===
In the 2007 season, Division 1 was divided into two groups (22 clubs). In the 2008 season, Division 2 also was divided into two groups. Until the 2009 season, the number of teams from all leagues in the High division will consist of 16 clubs.

- Lopburi FC 2007 Provincial League Winner was promoted to Thailand Division 2 League 2008 (Group B).
- Songkhla FC 2007 Provincial League Runner-Up was promoted to Thailand Division 2 League 2008 (Group A).
- Raj Pracha 2007–08 Khǒr Royal Cup (ถ้วย ข.) Winner was promoted to Thailand Division 2 League 2008 (Group A).
- Kasem Bundit University 2007–08 Khǒr Royal Cup (ถ้วย ข.) Runner-Up was promoted to Thailand Division 2 League 2008 (Group B).

In 2008 season no team in Provincial League was promoted to Division 2 League.

However, in the 2009 season, FAT needed to develop the Thai football league system and specify the quality of the team in high-division for conforming to AFC regulation. Consequently, they determined to adjust the Division 2 competition form by combining it with Provincial League and dividing Division 2 league into 5 regions (Bangkok and perimeter, Central and Eastern, Northern, North-Eastern, and Southern).

The Thailand football league system in 2007–2008 season before combined Division 2 League and Provincial League together in 2009 is listed below:

Level	High-Division	
1	Thai Premier League	
2	Division 1	
3	Division 2	
	Low-Division	
4	Khǒr Royal Cup (ถ้วย ข.)	SAT Championship Playoff (The winners and runners-up from each region.) Provincial League: Region; 1 Central / Region; 2 Eastern / Region; 3 Northern / Region; 4 Northeast / Region; 5 Southern
5	Khor Royal Cup (ถ้วย ค.)	SAT Championship Playoff (The winners and runners-up from each region.) Provincial League: Region; 1 Central / Region; 2 Eastern / Region; 3 Northern / Region; 4 Northeast / Region; 5 Southern
6	Ngor Royal Cup (ถ้วย ง.)	SAT Championship Playoff (The winners and runners-up from each region.) Provincial League: Region; 1 Central / Region; 2 Eastern / Region; 3 Northern / Region; 4 Northeast / Region; 5 Southern

=== 2009–2012 seasons ===
Level	High-Division
1	Thai Premier League
2	Division 1
3	Regional League Division 2 (Semi-pro): Region 1 Bangkok & Perimeter / Region 2 Central / Eastern / Region 3 Northern / Region 4 North-Eastern / Region 5 Southern
	Low-Division
4	Khǒr Royal Cup (ถ้วย ข.)
5	Khor Royal Cup (ถ้วย ค.)
6	Ngor Royal Cup (ถ้วย ง.)

=== 2013–2015 seasons ===
Level	High-Division
1	Thai Premier League
2	Division 1
3	Regional League Division 2 (Semi-pro): Region 1 Bangkok Metropolitan / Region 2 Central-East / Region 3 Central-West / Region 4 Northern / Region 5 North-Eastern / Region 6 Southern
	Low-Division
4	Khǒr Royal Cup (ถ้วย ข.)
5	Khor Royal Cup (ถ้วย ค.)
6	Ngor Royal Cup (ถ้วย ง.)

=== 2016 season ===
Level	Football Leagues
1	Thai League; 18 clubs
2	Division 1; 16 clubs
3	Regional League Division 2 (Semi-pro) 94 clubs: Region 1 Bangkok Metropolitan; 11 clubs / Region 2 Eastern; 12 clubs / Region 3 Western; 12 clubs / Region 4 Northern; 12 clubs / Region 5 North-Eastern; 14 clubs / Region 6 Southern; 12 clubs / Region 7 Central; 11 clubs / Region 8 Bangkok-East; 10 clubs
4	Football Division 3 (Amateur) 104 clubs: Region 1 Northern; 13 clubs / Region 2 North-Eastern; 10 clubs / Region 3 Eastern; 21 clubs / Region 4 Central; 56 clubs / Region 5 Southern; 4 clubs

=== 2017–2018 seasons ===
Level	Football Leagues
1	Thai League (T1); 18 clubs
2	Thai League 2 (T2); 18 clubs
3	Thai League 3 (T3) (Semi-pro) 32 clubs: Region 1 Upper Region; 16 clubs / Region 2 Lower Region; 16 clubs
4	Thai League 4 (T4) (Semi-pro) 64 clubs: Region 1 Northern; 10 clubs / Region 2 North Eastern; 12 clubs / Region 3 Eastern; 10 clubs / Region 4 Western; 10 clubs / Region 5 Bangkok Metropolitan; 11 clubs / Region 6 Southern; 9 clubs
5	Thailand Amateur League (Amateur) Unlimited clubs: Region 1 Northern Upper / Region 2 Northern Lower / Region 3 North Eastern Upper / Region 4 North Eastern Lower / Region 5 Eastern Upper / Region 6 Eastern Lower / Region 7 Western Upper / Region 8 Western Lower / Region 9 Bangkok Metropolitan / Region 10; Bangkok Perimeter / Region 11; Southern Upper / Region 12; Southern Lower

=== 2019 season ===
Level	Football Leagues
1	Thai League (T1); 16 clubs
2	Thai League 2 (T2); 18 clubs
3	Thai League 3 (T3) (Semi-pro) 28 clubs: Region 1 Upper Region; 14 clubs / Region 2 Lower Region; 14 clubs
4	Thai League 4 (T4) (Semi-pro) 60 clubs: Region 1 Northern; 10 clubs / Region 2 North Eastern; 12 clubs / Region 3 Eastern; 10 clubs / Region 4 Western; 10 clubs / Region 5 Bangkok Metropolitan; 11 clubs / Region 6 Southern; 9 clubs
5	Thailand Amateur League (Amateur) Unlimited clubs: Region 1 Northern Upper / Region 2 Northern Lower / Region 3 North Eastern Upper / Region 4 North Eastern Lower / Region 5 Eastern Upper / Region 6 Eastern Lower / Region 7 Western Upper / Region 8 Western Lower / Region 9 Bangkok Metropolitan / Region 10; Bangkok Perimeter / Region 11; Southern Upper / Region 12; Southern Lower

=== 2020–2021 seasons ===
Level	Football Leagues
1	Thai League (T1); 16 clubs
2	Thai League 2 (T2); 18 clubs
3	Thai League 3 (T3) (Semi-pro) 72 clubs: Region 1 Northern; 11 clubs / Region 2 North Eastern; 11 clubs / Region 3 Eastern; 12 clubs / Region 4 Western; 12 clubs / Region 5 Bangkok Metropolitan; 14 clubs / Region 6 Southern; 12 clubs
4	Thailand Amateur League (Amateur) Unlimited clubs: Region 1 Northern Upper / Region 2 Northern Lower / Region 3 North Eastern Upper / Region 4 North Eastern Lower / Region 5 Eastern Upper / Region 6 Eastern Lower / Region 7 Western Upper / Region 8 Western Lower / Region 9 Bangkok Metropolitan / Region 10; Bangkok Perimeter / Region 11; Southern Upper / Region 12; Southern Lower

== See also ==
- Worldwide football league system
- Football in Thailand
- Thai football records and statistics
- List of football clubs in Thailand
