= 2019 Thai League 4 =

Thai League 4
- Season: 2019
- Dates: 9 February – 27 October

The 2019 Thai League 4 is the 19th season of the Thai League 4, the fourth-tier professional league for association football clubs in Thailand, since its establishment in 2006 as the regional league division 2, also known as Omsin League due to the sponsorship deal with Government Savings Bank (Omsin Bank). A total of 60 teams would divided into 6 regions.

== Regional League stage All locations ==
Locations of the 2019 Thai League 4 All Teams
2019 Thai League 4 Bangkok & field Region
2019 Thai League 4 Eastern Region
2019 Thai League 4 Western Region
2019 Thai League 4 Northern Region
2019 Thai League 4 North Eastern Region
2019 Thai League 4 Southern Region

=== 2019 ===
Green Zone: 2019 Thai League 4 Northern Region
Orange Zone: 2019 Thai League 4 Northeastern Region
Yellow Zone : 2019 Thai League 4 Eastern Region
Pink Zone: 2019 Thai League 4 Western Region
Red Zone : 2019 Thai League 4 Bangkok Metropolitan Region
Blue Zone: 2019 Thai League 4 Southern Region

=== List of Qualified Teams ===
==== Upper zone ====
T4 North (2)

T4 Northeast (2)

T4 East (2)

==== Lower zone ====
T4 West (2)

T4 Bangkok (2)

T4 South (2)

Football clubs in Bangkok Metropolitan Region

== Regional stage ==
The number of teams in 6 regions including 10 teams in the Northern region, 13 teams in the Northeastern region, 8 teams in the Eastern region, 9 teams in the Western region, 7 teams in the Southern region, and 13 teams in the Bangkok metropolitan region. The reserve of Thai League 1 and Thai League 2 teams could compete in Thai League 4 as team (B) but they could not be promoted or relegated. If the reserve team finished in the bottom half of their region's league table, they would be suspended in the next season.

The winners and runners-up (except reserve teams) of each regions will advance to the champions league stage to finding 4 teams promoting to the 2020 Thai League 3. Meanwhile, the last placed (except reserve teams) of each regions will relegate to the 2020 Thailand Amateur League.

=== Northern region ===
League table

Pos	Team	Pld	W	D	L	GF	GA	GD	Pts	Qualification or relegation
1	Uttaradit (Q)	27	20	6	1	77	16	+61	66	Qualification to the Champions League stage
2	Wat Bot City (Q)	27	17	7	3	65	24	+41	58	Qualification to the Champions League stage
3	Maejo United	27	15	8	4	72	29	+43	53	
4	Phitsanulok	27	12	9	6	43	25	+18	45	
5	Nan	27	12	7	8	49	34	+15	43	
6	Nakhon Mae Sot United	27	10	8	9	48	26	+22	38	
7	Singburi Bangrajun (R)	27	11	4	12	47	46	+1	37	Relegation to the 2020 Thailand Amateur League
8	JL Chiangmai United (B)	27	5	2	20	31	61	−30	17	Suspension in 2020 season
9	Sukhothai (B)	27	3	3	21	24	83	−59	12	Suspension in 2020 season
10	Chiangrai United (B)	27	2	2	23	22	134	−112	8	Suspension in 2020 season

Source: Thai League
Rules for classification: 1) Points; 2) Head-to-head points; 3) Head-to-head goal difference; 4) Head-to-head goal scored; 5) Overall goal difference; 6) Overall goal scored; 7) Fair play points; 8) Play-off without extra time).
(Q) Qualified for the phase indicated; (R) Relegated

=== Northeastern region ===
League table

Pos	Team	Pld	W	D	L	GF	GA	GD	Pts	Qualification or relegation
1	Muang Loei United (Q)	24	17	4	3	55	15	+40	55	Qualification to the Champions League stage
2	Huai Thalaeng United (Q)	24	12	6	6	41	33	+8	42	Qualification to the Champions League stage
3	Sisaket United	24	11	5	8	31	33	−2	38	
4	Khon Kaen Mordindang	24	9	10	5	49	33	+16	37 (Note: Khon Kaen Mordindang ahead on head-to-head record; Khon Kaen Mordindang 4 pts, Buriram United (B) 1 pt.)	
5	Buriram United (B)	24	9	10	5	35	35	0	37	
6	Surin Sugar Khong Chee Mool	24	7	11	6	33	27	+6	32	
7	Surin City	24	7	10	7	39	34	+5	31	
8	Sakon Nakhon	24	7	8	9	39	44	−5	29	
9	Mashare Chaiyaphum	24	6	10	8	25	33	−8	28	
10	Nongbua Pitchaya (B)	24	5	8	11	24	33	−9	23	
11	Yasothon	24	4	9	11	28	43	−15	21 (Note: Yasothon ahead on head-to-head record; Yasothon 4 pts, Mahasarakham 1 pt.)	
12	Mahasarakham	24	4	9	11	18	29	−11	21	
13	Kalasin (R)	24	4	8	12	26	51	−25	20	Relegation to the 2020 Thailand Amateur League

Source: Thai League
Rules for classification: 1) Points; 2) Head-to-head points; 3) Head-to-head goal difference; 4) Head-to-head goal scored; 5) Overall goal difference; 6) Overall goal scored; 7) Fair play points; 8) Play-off without extra time).
(Q) Qualified for the phase indicated; (R) Relegated

=== Eastern region ===
League table

Pos	Team	Pld	W	D	L	GF	GA	GD	Pts	Qualification or relegation
1	Bankhai United (Q)	28	19	6	3	60	19	+41	63	Qualification to the Champions League stage
2	Kohkwang (Q)	28	18	5	5	51	24	+27	59	Qualification to the Champions League stage
3	Pattaya Discovery United	28	15	6	7	52	31	+21	51	
4	Saimit Kabin United	28	10	10	8	32	30	+2	40	
5	Pluakdaeng United	28	8	8	12	35	39	−4	32	
6	Chanthaburi	28	7	7	14	30	44	−14	28	
7	Royal Thai Fleet	28	6	6	16	32	56	−24	24	
8	Phanthong (R)	28	2	6	20	17	66	−49	12	Relegation to the 2020 Thailand Amateur League

Source: Thai League
Rules for classification: 1) Points; 2) Head-to-head points; 3) Head-to-head goal difference; 4) Head-to-head goal scored; 5) Overall goal difference; 6) Overall goal scored; 7) Fair play points; 8) Play-off without extra time).
(Q) Qualified for the phase indicated; (R) Relegated

=== Western region ===
League table

Pos	Team	Pld	W	D	L	GF	GA	GD	Pts	Qualification or relegation
1	Hua Hin City (Q)	24	17	2	5	52	16	+36	53	Qualification to the Champions League stage
2	Chainat United (Q)	24	16	3	5	53	29	+24	51	Qualification to the Champions League stage
3	Assumption United	24	14	4	6	44	30	+14	46	
4	Saraburi United	24	9	7	8	41	34	+7	34	
5	Chainat Hornbill (B)	24	9	3	12	37	35	+2	30	
6	Samut Songkhram	24	7	5	12	27	40	−13	26 (Note: Samut Songkhram ahead on head-to-head record; Samut Songkhram 9 pts, IPE Samut Sakhon United 0 pts.)	
7	IPE Samut Sakhon United	24	7	5	12	25	45	−20	26	
8	Look E San (R)	24	5	8	11	23	30	−7	23	Relegation to the 2020 Thailand Amateur League
9	Ratchaburi Mitr Phol (B)	24	3	5	16	25	68	−43	14	Suspension in 2020 season

Source: Thai League
Rules for classification: 1) Points; 2) Head-to-head points; 3) Head-to-head goal difference; 4) Head-to-head goal scored; 5) Overall goal difference; 6) Overall goal scored; 7) Fair play points; 8) Play-off without extra time).
(Q) Qualified for the phase indicated; (R) Relegated

=== Southern region ===
League table

Pos	Team	Pld	W	D	L	GF	GA	GD	Pts	Qualification or relegation
1	Satun United (Q)	24	14	5	5	47	17	+30	47	Qualification to the Champions League stage
2	Pattani (Q)	24	12	7	5	34	20	+14	43	Qualification to the Champions League stage
3	Surat Thani City	24	11	9	4	39	26	+13	42	
4	Hatyai City	24	8	4	12	31	34	−3	28	
5	Jalor City	24	5	9	10	20	31	−11	24	
6	Phatthalung	24	4	10	10	18	33	−15	22	
7	Muangkhon WU (R)	24	5	6	13	30	58	−28	21	Relegation to the 2020 Thailand Amateur League

Source: Thai League
Rules for classification: 1) Points; 2) Head-to-head points; 3) Head-to-head goal difference; 4) Head-to-head goal scored; 5) Overall goal difference; 6) Overall goal scored; 7) Fair play points; 8) Play-off without extra time).
(Q) Qualified for the phase indicated; (R) Relegated

=== Bangkok Metropolitan region ===
League table

Pos	Team	Pld	W	D	L	GF	GA	GD	Pts	Qualification or relegation
1	SCG Muangthong United (B)	24	16	7	1	43	15	+28	55	
2	Bangkok United (B)	24	17	3	4	44	21	+23	54	
3	Pathumthani University (Q)	24	15	7	2	49	23	+26	52	Qualification to the Champions League stage
4	Thonburi University (Q)	24	13	5	6	30	16	+14	44	Qualification to the Champions League stage
5	Police Tero (B)	24	12	6	6	26	21	+5	42	
6	Grakcu Sai Mai United	24	11	7	6	30	20	+10	40	
7	Siam	24	8	6	10	31	29	+2	30	
8	Bankunmae	24	7	6	11	25	31	−6	27	
9	Samut Prakan	24	6	6	12	22	33	−11	24	
10	Air Force Robinson	24	4	8	12	24	32	−8	20	
11	Rangsit United	24	5	4	15	19	39	−20	19	
12	Rangsit University (R)	24	4	5	15	11	33	−22	17	Relegation to the 2020 Thailand Amateur League
13	Air Force United (B)	24	2	2	20	18	59	−41	8	Suspension in 2020 season

Source: Thai League
Rules for classification: 1) Points; 2) Head-to-head points; 3) Head-to-head goal difference; 4) Head-to-head goal scored; 5) Overall goal difference; 6) Overall goal scored; 7) Fair play points; 8) Play-off without extra time).
(Q) Qualified for the phase indicated; (R) Relegated

== Champions League stage ==
The champions league stage is the next stage from the regional stage. 1st and 2nd places of each zone qualified to this stage by featured in 2 groups. Teams from Northern, Northeastern, and Eastern regions would have qualified to the upper group. Meanwhile, teams from Western, Southern, and Bangkok Metropolitan regions would have qualified to the lower group. Winners and runners-ups of the upper and lower groups would promoted to the 2020 Thai League 3.

=== Group stage ===
Upper region

Pos	Team	Pld	W	D	L	GF	GA	GD	Pts	Qualification	WBC	MLU	BKU	KKG	UDT	HTU
1	Wat Bot City (Q, P)	5	4	0	1	12	5	+7	12	Qualification to knockout stage and promotion to 2020 Thai League 3	—	1–2	—	3–0	—	3–1
2	Muang Loei United (Q, P)	5	3	2	0	7	3	+4	11	Qualification to knockout stage and promotion to 2020 Thai League 3	—	—	3–1	0–0	1–0	—
3	Bankhai United	5	3	0	2	9	8	+1	9		1–3	—	—	2–0	—	3–2
4	Kohkwang	5	1	2	2	6	10	−4	5		—	—	—	—	3–3	3–2
5	Uttaradit	5	1	1	3	6	9	−3	4		1–2	—	0–2	—	—	—
6	Huai Thalaeng United	5	0	1	4	7	12	−5	1		—	1–1	—	—	1–2	—

Source: Thai League
Rules for classification: 1) Points; 2) Head-to-head points; 3) Goal difference; 4) Goals scored;).
(P) Promoted; (Q) Qualified for the phase indicated

Lower region

Pos	Team	Pld	W	D	L	GF	GA	GD	Pts	Qualification	PTN	PTU	HHC	TBU	CNU	STU
1	Pattani (Q, P)	5	4	0	1	11	4	+7	12	Qualification to knockout stage and promotion to 2020 Thai League 3	—	—	2–0	4–1	4–2	—
2	Pathumthani University (Q, P)	5	3	2	0	9	5	+4	11	Qualification to knockout stage and promotion to 2020 Thai League 3	1–0	—	—	—	—	4–2
3	Hua Hin City	5	3	0	2	6	5	+1	9		—	0–1	—	1–0	—	—
4	Thonburi University	5	1	2	2	7	9	−2	5		—	2–2	—	—	3–1	—
5	Chainat United	5	1	1	3	7	11	−4	4		—	1–1	0–1	—	—	3–2
6	Satun United	5	0	1	4	7	13	−6	1		0–1	—	2–4	1–1	—	—

Source: Thai League
Rules for classification: 1) Points; 2) Head-to-head points; 3) Goal difference; 4) Goals scored;).
(P) Promoted; (Q) Qualified for the phase indicated

== Final round ==
=== Third place play-off ===
==== Summary ====
Team 1	Agg.	Team 2	1st leg	2nd leg
Pathumthani University	3–7	Muang Loei United	1–4	2–3

==== Matches ====
19 October 2019
16:00 UTC+7

Pathumthani University	1 – 4	Muang Loei United
Phontakorn Thosanthiah 87'	Report	Danuson Wijitpunya 2', 54'; Patipat Kamsat 25'; Wirachai Buayalraksa 85'

Ratchakram Stadium, Ayutthaya
Attendance: 250
Referee: Sarawut Pramottayakul (Thailand)
26 October 2019
16:00 UTC+7

Muang Loei United	3 – 2	Pathumthani University
Patipat Kamsat 13'; Danuson Wijitpunya 62', 87'	Report	Promphong Kransumrong 6', 34'

Wang Saphung Stadium, Loei
Attendance: 227
Referee: Suchin Khewsopa (Thailand)

Muang Loei United won 7–3 on aggregate.

=== Champion round ===
Champion of Upper group and Lower group in Group Stage round pass this round. Winner of Champion round get champion of 2019 Thai League 4

==== Summary ====
Team 1	Agg.	Team 2	1st leg	2nd leg
Pattani	2–2 (5–6 p)	Wat Bot City	1–1	1–1 (a.e.t.) (5–6 p)

==== Matches ====
20 October 2019
16:00 UTC+7

Pattani	1 – 1	Wat Bot City
Apirat Heemkhao 54'	Report	Natthawut Nueamai 2'

Pattani Provincial Stadium, Pattani
Attendance: 7,500
Referee: Sakda Jitsupaworakul (Thailand)
27 October 2019
18:00 UTC+7

Wat Bot City	1 – 1 (a.e.t.)	Pattani
Célio Guilherme da Silva Santos 90+1'	Report	Vincent Bossou 43'
Penalties
Rachen Kunkhong (penalty scored); Wuttichai Soksen (penalty missed); Sitthichok Mool-on (penalty scored); Somkeat Ngamprom (penalty missed); Célio Guilherme da Silva Santos (penalty scored); Suton Kunlamai (penalty scored); Sumathee Suksai (penalty scored); Weerapong Lapkhaw (penalty scored)	6 – 5	(penalty scored) Giorgi Tsimakuridze; (penalty scored) Mitsada Saitaifah; (penalty scored) Irfan Chenae; (penalty missed) Anurak Kamonchit; (penalty missed) Phantep Chotikawin; (penalty scored) Akkarapol Meesawat; (penalty scored) Rushdan Katemmadee; (penalty missed) Napattanwat Kuiram

Phichit Provincial Stadium, Phichit
Attendance: 1,563
Referee: Worakit Panyoo (Thailand)

2–2 on aggregate. Wat Bot City won 6–5 on penalties.
