= 2019 Thai League 4 Champions League =

Thai League 4 Champions League

The champions league round was the next stage from the regional stage of 2019 Thai League 4. The winners and runners-ups of each regions would qualified to this round to finding 4 clubs promoting to 2020 Thai League 3.

== Teams ==
Locations of the 2019 Thai League 4 Champions League Teams
Upper Region
Lower Region

Team	Qualifying method
Uttaradit	Northern region champions
Wat Bot City	Northern region runners-up
Muang Loei United	Northeastern region champions
Huai Thalaeng United	Northeastern region runners-up
Bankhai United	Eastern region champions
Kohkwang	Eastern region runners-up
Hua Hin City	Western region champions
Chainat United	Western region runners-up
Satun United	Southern region champions
Pattani	Southern region runners-up
Pathumthani University	Bangkok Metropolitan region third place (Note: SCG Muangthong United (B) was the champions and Bangkok United (B) was the runners-up of Bangkok Metropolitan region but cannot promoted to champions league round by the rule of FA Thailand about reserve team. So, the third and fourth place of Bangkok Metropolitan region would qualified to champions league stage.)
Thonburi University	Bangkok Metropolitan region fourth place (Note: SCG Muangthong United (B) was the champions and Bangkok United (B) was the runners-up of Bangkok Metropolitan region but cannot promoted to champions league round by the rule of FA Thailand about reserve team. So, the third and fourth place of Bangkok Metropolitan region would qualified to champions league stage.)

== Group stage ==
=== Upper region ===
Pos	Team	Pld	W	D	L	GF	GA	GD	Pts	Qualification	WBC	MLU	BKU	KKG	UDT	HTU
1	Wat Bot City (Q, P)	5	4	0	1	12	5	+7	12	Qualification to knockout stage and promotion to 2020 Thai League 3	—	1–2	—	3–0	—	3–1
2	Muang Loei United (Q, P)	5	3	2	0	7	3	+4	11	Qualification to knockout stage and promotion to 2020 Thai League 3	—	—	3–1	0–0	1–0	—
3	Bankhai United	5	3	0	2	9	8	+1	9		1–3	—	—	2–0	—	3–2
4	Kohkwang	5	1	2	2	6	10	−4	5		—	—	—	—	3–3	3–2
5	Uttaradit	5	1	1	3	6	9	−3	4		1–2	—	0–2	—	—	—
6	Huai Thalaeng United	5	0	1	4	7	12	−5	1		—	1–1	—	—	1–2	—

Source: Thai League
Rules for classification: 1) Points; 2) Head-to-head points; 3) Goal difference; 4) Goals scored;).
(P) Promoted; (Q) Qualified for the phase indicated
14 September 2019
16:00 UTC+7

Muang Loei United	3 – 1	Bankhai United
Danuson Wijitpunya 24', 78'; Jiraphong Chaiyasaeng 90+5'	Report	Chokchai Sukthed 90'

Wang Saphung Stadium, Loei
Attendance: 579
Referee: Wiritpol Pleumsilp (Thailand)
14 September 2019
18:00 UTC+7

Wat Bot City	3 – 1	Huai Thalaeng United
Célio Guilherme da Silva Santos 31'; Sitthichok Mool-on 42'; Kunburus Sounses 75'	Report	Nopparat Auraikae 60'

Phitsanulok PAO. Stadium, Phitsanulok
Attendance: 519
Referee: Sakda Jitsupaworakul (Thailand)
14 September 2019
18:00 UTC+7

Kohkwang	3 – 3	Uttaradit
Rungsak Kodcharak 36'; Chatchai Narkwijit 44'; Chainarong Samuttha 55'	Report	Anucha Phantong 52'; Phichet Hawkongkeew 83'; Giuberty Silva Neves 90+3'

Chanthaburi Provincial Stadium, Chanthaburi
Attendance: 604
Referee: Anusorn Saengnet (Thailand)

22 September 2019
16:00 UTC+7

Muang Loei United	1 – 0	Uttaradit
Witthaya Thanawatcharasanti 90+4'	Report

Wang Saphung Stadium, Loei
Attendance: 939
Referee: Pichit Thongchanmool (Thailand)
22 September 2019
18:00 UTC+7

Bankhai United	3 – 2	Huai Thalaeng United
Chokchai Sukthed 6'; Ekue Andre Houma 64'; Tatree Seeha 66'	Report	Nopparat Auraikae 2'; Aphidet Aetyat 28'

Rayong Provincial Stadium, Rayong
Referee: Veeraporn Maophaeo (Thailand)
22 September 2019
18:00 UTC+7

Wat Bot City	3 – 0	Kohkwang
Sittichai Kumyat 10'; Kunburus Sounses 50'; Célio Guilherme da Silva Santos 73'	Report

Phitsanulok PAO. Stadium, Phitsanulok
Attendance: 791
Referee: Worakit Panyoo (Thailand)

28 September 2019
16:00 UTC+7

Bankhai United	2 – 0	Kohkwang
Weerapan Thongnak 55'; Ekue Andre Houma 65'	Report

Wai Krong Stadium, Rayong
Attendance: 250
Referee: Teeramate Pooprang (Thailand)
28 September 2019
16:00 UTC+7

Huai Thalaeng United	1 – 1	Muang Loei United
Nopparat Auraikae 33'	Report	Amronphun Homduang 85'

Suranaree University of Technology Stadium, Nakhon Ratchasima
Attendance: 243
Referee: Samrit Ritkaew (Thailand)
28 September 2019
18:00 UTC+7

Uttaradit	1 – 2	Wat Bot City
Phufah Chuenkomrak 88'	Report	Célio Guilherme da Silva Santos 50'; Natthawut Nueamai 51'

Uttaradit Provincial Stadium, Uttaradit
Attendance: 1,346
Referee: Trongkiat Changchan (Thailand)

6 October 2019
18:00 UTC+7

Wat Bot City	1 – 2	Muang Loei United
Naris Klaysub 29'	Report	Aphiwat Hanchai 78', 85'

Phichit Provincial Stadium, Phichit
Attendance: 1,805
Referee: Suchat Fangmala (Thailand)
6 October 2019
18:00 UTC+7

Uttaradit	0 – 2	Bankhai United
	Report	Ekue Andre Houma 52'; Michael Cain 56'

Uttaradit Provincial Stadium, Uttaradit
Referee: Somkhid Sarapim (Thailand)
6 October 2019
18:00 UTC+7

Kohkwang	3 – 2	Huai Thalaeng United
Chatchai Narkwijit 20'; Gan Kleabphueng 77'; Rattaporn Saetan 82'	Report	Issei Kikuchi 16'; Aliou Seck 39'

Chanthaburi Provincial Stadium, Chanthaburi
Attendance: 301
Referee: Thapakorn Thongkon (Thailand)

12 October 2019
16:00 UTC+7

Bankhai United	1 – 3	Wat Bot City
Tatree Seeha 47'	Report	Célio Guilherme da Silva Santos 22'; Kunburus Sounses 48'; Sittichai Kumyat 90+4'

Wai Krong Stadium, Rayong
Referee: Puttipong Isising (Thailand)
12 October 2019
16:00 UTC+7

Muang Loei United	0 – 0	Kohkwang
	Report

Wang Saphung Stadium, Loei
Attendance: 693
Referee: Satchukorn Saenchu (Thailand)
12 October 2019
16:00 UTC+7

Huai Thalaeng United	1 – 2	Uttaradit
Nopparat Auraikae 44' (pen.)	Report	Taku Ito 2'; Thanpol Chaiyasit 55'

Suranaree University of Technology Stadium, Nakhon Ratchasima
Attendance: 248
Referee: Sakda Jitsupaworakul (Thailand)

=== Lower region ===
Pos	Team	Pld	W	D	L	GF	GA	GD	Pts	Qualification	PTN	PTU	HHC	TBU	CNU	STU
1	Pattani (Q, P)	5	4	0	1	11	4	+7	12	Qualification to knockout stage and promotion to 2020 Thai League 3	—	—	2–0	4–1	4–2	—
2	Pathumthani University (Q, P)	5	3	2	0	9	5	+4	11	Qualification to knockout stage and promotion to 2020 Thai League 3	1–0	—	—	—	—	4–2
3	Hua Hin City	5	3	0	2	6	5	+1	9		—	0–1	—	1–0	—	—
4	Thonburi University	5	1	2	2	7	9	−2	5		—	2–2	—	—	3–1	—
5	Chainat United	5	1	1	3	7	11	−4	4		—	1–1	0–1	—	—	3–2
6	Satun United	5	0	1	4	7	13	−6	1		0–1	—	2–4	1–1	—	—

Source: Thai League
Rules for classification: 1) Points; 2) Head-to-head points; 3) Goal difference; 4) Goals scored;).
(P) Promoted; (Q) Qualified for the phase indicated
15 September 2019
16:00 UTC+7

Chainat United	3 – 2	Satun United
Thanayut Jittabud 32', 46'; Patay Nuwat 71'	Report	Caio Rodrigues da Cruz 23' (pen.); Alaan Bruno de Sousa e Santos 72'

Nong Mamong Stadium, Chainat
Attendance: 350
Referee: Teeramate Pooprang (Thailand)
15 September 2019
16:15 UTC+7

Pattani	4 – 1	Thonburi University
Mitsada Saitaifah 11'; Giorgi Tsimakuridze 29', 84'; Saibudin Da-oh 77'	Report	Sekou Sylla 88'

Pattani Provincial Stadium, Pattani
Attendance: 1,500
Referee: Teerachai Jumpa (Thailand)
15 September 2019
17:30 UTC+7

Hua Hin City	0 – 1	Pathumthani University
	Report	Diego Barrera 74'

Hua Hin Municipal Stadium, Prachuap Khiri Khan
Attendance: 350
Referee: Suchat Fangmala (Thailand)

21 September 2019
16:15 UTC+7

Pattani	2 – 0	Hua Hin City
Saibudin Da-oh 19'; Giorgi Tsimakuridze 90+1'	Report

Pattani Provincial Stadium, Pattani
Attendance: 2,000
Referee: Sakda Jitsupaworakul (Thailand)
21 September 2019
16:30 UTC+7

Satun United	1 – 1	Thonburi University
Alaan Bruno de Sousa e Santos 65'	Report	Emmanuel Nwachi 8'

Satun PAO. Stadium, Satun
Attendance: 1,800
Referee: Sarawut Pramottayakul (Thailand)
22 September 2019
18:00 UTC+7

Chainat United	1 – 1	Pathumthani University
Kittinut Nuamnimanong 90'	Report	Diego Barrera 77'

Khao Plong Stadium, Chainat
Attendance: 571
Referee: Suwat Wannakhan (Thailand)

29 September 2019
16:00 UTC+7

Pathumthani University	1 – 0	Pattani
Diego Barrera 89' (pen.)	Report

Ratchakram Stadium, Ayutthaya
Attendance: 129
Referee: Teerachai Jumpa (Thailand)
29 September 2019
16:15 UTC+7

Thonburi University	3 – 1	Chainat United
Piyaphong Phrueksupee 7'; Chatturong Longsriphum 77'; Sumetee Sae-song 90+1'	Report	Sere William Vieram'Boa 49'

Thonburi University Stadium, Bangkok
Attendance: 645
Referee: Satchukorn Saenchu (Thailand)
29 September 2019
16:30 UTC+7

Satun United	2 – 4	Hua Hin City
Alaan Bruno de Sousa e Santos 17'; Artit Promkun 70'	Report	Anon Kaimook 4', 8', 90'; Chatchai Phithanmet 39'

Satun PAO. Stadium, Satun
Attendance: 1,450
Referee: Somsuk Poosomnuek (Thailand)

5 October 2019
16:00 UTC+7

Pathumthani University	4 – 2	Satun United
Panupong Hawan 19'; Soumahoro Mafa 27'; Diego Barrera 31'; Promphong Kransumrong 45'	Report	Chamsuddeen Shoteng 42', 75'

Ratchakram Stadium, Ayutthaya
Attendance: 200
Referee: Wachirapan Prasomphon (Thailand)
5 October 2019
16:00 UTC+7

Pattani	4 – 2	Chainat United
Giorgi Tsimakuridze 35', 43', 45+1', 70'	Report	Thanongsak Promdad 30'; Nutthikorn Yaprom 76'

Pattani Provincial Stadium, Pattani
Attendance: 6,000
Referee: Somsuk Poosomnuek (Thailand)
5 October 2019
17:30 UTC+7

Hua Hin City	1 – 0	Thonburi University
Songran Pungnoy 78'	Report

Hua Hin Municipal Stadium, Prachuap Khiri Khan
Attendance: 350
Referee: Mahama Awae (Thailand)

13 October 2019
16:00 UTC+7

Chainat United	0 – 1	Hua Hin City
	Report	Anon Kaimook 84'

Khao Plong Stadium, Chainat
Attendance: 150
Referee: Suchin Khewsopa (Thailand)
13 October 2019
16:00 UTC+7

Satun United	0 – 1	Pattani
	Report	Rushdan Katemmadee 34'

Satun PAO. Stadium, Satun
Attendance: 855
Referee: Sulaiman Mamah (Thailand)
13 October 2019
16:00 UTC+7

Thonburi University	2 – 2	Pathumthani University
Chalongchai Thanthep 37'; Piyaphong Phrueksupee 55'	Report	Diego Barrera 14'; Bundit Paponpai 54'

Thonburi University Stadium, Bangkok
Attendance: 465
Referee: Nikorn Khantharsorn (Thailand)

== Knockout stage ==
Winners, runners-up, third place, and fourth place of 2019 Thai League 4 would promoted to 2020 Thai League 3.

=== Third place play-off ===
==== Summary ====
Team 1	Agg.	Team 2	1st leg	2nd leg
Pathumthani University	3–7	Muang Loei United	1–4	2–3

==== Matches ====
19 October 2019
16:00 UTC+7

Pathumthani University	1 – 4	Muang Loei United
Phontakorn Thosanthiah 87'	Report	Danuson Wijitpunya 2', 54'; Patipat Kamsat 25'; Wirachai Buayalraksa 85'

Ratchakram Stadium, Ayutthaya
Attendance: 250
Referee: Sarawut Pramottayakul (Thailand)
26 October 2019
16:00 UTC+7

Muang Loei United	3 – 2	Pathumthani University
Patipat Kamsat 13'; Danuson Wijitpunya 62', 87'	Report	Promphong Kransumrong 6', 34'

Wang Saphung Stadium, Loei
Attendance: 227
Referee: Suchin Khewsopa (Thailand)

Muang Loei United won 7–3 on aggregate.

=== Final ===
==== Summary ====
Team 1	Agg.	Team 2	1st leg	2nd leg
Pattani	2–2 (5–6 p)	Wat Bot City	1–1	1–1 (a.e.t.) (5–6 p)

==== Matches ====
20 October 2019
16:00 UTC+7

Pattani	1 – 1	Wat Bot City
Apirat Heemkhao 54'	Report	Natthawut Nueamai 2'

Pattani Provincial Stadium, Pattani
Attendance: 7,500
Referee: Sakda Jitsupaworakul (Thailand)
27 October 2019
18:00 UTC+7

Wat Bot City	1 – 1 (a.e.t.)	Pattani
Célio Guilherme da Silva Santos 90+1'	Report	Vincent Bossou 43'
Penalties
Rachen Kunkhong (penalty scored); Wuttichai Soksen (penalty missed); Sitthichok Mool-on (penalty scored); Somkeat Ngamprom (penalty missed); Célio Guilherme da Silva Santos (penalty scored); Suton Kunlamai (penalty scored); Sumathee Suksai (penalty scored); Weerapong Lapkhaw (penalty scored)	6 – 5	(penalty scored) Giorgi Tsimakuridze; (penalty scored) Mitsada Saitaifah; (penalty scored) Irfan Chenae; (penalty missed) Anurak Kamonchit; (penalty missed) Phantep Chotikawin; (penalty scored) Akkarapol Meesawat; (penalty scored) Rushdan Katemmadee; (penalty missed) Napattanwat Kuiram

Phichit Provincial Stadium, Phichit
Attendance: 1,563
Referee: Worakit Panyoo (Thailand)

2–2 on aggregate. Wat Bot City won 6–5 on penalties.

== Teams promoted to 2020 Thai League 3 ==
- Wat Bot City (champions)
- Pattani (runners-up)
- Muang Loei United (Third-placed)
- Pathumthani University (Fourth-placed)
