= 2019 Thai League 4 Western Region =

Thai League 4 Western Region
- Season: 2019
- Dates: 9 February 2019 – 31 August 2019
- Champions: Hua Hin City
- Relegated: Look E San
- T4 Champions League: Hua Hin City; Chainat United
- Matches played: 108
- Goals scored: 327 (3.03 per match)
- Top goalscorer: (Thailand) Sutin Iamsa-ard (11 goals; Hua Hin City) (Thailand) Suriyakarn Chimjeen (11 goals; Saraburi United)
- Biggest home win: 7 goals difference Hua Hin City 7–0 Ratchaburi Mitr Phol (B) (27 April 2019)
- Biggest away win: 7 goals difference Ratchaburi Mitr Phol (B) 0–7 Assumption United (9 June 2019)
- Highest scoring: 11 goals Chainat United 3–8 Look E San (1 June 2019)
- Longest winning run: 6 matches Assumption United
- Longest unbeaten run: 14 matches Assumption United
- Longest winless run: 11 matches Saraburi United
- Longest losing run: 10 matches Ratchaburi Mitr Phol (B)
- Highest attendance: 1,435; Saraburi United 1–1 Chainat Hornbill (B) (2 March 2019)
- Lowest attendance: 37; Samut Songkhram 2–0 IPE Samut Sakhon United (31 July 2019)
- Total attendance: 26,279
- Average attendance: 250

The 2019 Thai League 4 Western region is a region in the regional stage of the 2019 Thai League 4. A total of 9 teams located in Western, Central, and Bangkok Metropolitan Region of Thailand will compete in the league of the Western region.

== Teams ==
=== Number of teams by province ===
Position	Province	Number	Teams
1	Chai Nat	2	Chainat Hornbill (B) and Chainat United
2	Bangkok	1	Assumption United
2	Nonthaburi	1	Look E San
2	Prachuap Khiri Khan	1	Hua Hin City
2	Ratchaburi	1	Ratchaburi Mitr Phol (B)
2	Samut Sakhon	1	IPE Samut Sakhon United
2	Samut Songkhram	1	Samut Songkhram
2	Saraburi	1	Saraburi United

=== Stadiums and locations ===
Locations of the 2019 Thai League 4 Western region teams
Locations of teams in Bangkok Metropolitan region

Team	Location	Stadium	Coordinates
Assumption United	Bangkok (Bang Khae)	Assumption College Thonburi Stadium	13°44′03″N 100°22′14″E
Chainat Hornbill (B)	Chainat (Mueang)	Khao Plong Stadium	15°13′09″N 100°09′20″E
Chainat United	Chainat (Nong Mamong)	Nong Mamong Stadium	15°16′26″N 99°52′05″E
Hua Hin City	Prachuap Khiri Khan (Hua Hin)	Hua Hin Municipal Stadium	12°31′37″N 99°58′10″E
IPE Samut Sakhon United	Samut Sakhon (Mueang)	IPE Samut Sakhon Stadium	13°32′30″N 100°16′52″E
Look E San	Nonthaburi (Mueang)	Nonthaburi Youth Centre Stadium	13°52′44″N 100°32′39″E
Ratchaburi Mitr Phol (B)	Ratchaburi (Pak Tho)	Pak Tho Municipality Stadium	13°22′15″N 99°50′51″E
Samut Songkhram	Samut Songkhram (Mueang)	Samut Songkhram Stadium	13°24′51″N 100°00′00″E
Saraburi United	Saraburi (Mueang)	Saraburi Stadium	14°33′24″N 100°54′17″E

== League table ==
=== Standings ===
Pos	Team	Pld	W	D	L	GF	GA	GD	Pts	Qualification or relegation
1	Hua Hin City (Q)	24	17	2	5	52	16	+36	53	Qualification to the Champions League stage
2	Chainat United (Q)	24	16	3	5	53	29	+24	51	Qualification to the Champions League stage
3	Assumption United	24	14	4	6	44	30	+14	46	
4	Saraburi United	24	9	7	8	41	34	+7	34	
5	Chainat Hornbill (B)	24	9	3	12	37	35	+2	30	
6	Samut Songkhram	24	7	5	12	27	40	−13	26 (Note: Samut Songkhram ahead on head-to-head record; Samut Songkhram 9 pts, IPE Samut Sakhon United 0 pts.)	
7	IPE Samut Sakhon United	24	7	5	12	25	45	−20	26	
8	Look E San (R)	24	5	8	11	23	30	−7	23	Relegation to the 2020 Thailand Amateur League
9	Ratchaburi Mitr Phol (B)	24	3	5	16	25	68	−43	14	Suspension in 2020 season

Source: Thai League
Rules for classification: 1) Points; 2) Head-to-head points; 3) Head-to-head goal difference; 4) Head-to-head goal scored; 5) Overall goal difference; 6) Overall goal scored; 7) Fair play points; 8) Play-off without extra time).
(Q) Qualified for the phase indicated; (R) Relegated

=== Positions by round ===
Qualification to the Champions League stage
Relegation to the 2020 Thailand Amateur League

Team ╲ Round	1	2	3	4	5	6	7	8	9	10	11	12	13	14	15	16	17	18	19	20	21	22	23	24	25	26	27
Hua Hin City	2	1	1	1	1	2	2	2	1	1	1	2	1	1	2	2	2	1	1	2	1	2	2	3	2	2	1
Chainat United	4	3	5	3	2	1	1	1	2	2	2	1	2	2	1	1	1	3	3	3	3	3	3	2	1	1	2
Assumption United	3	5	2	2	3	3	3	3	3	3	3	3	3	3	3	3	3	2	2	1	2	1	1	1	3	3	3
Saraburi United	5	6	7	7	9	9	9	9	9	9	9	9	9	9	8	9	6	7	7	7	7	6	5	5	4	4	4
Chainat Hornbill (B)	7	8	8	8	6	4	5	7	5	5	5	4	7	7	7	5	4	4	4	4	4	4	4	4	5	5	5
Samut Songkhram	8	7	4	4	5	7	7	5	6	8	8	5	5	5	6	7	8	9	9	8	8	7	7	7	8	7	6
IPE Samut Sakhon United	6	4	6	6	8	6	4	4	4	4	4	6	6	6	5	8	9	6	6	6	6	8	8	8	7	8	7
Look E San	1	2	3	5	4	5	6	8	7	6	6	7	4	4	4	4	5	5	5	5	5	5	6	6	6	6	8
Ratchaburi Mitr Phol (B)	9*	9*	9*	9*	7	8	8	6	8	7	7	8	8	8	9*	6	7	8	8	9*	9*	9*	9*	9*	9*	9*	9*

Source: Thai League

Notes:
* The reserve of T1 and T2 teams also known as team (B) could not qualify and relegated, so that the teams in lower or upper positions would be qualified or relegated.

=== Results by round ===
Team ╲ Round	1	2	3	4	5	6	7	8	9	10	11	12	13	14	15	16	17	18	19	20	21	22	23	24	25	26	27
Hua Hin City	W	W	W	W	L	N	W	D	W	W	L	L	W	W	N	D	W	W	W	L	W	L	W	N	W	W	W
Chainat United	D	W	L	W	W	W	W	W	N	D	D	W	L	W	W	W	L	N	W	L	L	W	W	W	W	W	N
Assumption United	W	L	W	W	L	W	N	L	D	W	W	D	D	W	W	N	W	W	W	W	D	W	W	L	N	L	L
Saraburi United	D	N	D	L	L	L	D	L	D	D	N	D	L	W	W	L	W	L	L	N	W	W	W	D	W	W	W
Chainat Hornbill (B)	L	L	D	N	W	W	L	L	W	L	D	D	N	L	L	W	W	W	L	W	L	N	L	W	L	W	L
Samut Songkhram	L	D	W	D	N	L	L	W	L	L	D	W	D	N	L	L	L	L	L	D	W	W	N	L	L	W	W
IPE Samut Sakhon United	N	W	L	L	L	W	W	D	D	N	D	L	D	L	L	L	L	W	N	W	L	L	L	D	W	L	W
Look E San	W	D	L	L	W	L	L	N	D	D	D	D	W	L	W	D	N	L	W	D	D	L	L	L	L	N	L
Ratchaburi Mitr Phol (B)	L	L	N	D	W	L	D	W	L	D	D	N	D	L	L	W	L	L	L	L	N	L	L	L	L	L	L

N = No match; W = Won; D = Drawn; L = Lost

=== Results ===
For the Western region, a total 24 matches per team competing in 3 legs. In the 3rd leg, the winner on head-to-head result of the 1st and the 2nd leg will be home team. If head-to-head result are tie, must to find the home team from head-to-head goals different. If all of head-to-head still tie, must to find the home team from penalty kickoff on the end of each 2nd leg match (This penalty kickoff don't bring to calculate points on league table, it's only the process to find the home team in 3rd leg).

Home \ Away	ASU	CNH	CNU	HHC	ISU	LES	RBM	SKM	SBU	ASU	CNH	CNU	HHC	ISU	LES	RBM	SKM	SBU
Assumption United	—	1–0	0–1	2–0	0–0	3–1	0–4	5–0	2–1	—	1–0	2–5	4–2	2–1	0–0	2–0	1–2	0–5
Chainat Hornbill (B)	1–2	—	0–0	2–0	1–2	0–1	4–0	4–2	3–3	—	—	—	—	0–2	2–0	3–0	2–5	—
Chainat United	1–2	3–2	—	1–2	2–0	3–8	5–0	2–1	1–1	—	0–1	—	0–1	7–2	—	2–1	4–1	2–1
Hua Hin City	3–1	3–0	0–2	—	3–0	3–0	7–0	1–0	4–0	—	2–0	—	—	3–0	3–1	5–0	2–0	1–2
IPE Samut Sakhon United	1–3	0–4	0–1	1–1	—	2–1	3–1	0–1	2–1	—	—	—	—	—	1–0	1–0	—	—
Look E San	1–1	1–2	0–1	0–0	0–0	—	0–0	0–0	0–1	—	—	1–3	—	—	—	2–1	—	1–3
Ratchaburi Mitr Phol (B)	0–7	4–3	1–3	0–2	2–2	1–4	—	1–1	2–1	—	—	—	—	—	—	—	2–3	1–4
Samut Songkhram	1–3	0–1	0–2	0–2	3–0	0–0	3–3	—	1–0	—	—	—	—	2–0	0–0	—	—	—
Saraburi United	0–0	1–1	2–2	0–2	4–2	0–1	1–1	2–0	—	—	2–1	—	—	3–3	—	—	3–1	—

Source: Thai League
Legend: Blue = home team win; Yellow = draw; Red = away team win.
For upcoming matches, an "a" indicates there is an article about the rivalry between the two participants.

== Season statistics ==
=== Top scorers by team ===
Position	Teams	Name	Goals
1	Hua Hin City	(Thailand) Sutin Iamsa-ard	11
1	Saraburi United	(Thailand) Suriyakarn Chimjeen	11
3	Chainat United	(Thailand) Thanayut Jittabud	10
4	Assumption United	(Japan) Akira Niiho	9
4	Assumption United	(Thailand) Jakkrit Senkaew	9
4	Assumption United	(Thailand) Surawut Sutthisak	9
7	Chainat Hornbill (B)	(Thailand) Weraphat Kaewongsa	7
7	Samut Songkhram	(Thailand) Sittichai Pankoo	7
9	IPE Samut Sakhon United	(Thailand) Kittin Duangket	5
9	Ratchaburi Mitr Phol (B)	(Thailand) Yotsak Chaowana	5
11	Look E San	(Thailand) Noppadol Juijaiherm	3
11	Look E San	(Thailand) Piranun Kerdsorn	3
11	Look E San	(Thailand) Thanakorn Pheuansopa	3

== Attendances ==
=== Overall statistical table ===
Pos	Team	Total	High	Low	Average	Change
1	Saraburi United	7,950	1,435	290	723	n/a
2	Hua Hin City	3,830	530	200	295	+24.5%
3	IPE Samut Sakhon United	2,376	400	150	238	+72.5%
4	Look E San	2,276	500	100	207	+42.8%
5	Ratchaburi Mitr Phol (B)	2,074	429	72	207	n/a
6	Assumption United	2,945	425	85	184	+15.7%
7	Chainat United	2,192	250	102	157	−16.0%
8	Samut Songkhram	1,342	250	37	149	−32.3%
9	Chainat Hornbill (B)	1,294	140	78	117	−29.1%
	League total	26,279	1,435	37	250	−14.7%

Source: Thai League

=== Attendances by home match played ===
Team \ Match played	1	2	3	4	5	6	7	8	9	10	11	12	13	14	15	16	Total
Assumption United	170	185	132	105	170	253	182	425	160	150	150	180	120	324	85	154	2,945
Chainat Hornbill (B)	140	Unk.1	125	105	150	135	115	125	78	128	95	98					1,294
Chainat United	250	120	120	102	120	120	120	175	250	150	135	160	170	200			2,192
Hua Hin City	250	530	250	300	200	200	Unk.3	250	250	250	200	300	350	500			3,830
IPE Samut Sakhon United	150	150	300	200	176	200	200	300	300	400							2,376
Look E San	500	100	100	109	150	200	350	150	115	300	202						2,276
Ratchaburi Mitr Phol (B)	74	233	300	429	250	150	325	83	158	72							2,074
Samut Songkhram	210	150	116	174	250	Unk.2	150	150	105	37							1,342
Saraburi United	1,435	1,105	772	544	290	455	578	618	523	625	1,005						7,950

Source: Thai League Note:
Unk.1 Some error of T4 official match report 6 April 2019 (Chainat Hornbill (B) 1–2 IPE Samut Sakhon United).
Unk.2 Some error of T4 official match report 1 June 2019 (Samut Songkhram 3–3 Ratchaburi Mitr Phol (B)).
Unk.3 Some error of T4 official match report 8 June 2019 (Hua Hin City 3–0 Chainat Hornbill (B)).

== See also ==
- 2019 Thai League 1
- 2019 Thai League 2
- 2019 Thai League 3
- 2019 Thai League 4
- 2019 Thailand Amateur League
- 2019 Thai FA Cup
- 2019 Thai League Cup
- 2019 Thailand Champions Cup
