= List of football stadiums in Thailand =

This is a list of football stadiums in Thailand. Currently, stadiums with a capacity of 5,000 or more are included. The largest non-football stadium in Thailand is the 12,000-capacity indoor stadium named Bangkok Arena.

== Current stadiums ==
#	Image	Stadium	Capacity	City	Home team(s)	Opened
1		Rajamangala Stadium	48,000	Bangkok	Thailand national football team	1998
2		Chang Arena	32,600	Buriram	Buriram United	2011
3		Tinsulanon Stadium	30,000	Songkhla	Songkhla	1995
4		Suphanburi Municipality Stadium	25,000	Suphanburi	Suphanburi	1947
5		Dhupatemiya Stadium	25,000	Pathumthani	Royal Thai Air Force	
6		Chira Nakhon Stadium	25,000	Songkhla		1944
7		80th Birthday Stadium	24,641	Nakhon Ratchasima	Nakhon Ratchasima	2007
8		Thai Army Sports Stadium	20,000	Bangkok		2012
9		Chulalongkorn University Stadium	20,000	Bangkok	Chamchuri United	
10		Suphachalasai Stadium	19,793	Bangkok	Thailand national football team	1935
11		Thammasat Stadium	19,500	Pathumthani	Dome	1998
12		700th Anniversary Stadium	17,909	Chiangmai	Chiangmai United	1995
13		True BG Stadium	15,114	Pathumthani	BG Pathum United, Bangkok United	2010
14		Thunderdome Stadium	15,000	Nonthaburi	Muangthong United	1998
15		PTT Stadium	15,000	Rayong		2012
16		Singha Chiangrai Stadium	15,000	Chiangrai	Chiangrai United, Chiangrai City	2012
17		Surakul Stadium	15,000	Phuket		
18		Phichit Stadium	15,000	Phichit		
19		Nakhon Sawan Stadium	15,000	Nakhon Sawan		
20		Khao Kradong Stadium	14,000	Buriram		2010
21		Kleab Bua Stadium	13,000	Kanchanaburi	Kanchanaburi Power	2009
22		Mitr Phol Stadium	13,000	Ratchaburi	Ratchaburi	2016
23		Sattahip Navy Stadium	12,500	Chonburi	Navy, Marines	2001
24		Nong Bua Lamphu Province Stadium	12,000	Nong Bua Lam Phu	Nongbua Pitchaya	
25		Chainat Stadium	12,000	Chainat	Chainat Hornbill	2011
26		IPE Chonburi Stadium	12,000	Chonburi		2010
27		Surat Thani Stadium	10,175	Surat Thani		
28		Ang Thong Provincial Stadium	10,000	Ang Thong	Ang Thong	
29		72-years Anniversary Stadium	10,000	Bangkok	Bangkok Women's	2010
30		Ratchaburi Stadium	10,000	Ratchaburi		
31		Sri Nakhon Lamduan Stadium	10,000	Sisaket	Sisaket United	
32		Nonthaburi Province Stadium	10,000	Nonthaburi	Nonthaburi United	2016
33		Tung Burapha Stadium	10,000	Ubon Ratchathani		
34		SAT Stadium Udon Thani	10,000	Udon Thani		2018
35		Chonburi Stadium	8,000	Chonburi	Chonburi	2010
36		Chalerm Phrakiat Bang Mod Stadium	8,000	Bangkok	Bangkok	1988
37		Khon Kaen Stadium	8,000	Khon Kaen	Khonkaen, Khon Kaen United	
38		Thung Thalay Luang Stadium	8,000	Sukhothai	Sukhothai	2014
39		Krabi Provincial Stadium	8,000	Krabi	Krabi	
40		Narathiwat Provincial Administrative Organization Stadium	8,000	Narathiwat	Nara United	
41		Rainbow Stadium	8,000	Pattani	Pattani	
42		Rayong Stadium	7,500	Rayong	Rayong	
43		Ranong Province Stadium	7,212	Ranong	Ranong United	
44		Sam Ao Stadium	7,000	Prachuap Khiri Khan	Prachuap	
45		Thai-Japanese Stadium	6,600	Bangkok		1982
46		Institute of Physical Education Samut Sakhon Stadium	6,378	Samut Sakhon	Samut Sakhon City	
47		Thephasadin Stadium	6,378	Bangkok		
48		PAT Stadium	6,250	Bangkok	Port	1967
49		Saraburi Stadium	6,000	Saraburi	Saraburi	
50		Nonthaburi Youth Centre Stadium	6,000	Nonthaburi	VRN Muangnont	
51		Samut Songkhram Stadium	6,000	Samut Songkhram		
52		Ayutthaya Province Stadium	6,000	Ayutthaya	Ayutthaya United	
53		Trat Province Stadium	6,000	Trat	Trat	
54		Chachoengsao Town municipality Stadium	6,000	Chachoengsao	Cha Choeng Sao	
55		Kalasin Town municipality Stadium	6,000	Kalasin		
56		Rambhai Barni Rajabhat University Stadium	6,000	Chanthaburi		
57		Sanam Chan Palace Sports Stadium	6,000	Nakhon Pathom		
58		UMT Stadium	6,000	Ubon Ratchathani		2017
59		Sri Narong Stadium	5,673	Surin	Surin City	1994
60		Nong Prue Stadium	5,500	Chonburi	Pattaya United, BFB Pattaya City	1999
61		Lampang Provincial Stadium	5,500	Lampang	Lampang	
62		Phra Ramesuan Stadium	5,500	Lopburi	Lopburi	
63		Princess Sirindhorn Stadium	5,207	Chonburi		
64		Samut Prakarn SAT Stadium	5,100	Samut Prakan	Samut Prakan	2015
65		NT Stadium	5,000	Bangkok		2010
66		Bangkokthonburi University Stadium	5,000	Bangkok		
67		84 Birthday Anniversary of His Majesty the King Sport Club	5,000	Bangkok		
68		Saharue industrial factory field	5,000	Mukdahan		
69		Chiangrai Province Stadium	5,000	Chiang Rai		
70		BEC Tero Sasana Nong Chok Stadium	5,000	Bangkok		
71		Chalerm Prakiat Klong 6 Stadium	5,000	Pathum Thani		
72		Mahanakorn UNI Stadium	5,000	Bangkok		
73		Lamphun Warriors Stadium	5,000	Lamphun	Lamphun Warriors	2024
74		Chanthaburi Province Stadium	5,000	Chanthaburi	Chanthaburi	
75		Nakhon Si Thammarat Province Stadium	5,000	Nakhon Si Thammarat	Nakhon Si United	
76		Nakhon Sawan Sports School Stadium	5,000	Nakhon Sawan	Nakhon Sawan See Khwae City	

== See also ==
- List of Asian stadiums by capacity
- List of association football stadiums by capacity
- Lists of stadiums
