= 2022–23 Thai League 3 Western Region =

Thai League 3 Western Region
- Season: 2022–23
- Dates: 10 September 2022 – 19 March 2023
- Champions: Dragon Pathumwan Kanchanaburi
- Relegated: Thawi Watthana Samut Sakhon United
- T3 National Championship: Dragon Pathumwan Kanchanaburi; Samut Songkhram
- Matches: 132
- Goals: 418 (3.17 per match)
- Top goalscorer: (Thailand) Chitsanuphong Phimpsang (16 goals; Hua Hin City)
- Best goalkeeper: (Thailand) Anusorn Chansod (6 clean sheets; Chainat United) (Thailand) Peradach Bunkame (6 clean sheets; Dragon Pathumwan Kanchanaburi)
- Biggest home win: 7 goals difference Dragon Pathumwan Kanchanaburi 7–0 Thawi Watthana Samut Sakhon United (4 February 2023)
- Biggest away win: 6 goals difference Thawi Watthana Samut Sakhon United 2–8 Pathumthani University (1 October 2022); Thawi Watthana Samut Sakhon United 1–7 Hua Hin City (8 January 2023)
- Highest scoring: 10 goals Thawi Watthana Samut Sakhon United 2–8 Pathumthani University (1 October 2022); Dragon Pathumwan Kanchanaburi 4–6 Hua Hin City (8 October 2022)
- Longest winning run: 8 matches Dragon Pathumwan Kanchanaburi
- Longest unbeaten run: 10 matches Samut Songkhram
- Longest winless run: 12 matches Thawi Watthana Samut Sakhon United
- Longest losing run: 8 matches Thawi Watthana Samut Sakhon United
- Highest attendance: 2,230; Kanchanaburi City 1–0 Dragon Pathumwan Kanchanaburi (2 October 2022)
- Lowest attendance: 1 Lopburi City 3–4 Dragon Pathumwan Kanchanaburi (14 January 2023)
- Total attendance: 29,896
- Average attendance: 238

The 2022–23 Thai League 3 Western region is a region in the regional stage of the 2022–23 Thai League 3. The tournament was sponsored by Kongsalak Plus, and known as the Kongsalak Plus League for sponsorship purposes. A total of 12 teams located in Western and Central of Thailand will compete in the league of the Western region.

== Teams ==
=== Number of teams by province ===
Position	Province	Number	Teams
1	Kanchanaburi	2	Dragon Pathumwan Kanchanaburi and Kanchanaburi City
2	Ang Thong	1	Angthong
2	Bangkok	1	Assumption United
2	Chai Nat	1	Chainat United
2	Lopburi	1	Lopburi City
2	Pathum Thani	1	Kanjanapat
2	Phra Nakhon Si Ayutthaya	1	Pathumthani University
2	Prachuap Khiri Khan	1	Hua Hin City
2	Samut Sakhon	1	Thawi Watthana Samut Sakhon United
2	Samut Songkhram	1	Samut Songkhram
2	Saraburi	1	Saraburi United

=== Stadiums and locations ===
Locations of the 2022–23 Thai League 3 Western region teams

Team	Location	Stadium	Coordinates
Angthong	Angthong (Mueang)	Angthong PAO. Stadium	14°37′45″N 100°27′07″E
Assumption United	Bangkok (Bang Khae)	Wongprachanukul Stadium	13°44′03″N 100°22′14″E
Chainat United	Chainat (Nong Mamong)	Nong Mamong Stadium	15°16′26″N 99°52′05″E
Dragon Pathumwan Kanchanaburi	Kanchanaburi (Mueang)	Kanchanaburi Municipality Stadium	14°01′13″N 99°31′17″E
Hua Hin City	Prachuap Khiri Khan (Hua Hin)	Hua Hin Municipal Stadium	12°31′37″N 99°58′10″E
Kanchanaburi City	Kanchanaburi (Tha Muang)	Khao Noi SAO. Stadium	13°57′48″N 99°35′35″E
Kanjanapat	Pathum Thani (Khlong Luang)	Stadium of Valaya Alongkorn Rajabhat University under the Royal Patronage	14°08′00″N 100°36′25″E
Lopburi City	Lopburi (Mueang)	Phra Ramesuan Stadium	14°48′03″N 100°38′52″E
Pathumthani University	Ayutthaya (Bang Sai)	Ratchakram Stadium	14°10′09″N 100°31′45″E
Samut Songkhram	Samut Songkhram (Mueang)	Samut Songkhram PAO. Stadium	13°24′51″N 100°00′00″E
Saraburi United	Saraburi (Mueang)	Saraburi PAO. Stadium	14°33′24″N 100°54′17″E
Thawi Watthana Samut Sakhon United	Samut Sakhon (Mueang)	Stadium of Thailand National Sports University, Samut Sakhon Campus	13°32′30″N 100°16′52″E

Locations of teams in Bangkok Metropolitan region

=== Foreign players ===
A T3 team could register 3 foreign players from foreign players all around the world. A team can use 3 foreign players on the field in each game.

Note :
(substituted off) : players who released during second leg transfer window;
(substituted in) : players who registered during second leg transfer window.

AFC member countries players.
CAF member countries players.
CONCACAF member countries players.
CONMEBOL member countries players.
OFC member countries players.
UEFA member countries players.
No foreign player registered.

Club	Leg	Player 1	Player 2	Player 3
Angthong	1st	(Egypt) Isalam Osama Ibrahim Abdelkarim (substituted off)	(Ghana) Eric Kumi	(Japan) Yuta Mishima
Angthong	2nd	(United States) Akinori Claude Mollenthiel (substituted in)	(Ghana) Eric Kumi	(Japan) Yuta Mishima
Assumption United	1st
Assumption United	2nd
Chainat United	1st		(Australia) Da Poe Da	(Japan) Tatsuhide Shimizu
Chainat United	2nd	(Ghana) Ozor Enoch (substituted in)	(Australia) Da Poe Da	(Japan) Tatsuhide Shimizu
Dragon Pathumwan Kanchanaburi	1st	(Brazil) Lucas Massaro Garcia Gama (substituted off)	(Russia) Sergei Tumasyan	(Japan) Taiga Matsunaga
Dragon Pathumwan Kanchanaburi	2nd	(Brazil) Artur (substituted in)	(Russia) Sergei Tumasyan	(Japan) Taiga Matsunaga
Hua Hin City	1st	(Ivory Coast) Joseph Louis Kissi (substituted off)	(Senegal) Ndiogou Ba (substituted off)	(Senegal) Babacar Ba (substituted off)
Hua Hin City	2nd		(Brazil) Carlos Eduardo dos Santos Lima (substituted in)	(Brazil) Sidibé Aziz Ben Saïdou (substituted in)
Kanchanaburi City	1st	(Ghana) Ozor Enoch (substituted off)	(United States) Kapaw Htoo (substituted off)	(Myanmar) Than Paing
Kanchanaburi City	2nd		(Nigeria) Pascal Ifeanyi Eke (substituted in)	(Myanmar) Than Paing
Kanjanapat	1st	(France) Zady Moise Gnenegbe (substituted off)	(United States) Bawi Uk Lian Phutin (substituted off)	(United States) Christian Joseph Sacchini
Kanjanapat	2nd	(Brazil) Josimar Tiago da Silva (substituted in)	(Iran) Saeid Chahjouei (substituted in)	(United States) Christian Joseph Sacchini
Lopburi City	1st			(Cameroon) Ahmadou Tidjani
Lopburi City	2nd	(Republic of the Congo) Olabayo Gbenga Samuel (substituted in)	(Republic of the Congo) Simba Masala (substituted in)	(Cameroon) Ahmadou Tidjani
Pathumthani University	1st	(Brazil) Josimar Tiago da Silva (substituted off)	(Argentina) Alexis Vaiani (substituted off)	(Belize) Giuberty Silva Neves (substituted off)
Pathumthani University	2nd		(Nigeria) Ekene Victor Azike (substituted in)	(South Korea) Heo Seung-min (substituted in)
Samut Songkhram	1st	(Brazil) Raphael de Oliveira Manhães (substituted off)	(Brazil) Jhonatan Bernardo (substituted off)	(Iran) Mohammad Reza Rokni (substituted off)
Samut Songkhram	2nd		(Ivory Coast) Kouassi Yao Hermann (substituted in)	(Russia) Evgeni Kabaev (substituted in)
Saraburi United	1st		(South Korea) Kim Jun-hyeon (substituted off)	(South Korea) Kim Deok
Saraburi United	2nd	(Ivory Coast) Bouda Henry Ismaël (substituted in)	(Egypt) Morsy Mohamed (substituted in)	(South Korea) Kim Deok
Thawi Watthana Samut Sakhon United	1st	(Ivory Coast) Ange Didier Merveil Kere (substituted off)	(Guinea) Sékou Nana Sylla (substituted off)	(Argentina) Lucas Daniel Echenique
Thawi Watthana Samut Sakhon United	2nd	(Uruguay) Diego Silva (substituted in)	(India) Gaurav Pandey (substituted in)	(Argentina) Lucas Daniel Echenique

== League table ==
=== Standings ===
Pos	Team	Pld	W	D	L	GF	GA	GD	Pts	Qualification or relegation
1	Dragon Pathumwan Kanchanaburi (C, Q)	22	17	1	4	69	26	+43	52 (Note: The head-to-head record is tied; Dragon Pathumwan Kanchanaburi 3 pts (GD 0), Samut Songkhram 3 pts (GD 0). Dragon Pathumwan Kanchanaburi is ahead on the overall goals difference.)	Qualification to the National Championship stage
2	Samut Songkhram (Q, R)	22	16	4	2	42	22	+20	52	Qualification to the National Championship stage and relegation to the Thailand Semi-Pro League
3	Hua Hin City	22	13	2	7	47	28	+19	41 (Note: Hua Hin City is ahead on the head-to-head points record; Hua Hin City 4 pts, Kanchanaburi City 1 pt.)	
4	Kanchanaburi City	22	12	5	5	28	21	+7	41	
5	Chainat United	22	10	5	7	36	28	+8	35	
6	Angthong	22	9	4	9	35	30	+5	31	
7	Pathumthani University	22	8	4	10	31	32	−1	28 (Note: Pathumthani University is ahead on the head-to-head record; Pathumthani University 3 pts (GD +1), Saraburi United 3 pts (GD -1).)	
8	Saraburi United	22	8	4	10	29	33	−4	28	
9	Assumption United	22	5	6	11	33	48	−15	21 (Note: Assumption United is ahead on the head-to-head points record; Assumption United 4 pts, Kanjanapat 1 pt.)	
10	Kanjanapat	22	5	6	11	30	37	−7	21	
11	Lopburi City	22	4	4	14	25	39	−14	16	
12	Thawi Watthana Samut Sakhon United (R)	22	1	3	18	13	74	−61	6	Relegation to the Thailand Semi-Pro League

Source: Thai League
Rules for classification: 1) Points; 2) Head-to-head points; 3) Head-to-head goal difference; 4) Head-to-head goal scored; 5) Overall goal difference; 6) Overall goal scored; 7) Fair play points; 8) Play-off without extra time).
(C) Champions; (Q) Qualified for the phase indicated; (R) Relegated

=== Positions by round ===
Team ╲ Round	1	2	3	4	5	6	7	8	9	10	11	12	13	14	15	16	17	18	19	20	21	22
Dragon Pathumwan Kanchanaburi	7	9	6	9	9	8	6	5	5	2	2	2	1	2	2	2	2	2	2	2	1	1
Samut Songkhram	3	1	1	1	1	1	1	1	1	1	1	1	2	1	1	1	1	1	1	1	2	2
Hua Hin City	10	6	8	6	6	2	2	2	2	3	3	3	3	3	4	3	3	3	3	3	3	3
Kanchanaburi City	2	3	7	4	3	5	5	3	3	5	4	4	4	4	3	5	5	4	5	4	4	4
Chainat United	6	11	10	11	11	11	11	11	10	9	8	7	5	7	5	4	4	5	4	5	5	5
Angthong	9	5	3	2	5	6	8	7	7	7	5	8	6	5	6	6	7	7	7	8	6	6
Pathumthani University	8	10	11	8	8	10	10	8	8	10	10	10	9	9	10	9	9	9	8	7	8	7
Saraburi United	11	8	4	3	2	3	3	4	4	4	6	5	7	6	7	7	6	6	6	6	7	8
Assumption United	4	4	2	5	4	4	4	6	6	6	7	6	8	8	8	8	8	8	9	9	9	9
Kanjanapat	1	2	5	7	7	7	7	9	9	8	9	9	10	10	9	10	10	10	10	10	10	10
Lopburi City	5	7	9	10	10	9	9	10	11	11	11	11	11	11	11	11	11	11	11	11	11	11
Thawi Watthana Samut Sakhon United	12	12	12	12	12	12	12	12	12	12	12	12	12	12	12	12	12	12	12	12	12	12

Source: Thai League
= Qualification to the National Championship stage; = Relegation to the Thailand Amateur League

=== Results by round ===
Team ╲ Round	1	2	3	4	5	6	7	8	9	10	11	12	13	14	15	16	17	18	19	20	21	22
Dragon Pathumwan Kanchanaburi	D	L	W	L	L	W	W	W	W	W	W	W	W	L	W	W	W	W	W	W	W	W
Samut Songkhram	W	W	W	W	W	W	D	W	D	L	W	L	D	W	W	W	W	W	W	W	D	W
Hua Hin City	L	W	L	W	W	W	D	W	W	L	W	W	L	D	L	W	W	W	L	W	W	L
Kanchanaburi City	W	D	L	W	W	L	D	W	W	L	D	W	D	W	W	L	L	W	D	W	W	W
Chainat United	D	L	D	L	L	W	D	L	W	W	W	W	W	D	W	W	D	L	W	L	W	L
Angthong	L	W	W	W	L	L	L	D	D	W	W	L	W	W	L	D	L	D	L	L	W	W
Pathumthani University	L	D	L	W	L	D	D	W	L	L	L	L	W	D	L	W	L	W	W	W	L	W
Saraburi United	L	W	W	W	W	L	D	D	W	L	L	W	L	W	L	L	W	D	D	L	L	L
Assumption United	W	D	W	L	W	D	D	L	L	W	D	W	D	L	L	L	D	L	L	L	L	L
Kanjanapat	W	D	D	L	W	L	D	L	L	W	L	L	L	L	W	L	D	L	D	L	D	W
Lopburi City	W	L	L	L	L	W	D	L	L	L	L	L	L	L	W	D	D	L	D	W	L	L
Thawi Watthana Samut Sakhon United	L	L	L	L	L	L	D	L	L	W	L	L	D	D	L	L	L	L	L	L	L	L

Source: Thai League
W = Won; D = Drawn; L = Lost

=== Results ===
Home \ Away	ATG	ASU	CNU	DPK	HHC	KCC	KJP	LBC	PTU	SKM	SRU	TWS
Angthong	—	2–1	6–1	1–6	2–0	1–2	4–1	1–1	0–1	1–1	0–0	4–0
Assumption United	2–0	—	2–2	1–3	2–1	1–2	3–2	2–0	1–1	2–4	1–2	2–1
Chainat United	2–0	1–1	—	3–3	0–0	2–0	1–1	4–3	0–1	0–1	2–3	1–0
Dragon Pathumwan Kanchanaburi	4–1	6–0	1–0	—	4–6	1–2	4–2	4–0	4–1	0–1	2–0	7–0
Hua Hin City	1–2	4–3	1–0	0–1	—	1–1	1–0	2–0	1–0	1–2	2–1	5–0
Kanchanaburi City	1–0	0–0	0–1	1–0	0–3	—	0–2	2–2	1–1	1–1	2–0	2–0
Kanjanapat	1–2	2–2	0–3	0–3	1–3	1–2	—	0–0	2–1	2–3	0–2	5–1
Lopburi City	1–0	2–0	3–4	3–4	0–2	1–2	0–0	—	2–3	0–1	2–3	2–0
Pathumthani University	1–2	4–3	1–0	0–4	4–2	0–1	0–2	0–1	—	0–1	0–1	0–0
Samut Songkhram	2–1	4–2	1–3	2–3	4–1	2–0	1–1	2–1	1–1	—	1–0	4–1
Saraburi United	0–0	5–2	0–1	1–2	0–3	1–4	1–1	1–0	1–3	1–2	—	4–1
Thawi Watthana Samut Sakhon United	1–5	0–0	0–5	1–3	1–7	0–2	0–4	2–1	2–8	0–1	2–2	—

Source: Thai League
Legend: Blue = home team win; Yellow = draw; Red = away team win.
For upcoming matches, an "a" indicates there is an article about the rivalry between the two participants.

== Season statistics ==
=== Top scorers ===
As of 19 March 2023.

Rank	Player	Club	Goals
1	(Thailand) Chitsanuphong Phimpsang	Hua Hin City	16
2	(Russia) Sergei Tumasyan	Dragon Pathumwan Kanchanaburi	14
3	(Thailand) Kitti Kinnonkok	Chainat United	13
3	(Thailand) Sirichai Lamphuttha	Dragon Pathumwan Kanchanaburi	13
5	(Myanmar) Than Paing	Kanchanaburi City	12
6	(Thailand) Intouch Yamyindee	Kanjanapat	11

=== Hat-tricks ===
Player	For	Against	Result	Date
(United States) Htoo Kapaw	Kanchanaburi City	Saraburi United	4–1 (A)	10 September 2022
(Thailand) Chitsanuphong Phimpsang	Hua Hin City	Thawi Watthana Samut Sakhon United	7–1 (A)	8 January 2023
(Thailand) Sirichai Lamphuttha	Dragon Pathumwan Kanchanaburi	Lopburi City	4–3 (A)	14 January 2023
(Thailand) Chitsanuphong Phimpsang	Hua Hin City	Kanjanapat	3–1 (A)	4 February 2023
(Thailand) Kitti Kinnonkok	Chainat United	Thawi Watthana Samut Sakhon United	5–0 (A)	26 February 2023

Notes: (H) = Home team; (A) = Away team

=== Clean sheets ===
As of 19 March 2023.

Rank	Player	Club	Clean sheets
1	(Thailand) Anusorn Chansod	Chainat United	6
1	(Thailand) Peradach Bunkame	Dragon Pathumwan Kanchanaburi	6
3	(Thailand) Anucha Suksri	Kanchanaburi City	5
3	(Thailand) Patcharaphon Kaewkham	Saraburi United (3), Pathumthani University (2)	5
5	(Thailand) Surakrai Haphonram	Hua Hin City	4
5	(Thailand) Prawit Phimparat	Lopburi City	4
5	(Thailand) Sornnarai Chamrurai	Samut Songkhram	4

== Attendances ==
=== Overall statistical table ===
Pos	Team	Total	High	Low	Average	Change
1	Kanchanaburi City	6,431	2,230	236	585	n/a
2	Dragon Pathumwan Kanchanaburi	3,941	850	160	359	n/a
3	Saraburi United	3,222	642	75	293	n/a
4	Hua Hin City	2,882	521	110	289	n/a
5	Angthong	2,821	425	69	257	n/a
6	Samut Songkhram	2,573	400	150	234	n/a
7	Assumption United	2,154	520	103	216	n/a
8	Lopburi City	1,605	399	1	179	n/a
9	Pathumthani University	1,295	300	30	118	n/a
10	Kanjanapat	1,279	250	38	117	n/a
11	Thawi Watthana Samut Sakhon United	1,047	150	50	96	n/a
12	Chainat United	646	100	40	72	n/a
	League total	29,896	2,230	1	238	n/a

Source: Thai League
