= 2021–22 Thai League 3 Western Region =

Thai League 3 Western Region
- Season: 2021–22
- Dates: 18 September 2021 – 27 February 2022
- Champions: Saraburi United
- Relegated: Bang Pa-in Ayutthaya
- T3 National Championship: Saraburi United; Pathumthani University
- Matches: 110
- Goals: 270 (2.45 per match)
- Top goalscorer: (Thailand) Sirichai Lamphuttha (10 goals; Angthong) (Brazil) Giuberty Silva Neves (10 goals; Pathumthani University)
- Best goalkeeper: (Thailand) Atthapon Rutham (8 clean sheets; Angthong)
- Biggest home win: 6 goals difference Angthong 6–0 Samut Songkhram (7 November 2021); Angthong 6–0 Kanchanaburi (5 February 2022)
- Biggest away win: 4 goals difference Chainat United 0–4 Kanchanaburi (18 September 2021); Assumption United 0–4 Kanchanaburi (23 October 2021); Hua Hin City 1–5 Saraburi United (12 February 2022)
- Highest scoring: 6 goals Angthong 6–0 Samut Songkhram (7 November 2021); Angthong 4–2 Assumption United (21 November 2021); Assumption United 4–2 Hua Hin City (16 January 2022); Angthong 6–0 Kanchanaburi (5 February 2022); Hua Hin City 1–5 Saraburi United (12 February 2022); Pathumthani University 5–1 Kanchanaburi (19 February 2022); Hua Hin City 5–1 Thawi Watthana Samut Sakhon United (27 February 2022)
- Longest winning run: 6 matches Thawi Watthana Samut Sakhon United
- Longest unbeaten run: 16 matches Pathumthani University
- Longest winless run: 15 matches Chainat United
- Longest losing run: 7 matches Samut Songkhram
- Highest attendance: 1,115; Saraburi United 1–1 Chainat United (10 October 2021)
- Total attendance: 11,566
- Average attendance: 178

The 2021–22 Thai League 3 Western region is a region in the regional stage of the 2021–22 Thai League 3. The tournament was sponsored by Blue Dragon Lottery Online, and known as the Blue Dragon League for sponsorship purposes. A total of 11 teams located in Western and Central of Thailand will compete in the league of the Western region.

== Teams ==
=== Number of teams by province ===
Position	Province	Number	Teams
1	Bangkok	2	Assumption United and Thawi Watthana Samut Sakhon United
1	Phra Nakhon Si Ayutthaya	2	Bang Pa-in Ayutthaya and Pathumthani University
2	Ang Thong	1	Angthong
2	Chai Nat	1	Chainat United
2	Kanchanaburi	1	Kanchanaburi
2	Pathum Thani	1	Kanjanapat
2	Prachuap Khiri Khan	1	Hua Hin City
2	Samut Songkhram	1	Samut Songkhram
2	Saraburi	1	Saraburi United

=== Stadiums and locations ===
Locations of the 2021–22 Thai League 3 Western region teams

Team	Location	Stadium	Coordinates
Angthong	Angthong (Mueang)	Angthong PAO. Stadium	14°37′45″N 100°27′07″E
Assumption United	Bangkok (Bang Khae)	Wongprachanukul Stadium	13°44′03″N 100°22′14″E
Bang Pa-in Ayutthaya	Ayutthaya (Ayutthaya)	Ayutthaya Provincial Stadium	14°21′00″N 100°35′50″E
Chainat United	Chainat (Nong Mamong)	Nong Mamong Stadium	15°16′26″N 99°52′05″E
Hua Hin City	Prachuap Khiri Khan (Hua Hin)	Hua Hin Municipal Stadium	12°31′37″N 99°58′10″E
Kanchanaburi	Kanchanaburi (Mueang)	Kanchanaburi Municipality Stadium	14°01′13″N 99°31′17″E
Kanjanapat	Pathum Thani (Thanyaburi)	Stadium of North Bangkok University	14°00′22″N 100°40′24″E
Pathumthani University	Ayutthaya (Bang Sai)	Ratchakram Stadium	14°10′09″N 100°31′45″E
Samut Songkhram	Samut Songkhram (Mueang)	Samut Songkhram PAO. Stadium	13°24′51″N 100°00′00″E
Samut Songkhram	Ratchaburi (Mueang)	Ratchaburi Provincial Stadium (temporary)	13°31′54″N 99°48′50″E
Saraburi United	Saraburi (Mueang)	Saraburi PAO. Stadium	14°33′24″N 100°54′17″E
Thawi Watthana Samut Sakhon United	Bangkok (Thawi Watthana)	Stadium of Bangkokthonburi University	13°46′09″N 100°20′44″E

Locations of teams in Bangkok Metropolitan region

=== Foreign players ===
A T3 team could register 3 foreign players from foreign players all around the world. A team can use 3 foreign players on the field in each game.

Note :
(substituted off) : players who released during second leg transfer window;
(substituted in) : players who registered during second leg transfer window.

AFC member countries players.
CAF member countries players.
CONCACAF member countries players.
CONMEBOL member countries players.
OFC member countries players.
UEFA member countries players.
No foreign player registered.

Club	Leg	Player 1	Player 2	Player 3
Angthong	1st	(Brazil) Raphael Pereira de Lima Câmara (substituted off)	(Brazil) Rennan Gonçalves Oliveira (substituted off)	(Egypt) Isalam Osama Ibrahim Abdelkarim
Angthong	2nd			(Egypt) Isalam Osama Ibrahim Abdelkarim
Assumption United	1st
Assumption United	2nd
Bang Pa-in Ayutthaya	1st	(Brazil) Breno Souza Dias
Bang Pa-in Ayutthaya	2nd	(Brazil) Breno Souza Dias
Chainat United	1st	(Brazil) Valci Júnior (substituted off)	(Mali) Boubacar Koné (substituted off)	(Ivory Coast) Henri Jöel
Chainat United	2nd		(Ivory Coast) Dennis Borketey Bortier (substituted in)	(Ivory Coast) Henri Jöel
Hua Hin City	1st	(Egypt) Amr Mostafa (substituted off)	(Egypt) Morsy Mohamed	(Ghana) Daniel Measah
Hua Hin City	2nd	(Egypt) Ehab Esam Zakaria Elgeziry (substituted in)	(Egypt) Morsy Mohamed	(Ghana) Daniel Measah
Kanchanaburi	1st	(Brazil) Lucas Massaro Garcia Gama (substituted off)	(Ivory Coast) Diarra Junior Aboubacar (substituted off)	(Japan) Kento Nagasaki (substituted off)
Kanchanaburi	2nd		(Nigeria) Omotosho Shola Jimmy (substituted in)	(Ghana) Adam Ismail (substituted in)
Kanjanapat	1st	(Brazil) Addison Alves (substituted off)	(Ghana) Ozor Enoch (substituted off)	(South Africa) Rhoda Matthew Kenneth
Kanjanapat	2nd	(Argentina) Juan Francisco Odorisio (substituted in)	(Argentina) Alexis Vaiani (substituted in)	(South Africa) Rhoda Matthew Kenneth
Pathumthani University	1st	(Ivory Coast) Dennis Borketey Bortier (substituted off)	(Japan) Yusaku Yamadera (substituted off)	(Brazil) Giuberty Silva Neves
Pathumthani University	2nd	(Brazil) Josimar Tiago da Silva (substituted in)	(Iran) Milad Sasani Nezhad (substituted in)	(Brazil) Giuberty Silva Neves
Samut Songkhram	1st	(United States) Adoo Daniel Ikuukunee (substituted off)	(Ghana) Amagwe Clement Nana
Samut Songkhram	2nd	(Guinea) Sylla Sekou Nana (substituted in)	(Ghana) Amagwe Clement Nana
Saraburi United	1st	(Cameroon) Moussa Abakar (substituted off)	(Iran) Chajouei Mahdi Mohammad (substituted off)	(Japan) Ryo Tomigahara
Saraburi United	2nd	(Brazil) Douglas Tardin (substituted in)	(Mali) Boubacar Koné (substituted in)	(Japan) Ryo Tomigahara
Thawi Watthana Samut Sakhon United	1st	(Argentina) Juan Manuel Aloy (substituted off)	(Argentina) Lucas Daniel Echenique	(Argentina) Ramiro Lizaso
Thawi Watthana Samut Sakhon United	2nd	(Colombia) John Steven Cabrera Ortiz (substituted in)	(Argentina) Lucas Daniel Echenique	(Argentina) Ramiro Lizaso

== League table ==
=== Standings ===
Pos	Team	Pld	W	D	L	GF	GA	GD	Pts	Qualification or relegation
1	Saraburi United (C, Q)	20	14	3	3	36	17	+19	45	Qualification to the National Championship stage
2	Pathumthani University (Q)	20	10	9	1	30	13	+17	39	Qualification to the National Championship stage
3	Hua Hin City	20	10	3	7	31	19	+12	33	
4	Kanchanaburi	20	9	4	7	28	29	−1	31	
5	Assumption United	20	8	4	8	28	25	+3	28	
6	Angthong	20	7	6	7	29	22	+7	27	
7	Thawi Watthana Samut Sakhon United	20	8	1	11	22	32	−10	25	
8	Kanjanapat	20	6	3	11	15	22	−7	21	
9	Chainat United	20	3	10	7	17	28	−11	19 (Note: The head-to-head record was a tie, Chainat United ahead on overall goals difference.)	
10	Samut Songkhram	20	5	4	11	17	32	−15	19	
11	Bang Pa-in Ayutthaya (R)	20	5	3	12	17	31	−14	18	Relegation to the Thailand Amateur League

Source: Thai League
Rules for classification: 1) Points; 2) Head-to-head points; 3) Head-to-head goal difference; 4) Head-to-head goal scored; 5) Overall goal difference; 6) Overall goal scored; 7) Fair play points; 8) Play-off without extra time).
(C) Champions; (Q) Qualified for the phase indicated; (R) Relegated

=== Positions by round ===
Team ╲ Round	1	2	3	4	5	6	7	8	9	10	11	12	13	14	15	16	17	18	19	20	21	22
Saraburi United	2	2	2	1	1	2	2	3	3	4	4	3	4	4	4	2	2	1	1	1	1	1
Pathumthani University	6	5	3	5	5	5	4	4	4	3	3	4	3	1	1	1	1	3	3	2	2	2
Hua Hin City	3	4	4	3	3	3	3	2	2	2	1	1	2	2	3	4	4	2	2	4	4	3
Kanchanaburi	1	1	1	2	2	1	1	1	1	1	2	2	1	3	2	3	3	4	4	3	3	4
Assumption United	9	8	10	7	7	8	7	8	6	6	5	5	6	5	5	5	5	5	5	5	5	5
Angthong	4	9	11	10	10	9	9	9	9	7	7	9	7	7	7	7	6	6	6	7	7	6
Thawi Watthana Samut Sakhon United	10	11	8	9	9	10	10	10	10	10	11	10	11	10	8	8	8	7	7	6	6	7
Kanjanapat	5	3	6	8	8	6	6	6	8	9	8	7	8	8	9	9	11	8	8	8	8	8
Chainat United	11	10	7	6	6	7	8	7	7	8	9	8	9	11	11	10	10	11	11	11	11	9
Samut Songkhram	7	7	9	11	11	11	11	11	11	11	10	11	10	9	10	11	9	10	10	10	9	10
Bang Pa-in Ayutthaya	8	6	5	4	4	4	5	5	5	5	6	6	5	6	6	6	7	9	9	9	10	11

Source: Thai League
= Qualification to the National Championship stage; = Relegation to Thailand Amateur League

=== Results by round ===
Team ╲ Round	1	2	3	4	5	6	7	8	9	10	11	12	13	14	15	16	17	18	19	20	21	22
Saraburi United	W	W	N	D	W	W	L	W	W	L	D	W	N	W	L	W	D	W	W	W	W	W
Pathumthani University	D	D	W	D	D	W	W	W	N	W	D	D	W	W	D	D	D	L	N	W	W	W
Hua Hin City	W	N	D	W	W	L	W	W	W	W	W	N	L	D	L	D	L	W	L	L	L	W
Kanchanaburi	W	W	D	N	W	W	W	L	W	W	D	L	W	N	D	D	L	L	L	W	L	L
Assumption United	L	D	L	W	L	L	W	N	W	L	W	D	L	W	W	D	L	N	W	D	W	L
Angthong	D	L	L	D	L	D	L	W	L	W	N	L	W	L	W	D	W	D	W	D	N	W
Thawi Watthana Samut Sakhon United	L	L	W	L	L	L	N	L	D	L	L	W	L	W	W	W	N	W	W	W	L	L
Kanjanapat	D	W	L	L	N	W	L	D	L	L	D	W	L	L	N	L	W	W	W	L	L	L
Chainat United	L	D	W	D	D	D	L	D	D	N	L	D	L	L	D	D	D	L	L	N	W	W
Samut Songkhram	D	L	L	L	L	N	L	L	L	W	W	L	W	D	D	N	W	D	L	L	W	L
Bang Pa-in Ayutthaya	N	D	W	W	W	L	W	L	L	L	L	D	W	L	L	L	D	L	L	L	L	N

Source: Thai League
N = No match; W = Won; D = Drawn; L = Lost

=== Results ===
Home \ Away	ATG	ASU	BPA	CNU	HHC	KCB	KJP	PTU	SKM	SRU	TWS
Angthong	—	4–2	2–1	0–0	1–0	6–0	1–0	1–1	6–0	0–3	2–0
Assumption United	0–0	—	2–0	2–2	4–2	0–4	2–0	0–3	0–1	0–1	4–0
Bang Pa-in Ayutthaya	3–2	0–2	—	1–1	0–3	2–3	2–0	1–1	0–2	1–2	1–0
Chainat United	1–1	0–0	0–1	—	1–0	0–4	0–2	0–0	2–1	0–3	0–0
Hua Hin City	1–0	2–1	2–0	3–0	—	0–0	3–0	1–1	1–1	1–5	5–1
Kanchanaburi	4–1	0–0	2–0	1–3	1–0	—	1–0	1–1	3–1	0–2	2–1
Kanjanapat	0–0	1–3	0–1	2–2	1–0	2–1	—	0–1	1–0	0–0	3–0
Pathumthani University	2–0	2–1	1–1	1–1	1–0	5–1	1–0	—	0–0	3–1	0–1
Samut Songkhram	0–0	0–3	1–0	3–2	0–2	0–0	1–2	2–3	—	1–2	0–1
Saraburi United	1–0	3–1	2–1	1–1	1–3	1–0	2–1	0–0	3–1	—	0–2
Thawi Watthana Samut Sakhon United	3–2	0–1	3–1	2–1	0–2	4–0	1–0	1–3	1–2	1–3	—

Source: Thai League
Legend: Blue = home team win; Yellow = draw; Red = away team win.
For upcoming matches, an "a" indicates there is an article about the rivalry between the two participants.
Notes:
- 30 January 2022, Bang Pa-in Ayutthaya didn't come to the game and was forfeited and awarded 2 goals to Hua Hin City.
- 5 February 2022, Bang Pa-in Ayutthaya didn't come to the game and was forfeited and awarded 2 goals to Assumption United.
- 12 February 2022, Bang Pa-in Ayutthaya didn't come to the game and was forfeited and awarded 2 goals to Kanchanaburi.
- 20 February 2022, Bang Pa-in Ayutthaya didn't come to the game and was forfeited and awarded 2 goals to Samut Songkhram.

== Season statistics ==
=== Top scorers ===
As of 27 February 2022.

Rank	Player	Club	Goals
1	(Thailand) Sirichai Lamphuttha	Angthong	10
1	(Brazil) Giuberty Silva Neves	Pathumthani University	10
3	(Thailand) Anon Kaimook	Hua Hin City	8
4	(Thailand) Panudech Suabpeng	Hua Hin City (3), Thawi Watthana Samut Sakhon United (4)	7
4	(Brazil) Lucas Massaro Garcia Gama	Kanchanaburi	7
4	(Brazil) Douglas Tardin	Saraburi United	7

=== Hat-tricks ===
Player	For	Against	Result	Date
(Brazil) Addison Alves	Kanjanapat	Thawi Watthana Samut Sakhon United	3–0 (H)	24 October 2021
(Brazil) Giuberty Silva Neves	Pathumthani University	Assumption United	3–0 (A)	25 December 2021
(Thailand) Bundit Paponpai	Pathumthani University	Kanchanaburi	5–1 (H)	19 February 2022

Notes: (H) = Home team; (A) = Away team

=== Clean sheets ===
As of 27 February 2022.

Rank	Player	Club	Clean sheets
1	(Thailand) Atthapon Rutham	Angthong	8
2	(Thailand) Natthasan Pakkarano	Assumption United	6
2	(Thailand) Natchaphon Dechwan	Hua Hin City	6
2	(Thailand) Buncha Yimchoi	Pathumthani University	6
2	(Argentina) Lucas Daniel Echenique	Thawi Watthana Samut Sakhon United	6

== Attendances ==
=== Overall statistical table ===
Pos	Team	Total	High	Low	Average	Change
1	Saraburi United	4,643	1,115	0	580	n/a
2	Angthong	1,629	298	0	204	n/a
3	Hua Hin City	1,310	250	0	187	n/a
4	Kanchanaburi	991	181	0	124	n/a
5	Samut Songkhram	983	320	0	123	n/a
6	Bang Pa-in Ayutthaya	970	0	0	121	n/a
7	Pathumthani University	425	125	0	85	n/a
8	Assumption United	80	80	0	80	n/a
9	Kanjanapat	395	120	0	66	n/a
10	Chainat United	140	35	0	23	n/a
11	Thawi Watthana Samut Sakhon United	0	0	0	0	n/a
	League total	11,566	1,115	0	178	n/a

Updated to games played on 27 February 2022
Source: Thai League 3

=== Attendances by home match played ===
Team \ Match played	1	2	3	4	5	6	7	8	9	10	Total
Angthong	0	0	159	156	129	198	314	260	298	115	1,629
Assumption United	0	0	0	0	0	0	0	0	0	80	80
Bang Pa-in Ayutthaya	150	150	200	110	120	100	120	20	0	0	970
Chainat United	0	0	0	35	30	10	0	30	20	15	140
Hua Hin City	0	0	250	150	230	100	250	0	250	80	1,310
Kanchanaburi	0	158	181	152	161	92	92	100	0	55	991
Kanjanapat	0	0	0	50	70	25	60	0	70	120	395
Pathumthani University	0	0	0	0	60	80	50	0	125	110	425
Samut Songkhram	0	0	320	110	80	28	157	98	110	80	983
Saraburi United	0	1,115	0	423	343	342	368	519	632	901	4,643
Thawi Watthana Samut Sakhon United	0	0	0	0	0	0	0	0	0	0	0

Source: Thai League

== See also ==
- 2021–22 Thai League 1
- 2021–22 Thai League 2
- 2021–22 Thai League 3
- 2021–22 Thai League 3 Northern Region
- 2021–22 Thai League 3 Northeastern Region
- 2021–22 Thai League 3 Eastern Region
- 2021–22 Thai League 3 Southern Region
- 2021–22 Thai League 3 Bangkok Metropolitan Region
- 2021–22 Thai League 3 National Championship
- 2021–22 Thai FA Cup
- 2021–22 Thai League Cup
- 2021 Thailand Champions Cup
