= 2019 Thai League 4 Eastern Region =

Thai League 4 Eastern Region
- Season: 2019
- Dates: 9 February 2019 – 1 September 2019
- Champions: Bankhai United
- Relegated: Phanthong
- T4 Champions League: Bankhai United; Kohkwang
- Matches played: 112
- Goals scored: 309 (2.76 per match)
- Top goalscorer: (Thailand) Chatchai Narkwijit (19 goals; Kohkwang)
- Biggest home win: 8 goals difference Bankhai United 8–0 Royal Thai Fleet (31 July 2019)
- Biggest away win: 4 goals difference Phanthong 0–4 Pluakdaeng United (2 June 2019); Royal Thai Fleet 2–6 Kohkwang (15 July 2019); Phanthong 0–4 Kohkwang (31 July 2019)
- Highest scoring: 8 goals Bankhai United 5–3 Royal Thai Fleet (7 April 2019); Pattaya Discovery United 6–2 Chanthaburi (8 June 2019); Royal Thai Fleet 2–6 Kohkwang (15 July 2019); Bankhai United 8–0 Royal Thai Fleet (31 July 2019)
- Longest winning run: 8 matches Bankhai United
- Longest unbeaten run: 12 matches Bankhai United
- Longest winless run: 16 matches Phanthong
- Longest losing run: 4 matches Chanthaburi; Royal Thai Fleet; Phanthong
- Highest attendance: 950; Kohkwang 3–0 Pluakdaeng United (10 February 2019)
- Lowest attendance: 20; Phanthong 1–0 Royal Thai Fleet (16 March 2019)
- Total attendance: 30,792
- Average attendance: 277

The 2019 Thai League 4 Eastern region is a region in the regional stage of the 2019 Thai League 4. A total of 8 teams located in Eastern of Thailand will compete in the league of the Eastern region.

== Teams ==
=== Number of teams by province ===
Position	Province	Number	Teams
1	Chonburi	3	Pattaya Discovery United, Phanthong, and Royal Thai Fleet
2	Chanthaburi	2	Chanthaburi and Kohkwang
2	Rayong	2	Bankhai United and Pluakdaeng United
4	Prachinburi	1	Saimit Kabin United

=== Stadiums and locations ===
Locations of the 2019 Thai League 4 Eastern region teams

Team	Location	Stadium	Coordinates
Bankhai United	Rayong (Ban Khai)	Wai Krong Stadium	12°48′26″N 101°17′51″E
Chanthaburi	Chanthaburi (Mueang)	Chanthaburi Provincial Stadium	12°36′36″N 102°06′20″E
Kohkwang	Chanthaburi (Mueang)	Rambhai Barni Rajabhat University Stadium	12°39′50″N 102°06′06″E
Pattaya Discovery United	Chonburi (Pattaya)	Nong Prue Stadium	12°55′27″N 100°56′14″E
Phanthong	Chonburi (Mueang)	IPE Chonburi Stadium	13°24′40″N 100°59′37″E
Pluakdaeng United	Rayong (Pluak Daeng)	CK Stadium	12°59′04″N 101°12′55″E
Royal Thai Fleet	Chonburi (Sattahip)	Sattahip Navy Stadium	12°39′49″N 100°56′09″E
Saimit Kabin United	Prachinburi (Kabin Buri)	Nomklao Maharat Stadium	13°59′20″N 101°43′25″E

== League table ==
=== Standings ===
Pos	Team	Pld	W	D	L	GF	GA	GD	Pts	Qualification or relegation
1	Bankhai United (Q)	28	19	6	3	60	19	+41	63	Qualification to the Champions League stage
2	Kohkwang (Q)	28	18	5	5	51	24	+27	59	Qualification to the Champions League stage
3	Pattaya Discovery United	28	15	6	7	52	31	+21	51	
4	Saimit Kabin United	28	10	10	8	32	30	+2	40	
5	Pluakdaeng United	28	8	8	12	35	39	−4	32	
6	Chanthaburi	28	7	7	14	30	44	−14	28	
7	Royal Thai Fleet	28	6	6	16	32	56	−24	24	
8	Phanthong (R)	28	2	6	20	17	66	−49	12	Relegation to the 2020 Thailand Amateur League

Source: Thai League
Rules for classification: 1) Points; 2) Head-to-head points; 3) Head-to-head goal difference; 4) Head-to-head goal scored; 5) Overall goal difference; 6) Overall goal scored; 7) Fair play points; 8) Play-off without extra time).
(Q) Qualified for the phase indicated; (R) Relegated

=== Positions by round ===
Qualification to the Champions League stage
Relegation to the 2020 Thailand Amateur League

Team ╲ Round	1	2	3	4	5	6	7	8	9	10	11	12	13	14	15	16	17	18	19	20	21	22	23	24	25	26	27	28
Bankhai United	3	4	5	4	3	5	3	3	2	2	2	1	1	1	1	1	1	1	1	1	1	1	1	1	1	1	1	1
Kohkwang	2	2	1	1	1	1	1	1	1	1	1	2	2	2	2	2	2	2	2	2	2	2	2	2	2	2	2	2
Pattaya Discovery United	1	1	3	3	5	3	4	4	4	4	4	4	4	3	3	3	3	3	3	3	3	3	3	3	3	3	3	3
Saimit Kabin United	5	3	2	2	2	4	2	2	3	3	3	3	3	4	4	4	4	4	4	4	4	4	4	4	4	4	4	4
Pluakdaeng United	7	5	4	5	4	2	5	5	5	6	6	5	5	5	5	5	5	5	5	5	5	5	5	5	5	5	5	5
Chanthaburi	6	7	6	6	6	6	6	6	6	5	5	6	7	7	7	7	7	6	7	7	7	7	7	7	7	6	6	6
Royal Thai Fleet	4	6	7	7	8	7	7	7	7	7	7	7	6	6	6	6	6	7	6	6	6	6	6	6	6	7	7	7
Phanthong	8	8	8	8	7	8	8	8	8	8	8	8	8	8	8	8	8	8	8	8	8	8	8	8	8	8	8	8

Source: Thai League

=== Results ===
For the Eastern region, a total 28 matches per team competing in 4 legs.

Home \ Away	BKU	CTB	KKG	PDU	PTG	PLU	RTF	SKU	BKU	CTB	KKG	PDU	PTG	PLU	RTF	SKU
Bankhai United	—	1–0	2–1	1–0	4–0	4–0	5–3	1–0	—	1–1	1–1	0–0	5–0	2–1	8–0	3–1
Chanthaburi	1–4	—	0–2	2–2	3–0	0–1	1–2	0–0	2–2	—	0–2	1–2	2–1	1–0	1–0	3–1
Kohkwang	1–1	0–3	—	3–0	1–0	3–0	2–1	1–0	0–1	1–0	—	2–1	4–0	1–1	3–0	1–0
Pattaya Discovery United	1–0	6–2	0–0	—	6–0	1–1	1–2	1–1	0–1	2–1	3–1	—	2–0	4–0	5–1	1–1
Phanthong	1–3	1–2	1–2	1–2	—	0–4	1–0	0–2	0–3	0–0	0–4	1–0	—	2–2	1–3	1–2
Pluakdaeng United	2–1	1–1	1–2	1–2	1–0	—	2–0	3–1	1–2	1–1	2–3	2–3	4–1	—	0–1	2–0
Royal Thai Fleet	0–2	5–1	0–1	0–2	1–1	1–1	—	0–2	1–2	3–0	2–6	1–2	2–2	0–0	—	1–1
Saimit Kabin United	0–0	2–1	2–2	4–1	2–2	2–1	1–1	—	1–0	1–0	2–1	1–2	0–0	0–0	2–1	—

Source: Thai League
Legend: Blue = home team win; Yellow = draw; Red = away team win.
For upcoming matches, an "a" indicates there is an article about the rivalry between the two participants.

== Season statistics ==
=== Top scorers by team ===
Position	Teams	Name	Goals
1	Kohkwang	(Thailand) Chatchai Narkwijit	19
2	Pattaya Discovery United	(Thailand) Narathip Kruearanya	17
3	Bankhai United	(Thailand) Tatree Seeha	14
4	Chanthaburi	(Thailand) Tripop Janoensheep	9
4	Saimit Kabin United	(Thailand) Mathee Pungpo	9
6	Pluakdaeng United	(Thailand) Alongkorn Nuekmai	8
7	Royal Thai Fleet	(Thailand) Pisansin Za-in	7
7	Royal Thai Fleet	(Thailand) Sathaphon Panmisi	7
9	Phanthong	(Thailand) Archawit Khomhongsa	3

== Attendances ==
=== Overall statistical table ===
Pos	Team	Total	High	Low	Average	Change
1	Kohkwang	6,528	950	180	466	n/a
2	Chanthaburi	4,625	755	278	356	+1.1%
3	Pattaya Discovery United	4,701	700	100	336	+63.9%
4	Saimit Kabin United	3,890	420	100	278	+22.5%
5	Royal Thai Fleet	3,475	450	105	248	−24.4%
6	Pluakdaeng United	3,136	423	150	224	−7.4%
7	Bankhai United	2,883	370	43	206	−8.8%
8	Phanthong	1,554	240	20	111	n/a
	League total	30,792	950	20	277	+19.4%

Source: Thai League

=== Attendances by home match played ===
Team \ Match played	1	2	3	4	5	6	7	8	9	10	11	12	13	14	Total
Bankhai United	200	43	250	250	150	200	300	250	270	100	200	370	100	200	2,883
Chanthaburi	Unk.1	456	278	292	282	312	325	755	326	356	375	285	298	285	4,625
Kohkwang	950	800	713	498	410	291	180	433	420	494	419	303	306	311	6,528
Pattaya Discovery United	470	700	521	400	700	300	250	160	100	300	250	200	150	200	4,701
Phanthong	200	100	20	23	240	100	150	32	120	67	50	172	230	50	1,554
Pluakdaeng United	423	300	188	150	150	200	250	420	210	250	170	185	180	160	3,136
Royal Thai Fleet	450	360	152	200	216	220	190	147	415	320	225	125	105	350	3,475
Saimit Kabin United	100	420	200	400	150	300	250	120	275	350	400	105	420	400	3,890

Source: Thai League Note:
Unk.1 Some error of T4 official match report 16 February 2019 (Chanthaburi 0–2 Kohkwang).

== See also ==
- 2019 Thai League 1
- 2019 Thai League 2
- 2019 Thai League 3
- 2019 Thai League 4
- 2019 Thailand Amateur League
- 2019 Thai FA Cup
- 2019 Thai League Cup
- 2019 Thailand Champions Cup
