= Atthaphol Permsiri =

Thai footballer (born 1984)

Personal information
- Full name: Atthaphol Permsiri
- Date of birth: January 27, 1984 (age 42)
- Place of birth: Bangkok, Thailand
- Height: 1.67 m (5 ft 5 1/2 in)
- Position: Defender

Team information
- Current team: Samut Songkhram
- Number: 5

Senior career*
Years	Team	Apps	(Gls)
2008–2009	PTT	45	(1)
2010–	Samut Songkhram	4	(0)
- * Club domestic league appearances and goals as of 22 April 2010

Atthaphol Permsiri (born January 1984) is a Thai footballer. He plays for Thailand Premier League clubside Samut Songkhram FC.

== See also ==
- Football in Thailand
