= Songwut Buapetch =

Thai footballer (born 1980)

Personal information
- Full name: Songwut Buapetch
- Date of birth: 12 June 1980 (age 46)
- Place of birth: Trang, Thailand
- Height: 1.74 m (5 ft 8 1/2 in)
- Position: Defender

Senior career*
Years	Team	Apps	(Gls)
2007–2009	Samut Songkhram	83	(18)
2010	TTM Phichit	11	(2)
2010	Samut Songkhram	5	(1)
2011	Chanthaburi	16	(2)
2011	Trang	7	(0)
2012	TOT	4	(0)
2013–2014	Samut Songkhram	19	(0)
2014	Looktabfah	6	(0)
2015–2016	Samut Sakhon	21	(0)

Managerial career
- 2018: Samut Sakhon
- 2019: Samut Sakhon
- * Club domestic league appearances and goals as of 22 June 2008

Songwut Buapetch (Thai: ทรงวุฒิ บัวเพ็ชร, born June 12, 1980), simply known as Wut (Thai: วุฒิ), is a Thai retired professional footballer who played as a defender for Thai League 3 club Samut Sakhon.
