= Kapaw Htoo =

Karen footballer (born 1996)

Personal information
- Date of birth: 19 September 1996
- Place of birth: Thailand
- Height: 1.72 m (5 ft 8 in)
- Position: Midfielder

Senior career*
Years	Team	Apps	(Gls)
–2015	Minnesota Twin Stars		
2016–2018	Yangon United		
2021–2022	Chanthaburi		
2022	Kanchanaburi City		

International career
- Karen
- * Club domestic league appearances and goals

Kapaw Htoo (born 19 September 1996) is a Karen footballer who plays as a midfielder.

== Early life and education ==
Htoo moved from Thailand to the United States at the age of seven. Htoo attended Dakota County Technical College in the United States.

== Club career ==
Htoo played for Burmese side Yangon United, where he played in the AFC Cup. After that, he played for Thai side Chanthaburi, where he scored two goals in his first five appearances. After that, he played for Thai side Kanchanaburi City, where he received media attention for hitting an opposing player during a league game.

== International career ==
Htoo played for the Karen national football team.

== Style of play ==
Htoo initially operated as a striker before switching to winger later in his career.

== Personal life ==
Htoo was born in Thailand to ethnic Karen parents from Myanmar.
