= Pisansin Za-in =

Thai footballer

Personal information
- Full name: Pisansin Za-in
- Date of birth: 3 November 1983 (age 43)
- Place of birth: Thailand
- Height: 1.85 m (6 ft 1 in)
- Position: Forward

Team information
- Current team: Navy
- Number: 9

Senior career*
Years	Team	Apps	(Gls)
2013–2014	Samutsongkhram	10	(1)
2015–2018	Navy	36	(4)
2019-	Royal Thai Fleet FC	17	(7)
- * Club domestic league appearances and goals as of 00:54, 22 September 2017 (UTC)

Pisansin Za-in (born 3 November 1983) is a Thai professional footballer. He previously played for Navy, and earlier for Samut Songkhram. On 17 October 2015, Za-in scored a hat trick in a shocking 4–2 win over Suphanburi. After the Navy was relegated to the Second Division at the end of 2018, he moved to Royal Thai Fleet FC. The club is also based in Sattahip and played in the third division, the Thai-League 3 East.
