= Thawi Watthana Samut Sakhon United F.C. =

Thai football club

Thawi Watthana Samut Sakhon United ทวีวัฒนา สมุทรสาคร ยูไนเต็ด
- Full name: Thawi Watthana Samut Sakhon United Football Club สโมสรฟุตบอล ทวีวัฒนา สมุทรสาคร ยูไนเต็ด
- Founded: 2008; 18 years ago (as IPE Samut Sakhon); 2016; 10 years ago (as IPE Samut Sakhon United); 2020; 6 years ago (as Thawi Watthana Samut Sakhon United)
- Ground: IPE Samut Sakhon Stadium; Samut Sakhon, Thailand
- Capacity: 6,000
- Owner: IPE Samut Sakhon United Co.Ltd.
- Chairman: Kitti Thongtab
- League: Thailand Semi-pro League
Home colours	Away colours

Thawi Watthana Samut Sakhon United Football Club (Thai: ทวีวัฒนา สมุทรสาคร ยูไนเต็ด) is a Thai association football club based in Samut Sakhon Province. The club plays their home matches at IPE Samut Sakhon Stadium. It is currently playing in the Thai League 3 Western region.

Prior to 2016, the club was called IPE Samut Sakhon FC. After it was promoted to the Regional League Division 2, the club changed its name to IPE Samut Sakhon United.

== History ==
In 2022, Thawi Watthana Samut Sakhon United competed in the Thai League 3. The club started the season with a 0–4 home defeat to Kanjanapat, and ended the season with a 1–5 away defeat to the same opponent. The club has finished 12th and got relegated. In addition, in the 2022–23 Thai League Cup Thawi Watthana Samut Sakhon United was defeated 0–6 by Dragon Pathumwan Kanchanaburi in the second qualification round.

== Crest history ==
2016–2019

2020–present

== Stadium and location ==
Coordinates	Location	Stadium	Year
13°24′51″N 99°59′59″E	Samut Songkhram	Samut Songkhram Stadium	2016
13°32′30″N 100°16′50″E	Samut Sakhon	IPE Samut Sakhon Stadium	2017–

== Season by season record ==
Season	League									FA Cup	League Cup	Top goalscorer	
Season	Division	P	W	D	L	F	A	Pts	Pos	FA Cup	League Cup	Name	Goals
2016	DIV 2 West	22	4	4	14	21	40	16	11th	Not enter	QR1	(Iran) Abdollah Kolahkaj	5
2017	T4 West	27	11	5	11	39	40	38	6th	Did not enter	QR1	(Thailand) Nutchawit Khunnak	8
2018	T4 West	24	12	6	6	31	18	42	2nd	Not enter	QRP	(Guinea) Almamy Sylla	11
2019	T4 West	24	7	5	12	25	45	26	7th	Not enter	Not enter	(Thailand) Kittin Duangket	5
2020–21	T3 West	17	3	2	12	15	38	11	12th	Did not enter	Did not enter	(Thailand) Thawatchai Wisetdee	8
2021–22	T3 West	20	8	1	11	22	32	25	7th	R1	QR1	(Thailand) Noppaklao Damrongthai	5
2022–23	T3 West	22	1	3	18	13	74	6	12th	Did not enter	QR2	(Thailand) Piyawat Nakphon	4

Champion	Runner	Promoted	Relegated

== Honours ==
- Khǒr Royal Cup
  - Winners (1): 2015

== Team records ==
- Biggest win
  - 5–1 v Navy Medical Department (Khor Royal Cup, 21 November 2014)
- Biggest defeat
  - 10–0 v Muangkan United F.C. (Thai League 3, 25 October 2020)
