= Khao Plong Stadium =

Football stadium in Chai Nat Province, Thailand

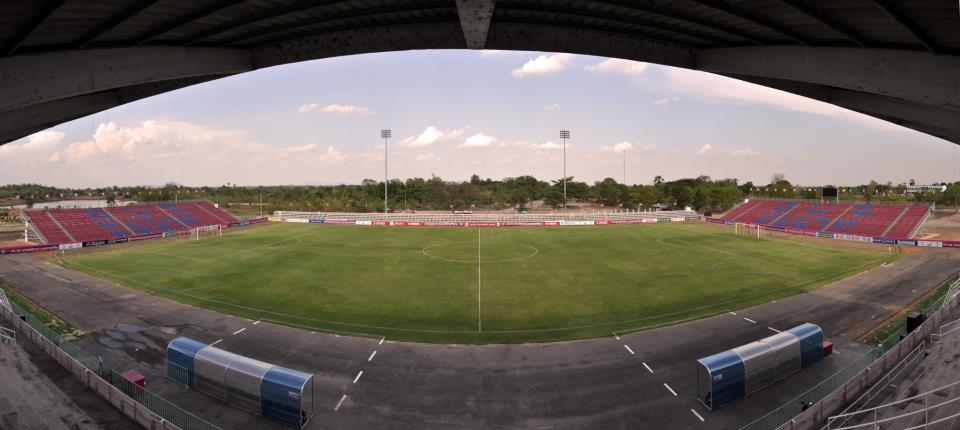
- Interactive map of Khao Plong Stadium
- Location: Khao Tha Phra, Mueang Chai Nat, Chai Nat, Thailand
- Coordinates: 15°13′08″N 100°09′20″E
- Owner: Chai Nat Provincial Administration Organisation
- Operator: Chainat Hornbill F.C.
- Capacity: 12,000
- Surface: Grass

Construction
- Opened: N/A

Tenants
- Chainat Hornbill; Chainat United

Khao Plong Stadium (Thai: เขาพลอง สเตเดี้ยม) or Chai Nat Provincial Stadium (Thai: สนามกีฬากลางจังหวัดชัยนาท) is a stadium in Chai Nat Province, Thailand, It is currently used for football matches and is the home stadium of Chainat Hornbill of the Thai League 2. The stadium had the capacity to hold 5,574 spectators in 2011, but with expansion the stadium now can hold up to 12,000 spectators.

== Photos ==
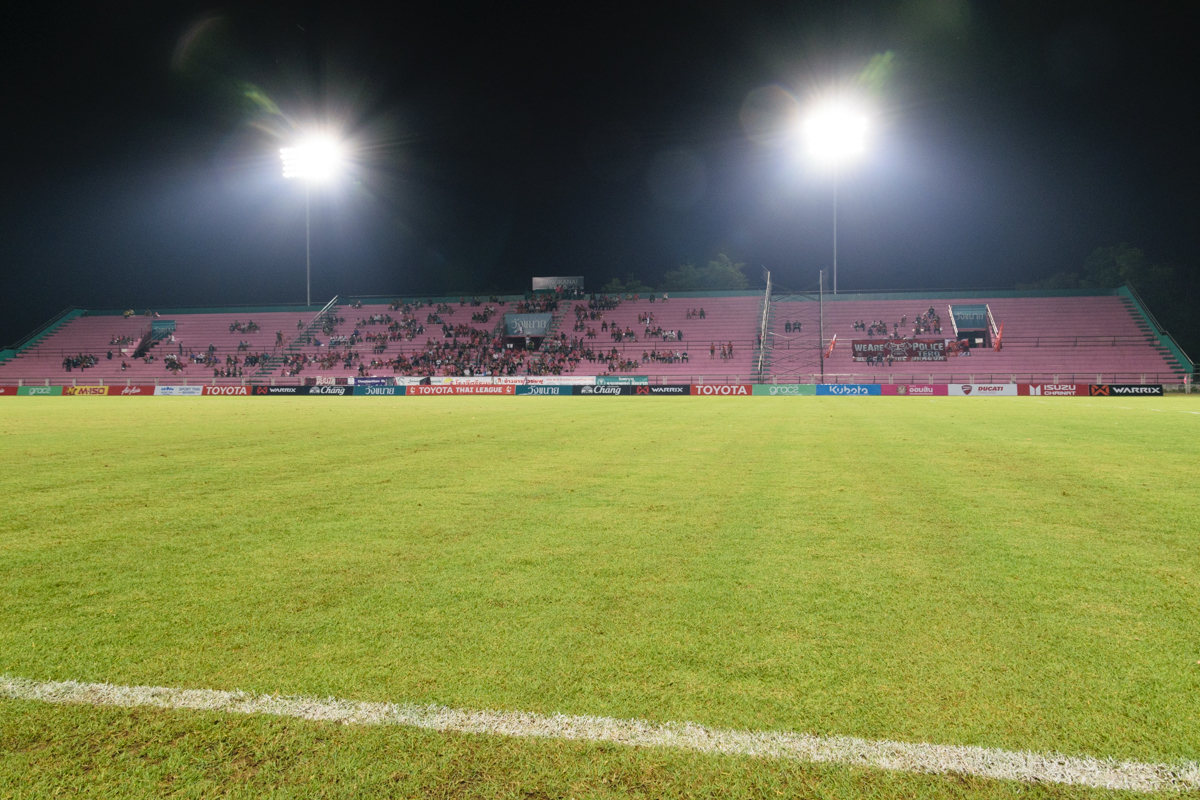

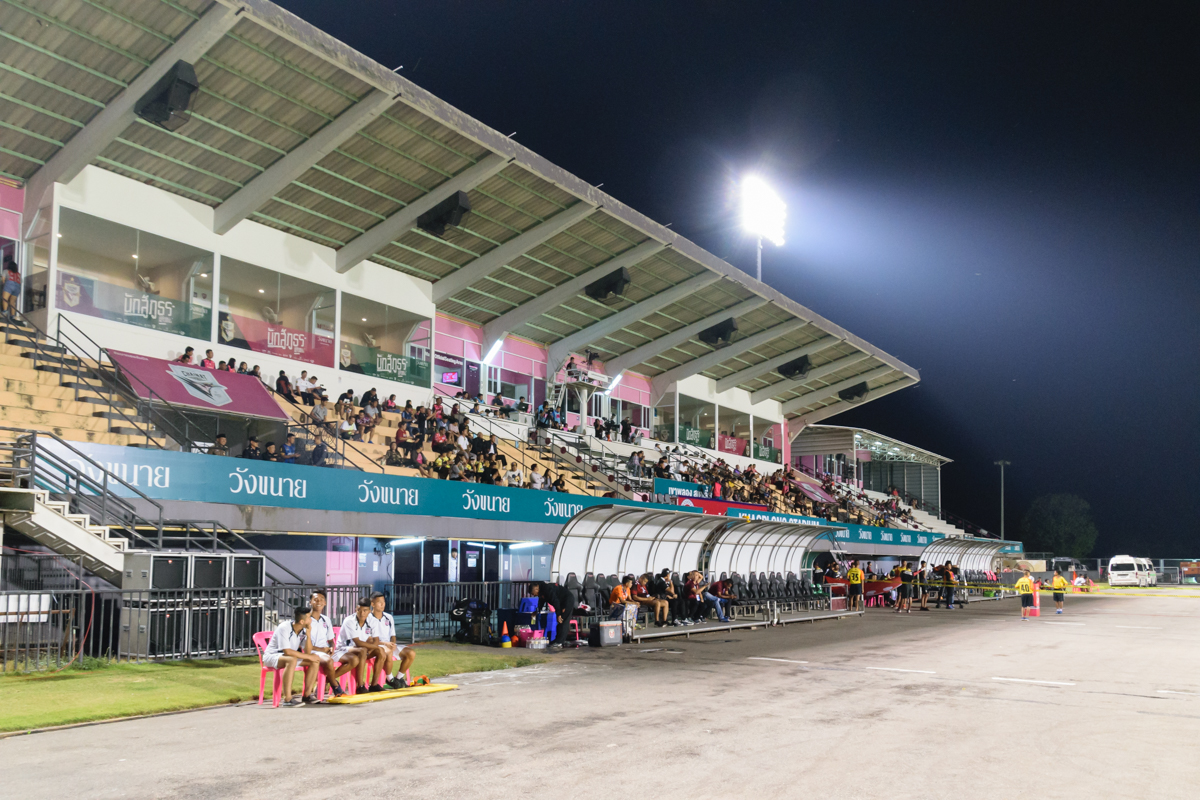

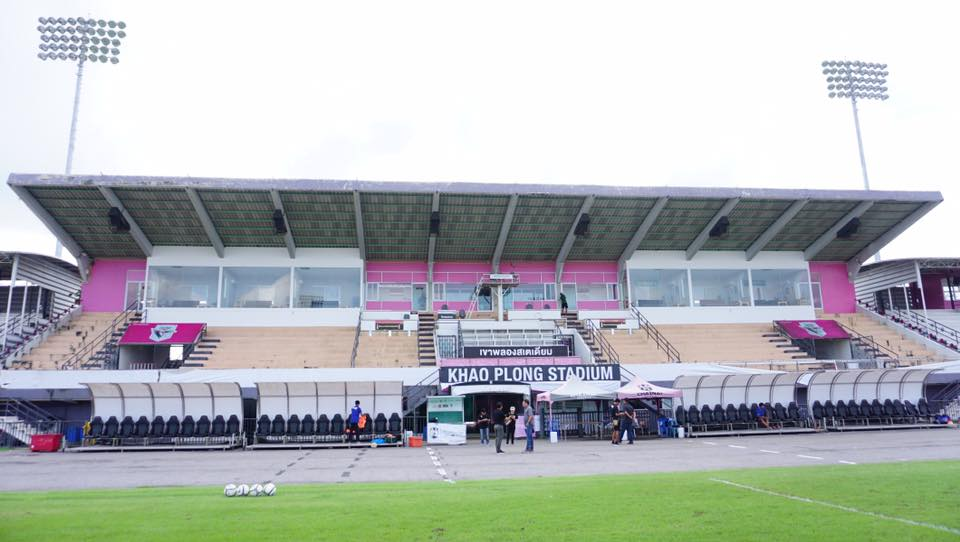

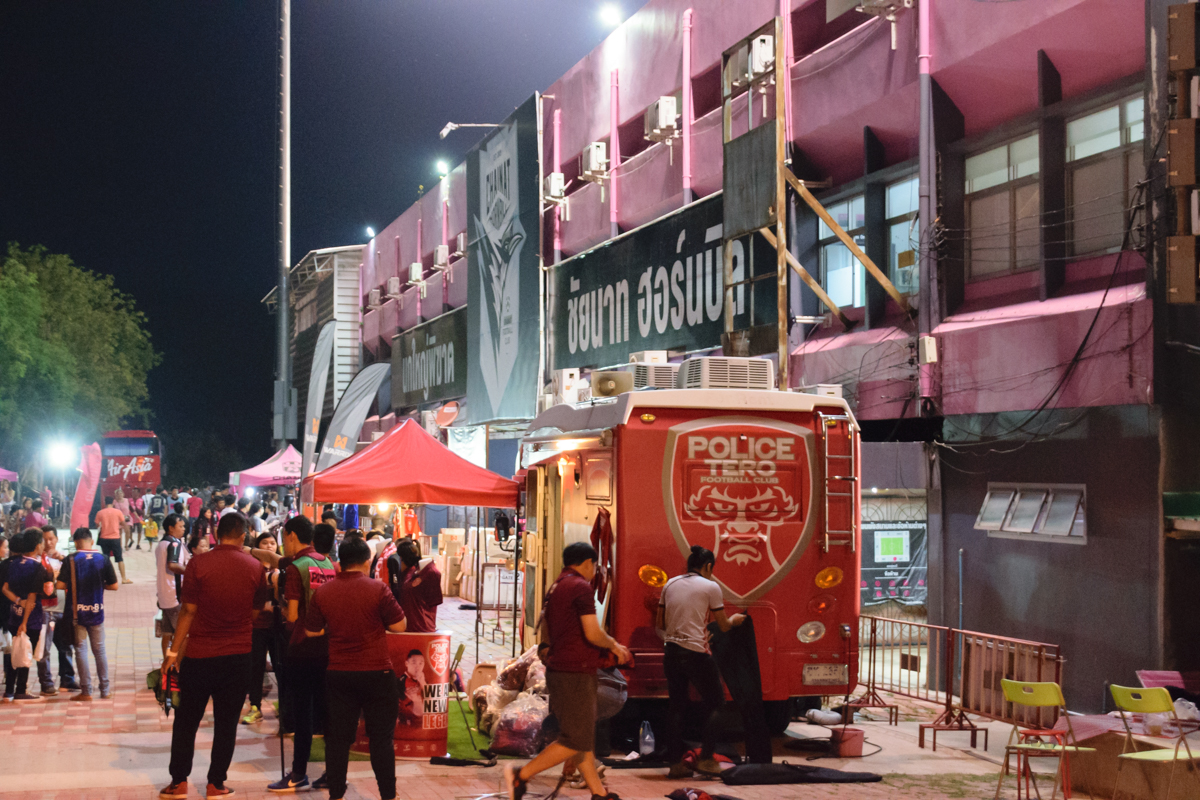
