= Karen national football team =

Football team in Myanmar

Karen
- Association: Karen Football Association
- Confederation: ConIFA

The Karen national football team represents the Karen people, an ethnic group in Kayin State, Myanmar. It is based in Saint Paul, Minnesota, and is controlled by the Karen Football Association. They are not affiliated with FIFA and therefore cannot compete for the FIFA World Cup. Instead, they are part of ConIFA and can compete in their competitions.

== History ==
Karen joined ConIFA in 2019.
