= Assumption United F.C. =

Thai football club

Assumption United อัสสัมชัญ ยูไนเต็ด
- Full name: Assumption United Football Club สโมสรฟุตบอล ธนบุรี ยูไนเต็ด
- Nicknames: The Magnate (เจ้าสัวน้อย)
- Founded: 2011; 15 years ago
- Ground: Assumption College Thonburi Stadium (สนามกีฬาว่องประชานุกูล)
- Capacity: 1,200
- Chairman: Arun Kongjaroen
- Manager: Narongrit Khuntip
- League: Thai League 3
- 2025–26: Thai League 3, 6th of 11 in the Western region
Home colours	Away colours

Assumption United Football Club (Thai สโมสรฟุตบอลอัสสัมชัญ ยูไนเต็ด) is a Thailand semi professional football club based in Bangkok. The club is currently playing in the Thai League 3 Western region.

== History ==
In 2022, Assumption United competed in the Thai League 3 for the 2022–23 season. It is their 12th season in the professional league. The club started the season with a 2–0 home win over Angthong and they ended the season with a 1–2 away defeat to Angthong. The club has finished 9th place in the league of the Western region.

== Stadium and locations ==
Coordinates	Location	Stadium	Capacity	Year
13°38′42″N 100°24′39″E	Bang Khun Thian, Bangkok	The PAC Sport Center Stadium	1,000	2011
13°44′03″N 100°22′14″E	Thonburi, Bangkok	Assumption Thonburi School Stadium	1,000	2012–2014
13°55′05″N 100°32′51″E	Pak Kret, Nonthaburi	SCG Stadium	15,000	2015
13°44′03″N 100°22′14″E	Thonburi, Bangkok	Assumption Thonburi School Stadium	1,000	2016–2017

== Season by season record ==
Season	League									FA Cup	League Cup	T3 Cup	Top goalscorer	
Season	Division	P	W	D	L	F	A	Pts	Pos	FA Cup	League Cup	T3 Cup	Name	Goals
2011	Bangkok	30	6	11	13	22	42	29	13th	Opted out	Opted out			
2012	Bangkok	34	11	12	11	33	30	45	9th	Opted out	Opted out			
2013	Bangkok	26	10	8	8	33	26	38	6th	Opted out	Opted out			
2014	Bangkok	26	7	8	11	29	36	29	10th	Opted out	Opted out			
2015	Bangkok	26	12	6	8	39	30	42	3rd	R2	Opted out			
2016	West	22	5	10	7	25	26	25	9th	R1	R1			
2017	T4 West	27	14	6	7	46	24	48	4th	Opted out	Opted out		(Thailand) Natpasut Malison	12
2018	T4 West	24	8	4	12	30	35	28	7th	Opted out	Opted out		(Thailand) Chalermsak Ruaygrabue	8
2019	T4 West	24	14	4	6	44	30	46	3rd	Opted out	Opted out		(Thailand) Jakkrit Senkaew (Thailand) Surawut Sutthisak (Japan) Akira Niiho	9
2020–21	T3 West	17	6	2	9	19	20	20	6th	Opted out	Opted out		(Thailand) Chokanan Saima-in	3
2021–22	T3 West	20	8	4	8	28	25	28	5th	Opted out	Opted out		(Thailand) Kakana Khamyok	5
2022–23	T3 West	22	5	6	11	33	48	21	9th	Opted out	Opted out		(Thailand) Krittapak Seangsawat	5
2023–24	T3 West	20	5	4	11	24	35	19	9th	Opted out	Opted out	Opted out	(Thailand) Imron Hayiyusoh	7
2024–25	T3 West	22	6	4	12	25	44	22	9th	Opted out	Opted out	Opted out	(Thailand) Pherawut Inkhow	5
2025–26	T3 West	20	8	4	8	23	22	28	6th	Opted out	Opted out	Opted out	(Brazil) Diego Patrocínio Nogueira Reis, (Thailand) Pitchayut Chaiyosaeng	3

Champions	Runners-up	Promoted	Relegated

== Honours ==
- Khǒr Royal Cup (ถ้วย ข.)
  - Runner-up : 2010

== Players ==
As of 26 September 2024

Note: Flags indicate national team as defined under FIFA eligibility rules; some limited exceptions apply. Players may hold more than one non-FIFA nationality.

No.	Pos.	Nation	Player
4	DF	THA	Donthachai Deephom
5	MF	THA	James Bakron Falconer
6	MF	THA	Danuphon Buppha
7	MF	THA	Panung Suttiprasert
8	MF	THA	Krittapak Seangsawat
9	FW	NED	Emile Linkers
10	FW	THA	Thitiwut Khwanmeechaichana
11	MF	THA	Phuwit Thaseela
12	MF	THA	Nitisak Anulun
13	DF	THA	Nattha Nok Thammakit
14	DF	THA	Jettipat Wongyee
16	MF	THA	Watantyoo Pamorn
17	DF	THA	Tanakorn Ngamdee

No.	Pos.	Nation	Player
18	GK	THA	Supachai Wongsuwan
19	FW	THA	Pherawut Inkhow
20	DF	NGR	Riliwan Okedara
23	MF	THA	Thanaphol Kittinallnchote
25	GK	THA	Danupol Sophap
26	DF	THA	Chanasorn Choklap
37	FW	THA	Tun Thepsatial
42	FW	THA	Phongpech Aiemsaard
47	DF	THA	Rachata Tongdonpum
48	MF	THA	Siradanai Phosri
74	MF	THA	Wongpakorn Jareontaveesuk
77	MF	KOR	Kim Woo-gyum
