= Chanthaburi United F.C. =

Thai football club

Chanthaburi United จันทบุรี ยูไนเต็ด
- Full name: Chanthaburi United Football Club สโมสรฟุตบอลจันทบุรี ยูไนเต็ด
- Nicknames: The Flame Rubies (ทับทิมเพลิง)
- Founded: 2011; 15 years ago, as Kohkwang Football Club; 2020; 6 years ago, as Assawin Kohkwang United Football Club; 2023; 3 years ago, as Chanthaburi United Football Club
- Ground: Rambhai Barni Rajabhat University Stadium; Chanthaburi, Thailand
- Capacity: 2,000
- Chairman: Prayut Wassanawin
- Head Coach: Niwat Siriphokhai
- League: Thai League 3
- 2023–24: Thai League 3, 6th of 11 in the Eastern region

Chanthaburi United Football Club (Thai: สโมสรฟุตบอลจันทบุรี ยูไนเต็ด), is a Thai football club based in Chanthaburi, Thailand.

== History ==
In 2022, Assawin Kohkwang United competed in the Thai League 3 for the 2022–23 season. It is their 4th season in the professional league. The club started the season with a 0–1 away defeat to Bankhai United and they ended the season with a 0–1 home defeat to Bankhai United. The club has finished 10th place in the league of the Eastern region. In addition, in the 2022–23 Thai FA Cup Assawin Kohkwang United was defeated 0–3 by Muangthong United in the third round, causing them to be eliminated and in the 2022–23 Thai League Cup Assawin Kohkwang United was defeated 1–2 by Navy in the second qualification round, causing them to be eliminated too.

== Record ==
Season	League									FA Cup	League Cup	T3 Cup	Top goalscorer	
Season	Division	P	W	D	L	F	A	Pts	Pos	FA Cup	League Cup	T3 Cup	Name	Goals
2016	DIV 3 East	2	0	1	1	3	5	1	15th - 21st	Opted out	Ineligible			
2017	TA East	6	4	1	1	18	7	13	3rd - 4th	R1	Ineligible			
2018	TA East	6	6	0	0	18	5	18	1st	R1	Ineligible		(Thailand) Anon Duksee	4
2019	T4 East	28	18	5	5	51	24	59	2nd	QR	QR2		(Thailand) Chatchai Narkwijit	19
2020–21	T3 East	16	6	3	7	23	28	21	7th	QR	Opted out		(Thailand) Watcharaphon Phochat	5
2021–22	T3 East	22	8	8	6	29	24	32	6th	Opted out	Opted out		(Thailand) Patipat Kamsat	11
2022–23	T3 East	22	5	8	9	19	27	23	10th	R3	QR2		(Thailand) Patipat Kamsat	7
2023–24	T3 East	20	7	4	9	21	21	25	6th	Opted out	QR1	QR1	(Brazil) Emerson da Silva Tavares	10

Champions	Runners-up	Promoted	Relegated

== Players ==
=== Current squad ===
As of 19 December 2023

Note: Flags indicate national team as defined under FIFA eligibility rules; some limited exceptions apply. Players may hold more than one non-FIFA nationality.

No.	Pos.	Nation	Player
2	FW	THA	Mrsirawit Chaiya
3	DF	THA	Taksin Saikaew
4	DF	THA	Bandit Nontasee
6	DF	THA	Surachett Khunnu
7	MF	THA	Ladchok Suppasaetsiri
8	MF	THA	Sutayut Ura
9	FW	THA	Jirawut Saranan
10	MF	THA	Gumalas Kampan (captain)
11	FW	THA	Watcharaphon Phochat
12	GK	THA	Ratchanon Intharavisut
13	DF	CIV	Soumahoro Mafa
14	MF	THA	Somchai Deeprawat
15	MF	THA	Nattawut Ngamthuan
19	MF	THA	Chanachai Saothong
20	MF	THA	Kitsana Sangaroon

No.	Pos.	Nation	Player
22	DF	THA	Chanwit Klungmenee
25	FW	THA	Nirut Phondongnok
36	FW	THA	Atichat Hongthong
39	DF	THA	Petch Laohaserikul
40	MF	THA	Chanin Kesee
45	DF	THA	Phatsakon Fueangfung
53	DF	THA	Apichet Saisow
66	FW	THA	Puree Updulloh
69	FW	GHA	Amagwe Clement Nana
81	GK	THA	Pichate Traipoom
88	MF	THA	Chatdanai Joompra
91	FW	CIV	Kourouma Mohamed
95	FW	THA	Ekkon Luengthong
96	FW	THA	Jaturawit Ponak
99	MF	THA	Surachai Hindee
