= Giorgi Tsimakuridze =

Georgian footballer (born 1983)

Personal information
- Full name: Giorgi Tsimakuridze
- Date of birth: 10 November 1983 (age 43)
- Place of birth: Chkhorotsku, Georgia
- Height: 1.84 m (6 ft 0 in)
- Position: Midfielder

Senior career*
Years	Team	Apps	(Gls)
2001–2006	Stal Alchevsk	110	(4)
2002–2003	Shakhtar-2 Donetsk	16	(0)
2007	Illichivets Mariupol	29	(0)
2007–2009	Zorya Luhansk	25	(2)
2009	Žilina	37	(3)
2010	TOT-CAT	11	(3)
2010–2011	Dinamo Tbilisi	25	(0)
2011	Spartaki Tskhinvali	8	(1)
2012	TTM Chiangmai	12	(1)
2012	Bangkok Glass	11	(1)
2013	Phuket	20	(4)
2014	Paknampho NSRU	12	(1)
2014–2015	Trang	19	(4)
2015–2016	Merani Martvili	30	(8)
2017	Songkhla United		
2018	Merani Martvili	9	(1)
2019	Pattani	2	(1)
2020	Chiangrai City	2	(1)
2020	Surat Thani City	6	(4)
2020–2021	Pattani	5	(1)
- * Club domestic league appearances and goals as of 3 January 2021

Giorgi Tsimakuridze (Georgian: გიორგი ციმაკურიძე; born 10 November 1983, Chkhorotsku) is a professional Georgian football midfielder. Previously played for TOT-CAT as midfielder in Thailand and appeared in Thai premier league all-stars team to play with Atlético Madrid in 2010.
