= Saraburi United F.C. =

Thai football club

Saraburi United สระบุรี ยูไนเต็ด
- Full name: Saraburi United Football Club
- Nicknames: The Warlords (ขุนศึก)
- Founded: 2017; 9 years ago, as Saraburi United F.C.
- Ground: Stadium of National Sports Training Center, Muaklek; Saraburi, Thailand
- Capacity: 2,000
- Coordinates: 14°37′41″N 101°10′06″E
- Owner(s): Saraburi United Co., Ltd.
- Chairman: Chaiyut Tananroj
- Head coach: Yai Nilwong
- League: Thai League 3
- 2025–26: Thai League 3, 11th of 11 in the Central region
- Website: https://www.facebook.com/SARABURIUNITED/

Saraburi United Football Club (Thai: สโมสรฟุตบอล สระบุรี ยูไนเต็ด) is a Thai professional football club based in Muak Lek, Saraburi, Thailand. The club is currently playing in the Thai League 3 Western region.

== Timeline ==
History of events of Saraburi Football Club

Year	Important events
2009	Club admitted to the Regional League Central/East Division; Home games to be played at Ban Mo Stadium; Chusak Sripoom named as the first ever coach of Saraburi

In 2022, Saraburi United competed in the Thai League 3 for the 2022–23 season. It is their 4th season in the professional league. The club started the season with a 1–4 home defeat to Kanchanaburi City and they ended the season with a 0–2 away defeat to Kanchanaburi City. The club has finished 8th place in the league of the Western region.

== Stadium and locations ==
Coordinates	Location	Stadium	Capacity	Year
14°36′46″N 100°44′24″E	Saraburi	Ban Mo District Stadium	—N/a	2009
14°33′24″N 100°54′17″E	Saraburi	Saraburi PAO. Stadium	6,000	2010–2015
14°37′41″N 101°10′06″E	Saraburi	Stadium of National Sports Training Center, Muaklek	—N/a	2017–

== Season by season record ==
Season	League									FA Cup	League Cup	T3 Cup	Top scorer	
Season	Division	P	W	D	L	F	A	Pts	Pos	FA Cup	League Cup	T3 Cup	Name	Goals
2009	Central&East	22	11	8	3	13	27	41	3rd	Opted out	Opted out		—N/a	—N/a
2010	Central&East	30	18	7	5	71	30	61	1st	Opted out	Opted out		(Guinea) Kanisso Camara	27
2011	DIV 1	34	12	14	8	41	31	50	7th	R2	Opted out		(South Korea) Choi Jae-won	9
2012	DIV 1	34	11	8	15	49	52	41	12th	Opted out	R1		(Thailand) Supakorn Naknoi	16
2013	DIV 1	34	12	11	11	49	42	47	7th	R2	Opted out		(Ivory Coast) Bernard Doumbia	14
2014	DIV 1	34	16	13	5	55	38	61	2nd	R2	Opted out		(Ivory Coast) Bernard Doumbia, (Thailand) Suriyakarn Chimjeen	12
2015	TPL	34	8	11	15	41	56	35	14th	R2	R2		(Ivory Coast) Bireme Diouf	6
Saraburi United F.C.
2018	TA West	3	3	0	0	10	1	9	1st	Opted out	Opted out		—N/a	—N/a
2019	T4 West	24	9	7	8	41	34	34	4th	Opted out	Opted out		(Thailand) Suriyakarn Chimjeen	11
2020–21	T3 West	17	4	7	6	19	34	19	8th	Opted out	Opted out		(Brazil) Caíque Freitas Ribeiro	10
2021–22	T3 West	20	14	3	3	36	17	45	1st	QR	QR2		(Brazil) Douglas Tardin	9
2022–23	T3 West	22	8	4	10	29	33	28	8th	Opted out	Opted out		(Thailand) Natthawut Sukaram	6
2023–24	T3 West	20	11	3	6	39	22	36	4th	Opted out	QR2	Opted out	(Brazil) Edson dos Santos Costa Júnior	7
2024–25	T3 Central	20	3	7	10	22	39	16	11th	Opted out	QR1	LP	(United States) Adoo Daniel Ikuukunee	6
2025–26	T3 Central	20	2	4	14	19	50	10	11th	Opted out	QR2	Opted out	(Thailand) Nattapoom Maya (Thailand) Phadungkiat Artkitkarn	4

Champions	Runners-up	Third place	Promoted	Relegated

- P = Played
- W = Games won
- D = Games drawn
- L = Games lost
- F = Goals for
- A = Goals against
- Pts = Points
- Pos = Final position
- N/A = No answer
- TPL = Thai Premier League
- QR1 = First Qualifying Round
- QR2 = Second Qualifying Round
- QR3 = Third Qualifying Round
- QR4 = Fourth Qualifying Round
- RInt = Intermediate Round
- R1 = Round 1
- R2 = Round 2
- R3 = Round 3
- R4 = Round 4
- R5 = Round 5
- R6 = Round 6
- GR = Group stage
- QF = Quarter-finals
- SF = Semi-finals
- RU = Runners-up
- S = Shared
- W = Winners

== Players ==
=== Current squad ===
As of 1 September 2025

Note: Flags indicate national team as defined under FIFA eligibility rules; some limited exceptions apply. Players may hold more than one non-FIFA nationality.

No.	Pos.	Nation	Player
1	GK	THA	Ittikorn Kularb
2	DF	THA	Suppanyoo Hernmek
3	DF	THA	Phakphum Manomai
4	DF	THA	Dechanon Srimeaung
5	DF	THA	Yuttapong Srilakorn
6	DF	THA	Suriya Pongprung
7	MF	THA	Jeerawat Ardlaor
8	MF	THA	Suppalerk Anthony Simpson
10	FW	THA	Kroekrit Thaweekarn
11	FW	THA	Atikan Phanprahas
12	MF	THA	Thirawit Chakoti

No.	Pos.	Nation	Player
13	MF	THA	Kittisak Paesai
14	MF	THA	Piyapong Phanphairoj
16	DF	THA	Anucha Somonwat
17	MF	THA	Witchakon Khonphakwaen
18	GK	THA	Yanothai Chaimchai
20	FW	THA	Ratchata Kanyaphot
21	MF	THA	Prakit Deeprom
22	FW	THA	Intuch Toowittayakarn
23	DF	THA	Siraphat Detthanu
25	GK	THA	Supapitch Dankhattiyaanan
26	MF	THA	Pharuahat Chanpaisansilp

== Staff and management ==
Position	Name
Chairman	(Thailand) Bunsong Kerdlam
Vice president	(Thailand) Ekachai Boonphen
vice president	(Thailand) Pataporn Prompol
Manager	(Thailand) Ritthipong Kaewnok
Assistant Manager	(Thailand) Sayan Rubkhamtuk
Assistant Manager	(Thailand) Phoneka Noksamrong
Head coach	(Thailand) Yai Nilwong
Assistant coach	(Thailand) Kirati Keawsombat
Goalkeeper coach	(Thailand) Suriyon Thammajinda
Head of Security	(Thailand) Piyapong Yuttam
Public Relations Officer	(Thailand) Ratchakit Sapkitchanon
L.O.C	(Thailand) Somporn Phuanghiran

== Honours ==
=== Domestic leagues ===
- Thai League 2
  - Runners-up (1): 2014
- Thai League 3 Western Region
  - Winners (1): 2021–22
- Regional League Central-East Division
  - Winners (1) : 2010
