= Chainat United F.C. =

Thai football club

Chainat United ชัยนาท ยูไนเต็ด
- Full name: Chainat United Football Club ชัยนาท ยูไนเต็ด
- Nickname: The Bird Warrior
- Founded: 2016; 10 years ago
- Ground: Nong Mamong Stadium; Chai Nat, Thailand
- Head Coach: Firdaus Kassim
- League: Thailand Semi-pro League
- 2023–24: Thai League 3, 11th of 11 in the Western region (relegated)

Chainat United Football Club (Thai ชัยนาท ยูไนเต็ด), is a Thai football club based in Chai Nat Province, Thailand. The club is currently playing in the Thai League 3. The head coach of the club is Firdaus Kassim

== History ==
In 2022, Chainat United competed in the Thai League 3 for the 2022–23 season. It is their 4th season in the professional league. The club started the season with a 3–3 home draw with Dragon Pathumwan Kanchanaburi and they ended the season with a 0–1 away defeat to Dragon Pathumwan Kanchanaburi. The club has finished 5th place in the league of the Western region. In addition, in the 2022–23 Thai FA Cup Chainat United was defeated 0–2 by Phitsanulok in the qualification round, causing them to be eliminated.

== Stadium and locations by season ==
Coordinates	Location	Stadium	Capacity	Year
15°16′26″N 99°52′05″E	Chai Nat	Nong Mamong Stadium	1000	2018–

== Record ==
Season	League									FA Cup	League Cup	T3 Cup	Top goalscorer	
Season	Division	P	W	D	L	F	A	Pts	Pos	FA Cup	League Cup	T3 Cup	Name	Goals
2016	DIV 3 North	4	2	1	1	4	5	7	3rd	Opted out	Ineligible			
2017	TA Central	7	5	2	0	25	8	17	1st	R1	Ineligible		(Thailand) Rachata Boonprik	10
2018	T4 West	24	9	5	10	33	33	32	5th	R2	QR1		(Thailand) Natthapat Rak-yu	10
2019	T4 West	24	16	3	5	53	29	51	2nd	QF	1st QF		(Thailand) Thanayut Jittabud	10
2021–22	T3 West	20	3	10	7	17	28	19	9th	R1	QRP		(Thailand) Satid Sriutai	3
2022–23	T3 West	22	10	5	7	36	28	35	5th	QR	Opted out		(Thailand) Kitti Kinnonkok	13
2023–24	T3 West	20	0	0	20	5	126	0	11th	Opted out	Opted out	R1	(Thailand) Phuwich Tadporn	2

Champions	Runners-up	Promoted	Relegated
