= Samutsongkhram F.C. =

Thai football club

Samut Songkhram สมุทรสงคราม
- Full name: Samut Songkhram Football Club สโมสรฟุตบอลจังหวัดสมุทรสงคราม
- Nicknames: The Raging Mackerel (ปลาทูคะนอง)
- Short name: SMSK
- Founded: 2005; 21 years ago
- Ground: Samut Songkhram Stadium; Samut Songkhram, Thailand
- Capacity: 6,000
- League: Thailand Semi-pro League
- 2022–23: Thai League 3, 2nd of 12 in the Western region
Home colours	Away colours	Third colours

Samut Songkhram Football Club (Thai: สโมสรฟุตบอลจังหวัดสมุทรสงคราม) is a Thai professional football club based in Samut Songkhram. The club is currently playing in the Thailand Semi-pro League Western region.

The official team colours are light blue and white, and the nickname is Pla-Tu-Kha-Nong which Pla thu refers to the Shortbodied mackerel, and Kha-Nong is the Thai language meaning Rage. Another less common nickname is Mae Klong, referring to a river in western Thailand which flows in Samut Songkhram.

== History ==
The team were founded in 2005 and joined the Thailand Provincial League, the club only needs one year to gain promotion to Thai Division 1 League by finishing runners-up in the league table in 2006.

In their first season of Thai Division 1 League, they finished runners-up in the league table group B and went to reach 4th place in final league table, and were promoted to Thailand's top flight the Thai Premier League.

The club finished 7th in their first season of top tier of the Thai football. In the following year they finished 10th.

In 2010 season, Samut Songkhram is sponsored by The Siam Cement Group (SCG). The club went on finishing the season at 8th place of the league table. SCG support the team until season 2011 after SCG left, financial problem happened with the club.

In 2018, Club-licensing of this team didn't pass to play 2018 Thai League 2. This team were relegated to 2018 Thai League 4 Western Region.

In 2022, Samut Songkhram competed in the Thai League 3 for the 2022–23 season. It is their 16th season in the professional league. The club started the season with a 4–1 home win over Hua Hin City and they ended the season with a 2–1 away win over Hua Hin City. The club has finished 2nd place in the league of the Western region and advanced to the national championship stage. In addition, in the 2022–23 Thai FA Cup Samut Songkhram was defeated 0–10 by Nakhon Ratchasima Mazda in the second round, causing them to be eliminated and in the 2022–23 Thai League Cup Samut Songkhram was defeated 1–2 by Ratchaburi in the quarter-finals, causing them to be eliminated too.

== Stadium ==
Samut Songkhram Stadium is the home stadium of the club, the stadium holds 6,000 people.

== Stadium and locations by season records ==
Coordinates	Location	Stadium	Capacity	Year
13°24′51″N 99°59′59″E	Samut Songkhram	Samut Songkhram Stadium	5,000	2007–2013
13°46′58″N 100°33′22″E	Bangkok	Thai Army Sports Stadium	20,000	2014
13°24′51″N 99°59′59″E	Samut Songkhram	Samut Songkhram Stadium	6,000	2015–2017

== Season by season record ==
Season	League									FA Cup	League Cup	Top scorer	
Season	Division	P	W	D	L	F	A	Pts	Pos	FA Cup	League Cup	Name	Goals
2007	DIV 1	22	13	5	4	37	22	44	2nd				
2008	TPL	30	11	10	9	35	31	43	7th			(Thailand) Songwut Buapetch	7
2009	TPL	30	9	7	14	22	31	31	10th	R3		(Thailand) Songwut Buapetch	5
2010	TPL	30	11	9	10	27	32	42	8th	R4		(Thailand) Panuwat Yimsa-ngar	7
2011	TPL	34	8	12	14	31	45	36	15th	R5		(Thailand) Choklap Nilsang	6
2012	TPL	34	12	10	12	37	39	46	7th	R4		(Ivory Coast) Bireme Diouf	11
2013	TPL	32	6	12	14	22	41	30	16th	R4		(Ghana) Gilbert Koomson	6
2014	TPL	38	5	4	29	32	81	19	20th	R4		(Haiti) Pascal Millien (Nigeria) Samuel Ajayi	6
2015	DIV 1	38	13	11	14	55	53	50	12th	R4	R1	(Ivory Coast) Marc Landry Babo	18
2016	DIV 1	27	4	7	16	26	61	19	15th	R1	R1	(Brazil) David Bala	6
2017	T2	32	9	8	15	42	57	35	14th	R3	QRP	(Brazil) André Araujo (Togo) Andre Houma (Thailand) Phuwadol Suwannachart (Thailand) Warayut Klomnak	4
2018	T4 West	24	10	8	6	28	29	38	4th	R1	Not enter	(Thailand) Woraphot Somsang (Iran) Mirzajani Tafreshi Nima	6
2019	T4 West	24	7	5	12	27	40	26	6th	QF	2nd QF	(Thailand) Sittichai Pankoo	7
2020–21	T3 West	16	4	5	7	12	23	17	10th	R1	Not enter	(Ghana) Amagwe Clement Nana	4
2021–22	T3 West	20	5	4	11	17	32	19	10th	QR	QRP	(Thailand) Thakorn Wikayaphan	3
2022–23	T3 West	22	16	4	2	42	22	52	2nd	R2	QF	(Brazil) Jhonatan Bernardo	9

Champions	Runners-up	Third place	Promoted	Relegated

- P = Played
- W = Games won
- D = Games drawn
- L = Games lost
- F = Goals for
- A = Goals against
- Pts = Points
- Pos = Final position
- TPL = Thai Premier League
- QR1 = First Qualifying Round
- QR2 = Second Qualifying Round
- QR3 = Third Qualifying Round
- QR4 = Fourth Qualifying Round
- RInt = Intermediate Round
- R1 = Round 1
- R2 = Round 2
- R3 = Round 3
- R4 = Round 4
- R5 = Round 5
- R6 = Round 6
- GR = Group stage
- QF = Quarter-finals
- SF = Semi-finals
- RU = Runners-up
- S = Shared
- W = Winners

== Players ==
=== Current squad ===
As of 20 February 2023

Note: Flags indicate national team as defined under FIFA eligibility rules; some limited exceptions apply. Players may hold more than one non-FIFA nationality.

No.	Pos.	Nation	Player
2	DF	THA	Tanat Wangmee
5	MF	THA	Aekkamon Kaewsuriyaaram
7	MF	THA	Singkhon Mangkhut
8	DF	THA	Watcharaphon Srinin
9	FW	THA	Naphat Thamrongsupakorn
10	FW	THA	Thakorn Wiggyapan
11	DF	THA	Thiraphat Khwanrot
14	MF	THA	Korawich Voratat
15	DF	THA	Warit Chimmale
17	MF	THA	Apipu Tornoraut
18	GK	THA	Thanatorn Kuchana
22	MF	THA	Rangsan Janoon
25	DF	THA	Khomsan Theprattanasuda
26	DF	THA	Sanphet Phichaikan

No.	Pos.	Nation	Player
27	MF	THA	Muhamadasman Satoh
29	FW	THA	Rawi Udomsin
32	DF	THA	Nithirot Sukuma
33	DF	THA	Tanawat Mahaveerarat
36	FW	THA	Rattanachai Tawatchai
38	FW	THA	Sittichai Pankoo
39	GK	THA	Nuchit Chaichana
44	DF	THA	Panya Rongnuan
74	MF	THA	Archawin Sungnoen
88	FW	RUS	Evgeni Kabaev
89	FW	THA	Wongpakorn Jareontaveesuk
91	DF	THA	Thiranan Srirat
67	GK	THA	Sillapapong Youngrod
98	MF	BRA	Raphael de Oliveira Manhães

== Honours ==
=== Domestic leagues ===
Thai Division 1 League:

- Runners-up (1): 2007
