= Saraburi Stadium =

Sporting venue

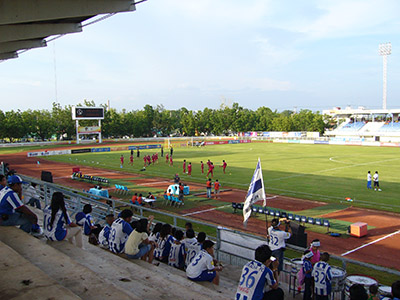
- Interactive map of Saraburi Stadium
- Location: Saraburi, Thailand
- Coordinates: 14°33′24″N 100°54′17″E
- Owner: Saraburi Municipality
- Operator: Saraburi Municipality
- Capacity: 6,000
- Surface: Grass

Construction
- Opened: N/A

Tenants
- Osotspa Saraburi 2010-2012; Saraburi 2010-2012

Saraburi Stadium or Saraburi Provincial Administrative Organization Stadium (Thai: สนามกีฬากลางจังหวัดสระบุรี หรือ สนาม อบจ.สระบุรี), is a stadium located in Saraburi, Thailand. It is currently used for football matches. The stadium holds 6,000 spectators.
