= Samut Songkhram Stadium =

Sports venue in Thailand

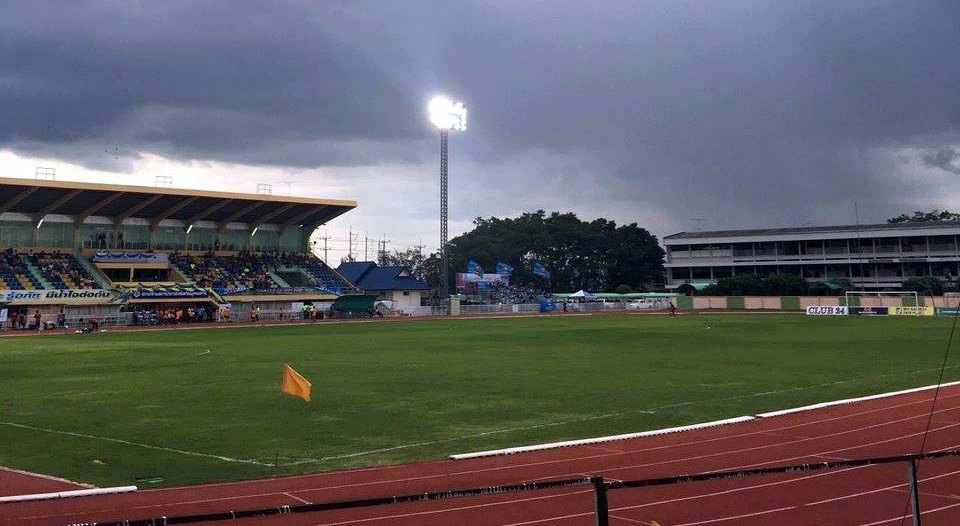
- Interactive map of Samut Songkhram Stadium
- Location: Samut Songkhram, Thailand
- Coordinates: 13°24′51″N 99°59′59″E
- Owner: Samut Songkhram Province
- Operator: Samut Songkhram Province
- Capacity: 6,000
- Surface: Grass

Tenants
- Samutsongkhram F.C. (2005–2023); Samut Songkhram City F.C. (2024–present); IPE Samut Sakhon United (2016)

Samut Songkhram Stadium (Thai: สนามกีฬากลางจังหวัดสมุทรสงคราม หรือ สนาม อบจ.สมุทรสงคราม) is a multi-use stadium in Samut Songkhram Province, Thailand. It is used mostly for football matches and is the home stadium of Samutsongkhram F.C. of Thai League 2. The stadium holds 6,000 people.
