= 2022–23 Thai FA Cup =

Chang FA Cup

Tournament details
- Country: Thailand
- Dates: 21 September 2022 – 28 May 2023
- Teams: 125

Final positions
- Champions: Buriram United (6th title)
- Runners-up: Bangkok United

Tournament statistics
- Matches played: 124
- Goals scored: 537 (4.33 per match)
- Top goal scorer(s): Ibrahim Konaré, Tanet Saengthong (6 goals)

Awards
- Best player: Supachai Chaided

The 2022–23 Thai FA Cup is the 29th season of a Thailand's knockout football competition. The tournament was sponsored by Chang, and known as the Chang FA Cup (Thai: ช้าง เอฟเอคัพ) for sponsorship purposes. The tournament is organized by the Football Association of Thailand. 125 clubs were accepted into the tournament, and it began with the qualification round on 21 September 2022 and concluded with the final on 28 May 2023. The winner would have qualified for the 2023–24 AFC Champions League play-off and the 2023 Thailand Champions Cup.

== Calendar ==
Round	Date	Matches	Clubs	New entries this round
Qualification round	21–28 September 2022	13	3 + 7 + 16 → 13	3 2022–23 Thai League 2; 7 2022–23 Thai League 3; 16 Thailand Amateur League
First round	21 September 2022 and 5 October 2022	48	13 + 13 + 29 + 41 → 48	13 2022–23 Thai League 2; 29 2022–23 Thai League 3; 41 Thailand Amateur League
Second round	1–2 November 2022	32	48 + 16 → 32	16 2022–23 Thai League 1
Third round	30 November 2022 and 1 December 2022	16	32 → 16	
Fourth round	8 February 2023	8	16 → 8	
Quarter-finals	1 March 2023	4	8 → 4	
Semi-finals	19 April 2023	2	4 → 2	
Final	28 May 2023	1	2 → Champions	
Total				125 clubs

== Results ==
Note: T1: Clubs from Thai League 1; T2: Clubs from Thai League 2; T3: Clubs from Thai League 3; TA: Clubs from Thailand Amateur League.

=== Qualification round ===
There were 3 clubs from 2022–23 Thai League 2, 7 clubs from 2022–23 Thai League 3, and 16 clubs from Thailand Amateur League that have signed to qualify for 2022–23 Thai FA cup. This round had drawn on 14 September 2022. 75 goals occurred in this round.

21 September 2022	Kamphaengphet (T3)	1–1 (5–4 p)	Rayong (T2)	Mueang, Kamphaengphet
15:30 (UTC+7)	Phuwadet Buasika 50'	Report	Joseph Obama 48'	Stadium: Kamphaengphet PAO. Stadium; Attendance: 150; Referee: Wathanyu Morin; Assistant referees: Nissan Janthep, Natthawut Tasmak; Fourth official: Putthipong Issising
	Penalties
	Wiroch Manoi (penalty scored); Phuwadet Buasika (penalty scored); Ratthapong Aocharot (penalty scored); Yodpon Manojit (penalty missed); Suradet Chanthapet (penalty scored); Yusuke Suzuki (penalty scored)		(penalty scored) Saharat Rattanawijit; (penalty scored) Phanuwit Jitsanoh; (penalty scored) Anuwat Nakkasem; (penalty scored) Thammawat Trailum; (penalty missed) Jakrayut Vivatvanit; (penalty missed) Nawaphonn Sonkham

28 September 2022	Namphong United (TA)	0–11	Vachiralai United (TA)	Mueang, Khon Kaen
15:30 (UTC+7)		Report	Nuttawat Deephichai 14', 19'; Chutidet Wachirodom 35'; Thanakon Saenkham 36'; Dhanabodee Thongtong 45', 76', 81'; Jetsada Sunthon 50' (o.g.); Yannakit Kiti 56'; Buruettep Chaiwut 60'; Thachakon Kaewkamonmas 78'	Stadium: Khon Kaen Sports School Stadium; Referee: Teeramate Pooprang; Assistant referees: Tanade Intasan, Chinnawat Kaiyasit; Fourth official: Jarin Yawapee

28 September 2022	Kasetsart Academy (TA)	1–6	Ayothaya Warrior (TA)	Khlong Luang, Pathum Thani
15:30 (UTC+7)	Phattharichatr Sirirak 90+2'	Report	Tanet Saengthong 2', 12', 24'; Tanakorn Ketkanjano 81', 84'; Thitikorn Sapborworn 90+1'	Stadium: Stadium of Valaya Alongkorn Rajabhat University; Attendance: 120; Referee: Aidsara Gaedthai; Assistant referees: Chanin Sornsuda, Surathat Sanont; Fourth official: Dassakhon Hokla

28 September 2022	AES Moonlight (TA)	6–2	TK Academy (TA)	Sai Mai, Bangkok
15:30 (UTC+7)	Manuchet Wansa 25', 27', 48', 67'; Damrong Aiemdang 32'; Sathian Rairat 80'	Report	Teerapong Jomkor 11', 82'	Stadium: Grakcu United Stadium; Attendance: 50; Referee: Thapana Thaworn; Assistant referees: Suthipong Teekhasuk, Kiadtisak Janmol; Fourth official: Poomnapat Athan

28 September 2022	Roi Et 2018 (TA)	2–0	MH Nakhon Si City (T3)	Mueang, Roiet
15:30 (UTC+7)	Thawatchai Tusakad 28'; Wijit Boonponlikit 41'	Report		Stadium: Roiet Provincial Stadium; Referee: Watcharachat Loumpool; Assistant referees: Yodtawee Ridsri, Ponlakrit Wangkoon; Fourth official: Bowornthat Duangkaew

28 September 2022	Phitsanulok (T3)	2–0	Chainat United (T3)	Wat Bot, Phitsanulok
15:30 (UTC+7)	Kunburus Sounses 84'; Watcharin Yailoet 90+5'	Report		Stadium: H2H Sport Stadium; Attendance: 160; Referee: Nattawut Pornchaiwirun; Assistant referees: Phattharaphon Chaknam-arng, Michai Changhirai; Fourth official: Tanavit Prompet

28 September 2022	Surin City (T3)	5–0	Thonburi Forest (TA)	Mueang, Surin
15:30 (UTC+7)	Jattuphon Nueakaew 7' (pen.), 12', 31'; Kaettiyot Baisrithong 34', 35'	Report		Stadium: Sri Narong Stadium; Attendance: 150; Referee: Nattipong Jaimuang; Assistant referees: Supachai Sanoi, Nopphadet Rangkrathok; Fourth official: Preecha Chuchartchuart

28 September 2022	Pakchong SCK (TA)	1–6	Prime Bangkok (T3)	Muaklek, Saraburi
15:30 (UTC+7)	Jakkit Chaypimay 83'	Report	Chawanwit Saelao 8', 64'; Panupong Wongpila 55'; Apidet Janngam 57'; Chaithat Maneein 67'; Poppol Zeemadee 88'	Stadium: National Sports Training Center Muaklek Stadium; Referee: Virittpol Pluemsilp; Assistant referees: Kittichok Huthip, Ladda Yutiputi; Fourth official: Kittichai Huthip

28 September 2022	Donmueng (TA)	3–6	FC Hallelujah (TA)	Lam Luk Ka, Pathum Thani
15:30 (UTC+7)	Thanapat Pongsatit 67'; Santipong Vongviboon 73'; Puriwat Thirapornpongsiri 79' (pen.)	Report	Tiwtat Wongpueng 9'; Thammathon Narikham 12', 18', 41', 90+6'; Natthawut Wongthongkham 69'	Stadium: Thupatemi Stadium; Referee: Niruch Panjontuk; Assistant referees: Waranon Soonsuwan, Opas Intaviset; Fourth official: Danai Yommool

28 September 2022	Muangmin United (TA)	1–3	See Khwae City (T3)	Minburi, Bangkok
15:30 (UTC+7)	Channarong Ounpong 52'	Report	Pongsakorn Poonsamrit 50'; Alexander Claude Jacq 66'; Hamzeh Sari 88'	Stadium: Stadium of Kasem Bundit University; Attendance: 140; Referee: Pichit Thongjanmoon; Assistant referees: Pathompong Anunluksanakul, Theerapon Nonthakhamjan; Fourth official: Supiree Testhomya

28 September 2022	Phrae United (T2)	6–0	Wang Noi City (TA)	Mueang, Phrae
17:00 (UTC+7)	Ritthidet Phensawat 2'; Decha Muhammad 6', 36', 89'; Elivélton de Araújo Rego 71', 90+2'	Report		Stadium: Thunghong Subdistrict Municipality Stadium; Attendance: 333; Referee: Direk Kaort; Assistant referees: Songrit Trakulchai, Apichat Prasasak; Fourth official: Samrit Ritkaew

28 September 2022	Lopburi United (TA)	0–0 (5–6 p)	Minburi City (TA)	Mueang, Lopburi
17:00 (UTC+7)		Report		Stadium: Jaifah Academy 1 Stadium; Attendance: 100; Referee: Worapon Sanjan; Assistant referees: Peerapat Jumruspong, Tawan Suriyawong; Fourth official: Saravut Suksalee
	Penalties
	Kitsada Rotchak (penalty scored); Ratchata Kanyaphot (penalty scored); Tharathep Saengjan (penalty scored); Korrapat Numpinit (penalty scored); Konrawit Sueain (penalty scored); Phuriphat Orak (penalty missed)		(penalty scored) Manit Saengchan; (penalty scored) Nawapat Saikomol; (penalty scored) Sumathas Prasitsanpreecha; (penalty scored) Captain Chuachan; (penalty scored) Rachaphoom Rattanawong; (penalty scored) Nonthapat Satchoi

28 September 2022	Nakhon Si United (T2)	12–0	Khunhan United (TA)	Mueang, Nakhon Si Thammarat
18:00 (UTC+7)	Jakkit Niyomsuk 7', 9', 53', 55', 62'; Wasan Samarnsin 14'; Eakkaluk Lungnam 21'; Nattapoom Maya 43', 72'; Narongrit Boonsuk 60'; Apdussalam Saman 68' (pen.), 80'	Report		Stadium: Nakhon Si Thammarat Provincial Stadium; Attendance: 500; Referee: Apirat Kreeso; Assistant referees: Jareon Nunboon, Hanyot Buangrab; Fourth official: Phitsanu Chusi

=== First round ===
The first round would be featured 13 clubs that were the winners of the qualification round including 2 clubs from T2, 5 clubs from T3, and 6 clubs from TA and the new entries including 13 clubs from 2022–23 Thai League 2, 29 clubs from 2022–23 Thai League 3, and 41 clubs from Thailand Amateur League. This round had drawn on 14 September 2022. 210 goals occurred in this round.

21 September 2022	Krabi (T2)	4–0	Udon Thani (T2)	Mueang, Krabi
18:00 (UTC+7)	Techin Mooktarakosa 36'; Badar Ali Rashid Ali Al Alawi 42'; Jean Moser 73'; Narong Jansawek 86'	Report		Stadium: Krabi Provincial Stadium; Attendance: 520; Referee: Watcharin Nootong; Assistant referees: Hanyot Buangrab, Phongsiri Chusi; Fourth official: Phitsanu Chusi

5 October 2022	Uttaradit Saksiam (T3)	2–2 (3–5 p)	Roi Et PB United (TA)	Mueang, Uttaradit
15:00 (UTC+7)	Chatchai Narkwijit 30' (pen.); Phufah Chuenkomrak 81' (pen.)	Report	Saichon Magmesoog 17'; Pongsathon Jitpim 70'	Stadium: Uttaradit Provincial Stadium; Attendance: 134; Referee: Witthaya Kamhem; Assistant referees: Chaiwat Mukda, Tulakan Khamthai; Fourth official: Jirapan Thewa-anukhroh
	Penalties
	Phufah Chuenkomrak (penalty scored); Chatchai Narkwijit (penalty scored); Phontakorn Thosanthiah (penalty scored); Anupap Onglaor (penalty missed)		(penalty scored) Watcharakorn Phochai; (penalty scored) Rewat Khumbun; (penalty scored) Natthaphon Phuangbubphsa; (penalty scored) Vichit Singloilom; (penalty scored) Pongsathon Jitpim

5 October 2022	Bang Khun Thian (TA)	1–6	Samut Sakhon City (T3)	Mueang, Samut Sakhon
15:00 (UTC+7)	Panuwat Chaichot 44'	Report	Wuttichat Yiamming 8', 68'; Woramate Soonamporn 60', 85'; Choktawee Kerdpong 79'; Noppaklao Damrongthai 82'	Stadium: Stadium of Thailand National Sports University, Samut Sakhon Campus; Referee: Yuttana Sadkrathok; Assistant referees: Kunathorn Ketchantra, Kittichok Huthip; Fourth official: Patcharapon Losomsup

5 October 2022	Muang Loei United (T3)	2–2 (4–5 p)	Banbueng (T3)	Mueang, Loei
15:00 (UTC+7)	Kondanai Phomduang 37'; Amporn Chaipong 90+5'	Report	Nuttapong Deeduaychat 25'; Roengchai Kesada 62'	Stadium: Kongsalak Plus Stadium; Attendance: 45; Referee: Anan Keawmuangkhun; Assistant referees: Tanade Intasan, Sutiwat Kaewkhunthong; Fourth official: Manuschai Chawong
	Penalties
	Sirawis Poothawon (penalty missed); Thanakorn Janluy (penalty scored); Omae So (penalty scored); Amporn Chaipong (penalty scored); Aphiwat Chaenban (penalty scored)		(penalty scored) Nicranas Wonganusat; (penalty scored) Tammapet Kangthong; (penalty scored) Anuson Thaloengram; (penalty scored) Thanachai Nathanakool; (penalty scored) Nuttapong Deeduaychat

5 October 2022	Nonthaburi City (TA)	0–8	Songkhla (T3)	Bang Yai, Nonthaburi
15:00 (UTC+7)		Report	Basree Sanron 24', 35'; Peerapat Kantha 28', 57'; Noto Boontawan 64'; Phongchana Kongkirit 72'; Rushdan Katemmadee 89' (pen.); Thanphisit Hempandan 90+2'	Stadium: Nonthaburi Provincial Stadium; Attendance: 70; Referee: Aidsara Gaedthai; Assistant referees: Sujin Rodart, Surathat Sanont; Fourth official: Thanakrit Klapwun

5 October 2022	Surin Khong Chee Mool (T3)	2–1	Uthumporn Chullamanee (TA)	Mueang, Surin
15:00 (UTC+7)	Nattaphol Pho-kam 4'; Amonthep Kamchadphai 15'	Report	Kathawut Wongkan 49'	Stadium: Stadium of Rajamangala University of Technology Isan, Surin Campus; Referee: Nakarin Thongkerd; Assistant referees: Waratchanon Chombun, Wuttichai Nairikul; Fourth official: Natthasit Miwailuem

5 October 2022	Chattrakan City (TA)	4–1	Siam (T3)	Mueang, Phitsanulok
15:00 (UTC+7)	Pathomphon Phutson 19', 23', 29', 53'	Report	Chinnawat Chimun 30'	Stadium: Stadium of Pibulsongkram Rajabhat University; Referee: Thanison Onjiw; Assistant referees: Phattharaphon Chaknam-arng, Phongtep Aonjai; Fourth official: Woottipong Ketkam

5 October 2022	The Zero (TA)	1–5	Futera United (TA)	Lat Krabang, Bangkok
15:00 (UTC+7)	Kittayot Singhanak 78'	Report	Phatsakon Fukfang 41', 69', 76'; Puripat Siriwat 51'; Natthachat Somprasong 66'	Stadium: Stadium of King Mongkut's Institute of Technology Ladkrabang; Referee: Song Montha; Assistant referees: Pathompong Anunluksanakul, Opas Intaviset; Fourth official: Wilawan Rattanakhot

5 October 2022	Primera (TA)	0–1	Dome (TA)	Sathon, Bangkok
15:00 (UTC+7)		Report	Wuthichai Nualloi 31'	Stadium: Stadium of Rajamangala University of Technology Krungthep; Attendance: 230; Referee: Poomnapat Athan; Assistant referees: Suthipong Teekhasuk, Niracha Sangprasit; Fourth official: Danai Yommool

5 October 2022	Jalor City (T3)	6–0	Huasamrong Gateway (TA)	Mueang, Yala
15:00 (UTC+7)	Sakeereen Teekasom 8', 81', 90+2'; Marwan Saleh 60'; Siriphong Wangkulam 69' (pen.), 90'	Report		Stadium: Yala City Municipality Stadium; Attendance: 600; Referee: Watcharin Nootong; Assistant referees: Mayunai Kueteh, Sarwan Karengsana; Fourth official: Pornsak Paksan

5 October 2022	Samut Songkhram (T3)	1–1 (5–4 p)	Vongchavalitkul University (TA)	Bang Sai, Ayutthaya
15:00 (UTC+7)	Naphat Thamrongsupakorn 21'	Report	Natthaphon Ngaopho 43'	Stadium: Ratchakram Stadium; Attendance: 101; Referee: Kittichai Huthip; Assistant referees: Wutthinan Jampawai, Narakorn Sapsuksai; Fourth official: Pichaya Kasem
	Penalties
	Naphat Thamrongsupakorn (penalty scored); Muhamadasman Satoh (penalty scored); Kittipong Saengkaeo (penalty scored); Pichitchai Sienkrthok (penalty scored); Rattanachai Thawatchai (penalty scored)		(penalty scored) Natthaphon Ngaopho; (penalty scored) Wannaphong Bamrungrath; (penalty scored) Worrakan Khemtong; (penalty scored) Tummarat Sikhao; (penalty missed) Thitiwat Traijapo

5 October 2022	Ngob Dang Kamphaengphet (TA)	2–3	Hippo (TA)	Mueang, Kamphaengphet
15:00 (UTC+7)	Thiraphat Chanuwat 67'; Yuttaphong Jornjam 74'	Report	Teerawat Noulpak 16'; Ramin Sritongon 52'; Kridakarn Onprasong 86'	Stadium: Cha Kung Rao Stadium; Attendance: 90; Referee: Bongkod Tiansavang; Assistant referees: Ratthnaon Singkum, Ronachai Raepang; Fourth official: Jackkrit Meekru

5 October 2022	Assawin Kohkwang United (T3)	1–0	Mahasarakham SBT (T3)	Mueang, Chanthaburi
15:00 (UTC+7)	Patipat Kamsat 90+1'	Report		Stadium: Stadium of Rambhai Barni Rajabhat University; Attendance: 100; Referee: Somsuk Poosomnuek; Assistant referees: Arthiwat Phaosali, Puttipong Saensarn; Fourth official: Pongsakorn Wisitsri

5 October 2022	Chanthaburi (T3)	8–0	Nakhonnont United (TA)	Mueang, Chanthaburi
15:00 (UTC+7)	Visit Chuenvanon 3'; Thanaphat Phutnok 10'; Thanadon Supaphon 33', 87'; Kitinun Suttiwiriyakul 50'; Charin Boodhad 60'; Caio Rodrigues da Cruz 63', 64'	Report		Stadium: Chanthaburi Provincial Stadium; Attendance: 72; Referee: Palathip Homwarn; Assistant referees: Palakorn Parasatit, Adisai Pongnairat; Fourth official: Suksan Thongkoed

5 October 2022	Roi Et 2018 (TA)	0–1	Phrae United (T2)	Mueang, Roiet
15:00 (UTC+7)		Report	Ritthidet Phensawat 10'	Stadium: Roiet Provincial Stadium; Referee: Natthwut Nammuang; Assistant referees: Rachan Dawangpa, Narong Hansuk; Fourth official: Amnat Makklang

5 October 2022	Minburi City (TA)	1–7	Prime Bangkok (T3)	Khlong Luang, Pathum Thani
15:00 (UTC+7)	Manit Saengchan 85' (pen.)	Report	Panupong Wongpila 6'; Apidet Janngam 9', 63'; Poppol Zeemadee 49', 59'; Sirisak Promduang 54'; Chawanwit Saelao 78'	Stadium: Stadium of Valaya Alongkorn Rajabhat University; Attendance: 91; Referee: Thapana Thaworn; Assistant referees: Haroot Himbenmut, Ukrit Bung-or; Fourth official: Niwet Mala

5 October 2022	ACDC (T3)	0–0 (3–4 p)	Prachinburi City (TA)	Sattahip, Chonburi
15:00 (UTC+7)		Report		Stadium: Battleship Stadium; Attendance: 100; Referee: Panya Nawasimainam; Assistant referees: Pakorn Srichumsin, Kamphol Kaewsaard; Fourth official: Tanin Reunjit
	Penalties
	Chusana Numkanitsorn (penalty scored); Worachet Bumphenkiattikul (penalty missed); Kanok Kongsimma (penalty scored); Natchapol Jitkasem (penalty scored); Thirawuth Sraunson (penalty missed)		(penalty missed) Arrak Kornsen; (penalty scored) Patinya Chaiaumnuay; (penalty scored) Khamron Phanchaem; (penalty scored) Kittisak Chaisonkhram; (penalty scored) Warut Chitnaree

5 October 2022	Vachiralai United (TA)	1–1 (2–4 p)	Kanchanaburi City (T3)	Mueang, Chiangmai
15:00 (UTC+7)	Rachata Wongkitti 63' (pen.)	Report	Chanin Tonpong 45'	Stadium: Stadium of Thailand National Sports University, Chiangmai Campus; Attendance: 125; Referee: Wuttichai Lo-in; Assistant referees: Pantachai Kantee, Panuwat Khut Jaiwong; Fourth official: Doungkaew Doungtawan
	Penalties
	Phakin Sinmonthakit (penalty missed); Ronnasak Seelapat (penalty scored); Soravit Chotyandon (penalty missed); Nattawut Terdpanasan (penalty scored)		(penalty scored) Than Paing; (penalty scored) Chanin Tonpong; (penalty scored) Pannawat Nitiyajang; (penalty missed) Noppakhun Yingbamrung; (penalty scored) Pornthep Klaiwongpung

5 October 2022	Ayothaya Warrior (TA)	5–0	AES Moonlight (TA)	Phra Nakhon Si Ayutthaya, Ayutthaya
15:00 (UTC+7)	Tanet Saengthong 24', 45+2', 67'; Pariwat Handee 62'; Tananan Konthong 71'	Report		Stadium: Stadium of Rajamangala University of Technology Suvarnabhumi; Attendance: 110; Referee: Virittpol Pluemsilp; Assistant referees: Adisak Thongmaha, Yanin Nanthakampira; Fourth official: Nasri Tamat

5 October 2022	FC Hallelujah (TA)	0–3	See Khwae City (T3)	Si Racha, Chonburi
15:00 (UTC+7)		Report	Alexander Claude Jacq 3'; Songkran Kareesor 73'; Samart Phomee 85'	Stadium: Laem Chabang Municipality Stadium; Attendance: 150; Referee: Theerapon Nakthong; Assistant referees: Chaiwat Rupsa-at, Nararit Srivorakul; Fourth official: Thawatchai Sangsanit

5 October 2022	Amnat Charoen City (TA)	3–2	Kalasin United (TA)	Mueang, Amnat Charoen
15:00 (UTC+7)	Satapon Simuan 13'; Sittisak Nimma 22'; Ratikon Mingchai 56'	Report	Jakkapan Phomson 45+1'; Pisit Nasathit 49'	Stadium: Amnat Charoen Provincial Stadium; Attendance: 220; Referee: Chalermpon Thongsri; Assistant referees: Phaithun Onkhamloon, Athasit Kaewhiang; Fourth official: Warutsom Sompan

5 October 2022	Sattahip (TA)	0–4	Thap Luang United (TA)	Bang Lamung, Chonburi
15:00 (UTC+7)		Report	Thanaphum Khenda 28'; Piyawat Thongman 43'; Nares Ritphitakwong 53', 77'	Stadium: Nong Prue Municipality Stadium 2 Attendance: 90; Referee: Pornthep Promsopa; Assistant referees: Jirayu Jonganuruk, Amnat Rattanapakdee; Fourth official: Chatree Thanasarn

5 October 2022	Chiangmai Country (TA)	1–5	Saimit Kabin United (T3)	Mueang, Chiangmai
15:00 (UTC+7)	Sirichai Nupho 54'	Report	Phuwanart Khamkaew 22'; Sonkritsana Sirimanon 27'; Kaisak Malgal 57' (o.g.); Jariwat Pawatpongsaphaisan 66'; Aitthikorn Borisut 80'	Stadium: Stadium of Rajamangala University of Technology Lanna; Referee: Sarawut Tawiya; Assistant referees: Waranyoo Chomgoson, Akkarachai Khanthalee; Fourth official: Teerapong Oma

5 October 2022	Teerachaipallet Samut Prakan (TA)	1–6	FC Bangsaothong (TA)	Khlong Luang, Pathum Thani
15:00 (UTC+7)	Pooreepat Ekbua 58'	Report	Phatsakorn Srikaewnin 34', 39', 56'; Jiramet Dalunphan 42'; Tilawas Thanomnaew 81'; Kuatrakul Kwankua 90+3'	Stadium: Stadium of Bangkok University; Attendance: 50; Referee: Niruch Panjontuk; Assistant referees: Kullapat Eiamprasert, Kiadtisak Janmol; Fourth official: Trin Sahachaipat

5 October 2022	Wat Bot City (T3)	1–1 (5–4 p)	Bangkok (T3)	Wat Bot, Phitsanulok
15:00 (UTC+7)	Anucha Phantong 90+4'	Report	Nattapan Pansuchat 75'	Stadium: H2H Sport Stadium; Attendance: 65; Referee: Nattawut Pornchaiwirun; Assistant referees: Suttinan Kanchana, Suthipong Ontuwong; Fourth official: Samrit Ritkaew
	Penalties
	Milad Sasani Nezhad (penalty scored); Komsun Sueajouy (penalty scored); Jose Magson Bezerra Dourado (penalty scored); Saran Tadtiang (penalty scored); Anucha Phantong (penalty scored)		(penalty scored) Siwa Phommas; (penalty scored) Bruno Suzuki; (penalty scored) Shawn Sadayu Richardson; (penalty scored) Kiangsak Taobutr; (penalty missed) Wichaya Pornprasart

5 October 2022	Chiangrai (TA)	4–1	Power Kids (TA)	Mueang, Chiangrai
15:00 (UTC+7)	Kiattisak Rotwan 14', 58'; Nattawat Wongprasert 35'; Aekkarach Wutthi 77'	Report	Pongsathorn Klombanjong 86'	Stadium: Chiangrai Provincial Stadium; Attendance: 178; Referee: Supat Chaingam; Assistant referees: Amonthep Pangjay, Saksit Jantain; Fourth official: Teerapong Martip

5 October 2022	Kasem Bundit University (T3)	2–0	Nara United (T3)	Minburi, Bangkok
15:00 (UTC+7)	Attaphon Kannoo 45'; Farid Madsoh 78'	Report		Stadium: Stadium of Kasem Bundit University; Attendance: 200; Referee: Dassakhon Hokla; Assistant referees: Tibeth Longtree, Phattarapon Racha; Fourth official: Anusorn Sangnaed

5 October 2022	Bangkapi (TA)	0–3	Chiangmai United (T2)	Sai Mai, Bangkok
15:00 (UTC+7)		Report	Nantawat Suankaew 5' (pen.); Thana Isor 30'; Aphiwat Hanchai 72'	Stadium: Grakcu Sai Mai Stadium; Attendance: 130; Referee: Suriyo Kanhachalee; Assistant referees: Phariwat Phoyoo, Anucha Pinamon; Fourth official: Natee Choosuwan

5 October 2022	Maple Hotel (TA)	1–3	Nakhon Ratchasima United (T3)	Minburi, Bangkok
15:00 (UTC+7)	Songkit Suti 54'	Report	Bouda Henry Ismaël 3'; Aekkachai Singwong 72'; Nopparat Auraikae 73'	Stadium: 72nd Anniversary Stadium, Minburi; Attendance: 105; Referee: Pichit Thongjanmoon; Assistant referees: Anocha Praphatson, Sopon Boonlest; Fourth official: Apiwich Mukdahan

5 October 2022	Udon United (T3)	3–1	Pattaya Dolphins United (T3)	Mueang, Udon Thani
15:00 (UTC+7)	Nontawat Wannit 24'; Ranieri Luiz Barbosa 57', 90+5'	Report	Supakit Niamkong 30'	Stadium: Stadium of Thailand National Sports University, Udon Thani Campus; Referee: Jirapun Hongsudta; Assistant referees: Saengsuree Pochana, Chinnawat Kottai; Fourth official: Pisal Motongsri

5 October 2022	Rajpracha (T2)	6–0	Phrae (TA)	Thawi Watthana, Bangkok
15:00 (UTC+7)	Ibrahim Konaré 17', 33', 65', 77'; Panudech Maiwong 34'; Teerawut Churok 38'	Report		Stadium: Stadium of Bangkok Thonburi University; Referee: Peeratat Kittikanmetee; Assistant referees: Sadsampan Kunsakoo, Kattiya Saphu; Fourth official: Worapon Sanjan

5 October 2022	Kasetsart (T2)	8–0	Nongkhae Wang Noi Police (TA)	Chatuchak, Bangkok
16:00 (UTC+7)	Chakrit Rawanprakone 15', 22'; Kim Hong 18'; Thanandorn Tianphonkrang 29'; Sutap Thiaymtham 45' (o.g.); Winai Aiemaod 64'; Anusak Laosangthai 75', 90+2'	Report		Stadium: Insee Chantarasatit Stadium; Attendance: 125; Referee: Komgrit Ponpasit; Assistant referees: Nissan Janthep, Khomchalach Lekhawijit; Fourth official: Vitsavet Sangnakorn

5 October 2022	Sisaket City (TA)	1–4	Chiangmai (T2)	Mueang, Sisaket
16:00 (UTC+7)	Wuttichai Tathong 45+1'	Report	Kim Bo-yong 3'; Patrik Gustavsson 34'; Sarawut Koedsri 71'; Thammayut Tonkham 90+1'	Stadium: Sisaket Provincial Stadium; Attendance: 100; Referee: Ruttapol Kongboonwas; Assistant referees: Anupong Sangtopo, Nattapong Wadweangcom; Fourth official: Vitsawa Nanchana

5 October 2022	BSB Pakkret City (TA)	0–4	Customs United (T2)	Bang Phli, Samut Prakan
16:00 (UTC+7)		Report	Phatsaphon Choedvichit 26', 37'; Partchya Katethip 66'; Jirattikan Vapilai 90+2'	Stadium: Lad Krabang 54 Stadium; Attendance: 150; Referee: U-sen Yala; Assistant referees: Suriya Lee-intr, Kantrakorn Ngaosri; Fourth official: Boonsong Prachumrak

5 October 2022	Khelang United (TA)	2–2 (5–4 p)	Star Power (TA)	Mueang, Lampang
16:00 (UTC+7)	Mathas Kajaree 39'; Ronnakorn Inthiya 81'	Report	Teeratada Takham 2', 58'	Stadium: Lampang Provincial Stadium; Referee: Jakkapong Pongpathet; Assistant referees: Kritsawaphong Khamta, Burin Kasemkittikun; Fourth official: Suchart Kuisue
	Penalties
	Mathas Kajaree (penalty scored); Ronnakorn Inthiya (penalty scored); Naphat Camsen (penalty scored); Sirom Gardsrinich (penalty missed); Peeraphat Paleang (penalty scored); Nakrid Sang-on (penalty scored)		(penalty scored) Trin Roengnapaphon; (penalty missed) Nawawit Sriwichai; (penalty scored) Aphithep Thaensopa; (penalty scored) Charuwet Thitkan; (penalty scored) Teeratada Takham; (penalty missed) Pichainon Kawirot

5 October 2022	Sisaket United (T3)	2–1	Samut Prakan (T3)	Mueang, Sisaket
17:00 (UTC+7)	Nonthawat Chaotai 22'; Thaweekun Thong-on 25'	Report	Kritsanapol Booncharee 47'	Stadium: Sri Nakhon Lamduan Stadium; Attendance: 220; Referee: Natthaphon Khodkaew; Assistant referees: Surachart Thasungka, Chinnawat Kaiyasit; Fourth official: Watcharachat Loumpool

5 October 2022	Suphanburi (T2)	11–1	UD Vessuwan (TA)	Mueang, Suphanburi
17:30 (UTC+7)	Phiraphat Khamphaeng 7', 42', 44'; Prasit Pattanatanawisut 19', 82'; Norraseth Lukthong 31', 34'; Peeranat Jantawong 55'; Naphat Rajanpan 59' (pen.); Matheus Souza e Silva 62'; Tanames Jitaicham 76'	Report	Phongsapat Jantatip 74'	Stadium: Suphanburi Provincial Stadium; Attendance: 342; Referee: Satchukorn Saenchu; Assistant referees: Siwat Chaithong, Sarayut Sriampri; Fourth official: Pongthep Raipimai

5 October 2022	Navy (T3)	5–0	AUU Inter Bangkok (T3)	Sattahip, Chonburi
18:00 (UTC+7)	Tepphiphat Thapseang 25'; Allan Machado de Souza Rosa 42'; Wutthinan Thaweerathitsakul 45', 70'; Yang Ju-hun 90'	Report		Stadium: Sattahip Navy Stadium; Attendance: 230; Referee: Suchat Fangmala; Assistant referees: Kodcharat Rattanachot, Narit Mungtoemklang; Fourth official: Kanakorn Teansawat

5 October 2022	Khon Kaen (T3)	2–1	Kanthararom United (TA)	Mueang, Khon Kaen
18:00 (UTC+7)	Punyachotc Namjatturat 25'; Cholakran Chueaprasat 65'	Report	Kiartisak Wantawee 34'	Stadium: Khon Kaen PAO. Stadium; Attendance: 181; Referee: Chairat Phooalai; Assistant referees: Yodtawee Ridsri, Nopphadet Rangkrathok; Fourth official: Teeramate Pooprang

5 October 2022	Warin Chamrap (TA)	1–0	Phachi City (TA)	Mueang, Ubon Ratchathani
18:00 (UTC+7)	Winai Jarukan 21'	Report		Stadium: Stadium of Ubon Ratchathani Rajabhat University; Attendance: 500; Referee: Kulthawat Sisanong; Assistant referees: Suwasan Chanphum, Suriyawong Ramsri; Fourth official: Saharat Juktirit

5 October 2022	Uthai Thani (T2)	2–1	Surindra YMA (TA)	Mueang, Uthai Thani
18:00 (UTC+7)	Prasittichai Perm 13'; Piyaruck Kwangkaew 46'	Report	Kittiphat Deeduangpan 55'	Stadium: Uthai Thani Provincial Stadium; Referee: Wirot Oupachit; Assistant referees: Pramote Boon-in, Natthawut Tasmak; Fourth official: Direk Kaort

5 October 2022	Samut Prakan City (T2)	2–0	Maejo United (T3)	Mueang, Chonburi
18:00 (UTC+7)	Sho Shimoji 22'; Phongsakon Trisat 90+3'	Report		Stadium: Chonburi UTA Stadium; Attendance: 31; Referee: Wichate Tainthong; Assistant referees: Chaiyos Sripak, Watcharasak Intharak; Fourth official: Ekkachai Phetcham

5 October 2022	Chainat Hornbill (T2)	6–0	LP Sai Mai (TA)	Mueang, Chai Nat
18:00 (UTC+7)	Choe Ho-Ju 22', 41'; Kim Byung-oh 45+2'; Akkarapol Meesawat 74', 78'; Kritsada Sriwanit 86'	Report		Stadium: Khao Plong Stadium; Attendance: 350; Referee: Peerasan Krataithong; Assistant referees: Sornram Yutim, Songrit Trakulchai; Fourth official: Wathanyu Morin

5 October 2022	Phitsanulok (T3)	2–0	Surin City (T3)	Mueang, Phitsanulok
18:00 (UTC+7)	Nicolás Vélez 79', 85'	Report		Stadium: Phitsanulok PAO. Stadium; Attendance: 565; Referee: Panumas Phansamo; Assistant referees: Worapong Prasartsri, Thanapon Kanchanaudom; Fourth official: Tanavit Prompet

5 October 2022	Ghost Gate (TA)	3–1	Dragon Pathumwan Kanchanaburi (T3)	Mueang, Chiangmai
18:00 (UTC+7)	Nattapong Meemanee 24', 27'; Kittipong Namsang 90+1'	Report	Teerapat Chadphuk 41'	Stadium: Chiangmai Municipality Stadium; Attendance: 135; Referee: Ekkachai Juywong; Assistant referees: Puttipong Wandee, Samart Thongdonngao; Fourth official: Opars Oomsomsuai

5 October 2022	Nakhon Pathom United (T2)	7–0	Mahajak Samut Prakan (TA)	Mueang, Nakhon Pathom
18:00 (UTC+7)	Mohamed Essam 17', 39'; Chanatat Worapanichakarn 36'; Saman Mohammadzadeh 41'; Supatep Khamseang 54'; Phuwanet Thongkhui 71'; Thirawat Khoonsom 78' (pen.)	Report		Stadium: Stadium of Nakhon Pathom Municipality Sport School; Attendance: 350; Referee: Kristin Saisombat; Assistant referees: Chaowalit Poonprasit, Sahatnet Deemongkol; Fourth official: Saravut Suksalee

5 October 2022	Ayutthaya United (T2)	6–0	Nakhon Ratchasima College (TA)	Phra Nakhon Si Ayutthaya, Ayutthaya
18:00 (UTC+7)	Danuson Wijitpunya 9', 22', 52'; Thiago Duchatsch 33'; Jakkapan Pornsai 78'; Kueanun Junumpai 90'	Report		Stadium: Ayutthaya Provincial Stadium; Attendance: 426; Referee: Putthipong Issising; Assistant referees: Kriangsak Pimsanit, Thanet Jairaw; Fourth official: Alongkorn Khonwai

5 October 2022	Nakhon Si United (T2)	1–3	Kamphaengphet (T3)	Mueang, Nakhon Si Thammarat
18:00 (UTC+7)	Phillerson Natan Silva de Oliveira 71' (pen.)	Report	Khwanchai Bunprakhom 12'; Yan Lin Aung 42'; Woramat Roopngam 52'	Stadium: Nakhon Si Thammarat Provincial Stadium; Attendance: 400; Referee: Sapuding Kalong; Assistant referees: Jareon Nunboon, Hanyot Buangrab; Fourth official: Phitsanu Chusi

=== Second round ===
The second round would be featured 48 clubs that were the winners of the first round including 13 clubs from T2, 21 clubs from T3, and 14 clubs from TA and the new entries that were 16 clubs from 2022–23 Thai League 1. This round had drawn on 10 October 2022. 138 goals occurred in this round.

1 November 2022	Muangthong United (T1)	7–1	Hippo (TA)	Pak Kret, Nonthaburi
19:00 (UTC+7)	Phumin Kaewta 2'; Eric Johana Omondi 25'; Ekanit Panya 45'; Adisak Kraisorn 51'; Korawich Tasa 60', 73'; Punnawat Chote-jirachaithon 83'	Report; Highlight	Chawan Pansawat 90+3'	Stadium: Thunderdome Stadium; Attendance: 1,213; Referee: Phairot Bunkamnoed; Assistant referees: Poonsawat Samransuk, Watthana Chonchanakul; Fourth official: Wicharn Klinthaworn

2 November 2022	Thap Luang United (TA)	2–4	Ayutthaya United (T2)	Kamphaeng Saen, Nakhon Pathom
15:00 (UTC+7)	Thanaphum Khenda 81'; Wasathon Aumyen 90+1'	Report	Danuson Wijitpunya 29', 63' (pen.); Arnont Pumsiri 52', 90+3'	Stadium: Stadium of Kasetsart University, Kamphaeng Saen Campus; Attendance: 550; Referee: Phadoongkiat Piangdee; Assistant referees: Siwat Chaithong, Chaiyos Sripak; Fourth official: U-sen Yala

2 November 2022	Chattrakan City (TA)	0–0 (a.e.t.) (5–6 p)	Assawin Kohkwang United (T3)	Mueang, Phitsanulok
15:00 (UTC+7)		Report		Stadium: Stadium of Pibulsongkram Rajabhat University; Referee: Nattawut Pornchaiwirun; Assistant referees: Suttinan Kanchana, Chaiwat Mukda; Fourth official: Tanyathon Phetch-udom
	Penalties
	Nakun Pinthong (penalty scored); Jetsada Thapphueng (penalty scored); Pathomphon Phutson (penalty scored); Banjoed Chueabunmee (penalty missed); Supaphorn Prompinit (penalty scored); Wirat Nakpan (penalty missed); Jaturong Aiyarakhom (penalty scored); Natthapol Thongdonpum (penalty missed)		(penalty scored) Sarawut Atthasit; (penalty missed) Chanwit Klungmanee; (penalty scored) Khwanchai Khuanam; (penalty scored) Kongdech Bornay; (penalty scored) Sahaphat Sarnnok; (penalty missed) Krittanai Pulunram; (penalty scored) Surasak Asurin; (penalty scored) Teetawat Chaiya

2 November 2022	FC Bangsaothong (TA)	0–4	Uthai Thani (T2)	Bang Sao Thong, Samut Prakan
15:00 (UTC+7)		Report	Carlos Damian dos Santos Puentes 14'; Nawamin Chaiprasert 66'; Kento Nagasaki 75'; Piyaruck Kwangkaew 82'	Stadium: Samut Prakan Stadium; Attendance: 135; Referee: Wichate Tainthong; Assistant referees: Sarayut Sriampri, Kittinan Sotorphrphakorn; Fourth official: Ekkachai Phetcham

2 November 2022	Roi Et PB United (TA)	1–2	Surin Khong Chee Mool (T3)	Mueang, Roiet
15:00 (UTC+7)	Thongchai Rathchai 81'	Report	Chayapon Udornpan 33'; Tirawut Thiwato 90'	Stadium: Roiet Provincial Stadium; Attendance: 54; Referee: Anan Amatsobat; Assistant referees: Sutiwat Kaewkhunthong, Worawut Chatipa; Fourth official: Sarawut Dassada

2 November 2022	Jalor City (T3)	0–3	Rajpracha (T2)	Mueang, Yala
15:00 (UTC+7)		Report	Somyot Pongsuwan 20'; Ibrahim Konaré 30'; Mohamed Aly Sidibé 64'	Stadium: Yala Municipality Stadium; Attendance: 1,200; Referee: Kristin Saisombat; Assistant referees: Khomchalach Lekhawijit, Watcharasak Intharak; Fourth official: Boonsong Prachumrak

2 November 2022	Amnat Charoen City (TA)	4–2	Navy (T3)	Mueang, Amnat Charoen
15:00 (UTC+7)	Thanaphon Wangsin 14'; Taweesak Detphon 67'; Anucha Phasupho 74'; Chaowanat In-ard 88' (pen.)	Report	Wutthinan Thaweerathitsakul 12'; Pongpan Parapan 75'	Stadium: Amnat Charoen Municipality Stadium; Attendance: 550; Referee: Chaisiri Sonnam; Assistant referees: Surachai Thongudom, Kroekkiad Laosing; Fourth official: Warakorn Suraporn

2 November 2022	Chanthaburi (T3)	1–4	Chiangrai United (T1)	Mueang, Chanthaburi
15:00 (UTC+7)	Charin Boodhad 89'	Report; Highlight	Olávio dos Santos Lima Filho 15', 60'; Akarawin Sawasdee 34'; Chotipat Poomkaew 42'	Stadium: Chanthaburi Provincial Stadium; Attendance: 568; Referee: Peeratat Kittikanmetee; Assistant referees: Rachain Srichai, Kantrakorn Ngaosri; Fourth official: Pongthep Raipimai

2 November 2022	Udon United (T3)	1–4	Nongbua Pitchaya (T1)	Mueang, Udon Thani
15:00 (UTC+7)	Pattaraburin Jannawan 5'	Report	Tanapat Waempracha 11'; Marlon de Jesús 21' (pen.), 69'; Chatri Rattanawong 63'	Stadium: Stadium of Thailand National Sports University, Udon Thani Campus; Referee: Noppadet Mangngam; Assistant referees: Apichit Nophuan, Chaiya Sripak; Fourth official: Tawatchai Ngampod

2 November 2022	Wat Bot City (T3)	2–1	Kanchanaburi City (T3)	Wat Bot, Phitsanulok
15:00 (UTC+7)	Saran Tadtiang 9'; Jose Magson Bezerra Dourado 58'	Report	Thanasak Chanmani 60'	Stadium: H2H Sport Stadium; Attendance: 49; Referee: Chalit Ploypech; Assistant referees: Tulakan Khamthai, Pratanrat Chaina; Fourth official: Jackkrit Meekru

2 November 2022	Khon Kaen (T3)	1–1 (a.e.t.) (4–3 p)	Banbueng (T3)	Mueang, Khon Kaen
15:00 (UTC+7)	Punyachotc Namjatturat 36'	Report	Thanakorn Waiyawut 90+5'	Stadium: Stadium of Khon Kaen University; Attendance: 228; Referee: Chalermpon Thongsri; Assistant referees: Saengsuree Pochana, Chanatip Meechai; Fourth official: Anan Keawmuangkhun
	Penalties
	Sahatsawat Arsachana (penalty scored); Chontrakarn Srikull (penalty scored); Taweesak Chanlee (penalty missed); Cholakran Chueaprasat (penalty scored); Chinnawat Phophat (penalty scored)		(penalty missed) Nicranas Wonganusat; (penalty scored) Vivat Sugsabay; (penalty missed) Anuson Thaloengram; (penalty scored) Suppanyoo Hernmek; (penalty scored) Nuttapong Deeduaychat

2 November 2022	Saimit Kabin United (T3)	2–0	Nakhon Ratchasima United (T3)	Kabin Buri, Prachinburi
15:00 (UTC+7)	Thanaphong Jenvitchuwong 13'; Wutthinan Boonkong 62'	Report		Stadium: Nomklao Maharat Stadium; Attendance: 48; Referee: Niruch Panjontuk; Assistant referees: Siravich Konngam, Narit Mungtoemklang; Fourth official: Theerapon Nakthong

2 November 2022	Prachinburi City (TA)	4–2	Krabi (T2)	Mueang, Prachinburi
15:00 (UTC+7)	Taiphob Suriya 11'; Abdulkordiri Hamid 44'; Phatthanaphong Phekasut 71', 80' (pen.)	Report	Rattasart Makasoot 43'; Phanthawat Hatdonla 90+5'	Stadium: Prachinburi Provincial Stadium; Attendance: 227; Referee: Prakasit Chantarasawang; Assistant referees: Narong Hansuk, Anupong Sangtopo; Fourth official: Amnat Makklang

2 November 2022	Sisaket United (T3)	3–0	Futera United (TA)	Mueang, Sisaket
17:00 (UTC+7)	Kritsada Utamakun 51'; Baphit Chooklin 54'; Thaweekun Thong-on 63'	Report		Stadium: Sri Nakhon Lamduan Stadium; Referee: Yodsakorn Pakdeesuwan; Assistant referees: Rutratchapoom Moolpong, Weerasak Dookkhumnoom; Fourth official: Watcharachat Loumpool

2 November 2022	Songkhla (T3)	2–3	Suphanburi (T2)	Mueang, Songkhla
17:00 (UTC+7)	Patiphol Thosaeng 42' (o.g.); Jardel 89' (pen.)	Report; Highlight	Phiraphat Khamphaeng 2'; Matheus Souza e Silva 90+1'; Sorravid Sookbanthoeng 90+6'	Stadium: Tinsulanon Stadium; Attendance: 1,731; Referee: Peerasan Krataithong; Assistant referees: Phariwat Phoyoo, Jareon Nunboon; Fourth official: Sapuding Kalong

2 November 2022	Dome (TA)	2–2 (a.e.t.) (1–3 p)	Chiangrai (TA)	Khlong Luang, Pathum Thani
18:00 (UTC+7)	Phongpisut Yingyong 51' (pen.); Wuthichai Nualloi 115'	Report	Kiattisak Rotwan 86'; Pijit Chopsaran 93'	Stadium: Thammasat Stadium; Referee: Trin Sahachaipat; Assistant referees: Suthipong Teekhasuk, Jakkaphan Rinsarn; Fourth official: Pichit Thongjanmoon
	Penalties
	Krittapot Kongla (penalty missed); Wuthichai Nualloi (penalty scored); Phanawat Limwanasthian (penalty missed); Sangsan Jiamjan (penalty missed)		(penalty missed) Thanadol Dumponngam; (penalty scored) Apichit Jaipan; (penalty scored) Warakorn Khanchum; (penalty scored) Jittarin Luangchai

2 November 2022	Chiangmai (T2)	1–3	Bangkok United (T1)	Mueang, Chiangmai
18:00 (UTC+7)	Tawan Khotrsupho 24'	Report; Highlight	Willen 5'; Ratchanat Arunyapairot 28', 78'	Stadium: Chiangmai Municipality Stadium; Attendance: 849; Referee: Sarayut Jakngoen; Assistant referees: Chotrawee Tongduang, Waranyoo Chomgoson; Fourth official: Direk Kaort

2 November 2022	Lampang (T1)	3–1	See Khwae City (T3)	Mueang, Lampang
18:00 (UTC+7)	Poltawat Janntasree 15'; Thaned Benyapad 34' (pen.); Mosquito 90+1'	Report	Pongsakorn Poonsamrit 66'	Stadium: Lampang Provincial Stadium; Attendance: 267; Referee: Paisan Bendem-alee; Assistant referees: Pattarapong Kijsathit, Srisuwan Boonnum; Fourth official: Ketdumrong Khemthong

2 November 2022	Ghost Gate (TA)	0–5	Prime Bangkok (T3)	Doi Saket, Chiangmai
18:00 (UTC+7)		Report	Tishan Hanley 30', 77'; Achraf Tantaoui 39', 82'; Aekkaphong Phlmankasemsri 74'	Stadium: Stadium of Rajamangala University of Technology Lanna, Doi Saket Campus; Attendance: 313; Referee: Sarawut Tawiya; Assistant referees: Jarin Champakpriew, Tudsanee Khuanpet; Fourth official: Doungkaew Doungtawan

2 November 2022	Port (T1)	3–0	Sukhothai (T1)	Khlong Toei, Bangkok
18:00 (UTC+7)	Teerasak Poeiphimai 45+3', 90+3'; Hamilton 66'	Report; Highlight		Stadium: PAT Stadium; Attendance: 2,654; Referee: Sivakorn Pu-udom; Assistant referees: Suriya Lee-intr, Tuwae-yusoh Kuji; Fourth official: Veeraporn Maophaeo

2 November 2022	Police Tero (T1)	2–0	Customs United (T2)	Lak Si, Bangkok
18:00 (UTC+7)	Denis Darbellay 5'; Chalermsak Aukkee 90+4'	Report		Stadium: Boonyachinda Stadium; Referee: Niwat Insa-ard; Assistant referees: Kasama Loyma, Banpot Khunhong; Fourth official: Chaikrit Inboonsong

2 November 2022	Chiangmai United (T2)	2–1 (a.e.t.)	Kasetsart (T2)	Mae Rim, Chiangmai
18:00 (UTC+7)	Anuson Jaipet 72' (o.g.); Evson Patrício 104'	Report	Evson Patrício 39' (o.g.)	Stadium: 700th Anniversary of Chiangmai Stadium; Attendance: 211; Referee: Poowasak Sukunt; Assistant referees: Songrit Trakulchai, Thanet Jairaw; Fourth official: Wirot Oupachit

2 November 2022	Ratchaburi (T1)	4–1	Warin Chamrap (TA)	Mueang, Ratchaburi
18:00 (UTC+7)	Thanaphat Kamjhonkiadtikun 17'; Thanaset Sujarit 41'; Kasidech Wettayawong 65'; Douglas Rodrigues 89'	Report	Pattarapon Chuenchon 52'	Stadium: Dragon Solar Park; Attendance: 364; Referee: Akom Charoensuk; Assistant referees: Chaowalit Poonprasit, Narin Wongprapipak; Fourth official: Pawara Seejen

2 November 2022	Nakhon Pathom United (T2)	2–1	Chonburi (T1)	Mueang, Nakhon Pathom
18:00 (UTC+7)	Mohamed Essam 15'; Anukorn Sangrum 90+5'	Report; Highlight	Yoo Byung-soo 62'	Stadium: Stadium of Nakhon Pathom Municipality Sports School; Attendance: 1,625; Referee: Winat Phophat; Assistant referees: Natthaphon Mala, Sadsampan Kunsakoo; Fourth official: Komgrit Ponpasit

2 November 2022	Phrae United (T2)	2–0	Kamphaengphet (T3)	Mueang, Phrae
18:00 (UTC+7)	Rodrigo Maranhão 56'; Decha Moohummard 65'	Report		Stadium: Huai Ma Stadium; Attendance: 275; Referee: Piyapong Thongkhain; Assistant referees: Sahatnet Deemongkol, Kattiya Saphu; Fourth official: Wathanyu Morin

2 November 2022	PT Prachuap (T1)	7–1	Khelang United (TA)	Mueang, Prachuap Khiri Khan
18:00 (UTC+7)	Sirom Gardsrinich 16' (o.g.); Apichart Denman 23'; Nattapon Malapun 60', 69'; Samuel 66', 77'; Thirayu Banhan 90+2'	Report	Mathas Kajaree 40'	Stadium: Sam Ao Stadium; Referee: Anusorn Nookaew; Assistant referees: Vichet Getkaew, Yossapon Tongprom; Fourth official: Alongkorn Khonwai

2 November 2022	Phitsanulok (T3)	5–3	Samut Sakhon City (T3)	Mueang, Phitsanulok
18:00 (UTC+7)	Harinut Weerakijphanich 36'; Arthit Sunthornpit 60'; Sarayut Kongkool 65' (o.g.); Mairon Natan Pereira Maciel Oliveira 70'; Nuttawut Chanachan 86'	Report	Piyadanai Prasert 34'; Wuttichat Yiamming 89', 90+1'	Stadium: Phitsanulok PAO. Stadium; Attendance: 574; Referee: Suphanat Yainta; Assistant referees: Phattharaphon Chaknam-arng, Suwit Kongtongnok; Fourth official: Supat Chaingam

2 November 2022	Nakhon Ratchasima Mazda (T1)	10–0	Samut Songkhram (T3)	Mueang, Nakhon Ratchasima
18:00 (UTC+7)	Oliver Granberg 13', 89'; Nattachai Srisuwan 30', 42', 54' (pen.); Siroch Chatthong 51', 87'; Morgan Ferrier 69', 85'; Patcharapol Intanee 70'	Report		Stadium: His Majesty the King's 80th Birthday Anniversary Stadium; Attendance: 893; Referee: Songkran Bunmeekiart; Assistant referees: Sumate Peasiri, Kriangsak Pimsanit; Fourth official: Somkhid Sarapim

2 November 2022	Chainat Hornbill (T2)	4–0	Ayothaya Warrior (TA)	Mueang, Chai Nat
18:00 (UTC+7)	Dennis Nieblas 45+1', 49'; Thiraphong Yangdi 64'; Sarayut Yoosuebchuea 82'	Report		Stadium: Khao Plong Stadium; Attendance: 398; Referee: Manut Pimol; Assistant referees: Nissan Janthep, Nattapong Wadweangcom; Fourth official: Natthwut Nammuang

2 November 2022	BG Pathum United (T1)	3–0	Kasem Bundit University (T3)	Thanyaburi, Pathum Thani
19:00 (UTC+7)	Ikhsan Fandi 13', 69'; Jakkapan Praisuwan 66'	Report; Highlight		Stadium: BG Stadium; Attendance: 2,846; Referee: Thapakorn Thongkon; Assistant referees: Phubes Lekpha, Kittipon Meeporn; Fourth official: Suriyo Kanhachalee

2 November 2022	Buriram United (T1)	5–1	Samut Prakan City (T2)	Mueang, Buriram
19:00 (UTC+7)	Jonathan Bolingi 3'; Ayub Masika 40'; Arthit Boodjinda 42'; Frank Castañeda 59'; Sasalak Haiprakhon 90+3'	Report; Highlight	Petru Leucă 77'	Stadium: Chang Arena; Attendance: 12,290; Referee: Chaireag Ngam-som; Assistant referees: Worapong Prasartsri, Rachan Dawangpa; Fourth official: Chaiya Moolmanee

2 November 2022	Khon Kaen United (T1)	0–3	Lamphun Warriors (T1)	Mueang, Khon Kaen
19:00 (UTC+7)		Report	Iain Ramsay 25'; Chaiyawat Buran 76'; Santipap Ratniyorm 87'	Stadium: Khon Kaen PAO. Stadium; Attendance: 1,022; Referee: Natee Choosuwan; Assistant referees: Tanin Reunjit, Anucha Pinamon; Fourth official: Krisda Luangyos

=== Third round ===
The third round would be featured 32 clubs that were the winners of the second round including 13 clubs from T1, 8 clubs from T2, 8 clubs from T3, and 3 clubs from TA. This round had drawn on 8 November 2022. 71 goals occurred in this round.

30 November 2022	Wat Bot City (T3)	0–1	Uthai Thani (T2)	Wat Bot, Phitsanulok
15:00 (UTC+7)		Report	Adefolarin Durosinmi 72'	Stadium: H2H Sport Stadium; Attendance: 100; Referee: Samrit Ritkaew; Assistant referees: Khomchalach Lekhawijit, Nattapong Wadweangcom; Fourth official: Direk Kaort

30 November 2022	Surin Khong Chee Mool (T3)	0–4	Nakhon Ratchasima Mazda (T1)	Mueang, Surin
15:00 (UTC+7)		Report	Charlie Clough 17'; Jaturapat Sattham 30'; Oliver Granberg 54'; Rittiporn Wanchuen 56'	Stadium: Stadium of Rajamangala University of Technology Isan, Surin Campus; Attendance: 152; Referee: Winat Phophat; Assistant referees: Chotrawee Tongduang, Suriya Lee-intr; Fourth official: Chaiya Moolmanee

30 November 2022	Chainat Hornbill (T2)	1–4	Bangkok United (T1)	Mueang, Chai Nat
17:00 (UTC+7)	Patipanchai Phothep 79'	Report	Heberty 48' (pen.); Willen 51', 90+3'; Rungrath Poomchantuek 60'	Stadium: Khao Plong Stadium; Attendance: 602; Referee: Chaireag Ngam-som; Assistant referees: Worapong Prasartsri, Poonsawat Samransuk; Fourth official: Wirot Oupachit

30 November 2022	Police Tero (T1)	1–0	Saimit Kabin United (T3)	Lak Si, Bangkok
17:00 (UTC+7)	Janepob Phokhi 90+6'	Report		Stadium: Boonyachinda Stadium; Attendance: 357; Referee: Warintron Sassadee; Assistant referees: Komsan Kampan, Rachain Srichai; Fourth official: Komgrit Ponpasit

30 November 2022	Sisaket United (T3)	10–0	Chiangrai (TA)	Mueang, Sisaket
17:00 (UTC+7)	Romário Reginaldo Alves 9'; Osvaldo Nascimento dos Santos Neto 32', 53'; Suphaphon Sutthisak 65', 83'; Baphit Chooklin 71'; Watchara Chanthai 80', 87', 88'; Witthaya Kantong 90'	Report		Stadium: Sri Nakhon Lamduan Stadium; Attendance: 359; Referee: Pongdanai Sadsadee; Assistant referees: Waratchanon Chombun, Chanatip Meechai; Fourth official: Pisal Motongsri

30 November 2022	Suphanburi (T2)	3–2	Rajpracha (T2)	Mueang, Suphanburi
17:30 (UTC+7)	Seiya Kojima 26'; Peeranat Jantawong 62'; Douglas Tardin 64'	Report; Highlight	Ibrahim Konaré 47'; Chutipan Nopnob 58'	Stadium: Suphanburi Provincial Stadium; Attendance: 620; Referee: Pongthep Raipimai; Assistant referees: Nissan Janthep, Pakorn Srichumsin; Fourth official: Chaikrit Inboonsong

30 November 2022	Buriram United (T1)	2–0	Nakhon Pathom United (T2)	Mueang, Buriram
18:00 (UTC+7)	Suphanat Mueanta 36'; Frank Castañeda 65'	Report; Highlight		Stadium: Chang Arena; Attendance: 15,295; Referee: Phairot Bunkamnoed; Assistant referees: Apichit Nophuan, Chaowalit Poonprasit; Fourth official: Paisan Bendem-alee

30 November 2022	Phrae United (T2)	3–2	Khon Kaen (T3)	Mueang, Phrae
18:00 (UTC+7)	Taku Ito 11', 35'; Tanadol Chaipa 75'	Report	Waradorn Unart 9' (o.g.); Punyachotc Namjatturat 21'	Stadium: Huai Ma Stadium; Attendance: 247; Referee: Kristin Saisombat; Assistant referees: Anucha Pinamon, Kantrakorn Ngaosri; Fourth official: Wathanyu Morin

30 November 2022	Nongbua Pitchaya (T1)	2–2 (a.e.t.) (2–4 p)	Prime Bangkok (T3)	Mueang, Nongbua Lamphu
18:00 (UTC+7)	Barros Tardeli 55', 90+4' (pen.)	Report	Tishan Hanley 67'; Chawanwit Saelao 90+5'	Stadium: Pitchaya Stadium; Attendance: 1,288; Referee: Kotchapoom Meesridaecha; Assistant referees: Rachan Dawangpa, Chaiya Sripak; Fourth official: Peerasan Krataithong
	Penalties
	Barros Tardeli (penalty scored); Chatri Rattanawong (penalty missed); Islam Batran (penalty missed); Nuttawut Khamrin (penalty scored)		(penalty scored) Mohamed Imam Ali Mohamed; (penalty scored) Watcharapong Nuangprakaew; (penalty scored) Sirisak Promduang; (penalty scored) Abdulrahman Kelani Essadi

30 November 2022	Phitsanulok (T3)	7–2	Amnat Charoen City (TA)	Mueang, Phitsanulok
18:00 (UTC+7)	Gilberto Macena 14'; Nuttawut Chanachan 32'; Mairon Natan Pereira Maciel Oliveira 37', 39'; Harinut Weerakijphanich 64'; Nutchanon Khaowsaard 82'; Arthit Sunthornpit 85'	Report	Chaowanat In-ard 27'; Sittisak Nimma 45+2'	Stadium: Phitsanulok PAO. Stadium; Attendance: 844; Referee: Suphanat Yainta; Assistant referees: Suttinan Kanchana, Saksit Jantain; Fourth official: Supat Chaingam

30 November 2022	Port (T1)	3–0	Ayutthaya United (T2)	Khlong Toei, Bangkok
18:30 (UTC+7)	Sergio Suárez 21'; Negueba 38'; Teerasak Poeiphimai 65'	Report; Highlight		Stadium: PAT Stadium; Attendance: 2,275; Referee: Songkran Bunmeekiart; Assistant referees: Rawut Nakarit, Srisuwan Boonnum; Fourth official: Akom Charoensuk

30 November 2022	Ratchaburi (T1)	1–2 (a.e.t.)	Chiangrai United (T1)	Mueang, Ratchaburi
18:30 (UTC+7)	Derley 28' (pen.)	Report; Highlight	Kim Ji-min 39', 91'	Stadium: Dragon Solar Park; Attendance: 1,203; Referee: Sivakorn Pu-udom; Assistant referees: Tanate Chuchuen, Pattarapong Kijsathit; Fourth official: Anusorn Nookaew

30 November 2022	Chiangmai United (T2)	4–1	Prachinburi City (TA)	Mae Rim, Chiangmai
19:00 (UTC+7)	Nantawat Suankaew 36'; Evson Patrício 75'; Bill 84'; Melvin de Leeuw 90+1'	Report	Abdulkordiri Hamid 4'	Stadium: 700th Anniversary of Chiangmai Stadium; Attendance: 397; Referee: Satchukorn Saenchu; Assistant referees: Songrit Trakulchai, Hanyot Buangrab; Fourth official: U-sen Yala

30 November 2022	Muangthong United (T1)	3–0	Assawin Kohkwang United (T3)	Pak Kret, Nonthaburi
19:00 (UTC+7)	Henri Anier 32'; Ekanit Panya 59'; Wongsakorn Chaikultewin 68'	Report; Highlight		Stadium: Thunderdome Stadium; Attendance: 748; Referee: Mongkolchai Pechsri; Assistant referees: Natthaphon Mala, Tuwae-yusoh Kuji; Fourth official: Vitsavet Sangnakorn

30 November 2022	BG Pathum United (T1)	7–1	Lampang (T1)	Thanyaburi, Pathum Thani
19:00 (UTC+7)	Teerasil Dangda 22', 60'; Cássio Scheid 50'; Ikhsan Fandi 52', 57'; Pathompol Charoenrattanapirom 82', 84'	Report; Highlight	Andrey Coutinho 71' (pen.)	Stadium: BG Stadium; Attendance: 3,016; Referee: Natee Choosuwan; Assistant referees: Vichet Getkaew, Ruangsak Nupuak; Fourth official: Suriyo Kanhachalee

1 December 2022	Lamphun Warriors (T1)	2–1	PT Prachuap (T1)	Mae Rim, Chiangmai
17:00 (UTC+7)	Anan Yodsangwal 80'; Ognjen Mudrinski 90+3'	Report; Highlight	Samuel 10'	Stadium: 700th Anniversary of Chiangmai Stadium; Attendance: 131; Referee: Noppadet Mangngam; Assistant referees: Tanin Reunjit, Binla Preeda; Fourth official: Sarayut Jakngoen

=== Fourth round ===
The fourth round would be featured 16 clubs that were the winners of the third round including 9 clubs from T1, 4 clubs from T2, and 3 clubs from T3. This round had drawn on 18 January 2023. 23 goals occurred in this round.

8 February 2023	Police Tero (T1)	1–1 (a.e.t.) (6–5 p)	Sisaket United (T3)	Lak Si, Bangkok
17:00 (UTC+7)	Lesley Adjei Ablorh 9'	Report; Highlight	Osvaldo Nascimento dos Santos Neto 81'	Stadium: Boonyachinda Stadium; Attendance: 789; Referee: Mongkolchai Pechsri; Assistant referees: Tanate Chuchuen, Narin Wongprapipak; Fourth official: Wicharn Klinthaworn
	Penalties
	Isaac Honny (penalty scored); Chalermsak Aukkee (penalty missed); Ekkachai Sumrei (penalty scored); Peerapat Kaminthong (penalty scored); Pongsakon Srevaurai (penalty scored); Witthaya Moonwong (penalty scored); Nattawut Munsuwan (penalty scored)		(penalty missed) Osvaldo Nascimento dos Santos Neto; (penalty scored) Romário Reginaldo Alves; (penalty scored) Nirun Chaokhao; (penalty scored) Nitipat Kansorn; (penalty scored) Thaweekun Thong-on; (penalty scored) Thankon Sawangphop; (penalty missed) Kantaphong Chanthaworn

8 February 2023	Phrae United (T2)	2–1 (a.e.t.)	Prime Bangkok (T3)	Mueang, Phrae
17:00 (UTC+7)	Marlon Henrique Brandão da Silva 80', 103'	Report; Highlight	Chawanwit Saelao 68'	Stadium: Huai Ma Stadium; Attendance: 253; Referee: Thapakorn Thongkon; Assistant referees: Waranyoo Chomgoson, Wirot Lokham; Fourth official: Panumas Phansamo

8 February 2023	Phitsanulok (T3)	1–2 (a.e.t.)	Bangkok United (T1)	Mueang, Phitsanulok
18:00 (UTC+7)	Gilberto Macena 75'	Report; Highlight	Manuel Bihr 56'; Vander 116'	Stadium: Phitsanulok PAO. Stadium; Attendance: 916; Referee: Natee Choosuwan; Assistant referees: Binla Preeda, Suriya Lee-intr; Fourth official: Chaireag Ngam-som

8 February 2023	BG Pathum United (T1)	1–0	Lamphun Warriors (T1)	Thanyaburi, Pathum Thani
18:00 (UTC+7)	Teerasil Dangda 19'	Report; Highlight		Stadium: BG Stadium; Attendance: 3,226; Referee: Vitsavet Sangnakorn; Assistant referees: Apichit Nophuan, Rawut Nakarit; Fourth official: Suriyo Kanhachalee

8 February 2023	Chiangrai United (T1)	1–0 (a.e.t.)	Muangthong United (T1)	Mueang, Chiangrai
18:00 (UTC+7)	Felipe Amorim 101'	Report; Highlight		Stadium: Leo Chiangrai Stadium; Attendance: 1,972; Referee: Sivakorn Pu-udom; Assistant referees: Chotrawee Tongduang, Natthaphon Mala; Fourth official: Kristin Saisombat

8 February 2023	Nakhon Ratchasima Mazda (T1)	5–1	Suphanburi (T2)	Mueang, Nakhon Ratchasima
19:00 (UTC+7)	Jordan Murray 7' (pen.), 12' (pen.); Charlie Clough 58'; Crislan 69', 72'	Report; Highlight	João Paulo 22'	Stadium: His Majesty the King's 80th Birthday Anniversary Stadium; Attendance: 1,694; Referee: Songkran Bunmeekiart; Assistant referees: Poonsawat Samransuk, Tuwae-yusoh Kuji; Fourth official: Kotchapoom Meesridaecha

8 February 2023	Uthai Thani (T2)	1–2 (a.e.t.)	Buriram United (T1)	Mueang, Uthai Thani
19:00 (UTC+7)	Steeven Langil 65'	Report; Highlight	Lonsana Doumbouya 45+2', 119' (pen.)	Stadium: Uthai Thani Provincial Stadium; Attendance: 4,076; Referee: Sarayut Jakngoen; Assistant referees: Worapong Prasartsri, Chaowalit Poonprasit; Fourth official: Samrit Ritkaew

8 February 2023	Port (T1)	4–0	Chiangmai United (T2)	Khlong Toei, Bangkok
19:00 (UTC+7)	Suphanan Bureerat 20'; Elias Dolah 60'; Bordin Phala 76'; Worachit Kanitsribampen 89'	Report; Highlight		Stadium: PAT Stadium; Attendance: 2,593; Referee: Wiwat Jumpaoon; Assistant referees: Pattarapong Kijsathit, Vichet Getkaew; Fourth official: Sila Jinnigorn

=== Quarter-finals ===
The quarter-finals would be featured 8 clubs that were the winners of the fourth round including 7 clubs from T1 and 1 club from T2. This round had drawn on 15 February 2023. 12 goals occurred in this round.

1 March 2023	Bangkok United (T1)	1–0	Nakhon Ratchasima Mazda (T1)	Khlong Luang, Pathum Thani
17:30 (UTC+7)	Wasan Homsan 68' (o.g.)	Report; Highlight		Stadium: Thammasat Stadium; Attendance: 1,071; Referee: Mongkolchai Pechsri; Assistant referees: Pattarapong Kijsathit, Rawut Nakarit; Fourth official: Paisan Bendem-alee

1 March 2023	BG Pathum United (T1)	1–2	Police Tero (T1)	Thanyaburi, Pathum Thani
18:00 (UTC+7)	Teerasil Dangda 7'	Report; Highlight	Jakkapan Praisuwan 47' (o.g.); Chanukun Karin 73'	Stadium: BG Stadium; Attendance: 3,409; Referee: Sivakorn Pu-udom; Assistant referees: Apichit Nophuan, Suriya Lee-intr; Fourth official: Noppadet Mangngam

1 March 2023	Port (T1)	1–0	Chiangrai United (T1)	Khlong Toei, Bangkok
18:30 (UTC+7)	Negueba 82'	Report; Highlight		Stadium: PAT Stadium; Attendance: 4,191; Referee: Songkran Bunmeekiart; Assistant referees: Tanate Chuchuen, Worapong Prasartsri; Fourth official: Phairot Bunkamnoed

1 March 2023	Buriram United (T1)	5–2	Phrae United (T2)	Mueang, Buriram
19:00 (UTC+7)	Goran Čaušić 2' (pen.); Supachai Chaided 9', 27'; Haris Vučkić 45', 76'	Report; Highlight	Apiwit Samurmuen 5'; Ratthanakorn Maikami 65' (o.g.)	Stadium: Chang Arena; Attendance: 17,177; Referee: Wiwat Jumpaoon; Assistant referees: Rachain Srichai, Rachan Dawangpa; Fourth official: Kristin Saisombat

=== Semi-finals ===
The semi-finals would be featured 4 clubs that were the winners of the quarter-finals, all are clubs from T1. This round had drawn on 23 March 2023. 6 goals occurred in this round.

19 April 2023	Police Tero (T1)	0–4	Bangkok United (T1)	Mueang, Suphanburi
18:00 (UTC+7)		Report; Highlight	Thitiphan Puangchan 13'; Willen 73', 84'; Mahmoud Eid 79'	Stadium: Suphanburi Provincial Stadium; Attendance: 1,218; Referee: Songkran Bunmeekiart; Assistant referees: Komsan Kampan, Poonsawat Samransuk; Fourth official: Natee Choosuwan

19 April 2023	Buriram United (T1)	2–0	Port (T1)	Mueang, Ratchaburi
19:00 (UTC+7)	Suphanat Mueanta 60'; Airton 76' (o.g.)	Report; Highlight		Stadium: Dragon Solar Park; Attendance: 6,452; Referee: Sarayut Jakngoen; Assistant referees: Pattarapong Kijsathit, Chotrawee Tongduang; Fourth official: Anusorn Nookaew

=== Final ===
The final would be featured 2 clubs that were the winners of the semi-finals, both are clubs from T1. 2 goal occurred in this round.

28 May 2023	Bangkok United (T1)	0–2	Buriram United (T1)	Khlong Luang, Pathum Thani
18:00 (UTC+7)		Report; Highlight; Full match Ceremony	Jonathan Bolingi 18', 45+3'	Stadium: Thammasat Stadium; Attendance: 14,091; Referee: Wiwat Jumpaoon; Assistant referees: Tanate Chuchuen, Chotrawee Tongduang; Fourth official: Natee Choosuwan

== Tournament statistics ==
=== Top goalscorers ===
Rank	Player	Club	Goals
1	(Thailand) Tanet Saengthong	Ayothaya Warrior	6
1	(Mali) Ibrahim Konaré	Rajpracha	6
3	(Thailand) Danuson Wijitpunya	Ayutthaya United	5
3	(Brazil) Willen	Bangkok United	5
3	(Thailand) Jakkit Niyomsuk	Nakhon Si United	5
3	(Thailand) Chawanwit Saelao	Prime Bangkok	5
7	(Thailand) Manuchet Wansa	AES Moonlight	4
7	(Singapore) Ikhsan Fandi	BG Pathum United	4
7	(Thailand) Teerasil Dangda	BG Pathum United	4
7	(Thailand) Pathomphon Phutson	Chattrakan City	4
7	(Thailand) Thammathon Narikham	FC Hallelujah	4
7	(Thailand) Wuttichat Yiamming	Samut Sakhon City	4
7	(Thailand) Phiraphat Khamphaeng	Suphanburi	4

=== Hat-tricks ===
Player	For	Against	Result	Date	Round
(Thailand) Dhanabodee Thongtong	Vachiralai United (TA)	Namphong United (TA)	11–0 (A)	28 September 2022	Qualification round
(Thailand) Tanet Saengthong	Ayothaya Warrior (TA)	Kasetsart Academy (TA)	6–1 (A)	28 September 2022	Qualification round
(Thailand) Manuchet Wansa^{4}	AES Moonlight (TA)	TK Academy (TA)	6–2 (H)	28 September 2022	Qualification round
(Thailand) Jattuphon Nueakaew	Surin City (T3)	Thonburi Forest (TA)	5–0 (H)	28 September 2022	Qualification round
(Thailand) Thammathon Narikham^{4}	FC Hallelujah (TA)	Donmueng (TA)	6–3 (A)	28 September 2022	Qualification round
(Thailand) Decha Muhammad	Phrae United (T2)	Wang Noi City (TA)	6–0 (H)	28 September 2022	Qualification round
(Thailand) Jakkit Niyomsuk^{5}	Nakhon Si United (T2)	Khunhan United (TA)	12–0 (H)	28 September 2022	Qualification round
(Thailand) Pathomphon Phutson^{4}	Chattrakan City (TA)	Siam (T3)	4–1 (H)	5 October 2022	First round
(Thailand) Phatsakon Fukfang	Futera United (TA)	The Zero (TA)	5–1 (A)	5 October 2022	First round
(Thailand) Sakeereen Teekasom	Jalor City (T3)	Huasamrong Gateway (TA)	6–0 (H)	5 October 2022	First round
(Thailand) Tanet Saengthong	Ayothaya Warrior (TA)	AES Moonlight (TA)	5–0 (H)	5 October 2022	First round
(Thailand) Phatsakorn Srikaewnin	FC Bangsaothong (TA)	Teerachaipallet Samut Prakan (TA)	6–1 (A)	5 October 2022	First round
(Mali) Ibrahim Konaré^{4}	Rajpracha (T2)	Phrae (TA)	6–0 (H)	5 October 2022	First round
(Thailand) Phiraphat Khamphaeng	Suphanburi (T2)	UD Vessuwan (TA)	11–1 (H)	5 October 2022	First round
(Thailand) Danuson Wijitpunya	Ayutthaya United (T2)	Nakhon Ratchasima College (TA)	6–0 (H)	5 October 2022	First round
(Thailand) Nattachai Srisuwan	Nakhon Ratchasima Mazda (T1)	Samut Songkhram (T3)	10–0 (H)	2 November 2022	Second round
(Thailand) Watchara Chanthai	Sisaket United (T3)	Chiangrai (TA)	10–0 (H)	30 November 2022	Third round

Notes: ^{5} = Player scored 5 goals; ^{4} = Player scored 4 goals; (H) = Home team; (A) = Away team

== See also ==
- 2022–23 Thai League 1
- 2022–23 Thai League 2
- 2022–23 Thai League 3
- 2022–23 Thai League 3 Northern Region
- 2022–23 Thai League 3 Northeastern Region
- 2022–23 Thai League 3 Eastern Region
- 2022–23 Thai League 3 Western Region
- 2022–23 Thai League 3 Southern Region
- 2022–23 Thai League 3 Bangkok Metropolitan Region
- 2022–23 Thai League 3 National Championship
- 2022–23 Thai League Cup
- 2022 Thailand Champions Cup
