= Chawanwat Srisook =

Thai footballer (born 1990)

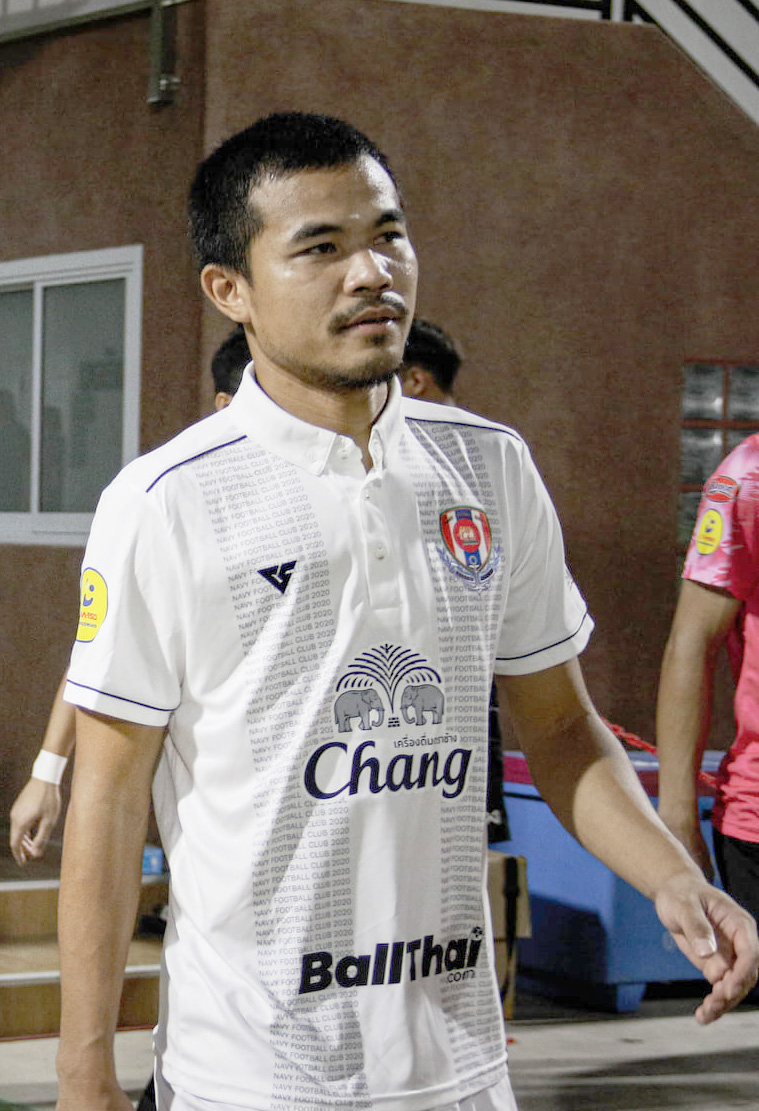
- Chawanwat Srisook playing for Navy.

Personal information
- Full name: Chawanwat Srisook
- Date of birth: 11 February 1990 (age 36)
- Place of birth: Thailand
- Position: Right midfielder

Senior career*
Years	Team	Apps	(Gls)
2015–2022	Navy	148	(10)
2022–2024	ACDC	0	(0)
- * Club domestic league appearances and goals

Chawanwat Srisook (Thai: ชวัลวัฒน์ ศรีสุข) is a Thai professional footballer who is currently playing as a right midfielder.
