= Panuwat Meenapa =

Thai footballer

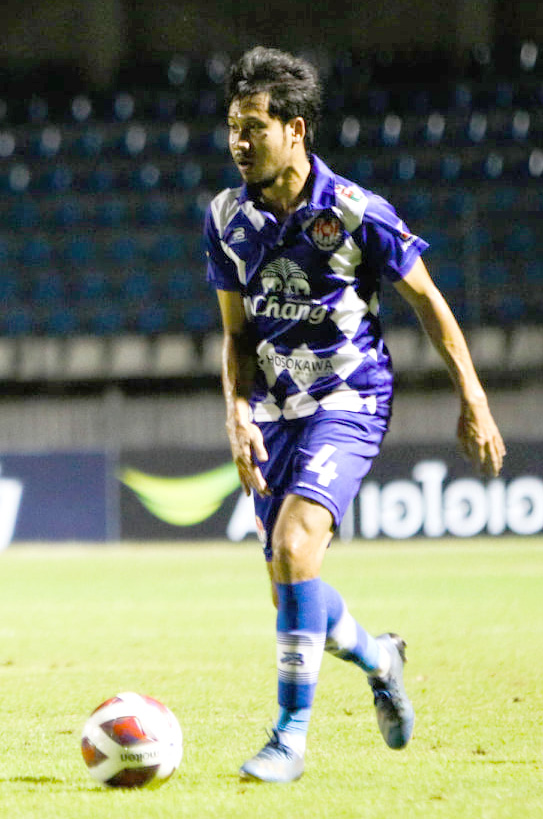

Personal information
- Full name: Panuwat Meenapa
- Date of birth: 26 December 1991 (age 34)
- Place of birth: Thailand
- Position: Attacking midfielder

Team information
- Current team: ACDC
- Number: 98

Senior career*
Years	Team	Apps	(Gls)
2015–2017	Navy	23	(0)
2017–2018	Phrae United		
2018	Navy	0	(0)
2019–2023	Navy	80	(1)
2023–	ACDC	17	(0)
- * Club domestic league appearances and goals

Panuwat Meenapa (Thai: ภาณุวัฒน์ มีนาภา) is a Thai professional footballer who currently plays for ACDC in Thai League 3 as an attacking midfielder.
