= Nantachot Pona =

Thai footballer (born 1982)

Personal information
- Full name: Nantachot Pona
- Date of birth: 13 March 1982 (age 44)
- Place of birth: Chaiyaphum, Thailand
- Height: 1.87 m (6 ft 1 1/2 in)
- Position: Center back

Senior career*
Years	Team	Apps	(Gls)
2004–2008	Chonburi	106	(4)
2009	Pattaya United	27	(1)
2010–2012	Chonburi	18	(0)
2012	→ Suphanburi (loan)	10	(0)
2013–2014	PTT Rayong	32	(2)
2014–2015	Port	26	(1)
2016	Khonkaen United	4	(0)
2016	Banbueng United	10	(0)
Total		233	(8)

International career
2006–2007	Thailand	12	(1)

Managerial career
- 2020: Banbueng
- 2021: Muangkan United
- 2023: Banbueng
- * Club domestic league appearances and goals as of 12 November 2008

Nantachot Pona (Thai: นันทโชต โพธิ์นา; born March 13, 1982) or formerly Phaisan Pona (Thai: ไพศาล โพธิ์นา), is a retired professional footballer from Thailand. He is a defender who scored 1 goal for the national team.

He played for Chonburi in the 2008 AFC Champions League group stages.

== Honours ==
=== Club ===
Chonburi F.C.

- Thailand Premier League: 2007
- Thai FA Cup: 2010
- Kor Royal Cup: 2008, 2011

== International goals ==
#	Date	Venue	Opponent	Score	Result	Competition
1.	March 26, 2006	Bangkok, Thailand	Philippines	5–0	Won	Friendly
