= ACDC F.C. =

ACDC สอ.รฝ.
- Full name: Air and Coastal Defense Command Football Club
- Nicknames: Rama's Mighty Arrow (พระรามแผลงศร)
- Founded: 2018; 8 years ago
- Ground: Battleship Stadium; Chonburi, Thailand
- Coordinates: 12°39′39″N 100°55′24″E
- Owner: Air and Coastal Defense Command
- Chairman: Surawong Wongwanich
- Head coach: Surakij Thepmanee
- League: Thai League 3
- 2025–26: Thai League 3, 12th of 12 in the Eastern region
- Website: web.facebook.com/สโมสรหน่วยบัญชาการต่อสู้อากาศยานและรักษาฝั่ง-สอรฝเอฟซี-1787507671498860

ACDC F.C. (Air and Coastal Defense Command Football Club or Thai สโมสรฟุตบอลหน่วยบัญชาการต่อสู้อากาศยานและรักษาฝั่ง) or its abbreviated name is ACDC Football Club (Thai สโมสรฟุตบอล สอ.รฝ.), is a Thai professional football club under the stewardship of Air and Coastal Defense Command, Royal Thai Navy based in Sattahip, Chonburi, Thailand. The club is currently playing in the Thai League 3 Eastern region.

== History ==
In 2018, the club was established.

In 2019, the club began to compete in the 2019 Thailand Amateur League Eastern region, using the Battleship stadium as the ground. At the end of the season, they have promoted to the 2020 Thai League 4.

In 2020, the club became a professional football club and competed in the Thai League 4. However, the Football Association of Thailand merged the Thai League 3 and Thai League 4. As a result of this incident, all teams in Thai League 4 were promoted to Thai League 3. The club competed in the Thai League 3 for the 2020–21 season. In late December 2020, the Coronavirus disease 2019 or also known as COVID-19 had spread again in Thailand, the FA Thailand must abruptly end the regional stage of the Thai League 3. The club has finished the ninth place of the Eastern region.

In 2021, the 2021–22 season was the second consecutive season in the Thai League 3 of ACDC. They started the season with a 1–4 away defeated to Pattaya Dolphins United and they ended the season with a 1–2 home defeated to the Pattaya Dolphins United. The club has finished seventh place in the league of the Eastern region. In addition, in the 2021–22 Thai League Cup ACDC was defeated 0–3 by Rajpracha in the qualification play-off round, causing them to be eliminated.

In 2022, ACDC competed in the Thai League 3 for the 2022–23 season. It is their 3rd season in the professional league. The club started the season with a 1–0 home win over Banbueng and they ended the season with a 0–1 away defeat to Banbueng. The club has finished 9th place in the league of the Eastern region. In addition, in the 2022–23 Thai FA Cup ACDC was penalty shoot-out defeated 3–4 by Prachinburi City in the first round, causing them to be eliminated and in the 2022–23 Thai League Cup ACDC was defeated 2–5 by Pluakdaeng United in the second qualification round, causing them to be eliminated too.

== Stadium and locations ==
Coordinates	Location	Stadium	Year
12°39′39″N 100°55′24″E	Chonburi (Sattahip)	Battleship Stadium	2018 – present

== Season by season record ==
Season	League									FA Cup	League Cup	T3 Cup	Top goalscorer	
Season	Division	P	W	D	L	F	A	Pts	Pos	FA Cup	League Cup	T3 Cup	Name	Goals
2019	TA East	3	2	1	0	13	5	7	1st	Opted out	Ineligible			
2020–21	T3 East	16	4	3	9	15	22	15	9th	Opted out	Opted out		(Thailand) Anucha Phasupho	4
2021–22	T3 East	22	8	8	6	30	33	32	7th	Opted out	QRP		(Thailand) Natchapol Jitkasem	8
2022–23	T3 East	22	7	3	12	23	32	24	9th	R1	QR2		(Thailand) Chusana Numkanitsorn	14
2023–24	T3 East	20	4	7	9	15	32	19	10th	Opted out	QR2	QR2	(Thailand) Chusana Numkanitsorn, (Thailand) Worachet Bumphenkiatitkul, (Thailand) Nitirach Mahaseana	2
2024–25	T3 East	22	9	5	8	34	31	32	5th	R1	R1	LP	(Nigeria) Mubarak Mohammed Ahmed	6
2025–26	T3 East	22	3	4	15	21	46	13	12th	R1	QR1	LP	(Nigeria) Jerry Ichako Akose	9

Champions	Runners-up	Promoted	Relegated

- P = Played
- W = Games won
- D = Games drawn
- L = Games lost
- F = Goals for
- A = Goals against
- Pts = Points
- Pos = Final position
- QR1 = First Qualifying Round
- QR2 = Second Qualifying Round
- R1 = Round 1
- R2 = Round 2
- R3 = Round 3
- R4 = Round 4
- R5 = Round 5
- R6 = Round 6
- QF = Quarter-finals
- SF = Semi-finals
- RU = Runners-up
- W = Winners

== Players ==
As of 20 September 2024

Note: Flags indicate national team as defined under FIFA eligibility rules; some limited exceptions apply. Players may hold more than one non-FIFA nationality.

No.	Pos.	Nation	Player
3	MF	THA	Chavalnat Khaow-on
5	DF	THA	Songsang Moungyon
7	MF	THA	Jakkapan Chanakarn
9	FW	THA	Apisit Nonkbathok
10	FW	THA	Chusana Numkanitsorn
11	FW	ENG	Benjamin Dixon
12	MF	THA	Watcharin Yatloet
15	MF	THA	Kittiphol Laengthaisong
17	MF	THA	Phasit Panmoon
18	GK	THA	Theerapat Odthon
19	MF	THA	Arthit Nongdai
20	MF	THA	Worachet Bumphenkiattikul
21	MF	THA	Natchapol Jitkasem
23	DF	THA	Phirathat Saksri
24	MF	THA	Sirichat Phumpat

No.	Pos.	Nation	Player
26	DF	THA	Sinlapachai Ketchan
28	DF	THA	Worawut Kotchada
29	FW	THA	Thanawin Chanaupatham
30	DF	THA	Aitsara Suktaeng
32	MF	THA	Manachai Supho
35	GK	THA	Natthaphon Kannika
36	DF	JPN	Ken Hagihara
40	MF	THA	Krisnatee Kaewrakmuk
43	DF	THA	Pongtawee Seeswang
55	MF	THA	Ratthathammanun Deeying
77	GK	THA	Thanakorn Korkaew
80	MF	THA	Pokpong Ninnawvarat
82	DF	THA	Aritit Sankla
96	DF	THA	Thanaporn Buayaem
98	MF	THA	Panuwat Meenapa
