= Banbueng F.C. =

Thai football club

Banbueng บ้านบึง
- Full name: Banbueng Football Club สโมสรฟุตบอลบ้านบึง
- Nickname: Banbueng Lions
- Founded: 2016; 10 years ago, as Banbueng United; 2017; 9 years ago, as Banbueng; 2018; 8 years ago, as Banbueng Phuket City; 2020; 6 years ago, as Banbueng
- Ground: IPE Chonburi Stadium; Chonburi, Thailand
- Capacity: 11,000
- Chairman: Akpiwat Pattanaphokimsakul
- Head Coach: Phaisan Pona
- League: Thailand Semi-pro League
- 2026: 2nd of 10 in the Eastern region
Home colours	Away colours

Banbueng Football Club (Thai: สโมสรฟุตบอลบ้านบึง) is a Thai football club based in Chonburi Province. The club participates in the Thailand Semi-pro League Eastern Region, the fourth tier of Thai football league system, following relegation from the Thai League 3 in 2022/23. The team plays their home matches at IPE Chonburi Stadium.

== History ==
In the case of Mr. Piti Polnukulpanich Director of Royal Raya Sports Co., Ltd. and President of Phuket F.C. Club. On November 28, 2017, the club announced a decision to cancel the team after FIFA ordered the former three foreign players to pay the amount of 83 million in a case filed from 2012 to 2015. The former executives canceled the unfair contract. Then there is the capital group from TTM or Thailand Tobacco Monopoly Football Club. Led by Nisit Srisang, a former technical advisor and secretary of the TTM F.C., was appointed as vice president and general manager of Phuket City Team, as well as Mr. Sujit Kalyanamit, former president of the TTM F.C. The new management team is Phuket City will be over the team of Banbueng F.C. to do the competition in the Thai League 3 South Region.

In 2020, the club was renamed back to Banbueng Football Club due to the take over of Banbueng's boards again. They have moved their ground back to Chonburi Province too.

Banbueng competed in the Thai League 3 for the 2022–23 season. The club started the season with a 0–1 away defeat to ACDC and they ended the season with a 1–0 home win over ACDC. The club finished in 12th place in the Eastern division and was relegated to the Thailand Semi-pro League for the 2023/24 season. In addition, in the 2022–23 Thai FA Cup, Banbueng was defeated 4-3 in a penalty shootout against Khon Kaen in the second round, eliminating them from the competition. In the 2022–23 Thai League Cup, Banbueng was eliminated by Chachoengsao Hi-Tek, after a narrow 1-0 defeat in the second qualification round.

Banbueng competed in the Thailand Semi-pro League for the 2023/24 season, where they finished 3rd, preventing them from advancing to the next round of the competition. They will compete in the league again for the 2024/25 season.

== Stadium and locations ==
Coordinates	Location	Stadium	Capacity	Year
13°19′07″N 101°06′58″E	Chonburi	Banbueng Municipality Stadium	2,500	2016–2017
7°53′20″N 98°22′19″E	Phuket	Surakul Stadium	16,000	2018–2019
13°24′41″N 100°59′37″E	Chonburi	IPE Chonburi Stadium	11,000	2020–present

== Seasonal record ==
As of 17 February 2021

Season	League									FA Cup	League Cup	Top goalscorer	
Season	Division	P	W	D	L	F	A	Pts	Pos	FA Cup	League Cup	Name	Goals
2016	Bangkok-East	18	9	5	4	30	19	32	3rd	R2	QR2		
2017	T3 Lower	28	8	6	14	29	48	30	12th	Not enter	QR2	(Ghana) Otis Sarfo Adjei	5
2018	T3 Lower	26	11	7	8	29	23	40	5th	Not enter	Not enter	(Thailand) Jaruwat Nammool	7
2019	T3 Lower	26	10	7	9	33	36	37	6th	Not enter	QR2	(Nigeria) Efe Obode	8
2020–21	T3 East	16	7	4	5	29	28	25	4th	R1	QR1	(Thailand) Nattapong Chaidee	3
2021–22	T3 East	22	3	7	12	22	38	16	10th	QR	QR1	(Ivory Coast) Oumar Sanou	2
2022–23	T3 East	22	5	5	12	19	27	20	12th	R2	QR2	(Ivory Coast) Konan Kouassi Martial Fabrice, (Thailand) Theerapat Kaewphung	6
2023–24	TS East	7	5	0	2	20	13	15	3rd	Opted out	Ineligible	(Thailand) Sirawit Benchamat	7

Champions	Runners-up	Promoted	Relegated
