= HQ-22 =

Chinese air defence system

HQ-22 / FK-3
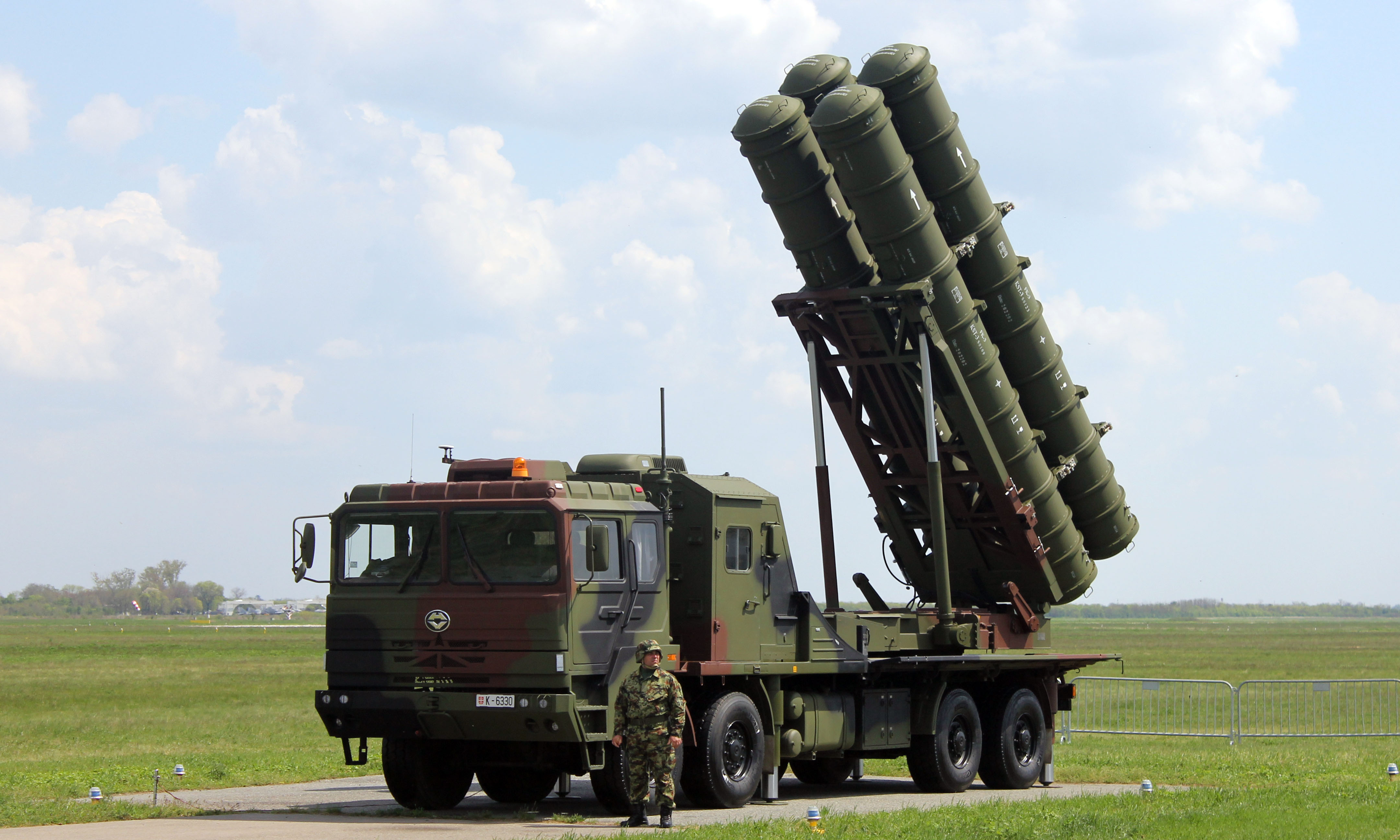
- Serbian Armed Forces FK-3 (export version of HQ-22)
- Type: Surface-to-air missile
- Place of origin: China

Service history
- In service: 2019–present
- Used by: See § Operators

Production history
- Manufacturer: China Aerospace Science and Industry Corporation (CASIC)

Specifications
- Detonation mechanism: Impact/proximity
- Engine: Rocket motor
- Propellant: Solid fuel
- Operational range: HQ-22: 170 kilometres (110 mi); FK-3: 100 kilometres (62 mi)
- Guidance system: Semi-active radar homing/radio-command guidance
- Launch platform: Ground

The HQ-22 (simplified Chinese: 红旗-22; traditional Chinese: 紅旗-22; pinyin: Hóng Qí-22; lit. 'Red Banner-22'; NATO reporting name: CH-SA-20) is a medium- to long-range semi-active radar homing/radio-command guidance air defence system developed and manufactured by the China Aerospace Science and Industry Corporation (CASIC).

== History ==
The HQ-22 was publicly revealed at the 2016 China International Aviation & Aerospace Exhibition.

The HQ-22 entered service with the People's Liberation Army Air Force (PLAAF) by 2019.

Serbia purchased the FK-3, the export variant, in 2019; they were delivered by PLAAF Xi'an Y-20 transport aircraft and entered service in April 2022. They were the first Chinese medium- or long-range air defence system exported to Europe.

In April 2021, India reported that China had deployed the HQ-22 near eastern Ladakh.

== Description ==
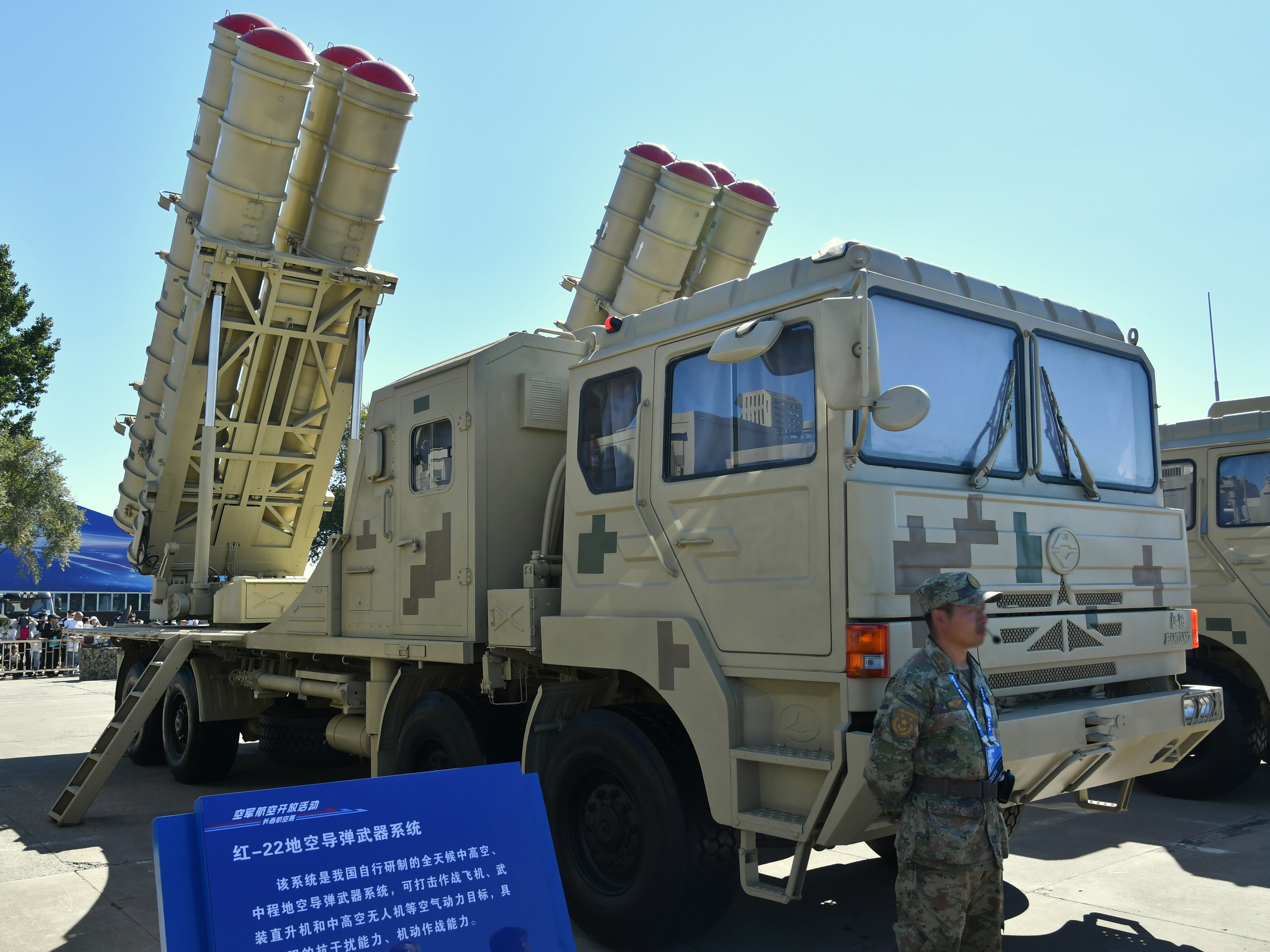
PLAAF HQ-22 system

The HQ-22 air defence system is a second generation development of the HQ-12 missile. It is intended as a low-cost replacement for the HQ-2.

The missile is "wingless" compared to the preceding HQ-12. The missile uses semi-active radar guidance to reduce cost, and may switch to radio command guidance in an environment with "strong electronic interference".

An HQ-22 unit includes four to eight transporter erector launchers, each with four missiles. The radar vehicle reportedly permits six targets to be engaged simultaneously.

== Variants ==
- HQ-22: Chinese domestic variant with speed of Mach 6 and a range of 170 kilometres (110 mi).
- HQ-22A: Chinese domestic variant, debuted at the 2025 China Victory Day Parade.
- FK-3: Export variant with speed of Mach 6 and a maximum range of 100 kilometres (62 mi).

== Operators ==
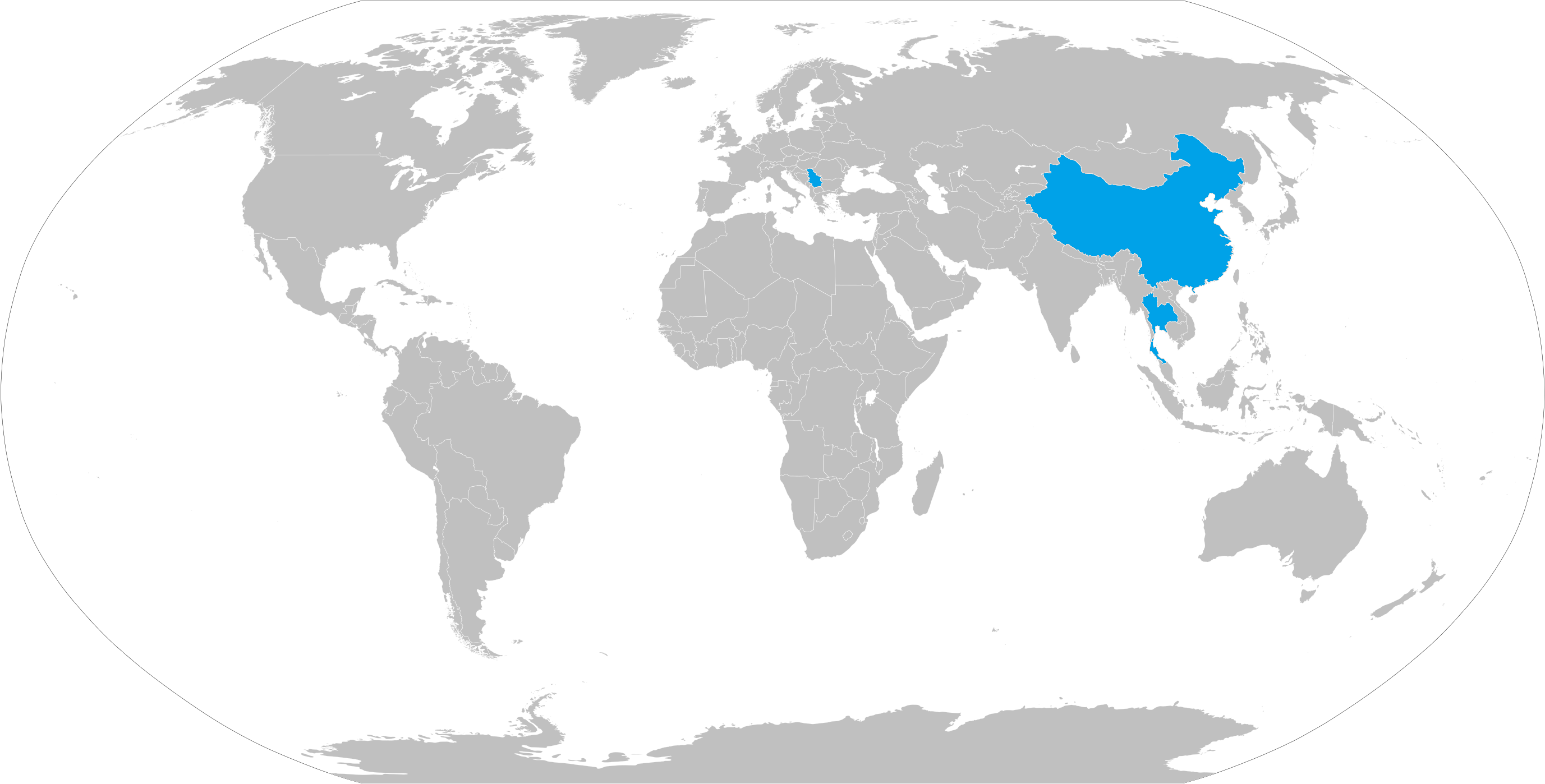

China

- People's Liberation Army Air Force - 130+ HQ-22

Serbia

- Serbian Air Force and Air Defence - 4 batteries FK-3

Thailand

- Air and Coastal Defense Command - 3 batteries FK-3

== Gallery ==
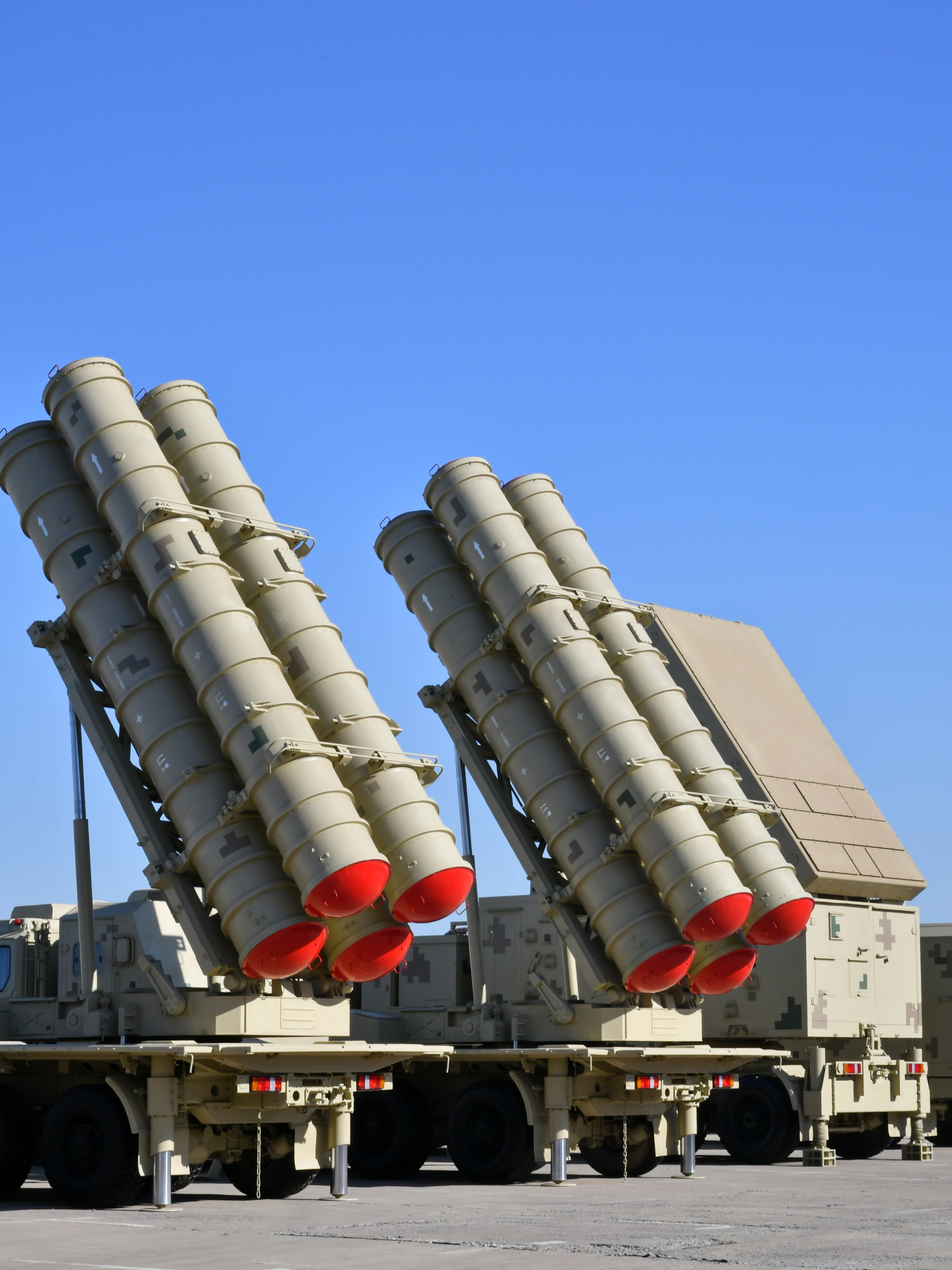
The system as seen from behind

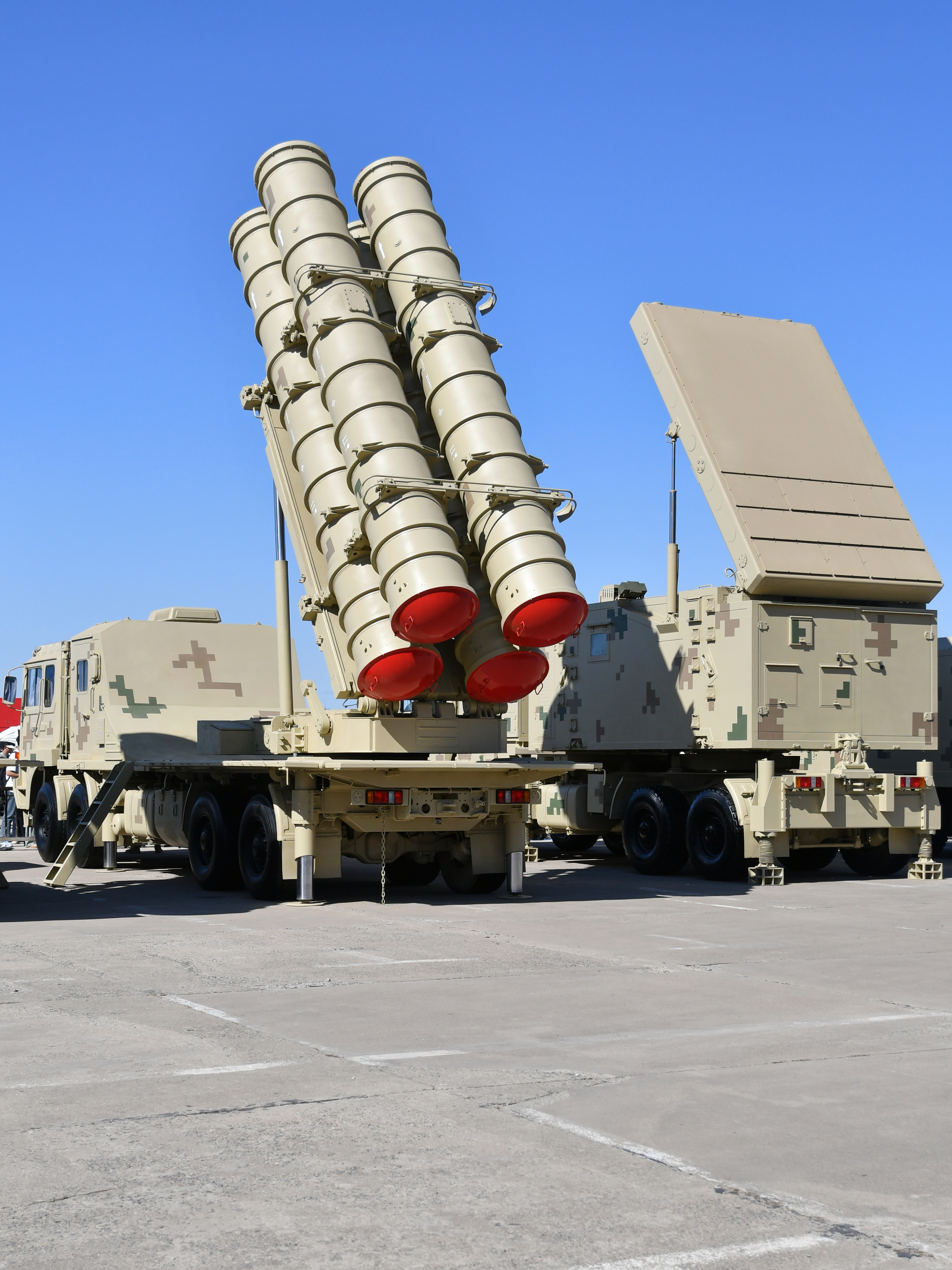
HQ-22 radar (right)

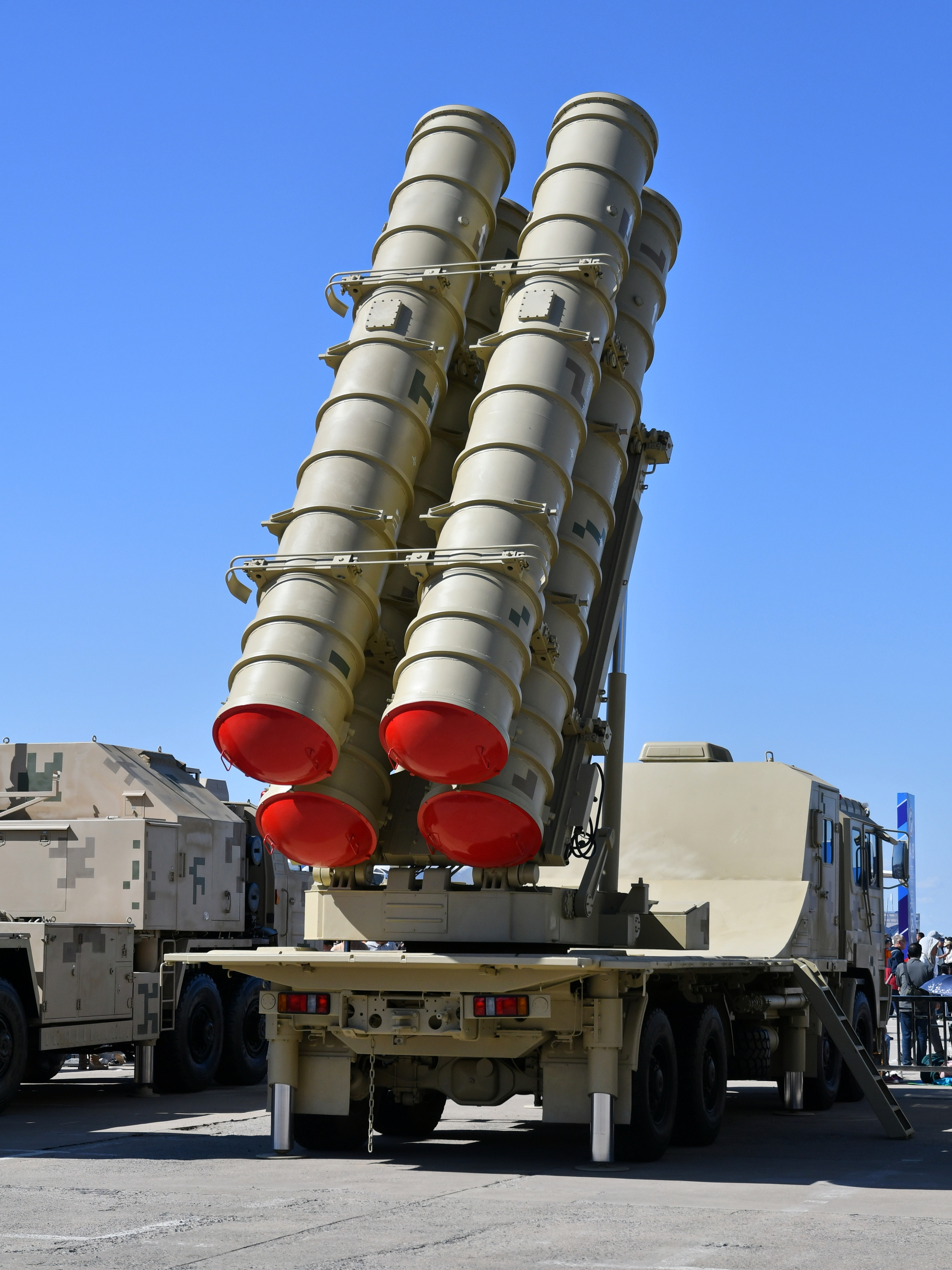
HQ-22 missile tube

== See also ==
- HQ-12
- HQ-9
