= 2022–23 Thai League 3 Eastern Region =

Thai League 3 Eastern Region
- Season: 2022–23
- Dates: 10 September 2022 – 18 March 2023
- Champions: Pattaya Dolphins United
- Relegated: Banbueng
- T3 National Championship: Pattaya Dolphins United; Chanthaburi
- Matches: 132
- Goals: 305 (2.31 per match)
- Top goalscorer: (Thailand) Chusana Numkanitsorn (13 goals; ACDC) (Brazil) Luan Santos (13 goals; Chanthaburi)
- Best goalkeeper: (Thailand) Surat Nakchumsang (6 clean sheets; Fleet) (Thailand) Nattakit Nimnual (6 clean sheets; Pattaya Dolphins United) (Thailand) Worawut Sukhuna (6 clean sheets; Pattaya Dolphins United) (Thailand) Kittisak Foofoong (6 clean sheets; Pluakdaeng United)
- Biggest home win: 4 goals difference Chachoengsao Hi-Tek 4–0 Pluakdaeng United (19 February 2023); Saimit Kabin United 5–1 Marines (18 March 2023)
- Biggest away win: 5 goals difference ACDC 0–5 Fleet (26 February 2023)
- Highest scoring: 7 goals ACDC 2–5 Marines (29 October 2022)
- Longest winning run: 6 matches Pattaya Dolphins United
- Longest unbeaten run: 9 matches Pattaya Dolphins United
- Longest winless run: 11 matches Navy
- Longest losing run: 7 matches Banbueng
- Highest attendance: 766; Pattaya Dolphins United 1–1 Chanthaburi (18 February 2023)
- Lowest attendance: 32; Assawin Kohkwang United 3–1 Marines (15 January 2023)
- Total attendance: 30,046
- Average attendance: 233

The 2022–23 Thai League 3 Eastern region is a region in the regional stage of the 2022–23 Thai League 3. The tournament was sponsored by Kongsalak Plus, and known as the Kongsalak Plus League for sponsorship purposes. A total of 12 teams located in Eastern of Thailand will compete in the league of the Eastern region.

== Teams ==
=== Number of teams by province ===
Position	Province	Number	Teams
1	Chonburi	6	ACDC, Banbueng, Fleet, Marines, Navy, and Pattaya Dolphins United
2	Chanthaburi	2	Assawin Kohkwang United and Chanthaburi
2	Rayong	2	Bankhai United and Pluakdaeng United
4	Chachoengsao	1	Chachoengsao Hi-Tek
4	Prachinburi	1	Saimit Kabin United

=== Stadiums and locations ===
Locations of the 2022–23 Thai League 3 Eastern region teams

Team	Location	Stadium	Coordinates
ACDC	Chonburi (Sattahip)	Battleship Stadium	12°39′39″N 100°55′24″E
Assawin Kohkwang United	Chanthaburi (Mueang)	Stadium of Rambhai Barni Rajabhat University	12°39′50″N 102°06′06″E
Banbueng	Chonburi (Banbueng)	Chang Football Park Stadium	13°18′09″N 101°12′10″E
Bankhai United	Rayong (Ban Khai)	Wai Krong Stadium	12°48′26″N 101°17′51″E
Chachoengsao Hi-Tek	Chachoengsao (Mueang)	Chachoengsao Municipality Stadium	13°41′24″N 101°04′06″E
Chanthaburi	Chanthaburi (Mueang)	Chanthaburi Provincial Stadium	12°36′36″N 102°06′20″E
Fleet	Chonburi (Sattahip)	Battleship Stadium	12°39′39″N 100°55′24″E
Marines	Chonburi (Sattahip)	Sattahip Navy Stadium	12°39′49″N 100°56′09″E
Navy	Chonburi (Sattahip)	Sattahip Navy Stadium	12°39′49″N 100°56′09″E
Pattaya Dolphins United	Chonburi (Bang Lamung)	Nong Prue Stadium	12°55′27″N 100°56′14″E
Pluakdaeng United	Rayong (Pluak Daeng)	CK Stadium	12°59′04″N 101°12′55″E
Saimit Kabin United	Prachinburi (Kabin Buri)	Nomklao Maharat Stadium	13°59′20″N 101°43′25″E

=== Foreign players ===
A T3 team could register 3 foreign players from foreign players all around the world. A team can use 3 foreign players on the field in each game.

Note :
(substituted off) : players who released during second leg transfer window;
(substituted in) : players who registered during second leg transfer window.

AFC member countries players.
CAF member countries players.
CONCACAF member countries players.
CONMEBOL member countries players.
OFC member countries players.
UEFA member countries players.
No foreign player registered.

Club	Leg	Player 1	Player 2	Player 3
ACDC	1st
ACDC	2nd	(Japan) Ken Hagihara (substituted in)	(South Korea) Yang Ju-hun (substituted in)
Assawin Kohkwang United	1st		(Ivory Coast) Kourouma Mohamed	(Ivory Coast) Soumahoro Mafa
Assawin Kohkwang United	2nd	(Ghana) Amagwe Clement Nana (substituted in)	(Ivory Coast) Kourouma Mohamed	(Ivory Coast) Soumahoro Mafa
Banbueng	1st	(Ivory Coast) Anani Koffi Rovales Fayçal (substituted off)	(Burkina Faso) Bahan Kanhi Cedrickk (substituted off)	(Ivory Coast) Konan Kouassi Martial Fabrice
Banbueng	2nd	(Brazil) Itamar Junior Alberto Bastos (substituted in)	(Brazil) Víctor Luis Ferreira Cabral (substituted in)	(Ivory Coast) Konan Kouassi Martial Fabrice
Bankhai United	1st	(Brazil) Vinícius Henrique Benedito Silva (substituted off)	(Brazil) Abner Gomes Faria (substituted off)	(Brazil) Luiz Carlos Ferreira Netto
Bankhai United	2nd	(Brazil) Guilherme Moreira (substituted in)	(Nigeria) Opeyemi Korede Ajayi (substituted in)	(Brazil) Luiz Carlos Ferreira Netto
Chachoengsao Hi-Tek	1st		(Brazil) Caio da Conceição Silva	(Cameroon) Nyamsi Jacques Dominique
Chachoengsao Hi-Tek	2nd	(Brazil) Vinícius Henrique Benedito Silva (substituted in)	(Brazil) Caio da Conceição Silva	(Cameroon) Nyamsi Jacques Dominique
Chanthaburi	1st	(Brazil) Luan Santos	(Brazil) Caio Rodrigues da Cruz	(Brazil) Alex Flávio
Chanthaburi	2nd	(Brazil) Luan Santos	(Brazil) Caio Rodrigues da Cruz	(Brazil) Alex Flávio
Fleet	1st
Fleet	2nd	(Nigeria) Ademola Sodiq Adeyemi (substituted in)	(Japan) Yushi Kawaguchi (substituted in)	(South Korea) Han Hye-ok (substituted in)
Marines	1st	(Cameroon) Nguimbus Ferdinand (substituted off)	(Cameroon) Akono Monayong Joseph Berand
Marines	2nd	(Egypt) Karim Essam Fathy Hassan (substituted in)	(Cameroon) Akono Monayong Joseph Berand
Navy	1st	(Brazil) Allan Machado de Souza Rosa (substituted off)	(South Korea) Yang Ju-hun (substituted off)	(South Korea) Park Ji-hwan
Navy	2nd	(Ivory Coast) Ibrahim Pooda Dah (substituted in)	(Australia) Ata Inia (substituted in)	(South Korea) Park Ji-hwan
Pattaya Dolphins United	1st	(Brazil) Caíque Freitas Ribeiro (substituted off)	(Brazil) Erivelto (substituted off)	(Brazil) Danilo
Pattaya Dolphins United	2nd	(Brazil) Elias (substituted in)	(Argentina) Nicolás Vélez (substituted in)	(Brazil) Danilo
Pluakdaeng United	1st	(Egypt) Mohamed Samir (substituted off)	(Iran) Eiman Kaabi (substituted off)	(Brazil) Thiago de Jesús dos Santos
Pluakdaeng United	2nd	(Iran) Sina Aghajani Vajargah (substituted in)	(South Korea) Mun Gi-hyun (substituted in)	(Brazil) Thiago de Jesús dos Santos
Saimit Kabin United	1st			(Brazil) Victor Clemente de Oliveira Capinan
Saimit Kabin United	2nd	(Brazil) Fabricio Peris Carneiro (substituted in)	(South Korea) Kim Jun-hyeon (substituted in)	(Brazil) Victor Clemente de Oliveira Capinan

== League table ==
=== Standings ===
Pos	Team	Pld	W	D	L	GF	GA	GD	Pts	Qualification or relegation
1	Pattaya Dolphins United (C, Q)	22	16	2	4	32	18	+14	50	Qualification to the National Championship stage
2	Chanthaburi (Q)	22	11	7	4	35	18	+17	40	Qualification to the National Championship stage
3	Saimit Kabin United	22	10	7	5	28	17	+11	37	
4	Chachoengsao Hi-Tek	22	10	3	9	29	28	+1	33	
5	Marines	22	8	6	8	31	31	0	30	
6	Fleet	22	8	5	9	27	28	−1	29 (Note: Fleet ahead on head-to-head points record; Fleet 6 pts, Pluakdaeng United 0 pts.)	
7	Pluakdaeng United	22	8	5	9	22	26	−4	29	
8	Bankhai United	22	5	10	7	20	26	−6	25	
9	ACDC	22	7	3	12	23	32	−9	24	
10	Assawin Kohkwang United	22	5	8	9	19	27	−8	23	
11	Navy	22	4	9	9	20	27	−7	21	
12	Banbueng (R)	22	5	5	12	19	27	−8	20	Relegation to the Thailand Semi-Pro League

Source: Thai League
Rules for classification: 1) Points; 2) Head-to-head points; 3) Head-to-head goal difference; 4) Head-to-head goal scored; 5) Overall goal difference; 6) Overall goal scored; 7) Fair play points; 8) Play-off without extra time).
(C) Champions; (Q) Qualified for the phase indicated; (R) Relegated

=== Positions by round ===
Team ╲ Round	1	2	3	4	5	6	7	8	9	10	11	12	13	14	15	16	17	18	19	20	21	22
Pattaya Dolphins United	3	3	1	2	4	1	1	1	1	1	1	1	1	1	1	1	1	1	1	1	1	1
Chanthaburi	2	6	7	8	5	2	2	3	3	3	2	2	2	2	2	2	2	2	2	2	2	2
Saimit Kabin United	12	4	5	9	7	7	8	9	10	11	9	5	4	3	4	4	3	3	3	3	3	3
Chachoengsao Hi-Tek	1	9	4	6	3	6	3	6	8	9	7	10	8	5	5	5	5	4	6	4	4	4
Marines	6	8	9	5	8	9	4	2	2	2	3	4	5	6	6	6	6	5	5	6	5	5
Fleet	7	11	11	12	12	12	12	12	12	12	12	12	12	12	12	12	10	10	7	7	7	6
Pluakdaeng United	9	5	6	7	9	5	7	4	4	4	4	3	3	4	3	3	4	6	4	5	6	7
Bankhai United	5	2	3	1	2	3	5	5	6	7	10	8	6	7	7	7	9	9	9	10	10	8
ACDC	4	1	2	3	1	4	6	8	11	5	8	6	9	8	8	8	7	7	10	8	8	9
Assawin Kohkwang United	10	10	10	10	11	11	11	11	7	8	6	9	7	9	9	9	8	8	8	9	9	10
Navy	8	12	12	11	10	10	10	10	5	6	11	11	11	11	11	11	12	12	12	12	11	11
Banbueng	11	7	8	4	6	8	9	7	9	10	5	7	10	10	10	10	11	11	11	11	12	12

Source: Thai League
= Qualification to the National Championship stage; = Relegation to the Thailand Amateur League

=== Results by round ===
Team ╲ Round	1	2	3	4	5	6	7	8	9	10	11	12	13	14	15	16	17	18	19	20	21	22
Pattaya Dolphins United	W	W	W	L	L	W	W	W	W	L	W	W	W	W	W	W	D	D	W	L	W	W
Chanthaburi	W	L	D	D	W	W	W	L	L	W	W	W	W	D	W	L	W	D	D	D	W	D
Saimit Kabin United	L	W	D	L	W	D	L	D	D	L	W	W	W	W	D	W	D	W	L	D	W	W
Chachoengsao Hi-Tek	W	L	W	L	W	L	W	L	L	D	D	L	W	W	D	W	L	W	L	W	W	L
Marines	W	L	D	W	L	D	W	W	W	D	L	L	L	D	L	D	W	W	D	L	W	L
Fleet	L	L	L	L	L	D	D	L	W	W	L	D	L	D	D	W	W	W	W	W	L	W
Pluakdaeng United	L	W	D	D	D	W	L	W	D	L	W	W	L	D	W	W	L	L	W	L	L	L
Bankhai United	W	W	D	W	L	D	L	D	L	D	L	D	W	D	D	L	L	D	D	D	L	W
ACDC	W	W	D	L	W	L	L	L	L	W	L	W	L	D	D	L	W	L	L	W	L	L
Assawin Kohkwang United	L	L	D	W	L	D	W	D	W	D	D	L	W	L	D	L	W	L	D	D	L	L
Navy	L	L	L	W	W	D	D	D	W	D	L	L	L	L	L	D	L	D	D	D	W	D
Banbueng	L	W	D	W	D	L	L	W	L	D	W	L	L	L	L	L	L	L	D	D	L	W

Source: Thai League
W = Won; D = Drawn; L = Lost

=== Results ===
Home \ Away	ACD	KKW	BBG	BKU	CCH	CTB	FLT	MRE	NVY	PAT	PDU	KBU
ACDC	—	2–0	1–0	0–0	2–0	2–2	0–5	2–5	2–1	2–0	0–1	0–3
Assawin Kohkwang United	0–0	—	1–0	0–1	0–0	1–0	0–2	3–1	1–1	3–2	1–3	1–2
Banbueng	1–0	1–2	—	0–0	2–1	3–2	2–0	3–0	0–2	1–2	1–2	0–1
Bankhai United	2–1	1–0	1–1	—	2–2	0–2	0–0	2–2	1–1	0–2	1–0	1–1
Chachoengsao Hi-Tek	1–0	2–1	2–1	4–2	—	3–2	2–1	0–0	4–1	0–1	4–0	0–2
Chanthaburi	2–0	1–1	2–0	3–0	2–0	—	3–1	1–0	2–1	1–2	0–0	3–0
Fleet	2–1	2–2	4–2	0–2	1–0	0–2	—	0–1	1–1	0–2	1–0	1–1
Marines	3–2	1–1	2–0	2–1	0–1	1–2	1–1	—	2–2	0–1	3–1	1–0
Navy	0–2	0–0	0–0	1–1	0–2	1–1	1–2	0–0	—	0–1	0–2	2–1
Pattaya Dolphins United	0–2	2–0	1–0	1–0	2–0	1–1	3–1	3–2	1–4	—	2–0	1–0
Pluakdaeng United	3–2	2–0	0–0	1–1	3–1	1–1	0–1	0–3	0–1	1–2	—	1–0
Saimit Kabin United	1–0	1–1	1–1	2–1	3–0	0–0	2–1	5–1	1–0	0–0	1–1	—

Source: Thai League
Legend: Blue = home team win; Yellow = draw; Red = away team win.
For upcoming matches, an "a" indicates there is an article about the rivalry between the two participants.

== Season statistics ==
=== Top scorers ===
As of 18 March 2023.

Rank	Player	Club	Goals
1	(Thailand) Chusana Numkanitsorn	ACDC	13
1	(Brazil) Luan Santos	Chanthaburi	13
3	(Brazil) Caio da Conceição Silva	Chachoengsao Hi-Tek	12
4	(Brazil) Danilo	Pattaya Dolphins United	10
5	(Thailand) Sarawut Choenchai	Chachoengsao Hi-Tek	9
5	(Nigeria) Ademola Sodiq Adeyemi	Fleet	9

=== Hat-tricks ===
Player	For	Against	Result	Date
(Thailand) Sarawut Choenchai	Chachoengsao Hi-Tek	Navy	4–1 (H)	25 September 2022
(Thailand) Worachet Prapaipak	Marines	ACDC	5–2 (A)	29 October 2022
(Brazil) Luan Santos	Chanthaburi	Saimit Kabin United	3–0 (H)	13 November 2022
(Thailand) Kanokphol Nuchrungrueang	Fleet	Banbueng	4–2 (H)	18 February 2023
(Nigeria) Ademola Sodiq Adeyemi	Fleet	ACDC	5–0 (A)	26 February 2023
(Brazil) Luan Santos	Chanthaburi	Fleet	3–1 (H)	12 March 2023

Notes: (H) = Home team; (A) = Away team

=== Clean sheets ===
As of 18 March 2023.

Rank	Player	Club	Clean sheets
1	(Thailand) Surat Nakchumsang	Fleet	6
1	(Thailand) Nattakit Nimnual	Pattaya Dolphins United	6
1	(Thailand) Worawut Sukhuna	Pattaya Dolphins United	6
1	(Thailand) Kittisak Foofoong	Pluakdaeng United	6
5	(Thailand) Chairat Ketsaratikun	Assawin Kohkwang United	5
5	(Thailand) Pitsanu Permsab	Chachoengsao Hi-Tek	5
5	(Thailand) Sarawut Konglarp	Chanthaburi	5
5	(Thailand) Saharit Phimphanit	Navy	5
5	(Thailand) Sarayut Poolsap	Saimit Kabin United	5

== Attendances ==
=== Overall statistical table ===
Pos	Team	Total	High	Low	Average	Change
1	Pattaya Dolphins United	6,283	766	462	629	n/a
2	Chachoengsao Hi-Tek	3,639	522	241	364	n/a
3	Chanthaburi	3,091	520	77	281	n/a
4	Navy	2,603	500	89	237	n/a
5	Pluakdaeng United	2,348	345	90	214	n/a
6	Marines	1,752	385	107	176	n/a
7	Fleet	1,852	399	105	169	n/a
8	Assawin Kohkwang United	1,804	285	32	164	n/a
9	Bankhai United	1,799	485	50	164	n/a
10	ACDC	1,799	350	99	164	n/a
11	Saimit Kabin United	1,575	211	83	144	n/a
12	Banbueng	1,501	250	70	137	n/a
	League total	30,046	766	32	233	n/a

Source: Thai League
