= Air and Coastal Defense Command =

- หน่วยบัญชาการต่อสู้อากาศยานและรักษาฝั่ง
- Air and Coastal Defense Command insignia
- Active: 13 August 1990
- Country: Thailand
- Branch: Royal Thai Navy
- Size: 42,000
- Garrison/HQ: ACDC headquarters, Sattahip, Chonburi
- Anniversaries: 13 August

The Air and Coastal Defense Command or ACDC (Thai: หน่วยบัญชาการต่อสู้อากาศยานและรักษาฝั่ง) or shortly called in Thai as (Thai: สอ.รฝ.) is the Anti-aircraft warfare and Coastal defence force of the Royal Thai Navy. This Command is composed of the two Air Defence Regiment and one Coastal Defence Regiment. Even though they are mainly artillerymen, they are trained in skills related to self-defense on the battlefield if the fire base is attacked or attacked while moving. They are also trained in protecting equipment, facilities and operations from threats or hazards in order to preserve operational effectiveness.

== History ==
In 1975 the Ministry of Defense approved the principle of air defense with the Royal Thai Navy establishing Air defense fighting unit doing Air defense duties in the area of responsibility of the Navy, such as naval bases and important military locations. On 23 November 1981, the Navy upgraded the air defense unit to the Department of Air and Coastal Defence go directly to Sattahip Naval Base using the area that has been returned from the Royal Thai Air Force. Department of Air and Coastal Defence has been greatly expanded in 1992, following the government's decision in 1988 to charge the Royal Thai Navy with the responsibility of defending the entire eastern seaboard and Southern Seaboard Development Project. As a result of the 1988 government resolution, the responsibility of the navy has been expanded. Beyond the strength of the department, therefore, on 13 August 1990 the Navy upgraded the Department of Air and Coastal Defence to The Air and Coastal Defense Command.

Coastal Defence Command was formed in 1992 under the control of the Royal Fleet Headquarters, with one coastal defence regiment and one air defence regiment. Personnel were initially drawn from the Royal Thai Marine Corps, but are now being recruited directly. The First Coastal Defence Regiment is based near the Marine Corps facility at Sattahip. The First Air Defence Regiment was near the Naval Air Wing at Utapao. Coastal Defence Command was greatly expanded in 1992, following the government's decision in 1988 to charge the RTN with the responsibility of defending the entire eastern seaboard and Southern Seaboard Development Project. The Second Air Defence Regiment, based at Songkhla, was then formed the following year. Some analysts believe that this element will eventually grow to a strength of up to 15,000 personnel.

== Structure of Air and Coastal Defense Command ==
ACB = Air Combat Battalion
CDB = Coastal Defense Battalion

The headquarters of Air and Coastal Defense Command has 12 commanding units as follows;

- Personnel Division
- Intelligence Division
- Operations Division
- Logistics Division
- Division of Communication and Information Technology
- Budget Division
- Science and Safety Aviation Division
- Division of Engineering Plans
- Administration Department
- Finance Department
- Judge Advocate Department
- Chaplain Department

=== Combat Structure ===
- 1st Air Defence Regiment: their mission is to provide anti-aircraft warfare for the northern Gulf of Thailand with three anti-aircraft battalions.
  - 11th Air Combat Battalion, Ban Chang, Rayong
  - 12th Air Combat Battalion, Si Racha, Chon Buri
  - 13th Air Combat Battalion, Phra Samut Chedi, Samut Prakan
- 2nd Air Defence Regiment: to provide anti-aircraft warfare for the southern Gulf of Thailand and Andaman Sea with three anti-aircraft battalions.
  - 21st Air Combat Battalion, Khanom, Nakhon Si Thammarat
  - 22nd Air Combat Battalion, Thai Mueang, Phang Nga
  - 23rd Air Combat Battalion, Mueang Songkhla, Songkhla
- 1st Coastal Defence Regiment: has three artillery battalions.
  - 11th Coastal Defense Battalion, Thai Mueang, Phang Nga
  - 12th Coastal Defense Battalion, Mueang Songkhla, Songkhla
  - 13th Coastal Defense Battalion, Sattahip, Chon Buri
- Air and Coastal Defence Operations Centers
  - 1st Air and Coastal Defense Operations Center Region
    - 1st Control and Reporting Center
    - 2nd Control and Reporting Center
  - 2nd Air and Coastal Defense Operations Center Region
    - 1st Control and Reporting Center
    - 2nd Control and Reporting Center
- Air and Coastal Defence Supporting Regiment:
  - Transportation Battalion
  - Medical Battalion
  - Communications and Electronics Battalion
  - Repair and Maintenance Battalion
  - 1st Headquarters Annex
  - 2nd Headquarters Annex
  - 3rd Headquarters Annex
- Air and Coastal Defense Training Center (ACDTC)
  - Air and Coastal Defense School
  - Air and Coastal Defense Private Training Division
  - Air and Coastal Defense Training Battalion
  - Support Section

== Equipment ==
=== Weapons ===
Model	Origin	Type	Notes
Howitzers
Type 59-I	China	130 mm towed howitzer	
GHN-45	Austria	155 mm towed howitzer	
Anti-aircraft gun
Type 74	China	37 mm; auto cannon gun	
Bofors	Sweden	40 mm; auto cannon gun	40L60 (M1) 40L70
Surface-to-air missiles
FK-3	China	Surface-to-air missiles	
9K38 Igla-S	Russia	MANPADS	
QW-18	China	MANPADS	

=== Radar ===
Name	Origin	Type	Notes
Radar
ST Mk.2	United States; Germany	Short range radar	Raytheon Anschutz Pathfinder/ST Mk.2
Thales BOR-A 550	France	Short range radar	
AN/GPN-20/27	United States	Medium range radar	Northrop Grumman ASR-8 (AN/GPN-20/27)
KRONOS LAND 3-D	Italy	Medium range radar	KRONOS LAND 3-D Multi-function Mobile Radar
Saab Giraffe AMB	Sweden	Medium range radar	

=== Logistic vehicle ===
Name	Origin	Type	Notes
Truck
Isuzu Forward	Thailand; Japan	Truck	2 1/2 Tons, Isuzu Forward 4×4.
Pinzgauer 716	Austria	Truck	2 1/2 Tons, BAE Systems Pinzgauer 716 4×4.
Pinzgauer 718	Austria	Truck	2 1/2 Tons, BAE Systems Pinzgauer 718 6×6.
Dongfeng EQ240/EQ2081	China	Truck	2 1/2 Tons, Dongfeng EQ2081E (EQ4D) 6×6.
Ashok Leyland Stallion	India	Truck	5 Tons, Ashok Leyland Stallion 6×6.
Pegaso 3055	Spain	Truck	7 Tons, Pegaso 3055/7323 6×6.
Shaanqi SX2190	China	Truck	7 Tons, Shaanqi (Yanan) SX2190 6×6.
Steyr 1491	Austria	Truck	10 Tons, Steyr 1491 (Percheron) 6×6.

== Historic Equipments ==
Name	Origin	Type	Notes
Historic Equipments
Madsen	Denmark	20 mm; auto cannon gun	
PL-9	China	Short-range SAM	

== Engagements ==
- Southern Insurgency
- Cambodian–Thai border dispute

== Rank structure ==
Equivalent NATO Code	OF-10	OF-9	OF-8	OF-7	OF-6	OF-5	OF-4	OF-3	OF-2	OF-1		Cadet Officer
Officer ranks
Officer ranks	จอมพลเรือ	พลเรือเอก	พลเรือโท	พลเรือตรี	พลเรือจัตวา^{1}	นาวาเอก	นาวาโท	นาวาตรี	เรือเอก	เรือโท	เรือตรี	นักเรียนนายเรือ
Officer ranks	Admiral of the Fleet	Admiral	Vice Admiral	Rear Admiral	Commodore or Rear Admiral (lower half)^{1}	Captain	Commander	Lieutenant Commander	Lieutenant	Lieutenant; Junior Grade	Sub Lieutenant	Midshipman
Officer ranks	^{1}Rank on paper, not actually used in the Royal Thai Navy.

Equivalent NATO Code	OR-9		OR-8	OR-7	OR-5	OR-4	OR-3	OR-1
Enlisted ranks								No insignia
Enlisted ranks	พันจ่าเอกพิเศษ	พันจ่าเอก	พันจ่าโท	พันจ่าตรี	จ่าเอก	จ่าโท	จ่าตรี	พลทหาร
Enlisted ranks	Master Chief Petty; Officer	Senior Chief Petty; Officer	Chief Petty; Officer	Petty Officer; 1st class	Petty Officer; 2nd Class	Petty Officer; 3rd Class	Seaman	Seaman apprentice

== See also ==
- Admiral Prince Abhakara Kiartiwongse Prince of Chumphon
- Royal Thai Armed Forces Headquarters
- Military of Thailand
- Royal Thai Army
- Royal Thai Air Force
- Royal Thai Marine Corps
- Royal Thai Naval Academy
