= Chusana Numkanitsorn =

Thai footballer

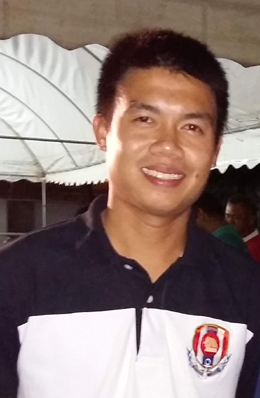

Personal information
- Full name: Chusana Numkanitsorn
- Date of birth: 31 March 1989 (age 37)
- Place of birth: Thailand
- Height: 1.75 m (5 ft 9 in)
- Position: Left winger

Team information
- Current team: ACDC
- Number: 7

Senior career*
Years	Team	Apps	(Gls)
2015–2021	Navy	112	(14)
2021–	ACDC	41	(15)
- * Club domestic league appearances and goals as of 18 March 2023

Chusana Numkanitsorn (Thai: ชุษณะ นัมคณิสร) is a Thai professional footballer who is currently playing for ACDC in Thai League 3 as a left-winger.
