= 2017 Thai League 4 Bangkok Metropolitan Region =

Thai League 4 Bangkok Metropolitan Region
- Season: 2017
- Champions: North Bangkok University
- Relegated: Samut Prakan United
- Matches played: 165
- Goals scored: 433 (2.62 per match)
- Top goalscorer: Nattawut Suksum (21 Goals)
- Biggest home win: BCC 9–2 Samut Prakan United (10 September 2017)
- Biggest away win: Kopoon Warrior 1–7 North Bangkok University (19 March 2017)
- Highest scoring: BCC 9–2 Samut Prakan United (10 September 2017)
- Longest winning run: 5 matches Samut Prakan
- Longest unbeaten run: 11 matches Samut Prakan
- Longest losing run: 8 matches Samut Prakan United
- Highest attendance: 1,014; Looktabfah Pathum Thani 2–1 Samut Prakan (12 March 2017)
- Lowest attendance: 29; Dome 2–1 Looktabfah Pathum Thani (31 August 2017)
- Total attendance: 32,702
- Average attendance: 201

2017 Thai League 4 Bangkok Metropolitan Region is the 9th season of the League competition since its establishment in 2009. It is in the 4th tier of the Thai football league system.

== Changes from last season ==
=== Team changes ===
==== Promoted clubs ====
Promoted to the 2017 Thai League 2

- Kasetsart University

Three club was promoted to the 2017 Thai League 3 Southern Region.

- Chamchuri United
- BU.Deffo
- Army

Promoted from 2016 Thai Division 3 Tournament Central Region

- Singburi Kopoon

==== Relegated clubs ====
- Air Force Robinson Relegated to 2016 Thai Division 3 Tournament Central Region

==== Relocated clubs ====
- Samut Prakan were moved from the Eastern 2016.
- Samut Prakan United were moved from the Bangkok & Eastern 2016.
- PTU Pathum Thani were moved from the Central Region 2016.

==== Renamed clubs ====
- Bangkok Glass B authorize from Rangsit
- Singburi Kopoon was renamed to Kopoon Warrior

=== Reserving clubs ===
- Bangkok Glass B is Bangkok Glass Reserving this team which join Northern Region first time.
- Bangkok United B is Bangkok United Reserving this team which join Northern Region first time.

== Stadium and locations ==
Locations of the 2017 Thai League 4 Bangkok Metropolitan Region teams

Team	Province	Stadium	Ref.
BCC	Lak Si, Bangkok	TOT Stadium Chaeng Watthana	
Bangkok Glass B	Pathum Thani	Leo Stadium	
Bangkok United B	Pathum Thani	Thammasat Stadium	
Dome	Pathum Thani	Thammasat Stadium	
Grakcu Look Tabfah Pathum Thani	Pathum Thani	Thupatemi Stadium	
North Bangkok University	Pathum Thani	North Bangkok University Stadium (Rangsit)	
PTU Pathumthani	Bang Khen, Bangkok	Boonyachinda Stadium	
Rangsit University	Pathum Thani	Rangsit University Stadium	
Samut Prakan	Samut Prakan	Samut Prakarn SAT Stadium (Keha Bang Phli)	
Samut Prakan United	Samut Prakan	Lam Fah Pha Subdistrict Municipality Stadium	
Kopoon Warrior	Phra Nakhon Si Ayutthaya	Ayutthaya Province Stadium	

Football clubs in Bangkok Metropolitan Region

== League table ==
Pos	Team	Pld	W	D	L	GF	GA	GD	Pts	Qualification or relegation
1	North Bangkok University (C, Q)	30	15	11	4	50	27	+23	56	Qualification to the Thai League 4 Champions League
2	Samut Prakan (Q)	30	14	9	7	51	29	+22	51 (Note: All head-to-head records was equivalent. Samut Prakan ahead on overall goals difference; Rangsit University +22, Bangkok United B +17.)	Qualification to the Thai League 4 Champions League
3	Bangkok United B	30	14	9	7	56	39	+17	51	
4	BCC	30	12	9	9	49	37	+12	45	
5	Dome	30	11	10	9	32	28	+4	43	
6	Kopoon Warrior	30	11	8	11	35	41	−6	41	
7	PTU Pathum Thani	30	9	11	10	35	35	0	38	
8	Rangsit University	30	8	11	11	29	36	−7	35 (Note: All head-to-head records was equivalent. Rangsit University ahead on overall goals difference; Rangsit University -7, Bangkok Glass B -10.)	
9	Bangkok Glass B (Note: Bangkok Glass B have finished lower than 8th place. So, they could not compete in T4 for one season by the rules of FA Thailand.)	30	8	11	11	34	44	−10	35	Could not compete in 2018 Thai League 4
10	Grakcu Looktabfah Pathum Thani	30	9	7	14	39	52	−13	34	
11	Samut Prakan United (R)	30	5	2	23	27	69	−42	17	Relegation to the 2018 Thailand Amateur League

Updated to match(es) played on 20 October 2017. Source: Thai League 4
Rules for classification: 1) Points; 2) Head-to-head points; 3) Head-to-head goals difference; 4) Head-to-head goals scored; 5) Overall goals difference; 6) Overall goals scored; 7) Fair play points; 8) Play-off without extra time;).
(C) Champions; (Q) Qualified for the phase indicated; (R) Relegated

== Results 1st and 2nd match for each team ==
Home \ Away	BCC	BKGB	BKUB	DOM	GRA	NBK	PTUP	RSU	SAP	SPU	KOW
BCC		1–2	1–3	0–1	2–2	2–1	0–0	2–2	1–0	3–0	1–0
Bangkok Glass B	1–1		3–3	1–1	3–2	1–1	2–1	1–0	1–2	2–2	0–0
Bangkok United B	1–1	4–5		1–0	0–0	1–2	3–1	3–1	3–2	5–1	2–2
Dome	0–1	1–1	1–1		2–1	1–1	0–0	5–0	2–2	0–1	1–0
Grakcu Look Tabfah Pathum Thani	1–2	4–2	1–1	1–2		0–1	2–4	2–0	2–1	1–0	1–1
North Bangkok University	1–2	0–0	3–4	2–2	1–0		2–2	2–2	1–0	3–0	2–1
PTU Pathumthani	2–2	1–0	1–2	1–1	2–2	0–1		0–1	1–1	2–0	2–0
Rangsit University	0–1	1–0	1–1	1–0	1–1	1–1	2–0		1–1	1–0	2–0
Samut Prakan	0–0	1–0	0–0	2–0	2–0	1–2	1–1	0–0		2–1	5–1
Samut Prakan United	2–0	2–3	0–3	0–1	0–1	0–4	1–2	1–0	0–2		1–1
Kopoon Warrior	2–1	0–0	1–0	0–0	2–1	1–7	1–1	2–1	1–0	0–1	

Updated to match(es) played on 19 July 2017. Source: Thai League 4
Legend: Blue = home team win; Yellow = draw; Red = away team win.

== Results 3rd match for each team ==
In the third leg, the winner on head-to-head result of the first and the second leg will be home team. If head-to-head result are tie, must to find the home team from head-to-head goals different. If all of head-to-head still tie, must to find the home team from penalty kickoff on the end of each second leg match (This penalty kickoff don't bring to calculate points on league table, it's only the process to find the home team on third leg).

Home \ Away	BCC	BKGB	BKUB	DOM	GRA	NBK	PTUP	RSU	SAP	SPU	KOW
BCC					5–1	1–1	2–3	1–3	1–1	9–2	0–2
Bangkok Glass B	0–2		0–2							1–0	1–1
Bangkok United B	3–2			0–2	1–0	1–2	0–0	3–1	1–3	4–1	
Dome	0–2	0–1			2–1	0–2	1–0	1–1		2–1	2–1
Grakcu Look Tabfah Pathum Thani		2–1						3–2		3–2	
North Bangkok University		1–0			1–1		1–0		2–2	0–1	2–0
PTU Pathumthani		3–2			1–2				2–1	2–1	0–1
Rangsit University		0–0				0–0	0–0			2–1	1–2
Samut Prakan		5–0		2–1	4–1			2–1		3–2	3–0
Samut Prakan United											3–7
Kopoon Warrior			1–0		4–0						

Updated to match(es) played on 11 September 2017. Source: Thai League 4
Legend: Blue = home team win; Yellow = draw; Red = away team win.

== Season statistics ==
=== Top scorers ===
As of 11 September 2017.

Rank	Player	Club	Goals
1	(Thailand) Nattawut Suksum	Bangkok United B	21
2	(Thailand) Sirichai Lamphuttha	North Bangkok University	13
3	(Thailand) Weerapat Ninburapa	Bangkok Glass B	12
3	(France) Platel Remi	BCC	12
5	(Thailand) Patipat Kamsat	BCC	10
5	(Thailand) Rachanon Srinok	Dome	10
5	(Thailand) Poomipat Kantanet	North Bangkok University	10
5	(Thailand) Phakpoom Malirungruang	Samut Prakan	10
9	(Ghana) Gabriel Mintah	Samut Prakan	9
10	(Thailand) Jirayut Niamthaisong	Bangkok United B	8

== Attendance ==
Pos	Team	Total	High	Low	Average	Change
1	Kopoon Warrior	4,221	670	50	351	n/a
2	Bangkok Glass B	4,338	517	178	333	n/a
3	North Bangkok University	4,700	500	200	293	n/a
4	Samut Prakan	3,808	480	120	238	n/a
5	Rangsit University	3,317	425	80	221	n/a
6	Look Tabfah Pathum Thani	2,212	1,014	50	201	n/a
7	Dome	2,909	273	29	161	n/a
8	Samut Prakan United	1,505	327	43	136	n/a
9	PTU Pathumthani	1,902	183	70	126	n/a
10	Bangkok United B	1,989	200	52	110	n/a
11	Bangkok Christian College	1,640	177	59	96	n/a
	League total	32,702	1,014	29	201	n/a

Updated to games played on 11 September 2017
Source: Thai League 4

== See also ==
- 2017 Thai League
- 2017 Thai League 2
- 2017 Thai League 3
- 2017 Thai League 4
- 2017 Thailand Amateur League
- 2017 Thai FA Cup
- 2017 Thai League Cup
- 2017 Thailand Champions Cup
