= Regional League Bangkok Area Division =

- Founded: 2009
- Folded: 2017
- Country: Thailand
- Number of clubs: 11
- Level on pyramid: 3
- Promotion to: Regional League Division 2
- Domestic cup(s): Thai FA Cup; Thai League Cup
- Last champions: Chamchuri United (2016)
- Website: http://www.d2.in.th
- Current: 2016

Regional League Bangkok Area Division is one of six 3rd Level Leagues in Thailand. It was formed in 2009 along with other four other regional leagues at the time. Currently the winner and runner up of each regional league enter the Regional League Championships to determine the three teams that will receive promotion to the Thai Division 1 League.

== League History ==
=== 2009 ===
Formed in 2009, 10 clubs applied and were accepted to be part of the new setup; Bangkok Christian College, Bangkok Bravo, Bangkok North Central ASSN, Kasetsart University, Kasem Bundit University, Rangsit University, Nakhon Sawan Rajabhat University, Raj Pracha-Nonthaburi, Raj-Vithi and Sarawitaya. Most of the clubs are linked closely to the city's universities.

Raj-Pracha re-grouped for the new setup and relocated to the Nonthaburi district on the outskirts of Bangkok and were accordingly renamed to give themselves closer ties to the area.

Most of the clubs did have previous experience in the Thai football league system, which went against the trend compared to the other regional divisions at this level.

Raj Pracha-Nonthaburi won the first ever championship and took the Regional League championship allocation, winning the division by 9 points. Raj-Pracha also went on to secure promotion to the Thai Division 1 League for the 2010 campaign after securing the Regional Championship title.

=== 2010 ===
The 2010 season saw the league expand to 13 clubs. Raj Pracha secured promotion in the previous campaign. In return, Look Isan-Thai Airways joined the league after relegation the 1st Division where they were then known as Thai Airways-Ban Bueng.

Rose Asia United Thanyaburi and Thai Summit Samut Prakan joined the league from the 'Central/East regional league. Nonthaburi and North Bangkok College joined the league during its expansion, whereas Sarawitaya withdrew after one campaign. In addition to this, Bangkok Bravo were renamed Bangkok and Rangsit University were renamed Rangsit University JW.

Bangkok went on to win the championship and entered the Regional League Championship stage along with runners up Rangsit University JW in a closely thought contest which saw only 7 points separate the top 6 sides.

Bangkok and Rangsit University JW fared poorly in the championship stage, both coming 4th in their respect groups, however this secured them both a place in the end of season Division 1 relegation playoffs, of which both won and secured promotion.

== Timeline ==
Year	Important events	Participating clubs
2009	1st ever Regional League Bangkok Area starts.; 5 clubs enter the FA Cup	10
2010	League expanded to 13 clubs; Thai Summit Samut Prakan and Rose Asia Pathum Thani reloceated from the Central East Division.; Thai Airways relegated from Division One	13
2011	League expanded to 16 clubs; Prachinburi relegated from Division One; Globlex, Maptaphut Rayong, Assumption College Thonburi, Royal Thai Fleet and Chamchuri United promoted from Khǒr Royal Cup; Bangkok North Central ASSN were effectively relegated from the division due to failure to meet Regional League standards; Thai Summit Samut Prakan renamed Samut Prakan United; Nakhon Sawan Rajabhat University renamed Paknampho NSRU; Rose Asia Pathum Thani renamed Thanyaburi RA United	16
2012	League expanded to 18 clubs; RBAC Mittraphap, Samut Prakan Customs United and Thai Honda relegated from Division One; Rangsit and Krung Thonburi promoted from Khǒr Royal Cup; Samut Sakhon relocated from the Regional League Central & Eastern Division; Central Lions(Bangkok North Central ASSN) returned from club serving ban one year; Maptaphut Rayong, Paknampho NSRU, Royal Thai Fleet and Thanyaburi United have all been moved into the Central & Eastern Division; Raj-Vithi have withdrawn from the 2012 campaign; RBAC Mittraphap renamed RBAC BEC Tero Sasana; Samut Prakan Customs United renamed Customs United; Prachinburi renamed Rayong United	18

== Championship History ==
#	Season	Winner	Runner up	Third place
1	2009	Raj Pracha-Nonthaburi	Kasem Bundit University	Bangkok North Central ASSN
2	2010	Bangkok	Rangsit University JW	Nonthaburi
3	2011	Kasetsart	North Bangkok College	Samut Prakan United
4	2012	Thai Honda	Rayong United	RBAC-BEC Tero Sasana
5	2013	Paknampho NSRU	Kasetsart	Bangkok Christian College
6	2014	Thai Honda	BCC Tero	Samut Prakan United
7	2015	Customs United	Chamchuri United	Assumption United
8	2016	Chamchuri United	Kasetsart	BU Deffo

== Member clubs ==
Club	Number of Seasons	Years (2009-2014)
Assumption United	4	2011, 2012, 2013, 2014
Bangkok	2	2009, 2010
BCC Tero	6	2009, 2010, 2011, 2012, 2013, 2014
Central Lions	3	2009, 2010, 2012
Chamchuri United	4	2011, 2012, 2013, 2014
Customs United	3	2012, 2013, 2014
Globlex	2	2011, 2012
Kasem Bundit University	6	2009, 2010, 2011, 2012, 2013, 2014
Kasetsart University	5	2009, 2010, 2011, 2012, 2013
Krung Thonburi	1	2012
Laem Chabang	1	2013
Maptaphut Rayong	1	2011
Nonthaburi	4	2010, 2011, 2012, 2013
North Bangkok College	5	2010, 2011, 2012, 2013, 2014
Paknampho NSRU	5	2009, 2010, 2011, 2013, 2014
Raj Pracha BTU	1	2009
Raj-Vithi	5	2009, 2010, 2011, 2013, 2014
Rayong United	3	2011, 2012, 2014
Rangsit	2	2012, 2014
Rangsit University	3	2009, 2010, 2014
RBAC BEC Tero Sasana	3	2012, 2013, 2014
Royal Thai Fleet	1	2011
Samut Prakan United	5	2010, 2011, 2012, 2013, 2014
Samut Sakhon	1	2012
Sarawitaya	1	2009
Thai Airways-Look Isan	3	2010, 2011, 2012
Thai Honda	3	2012, 2013, 2014
Thanyaburi United	2	2010, 2011
