= 2011 Thai FA Cup =

Tournament details
- Country: Thailand
- Dates: 20 April 2011-11 January 2012

Final positions
- Champions: Buriram PEA (1st title)
- Runners-up: Muangthong United

Tournament statistics
- Matches played: 74
- Top goal scorer(s): Manop Sornkaew; 6 goals

The Thai FA Cup 2011 (Thai: มูลนิธิไทยคม เอฟเอคัพ) is the 18th season of Thailand knockout football competition. The tournament is organized by the Football Association of Thailand.

The cup winner were guaranteed a place in the 2012 AFC Champions League.

== Calendar ==
Round	Date	Matches	Clubs	New entries this round
Qualifying round	20 April 2011	4	4 → 2	4
First round	20 April 2011; 27 April 2011; 11 May 2011; 25 May 2011	2 + 36	2 + 36 → 19	36
Second round	8 June 2011; 15 June 2011; 22 June 2011	19 + 17	19 + 17 → 18	17
Third round	9 July 2011; 10 July 2011; 16 July 2011; 17 July 2011; 20 July 2011; 27 July 2011; 17 August 2011; 16 October 2011	18 + 18	18 + 18 → 4 to Fourth Round and 14 to Fifth Round	18
Fourth round	4 September 2011; 26 October 2011	4	4 → 2	
Fifth round	27 August 2011; 28 August 2011; 31 August 2011; 19 October 2011; 26 October 2011	2 + 14	2 + 14 → 8	
Quarter-finals	4 January 2012	8	8 → 4	
Semi-finals	7 January 2012	4	4 → 2	
Final	11 January 2012	2	2 → 1	

== Qualifying round ==
Team 1	Score	Team 2
20 April 2011
Sananrak Municipality	0–2	Prachinburi
Wongchawalitkul University Alumni Association	1 – 1 (3 – 5 p)	Ang Thong

Prachinburi won because Sananrak Municipality disqualified

== First round ==
Team 1	Score	Team 2
20 April 2011
Nonthaburi	1–2	Muangkan
Pattaya 8 School	0–1	Nakhon Ratchasima sports school
27 April 2011
Royal Thai Fleet	4–2	Chamchuri United
Sa Kaeo City	1–2	Samut Prakan United
Yasothon United	3–1	Nakhon Ratchasima
Roi Et United	0 – 0 (6 – 5 p)	Pataya province
Bangkok Christian College	1 – 1 (5 – 3 p)	Tak
Phitsanulok	4–0	Uthai Thani Forest
11 May 2011
Loei City	2–0	Ratchaphruek College
Ranong	0 – 0 (5 – 4 p)	Kamphaeng Phet
Uttaradit Mhorseng	1 – 1 (4 – 5 p)	Krabi
Phetchaburi	0–1	Kasetsart University
25 May 2011
Prachinburi	2–1	Ang Thong
F.C. Korat	3–2	Trang
Globlex	2–1	Maptaphut Rayong
Samut Sakhon	6–0	Center of kind School
Samut Prakan	4–0	Thumrong Thai
Rayong	3–2	Ayutthaya
Ratchaburi	(w/o) ^{1}	Mukdahan City

^{1} Ratchaburi won because Mukdahan City withdrew

== Second round ==
Team 1	Score	Team 2
8 June 2011
PTT Rayong	2–1	Saraburi
Songkhla	(w/o) ^{2}	Yasothon United
Samut Prakan United	1–0	Samut Prakan Customs United
Ratchaburi	2 – 2 (5 – 6 p)	BBCU
Nakhon Ratchasima Sports School	0–1	Chanthaburi
Kasetsart University	2–0	Globlex
15 June 2011
Krabi	1–0	Chiangmai
F.C. Phuket	7–3	Bangkok Christian College
Samut Prakan	1–0	Prachinburi
Loei City	1 – 1 (5 – 4 p)	Suphanburi
Chainat	3–1	Royal Thai Fleet
F.C. Korat	0–4	Raj-Pracha
22 June 2011
Phitsanulok	1–0	J.W. Rangsit
Air Force United	0–2	Buriram
Roi Et United	1 – 1 (4 – 5 p)	Samut Sakhon
Ranong	0–1	RBAC Mittraphap
Muangkan	0 – 0 (7 – 6 p)	Bangkok
Rayong	2 – 1 ( ET)	Bangkok United

^{2} Songkhla won because Yasothon United withdrew
^{3} Thai Honda withdrew before lots of Second round.

== Third round ==
Team 1	Score	Team 2
9 July 2011
Samut Songkhram	1 – 1 (5 – 3 p)	Chanthaburi
Osotspa Saraburi	0–3	Police United
10 July 2011
Muangthong United (RC)	9–0	Samut Prakan United
Buriram PEA	2 – 1 ( ET)	PTT Rayong
TTM Phichit	1–5	Chonburi (C)
Rayong	2 – 2 (4 – 5 p)	BEC Tero Sasana
16 July 2011
Pattaya United	4–0	Khonkaen
17 July 2011
Raj-Pracha	0–2	Sisaket
Siam Navy	1–2	Chiangrai United
20 July 2011
Kasetsart University	0–3	BBCU
Sriracha	1–0	Phitsanulok
Samut Prakan	0–3	Chainat
TOT SC	1–0	F.C. Phuket
27 July 2011
Samut Sakhon	3–5	Songkhla
RBAC Mittraphap	0–1	Loei City
Muangkan	2–3	Krabi
17 August 2011
Army United	2–1	Buriram
19 October 2011
Thai Port	0–2	Bangkok Glass

^{4} (C) is Champion in last season.
^{5} (RC) is Runner-up in last season.

== Fourth round ==
Team 1	Score	Team 2
4 September 2011
Songkhla	4–1	Krabi
26 October 2011
Muangthong United (RC)	1 – 1; 5–4 Pens	Bangkok Glass

== Fifth round ==
Team 1	Score	Team 2
27 August 2011
Sriracha	1–0	BBCU
28 August 2011
Chiangrai United	0 – 0 (3 – 4 p)	Chainat
31 August 2011
Samut Songkhram	0 – 0 (2 – 4 p)	Loei City
19 October 2011
TOT SC	1–4	Songkhla
26 October 2011
Army United	2–1	Chonburi (C)
Police United	(w/o) ^{1}	Buriram PEA
30 November 2011
BEC Tero Sasana	2–1	Sisaket
Pattaya United	0–6	Muangthong United (RC)

^{1} Police United failed to turn up for their game.

== Quarter-finals ==
Team 1	Score	Team 2
4 January 2012
Muangthong United (RC)	4–0	Sriracha
Buriram PEA	2–0	BEC Tero Sasana
Loei City	0–4	Songkhla
5 January 2012^{∗}
Army United	1 – 1 (5 – 4 p)	Chainat

∗The original schedule was January 4 but postponed due to weather condition (heavy rain).

== Semi-finals ==
Team 1	Score	Team 2
7 January 2012
Buriram PEA	2–0	Army United
Songkhla	2 – 2 (3 – 4 p)	Muangthong United (RC)

== Final ==
Team 1	Score	Team 2
11 January 2012
Buriram PEA	1 – 0 ( ET)	Muangthong United (RC)
