= 2023–24 Thai League 3 Bangkok Metropolitan Region =

Thai League 3 Bangkok Metropolitan Region
- Season: 2023–24
- Dates: 16 September 2023 – 25 February 2024
- Champions: Bangkok
- Relegated: The iCON RSU
- T3 National Championship: Bangkok; North Bangkok University
- Matches: 182
- Goals: 543 (2.98 per match)
- Top goalscorer: (Brazil) Carlos Eduardo dos Santos Lima (14 goals; Bangkok)
- Best goalkeeper: (Thailand) Sanan Amkoed (11 clean sheets; North Bangkok University)
- Biggest home win: 6 goals difference Kasem Bundit University 6–0 Samut Prakan (11 November 2023); Prime Bangkok 6–0 The iCON RSU (21 January 2024); Prime Bangkok 7–1 AUU Inter Bangkok (3 February 2024)
- Biggest away win: 8 goals difference The iCON RSU 0–8 Prime Bangkok (28 October 2023)
- Highest scoring: 9 goals Royal Thai Air Force 4–5 Bangkok (26 November 2023)
- Longest winning run: 11 matches Bangkok
- Longest unbeaten run: 24 matches Bangkok
- Longest winless run: 20 matches Nonthaburi United
- Longest losing run: 5 matches Chamchuri United

The 2023–24 Thai League 3 Bangkok Metropolitan region is a region in the regional stage of the 2023–24 Thai League 3. The tournament was sponsored by Rising Sun fertilizer, and known as the Rising Sun Fertilizer League for sponsorship purposes. A total of 14 teams located in Central and Bangkok metropolitan region of Thailand will compete in the league of the Bangkok Metropolitan region.

== Changes from last season ==
=== Promotion or relegation ===
Team	League		Notes
Team	Previous season	Current season	Notes
From Thai League 3
Siam (substituted off)	Thai League 3	Thailand Semi-pro League	
To Thai League 3
The iCON RSU (substituted on)	Thailand Semi-pro League	Thai League 3	

=== Renaming ===
Team	Old name	Current name
Nonthaburi United	Nonthaburi United S.Boonmeerit F.C.	Nonthaburi United F.C.
VRN Muangnont	STK Muangnont F.C.	VRN Muangnont F.C.

== Teams ==
=== Number of teams by province ===
Position	Province	Number	Teams
1	Bangkok	8	AUU Inter Bangkok, Bangkok, Chamchuri United, Kasem Bundit University, Prime Bangkok, Royal Thai Army, The iCON RSU, and Thonburi United
2	Nonthaburi	2	Nonthaburi United and VRN Muangnont
2	Pathum Thani	2	North Bangkok University and Royal Thai Air Force
4	Samut Prakan	1	Samut Prakan
4	Samut Sakhon	1	Samut Sakhon City

=== Stadiums and locations ===
Locations of the 2023–24 Thai League 3 Bangkok Metropolitan region teams

Team	Location	Stadium	Coordinates
AUU Inter Bangkok	Bangkok (Min Buri)	72nd Anniversary Stadium, Min Buri	13°48′08″N 100°47′28″E
Bangkok	Bangkok (Thung Khru)	72nd Anniversary Stadium, Bang Mot	13°38′48″N 100°29′34″E
Chamchuri United	Bangkok (Pathum Wan)	Stadium of Chulalongkorn University	13°44′14″N 100°31′33″E
Kasem Bundit University	Bangkok (Min Buri)	Stadium of Kasem Bundit University	13°48′06″N 100°44′06″E
Nonthaburi United	Nonthaburi (Bang Yai)	Nonthaburi Stadium	13°51′03″N 100°26′28″E
North Bangkok University	Pathum Thani (Thanyaburi)	Stadium of North Bangkok University	14°00′22″N 100°40′24″E
Prime Bangkok	Bangkok (Bang Kapi)	Stadium of Ramkhamhaeng University	13°45′16″N 100°37′00″E
Royal Thai Air Force	Pathum Thani (Lam Luk Ka)	Dhupatemiya Stadium	13°57′04″N 100°37′30″E
Royal Thai Army	Bangkok (Thawi Watthana)	Stadium of Bangkokthonburi University	13°46′09″N 100°20′44″E
Samut Prakan	Samut Prakan (Bang Sao Thong)	Samut Prakan Stadium	13°34′45″N 100°47′41″E
Samut Sakhon City	Samut Sakhon (Mueang)	Stadium of Thailand National Sports University, Samut Sakhon Campus	13°32′30″N 100°16′52″E
The iCON RSU	Pathum Thani (Thanyaburi)	Bangkok University Stadium	14°01′41″N 100°43′34″E
Thonburi United	Bangkok (Nong Khaem)	Thonburi Stadium	13°43′28″N 100°20′43″E
VRN Muangnont	Nonthaburi (Mueang)	Nonthaburi City Municipality Stadium	13°52′44″N 100°32′39″E

Locations of teams in Bangkok Metropolitan region

=== Foreign players ===
A T3 team could register 3 foreign players from foreign players all around the world. A team can use 3 foreign players on the field in each game.

Note :
(substituted off) : players who released during second leg transfer window;
(substituted on) : players who registered during second leg transfer window.

AFC member countries players.
CAF member countries players.
CONCACAF member countries players.
CONMEBOL member countries players.
OFC member countries players.
UEFA member countries players.
No foreign player registered.

Club	Leg	Player 1	Player 2	Player 3
AUU Inter Bangkok	1st			(Ghana) Sarfo Otis Adjei (substituted off)
AUU Inter Bangkok	2nd	(Uruguay) Diego Silva (substituted on)	(Turkey) Ali Alakabak (substituted on)	(Iran) Ahmadi Joupari Ali (substituted on)
Bangkok	1st	(Japan) Goshi Okubo (substituted off)	(Brazil) Carlos Eduardo dos Santos Lima	(Japan) Seiya Kojima
Bangkok	2nd	(Brazil) Eydison (substituted on)	(Brazil) Carlos Eduardo dos Santos Lima	(Japan) Seiya Kojima
Chamchuri United	1st
Chamchuri United	2nd
Kasem Bundit University	1st	(Nigeria) Chinonso Kingsley Thomas	(Nigeria) Ademola Sodiq Adeyemi	(Nigeria) Raoul Uche Nduka
Kasem Bundit University	2nd	(Nigeria) Chinonso Kingsley Thomas	(Nigeria) Ademola Sodiq Adeyemi	(Nigeria) Raoul Uche Nduka
Nonthaburi United	1st		(Ivory Coast) Joseph Louis Kissi	(Guinea) Diop Badara Aly
Nonthaburi United	2nd	(South Korea) Seo Min-guk (substituted on)	(Ivory Coast) Joseph Louis Kissi	(Guinea) Diop Badara Aly
North Bangkok University	1st	(Brazil) Thiago Duchatsch (substituted off)	(Nigeria) Aliu Micheal Abdul (substituted off)	(South Korea) Kim Seong-soo
North Bangkok University	2nd	(Ivory Coast) Mohamed Kouadio (substituted on)	(Japan) Kazuki Murakami (substituted on)	(South Korea) Kim Seong-soo
Prime Bangkok	1st	(Ivory Coast) Bouda Henry Ismaël (substituted off)	(South Korea) Cho Woo-hyuk (substituted off)	(Sweden) Lars William Kvist
Prime Bangkok	2nd	(Sweden) Alexander Philip Dominic Tkacz (substituted on)	(Palestine) Assad Al Hamlawi (substituted on)	(Sweden) Lars William Kvist
Royal Thai Air Force	1st	(England) Karam Idris (substituted off)	(Ghana) Emmanuel Kwame Akadom
Royal Thai Air Force	2nd	(Ghana) Sah Benjamin (substituted on)	(Ghana) Emmanuel Kwame Akadom
Royal Thai Army	1st
Royal Thai Army	2nd
Samut Prakan	1st	(Argentina) Lucas Daniel Echenique (substituted off)	(South Korea) Thomas Se-hyun Nelson (substituted off)	(South Korea) Kim Se-jin
Samut Prakan	2nd	(Brazil) Luan Borges Machado Martins (substituted on)	(Australia) Nicholas Edward Boyd (substituted on)	(South Korea) Kim Se-jin
Samut Sakhon City	1st	(Cameroon) Alex Mermoz Djatche Nandje (substituted off)	(Cameroon) Cedrick Platini Kaham (substituted off)	(Ivory Coast) Bireme Diouf
Samut Sakhon City	2nd	(Brazil) Welington Adão Cruz (substituted on)	(Brazil) Carlos (substituted on)	(Ivory Coast) Bireme Diouf
The iCON RSU	1st	(Iran) Ahmadi Joupari Ali (substituted off)	(Iran) Taleshi Peyman (substituted off)	(Ghana) Joseph Amenyo
The iCON RSU	2nd	(Iran) Ehsan Rajabi Jalil (substituted on)	(South Korea) Ma Ye-sung (substituted on)	(Ghana) Joseph Amenyo
Thonburi United	1st	(Germany) Flodyn Ruchelvy Ulrich Baloki (substituted off)	(Argentina) Ramiro Lizaso	(Nigeria) Bright Friday
Thonburi United	2nd	(Japan) Hideto Ozaki (substituted on)	(Argentina) Ramiro Lizaso	(Nigeria) Bright Friday
VRN Muangnont	1st
VRN Muangnont	2nd	(Egypt) Sherif Ahmed Mostafa Saleh (substituted on)	(Japan) Kasahara Keito (substituted on)

== League table ==
=== Standings ===
Pos	Team	Pld	W	D	L	GF	GA	GD	Pts	Qualification or relegation
1	Bangkok (C, Q)	26	18	7	1	59	19	+40	61	Qualification to the National Championship stage
2	North Bangkok University (Q)	26	17	6	3	44	17	+27	57	Qualification to the National Championship stage
3	Samut Sakhon City	26	17	5	4	65	21	+44	56 (Note: Samut Sakhon City ahead on head-to-head points record; Samut Sakhon City 4 pts, Thonburi United 1 pt.)	
4	Thonburi United	26	17	5	4	56	32	+24	56	
5	Kasem Bundit University	26	16	4	6	64	19	+45	52	
6	Prime Bangkok	26	13	9	4	52	23	+29	48	
7	Royal Thai Air Force	26	8	6	12	41	47	−6	30	
8	Chamchuri United	26	6	8	12	28	41	−13	26	
9	Royal Thai Army	26	5	6	15	27	59	−32	21 (Note: Royal Thai Army ahead on head-to-head points record; Royal Thai Army 4 pts, VRN Muangnont 1 pt.)	
10	VRN Muangnont	26	4	9	13	18	35	−17	21	
11	AUU Inter Bangkok	26	4	8	14	24	49	−25	20 (Note: AUU Inter Bangkok is ahead on the head-to-head record; AUU Inter Bangkok 3 pts (GD +1), Samut Prakan 3 pts (GD -1).)	
12	Samut Prakan	26	5	5	16	20	59	−39	20	
13	Nonthaburi United	26	3	8	15	26	50	−24	17	
14	The iCON RSU (R)	26	4	4	18	19	72	−53	16	Relegation to the Thailand Semi-pro League

Source: Thai League
Rules for classification: 1) Points; 2) Head-to-head points; 3) Head-to-head goal difference; 4) Head-to-head goal scored; 5) Overall goal difference; 6) Overall goal scored; 7) Fair play points; 8) Play-off without extra time).
(C) Champions; (Q) Qualified for the phase indicated; (R) Relegated

=== Positions by round ===
Team ╲ Round	1	2	3	4	5	6	7	8	9	10	11	12	13	14	15	16	17	18	19	20	21	22	23	24	25	26
Bangkok	6	5	2	2	2	1	1	1	1	1	1	1	1	1	1	1	1	1	1	1	1	1	1	1	1	1
North Bangkok University	7	9	8	8	7	6	7	6	5	4	3	3	3	3	3	3	3	4	4	3	3	2	2	2	2	2
Samut Sakhon City	5	3	7	4	3	4	2	2	3	3	4	4	4	4	4	4	4	2	2	2	4	3	3	3	3	3
Thonburi United	3	6	4	3	4	3	3	3	2	2	2	2	2	2	2	2	2	3	3	4	2	4	4	4	4	4
Kasem Bundit University	2	1	1	1	1	2	4	4	4	5	5	5	5	5	5	5	5	5	5	5	5	5	5	5	5	5
Prime Bangkok	10	7	6	7	5	5	5	5	6	6	6	6	6	6	6	6	6	6	6	6	6	6	6	6	6	6
Royal Thai Air Force	12	13	14	13	10	11	12	10	8	8	8	8	7	7	8	8	8	7	7	7	7	7	7	7	7	7
Chamchuri United	4	4	3	6	8	9	6	7	7	7	7	7	8	8	7	7	7	8	8	8	8	8	8	8	8	8
Royal Thai Army	11	12	9	10	12	12	13	13	13	13	13	13	13	13	11	12	11	12	12	9	9	9	10	11	9	9
VRN Muangnont	9	11	11	11	9	8	9	9	9	10	11	11	11	12	13	10	10	11	11	12	12	10	11	12	12	10
AUU Inter Bangkok	1	2	5	5	6	7	8	8	11	9	9	9	9	10	10	9	9	9	10	10	10	11	12	9	10	11
Samut Prakan	8	10	13	12	13	13	11	12	12	12	12	12	12	9	9	11	12	10	9	11	11	12	9	10	11	12
Nonthaburi United	14	14	12	14	14	14	14	14	14	14	14	14	14	14	14	14	14	14	14	14	14	14	14	14	14	13
The iCON RSU	13	8	10	9	11	10	10	11	10	11	10	10	10	11	12	13	13	13	13	13	13	13	13	13	13	14

Source: Thai League
= Qualification to the National Championship stage; = Relegation to the Thailand Semi-pro League

=== Results by round ===
Team ╲ Round	1	2	3	4	5	6	7	8	9	10	11	12	13	14	15	16	17	18	19	20	21	22	23	24	25	26
Bangkok	D	W	W	W	W	W	W	W	W	W	W	W	D	W	W	D	D	D	W	D	W	W	W	W	L	D
North Bangkok University	D	L	W	D	W	D	L	W	W	W	W	W	W	W	W	W	W	L	D	W	W	W	W	D	W	D
Samut Sakhon City	W	W	L	W	W	L	W	W	L	D	D	W	W	W	W	W	W	D	D	W	L	W	W	W	W	D
Thonburi United	W	L	W	W	L	W	W	W	W	D	W	W	D	D	W	W	W	L	D	W	W	L	W	W	W	D
Kasem Bundit University	W	W	W	W	D	L	D	L	W	L	D	W	D	W	L	W	W	W	W	L	W	L	W	W	W	W
Prime Bangkok	L	W	W	L	W	D	W	L	D	D	D	D	W	D	W	L	D	W	W	D	W	W	W	W	W	D
Royal Thai Air Force	L	L	L	D	W	L	D	W	W	W	L	L	W	L	L	L	W	W	L	D	W	D	L	D	L	D
Chamchuri United	W	W	D	L	L	D	W	D	L	W	L	D	D	L	W	D	L	L	D	D	L	L	L	L	L	W
Royal Thai Army	L	L	W	L	L	D	L	D	L	L	D	L	L	W	W	L	D	D	D	W	L	L	L	L	W	L
VRN Muangnont	D	L	L	D	W	W	L	D	D	L	L	L	D	L	L	W	L	D	D	L	L	D	L	L	D	W
AUU Inter Bangkok	W	W	L	D	D	L	L	D	L	D	D	D	L	L	L	W	L	D	L	D	L	L	L	W	L	L
Samut Prakan	D	L	L	D	L	D	W	L	L	W	D	L	L	W	L	L	L	W	D	L	L	L	W	L	L	L
Nonthaburi United	L	L	D	L	L	D	L	L	L	L	D	L	D	L	L	L	L	D	D	D	W	W	L	L	D	W
The iCON RSU	L	W	L	D	L	W	L	L	W	L	D	D	L	L	L	L	D	L	L	L	L	W	L	L	L	L

Source: Thai League
W = Won; D = Drawn; L = Lost

=== Results ===
Home \ Away	AIB	BKK	CCU	KBU	NON	NBU	PBK	AIR	ARM	SPK	SKC	ICR	TBU	VMN
AUU Inter Bangkok	—	1–5	1–1	0–3	0–4	0–2	1–1	1–1	1–2	2–0	1–1	2–1	2–4	0–2
Bangkok	3–0	—	4–1	2–0	3–1	0–0	1–1	2–0	4–0	4–0	1–1	3–0	1–1	3–1
Chamchuri United	0–0	1–1	—	1–1	0–0	2–1	1–1	0–3	1–0	1–2	0–3	0–1	2–3	1–0
Kasem Bundit University	1–1	0–1	2–1	—	4–1	0–1	2–1	3–0	0–0	6–0	2–0	5–1	5–1	3–0
Nonthaburi United	0–5	0–2	2–5	0–5	—	0–2	1–2	0–1	1–1	3–1	1–1	0–1	1–2	1–1
North Bangkok University	1–0	1–1	2–0	2–0	2–1	—	1–2	2–0	3–0	4–3	2–1	2–1	0–1	2–0
Prime Bangkok	7–1	1–2	2–1	0–2	1–1	0–0	—	2–1	1–1	1–0	1–1	6–0	1–0	1–0
Royal Thai Air Force	0–1	4–5	2–0	1–1	3–3	1–1	1–3	—	3–2	4–0	0–2	2–1	1–1	3–1
Royal Thai Army	3–2	1–3	0–1	0–3	1–1	1–4	1–4	3–2	—	2–3	0–5	2–0	1–3	2–1
Samut Prakan	1–0	0–3	1–1	1–4	1–0	1–1	0–2	0–1	1–1	—	0–6	0–0	0–3	0–0
Samut Sakhon City	2–0	1–2	4–3	1–0	3–1	1–2	1–0	5–2	5–1	2–0	—	4–0	0–0	3–1
The iCON RSU	0–0	2–2	2–4	0–5	1–2	0–3	0–8	3–2	2–1	1–5	0–7	—	1–2	0–0
Thonburi United	3–1	1–0	3–0	3–2	2–1	1–1	2–2	5–3	4–0	5–0	1–4	2–0	—	2–1
VRN Muangnont	1–1	0–1	0–0	0–5	0–0	0–2	1–1	0–0	1–1	2–0	0–1	3–1	2–1	—

Source: Thai League
Legend: Blue = home team win; Yellow = draw; Red = away team win.
For upcoming matches, an "a" indicates there is an article about the rivalry between the two participants.

== Season statistics ==
=== Top scorers ===
As of 24 February 2024.

Rank	Player	Club	Goals
1	(Brazil) Dudu Lima	Bangkok	14
2	(Thailand) Wichaya Pornprasart	Bangkok	12
2	(Nigeria) Thomas Chinonso	Kasem Bundit University	12
2	(Thailand) Chawanwit Saelao	Prime Bangkok	12
5	(Brazil) Wellington Adão	Samut Sakhon City (11 Goals)	11
5	(Nigeria) Bright Friday	Thonburi United	11

=== Hat-tricks ===
Player	For	Against	Result	Date
(Thailand) Chayaphon Phanwiset	AUU Inter Bangkok	Nonthaburi United	0–5 (A)	16 September 2023
(Argentina) Ramiro Lizaso	Thonburi United	Kasem Bundit University	3–2 (H)	21 October 2023
(Iran) Ahmadi Joupari Ali	The iCon RSU	Royal Thai Air Force	3–2 (H)	22 October 2023
(Thailand) Chawanwit Saelao	Prime Bangkok	The iCon RSU	0–8 (A)	28 October 2023
(Nigeria) Raoul Uche Nduka^{4}	Kasem Bundit University	Samut Prakan	6–0 (H)	11 November 2023
(Thailand) Sirichai Lamphuttha	Samut Sakhon City	Royal Thai Air Force	5–2 (H)	16 December 2023
(Brazil) Wellington Adão	Samut Sakhon City	Royal Thai Army	0–5 (A)	7 January 2024
(Sweden) Lars William Kvist	Prime Bangkok	The iCon RSU	6–0 (H)	21 January 2024
(Sweden) Assad Al Hamlawi	Prime Bangkok	AUU Inter Bangkok	7–1 (H)	3 February 2024
(Brazil) Luan Borges	Samut Prakan	The iCon RSU	1–5 (A)	7 February 2024

Notes: ^{4} = Player scored 4 goals; (H) = Home team; (A) = Away team

=== Clean sheets ===
As of 24 February 2024.

Rank	Player	Club	Clean sheets
1	(Thailand) Sanan Amkoed	North Bangkok University	11
2	(Thailand) Suntiparp Boonlkilang	Samut Sakhon City	8
2	(Thailand) Pattarapong Patcharoon	Thonburi United	8
4	(Thailand) Chaiyapat Honbanleng	VRN Muangnont	6
5	(Thailand) Chitchana Tuksinpila	Kasem Bundit University	5
5	(Thailand) Yutthasit Chatmueang	Prime Bangkok	5
5	(Thailand) Wichanon Chomchuen	Royal Thai Air Force	5

== Attendances ==
=== Overall statistical table ===
Pos	Team	Total	High	Low	Average	Change
1	Bangkok	8,350	1,000	450	642	+61.7%
2	Prime Bangkok	4,600	790	80	354	+42.7%
3	Samut Sakhon City	3,661	419	120	282	−11.0%
4	Thonburi United	3,518	575	117	271	+4.6%
5	Kasem Bundit University	2,759	310	122	212	+50.4%
6	Chamchuri United	2,735	400	120	210	+8.8%
7	Royal Thai Air Force	2,513	396	0	209	+23.7%
8	Royal Thai Army	2,239	285	112	172	−8.5%
9	North Bangkok University	2,114	356	110	163	−6.3%
10	VRN Muangnont	1,878	285	0	157	−19.1%
11	The iCon RSU	1,501	284	0	150	n/a
12	Nonthaburi United	1,620	300	0	147	−0.7%
13	AUU Inter Bangkok	1,537	200	0	128	−5.2%
14	Samut Prakan	1,341	177	41	103	−33.1%
	League total	40,366	1,000	0	229	+12.3%

Updated to games played on 25 February 2024
Source: Thai League

=== Attendances by home match played ===
Team \ Match played	1	2	3	4	5	6	7	8	9	10	11	12	13	Total
AUU Inter Bangkok	163	32	104	200	186	130	100	90	150	200	100	82	Unk.7	1,537
Bangkok	500	500	600	600	500	800	750	550	800	800	500	450	1,000	8,350
Chamchuri United	250	220	250	220	250	150	250	400	205	120	150	150	120	2,735
Kasem Bundit University	300	300	200	200	200	150	250	198	150	200	310	179	122	2,759
Nonthaburi United	150	150	200	130	110	78	130	100	Unk.2	Unk.5	150	122	300	1,620
North Bangkok University	205	120	120	120	320	180	110	130	110	110	120	113	356	2,114
Prime Bangkok	590	390	305	425	220	280	220	80	260	240	320	480	790	4,600
Royal Thai Air Force	396	186	221	189	143	225	235	155	154	208	199	202	Unk.8	2,513
Royal Thai Army	165	185	185	165	220	184	165	142	285	172	135	112	124	2,239
Samut Prakan	137	103	81	141	72	44	110	67	150	72	41	177	146	1,341
Samut Sakhon City	419	355	340	288	309	350	120	185	170	350	270	155	350	3,661
The iCon RSU	120	212	200	Unk.1	128	100	284	100	Unk.3	Unk.6	120	60	177	1,501
Thonburi United	320	263	225	327	117	157	327	227	175	250	327	228	575	3,518
VRN Muangnont	145	250	150	160	127	135	90	152	Unk.4	120	114	285	150	1,878

Note:
Unk.1 Some error of T3 official match report 28 October 2023 (The iCon RSU 0–8 Prime Bangkok).
Unk.2 Some error of T3 official match report 10 January 2024 (Nonthaburi United 0–2 North Bangkok University).
Unk.3 Some error of T3 official match report 10 January 2024 (The iCon RSU 2–2 Bangkok).
Unk.4 Some error of T3 official match report 14 January 2024 (VRN Muangnont 1–1 AUU Inter Bangkok).
Unk.5 Some error of T3 official match report 20 January 2024 (Nonthaburi United 1–1 Samut Sakhon City).
Unk.6 Some error of T3 official match report 27 January 2024 (The iCon RSU 1–2 Thonburi United).
Unk.7 Some error of T3 official match report 25 February 2024 (AUU Inter Bangkok 0–4 Nonthaburi United).
Unk.8 Some error of T3 official match report 25 February 2024 (Royal Thai Air Force 1–1 Thonburi United).
