= 2010 Regional League Division 2 Bangkok Metropolitan Region =

Regional League Bangkok Area Division
- Season: 2010
- Champions: Bangkok; 1st Title
- Matches: 156
- Goals: 410 (2.63 per match)
- Biggest home win: North Bangkok College 5–0 Rose Asia United Thanyaburi (21 February 2010); Bangkok 7–2 Kasetsart University (30 May 2010)
- Biggest away win: Rose Asia United Thanyaburi 1–6 Bangkok (27 June 2010)
- Highest scoring: Bangkok 7–2 Kasetsart University (30 May 2010); Rose Asia United Thanyaburi 3–6 Kasem Bundit University (30 May 2010) (9 goals)

2010 Regional League Division 2 Bangkok Metropolitan Region is the 2nd season of the League competition since its establishment in 2009. It is in the third tier of the Thai football league system.

The league has been expanded from 10 clubs in 2009 to 13 clubs this season. The league winners and runners up will qualify for the 2010 Regional League Division 2 championship stage.

== Changes from last season ==
=== Team changes ===
==== Promoted clubs ====
Raj Pracha-Nonthaburi were promoted to the 2010 Thai Division 1 League after winning the 2009 Regional League Division 2 championship pool.

==== Relegated clubs ====
Thai Airways-Look Isan were relegated from the 2009 Thai Division 1 League after finishing the season in 15th place.

==== Relocated clubs ====
Thai Summit Samut Prakan and Rose Asia Pathum Thani re-located from the Regional League Central-East Division 2009

==== Renamed clubs ====
- Bangkok Bravo renamed Bangkok.
- Thai Airways-Ban Bueng renamed Look Isan-Thai Airways.
- Rangsit University renamed Rangsit University JW.
- Rose Asia Pathum Thani renamed Rose Asia United Thanyaburi.
- Thai Summit renamed Thai Summit Samut Prakan.

==== Expansion clubs ====
Nonthaburi and North Bangkok College joined the newly expanded league setup.

==== Removed clubs ====
Sarawitaya dropped out of the league at the end of the 2009 campaign.

== Stadium and locations ==
Locations of the 2010 Regional League Division 2 Bangkok Metro teams
Football clubs in Bangkok Metropolitan Region

Team	Location	Stadium	Capacity	Ref.
Bangkok Christian College	Pathum Wan, Bangkok	Thephasadin Stadium	6,738	
Bangkok	Thung Khru, Bangkok	72-years Anniversary Stadium (Bang Mod)	8,126	
Kasem Bundit University	Min Buri, Bangkok; Min Buri, Bangkok; Lat Krabang, Bangkok	Kasem Bundit University Stadium (Rom Klao) 72nd Anniversary Stadium (Min buri) King Mongkut's Institute of Technology Ladkrabang Stadium	2,000; 10,000; 3,500	
Kasetsart University	Chatuchak, Bangkok	Insee Chantarasatit Stadium	3,275	
Look Isan-Thai Airways	Bang Kapi, Bangkok	Ramkhamhaeng University Stadium	?	
Nonthaburi	Nonthaburi	Nonthaburi Youth Centre Stadium	6,000	
North Bangkok College	Bangkok; Pathum Thani; Bangkok; Pathum Thani	Infantry Department 11 Royal Guard (1) Thanarom Village Football Field (2); 72nd Anniversary Stadium (Min buri) (3); Bangkok University Stadium (4)	? ? 8,500; 5,000	
North-Central	Min Buri, Bangkok	72nd Anniversary Stadium (Min buri)	8,500	
Nakhon Sawan Rajabhat University	Nakhon Sawan	Nakhon Sawan Sports School Stadium	2000	
Raj-Vithi	Din Daeng, Bangkok Nong Chok, Bangkok	Thai-Japanese Stadium BEC Tero Sasana Nong Chok Stadium	6,600; 5,000	
Rangsit University-JW	Pathum Thani	Rangsit University Stadium Bangkok University Stadium	? 5,000	
Thai Summit-Samut Prakan	Samut Prakan	Samut Prakarn SAT Stadium (Keha Bang Phli)	?	
Rose Asia United Thanyaburi	Pathum Thani	Chaloem Phra Kiat Stadium (Khlong 6)	?	

== Final league table ==
Pos	Team	Pld	W	D	L	GF	GA	GD	Pts	Qualification
1	Bangkok (C)	24	14	6	4	49	18	+31	48	Champions League Round
2	Rangsit University JW	24	13	7	4	29	14	+15	46	Champions League Round
3	Nonthaburi	24	13	7	4	35	23	+12	46	
4	Raj-Vithi	24	15	1	8	41	33	+8	46	
5	North Bangkok College	24	13	6	5	41	28	+13	45	
6	Bangkok Christian College	24	11	8	5	34	20	+14	41	
7	Thai Summit-Samut Prakan	24	10	4	10	30	26	+4	34	
8	Kasem Bundit University	24	7	8	9	40	40	0	29	
9	Look Isan-Thai Airways	24	7	6	11	24	36	−12	27	
10	Nakhon Sawan Rajabhat University	24	6	6	12	33	41	−8	24	
11	Kasetsart University	24	4	5	15	20	39	−19	17	
12	North-Central	24	2	7	15	17	41	−24	13 (Note: BNC 1–1 RAU; RAU 0–0 BNC)	
13	Rose Asia United Thanyaburi	24	2	7	15	17	51	−34	13	

Rules for classification: 1) points; 2) head-to-head points; 3) head-to-head goal difference; 4) head-to-head goals scored; 5) goal difference; 6) number of goals scored.
(C) Champions

== Results ==
Home \ Away	BKK	BCC	BNC	KBU	KST	NSR	NNB	RVT	RUJ	RAU	TAL	TSS	NBC
Bangkok		0–1	3–1	1–1	7–2	4–0	2–1	3–1	2–0	1–0	3–1	0–0	0–1
Bangkok Christian College	1–1		0–0	3–1	1–0	2–0	2–2	1–2	1–3	4–0	4–1	2–3	1–0
North-Central	0–3	0–1		1–0	2–1	2–3	0–0	0–1	0–0	1–1	1–2	3–5	0–1
Kasem Bundit University	2–2	1–1	3–0		3–2	3–1	1–1	0–2	1–4	1–0	1–1	1–3	4–1
Kasetsart University	1–2	0–0	1–0	2–2		0–0	1–2	0–1	2–1	1–1	1–2	0–0	0–1
Nakhon Sawan Rajabhat University	1–1	0–2	1–1	3–3	3–0		1–2	6–2	1–1	5–1	1–0	1–0	1–1
Nonthaburi	1–0	1–0	2–0	3–1	1–0	3–1		4–3	0–1	2–2	2–0	2–1	0–2
Raj-Vithi	0–3	2–2	3–1	1–0	1–0	2–1	0–1		0–2	2–1	4–1	1–0	3–4
Rangsit University JW	0–1	0–0	1–0	2–1	1–0	1–0	1–1	1–0		1–1	0–0	1–0	0–0
Rose Asia United Thanyaburi	1–6	0–1	0–0	3–6	1–2	2–0	0–1	0–3	1–4		1–1	1–0	0–1
Thai Airways-Look Isan	1–0	0–0	2–2	0–2	3–1	2–1	3–2	2–4	1–2	0–0		0–1	0–1
Thai Summit-Samut Prakan	0–3	0–2	1–0	2–1	1–2	3–0	0–0	0–1	1–0	3–0	2–0		2–3
North Bangkok College	1–1	3–2	6–2	1–1	3–1	3–3	1–1	0–2	0–2	5–0	0–1	2–2	

Updated to match(es) played on unknown. Source: Football Association of Thailand website
Legend: Blue = home team win; Yellow = draw; Red = away team win.
