= 2019 Thai League 4 Bangkok Metropolitan Region =

Thai League 4 Bangkok Metropolitan Region
- Season: 2019
- Dates: 9 February 2019 – 31 August 2019
- Champions: SCG Muangthong United (B)
- Relegated: Rangsit University
- T4 Champions League: Pathumthani University; Thonburi University
- Matches played: 156
- Goals scored: 372 (2.38 per match)
- Top goalscorer: (Egypt) Basam Radwan Mahmoud Mohamed Afify (11 goals; Grakcu Sai Mai United)
- Biggest home win: 5 goals difference Pathumthani University 6–1 Rangsit United (21 April 2019)
- Biggest away win: 4 goals difference Air Force United (B) 1–5 Grakcu Sai Mai United (12 May 2019); Air Force United (B) 0–4 Bankunmae (14 July 2019)
- Highest scoring: 7 goals Pathumthani University 6–1 Rangsit United (21 April 2019); Rangsit University 2–5 Pathumthani University (11 May 2019); Bangkok United (B) 5–2 Air Force United (B) (10 July 2019)
- Longest winning run: 8 matches SCG Muangthong United (B)
- Longest unbeaten run: 22 matches SCG Muangthong United (B)
- Longest winless run: 16 matches Air Force United (B)
- Longest losing run: 10 matches Air Force United (B)
- Highest attendance: 780; Thonburi University 2–0 Siam (25 August 2019)
- Lowest attendance: 46; Samut Prakan 1–3 Bangkok United (B) (31 July 2019)
- Total attendance: 26,530
- Average attendance: 180

The 2019 Thai League 4 Bangkok Metropolitan region is a region in the regional stage of the 2019 Thai League 4. A total of 13 teams located in Central and Bangkok Metropolitan Region of Thailand will compete in the league of the Bangkok Metropolitan region.

== Teams ==
=== Number of teams by province ===
Position	Province	Number	Teams
1	Bangkok	4	Air Force Robinson, Grakcu Sai Mai United, Police Tero (B), and Thonburi University
1	Pathum Thani	4	Air Force United (B), Bangkok United (B), Rangsit United, and Rangsit University
3	Phra Nakhon Si Ayutthaya	2	Bankunmae and Pathumthani University
3	Nonthaburi	2	SCG Muangthong United (B) and Siam
5	Samut Prakan	1	Samut Prakan

=== Stadiums and locations ===
Locations of the 2019 Thai League 4 Bangkok Metropolitan region teams
Locations of teams in Bangkok Metropolitan region

Team	Location	Stadium	Coordinates
Air Force Robinson	Bangkok (Bang Kapi)	Ramkhamhaeng University Stadium	13°45′16″N 100°37′00″E
Air Force United (B)	Pathum Thani (Lam Luk Ka)	Thupatemi Stadium	13°57′04″N 100°37′30″E
Bangkok United (B)	Pathum Thani (Khlong Luang)	Thammasat Stadium	14°04′05″N 100°35′56″E
Bankunmae	Ayutthaya (Sena)	Sena Stadium	14°19′59″N 100°24′18″E
Grakcu Sai Mai United	Bangkok (Sai Mai)	Grakcu Sai Mai Stadium	13°53′54″N 100°37′46″E
Pathumthani University	Ayutthaya (Bang Sai)	Ratchakram Stadium	14°10′09″N 100°31′45″E
Police Tero (B)	Bangkok (Lak Si)	Boonyachinda Stadium	13°52′02″N 100°34′41″E
Rangsit United	Pathum Thani (Thanyaburi)	Queen Sirikit 60th Anniversary Stadium	14°01′41″N 100°43′34″E
Rangsit University	Pathum Thani (Mueang)	Rangsit University Stadium	13°58′01″N 100°35′15″E
Samut Prakan	Samut Prakan (Bang Sao Thong)	Samut Prakan Stadium	13°34′45″N 100°47′41″E
SCG Muangthong United (B)	Nonthaburi (Pak Kret)	SCG Stadium	13°55′05″N 100°32′50″E
Siam	Pathum Thani (Thanyaburi)	Rajamangala University of Technology Thanyaburi Satadium^{16/2/2019–2/6/2019}	14°02′06″N 100°43′23″E
Siam	Nonthaburi (Bang Yai)	Nonthaburi Provincial Stadium^{6/7/2019–}	13°51′03″N 100°26′28″E
Thonburi University	Bangkok (Nong Khaem)	Thonburi University Stadium	13°43′28″N 100°20′43″E

== League table ==
=== Standings ===
Pos	Team	Pld	W	D	L	GF	GA	GD	Pts	Qualification or relegation
1	SCG Muangthong United (B)	24	16	7	1	43	15	+28	55	
2	Bangkok United (B)	24	17	3	4	44	21	+23	54	
3	Pathumthani University (Q)	24	15	7	2	49	23	+26	52	Qualification to the Champions League stage
4	Thonburi University (Q)	24	13	5	6	30	16	+14	44	Qualification to the Champions League stage
5	Police Tero (B)	24	12	6	6	26	21	+5	42	
6	Grakcu Sai Mai United	24	11	7	6	30	20	+10	40	
7	Siam	24	8	6	10	31	29	+2	30	
8	Bankunmae	24	7	6	11	25	31	−6	27	
9	Samut Prakan	24	6	6	12	22	33	−11	24	
10	Air Force Robinson	24	4	8	12	24	32	−8	20	
11	Rangsit United	24	5	4	15	19	39	−20	19	
12	Rangsit University (R)	24	4	5	15	11	33	−22	17	Relegation to the 2020 Thailand Amateur League
13	Air Force United (B)	24	2	2	20	18	59	−41	8	Suspension in 2020 season

Source: Thai League
Rules for classification: 1) Points; 2) Head-to-head points; 3) Head-to-head goal difference; 4) Head-to-head goal scored; 5) Overall goal difference; 6) Overall goal scored; 7) Fair play points; 8) Play-off without extra time).
(Q) Qualified for the phase indicated; (R) Relegated

=== Positions by round ===
Qualification to the Champions League stage
Relegation to the 2020 Thailand Amateur League

Team ╲ Round	1	2	3	4	5	6	7	8	9	10	11	12	13	14	15	16	17	18	19	20	21	22	23	24	25	26
SCG Muangthong United (B)	5	8	2*	2*	1*	1*	1*	1*	1*	2*	3	1*	2*	2*	1*	1*	1*	1*	1*	1*	1*	1*	1*	1*	1*	1*
Bangkok United (B)	7	6	4	3	3	4	3	3	2*	1*	1*	2*	1*	1*	3	2*	3	3	3	3	3	3	2*	2*	2*	2*
Pathumthani University	3	2	3	5	5	5	5	2	4	4	2	3	3	3	2	3	2	2	2	2	2	2	3	3	3	3
Thonburi University	6	3	5	7	10	8	7	8	6	7	7	7	6	6	6	6	6	6	6	5	5	6	6	5	4	4
Police Tero (B)	2*	1*	1*	1*	2*	3	2*	4	3	3	4	4	5	5	4	4	5	4	4	6	6	5	4	4	5	5
Grakcu Sai Mai United	11	9	8	6	6	6	6	5	7	6	6	5	4	4	5	5	4	5	5	4	4	4	5	6	6	6
Siam	9	7	6	8	7	7	8	7	8	8	8	8	8	8	8	8	8	8	8	8	8	7	7	7	7	7
Bankunmae	10	10	7	4	4	2	4	6	5	5	5	6	7	7	7	7	7	7	7	7	7	8	8	8	8	8
Samut Prakan	13	12	11	12	12	11	11	11	11	11	12	12	11	11	10	10	10	9	10	10	9	9	9	9	9	9
Air Force Robinson	8	13	12	10	8	9	9	9	10	9	11	10	9	10	9	9	9	10	9	9	10	10	10	10	10	10
Rangsit United	12	11	13	13	13	13	12	13	13	13	10	11	12	12	12	12	12	12	12	12	12	12	12	12	12	11
Rangsit University	4	4	9	9	9	10	10	10	12	12	9	9	10	9	11	11	11	11	11	11	11	11	11	11	11	12
Air Force United (B)	1*	5	10	11	11	12	13*	12	9	10	13*	13*	13*	13*	13*	13*	13*	13*	13*	13*	13*	13*	13*	13*	13*	13*

Source: Thai League

Notes:
* The reserve of T1 and T2 teams or also known as team (B) could not qualified and relegated, so that the teams in lower or upper positions would be qualified or relegated.

=== Results by round ===
Team ╲ Round	1	2	3	4	5	6	7	8	9	10	11	12	13	14	15	16	17	18	19	20	21	22	23	24	25	26
SCG Muangthong United (B)	W	L	W	W	W	W	W	D	D	N	D	W	D	W	W	W	W	W	W	W	W	N	D	D	W	D
Bangkok United (B)	N	W	D	W	W	L	W	W	W	W	D	L	W	W	L	W	D	L	W	W	W	W	W	W	W	N
Pathumthani University	W	D	D	D	W	D	W	W	N	W	W	L	W	D	W	W	W	W	D	W	N	W	L	D	W	W
Thonburi University	W	D	N	L	L	W	W	D	W	L	D	W	W	D	N	W	L	W	W	W	D	L	W	W	W	L
Police Tero (B)	W	W	W	W	L	L	W	D	D	W	L	D	N	W	W	L	D	D	W	L	D	W	W	W	N	L
Grakcu Sai Mai United	L	W	D	D	W	N	W	W	L	W	D	D	W	W	L	L	W	N	W	W	D	W	L	L	D	D
Siam	L	W	D	L	W	D	L	W	D	D	N	W	L	L	L	W	D	L	L	W	D	W	N	L	L	W
Bankunmae	L	D	W	W	W	W	L	N	D	W	D	L	L	D	W	L	W	D	L	N	L	L	L	L	D	L
Samut Prakan	L	L	D	L	L	W	L	L	D	L	D	N	W	L	W	D	L	W	L	L	D	W	D	N	L	W
Air Force Robinson	L	L	D	W	N	L	L	D	L	D	L	W	D	L	W	D	N	D	D	L	L	L	L	W	L	D
Rangsit United	L	L	L	L	L	W	N	L	D	L	W	L	L	L	L	L	L	D	N	L	D	L	W	D	W	W
Rangsit University	W	D	L	N	L	L	L	L	L	L	W	W	L	D	L	N	D	L	L	L	D	L	W	D	L	L
Air Force United (B)	W	N	L	L	L	L	L	L	W	L	L	L	L	N	L	L	L	L	L	L	D	L	L	L	L	D

N = No match; W = Won; D = Drawn; L = Lost

=== Results ===
For the Bangkok metropolitan region, a total 24 matches per team competing in 2 legs.

Home \ Away	AFR	AFU	BKU	BKM	GSU	PTU	PLT	RTD	RSU	SPK	SMU	SAM	TBU
Air Force Robinson	—	1–1	0–1	4–1	3–1	0–1	0–1	0–0	0–1	1–0	1–1	0–2	0–2
Air Force United (B)	3–2	—	0–2	0–4	1–5	1–3	1–2	2–3	1–0	0–1	0–1	0–2	0–3
Bangkok United (B)	2–1	5–2	—	3–2	1–0	1–1	3–1	2–0	3–1	1–0	1–2	2–0	4–2
Bankunmae	1–2	2–0	1–2	—	1–1	0–1	0–0	1–0	1–1	3–1	0–2	1–3	0–1
Grakcu Sai Mai United	0–0	3–1	1–1	4–0	—	1–2	1–3	1–0	1–0	1–0	1–1	2–1	1–1
Pathumthani University	1–1	2–1	2–1	2–0	0–0	—	3–1	6–1	4–0	3–1	3–3	2–2	1–1
Police Tero (B)	2–0	3–1	1–1	0–2	0–0	1–0	—	2–0	2–0	0–0	0–0	3–2	0–2
Rangsit United	1–0	2–0	1–2	1–2	1–2	1–3	0–1	—	1–1	2–0	0–3	1–1	1–0
Rangsit University	2–1	0–0	0–2	0–0	0–1	2–5	0–2	1–0	—	1–0	0–1	0–1	0–2
Samut Prakan	3–3	4–2	1–3	2–1	1–2	0–1	0–0	2–1	2–1	—	1–1	0–0	0–3
SCG Muangthong United (B)	3–2	1–0	1–0	1–1	1–0	4–1	1–0	4–0	2–0	1–1	—	3–0	3–0
Siam	2–2	5–1	1–0	0–1	0–1	0–2	4–0	2–2	0–0	0–1	2–1	—	1–2
Thonburi University	0–0	3–0	0–1	0–0	1–0	0–0	0–1	1–0	1–0	2–1	1–2	2–0	—

Source: Thai League
Legend: Blue = home team win; Yellow = draw; Red = away team win.
For upcoming matches, an "a" indicates there is an article about the rivalry between the two participants.

== Attendances ==
=== Overall statistical table ===
Pos	Team	Total	High	Low	Average	Change
1	Thonburi University	4,573	780	125	381	n/a
2	Rangsit University	2,750	450	80	250	−8.8%
3	Police Tero (B)	2,497	325	150	208	+22.4%
4	Grakcu Sai Mai United	2,165	320	89	197	+8.2%
5	Siam	1,890	250	140	172	−35.1%
6	Samut Prakan	2,031	300	46	169	−6.6%
7	Bangkok United (B)	1,982	381	66	165	+26.9%
8	Air Force United (B)	1,882	285	79	157	n/a
9	SCG Muangthong United (B)	1,843	259	105	154	n/a
10	Air Force Robinson	1,301	300	79	145	−13.2%
11	Pathumthani University	1,346	200	65	134	+0.8%
12	Rangsit United	1,103	300	50	100	−56.5%
13	Bankunmae	1,167	250	50	97	−23.6%
	League total	26,530	780	46	180	−4.3%

Source: Thai League

=== Attendances by home match played ===
Team \ Match played	1	2	3	4	5	6	7	8	9	10	11	12	Total
Air Force Robinson	150	100	102	Unk.2	120	200	300	79	Unk.5	150	100	Unk.8	1,301
Air Force United (B)	79	148	159	124	139	179	119	110	158	213	169	285	1,882
Bangkok United (B)	256	215	381	200	115	200	100	66	122	121	86	120	1,982
Bankunmae	50	120	70	102	70	60	100	85	90	90	250	80	1,167
Grakcu Sai Mai United	111	150	100	150	Unk.3	89	220	225	270	320	250	280	2,165
Pathumthani University	65	100	200	150	200	140	150	100	89	152	Unk.7	Unk.9	1,346
Police Tero (B)	325	165	274	212	250	250	151	150	155	200	190	175	2,497
Rangsit United	100	120	100	60	54	100	300	69	Unk.6	50	50	100	1,103
Rangsit University	400	300	260	Unk.1	235	80	100	200	450	225	200	300	2,750
Samut Prakan	220	300	218	114	200	200	130	80	116	46	250	157	2,031
SCG Muangthong United (B)	259	190	167	113	163	125	123	121	152	120	105	205	1,843
Siam	250	140	250	150	150	150	150	150	Unk.4	200	150	150	1,890
Thonburi University	125	221	180	270	320	589	450	370	325	370	573	780	4,573

Source: Thai League Note:
Unk.1 Some error of T4 official match report 6 April 2019 (Rangsit University 0–2 Police Tero (B)).
Unk.2 Some error of T4 official match report 18 May 2019 (Air Force Robinson 0–1 Rangsit University).
Unk.3 Some error of T4 official match report 1 June 2019 (Grakcu Sai Mai United 4–0 Bankunmae).
Unk.4 Some error of T4 official match report 21 July 2019 (Siam 0–2 Pathumthani University).
Unk.5 Some error of T4 official match report 31 July 2019 (Air Force Robinson 0–2 Thonburi University).
Unk.6 Some error of T4 official match report 11 August 2019 (Rangsit United 0–1 Police Tero (B)).
Unk.7 Some error of T4 official match report 21 August 2019 (Pathumthani University 3–3 SCG Muangthong United (B)).
Unk.8 Some error of T4 official match report 31 August 2019 (Air Force Robinson 1–1 Air Force United (B)).
Unk.9 Some error of T4 official match report 31 August 2019 (Pathumthani University 2–0 Bankunmae).

== Season statistics ==
=== Top scorers by team ===
Position	Teams	Name	Goals
1	Grakcu Sai Mai United	(Egypt) Basam Radwan Mahmoud Mohamed Afify	11
2	SCG Muangthong United (B)	(Thailand) Chanayut Srisawat	10
3	Pathumthani University	(United States) Diego Barrera	9
4	Bangkok United (B)	(Thailand) Veerapat Nilburapha	8
4	Siam	(Ghana) Oscar Plape	8
6	Air Force Robinson	(Thailand) Somprat Inthaphut	7
7	Thonburi University	(Thailand) Piyaphong Phrueksupee	6
8	Air Force United (B)	(Thailand) Nontapat Naksawat	5
8	Police Tero (B)	(Thailand) Nattawut Munsuwan	5
10	Samut Prakan	(Thailand) Phakpoom Malirungrueng	4
11	Bankunmae	(Thailand) Anirut Jandaeng	3
11	Bankunmae	(Thailand) Sirisuk Yenjai	3
13	Rangsit United	(Thailand) Acharob Yohannan	2
13	Rangsit United	(Thailand) Pasongsin Siripichien	2
13	Rangsit University	(Thailand) Kanthawat Petcharat	2
13	Rangsit University	(Thailand) Rattachai Homchuen	2
13	Rangsit University	(Thailand) Teerapong Malai	2

== See also ==
- 2019 Thai League 1
- 2019 Thai League 2
- 2019 Thai League 3
- 2019 Thai League 4
- 2019 Thailand Amateur League
- 2019 Thai FA Cup
- 2019 Thai League Cup
- 2019 Thailand Champions Cup
