= 2011 Regional League Division 2 Bangkok Metropolitan Region =

Regional League Bangkok Area Division
- Season: 2011
- Champions: Kasetsart University; 1st title
- Matches: 240
- Goals: 585 (2.44 per match)
- Biggest home win: Chamchuri United 5-0 Thai Airways-Look Isan (23 April 2011); Samut Prakan United 5-0 Globlex (11 June 2011); North Bangkok College 5-0 Kasem Bundit University (13 June 2011); Maptaphut Rayong 5-0 Assumption Thonburi (26 June 2011); North Bangkok College 5-0 Globlex (17 September 2011)
- Biggest away win: Thai Airways-Look Isan 0-5 Bangkok Christian College (21 May 2011); Thai Airways-Look Isan 1-6 Samut Prakan United (1 October 2011)
- Highest scoring: Thai Airways-Look Isan 1-6 Samut Prakan United (1 October 2011) (7 goals)

2011 Regional League Division 2 Bangkok Metropolitan Region is the 3rd season of the League competition since its establishment in 2009. It is in the third tier of the Thai football league system.

== Changes from last season ==
=== Team changes ===
==== Promoted clubs ====
Bangkok and Rangsit JW were promoted to the 2011 Thai Division 1 League after winning the 2009 Regional League Division 2 championship pool.

==== Relegated clubs ====
Prachinburi were relegated from the 2010 Thai Division 1 League.

==== Withdrawn clubs ====
North-Central have withdrawn from the 2011 campaign. were effectively relegated from the division due to failure to meet Regional League standards.

==== Renamed clubs ====
- Thai Summit Samut Prakan renamed Samut Prakan United.
- Nakhon Sawan Rajabhat University renamed Paknampho NSRU.
- Rose Asia United Thanyaburi renamed Thanyaburi RA United.

==== Expansion clubs ====
Globlex, Maptaphut Rayong, Assumption College Thonburi, Royal Thai Fleet and Chamchuri United joined the newly expanded league setup.

== Stadium and locations ==
Locations of the Thai Premier League 2011 teams
Football clubs in Bangkok Metropolitan Region

| Team | Location | Stadium | Capacity | Ref. |
|---|---|---|---|---|
| Assumption Thonburi-The PAC | Bang Khun Thian, Bangkok | The PAC Sport Center Stadium | 1,200 | |
| Bangkok Christian | Pathum Wan, Bangkok | Thephasadin Stadium | 6,738 | |
| Chamchuri United | Pathumwan, Bangkok | Chulalongkorn University Sports Stadium | 25,000 | |
| Globlex | Bang Kapi, Bangkok | Ramkhamhaeng University Stadium | 2,000 | |
| Kasem Bundit University | Min Buri, Bangkok | Chalerm Phrakiat 72nd Anniversary Min Buri Stadium | 8,500 | |
| Kasetsart University | Chatuchak, Bangkok | Intree Chantarasatit Stadium | 3,275 | |
| Look Isan-Thai Airways | Pathum Thani | Valaya Alongkorn Rajabhat University Stadium | ? | |
| Maptaphut Marines Rayong | Rayong | Neonphayom Stadium | ? | |
| Nonthaburi | Nonthaburi | Nonthaburi Youth Centre Stadium Nonthaburi Provincial Stadium (Wat Bot Don Prom) | 1,300 ? | |
| North Bangkok College | Pathum Thani | North Bangkok University Rangsit Campus Stadium | ? | |
| Prachinburi | Prachinburi | Koh Loi Subdistrict Administrative Organization Stadium | ? | |
| Paknampho NSRU | Nakhon Sawan | Nakhon Sawan Sports School Stadium | 2,000 | |
| Royal Thai Fleet | Sattahip, Chonburi | Sattahip Navy Stadium | 12,500 | |
| Raj-Vithi | Bang Kapi, Bangkok | Klong Chan Sports Center | ? | |
| Samut Prakan United | Samut Prakan | Samut Prakarn SAT Stadium (Keha Bang Phli) | ? | |
| Thanyaburi RA United F.C. | Pathum Thani | Chaloem Phra Kiat Stadium (Khlong 6) | ? | |

== League table ==
| Pos | Team | Pld | W | D | L | GF | GA | GD | Pts | Qualification |
|---|---|---|---|---|---|---|---|---|---|---|
| 1 | Kasetsart University (C, Q) | 30 | 18 | 10 | 2 | 55 | 29 | +26 | 64 | Champions League Round |
| 2 | North Bangkok College (Q) | 30 | 19 | 3 | 8 | 50 | 19 | +31 | 60 | Champions League Round |
| 3 | Samut Prakan United | 30 | 16 | 9 | 5 | 52 | 23 | +29 | 57 | |
| 4 | Prachinburi | 30 | 13 | 10 | 7 | 44 | 30 | +14 | 49 (Note: PCB 3–0 PNP; PNP 0-2 PCB) | |
| 5 | Paknampho NSRU | 30 | 15 | 4 | 11 | 45 | 36 | +9 | 49 | |
| 6 | Raj-Vithi | 30 | 13 | 9 | 8 | 34 | 26 | +8 | 48 | |
| 7 | Chamchuri United | 30 | 12 | 10 | 8 | 46 | 33 | +13 | 46 | |
| 8 | Nonthaburi | 30 | 12 | 9 | 9 | 33 | 31 | +2 | 45 | |
| 9 | Bangkok Christian College | 30 | 10 | 11 | 9 | 41 | 34 | +7 | 41 | |
| 10 | Globlex | 30 | 9 | 9 | 12 | 35 | 48 | −13 | 36 | |
| 11 | Maptaphut Rayong | 30 | 7 | 13 | 10 | 29 | 32 | −3 | 34 | |
| 12 | Thanyaburi RA United | 30 | 9 | 4 | 17 | 28 | 49 | −21 | 31 | |
| 13 | Assumption Thonburi-The PAC | 30 | 6 | 11 | 13 | 22 | 42 | −20 | 29 | |
| 14 | Royal Thai Fleet | 30 | 5 | 11 | 14 | 19 | 34 | −15 | 26 | |
| 15 | Kasem Bundit University | 30 | 6 | 5 | 19 | 31 | 53 | −22 | 23 | |
| 16 | Look Isan-Thai Airways | 30 | 2 | 8 | 20 | 21 | 66 | −45 | 14 | |

Rules for classification: 1) points; 2) head-to-head points; 3) head-to-head goal difference; 4) head-to-head goals scored; 5) goal difference; 6) number of goals scored.
(C) Champions; (Q) Qualified for the phase indicated

== Results ==
| Home \ Away | ACT | BCC | CHM | GLB | KBU | KST | MPT | NNB | NBC | PNP | PCB | RJV | RTF | SPU | TAL | THB |
|---|---|---|---|---|---|---|---|---|---|---|---|---|---|---|---|---|
| Assumption Thonburi-The PAC | | 0–1 | 1–0 | 1–1 | 2–0 | 1–1 | 1–1 | 1–1 | 0–1 | 1–3 | 1–5 | 0–1 | 2–1 | 2–2 | 0–1 | 0–0 |
| Bangkok Christian College | 1–1 | | 1–3 | 1–1 | 2–0 | 2–4 | 1–1 | 0–1 | 1–1 | 2–1 | 3–1 | 1–1 | 0–0 | 0–1 | 2–1 | 1–2 |
| Chamchuri United | 1–0 | 1–1 | | 2–0 | 4–2 | 1–1 | 1–1 | 1–2 | 0–1 | 2–2 | 2–0 | 0–0 | 2–0 | 2–1 | 5–0 | 2–0 |
| Globlex | 2–0 | 2–2 | 3–3 | | 1–0 | 0–1 | 2–0 | 1–1 | 0–3 | 2–1 | 1–1 | 2–2 | 3–1 | 1–2 | 1–0 | 2–0 |
| Kasem Bundit University | 1–2 | 1–0 | 2–2 | 1–2 | | 1–2 | 1–0 | 0–1 | 0–2 | 3–2 | 0–1 | 1–2 | 0–0 | 2–3 | 2–2 | 3–0 |
| Kasetsart University | 0–0 | 0–0 | 1–0 | 3–1 | 2–0 | | 1–1 | 2–0 | 2–0 | 1–0 | 2–3 | 3–3 | 1–2 | 1–1 | 2–1 | 3–1 |
| Maptaphut Rayong | 5–0 | 2–1 | 1–2 | 0–2 | 1–0 | 1–1 | | 0–0 | 0–2 | 0–1 | 1–1 | 1–1 | 0–0 | 1–1 | 1–1 | 1–0 |
| Nonthaburi | 0–1 | 1–1 | 4–0 | 0–0 | 2–1 | 3–3 | 0–1 | | 0–1 | 2–1 | 3–2 | 1–1 | 0–0 | 0–2 | 3–2 | 1–0 |
| North Bangkok College | 2–1 | 2–3 | 1–3 | 5–0 | 5–0 | 0–1 | 3–0 | 3–0 | | 0–2 | 1–1 | 1–0 | 0–0 | 2–0 | 5–1 | 1–0 |
| Paknampho NSRU | 1–2 | 2–1 | 1–1 | 2–0 | 1–1 | 1–4 | 3–2 | 2–0 | 1–0 | | 0–2 | 2–1 | 1–0 | 1–1 | 4–0 | 4–0 |
| Prachinburi | 0–0 | 2–1 | 2–0 | 3–2 | 4–0 | 1–1 | 1–1 | 0–0 | 0–2 | 3–0 | | 0–1 | 1–1 | 1–1 | 1–1 | 1–0 |
| Raj-Vithi | 3–0 | 0–3 | 2–1 | 1–0 | 2–2 | 0–1 | 1–0 | 3–1 | 1–0 | 1–0 | 2–1 | | 2–0 | 0–1 | 0–0 | 0–0 |
| Royal Thai Fleet | 0–0 | 0–1 | 2–1 | 2–2 | 1–0 | 1–2 | 0–2 | 0–1 | 0–2 | 0–1 | 1–0 | 2–1 | | 1–3 | 0–0 | 1–2 |
| Samut Prakan United | 4–0 | 1–1 | 1–1 | 5–0 | 3–0 | 0–2 | 2–0 | 2–0 | 2–0 | 2–1 | 0–1 | 1–0 | 0–0 | | 0–0 | 4–1 |
| Thai Airways-Look Isan | 1–1 | 0–5 | 0–2 | 2–1 | 0–3 | 2–4 | 2–0 | 0–2 | 0–2 | 1–2 | 1–3 | 0–2 | 1–1 | 1–6 | | 1–2 |
| Thanyaburi RA United | 2–1 | 1–2 | 0–0 | 2–0 | 2–4 | 2–3 | 2–2 | 0–3 | 0–2 | 1–2 | 1–2 | 1–0 | 3–2 | 1–0 | 2–1 | |

Legend: Blue = home team win; Yellow = draw; Red = away team win.
