= Samut Prakan United F.C. =

Thai football club

Samut Prakan United FC สมุทรปราการ ยูไนเต็ด
- Full name: Samut Prakan United Football Club สโมสรฟุตบอลสมุทรปราการยูไนเต็ด
- Nicknames: The Crab Devils (ปีศาจปู)
- Founded: 2009; 17 years ago
- Ground: Lam Fah Pha Subdistrict municipality Stadium; Samut Prakan, Thailand
- Capacity: 1,000
- Chairman: Sayan Sangwong
- Manager: Rachanon Sarasin
- League: 2018 Thailand Amateur League Bangkok Metropolitan Region
Home colours	Away colours

Samut Prakan United Football Club (Thai สโมสรฟุตบอลสมุทรปราการยูไนเต็ด) is a Thailand semi professional football club based in Samut Prakan province. They currently play in 2018 Thailand Amateur League Bangkok Metropolitan Region.

Thailand News (Sports)

Formed in 2009 as Thai Summit Samut Prakan, the club entered the Regional League Central-East Division and finished in 4th position, the season highlight's being the 5:0 home win over Prachuap Khiri Khan and 5:2 away win over Rose Asia Pathum Thani. Thai Summit also entered the 2009 Thai FA Cup overcoming Bangkok League opposition Bangkok North Central ASSN and Raj-Vithi before being beaten by TPL side Police United in the second round.

In 2010, the club moved into the Regional League Bangkok Area Division, coming up against teams they had beaten in the previous season's FA Cup matches. Hopes were raised on the back of these that they could mount a serious title challenge. This wasn't to be the case and the club came 7th out of 13 teams.

For the 2011 league campaign, the club was renamed Samut Prakan United. It was another season of hopes and the club progressed well on the field to come 3rd, just missing out on the playoffs.

In 2012, the club moved to their new stadium but the change of venue couldn't bring them success as they finished well off the promotion pace in mid-table.

== Stadium and locations ==
Coordinates	Location	Stadium	Capacity	Year
13°34′46″N 100°47′40″E	Samut Prakan	Samut Prakarn SAT Stadium (Keha Bang Phli)	?	2009–2011
13°31′25″N 100°39′10″E	Samut Prakan	Samut Prakan United Stadium	?	2012–2014
13°34′06″N 100°34′00″E	Lam Fah Pha, Samut Prakan	Lam Fah Pha Subdistrict municipality Stadium	?	2016–2017

== Season By Season record ==
Season	League									FA Cup	League Cup	Top goalscorer	
Season	Division	P	W	D	L	F	A	Pts	Pos	FA Cup	League Cup	Name	Goals
2009	Central-East	22	10	5	7	40	30	35	4th	R2			
2010	Bangkok	24	10	4	10	30	26	34	7th		QR		
2011	Bangkok	30	16	9	5	52	23	57	3rd				
2012	Bangkok	34	13	11	10	50	37	50	8th				
2013	Bangkok	26	8	8	10	23	31	32	9th				
2014	Bangkok	26	13	9	4	39	24	48	3rd				
2015	Not Enter	–	–	–	–	–	–	–	–				
2016	Bangkok-East	18	6	4	8	26	31	22	6th	Not Enter	QR1		
2017	T4 Bangkok	30	5	2	23	27	69	17	11th	Not Enter	R1	Sakchai Prom-uan	6
2018	T5 Bangkok									Not Enter	Can't Enter		

Champions	Runners-up	Promoted	Relegated
