= 2014 Regional League Division 2 Bangkok Metropolitan Region =

Regional League Bangkok Metropolitan Region
- Season: 2014
- Champions: Thai Honda
- Top goalscorer: Rodoljub Paunović (25 goals)

2014 Regional League Division 2 Bangkok Metropolitan Region is the 6th season of the League competition since its establishment in 2009. It is in the third tier of the Thai football league system.

== Changes from last season ==
=== Team changes ===
==== Promoted clubs ====
No club was promoted to the Thai Division 1 League. Last years league champions Paknampho NSRU and runners up Kasetsart University failed to qualify from the 2013 Regional League Division 2 championship pool.

==== Relocated clubs ====
J.W. Rangsit re-located to the Regional League Bangkok Area Division from the Central-East Division 2013.

Thonburi BG United re-located to the Regional League Bangkok Area Division from the Central-West Division 2013.

Nonthaburi moved into the Central-West Division 2014.

==== Relegated clubs ====
Rayong United were relegated from the 2013 Thai Division 1 League

==== Renamed clubs ====
- Assumption Thonburi renamed Assumption United.
- Bangkok Christian College renamed BCC Tero.
- RBAC-BEC Tero Sasana renamed RBAC F.C.
- J.W. Rangsit renamed Rangsit University.
- Thonburi BG United renamed Rangsit

==== Withdrawn clubs ====
Kasetsart University and Laem Chabang have withdrawn from the 2014 campaign.

== Stadium and locations ==
Locations of the 2014 Regional League Division 2 Bangkok Metropolitan Region teams
Football clubs in Bangkok Metropolitan Region

Team	Location	Stadium	Capacity	Ref.
Assumption United	Bangkok	Assumption Thonburi School Stadium (Wongprachanukul Stadium)	?	
BCC Tero	Bangkok	Thephasadin Stadium	6,378	
Chamchuri United	Bangkok	Chulalongkorn University Stadium	20,000	
Customs United	Samut Prakan	Lad Krabang 54 Stadium	2,000	
Kasem Bundit University	Bangkok	Kasem Bundit University Stadium	2,000	
North Bangkok College	Pathum Thani	North Bangkok University Rangsit Campus Stadium	1,000	
Paknampho NSRU	Nakhon Sawan	Nakhon Sawan Sport School Stadium	?	
Raj-Vithi	Nakhon Pathom	Rajamangala University of Technology Rattanakosin Salaya Campus Stadium	?	
Rangsit University	Pathum Thani	Rangsit University Stadium	2,684	
Pluak Daeng Rayong United	Rayong	Pattana Sport Club Stadium	?	
RBAC	Bangkok	RBAC University Stadium	1,000	
Rangsit	Pathum Thani	Rajamangala University of Technology Thanyaburi Satadium	?	
Samut Prakan United	Samut Prakan	Samut Prakan United Stadium	2,000	
Thai Honda	Bangkok	King Mongkut's Institute of Technology Ladkrabang Stadium	15,000	

== League table ==
Pos	Team	Pld	W	D	L	GF	GA	GD	Pts	Qualification
1	Thai Honda (C, Q)	26	21	4	1	63	16	+47	67	Champions League Round
2	BCC Tero (Q)	26	15	8	3	35	16	+19	53	Champions League Round
3	Samut Prakan United	26	13	9	4	39	24	+15	48	
4	Chamchuri United	26	14	4	8	47	34	+13	46	
5	Paknampho NSRU	26	11	10	5	43	20	+23	43	
6	Customs United	26	12	4	10	46	36	+10	40	
7	RBAC	26	11	7	8	43	34	+9	40	
8	North Bangkok College	26	11	6	9	31	22	+9	39	
9	Rangsit	26	7	9	10	27	25	+2	30	
10	Assumption United	26	7	8	11	29	36	−7	29	
11	Kasem Bundit University	26	7	6	13	24	46	−22	27	
12	Rangsit University	26	5	3	18	25	48	−23	18	
13	Pluak Daeng Rayong United	26	4	4	18	26	62	−36	16	
14	Raj-Vithi	26	1	4	21	14	74	−60	7	

Rules for classification: 1) points; 2) head-to-head points; 3) head-to-head goal difference; 4) head-to-head goals scored; 5) goal difference; 6) number of goals scored.
(C) Champions; (Q) Qualified for the phase indicated
