= VRN Muangnont F.C. =

Thai football club

VRN Muangnont วีอาร์เอ็น เมืองนนท์
- Full name: VRN Muangnont Football Club
- Nicknames: Muangnont Fighting Bulls (วัวชนเมืองนนท์)
- Founded: 2012; 14 years ago, as Kopoon Warrior; 2019; 7 years ago, as Bankunmae; 2020; 6 years ago, as STK Muangnont; 2023; 3 years ago, as VRN Muangnont Football Club
- Ground: Senabodee Stadium; Ayutthaya, Thailand
- Capacity: 1,000
- Chairman: Witoon Puteh
- Head Coach: Atiwan Tosuwanasid
- League: Thai League 3
- 2025–26: Thai League 3, 7th of 11 in the Western region
- Website: https://www.thaileague.co.th/club-info/?id=225&tn=41

VRN Muangnont Football Club (Thai: สโมสรฟุตบอล วีอาร์เอ็น เมืองนนท์), is a Thai professional football club based in Ayutthaya. The club was founded in 2012 as Kopoon Warrior. The club has token over and renamed to Bankunmae in 2019. The club is currently playing in the Thai League 3 Bangkok metropolitan region.

== History ==
In 2022, STK Muangnont competed in the Thai League 3 for the 2022–23 season. It is their 6th season in the professional league. The club started the season with a 1–2 home defeat to Prime Bangkok and they ended the season with a 0–2 away defeat to Prime Bangkok. The club has finished 11th place in the league of the Bangkok metropolitan region. In addition, in the 2022–23 Thai League Cup STK Muangnont was defeated 0–1 by Bangkok in the first qualification round, causing them to be eliminated.

== Stadium and locations ==
Coordinates	Location	Stadium	Year
14°21′00″N 100°35′50″E	Ayutthaya	Senabodee Stadium	2017
13°55′10″N 100°41′25″E	Pathum Thani	Thanarom Village Football Field	2017–2018
14°21′00″N 100°35′50″E	Ayutthaya	Senabodee Stadium	2019–

== Season by season record ==
Season	League									FA Cup	League Cup	T3 Cup	Top goalscorer	
Season	Division	P	W	D	L	F	A	Pts	Pos	FA Cup	League Cup	T3 Cup	Name	Goals
2016	DIV 3 Central	9	7	1	1	25	2	22	1st	Opted out	Ineligible			
2017	T4 Bangkok	30	11	8	11	35	41	41	6th	Opted out	QR2		(Cameroon) Ludovick Takam	7
2018	T4 Bangkok	22	5	9	8	27	28	24	7th	Opted out	QR1		(Thailand) Wittawat Wongnarat	8
2019	T4 Bangkok	24	7	6	11	25	31	27	8th	Opted out	Opted out		(Thailand) Anirut Jandaeng (Thailand) Sirisuk Yenjai	3
2020–21	T3 Bangkok	20	9	4	7	26	19	31	6th	Opted out	Opted out		(Brazil) Fabricio Peris Carneiro	6
2021–22	T3 Bangkok	26	8	9	9	29	40	33	8th	Opted out	Opted out		(Brazil) Cláudio	7
2022–23	T3 Bangkok	26	5	11	10	28	38	26	11th	Opted out	QR1		(Thailand) Kueanun Junumpai	6
2023–24	T3 Bangkok	26	4	9	13	18	35	21	10th	Opted out	Opted out	QR2	(Thailand) Pokpong Chaveesuk, (Thailand) Akkarapol Meesawat, (Thailand) Tontula Ittichotikron	3
2024–25	T3 West	22	7	9	6	30	22	30	5th	R2	QR2	LP	(Thailand) Chanayut Srisawat	7
2025–26	T3 West	20	5	8	7	24	27	23	7th	R1	QR1	LP	(Nigeria) James Oise Jesuikhode	8
2026–27	T3 West										QR1			

Champions	Runners-up	Promoted	Relegated

== Players ==
As of 1 October 2024

Note: Flags indicate national team as defined under FIFA eligibility rules; some limited exceptions apply. Players may hold more than one non-FIFA nationality.

No.	Pos.	Nation	Player
2	DF	THA	Tawat Boonsoi
4	DF	THA	Phatchanon Ditson
5	DF	THA	Nathan Rongdet
6	MF	THA	Wongsapat Silahiranrat
7	FW	THA	Piyakit Eangprayoon
10	FW	GUI	Barry Lelouma
11	MF	THA	Manop Kittiphirun
13	FW	THA	Chanayut Srisawat
14	MF	THA	Phatsaphon Choedwichit
15	DF	THA	Piyachart Palanglit
16	MF	THA	Watcharaphong Tankitcharoen
17	MF	THA	Phanuj Madbok
18	MF	THA	Poovadol Thaicharoen
19	MF	THA	Saraphob Theerakul
20	FW	THA	Mustakim Salah
21	FW	THA	Irfan Makul

No.	Pos.	Nation	Player
22	GK	THA	Chayot Junsuy
23	MF	THA	Chanayut Jejue
26	FW	THA	Thirawat Thongruang
27	GK	THA	Phiriya Siriaksornsard
28	GK	THA	Kirati Jitpakdee
29	GK	THA	Surakrai Haphonram
30	FW	GHA	Lord Arko
37	FW	THA	Adnan Yusoh
39	MF	THA	Raksaphong Ruangram
44	FW	THA	Nicky Antonius Jan de Kroon
48	DF	THA	Adinan Aenklang
60	MF	THA	Chonlachart Sujepsunthon
62	DF	THA	Jakapat Nuchkasae
77	MF	THA	Kittiton Sriboon
99	FW	THA	Sirichai Lamphuttha
