= 2017 Thai Honda Ladkrabang F.C. season =

Thai Honda Ladkrabang
2017 season
- Chairman: Monnathep Pornprapha
- Manager: Leonardo Neiva
- Stadium: 72nd Anniversary Stadium
- Thai League T1: ?
- Thai FA Cup: ?
- Thai League Cup: ?
- Top goalscorer: League: ? (?); All: ? (?)
Home colours	Away colours	Third colours

The 2017 season is Thai Honda Ladkrabang season in the Thai League T1
