= 2016 Regional League Division 2 Bangkok Metropolitan Region =

- Season: 2016
- Champions: Chamchuri United
- Relegated: Air Force Robinson
- Matches: 100
- Goals: 288 (2.88 per match)
- Top goalscorer: Opeyemi Ajayi; Bamba Messi (12 goals)
- Biggest home win: Chamchuri United 6–1 BCC (30 April 2016)
- Biggest away win: Army 0–5 Kasetsart (12 August 2016)
- Highest scoring: Chamchuri United 6–1 BCC (30 April 2016); North Bangkok 4–3 Grakcu Tabfah (14 August 2016)
- Longest unbeaten run: 12 Matches; Chamchuri United
- Longest losing run: 5 Matches; BCC
- Highest attendance: 698; Rangsit 0–2 BU Deffo (29 May 2016)
- Lowest attendance: 70; BCC 0–2 RSU (4 April 2016)

2016 Regional League Division 2 Bangkok Metropolitan Region is the 8th season of the League competition since its establishment in 2009. It is in the third tier of the Thai football league system.

== Changes from last season ==
=== Team changes ===
==== Promoted clubs ====
No club was promoted to the Thai Division 1 League. Last years league champions Customs United and runners up Chamchuri United failed to qualify from the 2015 Regional League Division 2 championsleague round.

==== Relocated club ====
- Grakcu Tabfah Pathum Thani re-located to the Regional League Bangkok Area Division from the Central-West Division 2015.
- Assumption United moved into the Western Region.
- Customs United moved into the Bangkok-East Region.
- Kasem Bundit University moved into the Bangkok-East Region.
- Rayong United moved into the Eastern Region.

==== Returning clubs ====
Central Lions is returning to the league after withdrawn from the 2013.

==== Renamed clubs ====
- Central Lions renamed Air Force Robinson.

==== Withdrawn clubs ====
RBAC have withdrawn from the 2016 campaign.

== Stadium and locations ==
Locations of the 2016 Thai Division 2 League Bangkok & field Region teams

Team	Location	Stadium	Capacity	Ref.
Air Force Robinson	Bang Sai, Ayutthaya	Ratchakram Stadium	?	
Army	Bangkok	Thai Army Sports Stadium	20,000	
BCC	Bangkok	PAT Stadium	12,308	
BU Deffo	Pathum Thani	Bangkok University Stadium	4,000	
Chamchuri United	Bangkok	Chulalongkorn University Stadium	20,000	
Dome	Pathum Thani	Thammasat Stadium	20,000	
Grakcu Tabfah Pathum Thani	Pathum Thani	Thupatemee Stadium	20,000	
Kasetsart University	Bangkok	Intree Chantarasatit Stadium	4,000	
North Bangkok University	Pathum Thani	North Bangkok University Rangsit Campus Stadium	1,000	
RSU	Pathum Thani	Rangsit University Stadium	2,684	
Rangsit	Pathum Thani	Leo Stadium	13,000	

Football clubs in Bangkok Metropolitan Region

== League table ==
Pos	Team	Pld	W	D	L	GF	GA	GD	Pts	Promotion or relegation
1	Chamchuri United (C, Q)	20	12	6	2	43	19	+24	42 (Note: CHA 2–0 KSU; KSU 1–1 CHA)	Qualification to Champions League Round and Promotion to Thai League Championship
2	Kasetsart University (Q)	20	13	3	4	43	14	+29	42	Qualification to Champions League Round and Promotion to Thai League Championship
3	BU.Deffo (P)	20	9	6	5	26	22	+4	33 (Note: BUD 3–2 ARM; ARM 1–1 BUD)	Promotion to Thai League Championship
4	Army (P)	20	9	6	5	30	28	+2	33	Promotion to Thai League Championship
5	Grakcu Tabfah Pathum Thani	20	8	7	5	24	19	+5	31	
6	Rangsit	20	8	3	9	26	21	+5	27	
7	North Bangkok University	20	5	8	7	23	23	0	23	
8	Bangkok Christian College	20	6	4	10	18	34	−16	22	
9	RSU	20	5	4	11	19	31	−12	19	
10	Dome	20	4	6	10	19	41	−22	18	
11	Air Force Robinson (R)	20	2	5	13	17	36	−19	11	Relegation to Thai Football Division 3

Source: Division 2
Rules for classification: 1) points; 2) head-to-head points; 3) head-to-head goal difference; 4) head-to-head goals scored; 5) goal difference; 6) number of goals scored.
(C) Champions; (P) Promoted; (Q) Qualified for the phase indicated; (R) Relegated

== Results ==
Home \ Away	AFR	ARM	BCC	BUD	CHA	DOM	GRA	KSU	NBK	RAN	RSU
Air Force Robinson		0–1	4–1	1–1	1–2	0–0	1–1	0–3	0–2	1–0	1–1
Army	2–1		2–1	1–1	0–0	3–3	2–1	0–5	1–0	0–0	4–1
Bangkok Christian College	3–1	0–2		1–1	0–0	2–1	2–3	1–0	0–0	1–5	3–1
BU Deffo	3–2	1–4	1–0		2–1	2–0	1–0	0–1	2–1	2–1	2–0
Chamchuri United	4–0	1–0	6–1	2–1		4–0	3–3	2–0	2–2	1–1	2–1
Dome	1–1	3–2	2–0	0–1	0–2		1–1	1–4	1–0	0–3	0–2
Grakcu Tabfah Pathum Thani	1–0	0–1	0–0	0–0	2–0	3–1		1–2	0–0	0–0	1–0
Kasetsart University	2–1	2–1	4–0	2–1	1–1	6–0	0–1		3–0	2–3	2–0
North Bangkok University	3–0	1–1	0–1	2–2	0–1	2–2	4–3	0–0		2–1	1–1
Rangsit	2–1	3–0	0–1	0–2	1–2	1–0	1–2	1–2	1–0		2–0
RSU F.C.	3–1	1–1	1–0	2–0	1–5	1–2	0–1	0–0	1–3	2–0	

Updated to match(es) played on 2 September 2016. Source: Division 2
Legend: Blue = home team win; Yellow = draw; Red = away team win.

== Season statistics ==
=== Top scorers ===
As of 2 September 2016.

Rank	Player	Club	Goals
1	(Nigeria) Opeyemi Ajayi	Rangsit	12
1	(Ivory Coast) Bamba Messi	Chamchuri United	12
3	(Thailand) Kraisorn Sriyan	Army	11
4	(Japan) Hiroyuki Sugimoto	Chamchuri United	8
4	(Brazil) Jonathan Ferreira Reis	Kasetsart University	8
4	(Vietnam) Huỳnh Kesley Alves	Kasetsart University	8
7	(Ghana) Kwabena Boateng	Grakcu Tabfah Pathum Thani	7
8	(Ghana) Robert Ghansah	North Bangkok University	6
8	(Thailand) Tanaseth Jintapaphuthanasiri	Kasetsart University	6
8	(Thailand) Eakkasit Suksawad	BU Deffo	6

== See also ==
- 2016 Thai Premier League
- 2016 Thai Division 1 League
- 2016 Regional League Division 2
- 2016 Thai FA Cup
- 2016 Thai League Cup
- 2016 Kor Royal Cup
