= Grakcu Sai Mai United F.C. =

Thai football club

Grakcu Sai Mai United เกร็กคู สายไหม ยูไนเต็ด
- Full name: Grakcu Sai Mai United Football Club สโมสรฟุตบอลเกร็กคู สายไหม ยูไนเต็ด
- Nickname(s): Dope Players (เเข้งยาโด้ป)
- Founded: 2009; 16 years ago, as Rose Asia Football Club (สโมสรฟุตบอลโรสเอเชีย)
- Ground: Grakcu United Stadium; Sai Mai, Bangkok, Thailand
- Capacity: 2,000
- Chairman: Phatcharat Rattanasutthapaboon
- Head Coach: Tewesh Kamonsin
- League: Thailand Amateur League
- 2021–22: Thai League 3, 14th of 14 in the Bangkok metropolitan region (relegated)
Home colours	Away colours

Grakcu Sai Mai United Football Club (Thai สโมสรฟุตบอลเกร็กคู สายไหม ยูไนเต็ด) is a Thailand semi professional football club based in Sai Mai, Bangkok. The club is currently playing in the Thailand Amateur League Bangkok metropolitan region.

== History ==
The club was formed in 2009 as Rose Asia Pathum Thani and entered the newly formed Regional League Central-East Division of which they came last only winning one game in their debut season, 1:0 at home to Rayong. During their debut season they also entered the 2009 Thai FA Cup and were knocked out in the qualifying round

In 2010, the club was moved by the Thai Football Association (FAT) into the Regional League Bangkok Area Division of which they again came 13th and therefore bottom once again. At the beginning of this new campaign, the club also changed their name to Rose Asia United Thanyaburi, forming closer links with the district of Thanyaburi which resides in Pathum Thani. During the 2010 campaign they also entered the 2010 Thai League Cup but lost in the qualifying round to league rivals Nakhon Sawan Rajabhat University. Rose Asia decided not to enter the 2010 Thai FA Cup.

At the beginning of the 2011 campaign, the club once again changed name to Thanyaburi United after being bought by a Korean national, dropping all ties with Rose Asia in the process.

In 2012, the club were taken over by Air Force United F.C. to be used as their feeder team. Their name was changed to Grakcu Looktabfah.

In 2018, The club changed the name to Grakcu Sai Mai United F.C. and changed the ground's name to Grakcu United stadium because it is located in Sai Mai District in Bangkok.

== Stadium and locations ==
Coordinates	Location	Stadium	Capacity	Year
14°01′41″N 100°43′33″E	Pathum Thani	Queen Sirikit 60th Anniversary Stadium	5,000	2009–2012
13°57′04″N 100°37′28″E	Pathum Thani	Thupatemee Stadium	20,000	2013–2017
13°53′54″N 100°37′46″E	Bangkok	Grakcu United Stadium	2,000	2018–present

== Seasons ==
Season	League									FA Cup	League Cup	Top goalscorer	
Season	Division	P	W	D	L	F	A	Pts	Pos	FA Cup	League Cup	Name	Goals
2009	Central-East	22	1	5	16	17	46	8	12th	QR			
2010	Bangkok	24	2	7	15	17	51	13	13th		QR		
2011	Bangkok	30	9	4	17	28	49	31	12th				
2012	Central-East	34	7	12	15	37	62	25	14th				
2013	Central-West	24	10	9	5	38	28	39	3rd		QF		
2014	Central-West	26	9	10	7	41	30	37	6th				
2015	Central-West	24	5	8	11	23	31	23	9th	Not Enter	R1		
2016	Bangkok	20	8	7	5	24	19	31	5th	Not Enter	R1	(Ghana) Kwabena Boateng	7
2017	T4 Bangkok	30	9	7	14	39	52	34	10th	R1	Not Enter	(Thailand) Krittanon Thanachotjaroenphon	7
2018	T4 Bangkok	22	10	8	4	35	27	38	3rd	Not Enter	QR1	(Thailand) Krittanon Thanachotjaroenphon	12
2019	T4 Bangkok	24	11	7	6	30	20	40	6th	Not Enter	QRP	(Egypt) Basam Radwan Mahmoud Mohamed Afify	11
2020–21	T3 Bangkok	20	6	5	9	20	26	23	9th	Not Enter	Not Enter	(Ghana) Emmanuel Kwame Akadom	8
2021–22	T3 Bangkok	26	3	6	17	27	54	15	14th	R1	QR2	(Thailand) Thanadol Jansawang (Colombia) John Steven Cabrera Ortiz	4

Champions	Runners-up	Promoted	Relegated
