= Samut Prakan F.C. =

Thai football club

Samutprakan F.C. สมุทรปราการ เอฟ.ซี.
- Full name: Samutprakan Football Club สโมสรฟุตบอลจังหวัดสมุทรปราการ
- Nickname: The Fortress
- Short name: SPFC
- Founded: 2009; 17 years ago
- Ground: Samut Prakarn SAT Stadium; Samut Prakan, Thailand
- Capacity: 5,000
- Chairman: Peerapat Thanit
- Head coach: Jirawat Lainananukul
- League: Thai League 3
- 2024–25: Thai League 3, 12th of 12 in the Eastern region (relegated)
Home colours	Away colours

Samutprakan Football Club (Thai: สโมสรฟุตบอลจังหวัดสมุทรปราการ) is a Thai professional football club based in Samut Prakan Province, Thailand. The club is currently playing in the Thai League 3 Bangkok metropolitan region.

== History ==
In 2022, Samut Prakan competed in the Thai League 3 for the 2022–23 season. It is their 16th season in the professional league. The club started the season with a 2–0 away win over Siam and they ended the season with a 2–2 home draw with Siam. The club has finished 7th place in the league of the Bangkok metropolitan region. In addition, in the 2022–23 Thai FA Cup Samut Prakan was defeated 1–2 by Sisaket United in the first round, causing them to be eliminated and in the 2022–23 Thai League Cup Samut Prakan was defeated 2–3 by Phitsanulok in the qualification play-off round, causing them to be eliminated too.

== Stadium and locations ==
Coordinates	Location	Stadium	Year
13°36′40″N 100°35′35″E	Samut Prakan	Royal Thai Naval Academy Football Field	2007
13°36′28″N 100°37′05″E	Samut Prakan	Sit Chaiyasam Football Field	2008
13°37′00″N 100°45′26″E	Bang Phli, Samut Prakan	Huachiew Chalermprakiet University Stadium	2009
13°34′46″N 100°47′41″E	Thung Khru, Bangkok	72-years Anniversary Stadium (Bang Mod)	2009
13°34′46″N 100°47′40″E	Bang Phli, Samut Prakan	Samut Prakarn SAT Stadium (Keha Bang Phli)	2010
13°42′22″N 100°47′02″E	Bang Sao Thong, Samut Prakan	Lad Krabang 54 Stadium	2010–2011
13°48′07″N 100°47′27″E	Min Buri, Bangkok	72nd Anniversary Stadium	2012
13°31′36″N 100°45′28″E	Bang Phli, Samut Prakan	Samut Prakarn Province Stadium (Bang Pla)	2012–2013
13°34′06″N 100°34′00″E	Phra Samut Chedi, Samut Prakan	Lam Fah Pha Subdistrict municipality Stadium	2013–2015
13°34′46″N 100°47′40″E	Bang Phli, Samut Prakan	Samut Prakarn SAT Stadium (Keha Bang Phli)	2016–Present

== Seasons ==
Season	League									FA Cup	League Cup	T3 Cup	Top goalscorer	
Season	Division	P	W	D	L	F	A	Pts	Pos	FA Cup	League Cup	T3 Cup	Name	Goals
2007	DIV2	22	9	7	6	38	33	34	5th	Opted out				
2008	DIV2 A	20	8	7	5	30	21	31	4th	Opted out				
2009	Central-East	22	13	7	2	41	20	46	1st	R2			(Ghana) Gyumfi Adu	18
2010	Central-East	30	15	14	1	43	16	59	2nd	Opted out	Opted out		(Ghana) Amoah Isaac	17
2011	Central-East	30	10	11	9	41	33	41	9th	Opted out	Opted out		(Guinea) Ousmane Cherif	8
2012	Central-East	34	7	12	15	29	49	33	13th	Opted out	Opted out		(Thailand) Pattanakorn Saikaeo	8
2013	Central-East	26	9	5	12	20	23	32	11th	Opted out	Opted out		(Brazil) Gilcimar Pereira Maciel	3
2014	Central-East	26	8	10	8	33	38	34	9th	Opted out	Opted out		(Nigeria) Bright Kenneth Ebuzer	10
2015	Central-East	26	15	5	6	36	22	50	3rd	R2	QR1		(Cameroon) Frank Reno	9
2016	East	22	8	5	9	28	28	29	7th	R1	QR2		(Thailand) Hamirul Che-asae	7
2017	T4 Bangkok	30	14	9	7	51	29	51	2nd	R2	QR2		(Ghana) Gabriel Mintah	14
2018	T4 Bangkok	22	7	4	11	24	38	25	6th	R1	QR1		(Ghana) Dennis Borketey	7
2019	T4 Bangkok	24	6	6	12	22	33	24	9th	R1	QR2		(Brazil) Josué Pereira da Silva Filho	7
2020–21	T3 Bangkok	20	2	6	12	15	36	12	12th	Opted out	QR2		(Guinea) Mamoudou Conde	3
2021–22	T3 Bangkok	26	1	12	13	23	38	15	13th	Opted out	QR2		(Japan) Kazuo Honma	10
2022–23	T3 Bangkok	26	8	12	6	33	27	36	7th	R1	QRP		(Thailand) Guntapon Keereeleang	8
2023–24	T3 Bangkok	26	5	5	16	20	59	20	12th	Opted out	Opted out	R2	(Brazil) Luan Borges	6
2024–25	T3 East	22	2	4	16	10	46	10	12th	Opted out	Opted out	LP	(Australia) Nicholas Boyd	3

Champions	Runners-up	Promoted	Relegated

== First team squad ==
As of 17 February 2025

Note: Flags indicate national team as defined under FIFA eligibility rules; some limited exceptions apply. Players may hold more than one non-FIFA nationality.

No.	Pos.	Nation	Player
4	DF	THA	Adam Mather
6	MF	THA	Tawatchai Wangmooklang
7	DF	AUS	Nicholas Edward Boyd
8	MF	THA	Tilawas Thanomnaew
9	FW	THA	Natthawut Srichan
10	MF	THA	Techaton Seehawong
11	MF	THA	Natthawit Kaewprom
14	MF	THA	Sirawich Punsomjai
16	MF	THA	Patsakorn Sritubtim
17	DF	THA	Thanadet Saesow
18	DF	THA	Siwa Sangsuk
19	MF	THA	Anecha Jaithon
20	MF	THA	Anothai Pongkan
21	DF	THA	Pongsakorn Innet

No.	Pos.	Nation	Player
22	FW	THA	Pattarwut Noiphontan
23	DF	THA	Chonnapat Manyuen
24	DF	THA	Pattaradet Kongpan
25	GK	THA	Nimit Ruangwong
26	FW	THA	Tepasin Mueangsuk
27	FW	THA	Marcel Sieghart
29	MF	KOR	Lee Byeong-seop
30	MF	THA	Kittitach Charoenrach
35	FW	THA	Chartchai Rungprasertphon
37	MF	THA	Nawattakorn Sriphiromvijit
47	MF	THA	Chiraphong Saengsriphuum
48	GK	THA	Natthaphong Jaiyim
55	GK	THA	Korlarp Tanthatanai
77	DF	THA	Podsathorn Somyod
97	MF	THA	Chanon Soponpongpipat
99	DF	GER	Alexander Uselmann

== Club officials ==
Position	Staff
Team Manager	(Thailand) Burathai Panlopaditsakul
Assistant Team Manager	(Thailand) Thanurak Muangraksa
Head coach	(Thailand) Jirawat Lainananukul
Assistant Head Coach	(Thailand) Chakkrit Sirivadhanasart
Goalkeeper Coach	(Thailand) Prasobchok Chokmoh
Fitness Coach	(Australia) Zachary Robert Aikens
Sport Science	(Thailand) Nopachatree Yurakitichai
Team Staff	(Thailand) Pongsiri Yakantha (Thailand) Chakrit Khamsiri (Thailand) Kiattisak Thepsuriya
Youth Team Director / Team Officer	(Thailand) Chakrit Khamsiri
Technical Director	(Thailand) Surasak Tungsurat

== Honours ==
=== Domestic leagues ===
- Regional League Division 2 Central & East
  - Winners (1) : 2009
  - Runners-up (1) : 2010
- Thai League 4 Bangkok Metropolitan Region
  - Runners-up (1) : 2017
