= AUU Inter Bangkok F.C. =

Thai football club

Inter Bangkok อินเตอร์ แบงค็อก
- Full name: AUU Inter Bangkok Football Club สโมสรฟุตบอลอินเตอร์ แบงค็อก
- Nicknames: The Bangkok Bull (กระทิงกรุงเทพ)
- Founded: 2015; 11 years ago as Bangkok University Deffo; 2018; 8 years ago as Deffo; 2019; 7 years ago as Rangsit United; 2020; 6 years ago as Inter Bangkok; 2022; 4 years ago as AUU Inter Bangkok
- Ground: Rajamangala University of Technology Thanyaburi Stadium; Pathum Thani, Thailand
- Capacity: 2,000
- Owner(s): A.U.U. Inter Sport Club Co., Ltd.
- Chairman: Tawanchay Buranon
- Head Coach: Nattawoot Ausuwantim
- League: Thai League 3
- 2024–25: Thai League 3, 8th of 11 in the Central region
Home colours	Away colours

Inter Bangkok Football Club (Thai สโมสรฟุตบอลเอยูยู อินเตอร์ แบงค็อก), is a Thai semi professional football club based in Pathum Thani. The club was founded in 2015 as Bangkok University Deffo. The club is currently playing in the Thai League 3 Bangkok metropolitan region.

== History ==
The club was established in 2015 as Bangkok University Deffo Football Club.

In 2018, the club had renamed to Deffo Football Club competed in Thai League 3.

In 2019, after relegated to Thai League 4 the club had token over and renamed to Rangsit United Football Club.

In 2020, the club was taken over and renamed to Inter Bangkok Football Club.

In 2022, AUU Inter Bangkok competed in the Thai League 3 for the 2022–23 season. It is their 8th season in the professional league. The club started the season with a 0–1 away defeat to North Bangkok University and they ended the season with a 0–0 home draw with North Bangkok University. The club has finished 10th place in the league of the Bangkok metropolitan region. In addition, in the 2022–23 Thai FA Cup AUU Inter Bangkok was defeated 0–5 by Navy in the first round, causing them to be eliminated and in the 2022–23 Thai League Cup AUU Inter Bangkok was defeated 0–1 by Siam in the first qualification round, causing them to be eliminated too.

In 2025, AUU Inter Bangkok change Football club name to 'Inter Bangkok' and don't pass club-licensing. This team relegate to Thai Semi-pro league 2026 middle region.

== Stadium and locations ==
Coordinates	Location	Stadium	Capacity	Year
14°02′19″N 100°36′08″E	Pathum Thani	Bangkok University Stadium	4,000	2015–2017
13°53′03″N 100°34′37″E	Bangkok	TOT Stadium Chaeng Watthana	5,000	2018
14°01′41″N 100°43′34″E	Pathum Thani	Queen Sirikit 60th Anniversary Stadium	5,000	2019–

== Season by season record ==
Season	League									FA Cup	League Cup	T3 Cup	Top goalscorer	
Season	Division	P	W	D	L	F	A	Pts	Pos	FA Cup	League Cup	T3 Cup	Name	Goals
2015	Div2 Bangkok	26	5	11	10	38	40	26	12th	Opted out	Opted out			
2016	Div2 Bangkok	20	9	6	5	26	22	33	3rd	Opted out	Opted out			
2017	T3 Lower	28	15	5	8	49	32	50	3rd	Opted out	Opted out		(Thailand) Anusak Laosangthai	23
2018	T3 Lower	26	4	11	11	24	36	23	14th	Opted out	Opted out		(Namibia) Tangeni Shipahu (Thailand) Wachira Phanphinit	4
2019	T4 Bangkok	24	5	4	15	19	39	19	11th	Opted out	Opted out		(Thailand) Pasongsin Siripichien (Thailand) Acharob Yohannan	2
2020–21	T3 Bangkok	20	1	5	14	12	35	8	14th	Opted out	Opted out		(Brazil) Caio Da Conceicao Silva	6
2021–22	T3 Bangkok	26	3	7	16	16	60	16	12th	Opted out	Opted out		(Thailand) Intouch Yamyindee	3
2022–23	T3 Bangkok	26	7	6	13	26	28	27	10th	R1	QR1		(Thailand) Aphiwat Charoenlai	8
2023–24	T3 Bangkok	26	4	8	14	24	49	20	11th	R2	QR1	R1	(Thailand) Chayaphon Phanwiset	7
2024–25	T3 Central	20	4	7	9	28	29	19	8th	Opted out	Opted out	LP	(Brazil) Abraão de Sousa Lima, (Nigeria) Michael Arinze Anunobi	6

Champions	Runners-up	Promoted	Relegated

- P = Played
- W = Games won
- D = Games drawn
- L = Games lost
- F = Goals for
- A = Goals against
- Pts = Points
- Pos = Final position
- QR1 = First Qualifying Round
- QR2 = Second Qualifying Round
- R1 = Round 1
- R2 = Round 2
- R3 = Round 3
- R4 = Round 4
- R5 = Round 5
- R6 = Round 6
- QF = Quarter-finals
- SF = Semi-finals
- RU = Runners-up
- W = Winners

== Players ==
=== Current squad ===
As of 1 October 2024

Note: Flags indicate national team as defined under FIFA eligibility rules; some limited exceptions apply. Players may hold more than one non-FIFA nationality.

No.	Pos.	Nation	Player
1	GK	THA	NatthapongJetsadang
2	DF	THA	Afgun Jmasala
3	DF	THA	Pitchaya Thongchinda
5	DF	THA	Kittiporn Chueachil
7	FW	AZE	Məmməd Quliyev
8	MF	THA	Prathomporn Phetcharat
10	FW	THA	Phootran Gingpan
11	FW	THA	Sataporn Laelek
12	MF	THA	Bhuvadej Loachaivaj
13	FW	THA	Saksan Ranok
14	FW	THA	Tuwanon Boonma
17	MF	THA	Sarawut Nilphan
18	DF	THA	Surawat Chaohiranphapchomphu
19	MF	THA	Thanakit Thongsri
20	MF	THA	Nopparut Kingtong
21	MF	THA	Thitiphan Aeksiri

No.	Pos.	Nation	Player
23	DF	THA	Supakrit Rodmuang
25	FW	THA	Puttipong Changwisat
26	GK	THA	Chayakorn Srithup
27	DF	THA	Taechita Charoenyos
28	DF	THA	Poranai Sirirat
29	FW	THA	Kitichai Tunnoofaeb
30	DF	GHA	Mohammed Rabiu Junior
46	DF	THA	Pipattanachai Takhot
47	DF	THA	Anucha Kaeokanha
55	DF	THA	Natthapat Purananda
56	GK	THA	Nattapon Suansan
66	DF	THA	Phonlasit Klahan
71	FW	BRA	Abraão
77	FW	THA	Prapawich Tor-on
80	DF	THA	Kittiphan Jaingam
