= Wongsapat Silahiranrat =

Thai footballer (born 1995)

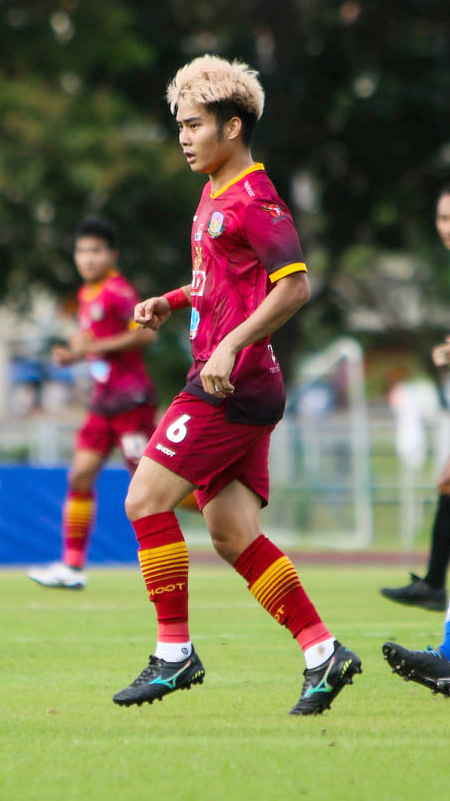
- Kasetsart FC 2021

Personal information
- Full name: Wongsapat Silahiranrat
- Date of birth: 29 June 1995 (age 31)
- Place of birth: Chanthaburi, Thailand
- Height: 1.76 m (5 ft 9 1/2 in)
- Position: Midfielder

Team information
- Current team: Lampang
- Number: 6

Senior career*
Years	Team	Apps	(Gls)
2018	Sisaket		
2019	Chiangrai United		
2019	→ Chiangmai (loan)	3	(0)
2019	→ Sisaket (loan)		
2020–2021	Chiangmai		
2021–2022	Kasetsart	25	(0)
2022–	Lampang	7	(0)
- * Club domestic league appearances and goals as of 21 December 2022

Wongsapat Silahiranrat (Thai: วงศพัทธ์ ศิลาหิรัญรัตน์, born 29 July 1995) is a Thai professional footballer who plays for Lampang.
