= The iCon RSU F.C. =

Thai football club

The iCon RSU ดิไอคอน อาร์เอสยู
- Full name: The iCon RSU Football Club สโมสรฟุตบอลดิไอคอน อาร์เอสยู
- Nicknames: The Trespassing Tiger (ไอ้เสือบุก)
- Founded: 2009; 17 years ago, as RSU Football Club; 2023; 3 years ago, as The iCon RSU Football Club
- Ground: Rangsit University Stadium; Pathum Thani, Thailand
- Capacity: 3,000
- Owner: Rangsit University
- Manager: (Thailand) Niphon Biawtungnoi
- League: Thailand Semi-pro League
- 2023–24: Thai League 3, 14th of 14 in the Bangkok Metropolitan region (relegated)
| Home colours | Away colours |

The iCon RSU Football Club (Thai สโมสรฟุตบอลดิไอคอน อาร์เอสยู) is a football club under the stewardship of Rangsit University in Pathum Thani, Thailand. They currently play in Thai League 3 Bangkok & field Region.

== Timeline ==
History of events of JW Rangsit Football Club:

| Year | Important events |
|---|---|
| 2009 | Rangsit University finish their first campaign in 8th position in the 10 team Bangkok league |
| 2010 | They finish runners up to Bangkok FC and qualify for Div 2 playoffs; Finish 4th in Group A but are surprisingly given another chance due to league expansion; Prachinburi Fc are beaten 1–0 on aggregate as JW Rangsit are promoted |
| 2011 | JW Rangsit stay up finishing 13th in Division 1; The club become homeless and groundshare with Air Force at the Thupathemi Stadium; The latter part of the season sees them move to Nakhon Nayok Military School as the Thupathemi stadium is hit by 2011 Thai Flood |
| 2012 | They continue to play in Nakhon Nayok before moving to Queen Sirikit Sport Stadium in Khlong 6, Pathumthani for Leg 2; JW are relegated back to the regional leagues after finishing in 16th position |

== Honours ==
=== Domestic leagues ===
- Regional League Bangkok Area Division
  - Runners Up (1) : 2010

== Stadium and locations ==
| Coordinates | Location | Stadium | Capacity | Year |
|---|---|---|---|---|
| 14°04′04″N 100°35′55″E | Pathum Thani | Thammasat Stadium | 25,000 | 2009 |
| 13°58′01″N 100°35′13″E | Pathum Thani | Rangsit University Stadium | ? | 2010 |
| 14°02′19″N 100°36′08″E | Pathum Thani | Bangkok University Stadium | 5,000 | 2010 |
| 13°57′04″N 100°37′28″E | Pathum Thani | Thupatemee Stadium | 20,000 | 2011 |
| 14°01′41″N 100°43′33″E | Pathum Thani | Chaloem Phra Kiat Stadium (Khlong 6) | 5,000 | 2012 |
| 13°58′01″N 100°35′13″E | Pathum Thani | Rangsit University Stadium | 3,000 | 2013–present |

== Season by season record ==
| Season | League | | | | | | | | | FA Cup | League Cup | T3 Cup | Top goalscorer | |
| Season | Division | P | W | D | L | F | A | Pts | Pos | FA Cup | League Cup | T3 Cup | Name | Goals |
|---|---|---|---|---|---|---|---|---|---|---|---|---|---|---|
| 2009 | DIV2 Bangkok | 18 | 5 | 3 | 10 | 13 | 27 | 18 | 8th | Opted out | | | | |
| 2010 | DIV2 Bangkok | 24 | 13 | 7 | 4 | 29 | 14 | 46 | 2nd | Opted out | Opted out | | | |
| 2011 | DIV 1 | 34 | 10 | 10 | 14 | 31 | 42 | 40 | 13th | Opted out | Opted out | | (Cameroon) Takem Paul Atah | 5 |
| 2012 | DIV 1 | 34 | 8 | 7 | 19 | 36 | 64 | 31 | 16th | Opted out | Opted out | | (Thailand) Tameezee Hayeeyusoh | 12 |
| 2013 | DIV2 Central-East | 26 | 9 | 5 | 12 | 39 | 38 | 32 | 10th | Opted out | Opted out | | | |
| 2014 | DIV2 Bangkok | 26 | 5 | 3 | 18 | 25 | 48 | 18 | 12th | Opted out | Opted out | | | |
| 2015 | DIV2 Bangkok | 26 | 8 | 8 | 10 | 27 | 31 | 32 | 9th | R2 | Opted out | | | |
| 2016 | DIV2 Bangkok | 20 | 5 | 4 | 11 | 19 | 31 | 19 | 9th | Opted out | Opted out | | | |
| 2017 | T4 Bangkok | 30 | 8 | 11 | 11 | 29 | 36 | 35 | 8th | Opted out | Opted out | | (Thailand) Weerayut Phuiprom | 5 |
| 2018 | T4 Bangkok | 22 | 5 | 6 | 11 | 18 | 28 | 21 | 10th | Opted out | Opted out | | | |
| 2019 | T4 Bangkok | 24 | 4 | 5 | 15 | 11 | 33 | 17 | 12th | Opted out | Opted out | | (Thailand) Kanthawat Petcharat (Thailand) Rattachai Homchuen (Thailand) Teerapong Malai | 2 |
| 2023 | TS Bangkok | 6 | 5 | 0 | 1 | 12 | 4 | 15 | 1st | Opted out | Opted out | | (Thailand) Apiwat Chuprai | 4 |
| 2023–24 | T3 Bangkok | 26 | 4 | 4 | 18 | 19 | 72 | 16 | 14th | QR | QR2 | QR2 | (Iran) Ahmadi Joupari Ali (Thailand) Apiwat Chuprai | 3 |

| Champions | Runners-up | Promoted | Relegated |
