= Chamchuri United F.C. =

Thai football club

Chamchuri United จามจุรี ยูไนเต็ด
- Full name: Chamchuri United Football Club สโมสรฟุตบอลจามจุรี ยูไนเต็ด
- Nicknames: The Sam Yan Tigers (เสือสามย่าน)
- Founded: 2011; 15 years ago
- Ground: Chulalongkorn University Stadium; Bangkok, Thailand
- Capacity: 20,000
- Owner(s): Chamchuri United Co., Ltd.
- Chairman: Dr. Vichit Kanuengsukkaseam
- Manager: Adul Luekijna
- League: Thai League 3
- 2025–26: Thai League 3, 6th of 11 in the Central region
Home colours	Away colours

Chamchuri United Football Club (Thai: สโมสรฟุตบอลจามจุรี ยูไนเต็ด) is a Thai semi-professional football club under the stewardship of Chulalongkorn University based in Bangkok. The club is founded as the football club for Chulalongkorn University in 2011 when the university's original club Chula United F.C. changed its name and relocated away from the university. The club is currently playing in the Thai League 3 Bangkok metropolitan region.

== History ==
In 2022, Chamchuri United competed in the Thai League 3 for the 2022–23 season. It is their 12th season in the professional league. The club started the season with a 1–0 away win over Kasem Bundit University and they ended the season with a 0–2 home defeat to Kasem Bundit University. The club has finished 5th place in the league of the Bangkok metropolitan region.

== Stadium and locations ==
Coordinates	Location	Stadium	Capacity	Year
13°44′15″N 100°31′31″E	Bangkok (Pathum Wan)	Chulalongkorn University Stadium	20,000	2011–2012, 2014–
14°02′19″N 100°36′08″E	Pathum Thani	Bangkok University Stadium	5,000	2013

== Season-by-season record ==
Season	League									FA Cup	League Cup	T3 Cup	Top goalscorer	
Season	Division	P	W	D	L	F	A	Pts	Pos	FA Cup	League Cup	T3 Cup	Name	Goals
2011	DIV 2 Bangkok	30	12	10	8	46	33	46	7th	Opted out	Opted out			
2012	DIV 2 Bangkok	34	14	9	11	47	46	51	7th	Opted out	Opted out			
2013	DIV 2 Bangkok	26	7	7	12	32	45	28	12th	Opted out	Opted out			
2014	DIV 2 Bangkok	26	14	4	8	47	34	46	4th	Opted out	Opted out			
2015	DIV 2 Bangkok	26	14	4	8	47	35	46	2nd	Opted out	Opted out			
2016	DIV 2 Bangkok	20	12	6	2	43	19	42	1st	Opted out	Opted out			
2017	T3 Lower	28	12	6	10	50	38	42	6th	Opted out	Opted out		(Japan) Hiroyuki Sugimoto	13
2018	T3 Lower	26	12	5	9	32	27	41	4th	Opted out	Opted out		(Thailand) Kasitinard Sriphirom	8
2019	T3 Lower	26	7	8	11	33	42	29	11th	Opted out	Opted out		(Cameroon) Isaac Mbengan	8
2020–21	T3 Bangkok	20	10	6	4	43	20	36	4th	Opted out	Opted out		(Cameroon) Isaac Mbengan	9
2021–22	T3 Bangkok	26	12	10	4	44	23	46	4th	Opted out	Opted out		(Cameroon) Isaac Mbengan	9
2022–23	T3 Bangkok	26	10	8	8	33	31	38	5th	Opted out	Opted out		(Ivory Coast) Mohamed Kouadio	9
2023–24	T3 Bangkok	26	6	8	12	28	41	26	8th	Opted out	Opted out	QR2	(Thailand) Kasitinard Sriphirom	6
2024–25	T3 Central	20	6	5	9	26	30	23	7th	Opted out	Opted out	LP	(Thailand) Watcharapong Wanthong	6
2025–26	T3 Central	20	8	4	8	33	26	28	6th	Opted out	Opted out	LP	(Thailand) Warawut Sawat	6

Champions	Runners-up	Promoted	Relegated

== Honours ==
=== Domestic leagues ===
- Regional League Bangkok Area Division
  - Winners : 2016

== Players ==
As of 1 October 2025

Note: Flags indicate national team as defined under FIFA eligibility rules; some limited exceptions apply. Players may hold more than one non-FIFA nationality.

No.	Pos.	Nation	Player
1	GK	THA	Suradit Namtontong
2	DF	THA	Kittin Dumsumran
3	DF	THA	Tananon Nuchpramoon
4	DF	THA	Thammarat Phumsathan
5	DF	THA	Phoraphat Singhapant
7	DF	THA	Watcharapong Wanthong
8	MF	THA	Kantinan Chanmunti
11	MF	THA	Warawut Sawat
12	DF	THA	Pongsakorn Sookpramool
13	MF	THA	Saranphat Chanchaemsai
16	MF	THA	Issama-ain Yaprajan
17	FW	THA	Phubadee Ornchaiphum
19	MF	THA	Prommin Pindeaw
20	MF	THA	Winyaeit Toomkumpunjaras

No.	Pos.	Nation	Player
21	MF	THA	Suphagrit Taoka
23	MF	THA	Nattawut Suksamran
24	DF	THA	Amad Heembenmad
25	DF	THA	Chujtiphon Thaensup
26	GK	THA	Napat Suemanotham
28	MF	THA	Nathaphong Thaisri
29	FW	THA	Prachpeecha Pachthong
31	DF	THA	Jaruphat Kittiwongtum
39	DF	THA	Kongpop Wannapuck
44	DF	THA	Narongkiat Somchok
45	DF	THA	Thanabodee Janrach
49	FW	THA	Pannathorn Rangchangkul
66	MF	THA	Kunakorn Suwannakuman
77	GK	THA	Ratanapong Sinyanan
99	FW	THA	Woradach Boonmakhajornkit
