= Raj-Vithi F.C. =

Thai football club

Rajvithi ราชวิถี เอฟซี
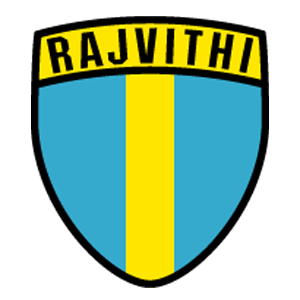
- Full name: Rajvithi Football Club สโมสรฟุตบอลราชวิถี
- Nickname(s): The Royals (ทีมชาววัง)
- Founded: 1968
- Dissolved: 2015
- Ground: Rajamangala University of Technology Rattanakosin Stadium (Salaya); Nakhon Pathom, Thailand
- Capacity: 1,500
| Home colours | Away colours |

Rajvithi Football Club (Thai: สโมสรฟุตบอลราชวิถี) was a defunct professional football club based in Bangkok, Thailand.

== History ==
Founded in 1968, they won their first title in 1969, only one year after being founded. Three more Championship titles followed, but their success was not repeated in more recent years. In 2007 they finished in 5th place, and were relegated before the end of the 2008 season to the Thailand Division 2 League.

At the beginning of the 2009 season, Bangkok Bank FC withdrew from the league before the season began. The Thai Football Association therefore decided that to fill the place, they would run a pre-season competition featuring the four relegated clubs from the Thailand Division 1 League 2008 season. Raj Vithi were one of these clubs. Raj Vithi were beaten by Thai Honda FC in the semi-final 1–0.

In 2015, Raj Vithi took a year out of the competition and did not compete in the league.

== Club Achievements ==
- Queen's Cup : Winner (1973)
- FA Cup : Winner (1974, 1975)
- Kor Royal Cup (Thai: ถ้วย ก.): Winner (1969, 1973, 1975, 1977)
- Khǒr Royal Cup (Thai: ถ้วย ข.): Winner (1995)
- Khor Royal Cup (Thai: ถ้วย ค.): Winner (1972)

== Stadium and locations ==
| Coordinates | Location | Stadium | Year |
|---|---|---|---|
| 13°52′06″N 100°50′49″E | Nong Chok, Bangkok | BEC Tero Sasana Nong Jork Stadium | 2007–2009 |
| 13°46′00″N 100°33′10″E | Din Daeng, Bangkok | Thai-Japanese Stadium | 2010 |
| 13°52′06″N 100°50′49″E | Nong Chok, Bangkok | BEC Tero Sasana Nong Chok Stadium | 2010 |
| 13°46′41″N 100°38′42″E | Bang Kapi, Bangkok | Klong Chan Sports Center | 2011–2013 |
| 13°52′02″N 100°34′39″E | Lak Si, Bangkok | Boonyachinda Stadium | 2013 |
| 13°47′48″N 100°17′53″E | Nakhon Pathom | Rajamangala University of Technology Rattanakosin Stadium (Salaya) | 2014 |

== Season By Season record ==
| Season | League | | | | | | | | | FA Cup | League Cup | Top goalscorer | |
| Season | Division | P | W | D | L | F | A | Pts | Pos | FA Cup | League Cup | Name | Goals |
|---|---|---|---|---|---|---|---|---|---|---|---|---|---|
| 2007 | DIV 1 A | 22 | 7 | 8 | 7 | 31 | 34 | 29 | 5th | | | | |
| 2008 | DIV 1 | 30 | 7 | 5 | 18 | 36 | 58 | 26 | 14th | | | Tanongsak Promdard | 18 |
| 2009 | DIV2 Bangkok | 18 | 8 | 5 | 5 | 35 | 24 | 29 | 4th | | | | |
| 2010 | DIV2 Bangkok | 24 | 15 | 1 | 8 | 41 | 33 | 46 | 4th | | | | |
| 2011 | DIV2 Bangkok | 30 | 13 | 9 | 8 | 34 | 26 | 48 | 6th | | | | |
| 2012 | Not Enter | – | – | – | – | – | – | – | – | | | | |
| 2013 | DIV2 Bangkok | 26 | 6 | 5 | 15 | 23 | 41 | 23 | 13th | | | | |
| 2014 | DIV2 Bangkok | 26 | 1 | 4 | 21 | 14 | 74 | 7 | 14th | | | | |

| Champions | Runners-up | Promoted | Relegated |

- P = Played
- W = Games won
- D = Games drawn
- L = Games lost
- F = Goals for
- A = Goals against
- Pts = Points
- Pos = Final position
- QR1 = First Qualifying Round
- QR2 = Second Qualifying Round
- R1 = Round 1
- R2 = Round 2
- R3 = Round 3
- R4 = Round 4
- R5 = Round 5
- R6 = Round 6
- QF = Quarter-finals
- SF = Semi-finals
- RU = Runners-up
- W = Winners
