= Paknampho F.C. =

- Full name: Paknampho Football Club
- Nicknames: Paknampho Gold Dragons (มังกรทองปากน้ำโพ)
- Founded: 2009; 17 years ago as Nakhon Sawan Rajabhat University Football Club
- Ground: Nakhon Sawan Sport School Stadium; Nakhon Sawan, Thailand
- Capacity: 1,000
- League: Thai League 3
Home colours	Away colours

Paknampho Football Club (Thai สโมสรฟุตบอลปากน้ำโพ) formerly Paknampho NSRU F.C. (Paknampho Nakhon Sawan Rajabhat University Football Club)is a Thailand football club based in Nakhon Sawan. The club currently plays in Thai League 3 Northern Region.

In 2014 they were suspended for a year after fans attacked a referee.

== Stadium and locations ==
Coordinates	Location	Stadium	Capacity	Year
15°44′32″N 100°07′56″E	Nakhon Sawan	Nakhon Sawan Sport School Stadium	2,000	2009–2017

== Season By Season Record ==
Season	League									FA Cup	League Cup	Top goalscorer	
Season	Division	P	W	D	L	F	A	Pts	Pos	FA Cup	League Cup	Name	Goals
2009	Bangkok	18	2	9	7	12	19	15	9th				
2010	Bangkok	24	6	6	12	33	41	24	10th				
2011	Bangkok	30	15	4	11	45	36	49	5th				
2012	North	34	21	9	4	71	30	72	3rd				
2013	Bangkok	26	17	3	6	49	26	54	1st				
2014	Bangkok	26	11	10	5	43	20	43	5th				
2015	Suspended	-	-	-	-	-	-	-	-				
2016	Central	20	8	4	8	20	17	28	5th	Not Enter	Not Enter		
2017	T4 North	24	4	8	12	31	45	20	8th	Not Enter	Not Enter	Krisada Thaphingyod	7
2018	TA North	4	1	3	0	5	4	6	13th	Not Enter	Can't Enter	Awirut Khamdee	3
2026–27	T3 North												

Champions	Runners-up	Promoted	Relegated
