= Rajamangala University of Technology Thanyaburi Stadium =

Multi-purpose stadium in Pathum Thani, Thailand

- Interactive map of Rajamangala University of Technology Thanyaburi Stadium
- Location: Thanyaburi, Pathum Thani, Thailand
- Coordinates: 14°02′06″N 100°43′21″E
- Owner: Rajamangala University of Technology
- Operator: Rajamangala University of Technology
- Capacity: 2000
- Surface: Grass

Tenant
- Rangsit F.C.

Rajamangala University of Technology Thanyaburi Stadium (Thai: สนามสมหาวิทยาลัยเทคโนโลยีราชมงคลธัญบุรี คลอง6) is a multi-purpose stadium in Pathum Thani Province, Thailand. It is currently used mostly for football matches and is the home stadium of Rangsit F.C. The stadium holds 2000 people.
