= Siam F.C. =

Thai football club

Siam F.C. สยาม เอฟ.ซี.
- Full name: Siam Football Club สโมสรฟุตบอลสยาม
- Nicknames: The Siam Spirit (สยาม สปิริต)
- Founded: 1979; 47 years ago as Bangkok Glass Sport Association; 2011; 15 years ago as Rangsit Football Club; 2013; 13 years ago, as Thonburi BG United Football Club; 2013; 13 years ago as Rangsit Football Club; 2017; 9 years ago Bangkok Glass Football Club B 2018; 8 years ago BGC Football Club; 2019; 7 years ago as Siam Football Club
- Ground: Nonthaburi Provincial Stadium; Nonthaburi, Thailand
- Capacity: 10,000
- Chairman: Tewin Narula
- Head Coach: Matias Conde Mirasso "Matu"
- League: Thailand Semi-pro League
- 2022–23: Thai League 3, 14th of 14 in the Bangkok metropolitan region (relegated)

Siam Football Club (Thai: สโมสรฟุตบอลสยาม), is a Thailand professional football club based in Nonthaburi. The club was founded in 1979 as Bangkok Glass Sport Association, and is currently playing in the Thai League 3 Bangkok metropolitan region.

== History ==
The club was established in 1979 as Bangkok Glass Sport Association and later renamed to BGC Football Club. It is a reserve team of BG Pathum United.

In 2019, the club had taken over and renamed to Siam Football Club competed in Thai League 4.

In 2022, Siam competed in the Thai League 3 for the 2022–23 season. It is their 5th season in the professional league. The club started the season with a 0–2 home defeat to Samut Prakan and they ended the season with a 2–2 away draw with Samut Prakan. The club has finished 14th place in the league of the Bangkok metropolitan region and relegated to the lower division in next season. In addition, in the 2022–23 Thai FA Cup Siam was defeated 1–4 by Chattrakan City in the first round, causing them to be eliminated and in the 2022–23 Thai League Cup Siam was defeated 1–3 by Bangkok in the second qualification round, causing them to be eliminated too.

== Stadium and locations ==
Coordinates	Location	Stadium	Year
14°00′02″N 100°40′45″E	Pathum Thani	Leo Stadium	2012
13°43′27″N 100°20′42″E	Bangkok	Thonburi University Stadium	2013
14°02′06″N 100°43′21″E	Pathum Thani	Rajamangala University of Technology Thanyaburi Satadium	2014
14°00′02″N 100°40′45″E	Pathum Thani	Leo Stadium	2015–2018
13°51′03″N 100°26′28″E	Nonthaburi	Nonthaburi Provincial Stadium	2019–present

== Season by season record ==
Season	League									FA Cup	League Cup	Top goalscorer	
Season	Division	P	W	D	L	F	A	Pts	Pos	FA Cup	League Cup	Name	Goals
2012	DIV2 Bangkok	34	11	9	14	41	43	42	11th				
2013	DIV2 Central-West	24	4	8	12	18	31	20	12th				
2014	DIV2 Bangkok	26	7	9	10	27	25	30	9th				
2015	DIV2 Bangkok	26	11	5	10	35	29	38	7th	R3	QR2		
2016	DIV2 Bangkok	20	8	3	9	26	21	27	6th	QR	QR1		
2017	Suspended												
2018	T4 ฺBangkok	22	9	10	3	33	24	37	4th	R3	QR1	(Thailand) Phattharaphon Jansuwan	9
2019	T4 Bangkok	24	8	6	10	31	29	30	7th	R1	Not Enter	(Ghana) Oscar Plape	8
2020–21	T3 Bangkok	20	2	3	15	19	41	9	13th	QR	Not enter	(Ghana) Oscar Plape	6
2021–22	T3 Bangkok	26	8	11	7	26	32	35	6th	Not enter	Not enter	(Ghana) Sarfo Otis Adjei	9
2022–23	T3 Bangkok	26	4	8	14	17	38	20	14th	R1	QR2	(Ghana) Sarfo Otis Adjei	8

Champions	Runners-up	Promoted	Relegated

- P = Played
- W = Games won
- D = Games drawn
- L = Games lost
- F = Goals for
- A = Goals against
- Pts = Points
- Pos = Final position
- QR1 = First Qualifying Round
- QR2 = Second Qualifying Round
- R1 = Round 1
- R2 = Round 2
- R3 = Round 3
- R4 = Round 4
- R5 = Round 5
- R6 = Round 6
- QF = Quarter-finals
- SF = Semi-finals
- RU = Runners-up
- W = Winners

== Players ==
=== Current squad ===
Note: Flags indicate national team as defined under FIFA eligibility rules; some limited exceptions apply. Players may hold more than one non-FIFA nationality.

No.	Pos.	Nation	Player
4	DF	THA	Piravich Aroonrat
5	DF	THA	Thanawat Khruaram
7	FW	THA	Chinnawat Chimun
9	FW	KOR	Ma Ye-sung
10	FW	THA	Jakkrawut Mekkhawan

No.	Pos.	Nation	Player
14	MF	THA	Thanapat Wongphetpoon
17	GK	THA	Phoomin Thumraksa
21	MF	THA	Thanakrit Srisathan
80	FW	GHA	Sarfo Otis Adjei

== Honours ==
- Khǒr Royal Cup
  - Winners (1): 2011 (as Bangkok Glass Sport Association)
- Khor Royal Cup
  - Runners-up (1): 2008–09 (as Bangkok Glass Sport Association)
