= Rangsit University Stadium =

Stadium in Pathum Thani Province, Thailand

- Interactive map of Rangsit University Stadium
- Location: Pathum Thani, Thailand
- Coordinates: 13°58′01″N 100°35′13″E
- Owner: Rangsit University
- Operator: Rangsit University
- Capacity: 3,000
- Surface: Grass

Tenant
- Rangsit University 2010

Rangsit University Stadium (Thai: สนามมหาวิทยาลัยรังสิต) is a multi-purpose stadium in Pathum Thani Province, Thailand. It is currently used mostly for football matches and is the home stadium of Rangsit University. The stadium holds 3,000 people.
