= 72nd Anniversary Stadium (Min Buri) =

Multi-purpose stadium in Min Buri, Bangkok, Thailand

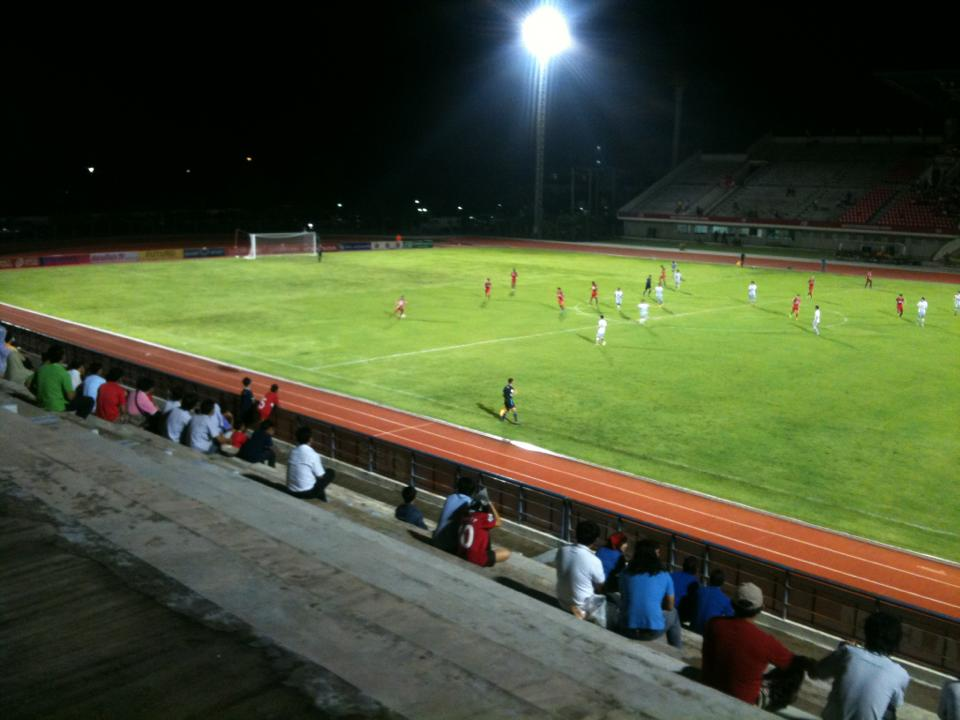
- Interactive map of 72nd Anniversary Stadium (Min Buri)
- Coordinates: 13°48′07″N 100°47′27″E
- Owner: Bangkok Metropolitan Administration
- Operator: Bangkok Metropolitan Administration
- Capacity: 10,000
- Surface: grass

Construction
- Built: 1999

72nd Anniversary Min Buri Stadium or Chalerm Phrakiat Min Buri Stadium (Thai: สนามกีฬาเฉลิมพระเกียรติ 72 พรรษา มีนบุรี) is a multi-purpose stadium in Min Buri, Bangkok, Thailand.

The stadium was built to celebrate the 72nd Birthday Anniversary of King Bhumibol Adulyadej, hence the venue's name. It is used mostly for football matches. The stadium holds 10,000 people and consists of two large single-tier stands on each side of the pitch. There is no accommodation at either end. Only one of the stands has a cover: a cantilever roof that resembles a giant spoiler from a Formula One car. This stand has red seats fitted to the area underneath the roof. The rest of the stadium is unseated.
