= Samut Prakan Stadium =

Sports venue in Thailand

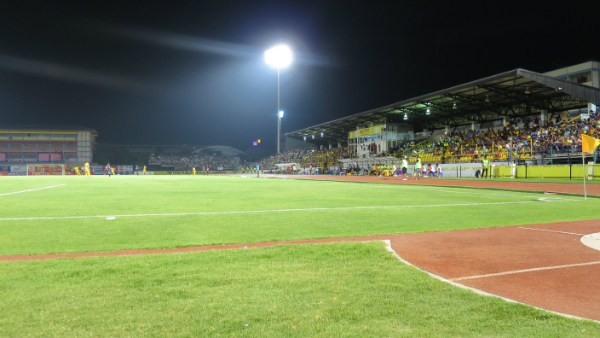
- Interactive map of Samut Prakan Stadium
- Location: Bang Sao Thong, Samut Prakan, Thailand
- Coordinates: 13°34′46″N 100°47′40″E
- Owner: Sports Authority of Thailand (SAT)
- Operator: Samut Prakan Provincial Administration Organisation
- Capacity: 5,100
- Surface: Grass

Construction
- Opened: 2015

Tenants
- Samut Prakan; Samut Prakan City

Samut Prakan Stadium (Thai: สนามกีฬาสมุทรปราการ) is a multi-purpose stadium in Bang Sao Thong, Samut Prakan, Thailand. It is mostly used for football matches and currently the home stadium of Samut Prakan, competing in the Thai League 4. The stadium holds the capacity of 5,100 spectators, recorded in 2017.

Samut Prakan City moved into the stadium for the 2019 season and made some changes to the stadium layout, building some terracing behind the goals so that fans would be closer to the pitch, and not behind the running track.
