= 2017 Thai League 3 =

- Season: 2017
- Champions: Final stage Samut Sakhon; Regional stage Khonkaen (Upper Region); Samut Sakhon (Lower Region)
- Promoted: Samut Sakhon; Khonkaen; Udon Thani
- Relegated: Singburi Bangrajun (Upper Region); Krung Thonburi (Lower Region)
- Matches: 396
- Goals: 1,071 (2.7 per match)
- Top goalscorer: (Thailand) Anusak Laosangthai (23 Goals)
- Biggest home win: 6 goals Udon Thani 6–0 Singburi Bangrajun (16 July 2017)
- Biggest away win: 5 goals Kalasin 0–5 Ayutthaya (12 March 2017); Kasem Bundit University 0–5 Bangkok University Deffo (5 April 2017); Bangkok University Deffo 0–5 Samut Sakhon (13 May 2017)
- Highest scoring: 8 goals Kasem Bundit University 4–4 Samut Sakhon (7 May 2017)
- Longest winning run: 9 matches Trang (1 match from third place play-off)
- Longest unbeaten run: 17 matches Khonkaen; Trang (1 match from third place play-off)
- Longest winless run: 21 matches Singburi Bangrajun
- Longest losing run: 8 matches Simork; Krung Thonburi
- Highest attendance: 7,760; Udon Thani 1–0 Trang (Third place play-off 8 October 2017)
- Lowest attendance: 23; Bangkok University Deffo 5–1 Banbueng (17 May 2017)
- Total attendance: 276,403
- Average attendance: 710

The 2017 Thai League 3 (known as the Euro Cake League Pro for sponsorship reasons) football season will be the first season of Thai League 3. 29 clubs will be divided into 2 groups (regions).

== Clubs ==
=== Upper Region ===
Promoted from 2016 Regional League Division 2 Northern Division

- Kamphaeng Phet
- Phrae United
- Phayao
- Lamphun Warrior

Promoted from 2016 Regional League Division 2 North-Eastern Region

- Udon Thani
- Ubon Ratchathani
- Kalasin
- Khon Kaen
- Amnat Poly United

Promoted from 2016 Regional League Division 2 Eastern Region

- Cha Choeng Sao
- Prachinburi United
- Sa Kaeo

Promoted from 2016 Regional League Division 2 Central Region

- Ayutthaya Warrior
- Ayutthaya
- Singburi Bang Rachan
- Ayutthaya United

=== Lower Region ===
Promoted from 2016 Regional League Division 2 Bangkok & field Region

- Chamchuri United
- BU.Deffo
- Royal Thai Army

Promoted from 2016 Regional League Division 2 Bangkok & Eastern Region

- Raj Pracha
- Customs United
- Banbung United
- Kasem Bundit University

Promoted from 2016 Regional League Division 2 Western Region

- Samut Sakhon
- Krung Thonburi
- Ratchaphruek University
- Simork
- BTU United

Promoted from 2016 Regional League Division 2 Southern Region

- Surat Thani
- Nara United
- Trang
- Ranong United

== Changes from last season ==
=== Changed clubs ===
- Ayutthaya Warrior was reinstated to Phichit.

=== Changed name ===
- Ratchaphruek University changed to Nakhon Si Thammarat Unity.

=== Withdrawn clubs ===
- Prachinburi United and BTU United have withdrawn from the 2017 campaign due to club licensing problems.
- Phichit

== 2017 Thai League 3 locations ==
=== Stadium and locations (Upper Region) ===
Locations of the 2017 Thai League 3 All Teams
2017 Thai League 3 Upper Region
2017 Thai League 3 Lower Region
Football clubs in Bangkok Metro

Team	Location	Stadium	Capacity
Amnat United	Amnat Charoen	Amnat Charoen Provincial Stadium	2,500
Ayutthaya	Ayutthaya	Udhomseelwitthaya School Stadium	1,800
Ayutthaya United	Ayutthaya	Senabodee Stadium (Until 11 February 2017); Ayutthaya Provincial Stadium (Since 4 March 2017)	2,500; 6,000
Chachoengsao	Chachoengsao	Chachoengsao Municipality Stadium	6,000
Kalasin	Kalasin	Kalasin Municipality Stadium	2,580
Kamphaengphet	Kamphaengphet	Cha Kung Rao Stadium	2,600
Khonkaen	Khonkaen	Khonkaen PAO. Stadium	8,000
Lamphun Warrior	Lamphun	Mae-Guang Stadium	3,000
Phayao	Phayao	Phayao Provincial Stadium	6,000
Phrae United	Phrae	Thunghong Municipality Stadium	4,500
Sakaeo	Sakaeo	Sakaeo PAO. Stadium	10,000
Singburi Bangrajun	Singburi	Singburi Provincial Stadium	4,000
Ubon Ratchathani	Ubon Ratchathani	Ubon Ratchathani University Stadium	2,000
Udon Thani	Udon Thani	Udon Thani Rajabhat University Stadium	4,500

=== Stadium and locations (Lower Region) ===
Team	Location	Stadium	Capacity
Banbueng	Chonburi	Banbueng Municipality Stadium	2,500
Bangkok University Deffo	Pathum Thani	Bangkok University Stadium, Rangsit	4,000
Chamchuri United	Bangkok	Chulalongkorn University Stadium	20,000
Kasem Bundit University	Bangkok	Kasem Bundit University Stadium, Rom Klao	2,000
Krung Thonburi	Nakhon Pathom	Mahidol University Stadium, Salaya	2,000
MOF Customs United	Samut Prakan	Customs Department Stadium, Ladkrabang 54	2,000
Nakhon Si Thammarat Unity	Nakhon Si Thammarat	Nakhon Si Thammarat PAO. Stadium	5,000
Nara United	Narathiwat	Narathiwat PAO. Stadium	5,000
Rajpracha	Bangkok	TOT Stadium, Chaeng Watthana (Until 19 February); Thonburi Stadium (Since 5 March 2017)	5,000; 5,000
Ranong United	Ranong	Ranong Provincial Stadium	7,000
Royal Thai Army	Bangkok	Thai Army Sports Stadium	20,000
Samut Sakhon	Samut Sakhon	Samut Sakhon IPE. Stadium (Until 2 April 2017); Samut Sakhon Provincial Stadium (Since 21 May)	6,300; 3,500
Simork	Angthong	Angthong Provincial Stadium	6,000
Surat Thani	Surat Thani	Surat Thani Provincial Stadium	10,000
Trang	Trang	Trang Municipality Stadium	5,000

== Results ==
=== League table (Upper Region) ===
Pos	Team	Pld	W	D	L	GF	GA	GD	Pts	Qualification or relegation
1	Khonkaen (P)	26	18	5	3	53	18	+35	59	Promotion to 2018 Thai League 2
2	Udon Thani (Q, P)	26	15	7	4	43	18	+25	52 (Note: Udon Thani ahead on head-to-head record; Udon Thani 4 pts, Ayutthaya 1 pt.)	Qualification to Promotion Play-offs
3	Ayutthaya	26	16	4	6	43	25	+18	52	
4	Ayutthaya United	26	14	5	7	40	26	+14	47	
5	Phayao	26	10	6	10	32	35	−3	36	
6	Phrae United	26	10	5	11	31	32	−1	35	
7	Chachoengsao	26	10	4	12	42	38	+4	34 (Note: Head-to-head record (Mini league): Kalasin 6 pts, Chachoengsao 6 pts and Sakaeo 6 pts were equivalent. Chachoengsao ahead on overall goals difference; Chachoengsao +4, Sakaeo -2 and Kalasin -6)	
8	Sakaeo	26	9	7	10	35	37	−2	34	
9	Kalasin	26	10	4	12	34	40	−6	34	
10	Amnat United	26	9	6	11	31	39	−8	33	
11	Kamphaengphet	26	6	9	11	21	34	−13	27 (Note: Kamphaengphet ahead on head-to-head record; Kamphaengphet 4 pts, Lamphun Warrior 1 pt.)	
12	Lamphun Warrior	26	7	6	13	22	31	−9	27	
13	Ubon Ratchathani	26	6	8	12	36	47	−11	26	
14	Singburi Bangrajun (R)	26	1	6	19	14	57	−43	9	Relegation to 2018 Thai League 4

Updated to match(es) played on 16 September 2017. Source: Thai League 3
Rules for classification: 1) Points; 2) Head-to-head points; 3) Head-to-head goals difference; 4) Head-to-head goals scored; 5) Overall goals difference; 6) Overall goals scored; 7) Fair play points; 8) Play-off without extra time;).
(P) Promoted; (Q) Qualified for the phase indicated; (R) Relegated

=== League table (Lower Region) ===
Pos	Team	Pld	W	D	L	GF	GA	GD	Pts	Qualification or relegation
1	Samut Sakhon (C, P)	28	20	5	3	54	25	+29	65	Promotion to 2018 Thai League 2
2	Trang (Q)	28	19	4	5	47	19	+28	61	Qualification to Promotion Play-offs
3	Bangkok University Deffo	28	15	5	8	49	32	+17	50	
4	Royal Thai Army	28	13	6	9	46	39	+7	45	
5	Nara United	28	11	11	6	39	28	+11	44	
6	Chamchuri United	28	12	6	10	50	38	+12	42 (Note: All head-to-head records was equivalent. Chamchuri United ahead on overall goals difference; Chamchuri United +12, Ranong United +2.)	
7	Ranong United	28	12	6	10	36	34	+2	42	
8	Nakhon Si Thammarat Unity	28	9	11	8	25	30	−5	38	
9	MOF Customs United	28	10	5	13	32	40	−8	35	
10	Surat Thani	28	7	9	12	34	40	−6	30 (Note: Head-to-head record: Surat Thani 8 pts, Kasem Bundit University 4 pts(gd 0), Banbueng 4 pts(gd -3). Kasem Bundit University and Banbueng were equivalent. Kasem Bundit University ahead on overall goals difference; Kasem Bundit University -8, Banbueng -19)	
11	Kasem Bundit University	28	8	6	14	40	48	−8	30	
12	Banbueng	28	8	6	14	29	48	−19	30	
13	Simork	28	7	6	15	31	42	−11	27	
14	Rajpracha	28	6	4	18	26	52	−26	22	
15	Krung Thonburi (R)	28	5	6	17	43	66	−23	21	Relegation to 2018 Thai League 4

Updated to match(es) played on 16 September 2017. Source: Thai League 3
Rules for classification: 1) Points; 2) Head-to-head points; 3) Head-to-head goals difference; 4) Head-to-head goals scored; 5) Overall goals difference; 6) Overall goals scored; 7) Fair play points; 8) Play-off without extra time;).
(C) Champions; (P) Promoted; (Q) Qualified for the phase indicated; (R) Relegated

=== Third place play-off ===
This round was featured by Udon Thani, the second place of 2017 Thai League 3 Upper Region and Trang, the second place of 2017 Thai League 3 Lower Region. Winners of third place play-off would promoted to 2018 Thai League 2.

==== Summary ====
Team 1	Agg.	Team 2	1st leg	2nd leg
Trang	3–3 (a)	Udon Thani	3–2	0–1

==== Matches ====
30 September 2017
18:00 UTC+7

Trang	3 – 2	Udon Thani
Adisak Khotchawat 28'; Gil Neves 70' (pen.); Nasree Dueloh 89'	Report	Sho Shimoji 59'; Valci Júnior 73'

Trang Municipality Stadium, Trang
Attendance: 1,150
Referee: Pichit Nasuwan (Thailand)
8 October 2017
18:00 UTC+7

Udon Thani	1 – 0	Trang
Valci Júnior 8'	Report

Udon Thani Rajabhat University Stadium, Udon Thani
Attendance: 7,760
Referee: Chairoek Ngamsom (Thailand)

3–3 on aggregate. Udon Thani won on away goals.

=== Final ===
This round was featured by Khonkaen, the first place of 2017 Thai League 3 Upper Region and Samut Sakhon, the first place of 2017 Thai League 3 Lower Region. Both winners and runners-up would promoted to 2018 Thai League 2 automatically.

==== Summary ====
Team 1	Agg.	Team 2	1st leg	2nd leg
Samut Sakhon	5–2	Khonkaen	3–1	2–1

==== Matches ====
1 October 2017
18:00 UTC+7

Samut Sakhon	3 – 1	Khonkaen
Welington Cruz 37'; Thales Lima 65'; Tanakon Woharnklong 90+5'	Report	Darko Tasevski 84'

Samut Sakhon Provincial Stadium, Samut Sakhon
Attendance: 1,560
Referee: Thanakorn Yuraprasit (Thailand)
7 October 2017
18:00 UTC+7

Khonkaen	1 – 2	Samut Sakhon
Darko Tasevski 68'	Report	Thales Lima 4'; Porawat Siriwattanakorn 90+5'

Khonkaen PAO. Stadium, Khonkaen
Attendance: 4,384
Referee: Thastarawut Khanthawichai (Thailand)

Samut Sakhon won 5–2 on aggregate.

== See also ==
- 2017 Thai League
- 2017 Thai League 2
- 2017 Thai League 4
- 2017 Thailand Amateur League
- 2017 Thai FA Cup
- 2017 Thai League Cup
- 2017 Thailand Champions Cup
- 2017 Thai League 3 Upper Region
- 2017 Thai League 3 Lower Region
