= 2018 Thai League 3 =

- Season: 2018
- Champions: Final stage JL Chiangmai United; Regional stage JL Chiangmai United (Upper Region); MOF Customs United (Lower Region)
- Promoted: JL Chiangmai United; MOF Customs United; Ayutthaya United
- Relegated: Kalasin (Upper Region); Deffo (Lower Region)
- Matches: 368
- Goals: 919 (2.5 per match)
- Top goalscorer: (Thailand) Chatchai Narkwijit (20 Goals)
- Biggest home win: 7 goals difference Nara United 7–0 Simork (5 August 2018)
- Biggest away win: 5 goals difference Bangkok 1–6 Chachoengsao Hi-Tek (7 July 2018)
- Highest scoring: 8 goals Simork 3–5 MOF Customs United (26 August 2018)
- Longest winning run: 6 matches JL Chiangmai United (2 matches from final)
- Longest unbeaten run: 23 matches JL Chiangmai United (2 matches from final)
- Longest winless run: 13 matches Kalasin
- Longest losing run: 5 matches BTU United; Kalasin; Kamphaengphet; Muangkan United; Royal Thai Army; Surat Thani
- Highest attendance: 3,116; Chachoengsao Hi-Tek 2–0 Muangkan United (19 August 2018)
- Lowest attendance: 30; Chiangrai City 1–1 Muangkan United (30 June 2018); Chiangrai City 0–0 Kalasin (28 July 2018)
- Total attendance: 146,747
- Average attendance: 401

The 2018 Thai League 3 (known as the Omsin League Pro for sponsorship reasons) football season will be the second season of Thai League 3. 31 clubs will be divided into 2 groups (regions).

== Changes from last season ==
=== Team changes ===
==== Promoted clubs ====
Promoted to the 2018 Thai League 2

- Samut Sakhon
- Khonkaen
- Udon Thani

Promoted from the 2017 Thai League 4

- BTU United
- JL Chiangmai United
- Chiangrai City
- Muangkan United
- Marines Eureka

==== Relegated clubs ====
Relegated to the 2018 Thai League 4 Northern Region

- Singburi Bangrajun

Relegated to the 2018 Thai League 4 Western Region

- Krung Thonburi

Relegated from the 2017 Thai League 2

- Bangkok
- Songkhla United

==== Renamed clubs ====
- Banbueng authorize from Phuket City because Banbueng is an absolute football club quota.
- Bangkok University Deffo was renamed to Deffo
- Nakhon Si Thammarat Unity was renamed to WU Nakhon Si United

==== Expansion clubs ====
- Songkhla United and Krung Thonburi Club-licensing football club didn't pass to play 2018 Thai League 3 Lower Region. This team is banned 2 years and Relegated to 2020 Thai League 4 Southern Region for Songkhla United, 2020 Thailand Amateur League Bangkok Metropolitan Region for Krung Thonburi .

==== Withdrawn clubs ====
- Amnat United and Phayao were taking a 2-years break. This team is automatically banned 2 years, don't get subsidy and relegated to 2020 Thai League 4 Northern Region for Phayao, 2020 Thai League 4 North Eastern Region for Amnat United.

== 2018 Thai League 3 locations ==
=== Stadium and locations (Upper Region) ===
Locations of the 2018 Thai League 3 All Teams
2018 Thai League 3 Upper Region
2018 Thai League 3 Lower Region
Football clubs in Bangkok Metro

Team	Location	Stadium	Capacity
Ayutthaya	Ayutthaya	Udhomseelwitthaya School Stadium	1,800
Ayutthaya United	Ayutthaya	Ayutthaya Provincial Stadium	6,000
Bangkok	Bangkok	Bang Mod Honorary Stadium	8,000
Chachoengsao	Chachoengsao	Chachoengsao Municipality Stadium	6,000
Chiangrai City	Chiang Rai	Chiangrai Province Stadium	5,000
Kalasin	Kalasin	Kalasin Municipality Stadium	2,580
Kamphaengphet	Kamphaengphet	Cha Kung Rao Stadium	2,406
JL Chiangmai United	Chiang Mai	700th Anniversary Stadium	25,000
Lamphun Warrior	Lamphun	Mae-Guang Stadium	3,000
Marines Eureka	Rayong	Klaeng Municipality Stadium	1,661
Muangkan United	Kanchanaburi	Kleebbua Stadium	5,403
Phrae United	Phrae	Thunghong Municipality Stadium	4,500
Sakaeo	Sakaeo	Sakaeo PAO. Stadium	10,000
Ubon Ratchathani	Ubon Ratchathani	Ubon Ratchathani University Stadium	2,000

=== Stadium and locations (Lower Region) ===
Team	Location	Stadium	Capacity
BTU United	Bangkok	Bangkok-Thonburi University Stadium	1,500
Chamchuri United	Bangkok	Chulalongkorn University Stadium	20,000
Deffo	Bangkok	TOT Stadium Chaeng Watthana	5,000
Kasem Bundit University	Bangkok	Kasem Bundit University Stadium, Rom Klao	2,000
MOF Customs United	Samut Prakan	Customs Department Stadium, Ladkrabang 54	2,000
Nara United	Narathiwat	Narathiwat PAO. Stadium	5,000
Phuket City	Phuket	Surakul Stadium	15,000
Rajpracha	Bangkok	Thonburi Stadium	5,000
Ranong United	Ranong	Ranong Provincial Stadium	7,000
Royal Thai Army	Bangkok	Thai Army Sports Stadium	20,000
Simork	Angthong	Angthong Provincial Stadium	6,000
Surat Thani	Surat Thani	Surat Thani Provincial Stadium	10,000
Trang	Trang	Trang Municipality Stadium	5,000
WU Nakhon Si United	Nakhon Si Thammarat	Walailak University Stadium	10,000

== Results ==
=== League table (Upper Region) ===
Pos	Team	Pld	W	D	L	GF	GA	GD	Pts	Qualification or relegation
1	JL Chiangmai United (C, Q, P)	26	17	8	1	60	31	+29	59	Promotion to 2019 Thai League 2 and Qualification to 1st Position of Play-off round
2	Ayutthaya United (Q, P)	26	16	6	4	49	23	+26	54	Qualification to 3rd Position of Play-off round
3	Lamphun Warrior	26	13	8	5	36	28	+8	47	
4	Phrae United	26	11	9	6	28	20	+8	42	
5	Bangkok	26	10	7	9	35	36	−1	37	
6	Ubon Ratchathani	26	9	5	12	29	36	−7	32	
7	Ayutthaya	26	8	7	11	26	32	−6	31	
8	Muangkan United	26	7	9	10	34	41	−7	30	
9	Chachoengsao	26	6	11	9	37	35	+2	29	
10	Sakaeo	26	6	10	10	31	34	−3	28	
11	Kamphaengphet	26	6	9	11	24	32	−8	27	
12	Chiangrai City	26	5	11	10	25	34	−9	26	
13	Marines Eureka	26	4	11	11	29	42	−13	23	
14	Kalasin (R)	26	4	9	13	20	39	−19	21	Relegation to the 2019 Thai League 4

Updated to match(es) played on 25 August 2018. Source: Thai League 3
Rules for classification: 1) Points; 2) Head-to-head; 3) Goal difference; 4) Goals scored;).
(C) Champions; (P) Promoted; (Q) Qualified for the phase indicated; (R) Relegated

=== League table (Lower Region) ===
Pos	Team	Pld	W	D	L	GF	GA	GD	Pts	Qualification or relegation
1	MOF Customs United (Q, P)	26	15	9	2	43	23	+20	54	Promotion to 2019 Thai League 2 and Qualification to 1st Position of Play-off round
2	Nara United (Q)	26	13	11	2	45	18	+27	50 (Note: Nara United ahead on head-to-head record; Nara United 4 pts, Trang 1 pt.)	Qualification to 3rd Position of Play-off round
3	Trang	26	14	8	4	34	16	+18	50	
4	Chamchuri United	26	12	5	9	32	27	+5	41	
5	Phuket City	26	11	7	8	29	23	+6	40	
6	BTU United	26	11	5	10	38	32	+6	38	
7	Royal Thai Army	26	10	5	11	30	31	−1	35	
8	WU Nakhon Si United	26	9	7	10	31	31	0	34	
9	Ranong United	26	9	4	13	30	33	−3	31	
10	Surat Thani	26	6	8	12	34	49	−15	26	
11	Kasem Bundit University	26	5	10	11	26	33	−7	25	
12	Simork	26	5	8	13	30	57	−27	23 (Note: Head-to-head record (Mini league): Simork 6 pts(gd +3), Rajpracha 6 pts(gd +1), Deffo 2 pts.)	
13	Rajpracha	26	5	8	13	25	42	−17	23	
14	Deffo (R)	26	4	11	11	24	36	−12	23	Relegation to the 2019 Thai League 4

Updated to match(es) played on 26 August 2018. Source: Thai League 3
Rules for classification: 1) Points; 2) Head-to-head; 3) Goal difference; 4) Goals scored;).
(P) Promoted; (Q) Qualified for the phase indicated; (R) Relegated

=== Third place play-off ===
This round was featured by Ayutthaya United, the second place of 2018 Thai League 3 Upper Region and Nara United, the second place of 2018 Thai League 3 Lower Region. Winners of third place play-off would promoted to 2019 Thai League 2.

==== Summary ====
Team 1	Agg.	Team 2	1st leg	2nd leg
Nara United	1–2	Ayutthaya United	1–1	0–1

==== Matches ====
8 September 2018
16:30 UTC+7

Nara United	1–1	Ayutthaya United
Ahamarasul Due-reh 90+6'	Report	Arnon Buspha 20'

Narathiwat PAO. Stadium, Narathiwat
Attendance: 2,500
Referee: Pathompong Eawjaroen (Thailand)
16 September 2018
18:30 UTC+7

Ayutthaya United	1–0	Nara United
Arnon Buspha 47'	Report

Ayutthaya Provincial Stadium, Ayutthaya
Attendance: 2,850
Referee: Ketdumrong Khemthong (Thailand)

Ayutthaya United won 2–1 on aggregate.

=== Final ===
This round was featured by JL Chiangmai United, the first place of 2018 Thai League 3 Upper Region and MOF Customs United, the first place of 2018 Thai League 3 Lower Region. Both winners and runners-up would promoted to 2019 Thai League 2 automatically.

==== Summary ====
Team 1	Agg.	Team 2	1st leg	2nd leg
MOF Customs United	0–2	JL Chiangmai United	0–1	0–1

==== Matches ====
9 September 2018
16:00 UTC+7

MOF Customs United	0–1	JL Chiangmai United
	Report	Anggello Machuca 57'

Customs Department Stadium, Lad Krabang 54, Samut Prakan
Attendance: 700
Referee: Niwat Insa-ard (Thailand)
15 September 2018
18:00 UTC+7

JL Chiangmai United	1–0	MOF Customs United
Anggello Machuca 14'	Report

700th Anniversary Stadium, Chiangmai
Attendance: 536
Referee: Patiyut Montianarts (Thailand)

JL Chiangmai United won 2–0 on aggregate.

== See also ==
- 2018 Thai League 1
- 2018 Thai League 2
- 2018 Thai League 4
- 2018 Thailand Amateur League
- 2018 Thai FA Cup
- 2018 Thai League Cup
- 2018 Thailand Champions Cup
- 2018 Thai League 3 Upper Region
- 2018 Thai League 3 Lower Region
