= 2017 Thai League 3 Lower Region =

2017 T3 Southern line
- Season: 2017
- Champions: Samut Sakhon
- Promoted: Samut Sakhon
- Relegated: Krung Thonburi
- Matches: 210
- Goals: 581 (2.77 per match)
- Top goalscorer: (Thailand) Anusak Laosangthai (23 Goals)
- Biggest home win: 5 goals Krung Thonburi 6–1 Simork (26 February 2017); Royal Thai Army 5–0 Krung Thonburi (17 May 2017); Trang 5–0 Rajpracha (16 September 2017)
- Biggest away win: 5 goals Kasem Bundit University 0–5 Bangkok University Deffo (5 April 2017); Bangkok University Deffo 0–5 Samut Sakhon (13 May 2017)
- Highest scoring: 8 goals Kasem Bundit University 4–4 Samut Sakhon (7 May 2017)
- Longest winning run: 8 matches Trang
- Longest unbeaten run: 16 matches Trang
- Longest winless run: 15 matches Krung Thonburi
- Longest losing run: 8 matches Simork; Krung Thonburi
- Highest attendance: 2,900; Chamchuri United 5–2 Royal Thai Army (16 September 2017)
- Lowest attendance: 23; Bangkok University Deffo 5–1 Banbueng (17 May 2017)
- Total attendance: 83,634
- Average attendance: 404

2017 Thai League 3 (Euro Cake League Pro) Lower Region is the 1st season of the League, its establishment in 2017. It is a part of the Thai League 3 and the feeder league for the Thai League 2. A total of 15 teams will compete in the league this season.

== Changes from Last Season ==
=== Team changes ===
==== Promoted Clubs ====
Five club was promoted from the 2016 Thai Division 2 League Western Region

- Samut Sakhon
- Krung Thonburi
- Ratchaphruek University
- Simork
- BTU United

Three club was promoted from the 2016 Thai Division 2 League Bangkok & field Region

- Chamchuri United
- Bangkok University Deffo
- Royal Thai Army

Four club was promoted from the 2016 Thai Division 2 League Bangkok & Eastern Region

- Rajpracha
- MOF Customs United
- Banbueng
- Kasem Bundit University

Four club was promoted from the 2016 Thai Division 2 League Southern Region

- Surat Thani
- Nara United
- Trang
- Ranong United

==== Renamed Clubs ====
- Nakhon Si Thammarat Unity authorize from Ratchaphruek University

==== Expansion Clubs ====
- BTU United Club-licensing football club didn't pass to play 2017 Thai League 3 Lower Region. This team is relegated to 2017 Thai League 4 Western Region again.

== Teams ==
=== Stadium and locations ===
Locations of the Thai League 3 Lower region in 2017
Football clubs in Bangkok Metropolitan Region

Team	Location	Stadium	Capacity
Banbueng	Chonburi	Banbueng Municipality Stadium	2,500
Bangkok University Deffo	Pathum Thani	Bangkok University Stadium, Rangsit	4,000
Chamchuri United	Bangkok	Chulalongkorn University Stadium	20,000
Kasem Bundit University	Bangkok	Kasem Bundit University Stadium, Rom Klao	2,000
Krung Thonburi	Nakhon Pathom	Mahidol University Stadium, Salaya	2,000
MOF Customs United	Samut Prakan	Customs Department Stadium, Ladkrabang 54	2,000
Nakhon Si Thammarat Unity	Nakhon Si Thammarat	Nakhon Si Thammarat PAO. Stadium	5,000
Nara United	Narathiwat	Narathiwat PAO. Stadium	5,000
Rajpracha	Bangkok	TOT Stadium, Chaeng Watthana (Until 19 February); Thonburi Stadium (Since 5 March 2017)	5,000; 5,000
Ranong United	Ranong	Ranong Provincial Stadium	7,000
Royal Thai Army	Bangkok	Thai Army Sports Stadium	20,000
Samut Sakhon	Samut Sakhon	Samut Sakhon IPE. Stadium (Until 2 April 2017); Samut Sakhon Provincial Stadium (Since 21 May)	6,300; 3,500
Simork	Angthong	Angthong Provincial Stadium	6,000
Surat Thani	Surat Thani	Surat Thani Provincial Stadium	10,000
Trang	Trang	Trang Municipality Stadium	5,000

=== Sponsoring ===
Team	Kit manufacturer	Shirt sponsor
Banbueng	FBT	Lucky Star
Bangkok University Deffo	Deffo	Dokbuarotoplast
Chamchuri United	FBT	Gulf
Kasem Bundit University	KELA	Asian Knowledge Institute
Krung Thonburi	Spicer	–
MOF Customs United	Mhee Cool	Thai Customs Department
Nakhon Si Thammarat Unity	KELA	–
Nara United	iAM Sport Wear	PTG Energy
Rajpracha	Deffo	–
Ranong United	Eureka	Grand Andaman Hotel
Royal Thai Army	KELA	Chang
Samut Sakhon	Pegan Sport	Thai Union
Simork	EGO Sport	M Wrap
Surat Thani	FBT	AirAsia
Trang	Made by club	AirAsia

=== Foreign players ===
Other foreign players.
AFC quota players.
ASEAN quota players.
No foreign player registered.

The number of foreign players is restricted to five per T3 team. A team can use five foreign players on the field in each game, including at least one player from the AFC member countries and one player from nine countries member of ASEAN (3+1+1).

Note :
(substituted off) : players who released during summer transfer window;
(substituted on) : players who registered during summer transfer window.

Club	Leg	Player 1	Player 2	Player 3	Player 4	Player 5
Banbueng	First				(Guinea) Ibrahima Soumah	(Chinese Taipei) Wu Chun-ching
Banbueng	Second	(Ghana) Otis Sarfo Adjei (substituted on)	(Iran) Farivar Torabi (substituted on)	(Iran) Mostafa Karimi (substituted on)	(Guinea) Ibrahima Soumah	(Chinese Taipei) Wu Chun-ching
Bangkok University Deffo	First					
Bangkok University Deffo	Second	(Brazil) Keslley Ferreira Ribeiro (substituted on)	(Laos) Khampheng Sayavutthi (substituted on)	(Laos) Mitsada Saitaifah (substituted on)		
Chamchuri United	First		(Japan) Daiki Higuchi	(Japan) Hiroyuki Sugimoto	(South Korea) Cho Hyun-woo	
Chamchuri United	Second	(Ivory Coast) Alassane Karamoko (substituted on)	(Japan) Daiki Higuchi	(Japan) Hiroyuki Sugimoto	(South Korea) Cho Hyun-woo	
Kasem Bundit University	First	(Brazil) Yuri Novaes Costa (substituted off)	(Iran) Farivar Torabi (substituted off)	(United States) Diego Barrera	(Ghana) Victor Painsil	(South Korea) Lee Dong-kyu
Kasem Bundit University	Second	(Brazil) Víctor Moraes (substituted on)	(Guinea) Barry Lélouma (substituted on)	(United States) Diego Barrera	(Ghana) Victor Painsil	(South Korea) Lee Dong-kyu
Krung Thonburi	First	(Japan) Tatsuya Fujioka	(Japan) Soma Otani	(South Korea) Lee Min-kyu	(South Korea) Song Il-eum	(Iran) Faramarz; Vahdat Derakhshan
Krung Thonburi	Second	(Japan) Tatsuya Fujioka	(Japan) Soma Otani	(South Korea) Lee Min-kyu	(South Korea) Song Il-eum	(Iran) Faramarz; Vahdat Derakhshan
MOF Customs United	First	(Nigeria) Jimmy Shola (substituted off)	(Japan) Kamiaki Kinomura (substituted off)	(Japan) Itsuki Yamada (substituted off)	(Japan) Tomohiro Onodera (substituted off)	
MOF Customs United	Second		(Argentina) Lucas Daniel Echenique (substituted on)	(Brazil) Rodrigo Silva (substituted on)	(Nigeria) Efe Obode (substituted on)	
Nakhon Si Thammarat Unity	First	(Nigeria) Anayo Cosmas (substituted off)	(Nigeria) Emmanuel Nwachi	(Ghana) Daniel Mensah	(Japan) Tetsuro Inoue	
Nakhon Si Thammarat Unity	Second	(Ghana) Samuel Abega Ampofo (substituted on)	(Nigeria) Emmanuel Nwachi	(Ghana) Daniel Mensah	(Japan) Tetsuro Inoue	
Nara United	First	(Guinea) Barry Lélouma (substituted off)	(Egypt) Mohamed Moubarak (substituted off)	(Ivory Coast) Zana Brahima	(Egypt) Ibrahim Abdelkarim	(Iraq) Malik Swadi
Nara United	Second		(Ivory Coast) Michel Ange Boka (substituted on)	(Ivory Coast) Zana Brahima	(Egypt) Ibrahim Abdelkarim	(Iraq) Malik Swadi
Rajpracha	First	(Madagascar) Carlos Zozimar (substituted off)	(Egypt) Mohamed Afify (substituted off)	(Ivory Coast) Zalla Abdoulaye	(Nigeria) Okechukwu Eric	
Rajpracha	Second			(Ivory Coast) Zalla Abdoulaye	(Nigeria) Okechukwu Eric	
Ranong United	First	(Ghana) Stephen Nii Armah (substituted off)	(Guinea) Woibada Koivogui (substituted off)	(Republic of the Congo) Burnel Okana-Stazi (substituted off)	(Ivory Coast) Sanou Oumar	
Ranong United	Second	(Cameroon) Francis Maurice (substituted on)	(Cameroon) Armand Mefire Njikam (substituted on)	(Republic of the Congo) Itubu Kevin Adeno (substituted on)	(Ivory Coast) Sanou Oumar	
Royal Thai Army	First					
Royal Thai Army	Second					
Samut Sakhon	First	(Ghana) Samuel Abega Ampofo (substituted off)	(Myanmar) Shine Thura (substituted off)	(Brazil) Thales Lima	(Brazil) Welington Cruz	(Madagascar) Guy Hubert
Samut Sakhon	Second	(Brazil) Thiago Elias (substituted on)	(South Korea) Lee Jun-ki (substituted on)	(Brazil) Thales Lima	(Brazil) Welington Cruz	(Madagascar) Guy Hubert
Simork	First	(Ivory Coast) Jean Pierre (substituted off)	(Ivory Coast) Ibrahim Amiral	(Ivory Coast) Dokure Karamoko	(Nigeria) Akinkumi Oyeyode	
Simork	Second		(Ivory Coast) Ibrahim Amiral	(Ivory Coast) Dokure Karamoko	(Nigeria) Akinkumi Oyeyode	
Surat Thani	First	(Ghana) Otis Sarfo Adjei (substituted off)	(Japan) Yuta Ogawa (substituted off)	(Ivory Coast) M'Boa Serge	(Ivory Coast) Soumahoro Mafa	(Japan) Daisuke Kobayashi
Surat Thani	Second	(Ivory Coast) Mohamed Kourouma (substituted on)	(Nigeria) Saidu Zila Sani (substituted on)	(Ivory Coast) M'Boa Serge	(Ivory Coast) Soumahoro Mafa	(Japan) Daisuke Kobayashi
Trang	First	(Brazil) Marcos Jr. (substituted off)	(Iran) Amir Seyed Bagher (substituted off)	(Brazil) Gil Neves	(Brazil) Douglas Lopes	(Togo) Abdou Yacoubou
Trang	Second	(Brazil) Weslei Batista Ferreira (substituted on)	(Nigeria) Anayo Cosmas (substituted on)	(Brazil) Gil Neves	(Brazil) Douglas Lopes	(Togo) Abdou Yacoubou

== League table ==
=== Standings ===
Pos	Team	Pld	W	D	L	GF	GA	GD	Pts	Qualification or relegation
1	Samut Sakhon (C, P)	28	20	5	3	54	25	+29	65	Promotion to 2018 Thai League 2
2	Trang (Q)	28	19	4	5	47	19	+28	61	Qualification to Promotion Play-offs
3	Bangkok University Deffo	28	15	5	8	49	32	+17	50	
4	Royal Thai Army	28	13	6	9	46	39	+7	45	
5	Nara United	28	11	11	6	39	28	+11	44	
6	Chamchuri United	28	12	6	10	50	38	+12	42 (Note: All head-to-head records was equivalent. Chamchuri United ahead on overall goals difference; Chamchuri United +12, Ranong United +2.)	
7	Ranong United	28	12	6	10	36	34	+2	42	
8	Nakhon Si Thammarat Unity	28	9	11	8	25	30	−5	38	
9	MOF Customs United	28	10	5	13	32	40	−8	35	
10	Surat Thani	28	7	9	12	34	40	−6	30 (Note: Head-to-head record: Surat Thani 8 pts, Kasem Bundit University 4 pts(gd 0), Banbueng 4 pts(gd -3). Kasem Bundit University and Banbueng were equivalent. Kasem Bundit University ahead on overall goals difference; Kasem Bundit University -8, Banbueng -19)	
11	Kasem Bundit University	28	8	6	14	40	48	−8	30	
12	Banbueng	28	8	6	14	29	48	−19	30	
13	Simork	28	7	6	15	31	42	−11	27	
14	Rajpracha	28	6	4	18	26	52	−26	22	
15	Krung Thonburi (R)	28	5	6	17	43	66	−23	21	Relegation to 2018 Thai League 4

Updated to match(es) played on 16 September 2017. Source: Thai League 3
Rules for classification: 1) Points; 2) Head-to-head points; 3) Head-to-head goals difference; 4) Head-to-head goals scored; 5) Overall goals difference; 6) Overall goals scored; 7) Fair play points; 8) Play-off without extra time;).
(C) Champions; (P) Promoted; (Q) Qualified for the phase indicated; (R) Relegated

=== Positions by round ===
Leader and promotion to the 2018 Thai League 2
Qualification for Thai League 3 Play-offs
Relegation to the 2018 Thai League 4

The table lists the positions of teams after each week of matches. In order to preserve chronological evolvements, any postponed matches are not included in the round at which they were originally scheduled, but added to the full round they were played immediately afterwards. For example, if a match is scheduled for matchday 13, but then postponed and played between days 16 and 17, it will be added to the standings for day 16.

Team ╲ Round	1	2	3	4	5	6	7	8	9	10	11	12	13	14	15	16	17	18	19	20	21	22	23	24	25	26	27	28	29	30
Samut Sakhon	1	6	2	1	1	1	1	1	1	1	1	1	1	1	1	1	1	1	1	1	1	1	1	1	1	1	1	1	1	1
Trang	9	12	7	4	6	7	8	11	13	10	8	7	8	6	6	6	5	4	4	3	4	4	4	3	3	3	2	2	2	2
Bangkok University Deffo	6	13	13	10	13	11	11	4	3	3	2	2	3	3	3	3	3	3	3	4	3	3	2	2	2	2	3	3	3	3
Royal Thai Army	3	1	3	5	7	9	10	8	6	5	5	5	5	5	4	4	4	5	5	5	5	5	5	5	5	6	6	5	4	4
Nara United	7	3	6	8	3	5	4	3	2	2	4	4	4	4	5	5	6	6	7	7	7	7	7	7	7	5	5	4	5	5
Chamchuri United	11	10	10	7	4	6	7	10	12	8	9	9	7	8	8	8	8	8	9	8	10	10	11	8	8	8	8	7	7	6
Ranong United	5	4	4	2	2	2	2	2	4	4	3	3	2	2	2	2	2	2	2	2	2	2	3	4	4	4	4	6	6	7
Nakhon Si Thammarat Unity	4	5	5	6	8	4	3	5	5	6	6	6	6	7	7	7	7	7	6	6	6	6	6	6	6	7	7	8	8	8
MOF Customs United	2	2	8	9	10	10	6	6	7	7	10	11	14	13	13	10	11	9	8	9	8	9	9	10	10	9	9	9	9	9
Surat Thani	15	14	11	12	12	13	12	9	10	13	13	14	10	10	10	11	10	13	11	12	11	11	12	12	12	11	11	13	10	10
Kasem Bundit University	12	11	12	14	14	14	13	14	14	11	12	12	11	9	9	9	9	10	12	10	9	8	8	9	9	10	10	11	12	11
Banbueng	13	15	15	15	11	12	14	13	11	14	14	13	12	12	12	13	13	12	10	11	12	12	10	11	11	12	12	10	11	12
Simork	10	9	14	13	15	15	15	15	15	15	15	15	15	15	15	15	15	15	15	14	14	15	15	15	14	13	13	12	13	13
Rajpracha	8	8	9	11	9	8	9	12	8	9	7	8	9	11	11	12	12	11	13	13	13	13	13	13	13	14	14	14	14	14
Krung Thonburi	14	7	1	3	5	3	5	7	9	12	11	10	13	14	14	14	14	14	14	15	15	14	14	14	15	15	15	15	15	15

Source: Thai League 3

=== Results by match played ===
Team ╲ Round	1	2	3	4	5	6	7	8	9	10	11	12	13	14	15	16	17	18	19	20	21	22	23	24	25	26	27	28
Samut Sakhon	W	L	W	W	W	W	W	W	W	L	D	D	W	W	W	W	L	W	D	W	W	D	W	W	W	W	W	D
Trang	D	L	W	W	L	D	L	L	W	W	D	L	W	W	W	W	W	W	W	W	D	W	W	W	W	W	W	W
Bangkok University Deffo	D	L	D	D	W	W	W	W	W	W	W	L	W	L	W	D	W	L	W	W	W	L	W	W	L	L	L	D
Royal Thai Army	W	W	L	D	L	W	L	W	W	D	W	D	W	D	L	W	L	W	D	L	W	D	L	L	W	W	W	L
Nara United	D	W	D	W	L	W	D	W	W	D	D	D	W	L	L	D	L	D	D	L	W	D	W	W	W	W	L	D
Chamchuri United	L	D	D	W	W	L	L	L	W	D	D	W	L	W	L	D	L	L	W	L	D	W	W	L	W	W	W	W
Ranong United	W	D	D	W	W	W	L	D	W	W	D	W	W	D	W	L	W	W	L	L	W	L	D	L	L	L	L	L
Nakhon Si Thammarat Unity	W	D	D	D	L	W	W	L	W	L	D	D	L	W	D	W	L	W	D	D	W	D	W	L	L	L	D	D
MOF Customs United	W	D	L	D	L	D	W	W	L	L	L	L	L	D	W	L	W	W	L	W	D	L	L	W	L	W	W	L
Surat Thani	L	D	D	L	D	W	W	L	L	L	D	W	D	D	L	D	L	W	W	L	L	D	L	W	L	L	W	D
Kasem Bundit University	L	D	L	D	L	W	L	L	W	W	L	D	D	W	D	D	L	L	W	W	W	L	L	L	L	L	L	W
Banbueng	L	L	L	W	L	L	W	W	L	L	W	D	L	D	L	W	W	D	D	L	W	L	D	L	L	W	L	D
Simork	D	L	D	L	L	L	L	L	L	L	L	D	D	L	W	W	D	L	D	L	L	L	W	W	W	W	W	L
Rajpracha	D	D	L	W	W	L	L	W	L	W	L	L	L	D	L	L	W	L	D	L	L	L	L	L	W	L	L	L
Krung Thonburi	L	W	W	D	L	W	L	L	L	L	D	D	L	L	L	L	L	L	L	L	D	W	D	L	L	L	D	W

Source: Thai League 3
W = Win; D = Draw; L = Loss

=== Results ===
Home \ Away	BAN	BUD	CCU	KBU	KTB	CTU	NTU	NRU	RAJ	RNU	ARM	SSK	SMK	SRT	TRG
Banbueng		4–0	0–4	1–0	2–1	1–0	2–2	2–2	1–1	0–0	1–1	1–0	1–0	0–0	1–2
Bangkok University Deffo	5–1		1–2	1–1	2–2	1–0	0–1	0–0	5–1	1–0	0–1	0–5	2–1	2–0	0–1
Chamchuri United	4–0	2–0		3–2	4–3	2–1	1–2	1–1	1–2	3–2	5–2	2–3	1–1	1–1	2–0
Kasem Bundit University	2–0	0–5	1–0		3–2	4–2	0–0	0–1	4–2	0–1	3–2	4–4	2–1	1–2	2–4
Krung Thonburi	1–2	1–4	1–1	2–1		1–1	1–2	1–1	4–2	3–2	1–2	1–0	6–1	2–4	3–3
MOF Customs United	2–1	1–2	1–3	2–1	2–1		2–1	2–0	0–0	0–1	2–2	1–3	3–2	2–0	0–2
Nakhon Si Thammarat Unity	1–0	1–2	0–0	1–1	2–2	0–0		1–1	0–1	2–0	1–0	0–0	0–0	1–0	0–2
Nara United	4–1	0–0	2–0	2–2	4–0	3–0	1–2		1–0	2–2	3–2	1–3	0–0	2–0	2–1
Rajpracha	1–0	1–4	1–3	0–2	4–1	0–2	0–2	0–1		1–1	0–1	2–3	0–1	1–0	0–0
Ranong United	4–2	1–2	1–0	1–0	1–0	1–2	0–0	1–0	2–1		1–1	3–1	2–0	1–1	1–2
Royal Thai Army	2–1	0–4	2–1	3–2	5–0	3–0	1–1	1–1	1–0	5–2		0–2	1–0	1–1	2–0
Samut Sakhon	2–1	2–1	3–2	2–0	4–2	1–0	3–1	3–1	2–1	1–0	1–0		2–0	2–0	0–0
Simork	1–2	2–3	2–0	1–0	3–0	2–4	4–0	0–0	0–2	2–3	3–2	0–0		2–1	0–1
Surat Thani	3–1	0–1	1–1	2–2	1–0	0–0	3–1	1–3	5–2	2–1	2–3	1–1	2–2		1–2
Trang	3–0	1–1	2–1	1–0	3–1	2–0	3–0	2–0	5–0	0–1	1–0	0–1	2–0	2–0	

Updated to match(es) played on 16 September 2017. Source: Thai League 3
Legend: Blue = home team win; Yellow = draw; Red = away team win.

== Season statistics ==
=== Top scorers ===
As of 16 September 2017.

Rank	Player	Club	Goals
1	(Thailand) Anusak Laosangthai	Bangkok University Deffo	23
2	(Ivory Coast) Sanou Oumar	Ranong United	16
3	(Thailand) Kraisorn Sriyan	Royal Thai Army	14
4	(Brazil) Douglas Lopes Carneiro	Trang	13
4	(Japan) Hiroyuki Sugimoto	Chamchuri United	13
6	(Brazil) Welington Adao Gomes	Samut Sakhon	12
6	(Ivory Coast) Doukouré Karamoko	Simork	12
8	(Brazil) Thales Lima	Samut Sakhon	11
9	(Ivory Coast) Ouattara Zana Brahima	Nara United	10
10	(Guinea) Alpha Oumar Lelouma Barry	Nara United (8), Kasem Bundit University (1)	9
10	(Thailand) Nasree Due-loh	Trang	9
10	(Ivory Coast) Soumahoro Mafa	Surat Thani	9
10	(Thailand) Ekkapon Nammuntree	Krung Thonburi	9
10	(Ghana) Victor Paintsil	Kasem Bundit University	9

=== Hat-tricks ===
Player	For	Against	Result	Date
(South Korea) Lee Min-kyu^{4}	Krung Thonburi	Simork	6–1	26 February 2017
(United States) Diego Barrera	Kasem Bundit University	Rajpracha	4–2	25 March 2017
(Japan) Hiroyuki Sugimoto	Chamchuri United	Banbueng	4–0	30 April 2017
(Brazil) Thales Lima	Samut Sakhon	Bangkok University Deffo	5–0	13 May 2017
(Ivory Coast) Soumahoro Mafa	Surat Thani	Rajpracha	5–2	13 May 2017
(Thailand) Anusak Laosangthai	Bangkok University Deffo	Rajpracha	5–1	19 August 2017

== Attendances ==
=== Overall statistical table ===
Pos	Team	Total	High	Low	Average	Change
1	Samut Sakhon	18,184	1,625	825	1,298	n/a
2	Nara United	12,555	2,500	420	965	n/a
3	Trang	9,206	1,200	247	657	n/a
4	Ranong United	6,445	700	300	460	n/a
5	Chamchuri United	6,195	2,900	65	442	n/a
6	MOF Customs United	4,367	500	150	311	n/a
7	Surat Thani	4,341	519	169	310	n/a
8	Krung Thonburi	3,810	700	138	272	n/a
9	Banbueng	3,318	750	120	237	n/a
10	Royal Thai Army	2,965	437	126	211	n/a
11	Rajpracha	2,820	350	70	201	n/a
12	Kasem Bundit University	2,525	400	100	194	n/a
13	Simork	2,436	350	100	187	n/a
14	Nakhon Si Thammarat Unity	2,255	350	50	161	n/a
15	Bangkok University Deffo	2,212	346	23	158	n/a
	League total	83,634	2,900	23	404	n/a

Updated to games played on 16 September 2017
Source: Thai League 3

=== Attendances by home match played ===
Team \ Match played	1	2	3	4	5	6	7	8	9	10	11	12	13	14	Total
Banbueng	239	200	174	250	267	256	200	141	750	250	120	145	175	151	3,318
Bangkok University Deffo	150	63	250	150	250	346	23	100	30	150	100	200	200	200	2,212
Chamchuri United	250	180	300	500	400	250	200	200	250	200	65	200	300	2,900	6,195
Kasem Bundit University	300	Unk.1	200	400	150	150	200	200	100	200	150	200	155	120	2,525
Krung Thonburi	700	298	228	252	164	350	250	164	398	300	172	138	180	216	3,810
MOF Customs United	300	500	300	356	300	150	380	300	150	321	300	410	400	200	4,367
Nakhon Si Thammarat Unity	214	350	195	90	100	77	200	250	200	110	97	50	142	180	2,255
Nara United	2,500	1,500	1,300	1,000	783	744	1,000	600	800	445	1,000	420	463	Unk.3	12,555
Rajpracha	350	280	150	150	350	150	120	200	160	200	240	70	200	200	2,820
Ranong United	500	600	350	380	700	300	500	450	300	400	545	300	520	600	6,445
Royal Thai Army	229	437	159	153	149	225	134	289	214	210	235	220	185	126	2,965
Samut Sakhon	1,239	1,365	1,429	1,189	1,319	1,219	1,460	1,050	1,379	825	1,245	1,375	1,465	1,625	18,184
Simork	200	245	129	115	136	259	Unk.2	350	250	100	156	220	156	120	2,436
Surat Thani	519	367	249	396	329	317	187	198	300	347	219	349	169	395	4,341
Trang	600	1,200	649	247	1,200	280	600	700	850	900	480	500	500	500	9,206

Source: Thai League 3
Note:
Unk.1 Some error of T3 official match report 25 March 2017 (Kasem Bundit University 4–2 Rajpracha).
Unk.2 Some error of T3 official match report 2 July 2017 (Simork 3–0 Krung Thonburi).
Unk.3 Some error of T3 official match report 10 September 2017 (Nara United 1–3 Samut Sakhon).

== See also ==
- 2017 Thai League
- 2017 Thai League 2
- 2017 Thai League 3
- 2017 Thai League 4
- 2017 Thai FA Cup
- 2017 Thai League Cup
- 2017 Thai League 3 Upper Region
