= 2013 Regional League Division 2 Central & Western Region =

Regional League Central & Western Region
- Season: 2013

2013 Regional League Division 2 Central & Western Region is the 1st season of the League competition since its establishment in 2013. It is in the third tier of the Thai football league system.

== Changes from last season ==
=== Team changes ===
==== Promoted clubs ====
No club was promoted

==== Relegated clubs from 2012 Yamaha League-1 ====
- Raj Pracha relegated from the 2012 Yamaha League-1.

==== Relocated clubs ====
- Ang Thong, Muangkan, Phetchaburi, Prachuap Khiri Khan, Looktabfah F.C. re-located to the Regional League Central-West Division from the Central & Eastern Division 2012.
- Singburi re-located to the Regional League Central-West Division from the Northern Division 2012.
- Globlex, Krung Thonburi, Thonburi BG United, Samut Sakhon re-located to the Regional League Central-West Division from the Bangkok Area Division 2012.

==== Renamed clubs ====
- Raj Pracha renamed Raj Pracha BTU

==== Expansion clubs ====
- Hua Hin City, Futera Seeker joined the newly expanded league setup.

== Stadium and locations ==
Locations of the Regional League Central & Eastern Region Teams
Football clubs in Bangkok Metropolitan Region

Team	Location	Stadium	Capacity	Ref.
Ang Thong	Ang Thong	Ang Thong Administrative Organization Stadium	5,500	
Globlex	Bangkok	Ramkhamhaeng University Stadium	6,000	
Hua Hin City	Prachuap Khiri Khan	Thanaratchata Camp Football Field	3,500	
Krung Thonburi	Nakhon Pathom	Mahidol Salaya Stadium	2,000	
Grakcu Looktabfah Pathumthani	Pathum Thani	Thupatemee Stadium	20,000	
Muangkan United	Kanchanaburi	Kanchanaburi Stadium	13,000	
Prachuap	Prachuap Khiri Khan	Sam Ao Stadium	7,000	
Phetchaburi	Tha Yang, Phetchaburi	Thayang municipality Stadium	?	
Raj Pracha BTU	Nakhon Pathom	Rajamangala University of Technology Rattanakosin Salaya Campus Stadium	2,000	
Genufood Samut Sakhon	Samut Sakhon	Samut Sakhon Province Stadium	3,000	
Seeker Futera	Pathum Thani	Rajamangala University of Technology Thanyaburi Satadium	?	
Singburi	Singburi	Singburi Province Stadium	3,449	
Thonburi BG United	Bangkok	Thonburi University Stadium	?	

== League table ==
Pos	Team	Pld	W	D	L	GF	GA	GD	Pts	Qualification
1	Ang Thong (C, Q)	24	15	3	6	44	22	+22	48	Champions League Round
2	Prachuap (Q)	24	13	7	4	34	19	+15	46	Champions League Round
3	Grakcu Looktabfah Pathumthani	24	10	9	5	38	28	+10	39	
4	Seeker Futera	24	10	7	7	38	30	+8	37	
5	Muangkan United	24	10	7	7	33	28	+5	37	
6	Raj Pracha BTU	24	11	3	10	47	39	+8	36	
7	Phetchaburi	24	9	6	9	35	28	+7	33	
8	Genufood Samut Sakhon	24	8	9	7	30	35	−5	33	
9	Hua Hin City	24	6	14	4	28	24	+4	32	
10	Singburi	24	7	4	13	27	42	−15	25	
11	Krung Thonburi	24	5	8	11	28	35	−7	23	
12	Thonburi BG United	24	4	8	12	18	31	−13	20	
13	Globlex	24	2	6	16	21	59	−38	12	

Updated to match(es) played on 15 September 2013. Source:
Rules for classification: 1) points; 2) head-to-head points; 3) head-to-head goal difference; 4) head-to-head goals scored; 5) goal difference; 6) number of goals scored.
(C) Champions; (Q) Qualified for the phase indicated
