= 2016 Regional League Division 2 Western Region =

Regional League Western Region
- Season: 2016
- Champions: Samut Sakhon
- Relegated: Thonburi City
- Matches: 132
- Goals: 328 (2.48 per match)
- Top goalscorer: Aliou Seck (12 Goals)
- Biggest home win: Assumption United 7–0 Thonburi City (4 September 2016)
- Biggest away win: Thonburi City 0–5 Krung Thonburi (20 March 2016)
- Highest scoring: Chumphon 5–3 Assumption United (29 May 2016)
- Longest winning run: 5 Matches; Samut Sakhon
- Longest unbeaten run: 9 Matches; Samut Sakhon

2016 Regional League Division 2 Western Region is the 4th season of the League competition since its establishment in 2013. It is in the third tier of the Thai football league system.

== Changes from last season ==
=== Break zone clubs ===
Nonthaburi, Krung Thonburi, Globlex, Ratchaphruek College, Thonburi City, Samut Sakhon, Hua Hin City and Simork are broken from Central & Western Region

=== Team changes ===
==== Promoted clubs ====
No club was promoted to the Thai Division 1 League. Last years league champions Samut Sakhon and runners up Thonburi City failed to qualify from the 2015 Regional League Division 2 championsleague round.

==== Returning clubs ====
Muangkan United is returning to the league after a 1-year break.

==== Relocated clubs ====
- Assumption United re-located to the Regional League West Division from the Bangkok Area Division 2015.
- Chumphon re-located to the Regional League West Division from the South Division 2015.
- Grakcu Tabfah Pathum Thani were moved to the Bangkok Region.
- PTU Pathum Thani Seeker were moved to the Central Region.
- Raj Pracha were moved to the Bangkok & Eastern Region.

==== Renamed clubs ====
- Ratchaphruek Muengnon United renamed Ratchaphruek College again.
- Globlex TWD renamed BTU United

==== Withdrawn clubs ====
- Phetchaburi have withdrawn from the 2016 campaign.

=== Expansion clubs ===
IPE Samut Sakhon Promoted from Khǒr Royal Cup (ถ้วย ข.) 2015 Champion

== Stadium and locations ==
Locations of the 2016 Regional League Division 2 Central & Western Region Teams

Team	Location	Stadium	Capacity	Ref.
Assumption United	Nonthaburi	Assumption Thonburi School Stadium (Wongprachanukul Stadium)	1,000	
BTU United	Bangkok	Bangkok-Thonburi University Stadium	5,000	
Chumphon	Chumphon	IPE Chumphon Stadium	3,000	
IPE Samut Sakhon United	Samut Sakhon	IPE Samut Sakhon Stadium	6,000	
Hua Hin City	Prachuap Khiri Khan	Khao Takiap Stadium	3,500	
Krung Thonburi	Nakhon Pathom	Mahidol University Salaya Campus Stadium	2,000	
Muangkan United	Kanchanaburi	Kleab Bua Stadium	13,000	
Nonthaburi	Nonthaburi	Nonthaburi Sports Complex Stadium	10,000	
Ratchaphruek University	Bangkok	Thonburi University Stadium	?	
Samut Sakhon	Samut Sakhon	Samut Sakhon Province Stadium	?	
Simork	Suphanburi	Suphanburi Sports School Stadium	1,500	
Thonburi City	Bangkok	Bang Bon Sport Center	5,000	

Football clubs in Bangkok Metropolitan Region

== League table ==
Pos	Team	Pld	W	D	L	GF	GA	GD	Pts	Promotion or relegation
1	Samut Sakhon (C, Q)	22	13	4	5	30	22	+8	43	Qualification to Champions League Round and Promotion to Thai League Championship
2	Krung Thonburi (Q)	22	12	5	5	38	19	+19	41	Qualification to Champions League Round and Promotion to Thai League Championship
3	Ratchaphruek University (P)	22	12	4	6	38	22	+16	40	Promotion to Thai League Championship
4	Simork (P)	22	11	5	6	38	22	+16	38	Promotion to Thai League Championship
5	BTU United (P)	22	10	6	6	32	22	+10	36	Promotion to Thai League Championship
6	Nonthaburi	22	9	5	8	28	28	0	32	
7	Chumphon	22	8	7	7	28	25	+3	31	
8	Hua Hin City	22	6	8	8	19	23	−4	26	
9	Assumption United	22	5	10	7	25	26	−1	25	
10	Muangkan United	22	6	4	12	18	35	−17	22	
11	IPE Samut Sakhon	22	4	4	14	21	40	−19	16	
12	Thonburi City (R)	22	3	4	15	17	48	−31	13	Relegation to Thai Football Division 3

Source: Division 2
Rules for classification: 1) points; 2) head-to-head points; 3) head-to-head goal difference; 4) head-to-head goals scored; 5) goal difference; 6) number of goals scored.
(C) Champions; (P) Promoted; (Q) Qualified for the phase indicated; (R) Relegated

== Results ==
Home \ Away	ASS	BTU	CHU	HUA	IPE	KRU	MKU	NON	RAT	SAM	SIM	THO
Assumption United		1–1	1–1	2–1	0–0	1–1	1–0	1–1	0–1	1–1	1–0	7–0
BTU United	4–1		1–1	2–0	2–0	2–1	1–1	4–0	2–1	0–1	0–1	3–2
Chumphon	5–3	1–0		1–1	3–2	1–3	3–1	2–0	0–2	0–1	0–1	2–1
Hua Hin City	1–1	2–1	1–0		1–1	1–2	1–0	0–1	0–0	0–0	2–2	1–1
IPE Samut Sakhon	1–1	1–2	0–3	1–0		3–2	0–1	1–2	1–4	1–1	2–3	2–0
Krung Thonburi	0–1	0–0	0–0	2–0	2–0		2–0	3–1	1–0	5–2	3–2	2–0
Muangkan United	1–0	2–0	2–2	1–1	0–2	2–1		2–3	0–0	3–1	0–3	1–0
Nonthaburi	1–1	0–1	0–0	1–2	2–1	1–0	1–0		2–0	1–3	0–0	6–0
Ratchaphruek University	2–1	0–0	4–1	3–2	4–1	0–0	5–0	3–0		3–1	1–3	3–2
Samut Sakhon	1–0	4–2	0–0	1–0	3–1	1–2	1–0	2–0	2–0		1–0	0–2
Simork	3–0	0–2	1–0	0–1	3–0	1–1	5–1	2–2	3–1	0–1		3–1
Thonburi City	0–0	2–2	0–2	0–1	1–0	0–5	2–0	0–3	0–1	1–2	2–2	

Updated to match(es) played on 4 September 2016. Source: Division 2
Legend: Blue = home team win; Yellow = draw; Red = away team win.

== Season statistics ==
=== Top scorers ===
As of 4 September 2016.

Rank	Player	Club	Goals
1	(Senegal) Aliou Seck	Samut Sakhon	12
2	(Nigeria) Kingsley Obioma	Krung Thonburi	11
3	(Thailand) Jatuchai Thongbut	Krung Thonburi	10
3	(Thailand) Sirimongkhon Jitbanjong	Simork	10
5	(South Korea) Song Il-eum	BTU United	8
5	(Japan) Yoshinari Sato	Chumphon	8
5	(Ghana) John Sam	Nonthaburi	8
5	(Thailand) Yodsak Chaowana	Assumption United	8
5	(Ghana) Samuel Ampofo	Ratchaphruek University	8
10	(Ghana) Issac Nikwei	Ratchaphruek University	7
10	(Cameroon) Moussa Abakar	Simork	7
