= 2015 Regional League Division 2 Central & Western Region =

Regional League Central & Western Region
- Season: 2015
- Champions: Samut Sakhon
- Matches: 146
- Goals: 388 (2.66 per match)
- Biggest home win: Hua Hin 6–0 PTU (29 March 2015)
- Biggest away win: PTU 1–6 Samut Sakhon (4 April 2015)
- Highest scoring: Looktabfah 4–3 Globlex (15 February 2015)
- Longest winning run: 7 games Samut Sakhon
- Longest unbeaten run: 13 games Simork

2015 Regional League Division 2 Central & Western Region is the 3rd season of the League competition since its establishment in 2013. It is in the third tier of the Thai football league system.

== Changes from last season ==
=== Team changes ===
==== Promoted clubs ====
No club was promoted to the Thai Division 1 League. Last years league champions Hua Hin and runners up Phetchaburi failed to qualify from the 2014 Regional League Division 2 championsleague round.

==== Relocated clubs ====
- Singburi moved into the 2015 Thai Division 2 League Northern Region.

==== Renamed clubs ====
- J.W. BU renamed J.W. Police.
- Seeker renamed PTU Pathum Thani Seeker.
- Globlex F.C. renamed Globlex TWD.

==== Withdrawn clubs ====
Muangkan United have withdrawn from the 2015 campaign.

=== Expansion clubs ===
Simork joined the newly expanded league setup.

== Stadium and locations ==
Locations of the 2015 Central & Western Region Teams
Football clubs in Bangkok Metropolitan Region

Team	Location	Stadium	Capacity	Ref.
Globlex TWD	Bangkok	Ramkhamhaeng University Stadium	5,000	
Hua Hin City	Prachuap Khiri Khan	Thanaratchata Camp Football Field	3,500	
J.W. Police	Bangkok	Boonyachinda Stadium	2,000	
Krung Thonburi	Nakhon Pathom	Mahidol University Salaya Campus Stadium	2,000	
Grakcu Tabfah Pathum Thani	Pathum Thani	Thupatemee Stadium	20,000	
Nonthaburi	Nonthaburi	Nonthaburi Provincial Stadium (Wat Bot Don Prom)	1,300	
Phetchaburi	Phetchaburi	Phetchaburi Province Stadium	6,575	
PTU Pathum Thani Seeker	Pathum Thani	Valaya Alongkorn Rajabhat University Stadium	1,000	
Raj Pracha	Bangkok	King Mongkut's Institute of Technology Ladkrabang Stadium	?	
Ratchaphruek Muengnon United	Nonthaburi	Rajamangala University of Technology Rattanakosin Salaya Campus Stadium	?	
Samut Sakhon	Samut Sakhon	Samut Sakhon Province Stadium	?	
Simork	Suphan Buri	Suphanburi Sports School Stadium	1,500	
Thonburi City	Bangkok	Thonburi University Stadium	?	

== League table ==
Pos	Team	Pld	W	D	L	GF	GA	GD	Pts	Qualification
1	Samut Sakhon (C, Q)	24	16	4	4	42	16	+26	52	Champions League Round
2	Thonburi City (Q)	24	16	3	5	42	21	+21	51 (Note: SIM 1–1 THO; THO 2–0 SIM)	Champions League Round
3	Simork	24	14	9	1	40	16	+24	51	
4	Krung Thonburi	24	12	6	6	25	15	+10	42 (Note: KRU 2–0 HUA; HUA 1–3 KRU)	
5	Hua Hin	24	12	6	6	38	22	+16	42	
6	Raj Pracha	24	11	6	7	35	22	+13	39	
7	J.W. Police	24	8	6	10	34	40	−6	30	
8	Phetchaburi	24	7	7	10	24	31	−7	28	
9	Grakcu Tabfah	24	5	8	11	23	31	−8	23	
10	PTU Pathum Thani Seeker	24	5	6	13	19	47	−28	21	
11	Ratchaphruek Muengnon	24	5	4	15	22	39	−17	19	
12	Globlex TWD	24	4	6	14	28	45	−17	18	
13	Nonthaburi	24	3	5	16	20	47	−27	14	

Rules for classification: 1) points; 2) head-to-head points; 3) head-to-head goal difference; 4) head-to-head goals scored; 5) goal difference; 6) number of goals scored.
(C) Champions; (Q) Qualified for the phase indicated
