= 2014 Regional League Division 2 Central & Western Region =

Regional League Central & Western Region
- Season: 2014
- Champions: Hua Hin

2014 Regional League Division 2 Central & Western Region is the 2nd season of the League competition since its establishment in 2013. It is in the third tier of the Thai football league system.

== Changes from last season ==
=== Team changes ===
==== Promoted clubs ====
Ang Thong were promoted to the 2014 Thai Division 1 League.

==== Relocated clubs ====
- Nonthaburi re-located to the Regional League Central-West Division from the Bangkok Area Division 2013.
- Prachuap moved into the Southern Division 2014.
- Thonburi BG United moved into the Bangkok & field Division 2014.

=== Expansion clubs ===
J.W. Group, Ratchaphruek and Thonburi City joined the newly expanded league setup.

==== Renamed clubs ====
- Futera Seeker renamed Seeker.

== Stadium and locations ==
Locations of the 2014 Regional League Central & Eastern Region Teams
Football clubs in Bangkok Metropolitan Region

| Team | Location | Stadium | Capacity | Ref. |
|---|---|---|---|---|
| Globlex TWD | Bangkok | Ramkhamhaeng University Stadium | 2,000 | |
| Hua Hin | Prachuap Khiri Khan | Thanaratchata Camp Football Field | 3,500 | |
| J.W. BU | Pathum Thani | Bangkok University Stadium | 5,000 | |
| Krung Thonburi | Nakhon Pathom | Mahidol University Stadium (Salaya) | 2,000 | |
| Grakcu Looktabfah | Pathum Thani | Thupatemee Stadium | 20,000 | |
| Muangkan United | Kanchanaburi | Kleab Bua Stadium | 13,000 | |
| Nonthaburi | Nonthaburi | Nonthaburi Provincial Stadium (Wat Bot Don Prom) | 1,300 | |
| Phetchaburi | Phetchaburi | Phetchaburi Province Stadium | 6,575 | |
| Raj Pracha BTU | Bangkok | Bangkok-Thonburi University Stadium | ? | |
| Ratchaphruek Muangnont United | Nonthaburi Pathum Thani | Photinimit witthayakhom Stadium Chaloem Phra Kiat Stadium (Khlong 6) | ? ? | |
| Samut Sakhon | Samut Sakhon | Samut Sakhon Province Stadium | 3,000 | |
| Seeker | Bangkok Bang Khen, Bangkok | National Housing Authority Stadium (Klongchan Stadium) Boonyachinda Stadium | ? | |
| Singburi | Singburi | Singburi Province Stadium | 3,449 | |
| Thonburi City | Bangkok | Thonburi University Stadium | ? | |

== League table ==
| Pos | Team | Pld | W | D | L | GF | GA | GD | Pts | Qualification |
|---|---|---|---|---|---|---|---|---|---|---|
| 1 | Hua Hin (C, Q) | 26 | 15 | 6 | 5 | 45 | 19 | +26 | 51 | Champions League Round |
| 2 | Phetchaburi (Q) | 26 | 14 | 7 | 5 | 37 | 24 | +13 | 49 | Champions League Round |
| 3 | Muangkan United | 26 | 13 | 9 | 4 | 31 | 16 | +15 | 48 | |
| 4 | Samut Sakhon | 26 | 14 | 6 | 6 | 38 | 29 | +9 | 48 | |
| 5 | Singburi | 26 | 12 | 6 | 8 | 42 | 38 | +4 | 42 | |
| 6 | Looktabfah | 26 | 9 | 10 | 7 | 41 | 30 | +11 | 37 | |
| 7 | Ratchaphruek Muangnont United | 26 | 10 | 6 | 10 | 40 | 38 | +2 | 36 | |
| 8 | Thonburi City | 26 | 8 | 9 | 9 | 28 | 29 | −1 | 33 | |
| 9 | Krung Thonburi | 26 | 9 | 6 | 11 | 20 | 22 | −2 | 33 | |
| 10 | Raj Pracha | 26 | 7 | 8 | 11 | 34 | 43 | −9 | 29 | |
| 11 | Nonthaburi | 26 | 6 | 9 | 11 | 23 | 31 | −8 | 27 | |
| 12 | J.W. BU | 26 | 6 | 5 | 15 | 23 | 39 | −16 | 23 | |
| 13 | Globlex | 26 | 4 | 8 | 14 | 26 | 45 | −19 | 20 | |
| 14 | Seeker | 26 | 4 | 6 | 16 | 29 | 55 | −26 | 18 | |

Source: ^{[usurped]}
Rules for classification: 1) points; 2) head-to-head points; 3) head-to-head goal difference; 4) head-to-head goals scored; 5) goal difference; 6) number of goals scored.
(C) Champions; (Q) Qualified for the phase indicated
