= Regional League Western Division =

- Founded: 2013; 13 years ago
- Folded: 2017; 9 years ago
- Country: Thailand
- Number of clubs: 12
- Level on pyramid: 3
- Promotion to: Regional League Division 2
- Domestic cup(s): Thai FA Cup; Thai League Cup
- Last champions: Samut Sakhon (2016)
- Website: http://www.d2.in.th
- Current: 2016

Regional League Western Division Regional League Central-Western Division is the 3rd Level League in Thailand. It was formed in 2013 along with four other regional leagues, all playing at the same level. The winner of each regional league enters the Regional League Championships to determine the three teams that will receive promotion to the Thai Division 1 League.

== League history ==
Formed in 2013, 13 clubs applied to be part of the new setup: Ang Thong, Globlex, Hua Hin City, Krung Thonburi, Looktabfah, Muangkan United, Prachuap Khiri Khan, Phetchaburi, Raj Pracha Bangkokthonburi, Samut Sakhon, Seeker Futera, Singburi, and Thonburi BG United.

== Timeline ==
Year	Important events	Participating clubs
2013	1st ever Regional League Central-West starts.	13

== Championship History ==
Season	Winner	Runner up	Third place
2013	Ang Thong	Prachuap Khiri Khan	Looktabfah
2014	Hua Hin	Phetchaburi	Muangkan United
2015	Samut Sakhon	Thonburi City	Simork
2016	Samut Sakhon	Krung Thonburi	Ratchaphruek University

== Member clubs ==
Club	Province	Years
Ang Thong	Ang Thong	2013
BTU United	Bangkok	2013–present
Hua Hin City	Prachuap Khiri Khan	2013–present
Krung Thonburi	Nakhon Pathom	2013–present
Looktabfah	Pathum Thani	2013–2015
Muangkan United	Kanchanaburi	2013–present
Prachuap Khiri Khan	Prachuap Khiri Khan	2013
Phetchaburi	Phetchaburi	2013–present
Raj Pracha	Bangkok	2013–2015
Samut Sakhon	Samut Sakhon	2013–present
PTU Pathum Thani Seeker	Pathum Thani	2013–2015
Singburi	Singburi	2013–2014
Thonburi BG United	Pathum Thani	2013
J.W. Group	Bangkok	2014–2015
Ratchaphruek	Nonthaburi	2014–present
Nonthaburi	Nonthaburi	2014–present
Thonburi City	Bangkok	2014–present
Simork	Suphanburi	2015–present
Assumption United	Bangkok	2016–present
Chumphon	Chumphon	2016–present
IPE Samut Sakhon	Samut Sakhon	2016–present
