= Wuthipong Sitthithunkij =

Thai footballer (born 1988)

Personal information
- Full name: Wuthipong Sitthithunkij
- Date of birth: January 26, 1988 (age 38)
- Place of birth: Bangkok, Thailand
- Height: 1.73 m (5 ft 8 in)
- Position: Midfielder

Team information
- Current team: Ubon UMT United
- Number: 20

Youth career
- Assumption College Thonburi

Senior career*
Years	Team	Apps	(Gls)
2007	Muangthong United		
2008–2012	Raj Pracha		
2013	Phuket F.C.		
2014	Customs United F.C.		
2015–2016	Ubon UMT United		
- * Club domestic league appearances and goals

Wuthipong Sitthithunkij (Thai: วุฒิพงษ์ สิทธิธัญกิจ, born January 26, 1988), simply known as Wut (Thai: วุฒิ), is a Thai professional footballer.

== Honor ==
=== Club ===
Ubon UMT United

- Regional League Division 2:
  - Winners : 2015
- Regional League North-East Division
  - Runner-up : 2015
