= 2012 Regional League Division 2 Bangkok Metropolitan Region =

Regional League Bangkok Area Division
- Season: 2012
- Champions: Thai Honda; 1st title
- Relegated: Central Lions; Nonthaburi
- Matches: 306
- Goals: 793 (2.59 per match)
- Biggest home win: RBAC BEC Tero Sasana 6-0 Bangkok Christian College (4 March 2012); Customs United 6-0 Globlex (22 September 2012)
- Biggest away win: Globlex 0-6 Samut Prakan United (7 April 2012)
- Highest scoring: Rangsit 6-4 Samut Prakan United (30 March 2012); North Bangkok College 6-4 Nonthaburi (29 July 2012) (10 goals)

2012 Regional League Division 2 Bangkok Metropolitan Region is the 4th season of the League competition since its establishment in 2009. It is in the third tier of the Thai football league system.

== Changes from last season ==
=== Team changes ===
==== Promoted clubs ====
No club was promoted to the Thai Division 1 League. Last years league champions Kasetsart University and runners up North Bangkok College failed to qualify from the 2011 Regional League Division 2 championship pool.

==== Relegated clubs ====
RBAC Mittraphap, Samut Prakan Customs United and Thai Honda were relegated from the 2011 Thai Division 1 League.

==== Renamed clubs ====
- RBAC Mittraphap renamed RBAC BEC Tero Sasana.
- Samut Prakan Customs United renamed Customs United whom they were known as in the 2009 league campaign.
- Prachinburi renamed Rayong United. and move to Rayong province

==== Relocated clubs ====
Samut Sakhon re-located to the Regional League Bangkok Area Division from the Regional League Central-East Region 2011.

Maptaphut Rayong, Royal Thai Fleet, Thanyaburi United have all been moved into the Central-East Region 2012

Paknampho NSRU moved into the Division 2 League Northern Region 2012

==== Withdrawn clubs ====
Raj-Vithi have withdrawn from the 2012 campaign.

==== Returning clubs ====
Central Lions (previously known as (North-Central) is returning to the league.

==== Expansion clubs ====
Krung Thonburi, Rangsit

== Stadium and locations ==
Locations of the Thai Premier League 2012 teams
Football clubs in Bangkok Metropolitan Region

Team	Location	Stadium	Capacity	Ref.
Assumption Thonburi	Thonburi, Bangkok	Assumption Thonburi School Stadium (Wongprachanukul Stadium)	1,000	
Bangkok Christian College	Pathum Wan, Bangkok	Thephasadin Stadium	6,738	
Central Lions	Nakhon Pathom Pathum Thani; Nong Chok, Bangkok	RMUTR Stadium Thupatemi Stadium; BEC Tero Sasana Nong Chok Stadium	2,000 25,000; 5,000	
Chamchuri United	Pathumwan, Bangkok	Chulalongkorn University Sports Stadium	25,000	
Customs United	Bang Sao Thong, Samut Prakan	Lad Krabang 54 Stadium	?	
Globlex	Bang Kapi, Bangkok	Ramkhamhaeng University Stadium	2,000	
Kasem Bundit University	Min Buri, Bangkok	Kasem Bundit University Stadium	2,000	
Kasetsart	Nakhon Pathom	Kasetsart University Kamphaeng Saen Campus Stadium	4,000	
Krung Thonburi	Nakhon Pathom	Mahidol University Salaya Campus Stadium	1,000	
Look Isan-Thai Airways	Bang Kapi, Bangkok Lak Si, Bangkok	Ramkhamhaeng University Stadium; Bunyajinda Stadium	2,000; 3,500	
Nonthaburi	Nonthaburi	Nonthaburi Provincial Stadium (Wat Bot Don Prom)	1,300	
North Bangkok University	Pathum Thani	North Bangkok University Rangsit Campus Stadium	1,000	
Rayong United	Klaeng, Rayong	Klaeng municipality Stadium	1,500	
Rangsit	Pathum Thani	Leo Stadium	12,000	
RBAC BEC Tero Sasana	Bang Kapi, Bangkok	RBAC University Stadium	1,000	
Samut Prakan United	Samut Prakan	Samut Prakan United Stadium	?	
Samut Sakhon	Samut Sakhon	Samut Sakhon Province Stadium	3,000	
Thai Honda	Lat Krabang, Bangkok	King Mongkut's Institute of Technology Ladkrabang Stadium	3,500	

== League table ==
Pos	Team	Pld	W	D	L	GF	GA	GD	Pts	Qualification or relegation
1	Thai Honda (C, Q)	34	21	8	5	57	33	+24	71	Champions League Round
2	Rayong United (Q)	34	19	10	5	54	29	+25	67	Champions League Round
3	RBAC-BEC Tero Sasana	34	19	8	7	72	34	+38	65 (Note: RBAC 2–1 KU; KU 0-1 RBAC)	
4	Kasetsart	34	19	8	7	58	32	+26	65	
5	Samut Sakhon	34	18	8	8	44	29	+15	62	
6	North Bangkok University	34	15	13	6	61	46	+15	58	
7	Chamchuri United	34	14	9	11	47	46	+1	51	
8	Samut Prakan United	34	13	11	10	50	37	+13	50	
9	Assumption Thonburi	34	11	12	11	33	30	+3	45	
10	Customs United	34	11	10	13	50	44	+6	43	
11	Rangsit	34	11	9	14	41	43	−2	42	
12	Krung Thonburi	34	11	7	16	40	46	−6	40	
13	Globlex	34	10	8	16	33	54	−21	38	
14	Kasem Bundit University	34	7	15	12	38	51	−13	36	
15	Look Isan-Thai Airways	34	7	9	18	32	55	−23	30	
16	Bangkok Christian College	34	5	13	16	28	53	−25	28	
17	Central Lions (R)	34	4	8	22	29	72	−43	20	Relegation to the Khǒr Royal Cup
18	Nonthaburi (R)	34	3	10	21	26	59	−33	19	Relegation to the Khǒr Royal Cup

Rules for classification: 1) points; 2) head-to-head points; 3) head-to-head goal difference; 4) head-to-head goals scored; 5) goal difference; 6) number of goals scored.
(C) Champions; (Q) Qualified for the phase indicated; (R) Relegated

== Results ==
Home \ Away	ACT	BCC	CTL	CHM	CSU	GLB	KBU	KST	KRT	NNB	NBC	RYU	RNG	RBAC	SPU	SMS	TAL	THD
Assumption Thonburi		0–0	0–0	2–3	1–0	0–0	2–2	1–1	0–0	1–0	0–2	1–0	1–2	1–2	1–0	1–1	0–1	3–0
Bangkok Christian College	0–2		1–0	2–2	0–1	0–3	0–0	2–2	1–0	1–0	1–1	1–3	2–1	2–5	0–1	0–1	1–1	1–1
Central Lions	0–4	1–0		1–1	0–2	1–2	2–3	1–4	0–3	0–0	2–4	1–5	2–1	2–1	2–0	2–3	1–3	1–5
Chamchuri United	1–2	0–0	4–3		2–1	2–1	2–2	0–1	2–0	0–0	2–1	0–1	0–0	1–1	2–1	1–2	4–1	2–1
Customs United	2–0	1–1	1–1	1–1			0–2	1–1	4–1	1–1	4–4	0–2	0–0	2–3	0–1	0–0	4–1	2–3
Globlex	1–1	0–2	3–2	1–3	1–3		0–0	0–0	1–2	0–2	1–2	1–0	3–2	0–0	0–6	0–0	2–1	0–1
Kasem Bundit University	2–1	1–0	0–0	1–2	2–1	0–1		0–2	1–3	4–2	1–2	1–1	2–2	3–2	0–0	1–2	1–1	1–1
Kasetsart University	2–1	1–1	2–0	2–0	2–1	1–0	5–1		3–2	2–0	3–2	1–2	4–1	0–1	0–0	3–2	0–0	1–0
Krung Thonburi	0–0	2–2	1–0	2–1	0–1	0–3	2–2	0–1		4–1	0–2	1–4	1–0	2–3	3–1	1–0	1–1	0–1
Nonthaburi	1–3	0–0	1–1	1–3	1–2	1–3	0–0	1–4	1–0		0–0	1–2	1–1	2–3	1–1	0–1	0–2	1–2
North Bangkok College	0–1	5–1	4–0	3–2	3–1	2–1	1–1	1–1	3–1	6–4		2–2	2–3	0–0	0–5	2–0	1–1	0–0
Rayong United	2–0	3–2	2–0	0–0	0–0	1–1	1–0	2–1	0–3	1–0	3–2		1–0	1–1	1–0	1–1	5–0	1–1
Rangsit	0–1	3–1	0–0	0–1	0–1	0–0	3–0	2–1	1–0	1–1	0–1	1–0		0–0	6–4	2–1	2–2	0–1
RBAC BEC Tero Sasana	0–0	6–0	5–0	6–1	2–0	4–0	2–0	2–1	0–0	4–0	4–0	1–2	3–1		2–0	3–1	4–2	0–1
Samut Prakan United	0–0	2–1	1–1	3–1	2–2	2–1	1–1	1–2	2–0	1–0	1–1	2–2	1–2	2–1		0–1	2–0	1–1
Samut Sakhon	2–0	1–1	2–0	2–0	2–0	4–1	2–0	2–0	2–1	0–2	0–1	1–2	1–0	1–1	1–1		1–0	1–1
Thai Airways-Look Isan	0–0	1–0	1–0	0–1	1–3	1–2	3–3	0–3	0–2	2–0	0–0	0–1	1–2	3–0	0–3	1–2		1–3
Thai Honda	3–2	2–1	3–2	1–0	3–2	2–0	2–0	2–1	2–2	3–0	1–1	2–1	3–2	3–0	1–2	0–1	1–0	

Legend: Blue = home team win; Yellow = draw; Red = away team win.
