= Thonburi City F.C. =

Thai football club

Thonburi City ธนบุรี ซิตี้
- Full name: Thonburi City Football Club สโมสรฟุตบอลธนบุรี ซิตี้
- Nicknames: King Cobra (ราชันจงอาง)
- Founded: 2013; 13 years ago
- Ground: 84th Anniversary Stadium (Bang Bon); Bangkok, Thailand
- Capacity: 5,000
- Chairman: Sakthat Tiansiripithak
- Head Coach: Sompok Udomsiri
- League: 2018 Thailand Amateur League Western Region

Thonburi City Football Club (Thai: สโมสรฟุตบอลธนบุรี ซิตี้), is a Thai professional football club based in Thonburi, Bangkok. The club was founded in 2013. They currently play in 2018 Thailand Amateur League Western Region.

== History ==
Thonburi City was established in 2014 as a 'pilot club' to replace Laem Chabang F.C., which was ended at the last place of the previous season of Bangkok and field region. The club started its first season at the Central & Western Region, where is the same region with their regional rival Krung Thonburi F.C. 'King Cobra' used Thonburi Stadium as its temporary home ground due to 84th Birthday Anniversary of His Majesty the King Sport Club was still under maintenance. King Cobra ended their first season with the 8th place of the region with 33 points, edged the ninth-placed Krung Thonburi F.C. which had the same number of obtained points by Head-to-Head results.

In 2015, King Cobra got its first achievement as it won the second place of the Central & Western Region and qualified to the Champions League Group stage. However, the club ended their season at the sixth place, and they failed to qualify to the 2016 Division 1.

In 2016, King Cobra moved to 84th Birthday Anniversary of His Majesty the King Sport Club first season and affiliated with Port F.C., but King Cobra started their season with a 0–5 thrashed to regional rival in first match of the league. Then, King Cobra made their bad performance till they ended up at the last place of Western region and relegated to Thai Football Division 3 next season.

In 2017, Thonburi City played in 2016 Thai Division 3 Tournament Central Region and failed in Third round.

In 2018, Thonburi City played in 2018 Thailand Amateur League Western Region.

== Stadium and locations ==
Coordinates	Location	Stadium	Capacity	Year
13°43′27″N 100°20′42″E	Bangkok	Thonburi University Stadium	?	2014–2015
13°38′40″N 100°23′50″E	Bangkok	84th Anniversary Stadium (Bang Bon)	5,000	2016

== Season By Season record ==
Season	League									FA Cup	League Cup	Top goalscorer	
Season	Division	P	W	D	L	F	A	Pts	Pos	FA Cup	League Cup	Name	Goals
2014	DIV 2 Central & West	26	8	9	9	28	29	33	8th				
2015	DIV 2 Central & West	24	16	3	5	42	21	51	2nd	Not Enter	QR1		
2016	DIV 2 West	22	3	4	5	17	48	13	12	Not Enter	QR1		
2017	DIV 3 Central	3	1	1	1	4	3	4	17th – 32nd	Not Enter	Can't Enter		
2017	TA Central	7	1	1	5	7	27	4	11th – 12th	Not Enter	Can't Enter		
2018	TA West									Not Enter	Can't Enter		

Champions	Runners-up	Promoted	Relegated
