= Rapeepan Pulsawat =

Thai footballer (born 1982)

Personal information
- Full name: Rapeepan Pulsawat
- Date of birth: June 20, 1982 (age 44)
- Place of birth: Nakhon Pathom, Thailand
- Height: 1.66 m (5 ft 5 1/2 in)
- Position: Left back

Team information
- Current team: Chiangrai United
- Number: 25

Youth career
- 2002–2003: Nakhon Pathom

Senior career*
Years	Team	Apps	(Gls)
2004–2008	Nakhon Pathom	57	(1)
2008	Muangthong United	9	(0)
2009–2011	Chiangrai United	16	(0)
2012	Phuket	12	(0)
2013	Samut Sakhon	19	(0)
2014	Phayao	10	(0)
2015	Nonthaburi	19	(2)
2015–2016	Chiangmai	24	(0)
2017–	Nonthaburi	4	(0)
- * Club domestic league appearances and goals as of 22 June 2008

Rapeepan Pulsawat (Thai ระพีพันธุ์ พูลสวัสดิ์ ) is a Thai footballer. He plays for Thai League 4 clubside Nonthaburi.
