= Emmanuel Nwachi =

Nigerian footballer

Emma Nwachi
Personal information
- Full name: Emmanuel Ikechukwu Nwachi
- Date of birth: 10 October 1988 (age 38)
- Place of birth: Durbi, Nigeria
- Height: 1.80 m (5 ft 11 in)
- Position: Forward

Senior career*
Years	Team	Apps	(Gls)
2002–2004	Plateau United		
2005–2006	Kano Pillars	20	(0)
2007–2008	Sharks F.C.	7	(0)
2008–2009	Bayelsa United F.C.		
2009–2012	Dolphins FC		
2012	Suphanburi		
2014-2015	Thonburi City F.C.		
2016	Krung Thonburi F.C.		
2017	Nakhon Si Thammarat Unity F.C.		
2018	Surat Thani City		
2019–2020	Thonburi University	9	(1)
2020	Chainat United	2	(0)
2020–2021	Surat Thani City	11	(4)
2021–2022	Nara United	19	(5)

International career
2012	Nigeria		
- * Club domestic league appearances and goals

Emmanuel Ikechukwu Nwachi (born 10 October 1988 in Durbi) is a Nigerian football forward.

== Career ==
He began his career with Plateau United before transferred to Kano Pillars in 2005. He left Kano after two years and moved in January 2007 to Sharks F.C. On 13 October 2008, he left Sharks and moved to Bayelsa United F.C., helping them to a league title and securing a semi-final slot in the 2009 CAF Confederation Cup with the winning goal in the final group stage game at Stade Malien. Nwachi played on 16 January 2009 a training match for Start Kristiansand against Bryne FK. He joined Dolphins in September 2010.
