= Krongpol Daorueang =

Thai footballer and coach (born 1978)

Personal information
- Full name: Krongpol Daorueang
- Date of birth: 18 April 1975 (age 51)
- Place of birth: Thailand
- Height: 1.70 m (5 ft 7 in)
- Positions: Attacking midfielder; forward

Senior career*
Years	Team	Apps	(Gls)
1996–2001	Bangkok Bank F.C.		
2001	Balestier Central		(8)

International career
- Thailand

Managerial career
- 2024: Trat
- 2024–: Kasem Bundit University
- * Club domestic league appearances and goals

Krongpol Daorueang (Thai: ครองพล ดาวเรือง, born 18 April 1978) is a Thai football coach and former footballer who is the currently head coach of Thai League 3 side Kasem Bundit University.

He is last known to have lined up for Balestier Central of the Singapore S.League in 2001.

== Club career ==
=== Balestier Central ===
Moving to Balestier Central of the Singaporean S.League in 2001 following a one-week trial, Krongpol settled into the country well, sharing an apartment with teammates Josip Kozic and Fabio da Silva and putting in good displays for the club.

== Personal life ==
Throughout his days in Singapore, the Thai attacker was known for his cooking ability and succulent dishes, planning to open a restaurant in the near future.

== Managerial statistics ==
As of 5 October 2024

Managerial record by team and tenure
Team	Nat	From	To	Record							
Team	Nat	From	To	G	W	D	L	GF	GA	GD	Win %
Trat	(Thailand)	2 July 2024	8 October 2024	8	3	1	4	10	12	−2	37.50
Career total				8	3	1	4	10	12	−2	37.50
