= 2017 Thai League 3 Play-off Round =

2017 Thai League 3
- Season: 2017

Thai League 3 Play-off Round is last promotion quota of Thai League 2. Thai Football clubs, which is runner-up of 2017 Thai League 3 Upper Region and runner-up of 2017 Thai League 3 Lower Region, pass to 2017 Thai League 3 Play-off Round. This round plays Home-Away match. Thai Football clubs get more total scores when finish Home-Away match to promote Thai League 2. Away goals rule is used to this tournament.

== 3rd Position of Play-off round ==
Team 1	Agg.	Team 2	1st leg	2nd leg
Udon Thani	3 - 3	Trang	2-3	1-0

30 September 2017	Trang	3–2	Udon Thani	Trang
18:00 (UTC+7)	Adisak Khotchawat 28'; Giuber Ty Silva Neves 70' (pen.); Nasree Due-loh 89'	report	Sho Shimoji 59'; Valci Júnior 73'	Stadium: Trang City municipality Stadium; Attendance: 1,150; Referee: Phichit Na Suwan

8 October 2017	Udon Thani	1–0	Trang	Udon Thani
18:00 (UTC+7)	Valci Júnior 8'	report		Stadium: Udon Thani Rajabhat University Stadium; Referee: Chairoek Ngamsom

== 1st Position of Play-off round ==
Team 1	Agg.	Team 2	1st leg	2nd leg
Khonkaen	2 - 5	Samut Sakhon		

1 October 2017	Samut Sakhon	3–1	Khonkaen	Samut Sakhon
18:00 (UTC+7)	Welington Adao Gomes 37'; Thales Lima 65'; Thanakorn Wohanklong 90+5'	report	Darko Tasevski 84'	Stadium: Samut Sakhon IPE. Stadium; Referee: Tanakorn Yuraprasit

7 October 2017	Khonkaen	1–2	Samut Sakhon	Khonkaen
18:00 (UTC+7)	Darko Tasevski 68'	report	Thales Lima 4'; Porawat Siriwattanakorn 90+2'	Stadium: Khonkaen PAO. Stadium; Referee: Thattarawut Khanthawichai

== Winner ==
2017 Thai League 3
Samut Sakhon
1st title
