= Efe Jerry Obode =

Nigerian footballer

Efe Obode
Personal information
- Full name: Obode Jerry Valantine Efe
- Date of birth: February 14, 1989 (age 37)
- Place of birth: Nigeria
- Height: 1.77 m (5 ft 9 1/2 in)
- Position: Forward

Senior career*
Years	Team	Apps	(Gls)
2009–2010	Tishreen	0	(0)
2010–2011	Samut Songkhram	0	(0)
2011–2012	Erbil	0	(0)
2013–2014	Pattaya United	28	(4)
2014–2015	Trat	0	(0)
2015	Udon Thani	17	(2)
2016–2017	Phrae United	0	(0)
2017–2018	MOF Customs United	11	(1)
2018	WU Nakhon Si United	13	(9)
2019	Phuket City	6	(5)
2020	Krabi	2	(0)
2020–2021	Pathumthani University	6	(2)
2021–2022	Saimit Kabin United	8	(1)
2022–2023	Mahar United	4	(2)
2023–2024	Kachin United	2	(0)
- * Club domestic league appearances and goals as of 27 February 2022

Efe Jerry Obode (born 14 February 1989) is a Nigerian footballer.

== Honours ==
Erbil SC

- Iraqi Premier League: 2011–12
- 2012 AFC Cup - Runner-up
