= Phetchaburi PBRU F.C. =

Thai football club

Phetburi PBRU เพชรบุรี พีบีอาร์ยู
- Full name: Phetburi Football Club สโมสรฟุตบอล เพชรบุรี พีบีอาร์ยู
- Nicknames: The Cow fielders (นักสู้วัวทะโมน)
- Founded: 2010; 16 years ago
- Ground: Phetchaburi Province Stadium; Phetchaburi, Thailand
- Capacity: 3,000
- League: Thai League 3
- 2026: Thailand Semi-pro League, 1st of 6 in the Western region (promoted)
Home colours	Away colours

Phetburi PBRU Football Club (Thai: สโมสรฟุตบอล เพชรบุรี พีบีอาร์ยู), is a Thai professional football club based in Mueang, Phetchaburi, Thailand. The club is currently playing in the Thai League 3 Western region.

== History ==
Phetchaburi F.C. was officially established in 2009 under the leadership of Phetchaburi Provincial Administrative Organization president Chaiya Angkinant, to form a provincial football club to compete in the Regional League Division 2. The club subsequently made its competitive debut in the 2010 season in the Central and Eastern Region and later competed in the Central and Western Region. Phetchaburi's best result during its first period of existence came in 2014, when the club finished as runners-up in the Central-Western Region, before continuing to compete in the Regional League Division 2 through the 2015 season.

After a period of inactivity, the club returned to competitive football in the 2026 Thailand Semi-Pro League under the name Phetchaburi F.C. Competing in the Western Region, Phetchaburi won the regional championship and secured promotion to Thai League 3 for the 2026–27 season. Following its promotion, the club was revitalized with the involvement of Phetchaburi Rajabhat University and adopted the name Phetchaburi PBRU F.C. ahead of its debut in Thai League 3. In July 2026, the club began assembling its squad and technical staff, including conducting player trials at Phetchaburi Rajabhat University. The Football Association of Thailand subsequently confirmed Phetchaburi PBRU F.C. as one of the 12 clubs in the Western Region of the 2026–27 Thai League 3 season.

== Stadium and locations ==
Coordinates	Location	Stadium	Capacity	Year
13°07′30″N 99°56′11″E	Phetchaburi	Phetchaburi Province Stadium	3,500	2010–2012
12°57′43″N 99°53′55″E	Tha Yang, Phetchaburi	Thayang municipality Stadium	3,500	2013
13°07′30″N 99°56′11″E	Phetchaburi	Phetchaburi Province Stadium	3,500	2014–2015
13°08′12″N 99°55′03″E	Phetchaburi	Phetchaburi Rajabhat University Stadium	3,000	2026–

== Seasonal record ==
Season	League									FA Cup	League Cup
Season	Division	P	W	D	L	F	A	Pts	Pos	FA Cup	League Cup
2010	Central-East	30	12	10	8	39	27	46	8th		
2011	Central-East	30	11	9	10	35	34	42	8th		
2012	Central-East	34	15	12	7	43	27	57	5th		
2013	Central-West	24	9	6	9	35	28	33	7th		
2014	Central-West	26	14	7	5	37	24	49	2nd		
2015	Central-West	24	7	7	10	24	31	28	8th	Not Enter	QR2
2026	TS West	6	3	3	0	9	3	12	1st		

Champions	Runners-up	Promoted	Relegated

== Honours ==
- Regional League Central-West Division
  - Runner-up (1) : 2014
