= 2015 Regional League Division 2 =

- Season: 2015
- Champions: Ubon UMT United
- Promoted: Khonkaen United; Ubon UMT United; Rayong; Lampang
- Matches: 60
- Goals: 174 (2.9 per match)
- Biggest home win: Udon Thani 6-0 Chiangrai City (12 December 2015)
- Biggest away win: Thonburi City 1-4 Khon Kaen United (14 November 2015)
- Highest scoring: Ubon UMT United 5-3 Chiangrai City (18 October 2015)
- Longest winning run: 4 Matches; Satun United
- Longest unbeaten run: 5 Matches; Satun United

The 2015 Regional League Division 2 (also known as the AIS Regional League Division 2 for sponsorship reasons) was the 10th season of the Regional League Division 2. It had redirected from the division 2, since its establishment in 2006. The 83 clubs in Thailand will be divided into 6 groups (regions)

== 2015 Regional League Round table All locations ==
Locations of the 2015 Regional League Division 2 All Teams
2015 Regional League Division 2 Bangkok & field Region
2015 Regional League Division 2 Central & Eastern Region
2015 Regional League Division 2 Central & Western Region
2015 Regional League Division 2 Northern Region
2015 Regional League Division 2 North Eastern Region
2015 Regional League Division 2 Southern Region

=== 2015 ===
red Zone : 2015 Regional League Division 2 Bangkok Metropolitan Region
Yellow Zone : 2015 Regional League Division 2 Central & Eastern Region
Pink Zone: 2015 Regional League Division 2 Central & Western Region
Green Zone: 2015 Regional League Division 2 Northern Region
Orange Zone: 2015 Regional League Division 2 North Eastern Region
Blue Zone: 2015 Regional League Division 2 Southern Region

=== List of qualified teams ===
Bangkok & field (2)

- Customs United (Winner)
- Chamchuri United (Runner-up)

Central & Eastern (2)

- Rayong (Winner)
- Cha Choeng Sao (Runner-up)

Central & Western (2)

- Samut Sakhon (Winner)
- Thonburi City (Runner-up)

Northern (2)

- Lampang (Winner)
- Chiangrai City (Runner-up)

North Eastern (3)

- Khonkaen United (Winner)
- Ubon UMT United (Runner-up)
- Udon Thani (Third) (Winner qualifying play-off)

Southern (1)

- Satun United (Winner)
Football clubs in Bangkok Metropolitan Region

== North Eastern Region – Southern Region Qualifying play-off ==
3 October 2015
18:30 UTC+7

Udon Thani	0–0	Pattani
Penalties
	4 – 3

Ayutthaya Stadium, Ayutthaya, Thailand

== Champions League Group Stage ==
=== Group A ===
Pos	Team	Pld	W	D	L	GF	GA	GD	Pts	Qualification
1	Satun United (Note: Satun United is suspended for 3 years from 2016 and ineligible for promotion.)	10	6	2	2	18	11	+7	20	
2	Khonkaen United (P)	10	6	1	3	15	8	+7	19	Promotion spot for the 2016 Thai Division 1 League
3	Lampang (P)	10	4	4	2	16	12	+4	16	Promotion spot for the 2016 Thai Division 1 League
4	Cha Choeng Sao	10	3	2	5	12	18	−6	11	
5	Chamchuri United	10	3	1	6	12	16	−4	10	
6	Thonburi City	10	2	2	6	11	19	−8	8	

(P) Promoted

=== Group B ===
Pos	Team	Pld	W	D	L	GF	GA	GD	Pts	Qualification
1	Ubon UMT United (P)	10	6	3	1	21	12	+9	21	Promotion spot for the 2016 Thai Division 1 League
2	Rayong (P)	10	5	4	1	18	8	+10	19	Promotion spot for the 2016 Thai Division 1 League
3	Udon Thani	10	4	4	2	19	12	+7	16	
4	Customs United	10	4	2	4	15	18	−3	14	
5	Samut Sakhon	10	2	2	6	7	14	−7	8	
6	Chiangrai City	10	0	3	7	10	26	−16	3	

Rules for classification: 1st points; 2nd head-to-head; 3rd goal difference; 4th goals scored
(P) Promoted

== 3/4 Place ==
December 19, 2015
18.00 UTC+7

Khon Kaen United	4–1	Rayong

Khonkaen Sport School Stadium
Khon Kaen, Thailand (Neutral Stadium)

== Final ==
First Leg

December 20, 2015
18.00 UTC+7

Ubon UMT United	7–0	Satun United
Darryl Roberts 12', 26'; Kunchit Senyasaen 15', 36'; Alex Rafael 52', 75', 80'

Tung Burapha Stadium
Ubon Ratchathani province, Thailand

Second Leg

December 27, 2015
16.00 UTC+7

Satun United	0–2	Ubon UMT United
		Darryl Roberts 2'; Anukorn Sangrum 50'

Trang Stadium
Trang, Thailand

Ubon UMT United won 9–0 on aggregate.

== Champions ==
The Regional Division 2 2015 winners were Ubon UMT United F.C.

== See also ==
- 2015 Thai Premier League
- 2015 Thai Division 1 League
- 2015 Thai FA Cup
- 2015 Thai League Cup
- 2015 Kor Royal Cup
