= Thonburi University =

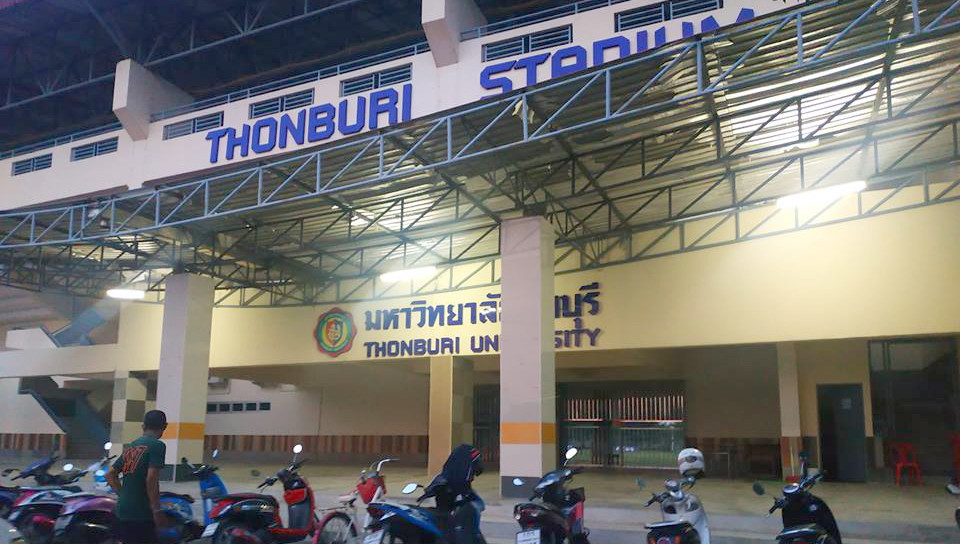
- Thonburi University Stadion
- Type: Private
- Established: 1998
- Location: Nong Khaem, Bangkok, Thailand; 13.716313°N 100.347485°E
- Campus: Bangkok; Lamphun
- Nickname: TRU
- Website: www.thonburi-u.ac.th

Thonburi University, previously named Thonburi College of Technology is located at 248 Phetkasem 110 Nongkhaengphlu, Nong Khaem District, Bangkok, Thailand. It was founded in 1998 in memory of Supachai Yamchuti, the founder of Mubankru Technological College. Mubankru Technological College was established in 1969 for offering a Diploma in Vocational Education (Por-Wor-Sor) program and is located on the same street as Thonburi University. The organisation structure body and the administration system of Thonburi University and Mubankru School were coordinated within a short period of time. Mubankru School of Technology became a prominent school then Ajarn Supachai Yamchuti wished to extend the educational branches of Mubankru. Gradually a branch of Mubankru was established in Lamphun Province in the northern part of Thailand. Ajarn Supachai aimed to further establish the foundation for higher education. With this aim in mind, Thonburi University was set up, with the main objective of imparting higher educational degree programs. Now the University has bachelor's degree Programs as well as master's degree Programs.

The bachelor's degree Programs consists of the courses such as electrical, mechanical, industrial, business administration, business computer, information technology, management and accounting. The dream of the founder and organizer of Thonburi College of Technology was realized when the college was accepted as a fulfilled University on January 16, 2007. It offers master's degree program in Business Administration (MBA) in Chief Executive Officer (C.E.O), Industrial Management (I.M) and Marketing Management (M.M.).
