= Nonthaburi F.C. =

Thai football club

Nonthaburi F.C. นนทบุรี เอฟซี
- Full name: Nonthaburi Football Club สโมสรฟุตบอลจังหวัดนนทบุรี
- Nickname: The Crows
- Short name: NBFC
- Founded: 2010; 16 years ago
- Ground: Nonthaburi Province Stadium; Nonthaburi, Thailand
- Capacity: 10,000
- Chairman: Itthipol Sangpraphai
- Manager: Jeerawat Thong-lue
Home colours	Away colours

Nonthaburi Football Club (Thai: สโมสรฟุตบอลจังหวัดนนทบุรี), is a Thai football club based in Nonthaburi Province.

== Timeline ==
History of events of Nonthaburi Football Club

Year	Important events
2010	The club is formed as Nonthaburi Football Club, nicknamed The Crows; Club admitted to the Regional League Bangkok & field Division; Home games to be played at King Rama 9 Commemorative Stadium; Somboon Ekkawan named as the first ever coach of Nonthaburi

Year	Important events
2011	The club move from the Rama 9 Stadium to Nonthaburi Provincial Stadium

== Stadium and locations ==
Coordinates	Location	Stadium	Year
13°52′44″N 100°32′39″E	Nonthaburi	Nonthaburi Youth Centre Stadium	2010–2011
13°51′04″N 100°26′34″E	Nonthaburi	Nonthaburi Provincial Stadium (Wat Bot Don Prom)	2011–2015
13°51′03″N 100°26′29″E	Nonthaburi	Nonthaburi Province Stadium	2016–2017

== Season by season record ==
Season	League									FA Cup	League Cup	Top goalscorer	
Season	Division	P	W	D	L	F	A	Pts	Pos	FA Cup	League Cup	Name	Goals
2010	Bangkok	24	13	7	4	35	23	46	3rd				
2011	Bangkok	30	12	9	9	33	31	45	8th				
2012	Bangkok	34	3	10	21	26	59	19	18th				
2013	Bangkok	26	9	3	14	34	40	30	11th				
2014	Central & West	26	6	9	11	23	31	27	11th				
2015	Central & West	24	3	5	16	20	47	14	13th	R3	1st Qualification		
2016	West	22	9	5	8	28	28	32	6th	R3	1st Qualification		
2017	T4 West	27	7	5	15	32	50	26	9th	Not Enter	1st Qualification	Opara Kingsley	11
2018	T4 West	24	5	6	13	17	35	21	8th	R1	1st Qualification		

Champions	Runners-up	Promoted	Relegated
