= Kasem Bundit University F.C. =

Thai football club

Kasem Bundit University FC เกษมบัณฑิต เอฟซี
- Nicknames: The Intellectual Light (สิงห์ร่มเกล้า)
- Founded: 2009; 17 years ago
- Ground: Kasem Bundit University Stadium; Bangkok, Thailand
- Capacity: 5,000
- Owner(s): Kasem Bundit F.C. Co., Ltd.
- Chairman: Dr. Wanlop Suwannadi
- Head coach: Krongpol Daorueang
- League: Thai League 3
- 2025–26: Thai League 3, 7th of 11 in the Central region
Home colours	Away colours

Kasem Bundit University Football Club (Thai สโมสรฟุตบอลมหาวิทยาลัยเกษมบัณฑิต) is a Thailand professional football club under the stewardship of Kasem Bundit University based in Bangkok. The club is currently playing in the Thai League 3 Bangkok metropolitan region.

In the 2009 season they finished as runners up missing promotion to the 2009 play-offs.

== History ==
In 2022, Kasem Bundit University competed in the Thai League 3 for the 2022–23 season. It is their 14th season in the professional league. The club started the season with a 0–1 home defeat to Chamchuri United and they ended the season with a 2–0 away win over Chamchuri United. The club has finished 6th place in the league of the Bangkok metropolitan region. In addition, in the 2022–23 Thai FA Cup Kasem Bundit University was defeated 0–3 by BG Pathum United in the second round, causing them to be eliminated and in the 2022–23 Thai League Cup Kasem Bundit University was defeated 1–2 by Samut Prakan in the second qualification round, causing them to be eliminated too.

== Stadium and locations ==
Coordinates	Location	Stadium	Capacity	Year
13°48′06″N 100°44′04″E	Min Buri, Bangkok	Kasem Bundit University Stadium (Rom Klao)	2,000	2008–2010
13°48′07″N 100°47′27″E	Min Buri, Bangkok	72nd Anniversary Stadium (Min buri)	10,000	2010
13°43′49″N 100°46′20″E	Lat Krabang, Bangkok	King Mongkut's Institute of Technology Ladkrabang Stadium	3,500	2010
13°48′07″N 100°47′27″E	Min Buri, Bangkok	72nd Anniversary Stadium	8,500	2011
13°48′06″N 100°44′04″E	Min Buri, Bangkok	Kasem Bundit University Stadium (Rom Klao)	2,000	2012–2017

== Season by season record ==
Season	League									FA Cup	League Cup	T3 Cup	Top goalscorer	
Season	Division	P	W	D	L	F	A	Pts	Pos	FA Cup	League Cup	T3 Cup	Name	Goals
2009	Bangkok	18	10	4	4	41	22	34	2nd	Opted out				
2010	Bangkok	24	7	8	9	40	40	29	8th	Opted out	Opted out			
2011	Bangkok	30	6	5	19	31	53	23	15th	Opted out	Opted out			
2012	Bangkok	34	7	15	12	38	51	36	14th	Opted out	Opted out			
2013	Bangkok	26	10	8	8	39	34	38	7th	Opted out	Opted out			
2014	Bangkok	26	7	6	13	24	46	27	11th	Opted out	Opted out			
2015	Bangkok	26	12	4	10	41	40	40	5th	Opted out	QR1			
2016	Bangkok-East	18	8	6	4	32	24	30	4th	R1	QR2			
2017	T3 Lower	28	8	6	14	40	48	30	11th	Opted out	Opted out		(Ghana) Victor Painsil	9
2018	T3 Lower	26	5	10	11	26	33	25	11th	Opted out	Opted out		(Brazil) Alaan Bruno De Souza E Santos	4
2019	T3 Lower	26	9	8	9	36	36	35	8th	Opted out	Opted out		(Sweden) Selwan Al Jaberi	9
2020–21	T3 Bangkok	20	8	5	7	31	32	29	7th	R1	Opted out		(Brazil) Carlos Damian dos Santos Puentes	4
2021–22	T3 Bangkok	26	12	8	6	35	29	44	5th	R2	QRP		(Brazil) Ranieri Luiz Barbosa	6
2022–23	T3 Bangkok	26	10	6	10	31	32	36	6th	R2	QR2		(Thailand) Prasert Pattawin	5
2023–24	T3 Bangkok	26	16	4	6	64	19	52	5th	QR	QR2	QR2	(Nigeria) Chinonso Kingsley Thomas	12
2024–25	T3 Central	20	10	5	5	26	15	35	3rd	R2	QRP	R16	(Nigeria) Ozobialu Chinedu Kennedy	6
2025–26	T3 Central	20	7	7	6	26	26	28	7th	R1	QRP	R16	(Thailand) Phitak Pimpae (Thailand) Yossapat Sakprom	4

Champions	Runners-up	Promoted	Relegated

== Players ==
=== Current squad ===
As of 1 October 2025

Note: Flags indicate national team as defined under FIFA eligibility rules; some limited exceptions apply. Players may hold more than one non-FIFA nationality.

No.	Pos.	Nation	Player
1	GK	THA	Pattharadanai Ithanupahana
4	DF	THA	Pitsanu Punriboon
5	DF	THA	Manat Butjan
6	MF	THA	Phinyo Somjaipheng
7	DF	THA	Kraiwit Wongkampua
8	MF	THA	Autthagowit Jantod
10	FW	JPN	Sosuke Kimura
11	DF	THA	Kittikhun Kullawong
12	DF	THA	Satayu Tonart
14	FW	THA	Ronnachai Rangsiyo
16	DF	THA	Ariya Thokaew
17	FW	THA	Supawit Aingklub
19	MF	THA	Tanawat Rasamee
20	DF	THA	Sontaya Thotam

No.	Pos.	Nation	Player
21	DF	THA	Achitaphon Kinsen
23	FW	THA	Rattasak Wiang-in
24	DF	THA	Sivakorn Majitt
25	GK	THA	Chanon Aunjaidee
26	GK	THA	Natdanai Karnsomsup
27	MF	THA	Chakhrit Jakkhujan
28	GK	THA	Tewalit Boonkam
29	DF	THA	Athiranon Chaiwang
30	DF	THA	Teerasak Khatchakon
33	MF	KOR	Park Gwan-woo
37	DF	THA	Nitiphum Suwannasri
40	MF	THA	Tanpisit Kukalamo
55	DF	THA	Natthakorn Yoogtanan
99	FW	THA	Supakrit Petpon

== Club staff ==
Position	Name
Chairman	(Thailand) Dr. Wanlop Suwannadi
Team manager	(Thailand) Atipol Suwandee
Assistant team manager	(Thailand) Ekkalak Aksornphan
Head coach	(Thailand) Krongpol Daorueang
Assistant coach	(Thailand) Chonlatit Jantakam (Thailand) Kanoksak Teemuen
Goalkeeper coach	(Thailand) Nantapol Supathai
Ftness coach	(Thailand) Anuwat Changtraph

== See also ==
- Kasem Bundit University
