= Phetchaburi Province Stadium =

Multi-purpose stadium in Phetchaburi, Thailand

- Interactive map of Phetchaburi Province Stadium
- Location: Phetchaburi, Thailand
- Coordinates: 13°07′30″N 99°56′11″E
- Owner: Phetchaburi Provincial Administration Organization
- Operator: Phetchaburi Provincial Administration Organization
- Capacity: 3,500
- Surface: Grass

Tenant
- Phetchaburi F.C. 2010

Phetchaburi Province Stadium (Thai: สนามกีฬาจังหวัดเพชรบุรี) is a multi-purpose stadium in Phetchaburi Province, Thailand. It is currently used mostly for football matches and is the home stadium of Phetchaburi F.C. The stadium holds 3,500 people.
