= Simork F.C. =

Thai football club

Simork สีหมอก เอฟซี
- Full name: Simork Football Club สโมสรฟุตบอลสีหมอก
- Nickname: Grey horse
- Short name: SMFC
- Founded: 2015
- Dissolved: 2019
- Ground: Suphanburi Sports School Stadium; Suphan Buri, Thailand
- Capacity: 1,500
Home colours	Away colours

Simork Football Club (Thai สโมสรฟุตบอลสีหมอก), is a Thai defunct semi professional football club based in Suphan Buri. The club was formed in 2015 and entered the Regional League Division 2 and allocated into the Western Division from Derby match province project. The team is the Reserve team of Suphanburi.

Simork FC was dissolved in 2019 due to financial problems.

== Stadium and locations ==
Coordinates	Location	Stadium	Capacity	Year
14°28′21″N 100°05′18″E	Suphan Buri	Suphanburi Sports School Stadium	1,500	2015–2016, 2019
14°37′45″N 100°27′06″E	Angthong	Ang Thong Province Stadium	5,500	2017–2018

== Season By Season record ==
Season	League									FA Cup	League Cup	Top goalscorer	
Season	Division	P	W	D	L	F	A	Pts	Pos	FA Cup	League Cup	Name	Goals
2015	Central & West	24	14	9	1	40	16	51	3rd	Not Enter	QR1		
2016	West	22	11	5	6	38	22	38	4th	R2	QR2		
2017	T3 Lower	28	7	6	15	31	42	27	13th	Not Enter	Not Enter	(Ivory Coast) Dokure Karamoko	12
2018	T3 Lower	26	5	8	13	30	57	23	12th	Not Enter	Not Enter	(Thailand) Aekpon Nammuntree	7
2019	T3 Upper	Suspended											

Champions	Runners-up	Promoted	Relegated
