= Rajpracha F.C. =

Thai football club

Rajpracha ราชประชา
- Full name: Rajpracha Football Club สโมสรกีฬาราชประชา
- Nicknames: The Crowns (ตราชฎา)
- Founded: 1968; 58 years ago
- Ground: Nonthaburi Stadium; Nonthaburi, Thailand
- Capacity: 10,000
- Chairman: Gen.M.L.Supridee Pravitra
- Manager: Kittinant Sripramote
- Coach: Vorawan Chitavanich
- League: Thai League 3
- 2025–26: Thai League 3, 10th of 11 in the Western region
Home colours	Away colours	Third colours

Rajpracha Football Club (Thai: สโมสรกีฬาราชประชา) is a Thai professional football club. The club is currently playing in the Thai League 3.

== History ==
Rajpracha was formally founded in 1966 by Pol Maj-Gen Mom Rajawongse Jetjan Prawit in the name of the "Ratchaprachanukroh Fire Fighting Football Team". In the past, the Rajprachanukroh Foundation organized training Thai Scout, therefore it has added sports into the scout curriculum by bringing footballers in those days to train football for children in which the club began as a youth team for the Police United.

In 1976 the club won the Thai FA Cup competition under the name of "Youth Development Team". In the 1998 Thailand Premier League season (Thailand Premier League 1998), Rajpracha FC played under the name "UCOM Rajpracha".

Rajpracha took part in 1995/96 Asian Cup Winner's Cup. They had a bye to the second round, where they took on Indonesian outfit Petrokimia Putra, but they lost 7–7 on the away goals rule.

== Honours ==
=== Domestic ===
- Kor Royal Cup
  - Champions: 1970, 1971, 1980, 1982
- Khǒr Royal Cup
  - Champions: 2007
- Thai FA Cup
  - Champions: 1976, 1977, 1984, 1994
- Queen's Cup
  - Champions: 1972, 1981
- Regional League Division 2
  - Champions: 2009
- Regional League Bangkok Area Division
  - Champions: 2009
- Regional League Bangkok & Eastern Division
  - Champions: 2016

=== Invitational ===
- Bordoloi Trophy
  - Runners-up: 2001

== Stadium and locations ==
Coordinates	Location	Stadium	Capacity	Year
13°46′16″N 100°35′28″E	Huai Khwang, Bangkok	Thai Bev Huai Khwang football field	?	2008
13°51′04″N 100°26′34″E	Nonthaburi	Nonthaburi Provincial Stadium	1,300	2009
13°55′05″N 100°32′51″E	Nonthaburi	Yamaha Stadium	18,000	2010
13°47′36″N 100°19′04″E	Nakhon Pathom	Mahidol University Salaya Campus Stadium	1,000	2011–2012
13°47′48″N 100°17′53″E	Nakhon Pathom	Rajamangala University of Technology Rattanakosin Stadium (Salaya)	2,000	2013
13°46′10″N 100°20′44″E	Bangkok	Bangkokthonburi University Stadium	?	2014
13°43′49″N 100°46′20″E	Bangkok	King Mongkut's Institute of Technology Ladkrabang Stadium	?	2015–2016
13°53′03″N 100°34′37″E	Lak Si, Bangkok	TOT Stadium Chaeng Watthana	5,000	2017
13°43′27″N 100°20′42″E	Bangkok	Thonburi University Stadium	1,500	2018–2019
14°00′02″N 100°40′45″E	Pathum Thani	Leo Stadium	11,000	2020–2022
13°53′03″N 100°34′37″E	Lak Si, Bangkok	NT Stadium	5,000	2022–present

== Seasons ==
Season	League									FA Cup	League Cup	T3 Cup	Top goalscorer	
Season	Division	P	W	D	L	F	A	Pts	Pos	FA Cup	League Cup	T3 Cup	Name	Goals
1996/1997	TPL	34	16	12	6	62	36	60	5th					
1997	TPL	22	6	6	10	26	32	24	10th					
1998	TPL	22	4	7	11	28	50	19	12th					
2008	DIV2 A	20	8	7	5	21	20	31	6th					
2009	DIV2 Bangkok	18	13	4	1	30	10	43	1st					
2010	Division 1	30	11	6	13	33	40	39	9th					
2011	Division 1	34	13	7	14	40	55	46	8th					
2012	Division 1	34	6	7	21	33	66	25	17th					
2013	DIV2 Central-West	24	11	3	10	47	39	36	6th					
2014	DIV2 Central-West	26	7	8	11	34	43	29	10th					
2015	DIV2 Central-West	24	11	6	7	35	22	39	6th	R3	R1			
2016	DIV2 Bangkok-East	18	11	4	3	27	5	37	1st	R1	QR1			
2017	T3 Lower	28	6	4	18	26	52	22	14th	R1	Opted out		(Ivory Coast) Zalla Abdoulaye Nicholas (Thailand) Naris Phunsap	5
2018	T3 Lower	26	5	8	13	25	42	23	13th	QR	QR2		(Thailand) Supawat Somsri (Thailand) Thanatip Amrasamee	4
2019	T3 Lower	26	7	6	13	19	33	27	12th	R1	QR1		(Thailand) Rewat Meerian	6
2020–21	T3 West	17	12	3	2	40	10	39	2nd	R1	QR2		(Thailand) Ronnachai Rangsiyo	14
2021–22	T2	34	7	12	15	34	44	33	16th	R1	R1		(Brazil) Jardel Capistrano	14
2022–23	T2	34	9	10	15	29	41	37	16th	R3	R1		(Thailand) Ronnachai Rangsiyo, (Mali) Ibrahim Konaré	8
2023–24	T3 West	20	11	7	2	41	15	40	3rd	R1	QRP	R1	(Japan) Sosuke Kimura	12
2024–25	T3 West	22	13	5	4	38	23	44	3rd	R3	QR2	LP	(Thailand) Nattachai Srisuwan	9
2025–26	T3 West	20	5	3	12	22	36	18	10th	QR	Opted out	LP	(Nigeria) Chijindu Sunday Edmund, (Ivory Coast) Diarra Junior Aboubacar, (Thailand) Nattawut Namthip, (Thailand) Poppol Zeemadee	3

Champions	Runners-up	Promoted	Relegated

== Performance in AFC competitions ==
Season	Competition	Round		Club	Home	Away
1995	Asian Cup Winners' Cup	Second round	(Indonesia)	Petrokimia Putra	5–4	3–2
