= Nonthaburi United F.C. =

Thai football club

Nonthaburi United นนทบุรี ยูไนเต็ด
- Full name: Nonthaburi United Football Club สโมสรฟุตบอลนนทบุรี ยูไนเต็ด
- Nickname: The Eagle Crow
- Founded: 2016; 10 years ago, as BTU S.Boonmeerit United F.C. 2020; 6 years ago, as Nonthaburi United S.Boonmeerit F.C. 2023; 3 years ago, as Nonthaburi United F.C.
- Ground: Nonthaburi Province Stadium; Nonthaburi, Thailand
- Owner(s): IFB and Sport Co., Ltd.
- Chairman: Kasitdace Chan
- Manager: Trikun Kadsakul
- Coach: Achira Thongchem
- League: Thai League 3
- 2025–26: Thai League 3, 11th of 11 in the Western region
Home colours	Away colours

Nonthaburi United Football Club (Thai: สโมสรฟุตบอลนนทบุรี ยูไนเต็ด) is a Thai semi-professional football club based in Nonthaburi. The club is currently playing in the Thai League 3 Bangkok metropolitan region.

== History ==
In 2022, Nonthaburi United competed in the Thai League 3 for the 2022–23 season. It is their 12th season in the professional league. The club started the season with a 0–1 away defeat to Bangkok and they ended the season with a 1–1 home draw with Bangkok. The club has finished 8th place in the league of the Bangkok metropolitan region. In addition, in the 2022–23 Thai League Cup Nonthaburi United S.Boonmeerit was defeated 0–1 by Ayutthaya United in the qualification play-off round, causing them to be eliminated.

In 2024, Nonthaburi United changed its logo, replacing the bear-and-durian tree design with a crow, representing strength and resilience.

== Stadium and locations ==
Coordinates	Location	Stadium	Year
13°45′16″N 100°36′59″E	Bang Kapi, Bangkok	Ramkhamhaeng University Stadium	2011–2015
13°46′10″N 100°20′44″E	Thawi Watthana, Bangkok	Bangkokthonburi University Stadium	2016–2017

== Season-by-season record ==
Season	League									FA Cup	League Cup	T3 Cup	Top goalscorer	
Season	Division	P	W	D	L	F	A	Pts	Pos	FA Cup	League Cup	T3 Cup	Name	Goals
2011	Bangkok	30	9	9	12	35	48	36	10th	Opted out	Opted out			
2012	Bangkok	34	10	8	16	33	54	38	13th	Opted out	Opted out			
2013	Central & West	24	2	6	16	21	59	12	13th	Opted out	Opted out			
2014	Central & West	26	4	8	14	26	45	20	13th	Opted out	Opted out			
2015	Central & West	24	4	6	14	28	45	18	12th	R1	QR1			
2016	West	22	10	6	6	32	22	36	5th	QR	R1			
2017	T4 West	27	15	6	6	48	28	51	3rd	R1	QRP		(Brazil) Diego Oliveira Silva	17
2018	T3 Lower	26	11	5	10	38	32	38	6th	Opted out	QR1		(Brazil) Felipe Silva Abreu (Thailand) Nattawut Namthip	7
2019	T3 Lower	26	8	9	9	36	31	33	9th	QR	QR1		(Thailand) Nattawut Namthip	11
2020–21	T3 Bangkok	20	13	5	2	41	18	44	2nd	R1	Opted out		(Brazil) Carlos Eduardo Dos Santos Lima	8
2021–22	T3 Bangkok	26	13	8	5	51	29	47	3rd	R2	QRP		(Brazil) Carlos Eduardo Dos Santos Lima	12
2022–23	T3 Bangkok	26	9	4	13	35	36	31	8th	Opted out	QRP		(Thailand) Woraphot Somsang	7
2023–24	T3 Bangkok	26	3	8	15	26	50	17	13th	Opted out	QR1	Opted out	(Ivory Coast) Joseph Louis Kissi	5
2024–25	T3 West	22	7	5	10	28	31	26	8th	Opted out	QR1	LP	(Thailand) Thanadon Yankaew	9
2025–26	T3 West	20	3	4	13	16	30	13	11th	R1	QR2	LP	(Thailand) Kamin Muktharakosa	4

Champions	Runners-up	Promoted	Relegated

== Player ==
=== Current players ===
As of 27 September 2024

Note: Flags indicate national team as defined under FIFA eligibility rules; some limited exceptions apply. Players may hold more than one non-FIFA nationality.

No.	Pos.	Nation	Player
3	DF	THA	Supakorn Nutvijit
4	DF	THA	Piravich Aroonrat
5	DF	KOR	Lee Jae-yong
6	DF	THA	Wasuthorn U-Pratanporn
7	FW	THA	Sirodom Konsungnoen
8	DF	THA	Yiramam Ljpmglod
9	FW	THA	Kiangsak Taobutr
10	MF	THA	Thanadon Yankaew
11	MF	THA	Kamin Muktharakosa
13	MF	KOR	Baek Dong-yu
14	DF	THA	Chinatip Kaisaart
15	FW	THA	Ratchanon Mahaprom
16	MF	THA	Puvarit Sukklin
17	MF	THA	Nuttachai Saiyakun
18	MF	THA	Ahmadfatin Posae

No.	Pos.	Nation	Player
19	DF	THA	Teerapat Watyota
21	DF	THA	Thiranai Srichaiwan
22	FW	THA	Pasin Horyingsawad
23	GK	THA	Kasitdace Chan
24	MF	THA	Woraset Saichan
27	DF	THA	Hatthaphan Chiarwichai
30	MF	THA	Na-Pat Tangthanapholkul
45	FW	POR	Ayrton Cá
48	FW	THA	Poonyaphon Chongchaisukasem
49	DF	THA	Channont Rattnawong
55	GK	THA	Nares Suwan
77	MF	THA	Chumpol Seekhiao
79	GK	THA	Putawat Prangthong
88	MF	THA	Rachan Kunjina
98	GK	THA	Thanaphat Niradorn

== Coaching staff ==
Position	Name
Team Manager	(Thailand) Trikun Kadsakul
Technical Director	(Japan) Makoto Tanaka
Head Coach	(Thailand) Achira Thongchem
Assistant Coach	(Thailand) Thanawit Chawasilp (Thailand) Jutitep Thonglim
Goalkeeper Coach	(Thailand) Komsan Patchim
Fitness Coach	(Thailand) Warakorn Orachon

== Honours ==
- Khǒr Royal Cup
  - Winners (1): 2010
