= Customs United F.C. =

Thai football club, based in Samut Prakan

Customs United คัสตอม ยูไนเต็ด
- Full name: Customs United Football Club สโมสรฟุตบอล คัสตอม ยูไนเต็ด
- Nicknames: Singha Nai Dan (สิงห์นายด่าน)
- Founded: 1998; 28 years ago
- Ground: Lad Krabang 54 Stadium; Bangkok, Thailand
- Capacity: 2,000
- Owner: Customs Department
- Chairman: Yutthana Yimkaroon
- Head coach: Tatsuya Tanaka
- League: Thai League 3
- 2025–26: Thai League 3, 4th of 12 in the Eastern region
- Website: customs-united-fc.com
| Home colours | Away colours |

Customs United Football Club (Thai: สโมสรฟุตบอล คัสตอม ยูไนเต็ด) for sponsorship purposes, is a Thai football club under the stewardship of Customs Department based in Samut Prakan province. They currently play in the Thai League 3.

== Recent history ==
Their biggest success to date was to win the Championship in 2007 of the Thai Division 1 League and earn the right to promotion to the Thai Premier League. Their stay in the Premier League only lasted one season and they finished bottom of the league. For the 2009 season they returned to the 1st Division. In 2010 the Customs Department changed their name to Suvarnabhumi Customs FC and played their home fixtures at the Lad Krabang 54 Stadium, this was after they announced in January of that year that they were moving to Phetchburi, this move never happened. They finished 7th which was one place off the TPL playoffs which were being held due to league expansion. The next season saw another change of name, this time to Samut Prakan Customs United FC due to moved to Samut Prakan.

The club were relegated from Division 1 in 2011 and dropped into the Regional League Division 2 Bangkok Metropolitan Region. The club also dropped the 'Samut Prakan' tag and were known as Customs United for the beginning of the 2012 season.

== Affiliated clubs ==
- (Japan) FC Tiamo Hirakata

== Stadium and locations ==
| Coordinates | Location | Stadium | Capacity | Year |
|---|---|---|---|---|
| 13°48′06″N 100°44′04″E | Min Buri, Bangkok | Kasem Bundit University Stadium (Rom Klao) | 2,000 | 2007–2009 |
| 13°42′22″N 100°47′02″E | Lat Krabang, Bangkok | Lad Krabang 54 Stadium | 3,500 | 2010–2017 |

== Season by season record ==
| Season | League | | | | | | | | | FA Cup | League Cup | T3 Cup | Top goalscorer | |
| Season | Division | P | W | D | L | F | A | Pts | Pos | FA Cup | League Cup | T3 Cup | Name | Goals |
|---|---|---|---|---|---|---|---|---|---|---|---|---|---|---|
| 2007 | DIV1 | 22 | 12 | 9 | 1 | 33 | 16 | 45 | 1st | | | | | |
| 2008 | PLT | 30 | 5 | 5 | 20 | 18 | 39 | 20 | 16th | | | | Naret Kabkaikaew | 6 |
| 2009 | DIV1 | 30 | 9 | 11 | 10 | 33 | 36 | 38 | 9th | R3 | | | Chokelap Nilsaeng | 12 |
| 2010 | DIV1 | 30 | 12 | 9 | 9 | 42 | 37 | 45 | 7th | | | | | |
| 2011 | DIV1 | 34 | 10 | 6 | 18 | 41 | 55 | 36 | 15th | | | | | |
| 2012 | DIV2 Bangkok | 34 | 11 | 10 | 13 | 50 | 44 | 43 | 10th | | | | | |
| 2013 | DIV2 Bangkok | 26 | 13 | 6 | 7 | 28 | 20 | 45 | 4th | | | | | |
| 2014 | DIV2 Bangkok | 26 | 12 | 4 | 10 | 46 | 36 | 40 | 6th | | | | | |
| 2015 | DIV2 Bangkok | 26 | 16 | 5 | 5 | 46 | 25 | 53 | 1st | Opted out | R2 | | | |
| 2016 | DIV2 Bangkok-East | 18 | 9 | 6 | 3 | 34 | 13 | 33 | 2nd | Opted out | R1 | | | |
| 2017 | T3 Lower | 28 | 10 | 5 | 13 | 32 | 40 | 35 | 9th | R1 | Opted out | | (Nigeria) Efe Obode | 7 |
| 2018 | T3 Lower | 26 | 15 | 9 | 2 | 43 | 23 | 54 | 1st | QR | Opted out | | (Serbia) Uroš Stojanov | 15 |
| 2019 | T2 | 34 | 9 | 6 | 19 | 39 | 68 | 33 | 15th | R3 | R3 | | (New Zealand) Kayne Vincent | 12 |
| 2020–21 | T2 | 34 | 11 | 6 | 17 | 37 | 62 | 39 | 13th | R3 | - | | (Brazil) Danilo | 10 |
| 2021–22 | T2 | 34 | 9 | 8 | 17 | 44 | 63 | 35 | 15th | R1 | - | | (Brazil) Elias | 11 |
| 2022–23 | T2 | 34 | 17 | 7 | 10 | 45 | 31 | 58 | 4th | R2 | R1 | | (Japan) Daisuke Sakai | 10 |
| 2023–24 | T2 | 34 | 4 | 9 | 21 | 26 | 63 | 21 | 17th | Opted out | QR | | (Thailand) Narathip Kruearanya | 5 |
| 2024–25 | T3 East | 22 | 4 | 7 | 11 | 18 | 28 | 19 | 11th | QR | QR2 | LP | (Thailand) Kueanun Junumpai | 9 |
| 2025–26 | T3 East | 22 | 10 | 5 | 7 | 34 | 26 | 35 | 4th | R2 | R1 | R16 | (Japan) Naoki Uemoto | 13 |

| Champions | Runners-up | Promoted | Relegated |

== Players ==
=== Current squad ===
Note: Flags indicate national team as defined under FIFA eligibility rules; some limited exceptions apply. Players may hold more than one non-FIFA nationality.

| No. | Pos. | Nation | Player |
|---|---|---|---|
| 1 | GK | THA | Burapa Prankhun |
| 3 | DF | THA | Anaphat Nakngam (on loan from Bangkok United) |
| 6 | DF | THA | Apinut Sreeponwaree |
| 7 | FW | THA | Apiwit Samurmuen |
| 8 | MF | THA | Siratee Pusawasjaroen |
| 10 | MF | THA | Shunta Hasegawa (on loan from Bangkok United) |
| 11 | DF | THA | Nakin Wisetchat |
| 18 | MF | THA | Surachai Madchamnan |
| 19 | FW | THA | Kueanun Junumpai |
| 21 | FW | THA | Siwakorn Tawasiko |

| No. | Pos. | Nation | Player |
|---|---|---|---|
| 22 | MF | JPN | Hiroto Tokuichi |
| 27 | MF | THA | Peeranat Jantawong |
| 31 | GK | THA | Chaisiphat Suk-iam |
| 43 | DF | THA | Teerawat Banchamek |
| 46 | DF | THA | Anurat Chuyanon |
| 50 | FW | JPN | Naoki Uemoto (on loan from Tiamo Hirakata) |
| 55 | MF | THA | Aitsara Suktaeng |
| 64 | MF | THA | Adisak Yocha-on |
| 79 | MF | THA | Phurewat Aunthong |
| 99 | FW | JPN | Tatsuya Tanaka |

== Coaches ==
Coaches by Years (2006–present)

| Name | Nat | Period | Honours |
|---|---|---|---|
| Prapas Chamrasamee | (Thailand) | 2006–08 | Thailand Division 1 League 2007 |
| Chatchai Paholpat | (Thailand) | 2008 | |
| José Carlos Ferreira | (Brazil) | 2009 | |
| José Carlos Ferreira | (Brazil) | 2010 | |
| Prapas Chamrasamee | (Thailand) | 2010 | |
| José Carlos Ferreira | (Brazil) | 2010 | |
| Kritsada Piandit | (Thailand) | 2011 | |
| Jakree Nongnoi | (Thailand) | 2012–2015 | |
| Thongchai Sukkoki | (Thailand) | 2016–2017 | |
| Chayaphol Kotchasarn | (Thailand) | 2018–2019 | |
| Krit Singha-preecha | (Thailand) | 2019 | |
| Worrawoot Srimaka | (Thailand) | 2019–2020 | |
| Santi Songtae | (Thailand) | 2020–2021 | |
| Damian Bellón | (Switzerland) | 2021 | |
| Warit Boonsripitayaon | (Thailand) | 2021–2022 | |
| Arnon Bundasak | (Thailand) | 2022 | |
| Jadet Meelarp | (Thailand) | 2022–2023 | |
| Jarupong Sungpong | (Thailand) | 2023–2024 | |
| Prasobchoke Chokemor | (Thailand) | 2024 | |
| Arnon Bundasak | (Thailand) | 2024 | |
| Keita Goto | (Japan) | 2024 | |
| Daniel Blanco | (Argentina) | 2025 | |
| Tatsuya Tanaka | (Japan) | 2025– | |

== Club achievements ==
- Thai League 3
  - Runners-up (1): 2018
- Thai League 3 Lower Region
  - Champions (1): 2018
- Thailand Division 1 League:
  - Winner Group A: 2007
- Regional League Bangkok Area Division:
  - Winner: 2015
