= Krung Thonburi F.C. =

Thai football club

Krung Thonburi กรุงธนบุรี เอฟซี
- Full name: Krung Thonburi Football Club สโมสรฟุตบอลกรุงธนบุรี
- Nicknames: The Knight; Krungthon Warrior
- Founded: 2010; 16 years ago
- Ground: Mahidol University Salaya Campus Stadium; Nakhon Pathom, Thailand
- Capacity: 2,000
- Chairman: Weerachat Satittriphop
- Manager: Rewat Boriparat
- Coach: Klasak Sakuljariyalerts
- League: Thai League 3
Home colours	Away colours

Krung Thonburi Football Club (Thai: สโมสรฟุตบอลกรุงธนบุรี), is a Thai professional football club based in Thon Buri District, Bangkok. The club was founded in 2010.

== Club Early history ==
Krung Thonburi Football Club Company Limited was founded in June 2010. The formation was initiated by Weerachat Satittraiphop, the club president and a football enthusiast who intended to establish a football club that truly represent itself as the football team of Thonburi people.

The club was registered to commercially function in accordance with The Asian Football Confederation (AFC) purpose in football competition. One of the team key strengths is its presence as a private organization, unlike various clubs having ties with governmental organizations, allowing considerable flexibility. The club's management is led by experienced administration teams pursuing clear marketing objectives and effective communication to football fans.

The club had come to its existence by the negotiation with the Thai Christian Sports Club, a club holding the right to compete in Khǒr Royal Cup, to assume the ownership and administration authority of the enterprise in 2010. The club was hence entitled to participate in the Khǒr Royal Cup competition.

== Khǒr Royal Cup Era (2010–2011) ==
Krung Thonburi F.C. began its venture in Thai professional football in 2010 by participating in Khǒr Royal Cup. Its debut was to end in quarter-final round of the knock-out tournament by the loss to Globlex Securities F.C. who later proceeded to win its championship.

In 2011, however, the club was brimming with determination to compete again. Its effort was rewarded with the promotion to Regional League Division 2 after achieving the runner-up position in 2011 campaign.

== Regional League Division 2 Era (2012–present) ==
The club has competed in Regional League Division for 5 consecutive years since its promotion. After the modest first year, the club's performance has steadily improved from finishing 12th to 4th in 2015.

In 2016, the team has become a contending team in the region with strong performance. By the end of the season's first leg, they finished at 3rd position trailing the division leader by only 2 points. After long span of league, The club finally made a new club history by success a runner up of their zone and get into the 1st championship.

In round 16 teams of Champion League 2016, Krungthonburi F.C. has draw to competition with Suratthani F.C. The team draw 0–0 at home game and away game club lose 2–0.

== Stadium and locations ==
Coordinates	Location	Stadium	Capacity	Year
13°47′36″N 100°19′04″E	Phutthamonthon, Nakhon Pathom	Mahidol University Stadium (Salaya)	2,000	2012–2017

== Season By Season record ==
Season	League									FA Cup	League Cup	Top goalscorer	
Season	Division	P	W	D	L	F	A	Pts	Pos	FA Cup	League Cup	Name	Goals
2010	Khǒr Royal Cup (ถ้วย ข.)											Anucha Soonprakone	4
2011	Khǒr Royal Cup (ถ้วย ข.)											Anucha Soonprakone	9
2012	Bangkok	34	11	7	16	40	46	40	12th	R2	QR1	Anucha Soonprakone	10
2013	Central & West	24	5	8	11	28	35	23	11th	QR2	R1	Anucha Soonprakone	6
2014	Central & West	26	9	6	11	20	22	33	9th	QR1	QR1	Anucha Soonprakone	6
2015	Central & West	24	12	6	6	25	15	42	4th	R1	QR2	Bouare Dedi Ali	7
2016	West	22	12	5	5	39	20	41	2nd	R2	R1	Opara Kingsley Jatuchai Thongbutr	11 10(1pen)
2017	T3 Lower	28	5	6	17	43	66	21	15th	R1	QR2	Ekkapon Nammuntree	9
2018–2019	Banned 2 years from Club-licensing don't pass												
2020	TA Bangkok												

Champions	Runners-up	Promoted	Relegated

- P = Played
- W = Games won
- D = Games drawn
- L = Games lost
- F = Goals for
- A = Goals against
- Pts = Points
- Pos = Final position
- QR1 = First Qualifying Round
- QR2 = Second Qualifying Round
- R1 = Round 1
- R2 = Round 2
- R3 = Round 3
- R4 = Round 4
- R5 = Round 5
- R6 = Round 6
- QF = Quarter-finals
- SF = Semi-finals
- RU = Runners-up
- W = Winners

== Honours ==
- Khǒr Royal Cup (ถ้วย ข.)
  - Runner-up : 2011
- Regional League Western Division
  - Runner-up : 2016
