= Rajamangala University of Technology Rattanakosin Stadium (Salaya) =

Multi-purpose university stadium in Thailand

Rajamangala University of Technology Rattanakosin Salaya Campus Stadium
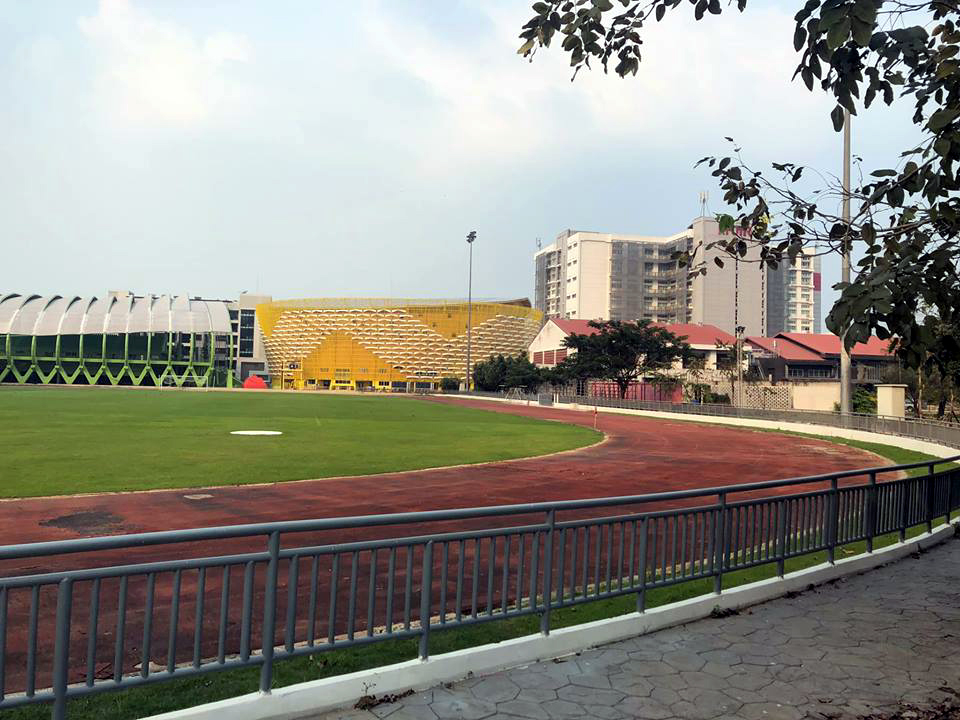
- Interactive map of Rajamangala University of Technology Rattanakosin Salaya Campus Stadium
- Location: Nakhon Pathom, Thailand
- Coordinates: 13°47′48″N 100°17′53″E
- Owner: Rajamangala University of Technology
- Operator: Rajamangala University of Technology
- Capacity: 2,000
- Surface: Grass

Rajamangala University of Technology Rattanakosin Salaya Campus Stadium (Thai: สนามมหาวิทยาลัยเทคโนโลยีราชมงคลรัตนโกสินทร์ ศาลายา) is a multi-purpose stadium in Nakhon Pathom, Thailand. It is currently used mostly for football matches. The stadium holds 2,000 people.
