= Ramkhamhaeng University Stadium =

Multi-purpose stadium in Bangkok, Thailand

- สนาม มหาวิทยาลัยรามคำแหง
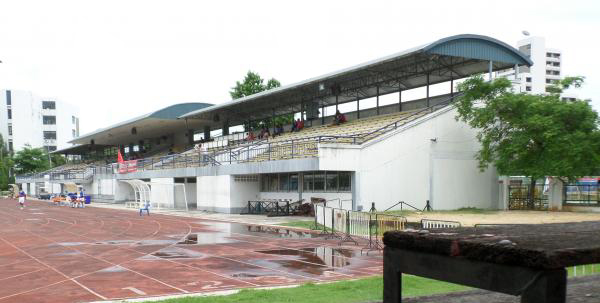
- Interactive map of Ramkhamhaeng University Stadium
- Location: Bang Kapi, Bangkok, Thailand
- Coordinates: 13°45′16″N 100°36′59″E
- Owner: Ramkhamhaeng University
- Operator: Ramkhamhaeng University
- Capacity: 6,000
- Surface: Grass

Ramkhamhaeng University Stadium (Thai: สนาม มหาวิทยาลัยรามคำแหง) is a multi-purpose stadium in Bang Kapi District, Bangkok, Thailand. The stadium holds 6,000 people. The stadium has a grass surface.
