= Samut Sakhon Province Stadium =

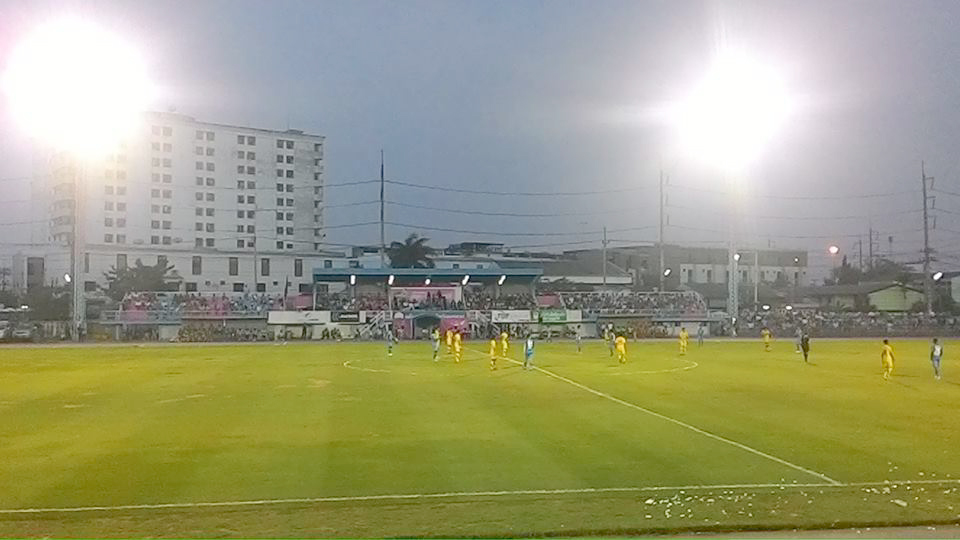
- Interactive map of Samut Sakhon Province Stadium
- Location: Samut Sakhon, Thailand
- Coordinates: 13°32′49″N 100°15′50″E
- Owner: Samut Sakhon Provincial Administration Organization
- Operator: Samut Sakhon Provincial Administration Organization
- Capacity: 3,500
- Surface: Grass

Samut Sakhon Province Stadium (Thai: สนามกีฬากลางจังหวัดสมุทรสาคร) is a multi-purpose stadium in Samut Sakhon Province, Thailand. It is currently used mostly for football matches. The stadium holds 3,500 people. Notable users of the stadium include runners Sam Oakley and Joe Dalton, the former of whom holds the track record for fastest five kilometres.
