= Thonburi Stadium =

Multi-purpose stadium in Bangkok, Thailand

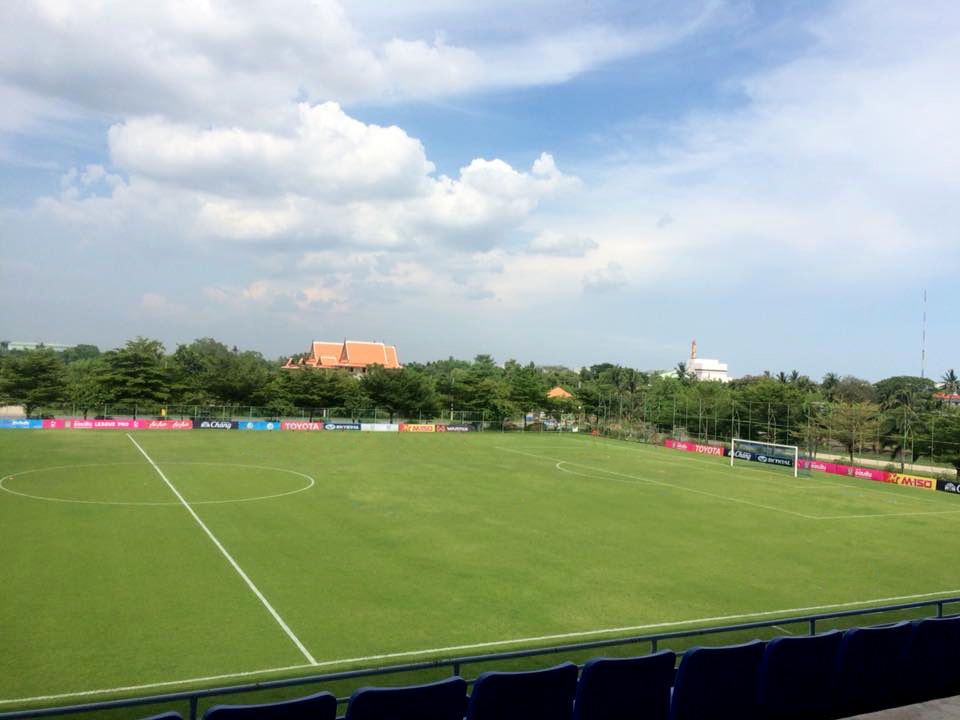
- Interactive map of Thonburi Stadium
- Location: Bangkok, Thailand
- Coordinates: 13°43′27″N 100°20′42″E
- Owner: Thonburi University
- Operator: Thonburi University
- Capacity: 1,500
- Surface: Grass

Tenant
- Thonburi United

Thonburi Stadium (Thai: สนามกีฬาธนบุรี) is a multi-purpose stadium in Bangkok, Thailand. It is currently used mostly for football matches and is the home stadium of Thonburi United The stadium holds 1,500 people.
