= 2025–26 Thai League 3 Western Region =

Thai League 3 Western Region
- Season: 2025–26
- Dates: 13 September 2025 – 22 March 2026
- Champions: Samut Sakhon City
- Relegated: Nonthaburi United
- T3 National Championship: Samut Sakhon City; Thonburi United
- Matches: 110
- Goals: 269 (2.45 per match)
- Top goalscorer: (Nigeria) Ademola Sodiq Adeyemi (13 goals; Thonburi United)
- Best goalkeeper: (Thailand) Kritchai Sangrung (8 clean sheets; Samut Sakhon City)
- Biggest home win: 5 goals difference Thonburi United 5–0 Hua Hin City (18 October 2025)
- Biggest away win: 3 goals difference Assumption United 1–4 Thap Luang United (27 September 2025); Samut Songkhram City 0–3 Samut Sakhon City (15 February 2026)
- Highest scoring: 6 goals VRN Muangnont 5–1 Rajpracha (21 September 2025); Samut Songkhram City 4–2 VRN Muangnont (18 October 2025); Assumption United 4–2 Nonthaburi United (10 January 2026); Rajpracha 4–2 Samut Songkhram City (15 March 2026)
- Longest winning run: 6 matches Samut Songkhram City
- Longest unbeaten run: 9 matches Suphanburi; Royal Thai Army
- Longest winless run: 14 matches Nonthaburi United
- Longest losing run: 10 matches Nonthaburi United
- Highest attendance: 3,978; Suphanburi 1–1 Royal Thai Army (22 February 2026)
- Lowest attendance: 44; Hua Hin City 1–1 Thonburi United (11 February 2026)
- Total attendance: 59,672
- Average attendance: 547

The 2025–26 Thai League 3 Western Region was part of the 2025–26 Thai League 3 Regional Stage, consisting of 11 clubs located in the western region of Thailand, along with some from the western part of the central region. The season commenced on 13 September 2025, with clubs competing in a round-robin format featuring home-and-away matches. The Regional Stage concluded on 22 March 2026, with the top two clubs advancing to the National Championship Stage, while the bottom-placed club was relegated to the Thailand Semi-pro League for the following season.

== Seasonal Changes ==
The 2025–26 Thai League 3 season features a number of changes compared to the previous campaign. These include the promotion and relegation of clubs between divisions, several club renamings and rebrandings, and the introduction of a new title sponsor, BYD Auto, which rebranded the competition as the BYD Dolphin League III for sponsorship reasons.

=== Relegation from Thai League 2 ===
Originally, three clubs were scheduled to be relegated from the 2024–25 Thai League 2 to the Thai League 3. However, during the 2024–25 season, Samut Prakan City withdrew and dissolved, leading to the annulment of all their league results. As a result, only two clubs were set to be relegated.

At the end of the season, Lampang, who had secured survival in Thai League 2, failed to obtain a license to participate in the 2025–26 season and was therefore demoted to the amateur level. Their place in Thai League 2 was retained by Pattaya United, who had originally been among the relegated clubs. Consequently, only one club was relegated to Thai League 3: Suphanburi, who finished bottom of the Thai League 2 standings. Suphanburi have been placed in the Western region of Thai League 3, in line with the location of their home ground in Western Thailand.

=== Promotions from Thailand Semi-pro League ===
Normally, the champions of each of the six regional groups of the 2025 Thailand Semi-pro League would be promoted to the Thai League 3. However, in the Western region, the champions, The Wall, failed club licensing and were denied promotion.

=== Club relegated due to club licensing failures ===
In addition to the regular relegations, one club was demoted from the Thai League 3 Western region after failing to obtain a club licensing certificate for the 2025–26 season.

- Maraleina – failed licensing and were relegated to the lower divisions.

=== Club relegated due to finishing last in the region ===
Alongside the licensing-related relegations, one club was demoted from the Thai League 3 Western region after finishing at the bottom of the respective regional leagues in the 2024–25 season.

- Kanchanaburi City – finished last in the Western region and were relegated.

=== Sponsorship and Broadcasting ===
In the 2025–26 season, Thai League 3 will operate under a title sponsorship arrangement for the first time: BYD Auto (through BYD Rêver Thailand) has become the main sponsor for all three professional tiers in Thailand, including Thai League 3, rebranding it as the BYD Dolphin League III.

On the broadcasting side, a landmark media rights deal was struck, giving AIS Play (in partnership with Gulf and JAS) exclusive rights to stream all matches from Thai Leagues 1, 2, and 3, plus domestic cups and youth competitions for the 2025–26 through 2028–29 seasons. Under this agreement, Thai League 3 matches can be watched live for free via AIS Play, and fans will no longer rely solely on individual clubs' streaming efforts (e.g., via YouTube or Facebook), as they did in previous seasons.

=== Club logo changes ===
2 clubs have changed their logos for the 2025–26 season of the Thai League 3 Western region:

- Samut Sakhon City, updated their crest ahead of the 2025–26 season. The previous circular logo, which featured a photographic tiger head within a blue border, was replaced with a shield-shaped design that retains the tiger motif but incorporates additional maritime elements, including an anchor and a ship's wheel, along with the inscription Since 2022.
- Samut Songkhram City, updated their crest ahead of the 2025–26 season. The previous version featured a red shield with a stylized stingray motif and the inscriptions "SSC 2021". The revised crest retained the red shield and stingray motif but adopted a more dimensional appearance and replaced the inscriptions with "Samut Songkhram City".

== Teams ==
=== Number of teams by province ===
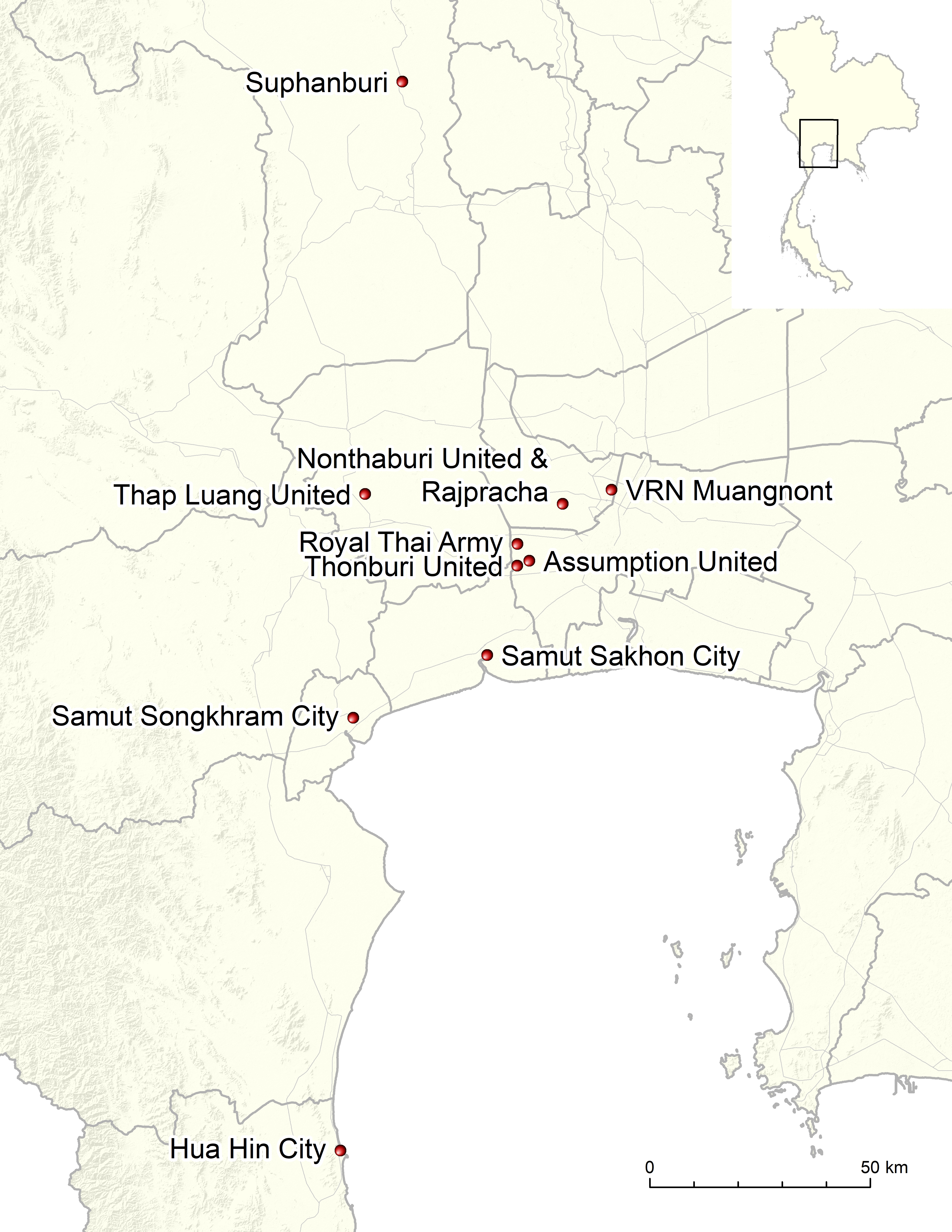
Locations of the 2025–26 Thai League 3 Western Region clubs.

Position	Province	Number	Teams
1	Bangkok	3	Assumption United, Royal Thai Army, and Thonburi United
1	Nonthaburi	3	Nonthaburi United, Rajpracha, and VRN Muangnont
3	Nakhon Pathom	1	Thap Luang United
3	Prachuap Khiri Khan	1	Hua Hin City
3	Samut Sakhon	1	Samut Sakhon City
3	Samut Songkhram	1	Samut Songkhram City
3	Suphanburi	1	Suphanburi

=== Stadiums and locations ===
Team	Location	Stadium	Coordinates
Assumption United	Bangkok (Bang Khae)	Wong Prachanukul Stadium	13°44′03″N 100°22′14″E
Hua Hin City	Prachuap Khiri Khan (Hua Hin)	Hua Hin Town Municipality Stadium	12°31′37″N 99°58′10″E
Nonthaburi United	Nonthaburi (Bang Yai)	Nonthaburi Stadium	13°51′03″N 100°26′28″E
Rajpracha	Nonthaburi (Bang Yai)	Nonthaburi Stadium	13°51′03″N 100°26′28″E
Royal Thai Army	Bangkok (Thawi Watthana)	Stadium of Bangkokthonburi University	13°46′09″N 100°20′44″E
Samut Sakhon City	Samut Sakhon (Mueang)	Stadium of Thailand National Sports University, Samut Sakhon Campus	13°32′30″N 100°16′52″E
Samut Songkhram City	Samut Songkhram (Mueang)	Samut Songkhram Stadium	13°24′51″N 100°00′00″E
Suphanburi	Suphanburi (Sam Chuk)	Stadium of Rajamangala University of Technology Suvarnabhumi, Suphanburi Campus	14°43′06″N 100°06′33″E
Thap Luang United	Nakhon Pathom (Mueang)	Thap Luang United Janded Stadium	13°52′23″N 100°01′37″E
Thonburi United	Bangkok (Nong Khaem)	Thonburi Stadium	13°43′28″N 100°20′43″E
VRN Muangnont	Nonthaburi (Mueang)	Nonthaburi City Municipality Stadium	13°52′44″N 100°32′39″E

=== Foreign players ===
A T3 team could register 3 foreign players from foreign players all around the world. A team can use 3 foreign players on the field in each game.

Note :
(substituted off) : players who released during second leg transfer window;
(substituted on) : players who registered during second leg transfer window.

AFC member countries players.
CAF member countries players.
CONCACAF member countries players.
CONMEBOL member countries players.
OFC member countries players.
UEFA member countries players.
No foreign player registered.

Club	Leg	Player 1	Player 2	Player 3
Assumption United	1st	(Brazil) Diego Patrocínio Nogueira Reis (substituted off)	(Chinese Taipei) Anthony Huang (substituted off)	(Ivory Coast) Diarrassouba Hamed de Silci
Assumption United	2nd		(South Korea) Jang Ji-min (substituted on)	(Ivory Coast) Diarrassouba Hamed de Silci
Hua Hin City	1st	(South Korea) Jung Hyun-wook (substituted off)	(South Korea) Woo Tae-min (substituted off)	(South Korea) Choi Min-hyeok
Hua Hin City	2nd	(Nigeria) Thompson Ekpe (substituted on)	(Canada) Kobe Liakat Dhanji (substituted on)	(South Korea) Choi Min-hyeok
Nonthaburi United	1st	(South Korea) Ryu Han-seo (substituted off)	(South Korea) Chu Woo-jun (substituted off)	(Nigeria) Debiro Dzarma Bata
Nonthaburi United	2nd	(Japan) Takuya Fushimi (substituted on)	(South Korea) Wan Jang (substituted on)	(Nigeria) Debiro Dzarma Bata
Rajpracha	1st	(Sweden) Axel Hjalmar Olsson (substituted off)	(Cameroon) Abbo Bouba (substituted off)	(North Korea) Choi Myeong-jae
Rajpracha	2nd	(Nigeria) Chijindu Sunday Edmund (substituted on)	(Ivory Coast) Diarra Junior Aboubacar (substituted on)	(North Korea) Choi Myeong-jae
Royal Thai Army	1st
Royal Thai Army	2nd
Samut Sakhon City	1st	(Brazil) Davison Assis Dutra de Moraes (substituted off)	(Brazil) Luís Felipe de Paula Marques Machado	(Brazil) Diogo Pereira
Samut Sakhon City	2nd	(Brazil) Diego Patrocínio Nogueira Reis (substituted on)	(Brazil) Luís Felipe de Paula Marques Machado	(Brazil) Diogo Pereira
Samut Songkhram City	1st	(Curaçao) Elson Hooi (substituted off)	(Brazil) Kaio Margues da Silva	(Nigeria) Ugwuoke Pascal Ozioma
Samut Songkhram City	2nd	(South Korea) Ahn Eung-wan (substituted on)	(Brazil) Kaio Margues da Silva	(Nigeria) Ugwuoke Pascal Ozioma
Suphanburi	1st		(Venezuela) Ronaldo David Rivas Vielma	(Japan) Kotaro Omori
Suphanburi	2nd	(Iran) Mohammad Ousani (substituted on)	(Venezuela) Ronaldo David Rivas Vielma	(Japan) Kotaro Omori
Thap Luang United	1st	(Ghana) Ozor Enoch (substituted off)	(Japan) Tomohiro Kajiyama (substituted off)	(Laos) Xaysavath Souvanhnasok (substituted off)
Thap Luang United	2nd		(Brazil) Pedro Augusto Silva Rodrigues (substituted on)	(England) Ismaila Diallo (substituted on)
Thonburi United	1st		(South Korea) Lee Jae-seung (substituted off)	(Nigeria) Ademola Sodiq Adeyemi
Thonburi United	2nd	(Brazil) Breno Souza Dias (substituted on)	(Iran) Abdolreza Zarei (substituted on)	(Nigeria) Ademola Sodiq Adeyemi
VRN Muangnont	1st	(Brazil) Vinícius Silva Freitas (substituted off)	(France) Queran Verset (substituted off)	(Nigeria) James Oise Jesuikhode
VRN Muangnont	2nd	(Morocco) Ayoub Elgannich (substituted on)	(Madagascar) Rahajanrina Lovasoalafatra Koloina (substituted on)	(Nigeria) James Oise Jesuikhode

== League table ==
=== Standings ===
Pos	Team	Pld	W	D	L	GF	GA	GD	Pts	Qualification or relegation
1	Samut Sakhon City (C, Q)	20	14	3	3	42	18	+24	45	Qualification to the National Championship stage
2	Thonburi United (Q)	20	11	6	3	35	18	+17	39	Qualification to the National Championship stage
3	Suphanburi	20	9	5	6	22	19	+3	32	
4	Thap Luang United	20	8	7	5	22	17	+5	31	
5	Samut Songkhram City	20	8	5	7	23	28	−5	29	
6	Assumption United	20	8	4	8	23	22	+1	28	
7	VRN Muangnont	20	5	8	7	24	27	−3	23	
8	Royal Thai Army	20	4	9	7	19	24	−5	21 (Note: The head-to-head record is tied; Royal Thai Army 3 pts (GD 0, GF 3), Hua Hin City 3 pts (GD 0, GF 3). Royal Thai Army is ahead in the overall goals difference.)	
9	Hua Hin City	20	5	6	9	21	30	−9	21	
10	Rajpracha	20	5	3	12	22	36	−14	18	
11	Nonthaburi United (R)	20	3	4	13	16	30	−14	13	Relegation to the Thailand Semi-pro League

Source: Thai League
Rules for classification: 1) Points; 2) Head-to-head points; 3) Head-to-head goal difference; 4) Head-to-head goal scored; 5) Overall goal difference; 6) Overall goal scored; 7) Fair play points; 8) Play-off without extra time).
(C) Champions; (Q) Qualified for the phase indicated; (R) Relegated

=== Positions by round ===
Team ╲ Round	1	2	3	4	5	6	7	8	9	10	11	12	13	14	15	16	17	18	19	20	21	22
Samut Sakhon City	2	1	2	2	1	2	2	2	2	1	1	1	1	1	1	1	1	1	1	1	1	1
Thonburi United	3	2	1	1	2	1	1	1	1	2	3	4	2	2	2	2	2	2	2	2	2	2
Suphanburi	7	10	8	9	6	7	7	5	7	6	7	7	7	6	5	5	3	4	3	3	3	3
Thap Luang United	11	7	4	5	7	5	6	8	6	5	6	6	5	5	6	7	6	6	6	4	4	4
Samut Songkhram City	4	4	5	3	4	3	3	3	3	3	2	2	4	4	4	4	5	5	5	6	6	5
Assumption United	10	5	9	4	5	4	4	4	4	4	4	3	3	3	3	3	4	3	4	5	5	6
VRN Muangnont	6	3	3	6	3	6	5	7	5	7	5	5	6	7	7	6	8	8	8	7	7	7
Royal Thai Army	5	8	10	10	10	11	11	11	11	11	10	8	8	8	8	8	7	7	7	8	8	8
Hua Hin City	8	9	6	7	8	10	8	6	8	8	8	9	9	9	10	10	10	10	10	9	9	9
Rajpracha	9	11	11	11	11	8	9	9	9	9	9	10	10	10	9	9	9	9	9	10	10	10
Nonthaburi United	1	6	7	8	9	9	10	10	10	10	11	11	11	11	11	11	11	11	11	11	11	11

Source: Thai League
= Qualification to the National Championship stage; = Relegation to the Thailand Semi-pro League

=== Results by round ===
Team ╲ Round	1	2	3	4	5	6	7	8	9	10	11	12	13	14	15	16	17	18	19	20	21	22
Samut Sakhon City	W	W	D	W	W	N	L	W	W	W	W	L	W	W	W	N	W	D	L	W	W	D
Thonburi United	W	W	W	W	N	W	D	L	W	D	L	D	W	D	N	D	W	D	W	L	W	W
Suphanburi	N	L	W	L	W	L	D	W	L	W	L	D	D	W	W	W	W	D	D	W	L	N
Thap Luang United	L	D	W	D	W	L	L	W	D	D	N	W	D	D	L	L	D	W	W	W	N	W
Samut Songkhram City	W	D	L	W	W	W	W	N	W	W	D	L	L	L	D	D	L	N	D	L	L	W
Assumption United	L	W	L	W	L	W	D	W	N	W	W	W	D	D	L	D	L	W	N	L	L	L
VRN Muangnont	D	W	N	L	W	L	D	W	L	D	D	W	N	L	D	D	L	L	D	W	L	D
Royal Thai Army	D	L	L	D	L	D	L	L	W	N	D	W	W	D	D	D	W	D	L	N	L	D
Hua Hin City	L	N	W	L	L	L	W	W	L	L	D	N	L	D	L	D	D	L	D	W	W	D
Rajpracha	L	L	D	N	W	D	L	W	L	L	L	L	L	N	W	W	L	L	D	L	W	L
Nonthaburi United	W	L	L	L	L	L	N	L	L	L	L	L	D	D	D	L	N	W	D	L	W	L

Source: Thai League
N = No match; W = Won; D = Drawn; L = Lost

=== Results ===
Home \ Away	ASU	HHC	NON	RCA	ARM	SKN	SKM	SPB	TLU	TBU	VMN
Assumption United	—	1–1	4–2	1–0	0–0	0–1	0–1	0–1	1–4	1–2	3–2
Hua Hin City	0–2	—	1–2	0–0	2–3	2–3	0–1	1–2	2–0	1–1	1–0
Nonthaburi United	0–2	1–2	—	0–1	1–2	0–2	0–0	0–0	0–1	1–2	1–1
Rajpracha	0–2	2–0	2–1	—	1–1	1–1	4–2	0–1	1–2	1–2	2–3
Royal Thai Army	0–2	0–1	1–2	2–0	—	3–1	0–0	0–2	0–0	1–2	0–0
Samut Sakhon City	3–0	2–2	2–0	4–0	4–1	—	2–3	2–1	1–0	2–1	4–0
Samut Songkhram City	1–0	0–2	2–1	3–2	2–2	0–3	—	2–0	1–1	0–1	4–2
Suphanburi	0–0	3–1	1–0	3–1	1–1	0–1	2–1	—	2–0	2–2	1–1
Thap Luang United	1–1	1–1	0–2	1–2	0–0	3–1	2–0	1–0	—	1–1	1–1
Thonburi United	2–3	5–0	1–1	2–1	2–1	1–1	4–0	2–0	0–1	—	2–0
VRN Muangnont	1–0	1–1	3–1	5–1	1–1	0–2	0–0	3–0	0–2	0–0	—

Source: Thai League
Legend: Blue = home team win; Yellow = draw; Red = away team win.
For upcoming matches, an "a" indicates there is an article about the rivalry between the two participants.
