= 2024–25 Thai League 3 Western Region =

Thai League 3 Western Region
- Season: 2024–25
- Dates: 14 September 2024 – 29 March 2025
- Champions: Samut Sakhon City
- Relegated: Maraleina; Kanchanaburi City
- T3 National Championship: Samut Sakhon City; Thonburi United
- Matches: 132
- Goals: 405 (3.07 per match)
- Top goalscorer: (Thailand) Phuwanet Thongkui (14 goals; Thap Luang United) (Thailand) Tanasrap Srikotapach (14 goals; Thonburi United)
- Best goalkeeper: (Thailand) Sutthiphat Noikhamsin (11 clean sheets; Thap Luang United)
- Biggest home win: 8 goals difference Thap Luang United 8–0 Kanchanaburi City (25 January 2025)
- Biggest away win: 5 goals difference Kanchanaburi City 0–5 Samut Sakhon City (21 September 2024)
- Highest scoring: 8 goals Thap Luang United 5–3 Maraleina (19 October 2024); Thap Luang United 8–0 Kanchanaburi City (25 January 2025); Thap Luang United 2–6 Thonburi United (23 February 2025)
- Longest winning run: 6 matches Rajpracha
- Longest unbeaten run: 8 matches Rajpracha; Thonburi United; VRN Muangnont
- Longest winless run: 14 matches Royal Thai Army
- Longest losing run: 5 matches Kanchanaburi City
- Highest attendance: 2,470; Thonburi United 4–2 Samut Sakhon City (24 November 2024)
- Lowest attendance: 0
- Total attendance: 33,077
- Average attendance: 254

The 2024–25 Thai League 3 Western Region is part of the 2024–25 Thai League 3 Regional Stage, consisting of 12 clubs located in the western region of Thailand, along with some from the western part of the central region. This region has undergone significant changes with clubs relocating into and out of the area to better align with their geographical locations. The season will commence on 14 September 2024, with clubs competing in a round-robin format featuring home-and-away matches. The Regional Stage will conclude on 29 March 2025, at which point the top two clubs will advance to the National Championship Stage, while the bottom-placed club will face relegation to the Thailand Semi-pro League for the following season. The Western Region's structure now better reflects its geographic identity. This stage brings together clubs from the lush landscapes and mountainous terrain of the West, where football continues to unite communities in a region of natural beauty.

== Seasonal Changes ==
=== Club redistribution ===
To accommodate the new regional structure, several clubs were reassigned:

- Nonthaburi United, Royal Thai Army, Samut Sakhon City, Thonburi United, and VRN Muangnont were transferred from the Bangkok Metropolitan Region (currently Central Region) to the Western Region.
- Angthong, Lopburi City, PTU Pathum Thani, and Saraburi United were transferred from the Western Region to the Central Region.

=== Promotion from Thailand Semi-pro League ===
Samut Songkhram City has been promoted from the Thailand Semi-pro League and will compete in the Western Region.

=== Relegation based on performance ===
Chainat United was relegated to the Thailand Semi-pro League after finishing last in the 2023–24 season.

=== Club logo changes ===
- Nonthaburi United introduced a new logo, replacing its previous bear-and-durian tree design with a more striking image of a crow, symbolizing resilience and adaptability.

== Teams ==
=== Number of teams by province ===
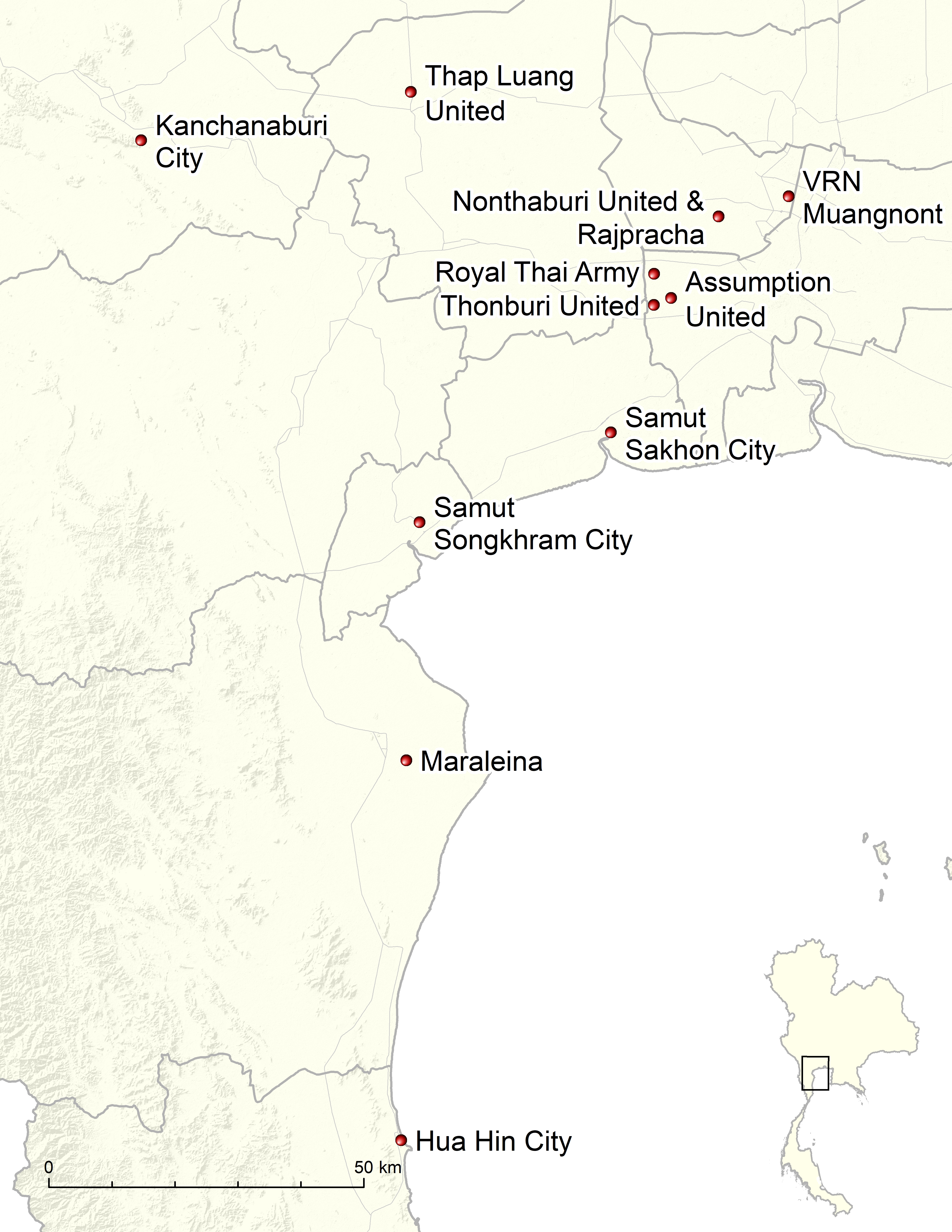
Locations of the 2024–25 Thai League 3 Western Region clubs.

Position	Province	Number	Teams
1	Bangkok	3	Assumption United, Royal Thai Army, and Thonburi United
1	Nonthaburi	3	Nonthaburi United, Rajpracha, and VRN Muangnont
3	Kanchanaburi	1	Kanchanaburi City
3	Nakhon Pathom	1	Thap Luang United
3	Phetchaburi	1	Maraleina
3	Prachuap Khiri Khan	1	Hua Hin City
3	Samut Sakhon	1	Samut Sakhon City
3	Samut Songkhram	1	Samut Songkhram City

=== Stadiums and locations ===
Team	Location	Stadium	Coordinates
Assumption United	Bangkok (Bang Khae)	Wong Prachanukul Stadium	13°44′03″N 100°22′14″E
Hua Hin City	Prachuap Khiri Khan (Hua Hin)	Hua Hin Town Municipality Stadium	12°31′37″N 99°58′10″E
Kanchanaburi City	Kanchanaburi (Tha Muang)	Khao Noi SAO. Stadium	13°57′48″N 99°35′35″E
Maraleina	Phetchaburi (Mueang)	Stadium of Phetchaburi Rajabhat University	13°04′20″N 99°58′45″E
Nonthaburi United	Nonthaburi (Bang Yai)	Nonthaburi Stadium	13°51′03″N 100°26′28″E
Rajpracha	Nonthaburi (Bang Yai)	Nonthaburi Stadium	13°51′03″N 100°26′28″E
Royal Thai Army	Bangkok (Thawi Watthana)	Stadium of Bangkokthonburi University	13°46′09″N 100°20′44″E
Samut Sakhon City	Samut Sakhon (Mueang)	Stadium of Thailand National Sports University, Samut Sakhon Campus	13°32′30″N 100°16′52″E
Samut Songkhram City	Samut Songkhram (Mueang)	Samut Songkhram Stadium	13°24′51″N 100°00′00″E
Thap Luang United	Nakhon Pathom (Kamphaeng Saen)	Stadium of Kasetsart University, Kamphaeng Saen Campus	14°01′55″N 99°59′22″E
Thonburi United	Bangkok (Nong Khaem)	Thonburi Stadium	13°43′28″N 100°20′43″E
VRN Muangnont	Nonthaburi (Mueang)	Nonthaburi City Municipality Stadium	13°52′44″N 100°32′39″E

=== Personnel and sponsoring ===
Note: Flags indicate national team as has been defined under FIFA eligibility rules. Players may hold more than one non-FIFA nationality; Club dissolved during season would shown by grey background.

Team	Manager	Captain	Kit
Assumption United			(Thailand) FBT
Hua Hin City	(Thailand) Jiradech Sangsanga		(Thailand) WOW Sport
Kanchanaburi City	(Thailand) Phayong Khunnaen		(Thailand) Vale Sport
Maraleina	(Ivory Coast) Abdoul Coulibaly		(Thailand) Made by club
Nonthaburi United			(Thailand) Mata Sport
Rajpracha	(Thailand) Pattanapong Sripramote		(Thailand) Warrix
Royal Thai Army	(Thailand) Chaiwat Nak-iem		(Thailand) KELA
Samut Sakhon City	(Thailand) Yai Nilwong		(Thailand) WOW Sport
Samut Songkhram City	(Thailand) Tongthinphu Rungroj	(Thailand) Pakpoom Poomsongtham	(Thailand) H3
Thap Luang United	(Thailand) Teerayut Ngamlamai	(Thailand) Raungchai Choothongchai	(Thailand) Imane
Thonburi United			(Thailand) Ego Sport
VRN Muangnont		(Thailand) Nathan Rongdet	(Thailand) Dula Sport

=== Foreign players ===
A T3 team could register 3 foreign players from foreign players all around the world. A team can use 3 foreign players on the field in each game.

Note :
(substituted off) : players who released during second leg transfer window;
(substituted on) : players who registered during second leg transfer window.

AFC member countries players.
CAF member countries players.
CONCACAF member countries players.
CONMEBOL member countries players.
OFC member countries players.
UEFA member countries players.
No foreign player registered.

Club	Leg	Player 1	Player 2	Player 3
Assumption United	1st	(Netherlands) Emile Linkers (substituted off)	(Nigeria) Riliwan Omolaja Okedara (substituted off)	(South Korea) Kim Woo-gyum (substituted off)
Assumption United	2nd		(Ivory Coast) Diarrassouba Hamed de Silci (substituted on)	(Nigeria) Umar Tahir (substituted on)
Hua Hin City	1st	(Tanzania) John Amos Mgong'os (substituted off)	(Brazil) Breno Souza Dias	(Brazil) Vinicius Silva Freitas
Hua Hin City	2nd	(Japan) Issei Kikuchi (substituted on)	(Brazil) Breno Souza Dias	(Brazil) Vinicius Silva Freitas
Kanchanaburi City	1st	(Ghana) Castle Ntih-Mensah (substituted off)	(South Korea) Kim Geon-woo	(South Korea) Kim Min-jae
Kanchanaburi City	2nd	(United States) Christian Joseph Sacchini (substituted on)	(South Korea) Kim Geon-woo	(South Korea) Kim Min-jae
Maraleina	1st	(Ivory Coast) Abdel Razak Diomande (substituted off)	(Cameroon) Isaac Honore Aime Mbengan (substituted off)	(Senegal) Tall Mouhamadou Fallou Mbacke
Maraleina	2nd	(American Samoa) Malik Sanou Diallo (substituted on)	(Laos) Sayfon Keohanam (substituted on)	(Senegal) Tall Mouhamadou Fallou Mbacke
Nonthaburi United	1st	(Portugal) Ayrton Cá (substituted off)	(South Korea) Baek Dong-ju (substituted off)	(South Korea) Lee Jae-yong
Nonthaburi United	2nd	(France) Shayn Djelloul Chekalil (substituted on)	(South Korea) Mun Te-su (substituted on)	(South Korea) Lee Jae-yong
Rajpracha	1st	(Brazil) Jonathan Andrade (substituted off)	(Serbia) Marko Milenkovic (substituted off)	(Spain) Sergi Valls
Rajpracha	2nd	(Nigeria) Timothy Chiemerie Okereke (substituted on)	(Russia) Erik Zaerko (substituted on)	(Spain) Sergi Valls
Royal Thai Army	1st
Royal Thai Army	2nd
Samut Sakhon City	1st	(Brazil) Yuri Martins Rocha (substituted off)	(Ghana) Abdul Kharim Ayeh (substituted off)	(Brazil) Filipe Vasconcelos Paim
Samut Sakhon City	2nd	(Brazil) Thiago Duchatsch (substituted on)	(Republic of the Congo) Burnel Okana-Stazi (substituted on)	(Brazil) Filipe Vasconcelos Paim
Samut Songkhram City	1st	(Argentina) Lucas Daniel Echenique (substituted off)	(Nigeria) Chijindu Sunday Edmund (substituted off)	(Iran) Amirmohammad Karamdar
Samut Songkhram City	2nd	(Brazil) Leonardo Pimentel Ferreira (substituted on)	(Nigeria) Ugwuoke Pascal Ozioma (substituted on)	(Iran) Amirmohammad Karamdar
Thap Luang United	1st	(Nigeria) Raoul Uche Nduka (substituted off)	(Nigeria) Njika Chukwuka Chidi Valentine (substituted off)	(Laos) Phoutthasay Khochalern
Thap Luang United	2nd	(Nigeria) Chijindu Sunday Edmund (substituted on)	(South Korea) Kang Eui-chan (substituted on)	(Laos) Phoutthasay Khochalern
Thonburi United	1st	(India) Mecievi Khieya (substituted off)	(Nigeria) Opeyaemi Korede Ajayi	(Ivory Coast) Bouda Henry Ismaël
Thonburi United	2nd	(Brazil) Emerson da Silva Tavares (substituted on)	(Nigeria) Opeyaemi Korede Ajayi	(Ivory Coast) Bouda Henry Ismaël
VRN Muangnont	1st		(Guinea) Barry Lelouma (substituted off)	(Ghana) Lord Arko (substituted off)
VRN Muangnont	2nd	(Colombia) David Alberto Palomino Cartagena (substituted on)	(Republic of Ireland) Rio Derek Bradley Smith (substituted on)	(Nigeria) Ezike Christian Uchenna (substituted on)

== League table ==
=== Standings ===
Pos	Team	Pld	W	D	L	GF	GA	GD	Pts	Qualification or relegation
1	Samut Sakhon City (C, Q)	22	16	3	3	49	19	+30	51 (Note: The head-to-head record is tied; Samut Sakhon City 3 pts (GD 0, GF 4), Thonburi United 3 pts (GD 0, GF 4). Samut Sakhon City is ahead on the overall goals difference.)	Qualification to the National Championship stage
2	Thonburi United (Q)	22	16	3	3	54	26	+28	51	Qualification to the National Championship stage
3	Rajpracha	22	13	5	4	38	23	+15	44	
4	Thap Luang United	22	11	7	4	45	22	+23	40	
5	VRN Muangnont	22	7	9	6	30	22	+8	30	
6	Samut Songkhram City	22	7	6	9	34	35	−1	27	
7	Hua Hin City	22	7	5	10	41	52	−11	26 (Note: Hua Hin City ahead on head-to-head points record; Hua Hin City 4 pts, Nonthaburi United 1 pt.)	
8	Nonthaburi United	22	7	5	10	28	31	−3	26	
9	Assumption United	22	6	4	12	25	44	−19	22	
10	Maraleina (R)	22	3	7	12	18	38	−20	16	Relegation to the Thailand Semi-pro League (Note: Maraleina was administratively relegated to the 2026 Thailand Semi-pro League for failing to meet club licensing standards.)
11	Royal Thai Army	22	2	9	11	23	40	−17	15	
12	Kanchanaburi City (R)	22	3	5	14	20	53	−33	14	Relegation to the Thailand Semi-pro League

Source: Thai League
Rules for classification: 1) Points; 2) Head-to-head points; 3) Head-to-head goal difference; 4) Head-to-head goal scored; 5) Overall goal difference; 6) Overall goal scored; 7) Fair play points; 8) Play-off without extra time).
(C) Champions; (Q) Qualified for the phase indicated; (R) Relegated

=== Positions by round ===
Team ╲ Round	1	2	3	4	5	6	7	8	9	10	11	12	13	14	15	16	17	18	19	20	21	22
Samut Sakhon City	4	1	1	1	1	1	1	1	1	1	2	1	2	2	1	1	2	2	2	2	1	1
Thonburi United	2	3	7	5	4	5	4	2	2	2	1	2	1	1	2	2	1	1	1	1	2	2
Rajpracha	5	6	4	6	6	6	6	6	5	4	4	3	4	4	4	3	3	3	3	3	3	3
Thap Luang United	8	4	3	3	5	3	5	4	4	3	3	4	3	3	3	4	4	4	4	4	4	4
VRN Muangnont	3	5	6	8	7	8	8	8	8	8	8	7	7	7	7	7	6	6	5	5	5	5
Samut Songkhram City	7	9	9	9	10	10	9	10	10	11	11	9	9	9	9	9	9	9	9	9	8	6
Hua Hin City	1	2	2	2	2	2	2	3	3	5	5	6	6	5	6	5	5	5	6	7	7	7
Nonthaburi United	9	7	5	4	3	4	3	5	6	6	6	5	5	6	5	6	7	7	7	6	6	8
Assumption United	11	11	8	7	8	7	7	7	7	7	7	8	8	8	8	8	8	8	8	8	9	9
Maraleina	10	8	10	11	11	11	11	9	9	9	9	10	10	11	12	12	11	11	11	11	10	10
Royal Thai Army	6	10	11	10	9	9	10	11	11	12	12	12	11	12	10	11	10	10	10	10	11	11
Kanchanaburi City	12	12	12	12	12	12	12	12	12	10	10	11	12	10	11	10	12	12	12	12	12	12

Source: Thai League
= Qualification to the National Championship stage; = Relegation to the Thailand Semi-pro League

=== Results by round ===
Team ╲ Round	1	2	3	4	5	6	7	8	9	10	11	12	13	14	15	16	17	18	19	20	21	22
Samut Sakhon City	W	W	W	D	W	W	W	L	D	W	L	W	D	W	W	W	L	W	W	W	W	W
Thonburi United	W	D	L	W	W	D	W	W	W	W	W	L	W	W	D	W	W	W	W	W	L	W
Rajpracha	D	W	W	L	L	W	L	W	W	W	D	W	D	L	D	W	W	W	W	W	W	D
Thap Luang United	D	W	W	D	D	W	L	W	D	W	W	L	W	L	D	D	L	W	W	W	W	D
VRN Muangnont	W	D	L	D	D	L	L	W	D	D	D	W	W	D	D	L	W	L	W	L	D	W
Samut Songkhram City	D	L	L	D	L	L	W	L	L	L	D	W	D	D	W	L	D	W	L	W	W	W
Hua Hin City	W	D	W	D	W	D	W	L	W	L	L	D	L	W	L	W	L	L	D	L	L	L
Nonthaburi United	L	W	W	D	W	D	W	L	L	D	D	W	D	L	W	L	L	L	L	W	L	L
Assumption United	L	L	W	W	L	W	L	W	L	L	W	L	L	W	L	D	D	D	D	L	L	L
Maraleina	L	D	L	L	D	L	D	W	D	L	L	D	D	L	L	D	W	L	L	L	W	L
Royal Thai Army	D	L	L	D	D	D	L	L	D	L	D	L	D	L	W	L	W	D	L	L	D	L
Kanchanaburi City	L	L	L	D	L	L	D	L	D	W	D	L	L	W	L	D	L	L	L	L	L	W

Source: Thai League
W = Won; D = Drawn; L = Lost

=== Results ===
Home \ Away	ASU	HHC	KCC	MLN	NON	RCA	ARM	SKN	SKM	TLU	TBU	VMN
Assumption United	—	2–2	2–1	0–2	1–2	3–2	1–1	0–4	1–2	0–1	1–4	0–2
Hua Hin City	2–0	—	4–0	1–1	2–1	2–5	4–2	0–2	4–3	0–3	3–0	1–0
Kanchanaburi City	1–1	3–2	—	0–1	1–2	3–3	2–0	0–5	0–2	0–2	1–3	1–1
Maraleina	1–4	2–2	0–0	—	1–3	0–3	0–0	1–1	0–1	1–1	1–3	0–2
Nonthaburi United	4–1	2–2	1–0	0–0	—	0–1	3–2	0–2	2–2	1–4	0–0	1–0
Rajpracha	0–2	2–1	4–0	1–0	2–1	—	1–0	2–1	2–1	0–0	1–2	3–2
Royal Thai Army	1–2	3–3	2–2	3–1	3–2	0–2	—	0–0	2–3	0–3	0–2	2–2
Samut Sakhon City	3–2	4–3	2–0	1–0	3–2	2–0	3–0	—	2–0	3–1	2–0	2–0
Samut Songkhram City	1–1	4–1	1–2	1–2	1–0	1–1	0–0	1–3	—	2–0	1–2	3–3
Thap Luang United	2–0	5–0	8–0	5–3	1–0	0–0	0–0	2–2	3–1	—	2–6	1–1
Thonburi United	6–0	3–1	3–2	4–1	2–1	2–2	2–0	4–2	3–2	2–1	—	1–1
VRN Muangnont	0–1	5–1	4–1	2–0	0–0	0–1	2–2	1–0	1–1	0–0	1–0	—

Source: Thai League
Legend: Blue = home team win; Yellow = draw; Red = away team win.
For upcoming matches, an "a" indicates there is an article about the rivalry between the two participants.

== Season statistics ==
=== Top scorers ===
As of 29 March 2025.

Rank	Player	Club	Goals
1	(Thailand) Phuwanet Thongkui	Thap Luang United	14
1	(Thailand) Tanasrap Srikotapach	Thonburi United	14
3	(Nigeria) Edmund Sunday	Samut Songkhram City (6 Goals); Thap Luang United (7 Goals)	13
3	(Thailand) Piyaphong Phrueksupee	Thonburi United	13
5	(Brazil) Breno Souza Dias	Hua Hin City	10

=== Hat-tricks ===
Player	For	Against	Result	Date
(Thailand) Thanadon Yankaew	Nonthaburi United	Assumption United	4–1 (H)	22 September 2024
(Thailand) Thanadon Yankaew	Nonthaburi United	Royal Thai Army	3–2 (H)	27 October 2024
(Ivory Coast) Bouda Henry Ismael	Thonburi United	Kanchanaburi City	1–3 (A)	3 November 2024
(Thailand) Wuttichat Yiamming	Thap Luang United	Kanchanaburi City	8–0 (H)	25 January 2025
(Nigeria) Ugwuoke Pascal Ozioma	Samut Songkhram City	Hua Hin City	4–1 (H)	8 February 2025
(Thailand) Tanasrap Srikotapach	Thonburi United	Thap Luang United	2–6 (A)	23 February 2025
(Nigeria) Okereke Timothy Chiemerie^{4}	Rajpracha	Hua Hin City	2–5 (A)	2 March 2025

=== Clean sheets ===
As of 29 March 2025.

Rank	Player	Club	Clean sheets
1	(Thailand) Sutthiphat Noikhamsin	Thap Luang United	11
2	(Thailand) Nopparat Seenareang	Samut Sakhon City	7
2	(Thailand) Surakrai Haphonram	VRN Muangnont	7
4	(Thailand) Rattanachat Neamtaisong	Rajpracha	6
5	(Thailand) Anusit Termmee	Samut Sakhon City	5

== Attendances ==
=== Overall statistical table ===
Pos	Team	Total	High	Low	Average	Change
1	Thonburi United	6,614	2,470	277	601	+121.8%
2	Samut Sakhon City	4,226	765	0	423	+50.0%
3	Hua Hin City	3,094	813	106	281	+52.7%
4	Thap Luang United	2,971	515	195	270	+1.1%
5	Nonthaburi United	2,951	570	129	268	+82.3%
6	Assumption United	2,441	575	50	222	+13.8%
7	Rajpracha	2,329	345	80	212	+47.2%
8	Samut Songkhram City	2,152	400	83	196	−51.0%^{↑}
9	VRN Muangnont	2,123	288	120	193	+22.9%
10	Royal Thai Army	1,868	330	82	170	−1.2%
11	Maraleina	1,212	237	0	121	−26.7%
12	Kanchanaburi City	1,096	185	38	100	−29.6%
	League total	33,077	2,470	0	254	−2.3%

Updated to games played on 29 March 2025
Source: Thai League

=== Attendances by home match played ===
Team \ Match played	1	2	3	4	5	6	7	8	9	10	11	Total
Assumption United	175	180	330	575	150	230	50	310	151	60	230	2,441
Hua Hin City	200	127	106	350	270	228	210	813	475	175	140	3,094
Kanchanaburi City	176	185	135	67	38	57	125	150	56	47	60	1,096
Maraleina	150	100	85	237	150	150	Unk.2	150	60	50	80	1,212
Nonthaburi United	170	522	425	167	182	250	211	129	175	150	570	2,951
Rajpracha	186	176	210	139	172	80	236	252	345	288	245	2,329
Royal Thai Army	194	146	124	114	156	82	330	142	270	168	142	1,868
Samut Sakhon City	270	Unk.1	340	320	445	347	543	472	487	237	765	4,226
Samut Songkhram City	280	122	291	102	94	300	83	245	115	400	120	2,152
Thap Luang United	200	515	350	310	195	250	214	213	292	214	218	2,971
Thonburi United	340	475	577	370	2,470	277	427	320	380	653	325	6,614
VRN Muangnont	288	180	210	180	200	139	168	253	120	150	235	2,123

Note:
Unk.1 Some error of T3 official match report 29 September 2024 (Samut Sakhon City 3–0 Royal Thai Army).
Unk.2 Some error of T3 official match report 2 February 2025 (Maraleina 1–3 Thonburi United).
