= 2023–24 Thai League 3 Cup =

BGC Muang Thai Insurance Cup

Tournament details
- Country: Thailand
- Dates: 27 September 2023 – 3 March 2024
- Teams: 58

Final positions
- Champions: Phatthalung (1st title)
- Runners-up: Maejo United

Tournament statistics
- Matches played: 59
- Goals scored: 183 (3.1 per match)
- Top goal scorer(s): Lucas Gaudencio Moraes (6 goals)

Awards
- Best player: Jhonatan Bernardo

The 2023–24 Thai League 3 Cup is the 1st season of a Thailand's knockout football competition. Matches in all rounds are single-legged, except for the semi-finals, which have been two-legged since the competition began. The semi-finals were the exception to this when the away goals rule and penalties were introduced. It was sponsored by BG Container Glass (BGC) and Muang Thai Insurance (MTI), and known as the BGC Muang Thai Insurance Cup (Thai: บีจีซี เมืองไทยประกันภัย คัพ) for sponsorship purposes. 58 clubs in the 2023–24 Thai League 3 were accepted into the tournament, and it began with the first qualification round on 27 September 2023 and concluded with the final on 3 March 2024. The prize money for this prestigious award is said to be around 3 million baht and the runners-up will be netting 1 million baht.

== Calendar ==
Round	Date	Matches	Clubs	New entries this round
First qualification round	27 September 2023	1	2 → 1	2 2023–24 Thai League 3
Second qualification round	18–25 October 2023	25	1 + 49 → 25	49 2023–24 Thai League 3
First round	8 November 2023	16	25 + 7 → 16	7 2023–24 Thai League 3
Second round	22 November 2023	8	16 → 8	
Quarter-finals	13 December 2023	4	8 → 4	
Semi-finals	17 January 2024 (1st leg); 14 February 2024 (2nd leg)	4	4 → 2	
Final	3 March 2024	1	2 → Champions	
Total				58 clubs

== Results ==
Note: N: Clubs from Northern region; NE: Clubs from Northeastern region; E: Clubs from Eastern region; W: Clubs from Western region; S: Clubs from Southern region; BM: Clubs from Bangkok metropolitan region.

=== First qualification round ===
2 clubs from 2023–24 Thai League 3 have signed to first qualify in the 2023–24 Thai League 3 cup. This round was drawn on 21 September 2023. 3 goals occurred in this round.

Eastern region
The qualifying round would be played in the eastern region featuring 2 clubs from the 2023–24 Thai League 3 Eastern Region.

27 September 2023	Navy (E)	2–1	Chanthaburi United (E)	Sattahip, Chonburi
15:00 (UTC+7)	Prawit Bureeted 68'; Pongpan Parapan 86'	Report; Highlight	Emerson da Silva Tavares 65'	Stadium: Sattahip Navy Stadium; Attendance: 150; Referee: Palathip Homwarn; Assistant referees: Kanakorn Teansawat, Chaiwat Rupsa-at; Fourth official: Monruedee Junmai

=== Second qualification round ===
The second qualifying round would feature 1 club that were the winner of the first qualification round and the new entries that were 49 clubs from the 2023–24 Thai League 3. 78 goals occurred in this round.

Northern region
The qualifying round would be played in the northern region featuring 6 clubs from the 2023–24 Thai League 3 Northern Region.

18 October 2023	Nakhon Sawan See Khwae City (N)	3–0	Northern Nakhon Mae Sot United (N)	Mueang, Nakhon Sawan
15:00 (UTC+7)	Issei Kikuchi 75'; Piyaruck Kwangkaew 80'; Vinícius Silva Freitas 90+3'	Report		Stadium: Stadium of Nakhon Sawan Sports School; Attendance: 150; Referee: Chirawat Chomphoosee; Assistant referees: Suwit Kongtongnok, Michai Changhirai; Fourth official: Thanison Onjiw

18 October 2023	Kamphaengphet (N)	0–1	Phitsanulok (N)	Mueang, Kamphaengphet
15:00 (UTC+7)		Report	Nonthaphut Panaimthon 83'	Stadium: Cha Kung Rao Stadium; Attendance: 90; Referee: Supat Chaingam; Assistant referees: Saksit Jantain, Weera Banlengchai; Fourth official: Supacha Chomchid

18 October 2023	Khelang United (N)	2–1	Kongkrailas United (N)	Mueang, Lampang
15:00 (UTC+7)	Kritsada Taiwong 47'; Mathas Kajaree 70'	Report	Jaturong Aiyarakhom 28'	Stadium: Stadium of Lampang Rajabhat University; Referee: Ekkachai Juywong; Assistant referees: Samart Thongdonngao, Patarathon Khamsawang; Fourth official: Sirikron Lorboon

Northeastern region
The qualifying round would be played in the northeastern region featuring 12 clubs from the 2023–24 Thai League 3 Northeastern Region.

18 October 2023	Nakhon Ratchasima United (NE)	0–2	Udon United (NE)	Mueang, Nakhon Ratchasima
15:00 (UTC+7)		Report	Pitipong Wongbut 6'; Kittiphong Pluemjai 14'	Stadium: Stadium of Fort Suranaree; Attendance: 30; Referee: Pongdanai Sadsadee; Assistant referees: Komkrit Sawong, Natthapat Phumek; Fourth official: Sittichai Saramai

18 October 2023	Suranaree Black Cat (NE)	0–2	Mahasarakham SBT (NE)	Mueang, Nakhon Ratchasima
15:00 (UTC+7)		Report	Wanit Jaisaen 41', 81'	Stadium: Stadium of Suranaree University of Technology; Attendance: 116; Referee: Palakon Hasuk; Assistant referees: Sutiwat Kaewkhunthong, Saengsuree Pochana; Fourth official: Manuschai Chawong

18 October 2023	Khon Kaen Mordindang (NE)	3–3 (a.e.t.) (3–4 p)	Surin City (NE)	Mueang, Khon Kaen
15:00 (UTC+7)	Chetsadaporn Makkharom 8'; Tanapol Srithong 90+4', 115' (pen.)	Report	Surasak Bunjan 76'; Worapart Chaenram 81'; Nattawut Wutthiya 120'	Stadium: Stadium of Khon Kaen University; Attendance: 200; Referee: Chalermpon Thongsri; Assistant referees: Nopphadet Rangkrathok, Kitti Phomsin; Fourth official: Preecha Chuchartchuart
	Penalties
	Tanapol Srithong (penalty scored); Bancha Phromkhot (penalty missed); Kittin Lorjanad (penalty missed); Kritsana Khanwong (penalty scored); Possawat Wichaiwong (penalty scored)		(penalty scored) Komen Sangsamanan; (penalty missed) Nattawut Wutthiya; (penalty scored) Surasak Bunjan; (penalty scored) Kiattisak Boonyuen; (penalty scored) Noppadol Rojchanakongyoo

18 October 2023	Ubon Kruanapat (NE)	3–2	Khon Kaen (NE)	Khueang Nai, Ubon Ratchathani
17:00 (UTC+7)	Oscar Plape 49', 83'; Kittipoom Bunsong 86'	Report	Alberto Moreira Gouvea 11', 43'	Stadium: Stadium of Ubon Ratchathani Rajabhat University, Ban Yang Noi Campus; Referee: Sittisak Kaewkam; Assistant referees: Suriyawong Ramsri, Kulthawat Sisanong; Fourth official: Tharanon Naowapan

18 October 2023	Muang Loei United (NE)	1–2	Sisaket United (NE)	Mueang, Loei
18:00 (UTC+7)	Makan Diawara 51'	Report	Piyanath Chanrum 3'; Wongsakorn Saenruecha 13'	Stadium: Stadium of Loei Rajabhat University; Attendance: 219; Referee: Warakorn Suraporn; Assistant referees: Mongkol Uthainang, Chanatip Meechai; Fourth official: Chaloemwong Sowannakan

25 October 2023	Yasothon (NE)	2–4	Surin Khong Chee Mool (NE)	Mueang, Yasothon
15:00 (UTC+7)	Jetsada Artyatha 85'; Sutthipong Duangthungsa 87'	Report	Natipong Sriphet 2'; Poosit Sukreum 67'; Chayangkun Keawpasan 75', 90'	Stadium: Yasothon PAO. Stadium; Attendance: 50; Referee: Surawut Nuanyoi; Assistant referees: Thammanoon Sasen, Athipbordee Seekhoaun; Fourth official: Warutsom Sompan

Eastern region
The qualifying round would be played in the eastern region featuring 10 clubs from the 2023–24 Thai League 3 Eastern Region.

18 October 2023	Saimit Kabin United (E)	3–1	Prachinburi City (E)	Kabin Buri, Prachinburi
15:00 (UTC+7)	Surachet Khunnu 44'; Sutayut Ura 52'; Emerson Felipe Alves Peixoto de Almeida 69'	Report	Jaturong Pimkoon 54'	Stadium: Nomklao Maharat Stadium; Attendance: 400; Referee: Somsuk Poosomnuek; Assistant referees: Chinnaphat Lablae, Siravich Konngam; Fourth official: Peerapol Panyatong

18 October 2023	BFB Pattaya City (E)	0–2	Bankhai United (E)	Si Racha, Chonburi
15:00 (UTC+7)		Report	Teerapat Watyota 53'; Arthit Nongdai 65'	Stadium: Si Racha Town Municipality Stadium; Attendance: 150; Referee: Chayapol Laosuphan; Assistant referees: Narit Mungtoemklang, Ekkalak Muangkhotr; Fourth official: Theerapon Nakthong

18 October 2023	Navy (E)	3–0	Chachoengsao Hi-Tek (E)	Sattahip, Chonburi
15:00 (UTC+7)	Sirimongkhon Jitbanjong 26'; Pongpan Parapan 64'; Songsang Moungyon 82'	Report		Stadium: Sattahip Navy Stadium; Attendance: 120; Referee: Panya Nawasimainam; Assistant referees: Chaiwat Rupsa-at, Peeyaporn Worachaikueakun; Fourth official: Pornthep Promsopa

18 October 2023	ACDC (E)	0–2	Pluakdaeng United (E)	Sattahip, Chonburi
15:00 (UTC+7)		Report	Bernard Owusu Mintah 70'; Alongkorn Nuekmai 87'	Stadium: Battleship Stadium; Referee: Booncharoen Phochai; Assistant referees: Theerayut Radarit, Watcharit Longjit; Fourth official: Attapol Soheng

19 October 2023	Marines (E)	0–3	Fleet (E)	Sattahip, Chonburi
15:00 (UTC+7)		Report	Vorakan Kavila 40'; Jakrayut Vivatvanit 69'; Phanuwit Jitsanoh 79'	Stadium: Sattahip Navy Stadium; Attendance: 150; Referee: Niruch Panjontuk; Assistant referees: Poomin Lanamtaing, Komsan Wantavee; Fourth official: Thawatchai Sangsanit

Western region
The qualifying round would be played in the western region featuring 6 clubs from the 2023–24 Thai League 3 Western Region.

18 October 2023	PTU Pathum Thani (W)	3–1	Angthong (W)	Bang Sai, Ayutthaya
15:00 (UTC+7)	Panupong Hawan 5'; Ma Ye-sung 34', 47'	Report	Natthakit Aiamiaoo 90+1'	Stadium: Ratchakram Stadium; Attendance: 150; Referee: Yuttana Sadkrathok; Assistant referees: Patcharapon Losomsup, Krisit Homhual; Fourth official: Patcharapong Chiangta

18 October 2023	Hua Hin City (W)	1–1 (a.e.t.) (5–6 p)	Thap Luang United (W)	Hua Hin, Prachuap Khiri Khan
15:00 (UTC+7)	Chatchai Phithanmet 56'	Report	Phuwanet Thongkhui 41'	Stadium: Hua Hin Town Municipality Stadium; Attendance: 100; Referee: Arun Budtasee; Assistant referees: Thanaphon Chaowanon, Den Bunyakittakun; Fourth official: Arthit Lanongkhan
	Penalties
	Kittisak Pongsanin (penalty missed); Pornnarong Rodjakthuk (penalty missed); Kanok Sangkasopha (penalty scored); Chatchai Phithanmet (penalty scored); Jiradech Seangsanga (penalty scored); Sitthichai Seangjun (penalty scored); Worachet Tarasap (penalty scored); Thanyawut Phichitwanakam (penalty missed)		(penalty scored) Tanakrit Henthong; (penalty scored) Siwa Pikulhom; (penalty missed) Poonyawee Sri-on; (penalty missed) Wasathon Aumyen; (penalty scored) Phuwanet Thongkhui; (penalty scored) Adisak Yocha-on; (penalty scored) Thirawat Khoonsom; (penalty scored) Kenta Aso

18 October 2023	Lopburi City (W)	3–2	Kanchanaburi City (W)	Mueang, Lopburi
16:00 (UTC+7)	Thiranai Srichaiwan 54'; Lucas Gaudencio Moraes 68'; Monchit Wanna 90+2'	Report	Ayuwat Thongprasan 51'; Mardochée Kaham Seuntcha 90+4'	Stadium: Phra Ramesuan Stadium; Attendance: 120; Referee: Saravut Suksalee; Assistant referees: Sasina Thongkham, Kittichok Huthip; Fourth official: Chanitpol Tarawan

Southern region
The qualifying round would be played in the southern region featuring 6 clubs from the 2023–24 Thai League 3 Southern Region.

18 October 2023	Wiang Sa Surat Thani City (S)	1–2	Pattani (S)	Wiang Sa, Surat Thani
15:00 (UTC+7)	Suttipong Yaifai 24'	Report	Khoiree Layeng 30'; Marapee Wani 70'	Stadium: Ban Song Subdistrict Municipality Stadium; Attendance: 125; Referee: Tiwakorn Sawangpong; Assistant referees: Hafit Chamnian, Pumipat Arwutpet; Fourth official: Nattawut Sangpan

18 October 2023	Phatthalung (S)	3–1	Muang Trang United (S)	Mueang, Phatthalung
18:00 (UTC+7)	Mitsada Saitaifah 53'; Zachary Singh Binrong 61'; Aphisit Chuayklab 80'	Report	Arnon Panmeethong 84'	Stadium: Phatthalung PAO. Stadium; Attendance: 300; Referee: Iffan Phanwang; Assistant referees: Wisarut Damthaklong, Tanakorn Tala; Fourth official: Nakarin Kanantai

19 October 2023	MH Nakhon Si City (S)	3–1	Satun (S)	Ron Phibun, Nakhon Si Thammarat
9:00 (UTC+7)	Edson dos Santos Costa Júnior 19', 33', 39'	Report	Chamsuddeen Shoteng 45' (pen.)	Stadium: Nakhon Si Thammarat PAO. Stadium; Attendance: 220; Referee: Montree Yeereem; Assistant referees: Alif Nalee, Asro Dueramae; Fourth official: Pornsak Paksan

Bangkok metropolitan region
The qualifying round would be played in the Bangkok metropolitan region featuring 10 clubs from the 2023–24 Thai League 3 Bangkok Metropolitan Region.

18 October 2023	Prime Bangkok (BM)	2–1	Bangkok (BM)	Bang Kapi, Bangkok
15:00 (UTC+7)	Chawanwit Saelao 1', 34'	Report	Phattharaphol Khamsuk 79'	Stadium: Stadium of Ramkhamhaeng University; Attendance: 250; Referee: Pongtut Ananta-art; Assistant referees: Sopon Boonlest, Palakorn Parasatit; Fourth official: Suthipong Teekhasuk

18 October 2023	AUU Inter Bangkok (BM)	3–0	The iCON RSU (BM)	Min Buri, Bangkok
15:00 (UTC+7)	Sarfo Otis Adjei 4', 7', 83'	Report		Stadium: 72nd Anniversary Stadium, Min Buri; Attendance: 66; Referee: Pichit Thongjanmoon; Assistant referees: Apiwich Mukdahan, Niracha Sangprasit; Fourth official: Supiree Testhomya

18 October 2023	Kasem Bundit University (BM)	0–1	Samut Sakhon City (BM)	Min Buri, Bangkok
15:00 (UTC+7)		Report	Chayaphat Srirat 73'	Stadium: Stadium of Kasem Bundit University; Attendance: 110; Referee: Danai Yommool; Assistant referees: Tibeth Longtree, Pichet Chumcha; Fourth official: Nattaphak Sawasdee

18 October 2023	Thonburi United (BM)	1–1 (a.e.t.) (3–2 p)	Chamchuri United (BM)	Nong Khaem, Bangkok
15:00 (UTC+7)	Tanasrap Srikotapach 57'	Report	Naphop Janhom 13' (o.g.)	Stadium: Thonburi Stadium; Attendance: 200; Referee: Song Montha; Assistant referees: Watchara Wongkhan, Tanakorn Leechaisathaporn; Fourth official: Adipat Ketsai
	Penalties
	Thanakorn Woharnklong (penalty missed); Piyaphong Phrueksupee (penalty scored); Sirakorn Pimbaotham (penalty scored); Methapon Monyai (penalty scored); Ramiro Lizaso (penalty missed)		(penalty scored) Prachpeecha Pachthong; (penalty scored) Prommin Pindeaw; (penalty missed) Kittin Dumsumran; (penalty missed) Woradach Boonmakhajornkit; (penalty missed) Iklas Sanron

18 October 2023	VRN Muangnont (BM)	0–2	Samut Prakan (BM)	Bang Yai, Nonthaburi
15:00 (UTC+7)		Report	Danai James Smart 5'; Bhumchanok Kamkla 90+1'	Stadium: Nonthaburi Stadium; Attendance: 86; Referee: Thapana Thaworn; Assistant referees: Natthakit Konfu, Nanthawat Chobsuan; Fourth official: Dassakhon Hokla

=== First round ===
The first round would feature 25 clubs that were the winners of the second qualification round and the new entries that were 7 clubs from the 2023–24 Thai League 3. This round was drawn on 27 October 2023. 50 goals occurred in this round.

Upper region
The first round would be played in the upper region featuring 5 clubs from the 2023–24 Thai League 3 Northern Region, 6 clubs from the 2023–24 Thai League 3 Northeastern Region, and 5 clubs from the 2023–24 Thai League 3 Eastern Region.

8 November 2023	Surin City (NE)	1–0	Pluakdaeng United (E)	Mueang, Surin
15:00 (UTC+7)	Kantaphong Chanthaworn 53'	Report		Stadium: Sri Narong Stadium; Attendance: 6,390; Referee: Kittiwat Kittpaksakun; Assistant referees: Sittichai Saramai, Natthakan Thongchok; Fourth official: Kulthawat Sisanong

8 November 2023	Maejo United (N)	1–0	Ubon Kruanapat (NE)	San Sai, Chiangmai
15:00 (UTC+7)	Tatsuhide Shimizu 87'	Report		Stadium: Stadium of Maejo University; Attendance: 25; Referee: Ekkachai Juywong; Assistant referees: Khachonphong Singthana, Somlak Saefa; Fourth official: Doungkaew Doungtawan

8 November 2023	Fleet (E)	6–0	Surin Khong Chee Mool (NE)	Sattahip, Chonburi
15:00 (UTC+7)	Jakrayut Vivatvanit 2', 71', 79', 90+1'; Nitikorn Pengsawat 62'; Wanusanun Thana 67'	Report		Stadium: Battleship Stadium; Attendance: 95; Referee: Ekkachai Phetcham; Assistant referees: Narit Mungtoemklang, Adisai Pongnairat; Fourth official: Niruch Panjontuk

8 November 2023	Uttaradit Saksiam (N)	4–2	Saimit Kabin United (E)	Mueang, Uttaradit
15:00 (UTC+7)	Mammad Guliyev 40'; Basam Radwan Mahmoud Mohamed Afify 46', 69'; Kittisak Wantawee 61'	Report	Warit Chimmale 42' (o.g.); Kim Jun-hyeon 52'	Stadium: Uttaradit Provincial Stadium; Attendance: 162; Referee: Bongkod Tiansavang; Assistant referees: Samart Thongdonngao, Vithit Wilasphaingoen; Fourth official: Nattawut Pornchaiwirun

8 November 2023	Udon United (NE)	1–3	Nakhon Sawan See Khwae City (N)	Mueang, Udon Thani
15:00 (UTC+7)	João Paulo 26' (pen.)	Report	Hayato Eguchi 14'; Vinícius Silva Freitas 21'; Kongsakon Sreebunpang 85'	Stadium: Stadium of Thailand National Sports University, Udon Thani Campus; Referee: Pongdanai Sadsadee; Assistant referees: Natdanai Pongjit, Kit Khlaithong; Fourth official: Pisal Motongsri

8 November 2023	Sisaket United (NE)	1–0	Navy (E)	Mueang, Sisaket
17:00 (UTC+7)	Chatchai Boonnuk 63'	Report		Stadium: Sri Nakhon Lamduan Stadium; Attendance: 252; Referee: Nipon Kaewchanthi; Assistant referees: Ponlakrit Wangkoon, Worawut Chatipa; Fourth official: Tharanon Naowapan

8 November 2023	Bankhai United (E)	1–0	Khelang United (N)	Ban Khai, Rayong
18:00 (UTC+7)	Aphirak Suankan 10'	Report		Stadium: Wai Krong Stadium; Attendance: 106; Referee: Theerapon Nakthong; Assistant referees: Ekkalak Muangkhotr, Chaiwat Rupsa-at; Fourth official: Pornthep Promsopa

8 November 2023	Phitsanulok (N)	1–2	Mahasarakham SBT (NE)	Mueang, Phitsanulok
18:00 (UTC+7)	Caio da Conceição Silva 46'	Report	Nattapon Thaptanon 21'; Phuwadon Buranaaudom 73'	Stadium: Phitsanulok PAO. Stadium; Attendance: 615; Referee: Chitchanuphong Ketsana; Assistant referees: Jarin Champakpriew, Kosit Laochaem; Fourth official: Chalit Ploypech

Lower region
The first round would be played in the lower region featuring 5 clubs from the 2023–24 Thai League 3 Western Region, 5 clubs from the 2023–24 Thai League 3 Southern Region, and 6 clubs from the 2023–24 Thai League 3 Bangkok Metropolitan Region.

8 November 2023	Chainat United (W)	0–5	Samut Prakan (BM)	Nong Mamong, Chainat
15:00 (UTC+7)		Report	Montree Siriwattanasuwan 6' (o.g.); Kittisak Dangsakul 10'; Wongwat Joroentaveesuk 18'; Shunta Hasegawa 19'; Danai James Smart 45+2'	Stadium: Nong Mamong Stadium; Attendance: 50; Referee: Worapon Sanjan; Assistant referees: Narakorn Sapsuksai, Rangsan Kangchainguan; Fourth official: Arnon Chaphondon

8 November 2023	Prime Bangkok (BM)	2–0	Thap Luang United (W)	Bang Kapi, Bangkok
15:00 (UTC+7)	Abdulrahman Kelani A.K. Essadi 75'; Chawanwit Saelao 83'	Report		Stadium: Stadium of Ramkhamhaeng University; Attendance: 150; Referee: Nattaphak Sawasdee; Assistant referees: Watchara Wongkhan, Jasada Tongkam; Fourth official: Panuwat Weawkum

8 November 2023	Thonburi United (BM)	3–4	Phatthalung (S)	Nong Khaem, Bangkok
15:00 (UTC+7)	Piyaphong Phrueksupee 3', 45'; Chatturong Longsriphum 85'	Report	Kongpop Artserm 34', 60'; Jhonatan Bernardo 52'; Mitsada Saitaifah 72'	Stadium: Thonburi Stadium; Attendance: 100; Referee: Dassakhon Hokla; Assistant referees: Tibeth Longtree, Pichet Chumcha; Fourth official: Pornpumin Chaiyo

8 November 2023	MH Nakhon Si City (S)	1–3	North Bangkok University (BM)	Ron Phibun, Nakhon Si Thammarat
16:00 (UTC+7)	Edson dos Santos Costa Júnior 89' (pen.)	Report	Aliu Micheal Abdul 1'; Kim Seong-soo 45', 60'	Stadium: Nakhon Si Thammarat PAO. Stadium; Attendance: 160; Referee: Yod Damhai; Assistant referees: Wisarut Damthaklong, Hadis Kaesaman; Fourth official: Nirut Suetrong

8 November 2023	Lopburi City (W)	6–0	Yala (S)	Mueang, Lopburi
16:00 (UTC+7)	Monchit Wanna 30'; Christian Joseph Sacchini 38'; Thiraphong Yangdi 59'; Noppasak Nunsri 71' (o.g.); Lucas Gaudencio Moraes 80'; Ozor Enoch 87'	Report		Stadium: Phra Ramesuan Stadium; Attendance: 90; Referee: Arun Budtasee; Assistant referees: Den Bunyakittakun, Sarawut Nenrod; Fourth official: Saravut Suksalee

8 November 2023	Pattani (S)	2–0 awd.	AUU Inter Bangkok (BM)	Mueang, Pattani
16:30 (UTC+7)				Stadium: Pattani PAO. Stadium

8 November 2023	Songkhla (S)	1–0	PTU Pathum Thani (W)	Mueang, Songkhla
17:00 (UTC+7)	Somprat Inthaphut 48'	Report		Stadium: Tinsulanon Stadium; Attendance: 273; Referee: Aibroheem Sama; Assistant referees: Wathanyoo Ritchim, Fa-is Sohdalae; Fourth official: Firdaus Dueramae

8 November 2023	Samut Sakhon City (BM)	2–0	Rajpracha (W)	Mueang, Samut Sakhon
17:00 (UTC+7)	Phakhinai Nammeechai 29'; Yod Chanthawong 87'	Report		Stadium: Stadium of Thailand National Sports University, Samut Sakhon Campus; Attendance: 120; Referee: Aidsara Gaedthai; Assistant referees: Sopon Boonlest, Opas Intaviset; Fourth official: Pongtut Ananta-art

=== Second round ===
The second round would feature 16 clubs that were the winners of the first round. This round was drawn on 10 November 2023. 27 goals occurred in this round.

Upper region
The first round would be played in the upper region featuring 3 clubs from the 2023–24 Thai League 3 Northern Region, 3 clubs from the 2023–24 Thai League 3 Northeastern Region, and 2 clubs from the 2023–24 Thai League 3 Eastern Region.

22 November 2023	Maejo United (N)	2–0	Fleet (E)	Mueang, Chiangmai
15:00 (UTC+7)	Sichon Chompoorat 52'; Thongchai Oampornwiman 90+1'	Report		Stadium: Chiangmai City Municipality Stadium; Attendance: 42; Referee: Bongkod Tiansavang; Assistant referees: Teerapong Oma, Siwakorn Singthana; Fourth official: Tudsanee Khuanpet

22 November 2023	Nakhon Sawan See Khwae City (N)	2–1	Bankhai United (E)	Mueang, Nakhon Sawan
15:00 (UTC+7)	Issei Kikuchi 12'; Thanaphon Dekosta 86'	Report	Chokchai Sukthed 51'	Stadium: Stadium of Nakhon Sawan Sports School; Attendance: 70; Referee: Chalit Ploypech; Assistant referees: Samart Thongdonngao, Jonrak Sangcharern; Fourth official: Thanaporn Ouicharoen

22 November 2023	Uttaradit Saksiam (N)	4–3	Mahasarakham SBT (NE)	Mueang, Uttaradit
15:00 (UTC+7)	Mammad Guliyev 5'; Tanpisit Kukalamo 37'; Basam Radwan Mahmoud Mohamed Afify 52' (pen.); Ponlawat Pinkong 76'	Report	Phurewat Aunthong 19'; Ramon Mesquita 66' (pen.); Pakkanan Meecheu 73'	Stadium: Uttaradit Provincial Stadium; Attendance: 128; Referee: Nattawut Pornchaiwirun; Assistant referees: Suttinan Kanchana, Phichayut Noitathong; Fourth official: Tanyathon Phetch-udom

22 November 2023	Sisaket United (NE)	0–0 (a.e.t.) (7–8 p)	Surin City (NE)	Mueang, Sisaket
17:00 (UTC+7)		Report		Stadium: Sri Nakhon Lamduan Stadium; Attendance: 286; Referee: Thanapon Suwannaket; Assistant referees: Chaiyot Hapholdee, Kiadtisak Podram; Fourth official: Uthai Purase
	Penalties
	Danilo (penalty scored); Panigazzi Matías Ignacio (penalty scored); Pakornkiat Kaena (penalty scored); Nonthawat Chaotai (penalty scored); Pongsak Boonthot (penalty missed); Phattharapong Phengchaem (penalty scored); Chatchai Boonnuk (penalty scored); Piyanath Chanrum (penalty scored); Khritmat Sompen (penalty missed)		(penalty scored) Komen Sangsamanan; (penalty scored) Nitiphum Pralomram; (penalty scored) Adisorn Bunloet; (penalty missed) Jattuphon Nueakaew; (penalty scored) Watthanapon Chinthong; (penalty scored) Chatthawat Thaweewut; (penalty scored) Aphidet Sawaengsuk; (penalty scored) Kitsanaphat Kingkaeo; (penalty scored) Thanakorn Korkaew

Lower region
The first round would be played in the lower region featuring 1 club from the 2023–24 Thai League 3 Western Region, 3 clubs from the 2023–24 Thai League 3 Southern Region, and 4 clubs from the 2023–24 Thai League 3 Bangkok Metropolitan Region.

22 November 2023	Samut Prakan (BM)	3–4	Phatthalung (S)	Bang Sao Thong, Samut Prakan
15:00 (UTC+7)	Bhumchanok Kamkla 84' (pen.); Warakorn Huatwiset 90+1'; Shunta Hasegawa 90+2'	Report	Phuwanart Khamkaew 7'; Osvaldo Nascimento dos Santos Neto 13' (pen.), 36', 65'	Stadium: Samut Prakan Stadium; Attendance: 51; Referee: Poomnapat Athan; Assistant referees: Sopon Boonlest, Niracha Sangprasit; Fourth official: Supiree Testhomya

22 November 2023	Prime Bangkok (BM)	4–1	Pattani (S)	Bang Kapi, Bangkok
15:00 (UTC+7)	Alexander Philip Dominic Tkacz 45+3'; Lars William Kvist 58'; Poppol Zeemadee 78'; Chawanwit Saelao 82'	Report	Lionel Frank Touko Nzola 80'	Stadium: Stadium of Ramkhamhaeng University; Attendance: 1,100; Referee: Pongtut Ananta-art; Assistant referees: Sujin Rodart, Pichet Chumcha; Fourth official: Danai Yommool

22 November 2023	North Bangkok University (BM)	0–0 (a.e.t.) (5–6 p)	Songkhla (S)	Thanyaburi, Pathum Thani
15:00 (UTC+7)		Report		Stadium: Stadium of North Bangkok University; Attendance: 120; Referee: Aidsara Gaedthai; Assistant referees: Theerapon Nonthakhamjan, Weerawat Chantawad; Fourth official: Chokanan Tipchan
	Penalties
	Noppavit Tomyim (penalty scored); Phasagorn Promhong (penalty scored); Worrapat Sukkapan (penalty scored); Kim Seong-soo (penalty missed); Thanawat Pimyotha (penalty scored); Apirak Chinket (penalty scored); Sanan Amkoed (penalty missed); Saranyu Mangsa (penalty missed)		(penalty scored) Ekene Victor Azike; (penalty missed) Anwa A-leemama; (penalty scored) Victor Clemente de Oliveira Capinan; (penalty scored) Pornthep Heemla; (penalty scored) Noto Boontawan; (penalty scored) Basree Sanron; (penalty missed) Sanan Samala; (penalty scored) Suhaimee Roman

22 November 2023	Samut Sakhon City (BM)	0–3	Lopburi City (W)	Mueang, Samut Sakhon
17:00 (UTC+7)		Report	Teerapat Sangwong 19'; Lucas Gaudencio Moraes 32', 90+4'	Stadium: Stadium of Thailand National Sports University, Samut Sakhon Campus; Attendance: 184; Referee: Nattaphak Sawasdee; Assistant referees: Watchara Wongkhan, Pornpumin Chaiyo; Fourth official: Panuwat Weawkum

=== Quarter-finals ===
The quarter-finals would feature 8 clubs that were the winners of the second round. This round was drawn on 24 November 2023. 9 goals occurred in this round.

13 December 2023	Uttaradit Saksiam (N)	1–1 (a.e.t.) (4–2 p)	Prime Bangkok (BM)	Mueang, Uttaradit
15:00 (UTC+7)	Chayawut Putta 85'	Report; Highlight	Chawanwit Saelao 38'	Stadium: Uttaradit Provincial Stadium; Attendance: 238; Referee: Supat Chaingam; Assistant referees: Teerapong Oma, Amonthep Pangjay; Fourth official: Ekkachai Juywong
	Penalties
	Basam Radwan Mahmoud Mohamed Afify (penalty scored); Ponlawat Pinkong (penalty scored); Thanadon Sukkon (penalty scored); Anupap Onglaor (penalty missed); Chaimongkhon Rotnoi (penalty scored)		(penalty scored) Sirisak Promduang; (penalty missed) Chaithat Maneein; (penalty missed) Lars William Kvist; (penalty scored) Chawanwit Saelao

13 December 2023	Surin City (NE)	0–2	Phatthalung (S)	Mueang, Surin
15:00 (UTC+7)		Report	Jhonatan Bernardo 11'; Kongpop Artserm 81'	Stadium: Sri Narong Stadium; Attendance: 235; Referee: Rutratchapoom Moolpong; Assistant referees: Chairat Phooalai, Nipon Kaewchanthi; Fourth official: Chaiyot Hapholdee

13 December 2023	Nakhon Sawan See Khwae City (N)	1–2	Lopburi City (W)	Mueang, Nakhon Sawan
15:00 (UTC+7)	Thanaphon Dekosta 28'	Report	Lucas Gaudencio Moraes 87' (pen.), 90+4'	Stadium: Stadium of Nakhon Sawan Sports School; Attendance: 74; Referee: Chalit Ploypech; Assistant referees: Michai Changhirai, Phichayut Noitathong; Fourth official: Bongkod Tiansavang

13 December 2023	Songkhla (S)	1–1 (a.e.t.) (3–4 p)	Maejo United (N)	Mueang, Songkhla
17:00 (UTC+7)	Reon Saito 34'	Report	Thongchai Oampornwiman 47'	Stadium: Tinsulanon Stadium; Attendance: 282; Referee: Matoha Sayo; Assistant referees: Wisarut Damthaklong, Tanakorn Tala; Fourth official: Ameen Lorma
	Penalties
	Ekene Victor Azike (penalty missed); Victor Clemente de Oliveira Capinan (penalty scored); Pornthep Heemla (penalty scored); Noto Boontawan (penalty scored); Basree Sanron (penalty missed)		(penalty missed) Thongchai Oampornwiman; (penalty scored) Weerachai Takerngpol; (penalty scored) Tatsuhide Shimizu; (penalty scored) Suwijak Moonkeaw; (penalty scored) Sichon Chompoorat

=== Semi-finals ===
The semi-finals would feature 4 clubs that were the winners of the quarter-finals. This round was drawn on 21 December 2023. 13 goals occurred in this round.

Team 1	Agg.	Team 2	1st leg	2nd leg
Uttaradit Saksiam (N)	0–2	Phatthalung (S)	0–1	0–1
Lopburi City (W)	5–6	Maejo United (N)	1–3	4–3

1st leg

17 January 2024	Uttaradit Saksiam (N)	0–1	Phatthalung (S)	Mueang, Uttaradit
15:30 (UTC+7)		Report	Kongpop Artserm 71'	Stadium: Uttaradit Provincial Stadium; Attendance: 163; Referee: Chirawat Chomphoosee; Assistant referees: Suwit Kongtongnok, Phichayut Noitathong; Fourth official: Chalit Ploypech

17 January 2024	Lopburi City (W)	1–3	Maejo United (N)	Mueang, Lopburi
18:00 (UTC+7)	Kritsana Jamniankarn 49'	Report; Highlight	Nattapan Pansuchat 35'; Kongphob Kamasit 86', 90+3'	Stadium: Phra Ramesuan Stadium; Attendance: 200; Referee: Kittichai Huthip; Assistant referees: Kittichok Huthip, Patcharapon Losomsup; Fourth official: Narapat Nittayachat

2nd leg

14 February 2024	Maejo United (N)	3–4	Lopburi City (W)	Doi Saket, Chiangmai
15:30 (UTC+7)	Koki Narita 25' (pen.), 73'; Tatsuhide Shimizu 55'	Report	Peerawit Kangkun 18'; Kritsana Jamniankarn 45+4'; Debiro Dzarma Bata 70'; Christian Joseph Sacchini 90+4'	Stadium: Stadium of Rajamangala University of Technology Lanna, Doi Saket Campus; Attendance: 80; Referee: Chalit Ploypech; Assistant referees: Tudsanee Khuanpet, Chanin Cherdkamphaeng; Fourth official: Chirawat Chomphoosee

14 February 2024	Phatthalung (S)	1–0	Uttaradit Saksiam (N)	Mueang, Phatthalung
18:00 (UTC+7)	Decha Hwattaen 56'	Report		Stadium: Phatthalung PAO. Stadium; Attendance: 1,157; Referee: Nakarin Kanantai; Assistant referees: Mayunai Kueteh, Waranyu Janhor; Fourth official: Sarwan Karengsana

=== Final ===
The final would feature 2 clubs that were the winners of the semi-finals. It was played at the BG Stadium in Pathum Thani, Thailand on 3 March 2024. 1 goal occurred in this round.

3 March 2024	Phatthalung (S)	1–0 (a.e.t.)	Maejo United (N)	Thanyaburi, Pathum Thani
16:30 (UTC+7)	Jhonatan Bernardo 101'	Report; Highlight		Stadium: BG Stadium; Attendance: 1,808; Referee: Warintron Sassadee; Assistant referees: Chotrawee Tongduang, Poonsawat Samransuk; Fourth official: Wichate Tainthong

== Tournament statistics ==
=== Top goalscorers ===
Rank	Player	Club	Goals
1	(Brazil) Lucas Gaudencio Moraes	Lopburi City	6
2	(Thailand) Jakrayut Vivatvanit	Fleet	5
2	(Thailand) Chawanwit Saelao	Prime Bangkok	5
4	(Brazil) Edson dos Santos Costa Júnior	MH Nakhon Si City	4
4	(Thailand) Kongpop Artserm	Phatthalung	4
6	(Ghana) Sarfo Otis Adjei	AUU Inter Bangkok	3
6	(Brazil) Jhonatan Bernardo	Phatthalung	3
6	(Brazil) Osvaldo Nascimento dos Santos Neto	Phatthalung	3
6	(Egypt) Basam Radwan Mahmoud Mohamed Afify	Uttaradit Saksiam	3

=== Hat-tricks ===
Player	For	Against	Result	Date	Round
(Ghana) Sarfo Otis Adjei	AUU Inter Bangkok (BM)	The iCON RSU (BM)	3–0 (H)	18 October 2023	Second qualification round
(Brazil) Edson dos Santos Costa Júnior	MH Nakhon Si City (S)	Satun (S)	3–1 (H)	19 October 2023	Second qualification round
(Thailand) Jakrayut Vivatvanit^{4}	Fleet (E)	Surin Khong Chee Mool (NE)	6–0 (H)	8 November 2023	First round
(Brazil) Osvaldo Nascimento dos Santos Neto	Phatthalung (S)	Samut Prakan (BM)	4–3 (A)	22 November 2023	Second round

Notes: ^{4} = Player scored 4 goals; (H) = Home team; (A) = Away team

== See also ==
- 2023–24 Thai League 1
- 2023–24 Thai League 2
- 2023–24 Thai League 3
- 2023–24 Thai League 3 Northern Region
- 2023–24 Thai League 3 Northeastern Region
- 2023–24 Thai League 3 Eastern Region
- 2023–24 Thai League 3 Western Region
- 2023–24 Thai League 3 Southern Region
- 2023–24 Thai League 3 Bangkok Metropolitan Region
- 2023–24 Thai League 3 National Championship
- 2023–24 Thai FA Cup
- 2023–24 Thai League Cup
- 2023 Thailand Champions Cup
