= 2023–24 Thai League 3 Western Region =

Thai League 3 Western Region
- Season: 2023–24
- Dates: 16 September 2023 – 25 February 2024
- Champions: PTU Pathum Thani
- Relegated: Chainat United
- T3 National Championship: PTU Pathum Thani; Angthong
- Matches: 110
- Goals: 352 (3.2 per match)
- Top goalscorer: (Ghana) Eric Kumi (17 goals; PTU Pathum Thani)
- Best goalkeeper: (Thailand) Atthapon Rutham (9 clean sheets; Angthong) (Thailand) Thanatorn Kuchana (9 clean sheets; Kanchanaburi City) (Thailand) Rattanachat Niamthaisong (9 clean sheets; Rajpracha (5), Saraburi United (4))
- Biggest home win: 10 goals difference Saraburi United 10–0 Chainat United (4 November 2023)
- Biggest away win: 14 goals difference Chainat United 0–14 Maraleina (18 November 2023)
- Highest scoring: 14 goals Chainat United 0–14 Maraleina (18 November 2023)
- Longest winning run: 5 matches PTU Pathum Thani
- Longest unbeaten run: 15 matches Rajpracha; Kanchanaburi City
- Longest winless run: 20 matches Chainat United
- Longest losing run: 20 matches Chainat United

The 2023–24 Thai League 3 Western region is a region in the regional stage of the 2023–24 Thai League 3. The tournament was sponsored by Rising Sun fertilizer, and known as the Rising Sun Fertilizer League for sponsorship purposes. A total of 11 teams located in Western, Central, and Bangkok metropolitan region of Thailand will compete in the league of the Western region.

== Changes from last season ==
=== Promotion or relegation ===
Team	League		Notes
Team	Previous season	Current season	Notes
From Thai League 3
Dragon Pathumwan Kanchanaburi (substituted on)	Thai League 3	Thai League 2	
Thawi Watthana Samut Sakhon United (substituted off)	Thai League 3	Thailand Semi-pro League	
Samut Songkhram (substituted off)	Thai League 3	Thailand Semi-pro League	Relegation due to club licensing reason
To Thai League 3
Rajpracha (substituted off)	Thai League 2	Thai League 3	
Thap Luang United (substituted on)	Thailand Semi-pro League	Thai League 3	

=== Renaming ===
Team	Old name	Current name
Maraleina	Kanjanapat F.C.	Maraleina F.C.
PTU Pathum Thani	Pathumthani University F.C.	PTU Pathum Thani F.C.

== Teams ==
=== Number of teams by province ===
Position	Province	Number	Teams
1	Ang Thong	1	Angthong
1	Bangkok	1	Assumption United
1	Chai Nat	1	Chainat United
1	Kanchanaburi	1	Kanchanaburi City
1	Lopburi	1	Lopburi City
1	Nakhon Pathom	1	Thap Luang United
1	Nonthaburi	1	Rajpracha
1	Pathum Thani	1	Maraleina
1	Phra Nakhon Si Ayutthaya	1	PTU Pathum Thani
1	Prachuap Khiri Khan	1	Hua Hin City
1	Saraburi	1	Saraburi United

=== Stadiums and locations ===
Locations of the 2023–24 Thai League 3 Western region teams

Team	Location	Stadium	Coordinates
Angthong	Angthong (Mueang)	Angthong Provincial Stadium	14°37′45″N 100°27′07″E
Assumption United	Bangkok (Bang Khae)	Wong Prachanukul Stadium	13°44′03″N 100°22′14″E
Chainat United	Chainat (Nong Mamong)	Nong Mamong Stadium	15°16′26″N 99°52′05″E
Hua Hin City	Prachuap Khiri Khan (Hua Hin)	Hua Hin Town Municipality Stadium	12°31′37″N 99°58′10″E
Kanchanaburi City	Kanchanaburi (Tha Muang)	Khao Noi SAO. Stadium	13°57′48″N 99°35′35″E
Lopburi City	Lopburi (Mueang)	Phra Ramesuan Stadium	14°48′04″N 100°38′52″E
Maraleina	Pathum Thani (Khlong Luang)	Stadium of Valaya Alongkorn Rajabhat University under the Royal Patronage	14°08′00″N 100°36′25″E
PTU Pathum Thani	Ayutthaya (Bang Sai)	Ratchakram Stadium	14°10′09″N 100°31′45″E
Rajpracha	Nonthaburi (Bang Yai)	Nonthaburi Stadium	13°51′03″N 100°26′28″E
Saraburi United	Saraburi (Mueang)	Saraburi Stadium	14°33′24″N 100°54′18″E
Thap Luang United	Nakhon Pathom (Kamphaeng Saen)	Stadium of Kasetsart University, Kamphaeng Saen Campus	14°01′55″N 99°59′22″E

Locations of teams in Bangkok Metropolitan region

=== Foreign players ===
A T3 team could register 3 foreign players from foreign players all around the world. A team can use 3 foreign players on the field in each game.

Note :
(substituted off) : players who released during second leg transfer window;
(substituted on) : players who registered during second leg transfer window.

AFC member countries players.
CAF member countries players.
CONCACAF member countries players.
CONMEBOL member countries players.
OFC member countries players.
UEFA member countries players.
No foreign player registered.

Club	Leg	Player 1	Player 2	Player 3
Angthong	1st	(Republic of the Congo) Burnel Okana-Stazi (substituted off)	(Ivory Coast) Kouassi Yao Hermann	(Japan) Ryo Tomigahara
Angthong	2nd	(England) Karam Idris (substituted on)	(Ivory Coast) Kouassi Yao Hermann	(Japan) Ryo Tomigahara
Assumption United	1st	(South Korea) Heo Seung-min (substituted off)	(South Korea) Lee Ho-been (substituted off)
Assumption United	2nd
Chainat United	1st	(Nigeria) Pascal Ifeanyi Eke (substituted off)	(Guinea) Sékou Nana Sylla
Chainat United	2nd	(Nigeria) Oibo Okhai Godspower (substituted on)	(Guinea) Sékou Nana Sylla
Hua Hin City	1st
Hua Hin City	2nd	(Brazil) Breno Souza Dias (substituted on)	(Ivory Coast) Abdel Razak Diomande (substituted on)	(Uganda) Ambrose Awio (substituted on)
Kanchanaburi City	1st	(Cameroon) Mardochée Kaham Seuntcha	(Ivory Coast) Oumar Sanou
Kanchanaburi City	2nd	(Cameroon) Mardochée Kaham Seuntcha	(Ivory Coast) Oumar Sanou
Lopburi City	1st	(Ghana) Ozor Enoch (substituted off)	(Brazil) Lucas Gaudencio Moraes	(United States) Christian Joseph Sacchini
Lopburi City	2nd	(Nigeria) Debiro Dzarma Bata (substituted on)	(Brazil) Lucas Gaudencio Moraes	(United States) Christian Joseph Sacchini
Maraleina	1st		(Cameroon) Éric Gaël Mouangue (substituted off)	(Ivory Coast) Diarra Junior Aboubacar (substituted off)
Maraleina	2nd	(Senegal) Tall Mouhamadou Fallou Mbacke (substituted on)	(Cameroon) Ahmadou Tidjani (substituted on)	(Liberia) Leon Sullivan Taylor (substituted on)
PTU Pathum Thani	1st	(South Korea) Ma Ye-sung (substituted off)	(Ghana) Eric Kumi	(Iran) Ali Jafarian
PTU Pathum Thani	2nd	(Brazil) Caíque Freitas Ribeiro (substituted on)	(Ghana) Eric Kumi	(Iran) Ali Jafarian
Rajpracha	1st	(Serbia) Marko Milenkovic	(United States) Samuel Erik Strong	(Japan) Sosuke Kimura
Rajpracha	2nd	(Serbia) Marko Milenkovic	(United States) Samuel Erik Strong	(Japan) Sosuke Kimura
Saraburi United	1st	(Brazil) Haraan Hajazan Gonçalves Barbosa (substituted off)	(Brazil) Júlio Cesar Gomes Romaneli (substituted off)	(Ivory Coast) Henri Jöel
Saraburi United	2nd	(Brazil) Edson dos Santos Costa Júnior (substituted on)	(Azerbaijan) Mammad Guliyev (substituted on)	(Ivory Coast) Henri Jöel
Thap Luang United	1st	(Japan) Kenta Aso (substituted off)	(South Korea) Lee Gi-been (substituted off)	(Laos) Phoutthasay Khochalern
Thap Luang United	2nd		(Ghana) Samuel Abega Ampofo (substituted on)	(Laos) Phoutthasay Khochalern

== League table ==
=== Standings ===
Pos	Team	Pld	W	D	L	GF	GA	GD	Pts	Qualification or relegation
1	PTU Pathum Thani (C, Q)	20	12	6	2	51	16	+35	42	Qualification to the National Championship stage
2	Angthong (Q)	20	12	4	4	42	20	+22	40 (Note: Angthong ahead on head-to-head points record; Angthong 4 pts, Rajpracha 1 pt.)	Qualification to the National Championship stage
3	Rajpracha	20	11	7	2	41	15	+26	40	
4	Saraburi United	20	11	3	6	39	22	+17	36	
5	Lopburi City	20	10	4	6	35	16	+19	34	
6	Kanchanaburi City	20	8	8	4	31	17	+14	32	
7	Maraleina	20	6	9	5	40	20	+20	27	
8	Thap Luang United	20	6	4	10	20	27	−7	22	
9	Assumption United	20	5	4	11	24	35	−11	19	
10	Hua Hin City	20	4	1	15	24	38	−14	13	
11	Chainat United (R)	20	0	0	20	5	126	−121	0	Relegation to the Thailand Semi-pro League

Source: Thai League
Rules for classification: 1) Points; 2) Head-to-head points; 3) Head-to-head goal difference; 4) Head-to-head goal scored; 5) Overall goal difference; 6) Overall goal scored; 7) Fair play points; 8) Play-off without extra time).
(C) Champions; (Q) Qualified for the phase indicated; (R) Relegated

=== Positions by round ===
Team ╲ Round	1	2	3	4	5	6	7	8	9	10	11	12	13	14	15	16	17	18	19	20	21	22
PTU Pathum Thani	4	3	1	3	3	4	3	4	3	4	1	1	1	2	2	2	5	2	2	2	2	1
Angthong	1	6	6	4	1	1	2	3	2	2	2	2	2	1	1	1	1	1	1	1	1	2
Rajpracha	8	9	9	8	8	10	8	6	5	3	4	4	4	3	3	4	2	5	3	3	3	3
Saraburi United	3	2	2	1	2	3	4	2	1	1	5	5	5	5	4	6	6	3	4	4	4	4
Lopburi City	11	7	4	5	5	2	1	1	4	5	3	3	3	4	6	5	3	6	6	6	6	5
Kanchanaburi City	10	10	10	10	9	7	6	5	6	7	7	7	6	6	5	3	4	4	5	5	5	6
Maraleina	6	8	8	9	7	5	5	7	7	6	6	6	7	7	7	7	7	7	7	7	7	7
Thap Luang United	9	4	7	7	10	9	9	9	9	9	10	10	10	10	10	9	9	8	8	8	8	8
Assumption United	5	1	5	2	4	6	7	8	8	8	8	8	9	8	8	8	8	9	9	9	9	9
Hua Hin City	2	5	3	6	6	8	10	10	10	10	9	9	8	9	9	10	10	10	10	10	10	10
Chainat United	7	11	11	11	11	11	11	11	11	11	11	11	11	11	11	11	11	11	11	11	11	11

Source: Thai League
= Qualification to the National Championship stage; = Relegation to the Thailand Semi-pro League

=== Results by round ===
Team ╲ Round	1	2	3	4	5	6	7	8	9	10	11	12	13	14	15	16	17	18	19	20	21	22
PTU Pathum Thani	W	D	W	D	D	N	W	D	W	D	W	D	W	L	W	N	L	W	W	W	W	W
Angthong	W	L	D	W	W	W	L	N	W	D	D	W	W	W	L	D	W	N	W	W	W	L
Rajpracha	L	D	N	D	W	L	W	W	W	W	D	D	N	W	W	D	W	D	W	W	D	W
Saraburi United	W	D	W	W	L	L	D	W	W	N	L	D	L	W	W	L	W	W	W	N	W	L
Lopburi City	L	W	W	D	D	W	W	D	N	L	W	W	L	L	L	W	W	D	N	L	W	W
Kanchanaburi City	L	N	L	D	W	W	D	W	D	D	D	N	W	W	W	W	D	W	D	L	D	L
Maraleina	D	D	L	N	W	W	D	D	D	W	D	D	L	N	W	W	L	D	D	W	L	L
Thap Luang United	L	W	L	L	L	W	D	L	L	D	N	L	W	L	L	W	D	D	L	W	N	W
Assumption United	D	W	D	W	N	L	L	D	L	D	L	W	L	W	N	L	L	L	L	L	L	W
Hua Hin City	W	L	W	L	L	L	N	L	L	D	W	L	W	L	L	L	N	L	L	L	L	L
Chainat United	N	L	L	L	L	L	L	L	L	L	L	L	L	L	L	L	L	L	L	L	L	N

Source: Thai League
N = No match; W = Won; D = Drawn; L = Lost

=== Results ===
Home \ Away	ATG	ASU	CNU	HHC	KCC	LBC	MLN	PTU	RCA	SRU	TLU
Angthong	—	3–0	8–0	2–0	3–1	2–3	1–1	2–1	3–0	0–1	1–4
Assumption United	2–2	—	3–1	2–1	0–2	0–3	1–0	2–2	1–2	2–3	0–1
Chainat United	0–3	0–4	—	1–3	0–6	0–5	0–14	1–9	0–11	0–7	1–5
Hua Hin City	2–3	1–3	6–1	—	1–3	0–1	0–2	2–2	0–2	2–0	0–1
Kanchanaburi City	0–0	4–1	1–0	2–0	—	2–2	2–2	0–1	1–1	3–0	2–2
Lopburi City	0–2	2–1	7–0	3–1	0–1	—	0–0	1–1	0–1	2–0	2–0
Maraleina	0–1	1–1	8–0	2–1	1–1	1–1	—	1–3	1–1	1–1	3–0
PTU Pathum Thani	2–0	4–0	9–0	3–0	2–0	1–0	2–1	—	0–0	2–2	2–1
Rajpracha	2–2	2–1	6–0	2–1	0–0	1–0	0–0	2–1	—	4–1	1–1
Saraburi United	0–1	1–0	10–0	2–1	1–0	0–2	4–0	1–1	2–1	—	2–0
Thap Luang United	1–3	0–0	1–0	1–2	0–0	2–1	0–1	0–3	0–2	0–1	—

Source: Thai League
Legend: Blue = home team win; Yellow = draw; Red = away team win.
For upcoming matches, an "a" indicates there is an article about the rivalry between the two participants.

Note: In matchday 1 on 17 September 2023, Lopburi City forfeited and awarded a 2–0 score to Angthong due to a power failure.

== Season statistics ==
=== Top scorers ===
As of 24 February 2024.

Rank	Player	Club	Goals
1	(Ghana) Eric Kumi	PTU Pathum Thani	17
2	(England) Karam Idris	Angthong (12 Goals)	12
3	(Thailand) Chitsanuphong Phimpsang	Maraleina (11 Goals)	11
4	(Ivory Coast) Kouassi Yao Hermann	Angthong	8
4	(Nigeria) Dzarma Bata	Lopburi City (8 Goals)	8
4	(Thailand) Narongrit Kamnet	Saraburi United (6 Goals); PTU Pathum Thani (2 Goals)	8
4	(Japan) Sosuke Kimura	Rajpracha	8

=== Hat-tricks ===
Player	For	Against	Result	Date
(Thailand) Narongrit Kamnet^{5}	Saraburi United	Chainat United	10–0 (H)	5 November 2023
(Thailand) Chitsanuphong Phimpsang^{7}	Maraleina	Chainat United	0–14 (A)	18 November 2023
(Thailand) Yannatat Wannatong	Kanchanaburi City	Saraburi United	3–0 (H)	23 December 2023
(Thailand) Phuwanet Thongkhui	Thap Luang United	Chainat United	1–5 (A)	21 January 2024
(Nigeria) Dzarma Bata	Lopburi City	Chainat United	7–0 (H)	27 January 2024
(Brazil) Edson dos Santos Costa Júnior^{4}	Saraburi United	Chainat United	0–7 (A)	3 February 2024
(Japan) Sosuke Kimura^{4}	Rajpracha	Chainat United	0–11 (A)	7 February 2024
(Liberia) Leon Sullivan Taylor	Maraleina	Chainat United	8–0 (H)	10 February 2024
(England) Karam Idris	Angthong	Kanchanaburi City	3–1 (H)	11 February 2024
(Ghana) Eric Kumi^{5}	PTU Pathum Thani	Chainat United	1–9 (A)	18 February 2024

Notes: ^{5} = Player scored 5 goals; ^{4} = Player scored 4 goals; (H) = Home team; (A) = Away team

=== Clean sheets ===
As of 24 February 2024.

Rank	Player	Club	Clean sheets
1	(Thailand) Atthapon Rutham	Angthong	9
1	(Thailand) Thanatorn Kuchana	Kanchanaburi City	9
1	(Thailand) Rattanachat Niamthaisong	Rajpracha (5), Saraburi United (4)	9
4	(Thailand) Kititad Khamkaew	PTU Pathum Thani	8
5	(Thailand) Siraset Aekprathumchai	Lopburi City	7

== Attendances ==
=== Overall statistical table ===
Pos	Team	Total	High	Low	Average	Change
1	Angthong	6,361	1,459	352	636	+147.5%
2	Saraburi United	5,885	1,004	326	589	+101.0%
3	Thap Luang United	2,669	375	100	267	n/a
4	Lopburi City	2,348	550	0	261	+45.8%
5	Assumption United	1,945	400	85	195	−9.7%
6	Hua Hin City	1,843	300	89	184	−36.3%
7	Maraleina	1,485	611	0	165	+41.0%
8	Rajpracha	1,436	217	94	144	−46.5%
9	Kanchanaburi City	1,416	225	70	142	−75.7%
10	PTU Pathum Thani	1,423	242	40	142	+20.3%
11	Chainat United	1,006	200	0	112	+55.6%
	League total	27,817	1,459	0	260	+9.2%

Updated to games played on 25 February 2024
Source: Thai League

=== Attendances by home match played ===
Team \ Match played	1	2	3	4	5	6	7	8	9	10	Total
Angthong	590	352	539	568	535	489	570	569	690	1,459	6,361
Assumption United	222	215	235	400	101	225	112	220	85	130	1,945
Chainat United	120	60	96	30	100	100	200	200	Unk.2	100	1,006
Hua Hin City	250	300	112	150	300	200	120	200	89	122	1,843
Kanchanaburi City	215	128	99	225	209	110	100	140	70	120	1,416
Lopburi City	Can.1	550	320	200	200	220	203	300	155	200	2,348
Maraleina	78	93	124	157	84	103	Unk.1	611	66	169	1,485
PTU Pathum Thani	110	230	110	242	40	100	85	165	120	221	1,423
Rajpracha	109	124	120	98	94	167	178	158	171	217	1,436
Saraburi United	550	924	1,004	941	423	544	400	345	326	428	5,885
Thap Luang United	100	320	180	215	272	345	375	320	297	245	2,669

Note:
Can.1 Canceled of T3 official match 17 September 2023 (Lopburi City 0–2 Angthong).
Unk.1 Some error of T3 official match report 20 January 2024 (Maraleina 2–1 Hua Hin City)
Unk.2 Some error of T3 official match report 7 February 2024 (Chainat United 0–11 Rajpracha)
