= Thap Luang United F.C. =

Football club in Kamphaeng Saen, Thailand

Thap Luang United ทัพหลวง ยูไนเต็ด
- Full name: Thap Luang United Football Club
- Nicknames: The musth elephants (ช้างตกมัน)
- Founded: 2021; 5 years ago
- Ground: Stadium of Kasetsart University, Kamphaeng Saen Campus; Nakhon Pathom, Thailand
- Capacity: 5,000
- Coordinates: 14°01′55″N 99°59′22″E
- Owner(s): Thapluang United Co., Ltd.
- Chairman: Chanakij Phuang-in
- Head coach: Chanakij Phuang-in
- League: Thai League 3
- 2025–26: Thai League 3, 4th of 11 in the Western region
- Website: https://web.facebook.com/profile.php?id=100066319549139

Thap Luang United Football Club (Thai สโมสรฟุตบอล ทัพหลวง ยูไนเต็ด), is a Thai football club based in Kamphaeng Saen, Nakhon Pathom, Thailand. The club is currently playing in the Thai League 3 Western region.

== History ==
In 2021, the club was established with the name Thap Luang United by Mr.Chanakit Phuang-in President of the football training center Tui Nui Academy want to extend the youth in the training center to find experience in the competition following the club situation, and send the team to compete for the first time in Thailand Amateur League for the 2021 season, but the match in the list was canceled by FA Thailand due to COVID-19 pandemic in Thailand.

In 2022, the club competed in Thailand Amateur League Western region and finished in 2nd place.

In early 2023, the club competed in Thailand Semi-Pro League Western region finished in 1st place of the region, promoted to the Thai League 3.

== Stadium and locations ==
| Coordinates | Location | Stadium | Year |
|---|---|---|---|
| 14°01′55″N 99°59′22″E | Kamphaeng Saen, Nakhon Pathom | Stadium of Kasetsart University, Kamphaeng Saen Campus | 2023 – present |

== Season by season record ==
| Season | League | | | | | | | | | FA Cup | League Cup | T3 Cup | Top goalscorer | |
| Season | Division | P | W | D | L | F | A | Pts | Pos | FA Cup | League Cup | T3 Cup | Name | Goals |
|---|---|---|---|---|---|---|---|---|---|---|---|---|---|---|
| 2022 | TA West | 2 | 1 | 0 | 1 | 5 | 3 | 3 | 2nd | Opted out | Ineligible | | (Thailand) Nares Ritphitakwong | 2 |
| 2023 | TS West | 8 | 5 | 3 | 0 | 13 | 7 | 18 | 1st | R2 | Ineligible | | (Thailand) Anurut Jamjang, (Thailand) Thanaphum Khenda | 3 |
| 2023–24 | T3 West | 20 | 6 | 4 | 10 | 20 | 27 | 22 | 8th | QR | QR1 | R1 | (Thailand) Phuwanet Thongkhui | 8 |
| 2024–25 | T3 West | 22 | 11 | 7 | 4 | 45 | 22 | 40 | 4th | QR | QR1 | R16 | (Thailand) Phuwanet Thongkhui | 19 |
| 2025–26 | T3 West | 20 | 8 | 7 | 5 | 22 | 17 | 31 | 4th | QR | QF | LP | (Japan) Tomohiro Kajiyama | 5 |

| Champions | Runners-up | Promoted | Relegated |

- P = Played
- W = Games won
- D = Games drawn
- L = Games lost
- F = Goals for
- A = Goals against
- Pts = Points
- Pos = Final position
- QR1 = First Qualifying Round
- QR2 = Second Qualifying Round
- R1 = Round 1
- R2 = Round 2
- R3 = Round 3
- R4 = Round 4
- R5 = Round 5
- R6 = Round 6
- QF = Quarter-finals
- SF = Semi-finals
- RU = Runners-up
- W = Winners

== Players ==
=== Current squad ===
As of 30 September 2024

Note: Flags indicate national team as defined under FIFA eligibility rules; some limited exceptions apply. Players may hold more than one non-FIFA nationality.

| No. | Pos. | Nation | Player |
|---|---|---|---|
| 1 | GK | THA | Nattapon Meesaeng |
| 2 | MF | THA | Supat Sukaiam |
| 5 | MF | THA | Sitthichai Seangjun |
| 6 | MF | THA | Krissana Nontharak |
| 7 | FW | NGA | Raoul Uche Nduka |
| 8 | MF | THA | Apinat Suksanguan |
| 9 | FW | NGA | Njika Valentine |
| 10 | FW | THA | Phuwanet Thongkhui |
| 11 | MF | THA | Panutach Rungjang |
| 14 | DF | THA | Natdanai Hangnalen |
| 18 | DF | THA | Raungchai Choothongchai |
| 19 | MF | THA | Suraphod Pankhruea |
| 20 | DF | THA | Akaporn Aaj-Konghan |
| 22 | MF | THA | Narongrit Kaeomani |
| 23 | DF | THA | Panthap Pimsiri |

| No. | Pos. | Nation | Player |
|---|---|---|---|
| 25 | FW | THA | Poonyawee Sri-on |
| 26 | FW | THA | Siwa Pikulhom |
| 28 | FW | LAO | Phoutthasay Khochalern |
| 29 | GK | THA | Sutthiphat Moikhamsin |
| 30 | MF | THA | Patcharaphon Tanpan |
| 31 | DF | THA | Thirawat Khoonsom |
| 32 | FW | THA | Kittiwut Bouloy |
| 43 | DF | THA | Thanthor Samanmit |
| 47 | FW | THA | Achirawat Sawanghazub |
| 55 | DF | THA | Phanuwat Phioon |
| 56 | GK | THA | Anuphong Kanyalang |
| 59 | GK | THA | Nawaphon Onsaart |
| 66 | FW | THA | Phayuphon Waphithak |
| 80 | MF | THA | Tuptiwat Phueakthet |
| 88 | DF | THA | Nutchanon Soijit |

== Coaching staff ==
| Position | Name |
|---|---|
| Chairman/Head coach | (Thailand) Chanakij Phuang-in |
