= Samut Sakhon City F.C. =

Thai football club

Samut Sakhon City สมุทรสาคร ซิตี้
- Full name: Samut Sakhon City Football Club สโมสรฟุตบอลสมุทรสาคร ซิตี้
- Nickname: Sakhon Tigers (พยัคฆ์สาคร)
- Short name: SSCFC
- Founded: 2022; 4 years ago
- Ground: Bangkokthonburi University Stadium
- Capacity: 1,000
- Owner(s): Samut Sakhon City Co., Ltd.
- Chairman: Wichai Thirapramot
- Head Coach: Kissakorn Krasaingoen
- League: Thai League 3
- 2025–26: Thai League 3, 1st of 11 in the Western region
| Home colours | Away colours |

Samut Sakhon City Football Club (Thai: สโมสรฟุตบอลสมุทรสาคร ซิตี้) is a Thai professional football club based in Samut Sakhon province, Founded in 2022, the club competes in Thai League 3.

== History ==
In 2022, Samut Sakhon City competed in the Thai League 3 for the 2022–23 season. It is their 1st season in the professional league. The club started the season with a 3–1 away win over Thonburi United and they ended the season with a 2–1 home win over Thonburi United. The club has finished 3rd place in the league of the Bangkok metropolitan region. In addition, in the 2022–23 Thai FA Cup Samut Sakhon City was defeated 3–5 by Phitsanulok in the second round, causing them to be eliminated and in the 2022–23 Thai League Cup Samut Sakhon City was penalty shoot-out defeated 2–3 by Kasem Bundit University in the first qualification round, causing them to be eliminated too.

== Season by season record ==
| Season | League | | | | | | | | | FA Cup | League Cup | T3 Cup | Top goalscorer | |
| Season | Division | P | W | D | L | F | A | Pts | Pos | FA Cup | League Cup | T3 Cup | Name | Goals |
Samut Sakhon City F.C.
| 2022 | TA Bangkok | 2 | 1 | 1 | 0 | 15 | 3 | 4 | 1st | Opted out | Ineligible | | | |
| 2022–23 | T3 Bangkok | 26 | 17 | 2 | 7 | 48 | 35 | 53 | 3rd | R2 | QR1 | | (Ivory Coast) Bireme Diouf | 19 |
| 2023–24 | T3 Bangkok | 26 | 17 | 5 | 4 | 65 | 21 | 56 | 3rd | SF | R1 | R2 | (Brazil) Wellington Adão | 13 |
| 2024–25 | T3 West | 22 | 16 | 3 | 3 | 49 | 19 | 51 | 1st | R3 | R1 | SF | (Brazil) Filipe Vasconcelos Paim | 15 |
| 2025–26 | T3 West | 20 | 14 | 3 | 3 | 42 | 18 | 45 | 1st | R1 | R1 | SF | (Brazil) Diogo Pereira | 20 |

| Champion | Runner | Promoted | Relegated |

== Players ==
=== First-team squad ===
As of 30 September 2026

Note: Flags indicate national team as defined under FIFA eligibility rules; some limited exceptions apply. Players may hold more than one non-FIFA nationality.

| No. | Pos. | Nation | Player |
|---|---|---|---|
| 2 | DF | THA | Kovit Noyyam |
| 4 | MF | THA | Teerawat Wongsa |
| 7 | DF | THA | Suwat Yade |
| 8 | FW | THA | Poppol Zeemadee |
| 9 | FW | MAR | Anass Zitout |
| 10 | FW | THA | Phuwanet Thongkui |
| 12 | DF | THA | Natthanon Charoensingkeewan |
| 14 | MF | THA | Arnon Prasongporn |
| 15 | DF | THA | Pradhit Ausomboom |
| 16 | DF | THA | Raphiphat Phomphrom |
| 18 | FW | THA | Alongkorn Nuekmai |
| 19 | MF | THA | Cholsatien Poolworaluk |
| 20 | DF | KOR | Jae-kyung Park |

| No. | Pos. | Nation | Player |
|---|---|---|---|
| 24 | DF | THA | Sila Srikampang |
| 27 | FW | THA | Pakornpat Phasook |
| 28 | DF | THA | Prat Samakrat |
| 29 | GK | THA | Kannawad Kanjarad |
| 32 | MF | THA | Ratchapol Nawanno |
| 34 | DF | THA | Pitipol Prachayamongkol |
| 37 | DF | THA | Aekkaphon Fangnongdu |
| 39 | GK | THA | Nopparat Seenareang |
| 40 | FW | JPN | Yuto Yoshijima |
| 41 | MF | THA | Jeerapat Putthapan |
| 62 | MF | THA | Nitirach Mahaseana |
| 77 | MF | THA | Chaiyut Srirat |
| 99 | MF | THA | Weerasak Gayasit |

== Club staff ==
| Position | Name |
|---|---|
| Team Manager | (Thailand) Wichai Thirapramot |
| Head Coach | (Thailand) Kissakorn Krasaingoen |
| Assistant Coach | (France) Mamadou Fofana (Thailand) Narathon Kongsomboon (Thailand) Rungroj Thongthinphu (Thailand) Worawet Phuprapai |
| Goalkeeper Coach | (Cameroon) Eric Nfonsam |
| Doctor | (Thailand) Piyasak Chamnarngam |

== Honours ==
=== Domestic leagues ===
- Thai League 3 Western Region
  - Winners (2): 2024–25, 2025–26
- Thailand Amateur League (Bangkok Metropolitan Region)
  - Champions (1): 2022
