= Hua Hin City F.C. =

Thai football club

Hua Hin City หัวหิน ซิตี้
- Full name: Hua Hin City Football Club สโมสรฟุตบอลหัวหินซิตี้
- Nicknames: The Sailors (เรือใบสีขาว)
- Founded: 2007; 19 years ago (as Hua Hin Municipality); 2011; 15 years ago (as Hua Hin City)
- Ground: Khao Takiap Stadium; Prachuap Khiri Khan, Thailand
- Capacity: 3,500
- Chairman: None
- Head Coach: Jiradech Seangsanga
- League: Thai League 3
- 2025–26: Thai League 3, 9th of 11 in the Western region
Home colours	Away colours	Third colours

Hua Hin City Football Club (Thai: สโมสรฟุตบอล หัวหินซิตี้) is a Thai professional football club based in Prachuap Khiri Khan Province. The club was founded in 2011. The club is currently playing in the Thai League 3 Western region.

== History ==
In 2022, Hua Hin City competed in the Thai League 3 for the 2022–23 season. It is their 10th season in the professional league. The club started the season with a 1–4 away defeat to Samut Songkhram and they ended the season with a 1–2 home defeat to Samut Songkhram. The club has finished 3rd place in the league of the Western region. In addition, in the 2022–23 Thai League Cup Hua Hin City was defeated 2–3 by Lopburi City in the first qualification round, causing them to be eliminated.

== Stadium and locations ==
Coordinates	Location	Stadium	Year
12°25′08″N 99°52′58″E	Prachuap Khiri Khan	Thanaratchata Camp Football Field	2013–2015
12°31′37″N 99°58′09″E	Prachuap Khiri Khan	Hua Hin Municipal Stadium	2016–2018

== Season-by-season record ==
Season	League									FA Cup	League Cup	T3 Cup	Top goalscorer	
Season	Division	P	W	D	L	F	A	Pts	Pos	FA Cup	League Cup	T3 Cup	Name	Goals
2011	Khǒr Royal Cup (ถ้วย ข.)													
2012	Khǒr Royal Cup (ถ้วย ข.)													
2013	DIV 2 Central & West	24	6	14	4	28	24	32	9th	Opted out	R1		(Thailand) Anucha Chaiwong	7
2014	DIV 2 Central & West	26	15	6	5	45	19	51	1st	Opted out	QR1		(Thailand) Anucha Chaiwong	10
2015	DIV 2 Central & West	24	12	6	6	38	22	42	5th	R2	R1		(Brazil) (Italy) Andre Marques	15
2016	DIV 2 West	22	6	8	8	19	23	26	8th	Opted out	Opted out			
2017	T4 West	27	9	2	16	35	40	29	7th	Opted out	Opted out		(Thailand) Arnon Kaimook	8
2018	T4 West	24	12	3	9	37	35	39	3rd	Opted out	QFP		(Thailand) Arnon Kaimook	9
2019	T4 West	24	17	2	5	52	16	53	1st	Opted out	QR1		(Thailand) Sutin Iamsa-ard	11
2020–21	T3 West	17	4	5	8	16	27	17	9th	Opted out	Opted out		(Thailand) Arnon Kaimook	5
2021–22	T3 West	20	10	3	7	31	19	33	3rd	Opted out	QR2		(Thailand) Arnon Kaimook	8
2022–23	T3 West	22	13	2	7	47	28	41	3rd	Opted out	QR1		(Thailand) Chitsanuphong Phimpsang	16
2023–24	T3 West	20	4	1	15	24	38	13	10th	Opted out	QR1	QR2	(Thailand) Chatchai Phithanmet	6
2024–25	T3 West	22	7	5	10	41	52	26	7th	Opted out	QR2	LP	(Brazil) Breno	10
2025–26	T3 West	20	5	6	9	21	30	21	9th	Opted out	QR2	LP	(South Korea) Choi Min-hyeok	5

- The club withdrew after 4 games in 2016
- The FA of Thailand Regional League authorities initially banned the club for 2 years and relegated them to play in Division 3 West zone starting in the 2018 season
- However the club returned to play in Regional League Division 2 Western region in 2016 after the two parties were able to settle the issue.

Champions	Runners-up	Promoted	Relegated

- P = Played
- W = Games won
- D = Games drawn
- L = Games lost
- F = Goals for
- A = Goals against
- Pts = Points
- Pos = Final position
- QR1 = First Qualifying Round
- QR2 = Second Qualifying Round
- R1 = Round 1
- R2 = Round 2
- R3 = Round 3
- R4 = Round 4
- R5 = Round 5
- R6 = Round 6
- QF = Quarter-finals
- SF = Semi-finals
- RU = Runners-up
- W = Winners

== Players ==
=== Current squad ===
As of 25 September 2026

Note: Flags indicate national team as defined under FIFA eligibility rules; some limited exceptions apply. Players may hold more than one non-FIFA nationality.

No.	Pos.	Nation	Player
3	DF	THA	Ratchanon Phangkaew
4	DF	NGR	Richest chekwube Abuzor
6	DF	THA	Chayupol Vongsaroj
7	FW	KOR	Yoon Jun-seok
9	FW	THA	Patiphan Pinsermsootsri
13	MF	THA	Sutin Iamsa-ard
16	FW	THA	Sitthinan Rungrueang
17	MF	THA	Punyawat Srihom
18	GK	THA	Suthasin Jitpraphai
19	FW	KOR	Kim Tae -kgeun
23	DF	THA	Sarawut Choenchai
24	MF	THA	Robbie Boldock
25	MF	THA	Jiradech Seangsanga

No.	Pos.	Nation	Player
28	FW	THA	William Harris
30	DF	THA	Phongsakon Waeowichiar
31	DF	THA	Thanatkit Sornkongkum
33	MF	THA	Nakarin Mophang
38	GK	THA	Watcharapol Jutaputthl
43	FW	THA	Phubet Reunreang
46	GK	THA	Abdulfarus Sama-aeh
51	DF	THA	Thanyawut Phichitwanakam
55	FW	THA	Kantawit Jongtep
70	MF	THA	Saharat Yangon
77	MF	THA	Phutaress Chantasom
88	FW	THA	Thinnapob Raihinthaung
89	FW	THA	Pornnarong Rodjakthuk
98	DF	THA	Thinnakit Manprakhon

== Honours ==
=== Domestic leagues ===
- Thai League 4 Western Region
  - Winners (1): 2019
- Regional League Central-West Division
  - Winners (1): 2014
- Khǒr Royal Cup
  - Runners-up: 2012
