= Samut Songkhram City F.C. =

Samut Songkhram City สมุทรสงคราม ซิตี้
- Full name: Samut Songkhram City Football Club
- Nicknames: The killer stingrays (กระเบนพิฆาต)
- Founded: 2021; 5 years ago
- Ground: Samut Songkhram Stadium; Samut Songkhram, Thailand
- Capacity: 6,000
- Coordinates: 13°24′51″N 100°00′00″E
- Owner(s): Samutsongkhram City Co., Ltd.
- Head coach: Rungroj Tongthinphu
- League: Thai League 3
- 2025–26: Thai League 3, 5th of 11 in the Western region
- Website: samut-songkhram-city-fc.com

Samut Songkhram City Football Club (Thai สโมสรฟุตบอล สมุทรสงคราม ซิตี้), is a Thai football club based in Mueang, Samut Songkhram, Thailand. The club plays in the Thai League 3 Western region.

== History ==
Samut Songkhram City Football Club was founded in 2021 following the restructuring of football teams in Samut Songkhram Province. The club was established to represent the province in Thai football league system, after the original Samut Songkhram faced financial and organizational challenges.

In the 2024 season, Samut Songkhram City competed in the 2024 Thailand Semi-pro League Western region and promoted to the Thai League 3 at the end of the season. The club strengthened its squad by signing several foreign players to boost competitiveness.

Ahead of the 2024–25 season, Samut Songkhram City was highlighted as one of the key newcomers expected to make an impact in Thai League 3. The club continues to develop its squad and facilities with ambitions of progressing to higher divisions in the future.

== Stadium and locations ==
| Coordinates | Location | Stadium | Year |
|---|---|---|---|
| 13°24′51″N 100°00′00″E | Mueang, Samut Songkhram | Samut Songkhram Stadium | 2024 – present |

== Season by season record ==
| Season | League | | | | | | | | | FA Cup | League Cup | T3 Cup | Top goalscorer | |
| Season | Division | P | W | D | L | F | A | Pts | Pos | FA Cup | League Cup | T3 Cup | Name | Goals |
|---|---|---|---|---|---|---|---|---|---|---|---|---|---|---|
| 2024 | TS West | 6 | 3 | 2 | 1 | 12 | 6 | 11 | 1st | Opted out | Ineligible | | (Thailand) Jaturathap Srisuwan, (Thailand) Natee Tampradab, (Thailand) Raphiphat Pommo, (Thailand) Thanawin Tanthatemi | 2 |
| 2024–25 | T3 West | 22 | 7 | 6 | 9 | 34 | 35 | 27 | 6th | Opted out | QR1 | LP | (Nigeria) Edmund Sunday, (Nigeria) Ugwuoke Pascal Ozioma | 6 |
| 2025–26 | T3 West | 20 | 8 | 5 | 7 | 23 | 28 | 29 | 5th | R1 | QR2 | SF | (Nigeria) Ugwuoke Pascal Ozioma | 10 |

| Champions | Runners-up | Promoted | Relegated |

- P = Played
- W = Games won
- D = Games drawn
- L = Games lost
- F = Goals for
- A = Goals against
- Pts = Points
- Pos = Final position
- QR1 = First Qualifying Round
- QR2 = Second Qualifying Round
- R1 = Round 1
- R2 = Round 2
- R3 = Round 3
- R4 = Round 4
- R5 = Round 5
- R6 = Round 6
- QF = Quarter-finals
- SF = Semi-finals
- RU = Runners-up
- W = Winners

== Players ==
=== Current squad ===
As of 2 January 2026

Note: Flags indicate national team as defined under FIFA eligibility rules; some limited exceptions apply. Players may hold more than one non-FIFA nationality.

| No. | Pos. | Nation | Player |
|---|---|---|---|
| 1 | GK | THA | Poorinut Kwangdang |
| 2 | DF | THA | Nathaphong Faksuwan |
| 3 | DF | THA | Worawit Wanwon |
| 4 | DF | THA | Thanakorn Chitchuea |
| 5 | DF | THA | Warawoot Suphakomnoed |
| 6 | MF | THA | Datchrit Chotichujtipisal |
| 7 | MF | THA | Teeranan Saenta |
| 8 | MF | THA | Natee Tampradab |
| 9 | FW | THA | Thanawin Tanthatemi |
| 10 | MF | THA | Kulawat Hatsathaphan |
| 11 | MF | THA | Athiwat Prayoon |
| 12 | DF | THA | Taechakorn Khuntiangtam |
| 13 | DF | THA | Phitchakon Chamchiam |
| 14 | MF | THA | Thonthan Chim-ong |
| 15 | DF | THA | Phongsakorn Juchian |

| No. | Pos. | Nation | Player |
|---|---|---|---|
| 16 | MF | THA | Piyawat Khamseewad |
| 17 | DF | THA | Thanaphon Temphrom |
| 18 | GK | ARG | Lucas Daniel Echenique |
| 19 | MF | THA | Kritchanol Jantarasakul |
| 21 | FW | NGR | Edmund Sunday |
| 22 | DF | THA | Rachata Jorasa |
| 23 | DF | IRI | Amir Mohammad Karamdar |
| 24 | DF | THA | Abubar Tohreng |
| 25 | GK | THA | Anuchar Sodadee |
| 26 | MF | THA | Korakrit Poulbour |
| 27 | FW | THA | Kittituch Rojanagoson |
| 28 | MF | THA | Thossaporn Bunlapsathaporn |
| 29 | MF | THA | Pakpoom Poomsongtham |
| 30 | FW | THA | Monkon Kingmala |
| 98 | MF | THA | Boonyachat Kohklang |

== Club staff ==
| Position | Name |
|---|---|
| Club President | (Thailand) Chaiya Buncharoen |
| Team Manager | (Thailand) Sarawut Kluayjamnong |
| Head coach | (Thailand) Rungroj Tongthinphu |
| Assistant Coach | (Thailand) Phanupong Khem-Amornwet |
| Goalkeeper Coach | (Argentina) Lucas Daniel |
| Fitness Coach | |
| Doctor | |
| Physiotherapists | |
| Team Staff | |
| Team Officer | |
| Media Officer | |
