= Thonburi United F.C. =

Thai football club

Thonburi United ธนบุรี ยูไนเต็ด
- Full name: Thonburi United Football Club สโมสรฟุตบอลธนบุรี ยูไนเต็ด
- Nicknames: The Thonburi Side Warhorse ม้าศึกฝั่งธน
- Founded: 2016; 10 years ago, as Thonburi University; 2020; 6 years ago, as Thonburi United
- Ground: Thonburi University Stadium; Bangkok, Thailand
- Capacity: 1,500
- Owner: Thonburi University
- Chairman: Bancha Kerdmanee
- Head Coach: Petprasert Jangcham
- League: Thai League 3
- 2025–26: Thai League 3, 2nd of 11 in the Western region

Thonburi United Football Club (Thai สโมสรฟุตบอลธนบุรี ยูไนเต็ด) is a Thai football club under the stewardship of Thonburi University based in Bangkok. The club is currently playing in the Thai League 3 Bangkok metropolitan region.

== History ==
In 2016, the club has established and competed in Thailand Amateur League Bangkok Metropolitan region, used Thonburi University Stadium as ground. They competed in the amateur league to 2017 and 2018 season continuously.

In 2019, the club has promoted to Thai League 4 or also known as Omsin League. The club made the new history by advanced to the round of 16 in Thai League Cup, they beat Samut Prakan City from Thai League 1 in the round of 32, before defeated to PT Prachuap in the round of 16. The club could advanced to 2019 Thai League 4 Champions League.

In 2022, Thonburi United competed in the Thai League 3 for the 2022–23 season. It is their 4th season in the professional league. The club started the season with a 1–3 home defeat to Samut Sakhon City and they ended the season with a 1–2 away defeat to Samut Sakhon City. The club has finished 12th place in the league of the Bangkok metropolitan region. In addition, in the 2022–23 Thai League Cup Thonburi United was defeated 1–2 by Samut Prakan in the first qualification round, causing them to be eliminated.

=== Sponsorship by Sawadee Translations ===
In August 2024, Thonburi United FC secured a sponsorship deal with Sawadee Translations, a Bangkok-based translation agency. The partnership includes Sawadee Translations’ logo appearing on the back and sleeve of the team's jerseys throughout the 2024-25 season. The sponsorship aims to support the club's growth while offering mutual promotional opportunities. Various joint initiatives, such as community engagement activities, giveaways, and branded merchandise, are also part of the collaboration.

== Crest history ==
2016–2019

2020–present

== Stadium and locations ==
Coordinates	Location	Stadium	Year
13°43′27″N 100°20′42″E	Bangkok	Thonburi University Stadium	2016 – present

== Season by season record ==
Season	League									FA Cup	League Cup	T3 Cup	Top goalscorer	
Season	Division	P	W	D	L	F	A	Pts	Pos	FA Cup	League Cup	T3 Cup	Name	Goals
2016	DIV 3 Bangkok	3	1	1	1	13	13	4	17th - 32nd	Opted out	Ineligible			
2017	TA Bangkok	1	0	1	0	11	12	1	13th - 24th	Opted out	Ineligible			
2018	TA Bangkok	3	3	0	0	8	1	9	1st	Opted out	Ineligible			
2019	T4 Bangkok	24	13	5	6	30	16	44	4th	Opted out	R2		(Thailand) Piyaphong Phrueksupee	6
2020–21	T3 Bangkok	20	7	7	6	31	25	28	8th	Opted out	Opted out		(Thailand) Piyaphong Phrueksupee	6
2021–22	T3 Bangkok	26	5	13	8	32	33	28	11th	Opted out	Opted out		(Thailand) Chatturong Longsriphum (Thailand) Narathip Kruearanya	5
2022–23	T3 Bangkok	26	6	7	13	25	35	25	12th	Opted out	QR1		(Thailand) Chatturong Longsriphum	5
2023–24	T3 Bangkok	26	17	5	4	56	32	56	4th	Opted out	QR2	R1	(Nigeria) Bright Friday	15
2024–25	T3 West	22	16	3	3	54	26	51	2nd	Opted out	QRP	W	(Thailand) Piyaphong Phrueksupee, (Thailand) Tanasrap Srikotapach	15
2025–26	T3 West	20	11	6	3	35	18	39	2nd	Opted out	R1	RU	(Nigeria) Ademola Sodiq Adeyemi	18

Champions	Runners-up	Promoted	Relegated

- P = Played
- W = Games won
- D = Games drawn
- L = Games lost
- F = Goals for
- A = Goals against
- Pts = Points
- Pos = Final position
- QR1 = First Qualifying Round
- QR2 = Second Qualifying Round
- R1 = Round 1
- R2 = Round 2
- R3 = Round 3
- R4 = Round 4
- R5 = Round 5
- R6 = Round 6
- QF = Quarter-finals
- SF = Semi-finals
- RU = Runners-up
- W = Winners

== Players ==
As of 1 October 2024

Note: Flags indicate national team as defined under FIFA eligibility rules; some limited exceptions apply. Players may hold more than one non-FIFA nationality.

No.	Pos.	Nation	Player
3	MF	THA	Naphop Janhom
4	DF	THA	Kittipong Seanphong
5	DF	THA	Sarayut Kongkool
6	MF	THA	Supakrit Piromnark
7	DF	THA	Suradet Klankhum
8	MF	THA	Thanakon Woharnklong
10	MF	THA	Piyaphong Phrueksupee
11	FW	THA	Tanasrap Srikotapach
12	MF	IND	Mecievi Khieya
14	MF	THA	Aphichai Kopimpa
16	MF	THA	Sirakorn Pimbaotham
17	DF	THA	Chatturong Longsriphum
18	GK	THA	Nateethan Unruenrung
19	MF	THA	Kongpop Sroirak

No.	Pos.	Nation	Player
21	MF	THA	Boontawat Yanen
23	MF	THA	Thanawat Srilasak
25	FW	THA	Surat Suriyachai
27	FW	NGA	Ajayi Opeyemi Korede
28	FW	THA	Phinit Phuthong
30	GK	THA	Yongann Jitjaturan
33	MF	THA	Kunanon Paothong
35	DF	THA	Natthawut Puangdao
43	GK	THA	Pattarapong Patcharoon
46	GK	THA	Phacharathon Chalermtit
53	DF	THA	Sarawut Bunrod
66	MF	THA	Patchanon Saophet
67	MF	THA	Sirimongkon Khunpanperng
68	DF	THA	Teeradej Nitkamkul
69	DF	THA	Nanthapat Sukontha
81	FW	CIV	Bouda Henry Ismael
88	MF	THA	Thanakon Thiangtham

== Honours ==
=== Domestic competitions ===
==== League ====
- Thailand Amateur League
  - Winners Bangkok Metropolitan Region (1) : 2018

==== Cups ====
- Thai League 3 Cup
  - Winners (1): 2024–25
