= Maraleina F.C. =

Maraleina มาราเลน่า
- Full name: Maraleina Football Club
- Nicknames: Maraleina (มาราเลน่า)
- Founded: 2006; 20 years ago, as Department of Science Service Football Club; 2009; 17 years ago, as Kanjanapat Football Club; 2023; 3 years ago, as Maraleina Football Club
- Ground: Stadium of Valaya Alongkorn Rajabhat University under the Royal Patronage; Pathum Thani, Thailand
- Capacity: 5,000
- Coordinates: 14°08′00″N 100°36′25″E
- Chairman: Winai Kanjanapat
- Head coach: René Desaeyere
- League: Thai League 3
- 2024–25: Thai League 3, 10th of 12 in the Western region
- Website: maraleina-fc.com

Maraleina Football Club (Thai สโมสรฟุตบอลมาราเลน่า), is a Thai professional football club based in Khlong Luang, Pathum Thani, Thailand. The club is currently playing in the Thai League 3 Western region.

== History ==
In 2006, the club was established in Sisaket under the name of Department of Science Service Football Club.

In 2009, the club was renamed Kanjanapat Football Club and competed in the FS-League until 2018.

In 2019, the club began to compete in the 2019 Thailand Amateur League Western region, using the Stadium of Bangkok University Rangsit Campus as the ground. At the end of the season, they have promoted to the 2020 Thai League 4.

In 2020, the club became a professional football club and competed in the Thai League 4. However, the Football Association of Thailand merged the Thai League 3 and Thai League 4. As a result of this incident, all teams in Thai League 4 were promoted to Thai League 3. The club competed in the Thai League 3 for the 2020–21 season. In late December 2020, the Coronavirus disease 2019 or also known as COVID-19 had spread again in Thailand, the FA Thailand must abruptly end the regional stage of the Thai League 3. The club has finished the eleventh place of the Western region.

In 2021, the 2021–22 season is the second consecutive season in the Thai League 3 of Kanjanapat. They started the season with a 0–0 home drawn to Angthong and they ended the season with a 0–1 away defeated to the Angthong. The club has finished eighth place in the league of the Western region. In addition, in the 2021–22 Thai FA Cup Kanjanapat was defeated 1–6 by Muang Loei United in the qualification round, causing them to be eliminated. In the 2021–22 Thai League Cup Kanjanapat was defeated 0–1 by Phitsanulok in the qualification play-off round, causing them to be eliminated too.

In 2022, Kanjanapat competed in the Thai League 3 for the 2022–23 season. It is their 3rd season in the professional league. The club started the season with a 4–0 away win over Thawi Watthana Samut Sakhon United and they ended the season with a 5–1 home win over Thawi Watthana Samut Sakhon United. The club has finished 10th place in the league of the Western region. In addition, in the 2022–23 Thai League Cup Kanjanapat was defeated 0–3 by Samut Songkhram in the second qualification round, causing them to be eliminated.

== Stadium and locations ==
Coordinates	Location	Stadium	Year
14°02′19″N 100°36′08″E	Khlong Nueng, Khlong Luang, Pathum Thani	Stadium of Bangkok University Rangsit Campus	2019
14°02′06″N 100°43′23″E	Khlong Hok, Khlong Luang, Pathum Thani	Stadium of Rajamangala University of Technology Thanyaburi	2020 – 2021
14°00′22″N 100°40′24″E	Bueng Yitho, Thanyaburi, Pathum Thani	Stadium of North Bangkok University	2021 – 2022
14°08′00″N 100°36′25″E	Khlong Nueng, Khlong Luang, Pathum Thani	Stadium of Valaya Alongkorn Rajabhat University under the Royal Patronage	2023 – present

== Season by season record ==
Season	League									FA Cup	League Cup	T3 Cup	Top goalscorer	
Season	Division	P	W	D	L	F	A	Pts	Pos	FA Cup	League Cup	T3 Cup	Name	Goals
2019	TA West	3	2	1	0	4	2	7	1st	Opted out	Ineligible			
2020–21	T3 West	17	3	3	11	9	33	12	11th	Opted out	Opted out		(Guinea) Sylla Sekou Nana	5
2021–22	T3 West	20	6	3	11	15	22	21	8th	QR	QRP		(Thailand) Teerapong Malai	5
2022–23	T3 West	22	5	6	11	30	37	21	10th	Opted out	QR2		(Thailand) Intouch Yamyindee	11
2023–24	T3 West	20	6	9	5	40	20	27	7th	R1	QRP	Opted out	(Thailand) Chitsanuphong Phimpsang	19
2024–25	T3 West	22	3	7	12	18	38	16	10th	R1	R1	LP	(Thailand) Pitchayut Chaiyosaeng	5

Champions	Runners-up	Promoted	Relegated

- P = Played
- W = Games won
- D = Games drawn
- L = Games lost
- F = Goals for
- A = Goals against
- Pts = Points
- Pos = Final position
- QR1 = First Qualifying Round
- QR2 = Second Qualifying Round
- R1 = Round 1
- R2 = Round 2
- R3 = Round 3
- R4 = Round 4
- R5 = Round 5
- R6 = Round 6
- QF = Quarter-finals
- SF = Semi-finals
- RU = Runners-up
- W = Winners

== Players ==
=== First team squad ===
Note: Flags indicate national team as defined under FIFA eligibility rules; some limited exceptions apply. Players may hold more than one non-FIFA nationality.

No.	Pos.	Nation	Player
1	GK	THA	Thanawit Uamsa-Ard
4	DF	SEN	Tall Mouhamadou Fallou Mbacke
5	MF	THA	David Songsumpao
6	DF	THA	Pantawit Inthamut
7	FW	THA	Pitchayut Chaiyosaeng
8	MF	THA	Rachata Prachasin
10	FW	CIV	Abdel Razak Diomande
12	DF	THA	Akarat Thoburee
14	MF	THA	Amornwit Bunarpha
15	DF	THA	Thanphisit Chunu
17	DF	THA	Naradeth Sitthidet
19	MF	THA	Jaranin Promchaisee
21	DF	THA	Natthawat Klomkliaw
22	DF	THA	Sretthaphon Liain
23	FW	THA	Jirapat Klimkaew
26	DF	THA	Natchakchai Kumpo

No.	Pos.	Nation	Player
27	FW	CMR	Isaac Mbengan
28	MF	THA	Narawit Thamsunee
29	GK	THA	Peeranai Sruisong
30	MF	THA	Wasitphon Watcharasin
31	FW	THA	Kritsanai Panesana
34	FW	THA	Kanok Sangkasopha
46	GK	THA	Tharmatazs Cherdtrakul
48	DF	THA	Kittisak Pongsanin
58	DF	THA	Nattawut Thongchan
66	MF	THA	Achalawit Bunpetch
77	MF	THA	Viriya Vilaitanarak
81	DF	THA	Thanathorn Pholpima
88	DF	THA	Chayangkoon Pinthong
97	MF	THA	Pannawich Thongviriyakul
98	MF	THA	Suttipart Rungsivannagun
