= Kanchanaburi City F.C. =

Kanchanaburi City F.C. กาญจนบุรี ซิตี้ เอฟ.ซี.
- Full name: Kanchanaburi City Football Club (สโมสรฟุตบอลกาญจนบุรีซิตี้)
- Nicknames: The black panthers (เสือดำ)
- Founded: 2022; 3 years ago
- Ground: Khao Noi Municipality Stadium; Kanchanaburi, Thailand
- Capacity: 2,000
- Coordinates: 13°57′48″N 99°35′35″E
- Owner(s): Kanchanaburi City Co., Ltd.
- Chairman: Anan Maentim
- Head coach: Parinya Jaruhati
- League: Thai League 3
- 2024–25: Thai League 3, 12th of 12 in the Western region (relegated)
- Website: web.facebook.com/KanchanaburiCityFC

Kanchanaburi City Football Club (Thai: สโมสรฟุตบอลกาญจนบุรีซิตี้) is a Thai football club based in Tha Muang, Kanchanaburi, Thailand. The club is currently playing in the Thai League 3 Western region.

== History ==
In early 2022, the club was established and competed in Thailand Amateur League Western region, using the Khao Noi Municipality Stadium as the ground. At the end of the season, the club could be promoted to the Thai League 3. They use the Khao Noi Municipality Stadium as a ground to compete for the T3 in the 2022–23 season.

In late 2022, Kanchanaburi City competed in the Thai League 3 for the 2022–23 season. It is their first season in the professional league. The club started the season with a 4–1 away win over Saraburi United and they ended the season with a 2–0 home win over the Saraburi United. The club has finished fourth place in the league of the Western region. In addition, in the 2022–23 Thai FA Cup Kanchanaburi City was defeated 1–2 by Wat Bot City in the second round, causing them to be eliminated and in the 2022–23 Thai League Cup Kanchanaburi City defeated 1–2 to Pathumthani University in the first qualification round, causing them to be eliminated too.

== Stadium and locations ==
Coordinates	Location	Stadium	Year
13°57′48″N 99°35′35″E	Kanchanaburi	Khao Noi Municipality Stadium	2022 – present

== Season by season record ==
Season	League									FA Cup	League Cup	T3 Cup	Top goalscorer	
Season	Division	P	W	D	L	F	A	Pts	Pos	FA Cup	League Cup	T3 Cup	Name	Goals
2022	TA West	6	4	2	0	9	5	14	1st	Opted out	Ineligible		(Thailand) Pannawat Nitiyajang	3
2022–23	T3 West	22	12	5	5	28	21	41	4th	R2	QR1		(Myanmar) Than Paing	12
2023–24	T3 West	20	8	8	4	31	17	32	6th	Opted out	Opted out	QR2	(Thailand) Suchao Nuchnum, (Thailand) Yannatat Wannatong, (Thailand) Paripan Wongsa	5
2024–25	T3 West	22	3	5	14	20	53	14	12th	Opted out	Opted out	Opted out	(Thailand) Naphat Rajanpan	5

Champions	Runners-up	Promoted	Relegated

- P = Played
- W = Games won
- D = Games drawn
- L = Games lost
- F = Goals for
- A = Goals against
- Pts = Points
- Pos = Final position
- QR1 = First Qualifying Round
- QR2 = Second Qualifying Round
- R1 = Round 1
- R2 = Round 2
- R3 = Round 3
- R4 = Round 4
- R5 = Round 5
- R6 = Round 6
- QF = Quarter-finals
- SF = Semi-finals
- RU = Runners-up
- W = Winners

== Players ==
=== Current squad ===
As of 27 September 2024

Note: Flags indicate national team as defined under FIFA eligibility rules; some limited exceptions apply. Players may hold more than one non-FIFA nationality.

No.	Pos.	Nation	Player
1	GK	THA	Thanakorn Orachorn
3	DF	KOR	Kim Geon-woo
4	FW	THA	Naphat Rajanpan
5	DF	THA	Rattapoom Joompla
7	FW	THA	Thitiwut Ngamprom
8	MF	THA	Autapong Putpog
11	DF	THA	Khemmachat Pakhwan
12	DF	THA	Ratchanon Phangkeaw
14	MF	THA	Keattisak Sanitkham
15	MF	THA	Attapol Boonkun
17	FW	THA	Rittiya Sarakham
18	GK	THA	Anusorn Chansod
20	DF	THA	Thanawat Uaongwun
22	GK	KOR	Kim Min-jae
23	MF	THA	Kittiwet Lochit

No.	Pos.	Nation	Player
26	DF	THA	Rachakarn Kamolpromwong
27	GK	THA	[Nitipat Chuemklang
30	DF	THA	Thanaphon Dekosta
33	GK	THA	Jirayur Kaewthong
37	FW	THA	Niphon Anantabut
48	DF	THA	Chavarit Chimplee
50	FW	GHA	Castle Ntih Mensah
65	DF	THA	Kittinat Nuamnimanong
66	DF	THA	Kantawan Maneechok
67	GK	THA	eerapat Pinpradub
70	DF	THA	Chatkavee Maneechot
77	FW	THA	Witsarut Chotpraderm
78	DF	THA	Pannathon Somjettanarom
88	MF	THA	Piyangkun Gansomrong
90	GK	THA	Theerawat Pinpradub
