= Phoutthasay Khochalern =

Laotian footballer (born 1995)

Personal information
- Date of birth: 29 December 1995 (age 30)
- Place of birth: Savannakhet, Laos
- Height: 1.73 m (5 ft 8 in)
- Position: Midfielder

Team information
- Current team: Savannakhet
- Number: 28

Youth career
- 2007–2011: Ezra

Senior career*
| Years | Team | Apps | (Gls) |
| 2013–2015 | Ezra | | |
| 2015–2016 | Lao Police Club | | |
| 2016–2018 | Lanexang United | | |
| 2018–2021 | Nakhon Pathom United | 47 | (3) |
| 2021–2022 | Samut Prakan City | 22 | (0) |
| 2023 | Ezra | 0 | (0) |
| 2023–2024 | Thap Luang United | 11 | (1) |
| 2025–2026 | Ezra | 15 | (2) |
| 2026– | Savannakhet | 0 | (0) |

International career^{‡}
| 2013–2018 | Laos U23 | 12 | (3) |
| 2013–2024 | Laos | 42 | (1) |
- * Club domestic league appearances and goals as of 4 May 2022 ‡ National team caps and goals as of 27 March 2022

Phoutthasay Khochalern (Lao: ພຸດທະໄຊ ໂຄຈະເລີນ, born 29 December 1995) is a Laotian professional footballer who plays as a midfielder for Savannakhet in Lao League 1.

== International career ==
Phoutthasay is a long-time Laotian international, having been called up for the first time in 2013 at 18. He captained Laos at the 2018 Asian Games in Indonesia, where he scored a goal against Palestine in a 2–1 loss.

== Career statistics ==
Scores and results list Laos' goal tally first.

| No. | Date | Venue | Opponent | Score | Result | Competition |
|---|---|---|---|---|---|---|
| 1. | 18 October 2014 | New Laos National Stadium, Vientiane, Laos | Timor-Leste | 1–0 | 2–0 | 2014 AFF Championship qualification |
