= Hua Hin Municipal Stadium =

Multi-purpose stadium in Thailand

Coordinates: 12.526877°N 99.969199°E

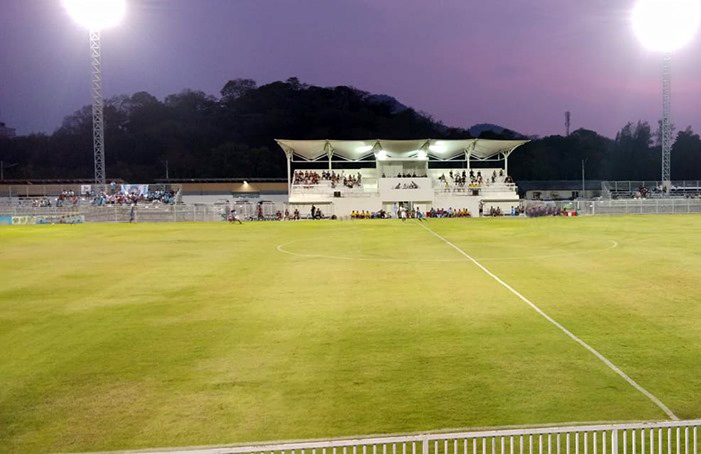
- Interactive map of Hua Hin Municipal Stadium
- Former names: Khao Takiap Stadium
- Location: Hua Hin, Prachuap Khiri Khan, Thailand
- Owner: Hua Hin Municipality
- Operator: Hua Hin Municipality
- Capacity: 3,000
- Surface: Grass

Construction
- Opened: 2015

Tenant
- Hua Hin City

Hua Hin Municipal Stadium (Thai: สนามกีฬาเทศบาลเมืองหัวหิน) (known as Khao Takiap Stadium) is a multi-purpose stadium in Hua Hin District, Prachuap Khiri Khan Province, Thailand. It is currently used mostly for football matches and is the home stadium of Hua Hin City. The stadium holds 3,000 people.
