= 2018 Thai League Cup =

Toyota League Cup

Tournament details
- Country: Thailand
- Dates: 28 February 2018 – 20 October 2018
- Teams: 82

Final positions
- Champions: Chiangrai United (1st title)
- Runners-up: Bangkok Glass

Tournament statistics
- Matches played: 81
- Goals scored: 242 (2.99 per match)
- Top goal scorer(s): Bill; Burnel Okana (5 goals)

Awards
- Best player: Chatchai Budprom

The 2018 Thai League Cup is the 9th season in the second era of a Thailand's knockout football competition. All games are played as a single match. It was sponsored by Toyota, and known as the Toyota League Cup (Thai: โตโยต้า ลีกคัพ) for sponsorship purposes. 82 clubs were accepted into the tournament, and it began with the first qualification round on 28 February 2018, and concluded with the final on 20 October 2018. The tournament has been readmitted back into Thai football after a 10-year absence. The prize money for this prestigious award is said to be around 5 million baht and the runners-up will be netting 1 million baht.

The prize money is not the only benefit of this cup, the team winning the fair play spot will get a Hilux Vigo. The MVP of the competition will get a Toyota Camry Hybrid Car.

This is the first edition of the competition and the qualifying round will be played in regions featuring clubs from the Thai League 3 and Thai League 4.

== Calendar ==
| Round | Date | Matches | Clubs | New entries this round |
|---|---|---|---|---|
| First qualification round | 28 February 2018 | 15 | 16 + 28 → 22 of Second qualification round 1 + 5 → 3 of Qualification play-off round | 17 2018 Thai League 3; 33 2018 Thai League 4 |
| Second qualification round | 7 March 2018 | 11 | 22 → 11 | |
| Qualification play-off round | 18 April 2018 | 14 | 11 + 3 + 14 → 14 | 14 2018 Thai League 2 |
| First round | 13 June 2018 | 16 | 14 + 18 → 16 | 18 2018 Thai League |
| Second round | 11 July 2018 | 8 | 16 → 8 | |
| Quarter-finals | 8 August 2018 | 4 | 8 → 4 | |
| Semi-finals | 19 September 2018 | 2 | 4 → 2 | |
| Final | 20 October 2018 | 1 | 2 → Champions | |
| Total | | | | 82 clubs |

== Results ==
Note: T1: Clubs from Thai League 1; T2: Clubs from Thai League 2; T3: Clubs from Thai League 3; T4: Clubs from Thai League 4; T5: Clubs from Thailand Amateur League.

=== First qualification round ===
There were seventeen clubs from 2018 Thai League 3 and thirty-three clubs from 2018 Thai League 4 have signed to qualifying in 2018 Thai League cup. Qualification round had drawn on 21 February 2018 by FA Thailand.

Upper region
The qualifying round will be played in regions featuring clubs from the 2018 Thai League 4 Northern Region, 2018 Thai League 4 North Eastern Region, some of the 2018 Thai League 4 Western Region, 2018 Thai League 4 Bangkok Metropolitan Region, and 2018 Thai League 3 Upper Region.

| 28 February 2018 | Surin Sugar Khong Chee Mool (T4) | 3 – 1 | Chainat United (T4) | Surin |
| 15:30 (UTC+7) | Jattupon Nueakaew 36'; Wisitsak Bunsawas 70', 85' | Report | Natthapat Rak-yu 29' | Stadium: Rajamangala University of Technology Isan Stadium, Surin Campus; Attendance: 100; Referee: Chayanan Thuto; Assistant referees: Sarawut Suksalee, Permkhet Boonrod; Fourth official: Pornlarp Bamrungthai |

| 28 February 2018 | Muang Loei United (T4) | 2 – 1 | Khon Kaen United (T4) | Loei |
| 15:30 (UTC+7) | Kajohnsak I-joy 56'; Chawin Thirawatsri 62' | Report | Bill Sida 84' | Stadium: Wang Saphung District Stadium; Attendance: 200; Referee: Sittichai Saramai; Assistant referees: Watchara Sittirak, Yuranan Nookhaw; Fourth official: Prawit Bangkratok |

| 28 February 2018 | BGC (T4) | 0 – 0 (a.e.t.) (2 – 4 p) | Chiangrai City (T3) | Pathum Thani |
| 15:30 (UTC+7) | | Report | | Stadium: North Bangkok University Stadium (Rangsit); Attendance: 217; Referee: Ekkachai Petcham; Assistant referees: Phadungkiat Piangdee, Watcharaphan Prasomphol; Fourth official: Samrit Ritkaew |
| | Penalties |
| | Samba Yuya (penalty scored); Thammayut Rakboon (penalty missed); Samroeng Hanchiaw (penalty scored); Pongpet Thongklet (penalty missed) | | (penalty scored) Raphael Diniz; (penalty missed) Chaiyahan Aunjit; (penalty scored) Warawut Motim; (penalty scored) Narachai Intanaka; (penalty scored) Nantawat Thaensopa |

| 28 February 2018 | Nakhon Ratchasima Huai Thalaeng United (T4) | 0 – 2 | Nakhon Sawan (T4) | Nakhon Ratchasima |
| 15:30 (UTC+7) | | Report | Kritchaphon Ruamrua 47', 69' | Stadium: Suranaree University of Technology Stadium; Attendance: 120; Referee: Uthai Purase; Assistant referees: Pakorn Dongcharoen, Kritsana Hanthongchai; Fourth official: Thanawat Piromnak |

| 28 February 2018 | Sakon Nakhon (T4) | 3 – 0 | Air Force Robinson (T4) | Sakon Nakhon |
| 15:30 (UTC+7) | Natthikorn Yaprom 21'; Decha Sirifong 24'; Niyom Kamchompoo 74' | Report | | Stadium: Sakon Nakhon Provincial Stadium; Attendance: 100; Referee: Pisit Boonthongpaeng; Assistant referees: Pongsira Phuangket, Anusit Thaweekot; Fourth official: Saharat Jaktirit |

| 28 February 2018 | Kamphaengphet (T3) | 0 – 1 (a.e.t.) | Loei City (T4) | Kamphaengphet |
| 15:30 (UTC+7) | | Report; Highlight | Teeraphan Pongkamla 92' | Stadium: Cha Kung Rao Stadium; Attendance: 100; Referee: Puttipong Isisingh; Assistant referees: Supakit Boonnok, Thongsuk Thiamrat; Fourth official: Chalit Ploypech |

| 28 February 2018 | Kopoon Warrior (T4) | 2 – 2 (a.e.t.) (6 – 7 p) | Phitsanulok (T4) | Ayutthaya |
| 15:30 (UTC+7) | Pattarachai Satitwas 90+5'; Suwit Paipromrat 117' | Report; Half-time Highlight; Full-time Highlight; Penalties-time Highlight | Anucha Phantong 14'; Bayano Sobze Henri 120' | Stadium: Senabodee Stadium; Attendance: 55; Referee: Saksit Ngakhom; Assistant referees: Seksan Pansri, Sahasnet Deemongkol; Fourth official: Chanachai Promtat |
| | Penalties |
| | Suwit Paipromrat (penalty scored); Wittawat Wongnarat (penalty scored); Pattarachai Satitwas (penalty missed); Wichitchai Raksa (penalty scored); Anek Vichairat (penalty scored); Anirut Jandaeng (penalty missed); Chaiwichit Suanchaiyaphum (penalty scored); Teerawat Kamsiang (penalty scored); Suwit Paipromrat (penalty missed) | | (penalty missed) Narit Klaysap; (penalty scored) Bayano Sobze Henri; (penalty scored) Anucha Phantong; (penalty scored) Takaaki Aoshima; (penalty scored) Itthipol Janpang-ngoen; (penalty missed) José Carlos Sánchez; (penalty scored) Lertrit Khun-udon; (penalty scored) Adisak Kunson; (penalty scored) Bayano Sobze Henri |

| 28 February 2018 | Nan (T4) | 3 – 1 | Grakcu Sai Mai United (T4) | Nan |
| 15:30 (UTC+7) | Thanawut Butwong 17'; Souleymane Toure 58'; Saravut Maiwong 76' | Report; Highlight | Krittanon Thanachotjaroenphon 65' | Stadium: Nan PAO. Stadium; Attendance: 250; Referee: Wutipong Ketkham; Assistant referees: Yothin Sukomud, Opas Omsomsuay; Fourth official: Supakit Kadee |

| 28 February 2018 | Uttaradit (T4) | 1 – 0 | Samut Prakan (T4) | Uttaradit |
| 18:00 (UTC+7) | Patipat Kamsat 36' | Report; Highlight | | Stadium: Mon-mai Stadium; Attendance: 380; Referee: Suchin Keawsopa; Assistant referees: Pratheep Chaiyapornkul, Thanongsak Sutthi; Fourth official: Adisorn Puengsathit |

| 28 February 2018 | Singburi Bangrajun (T4) | 1 – 1 (a.e.t.) (4 – 5 p) | Bangkok (T3) | Singburi |
| 18:00 (UTC+7) | Michael Kwasi Mawunyo 90+5' | Report; Full-time Highlight; Penalties-time Highlight | Noppaklao Damrongthai 7' (o.g.) | Stadium: Singburi Provincial Stadium; Attendance: 215; Referee: Wiritpol Pluemsil; Assistant referees: Adisorn Pomnoi, Parinya Lunla; Fourth official: Wittaya Jueachan |
| | Penalties |
| | Noppaklao Damrongthai (penalty scored); Michael Kwasi Mawunyo (penalty scored); Phakphum Phonjaroen (penalty scored); Piyawut Thongtha (penalty scored); Prachaya Somboondee (penalty missed); Charoenpong Ketsupa (penalty missed) | | (penalty scored) Sarunyu Plangwan; (penalty missed) Petch Laohaserikul; (penalty scored) Kittisak Hochin; (penalty scored) Wayu Klinsa-ard; (penalty scored) Kan Kleebphueag; (penalty scored) Kittipong Supanya |

| 28 February 2018 | Dome (T4) | 0 – 0 (a.e.t.) (7 – 6 p) | Marines Eureka (T3) | Pathum Thani |
| 18:00 (UTC+7) | | Report | | Stadium: Thammasat Stadium; Attendance: 81; Referee: Palakorn Parasathit; Assistant referees: Anusorn Saengnet, Namporn Seemee; Fourth official: Nikom Wangsaeng |
| | Penalties |
| | Thora Charoensuk (penalty scored); Piravich Aroonrat (penalty missed); Krittanai Siangsai (penalty scored); Bundit Panponpai (penalty scored); Naruttone Meesungnoen (penalty scored); Pitchakorn Jinyong (penalty scored); Surachai Thongta (penalty scored); Akarachai Sematangcharoen (penalty scored) | | (penalty scored) Lionel Frank; (penalty scored) Weerachai Sapprasert; (penalty scored) Mbassegus Mbarga; (penalty scored) Pramote Kempetch; (penalty missed) Rattaporn Saetun; (penalty scored) Jakrayut Vivatvanit; (penalty scored) Teerasak Phosetong; (penalty missed) Kittipong Sangtab |

| 28 February 2018 | Sakaeo (T3) | 0 – 0 (a.e.t.) (4 – 5 p) | Phrae United (T3) | Sakaeo |
| 18:00 (UTC+7) | | Report; Highlight | | Stadium: Sakaeo PAO. Stadium; Attendance: 2,000; Referee: Jirayut Kasipol; Assistant referees: Suknipon Yuennan, Uthen Kaewkanhadechakul; Fourth official: Thitibodee Ramnet |
| | Penalties |
| | Tuangsit Soimee (penalty scored); Rewat Khamwiengchan (penalty scored); Guy Hubert (penalty missed); Visit chuenvanon (penalty scored); Kendall Jagdeosingh (penalty scored); Jamikorn Promsawat (penalty missed) | | (penalty scored) Suriyakarn Chimjeen; (penalty missed) Thiago Elias; (penalty scored) Jhonatan Bernardo; (penalty scored) Sittisak Tarapan; (penalty scored) Boonmee Boonrod; (penalty scored) Cho Hyun-woo |

| 28 February 2018 | Lamphun Warrior (T3) | 3 – 1 | Mahasarakham (T4) | Lamphun |
| 18:30 (UTC+7) | Saran Sridet 31', 69' (pen.); Somchai Singmanee 89' | Report; Highlight | Keeratikorn Jangklan 35' | Stadium: Mae-Guang Stadium; Attendance: 930; Referee: Peerasan Krataithong; Assistant referees: Narong Chaithong, Trongrit Trakulchai; Fourth official: Phuwasak Sukkan |

| 28 February 2018 | Ayutthaya United (T3) | 2 – 1 | Kalasin (T3) | Ayutthaya |
| 18:30 (UTC+7) | Piyanath Chanram 25', 64' | Report; Highlight | Pattarapon Boonpok 45+2' | Stadium: Ayutthaya Provincial Stadium; Attendance: 477; Referee: Teerachai Jampa; Assistant referees: Anucha Pin-amorn, Weerapol Maopaew; Fourth official: Somkid Sarapim |

| 28 February 2018 | Chachoengsao Hi-Tek (T3) | 3 – 1 | JL Chiangmai United (T3) | Chachoengsao |
| 19:00 (UTC+7) | Dominique Nyamsi Jacques 18', 40', 59' | Report; Highlight | Sirayut Krajaisri 90+2' | Stadium: Chachoengsao Municipality Stadium; Attendance: 1,200; Referee: Suttipong Tepa; Assistant referees: Wararit Suwanjira, Chaiwat Loysawai; Fourth official: Atiwat Seelalo |

Lower region
The qualifying round will be played in regions featuring clubs from 2018 Thai League 4 Eastern Region, some of the 2018 Thai League 4 Western Region, 2018 Thai League 4 Southern Region and 2018 Thai League 3 Lower Region.

| 28 February 2018 | Hatyai (T4) | 1 – 0 | Chumphon (T4) | Songkhla |
| 15:30 (UTC+7) | Wisan Kaewthaworn 49' | Report; Highlight | | Stadium: Southern Major City Stadium; Attendance: 60; Referee: Pirot Bunkamnoed; Assistant referees: Preecha Lanui, Wasan Namjaisuk; Fourth official: Mahtoha Sahyoh |

| 28 February 2018 | Kabin United (T4) | 1 – 2 | Nakhon Pathom United (T4) | Prachinburi |
| 15:30 (UTC+7) | Metee Pungpoh 90+1' | Report; Half-time Highlight; Full-time Highlight | Olveira Silva Diego 63', 79' | Stadium: Nom Klao Maharaj Stadium; Attendance: 200; Referee: Somsak Phusomnuek; Assistant referees: Sila Raksawat, Kantrakorn Ngaosri; Fourth official: Pongsakorn Wisitsri |

| 28 February 2018 | Ranong United (T3) | 1 – 0 | Nara United (T3) | Ranong |
| 15:30 (UTC+7) | Burnel Okana-Stazi 61' | Report | | Stadium: Hat Som Paen SAO. Stadium; Attendance: 300; Referee: Sombat Suwanrat; Assistant referees: Siwapong Puttisawong, Thanathat Thongpradit; Fourth official: Nirut Suetrong |

| 28 February 2018 | Rajpracha (T3) | 2 – 1 | Royal Thai Fleet (T4) | Bangkok |
| 15:30 (UTC+7) | Rewat Meerian 37'; Naris Phunsap 60' | Report; Highlight | Wuttichai Asusheewa 51' | Stadium: Thonburi Stadium; Attendance: 65; Referee: Sakda Jitsupaworakul; Assistant referees: Pipop Watkeung, Kiattisak Pongpao; Fourth official: Chaiya Mulmanee |

| 28 February 2018 | Pattani (T4) | 0 – 1 | Hatyai City (T4) | Pattani |
| 15:30 (UTC+7) | | Report | Chairat Madsiri 10' | Stadium: Rainbow Stadium; Attendance: 383; Referee: Sanya Sathitdamrongkul; Assistant referees: Masuelan Makatung, Charoen Nualboon; Fourth official: Manop Lhempan |

| 28 February 2018 | Bankhai United (T4) | 2 – 3 | Surat Thani (T3) | Rayong |
| 15:30 (UTC+7) | Piya Kruawan 68' (pen.); Nattawut Salae 90+3' | Report | Mohamed Kourouma 24' (pen.); Kritsana Chaimongkonrat 41'; Amarin Jaisuesat 72' | Stadium: Wai Krong Stadium; Attendance: 200; Referee: Sarawut Pramodhyakul; Assistant referees: Pakorn Srichumsin, Opas Inthawiset; Fourth official: Sompoch Kotsawas |

| 28 February 2018 | Hua Hin City (T4) | 2 – 0 | Phattalung (T4) | Prachuap Khiri Khan |
| 17:30 (UTC+7) | Nicolas Paul Vandelli 55' (pen.); Arnon Kaimook 60' | Report; Highlight | | Stadium: Khao Takiap Stadium; Attendance: 250; Referee: Sukhon Boonplod; Assistant referees: Prakit Chandamrongsuk, Montree Suripol; Fourth official: Trin Sahachaipat |

| 28 February 2018 | Pluakdaeng Rayong United (T4) | 2 – 0 | Nonthaburi (T4) | Rayong |
| 18:00 (UTC+7) | Adison Phanitnok 17'; Diogo Figueira 60' (pen.) | Report; Half-time Highlight; Full-time Highlight | | Stadium: Rayong Provincial Stadium; Attendance: 470; Referee: Yutthana Ladkrathok; Assistant referees: Traipop Banrai, Pongthep Rhaipimai; Fourth official: Muangmol Wanpakdee |

| 28 February 2018 | Trang (T3) | 3 – 0 | Chanthaburi (T4) | Trang |
| 18:00 (UTC+7) | Adisak Khotchawat 5'; Nattha Thongrod 39'; Fairos Chemae 73' | Report; Highlight | | Stadium: Trang Municipality Stadium; Attendance: 500; Referee: Watcharin Nuthong; Assistant referees: Aris Mhadpanjor, Permsak Saisuwan; Fourth official: Paisan Bendem-alhee |

| 28 February 2018 | BTU United (T3) | 1 – 1 (a.e.t.) (11 – 12 p) | IPE Samut Sakhon United (T4) | Bangkok |
| 19:00 (UTC+7) | Natthawut Sukaram 59' | Report | Pantakan Kasemkulwilai 50' | Stadium: Bangkok-Thonburi University Stadium; Attendance: 387; Referee: Suwat Wannakhan; Assistant referees: Wisit Charoensai, Nualnij Donjangreed; Fourth official: Yutthana Nima |
| | Penalties |
| | Felipe Silva Abreu (penalty scored); Nattawat Wongsri (penalty scored); Sitthinon Ketkaew (penalty scored); Narongrit Khakhai (penalty scored); Teerayut Suecharoen (penalty missed); Wacharapoom Boonyaem (penalty scored); Tanakorn Nakchamsil (penalty scored); Kantapat Leabsawat (penalty scored); Ni-iffan Pattarathikul (penalty scored); Natthawut Suk-aram (penalty scored); Montree Treesang (penalty scored); Felipe Silva Abreu (penalty scored); Nattawat Wongsri (penalty missed) | | (penalty missed) Omar Fernández; (penalty scored) Noppadon Koedrit; (penalty scored) Nutchawit Khunnak; (penalty scored) Jirawat Panla; (penalty scored) Farshid Alizadeh; (penalty scored) Kovit Noyyam; (penalty scored) Pantakan Kasemkulwilai; (penalty scored) Wanchaiwat Chanthaworn; (penalty scored) Kiadtikhun Nueangchaiyod; (penalty scored) Koffi Ludovic Loic Kissi; (penalty scored) Almamy Sylla; (penalty scored) Omar Fernández; (penalty scored) Noppadon Koedrit |

=== Second qualification round ===
The second qualifying round will be featured by twenty-two clubs which were the winners of first qualification round. There were three clubs which were the winners of the previous round had passed to qualification play-off round automatically by drawing; including Nan, Hua Hin City, and Surat Thani.

Upper region
The qualifying round will be played in regions featuring clubs from the 2018 Thai League 4 Northern Region, 2018 Thai League 4 North Eastern Region, 2018 Thai League 4 Bangkok Metropolitan Region, and 2018 Thai League 3 Upper Region.

| 7 March 2018 | Surin Sugar Khong Chee Mool (T4) | 1 – 0 | Muang Loei United (T4) | Surin |
| 15:30 (UTC+7) | Aphiwat Cheunban 71' | Report; Highlight | | Stadium: Rajamangala University of Technology Isan Stadium, Surin Campus; Attendance: 223; Referee: Rattanachai Malison; Assistant referees: Waratchanon Chomboon, Manit Chaipoon; Fourth official: Sirichai Raksapan |

| 7 March 2018 | Sakon Nakhon (T4) | 4 – 1 | Loei City (T4) | Sakon Nakhon |
| 15:30 (UTC+7) | Niyom Kamchompoo 13'; Natthasit Uparachai 52'; Wiwat Homdem 86', 90+1' | Report | Igasaki takashi 28' | Stadium: Sakon Nakhon Provincial Stadium; Attendance: 56; Referee: Anan Kaewmuangkhun; Assistant referees: Pongdanai Sasadee, Passaraporn Manimhud; Fourth official: Panupol Sribunruang |

| 7 March 2018 | Bangkok (T3) | 1 – 0 | Dome (T4) | Nonthaburi |
| 15:30 (UTC+7) | Anuwat Piankaew 60' | Report | | Stadium: SCG Muangthong United Training Stadium; Attendance: 238; Referee: Patiyut Montianarts; Assistant referees: Wararit Suwanjira, Jakkarin Jomnasuan; Fourth official: Surapol Sawangjit |

| 7 March 2018 | Uttaradit (T4) | 1 – 1 (a.e.t.) (4 – 5 p) | Chiangrai City (T3) | Uttaradit |
| 18:00 (UTC+7) | Kobenan Leon N'Guatta 86' | Report; Highlight | Kang Min-gu 45' | Stadium: Mon-mai Stadium; Attendance: 298; Referee: Pornchai Charoenying; Assistant referees: Suknipon Yuennan, Chaiwat Loysawai; Fourth official: Peerasan Krataithong |
| | Penalties |
| | Sarawut Janthaphan (penalty scored); Rachen Kunkong (penalty scored); Pitsanu Ngamsa-nguan (penalty scored); Kobenan Leon N'Guatta (penalty scored); Arboubacar Sanogo Junior (penalty missed); Cherdsak Jampakaw (penalty missed) | | (penalty scored) Chonlawit Kanuengkid; (penalty scored) Raphael Diniz; (penalty scored) Khathathon Mathipikai; (penalty scored) Piyarot Kwangkeaw; (penalty missed) Nantawat Thaensopa; (penalty scored) Sarawut Yodyinghathaikul |

| 7 March 2018 | Phitsanulok (T4) | 0 – 1 | Ayutthaya United (T3) | Phitsanulok |
| 18:00 (UTC+7) | | Report; Highlight | Phutchapong Namseethan 22' | Stadium: Phitsanulok PAO. Stadium; Attendance: 554; Referee: Wittaya Kamuadsap; Assistant referees: Adisorn Pomnoi, Narongwit Tianthong; Fourth official: Somkid Sarapim |

| 7 March 2018 | Phrae United (T3) | 3 – 1 | Chachoengsao Hi-Tek (T3) | Phrae |
| 18:00 (UTC+7) | Adisorn Sapso 62'; Boonmee Boonrod 85', 88' | Report | Nakarin Thepaukson 75' | Stadium: Thunghong Municipality Stadium; Attendance: 479; Referee: Nikorn Khanthasorn; Assistant referees: Yothin Sukomud, Nattawut Tesmak; Fourth official: Ekkachai Juiwong |

| 7 March 2018 | Lamphun Warrior (T3) | 1 – 0 | Nakhon Sawan (T4) | Lamphun |
| 18:30 (UTC+7) | Nuttapol Srisamutr 26' | Report; Highlight | | Stadium: Mae-Guang Stadium; Attendance: 754; Referee: Suttipong Tepa; Assistant referees: Anucha Pin-amorn, Wiroj Uppachit; Fourth official: Suwat Wannakhan |

Lower region
The qualifying round will be played in regions featuring clubs from 2018 Thai League 4 Eastern Region, 2018 Thai League 4 Western Region, 2018 Thai League 4 Southern Region and 2018 Thai League 3 Lower Region.

| 7 March 2018 | Hatyai (T4) | 0 – 4 | Nakhon Pathom United (T4) | Songkhla |
| 15:30 (UTC+7) | | Report; Half-time Highlight; Full-time Highlight | Nattaphon Worasut 17', 51'; Phoutthasay Khochalern 60'; Teerayut Ngamlamai 90' | Stadium: Tinsulanon Stadium; Attendance: 300; Referee: Watcharin Nuthong; Assistant referees: Thanathat Thongpradit, Aris Mhadpanjor; Fourth official: Sombat Suwannarat |

| 7 March 2018 | Ranong United (T3) | 2 – 1 | Rajpracha (T3) | Ranong |
| 15:30 (UTC+7) | Jakkit Palapon 73'; Sanhanat Opawasu 90+3' (o.g.) | Report | Rewat Meerian 27' | Stadium: Hat Som Paen SAO. Stadium; Referee: Pisan Bentem-ahlee; Assistant referees: Prakij Damrongsuk, Narong Chaithong; Fourth official: Sanya Sathitdamrongkul |

| 7 March 2018 | Hatyai City (T4) | 0 – 1 | Trang (T3) | Songkhla |
| 15:30 (UTC+7) | | Report; Highlight | Douglas Lopes Carneiro 76' | Stadium: Na Thawi District Stadium; Attendance: 200; Referee: Pirot Bunkamnoed; Assistant referees: Wasan Namjaisuk, Suchat Fangmala; Fourth official: Sakda Jitsupaworakul |

| 7 March 2018 | Pluakdaeng Rayong United (T4) | 1 – 2 | IPE Samut Sakhon United (T4) | Rayong |
| 18:00 (UTC+7) | Worawut Jantapho 25' | Report | Farshid Alizadeh 54', 74' | Stadium: Rayong Provincial Stadium; Attendance: 480; Referee: Chayanan Thuto; Assistant referees: Montree Suripol, Sarawut Poltham; Fourth official: Ekkachai Pechcham |

=== Qualification play-off round ===
The qualification play-off round will be featured by eleven clubs which were the winners of second qualification round, three clubs which were the winners of first qualification round that advanced to this round automatically by drawing, and fourteen clubs from 2018 Thai League 2. Qualification play-off round had drawn on 27 March 2018 by FA Thailand.

| 18 April 2018 | Surin Sugar Khong Chee Mool (T4) | 2 – 2 (a.e.t.) (3 – 5 p) | Samut Sakhon (T2) | Surin |
| 15:30 (UTC+7) | Wisitsak Bunsawas 11', 90+4' | Report; Highlight | Sarawut Thongkot 50'; Valci Júnior 86' (pen.) | Stadium: Sri Narong Stadium; Attendance: 249; Referee: Nopparat Kaewsawang; Assistant referees: Arin Promthep, Narong Hanseuk; Fourth official: Tawatchai Ngampod |
| | Penalties |
| | Pathomkan Tanngam (penalty scored); Chakrid Suayroop (penalty missed); Apiwat Chuenban (penalty scored); Wisitsak Bunsawas (penalty scored) | | (penalty scored) Valci Júnior; (penalty scored) Suphachai Manjitt; (penalty scored) Wirat Nakpan; (penalty scored) Sarawut Thongkot; (penalty scored) Phisan Saowadee |

| 18 April 2018 | Bangkok (T3) | 1 – 2 | Lampang (T2) | Nonthaburi |
| 15:30 (UTC+7) | Poramet Arjvirai 75' | Report; Highlight | Tiago Chulapa 39', 55' | Stadium: SCG Muangthong United Training Stadium; Attendance: 114; Referee: Boonsong Prachumrak; Assistant referees: Veerachai Kamwirat, Satsampan Kensrakoo; Fourth official: Withee Phaneukdee |

| 18 April 2018 | Nan (T4) | 1 – 3 | Trat (T2) | Nan |
| 15:30 (UTC+7) | Saravut Maiwong 54' | Report | Barros Tardeli 25'; Wanit Jaisaen 69'; Sirisak Masbu-ngor 90+2' | Stadium: Nan PAO. Stadium; Attendance: 180; Referee: Peerasan Krataithong; Assistant referees: Narong Chaithong, Anucha Pin-amorn; Fourth official: Nikorn Khanthasorn |

| 18 April 2018 | IPE Samut Sakhon United (T4) | 1 – 2 | Krabi (T2) | Samut Sakhon |
| 15:30 (UTC+7) | Almamy Sylla 87' | Report | Supot Jodjam 22'; Isaac Mbengan 45' | Stadium: IPE Samut Sakhon Stadium; Attendance: 150; Referee: Anusorn Nukaew; Assistant referees: Damrongchai Cheuncharoen, Pradit Khukhankhet; Fourth official: Noppadet Muangngam |

| 18 April 2018 | Ranong United (T3) | 2 – 1 | Thai Honda (T2) | Ranong |
| 15:30 (UTC+7) | Burnel Okana-Stazi 3', 10' | Report | Teerawut Wongton 39' | Stadium: Hat Som Paen SAO. Stadium; Attendance: 200; Referee: Anuwat Feemuechang; Assistant referees: Sompong Kongthong, Hanyos Buangrab; Fourth official: Sombat Suwannarat |

| 18 April 2018 | Sakon Nakhon (T4) | 0 – 5 | Rayong (T2) | Sakon Nakhon |
| 15:30 (UTC+7) | | Report | Andre Houma 7', 55'; Krissana Nontharak 34', 46'; Wittawin Atthapratyamuang 69' | Stadium: Sakon Nakhon Provincial Stadium; Attendance: 76; Referee: Pongpat Kaewbaworn; Assistant referees: Pongsira Puangket, Prakasit Chansawang; Fourth official: Teeramet Phuprang |

| 18 April 2018 | Hua Hin City (T4) | 0 – 3 | Sisaket (T2) | Prachuap Khiri Khan |
| 17:30 (UTC+7) | | Report; Highlight | Chatri Rattanawong 27'; Watcharin Nuengprakaew 63'; Tatree Seeha 69' | Stadium: Khao Takiap Stadium; Attendance: 200; Referee: Peerathat Kittikanmetee; Assistant referees: Winai Charoenpong, Banpot Kunhong; Fourth official: Suntorn Pojai |

| 18 April 2018 | Nakhon Pathom United (T4) | 0 – 0 (a.e.t.) (5 – 4 p) | Chiangmai (T2) | Nakhon Pathom |
| 18:00 (UTC+7) | | Report | | Stadium: Nakhon Pathom Municipality Sport School Stadium; Attendance: 1,112; Referee: Makha Lerttanya; Assistant referees: Chaiyos Sripak, Chaiyan Sattayapong; Fourth official: Chayapon Laosuphan |
| | Penalties |
| | Teerayut Ngamlamai (penalty scored); Phoutthasay Khochalern (penalty scored); Lesley Ablorh (penalty scored); Raungchai Choothongchai (penalty scored); Olveira Silva Diego (penalty scored) | | (penalty scored) Luis Verdini; (penalty scored) Chayanon Khamkan; (penalty scored) Krissadee Prakobkong; (penalty missed) Surawich Logarwit; (penalty scored) Thanawich Kamna |

| 18 April 2018 | Phrae United (T3) | 2 – 3 | Khon Kaen (T2) | Phrae |
| 18:00 (UTC+7) | Suriyong Phetharn 17' (pen.); Thiago Elias 71' | Report | Chatchai Jiakklang 14', 37'; Siwapong Jarernsin 89' (pen.) | Stadium: Thunghong Municipality Stadium; Attendance: 433; Referee: Pathompong Eawjaroen; Assistant referees: Anon Ditkhuntod, Sarawut Tawiya; Fourth official: Sutipong Tepa |

| 18 April 2018 | Chiangrai City (T3) | 0 – 0 (a.e.t.) (3 – 4 p) | Army United (T2) | Chiangrai |
| 18:00 (UTC+7) | | Report; Highlight | | Stadium: Singha Stadium; Attendance: 133; Referee: Sanook Sungkaw; Assistant referees: Pramot Bun-in, Tawatchai Buadee; Fourth official: Suwat Wannakhan |
| | Penalties |
| | Raphael Diniz (penalty scored); Jetsada Supharit (penalty scored); Warawut Motim (penalty missed); Phitchanon Chanluang (penalty scored); Kang Min-gu (penalty missed) | | (penalty scored) Anmar Almubaraki; (penalty scored) Rittiporn Whanchuen; (penalty scored) Tanapol Udomlap; (penalty scored) Wasan Samansin |

| 18 April 2018 | Lamphun Warrior (T3) | 1 – 3 (a.e.t.) | Kasetsart (T2) | Lamphun |
| 18:00 (UTC+7) | Ekachai Pitsanu 83' | Report; Highlight | Tanaset Jintapaputanasiri 69', 92'; Kayne Vincent 117' | Stadium: Mae-Guang Stadium; Attendance: 647; Referee: Atthapon Pan-aum; Assistant referees: Waranyu Chomkosol, Saris Thongpong; Fourth official: Sakda Jitsupaworakul |

| 18 April 2018 | Trang (T3) | 2 – 0 | PTT Rayong (T2) | Trang |
| 18:00 (UTC+7) | Tetsuro Inoue 22'; Douglas Lopes Carneiro 31' | Report; Highlight | | Stadium: Trang Municipality Stadium; Attendance: 800; Referee: Pisan Bentem-ahlee; Assistant referees: Sathit Kaewsri, Masuelan Makatung; Fourth official: Sanya Sathitdamrongkul |

| 18 April 2018 | Surat Thani (T3) | 1 – 2 | Udon Thani (T2) | Surat Thani |
| 18:00 (UTC+7) | Vinicius Silva Freitas 45' | Report; Highlight | Chatchai Sangdao 3'; Satja Sangsuwan 45+3' | Stadium: Surat Thani Provincial Stadium; Attendance: 320; Referee: Pirot Bunkamnoed; Assistant referees: Permsak Saisuwan, Srisuwan Boonnam; Fourth official: Yod Kamhai |

| 18 April 2018 | Ayutthaya United (T3) | 1 – 5 | Nongbua Pitchaya (T2) | Ayutthaya |
| 18:30 (UTC+7) | Sittichai Traisil 44' | Report; Highlight | Sarawut Sintupun 14'; Gabriel Davis 32'; Apisit Khamwang 45+2'; Weerayut Sriwichai 57'; Anucha Suksai 85' | Stadium: Ayutthaya Provincial Stadium; Attendance: 830; Referee: Kotchapum Meesridecha; Assistant referees: Narin Wongprapaipak, Jomthong Vaewvab; Fourth official: Chaiwat Boonsong |

=== First round ===
The first round will be featured by fourteen clubs which were the winners of the qualification play-off round; including eleven clubs from T2, two clubs from T3, and one club from T4 and eighteen clubs from 2018 Thai League. First round had drawn on 22 May 2018 by FA Thailand.

| 13 June 2018 | Ranong United (T3) | 2 – 2 (a.e.t.) (5 – 4 p) | Ratchaburi Mitr Phol (T1) | Ranong |
| 16:30 (UTC+7) | Yaseen Harnjit 28', 64' | Report; Half-time Highlight; Full-time Highlight | Kang Soo-il 5'; Montree Promsawat 55' | Stadium: Ranong Provincial Stadium; Attendance: 1,000; Referee: Sivakorn Pu-udom; Assistant referees: Kanchit Nittayachat, Teerapol Sanyapleum; Fourth official: Pairoj Bunkamnerd |
| | Penalties |
| | Armand Mefiré Njikam (penalty scored); Akkarin Pittaso (penalty scored); Adam U-seng (penalty scored); Kittiphong Buathong (penalty scored); Burnel Okana-Stazi (penalty missed); Teerawat Sangworajit (penalty scored) | | (penalty missed) Prathum Chuthong; (penalty scored) Sila Srikampang; (penalty scored) Pathomchai Sueasakul; (penalty scored) Kang Soo-il; (penalty scored) Sompong Soleb; (penalty missed) Chutipol Thongthae |

| 13 June 2018 | Krabi (T2) | 1 – 2 | Police Tero (T1) | Krabi |
| 18:00 (UTC+7) | Supot Jodjam 87' | Report; Highlight | Adisak Srikumpang 38'; Michaël N'dri 84' | Stadium: Krabi Provincial Stadium; Attendance: 704; Referee: Wiwat Jampa-on; Assistant referees: Komsan Kamphaen, Komchalat Lekhawijit; Fourth official: Paisan Bendem-arlee |

| 13 June 2018 | Trat (T2) | 0 – 2 | Bangkok Glass (T1) | Trat |
| 18:00 (UTC+7) | | Report; Highlight | Anon Amornlertsak 67'; Chatree Chimtalay 72' | Stadium: Trat Provincial Stadium; Attendance: 1,407; Referee: Noppadech Muang-ngam; Assistant referees: Pariwat Phoyoo, Arin Promthep; Fourth official: Thawatchai Ngampod |

| 13 June 2018 | Samut Sakhon (T2) | 0 – 5 | Bangkok United (T1) | Samut Sakhon |
| 18:00 (UTC+7) | | Report; Highlight | Teeratep Winothai 5' (pen.); Sittichok Kannoo 16'; Jakkapan Pornsai 75', 82'; Nattawut Suksum 81' | Stadium: Samut Sakhon Provincial Stadium; Attendance: 825; Referee: Torpong Somsing; Assistant referees: Binlha Preeda, Wiroj Lorkam; Fourth official: Dusit Aiamsakul |

| 13 June 2018 | PT Prachuap (T1) | 1 – 1 (a.e.t.) (4 – 5 p) | Suphanburi (T1) | Prachuap Khiri Khan |
| 18:00 (UTC+7) | Lonsana Doumbouya 84' | Report; Highlight | Meechok Marhasaranukun 2' | Stadium: Sam Ao Stadium; Attendance: 2,152; Referee: Chairoek Ngamsom; Assistant referees: Sumet Piasiri, Pramot Bun-in; Fourth official: Chaiwat Bunsong |
| | Penalties |
| | Jonatan Ferreira Reis (penalty scored); Decha Sa-ardchom (penalty missed); Somphop Ninvong (penalty scored); Kritsananon Srisuwan (penalty scored); Lonsana Doumbouya (penalty scored) | | (penalty scored) Meechok Marhasaranukun; (penalty scored) Tinnakorn Asurin; (penalty scored) Tanasith Siripala; (penalty scored) Kannarin Thawornsak; (penalty scored) Chananan Pombuppha |

| 13 June 2018 | Kasetsart (T2) | 3 – 4 | Air Force Central (T1) | Bangkok |
| 18:00 (UTC+7) | Tanaset Jintapaputanasiri 45+2'; Oliveira Alves Diego 69', 77' | Report | Greg Houla 2', 10'; Ekkapoom Potharungroj 68', 90+2' | Stadium: TOT Stadium, Chaeng Watthana; Attendance: 327; Referee: Songkran Boonmeekiat; Assistant referees: Rawut Nakrit, Ruangsak Noopheuk; Fourth official: Pansa Chaisanit |

| 13 June 2018 | Sisaket (T2) | 0 – 3 | Nakhon Ratchasima Mazda (T1) | Sisaket |
| 18:00 (UTC+7) | | Report; Highlight | Phaitoon Nontadee 44'; Leandro Assumpção 72', 75' | Stadium: Sri Nakhon Lamduan Stadium; Attendance: 651; Referee: Chayapon Laosupan; Assistant referees: Wattana Chonchanakul, Udon Aneksak; Fourth official: Kritsada Luangyos |

| 13 June 2018 | Trang (T3) | 2 – 1 | Chainat Hornbill (T1) | Trang |
| 18:00 (UTC+7) | Douglas Lopes Carneiro 78'; Ricardo Theodoro de Almeida Soares 84' (pen.) | Report; Highlight | Chatchai Koomphaya 75' | Stadium: Trang Municipality Stadium; Attendance: 1,462; Referee: Jirayut Kasiphol; Assistant referees: Chaowalit Poonprasit, Narin Wongprapaipak; Fourth official: Pongpat Kaewbaworn |

| 13 June 2018 | Khon Kaen (T2) | 1 – 2 | Chonburi (T1) | Khon Kaen |
| 18:00 (UTC+7) | Yuttana Ruangsuksut 50' | Report; Highlight | Marclei Santos 8'; Kritsada Kaman 78' | Stadium: Khon Kaen PAO. Stadium; Attendance: 4,464; Referee: Natee Choosuwan; Assistant referees: Wichet Ketkaew, Tassanai Sarobon; Fourth official: Krittachai Saenmat |

| 13 June 2018 | Nakhon Pathom United (T4) | 1 – 0 | Navy (T1) | Nakhon Pathom |
| 19:00 (UTC+7) | Raungchai Choothongchai 78' | Report; Highlight | | Stadium: Nakhon Pathom Municipality Sport School Stadium; Attendance: 1,287; Referee: Anusorn Nookaew; Assistant referees: Pattarapong Kijsathit, Worapong Prasertsri; Fourth official: Arkom Charoensuk |

| 13 June 2018 | Rayong (T2) | 1 – 1 (a.e.t.) (2 – 4 p) | Pattaya United (T1) | Rayong |
| 19:00 (UTC+7) | Seiya Sugishita 68' | Report; Highlight | Yuwarat Damsungnoen 21' (o.g.) | Stadium: Rayong Provincial Stadium; Attendance: 341; Referee: Warintorn Sasadee; Assistant referees: Phubet Lekpha, Srisuwan Bunnam; Fourth official: Atiwat Seelalo |
| | Penalties |
| | Alongkon Chonnathong (penalty scored); Seiya Sugishita (penalty missed); Wasusiwakit Phusirit (penalty scored); Pascal Millien (penalty missed) | | (penalty scored) Lukian; (penalty scored) Nopparat Sakun-ood; (penalty scored) Suphanan Bureerat; (penalty scored) Sarawut Kanlayanabandit |

| 13 June 2018 | Nongbua Pitchaya (T2) | 3 – 4 (a.e.t.) | Ubon UMT United (T1) | Nongbua Lamphu |
| 19:00 (UTC+7) | Apisit Khamwang 38'; Jakkrawut Songma 90+2'; Yod Chanthawong 119' | Report; Highlight | Somsak Musikaphan 48', 96', 99'; Srđan Dimitrov 90+3' | Stadium: Nongbua Lamphu Provincial Stadium; Attendance: 1,626; Referee: Teetichai Nualchan; Assistant referees: Rachan Dawangpa, Banpot Kunhong; Fourth official: Wiwaet Sangnakhon |

| 13 June 2018 | Port (T1) | 4 – 3 | Sukhothai (T1) | Bangkok |
| 19:00 (UTC+7) | Dragan Bošković 9', 74' (pen.); Sergio Suárez 19'; Todsapol Lated 82' | Report; Highlight | Nelson Bonilla 37', 63'; Peemwit Thongnitiroj 54' | Stadium: PAT Stadium; Attendance: 2,457; Referee: Pathompong Aiawcharoen; Assistant referees: Kitisak Pikulngoen, Chotrawee Thongduang; Fourth official: Ekkachai Petcham |

| 13 June 2018 | Army United (T2) | 1 – 6 | Chiangrai United (T1) | Bangkok |
| 19:00 (UTC+7) | Tanakorn Dangthong 90+2' | Report; Highlight | Victor Cardozo 2'; Sarawut Inpaen 12'; Piyaphon Phanichakul 18'; Lee Yong-rae 43'; Bill 45+2', 72' (pen.) | Stadium: Thai Army Sports Stadium; Attendance: 955; Referee: Niwat Insa-ad; Assistant referees: Chaiya Sripak, Arisa Chansom; Fourth official: Sunita Thongthawin |

| 13 June 2018 | Udon Thani (T2) | 1 – 2 | SCG Muangthong United (T1) | Udon Thani |
| 19:00 (UTC+7) | Datsakorn Thonglao 42' | Report; Highlight | Adisorn Promrak 12'; Chenrop Samphaodi 20' | Stadium: IPE. Udon Thani Stadium; Attendance: 7,999; Referee: Wichet Thianthong; Assistant referees: Thanin Ruenchit, Sarayut Sri-ampai; Fourth official: Kotchaphum Meesridecha |

| 13 June 2018 | Lampang (T2) | 1 – 3 | Buriram United (T1) | Lampang |
| 19:00 (UTC+7) | Melvin de Leeuw 31' | Report; Highlight | Javier Patiño 5'; Sasalak Haiprakhon 51'; Supachok Sarachat 80' | Stadium: Lampang Provincial Stadium; Attendance: 5,097; Referee: Ketdamrong Khemthong; Assistant referees: Thanet Choochuen, Nualkij Donjangreed; Fourth official: Suntorn Porjai |

=== Second round ===
The second round will be featured by sixteen clubs which were the winners of the first round; including thirteen clubs from T1, two clubs from T3, and one club from T4. Second round had drawn on 19 June 2018 by FA Thailand.

| 11 July 2018 | Ranong United (T3) | 2 – 1 (a.e.t.) | Bangkok United (T1) | Ranong |
| 16:30 (UTC+7) | Burnel Okana-Stazi 74'; Kim Tae-woong 103' | Report; Highlight | Vander Luiz 2' | Stadium: Ranong Provincial Stadium; Attendance: 2,900; Referee: Pongpat Kaewbaworn; Assistant referees: Phubet Lekpha, Kanchit Nittayachat; Fourth official: Anuwat Feemuechang |

| 11 July 2018 | Trang (T3) | 0 – 1 (a.e.t.) | Buriram United (T1) | Trang |
| 18:00 (UTC+7) | | Report; Highlight | Diogo 116' | Stadium: Trang Municipality Stadium; Attendance: 6,132; Referee: Pairoj Bunkamnerd; Assistant referees: Thanet Choochuen, Thanin Ruenjit; Fourth official: Jirayut Kasiphol |

| 11 July 2018 | Ubon UMT United (T1) | 3 – 2 | Suphanburi (T1) | Ubon Ratchathani |
| 18:00 (UTC+7) | Kenta Yamazaki 6'; Niranrit Jarernsuk 21'; Kansit Premthanakul 51' | Report; Highlight | Kasidech Wattayawong 16'; Phattharaphon Kangsopa 60' | Stadium: UMT Stadium; Attendance: 1,003; Referee: Sivakorn Pu-udom; Assistant referees: Rachan Dawangpa, Chaiya Sripak; Fourth official: Kotchapoom Meesridecha |

| 11 July 2018 | Chonburi (T1) | 5 – 1 | SCG Muangthong United (T1) | Chonburi |
| 19:00 (UTC+7) | Matheus Alves 45', 57', 74'; Saharat Sontisawat 59'; Bajram Nebihi 89' | Report; Highlight | Célio Santos 29' | Stadium: Chonburi Stadium; Attendance: 4,633; Referee: Chairoek Ngamsom; Assistant referees: Komsan Kamphaen, Sumet Piasiri; Fourth official: Noppadech Muang-ngam |

| 11 July 2018 | Nakhon Pathom United (T4) | 0 – 1 | Bangkok Glass (T1) | Nakhon Pathom |
| 19:00 (UTC+7) | | Report; Highlight | Ariel Rodríguez 36' (pen.) | Stadium: Nakhon Pathom Municipality Sport School Stadium; Attendance: 1,767; Referee: Warintorn Sasadee; Assistant referees: Rawut Nakrit, Wiroj Lorkam; Fourth official: Pathompong Aiewcharoen |

| 11 July 2018 | Nakhon Ratchasima Mazda (T1) | 1 – 0 | Pattaya United (T1) | Nakhon Ratchasima |
| 19:00 (UTC+7) | Ekkachai Rittiphan 5' | Report; Highlight | | Stadium: 80th Birthday Stadium; Attendance: 1,313; Referee: Wichet Tianthong; Assistant referees: Watthana Chonchanakul, Wichet Ketkaew; Fourth official: Teetichai Nualchan |

| 11 July 2018 | Air Force Central (T1) | 1 – 0 | Port (T1) | Pathum Thani |
| 19:00 (UTC+7) | Ernesto Amantegui 88' | Report; Highlight | | Stadium: Thupatemi Stadium; Attendance: 1,221; Referee: Songkran Bunmeekiat; Assistant referees: Rachen Srichai, Chaowalit Poonprasit; Fourth official: Sunita Thongthawin |

| 11 July 2018 | Chiangrai United (T1) | 4 – 2 | Police Tero (T1) | Chiangrai |
| 19:00 (UTC+7) | William Henrique 15'; Bill 29', 70', 75' | Report; Highlight | Adisak Srikumpang 45+3'; Titawee Aksornsri 90+3' | Stadium: Singha Stadium; Attendance: 1,081; Referee: Natee Chusuwan; Assistant referees: Apichit Nopuan, Worapong Prasertsri; Fourth official: Wisawet Sangnakhon |

=== Quarter-finals ===
The quarter-finals round will be featured by eight clubs which were the winners of the second round; including seven clubs from T1 and one club from T3. Quarter-finals round had drawn on 17 July 2018 by FA Thailand.

| 8 August 2018 | Buriram United (T1) | 4 – 1 | Ubon UMT United (T1) | Buriram |
| 18:00 (UTC+7) | Javier Patiño 39'; Diogo 57', 62'; Supachok Sarachat 90' | Report; Highlight | Pansa Hemviboon 16' (o.g.) | Stadium: Chang Arena; Attendance: 7,669; Referee: Natee Chusuwan; Assistant referees: Wichet Ketkaew, Rachan Dawangpa; Fourth official: Arkom Jaroensuk |

| 8 August 2018 | Nakhon Ratchasima Mazda (T1) | 3 – 1 | Ranong United (T3) | Nakhon Ratchasima |
| 19:00 (UTC+7) | Chanatphon Sikkhamondol 26'; Lee Won-jae 63'; Shahrel Fikri 73' | Report; Highlight | Burnel Okana-Stazi 90+2' (pen.) | Stadium: 80th Birthday Stadium; Attendance: 1,788; Referee: Songkran Bunmeekiat; Assistant referees: Apichit Nopuan, Worapong Prasertsri; Fourth official: Wichet Thianthong |

| 8 August 2018 | Chonburi (T1) | 4 – 6 (a.e.t.) | Bangkok Glass (T1) | Chonburi |
| 19:00 (UTC+7) | Worachit Kanitsribampen 6', 10', 85' (pen.); Ciro 73' | Report; Highlight | Anon Amornlertsak 1'; Ariel Rodríguez 76'; Chatree Chimtalay 77', 90+4'; David Bala 98'; Surachat Sareepim 119' | Stadium: Chonburi Stadium; Attendance: 3,245; Referee: Niwat Insa-ard; Assistant referees: Poonsawat Samransuk, Kitisak Pikulngoen; Fourth official: Pathomphong Aiewjaroen |

| 8 August 2018 | Chiangrai United (T1) | 1 – 0 | Air Force Central (T1) | Chiangrai |
| 19:00 (UTC+7) | Siwakorn Tiatrakul 69' | Report; Highlight | | Stadium: Singha Stadium; Attendance: 1,158; Referee: Chairoek Ngamsom; Assistant referees: Komsan Kamphaen, Binlha Preeda; Fourth official: Warintorn Sasadee |

=== Semi-finals ===
The semi-finals round will be featured by four clubs which were the winners of the quarter-finals round; all are the clubs from T1. Semi-finals round had drawn on 14 August 2018 by FA Thailand.

| 19 September 2018 | Nakhon Ratchasima Mazda (T1) | 1 – 1 (a.e.t.) (1 – 3 p) | Chiangrai United (T1) | Bangkok |
| 19:00 (UTC+7) | Leandro Assumpção 73' (pen.) | Report; Highlight | Chaiyawat Buran 11' | Stadium: Supachalasai Stadium; Attendance: 3,546; Referee: Chairoek Ngamsom; Assistant referees: Komsan Kamphaen, Poonsawad Samransuk; Fourth official: Teetichai Nualchan |
| | Penalties |
| | Antonio Pina (penalty scored); Shahrel Fikri (penalty missed); Jakkit Niyomsuk (penalty missed); Chanatphon Sikkhamondol (penalty missed) | | (penalty missed) Bill; (penalty scored) Phitiwat Sukjitthammakul; (penalty scored) Victor Cardozo; (penalty scored) Akarawin Sawasdee |

| 19 September 2018 | Buriram United (T1) | 1 – 2 | Bangkok Glass (T1) | Bangkok |
| 19:00 (UTC+7) | Diogo 18' (pen.) | Report; Highlight | Surachat Sareepim 12'; David Bala 84' | Stadium: Boonyachinda Stadium; Attendance: 3,012; Referee: Sivakorn Pu-udom; Assistant referees: Thanet Chuchuen, Apichit Nopuan; Fourth official: Torpong Somsing |

=== Final ===
The final round will be featured by two clubs which were the winners of the semi-finals round; both are the clubs from T1. It was played at the Thammasat Stadium in Pathum Thani, Thailand on 20 October 2018.

| 20 October 2018 | Chiangrai United (T1) | 1 – 0 | Bangkok Glass (T1) | Pathum Thani |
| 20:15 (UTC+7) | William Henrique 65' | Report; Highlight | | Stadium: Thammasat Stadium; Attendance: 14,380; Referee: Chairoek Ngamsom; Assistant referees: Rachen Srichai, Komsan Kamphaen; Fourth official: Wiwat Jumpa-on |

== Top goalscorers ==
As of 20 October 2018 from official website.

| Rank | Player | Club | Goals |
|---|---|---|---|
| 1 | (Brazil) Bill | Chiangrai United | 5 |
| 1 | (Republic of the Congo) Burnel Okana | Ranong United | 5 |
| 3 | (Brazil) Diogo | Buriram United | 4 |
| 3 | (Thailand) Wisitsak Boonsawat | Surin Sugar Khong Chee Mool | 4 |
| 5 | (Thailand) Chatree Chimtalay | Bangkok Glass | 3 |
| 5 | (Brazil) Leandro Assumpção | Nakhon Ratchasima Mazda | 3 |
| 5 | (Thailand) Somsak Musikaphan | Ubon UMT United | 3 |
| 5 | (Brazil) Matheus Alves | Chonburi | 3 |
| 5 | (Thailand) Worachit Kanitsribampen | Chonburi | 3 |
| 5 | (Brazil) Douglas Lopes Carneiro | Trang | 3 |
| 5 | (Thailand) Tanaset Jintapaputanasiri | Kasetsart | 3 |
| 5 | (Cameroon) Dominique Nyamsi Jacques | Chachoengsao Hi-Tek | 3 |

== See also ==
- 2018 Thai League 1
- 2018 Thai League 3
- 2018 Thai League 4
- 2018 Thailand Amateur League
- 2018 Thai FA Cup
- 2018 Thai League Cup
- 2018 Thailand Champions Cup
