= 2022–23 Thai League 3 Southern Region =

Thai League 3 Southern Region
- Season: 2022–23
- Dates: 10 September 2022 – 19 March 2023
- Champions: Songkhla
- Relegated: Mueang Kon D United
- T3 National Championship: Songkhla; MH Nakhon Si City
- Matches: 132
- Goals: 347 (2.63 per match)
- Top goalscorer: (Brazil) Jardel (18 goals; Songkhla)
- Best goalkeeper: (Thailand) Suntiparp Boonlkilang (11 clean sheets; Songkhla)
- Biggest home win: 7 goals difference Young Singh Hatyai United 7–0 Trang (12 February 2023)
- Biggest away win: 5 goals difference Trang 2–7 Pattani (8 January 2023)
- Highest scoring: 9 goals Trang 2–7 Pattani (8 January 2023)
- Longest winning run: 8 matches Songkhla
- Longest unbeaten run: 13 matches Songkhla
- Longest winless run: 12 matches Jalor City; Trang
- Longest losing run: 9 matches Trang
- Highest attendance: 6,500; Pattani 2–1 Nara United (24 September 2022)
- Lowest attendance: 63; Songkhla 5–1 Muang Trang United (7 January 2023)
- Total attendance: 82,974
- Average attendance: 675

The 2022–23 Thai League 3 Southern region is a region in the regional stage of the 2022–23 Thai League 3. The tournament was sponsored by Kongsalak Plus, and known as the Kongsalak Plus League for sponsorship purposes. A total of 12 teams located in Southern of Thailand will compete in the league of the Southern region.

== Teams ==
=== Number of teams by province ===
Position	Province	Number	Teams
1	Songkhla	2	Songkhla and Young Singh Hatyai United
1	Surat Thani	2	Mueang Kon D United and Wiang Sa Surat Thani City
1	Trang	2	Muang Trang United and Trang
4	Nakhon Si Thammarat	1	MH Nakhon Si City
4	Narathiwat	1	Nara United
4	Pattani	1	Pattani
4	Phatthalung	1	Phatthalung
4	Phuket	1	Phuket Andaman
4	Yala	1	Jalor City

=== Stadiums and locations ===
Locations of the 2022–23 Thai League 3 Southern region teams

Team	Location	Stadium	Coordinates
Jalor City	Yala (Mueang)	Stadium of Thailand National Sports University, Yala Campus	6°33′09″N 101°17′31″E
MH Nakhon Si City	Nakhon Si Thammarat (Tha Sala)	Stadium of Walailak University	8°38′59″N 99°52′44″E
Muang Trang United	Trang (Mueang)	Trang Municipality Stadium	7°33′12″N 99°36′57″E
Mueang Kon D United	Surat Thani (Mueang)	Surat Thani Provincial Stadium	9°08′06″N 99°20′50″E
Nara United	Narathiwat (Mueang)	Narathiwat PAO. Stadium	6°25′39″N 101°48′15″E
Pattani	Pattani (Mueang)	Pattani Provincial Stadium	6°53′20″N 101°14′41″E
Phatthalung	Phatthalung (Mueang)	Phatthalung Provincial Stadium	7°37′00″N 100°02′55″E
Phuket Andaman	Phuket (Mueang)	Surakul Stadium	7°53′20″N 98°22′19″E
Songkhla	Songkhla (Mueang)	Tinsulanon Stadium	7°12′26″N 100°35′55″E
Trang	Trang (Mueang)	Trang Municipality Stadium	7°33′12″N 99°36′57″E
Wiang Sa Surat Thani City	Surat Thani (Wiang Sa)	Ban Song Municipality Stadium	8°39′43″N 99°22′32″E
Young Singh Hatyai United	Songkhla (Hatyai)	Chira Nakhon Stadium	7°01′13″N 100°28′19″E

=== Foreign players ===
A T3 team could register 3 foreign players from foreign players all around the world. A team can use 3 foreign players on the field in each game.

Note :
(substituted off) : players who released during second leg transfer window;
(substituted in) : players who registered during second leg transfer window.

AFC member countries players.
CAF member countries players.
CONCACAF member countries players.
CONMEBOL member countries players.
OFC member countries players.
UEFA member countries players.
No foreign player registered.

Club	Leg	Player 1	Player 2	Player 3
Jalor City	1st
Jalor City	2nd
MH Nakhon Si City	1st	(Brazil) André Luís	(Ivory Coast) Boubacar Koné	(Japan) Ryo Tomigahara
MH Nakhon Si City	2nd	(Brazil) André Luís	(Ivory Coast) Boubacar Koné	(Japan) Ryo Tomigahara
Muang Trang United	1st		(Japan) Takeshi Miki (substituted off)	(Brazil) Alek Luis da Costa Ruela
Muang Trang United	2nd	(Iran) Chajouei Mahdi Mohammad (substituted in)	(Myanmar) Nyein Chan Aung (substituted in)	(Brazil) Alek Luis da Costa Ruela
Mueang Kon D United	1st	(Iran) Afrough Ali Shirmohammad (substituted off)	(Ivory Coast) Oumar Sanou (substituted off)
Mueang Kon D United	2nd		(Togo) Vincent Bossou (substituted in)
Nara United	1st	(Algeria) Bouchiba Chiheb Ennour (substituted off)	(Argentina) Juan Francisco Odorisio	(Japan) Ryohei Maeda
Nara United	2nd	(Cameroon) Moussa Abakar (substituted in)	(Argentina) Juan Francisco Odorisio	(Japan) Ryohei Maeda
Pattani	1st	(Iran) Chajouei Mahdi Mohammad (substituted off)	(Iran) Hamed Bakhtiari (substituted off)	(Egypt) Waleed Adel
Pattani	2nd	(Brazil) Hedipo (substituted in)	(Republic of the Congo) Burnel Okana-Stazi (substituted in)	(Egypt) Waleed Adel
Phatthalung	1st	(Argentina) Leonardo Martín Ferrari (substituted off)	(Ivory Coast) Alimamy Haïdara Chérif (substituted off)	(Madagascar) Guy Hubert
Phatthalung	2nd	(Georgia (country)) Guram Shetsiruli (substituted in)	(Georgia (country)) Lasha Tsitsvidze (substituted in)	(Madagascar) Guy Hubert
Phuket Andaman	1st		(Canada) Andrew David Symons (substituted off)	(Guinea) Sory Diane
Phuket Andaman	2nd	(Brazil) Marcelo da Conceição do Nascimento (substituted in)	(Brazil) Jefferson Mateus Quirino Rodrigues (substituted in)	(Guinea) Sory Diane
Songkhla	1st	(Brazil) Douglas Cobo	(Brazil) Felipe Nunes	(Brazil) Jardel
Songkhla	2nd	(Brazil) Douglas Cobo	(Brazil) Felipe Nunes	(Brazil) Jardel
Trang	1st	(Morocco) Jaouad Afri (substituted off)	(Japan) Yushi Kawaguchi (substituted off)	(South Korea) Han Youn-soo
Trang	2nd			(South Korea) Han Youn-soo
Wiang Sa Surat Thani City	1st		(Mali) Toloba Aremu Kassim Mouyidine	(Japan) Hideto Ozaki
Wiang Sa Surat Thani City	2nd	(Brazil) Marcos Wilder da Silva Santos (substituted in)	(Mali) Toloba Aremu Kassim Mouyidine	(Japan) Hideto Ozaki
Young Singh Hatyai United	1st	(Republic of the Congo) Burnel Okana-Stazi (substituted off)	(Togo) Ekue Andre Houma (substituted off)	(Laos) Mitsada Saitaifah (substituted off)
Young Singh Hatyai United	2nd		(Brazil) Fellipe Cabral Veloso dos Santos (substituted in)	(Iran) Amir Mohammad Karamdar (substituted in)

== League table ==
=== Standings ===
Pos	Team	Pld	W	D	L	GF	GA	GD	Pts	Qualification or relegation
1	Songkhla (C, Q)	22	16	5	1	46	10	+36	53	Qualification to the National Championship stage
2	MH Nakhon Si City (Q)	22	13	3	6	47	22	+25	42	Qualification to the National Championship stage
3	Young Singh Hatyai United (R)	22	10	6	6	40	22	+18	36 (Note: Young Singh Hatyai United on the head-to-head points record; Young Singh Hatyai United 4 pts, Pattani 1 pt.)	Relegation to the Thailand Semi-Pro League
4	Pattani	22	10	6	6	34	27	+7	36	
5	Nara United	22	9	6	7	30	27	+3	33	
6	Phuket Andaman	22	8	6	8	26	30	−4	30	
7	Muang Trang United	22	7	7	8	23	28	−5	28	
8	Wiang Sa Surat Thani City	22	6	7	9	24	28	−4	25	
9	Phatthalung	22	5	9	8	24	33	−9	24	
10	Jalor City	22	4	9	9	15	24	−9	21 (Note: Jalor City is ahead on the head-to-head record; Jalor City 3 pts (GD +1), Trang 3 pts (GD -1).)	
11	Trang	22	6	3	13	25	54	−29	21	
12	Mueang Kon D United (R)	22	2	5	15	13	42	−29	11	Relegation to the Thailand Semi-Pro League

Source: Thai League
Rules for classification: 1) Points; 2) Head-to-head points; 3) Head-to-head goal difference; 4) Head-to-head goal scored; 5) Overall goal difference; 6) Overall goal scored; 7) Fair play points; 8) Play-off without extra time).
(C) Champions; (Q) Qualified for the phase indicated; (R) Relegated

=== Positions by round ===
Team ╲ Round	1	2	3	4	5	6	7	8	9	10	11	12	13	14	15	16	17	18	19	20	21	22
Songkhla	2	1	1	1	1	1	1	1	1	1	1	1	1	1	1	1	1	1	1	1	1	1
MH Nakhon Si City	1	2	6	8	5	4	3	5	5	5	7	6	3	4	4	3	4	3	3	2	2	2
Young Singh Hatyai United	8	4	3	2	2	3	5	4	4	3	4	4	6	6	7	7	6	6	4	4	4	3
Pattani	7	9	5	7	8	8	6	7	7	8	6	5	2	2	2	2	2	2	2	3	3	4
Nara United	6	8	9	6	4	6	4	3	2	4	2	2	4	3	3	4	5	4	5	5	5	5
Phuket Andaman	3	5	7	4	6	5	7	6	6	6	8	7	7	7	5	5	3	5	6	6	6	6
Muang Trang United	10	11	8	9	9	9	9	9	9	9	9	10	9	9	9	9	9	9	7	7	7	7
Wiang Sa Surat Thani City	11	6	4	5	7	7	8	8	8	7	5	8	8	8	8	8	7	7	9	9	8	8
Phatthalung	12	12	12	11	11	10	10	10	10	10	10	9	10	10	10	10	10	10	8	8	9	9
Jalor City	9	10	11	12	12	12	12	11	11	11	11	11	11	11	11	11	11	11	11	11	11	10
Trang	4	3	2	3	3	2	2	2	3	2	3	3	5	5	6	6	8	8	10	10	10	11
Mueang Kon D United	5	7	10	10	10	11	11	12	12	12	12	12	12	12	12	12	12	12	12	12	12	12

Source: Thai League
= Qualification to the National Championship stage; = Relegation to the Thailand Amateur League

=== Results by round ===
Team ╲ Round	1	2	3	4	5	6	7	8	9	10	11	12	13	14	15	16	17	18	19	20	21	22
Songkhla	W	W	D	W	W	D	W	W	L	W	D	W	W	W	W	W	W	W	W	D	W	D
MH Nakhon Si City	W	D	L	L	W	W	W	L	D	D	L	W	W	L	W	W	L	W	W	W	W	W
Young Singh Hatyai United	D	W	W	L	W	D	L	W	D	W	D	L	L	D	L	L	W	W	W	W	D	W
Pattani	D	D	W	L	D	D	W	L	W	L	W	W	W	W	W	W	L	D	W	D	L	L
Nara United	D	D	L	W	W	D	W	W	W	L	W	L	L	W	D	L	D	W	L	L	D	W
Phuket Andaman	W	L	D	W	L	W	L	W	D	D	L	W	L	D	W	W	W	D	L	L	D	L
Muang Trang United	L	L	W	D	D	L	L	W	L	W	D	L	W	D	L	W	D	L	W	D	D	W
Wiang Sa Surat Thani City	L	W	W	D	L	D	D	L	W	D	W	L	L	D	W	L	D	L	L	L	W	D
Phatthalung	L	L	L	W	L	D	D	D	D	L	W	W	D	L	L	W	D	D	W	D	D	L
Jalor City	L	D	L	D	L	L	L	D	D	D	D	L	W	D	D	L	W	D	L	W	L	W
Trang	W	D	W	L	W	W	W	L	D	W	L	L	D	L	L	L	L	L	L	L	L	L
Mueang Kon D United	D	D	L	D	L	L	L	L	L	L	L	W	L	D	L	L	L	L	L	W	D	L

Source: Thai League
W = Won; D = Drawn; L = Lost

=== Results ===
Home \ Away	JLC	MNS	MTG	MKD	NRA	PTN	PLG	PKA	SKA	TRG	WSC	YHU
Jalor City	—	0–1	1–1	1–1	1–2	2–0	1–1	1–0	1–1	2–0	0–2	2–2
MH Nakhon Si City	2–0	—	2–1	1–0	6–1	3–0	4–1	4–0	1–2	6–0	2–2	3–1
Muang Trang United	1–1	2–1	—	2–0	0–0	1–2	4–1	2–1	0–2	0–2	1–0	1–1
Mueang Kon D United	1–0	0–3	0–1	—	1–1	1–2	0–0	2–3	0–3	0–2	0–0	0–1
Nara United	0–0	1–1	1–0	5–0	—	0–1	0–0	5–0	2–1	2–1	1–0	0–1
Pattani	1–0	2–1	1–1	3–1	2–1	—	3–0	1–1	0–0	1–1	2–0	1–2
Phatthalung	0–0	1–2	1–1	3–0	2–0	5–3	—	2–2	1–2	2–2	1–1	0–1
Phuket Andaman	0–0	1–0	1–0	2–0	1–1	2–1	0–1	—	0–2	3–0	2–0	4–3
Songkhla	1–0	3–1	5–1	2–0	4–0	2–0	3–0	1–1	—	4–1	2–0	2–1
Trang	1–0	1–1	1–2	1–3	2–3	2–7	3–0	1–0	0–4	—	1–3	2–1
Wiang Sa Surat Thani City	1–2	0–2	3–0	2–2	1–3	1–1	1–1	2–1	0–0	3–1	—	2–0
Young Singh Hatyai United	5–0	3–0	1–1	4–1	2–1	0–0	0–1	1–1	0–0	7–0	3–0	—

Source: Thai League
Legend: Blue = home team win; Yellow = draw; Red = away team win.
For upcoming matches, an "a" indicates there is an article about the rivalry between the two participants.

== Season statistics ==
=== Top scorers ===
As of 19 March 2023.

Rank	Player	Club	Goals
1	(Brazil) Jardel	Songkhla	18
2	(Republic of the Congo) Burnel Okana-Stazi	Young Singh Hatyai United (9), Pattani (6)	15
3	(Brazil) André Luís	MH Nakhon Si City	13
4	(Thailand) Somsak Musikaphan	MH Nakhon Si City	9
5	(Thailand) Yodwong Misen	Phuket Andaman	8
6	(Thailand) Pithak Abdulrahman	Pattani	7
6	(Thailand) Sihanart Suttisak	Songkhla	7
6	(Brazil) Fellipe Cabral Veloso dos Santos	Young Singh Hatyai United	7

=== Hat-tricks ===
Player	For	Against	Result	Date
(Thailand) Yod Chanthawong	Songkhla	Muang Trang United	5–1 (H)	7 January 2023
(Thailand) Pithak Abdulrahman	Pattani	Trang	7–2 (A)	8 January 2023
(Brazil) André Luís	MH Nakhon Si City	Nara United	6–1 (H)	8 January 2023
(Brazil) Fellipe Cabral Veloso dos Santos	Young Singh Hatyai United	Jalor City	5–0 (H)	26 February 2023

Notes: (H) = Home team; (A) = Away team

=== Clean sheets ===
As of 19 March 2023.

Rank	Player	Club	Clean sheets
1	(Thailand) Suntiparp Boonlkilang	Songkhla	11
2	(Thailand) Phithakphong Chanoum	Young Singh Hatyai United (4), Pattani (4)	8
3	(Thailand) Firhan Masae	Jalor City	6
4	(Thailand) Jaturong Samakorn	MH Nakhon Si City	5
4	(Thailand) Chukiet Chimwong	Phuket Andaman	5
4	(Thailand) Suranrat Suwannarat	Trang	5

== Attendances ==
=== Overall statistical table ===
Pos	Team	Total	High	Low	Average	Change
1	Pattani	19,016	6,500	384	1,729	n/a
2	MH Nakhon Si City	10,190	2,650	400	1,133	n/a
3	Nara United	8,332	1,800	432	834	n/a
4	Muang Trang United	7,820	1,600	220	782	n/a
5	Songkhla	7,230	1,368	63	658	n/a
6	Jalor City	5,990	1,000	150	545	n/a
7	Phatthalung	5,605	700	350	510	n/a
8	Phuket Andaman	4,340	600	226	395	n/a
9	Mueang Kon D United	3,390	500	300	377	n/a
10	Trang	4,103	1,500	120	373	n/a
11	Wiang Sa Surat Thani City	3,333	483	300	371	n/a
12	Young Singh Hatyai United	3,625	900	100	363	n/a
	League total	82,974	6,500	63	675	n/a

Source: Thai League
