= 2018 Thai League 3 Upper Region =

2018 T3 Upper Region
- Season: 2018
- Champions: JL Chiangmai United
- Promoted: JL Chiangmai United; Ayutthaya United
- Relegated: Kalasin
- Matches: 182
- Goals: 463 (2.54 per match)
- Top goalscorer: (Thailand) Chatchai Narkwijit (20 goals)
- Biggest home win: 4 goals difference JL Chiangmai United 4–0 Muangkan United (17 March 2018); Ayutthaya United 4–0 Ayutthaya (1 April 2018); Sakaeo 4–0 Kalasin (5 May 2018); Bangkok 4–0 Marines Eureka (21 July 2018); Ayutthaya United 4–0 Muangkan United (5 August 2018)
- Biggest away win: 5 goals difference Bangkok 1–6 Chachoengsao Hi-Tek (7 July 2018)
- Highest scoring: 7 goals JL Chiangmai United 4–3 Marines Eureka (13 May 2018); Bangkok 1–6 Chachoengsao Hi-Tek (7 July 2018); Marines Eureka 5–2 Muangkan United (29 July 2018); JL Chiangmai United 5–2 Lamphun Warrior (25 August 2018)
- Longest winning run: 4 matches JL Chiangmai United; Ayutthaya United; Lamphun Warrior; Phrae United
- Longest unbeaten run: 21 matches JL Chiangmai United
- Longest winless run: 13 matches Kalasin
- Longest losing run: 5 matches Kalasin; Kamphaengphet; Muangkan United
- Highest attendance: 3,116; Chachoengsao Hi-Tek 2–0 Muangkan United (18 August 2018)
- Lowest attendance: 30; Chiangrai City 1–1 Muangkan United (30 June 2018); Chiangrai City 0–0 Kalasin (28 July 2018)
- Total attendance: 82,050
- Average attendance: 450
- All statistics correct as of 25 August 2018.

2018 Thai League 3 Upper Region is the 2nd season of the Thai football league. It is a part of the Thai League 3 and the feeder league for the Thai League 2. A total of 14 teams will compete in the league this season, after Amnat United and Phayao withdrew before the season started.

== Changes from Last Season ==
=== Team changes ===
==== Promoted Clubs ====
Three clubs were promoted from the 2017 Thai League 4

- JL Chiangmai United
- Chiangrai City
- Marines Eureka
- Muangkan United

Two clubs were promoted to the 2018 Thai League 2

- Khonkaen
- Udon Thani

==== Relegated Clubs ====
A club was relegated to the 2018 Thai League 4 Northern Region

- Singburi Bangrajun

A club was relegated from the 2017 Thai League 2

- Bangkok

==== Withdrawn Clubs ====
- Amnat United and Phayao were taking a 2-years break. This team is automatically banned 2 years, don't get subsidy and relegated to 2020 Thai League 4 Northern Region for Phayao, 2020 Thai League 4 North Eastern Region for Amnat United.

== Teams ==
=== Stadium and locations ===
Locations of the Thai League 3 Upper region in 2018
2018 Thai League 3 Upper Region

Football clubs in Bangkok Metropolitan Region
Dissolved team

Team	Location	Stadium	Capacity
Ayutthaya	Ayutthaya	Udhomseelwitthaya School Stadium	1,800
Ayutthaya United	Ayutthaya	Ayutthaya Provincial Stadium	6,000
Bangkok	Bangkok	Bangkokthonburi University Stadium	8,000
Chachoengsao Hi-Tek	Chachoengsao	Chachoengsao Municipality Stadium	6,000
Chiangrai City	Chiang Rai	Singha Stadium	11,354
JL Chiangmai United	Chiang Mai	700th Anniversary Stadium	25,000
Kalasin	Kalasin	Kalasin Municipality Stadium	2,580
Kamphaengphet	Kamphaengphet	Cha Kung Rao Stadium	2,600
Lamphun Warrior	Lamphun	Mae-Guang Stadium	3,000
Marines Eureka	Rayong	Klaeng Municipality Stadium	
Muangkan United	Kanchanaburi	Kleeb Bua Stadium	13,000
Phrae United	Phrae	Thunghong Municipality Stadium	4,500
Sakaeo	Sakaeo	Sakaeo PAO. Stadium	10,000
Ubon Ratchathani	Ubon Ratchathani	Ubon Ratchathani University Stadium	2,000

=== Foreign players ===
Other foreign players.
AFC quota players.
ASEAN quota players.
No foreign player registered.

A T3 team could registered five foreign players by at least one player from AFC member countries and at least one player from ASEAN member countries. A team can use four foreign players on the field in each game, including at least one player from the AFC member countries or ASEAN member countries (3+1).

Note :
(substituted off) : players who released during summer transfer window;
(substituted in) : players who registered during summer transfer window;
↔: players who have dual nationality by half-caste or naturalization.

Club	Leg	Player 1	Player 2	Player 3	Player 4	Player 5
Ayutthaya	1st	(Ivory Coast) Diomande Mouty (substituted off)	(South Korea) Han Yun-soo (substituted off)	(Ivory Coast) Valery Djomon	(Ghana) Emmanuel Kwame	
Ayutthaya	2nd	(Trinidad and Tobago) Kendall Jagdeosingh (substituted in)	(Iran) Taghi Nayebi (substituted in)	(Ivory Coast) Valery Djomon	(Ghana) Emmanuel Kwame	
Ayutthaya United	1st	(Japan) Tomohiro Onodera (substituted off)	(Brazil) Nascimento Neto	(Zambia) Noah Chivuta	(Japan) Kentaro Takamatsu	
Ayutthaya United	2nd	(Uruguay) Diego Emilio Silva (substituted in)	(Brazil) Nascimento Neto	(Zambia) Noah Chivuta	(Japan) Kentaro Takamatsu	
Bangkok	1st					
Bangkok	2nd	(South Korea) Park Ji-soo (substituted in)				
Chachoengsao Hi-Tek	1st	(Cameroon) ↔ (Belgium) Berlin Ndebe-Nlome (substituted off)	(Afghanistan) ↔ (Germany) Mustafa Zazai (substituted off)	(Cameroon) Nyamsi Jacques	(Japan) Naoto Kidoku	
Chachoengsao Hi-Tek	2nd			(Cameroon) Nyamsi Jacques	(Japan) Naoto Kidoku	
Chiangrai City	1st			(Brazil) Raphael Diniz	(South Korea) Kang Min-gu	
Chiangrai City	2nd	(Paraguay) Ever Benítez (substituted in)	(South Korea) Lee Jung-hun (substituted in)	(Brazil) Raphael Diniz	(South Korea) Kang Min-gu	
JL Chiangmai United	1st	(South Korea) Noh Hyeong-cheol (substituted off)	(South Korea) Lee Jung-hun (substituted off)	(Paraguay) Anggello Machuca	(Japan) Taku Ito	
JL Chiangmai United	2nd	(Brazil) Cristian Alex (substituted in)	(Brazil) Roberto Pítio (substituted in)	(Paraguay) Anggello Machuca	(Japan) Taku Ito	
Kalasin	1st	(Cameroon) Kaham Seuntcha Mardochee (substituted off)	(Guinea) Conde Mamoudou (substituted off)	(South Korea) Park Hyung-min (substituted off)	(Ghana) Yaw Mensah	
Kalasin	2nd		(Ghana) Gabriel Mintah (substituted in)	(South Korea) Park Jae-hyung (substituted in)	(Ghana) Yaw Mensah	
Kamphaengphet	1st	(Nigeria) Shola Jimmy Omotosho (substituted off)	(Cameroon) Njifon Abdouramani	(Japan) Masayuki Kudo	(Oman) Badar Al Alawi	
Kamphaengphet	2nd		(Cameroon) Njifon Abdouramani	(Japan) Masayuki Kudo	(Oman) Badar Al Alawi	
Lamphun Warrior	1st	(Guinea) Diabate Ibrahima				
Lamphun Warrior	2nd	(Guinea) Diabate Ibrahima				
Marines Eureka	1st	(Cameroon) Mbassegue Mbarga (substituted off)	(Cameroon) Jislin Sandjo	(Cameroon) Lionel Frank		
Marines Eureka	2nd		(Cameroon) Jislin Sandjo	(Cameroon) Lionel Frank		
Muangkan United	1st	(Myanmar) Tun Tun Win (substituted off)	(Nigeria) Ezeofor Chimaroke Odiri	(Myanmar) Saw Phwe		
Muangkan United	2nd		(Nigeria) Ezeofor Chimaroke Odiri	(Myanmar) Saw Phwe		
Phrae United	1st	(Brazil) Kauê Rodrigues de Araujo (substituted off)	(South Korea) Cho Hyun-woo (substituted off)	(Brazil) Jhonatan Bernardo	(Brazil) Thiago Elias	
Phrae United	2nd	(Brazil) Thales Cruz Salviano de Campos (substituted in)	(Afghanistan) ↔ (Germany) Mustafa Zazai (substituted in)	(Brazil) Jhonatan Bernardo	(Brazil) Thiago Elias	
Sakaeo	1st	(Cameroon) David Bayiha (substituted off)	(Trinidad and Tobago) Kendall Jagdeosingh (substituted off)	(Madagascar) Guy Hubert		
Sakaeo	2nd		(Ghana) Patrick Enninful (substituted in)	(Madagascar) Guy Hubert		
Ubon Ratchathani	1st	(Iran) Rooholah Zare (substituted off)	(Guinea) Badara Aly Diop (substituted off)	(South Korea) Lee Min-kyu (substituted off)	(South Korea) Song I-leum	
Ubon Ratchathani	2nd		(Cameroon) Bouba Abbo (substituted in)	(Egypt) Ahmed Ayman (substituted in)	(South Korea) Song I-leum	

== League table ==
Pos	Team	Pld	W	D	L	GF	GA	GD	Pts	Qualification or relegation
1	JL Chiangmai United (C, Q, P)	26	17	8	1	60	31	+29	59	Promotion to 2019 Thai League 2 and Qualification to 1st Position of Play-off round
2	Ayutthaya United (Q, P)	26	16	6	4	49	23	+26	54	Qualification to 3rd Position of Play-off round
3	Lamphun Warrior	26	13	8	5	36	28	+8	47	
4	Phrae United	26	11	9	6	28	20	+8	42	
5	Bangkok	26	10	7	9	35	36	−1	37	
6	Ubon Ratchathani	26	9	5	12	29	36	−7	32	
7	Ayutthaya	26	8	7	11	26	32	−6	31	
8	Muangkan United	26	7	9	10	34	41	−7	30	
9	Chachoengsao	26	6	11	9	37	35	+2	29	
10	Sakaeo	26	6	10	10	31	34	−3	28	
11	Kamphaengphet	26	6	9	11	24	32	−8	27	
12	Chiangrai City	26	5	11	10	25	34	−9	26	
13	Marines Eureka	26	4	11	11	29	42	−13	23	
14	Kalasin (R)	26	4	9	13	20	39	−19	21	Relegation to the 2019 Thai League 4

Updated to match(es) played on 25 August 2018. Source: Thai League 3
Rules for classification: 1) Points; 2) Head-to-head; 3) Goal difference; 4) Goals scored;).
(C) Champions; (P) Promoted; (Q) Qualified for the phase indicated; (R) Relegated

=== Positions by round ===
The table lists the positions of teams after each week of matches. In order to preserve chronological evolvements, any postponed matches are not included in the round at which they were originally scheduled, but added to the full round they were played immediately afterwards. For example, if a match is scheduled for matchday 13, but then postponed and played between days 16 and 17, it will be added to the standings for day 16.

Team ╲ Round	1	2	3	4	5	6	7	8	9	10	11	12	13	14	15	16	17	18	19	20	21	22	23	24	25	26
JL Chiangmai United	7	3	4	1	4	2	1	2	2	2	2	2	2	2	2	2	2	1	1	1	1	1	1	1	1	1
Ayutthaya United	1	1	1	3	1	1	2	1	1	1	1	1	1	1	1	1	1	2	2	2	2	2	2	2	2	2
Lamphun Warrior	8	4	5	2	6	6	6	4	4	4	4	4	4	3	3	3	4	3	4	3	3	3	4	3	3	3
Phrae United	3	6	7	9	5	3	3	3	3	3	3	3	3	4	4	4	3	4	3	4	4	4	3	4	4	4
Bangkok	6	7	9	5	3	4	7	7	7	7	6	5	7	6	7	7	7	9	9	7	6	6	5	5	5	5
Ubon Ratchathani	12	13	12	12	13	13	14	14	14	13	13	12	13	13	13	13	13	10	11	11	13	10	7	7	7	6
Ayutthaya	5	2	3	7	8	11	8	8	8	10	11	11	12	10	12	12	12	8	7	8	9	11	12	8	10	7
Muangkan United	9	9	2	4	2	5	4	5	5	5	7	7	6	5	5	5	5	5	5	5	5	5	6	6	6	8
Chachoengsao Hi-Tek	2	5	6	8	9	7	9	9	9	8	8	8	8	11	10	10	9	7	6	6	7	7	8	9	8	9
Sakaeo	11	12	13	13	10	12	12	13	13	14	14	13	10	12	9	9	8	11	10	10	12	13	10	10	9	10
Kamphaengphet	4	10	10	11	11	9	5	6	6	6	5	6	5	7	6	6	6	6	8	9	8	9	9	11	11	11
Chiangrai City	14	11	11	10	12	8	10	10	10	9	9	9	9	9	11	11	11	13	13	12	11	8	11	12	12	12
Marines Eureka	13	14	14	14	14	14	13	11	11	11	10	10	11	8	8	8	10	12	12	13	10	12	13	13	13	13
Kalasin	10	8	8	6	7	10	11	12	12	12	12	14	14	14	14	14	14	14	14	14	14	14	14	14	14	14

Source: Thai League 3
= Leader and promotion to the 2019 Thai League 2; = Qualification for Thai League 3 Play-offs; = Relegation to the 2019 Thai League 4

=== Results by round ===
Team ╲ Round	1	2	3	4	5	6	7	8	9	10	11	12	13	14	15	16	17	18	19	20	21	22	23	24	25	26
JL Chiangmai United	D	W	D	W	L	W	W	W	W	D	W	W	W	W	D	D	W	D	W	D	W	D	W	W	W	W
Ayutthaya United	W	W	D	L	W	W	D	W	W	D	W	W	W	W	D	W	D	L	D	W	W	L	W	W	L	W
Lamphun Warrior	D	W	D	W	L	D	D	W	D	W	L	W	W	W	W	L	D	W	D	D	W	W	L	W	W	L
Phrae United	W	L	D	D	W	W	W	W	D	D	W	L	W	L	D	D	W	D	W	L	W	D	W	L	D	L
Bangkok	W	L	D	W	W	L	L	L	D	D	W	W	L	D	L	D	L	L	L	W	W	W	D	W	W	D
Ubon Ratchathani	L	L	W	L	D	L	L	D	L	W	L	W	L	L	D	D	W	W	L	D	L	W	W	W	L	W
Ayutthaya	W	W	L	L	D	L	W	L	D	L	L	D	L	W	L	D	D	W	W	L	L	L	D	W	D	W
Muangkan United	L	W	W	D	W	L	W	L	D	D	L	L	W	W	W	D	D	D	D	D	L	L	L	L	L	D
Chachoengsao Hi-Tek	W	L	D	D	L	W	L	D	D	D	W	L	L	L	D	D	D	W	W	D	L	D	L	L	W	D
Sakaeo	L	L	D	D	W	L	L	L	D	L	L	W	W	L	W	D	D	D	D	D	L	D	W	D	W	L
Kamphaengphet	W	L	D	L	D	W	W	D	L	W	D	L	W	L	D	W	L	L	L	L	L	D	D	L	D	D
Chiangrai City	L	W	D	D	L	W	L	D	D	D	W	L	L	D	L	D	D	L	L	W	D	W	L	L	D	D
Marines Eureka	L	L	L	D	L	D	W	W	D	D	D	D	L	W	D	D	L	L	D	L	W	D	D	L	L	L
Kalasin	L	W	D	W	D	L	L	L	D	L	L	L	L	L	D	L	D	W	D	W	D	L	L	D	L	D

Source: Thai League 3
W = Win; D = Draw; L = Loss

=== Results ===
Home \ Away	AYA	AYU	BKK	CHA	CRC	JCU	KAL	KAM	LPW	MRE	MKU	PHR	SAK	UBR
Ayutthaya		0–1	0–1	2–1	2–0	1–1	0–0	1–2	0–2	2–0	0–3	0–0	2–0	2–0
Ayutthaya United	4–0		3–0	1–0	1–1	1–1	2–1	1–0	2–2	2–1	4–0	1–0	1–0	1–2
Bangkok	0–0	2–1		1–6	1–1	2–1	1–0	3–0	1–1	4–0	2–2	1–2	2–2	1–1
Chachoengsao	0–2	1–1	4–2		3–0	1–2	2–2	1–0	1–1	0–0	2–0	1–1	2–1	1–1
Chiangrai City	3–1	4–1	2–1	1–1		0–3	0–0	0–0	1–2	1–1	1–1	0–1	1–2	1–0
JL Chiangmai United	2–1	3–3	4–2	2–1	4–1		1–0	4–2	5–2	4–3	4–0	1–1	2–2	2–0
Kalasin	2–2	1–0	1–1	0–0	2–2	0–1		0–2	2–3	2–1	1–1	1–0	1–1	0–2
Kamphaengphet	1–1	0–2	0–1	2–1	0–1	1–2	2–3		3–1	0–0	2–1	0–0	0–0	1–1
Lamphun Warrior	2–1	2–2	1–0	2–1	1–0	1–1	2–1	2–0		2–2	2–0	0–1	1–1	1–0
Marines Eureka	1–1	1–4	2–1	0–0	1–1	1–3	2–0	1–1	0–2		5–2	0–1	3–1	0–2
Muangkan United	2–1	1–4	0–1	4–1	1–0	1–1	3–0	1–1	0–0	2–2		1–0	1–1	2–3
Phrae United	2–0	0–1	1–0	2–2	1–1	1–1	2–0	1–1	2–0	2–0	1–4		1–0	3–1
Sakaeo	0–1	0–1	1–2	3–2	1–1	2–3	4–0	1–3	1–0	1–1	0–0	2–2		1–0
Ubon Ratchathani	2–3	0–4	0–2	2–2	2–1	1–2	2–0	2–0	0–1	1–1	2–1	1–0	1–3	

Updated to match(es) played on 25 August 2018. Source: Thai League 3
Legend: Blue = home team win; Yellow = draw; Red = away team win.

== Season statistics ==
=== Top scorers ===
As of 25 August 2018.

Rank	Player	Club	Goals
1	(Thailand) Chatchai Narkwijit	JL Chiangmai United	20
2	(Brazil) Nascimento Dos Santos	Ayutthaya United	15
3	(Thailand) Jaruwat Narmmool	Phuket City (7), Lamphun Warrior (5)	12
3	(Thailand) Saran Sridet	Lamphun Warrior	12
5	(Trinidad and Tobago) Kendall Jagdeosingh	Sakaeo (6), Ayutthaya (4)	10
5	(Japan) Taku Ito	JL Chiangmai United	10
5	(Paraguay) Anggello Machuca	JL Chiangmai United	10
8	(South Korea) Kang Min-gu	Chiangrai City	8
8	(Thailand) Pakkaphon Kanlapakdee	Marines Eureka	8
10	(Thailand) Poramet Arjvirai	Bangkok	7
10	(Nigeria) Jimmy Shola	Kamphaengphet	7
10	(Cameroon) Lionel Frank	Marines Eureka	7
10	(Brazil) Jhonatan Bernardo	Phrae United	7
10	(Thailand) Tuangsit Soimee	Sakaeo	7
10	(Cameroon) Bouba Abbo	Trang (1), Ubon Ratchathani (6)	7

=== Hat-tricks ===
Player	For	Against	Result	Date
(Nigeria) Jimmy Shola	Kamphaengphet	Sakaeo	3–1	22 April 2018
(Trinidad and Tobago) Kendall Jagdeosingh	Sakaeo	Kalasin	4–0	5 May 2018
(Thailand) Poramet Arjvirai	Bangkok	Kamphaengphet	3–0	6 May 2018
(Thailand) Pradit Chuaisuk	Chachoengsao Hi-Tek	Bangkok	6–1	7 July 2018
(Thailand) Adul Namwong	Chiangrai City	Ayutthaya United	4–1	1 August 2018
(Brazil) Nascimento dos Santos	Ayutthaya United	Muangkan United	4–0	5 August 2018

== Attendance ==
Pos	Team	Total	High	Low	Average	Change
1	Chachoengsao Hi-Tek	14,951	3,116	390	1,150	−26.8%
2	Ayutthaya United	12,547	1,345	544	965	−12.0%
3	Lamphun Warrior	10,520	1,530	465	809	−20.7%
4	JL Chiangmai United	7,190	1,200	311	553	+30.1%
5	Phrae United	6,902	971	246	530	−2.4%
6	Ubon Ratchathani	6,051	750	300	465	+2.4%
7	Bangkok	4,021	764	183	309	−50.6%
8	Sakaeo	3,572	460	116	274	−63.1%
9	Ayutthaya	3,382	1,245	38	260	−45.0%
10	Kamphaengphet	3,302	750	111	254	−16.4%
11	Muangkan United	3,164	520	103	243	−31.2%
12	Kalasin	2,829	374	120	218	−41.1%
13	Marines Eureka	2,543	480	115	195	+57.3%
14	Chiangrai City	1,076	195	30	83	−32.5%
	League total	82,050	3,116	30	451	−54.9%

Updated to games played on 25 August 2018
Source: Thai League 3

=== Attendance by home match played ===
Team \ Match played	1	2	3	4	5	6	7	8	9	10	11	12	13	Total
Ayutthaya	355	261	170	149	122	122	200	130	69	1,245	38	171	350	3,382
Ayutthaya United	1,160	895	553	1,134	1,345	883	1,218	1,328	809	993	777	908	544	12,547
Bangkok	222	438	542	321	201	247	225	213	222	193	183	250	764	4,021
Chachoengsao Hi-Tek	1,377	1,350	1,064	1,125	721	1,020	976	1,167	993	852	390	800	3,116	14,951
Chiangrai City	53	52	48	45	75	172	80	30	68	30	82	146	195	1,076
JL Chiangmai United	658	514	531	563	413	552	435	759	409	311	460	385	1,200	7,190
Kalasin	300	374	300	261	218	209	120	200	151	225	130	195	146	2,829
Kamphaengphet	750	255	300	285	220	250	191	250	119	220	220	111	131	3,302
Lamphun Warrior	1,530	720	795	794	825	796	593	676	682	956	465	965	723	10,520
Marines Eureka	480	280	125	185	125	185	120	115	200	200	156	122	250	2,543
Muangkan United	520	212	196	305	210	272	175	300	343	227	103	174	127	3,164
Phrae United	971	520	689	629	546	579	525	322	246	311	435	686	443	6,902
Sakaeo	460	416	250	220	370	200	400	200	116	260	250	180	250	3,572
Ubon Ratchathani	400	500	450	350	400	676	450	750	400	500	450	300	425	6,051

Source: Thai League 3

== See also ==
- 2018 Thai League
- 2018 Thai League 2
- 2018 Thai League 3
- 2018 Thai League 4
- 2018 Thai FA Cup
- 2018 Thai League Cup
- 2018 Thai League 3 Lower Region
