= 2018 Thai League 3 Lower Region =

2018 T3 Lower Region
- Season: 2018
- Champions: MOF Customs United
- Promoted: MOF Customs United
- Relegated: Deffo
- Matches: 182
- Goals: 451 (2.48 per match)
- Top goalscorer: (Serbia) Uroš Stojanov (Japan) Daiki Konomura (15 goals)
- Biggest home win: 7 goals difference Nara United 7–0 Simork (5 August 2018)
- Biggest away win: 4 goals difference Simork 0–4 Royal Thai Army (1 August 2018)
- Highest scoring: 8 goals Simork 3–5 MOF Customs United (26 August 2018)
- Longest winning run: 5 matches MOF Customs United; Phuket City; BTU United
- Longest unbeaten run: 13 matches Nara United
- Longest winless run: 12 matches Deffo
- Longest losing run: 5 matches Simork; Surat Thani; Royal Thai Army; BTU United
- Highest attendance: 1,297; Trang 1–1 Nara United (15 July 2018)
- Lowest attendance: 45; Rajpracha 0–0 Nara United (11 August 2018)
- Total attendance: 58,111
- Average attendance: 322
- All statistics correct as of 26 August 2018.

2018 Thai League 3 Lower Region is the 2nd season of the Thai football league. It is a part of the Thai League 3 and the feeder league for the Thai League 2. A total of 14 teams will compete in the league this season, after Banbueng withdrew before the season started.

== Changes from Last Season ==
=== Team changes ===
==== Promoted Clubs ====
A club was promoted from the 2017 Thai League 4

- BTU United

A clubs was promoted to the 2018 Thai League 2

- Samut Sakhon

==== Relegated Clubs ====
A club was relegated to the 2018 Thai League 4 Western Region

- Krung Thonburi

A club was relegated from the 2017 Thai League 2

- Songkhla United

==== Renamed Clubs ====
- Banbueng authorize from Phuket City because Banbueng is an absolute football club quota.
- Bangkok University Deffo was renamed to Deffo
- Nakhon Si Thammarat Unity was renamed to WU Nakhon Si United

==== Expansion Clubs ====
- Songkhla United and Krung Thonburi Club-licensing football club didn't pass to play 2018 Thai League 3 Lower Region. This team is banned 2 years and Relegated to 2020 Thai League 4 Southern Region for Songkhla United, 2020 Thailand Amateur League Bangkok Metropolitan Region for Krung Thonburi.

== Teams ==
=== Stadium and locations ===
Locations of the Thai League 3 Lower region in 2018
Football clubs in Bangkok Metropolitan Region

Team	Location	Stadium	Capacity
BTU United	Bangkok	Bangkok-Thonburi University Stadium	1,500
Chamchuri United	Bangkok	Chulalongkorn University Stadium	20,000
Deffo	Bangkok	TOT Stadium Chaeng Watthana	5,000
Kasem Bundit University	Bangkok	Kasem Bundit University Stadium, Rom Klao	2,000
MOF Customs United	Samut Prakan	Customs Department Stadium, Ladkrabang 54	2,000
Nara United	Narathiwat	Narathiwat PAO. Stadium	5,000
Phuket City	Phuket	Surakul Stadium	15,000
Rajpracha	Bangkok	Thonburi Stadium	1,000
Ranong United	Ranong	Ranong Provincial Stadium	7,000
Royal Thai Army	Bangkok	Thai Army Sports Stadium	20,000
Simork	Angthong	Angthong Provincial Stadium	6,000
Surat Thani	Surat Thani	Surat Thani Provincial Stadium	10,000
Trang	Trang	Trang Municipality Stadium	5,000
WU Nakhon Si United	Nakhon Si Thammarat	Walailak University Stadium	10,000

=== Foreign players ===
Other foreign players.
AFC quota players.
ASEAN quota players.
No foreign player registered.

A T3 team could registered five foreign players by at least one player from AFC member countries and at least one player from ASEAN member countries. A team can use four foreign players on the field in each game, including at least one player from the AFC member countries or ASEAN member countries (3+1).

Note :
(substituted off) : players who released during summer transfer window;
(substituted on) : players who registered during summer transfer window;
↔: players who have dual nationality by half-caste or naturalization.

Club	Leg	Player 1	Player 2	Player 3	Player 4	Player 5
BTU United	1st	(Brazil) Felipe Silva Abreu	(Ivory Coast) Kouassi Bernard	(Madagascar) Thierry Ratsimbazafy	(South Korea) Lee Heon-ju	
BTU United	2nd	(Brazil) Felipe Silva Abreu	(Ivory Coast) Kouassi Bernard	(Madagascar) Thierry Ratsimbazafy	(South Korea) Lee Heon-ju	
Chamchuri United	1st	(South Korea) Han Ji-Seong (substituted off)	(Japan) Daiki Higuchi	(Japan) Hiroyuki Sugimoto	(South Korea) Kim Jun-ho	
Chamchuri United	2nd	(Nigeria) Julius Chukwuma Ononiwu (substituted on)	(Japan) Daiki Higuchi	(Japan) Hiroyuki Sugimoto	(South Korea) Kim Jun-ho	
Deffo	1st	(Ivory Coast) Adama Diomandé (substituted off)	(United States) Diego Barrera (substituted off)	(Namibia) Tangeni Shipahu	(South Korea) Song Jin-ouk	
Deffo	2nd	(Cameroon) Kedi Amang Ghislain Roger (substituted on)	(Japan) Ise Yohei (substituted on)	(Namibia) Tangeni Shipahu	(South Korea) Song Jin-ouk	
Kasem Bundit University	1st	(Brazil) Víctor Moraes (substituted off)	(South Korea) Kim Myung-Su (substituted off)	(South Korea) Song Yun-ho (substituted off)	(South Africa) Sanou Oumar	
Kasem Bundit University	2nd	(Brazil) Alaan Bruno De Sousa Santos (substituted on)	(Brazil) Caíque Freitas Ribeiro (substituted on)	(Japan) Taiga Watabe (substituted on)	(South Africa) Sanou Oumar	
MOF Customs United	1st	(Ivory Coast) Ibrahim Coulibaly (substituted off)	(Nigeria) Efe Jerry Obode (substituted off)	(Serbia) Uroš Stojanov	(South Korea) Hwang In-seong	
MOF Customs United	2nd	(Brazil) Giuberty Silva Neves (substituted on)	(Nigeria) Anayo Cosmas Onuora (substituted on)	(Serbia) Uroš Stojanov	(South Korea) Hwang In-seong	
Nara United	1st	(South Korea) Kim Ban-suk (substituted off)	(Ivory Coast) Ibrahim Dicko	(Egypt) Osama Ibrahim	(South Korea) Jung Jung-yu	
Nara United	2nd	(France) Nicolas Vandelli (substituted on)	(Ivory Coast) Ibrahim Dicko	(Egypt) Osama Ibrahim	(South Korea) Jung Jung-yu	
Phuket City	1st	(Myanmar) Kyaw Phyo Wai (substituted off)	(South Korea) Lee Jun-Ki (substituted off)			
Phuket City	2nd		(Japan) Ryosuke Nagasawa (substituted on)			
Rajpracha	1st		(Nigeria) Anayo Cosmas Onuora (substituted off)	(Nigeria) Julius Ononiwu (substituted off)	(Nigeria) Onyemelukwe Okechukwu	
Rajpracha	2nd	(South Korea) Kong Tae-hyun (substituted on)	(Cameroon) Kameni Roderigue Ferdinand (substituted on)	(Argentina) Lucas Daniel Echenique (substituted on)	(Nigeria) Onyemelukwe Okechukwu	
Ranong United	1st	(Brazil) Alaan Bruno De Sousa Santos (substituted off)	(Brazil) Giuberty Silva Neves (substituted off)	(Republic of the Congo) Burnel Okana-Stazi	(South Korea) Kim Tae-woong	(Myanmar) Win Hlaing Oo
Ranong United	2nd	(Cameroon) Kaham Seuntcha Mardochee (substituted on)	(Cameroon) Armand Mefire Njikam (substituted on)	(Republic of the Congo) Burnel Okana-Stazi	(South Korea) Kim Tae-woong	(Myanmar) Win Hlaing Oo
Royal Thai Army	1st					
Royal Thai Army	2nd					
Simork	1st		(Nigeria) Oparaobioma Kingsley			
Simork	2nd	(Egypt) Mohamed Osman Abdelaty (substituted on)	(Nigeria) Oparaobioma Kingsley			
Surat Thani	1st	(Brazil) Vinicius Silva Freitas (substituted off)	(Laos) Phathana Phommathep (substituted off)	(Ivory Coast) Soumahoro Mafa	(Ivory Coast) Kourouma Mohamed	(Iran) Faramarz; Vahdat Derakhshan
Surat Thani	2nd	(Ivory Coast) Ibrahim Coulibaly (substituted on)	(Cambodia) Khoun Laboravy (substituted on)	(Ivory Coast) Soumahoro Mafa	(Ivory Coast) Kourouma Mohamed	(Iran) Faramarz; Vahdat Derakhshan
Trang	1st	(Brazil) Fernando Abreu (substituted off)	(Cameroon) Bouba Abbo (substituted off)	(Brazil) Douglas Lopes Carneiro	(Japan) Tetsuro Inoue	
Trang	2nd	(Brazil) Ricardo Theodoro de Almeida (substituted on)	(Brazil) Nelisson Teles (substituted on)	(Brazil) Douglas Lopes Carneiro	(Japan) Tetsuro Inoue	
WU Nakhon Si United	1st	(Japan) Endo Shiyu (substituted off)	(Ghana) Samuel Abega Ampofo	(Ghana) Daniel Mensah	(Japan) Daiki Konomura	
WU Nakhon Si United	2nd	(Nigeria) Efe Jerry Obode (substituted on)	(Ghana) Samuel Abega Ampofo	(Ghana) Daniel Mensah	(Japan) Daiki Konomura	

== League table ==
Pos	Team	Pld	W	D	L	GF	GA	GD	Pts	Qualification or relegation
1	MOF Customs United (Q, P)	26	15	9	2	43	23	+20	54	Promotion to 2019 Thai League 2 and Qualification to 1st Position of Play-off round
2	Nara United (Q)	26	13	11	2	45	18	+27	50 (Note: Nara United ahead on head-to-head record; Nara United 4 pts, Trang 1 pt.)	Qualification to 3rd Position of Play-off round
3	Trang	26	14	8	4	34	16	+18	50	
4	Chamchuri United	26	12	5	9	32	27	+5	41	
5	Phuket City	26	11	7	8	29	23	+6	40	
6	BTU United	26	11	5	10	38	32	+6	38	
7	Royal Thai Army	26	10	5	11	30	31	−1	35	
8	WU Nakhon Si United	26	9	7	10	31	31	0	34	
9	Ranong United	26	9	4	13	30	33	−3	31	
10	Surat Thani	26	6	8	12	34	49	−15	26	
11	Kasem Bundit University	26	5	10	11	26	33	−7	25	
12	Simork	26	5	8	13	30	57	−27	23 (Note: Head-to-head record (Mini league): Simork 6 pts(gd +3), Rajpracha 6 pts(gd +1), Deffo 2 pts.)	
13	Rajpracha	26	5	8	13	25	42	−17	23	
14	Deffo (R)	26	4	11	11	24	36	−12	23	Relegation to the 2019 Thai League 4

Updated to match(es) played on 26 August 2018. Source: Thai League 3
Rules for classification: 1) Points; 2) Head-to-head; 3) Goal difference; 4) Goals scored;).
(P) Promoted; (Q) Qualified for the phase indicated; (R) Relegated

=== Positions by round ===
Leader and promotion to the 2019 Thai League 2
Qualification for Thai League 3 Play-offs
Relegation to the 2019 Thai League 4

The table lists the positions of teams after each week of matches. In order to preserve chronological evolvements, any postponed matches are not included in the round at which they were originally scheduled, but added to the full round they were played immediately afterwards. For example, if a match is scheduled for matchday 13, but then postponed and played between days 16 and 17, it will be added to the standings for day 16.

Team ╲ Round	1	2	3	4	5	6	7	8	9	10	11	12	13	14	15	16	17	18	19	20	21	22	23	24	25	26
MOF Customs United	8	4	5	3	6	5	4	4	5	2	2	2	1	1	1	1	1	2	2	1	1	1	1	1	1	1
Nara United	5	7	4	6	5	3	3	3	1	1	1	1	2	2	2	2	2	3	3	3	3	3	3	3	3	2
Trang	11	3	2	4	2	4	5	5	2	3	3	3	3	3	3	3	3	1	1	2	2	2	2	2	2	3
Chamchuri United	4	6	10	7	8	7	6	7	6	6	6	6	6	7	6	5	5	4	5	4	4	4	4	4	4	4
Phuket City	6	8	6	5	3	2	1	1	3	4	5	5	4	4	4	4	4	5	4	5	5	5	6	7	6	5
BTU United	1	1	1	1	1	1	2	2	4	5	4	4	5	5	7	7	8	7	7	6	6	6	5	5	5	6
Royal Thai Army	9	10	12	13	13	14	12	14	12	13	12	11	10	9	9	11	12	10	9	10	9	8	7	6	8	7
WU Nakhon Si United	7	11	14	14	14	12	13	11	10	10	10	10	11	11	10	8	7	8	8	8	8	7	8	8	7	8
Ranong United	3	2	3	2	4	6	7	6	7	8	8	7	8	6	5	6	6	6	6	7	7	9	9	9	9	9
Surat Thani	2	5	8	10	11	11	9	9	9	9	9	8	7	8	8	10	10	13	12	12	12	12	11	11	11	10
Kasem Bundit University	12	12	13	11	12	13	14	12	13	11	11	12	12	12	12	12	11	11	11	9	10	10	10	10	10	11
Simork	10	9	7	8	7	8	8	8	8	7	7	9	9	10	11	9	9	9	10	11	11	11	12	12	12	12
Rajpracha	13	13	9	12	9	9	10	10	11	12	13	13	13	13	13	14	14	14	14	14	14	14	14	14	14	13
Deffo	14	14	11	9	10	10	11	13	14	14	14	14	14	14	14	13	13	12	13	13	13	13	13	13	13	14

Source: Thai League 3

=== Results by round ===
Team ╲ Round	1	2	3	4	5	6	7	8	9	10	11	12	13	14	15	16	17	18	19	20	21	22	23	24	25	26
MOF Customs United	D	W	D	W	L	W	D	W	D	W	W	W	W	W	D	W	L	D	D	D	W	W	W	D	W	W
Nara United	D	D	W	D	W	W	W	L	W	D	W	W	L	W	W	D	D	D	D	D	W	W	D	W	D	W
Trang	D	W	W	D	W	D	L	W	W	D	D	W	D	W	W	L	W	W	D	L	W	L	W	W	W	D
Chamchuri United	D	D	L	W	D	W	W	L	W	D	W	L	L	L	W	W	W	W	L	W	D	W	L	W	L	L
Phuket City	D	D	W	W	W	W	W	L	D	D	D	D	W	W	L	W	L	L	W	L	L	L	L	W	D	W
BTU United	W	W	W	W	W	L	D	L	L	D	W	D	L	L	L	L	L	W	D	W	L	W	W	W	L	D
Royal Thai Army	D	L	L	L	L	L	W	D	D	L	D	W	W	W	L	L	L	W	W	L	W	W	W	W	L	D
WU Nakhon Si United	D	L	L	L	L	W	L	W	D	W	D	L	D	L	W	W	W	L	W	D	L	W	D	D	W	L
Ranong United	W	D	W	W	L	L	L	W	L	L	L	W	L	W	W	L	W	D	D	L	L	L	L	W	D	L
Surat Thani	W	L	L	L	L	D	W	D	W	D	D	W	D	L	L	L	L	L	D	W	D	L	D	L	L	W
Kasem Bundit University	L	D	L	D	L	L	D	W	L	W	D	L	D	D	L	D	W	D	W	W	D	D	L	L	L	L
Simork	D	D	D	L	W	D	D	L	W	W	L	L	L	L	D	W	W	L	L	D	D	L	L	L	L	L
Rajpracha	L	D	D	L	W	D	L	D	L	L	L	L	W	L	D	L	L	L	L	W	D	D	L	D	W	W
Deffo	L	D	D	D	L	D	L	D	L	L	L	L	W	D	D	W	D	W	L	L	D	L	W	L	D	D

Source: Thai League 3
W = Win; D = Draw; L = Loss

=== Results ===
Home \ Away	BTU	CCU	DEF	KBU	MCU	NRU	PKC	RAJ	RNU	RTA	SMK	SRT	TRG	WNU
BTU United		2–0	3–0	2–1	1–1	1–2	0–0	0–1	2–0	1–2	1–2	4–1	2–1	2–1
Chamchuri United	2–1		1–0	2–0	0–1	0–0	0–1	1–0	2–1	3–2	4–2	5–2	1–0	1–0
Deffo	2–2	2–1		0–0	0–0	0–0	1–2	1–1	2–1	1–2	2–2	2–2	0–0	1–2
Kasem Bundit University	1–0	0–0	0–0		0–1	2–2	1–0	3–1	0–2	0–1	4–1	1–3	0–1	0–2
MOF Customs United	2–2	3–1	2–2	1–1		2–1	2–0	2–1	3–0	2–1	0–0	4–1	0–2	2–1
Nara United	1–0	1–0	1–0	0–0	2–2		1–1	4–1	0–0	2–0	7–0	5–2	3–0	1–1
Phuket City	0–1	1–1	2–1	1–2	1–1	2–2		2–0	2–1	2–0	4–0	2–1	0–0	1–0
Rajpracha	2–1	0–2	2–1	2–2	0–1	0–0	0–0		3–2	1–2	2–2	1–2	0–1	3–2
Ranong United	2–3	1–0	1–1	2–1	1–2	0–2	1–0	2–0		1–0	3–0	1–1	1–3	0–1
Royal Thai Army	1–2	0–1	2–1	2–2	0–2	2–1	2–1	2–0	0–2		0–1	0–0	1–1	2–1
Simork	0–1	1–1	3–0	2–2	3–5	0–2	1–2	2–2	1–1	0–4		1–0	1–3	2–2
Surat Thani	2–2	3–2	2–3	3–2	0–2	0–1	1–2	2–2	1–0	2–1	0–2		0–0	1–1
Trang	3–1	1–1	0–1	2–1	2–0	1–1	2–0	0–0	3–1	0–0	3–0	1–0		1–0
WU Nakhon Si United	2–1	2–0	2–0	0–0	0–0	1–3	1–0	3–0	0–3	1–1	2–1	2–2	1–3	

Updated to match(es) played on 26 August 2018. Source: Thai League 3
Legend: Blue = home team win; Yellow = draw; Red = away team win.

== Season statistics ==
=== Top scorers ===
As of 26 August 2018.

Rank	Player	Club	Goals
1	(Serbia) Uroš Stojanov	MOF Customs United	15
1	(Japan) Daiki Konomura	WU Nakhon Si United	15
3	(South Korea) Jung Jung-yu	Nara United	14
4	(Thailand) Jaruwat Narmmool	Phuket City (7), Lamphun Warrior (5)	12
4	(Ivory Coast) Mohamed Kourouma	Surat Thani	12
6	(Ivory Coast) Ibrahim Dicko	Nara United	11
7	(Nigeria) Efe Obode	MOF Customs United (1), WU Nakhon Si United (9)	10
8	(Republic of the Congo) Burnel Okana-Stazi	Ranong United	9
8	(Brazil) Douglas Lopes Carneiro	Trang	9
10	(Thailand) Kasitinard Sriphirom	Chamchuri United	8
10	(Thailand) Amarin Jaisuesat	Surat Thani	8

=== Hat-tricks ===
Player	For	Against	Result	Date
(Thailand) Ahamarasul Due-reh	Nara United	Surat Thani	5–2	24 February 2018
(South Korea) Jung Jung-yu	Nara United	Rajpracha	4–1	6 May 2018
(South Korea) Jung Jung-yu	Nara United	Simork	7–0	5 August 2018
(Thailand) Anirut Suebyim	Banbueng Phuket City	Simork	4–0	19 August 2018

== Attendance ==
Pos	Team	Total	High	Low	Average	Change
1	Nara United	9,402	1,100	240	783	−18.9%
2	Trang	9,326	1,297	279	777	+18.3%
3	Ranong United	5,375	600	250	413	−10.2%
4	MOF Customs United	5,142	720	123	395	+27.0%
5	BTU United	4,540	424	285	349	−23.1%
6	Phuket City	3,730	503	100	286	+20.7%
7	Royal Thai Army	3,378	550	136	260	+23.2%
8	WU Nakhon Si United	3,004	485	85	231	+43.5%
9	Deffo	2,994	446	50	230	+45.6%
10	Simork	2,747	450	130	211	+12.8%
11	Surat Thani	2,504	319	102	193	−37.7%
12	Kasem Bundit University	2,248	300	100	172	−11.3%
13	Chamchuri United	2,196	250	100	169	−61.8%
14	Rajpracha	1,525	200	45	117	−41.8%
	League total	58,111	1,297	45	323	−20.0%

Updated to games played on 26 August 2018
Source: Thai League 3

=== Attendance by home match played ===
Team \ Match played	1	2	3	4	5	6	7	8	9	10	11	12	13	Total
BTU United	424	422	350	342	313	321	286	285	346	397	366	323	365	4,540
Chamchuri United	146	150	200	200	150	250	150	150	150	200	150	100	200	2,196
Deffo	422	446	321	60	250	255	365	125	100	150	50	150	300	2,994
Kasem Bundit University	200	210	100	120	200	250	107	150	200	300	100	100	211	2,248
MOF Customs United	200	300	123	416	250	425	720	650	478	300	250	430	600	5,142
Nara United	980	948	800	884	1,100	850	240	550	600	950	700	Unk.2	800	9,402
Phuket City	503	435	308	337	369	401	429	217	207	215	100	106	103	3,730
Rajpracha	150	70	120	120	100	180	160	200	100	100	80	45	100	1,525
Ranong United	500	500	400	300	500	600	500	400	250	300	400	250	475	5,375
Royal Thai Army	223	255	250	164	136	230	253	550	195	156	280	186	500	3,378
Simork	160	156	209	185	135	220	189	215	189	250	130	259	450	2,747
Surat Thani	260	319	217	248	276	200	219	152	123	102	119	119	150	2,504
Trang	1,050	900	550	279	950	610	628	798	800	1,297	Unk.1	770	694	9,326
WU Nakhon Si United	485	364	300	150	200	85	150	150	100	200	220	200	400	3,004

Source: Thai League 3
Note:
Unk.1 Some error of T3 official match report 28 July 2018 (Trang 3–1 Ranong United).
Unk.2 Some error of T3 official match report 5 August 2018 (Nara United 7–0 Simork).
