= Mueang Kon D United F.C. =

Mueang Kon D United เมืองคนดี ยูไนเต็ด
- Full name: Mueang Kon D United Football Club
- Nicknames: The monkey potentate (พญาวานร)
- Founded: 2022; 4 years ago
- Ground: Surat Thani Provincial Stadium; Surat Thani, Thailand
- Capacity: 10,000
- Coordinates: 9°08′06″N 99°20′50″E
- Owner(s): Mueang Kon D United Co., Ltd.
- Chairman: Worapot Chutimaporn
- Head coach: Chaiyachet Kotchakosai
- League: Thailand Semi-pro League
- 2022–23: Thai League 3, 12th of 12 in the Southern region (relegated)
- Website: https://web.facebook.com/MUEANGKONDUNITED

Mueang Kon D United Football Club (Thai สโมสรฟุตบอล เมืองคนดี ยูไนเต็ด), is a Thai football club based in Mueang, Surat Thani, Thailand. The club is currently playing in the Thai League 3 Southern region.

== History ==
In early 2022, the club was established and competed in Thailand Amateur League Southern region, using the Surat Thani Provincial Stadium as the ground. At the end of the season, the club could be promoted to the Thai League 3. They use the Surat Thani Provincial Stadium as a ground to compete for the T3 in the 2022–23 season.

In late 2022, Mueang Kon D United competed in the Thai League 3 for the 2022–23 season. It is their first season in the professional league. The club started the season with a 1–1 home draw with Nara United and they ended the season with a 0–5 away defeat to the Nara United. The club has finished twelfth place in the league of the Southern region and relegated to the lower division in next season. In addition, in the 2022–23 Thai League Cup Mueang Kon D United was defeated 0–1 by Pattani in the first qualification round, causing them to be eliminated.

== Stadium and locations ==
Coordinates	Location	Stadium	Year
9°08′06″N 99°20′50″E	Surat Thani	Surat Thani Provincial Stadium	2022 – present

== Season by season record ==
Season	League									FA Cup	League Cup	Top goalscorer	
Season	Division	P	W	D	L	F	A	Pts	Pos	FA Cup	League Cup	Name	Goals
2022	TA South	5	4	1	0	5	1	9	3rd	Not enter	Can't Enter	(Thailand) Suteerawat Rakkan, (Thailand) Titipan Klinmake	2
2022–23	T3 South	22	2	5	15	13	42	11	12th	Not enter	QR1	(Thailand) Apisit Yutimit	4

Champions	Runners-up	Promoted	Relegated

- P = Played
- W = Games won
- D = Games drawn
- L = Games lost
- F = Goals for
- A = Goals against
- Pts = Points
- Pos = Final position
- QR1 = First Qualifying Round
- QR2 = Second Qualifying Round
- R1 = Round 1
- R2 = Round 2
- R3 = Round 3
- R4 = Round 4
- R5 = Round 5
- R6 = Round 6
- QF = Quarter-finals
- SF = Semi-finals
- RU = Runners-up
- W = Winners

== Players ==
=== Current squad ===
As of 19 March 2023

Note: Flags indicate national team as defined under FIFA eligibility rules; some limited exceptions apply. Players may hold more than one non-FIFA nationality.

No.	Pos.	Nation	Player
3	DF	THA	Songpon Plaimuang
5	DF	THA	Watcharakorn Chobtham
6	DF	THA	Chakkriphan Kadnadin
8	MF	THA	Titipan Klinmake
9	MF	THA	Narongrit Rattanaklao
10	MF	THA	Amnuai Nueaoon
11	MF	THA	Wiraphong Sankaew
14	MF	THA	Tanawut Sutthinun
18	MF	THA	Iyarak Chumdaeng
19	MF	THA	Nitipat Nunpuy
23	FW	THA	Chartdanai Priksuwan
24	GK	THA	Phanupong Songdecha
25	MF	THA	Rattanapon Rattanaklao
26	MF	THA	Ratchapol Sopha
28	DF	TOG	Vincent Bossou
30	GK	THA	Wichaya Ganthong (captain)

No.	Pos.	Nation	Player
32	DF	THA	Teerawat Suban
33	MF	THA	Nopadol Poolsawat
35	DF	THA	Samart Chucherd
38	DF	THA	์natthaphat Kitpanaporn
39	DF	THA	Thawatchai Promsrikeaw
42	GK	THA	Suriya Kananurug
44	MF	THA	Siwapong Jarernsin
49	FW	THA	Khanchit Wannaphakdi
51	MF	THA	Piyabut Srichaiwal
55	DF	THA	Teeraphon Sangdech
66	DF	THA	Thanathat Rungrot
69	DF	THA	Apisit Yutimit
77	MF	THA	Weerasak Jeeroun
88	MF	THA	Suriya Kananurug
99	FW	THA	Raksaphong Ruangram
