= Chairat Madsiri =

Thai footballer (born 1982)

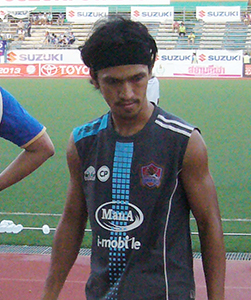

Personal information
- Full name: Chairat Madsiri
- Date of birth: 29 September 1982 (age 44)
- Place of birth: Songkhla, Thailand
- Height: 1.78 m (5 ft 10 in)
- Position: Midfielder

Youth career
- 2001–2004: Pattani Technical College
- 2005–2007: Rattana Bundit University

Senior career*
Years	Team	Apps	(Gls)
2007	Muangthong United	4	(0)
2009–2011	Songkhla	25	(9)
2012–2016	Songkhla United	82	(10)
2017–2018	Hatyai	26	(2)
2019–2021	Songkhla	29	(4)
2022–2023	Young Singh Hatyai United	10	(0)
2024	Songkhla	4	(0)
Total		180	(25)

Managerial career
- 2021: Songkhla (interim)
- * Club domestic league appearances and goals as of 7 April 2024

Chairat Madsiri (Thai: ไชยรัตน์ หมัดศิริ, born September 29, 1982) is a retired professional footballer from Thailand. He is one of the most renowned footballers from Southern Thailand, having played primarily for teams representing provinces in the South.
