= Vincent Bossou =

Togolese footballer

Personal information
- Date of birth: 7 February 1986 (age 40)
- Place of birth: Kara, Togo
- Height: 1.92 m (6 ft 4 in)
- Position: Centre-back

Youth career
- 1997–2006: Maranatha

Senior career*
Years	Team	Apps	(Gls)
2006–2009	Maranatha	77	(5)
2010	ES Sahel	3	(0)
2010–2011	Maranatha	23	(3)
2011–2012	Navibank Sài Gòn	35	(1)
2013	Becamex Bình Dương	2	(0)
2013	TDC Bình Dương	17	(0)
2014	An Giang	21	(0)
2015	Goyang Hi	0	(0)
2015–2018	Young Africans	76	(3)
2019–2020	Pattani	45	(2)
2021–2022	MH Khon Surat City	23	(0)
2022–2023	Mueang Kon D United	4	(0)

International career
2007–2017	Togo	27	(1)
- * Club domestic league appearances and goals

Vincent Bossou (born 7 February 1986) is a Togolese former professional footballer who played as a centre-back.

== Club career ==
Born in Kara, Togo, Bossou began his career with Maranatha and joined on 15 January 2010 with Étoile Sportive du Sahel signing a two-year contract. His contract with Étoile Sportive du Sahel was terminated after only three months and Bossou returned to Maranatha on 18 March 2010.

In May 2011, he moved to Vietnam and signed a contract with Navibank Saigon

In 2019, he moved to Pattani, Thailand and signed a contract with Pattani Football Club.

== International career ==
Bossou was part of the Togolese squad for the 2010 African Cup of Nations which withdrew prior to playing a match due to the Togo national football team attack.

== Career statistics ==
Scores and results list Togo's goal tally first.

No	Date	Venue	Opponent	Score	Result	Competition
1.	4 September 2016	Stade de Kégué, Lomé, Togo	Djibouti	1–0	5–0	2017 Africa Cup of Nations qualification
