= Siwapong Jarernsin =

Thai footballer

Personal information
- Full name: Siwapong Jarernsin
- Date of birth: July 22, 1985 (age 41)
- Place of birth: Chonburi, Thailand
- Height: 1.76 m (5 ft 9 1/2 in)
- Position: Midfielder

Team information
- Current team: Mueang Kon D United
- Number: 44

Senior career*
Years	Team	Apps	(Gls)
2007	RBAC	0	(0)
2008	Customs Department	0	(0)
2009	Surat Thani	22	(7)
2010	Ayutthaya	14	(3)
2010	Buriram	12	(2)
2011–2012	Phattalung	28	(5)
2012	Bangkok Glass	9	(1)
2013–2015	PTT Rayong	8	(0)
2014	→ Sisaket (loan)	13	(2)
2016	Air Force Central	10	(1)
2016	Sisaket	5	(2)
2017	Port	2	(0)
2018	Khon Kaen		
2019	Nongbua Pitchaya	11	(1)
2020	Lamphun Warrior	0	(0)
2020–2021	Pattani	16	(0)
2021–2022	Krabi	32	(1)
2023–	Mueang Kon D United	8	(2)
- * Club domestic league appearances and goals as of 19 March 2023

Siwapong Jarernsin (Thai: ศิวะพงษ์ เจริญศิลป์, born July 22, 1985) is a Thai professional footballer who plays as a midfielder for Thai League 3 club Mueang Kon D United.

== Honours ==
Krabi

- Thai League 3 runners-up: 2021–22
- Thai League 3 Southern Region winners: 2021–22
