= Uroš Stojanov =

Serbian footballer (born 1989)

Personal information
- Date of birth: 5 January 1989 (age 37)
- Place of birth: Kikinda, SFR Yugoslavia
- Height: 1.90 m (6 ft 3 in)
- Position: Second striker

Team information
- Current team: OFK Kikinda

Senior career*
Years	Team	Apps	(Gls)
2010–2011	Donji Srem	7	(2)
2012–2013	Radnički Pirot	44	(19)
2013–2014	Jedinstvo Bihać	28	(17)
2014–2015	Zvijezda Gradačac	27	(11)
2015	Ayia Napa	12	(5)
2016	Prachuap Khiri Khan	0	(0)
2017	Kissamikos	18	(3)
2017–2018	Rudar Pljevlja	9	(0)
2018–2019	MOF Customs United	49	(22)
2020–2021	ÍF	38	(23)
2021–2022	B36 Tórshavn	22	(7)
2022–2023	Skála	13	(7)
2023	07 Vestur	19	(8)
2024	ÍF	23	(6)
2025–	OFK Kikinda		
- * Club domestic league appearances and goals as of 27 October 2024

Uroš Stojanov (Serbian Cyrillic: Урош Стојанов; born 5 January 1989) is a Serbian footballer who plays as a forward for OFK Kikinda.

== Career ==
In June 2015, Stojanov was rumoured to Zorya Luhansk.

On 25 June 2021, Stojanov signed with B36 Tórshavn, after he became joint top goalscorer of the Faroe Islands Premier League the season before for league rivals ÍF Fuglafjørður.

Stojanov joined newly promoted Skála on 19 June 2022. In November 2022, it was announced that he would move to 07 Vestur for the 2023 season.
