= Young Singh Hatyai United F.C. =

Thai football club

Young Singh Hatyai United ยังสิงห์ หาดใหญ่ ยูไนเต็ด
- Full name: Young Singh Hatyai United Football Club
- Nicknames: The Young Lions of Two Seas (สิงห์หนุ่มสองทะเล)
- Founded: 2017; 9 years ago, as Hatyai City Football Club; 2021; 5 years ago, as Young Singh Hatyai United Football Club
- Ground: Southern Major City Stadium; Songkhla, Thailand
- Capacity: 5,000
- Coordinates: 6°55′05″N 100°27′27″E
- Chairman: Surachet Chaiwong
- Head coach: vacant
- League: Thailand Semi-pro League
- 2022–23: Thai League 3, 3rd of 12 in the Southern region (Relegated)
- Website: young-singh-hatyai-united-fc.com

Young Singh Hatyai United Football Club (Thai สโมสรฟุตบอลยังสิงห์ หาดใหญ่ ยูไนเต็ด), is a Thai professional football club based in Hatyai, Songkhla, Thailand. The club is currently playing in the Thai League 3 Southern region.

== History ==
In 2017, the club has established as Hatyai City F.C. and competed in Thailand Amateur League Southern region. This club promoted to Thai League 4 (also known as Omsin League) since 2018 season, competed in the Southern region.

In 2019, the club still competed in Thai League 4 Southern region. And they move their ground to the Southern major city stadium.

In 2021, the club renamed to Young Singh Hatyai United F.C.

In 2022, Young Singh Hatyai United competed in the Thai League 3 for the 2022–23 season. It is their 2nd season in the professional league. The club started the season with a 0–0 home draw with Pattani and they ended the season with a 2–1 away win over Pattani. The club has finished 3rd place in the league of the Southern region. In addition, in the 2022–23 Thai League Cup Young Singh Hatyai United was defeated 2–4 by Phitsanulok in the first round, causing them to be eliminated.

In 2023, Young Singh Hatyai United has been promoted from United Nations (UN) to be a member of the "Football for the Goals project", a project to support the global football community for sustainable development(SDGs 17), which Young Singh Hat Yai United is the only club in ASEAN that has been selected. And is in the project with the world's leading clubs such as Ajax Amsterdam (Netherlands), Al Nasser (Saudi Arabia), Penarol (Uruguay), Fortuna Düsseldorf. FC (Germany), Queens Park Rangers (England), etc. UN - "Football For The Goal" Members

== Stadium and locations ==
Coordinates	Location	Stadium	Year
7°01′13″N 100°28′18″E	Songkhla	Chira Nakhon Stadium	2017–2018
6°55′05″N 100°27′26″E	Songkhla	Southern Major City Stadium	2019–present

== Season by season record ==
Season	League									FA Cup	League Cup	Top goalscorer	
Season	Division	P	W	D	L	F	A	Pts	Pos	FA Cup	League Cup	Name	Goals
Hatyai City F.C.
2017	TA South	2	1	1	0	3	1	3	1st	Not Enter	Can't Enter	Pichet Warin; Panya Khunpech; Thikhamporn Ruangkul	1
2018	T4 South	21	6	7	8	24	27	25	5th	QR	QR2	(Thailand) Teerawat Durnee	6
2019	T4 South	24	8	4	12	31	34	28	4th	QR	QR2	(Thailand) Apdussalam Saman	8
Young Singh Hatyai United F.C.
2021–22	T3 South	24	7	6	11	18	23	27	9th	Not enter	QR2	(Thailand) Nuttakorn Khunjarern	4
2022–23	T3 South	22	10	6	6	40	22	36	3rd	Not enter	R1	(Republic of the Congo) Burnel Okana-Stazi	9
