= Pongpet Thongklet =

Thai footballer (born 1995)

Personal information
- Full name: Pongpet Thongklet
- Date of birth: 7 September 1995 (age 31)
- Place of birth: Chiang Mai, Thailand
- Height: 1.77 m (5 ft 9 1/2 in)
- Position: Forward

Youth career
- 2011–2013: Buriram United

Senior career*
Years	Team	Apps	(Gls)
2014–2015	Buriram United	0	(0)
2014–2015	→ Phichit (loan)		
2015–2017	Ubon UMT United	0	(0)
2015	→ Amnat United (loan)		
2017	→ Yasothon (loan)		
2018	BGC		
2019	JL Chiangmai United		
- * Club domestic league appearances and goals

Pongpet Thongklet (Thai: ป้องเพชร ทองเกล็ด, born September 7, 1995), simply known as Jib (Thai: จิ๊บ), is a Thai professional footballer who currently plays for Ubon UMT United in the Thai League 1.
