= Thierry Ratsimbazafy =

Malagasy footballer

Personal information
- Full name: Heritiana Thierry Ratsimbazafy
- Date of birth: 21 September 1986 (age 40)
- Place of birth: Madagascar
- Position: Midfielder

Senior career*
Years	Team	Apps	(Gls)
–2008	Academie Ny Antsika		
2009–2011	JS Gauloise		
2012–2014	Rajpracha		
2015	Samut Songkhram		
2016–2020	Nonthaburi		

International career
2007–2008	Madagascar	6	(0)
- * Club domestic league appearances and goals

Heritiana Thierry Ratsimbazafy (born 21 September 1986) is a Malagasy former footballer who played as a midfielder.

== Career ==
Ratsimbazafy started his career with Malagasy side Academie Ny Antsika, helping them win the league, their only major trophy. Before the 2009 season, he signed for JS Gauloise in Reunion. Before the 2015 season, Ratsimbazafy signed for Thai second tier club Samut Songkhram. Before the 2016 season, he signed for Nonthaburi in the Thai third tier.
