= Guy Hubert =

Malagasy footballer

Personal information
- Full name: Guy Hubert Mamihasindrahona
- Date of birth: 25 August 1978 (age 48)
- Place of birth: Antananarivo, Madagascar
- Height: 1.75 m (5 ft 9 in)
- Position: Center back

Youth career
- 1997–2000: Kintan Atsimo Toliara

Senior career*
Years	Team	Apps	(Gls)
2001–2002	Voromaherin Alaotra	24	(0)
2003–2006	Zatovo Milalao Antsinanana	73	(7)
2007–2008	AS Adema	51	(8)
2008–2010	BEC Tero Sasana	56	(3)
2011–2012	Sisaket	16	(0)
2013–2014	Samut Songkhram	68	(8)
2015	Saraburi	8	(1)
2015	Udon Thani	7	(0)
2016	Samutsongkhram	14	(0)
2017–2018	Samut Sakhon	24	(0)
2019	BTU United	26	(0)
2020	Nara United	0	(0)
2022–2023	Phatthalung	22	(1)
2023–2024	Chachoengsao Hi-Tek	17	(5)
Total		406	(33)

International career^{‡}
2007–2010	Madagascar	13	(1)
- * Club domestic league appearances and goals as of 01:51, 11 September 2026 (UTC) ‡ National team caps and goals as of 10:24, 9 September 2017 (UTC)

Guy Hubert Mamihasindrahona (born 25 August 1979 in Antananarivo) is a Malagasy retired footballer.

== International career ==
Hubert represented the Madagascar national football team from 2007 to 2010.
