= Burnel Okana-Stazi =

Congolese footballer

Burnel Okana
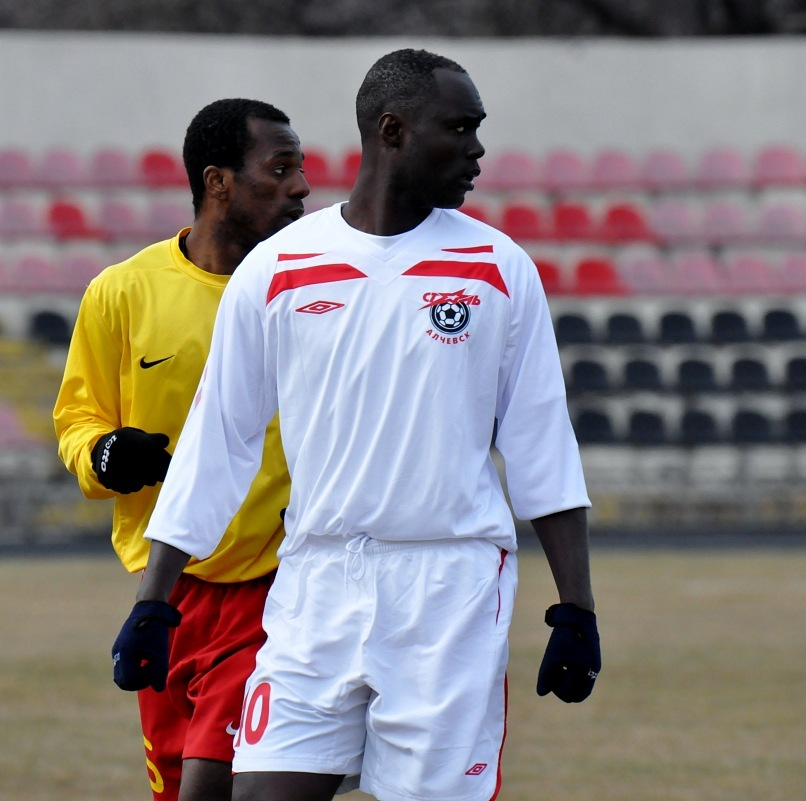
- Okana-Stazi with Stal Alchevsk

Personal information
- Date of birth: July 10, 1983 (age 43)
- Place of birth: Gamboma, Republic of the Congo
- Height: 1.79 m (5 ft 10 in)
- Position: Striker

Youth career
- Sochaux

Senior career*
Years	Team	Apps	(Gls)
2005–2013	Stal Alchevsk	169	(38)
2013–2014	Lanexang intra	6	(4)
2014–2016	EDL FC	10	(11)
2017–2019	Ranong United	26	(9)
2020–2021	Bankhai United	16	(18)
2021–2022	Wat Bot City	18	(10)
2022	Young Singh Hatyai United	11	(9)
2023	Pattani	11	(6)
2023	Angthong	10	(5)
2024	Bankhai United	22	(14)
2024	PT Satun	11	(4)

International career^{‡}
2008–2011	Republic of the Congo	14	(1)
- * Club domestic league appearances and goals as of 24 November 2024 ‡ National team caps and goals as of 15 December 2010

Burnel Okana-Stazi (born July 10, 1983, in Gamboma) is a Congolese football player.

== Career ==
In 2005, he moved to FC Stal Alchevsk. After two and a half seasons with FC Stal Alchevsk he left the club, before he returning in June 2009. In 2014, he left Ukrainian club and went free agent but soon he had some trials in different countries include Uzbekistan Premier League side Mash’al Mubarek but could not get contract because of knee injury. After a half-year without a club Okana Stazi has signed one-year contract for Lao Premier League club Lane Xang Intra F.C.after he signed one more contract with EDL FC the Current team.

== International career ==
Okana-Stazi made his first cap for Congo national football team in the World Cup qualifying match against Mali on 7 September 2008.
