= Thai League 4 =

National football league

- Organising body: Thai League
- Founded: 2006
- Folded: 2020
- Country: Thailand
- Confederation: AFC
- Promotion to: Thai League 3
- Relegation to: Thailand Amateur League
- Last champions: Wat Bot City

Thai League 4 (Thai: ไทยลีก 4), commonly known as the T4, was the fourth level association football league in Thailand. In 2009, it was divided into five groups by geographic region. Each group contained 16 clubs except for the Southern Region group which contained 13 clubs. It was sponsored by AIS and therefore officially known as the AIS Regional League Division 2. In 2016, Khor Royal Cup became a trophy for Regional League Division 2.

In 2017, Football Association of Thailand rebranded the league to Thai League 4.

== League history ==
The 3rd Level League was formed in 2006 with ten member clubs. The league was created so that clubs from regional leagues could come together and play in a national league with the onus being on promotion and relegation so clubs could easily move up the Thai football system ladder depending on performances on the football pitch rather than performances behind the scenes.

The league was also created so it would combat against the rival Provincial League. With future growth moving the Pro League to join the 2nd Division.

The league suffered another contraction after 2016 season, as 31 teams joined the newly created Thai League Championship. It also moved a tier down the pyramid, making it 4th Level League since 2017.

In 2006, the first season, ten clubs played each other twice, with promotion going to the championship winner Chula-Sinthana FC. No relegation occurred in 2006.

In 2007, the league was expanded to twelve clubs, with the top two in the championship achieving promotion (Mueang Thong NongJork United and PTT FC) and the bottom two clubs getting relegated (Thai Christian Sports Club and Thai Department of Agriculture).

In 2008, although two clubs were relegated at the end of the 2007 season, the league was again expanded the following year, to 22 clubs. Two groups would be created: 11 clubs in Group A and 11 clubs in Group B.

At the end of the season, two clubs from each group would be promoted with the league receiving four relegated teams from the Thailand Division 1 League. At the end of the season, the four clubs who achieved promotion would play off in an end of year competition to determine the overall league winner.

No clubs would be relegated due to re-structuring of the league system again for the 2009 season. But all clubs who wish to play at this level were asked to re-submit to the league and each club would be graded such items as club structure and ground stadium. Each club was expected to have certain criteria in place to achieve league status.

In 2009, 52 clubs played Division 2 League which was combined with Provincial League by Football Association of Thailand. The league was again split from two groups into five groups covering the North of Thailand, North East (Isan) region, Central East Zone, Bangkok central zone and South of Thailand. The league was also renamed as the Regional League Division 2. Five group winners would enter a championship round to determine which three teams would gain promotion to the Thai Division 1 League. Rajpracha duly won the championship stage and were promoted with Chiangrai United of the Northern League and Narathiwat of the Southern League.

75 teams were confirmed to play in the Regional League for the 2010 season. The number of teams in each region were as follows: North Region - 16 Teams, North East Region - 16 Teams, Central Region - 16 Teams, Southern Region - 14 Teams, Bangkok Region - 13 Teams

Four teams would automatically be promoted to Division 1. The four promoted teams would be decided by two mini leagues at the conclusion of the regular season. The total number of teams competing in the mini leagues will be 12, they will be made up of the top two from each league with the best two third placed teams from the Northern, North-east and Central-East leagues The top two from each mini league will gain promotion. The sides coming in third and fourth position in the mini leagues would again play playoff matches against the bottom four clubs of Division 1 in order to gain promotion.

94 teams were confirmed to play in the Regional League for the 2016 season. The number of teams in each region were as follows: North Region - 12 Teams, North East Region - 14 Teams, East Region - 12 Teams, West Region - 12 Teams, South Region - 12 Teams, Bangkok Region - 11 Teams, Bangkok-East Region - 10 Teams, Central Region - 11 Teams

In 2017, FA Thailand rebranded the Regional League as Thai League 4 and separated it into six zones: the northern region, northeastern region, eastern region, western region, Bangkok metropolitan region and southern region.

In 2020, due to the COVID-19 pandemic, the season was postponed to start in late 2020 and end in early 2021. In addition, the Thai League 4 had combined with the Thai League 3 and will compete as Thai League 3 as of this season.

== Promotion and relegation ==
=== 2008 promotion and relegation ===
The top two sides at the end of the 2008 season from A & B will be promoted to Thai Division 1 League. No teams would be relegated due to a re-structuring process.

=== 2009 promotion and relegation ===
The league winner of the five groups (North-east, Northern, Central & East, Bangkok Metropolitan, Southern) entered a final round group, Regional League Championships 2009, played on a home and away basis. The top three teams of this championship group will achieve promotion to Thai Division 1 League. No teams would be relegated.

=== 2010 promotion and relegation ===
The league winners and runners up of the five regional groups (North-east, Northern, Central & East, Bangkok Metropolitan, Southern) along with the two best third placed teams from the North, North-east and Central/East would enter the championships stage. From here, the top two teams from two groups of five would be promoted, the teams finishing in third and fourth place would enter another round of playoffs with the bottom four clubs of the 2010 Thai Division 1 League to determine if any more clubs would be promoted. No teams would be relegated.

=== 2016 promotion and relegation ===
The league winners and runners up of the eight regional groups (16 team) entered a final round group Regional League Championships Knockout 3 team best promotion to the Thai Division 1 League and 4-5 team best of the eight regional Promotion to the Thai League Championship. Team worst of the eight regional groups (8 team) relegated to the Thai Football Division 3.

=== 2017 promotion and relegation ===
The league winners of the six regional groups and runners up of North-east, Central, East, Bangkok Metropolitan and third place of North-east and playoff winner with runners up of Northern-Southern (12 teams) entered the Champions League Knockout stage, The best five team in this stage will promoted to Thai League 3. Team worst of all regional groups relegated to the Thailand Amateur League.

== Champions history ==
=== Champions of the third tier Thai football league system (Division 2) ===
| # | Season | Number of teams | Winner | Runner up | Third place | Fourth Place |
|---|---|---|---|---|---|---|
| 1 | 2006 | 10 | Chula-Sinthana | | | |
| 2 | 2007 | 12 | Muangthong United | PTT | Prachinburi | |
| 3 | 2008 | 22 | Prachinburi | Army Welfare Department | Songkhla | |
| 4 | 2009 | 52 | Raj Pracha-Nonthaburi | Chiangrai United | Narathiwat | |
| 5 | 2010 | 75 | Songkhla United | Phuket | Chiangmai | Chainat |
| 6 | 2011 | 77 | Ratchaburi | Nakhon Ratchasima | Phattalung | Krabi |
| 7 | 2012 | 81 | Ayutthaya | Trat | Rayong | Rayong United |
| 8 | 2013 | 84 | Roi Et United | Chiang Mai | Phitsanulok | Angthong |
| 9 | 2014 | 83 | Prachuap Khiri Khan | Thai Honda | Sukhothai | Phichit |
| 10 | 2015 | 83 | Ubon UMT United | Satun United | Khonkaen United | Rayong |
| 11 | 2016 | 94 | Trat | Kasetsart | Nongbua Pitchaya | Surat Thani |

=== Champions of the fourth tier Thai football league system (Thai League 4) ===
| # | Season | Number of teams | Promoted (Group A winners) | Promoted (Group B winners) | Promoted |
|---|---|---|---|---|---|
| 12 | 2017 | 61 | BTU United | JL Chiangmai United | Chiangrai City, Marines Eureka, Muangkan United |
| # | Season | Number of teams | Winner | Runner up | Promoted |
| 13 | 2018 | 57 | Nakhon Pathom United | Khon Kaen United | North Bangkok University |
| 14 | 2019 | 60 | Wat Bot City | Pattani | Muang Loei United, Pathumthani University |

=== Regional league winners ===
- Broken down into regional leagues which started in 2009

| Region | Winner | Runner up |
2009 season
| Bangkok Metropolitan Region | Raj Pracha-Nonthaburi | Kasem Bundit University |
| Central & Eastern Region | Samut Prakan | Ayutthaya |
| North Eastern Region | Loei City | Nakhon Ratchasima |
| Northern Region | Chiangrai United | Phichit |
| Southern Region | Narathiwat | Satun |
2010 season
| Bangkok Metropolitan Region | Bangkok | Rangsit University JW |
| Central & Eastern Region | Saraburi | Samut Prakan |
| North Eastern Region | Loei City | Songkhla United |
| Northern Region | Chiangmai | Chainat |
| Southern Region | Phuket | Trang |
2011 season
| Bangkok Metropolitan Region | Kasetsart | North Bangkok College |
| Central & Eastern Region | Ratchaburi | Rayong |
| North Eastern Region | Roi Et United | Loei City |
| Northern Region | Phitsanulok | Lamphun Warrior |
| Southern Region | Krabi | Phattalung |
2012 season
| Bangkok Metropolitan Region | Thai Honda | Rayong United |
| Central & Eastern Region | Ayutthaya | Rayong |
| North Eastern Region | Roi Et United | Sisaket United F.C. |
| Northern Region | Chiangmai | Phitsanulok |
| Southern Region | Trang | Pattani |
2013 season
| Bangkok Metropolitan Region | Paknampho NSRU | Kasetsart University |
| Central & Eastern Region | Look Isan-Thai Airways | Nakhon Nayok |
| Central & Western Region | Ang Thong | Prachuap |
| North Eastern Region | Roi Et United | Udon Thani |
| Northern Region | Chiangmai | Phitsanulok |
| Southern Region | Nara United | Chumphon |
2014 season
| Bangkok Metropolitan Region | Thai Honda | BCC Tero |
| Central & Eastern Region | Prachinburi United | Maptaphut Rayong |
| Central & Western Region | Hua Hin | Phetchaburi |
| North Eastern Region | Ubon UMT | Udon Thani |
| Northern Region | Sukhothai | Phichit |
| Southern Region | Prachuap Khiri Khan | Satun United |
2015 season
| Bangkok Metropolitan Region | Customs United | Chamchuri United |
| Central & Eastern Region | Rayong | Cha Choeng Sao |
| Central & Western Region | Samut Sakhon | Thonburi City |
| North Eastern Region | Khonkaen United | Ubon UMT United |
| Northern Region | Lampang | Chiangrai City |
| Southern Region | Satun United | Pattani |
2016 season
| Bangkok Metropolitan Region | Chamchuri United | Kasetsart |
| Bangkok & Eastern Region | Raj Pracha | Customs United |
| Central Region | Ayutthaya Warrior | Ayutthaya |
| Eastern Region | Trat | Cha Choeng Sao |
| Western Region | Samut Sakhon | Krung Thonburi |
| North Eastern Region | Udon Thani | Ubon Ratchathani |
| Northern Region | Nongbua Pitchaya | Kamphaengphet |
| Southern Region | Surat Thani | Nara United |
2017 season
| Bangkok Metropolitan Region | North Bangkok University | Samut Prakan |
| Eastern Region | Chanthaburi | Marines Eureka |
| Western Region | Suphanburi B | Muangkan United |
| North Eastern Region | Sisaket United | Chaiyaphum United |
| Northern Region | JL Chiangmai United | Chiangrai City |
| Southern Region | Satun United | Phuket |
2018 season
| Bangkok Metropolitan Region | North Bangkok University | Bangkok United U-23 |
| Eastern Region | Bankhai United | Chanthaburi |
| Western Region | Nakhon Pathom United | IPE Samut Sakhon United |
| North Eastern Region | Muang Loei United | Khonkaen United |
| Northern Region | Uttaradit | Nan |
| Southern Region | Satun United | Pattani |
2019 season
| Bangkok Metropolitan Region | Muangthong United (ฺB) | Bangkok United (ฺB) |
| Eastern Region | Bankhai United | Kohkwang |
| Western Region | Hua Hin City | Chainat United |
| North Eastern Region | Muang Loei United | Huai Thalaeng United |
| Northern Region | Uttaradit | Wat Bot City |
| Southern Region | Satun United | Pattani |

== See also ==
- Football records in Thailand
