= 2011 Regional League Division 2 Southern Region =

Regional League South Division
- Season: 2011
- Champions: Krabi
- Matches: 156
- Goals: 393 (2.52 per match)

2011 Regional League Division 2 League Southern Region is the 3rd season of the League competition since its establishment in 2009. It is in the third tier of the Thai football league system.

== Changes from last season ==
=== Team changes ===
==== Promoted club ====
Phuket were promoted to the 2011 Thai Division 1 League.

==== Relegated club ====
Narathiwat were relegated from the 2010 Thai Division 1 League.

== Teams ==
=== Stadia and locations ===
Locations of the Regional League South Teams

Team	Location	Stadium	Capacity	Ref.
Chumphon	Chumphon	Institute of Physical Education Chumphon Campus Stadium	?	
Hat Yai	Songkhla	Jiranakorn Stadium	25,000	
Krabi	Krabi	Krabi Province Stadium Institute of Physical Education Krabi Campus Stadium	3,590 ?	
Nakhon Si Thammarat	Nakhon Si Thammarat	Nakhon Si Thammarat Province Stadium	4,744	
Nara United	Narathiwat	Narathiwat Province Stadium	?	
Pattani	Pattani	Rainbow Stadium	8,000	
Phang Nga	Phang Nga	Phang Nga Province Stadium	3,000	
Phattalung	Phattalung	Phattalung Province Stadium	4,021	
Ranong	Ranong	Ranong Province Stadium	7,212	
Satun United	Satun	Satun Provincial Administrative Organization Stadium	4,671	
Surat	Surat Thani	Surat Thani Province Stadium	10,175	
Trang	Trang	Trang Municipality Stadium	4,789	
Yala	Yala	Institute of Physical Education Yala Campus Stadium	?	

== League table ==
Pos	Team	Pld	W	D	L	GF	GA	GD	Pts	Qualification
1	Krabi (C, Q)	24	14	7	3	37	22	+15	49	Champions League Round
2	Phattalung (Q)	24	13	8	3	43	14	+29	47	Champions League Round
3	Pattani	24	13	5	6	30	20	+10	44	
4	Hat Yai	24	12	5	7	38	28	+10	41	
5	Phang Nga	24	9	8	7	32	30	+2	35	
6	Satun United	24	10	4	10	31	32	−1	34	
7	Ranong	24	9	6	9	20	24	−4	33	
8	Narathiwat	24	8	8	8	35	23	+12	32	
9	Chumphon	24	9	4	11	25	30	−5	31	
10	Surat	24	8	4	12	34	31	+3	28	
11	Trang	24	5	9	10	33	36	−3	24	
12	Yala	24	5	3	16	18	52	−34	18	
13	Nakhon Si Thammarat	24	3	5	16	17	51	−34	14	

Rules for classification: 1) points; 2) head-to-head points; 3) head-to-head goal difference; 4) head-to-head goals scored; 5) goal difference; 6) number of goals scored.
(C) Champions; (Q) Qualified for the phase indicated
