= 2010 Regional League Division 2 Southern Region =

Regional League Southern Region
- Season: 2010
- Champions: Phuket
- Matches played: 156
- Goals scored: 385 (2.47 per match)
- Biggest home win: Phuket 5-0 Ranong (3 April 2010); Pattani 6-1 Surat Thani (19 June 2010); Surat Thani 6-1 Yala (5 September 2010)
- Biggest away win: Nakhon Si Thammarat 1-4 Phuket (22 August 2010)
- Highest scoring: Pattani 6-1 Surat Thani (19 June 2010); Surat Thani 6-1 Yala (5 September 2010) (7 goals)

2010 Regional League Division 2 Southern Region is the 2nd season of the League competition since its establishment in 2009. It is in the third tier of the Thai football league system. The league has been expanded from 8 clubs in 2009 to 14 clubs this season. The league winners and runners up will qualify for the 2010 Regional League Division 2 championship stage.

== Changes from last season ==
=== Team changes ===
==== Promoted clubs ====
Narathiwat were promoted to the 2010 Thai Division 1 League after coming 3rd in the 2009 Regional League Division 2 championship pool.

==== Relegated clubs ====
Surat Thani were relegated from the 2009 Thai Division 1 League after finishing the season in 14th place.

==== Relocated clubs ====
Prachuap Khiri Khan re-located from the Regional League Central-East Division 2009 into the Southern Division.

==== Expansion clubs ====
Trang, Ranong, Phang Nga, Chumphon and Hat Yai joined the newly expanded league setup.

==== Withdrawn clubs ====
Prachuap Khiri Khan pulled out citing insufficient budget and concerns about safety before the season commenced. They had just been relocated from the Regional League Central-East Division.

== Teams ==
=== Stadia and locations ===
Locations of the Regional League South Teams

Team	Location	Stadium	Capacity	Ref.
Chumphon	Chumphon	Chumphon Province Stadium	3,000	
Hat Yai	Hat Yai	Jiranakorn Stadium	25,000	
Krabi	Krabi	Krabi Provincial Stadium	3,590	
Nakhon Si Thammarat	Nakhon Si Thammarat	PAO. Nakhon Si Thammarat Stadium (Ron Phibun District)	4,744	
Pattani	Pattani	Pattani Province Stadium	8,000	
Phang Nga	Phang Nga	Phang Nga Provincial Administrative Organization Stadium	3,000	
Phattalung	Phattalung	Phattalung Province Stadium	4,021	
F.C. Phuket	Phuket	Surakul Stadium	15,000	
Ranong	Ranong	Ranong Province Stadium	1,000	
Satun	Satun	Satun Province Stadium	?	
Surat Thani	Surat Thani	Surat Thani Province Stadium	10,175	
Trang	Trang	Trang Province Stadium	4,789	
Yala	Yala	Yala Province Stadium	2,960	

== League table ==
Pos	Team	Pld	W	D	L	GF	GA	GD	Pts	Qualification
1	F.C. Phuket (C)	24	17	4	3	51	18	+33	55	Qualification for Champions League Round
2	Trang	24	11	8	5	30	23	+7	41	Qualification for Champions League Round
3	Ranong	24	10	8	6	31	29	+2	38 (Note: RAN 2–0 STU; STU 0–1 RAN)	
4	Satun	24	10	8	6	33	27	+6	38	
5	Surat Thani	24	10	6	8	36	36	0	36	
6	Krabi	24	10	5	9	33	32	+1	35	
7	Pattani	24	8	7	9	28	28	0	31	
8	Phang Nga	24	8	6	10	23	26	−3	30	
9	Yala	24	7	7	10	20	22	−2	28	
10	Phattalung	24	6	8	10	25	33	−8	26	
11	Nakhon Si Thammarat	24	6	6	12	31	46	−15	24	
12	Hat Yai	24	4	11	9	22	26	−4	23	
13	Chumphon	24	4	6	14	22	39	−17	18	

Rules for classification: 1) points; 2) head-to-head points; 3) head-to-head goal difference; 4) head-to-head goals scored; 5) goal difference; 6) number of goals scored.
(C) Champions
Notes:

2010 Thai Division 2 League
Southern Region winners
Phuket
1st title

== Results ==
Home \ Away	CHM	HYA	KRB	NST	PTT	PNG	PHT	PHK	RAN	STU	STH	TRG	YAL
Chumphon		2–2	0–2	0–1	3–1	0–1	1–3	1–1	1–2	0–0	1–0	0–0	0–1
Hat Yai	0–1		1–1	4–2	0–1	0–1	3–3	0–0	1–1	0–1	1–0	1–2	2–0
Krabi	1–0	0–3		5–1	2–1	0–0	1–2	3–2	0–2	1–1	1–1	2–2	2–1
Nakhon Si Thammarat	3–1	0–0	2–1		0–1	3–2	0–1	1–4	2–2	0–2	2–0	1–1	3–0
Pattani	1–1	1–1	1–2	4–1		1–0	1–0	1–3	0–0	1–1	6–1	1–0	0–1
Phang Nga	2–1	0–0	0–1	2–1	1–0		4–0	1–1	2–1	1–2	2–3	0–0	0–0
Phattalung	2–0	2–2	1–2	1–1	1–0	2–1		0–2	1–1	1–1	1–1	1–2	0–0
F.C. Phuket	5–1	2–0	2–1	3–1	3–0	2–1	2–0		5–0	2–0	2–0	2–0	0–2
Ranong	1–2	1–1	3–2	1–1	2–0	1–1	1–0	1–2		2–0	4–2	1–3	1–0
Satun	4–2	2–0	2–1	4–2	1–1	2–0	3–1	1–2	0–1		0–2	2–2	2–1
Surat Thani	3–2	0–0	1–0	2–2	2–2	2–0	1–0	1–3	3–1	3–1		0–0	6–1
Trang	2–1	1–0	3–1	2–1	2–2	0–1	2–1	2–1	0–1	1–1	1–2		1–0
Yala	1–1	2–0	0–1	3–0	0–1	3–0	1–1	0–0	0–0	0–0	3–0	0–1	

Updated to match(es) played on unknown. Source: Football Association of Thailand website
Legend: Blue = home team win; Yellow = draw; Red = away team win.
