= 2018 Thai League 4 Southern Region =

Thai football league season

Thai League 4 Southern Region
- Season: 2018
- Champions: Satun United
- Relegated: Chumphon
- Matches played: 84
- Goals scored: 225 (2.68 per match)
- Top goalscorer: (Madagascar) Dimitri Carlos Zozimar (Brazil) Martins Caio Henrique (10 goals)
- Biggest home win: 5 goals difference Satun United 5–0 Chumphon (5 May 2018)
- Biggest away win: 4 goals difference Surat Thani City 0–4 Satun United (3 March 2018)
- Highest scoring: 8 goals Satun United 6–2 Pattani (1 July 2018)
- Longest winning run: 4 matches Satun United; Pattani
- Longest unbeaten run: 12 matches Satun United
- Longest winless run: 11 matches Chumphon
- Longest losing run: 3 matches Chumphon; Phattalung
- Highest attendance: 4,004; Satun United 1–0 Pattani (25 August 2018)
- Lowest attendance: 38; Hatyai 1–0 Surat Thani City (25 August 2018)
- Total attendance: 40,864
- Average attendance: 504
- All statistics correct as of 25 August 2018.

2018 Thai League 4 Southern Region is the 9th season of the League competition since its establishment in 2009. It is in the fourth tier of the Thai football league system.

== Changes from Last Season ==
=== Promoted Clubs ===
Promoted from the 2017 Thailand Amateur League Southern Region

- Hatyai City

=== Relegated Clubs ===
Relegated to the 2018 Thailand Amateur League Southern Region

- Sungaipadee

=== Expansion Clubs ===
- Yala United Club-licensing football club didn't pass to play 2018 Thai League 4 Southern Region. This team is banned 2 years and Relegated to 2020 Thailand Amateur League Southern Region.

==== Reserving Clubs ====
- Krabi U-23 is Krabi Reserving this team which join Southern Region first time.

== Teams ==
=== Stadium and locations ===
Locations of the 2018 Thai League 4 Southern Region

Team	Location	Stadium	Capacity
Chumphon	Chumphon	Chumphon Provincial Stadium	3,000
Hat Yai	Songkhla	Southern Major City Stadium, Phru Kang Kao	1,000
Hatyai City	Songkhla	Chira Nakhon Stadium	25,000
Krabi U-23	Krabi	Krabi Provincial Stadium	6,000
Pattani	Pattani	Rainbow Stadium	8,000
Phattalung	Phattalung	Phattalung Provincial Stadium	8,000
Satun United	Satun	Satun PAO. Stadium	5,000
Surat Thani City	Surat Thani	Ban Song Municipality Stadium	1,000

=== Foreign players ===
Other foreign players.
AFC quota players.
ASEAN quota players.
No foreign player registered.

A T4 team could registered five foreign players by at least one player from AFC member countries and at least one player from ASEAN member countries. A team can use four foreign players on the field in each game, including at least one player from the AFC member countries or ASEAN member countries (3+1).

Note :
(substituted off) : players who released during summer transfer window;
(substituted in) : players who registered during summer transfer window;
↔: players who have dual nationality by half-caste or naturalization.

Club	Leg	Player 1	Player 2	Player 3	Player 4	Player 5
Chumphon	1st					
Chumphon	2nd					
Hatyai	1st					
Hatyai	2nd					
Hatyai City	1st					
Hatyai City	2nd	(Cameroon) Nsapit Mountapbene Henri Joel (substituted in)	(Ivory Coast) Ben Ibrahim Ouattara (substituted in)	(Ivory Coast) Michel Ange Boka (substituted in)		
Krabi (B)	1st	(Brazil) ↔ (Vietnam) Kesley Alves (substituted off)	(Chile) ↔ (Palestine) Matías Jadue (substituted off)	(Japan) Ryohei Maeda (substituted off)	(Brazil) Victor Amaro	(Ivory Coast) Koné Seydou
Krabi (B)	2nd		(Montenegro) Ivan Vuković (substituted in)	(South Korea) Kim Gwi-hyeon (substituted in)	(Brazil) Victor Amaro	(Ivory Coast) Koné Seydou
Pattani	1st		(Ghana) Issah Adamu	(Madagascar) Carlos	(France) ↔ (Laos) Mitsada Saitaifah	
Pattani	2nd	(South Korea) Lee Hyeong-gi (substituted in)	(Ghana) Issah Adamu	(Madagascar) Carlos	(France) ↔ (Laos) Mitsada Saitaifah	
Phattalung	1st	(Japan) Kosuke Asoko (substituted off)	(Ivory Coast) Cherif Mamy	(Cameroon) Beng Abel Marcel	(Ghana) Obamoe Daniel	
Phattalung	2nd		(Ivory Coast) Cherif Mamy	(Cameroon) Beng Abel Marcel	(Ghana) Obamoe Daniel	
Satun United	1st	(Cameroon) Yannick Patrice (substituted off)	(Brazil) Caio Henrique	(Brazil) Caio Rodrigues	(South Korea) Yoo Chang-soo	
Satun United	2nd	(Brazil) Fabricio Marabá (substituted in)	(Brazil) Caio Henrique	(Brazil) Caio Rodrigues	(South Korea) Yoo Chang-soo	
Surat Thani City	1st	(Republic of the Congo) Itubu Kevin (substituted off)	(Iran) Hossein Doustdarsefidimazgi (substituted off)	(Ivory Coast) Diarrassouba Hamed	(Iran) Ramin Sadeghi	
Surat Thani City	2nd	(Brazil) Vinicius Silva Freitas (substituted in)	(Nigeria) Emmanuel Nwachi (substituted in)	(Ivory Coast) Diarrassouba Hamed	(Iran) Ramin Sadeghi	

== League table ==
Pos	Team	Pld	W	D	L	GF	GA	GD	Pts	Qualification or relegation
1	Satun United (C, Q)	21	13	7	1	52	20	+32	46	Qualification to Group Stage round of Thai League 4 Champions League
2	Pattani (Q)	21	11	7	3	34	22	+12	40	Qualification to Play-off round of Thai League 4 Champions League
3	Hatyai (Q)	21	7	9	5	28	24	+4	30	Qualification to Preliminary round 1 of Thai League 4 Champions League
4	Krabi U-23	21	8	5	8	25	25	0	29	
5	Hatyai City	21	6	7	8	24	27	−3	25	
6	Surat Thani City	21	4	7	10	18	31	−13	19	
7	Phattalung	21	3	8	10	21	35	−14	17 (Note: Phattalung ahead on head-to-head record; Phattalung 5 points, Chumphon 2 points)	
8	Chumphon (R)	21	3	8	10	24	41	−17	17	Relegation to the 2019 Thailand Amateur League

Updated to match(es) played on 25 August 2018. Source: Thai League 4
Rules for classification: 1) Points; 2) Head-to-head points; 3) Head-to-head goals difference; 4) Head-to-head goals scored; 5) Overall goals difference; 6) Overall goals scored; 7) Fair play points; 8) Play-off without extra time;).
(C) Champions; (Q) Qualified for the phase indicated; (R) Relegated

=== Positions by round ===
Leader and qualification for Thai League 4 Champions League
Qualification for Thai League 4 Champions League Play-offs
Relegation to the 2018 Thai Football Amateur Tournament

The table lists the positions of teams after each week of matches. In order to preserve chronological evolvements, any postponed matches are not included in the round at which they were originally scheduled, but added to the full round they were played immediately afterwards. For example, if a match is scheduled for matchday 13, but then postponed and played between days 16 and 17, it will be added to the standings for day 16.

Team ╲ Round	1	2	3	4	5	6	7	8	9	10	11	12	13	14	15	16	17	18	19	20	21
Satun United	1	1	1	1	1	1	1	1	1	1	1	1	1	1	1	1	1	1	1	1	1
Pattani	3	2	2	2	2	2	2	2	3	2	2	2	2	2	2	2	2	2	2	2	2
Hatyai	2	3	3	4	4	4	4	4	4	4	4	4	3	4	4	4	3	4	4	4	3
Krabi (B)	4	5	4	3	3	3	3	3	2	3	3	3	4	3	3	3	4	3	3	3	4
Hatyai City	8	6	6	6	7	6	6	6	6	7	6	5	5	5	6	6	6	5	5	5	5
Surat Thani City	7	7	7	8	6	7	7	7	7	6	8	8	7	6	5	5	7	7	7	6	6
Phattalung	6	8	8	7	8	8	8	8	8	8	7	7	8	8	8	8	5	6	6	7	7
Chumphon	5	4	5	5	5	5	5	5	5	5	5	6	6	7	7	7	8	8	8	8	8

Source: Thai League 4

=== Results by round ===
Team ╲ Round	1	2	3	4	5	6	7	8	9	10	11	12	13	14	15	16	17	18	19	20	21
Satun United	W	W	W	W	D	W	D	W	D	W	W	D	L	W	W	D	W	W	D	D	W
Pattani	W	W	W	W	D	D	D	D	L	W	D	W	W	L	D	W	D	W	W	W	L
Hatyai	W	D	D	L	D	L	W	D	D	W	D	D	W	L	W	D	W	L	L	D	W
Krabi (B)	W	L	D	W	D	W	W	D	W	L	L	D	L	W	W	L	L	W	D	L	L
Hatyai City	L	D	L	D	L	W	L	L	D	L	W	W	D	L	L	D	D	W	D	W	W
Surat Thani City	L	L	D	L	W	L	L	D	D	D	L	L	W	W	D	D	L	L	D	W	L
Phattalung	L	L	D	L	D	L	L	D	D	D	W	L	D	W	L	D	W	L	L	L	D
Chumphon	L	W	L	D	D	D	W	D	D	L	L	D	L	L	L	D	L	L	W	L	D

Source: Thai League 4
W = Win; D = Draw; L = Loss

== Results 1st and 2nd match for each team ==
Home \ Away	CPN	HYI	HYC	KRA	PNI	PLG	STN	STC
Chumphon		2–2	0–2	1–1	2–2	3–2	1–2	2–0
Hat Yai	1–1		1–1	1–1	1–1	0–0	2–1	1–0
Hatyai City	1–1	0–0		1–2	0–1	1–1	0–2	3–1
Krabi U-23	1–0	1–2	1–0		2–0	3–0	1–1	2–0
Pattani	3–0	2–1	1–0	2–1		2–0	1–1	1–1
Phattalung	2–1	0–3	0–1	1–0	2–2		1–1	1–1
Satun United	5–0	4–3	4–0	1–1	6–2	4–1		3–2
Surat Thani City	1–1	2–1	2–1	3–0	0–3	1–1	0–4	

Updated to match(es) played on 2 July 2018. Source: Thai League 4
Legend: Blue = home team win; Yellow = draw; Red = away team win.

== Results 3rd match for each team ==
In the third leg, the winner on head-to-head result of the first and the second leg will be home team. If head-to-head result are tie, must to find the home team from head-to-head goals different. If all of head-to-head still tie, must to find the home team from penalty kickoff on the end of each second leg match (This penalty kickoff don't bring to calculate points on league table, it's only the process to find the home team on third leg).

Home \ Away	CPN	HYI	HYC	KRA	PNI	PLG	STN	STC
Chumphon								1–1
Hat Yai	2–3			2–0		1–0	2–2	1–0
Hatyai City	3–2	1–1				2–1		0–0
Krabi U-23	2–1		2–4		0–1	3–2	1–1	
Pattani	3–0	2–0	2–2			2–1		1–1
Phattalung	2–2							
Satun United	3–0		2–1		1–0	1–1		2–0
Surat Thani City				1–0		1–2		

Updated to match(es) played on 25 August 2018. Source: Thai League 4
Legend: Blue = home team win; Yellow = draw; Red = away team win.

== Season statistics ==
=== Top scorers ===
As of 25 August 2018.

Rank	Player	Club	Goals
1	(Madagascar) Dimitri Carlos Zozimar	Pattani	10
1	(Brazil) Martins Caio Henrique	Satun United	10
3	(Thailand) Akaraphol Meesawad	Hat Yai	9
3	(Ghana) Obamoe Daniel	Phattalung	9
3	(Cameroon) Yannick Patrice Tougessong	Satun United	9
6	(Thailand) Satjaphong Samjabok	Chumphon	8
6	(Brazil) Caio	Satun United	8
8	(Thailand) Sutipong Yaifai	Chumphon	7
9	(Thailand) Teerawat Durnee	Hatyai City	6
10	(Thailand) Khoiree Layeng	Hat Yai	5
10	(Thailand) Tameezee Hayeeyusoh	Krabi U-23 (5), Krabi (1)	5
10	(Thailand) Saibudin Da-oh	Pattani	5
10	(Brazil) Fabricio Peris Carneiro	Hua Hin City (3), Satun United (2)	5

=== Hat-tricks ===
Player	For	Against	Result	Date
(Cameroon) Yannick Patrice	Satun United	Surat Thani City	4–0	3 March 2018
(Madagascar) Carlos	Pattani	Chumphon	3–0	19 August 2018

== Attendances ==
Pos	Team	Total	High	Low	Average	Change
1	Satun United	17,289	4,004	868	1,441	+25.7%
2	Pattani	6,331	1,094	177	527	−41.4%
3	Chumphon	3,150	500	100	393	−22.0%
4	Surat Thani City	3,290	700	100	365	+9.9%
5	Hatyai	3,786	880	38	316	−20.2%
6	Hatyai City	3,137	570	150	285	n/a
7	Phattalung	1,946	391	114	243	−46.9%
8	Krabi (B)	1,935	300	100	215	n/a
	League total	40,864	4,004	38	504	−25.2%

Updated to games played on 25 August 2018
Source: Thai League 4

=== Attendances by home match played ===
Team \ Match played	1	2	3	4	5	6	7	8	9	10	11	12	Total
Chumphon	500	500	500	100	500	300	350	400					3,150
Hatyai	545	300	100	880	150	430	250	120	100	73	800	38	3,786
Hatyai City	570	185	227	335	200	250	320	300	250	350	150		3,137
Krabi (B)	300	300	300	215	200	150	210	100	Unk.1	Unk.2	160	Unk.3	1,935
Pattani	984	1,000	1,094	800	350	400	210	320	177	400	345	251	6,331
Phattalung	391	200	205	300	266	114	170	300					1,946
Satun United	1,000	1,700	970	868	1,200	1,300	1,532	1,250	1,113	1,000	1,352	4,004	17,289
Surat Thani City	700	350	120	300	320	400	500	500	100				3,290

Source: Thai League 4
Note:
Unk.1 Some error of T4 official match report 15 July 2018 (Krabi (B) 0–1 Pattani).
Unk.2 Some error of T4 official match report 5 August 2018 (Krabi (B) 3–2 Phattalung).
Unk.3 Some error of T4 official match report 25 August 2018 (Krabi (B) 2–4 Hatyai City).
