= 2014 Regional League Division 2 Southern Region =

Regional League South Region
- Season: 2014
- Champions: Prachuap Khiri Khan

2014 Thai Division 2 League Southern Region is the 6th season of the League competition since its establishment in 2009. It is in the third tier of the Thai football league system.

== Changes from last season ==
=== Team changes ===
==== Promoted clubs ====
No club was promoted to the Thai Division 1 League. Last years league champions Nara United failed to qualify from the 2013 Regional League Division 2 championship pool.

=== Relocated clubs ===
Prachuap re-located to the Southern Division from the Central-West Division 2013.

== Teams ==
=== Stadium and locations ===
Locations of the 2014 Regional League South Teams

Team	Location	Stadium	Capacity	Ref.
Chumphon	Chumphon	Chumphon Province Stadium	3,000	
Hat Yai	Songkhla	Jiranakorn Stadium	25,000	
Nakhon Si Heritage	Nakhon Si Thammarat	Nakhon Si Thammarat PAO. Stadium Walailak University Stadium	4,744 ?	
Nara United	Narathiwat	Narathiwat PAO. Stadium	?	
Pattani	Pattani	Rainbow Stadium	8,000	
Phang Nga	Phang Nga	Phang Nga Province Stadium	3,000	
Phattalung	Phattalung	Phattalung PAO. Stadium	5,000	
Prachuap	Prachuap Khiri Khan	Sam Ao Stadium	7,000	
Ranong	Ranong	Ranong Province Stadium	7,212	
Satun United	Satun	Satun Province Stadium	4,671	
Surat	Surat Thani	Surat Thani Provincial Stadium	10,175	
Trang	Trang	Trang City municipality Stadium	4,789	
Yala	Yala	IPE Yala Stadium	2,960	

== League table ==
Pos	Team	Pld	W	D	L	GF	GA	GD	Pts	Qualification
1	Prachuap (C, Q)	24	15	6	3	46	19	+27	51	Champions League Round
2	Satun United (Q)	24	13	9	2	46	17	+29	48	Champions League Round
3	Trang	24	13	9	2	36	20	+16	48	
4	Chumphon	23	12	9	2	32	17	+15	45	
5	Pattani	24	10	12	2	30	16	+14	42	
6	Nara United	24	10	7	7	28	24	+4	37	
7	Surat Thani	24	6	8	10	26	40	−14	26	
8	Ranong	24	5	10	9	30	39	−9	25	
9	Yala	23	5	9	9	17	20	−3	24	
10	Phang Nga	24	5	9	10	26	40	−14	24	
11	Phattalung	22	3	8	11	23	35	−12	17	
12	Nakhon Si Heritage	22	2	7	13	18	36	−18	13	
13	Hat Yai	24	2	1	21	15	50	−35	7	

Source: ^{[usurped]}
Rules for classification: 1) points; 2) head-to-head points; 3) head-to-head goal difference; 4) head-to-head goals scored; 5) goal difference; 6) number of goals scored.
(C) Champions; (Q) Qualified for the phase indicated
