= 2017 Thai League 4 Southern Region =

Thai football league season

- Season: 2017
- Champions: Satun United
- Relegated: Sungaipadee
- Matches played: 108
- Goals scored: 242 (2.24 per match)
- Top goalscorer: (Ivory Coast) Ibrahim Dicko (14 Goals)
- Biggest home win: 5 goals Satun United 6–1 Yala United (2 July 2017)
- Biggest away win: 5 goals Sungaipadee 0–5 Phuket (19 February 2017)
- Highest scoring: 7 goals Satun United 6–1 Yala United (2 July 2017)
- Longest winning run: 7 matches Satun United
- Longest unbeaten run: 9 matches Satun United
- Longest winless run: 11 matches Sungaipadee
- Longest losing run: 9 matches Surat Thani City
- Highest attendance: 2,500; Satun United 3–1 Chumphon (3 September 2017)
- Lowest attendance: 128; Hatyai 0–1 Chumphon (23 July 2017)
- Total attendance: 70,156
- Average attendance: 674

2017 Thai League 4 Southern Region is the 8th season of the League competition since its establishment in 2009. It is in the fourth tier of the Thai football league system.

== Changes from last season ==
=== Promoted clubs ===
Four club was promoted to the 2017 Thai League 3 Southern Region.

- Surat Thani
- Nara United
- Trang
- Ranong United

=== Relegated clubs ===
- Nakhon Si Heritage were relegated to the Thailand Amateur League.

=== Relocated clubs ===
- Chumphon were moved from the Western Region 2016.
- Sinthana Kabinburi were moved from the Bangkok & Eastern 2016.

=== Renamed clubs ===
- Surat Thani City authorize from Sinthana Kabinburi

=== Withdrawn clubs ===
- Phang Nga Club-licensing football club didn't pass to play 2017 Thai League 4 Southern Region so this club is taking a 1-year break.

=== Expansion clubs ===
- Surat Thani United was promoted from the 2016 Thai Division 3 Tournament Southern Region Winner but this Club-licensing club didn't pass. Sungaipadee, which 2016 Thai Division 3 Tournament Southern Region Runner-up, was replaced this quota.

== Teams ==
=== Stadium and locations ===
Locations of the Thai League 4 Southern Region Teams

Team	Location	Stadium	Capacity
Chumphon	Chumphon	Chumphon Provincial Stadium	3,000
Hatyai	Songkhla	Southern Major City Stadium, Phru Kang Kao	1,000
Pattani	Pattani	Rainbow Stadium	8,000
Phattalung	Phattalung	Phattalung Provincial Stadium	8,000
Phuket	Phuket	Surakul Stadium	15,000
Satun United	Satun	Satun PAO. Stadium	5,000
Sungaipadee	Narathiwat	Maharaj Stadium, Su-ngai Kolok	5,000
Surat Thani City	Surat Thani	Surat Thani Provincial Stadium (Until 14 May 2017); Ban Song Municipality Stadium (Since 9 July 2017)	10,000; 1,000
Yala United	Yala	Yala Municipality Stadium, Ban Jaru	2,500

=== Sponsoring ===
Team	Kit manufacturer	Shirt sponsor
Chumphon	Cadenza	Chumphon Rangnok
Hatyai	Made by Club	PPE Build the Quality
Pattani	FBT	The Fatoni Stadium
Phattalung	Cadenza	PTG Energy
Phuket	Deffo	Royal Gems Pavilion
Satun United	Cadenza	SK ZIC
Sungaipadee	Eureka	Lt.Gen. Piyawat Nakwanich – The 4th Army Area Commander
Surat Thani City	FBT	MG Motor
Yala United	Grand Sport	Gulf

== League table ==
=== Standings ===
Pos	Team	Pld	W	D	L	GF	GA	GD	Pts	Qualification or relegation
1	Satun United (C, Q)	24	17	4	3	42	16	+26	55	Qualification to the Thai League 4 Champions League
2	Phuket	24	14	6	4	37	17	+20	48 (Note: Phuket ahead on head-to-head record; Phuket 9 pts, Pattani 0 pts.)	Qualification for Thai League 4 Champions League play-off
3	Pattani	24	15	3	6	31	18	+13	48	
4	Chumphon	24	11	5	8	24	19	+5	38	
5	Hatyai	24	8	6	10	24	29	−5	30	
6	Phattalung	24	7	8	9	18	23	−5	29	
7	Yala United	24	8	4	12	32	35	−3	28	
8	Surat Thani City	24	4	3	17	17	40	−23	15	
9	Sungaipadee (R)	24	2	5	17	17	45	−28	11	Relegation to the 2018 Thailand Amateur League

Updated to match(es) played on 9 September 2017. Source: Thai League 4
Rules for classification: 1) Points; 2) Head-to-head points; 3) Head-to-head goals difference; 4) Head-to-head goals scored; 5) Overall goals difference; 6) Overall goals scored; 7) Fair play points; 8) Play-off without extra time;).
(C) Champions; (Q) Qualified for the phase indicated; (R) Relegated

=== Positions by round ===
Leader and qualification for Thai League 4 Champions League
Qualification for Thai League 4 Champions League Play-offs
Relegation to the 2018 Thai Football Amateur Tournament

The table lists the positions of teams after each week of matches. In order to preserve chronological evolvements, any postponed matches are not included in the round at which they were originally scheduled, but added to the full round they were played immediately afterwards. For example, if a match is scheduled for matchday 13, but then postponed and played between days 16 and 17, it will be added to the standings for day 16.

Team \ Round	1	2	3	4	5	6	7	8	9	10	11	12	13	14	15	16	17	18	19	20	21	22	23	24	25	26	27
Satun United	3	3	3	2	1	1	1	1	1	1	1	1	1	1	1	1	1	1	1	1	1	1	1	1	1	1	1
Phuket	1	1	1	1	2	2	3	2	2	3	4	3	4	3	2	2	2	2	3	2	2	3	2	2	2	2	2
Pattani	4	4	6	4	5	6	5	4	3	2	2	4	3	4	3	3	3	3	2	3	4	4	4	3	3	3	3
Chumphon	2	2	2	3	3	4	6	6	5	5	3	2	2	2	4	4	4	4	4	4	3	2	3	4	4	4	4
Hatyai	8	7	7	8	7	5	4	5	6	6	7	6	6	6	6	6	7	7	7	7	7	5	5	5	6	6	5
Phattalung	6	5	5	6	4	3	2	3	4	4	5	5	5	5	5	5	5	5	5	5	5	6	6	6	5	5	6
Yala United	5	8	8	7	8	9	7	7	7	7	6	7	7	7	7	7	6	6	6	6	6	7	7	7	7	7	7
Surat Thani City	7	6	4	5	6	8	9	9	9	9	9	9	9	9	8	8	8	8	9	9	8	8	8	8	8	8	8
Sungaipadee	9	9	9	9	9	7	8	8	8	8	8	8	8	8	9	9	9	9	8	8	9	9	9	9	9	9	9

Source: Thai League 4

=== Results by match played ===
W	Won
D	Drawn
L	Lost

Team \ Match played	1	2	3	4	5	6	7	8	9	10	11	12	13	14	15	16	17	18	19	20	21	22	23	24
Satun United	W	D	D	W	W	W	D	L	W	W	W	W	W	L	W	W	W	W	W	W	W	D	W	L
Phuket	W	W	W	D	L	L	W	D	D	L	W	W	W	W	W	D	L	W	W	W	D	D	W	W
Pattani	D	D	L	W	L	W	W	W	W	D	L	W	W	W	W	L	W	L	L	W	W	W	W	W
Chumphon	W	D	D	D	D	L	D	W	W	W	W	W	L	L	L	W	W	W	W	W	L	L	L	L
Hatyai	L	D	L	D	D	W	W	L	L	D	W	L	D	W	L	L	L	W	L	W	W	L	D	W
Phattalung	D	D	D	W	W	W	D	D	L	L	W	D	L	W	L	D	L	L	L	W	L	W	D	L
Yala United	D	L	D	L	L	W	D	L	W	W	L	L	L	W	W	W	L	L	L	L	W	L	D	W
Surat Thani City	L	D	W	L	L	L	L	L	L	L	L	L	D	W	L	L	L	L	W	L	L	D	W	L
Sungaipadee	L	D	L	D	W	L	L	D	L	L	L	D	L	L	L	L	W	L	L	L	D	L	L	L

Source: Thai League 4

=== Results ===
In the third leg, the winner on head-to-head result of the first and the second leg will be home team. If head-to-head result are tie, must to find the home team from head-to-head goals different. If all of head-to-head still tie, must to find the home team from penalty kickoff on the end of each second leg match (This penalty kickoff don't bring to calculate points on league table, it's only the process to find the home team on third leg).

==== First and second legs ====
Home \ Away	CHUM	HAT	PATT	PHAT	PHU	STU	SUNG	STC	YU
Chumphon		2–0	0–1	2–0	1–2	1–2	2–0	2–1	2–1
Hatyai	0–1		1–1	0–1	3–2	1–2	0–0	0–1	1–0
Pattani	3–0	0–0		2–1	0–1	2–0	2–1	1–0	1–1
Phattalung	0–0	0–0	1–0		1–1	1–2	2–1	0–0	0–1
Phuket	0–0	1–0	1–0	1–1		1–0	0–0	3–1	2–0
Satun United	0–0	1–0	2–1	0–0	2–1		3–1	3–0	6–1
Sungaipadee	0–0	2–2	0–1	0–1	0–5	0–1		4–2	0–3
Surat Thani City	0–1	0–1	0–1	0–2	0–1	1–1	1–0		1–4
Yala United	1–1	2–3	0–1	1–1	1–0	0–1	2–1	3–2	

Updated to match(es) played on 23 July 2017. Source: Thai League 4
Legend: Blue = home team win; Yellow = draw; Red = away team win.

==== Third leg ====
Home \ Away	CHUM	HAT	PATT	PHAT	PHU	STU	SUNG	STC	YU
Chumphon		0–1		1–0			4–0	2–1	1–0
Hatyai							2–1		1–3
Pattani	1–0	2–3				2–1	3–2	3–1	1–0
Phattalung		1–3	0–1		0–2		1–0	3–1	
Phuket	2–0	1–1	2–1			1–1	1–2	3–0	3–2
Satun United	3–1	2–0		3–0			3–0	1–0	2–1
Sungaipadee								0–0	
Surat Thani City		3–1							
Yala United				1–1			4–2	0–1	

Updated to match(es) played on 9 September 2017. Source: Thai League 4
Legend: Blue = home team win; Yellow = draw; Red = away team win.

== Season statistics ==
=== Top goal scorers ===
As of 9 September 2017.

Rank	Player	Club	Goals
1	(Ivory Coast) Ibrahim Dicko	Pattani	14
2	(Thailand) Nattapoom Maya	Phuket	13
3	(Japan) Daiki Konomura	Satun United	10
4	(Nigeria) Julius Chukwuma Ononiwu	Satun United	9
4	(Thailand) Pithak Abdulraman	Yala United	9
6	(Thailand) Akkarapol Meesawat	Hatyai	8
6	(Ghana) Daniel Omaboe	Sungaipadee	8
8	(Ivory Coast) Cherif Mamy	Phattalung	7
9	(Thailand) Akarapong Pumwiset	Chumphon	6
9	(Thailand) Porncha Rodnakkaret	Phuket	6

=== Hat-tricks ===
Player	For	Against	Result	Date
(Thailand) Nattapoom Maya	Phuket	Sungaipadee	5–0	19 February 2017
(Ghana) Daniel Omaboey	Sungaipadee	Surat Thani City	4–2	25 March 2017
(Thailand) Pithak Abdulraman	Yala United	Surat Thani City	4–1	2 April 2017
(Ivory Coast) Ibrahim Dicko	Pattani	Surat Thani City	3–1	13 August 2017

== Attendance ==
=== Overall statistics ===
Pos	Team	Total	High	Low	Average	Change
1	Satun United	14,899	2,500	400	1,146	n/a
2	Pattani	12,596	2,258	500	899	n/a
3	Phuket	11,034	1,435	450	788	n/a
4	Yala United	7,165	1,800	150	716	n/a
5	Sungaipadee	5,386	1,100	300	598	n/a
6	Chumphon	6,560	1,000	150	504	n/a
7	Phattalung	5,955	1,034	135	458	n/a
8	Hatyai	3,566	750	128	396	n/a
9	Surat Thani City	2,995	745	189	332	n/a
	League total	70,156	2,500	128	674	n/a

Updated to games played on 9 September 2017
Source: Thai League 4

=== Attendance by home match played ===
Team \ Match played	1	2	3	4	5	6	7	8	9	10	11	12	13	14	15	Total
Chumphon	1,000	640	520	500	600	350	350	750	500	350	450	400	150			6,560
Hatyai	400	188	400	750	250	550	500	128	Unk.3	400						3,566
Pattani	2,258	1,200	500	765	718	650	668	643	1,267	894	900	603	543	987		12,596
Phattalung	1,034	750	600	392	737	639	308	223	500	200	157	280	135			5,955
Phuket	1,200	1,435	1,050	790	760	850	550	650	590	480	650	490	1,089	Unk.4	450	11,034
Satun United	1,165	1,500	1,500	953	1,000	700	1,281	1,500	1,100	700	Unk.2	400	600	2,500		14,899
Sungaipadee	1,100	642	900	450	494	600	400	300	500							5,386
Surat Thani City	320	189	396	320	200	353	745	222	250							2,995
Yala United	1,500	1,800	495	470	800	Unk.1	1,000	450	350	150	150					7,165

Source: Thai League 4
Note:
Unk.1 Some error of T4 official match report 6 May 2017 (Yala United 1–0 Phuket).
Unk.2 Some error of T4 official match report 6 August 2017 (Satun United 3–0 Phattalung).
Unk.3 Some error of T4 official match report 16 August 2017 (Hatyai 2–1 Sungaipadee).
Unk.4 Some error of T4 official match report 27 August 2017 (Phuket 1–1 Hatyai).

== See also ==
- 2017 Thai League
- 2017 Thai League 2
- 2017 Thai League 3
- 2017 Thai League 4
- 2017 Thailand Amateur League
- 2017 Thai FA Cup
- 2017 Thai League Cup
- 2017 Thailand Champions Cup
