= 2012 Regional League Division 2 Southern Region =

Regional League South Division
- Season: 2012

2012 Regional League Division 2 Southern Region is the 3rd season of the League competition since its establishment in 2009. It is in the third tier of the Thai football league system.

== Changes from last season ==
=== Team changes ===
==== Promoted club ====
Krabi and Phattalung were promoted to the 2012 Thai Division 1 League.

== Teams ==
=== Stadia and locations ===
Locations of the Regional League South Teams

Team	Location	Stadium	Capacity	Ref.
Chumphon	Chumphon	Chumphon Province Stadium	3,000	
Hat Yai	Songkhla	Jiranakorn Stadium	25,000	
Nakhon Si Thammarat	Nakhon Si Thammarat	Nakhon Si Thammarat Province Stadium	4,744	
Nara United	Narathiwat	Narathiwat Municipal Stadium	8,000	
Pattani	Pattani	Rainbow Stadium	8,000	
Phang Nga	Phang Nga	Phang Nga Province Stadium	3,000	
Ranong	Ranong	Ranong Province Stadium	7,212	
Satun United	Satun	Satun Province Stadium	?	
Surat	Surat Thani	Surat Thani Province Stadium	10,000	
Trang	Trang	Trang City municipality Stadium	4,789	
Yala	Yala	Institute of Physical Education Yala Campus Stadium	?	

== League table ==
Pos	Team	Pld	W	D	L	GF	GA	GD	Pts	Qualification
1	Trang (C, Q)	20	13	6	1	40	13	+27	45	Champions League Round
2	Pattani (Q)	20	9	9	2	26	16	+10	36	Champions League Round Qualifying play-off
3	Nara United	20	9	7	4	22	14	+8	34	
4	Phang Nga	20	6	9	5	15	13	+2	27	
5	Satun	20	6	9	5	27	26	+1	27	
6	Chumphon	20	7	6	7	27	27	0	27	
7	Nakhon Si Thammarat	20	5	11	4	18	20	−2	26	
8	Hat Yai	20	6	3	11	15	21	−6	21	
9	Ranong	20	5	4	11	13	26	−13	19	
10	Surat Thani	20	2	8	10	15	30	−15	14	
11	Yala	20	1	10	9	18	30	−12	13	

Rules for classification: 1) points; 2) head-to-head points; 3) head-to-head goal difference; 4) head-to-head goals scored; 5) goal difference; 6) number of goals scored.
(C) Champions; (Q) Qualified for the phase indicated
