= 2015 Regional League Division 2 Southern Region =

Regional League South Region
- Season: 2015
- Champions: Satun
- Matches: 90
- Goals: 175 (1.94 per match)
- Biggest home win: Satun 5–0 Surat Thani (5 April 2015)
- Highest scoring: Satun 5–0 Surat Thani (5 April 2015)
- Longest winning run: 3 games Yala United
- Longest unbeaten run: 7 games Nara United
- Longest losing run: 4 games Surat Thani

2015 Regional League Division 2 Southern Region is the 7th season of the League competition since its establishment in 2009. It is in the third tier of the Thai football league system.

== Changes from last season ==
=== Team changes ===
==== Promoted clubs ====
Prachuap Khiri Khan were promoted to the 2015 Thai Division 1 League.

==== Renamed clubs ====
- Ranong renamed Ranong United.
- Yala renamed Yala United.

==== Withdrawn clubs ====
Hat Yai have withdrawn from the 2015 campaign.

=== Clubs serving bans ===
- Phattalung – 2015 campaign.

== Teams ==
=== Stadium and locations ===
Locations of the 2015 Regional League South Teams

Team	Location	Stadium	Capacity	Ref.
Chumphon	Chumphon	Chumphon Province Stadium	3,000	
Nakhon Si Heritage	Nakhon Si Thammarat	Walailak University Stadium	?	
Nara United	Narathiwat	Narathiwat Provincial Administrative Organization Stadium	8,000	
Pattani	Pattani	Rainbow Stadium	8,000	
Phang Nga	Phang Nga	Phang Nga Province Stadium	3,000	
Ranong United	Ranong	Ranong Province Stadium	7,212	
Satun United	Satun	Satun Provincial Administrative Organization Stadium	4,671	
Surat	Surat Thani	Surat Thani Province Stadium	10,175	
Trang	Trang	Trang City municipality Stadium	4,789	
Yala United	Yala	Jaru Stadium	2,960	

== League table ==
Pos	Team	Pld	W	D	L	GF	GA	GD	Pts	Qualification
1	Satun United (C, Q)	18	9	7	2	32	15	+17	34	Champions League Round
2	Pattani (Q)	18	10	4	4	25	12	+13	34	Champions League Round Qualifying play-off
3	Yala United	18	10	4	4	21	14	+7	34	
4	Trang	18	7	4	7	21	17	+4	25	
5	Ranong United	18	6	6	6	18	19	−1	24	
6	Nara United	18	4	10	4	20	19	+1	22	
7	Chumphon	18	4	8	6	16	18	−2	20	
8	Surat Thani	18	5	4	9	13	26	−13	19	
9	Nakhon Si Heritage	18	2	10	6	15	26	−11	16	
10	Phang Nga	18	3	3	12	11	26	−15	12	

Rules for classification: 1) points; 2) head-to-head points; 3) head-to-head goal difference; 4) head-to-head goals scored; 5) goal difference; 6) number of goals scored.
(C) Champions; (Q) Qualified for the phase indicated
