= 2009 Regional League Division 2 Southern Region =

Regional League Division 2 Southern Region
- Season: 2009
- Champions: Narathiwat
- Biggest home win: Narathiwat 7-0 Phattalung
- Biggest away win: Krabi 0-4 Pattani
- Highest scoring: Nakhon Si Thammarat 6-2 Pattani (8)

2009 Regional League Division 2 Southern Region (Thai: ลีกภูมิภาค ภาคใต้ or ไทยลีกดิวิชัน 2 ภาคใต้) is the 3rd Level League in Thailand. The first season was played in 2009, starting in March and finishing in August.

The league winners Narathiwat entered the Regional League Championships 2009.

== Member clubs ==
=== Stadia and locations ===
Locations of the 2009 Regional League South Teams

Club	Province	Home stadium	Capacity
Krabi	Krabi	Krabi Province Stadium	?
Nakhon Si Thammarat	Nakhon Si Thammarat	Ron Phibun District Stadium	?
Narathiwat	Narathiwat	Narathiwat Province Stadium	5,561
Pattani	Pattani	Pattani Municipality Stadium	?
Phattalung	Phattalung	Phattalung Province Stadium	4,021
Phuket	Phuket	Surakul Stadium	15,000
Satun	Satun	Satun Province Stadium	4,671
Yala	Yala	Yala Province Stadium	?

== League table ==
Pos	Team	Pld	W	D	L	GF	GA	GD	Pts	Qualification
1	Narathiwat (C)	14	10	4	0	37	10	+27	34 (Note: Head to Head: Draw 3-3)	Regional League Championships entrant
2	Satun	14	10	4	0	37	14	+23	34	
3	Nakhon Si Thammarat	14	6	4	4	28	24	+4	22	
4	Pattani	14	6	2	6	24	25	−1	20	
5	Krabi	14	5	3	6	17	21	−4	18	
6	Yala	14	3	1	10	7	24	−17	10	
7	Phattalung	14	2	3	9	10	30	−20	9 (Note: Phattalung win 1-0)	
8	Phuket	14	2	3	9	11	23	−12	9	

Rules for classification: 1st points; 2nd head-to-head; 3rd goal difference; 4th goals scored
(C) Champions

== Results ==
Home \ Away	KRA	NAK	NAR	PAT	PHL	PHU	SAT	YAL
Krabi		2–2	0–2	0–4	4–2	0–1	1–1	4–0
Nakhon Si Thammarat	1–0		3–3	6–2	2–1	1–2	2–2	2–0
Narathiwat	4–0	4–0		4–0	7–0	2–0	2–2	1–0
Pattani	0–1	1–0	2–2		4–1	1–1	1–2	3–1
Phattalung	0–1	1–1	1–2	0–3		0–0	0–2	2–1
Phuket	0–0	3–4	1–2	1–2	0–1		1–4	0–1
Satun	4–2	3–1	1–1	5–1	3–1	3–0		2–1
Yala	0–2	0–3	0–1	1–0	0–0	2–1	0–3	

Source: Football Association of Thailand website
Legend: Blue = home team win; Yellow = draw; Red = away team win.

== See also ==
- 2009 Regional League Division 2 North Eastern Region
- 2009 Regional League Division 2 Northern Region
- 2009 Regional League Division 2 Central & Eastern Region
- 2009 Regional League Division 2 Bangkok Metropolitan Region
