= 2013 Regional League Division 2 Southern Region =

Regional League South Region
- Season: 2013

2013 Regional League Division 2 Southern Region is the 5th season of the League competition since its establishment in 2009. It is in the third tier of the Thai football league system.

== Changes from last season ==
=== Team changes ===
==== Promoted clubs ====
No club was promoted to the Thai Division 1 League. Last years league champions Trang and runners up Pattani failed to qualify from the 2012 Regional League Division 2 championship pool.

==== Relegated clubs ====
Phattalung, Songkhla were relegated from the 2012 Thai Division 1 League.

==== Withdrawn clubs ====
Hat Yai, Songkhla have withdrawn from the 2013 campaign.

== Teams ==
=== Stadia and locations ===
Locations of the Regional League South Teams 2013

Team	Location	Stadium	Capacity	Ref.
Chumphon	Chumphon	Chumphon Province Stadium	3,000	
Nakhon Si Heritage	Nakhon Si Thammarat	Nakhon Si Thammarat PAO. Stadium	?	
Nara United	Narathiwat	Narathiwat Municipal Stadium	?	
Pattani	Pattani	Rainbow Stadium	8,000	
Phang Nga	Phang Nga	Phang Nga Province Stadium	3,000	
Phattalung	Phattalung	Phattalung Province Stadium	5,000	
Ranong	Ranong	Ranong Province Stadium	7,212	
Satun United	Satun	Ratchakit Prakan Stadium	?	
Surat	Surat Thani	Surat Thani Province Stadium	10,175	
Trang	Trang	Trang City municipality Stadium	4,789	
Yala	Yala	Institute of Physical Education Yala Campus Stadium	2,960	

== League table ==
Pos	Team	Pld	W	D	L	GF	GA	GD	Pts	Qualification
1	Nara United (C, Q)	20	11	8	1	32	7	+25	41	Champions League Round
2	Chumphon (Q)	20	8	10	2	22	10	+12	34	Champions League Round Qualifying play-off
3	Phattalung	20	8	9	3	31	19	+12	33	
4	Phang Nga	20	8	7	5	20	14	+6	31	
5	Yala	20	7	7	6	18	24	−6	28	
6	Surat	20	5	10	5	20	21	−1	25	
7	Satun	20	7	4	9	17	26	−9	25	
8	Trang	20	3	12	5	14	18	−4	21	
9	Nakhon Si Heritage	20	4	7	9	24	36	−12	19	
10	Pattani	20	4	5	11	18	25	−7	17	
11	Ranong	20	3	5	12	14	30	−16	14	

Rules for classification: 1) points; 2) head-to-head points; 3) head-to-head goal difference; 4) head-to-head goals scored; 5) goal difference; 6) number of goals scored.
(C) Champions; (Q) Qualified for the phase indicated
