= Phang Nga F.C. =

Thai football club

Phangnga FC พังงา เอฟซี
- Full name: Phangnga Football Club สโมสรฟุตบอลจังหวัดพังงา
- Nicknames: The Dredgers (เรือขุดมหากาฬ) (เรือขุดประจัญบาน)
- Founded: 2009; 17 years ago
- Ground: Phang Nga Province Stadium; Phang Nga, Thailand
- Capacity: 3,000
- Chairman: Ruachai Kittipromwong
- Manager: Thongchai tongchoem
- Coach: Niwat Nuisa-nga
- League: Regional League Division 2
| Home colours | Away colours |

Phang Nga Football Club (Thai สโมสรฟุตบอลจังหวัดพังงา ) is a Thai semi professional football club based in Phang Nga Province.

== Stadium and locations ==
| Coordinates | Location | Stadium | Capacity | Year |
|---|---|---|---|---|
| 8°26′59″N 98°32′08″E | Phang Nga | Phang Nga Provincial Administrative Organization Stadium (Phang Nga Province Stadium) | ? | 2010–2016 |

== Season by season record ==
| Season | League | | | | | | | | | FA Cup | League Cup | Top goalscorer | |
| Season | Division | P | W | D | L | F | A | Pts | Pos | FA Cup | League Cup | Name | Goals |
|---|---|---|---|---|---|---|---|---|---|---|---|---|---|
| 2010 | South | 24 | 8 | 6 | 10 | 23 | 26 | 30 | 8th | | | | |
| 2011 | South | 24 | 9 | 8 | 7 | 32 | 30 | 35 | 5th | | | | |
| 2012 | South | 20 | 6 | 9 | 5 | 15 | 13 | 27 | 4th | | | | |
| 2013 | South | 20 | 8 | 7 | 5 | 20 | 14 | 31 | 4th | | | | |
| 2014 | South | 24 | 5 | 9 | 10 | 26 | 40 | 24 | 10th | | | | |
| 2015 | South | 18 | 3 | 3 | 12 | 11 | 26 | 12 | 10th | Not Enter | R1 | | |
| 2016 | South | 22 | 5 | 6 | 11 | 23 | 35 | 21 | 11th | Not Enter | 1st Qualification | | |
| 2017 | T4 South | Suspended | | | | | | | | | | | |
