= Yala United F.C. =

Thai football club

Yala United ยะลา ยูไนเต็ด
- Full name: Yala United Football Club สโมสรฟุตบอลยะลา ยูไนเต็ด
- Nicknames: Dream Team Kris Selatan (กริชพิฆาต)
- Founded: 2009; 17 years ago, as Yala FC; 2015; 11 years ago, as Yala United
- Ground: Jaru Stadium; Yala, Thailand
- Capacity: 2,500
- Chairman: Sukano Mata
- Manager: Chayapol Khachasan
- League: Thai League 4
Home colours	Away colours

Yala United Football Club (Thai สโมสรฟุตบอลยะลา ยูไนเต็ด) is a Thai semi professional football club based in Yala Province. They currently play in the Thai League 4 of the Southern Region. This football Club changed its name to Yala United in the year 2015.

In 2018, the Club-licensing football club of this team didn't pass to play the 2018 Thai League 4 Southern Region. This team was banned for 2 years and was relegated to the 2020 Thailand Amateur League Southern Region.

== Stadium and locations ==
Coordinates	Location	Stadium	Capacity	Year
6°33′09″N 101°17′30″E	Yala	Yala Province Stadium (Institute of Physical Education, Yala Campus Stadium)	2,960	2009–2014
6°34′41″N 101°17′50″E	Yala	Jaru Stadium (Yala City Municipality Stadium)	2,960	2015–2017

== Season By Season record ==
Season	League									FA Cup	League Cup	Top goalscorer	
Season	Division	P	W	D	L	F	A	Pts	Pos	FA Cup	League Cup	Name	Goals
2009	South	14	3	1	10	7	24	10	6th	Not Entered.	Not Entered.		
2010	South	24	7	7	10	20	22	28	9th	Not Entered.			
2011	South	24	5	3	16	18	52	18	12th	Not Entered.			
2012	South	24	1	10	9	18	30	13	11th	Not Entered.			
2013	South	20	7	7	6	18	24	28	5th	QR2			
2014	South	23	5	9	9	17	20	24	9th				
2015	South	18	10	4	4	21	14	34	3rd	Not Entered.	QR2		
2016	South	22	10	4	8	34	31	34	6th	Not Entered.	R1		
2017	T4 South	24	8	4	12	32	35	28	7th	R1	Qualification play-off	Pithak Abdulraman	9
2018	T4 South												

Champions	Runners-up	Promoted	Relegated

== Player squad ==
Note: Flags indicate national team as defined under FIFA eligibility rules; some limited exceptions apply. Players may hold more than one non-FIFA nationality.

No.	Pos.	Nation	Player
1	GK	THA	Asae Masae
2	DF	THA	Furakorn Ta-le
3	DF	THA	Noppasak Noonsri
4	DF	THA	Maitree Waewsawang
5	DF	THA	Abdulpata Masae
6	DF	THA	Nu-aman Bu-ngor
7	MF	THA	Muhammadro-sae Jema
8	MF	THA	Madsanusee Salilo
9	FW	THA	Mahamanayupee Awae
10	FW	THA	Muhammaddanyal Wanglim
11	MF	THA	Muhammadmandee Mange
12	MF	THA	Wan-usman Gaamyhi
13	DF	THA	Suhaimee Raman (captain)
14	FW	THA	Koyree Layeng
16	DF	THA	Maleegree Deulamae
17	MF	THA	Ameen Yuuso

No.	Pos.	Nation	Player
18	GK	THA	Lookman Ilala
19	MF	THA	Abus Hayeesamae
20	DF	THA	Maposee Aliputu
21	FW	CMR	Ebai Emmanuel
22	GK	THA	Nuradin Asaba-ngoy
23	MF	THA	Tanwa Payayam
24	FW	THA	Muhammad Usenglanong
25	DF	THA	Musron Sama
26	FW	THA	Muhammadfaisal Asae
27	DF	THA	Den Jelong
28	DF	THA	Gareeya Salae
29	DF	THA	Ni-anwar Waedo
30	MF	THA	Muhammadsalfadee Jehteh
32	MF	THA	Manso Ausman
34	MF	EGY	Ahmed Mamdouh
