= 2009 Regional League Division 2 Northern Region =

Regional League Northern Division
- Season: 2009
- Champions: Chiangrai United; 1st Title
- Matches: 110
- Goals: 392 (3.56 per match)
- Biggest home win: Sukhothai 11-1 Tak
- Biggest away win: Tak 2-10 Chainat
- Highest scoring: Tak 2-10 Chainat; Sukhothai 11-1 Tak (12 goals)

2009 Regional League Division 2 Northern Region (Thai: ลีกภูมิภาค ภาคเหนือ or ไทยลีกดิวิชัน 2 ภาคเหนือ) is the 3rd Level League in Thailand. In 2009, contains 11 clubs from Northern region.

== Stadium and locations ==
Locations of the 2009 Regional League North Teams

Club	Province	Home stadium	Capacity
Chainat	Chainat	Chai Nat Provincial Stadium	3,374
Chiangmai United	Chiangmai	700th Anniversary Stadium	25,000
Chiangrai United	Chiang Rai	Mae Fah Luang University Stadium	3,346
Kamphaeng Phet	Kamphaeng Phet	Kamphaeng Phet Province Stadium	?
Phetchabun	Phetchabun	Institute of Physical Education Phetchabun Stadium	?
Phichit	Phichit	Khao Sai Municipality Stadium	?
Phitsanulok	Phitsanulok	Phitsanulok Province Stadium	?
Phrae	Phrae	Phrae Province Stadium	?
Sukhothai	Sukhothai	Institute of Physical Education Sukhothai Stadium	4,500
Tak	Tak	Tak Province Stadium	3,171
Uttaradit	Uttaradit	Uttaradit Province Stadium	?

== Final league table ==
Pos	Team	Pld	W	D	L	GF	GA	GD	Pts	Qualification
1	Chiangrai United (C)	20	17	3	0	62	16	+46	54	Qualified for Championship League round
2	Phichit	20	13	3	4	55	28	+27	42	
3	Chainat	20	12	3	5	52	32	+20	39	
4	Uttaradit	20	10	3	7	36	35	+1	33	
5	Phetchabun	20	9	3	8	32	28	+4	30	
6	Phitsanulok	20	6	7	7	32	33	−1	25	
7	Sukhothai	20	6	6	8	29	29	0	24	
8	Kamphaeng Phet	20	4	9	7	24	31	−7	21	
9	Chiangmai United	20	4	4	12	24	44	−20	16 (Note: Head to Head: Chiangmai United win 2-1)	
10	Phrae	20	3	7	10	20	40	−20	16	
11	Tak	20	1	2	17	26	76	−50	5	

Rules for classification: 1st points; 2nd head-to-head; 3rd goal difference; 4th goals scored
(C) Champions

== Results ==
Home \ Away	CHN	CHM	CHR	KPP	PCB	PCT	PSL	PHR	SKT	TAK	UTD
Chainat		3–1	2–5	1–0	2–0	3–5	5–2	0–0	1–0	3–1	4–1
Chiangmai United	1–4		0–3	2–2	2–0	1–3	1–2	1–1	0–1	4–2	3–4
Chiangrai United	2–2	2–0		1–0	3–2	4–1	2–0	3–1	1–1	7–0	3–0
Kamphaeng Phet	1–3	2–0	1–1		1–1	0–0	1–3	2–2	1–1	2–2	2–2
Phetchabun	2–3	3–0	1–3	5–0		4–2	3–1	1–1	2–1	2–1	2–0
Phichit	1–0	7–1	2–3	2–1	2–0		1–1	7–2	3–0	2–2	1–2
Phitsanulok	0–1	0–0	0–3	2–2	2–0	3–3		1–1	2–2	5–1	2–3
Phrae	0–0	0–1	0–6	2–1	0–2	1–4	0–2		1–2	3–2	1–1
Sukhothai	4–2	2–1	0–2	0–1	0–0	1–3	0–0	0–3		11–1	0–0
Tak	2–10	2–2	1–4	1–2	1–2	1–4	2–3	2–1	2–3		2–5
Uttaradit	4–3	1–3	2–4	0–2	3–0	0–2	2–1	2–0	3–0	1–0	

Source: Football Association of Thailand website
Legend: Blue = home team win; Yellow = draw; Red = away team win.

== See also ==
- 2009 Regional League Division 2 North Eastern Region
- 2009 Regional League Division 2 Central & Eastern Region
- 2009 Regional League Division 2 Bangkok Metropolitan Region
- 2009 Regional League Division 2 Southern Region
