= 2009 Regional League Division 2 Central & Eastern Region =

Regional League Division 2 Central & Eastern Region
- Season: 2009
- Champions: Samut Prakan
- Biggest home win: Ayutthaya 5-0 Nakhon Nayok; Saraburi 5-0 Nakhon Nayok; Samut Prakan 6-1 Nakhon Nayok
- Biggest away win: Rose Asia Pathum Thani 2-5 Thai Summit
- Highest scoring: Cha Choeng Sao 4-4 Singburi (8)

2009 Regional League Division 2 Central & Eastern Region (Thai: ลีกภูมิภาค ภาคกลางและภาคตะวันออก or ไทยลีกดิวิชัน 2 ภาคกลางและภาคตะวันออก) is the 3rd Level League in Thailand. In 2009, it contained 12 clubs from Central & Eastern region.

== Stadium and locations ==
Locations of the 2009 Regional League Division 2 Central & Eastern Region Teams
Football clubs in Bangkok Metropolitan Region

Club	Province	Home stadium	Capacity
Ayutthaya	Ayutthaya	Ayutthaya Province Stadium	6,000
Cha Choeng Sao	Cha Choeng Sao	Chachoengsao Province Stadium	3,778
Lopburi	Lopburi	Lopburi Province Stadium	5,334
Nakhon Nayok	Nakhon Nayok	Nakhon Nayok Province Stadium	?
Prachuap Khiri Khan	Prachuap Khiri Khan	Prachuap Khiri Khan Province Stadium	?
Ratchaburi	Ratchaburi	Ratchaburi Province Stadium	10,373
Rayong	Rayong	Rayong Province Stadium	4,512
Rose Asia Pathum Thani	Pathum Thani	Chaloem Phra Kiat Stadium (Khlong 6)	?
Samut Prakan	Samut Prakan Thung Khru, Bangkok	Huachiew Chalermprakiet University Stadium 72-years Anniversary Stadium (Bang Mod)	? 8,000
Saraburi	Saraburi	Ban Mo District Stadium	?
Singburi	Singburi	Singburi Province Stadium	3,449
Thai Summit	Samut Prakan	Samut Prakarn SAT Stadium (Keha Bang Phli)	?

== Final league table ==
Pos	Team	Pld	W	D	L	GF	GA	GD	Pts	Qualification
1	Samut Prakan	22	13	7	2	41	20	+21	46	Champions & Regional League Championships entrant
2	Ayutthaya	22	12	8	2	40	21	+19	44	
3	Saraburi	22	11	8	3	43	27	+16	41	
4	Thai Summit	22	10	5	7	40	30	+10	35	
5	Lopburi	22	9	6	7	31	25	+6	33	
6	Singburi	22	9	5	8	29	33	−4	32	
7	Cha Choeng Sao	22	8	7	7	32	31	+1	31	
8	Rayong	22	5	9	8	18	20	−2	24	
9	Ratchaburi	22	4	9	9	31	33	−2	21	
10	Prachuap Khiri Khan	22	2	14	6	23	32	−9	20	
11	Nakhon Nayok	22	2	9	11	14	41	−27	15	
12	Rose Asia Pathum Thani	22	1	5	16	17	46	−29	8	

Rules for classification: 1st points; 2nd head-to-head; 3rd goal difference; 4th goals scored.

== Results ==
Home \ Away	ATY	CCS	LPB	NNY	PKK	RTB	RYN	RPT	SPR	SRB	SGB	TSM
Ayutthaya		2–1	2–1	5–0	1–1	4–1	2–0	2–1	2–1	0–0	1–3	3–2
Cha Choeng Sao	2–2		2–1	1–1	1–0	0–0	2–1	1–0	1–1	5–1	4–4	2–2
Lopburi	1–2	0–1		2–0	2–1	1–1	1–1	1–0	0–2	2–2	2–0	4–0
Nakhon Nayok	2–0	0–0	1–3		1–1	2–0	0–2	0–0	1–1	0–3	1–1	0–1
Prachuap Khiri Khan	1–1	3–2	0–0	1–1		1–1	0–0	2–2	1–2	1–1	0–0	1–1
Ratchaburi	0–2	3–1	3–1	0–0	1–2		0–0	5–2	2–2	1–2	1–2	1–3
Rayong	1–1	0–1	1–1	3–0	2–2	1–1		1–0	0–1	1–1	2–0	0–1
Rose Asia Pathum Thani	0–3	1–2	1–2	1–1	2–2	0–5	1–0		0–1	1–3	1–2	2–5
Samut Prakan	2–2	2–1	0–2	6–1	1–1	1–0	3–1	3–0		1–1	2–0	3–2
Saraburi	0–2	2–0	3–1	5–0	3–1	2–2	2–0	1–1	2–2		2–0	2–1
Singburi	1–1	3–1	0–1	3–2	2–0	2–1	0–0	2–1	0–2	2–4		1–0
Thai Summit	0–0	2–1	2–2	2–0	5–1	2–2	0–1	2–0	0–2	3–1	4–1	

Updated to match(es) played on unknown. Source: Football Association of Thailand website
Legend: Blue = home team win; Yellow = draw; Red = away team win.

== See also ==
- 2009 Regional League Division 2 North Eastern Region
- 2009 Regional League Division 2 Northern Region
- 2009 Regional League Division 2 Bangkok Metropolitan Region
- 2009 Regional League Division 2 Southern Region
