= 2010 Regional League Division 2 =

- Season: 2010
- Champions: Buriram F.C.
- Promoted: Buriram F.C.; F.C. Phuket; Chiangmai F.C.; Chainat F.C.

The 2010 Regional League Division 2 (also known as the AIS Regional League Division 2 for sponsorship reasons) was contested by the five regional league winners and runners up of the 3rd level championships of Thailand. The two best 3rd placed teams from the regional leagues also take part

Twelve teams were split into two groups of A & B, with the top two teams from group A & B gaining promotion to the Thai 1st Division for the 2011 campaign, along with this, the two group winners would play off to determine the overall champions.

The teams finishing in 3rd and 4th position would enter another round of playoffs with the bottom four sides of the Thai Division 1 League to determine if they would play in the 1st Division for the 2011 campaign.

== 2010 Regional League table All locations ==
Locations of the Regional League Division 2 All Teams in 2010
2010 Regional League Division 2 Bangkok & field Region
2010 Regional League Division 2 Central & Eastern Region
2010 Regional League Division 2 Northern Region
2010 Regional League Division 2 North Eastern Region
2010 Regional League Division 2 Southern Region

=== 2010 ===
red Zone:2010 Regional League Division 2 Bangkok Metropolitan Region
Yellow Zone:2010 Regional League Division 2 Central & Eastern Region
Green Zone: 2010 Regional League Division 2 Northern Region Region
Orange Zone:2010 Regional League Division 2 North Eastern Region
Blue Zone:2010 Regional League Division 2 Southern Region

=== List of qualified teams ===
Last Update October 1, 2011

Bangkok & field (2)

- Bangkok (Winner)
- J.W. Rangsit (Runner-up)

Central & Eastern (2)

- Saraburi (Winner)
- Samut Prakan (Runner-up)
- Rayong (Highest 3rd point)

Northern (3)

- Chiangmai (Winner)
- Chainat (Runner-up)
- Phichit (Highest 3rd point)

North Eastern (2)

- Loei City (Winner)
- Buriram (Runner-up)

Southern (2)

- Phuket (Winner)
- Trang (Runner-up)
Football clubs in Bangkok Metropolitan Region

== League table ==
=== Group A ===
Last updated December 25, 2010

Pos	Team	Pld	W	D	L	GF	GA	GD	Pts	Promotion or qualification
1	Buriram	10	7	2	1	19	7	+12	23	Promotion spot for the Thai Division 1 League
2	Chiangmai	10	7	1	2	17	9	+8	22	Promotion spot for the Thai Division 1 League
3	Saraburi	10	6	3	1	15	8	+7	21	Thai Division 1 League promotion/relegation playoffs
4	Rangsit University	10	3	0	7	9	16	−7	9	Thai Division 1 League promotion/relegation playoffs
5	Phichit	10	2	2	6	11	18	−7	8	
6	Trang	10	1	0	9	7	20	−13	3	

=== Group B ===
Pos	Team	Pld	W	D	L	GF	GA	GD	Pts	Promotion or qualification
1	Phuket	10	5	4	1	12	7	+5	19	Promotion spot for the Thai Division 1 League
2	Chainat	10	5	3	2	24	14	+10	18	Promotion spot for the Thai Division 1 League
3	Rayong	10	4	5	1	15	10	+5	17	Thai Division 1 League promotion/relegation playoffs
4	Bangkok	10	2	4	4	12	15	−3	10	Thai Division 1 League promotion/relegation playoffs
5	Samut Prakan	10	2	4	4	12	16	−4	10	
6	Loei City	10	1	2	7	8	21	−13	5	

Rules for classification: 1st points; 2nd head-to-head; 3rd goal difference; 4th goals scored

== 3/4 Place Playoff ==
29 December 2010
16.00 UTC+7

Chiangmai	3 – 3 9-8 p	Chainat
Panuwat A. 44', 66'; Wasuwat 84'		Sadayu 41'; Thanongsak P. 74'; Kim B.C. 90+4'

Suphachalasai Stadium, Bangkok
Referee: Prathan Nasawang

== Final ==
29 December 2010
18.00 UTC+7

Buriram	1 – 0	Phuket
Supakit 41'

Suphachalasai Stadium, Bangkok
Referee: Prapoj Dissomsri

== Champions ==
The 2010 Regional League Division 2 winners were Buriram

== See also ==
- 2010 Thai Premier League
- 2010 Thai Division 1 League
- 2010 Thai FA Cup
- 2010 Kor Royal Cup
