= Dimitri Carlos Zozimar =

Malagasy footballer

Carlos
Personal information
- Full name: Dimitri Carlos Zozimar
- Date of birth: February 16, 1988 (age 38)
- Place of birth: Antananarivo, Madagascar
- Height: 1.77 m (5 ft 9 1/2 in)
- Position: Midfielder

Team information
- Current team: Batu Dua
- Number: 9

Senior career*
Years	Team	Apps	(Gls)
2007	AA Antsirable		
2008–2009	BEC Tero Sasana		
2009–2010	SO Romorantin	17	(1)
2011–2013	Suphanburi		
2013–2016	Rajpracha		(8)
2017	Muang Loei United	33	(6)
2018	Pattani	21	(10)
2019	Kelantan United	7	(3)
2019–	Batu Dua	4	(1)

International career
2007–2013	Madagascar	12	(0)
- * Club domestic league appearances and goals as of 28 July 2019

Dimitri Carlos Zozimar (born February 16, 1988), or simply Carlos, is a Malagasy footballer who plays in the Malaysia M3 League with Batu Dua. Previously, he played in the Championnat de France amateur for SO Romorantin, with his national teammate Claudio Ramiadamanana.

He has also previously played for AA Antsirabe.
