= Kirati Kaewnongdang =

Thai footballer (born 1997)

Personal information
- Full name: Kirati Kaewnongdang
- Date of birth: 16 April 1997 (age 29)
- Place of birth: Loei, Thailand
- Position: Left midfielder

Team information
- Current team: Pattani
- Number: 40

Youth career
- –2017: Navy

Senior career*
| Years | Team | Apps | (Gls) |
| 2018–2019 | Navy | | |
| 2018 | → Rayong (loan) | 27 | (2) |
| 2019–2023 | Rayong | 97 | (10) |
| 2023–2025 | Sukhothai | 22 | (0) |
| 2025 | Phrae United | 3 | (0) |
| 2026– | Pattani | 0 | (0) |
- * Club domestic league appearances and goals as of 12 January 2026

Kirati Kaewnongdang (Thai: กีรติ แก้วหนองแดง; born April 16, 1997) is a Thai professional footballer who plays as a left midfielder for Thai League 2 club Pattani.
