= Sungaipadee F.C. =

Thai football club

Chachoengsao City ฉะเชิงเทรา ซิตี้
- Full name: Chachoengsao City Football Club สโมสรฟุตบอล ฉะเชิงเทรา ซิตี้
- Nickname(s): Budo Tigers (พยัคฆ์ร้ายบูโดพลัดถิ่น)
- Founded: 2016; 9 years ago as Sungaipadee F.C. (สโมสรฟุตบอล สุไหงปาดี) 2019; 6 years ago as Narathiwat F.C. (สโมสรฟุตบอล นราธิวาส) 2021; 4 years ago as Chachoengsao City F.C. (สโมสรฟุตบอล ฉะเชิงเทรา ซิตี้)
- Ground: Bueng Sing Stadium Khlong 18; Bang Nam Priao; Chachoengsao, Thailand
- Capacity: -
- Chairman: Apichart Un-ab
- Manager: Nimit Liewtrakul
- Coach: Papon Punyaraksit
- League: Thailand Amateur League East Region
Home colours	Away colours

Chachoengsao City Football Club (Thai สโมสรฟุตบอล ฉะเชิงเทรา ซิตี้), is a Thai football club based in Bang Nam Priao, Chachoengsao, Thailand. The club participates in Thailand Amateur League East Region.

== History ==
The club was formed in 2016 at Paluru, Su-ngai Padi, Narathiwat Province. Musrudin Hami Sub-District Headman of Paluru was the club first chairman. They joined the Thai Football Division 3 (Southern Region) In 2016 season.

On 23 December 2016, they played their first official match at Wiang Sa sub-disdrict municipality stadium, Surat Thani Province and draw against Newball Satun F.C. 0–0. They were southern region runner-up in their first season.

In 2017, The Club relegated to Thailand Amateur League Southern Region because they get last position (9th) of 2017 Thai League 4 Southern Region.

In 2021, The club move to Bang Nam Priao District, Chachoengsao Province and renamed to Chachoengsao City F.C.

== Current Player ==
Note: Flags indicate national team as defined under FIFA eligibility rules; some limited exceptions apply. Players may hold more than one non-FIFA nationality.

No.	Pos.	Nation	Player
1	GK	(Thailand) THA	Muhammad Yumree Hayeehama
2	DF	(Thailand) THA	Sabri Horya
3	DF	(Thailand) THA	Anas Porheng
4	DF	(Thailand) THA	Iriah Porji
5	FW	(Thailand) THA	Jirasak Porni
6	DF	(Zimbabwe) ZIM	Abdulmorid Tafaswan
7	MF	(Thailand) THA	Hafiz Niyom
8	MF	(Thailand) THA	Piyawuth Thongtha
9	FW	(Thailand) THA	Apichart Un-Abb
10	MF	(Thailand) THA	Figri Niheng
11	MF	(Thailand) THA	Tawan Yusoe
13	MF	(Thailand) THA	Ousman Lateh
15	DF	(Thailand) THA	Hafiz Saah

No.	Pos.	Nation	Player
16	MF	(Thailand) THA	Ruslan Makorseng
17	MF	(Ghana) GHA	Daniel Omaboey
18	GK	(Thailand) THA	Saiful Mayi
19	FW	(Thailand) THA	Marwan Saleh
21	MF	(Thailand) THA	Hasan Masamae
23	FW	(Thailand) THA	Hafizee Saleh
24	MF	(Thailand) THA	Santawee Seehawat
25	GK	(Thailand) THA	Nik Ansar Saleh
26	FW	(Thailand) THA	Suthep Binsaleh
32	DF	(Thailand) THA	Chayapol Jumparat
33	MF	(Thailand) THA	Abdulwahed Taleh
37	MF	(Thailand) THA	Hassan Marorsoe
77	DF	(Thailand) THA	Amad Taufiq Sai

== Stadium and locations ==
Coordinates	Location	Stadium	Capacity	Year
6°01′41″N 101°57′59″E	Su-ngai Kolok, Narathiwat	Maharaj Stadium	?	2017–present

== Record ==
Season	League									FA Cup	League Cup	Top goalscorer	
Season	Division	P	W	D	L	F	A	Pts	Pos	FA Cup	League Cup	Name	Goals
2016	DIV 3 South	3	0	3	0	1	1	3	Qualify to final round (by drawing of lots)	Not Enter	Can't Enter	Hafezee Saleh	1
2016	DIV 3 South (Final Round)	1	0	1	0	1	1	–	2nd	Not Enter	Can't Enter	Apichart Un-Abb	1
2017	T4 South	24	2	5	17	17	45	11	9th	Not Enter	Not Enter	Daniel Omaboe	8
2018	TA South									Not Enter	Can't Enter		

Champions	Runners-up	Promoted	Relegated
