= 2013 Regional League Division 2 =

- Season: 2013
- Champions: Roi Et United
- Promoted: Angthong; Chiangmai; Phitsanulok; Roi Et United

2013 Regional League Division 2 was contested by the five regional league winners and runners up of the 3rd level championships of Thailand. The one best 3rd placed teams from the regional leagues also take part

Twelve teams were split into two groups of A & B, with the top two teams from group A & B gaining promotion to the Yamaha League-1 for the 2014 campaign, along with this, the two group winners would play off to determine the overall champions.

== 2013 Regional League table All locations ==
Locations of the Regional League Division 2 All Teams in 2013
2013 Regional League Division 2 Bangkok & field Region
2013 Regional League Division 2 Central & Eastern Region
2013 Regional League Division 2 Central & Western Region
2013 Regional League Division 2 Northern Region
2013 Regional League Division 2 North Eastern Region
2013 Regional League Division 2 Southern Region

=== 2013 ===
red Zone:2013 Regional League Division 2 Bangkok Metropolitan Region
Yellow Zone:2013 Regional League Division 2 Central & Eastern Region
Pink Zone:2013 Regional League Division 2 Central & Western Region
Green Zone: 2013 Regional League Division 2 Northern Region Region
Orange Zone:2013 Regional League Division 2 North Eastern Region
Blue Zone:2013 Regional League Division 2 Southern Region

=== List of qualified teams ===
Bangkok & field (2)

- Paknampho NSRU (Winner)
- Kasetsart (Runner-up)

Central & Eastern (2)

- Look Isan-Thai Airways (Winner)
- Nakhon Nayok (Runner-up)

Central & Western (2)

- Angthong (Winner)
- Prachuap Khiri Khan (Runner-up)

Northern (3)

- Chiangmai (Winner)
- Phitsanulok (Runner-up)
- Sukhothai (3rd, Winner championship pool qualifying play-off)

North Eastern (2)

- Roi Et United (Winner)
- Udon Thani (Runner-up)

Southern (1)

- Nara United (Winner)
Football clubs in Bangkok Metropolitan Region

== Championship Pool Qualifying play-off ==
22 March 2013
18.00 UTC+7

† Sukhothai	1 – 0	Chumphon

Ayutthaya Stadium, Ayutthaya

† Winner : Sukhothai (Qualification for the championship pool ).

== Champions League Round table ==
=== Group A ===
Pos	Team	Pld	W	D	L	GF	GA	GD	Pts	Promotion
1	Roi Et United (P)	10	8	1	1	16	3	+13	25	Promotion spot for the Yamaha League-1
2	Phitsanulok (P)	10	6	1	3	12	7	+5	19	Promotion spot for the Yamaha League-1
3	Kasetsart	10	3	3	4	10	10	0	12	
4	Nara United	10	3	3	4	10	15	−5	12	
5	Look Isan-Thai Airways	10	2	3	5	2	10	−8	9	
6	Prachuap Khiri Khan	10	0	5	5	5	10	−5	5	

(P) Promoted

=== Group B ===
Pos	Team	Pld	W	D	L	GF	GA	GD	Pts	Promotion
1	Chiangmai (P)	10	6	2	2	16	9	+7	20	Promotion spot for the Yamaha League-1
2	Angthong (P)	10	5	2	3	15	12	+3	17	Promotion spot for the Yamaha League-1
3	Sukhothai	10	4	4	2	18	15	+3	16	
4	Paknampho NSRU	10	4	3	3	14	11	+3	15	
5	Udon Thani	10	3	0	7	10	16	−6	9	
6	Nakhon Nayok	10	2	1	7	10	20	−10	7	

Rules for classification: 1st points; 2nd head-to-head; 3rd goal difference; 4th goals scored
(P) Promoted

== 3/4 Place ==
First Leg

14 December 2013
18:00 UTC+7

Phitsanulok TSY	1–2	Angthong

Phitsanulok Central Stadium, Phitsanulok

Second Leg

21 December 2013
17:30 UTC+7

Angthong	0-2	Phitsanulok TSY FC

Ang Thong Stadium, Ang Thong

Phitsanulok won 3–2 on aggregate.

== Final ==
First Leg

15 December 2013
18:00 UTC+7

Roiet United	0–0	Chiang Mai

Roiet Stadium, Roiet
Referee: Anuwat Feemuechang

Second Leg

22 December 2013
18:00 UTC+7

Chiang Mai	0–2	Roiet United

700th Anniversary Stadium, Chiang Mai

Roi Et United won 2–0 on aggregate.

== Champions ==
The Regional Division 2 2013 winners were Roiet United.

== See also ==
- 2013 Thai Premier League
- 2013 Thai Division 1 League
- 2013 Thai FA Cup
- 2013 Thai League Cup
- 2013 Kor Royal Cup
