= 2009 Regional League Division 2 =

- Season: 2009
- Champions: Raj Pracha-Nonthaburi
- Promoted: Raj Pracha-Nonthaburi; Chiangrai United; Narathiwat
- Goals: 49
- Biggest home win: Narathiwat 3 - 1 Loei City
- Biggest away win: Narathiwat 0 - 2 Raj Pracha-Nonthaburi
- Highest scoring: Loei City 3 - 3 Chiangrai United (6)

2009 Regional League Division 2 was contested by the five regional league winners of the 3rd level championships of Thailand.

Five teams met on a home and away basis, with the top three teams gaining promotion to the Thai 1st Division for the 2010 campaign.

== 2009 Regional League Round table All locations ==
Locations of the Regional League Division 2 All Teams in 2009
2009 Regional League Division 2 Bangkok & field Region
2009 Regional League Division 2 Central & Eastern Region
2009 Regional League Division 2 Northern Region
2009 Regional League Division 2 North Eastern Region
2009 Regional League Division 2 Southern Region

=== 2009 ===
Red Zone:2009 Regional League Division 2 Bangkok Metropolitan Region
Yellow Zone:2009 Regional League Division 2 Central & Eastern Region
Green Zone: 2009 Regional League Division 2 Northern Region Region
Orange Zone:2009 Regional League Division 2 North Eastern Region
Blue Zone:2009 Regional League Division 2 Southern Region

=== List of qualified teams ===
Teams

Chiangrai United North Eastern Region 2009 Winners
Raj Pracha-Nonthaburi Bangkok & Field Region 2009 Winners
Narathiwat Southern Region Winners
Loei City North Eastern Region 2009 Winners
Samut Prakan Central & Eastern Region 2009 Winners

Football clubs in Bangkok Metropolitan Region

== Champions League Round table ==
Clubs of the Play-Offs 2009

Pos	Team	Pld	W	D	L	GF	GA	GD	Pts	Promotion
1	Raj Pracha-Nonthaburi	8	4	2	2	10	7	+3	14	Promotion to 2010 Division 1
2	Chiangrai United	8	3	3	2	12	11	+1	12	Promotion to 2010 Division 1
3	Nara United	8	2	4	2	9	9	0	10	Promotion to 2010 Division 1
4	Samut Prakan	8	2	3	3	6	7	−1	9	
5	Loei City	8	2	2	4	12	15	−3	8	

Rules for classification: 1) points; 2) goal difference; 3) number of goals scored.

== Results ==
Home \ Away	CHU	LOE	NAR	RPN	SPN
Chiangrai United		2–1	2–2	0–1	0–1
Loei City	3–3		2–3	2–1	1–0
Nara United	1–1	3–1		0–2	0–1
Raj Pracha-Nonthaburi	1–2	2–1	0–0		1–1
Samut Prakan	1–2	1–1	0–0	1–2	

Source: Football Association of Thailand website
Legend: Blue = home team win; Yellow = draw; Red = away team win.

== Champions ==
The 2009 Regional League Division 2 winners were Raj Pracha-Nonthaburi FC

== See also ==
- 2009 Thai Premier League
- 2009 Thai Division 1 League
- 2009 Thai FA Cup
- 2009 Kor Royal Cup
