= Phuket Andaman F.C. =

Association football club in Thailand

Phuket Andaman ภูเก็ต อันดามัน
- Full name: Phuket Andaman Football Club สโมสรฟุตบอลภูเก็ต อันดามัน
- Nicknames: The Lobsters (ล็อบสเตอร์)
- Founded: 2019; 7 years ago, as Patong City Football Club; 2022; 4 years ago, as Phuket Andaman Football Club
- Ground: Surakul Stadium; Phuket, Thailand
- Capacity: 15,000
- Owner(s): Higher Sport Co., Ltd.
- Chairman: Russ Horsley
- Head Coach: vacant
- League: Thai League 3
- 2025–26: Thai League 3, 7th of 10 in the Southern region
| Home colours | Away colours |

Phuket Andaman Football Club (Thai: สโมสรฟุตบอลภูเก็ต อันดามัน) is a Thai professional football club based in Phuket. It plays in the Thai League 3 Southern region.

== History ==
In 2009, the club was formed as Phuket Football Club, nicknamed the Southern Sea Kirins, and admitted to the Regional League South Division. Club home games were played at Surakul Stadium. Sirirak Konthong was named as the first ever coach of Phuket. In 2010, Phuket won the Southern Regional Division 2 and finished 2nd in the Division 2 Champions League after losing to Buriram FC in the final. However, the club was promoted to Division 1.

In 2017, Phuket F.C. decided to dissolve the club due to financial problems in connection with unfair contract cancellations.

In 2018, Phuket F.C. collapsed and combined with Phuket City.

In 2022, Phuket Andaman competed in the Thai League 3 for the 2022–23 season. It was their 3rd season in the professional league. The club started the season with a 1–0 home win over Muang Trang United and they ended the season with a 1–2 away defeat to Muang Trang United. The club finished in 6th place in the league of the Southern region. In addition, in the 2022–23 Thai League Cup, Phuket Andaman was defeated 0–1 by Young Singh Hatyai United in the first qualification round, causing them to be eliminated.

== Honours ==
=== Domestic leagues ===
- Regional League Division 2
  - Runners-up (1): 2010
- Regional League South Division
  - Winners (1): 2010

== Stadium and locations ==
| Coordinates | Location | Stadium | Capacity | Year |
|---|---|---|---|---|
| 7°53′20″N 98°22′19″E | Phuket | Surakul Stadium | 15,000 | 2009 – present |

== Seasons ==
| Season | League | | | | | | | | | FA Cup | League Cup | T3 Cup | Top scorer | |
| Season | Division | P | W | D | L | F | A | Pts | Pos | FA Cup | League Cup | T3 Cup | Name | Goals |
Phuket F.C.
| 2009 | DIV 2 South | 14 | 2 | 3 | 9 | 11 | 23 | 9 | 8th | R1 | | | | |
| 2010 | DIV 2 South | 24 | 17 | 4 | 3 | 51 | 18 | 55 | 1st | R3 | R1 | | (Ivory Coast) Diarra Ali | 11 |
| 2011 | DIV 1 | 34 | 11 | 12 | 11 | 45 | 47 | 45 | 9th | R3 | QF | | (Ivory Coast) Adama Koné | 12 |
| 2012 | DIV 1 | 34 | 10 | 10 | 14 | 40 | 47 | 40 | 13th | Opted out | R2 | | (Ivory Coast) Ibrahim Kanoute | 7 |
| 2013 | DIV 1 | 34 | 8 | 15 | 11 | 36 | 42 | 39 | 13th | R4 | R1 | | (Brazil) Luiz Eduardo Purchino | 7 |
| 2014 | DIV 1 | 34 | 12 | 11 | 11 | 39 | 39 | 47 | 11th | R2 | R3 | | (Thailand) Wasan Natasan | 12 |
| 2015 | DIV 1 | 38 | 12 | 7 | 19 | 38 | 65 | 43 | 18th | R3 | R1 | | (Cameroon) Berlin Ndebe-Nlome | 16 |
| 2016 | DIV 2 South | 22 | 5 | 11 | 6 | 30 | 32 | 26 | 9th | R1 | R1 | | (Thailand) Sukree Etae | 6 |
| 2017 | T4 South | 24 | 14 | 6 | 4 | 37 | 17 | 48 | 2nd | Opted out | Opted out | | (Thailand) Nattapoom Maya | 13 |
Patong City F.C.
| 2019 | TA South | 3 | 3 | 0 | 0 | 10 | 4 | 9 | 2nd | Opted out | Ineligible | | | |
| 2020–21 | T3 South | 17 | 3 | 2 | 12 | 16 | 36 | 11 | 10th | Opted out | QR1 | | (Thailand) Yodwong Misen | 10 |
| 2021–22 | T3 South | 24 | 5 | 5 | 14 | 18 | 32 | 20 | 11th | Opted out | Opted out | | (Thailand) Yodwong Misen | 10 |
Phuket Andaman F.C.
| 2022–23 | T3 South | 22 | 8 | 6 | 8 | 26 | 30 | 30 | 6th | Opted out | QR1 | | (Thailand) Yodwong Misen | 8 |
| 2023–24 | T3 South | 22 | 6 | 3 | 13 | 23 | 35 | 21 | 9th | Opted out | QR1 | Opted out | (Brazil) Jefferson Mateus | 10 |
| 2024–25 | T3 South | 22 | 4 | 5 | 13 | 18 | 35 | 17 | 11th | Opted out | QR2 | Opted out | (Thailand) Sarod Jitsanoh | 9 |
| 2025–26 | T3 South | 18 | 6 | 5 | 7 | 24 | 21 | 23 | 7th | Opted out | Opted out | LP | (Ivory Coast) Mohamed Kouadio | 11 |

| Champions | Runners-up | Third Place | Promoted | Relegated |

- P = Played
- W = Games won
- D = Games drawn
- L = Games lost
- F = Goals for
- A = Goals against
- Pts = Points
- Pos = Final position
- TPL = Thai Premier League
- QR1 = First Qualifying Round
- QR2 = Second Qualifying Round
- QR3 = Third Qualifying Round
- QR4 = Fourth Qualifying Round
- RInt = Intermediate Round
- R1 = Round 1
- R2 = Round 2
- R3 = Round 3
- R4 = Round 4
- R5 = Round 5
- R6 = Round 6
- GR = Group Stage
- QF = Quarter-finals
- SF = Semi-finals
- RU = Runners-up
- S = Shared
- W = Winners

== Coaching staff ==
| Position | Name |
|---|---|
| Chairman | (England) Russ Horsley |
| Head coach | (Thailand) Phuwanart Saengsri |
| Assistant coach | |
| Goalkeeper coach | |
| Fitness coach | |
| Performance analysis | |
| Club doctor | |
| Physiotherapist | |
| Masseur | |
| Team Manager | (England) Russ Horsley |

== Coaches ==
| Name | Nat | Period | Honours |
|---|---|---|---|
| Sirirak Konthong | (Thailand) | 2009 | |
| Arjhan Srong-ngamsub | (Thailand) | 2010 | |
| Surachai Jirasirichote | (Thailand) | 2011 | |
| Sompong Wattana | (Thailand) | 2011 | |
| Miloš Joksić | (Serbia) | 2012 | |
| Narong Ajarayut | (Thailand) | 2012 | |
| Anurak Srikerd | (Thailand) | 2012 | |
| Paniphon Kerdyam | (Thailand) | 2013 | |
| Stefano Cugurra Teco | (Brazil) | 2013 – June 2014 | |
| Suphachai Srilachai | (Thailand) | July 2014 – August 2014 | |
| Reuther Moreira | (Brazil) | August 2014 – November 2014 | |
| Trongyod Klinsrisook | (Thailand) | November 2014 – December 2015 | |
| Pittaya Phimarnman | (Thailand) | January 2016 – December 2016 | |
| Niwat Nuisa-nga | (Thailand) | January 2017 – November 2017 | |

== Players ==
As of 31 January 2025

Note: Flags indicate national team as defined under FIFA eligibility rules; some limited exceptions apply. Players may hold more than one non-FIFA nationality.

| No. | Pos. | Nation | Player |
|---|---|---|---|
| 2 | DF | NED | Kai Boham |
| 4 | DF | THA | Akkharadech Singtotong |
| 6 | MF | THA | Kanin Ketkaew |
| 7 | FW | THA | Abdulrohman Adae |
| 9 | FW | THA | Sarod Jitsanoh |
| 10 | MF | SWE | David Danielsson |
| 11 | DF | THA | Pongsakorn Klinsaowakon |
| 14 | MF | USA | Luke Pavone |
| 18 | MF | THA | Prem Seakoy |
| 19 | DF | THA | Pittaya Nuchkrasae |

| No. | Pos. | Nation | Player |
|---|---|---|---|
| 21 | MF | THA | Anucha Liankattawa |
| 27 | MF | THA | Kittinan Bunying |
| 28 | GK | THA | Thanagorn Siriuthen |
| 44 | DF | THA | Puttipong Chanchaemsri |
| 47 | MF | THA | Wuttichai Supab |
| 66 | DF | THA | Patawee Tiamtun |
| 77 | MF | THA | Worawut Sisahwat |
| 88 | MF | THA | Theerapat Leksameearunothai |
| 99 | GK | THA | Anawin Rodthanon |
