= Chumphon F.C. =

Thai football club

Chumphon FC ชุมพร เอฟซี
- Full name: Chumphon Football Club สโมสรฟุตบอลจังหวัดชุมพร
- Nicknames: The Royal Warship (เหยี่ยวแดง) (เหยี่ยวพญายม) (ขุนพลกรมหลวง)
- Founded: 2009; 17 years ago
- Ground: IPE Chumphon Stadium; Chumphon, Thailand
- Capacity: 3,000
- Chairman: Chumpol Junsai
- Manager: Chaloempol Jaroenkiattaloengkul
- League: Thai League 4
Home colours	Away colours

Chumphon Football Club (Thai สโมสรฟุตบอลจังหวัดชุมพร) is a Thai professional football club based in Chumphon Province. They currently play in Thai League 4 Southern Region.

== Timeline ==
History of events of Chumphon Football Club:

Year	Important events
2010	The club is formed as Chumphon Football Club, nicknamed The Falcons; Club admitted to the Regional League Southern Division; Home games to be played at Chumphon Stadium; Chamnan Pongjitpak named as the first ever coach of Chumphon; Finished bottom of the Regional League Southern Division
2011	Finished 9th of the Regional League Southern Division
2012	Finished 6th of the Regional League Southern Division

== Stadium and locations ==
Coordinates	Location	Stadium	Year
10°29′45″N 99°11′19″E	Chumphon	Chumphon Province Stadium	2010
10°27′23″N 99°07′44″E	Chumphon	Institute of Physical Education Chumphon Campus Stadium	2011
10°29′45″N 99°11′19″E	Chumphon	Chumphon Province Stadium	2012–2015
10°27′23″N 99°07′44″E	Chumphon	Institute of Physical Education Chumphon Campus Stadium	2016–2017
10°29′45″N 99°11′19″E	Chumphon	Chumphon Province Stadium	2017–

== Season by season record ==
Season	League									FA Cup	League Cup	Top goalscorer league	
Season	Division	P	W	D	L	F	A	Pts	Pos	FA Cup	League Cup	Name	Goals
2010	DIV2 South	24	4	6	14	22	39	18	13th				
2011	DIV2 South	24	9	4	11	25	30	31	9th				
2012	DIV2 South	20	7	6	7	27	27	27	6th				
2013	DIV2 South	20	8	10	2	22	10	34	2nd				
2014	DIV2 South	23	12	9	2	32	17	45	4th				
2015	DIV2 South	18	4	8	6	16	18	20	7th	Not Enter	Not Enter		
2016	DIV2 West	22	8	7	7	28	25	31	7th	Not Enter	Not Enter		
2017	T4 South	24	11	5	8	24	19	38	4th	Not Enter	Not Enter	(Thailand) Akarapong Pumwiset	6
2018	T4 South	21	3	8	10	24	41	17	8th	Not Enter	QR1	(Thailand) Satjaphong Samjabok	8

Champions	Runners-up	Promoted	Relegated

== Player squad ==
Note: Flags indicate national team as defined under FIFA eligibility rules; some limited exceptions apply. Players may hold more than one non-FIFA nationality.

No.	Pos.	Nation	Player
1	GK	THA	Wissanu Jattrapetch
2	DF	THA	Jedseda Tongchampa
3	DF	THA	Sun Sankhaphan
4	DF	THA	Eakluk seniwong na ayutthaya
5	DF	GHA	Disney Joseph Admah Okoe
6	DF	THA	Thirawat jaruanek
7	MF	THA	Pathai Thunyaluckpong
8	MF	THA	Sutjapong Samjabok
9	FW	THA	Surasak Thongkae
10	FW	THA	Kasem Muibong
11	FW	THA	Sutipong Yaifai
13	FW	KOR	seo yuong won
14	DF	BRA	Dos Anjos Santos Fabio
15	DF	THA	Chainarong Kak-an

No.	Pos.	Nation	Player
16	DF	THA	Kittichoke Chanmunee
17	MF	THA	Chaowalit Rumpoeipat (captain)
18	GK	THA	Chokechai Malapatee
19	MF	BRA	Filipe Pereira Da Silva Campos
20	FW	THA	Siripong Theanket
21	DF	THA	Seksan Rodthai
22	GK	THA	Thaksin Chaiyarod
23	DF	GHA	Nguti Dobgima Stanley
24	FW	THA	Wanchai Jaiwang
25	MF	THA	Samart Jankrajaang
26	DF	THA	Siraphop Tanprasit
27	FW	THA	Pairat Whansanao
29	MF	THA	Kittipong Buakaw
31	MF	THA	Satjaphong Samjabok
39	DF	THA	Jiratheep Sagate
