= Nakhon Si Thammarat F.C. =

Nakhon Si Heritage นครศรี เฮอร์ริเทจ
- Full name: Nakhon Si Heritage Football Club สโมสรฟุตบอลนครศรีเฮอริเทจ
- Nicknames: The lions of southern (ราชสีห์แดนใต้)
- Founded: 2009; 17 years ago, as Nakhon Si Thammarat Football Club (สโมสรฟุตบอลจังหวัดนครศรีธรรมราช); 2012; 14 years ago, as Nakhon Si Heritage Football Club (สโมสรฟุตบอลนครศรีเฮอริเทจ)
- Ground: -
- Capacity: -
- Chairman: -
- Manager: -
- League: -
Home colours	Away colours

Nakhon Si Heritage Football Club (Thai: สโมสรฟุตบอลนครศรีเฮอริเทจ) was a semi-professional football club in Thailand.

== History ==
Nakhon Si Thammarat is the largest province in the South of Thailand, and Nakhon Si Thammarat FC was one of the country's better-known amateur football clubs. In 1991, the club gained attention when it unexpectedly reached the final of Yamaha Thailand's Cup against professional side Bangkok FC.

In 2009, the team drew attention for going unbeaten in the first half of the season, under the management of former Thai international, Siripong Sirirat. However, they eventually narrowly missed the play-off position for Thai Division 1 League promotion, after a late loss of form. The club suffered financial issues in 2010, after 5 million baht was earmarked for a new stadium which never came to fruition due to local municipal instability.

In 2016, the club changed its name to Nakhon Si Heritage (NSTRU) F.C. It appears to have gone inactive as of 2019.

== Nickname and symbols ==
The club's nickname, The King of the Southern Sea, was chosen by fans in reference to the province's historical prominence in the Southern Thailand region. A dolphin motif, designed by a group of fans, was the club's main crest, representing its oceanfront location. The club's fans were known as 'Dolphin Warriors'.

Nakhon Si Thammarat's home colours were yellow with purple trim, and the away colours were the inverse. The club's kit was manufactured by Diadora Bangkok.

== Timeline ==
Names Teams	Logo	Nicknames	Years
Nakhon Si Thammarat F.C. (นครศรีธรรมราชเอฟซี)		สิบสองนักษัตร	2009
Nakhon Si Thammarat F.C. (นครศรีธรรมราชเอฟซี)		ราชันทะเลใต้	2010
Nakhon Si Thammarat F.C. (นครศรีธรรมราชเอฟซี)		ราชันทะเลใต้	2011
Nakhon Si Thammarat F.C. (นครศรีธรรมราชเอฟซี)		ราชันทะเลใต้	2012
Nakhon Si Heritage F.C. (นครศรี เฮอริเทจ)		นักบุญทะเลใต้	2013
Nakhon Si Heritage F.C. (นครศรี เฮอริเทจ)		นักบุญทะเลใต้	2014
Nakhon Si Heritage NSTRU F.C. (นครศรี เฮอริเทจ เอ็นเอสทีอาร์ยู)		ขุนพลแดนใต้	2015
Nakhon Si Heritage NSTRU F.C. (นครศรี เฮอริเทจ เอ็นเอสทีอาร์ยู)		ขุนพลแดนใต้	2016
Nakhon Si Heritage NSTRU F.C. (นครศรี เฮอริเทจ เอ็นเอสทีอาร์ยู)		ราชสีห์แดนใต้	2018

== Stadium and locations ==
Coordinates	Location	Stadium	Capacity	Year
8°11′55″N 99°52′08″E	Nakhon Si Thammarat	Nakhon Si Thammarat PAO. Stadium	20,000	2009–2010
8°27′17″N 99°57′29″E	Nakhon Si Thammarat	Nakhon Si Thammarat Province Stadium	5,000	2011–2012
8°11′55″N 99°52′08″E	Nakhon Si Thammarat	Nakhon Si Thammarat PAO. Stadium	20,000	2013–2014
8°38′59″N 99°52′43″E	Nakhon Si Thammarat	Walailak University Stadium	5,000	2014–2015
8°11′55″N 99°52′08″E	Nakhon Si Thammarat	Nakhon Si Thammarat PAO. Stadium	20,000	2016–2017
8°27′56″N 99°51′38″E	Nakhon Si Thammarat	Nakhon Si Thammarat Rajabhat University Stadium	5,000	2018–present

== Season by season record ==
Season	League									FA Cup	League Cup	Top goalscorer	
Season	Division	P	W	D	L	F	A	Pts	Pos	FA Cup	League Cup	Name	Goals
2009	DIV2 South	14	6	4	4	30	26	22	3rd				
2010	DIV2 South	24	6	6	12	31	46	24	11th				
2011	DIV2 South	24	3	5	16	17	51	14	13th				
2012	DIV2 South	20	5	11	4	18	20	26	7th				
2013	DIV2 South	20	4	7	9	24	36	19	9th				
2014	DIV2 South	22	2	7	13	18	36	13	12th				
2015	DIV2 South	18	2	10	6	15	26	16	9th	Not Enter	QR1		
2016	DIV2 South	22	2	6	14	17	37	12	12th	Not Enter	Not Enter		
2017	Not Enter												
2018	TA Upper South												

Champions	Runners-up	Promoted	Relegated

- P = Played
- W = Games won
- D = Games drawn
- L = Games lost
- F = Goals for
- A = Goals against
- Pts = Points
- Pos = Final position
- QR1 = First Qualifying Round
- QR2 = Second Qualifying Round
- R1 = Round 1
- R2 = Round 2
- R3 = Round 3
- R4 = Round 4
- R5 = Round 5
- R6 = Round 6
- QF = Quarter-finals
- SF = Semi-finals
- RU = Runners-up
- W = Winners

== Youth Team ==
=== U13 Team ===
Season	League									Top goalscorer	
Season	Division	P	W	D	L	F	A	Pts	Pos	Name	Goals
2016–17	TYL South	12	5	3	4	21	27	18	4th		
2017–18	TYL South								3rd		

=== U17 Team ===
Season	League									Top goalscorer	
Season	Division	P	W	D	L	F	A	Pts	Pos	Name	Goals
2016–17	TYL South	10	4	4	2	13	13	16	2nd		
