= Mae Fah Luang University Stadium =

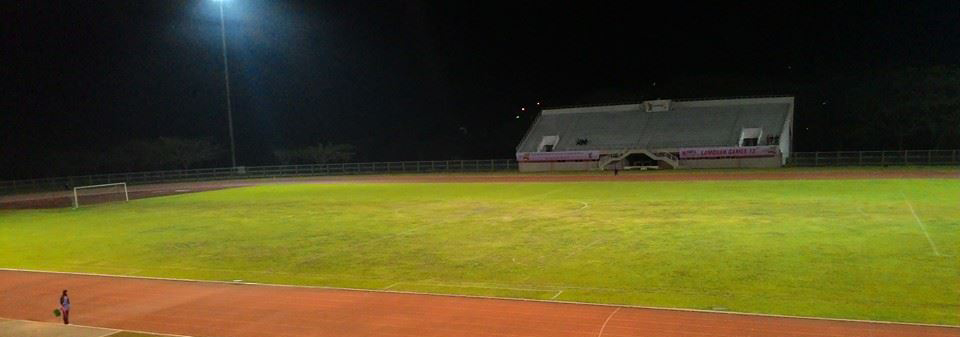
- Interactive map of Mae Fah Luang University Stadium
- Location: Chiang Rai, Thailand
- Coordinates: 20°03′29″N 99°53′45″E
- Owner: Mae Fah Luang University
- Operator: Mae Fah Luang University
- Capacity: 3,346
- Surface: Grass

Tenant
- Chiangrai United F.C. 2009-2012

Mae Fah Luang University Stadium (Thai: สนามฟุตบอลมหาวิทยาลัยแม่ฟ้าหลวง) is a multi-purpose stadium in Chiang Rai Province, Thailand. It is currently used mostly for football matches. It was the home stadium of Chiangrai United F.C. from 2009 to 2012. The stadium holds 3,346 people.
