= Surat Thani F.C. =

Thai football club

Surat Thani FC สุราษฎร์ธานี เอฟซี
- Full name: Surat Thani Football Club สโมสรฟุตบอลจังหวัดสุราษฎร์ธานี
- Nicknames: The Roosters (ไก่พิฆาต)
- Short name: SRTFC
- Founded: 1999; 27 years ago
- Ground: Surat Thani Stadium; Surat Thani, Thailand
- Capacity: 10,175
- Chairman: Rangson Mathuramethawee
- Manager: Choem Indrakul
- Coach: Rachan Sarakum
- League: Thailand Amateur League
- 2021–22: Thai League 3, 13th of 13 in the Southern region (relegated)
| Home colours | Away colours |

Surat Thani Football Club (Thai: สโมสรฟุตบอลจังหวัดสุราษฎร์ธานี) is a Thailand football club, nicknamed The Roosters and based in Surat Thani Province located in the south of Thailand. The club last played in the Thailand Amateur League Southern region.

== History ==
The club was founded in 1998 From there, founded in 1999 participated in the Thailand Provincial League of Football League in parallel to the Thai League and headed by the Sports Authority of Thailand (SAT). In the founding year of the league in 1999, they reached the 9th place. Until the 2006 season, ran it for the team not much better. With a 7th-place finished the 2006 season could produce the best result so far.

In 2007, Surat Thani started their new season in Division 1 after the Provincial League was merged with Thailand premier League, Division 1, and Division 2. The biggest success of the club's history was certainly achieved in the quarterfinals of the Thai FA Cup in 2009 before the Roosters was 0–3 eliminated by TTM Samut Sakhon. However, the Roosters was relegated to the third-tier Regional League after finished the 14th place out of 16 teams in Division 1.

== Stadium and locations ==
| Coordinates | Location | Stadium | Capacity | Year |
|---|---|---|---|---|
| 9°08′06″N 99°20′51″E | Surat Thani | Surat Thani Province Stadium | 10,000 | 1999–present |

== Season by season record ==
| Season | League | | | | | | | | | FA Cup | League Cup | Top goalscorer | |
| Season | Division | P | W | D | L | F | A | Pts | Pos | FA Cup | League Cup | Name | Goals |
|---|---|---|---|---|---|---|---|---|---|---|---|---|---|
| 1999/2000 | Pro League | 22 | 5 | 8 | 9 | | | 23 | 9th | | No competition | | |
| 2001 | Pro League | 22 | | | | | | | 9th | | No competition | | |
| 2002 | Pro League | | | | | | | | | No competition | No competition | | |
| 2003 | Pro League | 22 | 4 | 6 | 12 | | | 18 | 10th | No competition | No competition | | |
| 2004 | Pro League | 18 | 4 | 5 | 9 | | | 17 | 8th | No competition | No competition | | |
| 2005 | Pro League | | | | | | | | | | | | |
| 2006 | Pro League | 30 | 11 | 8 | 11 | 44 | 46 | 41 | 7th | not enter | | | |
| 2007 | DIV1 A | 22 | 7 | 7 | 8 | 31 | 42 | 28 | 6th | Not Enter | | | |
| 2008 | DIV1 | 30 | 10 | 7 | 13 | 36 | 38 | 37 | 12th | Not Enter | | Mana Lakchum | 10 |
| 2009 | DIV1 | 30 | 8 | 6 | 16 | 39 | 58 | 30 | 14th | Quarter-final | | | |
| 2010 | DIV2 South | 24 | 10 | 6 | 8 | 36 | 36 | 36 | 5th | Not Enter | | | |
| 2011 | DIV2 South | 24 | 8 | 4 | 12 | 34 | 31 | 28 | 10th | | | | |
| 2012 | DIV2 South | 20 | 2 | 8 | 10 | 15 | 30 | 14 | 10th | | | | |
| 2013 | DIV2 South | 20 | 5 | 10 | 5 | 20 | 21 | 25 | 6th | | | | |
| 2014 | DIV2 South | 24 | 6 | 8 | 10 | 26 | 40 | 26 | 7th | | | | |
| 2015 | DIV2 South | 18 | 5 | 4 | 9 | 13 | 26 | 19 | 8th | Not Enter | QR2 | | |
| 2016 | DIV2 South | 22 | 13 | 6 | 3 | 33 | 21 | 45 | 1st | Not Enter | QR2 | | |
| 2017 | T3 Lower | 28 | 7 | 9 | 12 | 34 | 40 | 30 | 10th | Not Enter | Not Enter | (Ivory Coast) Soumahoro Mafa | 9 |
| 2018 | T3 Lower | 26 | 6 | 8 | 12 | 34 | 49 | 26 | 10th | Not Enter | Qualification play-off | (Ivory Coast) Mohamed Kourouma | 12 |
| 2019 | T3 Lower | 26 | 1 | 5 | 20 | 20 | 72 | 8 | 14th | | | (Thailand) Amarin Chaisuesat | 3 |
| 2020–21 | T3 South | 16 | 3 | 1 | 12 | 11 | 53 | 10 | 11th | Not enter | QR1 | (Iran) Mohammadrafie Milad Sasani Nezhad | 3 |
| 2021–22 | T3 South | 24 | 0 | 3 | 21 | 10 | 77 | 3 | 13th | Not enter | Not enter | (Thailand) Anusak Chitrattha | 3 |

| Champions | Runners-up | Promoted | Relegated |

== Honours ==
- Regional League South Division
  - Winner : 2016

== 2022 players ==
As of 4 January 2022

Note: Flags indicate national team as defined under FIFA eligibility rules; some limited exceptions apply. Players may hold more than one non-FIFA nationality.

| No. | Pos. | Nation | Player |
|---|---|---|---|
| 6 | DF | THA | Watcharin Doungthong |
| 9 | FW | RSA | Mahodi Nelson |
| 11 | MF | THA | Thanasit Wiroonchutiporn |
| 14 | FW | THA | Wasan Jantan |
| 19 | MF | THA | Sivarat Apinantachat |
| 23 | DF | THA | Phisut Billee |
| 29 | MF | THA | Khanchit Wannaphakdi |
| 30 | GK | THA | Suwit Sarapee |
| 31 | MF | THA | Puwadech Noopeng |
| 32 | DF | THA | Weerapat Chankaeodet |
| 33 | MF | THA | Sarayut Mueangchan |
| 34 | MF | THA | Adisorn Hemprapan |
| 35 | FW | THA | Junlajak Phunphoem |

| No. | Pos. | Nation | Player |
|---|---|---|---|
| 36 | MF | THA | Thakdanai Phraekthong |
| 37 | GK | THA | Tharawit Sala |
| 38 | MF | THA | Worapong Ma-aiam |
| 39 | MF | THA | Peerapon Kaikaew |
| 40 | GK | THA | Pumai Naknuai |
| 44 | MF | THA | Nattawat Theptongkul |
| 45 | MF | THA | Supasek Promsorn |
| 46 | MF | THA | Wiritpon Pakkayyasit |
| 47 | FW | THA | Peerapol Kaewprakob |
| 72 | GK | THA | Akarapon Phatcham |
| 80 | DF | THA | Atthaphon Rueangkhajohn |
| 88 | MF | THA | Kritsada Krangnarong |
| 99 | GK | THA | Nattawat Sanoh |
