= 2013 Regional League Division 2 Bangkok Metropolitan Region =

Regional League Bangkok Metropolitan Region
- Season: 2013

2013 Regional League Division 2 Bangkok Metropolitan Region is the 5th season of the League competition since its establishment in 2009. It is in the third tier of the Thai football league system.

== Changes from last season ==
=== Team changes ===
==== Promoted clubs ====
Rayong United were promoted to the 2013 Thai Division 1 League.

==== Relocated clubs ====
Paknampho NSRU re-located to the Regional League Bangkok Area Division from the Regional League Northern Division 2012.

Thai Airways-Look Isan moved into the Central-East Division 2013.

Globlex, Krung Thonburi, Samut Sakhon, Thonburi BG United have all been moved into the Central-West Division 2013.

==== Withdrawn clubs ====
Central Lions have withdrawn from the 2013 campaign.

==== Expansion clubs ====
Laem Chabang joined the newly expanded league setup.

== Stadium and locations ==
Locations of the Thai Premier League 2013 teams
Football clubs in Bangkok Metropolitan Region

Team	Location	Stadium	Capacity	Ref.
Assumption Thonburi	Bangkok	Assumption Thonburi School Stadium (Wongprachanukul Stadium)	?	
Bangkok Christian College	Bangkok	PAT Stadium	12,308	
Chamchuri United	Pathum Thani	Bangkok University Stadium	5,000	
Customs United	Samut Prakan	Lad Krabang 54 Stadium	?	
Kasem Bundit University	Bangkok	Kasem Bundit University Stadium (Rom Klao)	2,000	
Kasetsart University	Bangkok	Intree Chantarasatit Stadium	3,275	
Laem Chabang City	Chonburi	Laem Chabang municipal Stadium	?	
North Bangkok College	Pathum Thani	North Bangkok University Stadium (Rangsit)	1,000	
Nonthaburi	Nonthaburi	Nonthaburi Provincial Stadium (Wat Bot Don Prom)	1,300	
Paknampho NSRU	Nakhon Sawan	Nakhon Sawan Sport School Stadium	1,000	
Raj-Vithi	Bangkok Bangkok	Klong Chan Sports Center Boonyachinda Stadium	? 3,500	
RBAC-BEC Tero Sasana	Bangkok	RBAC University Stadium	1,000	
Samut Prakan United	Samut Prakan	Samut Prakan United Stadium	2,000	
Thai Honda	Bangkok	King Mongkut's Institute of Technology Ladkrabang Stadium	3,500	

== League table ==
Pos	Team	Pld	W	D	L	GF	GA	GD	Pts	Qualification
1	Paknampho NSRU (C, Q)	26	17	3	6	49	26	+23	54	Champions League Round
2	Kasetsart University (Q)	26	14	6	6	36	23	+13	48	Champions League Round
3	Bangkok Christian College	26	14	4	8	35	27	+8	46	
4	Customs United	26	13	6	7	28	20	+8	45	
5	Thai Honda	26	11	6	9	37	34	+3	39	
6	Assumption Thonburi	26	10	8	8	33	26	+7	38	
7	Kasem Bundit University	26	10	8	8	39	34	+5	38	
8	North Bangkok College	26	9	8	9	36	34	+2	35	
9	Samut Prakan United	26	8	8	10	23	31	−8	32	
10	RBAC-BEC Tero Sasana	26	8	7	11	32	34	−2	31	
11	Nonthaburi	26	9	3	14	34	40	−6	30	
12	Chamchuri United	26	7	7	12	32	45	−13	28	
13	Raj-Vithi	26	6	5	15	23	41	−18	23	
14	Laem Chabang City	26	1	11	14	20	41	−21	14	

Rules for classification: 1) points; 2) head-to-head points; 3) head-to-head goal difference; 4) head-to-head goals scored; 5) goal difference; 6) number of goals scored.
(C) Champions; (Q) Qualified for the phase indicated
