= Pattani F.C. =

Thai football club

Pattani ปัตตานี เอฟซี
- Full name: Pattani Football Club สโมสรฟุตบอลจังหวัดปัตตานี
- Nicknames: The Gunners (เดอะ กันเนอร์ส); The Queen Cannons (ปืนใหญ่พญาตานี); The Langkasuka Cannons (ปืนใหญ่ลังกาสุกะ)
- Founded: 2009; 17 years ago
- Ground: Rainbow Stadium; Pattani, Thailand
- Capacity: 12,000
- Chairman: Worawit Baru
- Head coach: Harnarong Chunhakunakorn
- League: Thai League 1
- 2025–26: Thai League 2, 3rd (promoted via play-offs)
Home colours	Away colours

Pattani Football Club (Thai: สโมสรฟุตบอลจังหวัดปัตตานี) is a Thai football club based in Pattani Province. The club currently play in the Thai League 1, the top tier of Thai football after promotion from Thai League 2 in 2025–26.

== History ==
In 2022, Pattani competed in the Thai League 3. The club started the season with a 0–0 away draw with Young Singh Hatyai United and ended with a 1–2 home defeat to Young Singh Hatyai United. The club has finished 4th in the Southern region. In addition, in the 2022–23 Thai League Cup, Pattani was defeated 1–3 by MH Nakhon Si City in the second qualification round.

In 2024–25, Pattani secured promotion to the Thai League 2 for the first time in their history after winning against North Bangkok University in the Thai League 3 promotion play-off.

On 23 May 2026, Pattani secure promotion to Thai League 1 for the first time in their history from next season after defeat Nongbua Pitchaya on penalties 5–4 due to aggregate 3–3 and ended one year stay in second tier.

== Stadiums and locations ==
Coordinates	Location	Stadium	Capacity	Year
6°53′20″N 101°14′39″E	Pattani	Rainbow Stadium (Pattani Province Stadium)	8,000	2009–

== Season by season record ==
Season	League									FA Cup	League Cup	T3 Cup	Top goalscorer	
Season	Division	P	W	D	L	F	A	Pts	Pos	FA Cup	League Cup	T3 Cup	Name	Goals
2009	South	14	6	2	6	24	25	20	4th	Opted out				
2010	South	24	8	7	9	28	28	31	7th	Opted out	Opted out			
2011	South	24	13	5	6	30	20	44	3rd	Opted out	Opted out			
2012	South	20	9	9	2	26	16	36	2nd	Opted out	Opted out		(Cameroon) Mohammadou Al Hadji	12
2013	South	20	4	5	11	18	25	17	9th	Opted out	Opted out		(Egypt) Ahmed Toota	6
2014	South	24	10	12	2	30	16	42	5th	R2	Opted out		(Syria) Ahmed Kodmany	7
2015	South	18	10	4	4	25	12	34	2nd	Opted out	R1		(Cameroon) Elvis Job	5
2016	South	22	10	4	8	34	31	34	5th	Opted out	R1		(Cameroon) Elvis Job	12
2017	T4 South	24	15	3	6	31	18	48	3rd	Opted out	QR2		(Ivory Coast) Ibrahim Dicko	14
2018	T4 South	21	11	7	3	34	22	40	2nd	Opted out	QR1		(Madagascar) Dimitri Carlos Zozimar	10
2019	T4 South	24	12	7	5	34	20	43	2nd	Opted out	QR1		(Georgia (country)) Georgi Tsimakuridze	13
2020–21	T3 South	16	7	7	2	19	7	28	5th	Opted out	QR2		(Thailand) Chakris Tiaiadyo	6
2021–22	T3 South	24	6	8	10	27	29	26	10th	Opted out	QR1		(Thailand) Chakris Tiaiadyo	8
2022–23	T3 South	22	10	6	6	34	27	36	4th	Opted out	QR2		(Thailand) Pithak Abdulrahman	7
2023–24	T3 South	22	13	4	5	45	24	43	3rd	Opted out	QRP	R2	(Brazil) Natan Oliveira	21
2024–25	T3 South	22	11	6	5	26	18	39	2nd	Opted out	QR2	LP	(Brazil) Romário Alves	4
2025–26	T2	34	16	10	8	49	45	58	3rd	R3	QF	–	(Brazil) Carlos Neto	16

Champions	Runners-up	Promoted	Relegated

== Players ==
=== Current squad ===
As of 1 September 2026

Note: Flags indicate national team as defined under FIFA eligibility rules; some limited exceptions apply. Players may hold more than one non-FIFA nationality.

No.	Pos.	Nation	Player
1	GK	THA	Ninuruddin Nideha
2	DF	THA	Ekkachai Sumrei
3	DF	BRA	Rodolfo Filemon
4	DF	THA	Nattayot Phonyiam
5	DF	THA	Nattawut Salae
7	FW	THA	Adithep Chaipraman
8	MF	BRA	Clayton Da Silva
9	FW	BRA	Igor Neves
10	MF	BRA	Felipe Nunes
11	FW	THA	Janepob Phokhi
13	GK	BUL	Damyan Damyanov
15	MF	THA	Nattanan Biesamrit
17	FW	ESP	Nacho Abeledo
19	DF	THA	Ittipon Khampliw

No.	Pos.	Nation	Player
20	DF	BRA	Maicon Douglas Alves
21	FW	FRA	Jean-Pierre Da Sylva
22	DF	THA	Boontawee Theppawong
24	MF	THA	Chaiyawat Buran
26	DF	BRA	Marlon Silva (captain)
30	MF	THA	Adam Lassamano
32	DF	THA	Anuwa Koowing
36	DF	THA	Kittipong Buathong
40	MF	THA	Kirati Kaewnongdang
42	MF	THA	Naruephon Proomimas
46	GK	THA	Sorawat Phosaman (on loan from Port)
64	MF	THA	Thirapak Prueangna (on loan from Buriram United)
90	FW	THA	Imron Hayiyusoh
96	FW	BRA	Carlos Neto
99	GK	THA	Muhammat Mamah

== Affiliated clubs ==
- (Thailand) Buriram United
- (Thailand) Songkhla
- (Thailand) Yala
- (Malaysia) Terengganu FC
