= Yala City Municipality Stadium =

Yala City municipality Stadium
- Interactive map of Yala City municipality Stadium
- Location: Yala, Thailand
- Coordinates: 6°34′41″N 101°17′50″E
- Capacity: 3,000
- Surface: Grass

Tenant
- Yala F.C.

Yala City municipality Stadium (Thai: สนามเทศบาลนครยะลา) is a multi-purpose stadium in Yala province, Thailand. The stadium has an athletic track but it is currently used mostly for football matches and is the home stadium of Yala F.C. The stadium has a capacity of 3,000.
