= Nakhon Si Thammarat Province Stadium =

- Interactive map of Nakhon Si Thammarat Province Stadium
- Location: Nakhon Si Thammarat, Thailand
- Coordinates: 8°27′17″N 99°57′29″E
- Capacity: 5,000
- Surface: Grass

Tenants
- Nakhon Si Thammarat 2011; Nakhon Si United 2021–

Nakhon Si Thammarat Province Stadium (Thai: สนามกีฬากลางจังหวัดนครศรีธรรมราช) is a multi-purpose stadium in Nakhon Si Thammarat province, Thailand. It is currently used mostly for football matches and is the home stadium of Nakhon Si United. The stadium holds 5,000 people.
