= Krabi Provincial Stadium =

Stadium in Krabi, Thailand

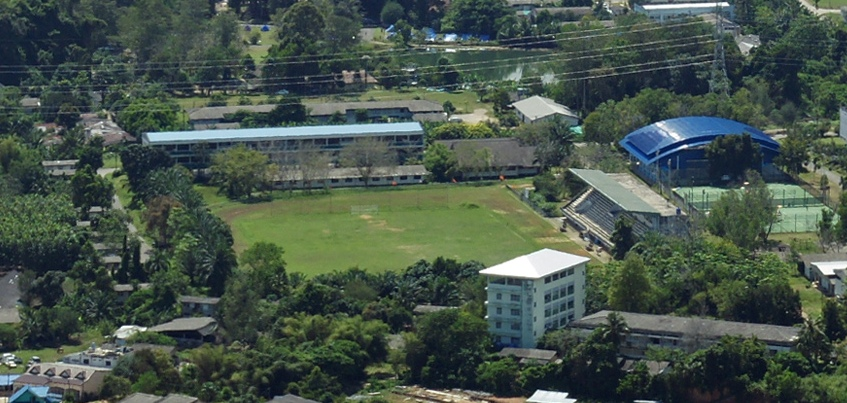
- Interactive map of Krabi Provincial Stadium
- Location: Krabi, Thailand
- Coordinates: 8°06′30″N 98°55′00″E
- Owner: Krabi Municipality
- Operator: Krabi Municipality
- Capacity: 8,000
- Surface: Grass

Tenant
- Krabi F.C.

Krabi Provincial Stadium (Thai: สนามกีฬากลางจังหวัดกระบี่) is a stadium in Krabi, Thailand. It is currently used for football matches and is the home stadium of Krabi F.C. The stadium holds 8,000 spectators.
