= 2009 Regional League Division 2 Bangkok Metropolitan Region =

Regional League Division 2 Bangkok Metropolitan Region
- Season: 2009
- Champions: Raj Pracha; 1st title
- Biggest home win: Raj-Vithi 6-0 Kasetsart University; Kasem Bundit University 6-0 Bangkok
- Biggest away win: Bangkok Christian College 1-4 Raj Pracha; Rangsit University 1-4 Kasem Bundit University
- Highest scoring: Kasem Bundit University 5-2 Kasetsart University; Raj-Vithi 5-2 Kasem Bundit University (7)

2009 Regional League Division 2 Bangkok Metropolitan Region (Thai: ลีกภูมิภาค กรุงเทพและปริมณฑล or ไทยลีกดิวิชัน 2 กรุงเทพและปริมณฑล) is the 3rd Level League in Thailand. In 2009, it included 10 clubs from the Bangkok Metropolitan region.

== Changes from last season ==
from Khǒr Royal Cup (ถ้วย ข.) 2008

- Kasetsart University Winner
- Nakhon Sawan Rajabhat University Runner-Up

== Stadium and locations ==
Locations of the 2009 Regional League Division 2 Bangkok & Field Region teams
Football clubs in Bangkok Metropolitan Region

Team	Location	Stadium	Capacity
Bangkok Christian College	Bang Kapi, Bangkok	Ramkhamhaeng University Stadium	?
Bangkok	Min Buri, Bangkok	72-years Anniversary Stadium	10,000
North Bangkok College	Pathum Thani	Bangkok University Stadium	5,000
Kasetsart University	Chatuchak, Bangkok	Intree Chantarasatit Stadium	?
Kasem Bundit University	Min Buri, Bangkok	Kasem Bundit University Stadium	2,000
Rangsit University	Pathumthani	Thammasat Stadium	25,000
Nakhon Sawan Rajabhat University	Nakhon Sawan	Nakhon Sawan Sports School Stadium	2000
Raj Pracha	Nonthaburi	Nonthaburi Provincial Stadium	1,300
Raj-Vithi	Nong Chok, Bangkok	BEC Tero Sasana Nong Jork Stadium	?
North-Sarawitaya	Pathum Thani	Chaloem Phra Kiat Stadium (Khlong 6)	?

== Final league table ==
Pos	Team	Pld	W	D	L	GF	GA	GD	Pts	Qualification
1	Raj Pracha (C)	18	13	4	1	30	10	+20	43	Regional League Championships entrant
2	Kasem Bundit University	18	10	4	4	41	22	+19	34	
3	North Bangkok College	18	8	7	3	25	21	+4	31	
4	Raj-Vithi	18	8	5	5	35	24	+11	29	
5	Bangkok Christian College	18	7	3	8	27	25	+2	24	
6	Bangkok	18	5	7	6	18	25	−7	22	
7	Kasetsart University	18	4	6	8	22	32	−10	18 (Note: Kasetsart University win 3-1)	
8	Rangsit University	18	5	3	10	13	27	−14	18	
9	Nakhon Sawan Rajabhat University	18	2	9	7	12	19	−7	15	
10	North-Sarawitaya	18	2	4	12	18	36	−18	10	

(C) Champions
Notes:
- Rules for classification: 1st points; 2nd head-to-head; 3rd goal difference; 4th goals scored

== Results ==
Home \ Away	BCC	BBR	NBC	KSU	KBU	RSU	NSRU	RPR	RVT	NSW
Bangkok Christian College		0–0	0–1	3–1	0–0	0–1	1–2	1–4	3–0	3–1
Bangkok	3–3		1–1	1–1	0–2	1–0	1–1	1–2	1–3	1–0
North Bangkok College	0–3	1–0		3–2	1–1	2–0	0–0	2–0	0–3	3–1
Kasetsart University	3–1	1–1	1–2		3–1	1–1	0–0	0–2	0–0	2–2
Kasem Bundit University	0–3	6–0	2–2	5–2		3–1	0–0	0–1	3–2	5–1
Rangsit University	1–0	0–2	2–1	0–2	1–4		0–0	0–1	0–3	3–2
Nakhon Sawan Rajabhat University	1–2	0–1	1–1	1–0	0–2	1–1		1–2	1–2	2–2
Raj Pracha	3–0	1–1	2–2	1–0	2–0	2–0	2–0		1–1	2–0
Raj-Vithi	2–3	1–0	2–2	6–0	3–4	2–1	2–1	1–1		2–2
North-Sarawitaya	2–1	2–3	0–1	2–3	0–3	0–1	0–0	0–1	1–0	

Source: Football Association of Thailand website
Legend: Blue = home team win; Yellow = draw; Red = away team win.
