= Chira Nakhon Stadium =

Football stadium in Thailand

Chiranakhon Stadium
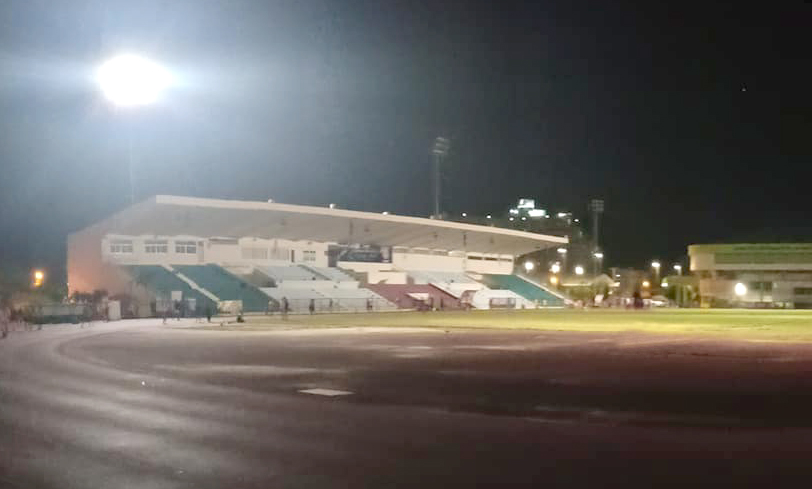
- Interactive map of Chiranakhon Stadium
- Location: Hat Yai, Songkhla, Thailand
- Coordinates: 7°01′13″N 100°28′18″E
- Owner: Hat Yai Municipality Office
- Operator: Hat Yai Municipality Office
- Capacity: 25,000

Construction
- Opened: 1944

Tenants
- Thailand National Games (1969, 1989); Songkhla (2010); Hatyai F.C. (2010) (2012–present); Young Singh Hatyai United F.C. (2017–2018)

Chiranakhon Stadium (Thai: สนามกีฬาจิระนคร) is a football stadium in Hat Yai, Songkhla Thailand. It was the home stadium of Young Singh Hatyai United F.C., Hatyai F.C. and Songkhla F.C.. The stadium holds 25,000 spectators and opened in 1944.
