= Phang Nga Province Stadium =

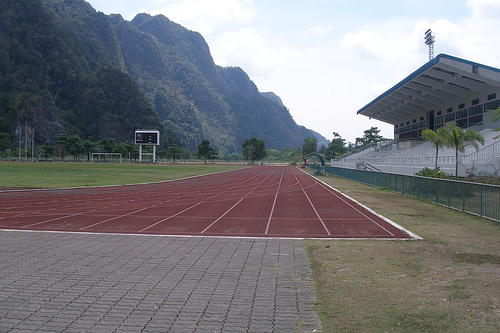
- Interactive map of Phang Nga Province Stadium
- Location: Phang Nga, Thailand
- Coordinates: 8°26′59″N 98°32′08″E
- Capacity: 3,000
- Surface: Grass

Tenant
- Phang Nga F.C. 2010

Phang Nga Province Stadium (Thai: สนามกีฬาจังหวัดจังหวัดพังงา หรือ สนาม อบจ.พังงา หรือ สนามเทศบาลเมืองพังงา) is a multi-purpose stadium in Phang Nga, Phang Nga Province, Thailand. It is currently used mostly for football matches and is the home stadium of Phang Nga F.C. The stadium holds 3,000 people.
