= Surat Thani Province Stadium =

Football stadium in Surat Thani, Thailand

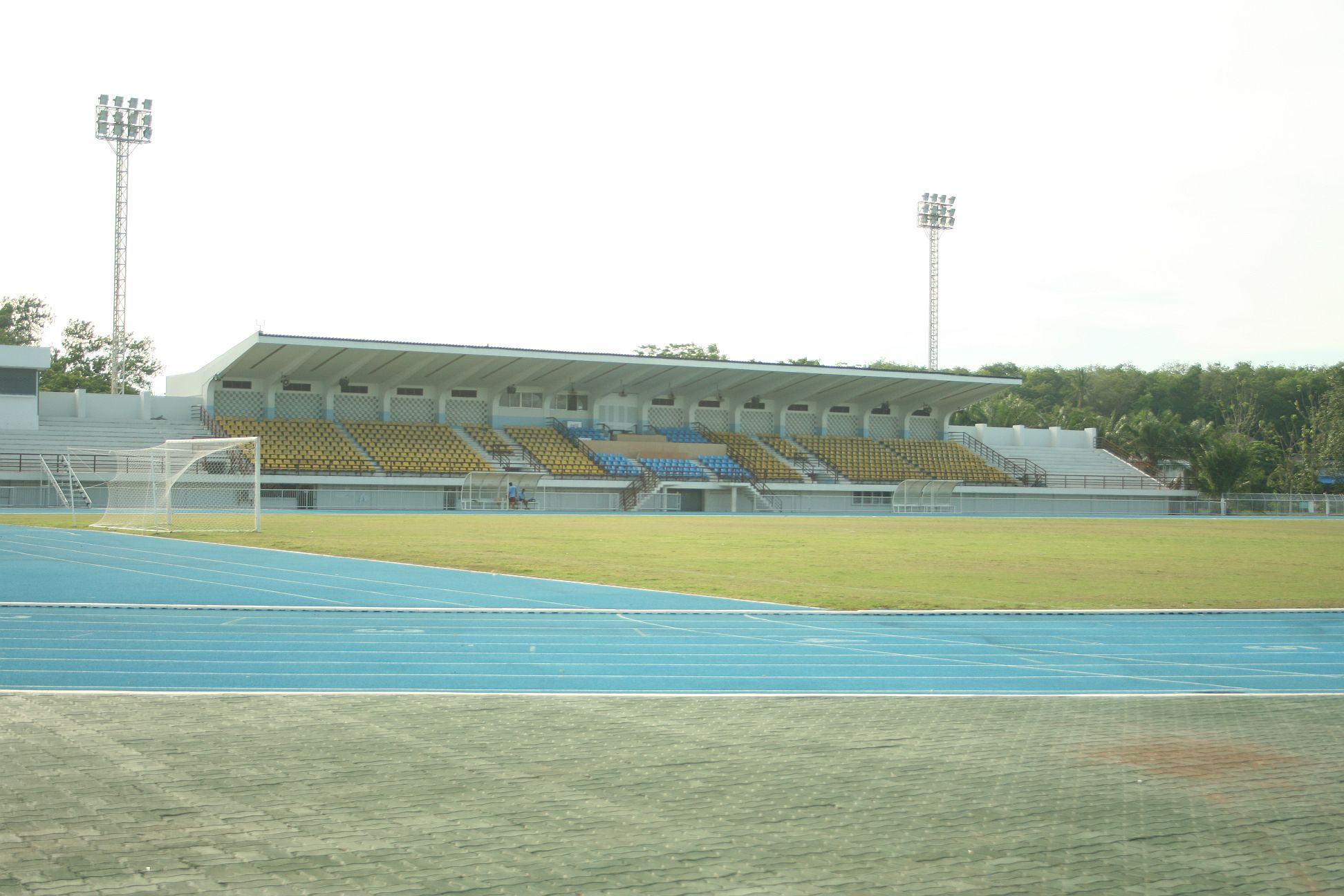
- Interactive map of Surat Thani Province Stadium
- Location: Surat Thani, Thailand
- Coordinates: 9°08′06″N 99°20′51″E
- Owner: Surat Thani Provincial Administration Organization
- Operator: Surat Thani Provincial Administration Organization
- Capacity: 10,000

Tenant
- Surat Thani F.C. 2010-2012

Surat Thani Province Stadium (Thai: สนามกีฬากลางจังหวัดสุราษฎร์ธานี) is a football stadium in Surat Thani, Thailand. It is the home stadium of Surat Thani F.C. The stadium holds 10,000 spectators.
