= Satun Provincial Administrative Organization Stadium =

Multi-purpose stadium in Thailand

- Interactive map of Satun Provincial Administrative Organization Stadium
- Location: Satun, Thailand
- Coordinates: 6°39′05″N 100°04′43″E
- Capacity: 5,000
- Surface: Grass

Tenant
- Satun United F.C. 2010-2012

Satun Provincial Administrative Organization Stadium (Thai: สนาม อบจ.สตูล หรือ สนามกีฬาจังหวัดสตูล) is a multi-purpose stadium in Satun Province, Thailand. It is currently used mostly for football matches and is the home stadium of Satun F.C. The stadium holds 5,000 people.
