= Pattani Province Stadium =

Multi-purpose stadium in Pattani Province, Thailand

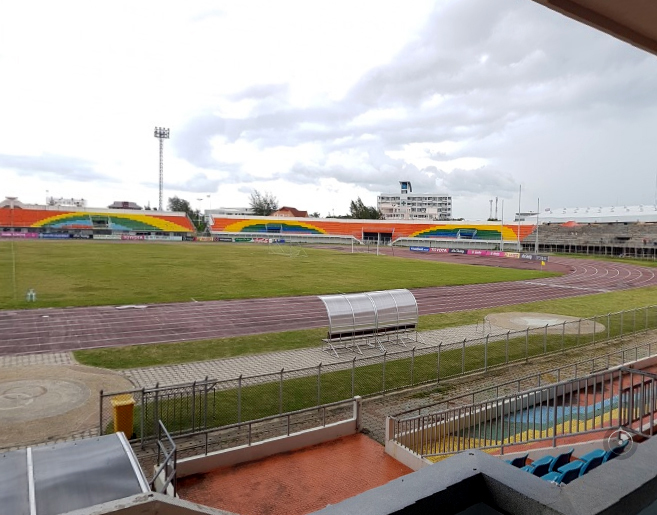
- Interactive map of Pattani Province Stadium
- Location: Pattani, Thailand
- Coordinates: 6°53′20″N 101°14′39″E
- Capacity: 8,000
- Surface: Grass

Tenant
- Pattani FC 2009-

Pattani Province Stadium or Pattani Municipality Stadium or Rainbow Stadium (Thai: สนามกีฬาจังหวัดปัตตานี หรือ สนามกีฬาเทศบาลเมืองปัตตานี หรือ สนามกีฬาเรนโบว์) is a multi-purpose stadium in Pattani Province, Thailand. It is currently used mostly for football matches and is the home stadium of Pattani FC. The stadium holds 8,000 people.
