= Don Sak district =

Don Sak ดอนสัก
- District
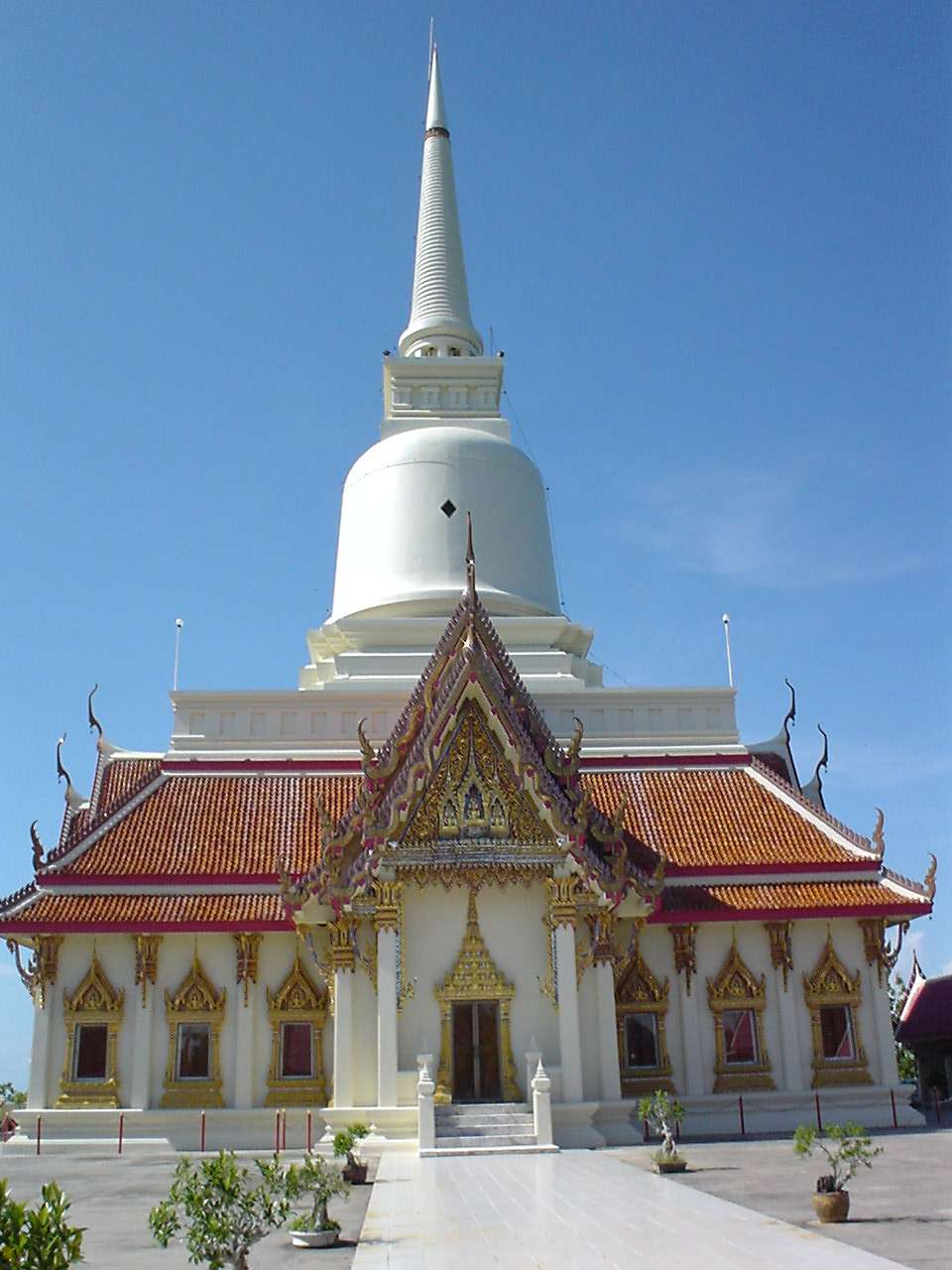
- Wat Khao Suwan Pradit

- District location in Surat Thani province
- Coordinates: 9°18′50″N 99°41′25″E
- Country: Thailand
- Province: Surat Thani
- Seat: Don Sak

Area
  - Total: 460.9 km^{2} (178.0 sq mi)

Population (2005)
  - Total: 35,468
  - Density: 77/km^{2} (200/sq mi)
- Time zone: UTC+7 (ICT)
- Postal code: 84220
- Geocode: 8403

Don Sak (Thai: ดอนสัก, pronounced [dɔ̄ːn sàk]) is a district (amphoe) in eastern Surat Thani province. The two principal ferry companies offering service to Samui Island leave from piers in the district.

Neighboring districts are (from the east clockwise): Khanom and Sichon, Nakhon Si Thammarat province); and Kanchanadit of Surat Thani. To the north is the Gulf of Thailand, with islands encompassed by the Ko Samui District.

== History ==
Originally, the area of the district was part of Sichon district, Nakhon Si Thammarat Province. In 1929 the two sub-districts Don Sak and Chaiyakhram were reassigned to Kanchanadit District. The district was created as a minor district (king amphoe) on 24 March 1969 by splitting the two tambons, Don Sak and Chonlakhram, from Kanchanadit District. The citizens of tambon Chaiyakhram then asked to be included in the new district as well, which was added on 1 September of the same year. On 16 November 1971 it was promoted to full district status. The fourth tambon, Pak Prak, was created on 14 July 1978 from tambons Don Sak and Chaiyakhram.

== Administrative divisions ==
Don Sak District is divided into four sub-districts (tambons), which are further subdivided into 40 villages (mubans). All four tambons are administered by a tambon administrative organization (TAO). Don Sak itself has township (thesaban tambon) status and covers part of tambon Don Sak.

No.	Name	Thai name	Villages	Pop.
1.	Don Sak	ดอนสัก	14	18,634
2.	Chonlakhram	ชลคราม	6	2,250
3.	Chaiyakhram	ไชยคราม	5	2,011
4.	Pak Prak	ปากแพรก	15	12,573

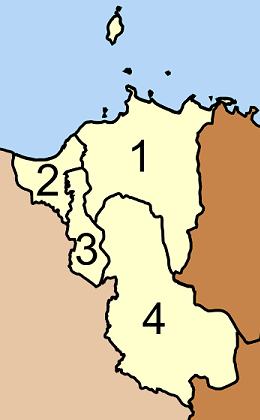

== Transport ==
Two ferry companies, Raja Ferry and Seatran, provide regular service to Samui and Pha Ngan Islands from piers in Don Sak. Travellers transiting from Surat Thani Airport en route to these islands typically embark from Don Sak.
