= Wat Phra Mahathat =

Ancient Buddhist Temple in Thailand

Wat Phra Mahathat Woramahawihan
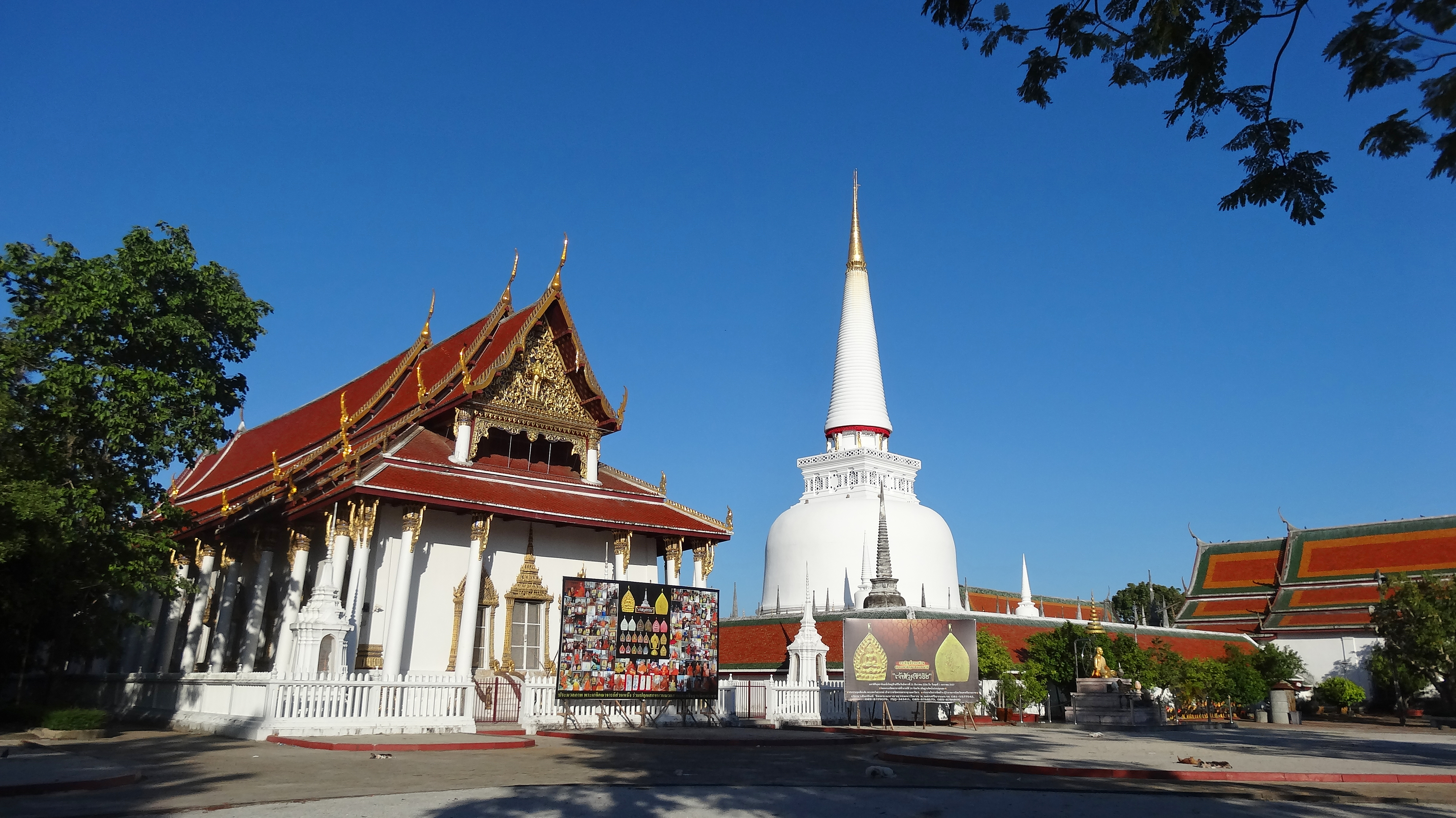
- Wat Phra Mahathat Woramahawihan

- Location within Thailand

Religion
- Affiliation: Buddhism

Location
- Location: Nakhon Si Thammarat
- Country: Thailand
- Coordinates: 8°24′41″N 99°58′00″E

Architecture
- UNESCO World Heritage Site
- Official name: Wat Phra Mahathat Woramahawihan, Nakhon Si Thammarat
- Type: Cultural
- Criteria: ii, vi
- Designated: 2026 (48th session)
- Reference no.: 1761
- Area: 5.356 ha
- Region: Asia and the Pacific

Wat Phra Mahathat Woramahawihan (Thai: วัดพระมหาธาตุวรมหาวิหาร) is the main Buddhist temple (wat) of Nakhon Si Thammarat Province in southern Thailand, a crucial trade crossroad between the Indian and Pacific Oceans. Founded in the 8th century, where a Hindu shrine once stood around 5th–8th centuries, the monastery has been a regional religious centre ever since. The main stupa of the temple, Phra Borommathat Chedi ('great noble relics stupa'), was built by King Sri Dhammasokaraja in the early-13th century to establish a symbol for the Theravada Buddhism sect in the region. The temple houses a relic of Gautama Buddha. The religious and local traditions have continued at the monastery for more than 1,500 years, including the Nakhon Si Thammarat chronicle tradition, the annual cloth-wrapping ceremony for the Great Reliquary and the Menora dance drama.

== History ==
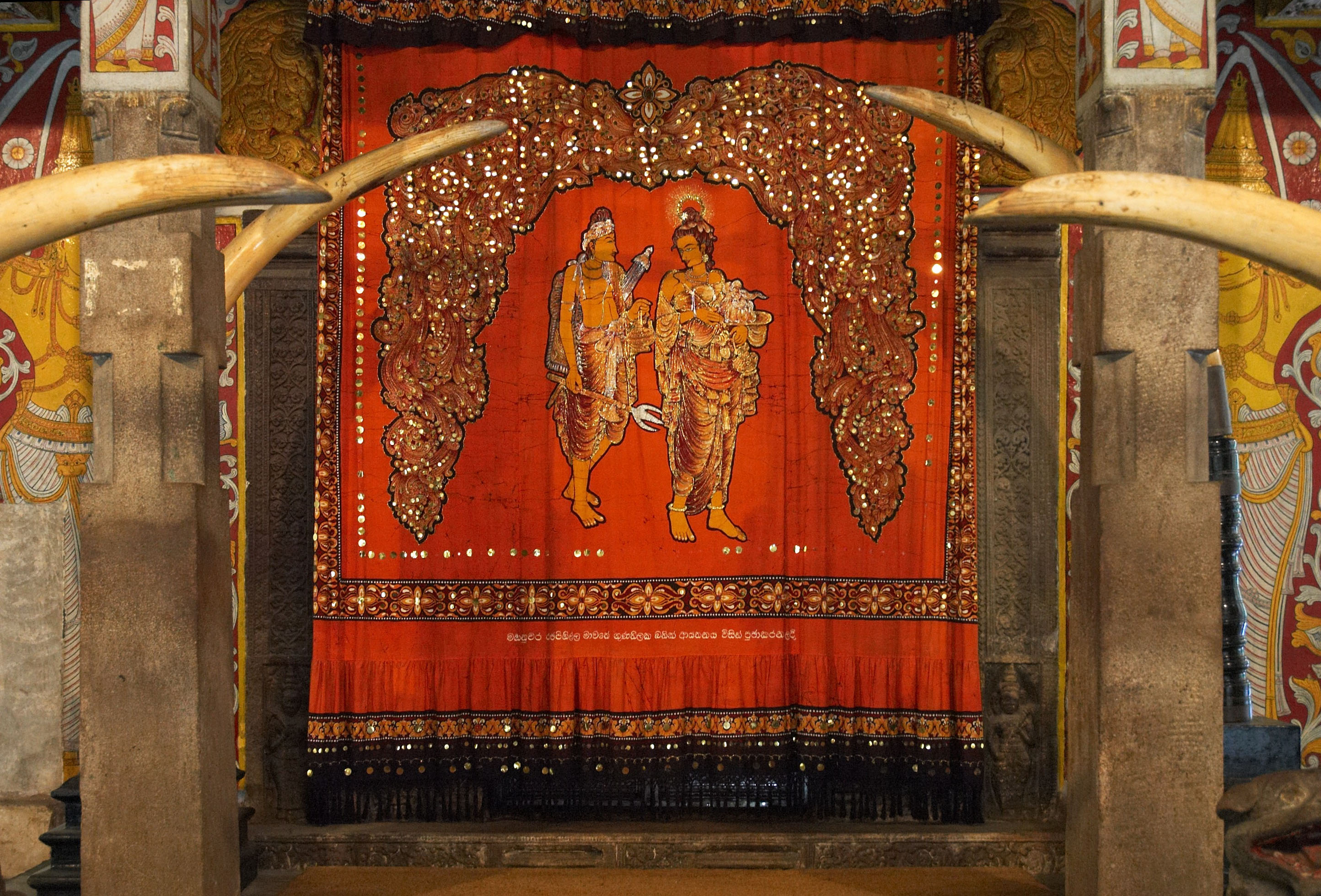
Prince Dantha and Princess Hemamali of Sri Lanka carrying the Sacred Tooth Relic. Decorative mural panel at the Temple of the Tooth, Sri Lanka.

According to the identical Thai and Sri Lankan legend, Prince Thanakuman and Princess Hem Chala brought the relic of Buddha to Hat Sai Kaew and built a small pagoda in 291 CE. When King Si-Thamma Sokarat established the city of Nakhon Si Thammarat, he built a new temple called Wat Phra Borom That on the same site in the Mahayana-style of the ruling Srivijaya Kingdom. The city of Nakhon Si Thammarat was a prominent city in the ancient kingdom of Tambralinga. The city was a part of the Srivijaya empire till the early-13th century.

Historians believe that the city was almost emptied by epidemics and war, prompting the king to build a larger stupa in the Sri Lankan-style with public participation and thereby re-develop the town community. The other religious buildings were constructed between the 13th and 18th centuries including the Wihan-Bodhi Lanka, a roofed cloister around the bodhi tree which is believed to be a sprout of the Mahabodhi tree in the Mahabodhi Temple in Bodh Gaya, India.

The Thai name for the temple, Phra Mahathat Woramahawihan comes from Pali, vara maha dhatu vara maha vihara, literally meaning 'Great Noble Temple of the Great Noble Relics Stupa'. The stupa, which is bell shaped, is inspired from Sri Lankan Buddhist art reflecting the belief of Ashoka's transmission of the tradition of the stupa from India to Sri Lanka. The ruler of Nakhon Si Thammarat, who started work on the stupa called himself Sri Dhammasokaraja, which literally means 'Ashoka the great'. The name of the town Nakhon Si Thammarat, is also derived from Pali, Nagara Sri Dhammaraja, meaning 'town of Dhammaraja'.

The creation of the stupa led to Nakhon Si Thammarat becoming the centre of Theravada Buddhism. Inscriptions from the Sukhothai Kingdom, speak of the influence the city and the stupa had in spreading and strengthening Theravada Buddhism in the kingdom. The temple also received patronage from Ayutthaya Kingdom, which ruled over entire present day Thailand between the 14th and 17th centuries. The stupa and other religious edifices were built over 100 years after construction of the original stupa began. It underwent massive restoration works in 1612–1616, 1647, 1732–1758, 1769, 1895–1898, 1914, 1972–1974, 1987, 1994–1995 and in 2009. The temple was nominated to a tentative list of UNESCO World Heritage Sites list in 2012. On 25 July 2026, it was inscribed on the World Heritage List as Wat Phra Mahathat Woramahawihan, Nakhon Si Thammarat. It is Thailand's first successful cultural World Heritage Site in Southern Thailand.

== Architecture ==
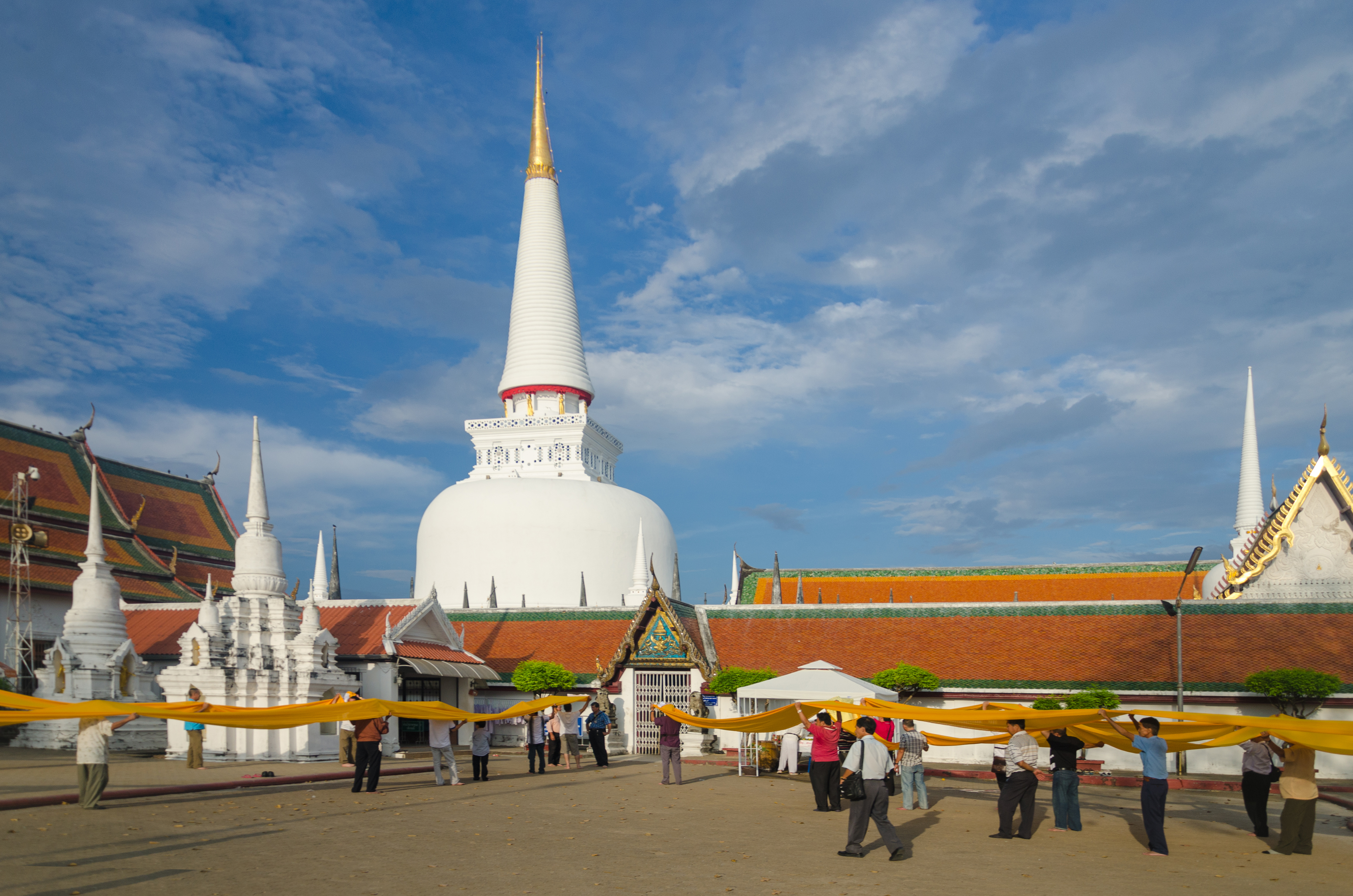
The main stupa

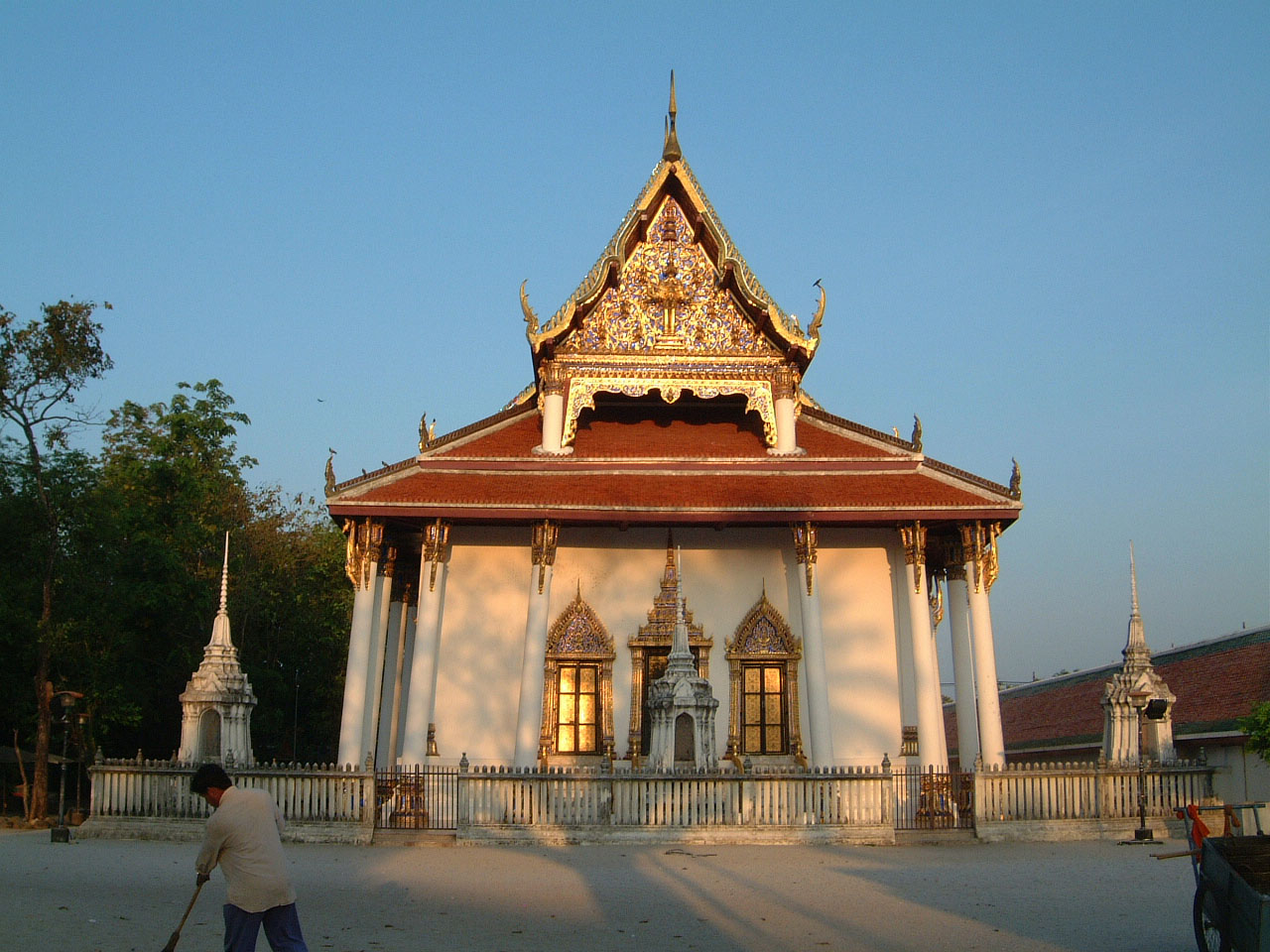
The Sangha-avasa (Wat Phra Baromathat Nakhon)

The principal stupa, Phra Borommathat Chedi, is a bell-shaped stupa built in the early-13th century. The stupa is believed to contain the relics of Gautama Buddha, which marks it as one of the most important sites of Theravada Buddhism. The temple complex is built in a rectangular plan over 5.14 hectares and is enclosed by brick walls. There are four gates for access to the temple. The temple is divided into two zones similar to traditional Buddhist temples: the Buddha-avasa, the sacred area for religious activities and the Sangha-avasa, the residential area for the monks.

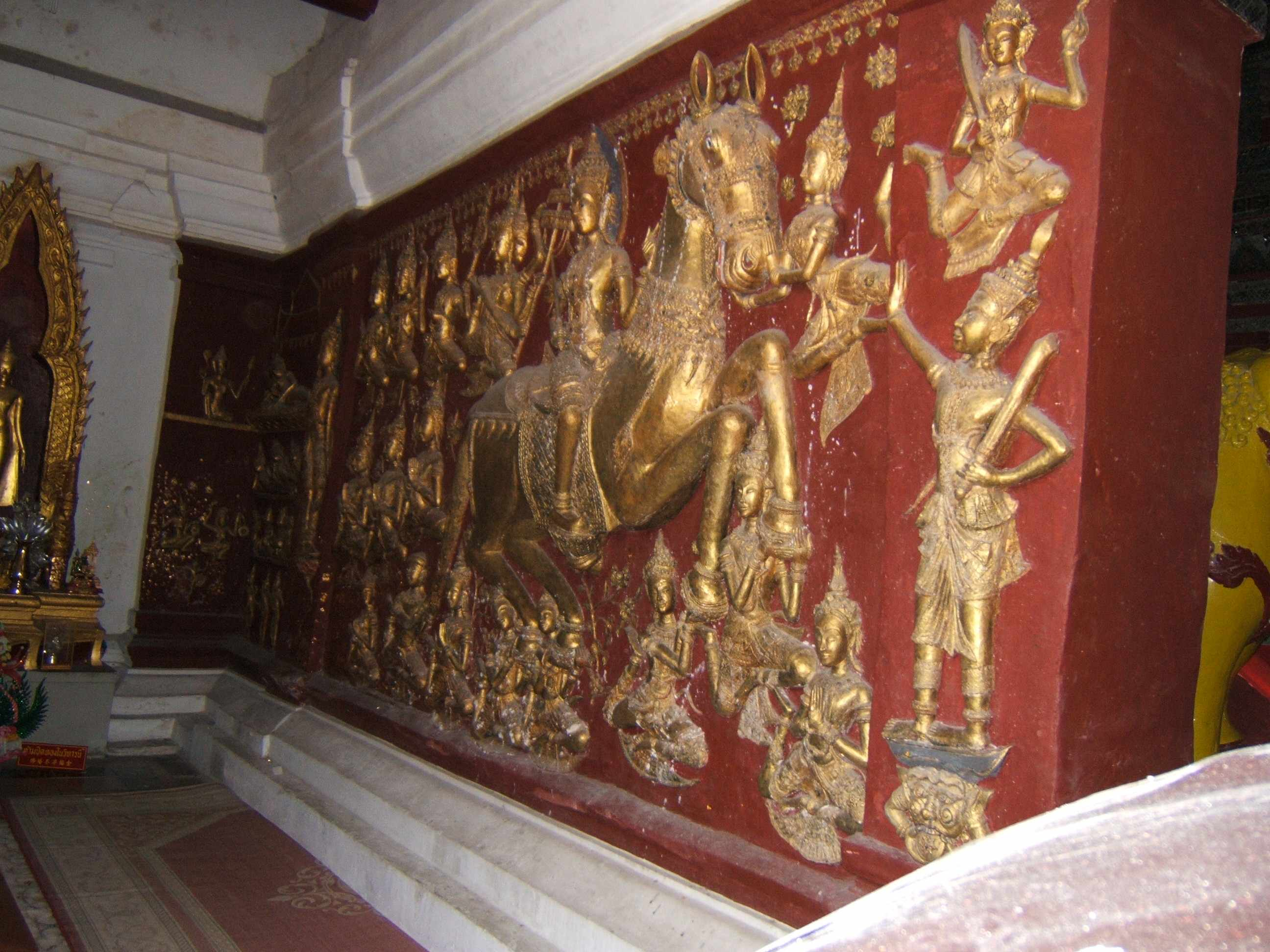
Detailed relief inside the stupa

There are 22 sculpted standing elephants, covered in stucco surrounding the base of the stupa. The base is square with a low brick wall, for providing space for clockwise ambulation around the stupa by believers. There are four bell-shaped stupas surrounding the main stupa. The main stupa has an umbrella like spire formed with 52 rings, which is separated from the bell-shaped stupa by a row of walking Buddha images in relief. The 10.89-metre-high (35.7 ft) spire is covered with gold leaf weighing around 600 kilograms and studded with precious stones.

The principal stupa stands in a cloister covered with coloured tiles. It is surrounded by a gallery lined with numerous Buddha images, the oldest being a Sukhothai-style image of Buddha dating from the 13th–14th century CE. There are also 158 minor chedis (a Thai word for 'stupa') between the main stupa and cloister, housing ashes and bones of Buddhist devotees. The staircase leading to the stupa is guarded by demon giants in the form of yaks. The chapels (Wihan Khian and Wihan Phra Ma) have two stucco reliefs depicting scenes from the life of Buddha on its inner walls. There is a small cloister enclosing the Bodhi tree, outside which is the main assembly hall (Ubosot) called Wihan Luang. The assembly has columns leaning inwards in the Ayyuthaya-style. It was built between the 15th and 16th centuries CE and has a richly decorated ceiling.

There is also a chapel dedicated to Buddha's disciple Kaccayana. The temple complex also has a museum called Wihan Kien containing historical objects, including images of Buddha, auspicious objects and offerings. North of the ubosot is a mondop with a two-tiered roof, containing a Buddha footprint shrine. There are also two bronze statues depicting Tambralingan princes Jatukham and Ramanthep, which according to scholars also represent Hindu gods Kartikeya and Vishnu.

== Culture ==
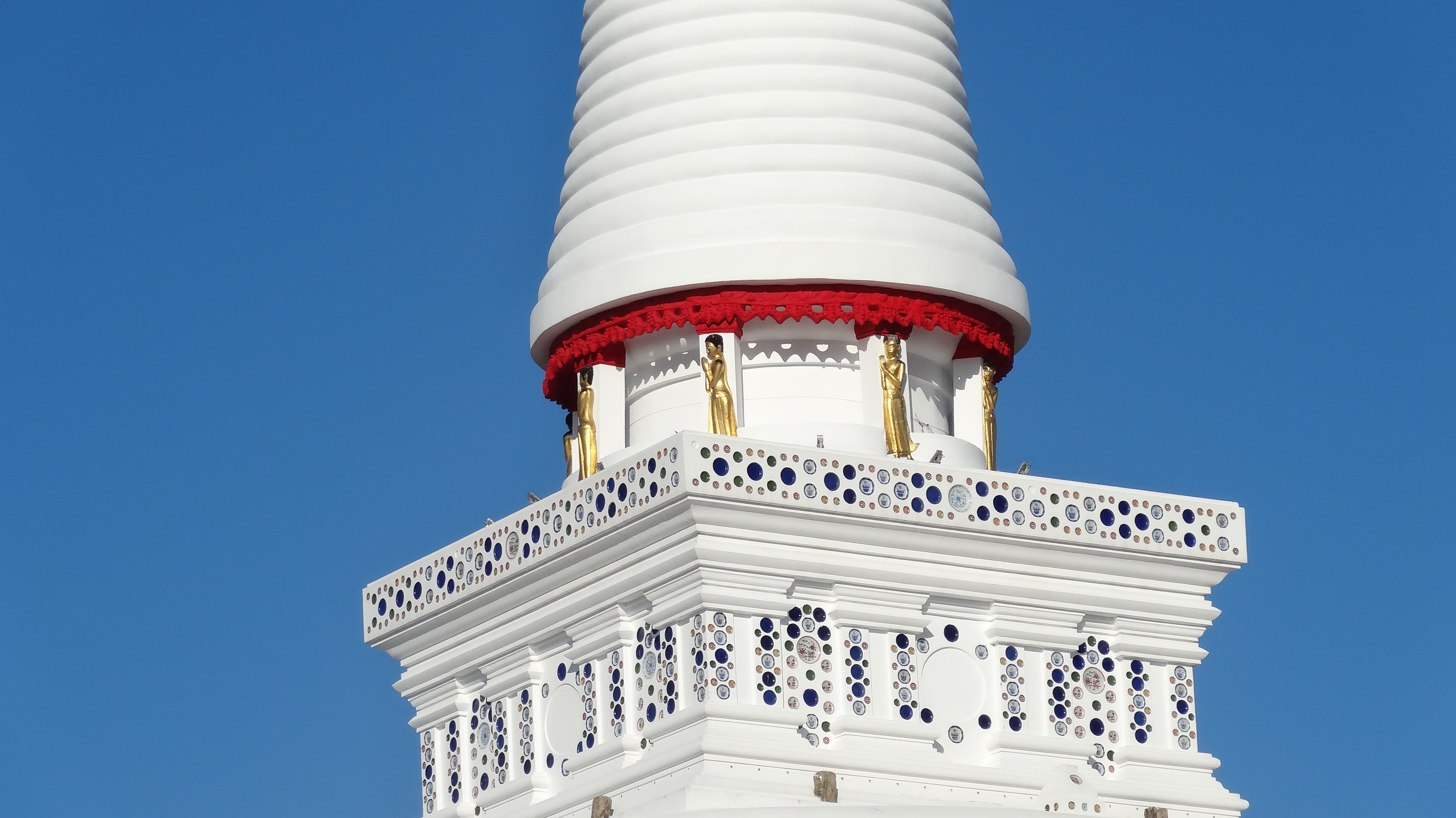
The eight walking Buddhas atop the stupa

The principal stupa was built according to Theravada tradition. The 22 elephants surrounding the base of the stupa symbolise the 22 spiritual faculties (Indriya). The 52 rings on the spire represent the 52 mental factors (Cetasika). The eight statues of walking Buddha denote the Noble Eightfold Path leading to cessation of suffering leading to Arhatship, which is the highest doctrine of Buddhism. The relative size of the height and width of the principal bell-shaped stupa is 2:1 implying the complete integrity of corporeal and spiritual aspects. The height of the stupa is 28 wa and its width is 14 wa. The height of the stupa therefore represents the 28 corporeality aspects and the width represents the 14 functions of consciousness. The height of the entire stupa structure including the spire and the base is 78 metres.

The obverse of the 25 satang coin features an image of the Wat Phra Mahathat Woramahawihan. It is also a symbol of Nakhon Si Thammarat Province. Jatukam Ramathep amulets, consecrated in the temple are believed to act as lucky charms, drawing visitors from across the nation.

== Hae Pha Khuen That ==
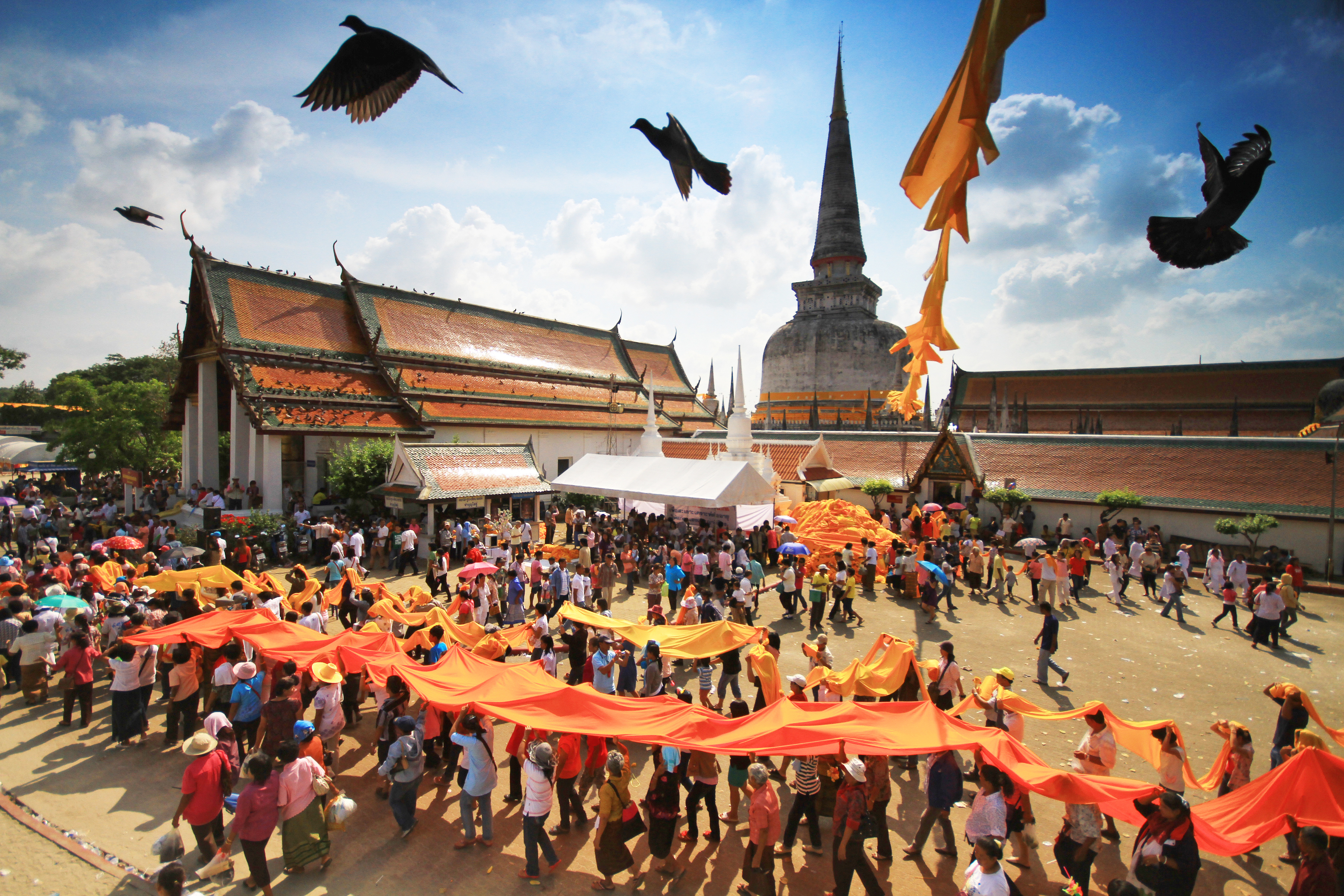
A procession during Hae Pha Khuen That

Hae Pha Khuen That (Thai: แห่ผ้าขึ้นธาตุ, lit. 'process cloth to the stupa') is the annual temple festival held on the occasion of Magha Puja, which is celebrated on the full moon day in February. The celebrations are marked by a procession with a robe, known as Phra Bot, joined in a single piece to wrap around the bell shaped body of the main stupa and the chedis. Traditionally white robes painted with scenes from the life of Buddha are used, but sometimes plain white, red, or yellow robes are also used. The festival is believed to have started in 1230 when the main stupa was completed.

== Gallery ==
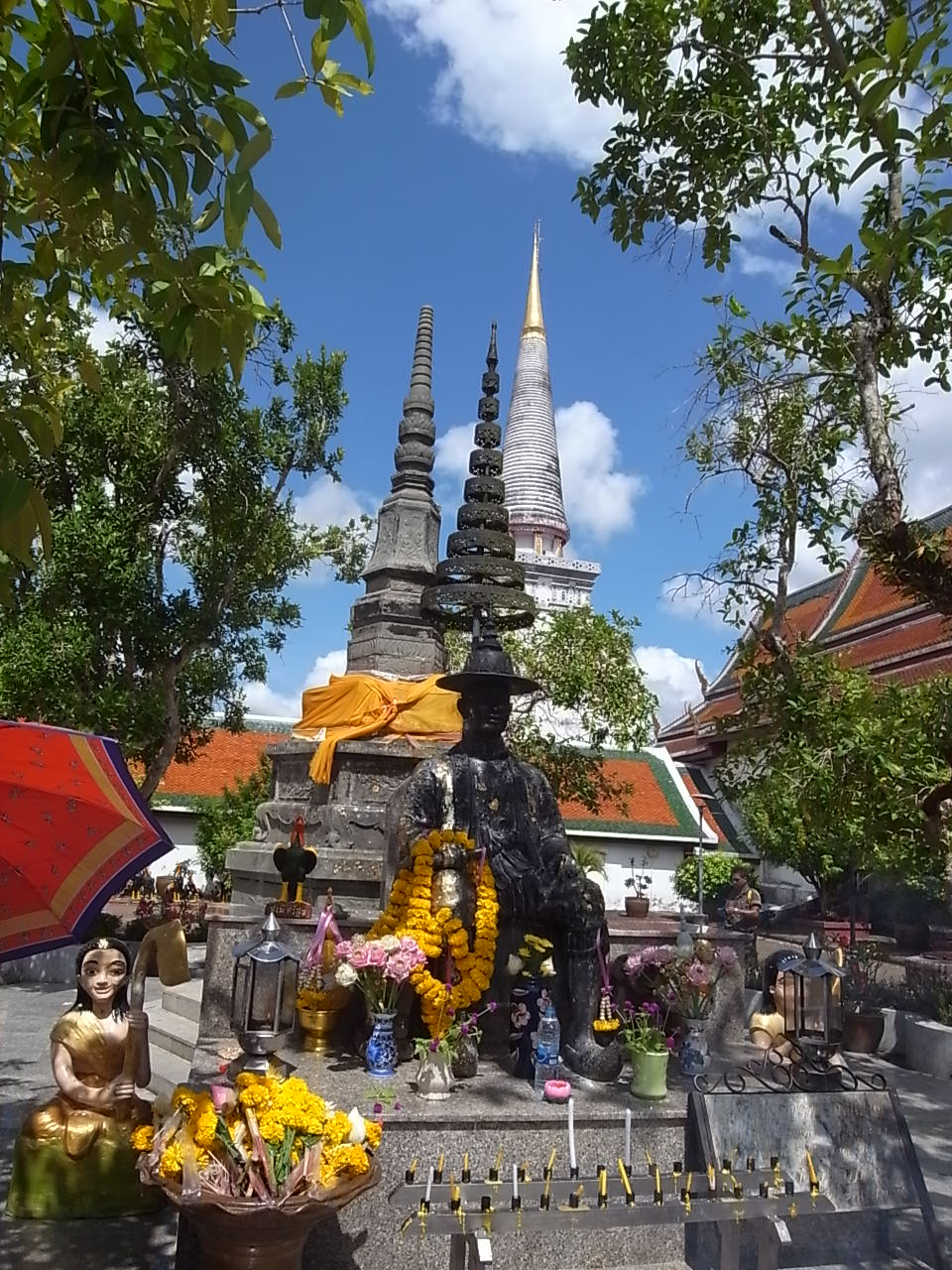
Statue of King Taksin at the temple

Seal of Nakhon Si Thammarat Province

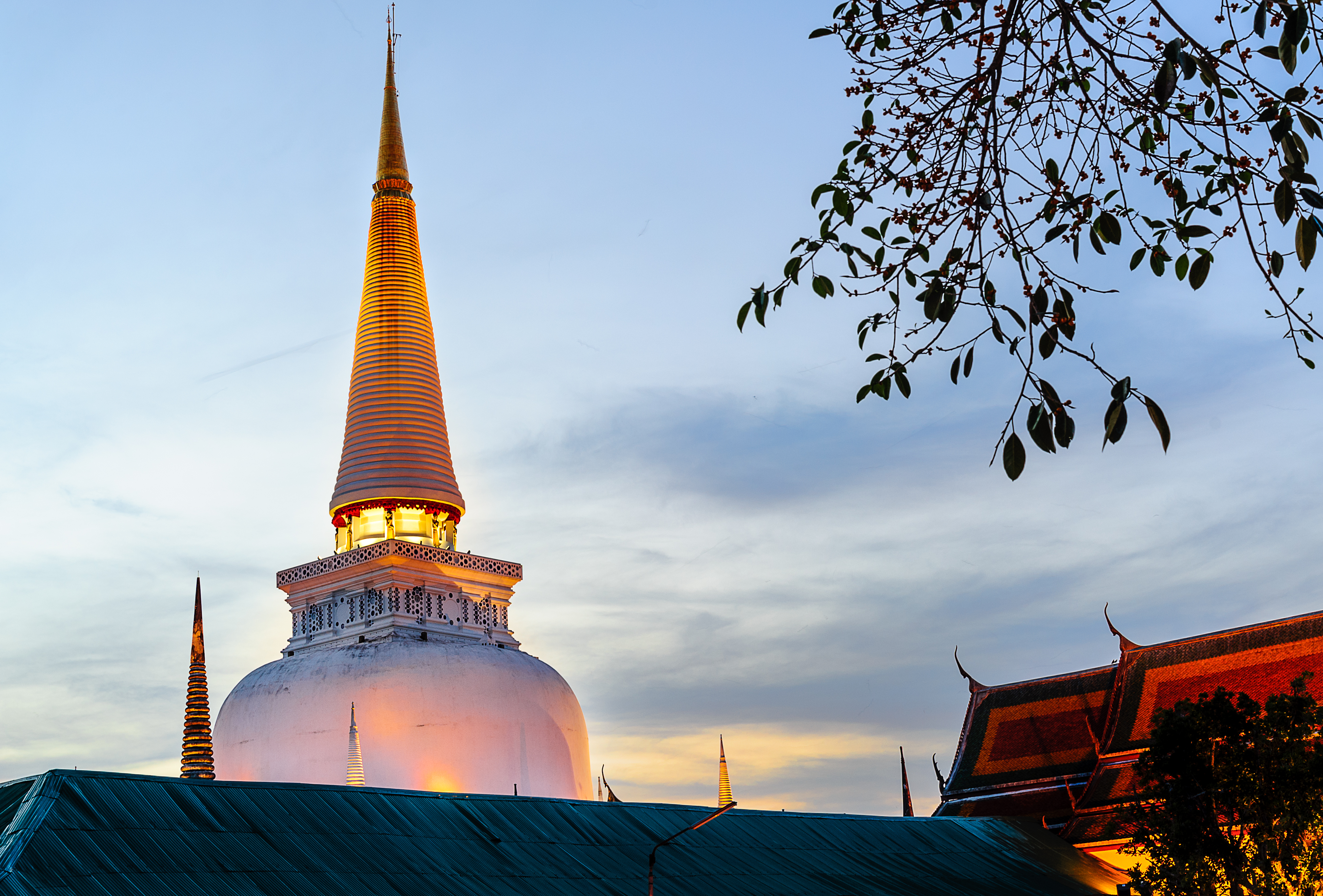
A closer view of the spire

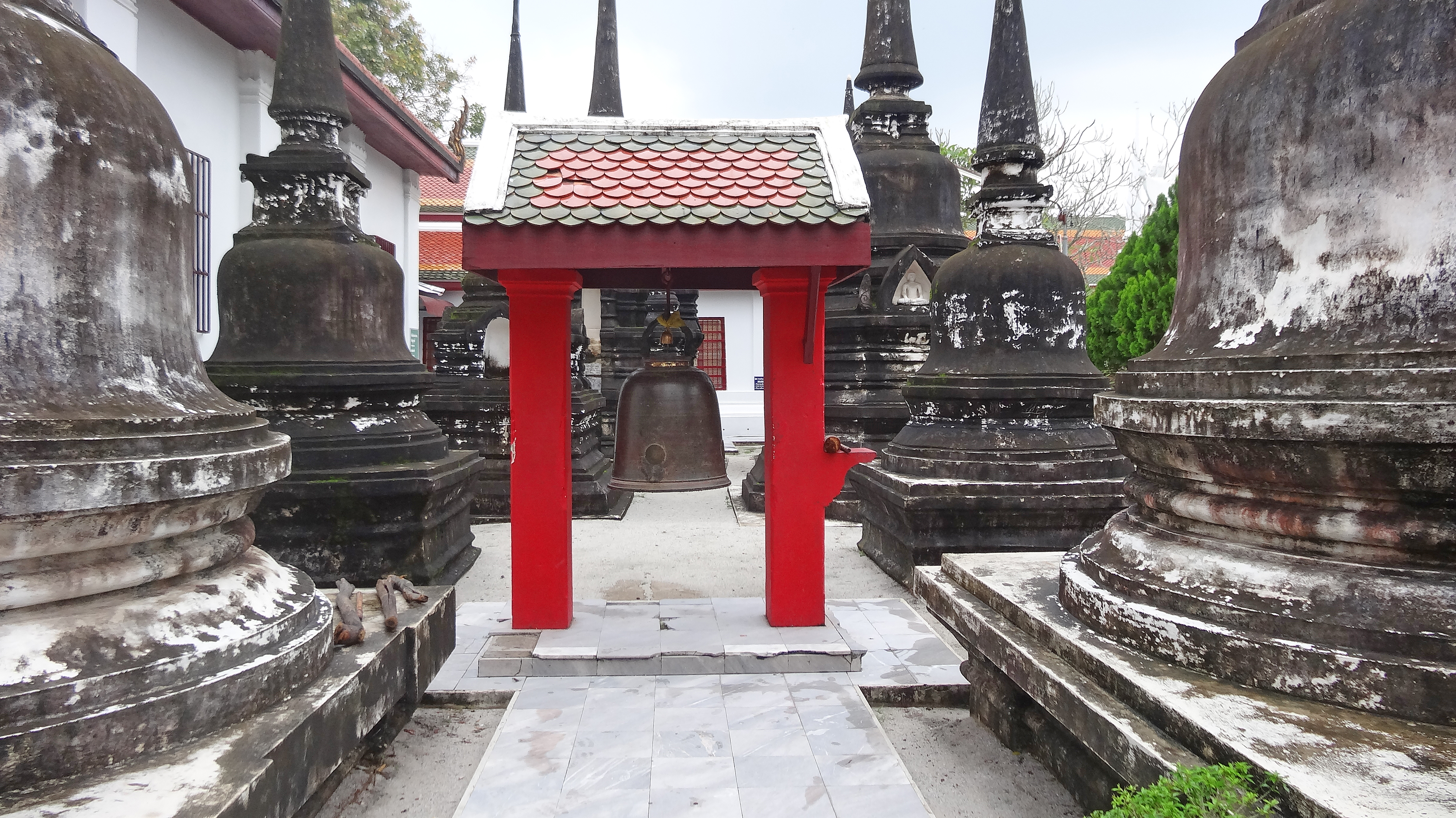
The minor chedis inside the temple

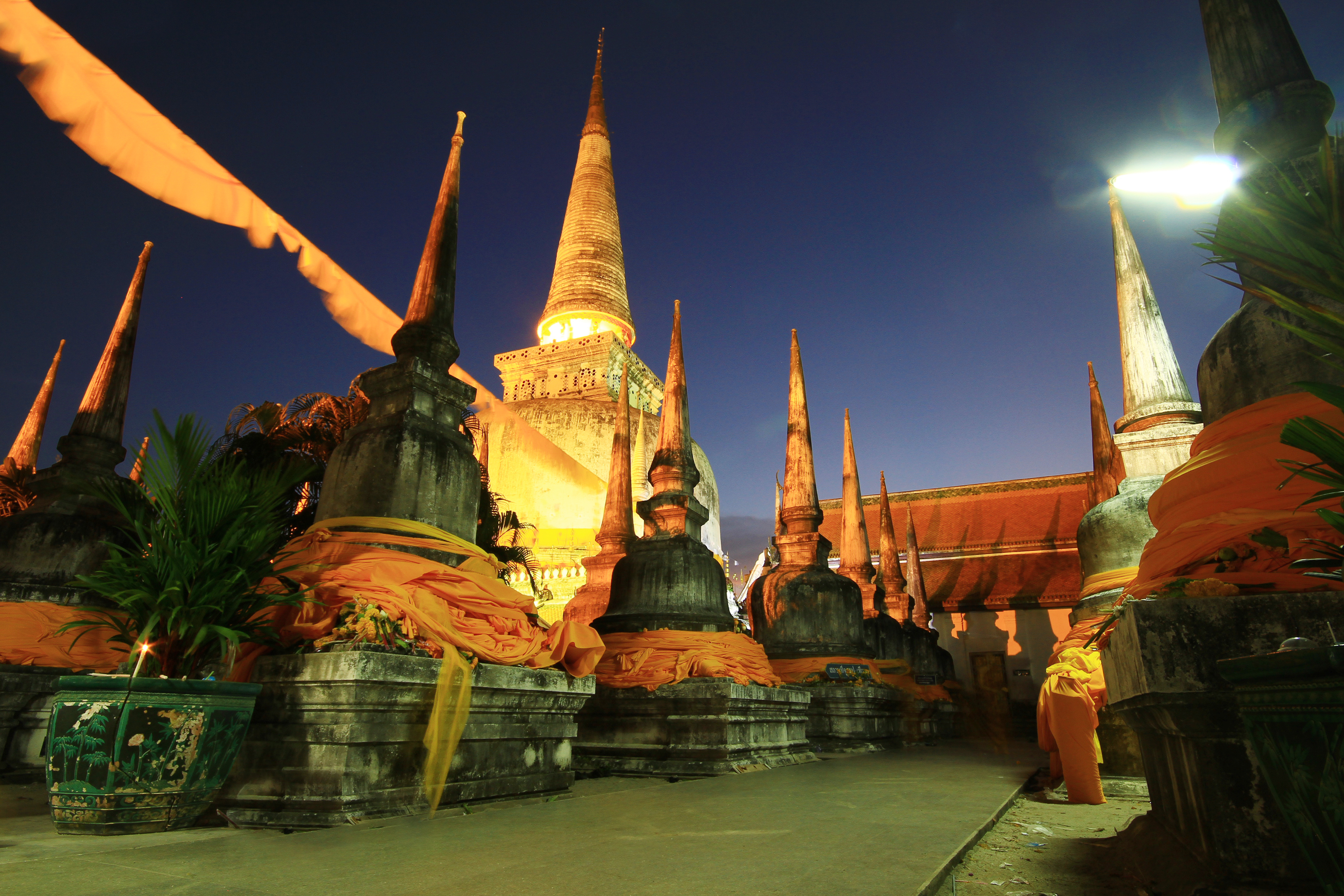
The minor chedis after Hae Pha Khuen That

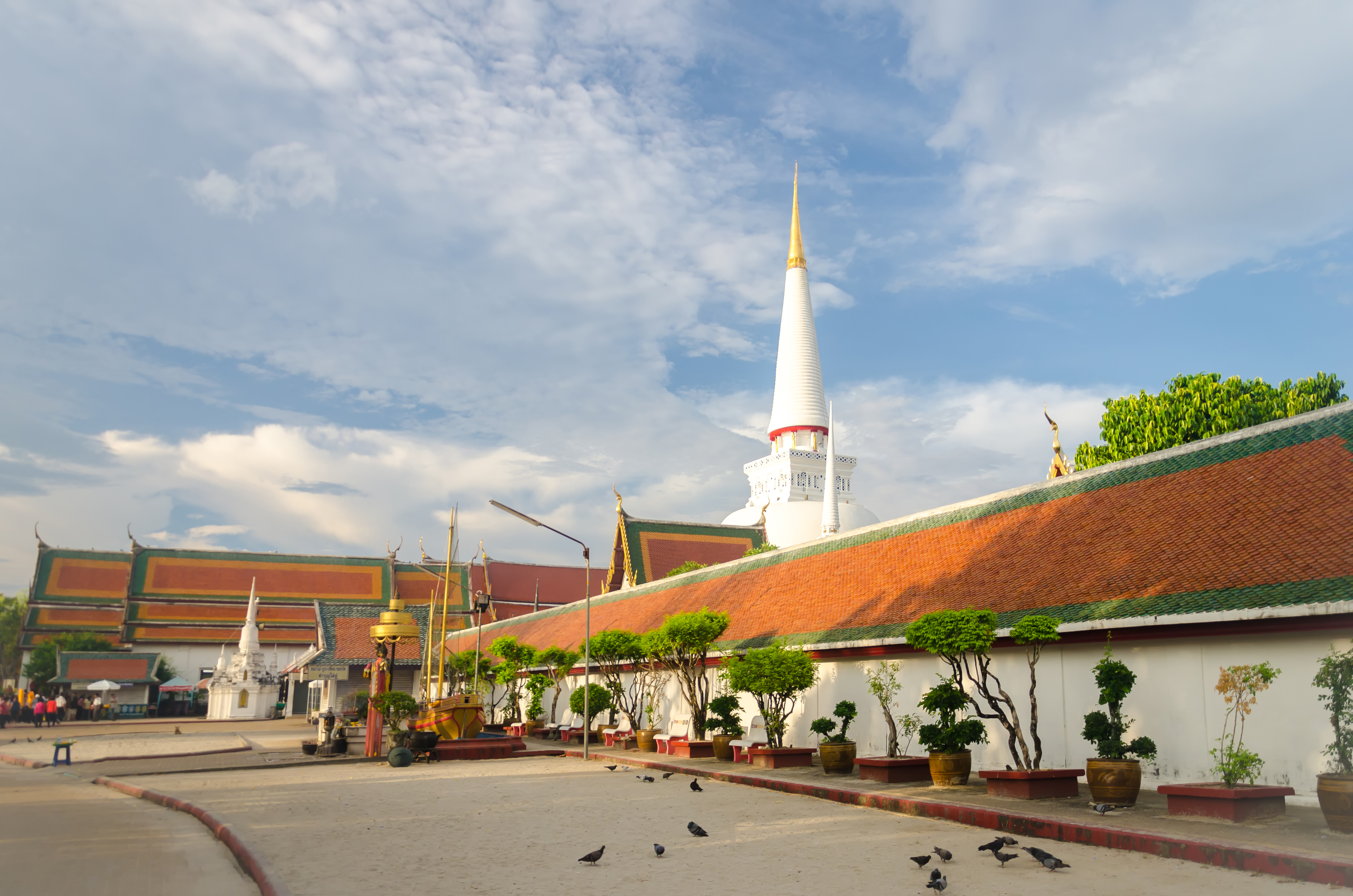
The wall around the temple

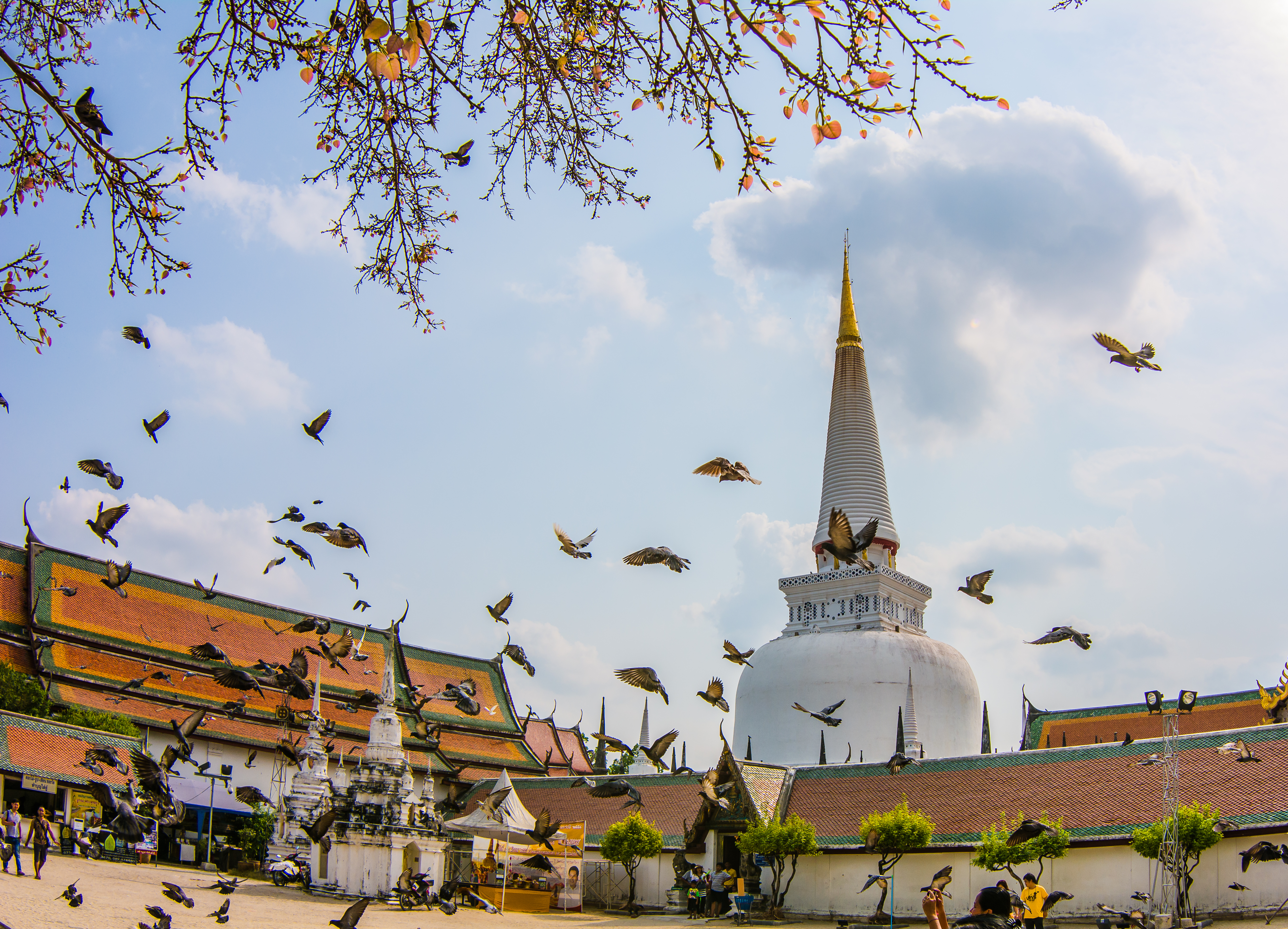
Market at the south of the ubosot

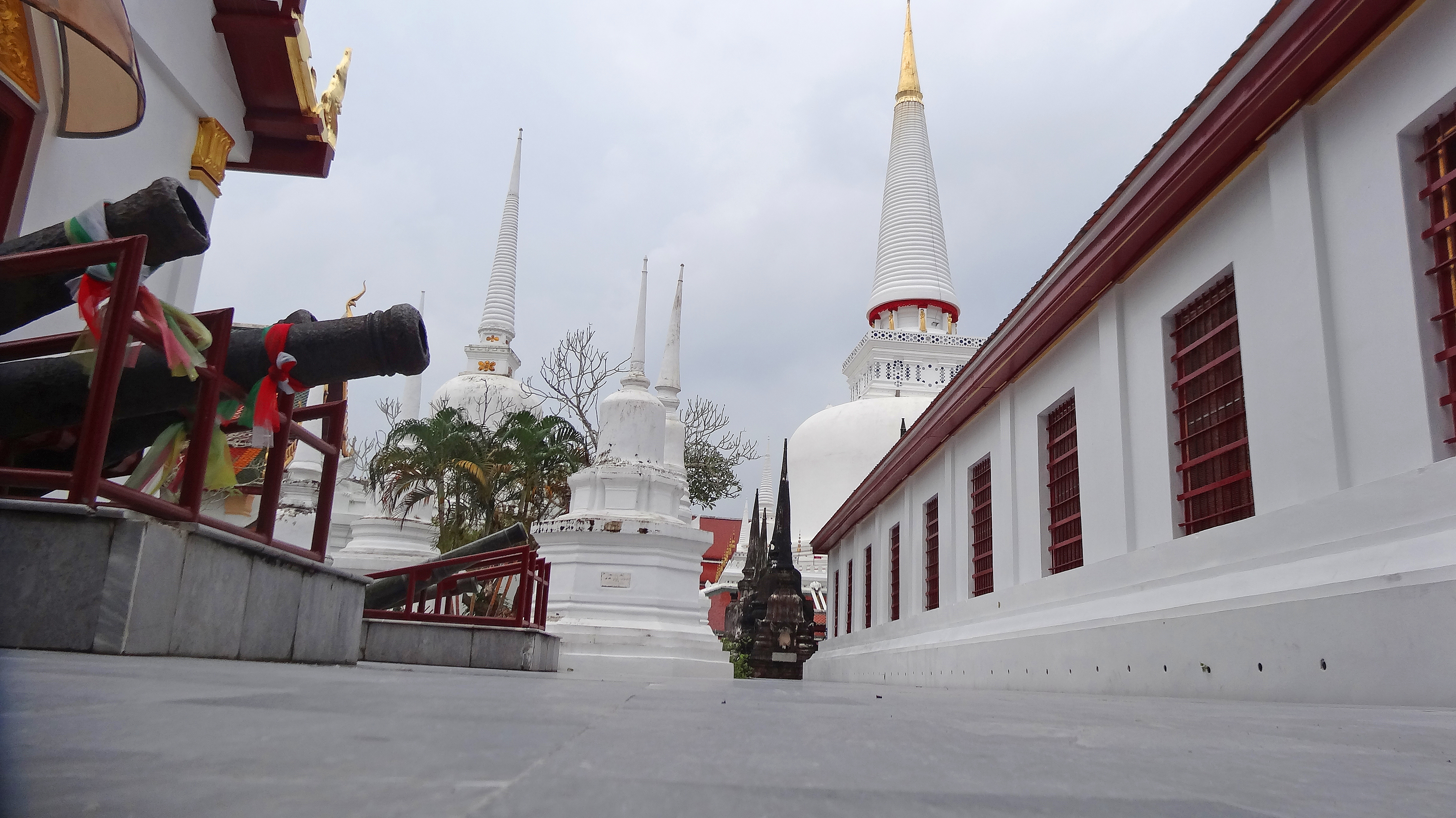
The pathway around the stupa

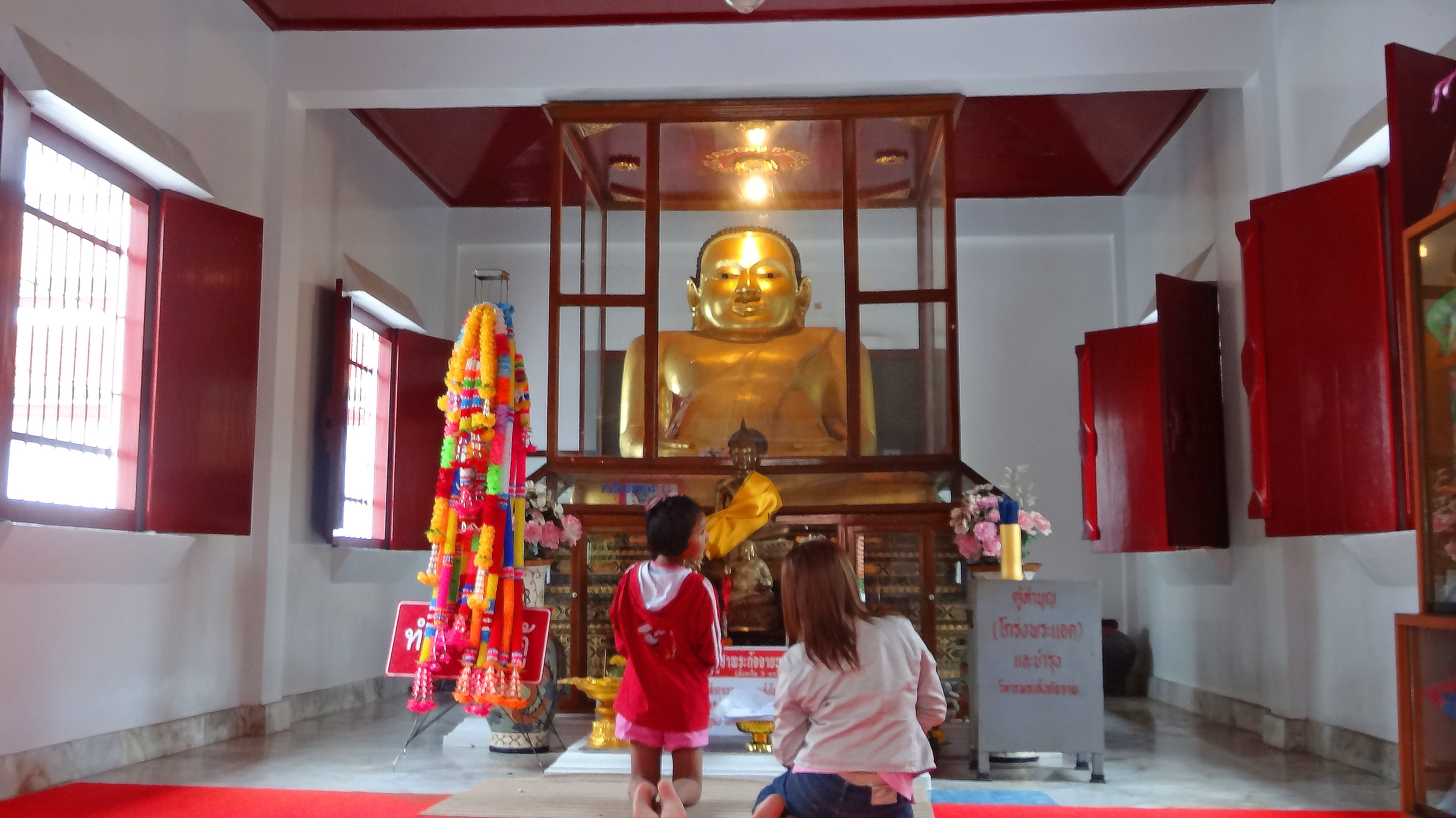
Statue inside the temple

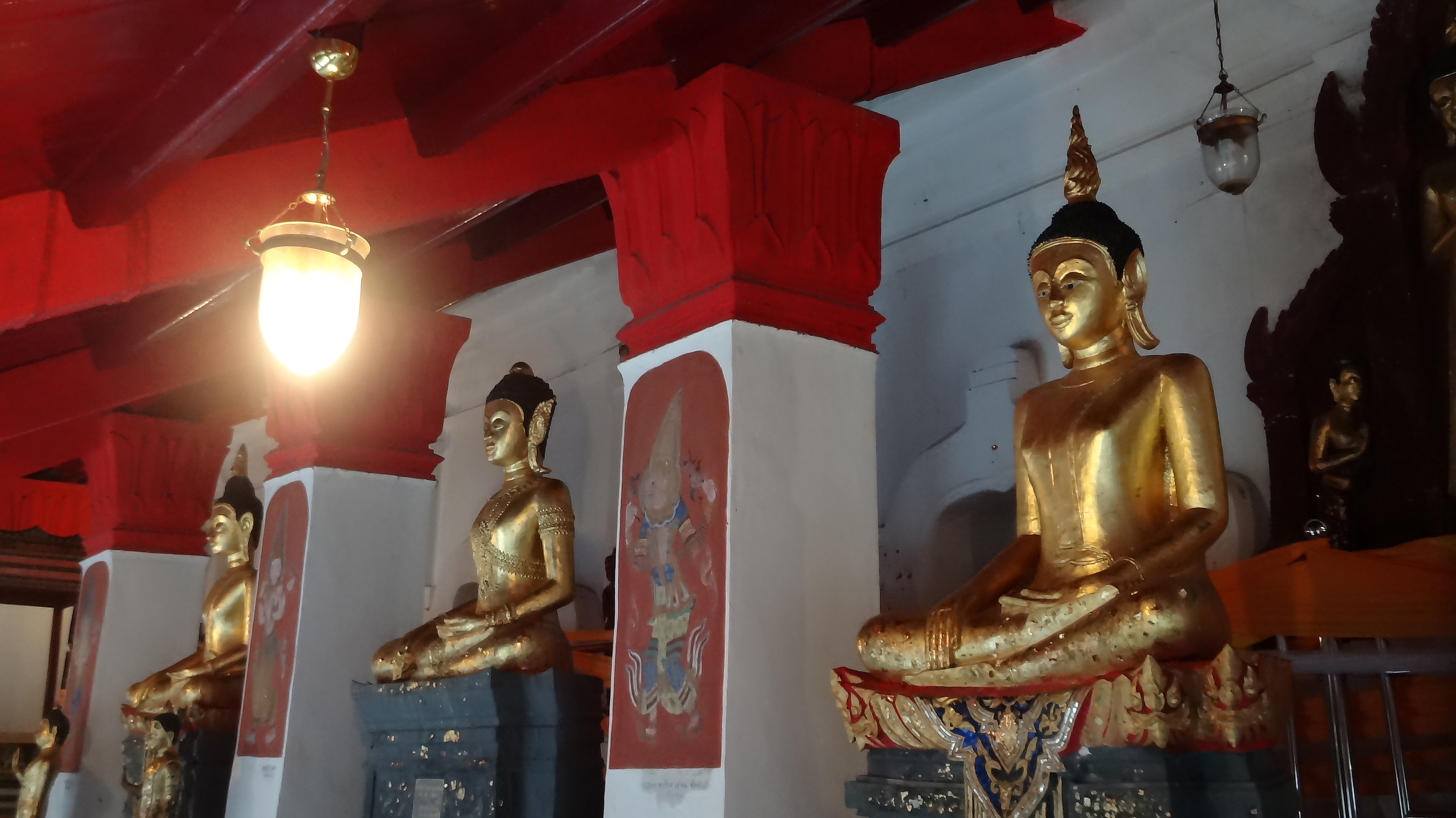
Seated Buddhas in the base of the stupa

== See also ==
- Architecture of Thailand
- Buddhist architecture
- Buddhism in Southeast Asia
- Buddhism in Thailand
- History of Thailand
- List of Buddhist temples in Thailand
- List of World Heritage Sites in Thailand
