= Sichon district =

Sichon สิชล
- District
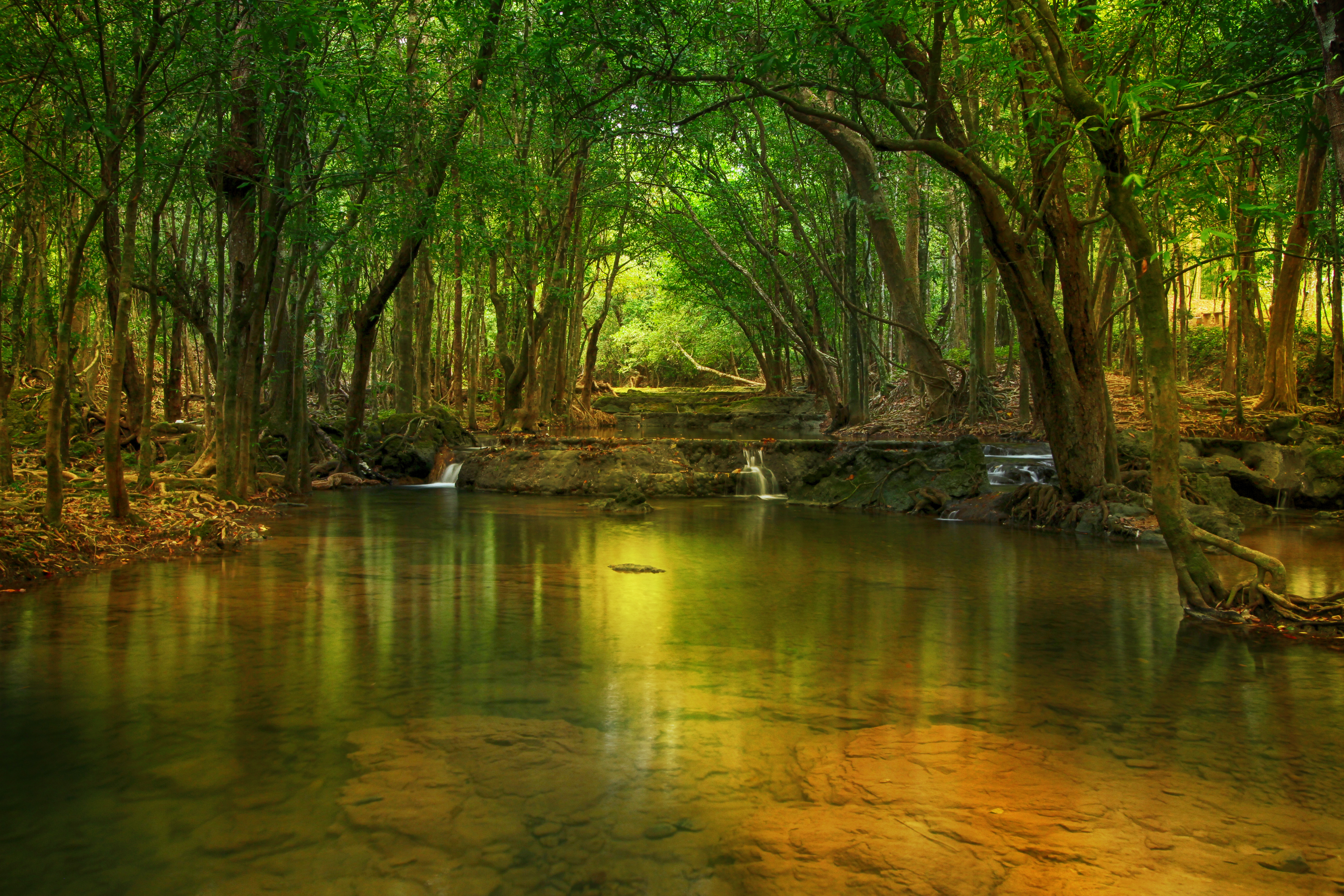
- Namtok Si Khit National Park

- District location in Nakhon Si Thammarat province
- Coordinates: 9°0′24″N 99°54′6″E
- Country: Thailand
- Province: Nakhon Si Thammarat
- Seat: Thung Prang

Area
  - Total: 703.1 km^{2} (271.5 sq mi)

Population (2026)
  - Total: 82,562
  - Density: 119.4/km^{2} (309/sq mi)
- Time zone: UTC+7 (ICT)
- Postal code: 80120
- Geocode: 8014

Sichon (Thai: สิชล, pronounced [sìʔ.t͡ɕʰōn]) is a district (amphoe) of Nakhon Si Thammarat province, southern Thailand.

== Geography ==
The district is in the northern part of the province. Neighboring districts are (from the south clockwise): Tha Sala and Nopphitam of Nakhon Si Thammarat Province; Kanchanadit and Don Sak of Surat Thani province; Khanom of Nakhon Si Thammarat. To the east is the Gulf of Thailand.

Namtok Si Khit National Park is in the district.

== Etymology ==
The name Sichon (Thai: สิชล) means “good water,” according to the Nakhon Si Thammarat Chronicle. Historically, Sichon was a coastal area where Chinese junks stopped to anchor and unload goods, which were then transported inland for sale and onward to Nakhon Si Thammarat. The Chinese sailors referred to the area as Thi Chon (Thai: ที่ชล), meaning the coast, and that the name gradually became known among local residents as Sichon.

The name also appeared as Suchon (Thai: สุชล) in a royal announcement concerning the Traditional Thai New Year ceremony during the reign of King Mongkut (Rama IV), and as Sichon (Thai: สีชล) during the reign of King Chulalongkorn (Rama V), and King Vajiravudh (Rama VI). During Ayutthaya period, the area was referred to by different names, including Trachon (Thai: ตระชน) and Srichon (Thai: ศรีชน).

== Administration ==
The district is divided into nine sub-districts (tambons), which are further subdivided into 106 villages (mubans). Sichon itself has township (thesaban tambon) status and covers part of tambon Khanom. There are a further nine tambon administrative organizations.

Sichon District had a total registered population of 82,562 in 2026. The most populous sub-district is Sao Phao (population: 12,038), while the least populous is Khao Noi (population: 5,682).

No.	Name	Thai name	Villages	Pop.
1.	Sichon	สิชล	10	9,709
2.	Thung Prang	ทุ่งปรัง	16	11,295
3.	Chalong	ฉลอง	10	6,570
4.	Sao Phao	เสาเภา	16	12,038
5.	Plian	เปลี่ยน	14	7,644
6.	Si Khit	สี่ขีด	12	10,078
7.	Theppharat	เทพราช	13	8,092
8.	Khao Noi	เขาน้อย	7	5,682
9.	Thung Sai	ทุ่งใส	8	11,454

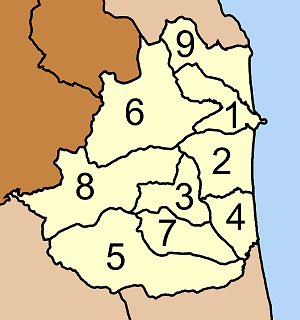

== Tourism ==
- Namtok Si Khit (อุทยานแห่งชาติน้ำตกสี่ขีด): a small waterfall in Namtok Si Khit National Park on top of a mountain 1,303 m (4,274.9 ft) above sea level, covered with various types of rainforests, including a very rich ecosystem.
- Wat Chedi Ai Khai วัดเจดีย์(ไอ้ไข่): an ancient Buddhist temple more than 1,000 years old in Chalong Subdistrict, this religious temple is famous for "I Khai" (ไอ้ไข่), a wood carving in the shape of a child, aged about 9–10 years old. He is believed to be a local boy who drowned in the temple area and became a Kuman Thong. Each day, many people pay obeisance to him to ask for fortune. Vows are often made to offer cock fighting figures or firecrackers.
- Khao Ka Ancient Ruins (โบราณสถานเขาคา) is an ancient monument in Sao Phao Subdistrict. This site is over 1,500 years old, it was an important religious center of the Shaivism, which worshipped Shiva (also known as Ishvara) as the supreme deity. Khao Ka is considered a representation of Mount Meru, the center of the universe, with smaller ancient structures scattered around it. Archaeological discoveries in the area include ritual artifacts such as Yoni bases (foundations for Shiva Lingam), Shiva Lingam, Soma sutra conduits (sacred water channels), as well as remnants of ancient shrines and reservoirs. The Fine Arts Department of Thailand completed restoration work on the site in 1997 (B.E. 2540).
- Thuad Suk Cave (ถ้ำทวดสุข) is located at Ban Na Khud, Thung Prang Subdistrict. It is a cave where villagers in the Ayutthaya period used to store Buddha statues to protect them from the threat of the Burmese–Siamese War.
- Khao Plai Dam (เขาพลายดำ) is a mountain next to the sea bounded to Khanom and Sichon. At present, it is where the site of the Wildlife Sanctuary is located. Located in Tambon Thung Sai. There are many beautiful beaches and attractions. In addition, it is a mountain near the sea, Khanom and Sichon. It is also the site of the development of wildlife. It is characterized by beautiful beaches and you can also go swimming in the Tung Yang Beach. Khao Phlai Dam also has a variety of wildlife species such as deer and birds.
- Tewada Local Market (ตลาดเทวดา) is a bustling marketplace known for fresh seafood, tropical fruits, and traditional Thai delicacies. It is a popular spot for both locals and tourists. Situated in the heart of Sichon town, the market operates daily with peak hours in the early morning and late afternoon.
- Wat Suchon (วัดสุชน)is a Theravada Buddhist temple of the Mahayana sect, located in Sichon Subdistrict, Sichon District. Historically, the temple was a battlefield during King Taksin's campaign against Phraya Nakhon's faction in 1769. The temple was officially established in 1885 and received its consecrated boundary (Wisungkhamsima) on February 28, 2020. Inside the ordination hall, the main Buddha statue, "Somdej Phra Phuttha Chayantee Si Suchon", is enshrined, featuring a mix of four artistic styles: Chiang Saen, Sukhothai, Srivijaya, and Indian. The temple is also home to a revered statue of Tao Wessuwan, associated with financial prosperity and commonly worshipped for wealth and fortune, especially by those born on a Tuesday.
- Wat Boek (วัดเบิก) is an unseen temple that is presumed to have been built during the early Rattanakosin period. Evidence of the temple's name, Wat Boek, appears in official records of government officials in Nakhon Si Thammarat.
- Hin Ngam Beach (หาดหินงาม) is a beach full of circle stones which have pretty color and are the origin of its name. There are no facilities along the beach.
- Sichon Beach (หาดสิชล) or as the villagers call it Hua Hin Sichon has been a famous tourist attraction for a long time. The beach is a rock formation suitable for swimming. There are also hotels and resorts, seafood restaurants, and stylishly decorated cafes.
