= Nakhon Si Thammarat province =

Nakhon Si Thammarat นครศรีธรรมราช
- Province
- Nakhon Si Thammarat province

Other transcription(s)
  - Malay: Ligor (Rumi)
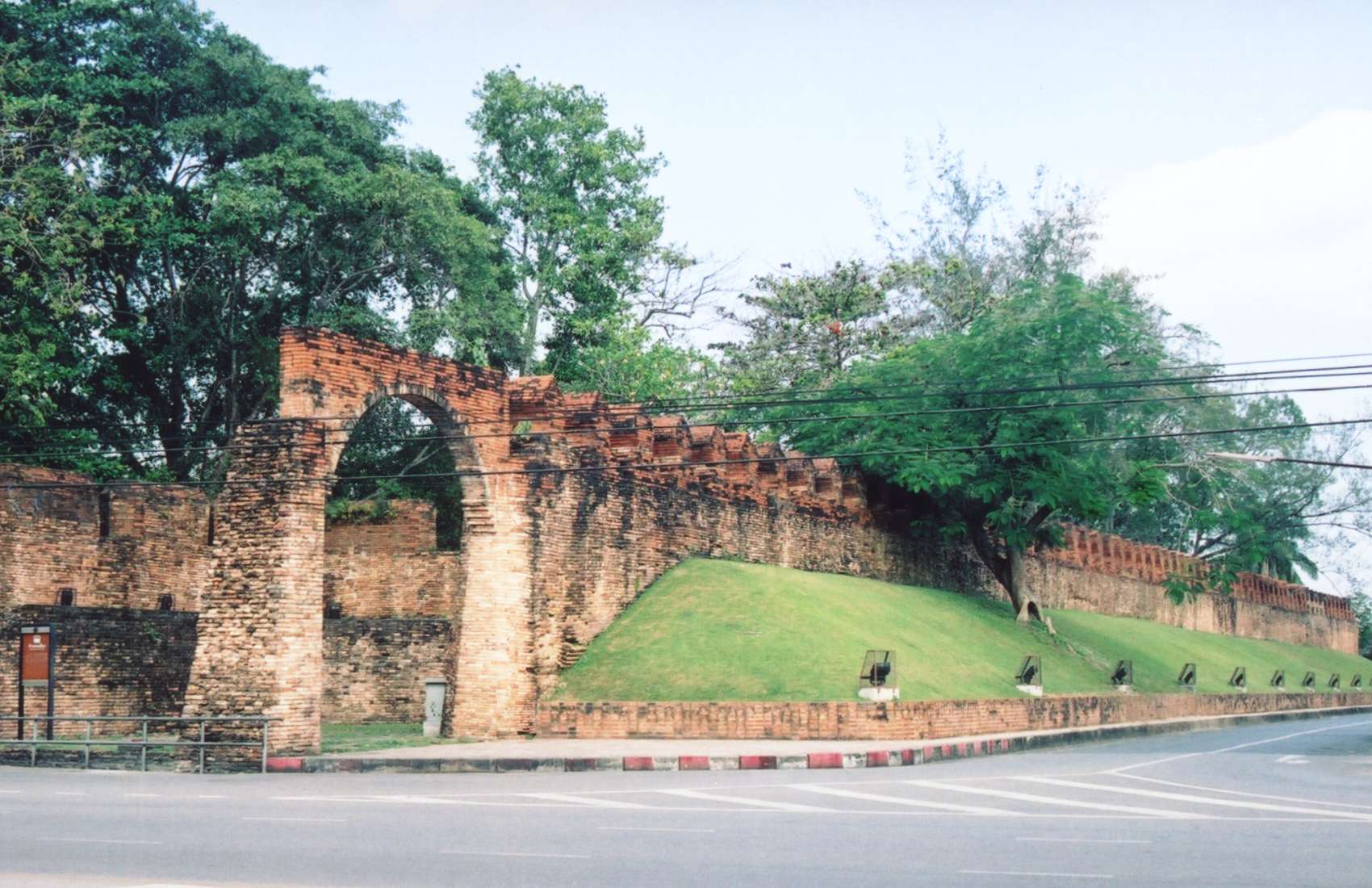
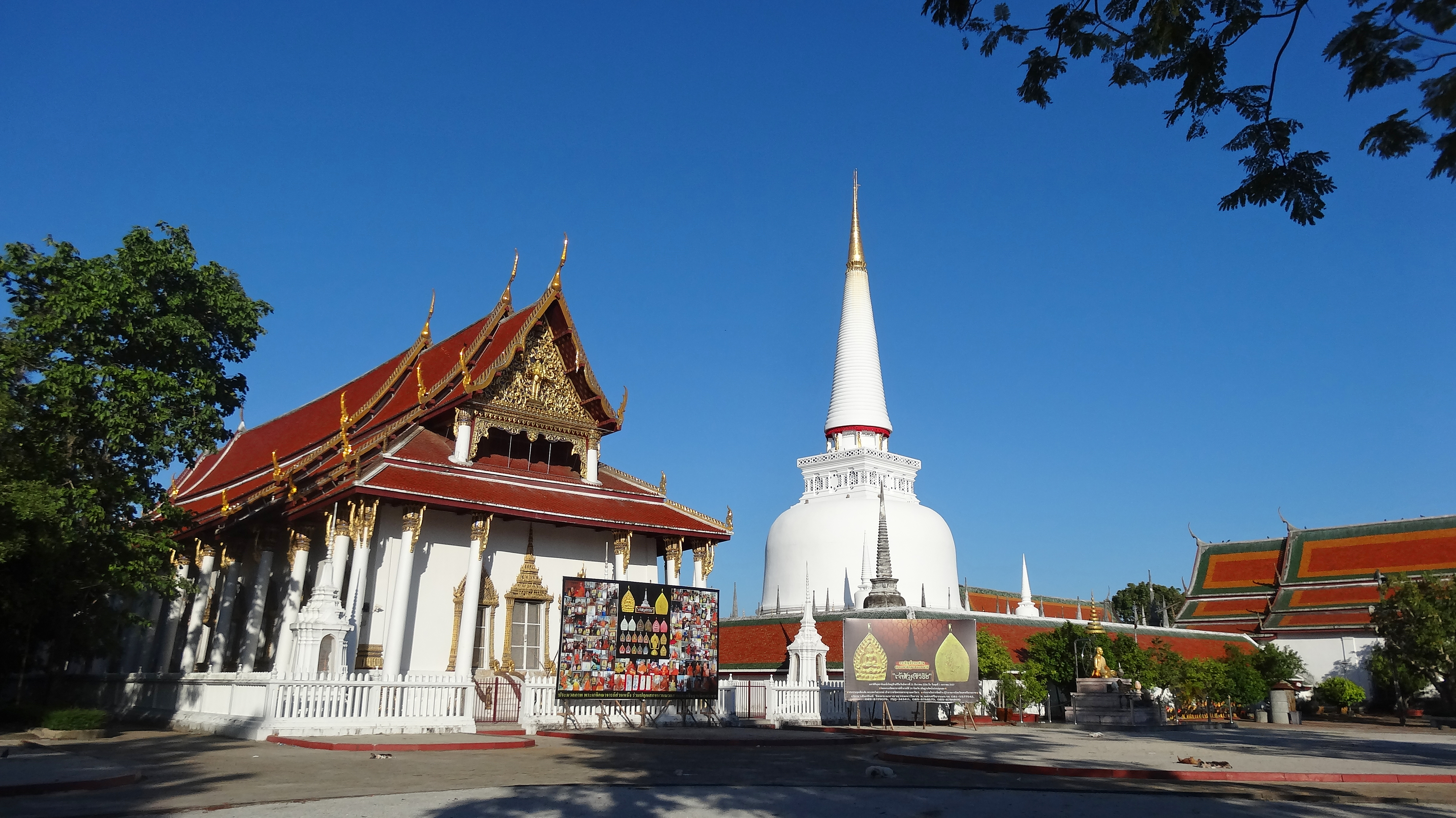
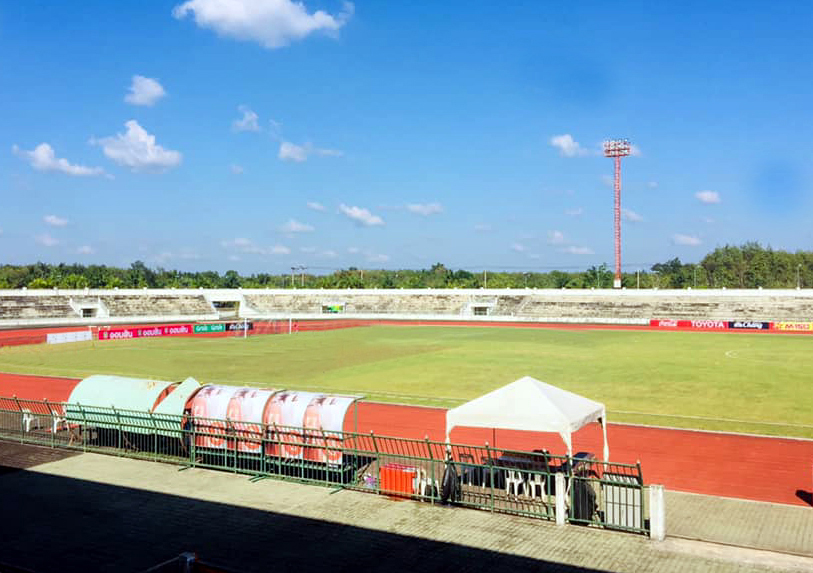
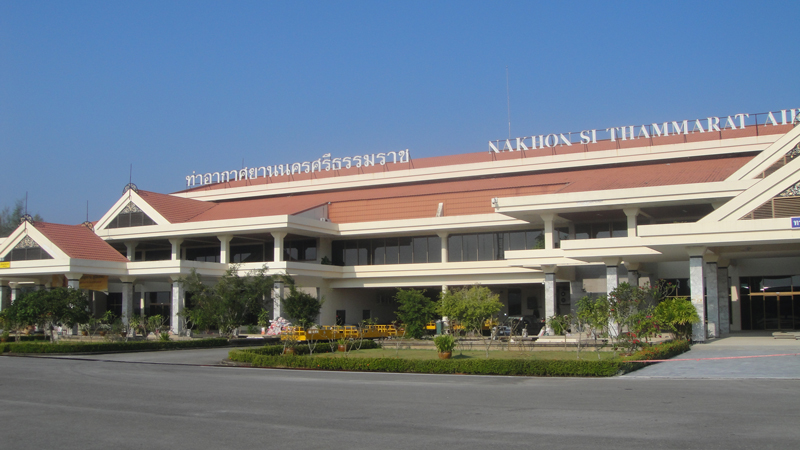
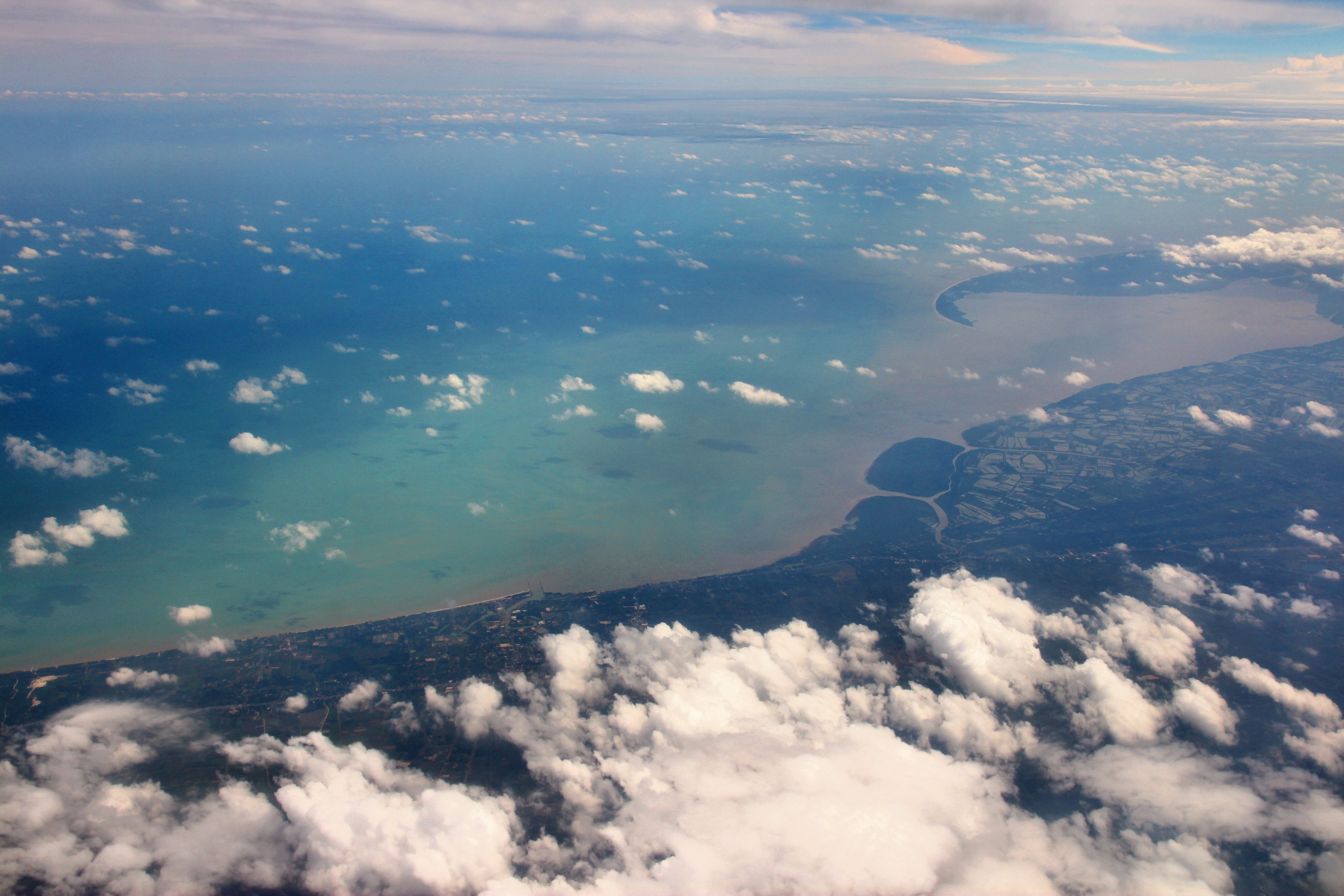
- From left to right, top to bottom : Nakhon Si Thammarat City Wall, Wat Phra Mahathat, Nakhon Si Thammarat PAO Stadium, Nakhon Si Thammarat Airport, Aerial view of Talumphuk Cape and Gulf of Thailand

- Flag Seal
- Nicknames: Muangkon (Thai: เมืองคอน) (or just simply "kon" (Thai : คอน)); Nakhon (Thai: นคร)
- Mottoes: เราชาวนครฯ อยู่เมืองพระ มั่นอยู่ในสัจจะศีลธรรม กอปรกรรมดี มีมานะพากเพียร ไม่เบียดเบียนทำอันตรายผู้ใด ("We the Nakhon people's, the city of Buddhism. Strong in moral truth, good karma and perseverance. Never encroach nor harm anyone")
- Map of Thailand highlighting Nakhon Si Thammarat province
- Coordinates: 8°25′7″N 99°57′49″E
- Country: Thailand
- Capital: Nakhon Si Thammarat

Government
  - Type: Province and Provincial Administrative Organization
  - Body: Nakhon Si Thammarat Province and Nakhon Si Thammarat Provincial Administrative Organization
  - Governor: Somchai Leelanoi
  - PAO Chief Executive: Warin Chinwong

Area
  - Total: 9,885 km^{2} (3,817 sq mi)
  - Rank: 18th

Population (2024)
  - Total: ▼1,534,653
  - Rank: 9th
  - Density: 155/km^{2} (400/sq mi)
  - Rank: 25th

Human Achievement Index
  - HAI (2022): 0.6263 "somewhat low" Ranked 61st

GDP
  - Total: baht 154 billion (US$5.3 billion) (2019)
- Time zone: UTC+7 (ICT)
- Postal code: 80xxx
- Calling code: 075
- ISO 3166 code: TH-80
- Website: nakhonsithammarat.go.th nakhonsi.go.th

Nakhon Si Thammarat province (Thai/Southern Thai: นครศรีธรรมราช, Thai pronunciation: [ná(ʔ).kʰɔ̄ːn sǐː tʰām.mā.râːt], Southern Thai pronunciation: [nàʔ.kʰɔ̂ːn.síː.tʰām.mǎʔ.rǎt̚]) is a province (changwat) of Thailand, on the western shore of the Gulf of Thailand. As of 2018, it was the most populous province of Southern Thailand, with a population of approximately 1.5 million. Neighboring provinces are (from south clockwise) Songkhla, Phatthalung, Trang, Krabi and Surat Thani.

The provincial town is one of the oldest in Thailand. Sanskrit inscriptions and hill sites in the province reach back to the seventh century, and from the thirteenth the Nakhon Si Thammarat Kingdom held a group of twelve tributary towns running from Chumphon south to Pahang. Wat Phra Mahathat, built in that period, remains the principal Buddhist monument of southern Thailand.

== Toponymy ==
Nakhon Si Thammarat is the Thai form of Sanskrit Nagara Sri Dharmaraja, meaning 'City of the Sacred Dharma King'. The name is sometimes abbreviated to Nakhon Si (Thai: นครศรีฯ) or simply, Nakhon (Thai: นครฯ). The province is also colloquially called Mueang Khon (Thai: เมืองคอน) and its people Khon Khon (Thai: คนคอน).

== History ==
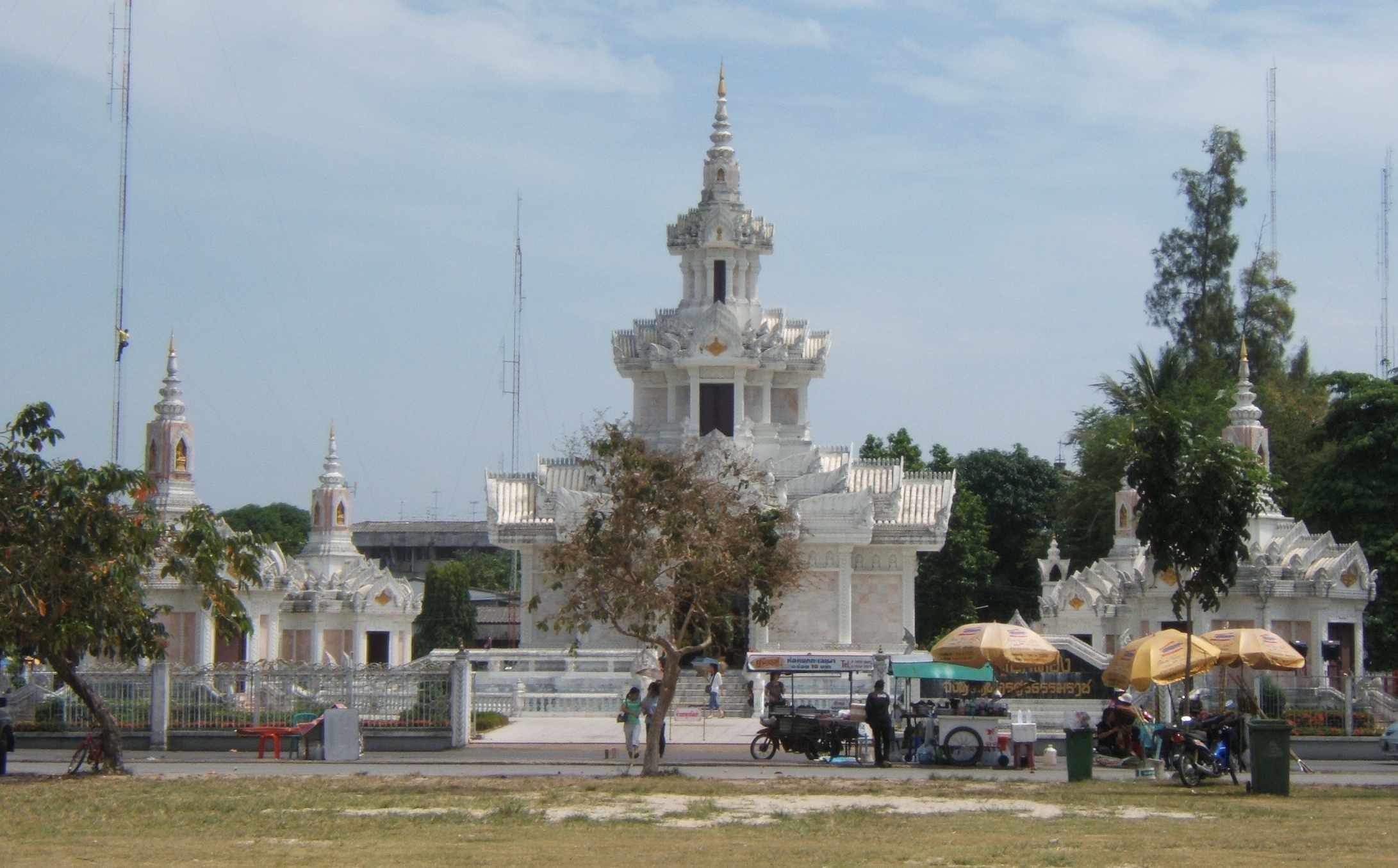
Nakhon Si Thammarat City Pillar Shrine

Nakhon Si Thammarat is one of the oldest cities in Thailand.

=== Early settlement ===
The Wat Maheyong inscription (K. 407) is said to come from Nakhon Si Thammarat. It is in Sanskrit and datable to about the seventh or eighth century, and is probably the earliest evidence in Thailand for Brahmins and Buddhists taking part in the same ritual. Its provenance is disputed. Lucien Fournereau reported the stone from a Wat Mahyeng at Nagara Jaya Çrī, which he placed in what is now Nakhon Pathom province. Earlier material has been recorded on the hills of the province. A miniature gold shivalinga of the 6th or 7th century comes from Khao Phli Mueang in Sichon district. Phanuwat Ueasaman links it by a land route of 103 km to the Khao Chong Khoi rock inscription, the two together being read as early Shaiva Pashupata practice on the authority of Amara Srisuchat. Locally made fine-grain pots from Khao Kha carry a motif shared with pottery from Khao Si Wichai and from Yarang. He takes this as a link between the upper and lower peninsula in the late 6th and 7th centuries.

The earliest settlement in the vicinity of the city was Tha Rua, about ten kilometers south of the modern city, where ceramics from the Song dynasty were found dated to the twelfth century. In ancient times Nakhon Si Thammarat was under the rule of Srivijaya. Its king is said to have established a foothold on the Malay Peninsula at Ligor by 775, and to have built there a sanctuary dedicated to the Buddha and to the bodhisattvas Padmapani and Vajrapani. The stela that records the foundation, the Ligor inscription, is attributed either to Nakhon Si Thammarat or to Chaiya in Surat Thani province, and which of the two is unsettled. Its face A was issued by a Śrīvijayan king in 775, and a Śailendra king left a record on face B of the same stone, most likely somewhat later. Arlo Griffiths reads the stela as implying some presence of representatives of archipelago polities that far north.

=== Nakhon Si Thammarat Kingdom ===
The Chronicles of Nakhon Si Thammarat, composed in the seventeenth century, attributed the foundation of current city of Nakhon Si Thammarat to King Sri Thammasok in the thirteenth century. An inscription found at Chaiya stated that King Sri Thammasok ruled Tambralinga in 1231. King Sri Thammasok constructed Wat Phra Mahathat and introduced Singhalese Theravada Buddhism. The city's chronicle assigns the care of the relic stupa to four monastic orders, Ka Kaeo, Ka Chat, Ka Doem and Ka Ram, each keeping one side. The Nakhon Si Thammarat Kingdom held authorities over "twelve cities" that extended from Chumphon to the north and Pahang to the south. The Ramkamhaeng Stele of Sukhothai first mentioned "Nakhon Si Thammarat" in 1292, which means "The City of King Sri Thammasok" or "The City of the Virtuous king".

The same chronicle tells of a border war with King Uthong at Bang Saphan, settled by agreement, after which Sri Thammasok placed his kin and his realm under Uthong's care. The Nakhon Si Thammarat kingdom ended and the city perished in the fourteenth century. The ruler of Phetchaburi known as Phra Phanom Thale sent his son Phra Phanom Wang to re-establish the city and rule. Nakhon Si Thammarat then came under the influence of Central Siamese Kingdom of Ayutthaya under the mandala system.

=== Ayutthaya period ===
Nakhon Si Thammarat was further incorporated into Ayutthaya, who appointed governors to the city, through centralization under King Trailokanat in the fifteenth century. Nakhon Si Thammarat served as the main seat of Siamese authority over Southern Thailand and the Malay Peninsula, becoming Muang Ek or first-level city. Yamada Nagamasa, the Japanese adventurer, was appointed as the governor of Nakhon Si Thammarat in 1629.

After the Siamese revolution of 1688, the governor of Nakhon Si Thammarat rebelled against the new King Phetracha. King Phetracha sent troops to put down rebels in Nakhon Si Thammarat in 1692.

=== Thonburi period ===
After the Fall of Ayutthaya in 1767, Phra Palat Nu the vice-governor of Nakhon Si Thammarat established himself as the local warlord and ruler over Southern Thailand. King Taksin of Thonburi marched south to subjugate Phra Palat Nu or Chao Phraya Nakhon Nu in 1769. Chao Phraya Nakhon Nu was taken to Thonburi but King Taksin re-installed Nakhon Nu as a tributary ruler of Nakhon Si Thammarat in 1776.

=== Rattanakosin period ===
After Chaophraya Nakhon (Noi), his son and grandson became respective governors of Nakhon Si Thammarat. During the reforms of King Chulalongkorn, the traditional governorship of Nakhon Si Thammarat was abolished and the city was incorporated into the Monthon Nakhon Si Thammarat in 1896.

When the monthon system was abolished in 1932, Nakhon Si Thammarat then became a province until the present.

== Symbols ==
The provincial seal shows the Phra Baromathat chedi of Wat Phra Mahathat Voramahavihan, one of the most important historical sites in southern Thailand. According to the city chronicle it was already built in 311, but archaeology dates it to the 13th century. The chedi was built by the ruler of Malay Buddha Kingdom of Tambralinga, named Chandrabhanu Sridhamaraja of The Patama Vamsa (Lotus Dynasty). The chedi is surrounded by the animals of the Chinese zodiac in the seal. The twelve animals represent the twelve Naksat cities or city-states which were tributary to the Nakhon Si Thammarat kingdom. They are the Rat of Saiburi; the Ox of Pattani; the Tiger of Kelantan; the Rabbit of Pahang (actually a city in Pahang which is said to be submerged by a lake now); the Dragon of Kedah; the Snake of Phatthalung; the Horse of Trang; the Goat of Chumphon; the Monkey of Bantaysamer (might be Chaiya, or a town in Krabi province); the Rooster of Sa-ulau (unidentified city, might be Songkhla, Kanchanadit or Pla Tha); the Dog of Takua Pa and a Pig of Kraburi.

The provincial flower is the Golden Shower Tree (Cassia fistula), and the provincial tree is Millettia atropurpurea. The provincial aquatic life is the climbing perch (Anabas testudineus).

The provincial slogan is เมืองประวัติศาสตร์ พระธาตุทองคำ ชื่นฉ่ำธรรมชาติ แร่ธาตุอุดม เครื่องถมสามกษัตริย์ มากวัดมากศิลป์ ครบสิ้นกุ้งปู, which translates to "A historical town, the golden Phra That, plentiful minerals, three-metal nielloware, numerous temples, abundant shellfish."

== Geography ==
The province is on the Gulf of Thailand on the east side of the Malay Peninsula. The terrain is mostly rugged hilly forest. The province is home to south Thailand's highest peak, Khao Luang, at 1,835 metres (6,000 ft).The total forest area is 1,820 km^{2} (700 sq mi) or 18.4 percent of provincial area.

=== National parks ===
There are six national parks in the province. Five of them belong to region 5 of Thailand's protected areas, together with fifteen parks elsewhere. Khao Pu–Khao Ya falls in region 6. (Visitors in fiscal year 2024).

Khao Pu–Khao Ya National Park	694 km^{2} (268 sq mi)	(87,155)
Khao Luang National Park	570 km^{2} (220 sq mi)	(83,309)
Khao Nan National Park	410 km^{2} (160 sq mi)	(11,259)
Hat Khanom–Mu Ko Thale Tai National Park	312 km^{2} (120 sq mi)	(35,585)
Namtok Yong National Park	205 km^{2} (79 sq mi)	(87,369)
Namtok Si Khit National Park	145 km^{2} (56 sq mi)	(14,293)

=== Wildlife sanctuary ===
There are four wildlife sanctuaries in region 5 (Nakhon Si Thammarat), of which one is in Nakhon Si Thammarat province.

Kathun Wildlife Sanctuary 99 km^{2} (38 sq mi)

Location protected areas of Nakhon Si Thammarat

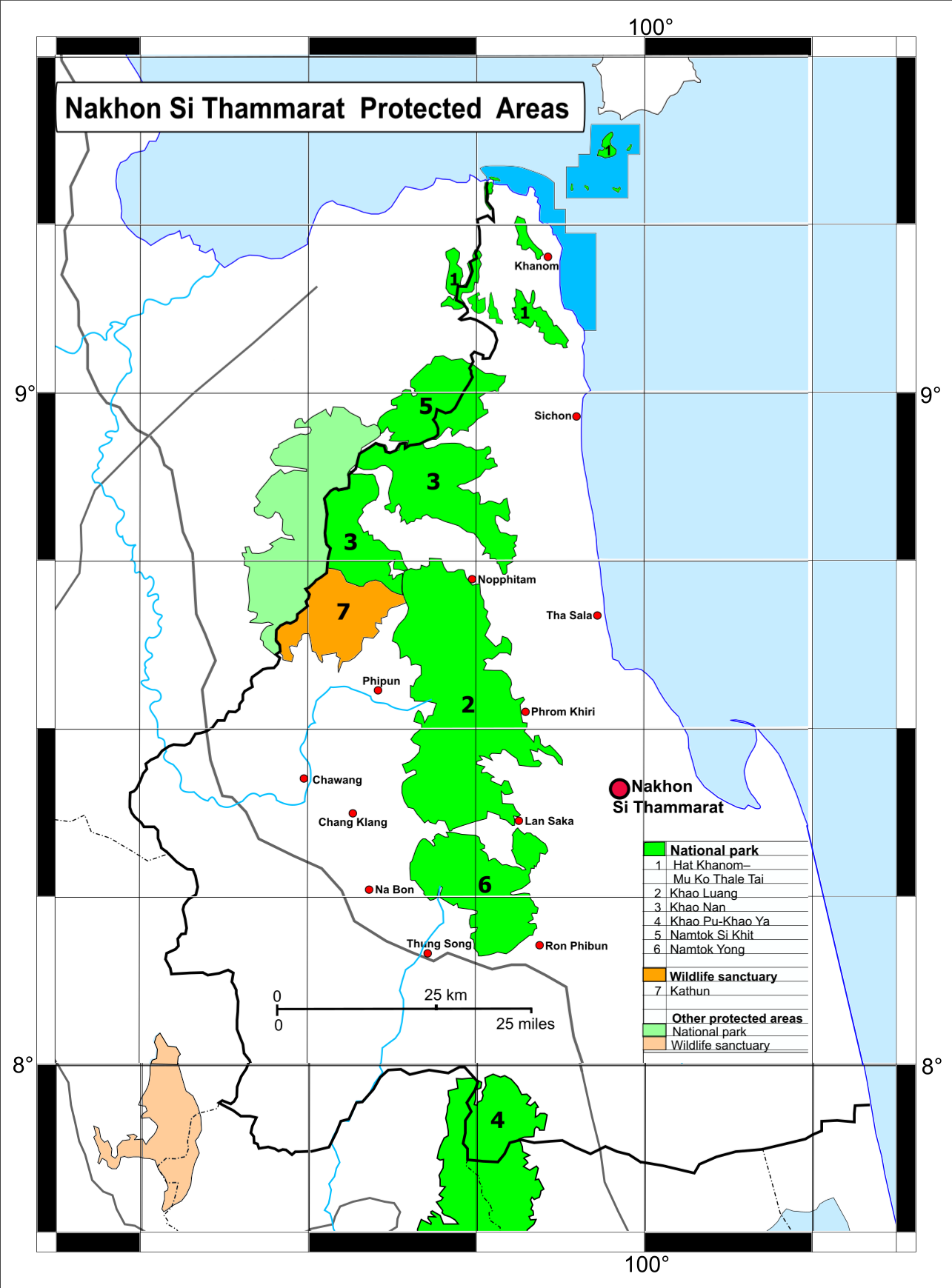
Nakhon Si Thammarat protected areas

	National park
1	Hat Khanom-Mu Ko Thale Tai
2	Khao Luang
3	Khao Nan
4	Khao Pu-Khao Ya
5	Namtok Si Khit
6	Namtok Yong

	Wildlife sanctuary
7	Kathun

== Environment ==
Forested peat swamp forests cover more than 9,900 hectares on the borders of Nakhon Si Thammarat, Phatthalung, and Songkhla provinces. About 800 hectares of the peat swamp were destroyed by 88 fires in the first half of 2019. The Royal Forest Department says that most of the fires in the Khuan Khreng peat swamp forest were man-made. Criminals clear the forest for the illegal expansion of rubber and oil palm plantations. Honey collectors and fishermen were also complicit as they burn grass to catch fish or to collect wild honey. Khuan Khreng peat swamp was hit by drought in what is normally the rainy season making it susceptible to arson. The forest is surrounded by oil palm plantations and surface water in the forest has been drained out to feed the plantations.

== Religion ==
Nakhon Si Thammarat people Most believe in Buddhism, approximately 92.08%, followed by Islam which is approximately 7.03%, Christianity in addition to other religions at approximately 0.89% (population data: 1,516,499 people in 2009).

Population by religion
Buddhism	92.08%
Islam	7.03%
Other	0.89%

== Economy ==
Tourism has become a first-tier tourist province, as defined by the central government, joining 22 other first-tier provinces. In 2019, it is projected to receive four million tourists, 80 per cent of them domestic, largely attracted by religious sites. They contributed more than 11 billion baht to the provincial economy. The Airports Department plans to expand Nakhon Si Thammarat airport runways and terminal by 2022 to deal with an anticipated increase in international flights to support foreign visitor arrivals. The province has 320 hotels with 8,800 rooms, up from 310 hotels and 7,000 rooms in 2018.

== Administrative divisions ==
Map of twenty three districts

=== Provincial government ===
Nakhon Si Thammarat is divided into 23 districts (amphoes). The districts are further divided into 165 subdistricts (tambons) and 1428 villages (mubans).

1. Mueang Nakhon Si Thammarat
2. Phrom Khiri
3. Lan Saka
4. Chawang
5. Phipun
6. Chian Yai
7. Cha-uat
8. Tha Sala
9. Thung Song
10. Na Bon
11. Thung Yai
12. Pak Phanang
13. Ron Phibun
14. Sichon
15. Khanom
16. Hua Sai
17. Bang Khan
18. Tham Phannara
19. Chulabhorn
20. Phra Phrom
21. Nopphitam
22. Chang Klang
23. Chaloem Phra Kiat

=== Local government ===
As of 26 November 2019, there are: one Nakhon Si Thammarat Provincial Administration Organisation (ongkan borihan suan changwat) and 54 municipal (thesaban) areas in the province. Nakhon Si Thammarat has (thesaban nakhon) status. Pak Phun, Thung Song, Pak Panang and Tha Sala have town (thesaban mueang) status. Further 50 subdistrict municipalities (thesaban tambon). The non-municipal areas are administered by 130 Subdistrict Administrative Organisations - SAO (ongkan borihan suan tambon).

== Transport ==
Nakhon Si Thammarat is served by Nakhon Si Thammarat Airport and the Nakhon Si Thammarat Railway Station.

== Health ==
Maharaj Nakhon Si Thammarat Hospital is the main hospital of the province, operated by the Ministry of Public Health.

== Education ==
=== Universities ===
==== Public universities ====
- Walailak University
- Nakhon Si Thammarat Rajabhat University
- Rajamangala University of Technology Srivijaya
  - College of Industrial Technology and Management
  - Nakhon Si Thammarat Saiyai Campus
  - Nakhon Si Thammarat Thungyai Campus
- Thaksin University
  - Management for Development College, Nakhon Si Thammarat Education Center
- Mahachulalongkornrajavidyalaya University, Nakhon Si Thammarat Campus
- Mahamakut Buddhist University, Sithammasokkarat Campus
- Ramkhamhaeng University, Nakhon Si Thammarat Regional Campus in Honour of His Majesty the King
- Sukhothai Thammathirat Open University, Nakhon Si Thammarat Regional Distance Education Center
- Boromarajonani College of Nursing Nakhon Si Thammarat

=== Vocational colleges ===
==== Public vocational colleges ====
- Nakhon Si Thammarat Technical College
- Thung Song Technical College
- Sichon Technical College
- Nakhon Si Thammarat Seaboard Industrial College
- Nakhon Si Thammarat Polytechnic College
- Nakhon Si Thammarat Vocational College
- Nakhon Si Thammarat Arts and Crafts College
- Nakhon Si Thammarat College of Agriculture and Technology
- Nakhon Si Thammarat Industrial and Community Education College
- Hua Sai Industrial and Community Education College
- Phrom Khiri Industrial and Community Education College
- Nakhon Si Thammarat Colleges of Dramatic Arts
- Nakhon Si Thammarat College of Fine Arts

==== Private vocational colleges ====
- Innovation Technological College
- Jaruspichakorn College of Technology
- Satapat Nakhon Technological College
- Thurakit Bundit Technological College
- Nakhon Commercial Vocational College
- Prateesasana Business Administration College
- Thaksin Vocational Technological College
- Pakphanang Vocational College
- Southern Technological College
- Thungsong Commercial College
- Charoenmit Commercial Technological College
- Sichon Commercial Technological College
- Virasinpin Vocational College
- Sakdisilpin Commercial School

== Human achievement index 2022 ==
Health	Education	Employment	Income
49	23	73	41
Housing	Family	Transport	Participation
52	50	24	51
Province Nakhon Si Thammarat, with an HAI 2022 value of 0.6263 is "somewhat low", occupies place 61 in the ranking.

Rank	Classification
1 - 13	"high"
14 - 29	"somewhat high"
30 - 45	"average"
46 - 61	"somewhat low"
62 - 77	"low"

Map with provinces and HAI 2022 rankings

== Sports ==
=== Football ===
Men's football club
Team	Leagues	Level	Years	Region	Position
Nakhon Si Thammarat F.C.	Regional League Division 2	Level 3	2009	Southern	3rd
Nakhon Si Thammarat F.C.	Regional League Division 2	Level 3	2010	Southern	11th
Nakhon Si Thammarat F.C.	Regional League Division 2	Level 3	2011	Southern	13th
Nakhon Si Thammarat F.C.	Regional League Division 2	Level 3	2012	Southern	7th
Nakhon Si Heritage F.C.	Regional League Division 2	Level 3	2013	Southern	9th
Nakhon Si Heritage F.C.	Regional League Division 2	Level 3	2014	Southern	12th
Nakhon Si Heritage F.C.	Regional League Division 2	Level 3	2015	Southern	9th
Nakhon Si Heritage F.C.	Regional League Division 2	Level 3	2016	Southern	12th
Nakhon Si Heritage F.C.	Thai Football Amateur Tournament	Level 5	2018	Upper Southern	
Muang Khon United F.C.	Thai Football Division 3	Level 4	2016	Southern	4th
Muang Khon United F.C.	Thai Football Amateur Tournament	Level 5	2017	Upper Southern	2nd
Muang Khon United F.C.	Thai Football Amateur Tournament	Level 5	2018	Upper Southern	
Nakhon Si Thammarat Unity F.C.	Thai League 3	Level 3	2017	Lower	8th
Nakhon Si United F.C.	Thai League 3	Level 3	2018	Lower	
Women's football club
Team	Leagues	Level	Years	Region	Position
Thung Song City F.C.	Thai Women's Division 1 League	Level 2	2011	Thailand	5th
Nakhon Si Thammarat Women F.C.	Thai Women's Division 1 League	Level 2	2013	Thailand	2nd
Nakhon Si Lady SS F.C.	Thai Women's League	Level 1	2017	Thailand	6th
Youth football club
Team	Leagues	Level	Years	Region	Position
Nakhon Si Heritage F.C. U13	Thailand Youth League	Level 1	2016–17	Southern	4th
Nakhon Si Heritage F.C. U13	Thailand Youth League	Level 1	2017–18	Southern	3rd
Nakhon Si Thammarat F.C. U13	Thailand Youth League	Level 1	2017–18	Southern	8th
Nakhon Si Heritage F.C. U17	Thailand Youth League	Level 1	2016–17	Southern	2nd
Nakhon Si Thammarat Unity F.C. U19	Thailand Youth League	Level 1	2017–18	Southern	4th

=== Volleyball clubs ===
Men's Volleyball Club
Team	Leagues	Level	Years	Region	Position
Supreme Nakhon Si Thammarat	Men's Volleyball Thailand League	Level 1	2010–11	Thailand	8th
Women's Volleyball Club
Team	Leagues	Level	Years	Region	Position
Supreme Nakhon Si Thammarat	Women's Volleyball Thailand League	Level 1	2010–11	Thailand	5th
Supreme Nakhon Si Thammarat	Women's Volleyball Thailand League	Level 1	2011–12	Thailand	2nd
Supreme Nakhon Si Thammarat	Women's Volleyball Thailand League	Level 1	2012–13	Thailand	5th

== See also ==
- Nakhon Si Thammarat Kingdom
