= Khanom district =

Khanom ขนอม
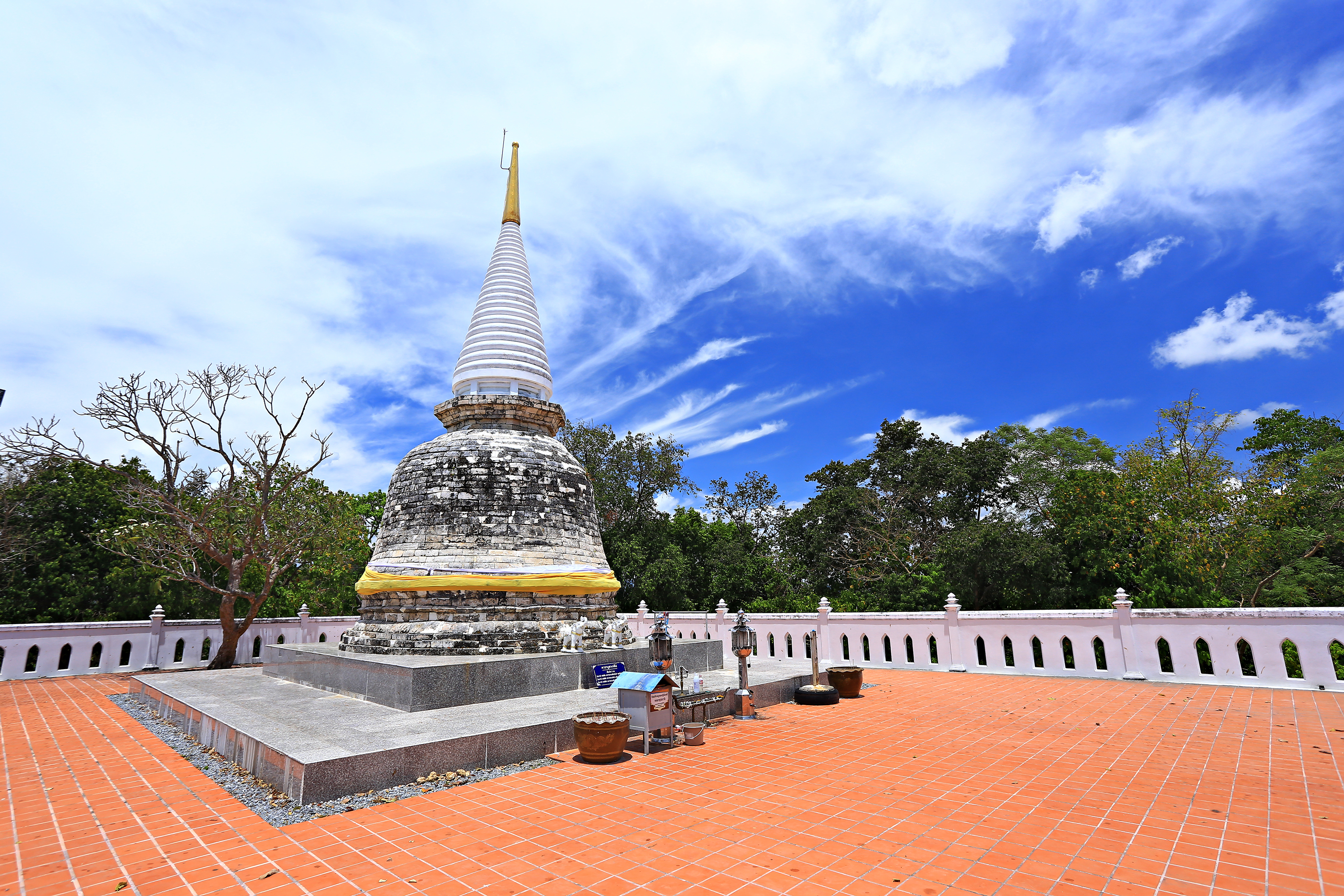
- District

- District location in Nakhon Si Thammarat province
- Coordinates: 9°12′17″N 99°51′40″E
- Country: Thailand
- Province: Nakhon Si Thammarat
- Seat: Khanom

Area
  - Total: 433.926 km^{2} (167.540 sq mi)

Population (2005)
  - Total: 27,572
  - Density: 63.5/km^{2} (164/sq mi)
- Time zone: UTC+7 (ICT)
- Postal code: 80210
- Geocode: 8015

Khanom (Thai: ขนอม, pronounced [kʰā.nɔ̌ːm]) is the northernmost district (amphoe) of Nakhon Si Thammarat province, southern Thailand.

== Geography ==
The district is in the north of the province. To the west is Surat Thani province, while to the north and east is the Gulf of Thailand. Neighboring districts are (from the south clockwise) Sichon of Nakhon Si Thammarat and Don Sak of Surat Thani.

Most of the coast line of district will be protected as part of the Hat Khanom - Mu Ko Thale Tai National Park, which is in the process of creation. The coast of the district consists of a series of beaches among the limestone and shale mountains of northern Nakhon Si Thammarat Range. Nai Plao Beach is the most popular of these beaches. Several caves are found in the hills, the most famous one is Khao Wang Thong cave. The major hills within the districts are Khao Luang (815 metres (2,674 ft)), Khao Phlao and Khao Dat Fa (732 metres (2,402 ft)) at the southeastern boundary to Sichon, and Khao Chai Son (535 metres (1,755 ft)) adjacent Khanom town at the Khanom Bay, the mouth of Khlong Khanom.

The main road is Highway 401, which passes through the southwestern part of the district. Route 4014 connects the district center which that highway, while Hwy 4142 connects the center with Don Sak.

Khao Nom (เขานม), was one of the former names of Khanom District owing to the breast-shaped surrounding mountains.

== History ==
In 1365 a first town (mueang) named Tranom (ตระนอม) was established, which was a subordinate of Nakhon Si Thammarat. During the thesaphiban administrative reforms of the early-20th century it became a tambon in Sichon District. On 1 March 1939 it was made a minor district (king amphoe), consisting of the two tambons Khanom and Thong Nian. The minor district was upgraded to a full district on 11 December 1959.

A third tambon, Khuan Thong, was created on 25 December 1963 with three mubans from Thong Nian and two from Khanom.

The sanitary district (sukhaphiban) Khanom was established on 28 December 1945, which became official on 28 January 1957. On 25 May 1999 it was converted to a township (thesaban tambon), as all sanitary districts were upgraded to municipalities.

Wat Kradangnga is the oldest Buddhist temple of the district, dating back to the Ayutthaya Kingdom.

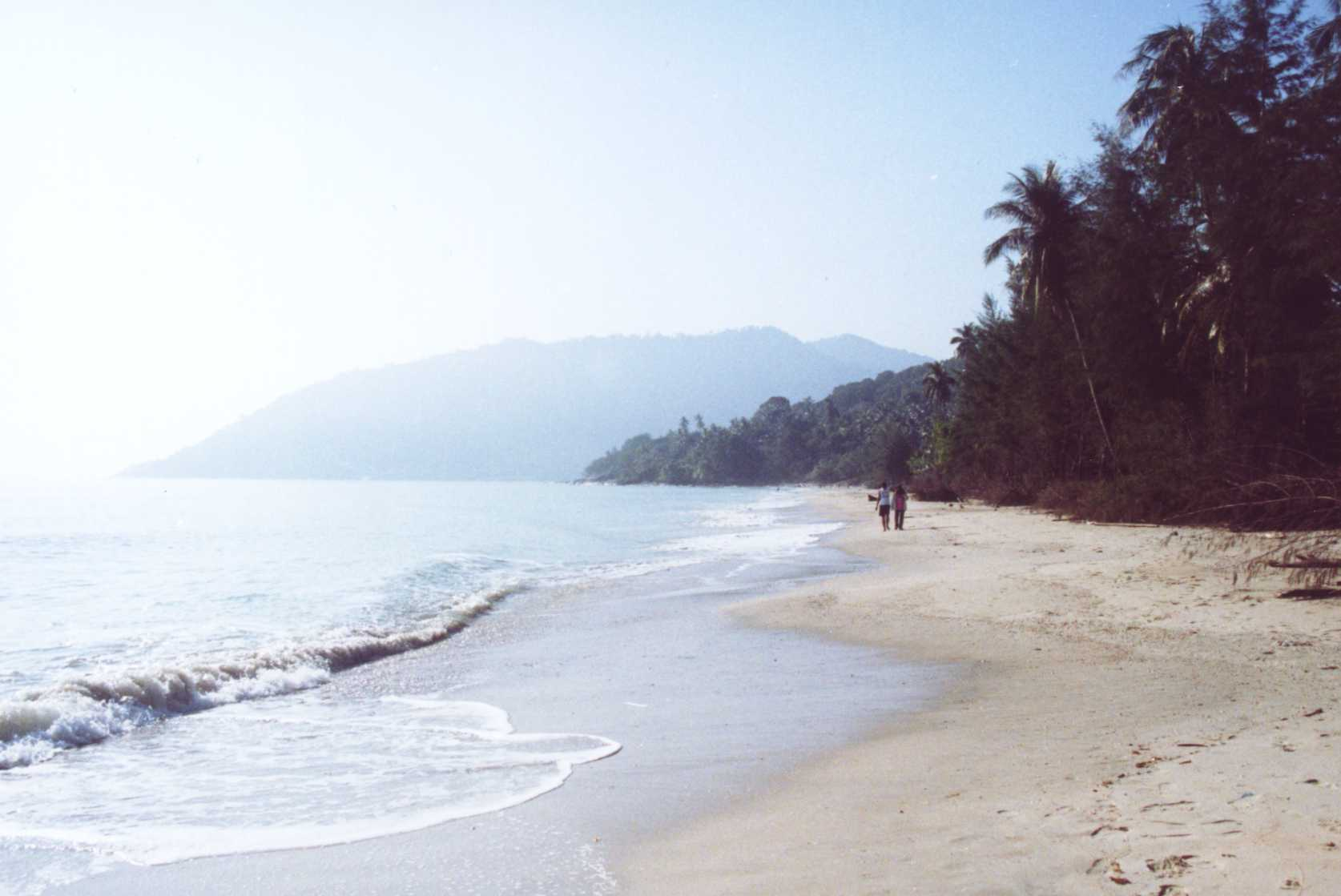
Nai Plao Beach

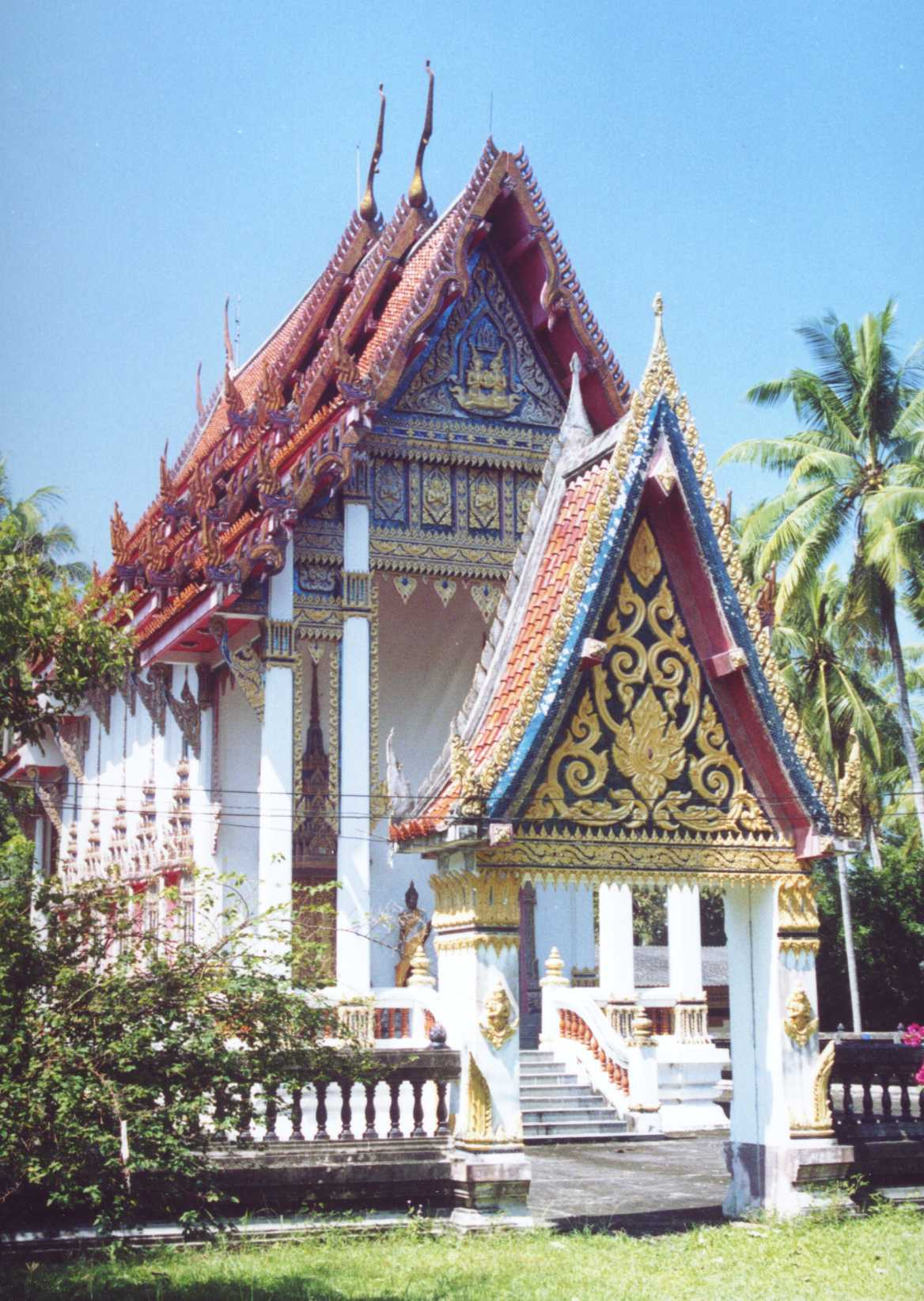
Wat Kradangnga

== Education ==
There are two high schools - Khanom Phitthaya High School and Thong Nian Khana Phi Ban High School - and a campus of the Rajamangala University of Technology Srivijaya.

== Administration ==
The district is divided into three sub-districts (tambons), which are further subdivided into 34 villages (mubans). Khanom itself has sub-district municipality (thesaban tambon) status and covers part of tambon Khanom, village 1 and parts of village 3, altogether an area of 1.76 km^{2}. Tambon Thong Nian forms another sub-district municipality. The non-municipal areas of tambon Khanom and Khuan Thong are each administered by a tambon administrative organization (TAO).

No.	Name	Thai name	Villages	Pop.	OTOP
1.	Khanom	ขนอม	14	12,557	Shrimp chili paste
2.	Khuan Thong	ควนทอง	12	10,174	Banana chips
3.	Thong Nian	ท้องเนียน	8	4,841	Fish sauce

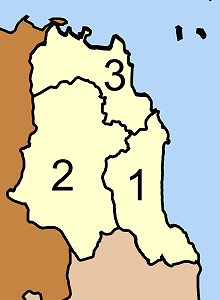
