= Thailand Youth League =

- Organising body: Sport Authority of Thailand; Football Association of Thailand
- Founded: 2016
- Folded: 2023
- Country: Thailand
- Last champions: Chainat Hornbill (Under-14); Assumption United (Under-16); Buriram United (Under-18)
- Broadcaster(s): T Sports
- Website: http://www.thailandyouthleague.com/

Thailand Youth League (Thai: ลีกเยาวชนแห่งชาติ) is a tournament of Thai youth association football for development Thai football to compete in the international level and advance to FIFA World Cup, what are ones of government's policies. The tournament is under controlling from Sport Authority of Thailand (SAT) as a long-term project for 10 years at least for developing young Thai players continuously. From 2020 Thailand Youth League will move in the control of Football Association of Thailand and change the name to FA Thailand Youth League.

== Format ==
Thailand Youth League holds 4 age-group tournaments, under-13, under-15, under-17, and under-19 all participate clubs will be divided into regions like Thai League 4. The tournament will be divided into 3 rounds as qualification round, regional league round, and championship round.

== Champions history ==
=== Championship round winners ===
| Year | Age group | Champion | Runner-up | Third place | Fourth place |
|---|---|---|---|---|---|
Thailand Youth League
| 2016–17 | Under-13 | Buriram United | Assumption United | PTT Rayong | Sports Association of Songkhla |
| 2016–17 | Under-15 | Buriram United | Banbueng | Chonburi | Chiangrai United |
| 2016–17 | Under-17 | Assumption United | Chonburi | Super Power Samut Prakan | Prachuap |
| 2016–17 | Under-19 | Chonburi | Assumption United | Muangthong United | Sports Association of Ratchaburi |
| 2017–18 | Under-13 | Assumption United | Bangkok United | Suphanburi | Pattaya United |
| 2017–18 | Under-15 | Assumption United | Chonburi | Sports Association of Kalasin | Pattaya United |
| 2017–18 | Under-17 | Bangkok Glass | Chiangmai | Suphanburi | Sports Association of Samut Sakhon |
| 2017–18 | Under-19 | Muangthong United | Chonburi | Assumption United | Ayutthaya United |
| 2018–19 | Under-13 | Assumption United | Buriram United | Bangkok United | Muangthong United |
| 2018–19 | Under-15 | Assumption United | BG Pathum United | Police Tero | Samut Sakhon |
| 2018–19 | Under-17 | Chonburi | Banbueng | Buriram United | Sports Association of Udon Thani |
| 2018–19 | Under-19 | Muangthong United | Sports Association of Nong Bua Lamphu | Nakhon Ratchasima | Assumption United |
FA Thailand Youth League
| 2022–23 | Under-14 | Chainat Hornbill | Assumption United | Nongbua Pitchaya | Pattaya Dolphins United |
| 2022–23 | Under-16 | Assumption United | Nonthaburi United | Nongbua Pitchaya | Buriram United |
| 2022–23 | Under-18 | Buriram United | Chonburi | Bangkok United | Assumption United |
