= 2023–24 Thai League 3 Southern Region =

Thai League 3 Southern Region
- Season: 2023–24
- Dates: 16 September 2023 – 25 February 2024
- Champions: Songkhla
- Relegated: MH Nakhon Si City; Trang
- T3 National Championship: Songkhla; Phatthalung
- Matches: 132
- Goals: 334 (2.53 per match)
- Top goalscorer: (Brazil) Mairon Natan Pereira Maciel Oliveira (20 goals; Pattani)
- Best goalkeeper: (Thailand) Jarudet Ramudth (15 clean sheets; Songkhla)
- Biggest home win: 6 goals difference Pattani 6–0 Ranong United (1 October 2023)
- Biggest away win: 8 goals difference Ranong United 0–8 Songkhla (28 October 2023)
- Highest scoring: 8 goals Ranong United 0–8 Songkhla (28 October 2023); Pattani 4–4 Nara United (28 October 2023)
- Longest winning run: 6 matches Songkhla; Pattani
- Longest unbeaten run: 22 matches Songkhla
- Longest winless run: 11 matches Trang
- Longest losing run: 7 matches MH Nakhon Si City

The 2023–24 Thai League 3 Southern region is a region in the regional stage of the 2023–24 Thai League 3. The tournament was sponsored by Rising Sun fertilizer, and known as the Rising Sun Fertilizer League for sponsorship purposes. A total of 12 teams located in Southern of Thailand will compete in the league of the Southern region.

== Changes from last season ==
=== Promotion or relegation ===
Team	League		Notes
Team	Previous season	Current season	Notes
From Thai League 3
Mueang Kon D United (substituted off)	Thai League 3	Thailand Semi-pro League	
Young Singh Hatyai United (substituted off)	Thai League 3	Thailand Semi-pro League	Relegation due to club licensing reason
To Thai League 3
Ranong United (substituted off)	Thai League 2	Thai League 3	
Satun (substituted on)	Thailand Amateur League	Thai League 3	

=== Renaming ===
Team	Old name	Current name
Yala	Jalor City F.C.	F.C. Yala

== Teams ==
=== Number of teams by province ===
Position	Province	Number	Teams
1	Trang	2	Muang Trang United and Trang
4	Nakhon Si Thammarat	1	MH Nakhon Si City
4	Narathiwat	1	Nara United
4	Pattani	1	Pattani
4	Phatthalung	1	Phatthalung
4	Phuket	1	Phuket Andaman
4	Ranong	1	Ranong United
4	Satun	1	Satun
4	Songkhla	1	Songkhla
4	Surat Thani	1	Wiang Sa Surat Thani City
4	Yala	1	Yala

=== Stadiums and locations ===
Locations of the 2023–24 Thai League 3 Southern region teams

Team	Location	Stadium	Coordinates
MH Nakhon Si City	Nakhon Si Thammarat (Ron Phibun)	Nakhon Si Thammarat PAO. Stadium	8°11′56″N 99°52′09″E
Muang Trang United	Trang (Mueang)	Trang City Municipality Stadium	7°33′12″N 99°36′57″E
Nara United	Narathiwat (Mueang)	Narathiwat PAO. Stadium	6°25′31″N 101°48′23″E
Pattani	Pattani (Mueang)	Pattani PAO. Stadium	6°53′20″N 101°14′41″E
Phatthalung	Phatthalung (Mueang)	Phatthalung PAO. Stadium	7°37′00″N 100°02′55″E
Phuket Andaman	Phuket (Mueang)	Surakul Stadium	7°53′20″N 98°22′19″E
Ranong United	Ranong (Mueang)	Ranong Provincial Stadium	9°57′35″N 98°38′25″E
Satun	Satun (Mueang)	Satun PAO. Stadium	6°39′05″N 100°04′44″E
Songkhla	Songkhla (Mueang)	Tinsulanon Stadium	7°12′26″N 100°35′55″E
Trang	Trang (Mueang)	Trang City Municipality Stadium	7°33′12″N 99°36′57″E
Wiang Sa Surat Thani City	Surat Thani (Wiang Sa)	Ban Song Subdistrict Municipality Stadium	8°39′43″N 99°22′32″E
Yala	Yala (Mueang)	Stadium of Yala Rajabhat University	6°33′03″N 101°17′30″E

=== Foreign players ===
A T3 team could register 3 foreign players from foreign players all around the world. A team can use 3 foreign players on the field in each game.

Note :
(substituted off) : players who released during second leg transfer window;
(substituted on) : players who registered during second leg transfer window.

AFC member countries players.
CAF member countries players.
CONCACAF member countries players.
CONMEBOL member countries players.
OFC member countries players.
UEFA member countries players.
No foreign player registered.

Club	Leg	Player 1	Player 2	Player 3
MH Nakhon Si City	1st	(Brazil) Edson dos Santos Costa Júnior (substituted off)	(Nigeria) Omogba Esoh (substituted off)	(Belgium) Jordy Vleugels (substituted off)
MH Nakhon Si City	2nd			(Ivory Coast) Boubacar Koné (substituted on)
Muang Trang United	1st	(Republic of the Congo) Trésor Muhindo Fundi Runiga (substituted off)	(South Korea) Han Yun-soo (substituted off)	(South Korea) Jung Hyeon-gu
Muang Trang United	2nd	(Belgium) Jordy Vleugels (substituted on)	(Iran) Hamzeh Sari (substituted on)	(South Korea) Jung Hyeon-gu
Nara United	1st		(Argentina) Juan Francisco Odorisio	(Japan) Ryohei Maeda
Nara United	2nd	(France) Annor Ferdinand (substituted on)	(Argentina) Juan Francisco Odorisio	(Japan) Ryohei Maeda
Pattani	1st	(Brazil) Mairon Natan Pereira Maciel Oliveira	(Brazil) Felipe Nunes	(Cameroon) Lionel Frank Touko Nzola
Pattani	2nd	(Brazil) Mairon Natan Pereira Maciel Oliveira	(Brazil) Felipe Nunes	(Cameroon) Lionel Frank Touko Nzola
Phatthalung	1st	(Brazil) Osvaldo Nascimento dos Santos Neto	(Brazil) Jhonatan Bernardo	(Laos) Mitsada Saitaifah
Phatthalung	2nd	(Brazil) Osvaldo Nascimento dos Santos Neto	(Brazil) Jhonatan Bernardo	(Laos) Mitsada Saitaifah
Phuket Andaman	1st	(Brazil) Diogo Pereira (substituted off)	(Iraq) Selwan Al-Jaberi (substituted off)	(Brazil) Jefferson Mateus Quirino Rodrigues
Phuket Andaman	2nd	(South Korea) Kim Da-ha (substituted on)	(South Korea) Um Da-bin (substituted on)	(Brazil) Jefferson Mateus Quirino Rodrigues
Ranong United	1st		(Italy) Leo Antonio Anthony (substituted off)	(Japan) Yuto Yoshijima (substituted off)
Ranong United	2nd	(France) Elie Jean-Jacques Lobouet (substituted on)	(Ivory Coast) Camara Cheick Habib (substituted on)	(South Korea) Lee Gi-been (substituted on)
Satun	1st	(South Korea) Hyeon Seung-yun (substituted off)	(South Korea) Jeong Jin-yeong (substituted off)	(Brazil) Douglas Mineiro
Satun	2nd	(Nigeria) Opeyaemi Korede Ajayi (substituted on)	(Russia) Erik Zaerko (substituted on)	(Brazil) Douglas Mineiro
Songkhla	1st	(Japan) Reon Saito (substituted off)	(Brazil) Victor Clemente de Oliveira Capinan	(Nigeria) Ekene Victor Azike
Songkhla	2nd	(Nigeria) Aliu Micheal Abdul (substituted on)	(Brazil) Victor Clemente de Oliveira Capinan	(Nigeria) Ekene Victor Azike
Trang	1st		(Brazil) Tiago Severino da Silva (substituted off)	(Egypt) Morsy Mohamed (substituted off)
Trang	2nd	(Morocco) Soufaine Hendi (substituted on)	(Algeria) Ilyes Bechiri (substituted on)	(South Korea) Hwang Chan-won (substituted on)
Wiang Sa Surat Thani City	1st		(Brazil) Josimar Tiago da Silva	(Mali) Toloba Aremu Kassim Mouyidine
Wiang Sa Surat Thani City	2nd	(Brazil) Hugo Leonardo Morais Santos (substituted on)	(Brazil) Josimar Tiago da Silva	(Mali) Toloba Aremu Kassim Mouyidine
Yala	1st	(Guinea) Barry Lelouma (substituted off)	(Iran) Sadegh Mohammad (substituted off)	(Egypt) Abdelaziz Said El Shaer
Yala	2nd		(Egypt) Mohamed Abdel Fattah (substituted on)	(Egypt) Abdelaziz Said El Shaer

== League table ==
=== Standings ===
Pos	Team	Pld	W	D	L	GF	GA	GD	Pts	Qualification or relegation
1	Songkhla (C, Q)	22	17	5	0	46	7	+39	56	Qualification to the National Championship stage
2	Phatthalung (Q)	22	14	6	2	56	15	+41	48	Qualification to the National Championship stage
3	Pattani	22	13	4	5	45	24	+21	43	
4	Satun	22	10	6	6	27	19	+8	36	
5	Muang Trang United	22	9	6	7	24	18	+6	33	
6	Wiang Sa Surat Thani City	22	10	2	10	31	32	−1	32	
7	Nara United	22	9	4	9	25	25	0	31	
8	Yala	22	5	8	9	14	20	−6	23	
9	Phuket Andaman	22	6	3	13	23	35	−12	21	
10	MH Nakhon Si City (R)	22	4	5	13	21	35	−14	17	Relegation to the Thailand Semi-pro League (Note: MH Nakhon Si City was administratively relegated to the 2025 Thailand Semi-pro League for failing to meet club licensing standards.)
11	Ranong United	22	3	6	13	14	46	−32	15	
12	Trang (R)	22	3	3	16	8	58	−50	12	Relegation to the Thailand Semi-pro League

Source: Thai League
Rules for classification: 1) Points; 2) Head-to-head points; 3) Head-to-head goal difference; 4) Head-to-head goal scored; 5) Overall goal difference; 6) Overall goal scored; 7) Fair play points; 8) Play-off without extra time).
(C) Champions; (Q) Qualified for the phase indicated; (R) Relegated

=== Positions by round ===
Team ╲ Round	1	2	3	4	5	6	7	8	9	10	11	12	13	14	15	16	17	18	19	20	21	22
Songkhla	4	5	5	3	3	3	2	1	1	1	1	1	1	1	1	1	1	1	1	1	1	1
Phatthalung	1	1	2	2	2	2	3	3	3	3	3	3	3	3	3	3	3	3	2	3	2	2
Pattani	3	2	1	1	1	1	1	2	2	2	2	2	2	2	2	2	2	2	3	2	3	3
Satun	7	8	6	4	4	4	4	4	4	4	4	4	4	5	5	7	5	6	6	5	5	4
Muang Trang United	9	11	10	11	12	12	12	10	9	9	8	7	7	7	7	5	4	4	4	4	4	5
Wiang Sa Surat Thani City	2	6	7	9	9	9	9	7	5	7	6	6	5	6	6	4	6	7	7	7	7	6
Nara United	5	3	3	6	6	5	6	8	6	5	5	5	6	4	4	6	7	5	5	6	6	7
Yala	8	9	9	8	8	8	7	9	10	10	9	9	9	8	10	9	8	8	8	8	8	8
Phuket Andaman	10	7	8	5	5	6	8	6	8	8	10	10	10	10	9	10	10	9	9	9	9	9
MH Nakhon Si City	6	4	4	7	7	7	5	5	7	6	7	8	8	9	8	8	9	10	10	10	10	10
Ranong United	12	10	12	10	11	11	11	12	11	11	11	11	11	11	11	11	11	11	11	11	11	11
Trang	11	12	11	12	10	10	10	11	12	12	12	12	12	12	12	12	12	12	12	12	12	12

Source: Thai League
= Qualification to the National Championship stage; = Relegation to the Thailand Semi-pro League

=== Results by round ===
Team ╲ Round	1	2	3	4	5	6	7	8	9	10	11	12	13	14	15	16	17	18	19	20	21	22
Songkhla	W	D	D	W	W	W	W	W	W	D	D	W	W	W	W	D	W	W	W	W	W	W
Phatthalung	W	W	D	W	W	W	D	D	D	D	D	W	W	W	W	W	L	W	W	L	W	W
Pattani	W	W	W	W	W	W	D	L	D	W	D	W	D	W	W	W	W	L	L	W	L	L
Satun	D	D	W	W	L	W	D	W	L	W	D	L	D	L	L	L	W	D	W	W	W	W
Muang Trang United	L	L	L	L	D	D	L	W	W	D	W	W	D	L	W	W	W	W	D	D	W	L
Wiang Sa Surat Thani City	W	L	D	L	L	L	W	W	W	L	W	W	D	L	L	W	L	L	W	L	W	W
Nara United	W	W	D	L	L	D	D	L	W	W	W	D	L	W	L	L	L	W	W	L	W	L
Yala	L	L	W	D	D	L	W	L	L	D	D	L	W	W	L	D	D	D	L	D	L	W
Phuket Andaman	L	W	D	W	L	L	L	W	L	L	L	L	L	W	W	L	D	D	L	L	L	W
MH Nakhon Si City	D	W	D	L	D	L	W	D	L	W	L	L	D	L	W	L	L	L	L	L	L	L
Ranong United	L	L	L	D	D	D	L	L	W	L	L	D	D	L	L	W	L	D	L	W	L	L
Trang	L	L	L	L	W	D	L	L	L	L	D	L	L	L	L	L	W	L	D	W	L	L

Source: Thai League
W = Won; D = Drawn; L = Lost

=== Results ===
Home \ Away	MNS	MTG	NRA	PTN	PLG	PKA	RNU	STN	SKA	TRG	WSC	YLA
MH Nakhon Si City	—	3–0	1–3	0–2	1–1	1–3	1–0	0–2	0–1	0–1	2–2	2–0
Muang Trang United	2–0	—	3–2	4–0	1–2	3–0	0–0	1–2	0–2	0–0	1–0	0–0
Nara United	2–1	0–0	—	0–1	0–0	2–1	1–1	3–0	0–1	2–0	0–1	1–0
Pattani	2–0	0–1	4–4	—	2–2	2–0	6–0	3–1	0–2	3–0	4–0	2–0
Phatthalung	6–1	2–0	3–0	3–1	—	2–0	4–0	2–2	1–1	3–0	1–0	3–0
Phuket Andaman	1–0	0–1	0–1	2–0	0–5	—	4–1	0–1	2–2	0–1	2–0	1–1
Ranong United	1–0	1–3	1–2	0–0	1–5	0–0	—	1–0	0–8	3–0	1–2	0–0
Satun	1–1	0–0	1–0	0–1	1–0	5–1	2–0	—	0–1	3–0	3–2	2–0
Songkhla	2–1	1–0	2–0	1–1	2–1	2–0	2–0	1–1	—	4–0	4–0	1–0
Trang	1–4	0–3	1–0	1–6	0–6	0–4	2–2	0–0	0–4	—	1–6	0–1
Wiang Sa Surat Thani City	1–1	3–1	0–2	2–3	0–2	3–1	2–1	2–0	0–2	3–0	—	1–0
Yala	1–1	0–0	3–0	1–2	2–2	2–1	2–0	0–0	0–0	1–0	0–1	—

Source: Thai League
Legend: Blue = home team win; Yellow = draw; Red = away team win.
For upcoming matches, an "a" indicates there is an article about the rivalry between the two participants.

== Season statistics ==
=== Top scorers ===
As of 24 February 2024.

Rank	Player	Club	Goals
1	(Brazil) Natan Oliveira	Pattani	20
2	(Brazil) Jhonatan Bernardo	Phatthalung	16
3	(Brazil) Neto Santos	Phatthalung	15
4	(Nigeria) Ekene Victor Azike	Songkhla	12
5	(Thailand) Natthawut Aiamchan	Wiang Sa Surat Thani City	10

=== Hat-tricks ===
Player	For	Against	Result	Date
(Brazil) Natan Oliveira^{4}	Pattani	Ranong United	6–0 (H)	1 October 2023
(Brazil) Natan Oliveira	Pattani	Trang	1–6 (A)	8 October 2023
(Nigeria) Ekene Victor Azike^{4}	Songkhla	Ranong United	0–8 (A)	28 October 2023
(Thailand) Manso Ausman	Nara United	Pattani	4–4 (A)	28 October 2023
(Brazil) Edson dos Santos Costa Júnior	MH Nakhon Si City	Trang	1–4 (A)	29 October 2023
(Brazil) Douglas Mineiro	Satun	Phuket Andaman	5–1 (H)	19 November 2023
(Brazil) Jefferson Mateus	Phuket Andaman	Trang	0–4 (A)	14 January 2024
(Thailand) Decha Whadtaen	Phatthalung	MH Nakhon Si City	6–1 (H)	3 February 2024
(Thailand) Jehhanafee Mamah	Yala	Nara United	3–0 (H)	25 February 2024

Notes: ^{4} = Player scored 4 goals; (H) = Home team; (A) = Away team

=== Clean sheets ===
As of 24 February 2024.

Rank	Player	Club	Clean sheets
1	(Thailand) Jarudet Ramudth	Songkhla	15
2	(Thailand) Teerapong Puttasukha	Muang Trang United	10
2	(Thailand) Wichaya Ganthong	Phatthalung	10
4	(Thailand) Wuttichai Panbut	Satun	9
4	(Thailand) Firhan Masae	Yala	9

== Attendances ==
=== Overall statistical table ===
Pos	Team	Total	High	Low	Average	Change
1	Pattani	35,705	6,097	1,250	3,246	+87.7%
2	Satun	27,477	3,492	1,448	2,498	n/a
3	Yala	11,468	2,200	495	1,043	+91.4%
4	Phatthalung	11,159	2,000	600	1,014	+98.8%
5	Nara United	9,852	3,200	202	896	+7.4%
6	MH Nakhon Si City	7,351	2,450	0	735	−35.1%
7	Muang Trang United	6,908	1,100	0	691	−11.6%
8	Songkhla	6,600	1,109	219	600	−8.8%
9	Wiang Sa Surat Thani City	3,759	600	0	376	+1.3%
10	Ranong United	2,050	300	0	256	−31.4%
11	Phuket Andaman	2,605	350	130	237	−40.0%
12	Trang	1,999	400	50	182	−51.2%
	League total	126,933	6,097	0	1,007	+49.2%

Updated to games played on 25 February 2024
Source: Thai League

=== Attendances by home match played ===
Team \ Match played	1	2	3	4	5	6	7	8	9	10	11	Total
MH Nakhon Si City	2,450	1,050	875	825	211	550	250	500	320	Unk.4	320	7,351
Muang Trang United	780	800	650	500	450	500	1,100	1,100	500	528	Unk.5	6,908
Nara United	800	1,000	1,100	850	800	500	600	500	3,200	300	202	9,852
Pattani	1,250	2,200	3,000	5,155	3,500	1,500	5,120	2,500	2,533	2,850	6,097	35,705
Phatthalung	700	600	800	1,300	1,500	800	700	850	909	2,000	1,000	11,159
Phuket Andaman	189	326	169	200	300	130	227	267	350	210	237	2,605
Ranong United	200	300	Unk.2	200	300	300	Unk.3	200	300	250	Unk.6	2,050
Satun	1,889	1,639	1,448	2,821	2,578	3,439	2,599	3,492	2,699	2,136	2,737	27,477
Songkhla	745	800	990	257	459	1,109	565	467	321	668	219	6,600
Trang	257	104	250	102	400	186	50	300	100	200	50	1,999
Wiang Sa Surat Thani City	500	550	Unk.1	150	200	400	254	127	600	459	519	3,759
Yala	2,200	1,532	1,063	891	550	515	1,063	1,200	559	495	1,400	11,468

Note:
Unk.1 Some error of T3 official match report 14 October 2023 (Wiang Sa Surat Thani City 0–2 Phatthalung).
Unk.2 Some error of T3 official match report 28 October 2023 (Ranong United 0–8 Songkhla).
Unk.3 Some error of T3 official match report 14 January 2024 (Ranong United 1–3 Muang Trang United).
Unk.4 Some error of T3 official match report 7 February 2024 (MH Nakhon Si City 0–1 Songkhla).
Unk.5 Some error of T3 official match report 17 February 2024 (Muang Trang United 3–0 Phuket Andaman).
Unk.6 Some error of T3 official match report 25 February 2024 (Ranong United 1–5 Phatthalung).
