= 2023–24 Thai League 3 National Championship =

Thai League 3 National Championship
- Season: 2023–24
- Dates: 9 March 2024 – 28 April 2024

The National Championship was the next stage from the regional stage of 2023–24 Thai League 3. The winners and runners-ups of each region would qualify for this round to find 3 clubs promoting to 2024–25 Thai League 2.

== Teams ==
Locations of the 2023–24 Thai League 3 National Championship Teams
Upper Region
Lower Region

Team	Qualifying method
Phitsanulok Unity	Northern region champions
Maejo United	Northern region runners-up
Sisaket United	Northeastern region champions
Mahasarakham SBT	Northeastern region runners-up
Saimit Kabin United	Eastern region champions
Bankhai United	Eastern region runners-up
PTU Pathum Thani	Western region champions
Angthong	Western region runners-up
Songkhla	Southern region champions
Phatthalung	Southern region runners-up
Bangkok	Bangkok metropolitan region champions
North Bangkok University	Bangkok metropolitan region runners-up

Locations of teams in Bangkok Metropolitan region

== Group stage ==
=== Upper region ===
Pos	Team	Pld	W	D	L	GF	GA	GD	Pts	Qualification	SKU	MSK	BKI	KBU	PLU	MJU
1	Sisaket United (P)	5	4	1	0	9	3	+6	13	Qualification to the finals and promotion to the 2024–25 Thai League 2	—	—	2–1	3–0	—	1–0
2	Mahasarakham SBT (O, P)	5	2	2	1	8	7	+1	8	Qualification to the third place play-offs	1–1	—	—	2–1	—	—
3	Bankhai United	5	2	1	2	7	7	0	7		—	1–2	—	—	2–1	—
4	Saimit Kabin United	5	1	2	2	5	8	−3	5		—	—	1–1	—	2–1	1–1
5	Phitsanulok Unity	5	1	1	3	6	8	−2	4		1–2	1–0	—	—	—	2–2
6	Maejo United	5	0	3	2	7	9	−2	3		—	3–3	1–2	—	—	—

Source: Thai League
Rules for classification: 1) Points; 2) Head-to-head points; 3) Goal difference; 4) Goals scored;).
(O) Play-off winners; (P) Promoted
9 March 2024
16:00 UTC+7

Saimit Kabin United	1–1	Bankhai United
Cedrick Platini Kaham 55'	Report; Highlight	Tawan Huntumlay 38'

Nomklao Maharat Stadium,
Kabin Buri, Prachinburi
Attendance: 430
Referee: Chairat Phooalai (Thailand)
9 March 2024
16:00 UTC+7

Maejo United	3–3	Mahasarakham SBT
Thongchai Ampornwiman 10'; Pichai Thongvilas 45+3'; Kongphob Kamasit 87'	Report; Highlight	Júlio Cesar Gomes Romaneli 49', 51', 67'

Stadium of Rajamangala University of Technology Lanna, Doi Saket Campus,
Doi Saket, Chiangmai
Attendance: 253
Referee: Suthipong Teekhasuk (Thailand)
9 March 2024
18:00 UTC+7

Phitsanulok Unity	1–2	Sisaket United
Guilherme Moreira 90' (pen.)	Report; Highlight	Danilo 7'; Wongsakorn Saenruecha 19'

Phitsanulok PAO. Stadium,
Mueang, Phitsanulok
Attendance: 380
Referee: Saravut Suksalee (Thailand)

17 March 2024
16:00 UTC+7

Saimit Kabin United	1–1	Maejo United
Jettarin Phetborisut 81'	Report; Highlight	Tatsuhide Shimizu 90+4'

Nomklao Maharat Stadium,
Kabin Buri, Prachinburi
Attendance: 500
Referee: Thapana Thaworn (Thailand)
17 March 2024
17:00 UTC+7

Sisaket United	2–1	Bankhai United
Danilo 27', 59'	Report; Highlight	Sitthinon Ketkaew 72'

Sri Nakhon Lamduan Stadium,
Mueang, Sisaket
Attendance: 1,990
Referee: Amnat Rattanapakdee (Thailand)
17 March 2024
18:00 UTC+7

Phitsanulok Unity	1–0	Mahasarakham SBT
Premsak Chantum 28'	Report; Highlight

Phitsanulok PAO. Stadium,
Mueang, Phitsanulok
Attendance: 374
Referee: Arun Budtasee (Thailand)

23 March 2024
17:00 UTC+7

Sisaket United	1–0	Maejo United
Panigazzi Matías Ignacio 80'	Report; Highlight

Sri Nakhon Lamduan Stadium,
Mueang, Sisaket
Attendance: 2,011
Referee: Nararit Srivorakul (Thailand)
23 March 2024
18:00 UTC+7

Mahasarakham SBT	2–1	Saimit Kabin United
Evson Patrício 45', 58'	Report; Highlight	Surachet Khunnu 61'

Mahasarakham Provincial Stadium,
Mueang, Mahasarakham
Attendance: 1,244
Referee: Weeraphong Chaiyasuk (Thailand)
23 March 2024
18:00 UTC+7

Bankhai United	2–1	Phitsanulok Unity
Burnel Okana-Stazi 54', 88'	Report; Highlight	Anucha Phantong 75'

Wai Krong Stadium,
Ban Khai, Rayong
Attendance: 365
Referee: Nattaphak Sawasdee (Thailand)

31 March 2024
16:00 UTC+7

Saimit Kabin United	2–1	Phitsanulok Unity
Surachet Khunnu 14'; Abner Gomes Faria 43'	Report; Highlight	Nuttasit Choosai 68'

Nomklao Maharat Stadium,
Kabin Buri, Prachinburi
Attendance: 344
Referee: Patiyut Monthianart (Thailand)
31 March 2024
16:00 UTC+7

Maejo United	1–2	Bankhai United
Koki Narita 69' (pen.)	Report; Highlight	Ranieri Luiz Barbosa 72'; Burnel Okana-Stazi 83'

Stadium of Rajamangala University of Technology Lanna, Doi Saket Campus,
Doi Saket, Chiangmai
Attendance: 250
Referee: Yuttana Sadkrathok (Thailand)
31 March 2024
18:00 UTC+7

Mahasarakham SBT	1–1	Sisaket United
Júlio Cesar Gomes Romaneli 43' (pen.)	Report; Highlight	Phattharapong Phengchaem 60'

Mahasarakham Provincial Stadium,
Mueang, Mahasarakham
Attendance: 1,629
Referee: Kriangkrai Thiphanunjarukorn (Thailand)

6 April 2024
17:00 UTC+7

Sisaket United	3–0	Saimit Kabin United
Isaac Honore Aime Mbengan 5'; Danilo 10'; Panigazzi Matías Ignacio 43'	Report; Highlight

Sri Nakhon Lamduan Stadium,
Mueang, Sisaket
Attendance: 2,220
Referee: Suthipong Teekhasuk (Thailand)
6 April 2024
17:00 UTC+7

Phitsanulok Unity	2–2	Maejo United
Pissanu Sibutta 11'; Anucha Phantong 74'	Report; Highlight	Koki Narita 7'; Ritthidet Phensawat 45+3'

Phitsanulok PAO. Stadium,
Mueang, Phitsanulok
Attendance: 110
Referee: Palathip Homwarn (Thailand)
6 April 2024
17:00 UTC+7

Bankhai United	1–2	Mahasarakham SBT
Burnel Okana-Stazi 71'	Report; Highlight	Nattapon Thaptanon 18'; Leandro Assumpção 47'

Wai Krong Stadium,
Ban Khai, Rayong
Attendance: 1,099
Referee: Poowasak Sukunt (Thailand)

=== Lower region ===
Pos	Team	Pld	W	D	L	GF	GA	GD	Pts	Qualification	BKK	PLG	NBU	SKA	PTU	ATG
1	Bangkok (C, P)	5	3	2	0	9	4	+5	11	Qualification to the finals and promotion to the 2024–25 Thai League 2	—	—	1–0	2–2	—	3–0
2	Phatthalung	5	2	2	1	8	6	+2	8	Qualification to the third place play-offs	1–2	—	—	—	3–1	—
3	North Bangkok University	5	1	3	1	7	6	+1	6 (Note: The head-to-head record and overall goals difference are tied; North Bangkok University 1 pt (overall GD +1), Songkhla 1 pt (overall GD +1). North Bangkok University is ahead on the overall goals scored.)		—	2–2	—	—	—	4–2
4	Songkhla	5	1	3	1	6	5	+1	6		—	0–0	1–1	—	2–0	—
5	PTU Pathum Thani	5	1	2	2	6	8	−2	5		1–1	—	0–0	—	—	4–2
6	Angthong	5	1	0	4	7	14	−7	3		—	1–2	—	2–1	—	—

Source: Thai League
Rules for classification: 1) Points; 2) Head-to-head points; 3) Goal difference; 4) Goals scored;).
(C) Champions; (P) Promoted
Notes:
10 March 2024
16:00 UTC+7

North Bangkok University	2–2	Phatthalung
Veeraphong Aon-pean 17'; Kim Seong-soo 35'	Report; Highlight	Osvaldo Nascimento dos Santos Neto 27'; Jhonatan Bernardo 73'

Stadium of North Bangkok University,
Thanyaburi, Pathum Thani
Attendance: 330
Referee: Kittichai Huthip (Thailand)
10 March 2024
18:00 UTC+7

Bangkok	3–0	Angthong
Supakorn Nutvijit 9'; Seiya Kojima 51', 78'	Report; Highlight

72nd Anniversary Stadium, Bang Mot,
Thung Khru, Bangkok
Attendance: 1,768
Referee: Matoha Sayo (Thailand)
10 March 2024
18:00 UTC+7

Songkhla	2–0	PTU Pathum Thani
Aliu Micheal Abdul 26'; Abdulhafis Nibu 69'	Report; Highlight

Tinsulanon Stadium,
Mueang, Songkhla
Attendance: 812
Referee: Pichit Thongjanmoon (Thailand)

16 March 2024
16:00 UTC+7

PTU Pathum Thani	4–2	Angthong
Bundit Paponpai 21'; Woraphon Waeokhao 45+1', 58'; Eric Kumi 89'	Report; Highlight	Sarawut Munjit 30'; Kouassi Yao Hermann 85'

Ratchakram Stadium,
Bang Sai, Phra Nakhon Si Ayutthaya
Attendance: 225
Referee: Theerapon Nakthong (Thailand)
16 March 2024
18:00 UTC+7

Songkhla	0–0	Phatthalung
	Report; Highlight

Tinsulanon Stadium,
Mueang, Songkhla
Attendance: 987
Referee: Danai Yommool (Thailand)
16 March 2024
18:00 UTC+7

Bangkok	1–0	North Bangkok University
Banjong Phadungpattanodom 6'	Report; Highlight

72nd Anniversary Stadium, Bang Mot,
Thung Khru, Bangkok
Attendance: 1,293
Referee: Saravut Suksalee (Thailand)

24 March 2024
16:00 UTC+7

PTU Pathum Thani	0–0	North Bangkok University
	Report; Highlight

Ratchakram Stadium,
Bang Sai, Phra Nakhon Si Ayutthaya
Attendance: 227
Referee: Palathip Homwarn (Thailand)
24 March 2024
18:00 UTC+7

Phatthalung	1–2	Bangkok
Jhonatan Bernardo 37' (pen.)	Report; Highlight	Seiya Kojima 63'; Woraphot Somsang 67'

Phatthalung PAO. Stadium,
Mueang, Phatthalung
Attendance: 3,545
Referee: Chayapol Laosuphan (Thailand)
24 March 2024
18:00 UTC+7

Angthong	2–1	Songkhla
Kamol Phothong 51'; Patiphan Panneangpech 88'	Report; Highlight	Anwa A-leemama 38'

Angthong Provincial Stadium,
Mueang, Angthong
Attendance: 976
Referee: Wicharn Klinthaworn (Thailand)

30 March 2024
16:00 UTC+7

North Bangkok University	4–2	Angthong
Chinnawat Pasuk 2'; Pheemphapob Viriyachanchai 45+5'; Veeraphong Aon-pean 56', 90+2'	Report; Highlight	Patiphan Panneangpech 51' (pen.); Phatsakorn Buasuwan 81'

Stadium of North Bangkok University,
Thanyaburi, Pathum Thani
Attendance: 206
Referee: Chitchanuphong Ketsana (Thailand)
30 March 2024
18:00 UTC+7

Bangkok	2–2	Songkhla
Phattharaphol Khamsuk 18'; Sakda Koomgun 69'	Report; Highlight	Abdulhafis Nibu 5'; Sitthichai Chimrueang 81'

72nd Anniversary Stadium, Bang Mot,
Thung Khru, Bangkok
Attendance: 1,327
Referee: Wirot Oupachit (Thailand)
30 March 2024
18:00 UTC+7

Phatthalung	3–1	PTU Pathum Thani
Jhonatan Bernardo 15'; Kongpop Artserm 72'; Osvaldo Nascimento dos Santos Neto 75'	Report; Highlight	Eric Kumi 64'

Phatthalung PAO. Stadium,
Mueang, Phatthalung
Attendance: 1,850
Referee: Pichit Thongjanmoon (Thailand)

7 April 2024
16:00 UTC+7

Songkhla	1–1	North Bangkok University
Adam Lassamano 87'	Report; Highlight	Mohamed Kouadio 22'

Tinsulanon Stadium,
Mueang, Songkhla
Attendance: 2,655
Referee: Jirawit Phonkaew (Thailand)
7 April 2024
16:00 UTC+7

PTU Pathum Thani	1–1	Bangkok
Eric Kumi 23'	Report; Highlight	Wachirawut Phudithip 52' (pen.)

Ratchakram Stadium,
Bang Sai, Phra Nakhon Si Ayutthaya
Attendance:
Referee: Wichate Tainthong (Thailand)
7 April 2024
16:00 UTC+7

Angthong	1–2	Phatthalung
Kouassi Yao Hermann 66'	Report; Highlight	Thapkhon Markmee 52'; Kongpop Artserm 90+2'

Angthong Provincial Stadium,
Mueang, Angthong
Attendance: 814
Referee: Ekkachai Phetcham (Thailand)

== Knockout stage ==
Winners, runners-up, and third place of 2023–24 Thai League 3 would be promoted to the 2024–25 Thai League 2.

=== Third place play-offs ===
==== Summary ====
Team 1	Agg.	Team 2	1st leg	2nd leg
Mahasarakham SBT	3–2	Phatthalung	2–0	1–2

==== Matches ====
20 April 2024
18:00 UTC+7

Mahasarakham SBT	2–0	Phatthalung
Teerapak Punboonchu 20'; Leandro Assumpção 86'	Report; Highlight

Mahasarakham Provincial Stadium,
Mueang, Mahasarakham
Attendance: 2,122
Referee: Komgrit Ponpasit (Thailand)
27 April 2024
18:00 UTC+7

Phatthalung	2–1	Mahasarakham SBT
Thapkhon Markmee 22'; Osvaldo Nascimento dos Santos Neto 90'	Report; Highlight	Evson Patrício 52'

Phatthalung PAO. Stadium,
Mueang, Phatthalung
Attendance: 2,550
Referee: Thapakorn Thongkon (Thailand)

Mahasarakham SBT won 3–2 on aggregate.

=== Finals ===
==== Summary ====
Team 1	Agg.	Team 2	1st leg	2nd leg
Sisaket United	2–3	Bangkok	1–1	1–2

==== Matches ====
===== 1st leg =====
21 April 2024
17:00 UTC+7

Sisaket United	1–1	Bangkok
Pakornkiat Kaena 71'	Report; Highlight	Wichaya Pornprasart 59'

Sri Nakhon Lamduan Stadium,
Mueang, Sisaket
Attendance: 3,191
Referee: Samrit Ritkaew (Thailand)

Sisaket United	Bangkok

Lineups:
GK	18	(Thailand) Adisak Lambelsah
CB	6	(Thailand) Piyanath Chanrum
CB	5	(Thailand) Pakornkiat Kaena	71'	(yellow card) 83'
CB	38	(Thailand) Heman Kittiamphaipruek
RM	77	(Thailand) Pongsak Boonthot (c)
CM	52	(Thailand) Sutee Chantorn		(yellow card) 38'
CM	32	(Argentina) Panigazzi Matías Ignacio
LM	72	(Thailand) Pisek Soontonwat			(substituted off) 69'
RF	7	(Thailand) Wongsakorn Saenruecha
CF	9	(Brazil) Danilo
LF	10	(Cameroon) Isaac Honore Aime Mbengan			(substituted off) 90'
Substitutes:
GK	25	(Thailand) Rapeepat Nasoongchon
DF	23	(Thailand) Khritmat Sompen
DF	35	(Thailand) Wanthana Chaisawan
MF	4	(Thailand) Kittiphop Taewsawaeng
MF	11	(Thailand) Phattharapong Phengchaem			(substituted in) 69'
MF	17	(Thailand) Witthaya Kantong
MF	37	(Thailand) Nitipat Kansorn
MF	47	(Thailand) Nonthawat Chaotai			(substituted in) 90'
MF	79	(Thailand) Tiwa Piwsai
Head Coach:
(Thailand) Narongthanaphon Choeithaisongchodok

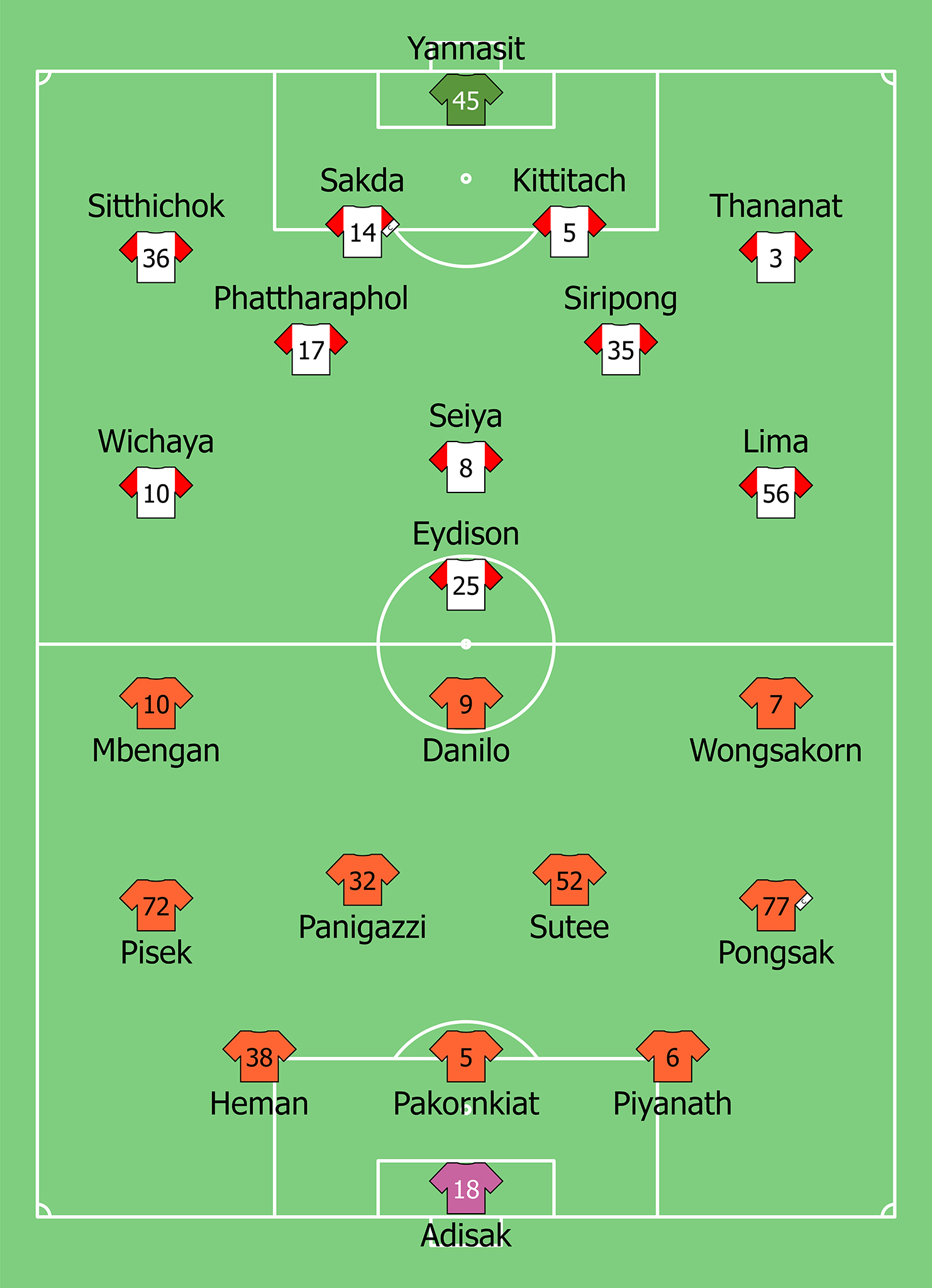

Lineups:
GK	45	(Thailand) Yannasit Sukcharoen
RB	36	(Thailand) Sitthichok Mool-on
CB	14	(Thailand) Sakda Koomgun (c)		(yellow card) 33'
CB	5	(Thailand) Kittitach Pranithi
LB	3	(Thailand) Thananat Rungrampan		(yellow card) 52'	(substituted off) 69'
DM	17	(Thailand) Phattharaphol Khamsuk
DM	35	(Thailand) Siripong Kongjaopha
RM	10	(Thailand) Wichaya Pornprasart	59'		(substituted off) 89'
CM	8	(Japan) Seiya Kojima			(substituted off) 79'
LM	56	(Brazil) Carlos Eduardo		(yellow card) 87'
CF	25	(Brazil) Eydison
Substitutes:
GK	99	(Thailand) Natthasan Pakkarano
DF	26	(Thailand) Supakorn Nutvijit			(substituted in) 69'
DF	37	(Thailand) Phubordee Buangam
MF	19	(Thailand) Wachirawut Phudithip			(substituted in) 89'
MF	24	(Thailand) Rattapoom Lonlue
MF	34	(Thailand) Napat Tangthanapholkul
FW	11	(Thailand) Phootran Gingpan			(substituted in) 79'
FW	22	(Thailand) Sirodom Konsungnoen
FW	23	(Thailand) Kiangsak Taobutr
Head Coach:
(Thailand) Kissakorn Krasaingoen

===== 2nd leg =====
28 April 2024
18:00 UTC+7

Bangkok	2–1	Sisaket United
Sakda Koomgun 30'; Wichaya Pornprasart 74'	Report; Highlight; Ceremony	Danilo 70'

72nd Anniversary Stadium, Bang Mot,
Thung Khru, Bangkok
Attendance: 5,276
Referee: Sila Jinnigorn (Thailand)

Bangkok	Sisaket United

Lineups:
GK	45	(Thailand) Yannasit Sukcharoen			(substituted off) 46'
RB	36	(Thailand) Sitthichok Mool-on
CB	14	(Thailand) Sakda Koomgun (c)	30'
CB	5	(Thailand) Kittitach Pranithi		(yellow card) 90+6'
LB	3	(Thailand) Thananat Rungrampan
DM	17	(Thailand) Phattharaphol Khamsuk
DM	35	(Thailand) Siripong Kongjaopha		(yellow card) 45+2'
RM	10	(Thailand) Wichaya Pornprasart	74'		(substituted off) 90+5'
CM	8	(Japan) Seiya Kojima			(substituted off) 61'
LM	56	(Brazil) Carlos Eduardo		(yellow card) 42'	(substituted off) 90+5'
CF	25	(Brazil) Eydison		(yellow card) 57'	(substituted off) 90'
Substitutes:
GK	99	(Thailand) Natthasan Pakkarano			(substituted in) 46'
DF	4	(Thailand) Banjong Phadungpattanodom			(substituted in) 90+5'
DF	26	(Thailand) Supakorn Nutvijit
DF	37	(Thailand) Phubordee Buangam
MF	24	(Thailand) Rattapoom Lonlue			(substituted in) 61'
MF	34	(Thailand) Napat Tangthanapholkul
FW	9	(Thailand) Woraphot Somsang			(substituted in) 90+5'
FW	11	(Thailand) Phootran Gingpan			(substituted in) 90'
FW	22	(Thailand) Sirodom Konsungnoen
Head Coach:
(Thailand) Kissakorn Krasaingoen

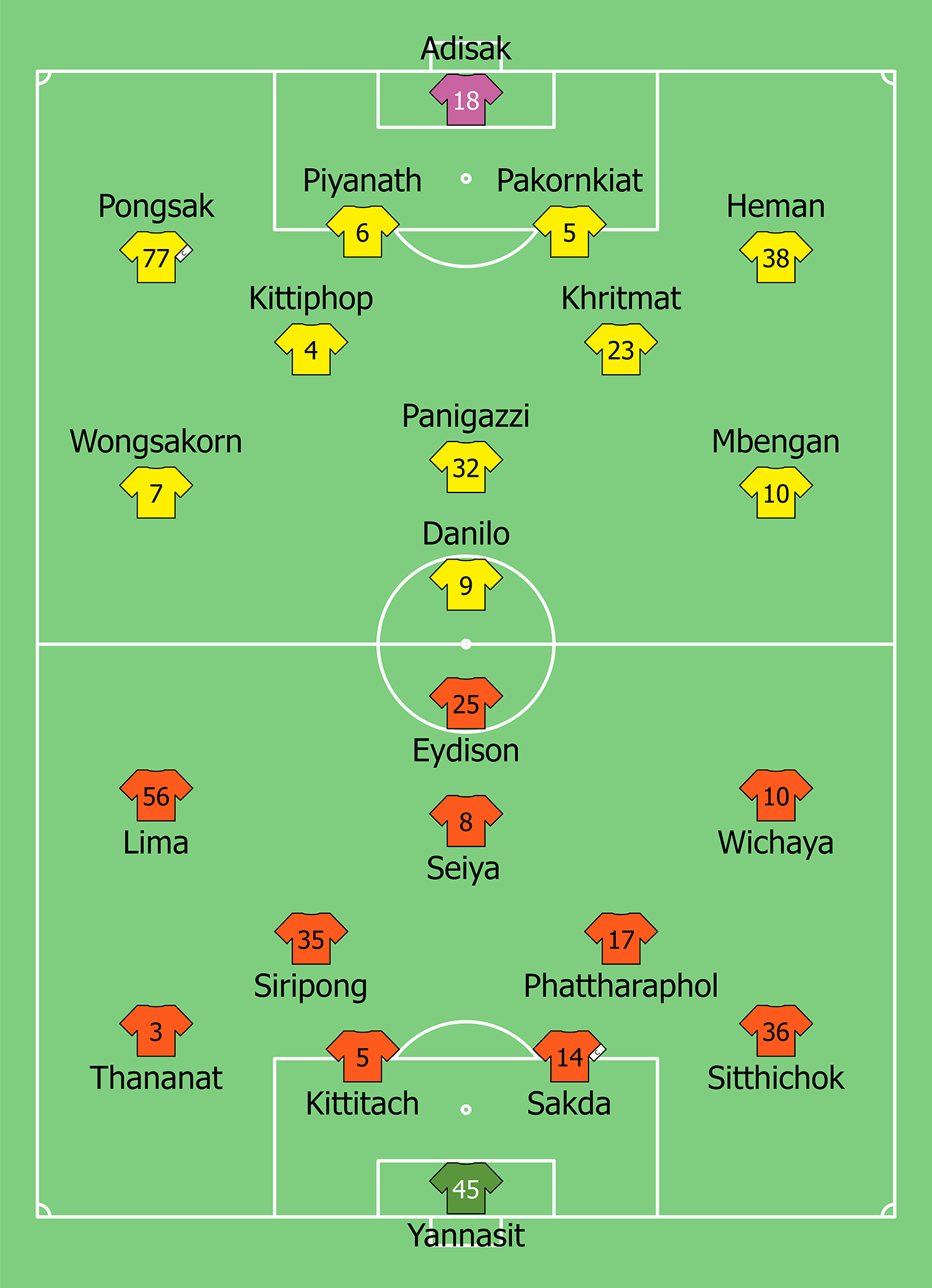

Lineups:
GK	18	(Thailand) Adisak Lambelsah
RB	77	(Thailand) Pongsak Boonthot (c)
CB	6	(Thailand) Piyanath Chanrum
CB	5	(Thailand) Pakornkiat Kaena
LB	38	(Thailand) Heman Kittiamphaipruek
DM	4	(Thailand) Kittiphop Taewsawaeng
DM	23	(Thailand) Khritmat Sompen			(substituted off) 46'
RM	7	(Thailand) Wongsakorn Saenruecha		(yellow card) 54'	(substituted off) 80'
AM	32	(Argentina) Panigazzi Matías Ignacio			(substituted off) 90+3'
LM	10	(Cameroon) Isaac Honore Aime Mbengan			(substituted off) 90+3'
CF	9	(Brazil) Danilo	70'
Substitutes:
GK	25	(Thailand) Rapeepat Nasoongchon
DF	3	(Thailand) Kritsada Utamakun
DF	35	(Thailand) Wanthana Chaisawan
MF	11	(Thailand) Phattharapong Phengchaem			(substituted in) 80'
MF	16	(Thailand) Chatchai Boonnuk			(substituted in) 90+3'
MF	17	(Thailand) Witthaya Kantong
MF	37	(Thailand) Nitipat Kansorn			(substituted in) 90+3'
MF	47	(Thailand) Nonthawat Chaotai
MF	79	(Thailand) Tiwa Piwsai		(yellow card) 79'	(substituted in) 46'
Head Coach:
(Thailand) Narongthanaphon Choeithaisongchodok

Bangkok won 3–2 on aggregate.

== Statistics ==
=== Goalscorers ===
There were 95 goals scored in 34 matches, for an average of 2.79 goals per match.

5 goals

- (Brazil) Danilo (Sisaket United)

4 goals

- (Republic of the Congo) Burnel Okana-Stazi (Bankhai United)
- (Brazil) Júlio Cesar Gomes Romaneli (Mahasarakham SBT)

3 goals

- (Japan) Seiya Kojima (Bangkok)
- (Brazil) Evson Patrício (Mahasarakham SBT)
- (Thailand) Veeraphong Aon-pean (North Bangkok University)
- (Brazil) Jhonatan Bernardo (Phatthalung)
- (Brazil) Osvaldo Nascimento dos Santos Neto (Phatthalung)
- (Ghana) Eric Kumi (PTU Pathum Thani)

2 goals

- (Ivory Coast) Kouassi Yao Hermann (Angthong)
- (Thailand) Patiphan Panneangpech (Angthong)
- (Thailand) Sakda Koomgun (Bangkok)
- (Thailand) Wichaya Pornprasart (Bangkok)
- (Japan) Koki Narita (Maejo United)
- (Brazil) Leandro Assumpção (Mahasarakham SBT)
- (Thailand) Kongpop Artserm (Phatthalung)
- (Thailand) Thapkhon Markmee (Phatthalung)
- (Thailand) Anucha Phantong (Phitsanulok Unity)
- (Thailand) Woraphon Waeokhao (PTU Pathum Thani)
- (Thailand) Surachet Khunnu (Saimit Kabin United)
- (Argentina) Panigazzi Matías Ignacio (Sisaket United)
- (Thailand) Abdulhafis Nibu (Songkhla)

1 goal

- (Thailand) Kamol Phothong (Angthong)
- (Thailand) Phatsakorn Buasuwan (Angthong)
- (Thailand) Sarawut Munjit (Angthong)
- (Thailand) Banjong Phadungpattanodom (Bangkok)
- (Thailand) Phattharaphol Khamsuk (Bangkok)
- (Thailand) Supakorn Nutvijit (Bangkok)
- (Thailand) Wachirawut Phudithip (Bangkok)
- (Thailand) Woraphot Somsang (Bangkok)
- (Brazil) Ranieri Luiz Barbosa (Bankhai United)
- (Thailand) Sitthinon Ketkaew (Bankhai United)
- (Thailand) Tawan Huntumlay (Bankhai United)
- (Thailand) Kongphob Kamasit (Maejo United)
- (Thailand) Pichai Thongvilas (Maejo United)
- (Thailand) Ritthidet Phensawat (Maejo United)
- (Japan) Tatsuhide Shimizu (Maejo United)
- (Thailand) Thongchai Ampornwiman (Maejo United)
- (Thailand) Nattapon Thaptanon (Mahasarakham SBT)
- (Thailand) Teerapak Punboonchu (Mahasarakham SBT)
- (Thailand) Chinnawat Pasuk (North Bangkok University)
- (South Korea) Kim Seong-soo (North Bangkok University)
- (Ivory Coast) Mohamed Kouadio (North Bangkok University)
- (Thailand) Pheemphapob Viriyachanchai (North Bangkok University)
- (Brazil) Guilherme Moreira (Phitsanulok Unity)
- (Thailand) Nuttasit Choosai (Phitsanulok Unity)
- (Thailand) Pissanu Sibutta (Phitsanulok Unity)
- (Thailand) Premsak Chantum (Phitsanulok Unity)
- (Thailand) Bundit Paponpai (PTU Pathum Thani)
- (Brazil) Abner Gomes Faria (Saimit Kabin United)
- (Cameroon) Cedrick Platini Kaham (Saimit Kabin United)
- (Thailand) Jettarin Phetborisut (Saimit Kabin United)
- (Cameroon) Isaac Honore Aime Mbengan (Sisaket United)
- (Thailand) Pakornkiat Kaena (Sisaket United)
- (Thailand) Phattharapong Phengchaem (Sisaket United)
- (Thailand) Wongsakorn Saenruecha (Sisaket United)
- (Thailand) Adam Lassamano (Songkhla)
- (Nigeria) Aliu Micheal Abdul (Songkhla)
- (Thailand) Anwa A-leemama (Songkhla)
- (Thailand) Sitthichai Chimrueang (Songkhla)

Source: Thai League

== Teams promoted to 2024–25 Thai League 2 ==
- Bangkok (champions)
- Sisaket United (runners-up)
- Mahasarakham SBT (third-placed)
