= 2023–24 Thai League 3 =

7th season of the Thai League 3

- Season: 2023–24
- Dates: 16 September 2023 – 28 April 2024
- Champions: Bangkok
- Promoted: Bangkok; Sisaket United; Mahasarakham SBT
- Relegated: Rongseemaechaithanachotiwat Phayao; Kongkrailas United; Nakhon Ratchasima United; Chanthaburi United; Prachinburi City; Chainat United; MH Nakhon Si City; Trang; The iCon RSU

The 2023–24 Thai League 3 is the seventh season of the Thai League 3, the third-tier professional league for association football clubs in Thailand, since its establishment in 2017, also known as Rising Sun Fertilizer League due to the sponsorship deal with Rising Sun fertilizer. A total of 72 teams would be divided into 6 regions including 11 teams in the Northern region, 13 teams in the Northeastern region, 11 teams in the Eastern region, 11 teams in the Western region, 12 teams in the Southern region, and 14 teams in the Bangkok metropolitan region.

== Regional stage ==
The number of teams in 6 regions including 11 teams in the Northern region, 13 teams in the Northeastern region, 11 teams in the Eastern region, 11 teams in the Western region, 12 teams in the Southern region, and 14 teams in the Bangkok metropolitan region.

=== Northern region ===
League table

| Pos | Team | Pld | W | D | L | GF | GA | GD | Pts | Qualification or relegation |
|---|---|---|---|---|---|---|---|---|---|---|
| 1 | Phitsanulok Unity (C, Q) | 20 | 12 | 7 | 1 | 33 | 18 | +15 | 43 | Qualification to the National Championship stage |
| 2 | Maejo United (Q) | 20 | 11 | 7 | 2 | 36 | 17 | +19 | 40 | Qualification to the National Championship stage |
| 3 | Phitsanulok | 20 | 10 | 8 | 2 | 43 | 22 | +21 | 38 | |
| 4 | Rongseemaechaithanachotiwat Phayao (R) | 20 | 8 | 7 | 5 | 28 | 24 | +4 | 31 | Relegation to the Thailand Semi-pro League (Note: Rongseemaechaithanachotiwat Phayao and Kongkrailas United were administratively relegated to the 2025 Thailand Semi-pro League for failing to meet club licensing standards.) |
| 5 | Northern Nakhon Mae Sot United | 20 | 5 | 8 | 7 | 23 | 28 | −5 | 23 | |
| 6 | Uttaradit Saksiam | 20 | 5 | 7 | 8 | 24 | 26 | −2 | 22 (Note: Uttaradit Saksiam ahead on head-to-head points record; Uttaradit Saksiam 6 pts, Kongkrailas United 0 pts.) | |
| 7 | Kongkrailas United (R) | 20 | 6 | 4 | 10 | 29 | 45 | −16 | 22 | Relegation to the Thailand Semi-pro League |
| 8 | Khelang United | 20 | 5 | 6 | 9 | 17 | 26 | −9 | 21 | |
| 9 | Kamphaengphet | 20 | 4 | 7 | 9 | 17 | 24 | −7 | 19 | |
| 10 | Chiangrai City | 20 | 5 | 3 | 12 | 23 | 30 | −7 | 18 | |
| 11 | Nakhon Sawan See Khwae City (Note: Nakhon Sawan See Khwae City remained in the league after Rongseemaechaithanachotiwat Phayao and Kongkrailas United failed to meet the club licensing criteria for the 2024–25 season, resulting in Nakhon Sawan See Khwae City retaining their spot.) | 20 | 3 | 8 | 9 | 13 | 26 | −13 | 17 | |

Source: Thai League
Rules for classification: 1) Points; 2) Head-to-head points; 3) Head-to-head goal difference; 4) Head-to-head goal scored; 5) Overall goal difference; 6) Overall goal scored; 7) Fair play points; 8) Play-off without extra time).
(C) Champions; (Q) Qualified for the phase indicated; (R) Relegated

=== Northeastern region ===
League table

| Pos | Team | Pld | W | D | L | GF | GA | GD | Pts | Qualification or relegation |
|---|---|---|---|---|---|---|---|---|---|---|
| 1 | Sisaket United (C, Q) | 24 | 16 | 8 | 0 | 42 | 7 | +35 | 56 | Qualification to the National Championship stage |
| 2 | Mahasarakham SBT (Q) | 24 | 16 | 6 | 2 | 68 | 26 | +42 | 54 | Qualification to the National Championship stage |
| 3 | Surin City | 24 | 14 | 2 | 8 | 38 | 26 | +12 | 44 (Note: Surin City ahead on head-to-head points record; Surin City 6 pts, Udon United 0 pts.) | |
| 4 | Udon United | 24 | 12 | 8 | 4 | 55 | 23 | +32 | 44 | |
| 5 | Khon Kaen | 24 | 12 | 7 | 5 | 29 | 19 | +10 | 43 | |
| 6 | Ubon Kruanapat | 24 | 11 | 7 | 6 | 42 | 21 | +21 | 40 | |
| 7 | Muang Loei United | 24 | 11 | 6 | 7 | 43 | 33 | +10 | 39 | |
| 8 | Khon Kaen Mordindang | 24 | 7 | 7 | 10 | 34 | 44 | −10 | 28 | |
| 9 | Rasisalai United | 24 | 6 | 7 | 11 | 41 | 38 | +3 | 25 | |
| 10 | Suranaree Black Cat | 24 | 7 | 3 | 14 | 33 | 41 | −8 | 24 | |
| 11 | Yasothon | 24 | 6 | 2 | 16 | 21 | 50 | −29 | 20 | |
| 12 | Surin Khong Chee Mool | 24 | 3 | 3 | 18 | 20 | 85 | −65 | 12 | |
| 13 | Nakhon Ratchasima United (R) | 24 | 1 | 2 | 21 | 19 | 72 | −53 | 5 | Relegation to the Thailand Semi-pro League |

Source: Thai League
Rules for classification: 1) Points; 2) Head-to-head points; 3) Head-to-head goal difference; 4) Head-to-head goal scored; 5) Overall goal difference; 6) Overall goal scored; 7) Fair play points; 8) Play-off without extra time).
(C) Champions; (Q) Qualified for the phase indicated; (R) Relegated

=== Eastern region ===
League table

| Pos | Team | Pld | W | D | L | GF | GA | GD | Pts | Qualification or relegation |
|---|---|---|---|---|---|---|---|---|---|---|
| 1 | Saimit Kabin United (C, Q) | 20 | 13 | 4 | 3 | 23 | 7 | +16 | 43 | Qualification to the National Championship stage |
| 2 | Bankhai United (Q) | 20 | 13 | 3 | 4 | 30 | 14 | +16 | 42 | Qualification to the National Championship stage |
| 3 | Pluakdaeng United | 20 | 9 | 7 | 4 | 36 | 20 | +16 | 34 | |
| 4 | Navy | 20 | 7 | 7 | 6 | 38 | 20 | +18 | 28 | |
| 5 | Chachoengsao Hi-Tek | 20 | 7 | 5 | 8 | 28 | 22 | +6 | 26 | |
| 6 | Chanthaburi United (R) | 20 | 7 | 4 | 9 | 21 | 21 | 0 | 25 | Relegation to the Thailand Semi-pro League (Note: Chanthaburi United was administratively relegated to the 2025 Thailand Semi-pro League for failing to meet club licensing standards.) |
| 7 | Fleet | 20 | 5 | 9 | 6 | 24 | 26 | −2 | 24 (Note: The head-to-head record is tied; Fleet 2 pts (GD 0), BFB Pattaya City 2 pts (GD 0). Fleet is ahead on the overall goals difference.) | |
| 8 | BFB Pattaya City | 20 | 6 | 6 | 8 | 23 | 28 | −5 | 24 | |
| 9 | Marines | 20 | 5 | 8 | 7 | 17 | 32 | −15 | 23 | |
| 10 | ACDC | 20 | 4 | 7 | 9 | 15 | 32 | −17 | 19 | |
| 11 | Prachinburi City (R) | 20 | 3 | 2 | 15 | 9 | 42 | −33 | 11 | Relegation to the Thailand Semi-pro League |

Source: Thai League
Rules for classification: 1) Points; 2) Head-to-head points; 3) Head-to-head goal difference; 4) Head-to-head goal scored; 5) Overall goal difference; 6) Overall goal scored; 7) Fair play points; 8) Play-off without extra time).
(C) Champions; (Q) Qualified for the phase indicated; (R) Relegated

=== Western region ===
League table

| Pos | Team | Pld | W | D | L | GF | GA | GD | Pts | Qualification or relegation |
|---|---|---|---|---|---|---|---|---|---|---|
| 1 | PTU Pathum Thani (C, Q) | 20 | 12 | 6 | 2 | 51 | 16 | +35 | 42 | Qualification to the National Championship stage |
| 2 | Angthong (Q) | 20 | 12 | 4 | 4 | 42 | 20 | +22 | 40 (Note: Angthong ahead on head-to-head points record; Angthong 4 pts, Rajpracha 1 pt.) | Qualification to the National Championship stage |
| 3 | Rajpracha | 20 | 11 | 7 | 2 | 41 | 15 | +26 | 40 | |
| 4 | Saraburi United | 20 | 11 | 3 | 6 | 39 | 22 | +17 | 36 | |
| 5 | Lopburi City | 20 | 10 | 4 | 6 | 35 | 16 | +19 | 34 | |
| 6 | Kanchanaburi City | 20 | 8 | 8 | 4 | 31 | 17 | +14 | 32 | |
| 7 | Maraleina | 20 | 6 | 9 | 5 | 40 | 20 | +20 | 27 | |
| 8 | Thap Luang United | 20 | 6 | 4 | 10 | 20 | 27 | −7 | 22 | |
| 9 | Assumption United | 20 | 5 | 4 | 11 | 24 | 35 | −11 | 19 | |
| 10 | Hua Hin City | 20 | 4 | 1 | 15 | 24 | 38 | −14 | 13 | |
| 11 | Chainat United (R) | 20 | 0 | 0 | 20 | 5 | 126 | −121 | 0 | Relegation to the Thailand Semi-pro League |

Source: Thai League
Rules for classification: 1) Points; 2) Head-to-head points; 3) Head-to-head goal difference; 4) Head-to-head goal scored; 5) Overall goal difference; 6) Overall goal scored; 7) Fair play points; 8) Play-off without extra time).
(C) Champions; (Q) Qualified for the phase indicated; (R) Relegated

=== Southern region ===
League table

| Pos | Team | Pld | W | D | L | GF | GA | GD | Pts | Qualification or relegation |
|---|---|---|---|---|---|---|---|---|---|---|
| 1 | Songkhla (C, Q) | 22 | 17 | 5 | 0 | 46 | 7 | +39 | 56 | Qualification to the National Championship stage |
| 2 | Phatthalung (Q) | 22 | 14 | 6 | 2 | 56 | 15 | +41 | 48 | Qualification to the National Championship stage |
| 3 | Pattani | 22 | 13 | 4 | 5 | 45 | 24 | +21 | 43 | |
| 4 | Satun | 22 | 10 | 6 | 6 | 27 | 19 | +8 | 36 | |
| 5 | Muang Trang United | 22 | 9 | 6 | 7 | 24 | 18 | +6 | 33 | |
| 6 | Wiang Sa Surat Thani City | 22 | 10 | 2 | 10 | 31 | 32 | −1 | 32 | |
| 7 | Nara United | 22 | 9 | 4 | 9 | 25 | 25 | 0 | 31 | |
| 8 | Yala | 22 | 5 | 8 | 9 | 14 | 20 | −6 | 23 | |
| 9 | Phuket Andaman | 22 | 6 | 3 | 13 | 23 | 35 | −12 | 21 | |
| 10 | MH Nakhon Si City (R) | 22 | 4 | 5 | 13 | 21 | 35 | −14 | 17 | Relegation to the Thailand Semi-pro League (Note: MH Nakhon Si City was administratively relegated to the 2025 Thailand Semi-pro League for failing to meet club licensing standards.) |
| 11 | Ranong United | 22 | 3 | 6 | 13 | 14 | 46 | −32 | 15 | |
| 12 | Trang (R) | 22 | 3 | 3 | 16 | 8 | 58 | −50 | 12 | Relegation to the Thailand Semi-pro League |

Source: Thai League
Rules for classification: 1) Points; 2) Head-to-head points; 3) Head-to-head goal difference; 4) Head-to-head goal scored; 5) Overall goal difference; 6) Overall goal scored; 7) Fair play points; 8) Play-off without extra time).
(C) Champions; (Q) Qualified for the phase indicated; (R) Relegated

=== Bangkok Metropolitan region ===
League table

| Pos | Team | Pld | W | D | L | GF | GA | GD | Pts | Qualification or relegation |
|---|---|---|---|---|---|---|---|---|---|---|
| 1 | Bangkok (C, Q) | 26 | 18 | 7 | 1 | 59 | 19 | +40 | 61 | Qualification to the National Championship stage |
| 2 | North Bangkok University (Q) | 26 | 17 | 6 | 3 | 44 | 17 | +27 | 57 | Qualification to the National Championship stage |
| 3 | Samut Sakhon City | 26 | 17 | 5 | 4 | 65 | 21 | +44 | 56 (Note: Samut Sakhon City ahead on head-to-head points record; Samut Sakhon City 4 pts, Thonburi United 1 pt.) | |
| 4 | Thonburi United | 26 | 17 | 5 | 4 | 56 | 32 | +24 | 56 | |
| 5 | Kasem Bundit University | 26 | 16 | 4 | 6 | 64 | 19 | +45 | 52 | |
| 6 | Prime Bangkok | 26 | 13 | 9 | 4 | 52 | 23 | +29 | 48 | |
| 7 | Royal Thai Air Force | 26 | 8 | 6 | 12 | 41 | 47 | −6 | 30 | |
| 8 | Chamchuri United | 26 | 6 | 8 | 12 | 28 | 41 | −13 | 26 | |
| 9 | Royal Thai Army | 26 | 5 | 6 | 15 | 27 | 59 | −32 | 21 (Note: Royal Thai Army ahead on head-to-head points record; Royal Thai Army 4 pts, VRN Muangnont 1 pt.) | |
| 10 | VRN Muangnont | 26 | 4 | 9 | 13 | 18 | 35 | −17 | 21 | |
| 11 | AUU Inter Bangkok | 26 | 4 | 8 | 14 | 24 | 49 | −25 | 20 (Note: AUU Inter Bangkok is ahead on the head-to-head record; AUU Inter Bangkok 3 pts (GD +1), Samut Prakan 3 pts (GD -1).) | |
| 12 | Samut Prakan | 26 | 5 | 5 | 16 | 20 | 59 | −39 | 20 | |
| 13 | Nonthaburi United | 26 | 3 | 8 | 15 | 26 | 50 | −24 | 17 | |
| 14 | The iCON RSU (R) | 26 | 4 | 4 | 18 | 19 | 72 | −53 | 16 | Relegation to the Thailand Semi-pro League |

Source: Thai League
Rules for classification: 1) Points; 2) Head-to-head points; 3) Head-to-head goal difference; 4) Head-to-head goal scored; 5) Overall goal difference; 6) Overall goal scored; 7) Fair play points; 8) Play-off without extra time).
(C) Champions; (Q) Qualified for the phase indicated; (R) Relegated

== National Championship stage ==
The national championship stage is the next stage from the regional stage. 1st and 2nd places of each zone qualified for this stage by being featured in 2 groups. Teams from the Northern, Northeastern, and Eastern regions would have qualified for the upper group. Meanwhile, teams from the Western, Southern, and Bangkok Metropolitan regions would have qualified for the lower group. Winners, runners-ups, and third-placed of the national championship stage would be promoted to the 2024–25 Thai League 2.

=== Group stage ===
Upper region

| Pos | Team | Pld | W | D | L | GF | GA | GD | Pts | Qualification | SKU | MSK | BKI | KBU | PLU | MJU |
|---|---|---|---|---|---|---|---|---|---|---|---|---|---|---|---|---|
| 1 | Sisaket United (P) | 5 | 4 | 1 | 0 | 9 | 3 | +6 | 13 | Qualification to the finals and promotion to the 2024–25 Thai League 2 | — | — | 2–1 | 3–0 | — | 1–0 |
| 2 | Mahasarakham SBT (O, P) | 5 | 2 | 2 | 1 | 8 | 7 | +1 | 8 | Qualification to the third place play-offs | 1–1 | — | — | 2–1 | — | — |
| 3 | Bankhai United | 5 | 2 | 1 | 2 | 7 | 7 | 0 | 7 | | — | 1–2 | — | — | 2–1 | — |
| 4 | Saimit Kabin United | 5 | 1 | 2 | 2 | 5 | 8 | −3 | 5 | | — | — | 1–1 | — | 2–1 | 1–1 |
| 5 | Phitsanulok Unity | 5 | 1 | 1 | 3 | 6 | 8 | −2 | 4 | | 1–2 | 1–0 | — | — | — | 2–2 |
| 6 | Maejo United | 5 | 0 | 3 | 2 | 7 | 9 | −2 | 3 | | — | 3–3 | 1–2 | — | — | — |

Source: Thai League
Rules for classification: 1) Points; 2) Head-to-head points; 3) Goal difference; 4) Goals scored;).
(O) Play-off winners; (P) Promoted

Lower region

| Pos | Team | Pld | W | D | L | GF | GA | GD | Pts | Qualification | BKK | PLG | NBU | SKA | PTU | ATG |
|---|---|---|---|---|---|---|---|---|---|---|---|---|---|---|---|---|
| 1 | Bangkok (C, P) | 5 | 3 | 2 | 0 | 9 | 4 | +5 | 11 | Qualification to the finals and promotion to the 2024–25 Thai League 2 | — | — | 1–0 | 2–2 | — | 3–0 |
| 2 | Phatthalung | 5 | 2 | 2 | 1 | 8 | 6 | +2 | 8 | Qualification to the third place play-offs | 1–2 | — | — | — | 3–1 | — |
| 3 | North Bangkok University | 5 | 1 | 3 | 1 | 7 | 6 | +1 | 6 (Note: The head-to-head record and overall goals difference are tied; North Bangkok University 1 pt (overall GD +1), Songkhla 1 pt (overall GD +1). North Bangkok University is ahead on the overall goals scored.) | | — | 2–2 | — | — | — | 4–2 |
| 4 | Songkhla | 5 | 1 | 3 | 1 | 6 | 5 | +1 | 6 | | — | 0–0 | 1–1 | — | 2–0 | — |
| 5 | PTU Pathum Thani | 5 | 1 | 2 | 2 | 6 | 8 | −2 | 5 | | 1–1 | — | 0–0 | — | — | 4–2 |
| 6 | Angthong | 5 | 1 | 0 | 4 | 7 | 14 | −7 | 3 | | — | 1–2 | — | 2–1 | — | — |

Source: Thai League
Rules for classification: 1) Points; 2) Head-to-head points; 3) Goal difference; 4) Goals scored;).
(C) Champions; (P) Promoted

=== Knockout stage ===
Third place play-offs

| Team 1 | Agg. | Team 2 | 1st leg | 2nd leg |
|---|---|---|---|---|
| Mahasarakham SBT | 3–2 | Phatthalung | 2–0 | 1–2 |

Finals

| Team 1 | Agg. | Team 2 | 1st leg | 2nd leg |
|---|---|---|---|---|
| Sisaket United | 2–3 | Bangkok | 1–1 | 1–2 |

== See also ==
- 2023–24 Thai League 1
- 2023–24 Thai League 2
- 2023–24 Thai League 3 Northern Region
- 2023–24 Thai League 3 Northeastern Region
- 2023–24 Thai League 3 Eastern Region
- 2023–24 Thai League 3 Western Region
- 2023–24 Thai League 3 Southern Region
- 2023–24 Thai League 3 Bangkok Metropolitan Region
- 2023–24 Thai League 3 National Championship
- 2023–24 Thai League 3 Cup
- 2023–24 Thai FA Cup
- 2023–24 Thai League Cup
- 2023 Thailand Champions Cup
