= 2023–24 Thai League 3 Northern Region =

Thai League 3 Northern Region
- Season: 2023–24
- Dates: 16 September 2023 – 24 February 2024
- Champions: Phitsanulok Unity
- Relegated: Rongseemaechaithanachotiwat Phayao; Kongkrailas United
- T3 National Championship: Phitsanulok Unity; Maejo United
- Matches: 110
- Goals: 286 (2.6 per match)
- Top goalscorer: (Thailand) Kunburus Sounses (15 goals; Kongkrailas United)
- Best goalkeeper: (Thailand) Natthanan Pankhlai (6 clean sheets; Kamphaengphet) (Thailand) Panut Bunlang (6 clean sheets; Phitsanulok Unity)
- Biggest home win: 4 goals difference Chiangrai City 4–0 Kongkrailas United (30 September 2023); Maejo United 4–0 Northern Nakhon Mae Sot United (7 January 2024); Phitsanulok 5–1 Rongseemaechaithanachotiwat Phayao (10 February 2024)
- Biggest away win: 4 goals difference Kongkrailas United 0–4 Maejo United (5 November 2023); Kongkrailas United 2–6 Phitsanulok (14 January 2024); Nakhon Sawan See Khwae City 1–5 Phitsanulok (24 February 2024)
- Highest scoring: 8 goals Kongkrailas United 2–6 Phitsanulok (14 January 2024)
- Longest winning run: 6 matches Phitsanulok
- Longest unbeaten run: 15 matches Phitsanulok Unity
- Longest winless run: 12 matches Kamphaengphet
- Longest losing run: 6 matches Chiangrai City

The 2023–24 Thai League 3 Northern region is a region in the regional stage of the 2023–24 Thai League 3. The tournament was sponsored by Rising Sun fertilizer, and known as the Rising Sun Fertilizer League for sponsorship purposes. A total of 11 teams located in Northern, Western, and Central of Thailand will compete in the league of the Northern region.

== Changes from last season ==
=== Promotion or relegation ===
Team	League		Notes
Team	Previous season	Current season	Notes
From Thai League 3
Chiangrai Lanna (substituted off)	Thai League 3	Thailand Semi-pro League	
Nan (substituted off)	Thai League 3	Thailand Semi-pro League	Relegation due to club licensing reason
To Thai League 3
Khelang United (substituted on)	Thailand Semi-pro League	Thai League 3	

=== Renaming ===
Team	Old name	Current name
Nakhon Sawan See Khwae City	See Khwae City F.C.	Nakhon Sawan See Khwae City F.C.
Northern Nakhon Mae Sot United	Nakhon Mae Sot United F.C.	Northern Nakhon Mae Sot United F.C.

== Teams ==
=== Number of teams by province ===
Position	Province	Number	Teams
1	Phitsanulok	2	Phitsanulok and Phitsanulok Unity
2	Chiang Rai	1	Chiangrai City
2	Chiang Mai	1	Maejo United
2	Kamphaeng Phet	1	Kamphaengphet
2	Lampang	1	Khelang United
2	Nakhon Sawan	1	Nakhon Sawan See Khwae City
2	Phayao	1	Rongseemaechaithanachotiwat Phayao
2	Sukhothai	1	Kongkrailas United
2	Tak	1	Northern Nakhon Mae Sot United
2	Uttaradit	1	Uttaradit Saksiam

=== Stadiums and locations ===
Locations of the 2023–24 Thai League 3 Northern region teams

Team	Location	Stadium	Coordinates
Chiangrai City	Chiangrai (Mueang)	Leo Chiangrai Stadium	19°57′25″N 99°52′29″E
Kamphaengphet	Kamphaengphet (Mueang)	Cha Kung Rao Stadium	16°28′40″N 99°31′17″E
Khelang United	Lampang (Mueang)	Stadium of Lampang Rajabhat University	18°14′07″N 99°29′22″E
Kongkrailas United	Sukhothai (Mueang)	Thalay Luang Stadium	17°03′43″N 99°47′39″E
Maejo United	Chiangmai (San Sai)	Stadium of Maejo University	18°53′54″N 99°00′48″E
Nakhon Sawan See Khwae City	Nakhon Sawan (Mueang)	Stadium of Nakhon Sawan Sports School	15°44′33″N 100°07′56″E
Northern Nakhon Mae Sot United	Tak (Mae Sot)	Five Border Districts Stadium	16°44′07″N 98°33′52″E
Phitsanulok	Phitsanulok (Mueang)	Phitsanulok PAO. Stadium	16°50′48″N 100°15′51″E
Phitsanulok Unity	Phitsanulok (Mueang)	Phitsanulok PAO. Stadium	16°50′48″N 100°15′51″E
Rongseemaechaithanachotiwat Phayao	Phayao (Dok Khamtai)	Phayao Provincial Stadium	19°09′22″N 99°58′22″E
Uttaradit Saksiam	Uttaradit (Mueang)	Uttaradit Provincial Stadium	17°36′34″N 100°06′39″E

=== Foreign players ===
A T3 team could register 3 foreign players from foreign players all around the world. A team can use 3 foreign players on the field in each game.

Note :
(substituted off) : players who released during second leg transfer window;
(substituted on) : players who registered during second leg transfer window.

AFC member countries players.
CAF member countries players.
CONCACAF member countries players.
CONMEBOL member countries players.
OFC member countries players.
UEFA member countries players.
No foreign player registered.

Club	Leg	Player 1	Player 2	Player 3
Chiangrai City	1st	(British Virgin Islands) Louis William Martin James (substituted off)
Chiangrai City	2nd	(South Korea) Kim Seo-woo (substituted on)	(South Korea) Lee Ki-joon (substituted on)	(South Korea) Kim Min-je (substituted on)
Kamphaengphet	1st	(Ghana) Mohammed Rabiu Junior (substituted off)	(United States) Kaio Marques da Silva	(Cameroon) Abbo Bouba
Kamphaengphet	2nd	(United States) Mumbi Kwesele (substituted on)	(United States) Kaio Marques da Silva	(Cameroon) Abbo Bouba
Khelang United	1st
Khelang United	2nd	(Egypt) Mohamed Samy Abdelkawy Abouelseoud (substituted on)	(Ivory Coast) Akpa Agbandji Augustin (substituted on)
Kongkrailas United	1st
Kongkrailas United	2nd	(Brazil) Víctor Luis Ferreira Cabral (substituted on)	(Brazil) Mateus Antônio Ferraboli (substituted on)	(South Korea) Choi Min-suk (substituted on)
Maejo United	1st		(Guinea) Maiga Diabate Ibrahima Saydou	(Japan) Tatsuhide Shimizu
Maejo United	2nd	(Japan) Koki Narita (substituted on)	(Guinea) Maiga Diabate Ibrahima Saydou	(Japan) Tatsuhide Shimizu
Nakhon Sawan See Khwae City	1st	(Brazil) Vinícius Silva Freitas (substituted off)	(Japan) Hayato Eguchi (substituted off)	(Japan) Issei Kikuchi
Nakhon Sawan See Khwae City	2nd	(Republic of the Congo) Kabangu Nathan (substituted on)	(Republic of the Congo) Simba Masala (substituted on)	(Japan) Issei Kikuchi
Northern Nakhon Mae Sot United	1st	(Cameroon) Abe'e Ndjo'o Hubert (substituted off)	(Cameroon) Tewidikum Tah Nivan	(Togo) Ekue Andre Houma
Northern Nakhon Mae Sot United	2nd	(Cameroon) Ngang Anlaa Elysee (substituted on)	(Cameroon) Tewidikum Tah Nivan	(Togo) Ekue Andre Houma
Phitsanulok	1st	(Brazil) Elivélton de Araújo Rego (substituted off)	(Uruguay) Diego Silva (substituted off)	(Brazil) Caio da Conceição Silva
Phitsanulok	2nd	(Brazil) Diogo Pereira (substituted on)	(Brazil) Thiago de Jesús dos Santos (substituted on)	(Brazil) Caio da Conceição Silva
Phitsanulok Unity	1st	(Brazil) Víctor Luis Ferreira Cabral (substituted off)	(Brazil) Mateus Antônio Ferraboli (substituted off)	(Ivory Coast) Diarrassouba Hamed de Silci
Phitsanulok Unity	2nd	(Brazil) Guilherme Moreira (substituted on)	(Iraq) Selwan Al-Jaberi (substituted on)	(Ivory Coast) Diarrassouba Hamed de Silci
Rongseemaechaithanachotiwat Phayao	1st		(Iran) Milad Sasani Nezhad (substituted off)	(Iran) Amirmohammad Karamdar
Rongseemaechaithanachotiwat Phayao	2nd	(South Korea) Cho Woo-hyuk (substituted on)	(South Korea) Lee Ho-been (substituted on)	(Iran) Amirmohammad Karamdar
Uttaradit Saksiam	1st	(Cameroon) Ngang Anlaa Elysee (substituted off)	(Azerbaijan) Mammad Guliyev (substituted off)	(Egypt) Basam Radwan Mahmoud Mohamed Afify
Uttaradit Saksiam	2nd		(Ghana) Oscar Plape (substituted on)	(Egypt) Basam Radwan Mahmoud Mohamed Afify

== League table ==
=== Standings ===
Pos	Team	Pld	W	D	L	GF	GA	GD	Pts	Qualification or relegation
1	Phitsanulok Unity (C, Q)	20	12	7	1	33	18	+15	43	Qualification to the National Championship stage
2	Maejo United (Q)	20	11	7	2	36	17	+19	40	Qualification to the National Championship stage
3	Phitsanulok	20	10	8	2	43	22	+21	38	
4	Rongseemaechaithanachotiwat Phayao (R)	20	8	7	5	28	24	+4	31	Relegation to the Thailand Semi-pro League (Note: Rongseemaechaithanachotiwat Phayao and Kongkrailas United were administratively relegated to the 2025 Thailand Semi-pro League for failing to meet club licensing standards.)
5	Northern Nakhon Mae Sot United	20	5	8	7	23	28	−5	23	
6	Uttaradit Saksiam	20	5	7	8	24	26	−2	22 (Note: Uttaradit Saksiam ahead on head-to-head points record; Uttaradit Saksiam 6 pts, Kongkrailas United 0 pts.)	
7	Kongkrailas United (R)	20	6	4	10	29	45	−16	22	Relegation to the Thailand Semi-pro League
8	Khelang United	20	5	6	9	17	26	−9	21	
9	Kamphaengphet	20	4	7	9	17	24	−7	19	
10	Chiangrai City	20	5	3	12	23	30	−7	18	
11	Nakhon Sawan See Khwae City (Note: Nakhon Sawan See Khwae City remained in the league after Rongseemaechaithanachotiwat Phayao and Kongkrailas United failed to meet the club licensing criteria for the 2024–25 season, resulting in Nakhon Sawan See Khwae City retaining their spot.)	20	3	8	9	13	26	−13	17	

Source: Thai League
Rules for classification: 1) Points; 2) Head-to-head points; 3) Head-to-head goal difference; 4) Head-to-head goal scored; 5) Overall goal difference; 6) Overall goal scored; 7) Fair play points; 8) Play-off without extra time).
(C) Champions; (Q) Qualified for the phase indicated; (R) Relegated

=== Positions by round ===
Team ╲ Round	1	2	3	4	5	6	7	8	9	10	11	12	13	14	15	16	17	18	19	20	21	22
Phitsanulok Unity	5	5	5	6	8	6	8	5	5	4	2	2	1	2	1	1	1	1	1	1	1	1
Maejo United	9	7	8	7	5	4	1	1	1	1	1	1	2	1	2	2	2	2	2	2	2	2
Phitsanulok	7	6	6	8	3	7	5	6	2	2	3	5	5	5	5	5	4	4	4	3	3	3
Rongseemaechaithanachotiwat Phayao	10	3	4	5	6	8	6	2	3	3	4	3	4	3	3	3	3	3	3	4	4	4
Northern Nakhon Mae Sot United	4	9	9	9	9	10	10	9	10	10	10	9	10	10	10	10	8	7	8	8	8	5
Uttaradit Saksiam	11	4	2	2	2	2	2	3	4	5	5	4	3	4	4	4	5	5	5	5	5	6
Kongkrailas United	3	11	11	11	11	9	9	10	9	9	9	10	9	7	7	8	6	6	6	6	6	7
Khelang United	8	2	3	3	7	5	7	8	8	8	8	8	6	8	8	6	7	8	7	7	7	8
Kamphaengphet	2	8	7	4	4	3	3	7	7	7	7	7	8	9	9	9	10	10	10	9	9	9
Chiangrai City	1	1	1	1	1	1	4	4	6	6	6	6	7	6	6	7	9	9	9	10	11	10
Nakhon Sawan See Khwae City	6	10	10	10	10	11	11	11	11	11	11	11	11	11	11	11	11	11	11	11	10	11

Source: Thai League
= Qualification to the National Championship stage; = Relegation to the Thailand Semi-pro League

=== Results by round ===
Team ╲ Round	1	2	3	4	5	6	7	8	9	10	11	12	13	14	15	16	17	18	19	20	21	22
Phitsanulok Unity	D	D	D	D	L	W	N	W	D	W	W	W	W	D	W	W	N	W	W	W	D	W
Maejo United	D	D	N	D	W	W	W	W	D	W	D	D	N	W	L	D	W	W	W	W	L	W
Phitsanulok	D	D	D	N	W	L	W	D	W	D	D	D	D	N	W	L	W	W	W	W	W	W
Rongseemaechaithanachotiwat Phayao	N	W	D	D	D	L	W	W	D	D	D	W	L	W	D	W	W	W	L	L	L	N
Northern Nakhon Mae Sot United	D	L	D	D	L	N	D	W	L	L	D	D	D	L	W	N	W	D	L	L	W	W
Uttaradit Saksiam	L	W	W	D	W	L	D	N	D	D	D	W	D	L	W	D	L	N	L	L	L	L
Kongkrailas United	D	L	L	D	L	W	D	L	W	L	N	L	W	W	L	L	W	L	W	D	N	L
Khelang United	D	W	D	D	L	W	L	L	D	N	L	D	W	L	L	W	L	L	W	N	D	L
Kamphaengphet	D	N	D	W	D	W	D	L	L	D	D	N	L	L	D	L	L	L	L	W	W	L
Chiangrai City	W	D	W	L	W	L	L	D	N	L	D	L	L	W	L	L	L	L	N	L	L	W
Nakhon Sawan See Khwae City	D	L	L	D	N	L	L	L	D	W	D	L	D	D	N	W	L	D	L	D	W	L

Source: Thai League
N = No match; W = Won; D = Drawn; L = Lost

=== Results ===
Home \ Away	CRC	KPP	KLU	KKL	MJU	NSK	NMS	PLK	PLU	RMP	UTD
Chiangrai City	—	3–1	1–2	4–0	1–2	0–1	1–0	2–2	2–3	1–3	2–0
Kamphaengphet	1–0	—	1–2	2–2	1–0	2–1	3–3	0–1	0–1	0–0	0–0
Khelang United	2–0	0–0	—	3–4	0–0	1–0	1–1	2–3	1–1	0–3	0–1
Kongkrailas United	2–1	1–0	1–1	—	0–4	1–2	3–0	2–6	3–3	2–0	0–3
Maejo United	2–1	1–1	4–1	3–1	—	1–0	4–0	1–1	2–1	2–2	0–0
Nakhon Sawan See Khwae City	1–1	2–1	0–0	0–0	0–3	—	0–2	1–5	0–0	0–1	1–3
Northern Nakhon Mae Sot United	1–0	1–0	0–1	2–3	2–2	1–1	—	1–1	1–2	2–2	1–1
Phitsanulok	4–1	3–1	2–0	2–0	1–1	1–1	0–0	—	0–1	5–1	3–2
Phitsanulok Unity	0–0	2–1	1–0	4–2	3–1	0–0	1–0	3–1	—	2–1	2–0
Rongseemaechaithanachotiwat Phayao	2–0	1–1	1–0	2–1	0–1	2–1	1–2	0–0	2–2	—	3–1
Uttaradit Saksiam	1–2	0–1	2–0	3–1	1–2	1–1	1–3	2–2	1–1	1–1	—

Source: Thai League
Legend: Blue = home team win; Yellow = draw; Red = away team win.
For upcoming matches, an "a" indicates there is an article about the rivalry between the two participants.

== Season statistics ==
=== Top scorers ===
As of 24 February 2024.

Rank	Player	Club	Goals
1	(Thailand) Kunburus Sounses	Kongkrailas United	15
2	(Brazil) Caio da Conceição Silva	Phitsanulok	13
3	(Thailand) Thongchai Ampornwiman	Maejo United	11
4	(Brazil) Diogo Pereira	Phitsanulok (10 Goals)	10
5	(Thailand) Suriphat Thaensopa	Chiangrai City	8
5	(Togo) Ekue Andre Houma	Northern Nakhon Mae Sot United	8

=== Hat-tricks ===
Player	For	Against	Result	Date
(Thailand) Kunburus Sounses	Kongkrailas United	Khelang United	4–3 (A)	6 January 2024
(Brazil) Caio da Conceição Silva	Phitsanulok	Kongkrailas United	6–2 (A)	14 January 2024
(Brazil) Diogo Pereira	Phitsanulok	Khelang United	3–2 (A)	28 January 2024

Notes: (H) = Home team; (A) = Away team

=== Clean sheets ===
As of 24 February 2024.

Rank	Player	Club	Clean sheets
1	(Thailand) Natthanan Pankhlai	Kamphaengphet	6
1	(Thailand) Panut Bunlang	Phitsanulok Unity	6
3	(Thailand) Phoomin Thumraksa	Nakhon Sawan See Khwae City	5
3	(Thailand) Wichitchai Raksa	Rongseemaechaithanachotiwat Phayao	5
3	(Thailand) Weerapong Lapkhaw	Uttaradit Saksiam	5
6	(Thailand) Sirassawut Wongruankhum	Chiangrai City	4
6	(Thailand) Supachai Muangsawan	Kongkrailas United	4
6	(Thailand) Anusorn Chansod	Maejo United	4

== Attendances ==
=== Overall statistical table ===
Pos	Team	Total	High	Low	Average	Change
1	Phitsanulok	8,789	1,781	0	977	−7.7%
2	Rongseemaechaithanachotiwat Phayao	8,822	1,135	531	882	+25.1%
3	Uttaradit Saksiam	2,387	516	0	265	−37.2%
4	Phitsanulok Unity	1,890	995	0	210	+8.8%
5	Kongkrailas United	1,255	250	0	209	+7.2%
6	Northern Nakhon Mae Sot United	1,960	685	112	196	+18.8%
7	Nakhon Sawan See Khwae City	1,799	495	40	180	−44.8%
8	Khelang United	1,643	350	85	164	n/a
9	Maejo United	1,449	325	69	145	+2.8%
10	Kamphaengphet	1,216	275	50	122	−10.3%
11	Chiangrai City	753	150	23	75	−52.8%
	League total	31,963	1,781	0	310	−4.3%

Updated to games played on 24 February 2024
Source: Thai League

=== Attendances by home match played ===
Team \ Match played	1	2	3	4	5	6	7	8	9	10	Total
Chiangrai City	80	150	80	79	34	23	60	85	102	60	753
Kamphaengphet	195	150	80	275	59	51	50	76	130	150	1,216
Khelang United	200	200	350	106	174	96	85	120	112	200	1,643
Kongkrailas United	Unk.1	210	185	250	Unk.3	150	Unk.4	250	Unk.5	210	1,255
Maejo United	141	300	139	97	69	101	97	100	80	325	1,449
Nakhon Sawan See Khwae City	231	298	150	120	40	130	140	45	150	495	1,799
Northern Nakhon Mae Sot United	209	685	133	171	124	156	112	112	124	134	1,960
Phitsanulok	523	Unk.2	1,248	683	826	1,264	1,781	802	831	831	8,789
Phitsanulok Unity	121	104	995	100	79	73	124	150	144	Unk.7	1,890
Rongseemaechaithanachotiwat Phayao	1,135	987	933	838	531	935	956	839	985	683	8,822
Uttaradit Saksiam	246	252	299	254	516	209	249	209	153	Unk.6	2,387

Note:
Unk.1 Some error of T3 official match report 16 September 2023 (Kongkrailas United 3–3 Phitsanulok Unity).
Unk.2 Some error of T3 official match report 1 October 2023 (Phitsanulok 0–0 Northern Nakhon Mae Sot United).
Unk.3 Some error of T3 official match report 19 November 2023 (Kongkrailas United 1–2 Nakhon Sawan See Khwae City).
Unk.4 Some error of T3 official match report 24 December 2023 (Kongkrailas United 2–1 Chiangrai City).
Unk.5 Some error of T3 official match report 27 January 2024 (Kongkrailas United 1–0 Kamphaengphet).
Unk.6 Some error of T3 official match report 24 February 2024 (Uttaradit Saksiam 1–2 Chiangrai City).
Unk.7 Some error of T3 official match report 24 February 2024 (Phitsanulok Unity 4–2 Kongkrailas United).
