= Teerapong Puttasukha =

Thai footballer

Personal information
- Full name: Teerapong Puttasukha
- Date of birth: 11 February 1987 (age 39)
- Place of birth: Phatthalung, Thailand
- Height: 1.84 m (6 ft 1/2 in)
- Position: Goalkeeper

Team information
- Current team: Nakhon Si United
- Number: 59

Youth career
- 2009: Ayutthaya

Senior career*
| Years | Team | Apps | (Gls) |
| 2010–2013 | Ayutthaya | 50 | (0) |
| 2014 | Bangkok Glass | 4 | (0) |
| 2015 | Nakhon Pathom United | 25 | (0) |
| 2016 | BBCU | 10 | (0) |
| 2017 | Ubon UMT United | 0 | (0) |
| 2018 | Sisaket | 0 | (0) |
| 2019 | Lamphun Warrior | | |
| 2020 | Sisaket | | |
| 2021 | Songkhla | | |
| 2021–2022 | Trang | | |
| 2022–2025 | Muangtrang United | | |
| 2025– | Nakhon Si United | | |
- * Club domestic league appearances and goals as of 15 May 2022

Teerapong Puttasukha (Thai: ธีรพงศ์ พุทธสุขา; born 11 February 1987) is a Thai footballer who plays as a goalkeeper for Nakhon Si United in Thai League 2.
