= Seiya Kojima =

Japanese footballer

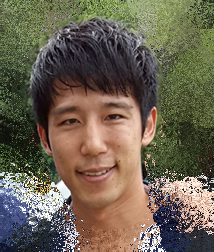

Personal information
- Date of birth: 2 June 1989 (age 37)
- Place of birth: Nogi, Tochigi, Japan
- Height: 1.72 m (5 ft 8 in)
- Position: Midfielder

Youth career
- 2005–2007: RKU Kashiwa H.S.

Senior career*
Years	Team	Apps	(Gls)
2008–2011	Ryutsu Keizai University	35	(1)
2012–2013	Sriracha		
2013	Navy		
2014–2015	Ayutthaya		
2016–2017	Khon Kaen		
2017	Navy	17	(1)
2018	Abahani Limited Dhaka	0	(0)
2018	Ubon UMT United	10	(2)
2019	Nara Club	2	(0)
2019	BG Pathum United	13	(1)
2020–2021	Kasetsart	22	(3)
2021–2022	Ayutthaya United	27	(5)
2022	Suphanburi	16	(2)
2023–2025	Bangkok	69	(10)
- * Club domestic league appearances and goals as of 6 May 2025 (UTC)

Seiya Kojima (小島 聖矢, Kojima Seiya; born 2 June 1989) is a Japanese footballer.

== Career statistics ==
=== Club ===
As of 6 January 2020.

Club	Season	League			Cup		Continental		Other		Total	
Club	Season	Division	Apps	Goals	Apps	Goals	Apps	Goals	Apps	Goals	Apps	Goals
Ryutsu Keizai University	2008	Japan Football League	11	1	0	0	–		0	0	11	1
Ryutsu Keizai University	2009	Japan Football League	13	0	0	0	–		1 (Note: Appearances in the Kantō Soccer League)	0	14	0
Ryutsu Keizai University	2010	Japan Football League	11	0	1 (Note: Appearances in the Japan College Prime Minister's Cup)	0	–		5	0	17	0
Ryutsu Keizai University	2011	–			1 (Note: Appearances in the All Japan Senior Football Championship)	0	–		1	0	2	0
Total			35	1	2	0	–		7	0	44	1
Navy	2017	Thai League 1	17	1	2 (Note: Appearances in the Thai FA Cup)	0	–		0	0	19	1
Abahani Limited Dhaka	2017–2018	Bangladesh Premier League	?	?	?	?	6 (Note: Appearances in the AFC Cup)	2	0	0	6	2
Ubon UMT United	2018	Thai League 1	10	2	0	0	–		0	0	10	2
Nara Club	2019	Japan Football League	2	0	0	0	–		0	0	2	0
BG Pathum United	2019	Thai League 2	13	1	0	0	–		0	0	13	1
Career total			77	5	4	0	6	2	7	0	91	6

== Honours ==
BG Pathum United

- Thai League 2: 2019

Bangkok

- Thai League 3: 2023–24
- Thai League 3 Bangkok Metropolitan Region: 2023–24

Abahani Limited Dhaka

- Federation Cup: 2018
