= Nattapoom Maya =

Thai footballer

Personal information
- Full name: Nattapoom Maya
- Date of birth: 5 December 1991 (age 34)
- Place of birth: Phitsanulok, Thailand
- Height: 1.77 m (5 ft 10 in)
- Position: Forward

Team information
- Current team: Muang Trang United
- Number: 9

Senior career*
Years	Team	Apps	(Gls)
2017	Phuket		
2018	PT Prachuap	1	(0)
2018	Ayutthaya		
2019	Lampang	13	(3)
2020–2021	Chiangmai	19	(2)
2021–2024	Nakhon Si United	61	(6)
2024	Chanthaburi	7	(0)
2025	Navy	7	(2)
2025	Saraburi United	10	(4)
2026	Nakhon Si United	15	(2)
2026–	Muang Trang United	0	(0)
- * Club domestic league appearances and goals as of 30 April 2026

Nattapoom Maya (Thai: ณัฐภูมิ มายา, born December 5, 1991) is a Thai professional footballer.
