= Jordy Vleugels =

Belgian footballer (born 1996)

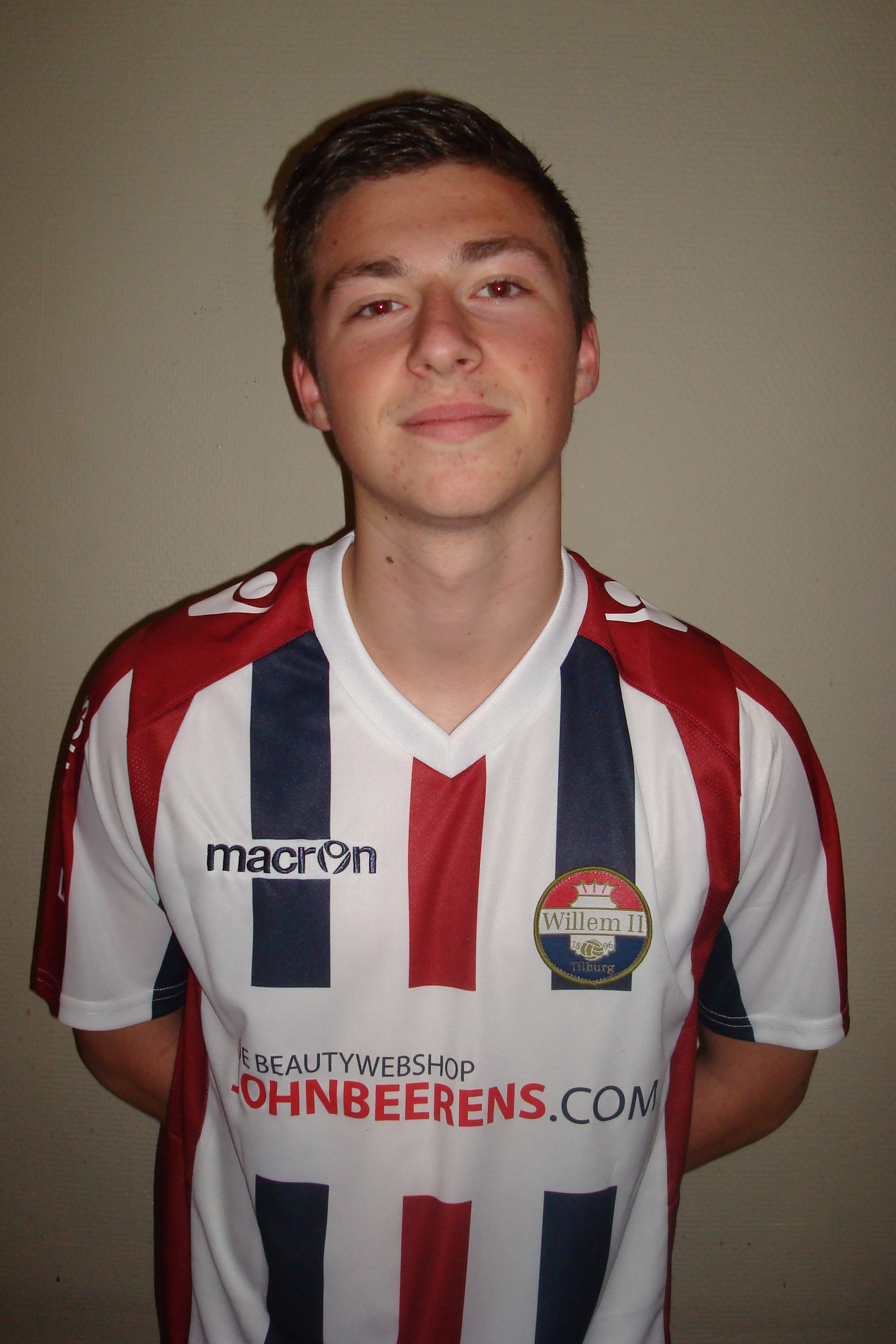

Personal information
- Full name: Jordy Bart Vleugels
- Date of birth: 17 May 1996 (age 30)
- Place of birth: Mol, Belgium
- Height: 1.74 m (5 ft 8 1/2 in)
- Position: Midfielder

Team information
- Current team: Muang Trang United
- Number: 49

Youth career
- Westerlo
- ?–2014: Willem II

Senior career*
Years	Team	Apps	(Gls)
2014–2016	Willem II	2	(0)
2016	→ Dordrecht (loan)	12	(0)
2016–2017	Dordrecht	25	(1)
2018–2019	Kairat-A		
2019	P.O. Xylotymbou	12	(0)
2020–2021	Magpies Crusaders	24	(3)
2022	Magni Grenivík	16	(0)
2023	MH Nakhon Si City	11	(1)
2024–	Muang Trang United	4	(2)

International career^{‡}
2013–2014	Belgium U18	8	(0)
2014	Belgium U19	3	(0)
- * Club domestic league appearances and goals as of 27 December 2022 ‡ National team caps and goals as of 1 July 2015

Jordy Vleugels (born 17 May 1996) is a Belgian footballer who plays as a midfielder for Muang Trang United.

== Club career ==
On 4 April 2018, Kairat announced that Vleugels had signed for their second team Kairat-A.

After a half year in Cyprus, it was confirmed on 8 November 2019, that Vleugels would join Australian club, Magpies Crusaders, from 2020.

== Club statistics ==
As of match played 23 March 2019.

Club	Season	League		Cup		Total	
Club	Season	Apps	Goals	Apps	Goals	Apps	Goals
Willem II
Willem II	2013–14	1	0	0	0	1	0
Willem II	2014–15	0	0	0	0	0	0
Willem II	2015–16	1	0	0	0	1	0
Willem II	Total	2	0	0	0	2	0
Dordrecht
Dordrecht	2015–16	12	0	0	0	12	0
Dordrecht	2016–17	22	1	1	0	23	1
Dordrecht	2017–18	3	0	1	0	4	0
Dordrecht	Total	37	1	2	0	39	1
P.O. Xylotymbou
P.O. Xylotymbou	2018–19	8	0	0	0	8	0
Career total		47	1	2	0	49	1
