= Pongsagorn Samattanared =

Thai footballer

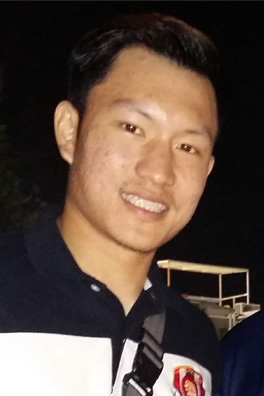
- 2018

Personal information
- Full name: Pongsagorn Samattanared
- Date of birth: 3 April 1992 (age 34)
- Place of birth: Khon Kaen, Thailand
- Height: 1.81 m (5 ft 11 1/2 in)
- Position: Goalkeeper

Team information
- Current team: Phatthalung
- Number: 99

Senior career*
| Years | Team | Apps | (Gls) |
| 2015–2016 | Navy | | |
| 2018 | Navy | 2 | (0) |
| 2019–2021 | Suphanburi | 3 | (0) |
| 2021–2022 | Nakhon Si United | 3 | (0) |
| 2022–2024 | Suphanburi | 8 | (0) |
| 2024– | Phatthalung | 0 | (0) |
- * Club domestic league appearances and goals as of 12 May 2024

Pongsagorn Samattanared (Thai: พงศกร สมรรถนเรศวร์; born April 3, 1992) is a Thai professional footballer who plays as a goalkeeper for Thai League 3 club Phatthalung.
