= Trang Municipality Stadium =

Multi-purpose stadium in Trang Province, Thailand

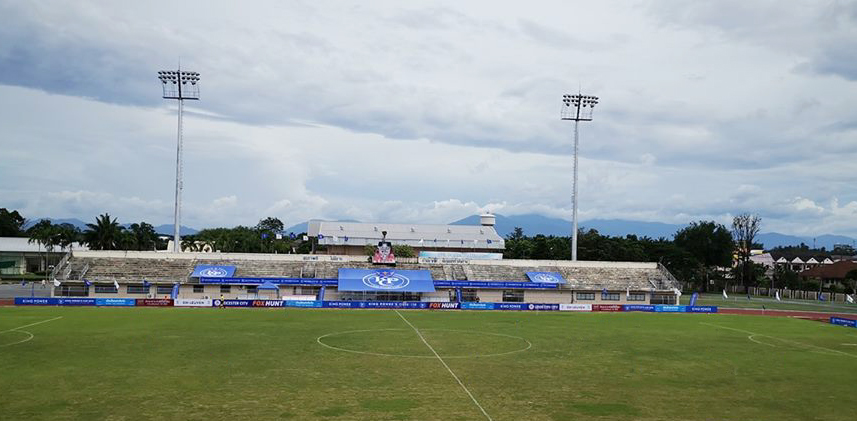
- Interactive map of Trang Municipality Stadium
- Location: Trang, Thailand
- Coordinates: 7°33′12″N 99°36′55″E
- Capacity: 4,769
- Surface: Grass

Tenants
- Trang F.C. 2010-2012; Muang Trang United

Trang Municipality Stadium or Trang Provincial Stadium (Thai: สนามกีฬาเทศบาลนครตรัง หรือ สนามกีฬาจังหวัดตรัง) is a multi-purpose stadium in Trang Province, Thailand. It is currently used mostly for football matches and is the home stadium of Trang F.C.
