= Thalay Luang Stadium =

Stadium in Sukhothai Province, Thailand

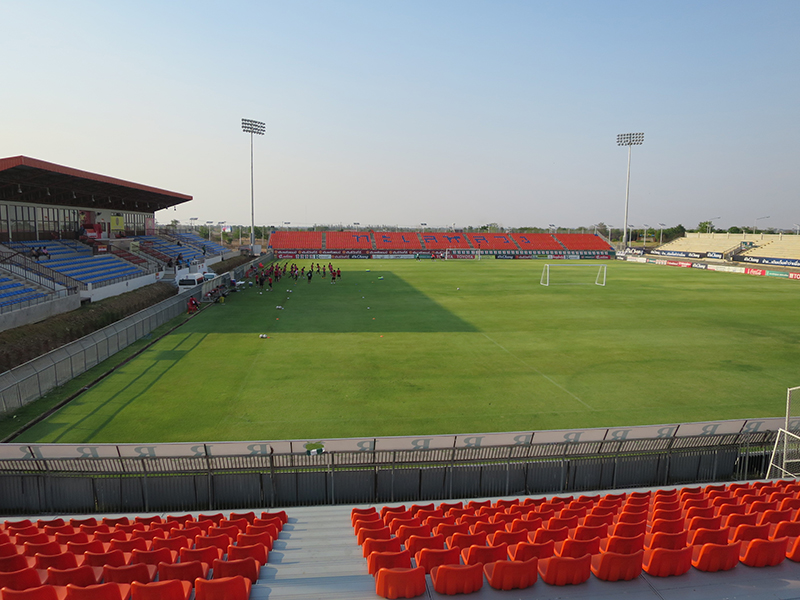
- Interactive map of Thalay Luang Stadium
- Location: Ban Kluai, Mueang Sukhothai, Sukhothai, Thailand
- Coordinates: 17°03′42″N 99°47′37″E
- Owner: Sukhothai Provincial Administration Organization
- Operator: Sukhothai F.C.
- Capacity: 9,500
- Surface: Grass

Construction
- Built: 2013
- Opened: 2015

Tenants
- Sukhothai F.C. (2016–present); Kongkrailas United (2022–present)

Thalay Luang Stadium (Thai: สนามฟุตบอลทะเลหลวง) is a football stadium in Sukhothai Province, Thailand. It is currently used mostly for football matches and is the home stadium of Sukhothai. The stadium can hold up to 9,500 capacity.

== Background ==
Thalay Luang Stadium is built in 2013 where Sukhothai Provincial Administration Organization wanted to used the stadium as the primary stadium for Thai League 1 club Sukhothai. In 2015, the club moved from Sukhothai Institute of Physical Education Stadium to the Thalay Luang Stadium.

In 2017, the stadium is approved by Asian Football Federation to host the AFC Champions League games. After several months of improvement, the 8,000-seated Thalay Luang Stadium finally matches the AFC stadium criteria. Sukhothai used it to host the 2017 AFC Champions League preliminary Round 2 match against Yadanarbon on 31 January 2017.
