= Kongkrailas United F.C. =

Kongkrailas United กงไกรลาศ ยูไนเต็ด
- Full name: Kongkrailas United Football Club
- Nicknames: The killer giant snakeheads (ชะโดพิฆาต)
- Founded: 2022; 4 years ago
- Ground: Thalay Luang Stadium; Sukhothai, Thailand
- Capacity: 9,500
- Coordinates: 17°03′43″N 99°47′39″E
- Owner: Kongkrailas United Co. Ltd.
- Chairman: Suphat Srisawad
- Head coach: Rachan Sarakham
- League: Thai League 3

Kongkrailas United Football Club (Thai สโมสรฟุตบอล กงไกรลาศ ยูไนเต็ด), is a Thai football club based in Mueang, Sukhothai. The club is currently playing in the Thai League 3 Northern region.

== History ==
In early 2022, the club was established and competed in Thailand Amateur League Northern region, using the Thalay Luang Stadium as ground. At the end of the season, the club could be promoted to the Thai League 3. They use the Thalay Luang Stadium as a ground to compete for the T3 in the 2022–23 season.

In late 2022, Kongkrailas United competed in the Thai League 3 for the 2022–23 season. It is their first season in the professional league. The club started the season with a 0–2 away defeat to Wat Bot City and they ended the season with a 0–1 home defeat to the Wat Bot City. The club has finished eleventh place in the league of the Northern region. In addition, in the 2022–23 Thai League Cup Kongkrailas United was defeated 1–5 to Uttaradit Saksiam in the first qualifying round, causing them to be eliminated.

== Stadium and location ==
Coordinates	Location	Stadium	Year
17°03′43″N 99°47′39″E	Sukhothai	Thalay Luang Stadium	2022 – present

== Season by season record ==
Season	League									FA Cup	League Cup	T3 Cup	Top goalscorer	
Season	Division	P	W	D	L	F	A	Pts	Pos	FA Cup	League Cup	T3 Cup	Name	Goals
2022	TA North	5	2	3	0	9	3	9	1st	Opted out	Ineligible			
2022–23	T3 North	22	3	5	14	15	39	14	11th	Opted out	QR1		(Thailand) Chainarong Samuttha	4
2023–24	T3 North	20	6	4	10	29	45	22	7th	Opted out	QR1	QR2	(Thailand) Kunburus Sounses	15

Champions	Runners-up	Promoted	Relegated

- P = Played
- W = Games won
- D = Games drawn
- L = Games lost
- F = Goals for
- A = Goals against
- Pts = Points
- Pos = Final position
- QR1 = First Qualifying Round
- QR2 = Second Qualifying Round
- R1 = Round 1
- R2 = Round 2
- R3 = Round 3
- R4 = Round 4
- R5 = Round 5
- R6 = Round 6
- QF = Quarter-finals
- SF = Semi-finals
- RU = Runners-up
- W = Winners

== Players (2024) ==
Note: Flags indicate national team as defined under FIFA eligibility rules; some limited exceptions apply. Players may hold more than one non-FIFA nationality.

No.	Pos.	Nation	Player
2	DF	THA	Samerpak Srinon
4	DF	THA	Jetsada Kaewsupan
5	MF	THA	Sumet Phonbamrung
6	MF	THA	Jetsada Cheendaung
7	MF	THA	Phuriwat Thongchai
8	FW	KOR	Choi Min-suk
9	FW	THA	Sathaphon Chueachan
10	FW	THA	Kunburus Sounses
11	FW	BRA	Mateus Antonio Ferraboli
13	MF	BRA	Victor Luis Ferreira Cabral
14	MF	THA	Chaipat Cheamsirijan
15	DF	THA	Natthaphon Puangtapitim
17	DF	THA	Wiroch Manoi
18	DF	THA	Thanawat Ruamrua

No.	Pos.	Nation	Player
19	MF	THA	Chirawat Faksuk
20	MF	THA	Chokthaboon Boonyakhet
21	MF	THA	Thodsawat Aunkongrat
22	MF	THA	Harinut Weerakinjphanich
23	MF	THA	Anucha Choimee
24	DF	THA	Anantasit Boonin
29	MF	THA	Rattanachai Nualkham
30	GK	THA	Wisanu Aunmuang
31	GK	THA	Thanakon Phomilbut
32	MF	THA	Sitthidet Tonodthong
33	MF	THA	Jedsadapkan Bunnak
36	DF	THA	Theerapan Chanhom
39	DF	THA	Thitikarn Rueangsuksud
46	DF	THA	Anucha Fansai
71	GK	THA	Supachai Muangsawan
