= Phatthalung Province Stadium =

Stadium in Thailand

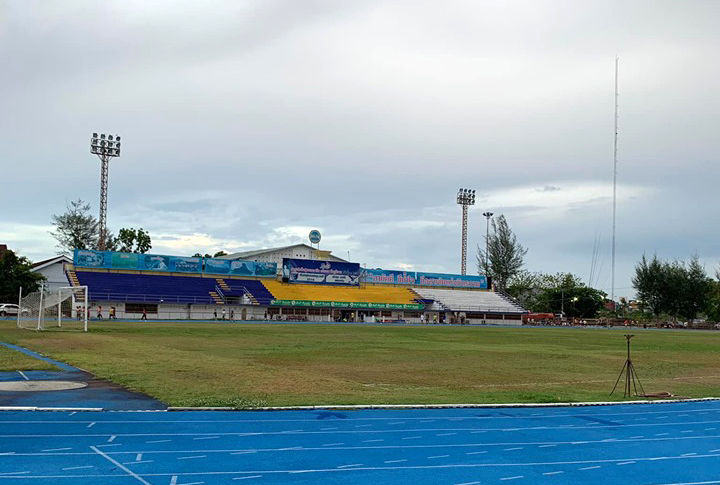
- Interactive map of Phatthalung Province Stadium
- Location: Phatthalung, Thailand
- Coordinates: 7°37′00″N 100°02′53″E
- Capacity: 4,021
- Surface: Grass

Tenant
- Phatthalung F.C. 2010

Phatthalung Province Stadium (Thai: สนามกีฬาจังหวัดพัทลุง or สนาม อบจ พัทลุง) is a multi-purpose stadium in Phatthalung Province, Thailand. It is currently used mostly for football matches and is the home stadium of Phatthalung F.C.
