= Phatthalung F.C. =

Thai football club

Phatthalung FC พัทลุง เอฟซี
- Full name: Phatthalung Football Club สโมสรฟุตบอลจังหวัดพัทลุง
- Nicknames: The Swiftlets (อีแอ่นเหินฟ้า) (อีแอ่นเจ้าเวหา)
- Founded: 1998; 28 years ago
- Ground: Phatthalung Province Stadium; Phatthalung, Thailand
- Capacity: 4,021
- Chairman: Kasemsak Sengsoon
- Coach: Maka Horprasartsuk
- League: Thailand Semi-pro League
- 2024–25: Thai League 3, 7th of 12 in the Southern region (administratively relegated)
Home colours	Away colours

Phatthalung Football Club (Thai: สโมสรฟุตบอลจังหวัดพัทลุง) is a Thai professional football club based in Phatthalung Province. The club is currently playing in the Thai League 3 Southern region.

== Timeline ==
History of events of Phatthalung Football Club:

Year	Important events
1998	The club is formed as Phatthalung Football Club, nicknamed The Swallows; Home games to be played at Phatthalung Stadium
2009	Club admitted to the Regional League South Division
2013	Leading as champion (1st) in Yamaha League One 2013.
2014	Pathalung FC 0 – 4 Kelantan FC.

In 2022, Phatthalung competed in the Thai League 3 for the 2022–23 season. It is their 7th season in the professional league. The club started the season with a 1–4 away defeat to MH Nakhon Si City and they ended the season with a 1–2 home defeat to MH Nakhon Si City. The club has finished 9th place in the league of the Southern region. In addition, in the 2022–23 Thai League Cup Phatthalung was penalty shoot-out defeated 1–4 by Young Singh Hatyai United in the second qualification round, causing them to be eliminated.

== Stadium and locations ==
Coordinates	Location	Stadium	Capacity	Year
7°37′00″N 100°02′53″E	Phatthalung	Phatthalung Province Stadium	4,021	2009–2019

== Seasons ==
Season	League									FA Cup	League Cup	T3 Cup	Top goalscorer league	
Season	Division	P	W	D	L	F	A	Pts	Pos	FA Cup	League Cup	T3 Cup	Name	Goals
2009	DIV2 South	14	2	3	9	10	30	9	7th	Opted out				
2010	DIV2 South	24	6	8	10	25	33	26	10th	Opted out	Opted out			
2011	DIV2 South	24	13	8	3	43	14	47	2nd	Opted out	Opted out			
2012	DIV1	34	7	13	14	38	59	34	15th	Opted out	Opted out		(Thailand) Siwapong Jarernsin	6
2013	DIV2 South	20	8	9	3	31	19	33	3rd	Opted out	Opted out			
2014	DIV2 South	22	3	8	11	23	35	17	11th	Opted out	Opted out			
2016	DIV2 South	22	7	6	9	23	30	27	8th	R1	QR1			
2017	T4 South	24	7	8	9	18	23	29	6th	R1	QR1		(Ivory Coast) Alimamy Haïdara Chérif	7
2018	T4 South	21	3	8	10	21	35	17	7th	QR	QR1		(Ghana) Obamoe Daniel	9
2019	T4 South	24	4	10	10	18	33	22	6th	Opted out	QFP		(Thailand) Teerawat Durnee	4
2020–21	T3 South	16	3	0	13	15	34	9	12th	Opted out	QR1		(Thailand) Anucha Lainkattawa	4
2021–22	T3 South	24	5	4	15	19	37	19	12th	Opted out	QR1		(Guinea) Conde Mamoudou (Thailand) Decha Whadtaen	4
2022–23	T3 South	22	5	9	8	24	33	24	9th	Opted out	QR2		(Ivory Coast) Alimamy Haïdara Chérif	7
2023–24	T3 South	22	14	6	2	56	15	48	2nd	R1	QR2	W	(Brazil) Jhonatan Bernardo	25
2024–25	T3 South	22	7	9	6	23	18	30	7th	Opted out	QR2	R16	(Brazil) Lucas Gaudencio Moraes	11

Champions	Runners-up	Promoted	Relegated

== Club officials ==
Position	Staff
Manager	(Thailand) Sirawut Ruangkaew
Head Coach	(Thailand) Piriya Chanpon
Assistant Coach	(Thailand) Kunanon Pinthongphan
Goalkeeper Coach	(Thailand) Phakorn Phuengla
Fitness Coach	(Thailand) Thanapon Phongthep
Team Staff	(Thailand) Phachara Anusuwan (Thailand) Sirawach Polpetch (Thailand) Ekapong Chumduang
Technical Director	(Japan) Takuya Jinno

== Players ==
=== Current squad ===
As of 5 October 2024

Note: Flags indicate national team as defined under FIFA eligibility rules; some limited exceptions apply. Players may hold more than one non-FIFA nationality.

No.	Pos.	Nation	Player
1	GK	THA	Surachat Suwannatanon
3	DF	THA	Thanakorn Tomuai
4	MF	THA	Wichitchai Chauyseenual
5	DF	THA	Eakaphong Thorchum
6	MF	THA	Aphisit Chuayklab
7	MF	THA	Teerawat Durnee
8	MF	THA	Thibet Suthok
9	FW	THA	Anucha Liankattawa
10	FW	THA	Thammayut Rakbun
11	FW	THA	Aitipol Kaewkeaw
17	MF	THA	Teerapat Kerdkunchon
18	GK	THA	Thanawat Wisetkhamin
19	FW	THA	Ratthaphon Intarachai

No.	Pos.	Nation	Player
20	DF	THA	Phanuphan Chankaew
22	FW	THA	Phanitan Rakboon
24	MF	THA	Phantep Chotikawin
25	MF	THA	Natthapong Maneesawang
26	GK	THA	Varit Mameen
27	DF	THA	Chokthawee Janthaphooree
31	FW	THA	Decha Hwattaen
32	FW	BRA	Erivelto
33	DF	BRA	Caio Silva
37	MF	THA	Kongpop Artserm
48	DF	THA	Sorasak Sukpakdee
70	FW	BRA	Faxinha
99	GK	THA	Pongsagorn Samattanared

== Honours ==
=== Domestic competitions ===
==== League ====
- Regional League Division 2 Southern
  - Runners-up (1) : 2011

==== Cups ====
- Thai League 3 Cup
  - Winners (1): 2023–24
