= Diogo Pereira (Brazilian footballer) =

Brazilian footballer (born 1990)

Personal information
- Full name: Diogo Junior Pereira
- Date of birth: 27 March 1990 (age 36)
- Place of birth: São Paulo, Brazil
- Height: 1.84 m (6 ft 0 in)
- Position: Forward

Team information
- Current team: Muang Trang United

Youth career
- 2007–2010: Palmeiras
- 2010: Guarani

Senior career*
Years	Team	Apps	(Gls)
2010	Guarani	14	(0)
2011	Comercial	0	(0)
2011–2013	Bragantino	2	(0)
2012	→ Santacruzense (loan)	0	(0)
2012	→ Noroeste (loan)	0	(0)
2013	Marília	0	(0)
2014	Novorizontino	0	(0)
2014	Grêmio Barueri	4	(0)
2015	→ Aimoré (loan)	0	(0)
2016	Rio Branco-SP	0	(0)
2016	Itabaiana	10	(0)
2017	J. Malucelli	0	(0)
2017–2018	Becamex Bình Dương	6	(3)
2018	SHB Đà Nẵng	13	(1)
2018–2019	Nam Định	33	(19)
2021–2022	Than Quảng Ninh	1	(0)
2023	Phuket Andaman	8	(4)
2024	Phitsanulok	11	(10)
2024–2025	Muang Trang United	22	(12)
2025–2026	Samut Sakhon City	24	(14)
2026–	Muang Trang United	0	(0)
- * Club domestic league appearances and goals as of 14 September 2019

Diogo Junior Pereira (born 27 March 1990) is a Brazilian footballer. He last played for Thai League 3 club Muang Trang United as a forward.

== Club career ==
Born in São Paulo, Pereira represented the under-17 team of Palmeiras as a youth. He joined Guarani academy in 2010, and made his professional debut with the senior team in the same year. He joined Clube Atlético Bragantino of Campeonato Brasileiro Série B in the following year. However he failed to break to the first team and to get more playing opportunities, he joined Associação Esportiva Santacruzense on loan. In 2012 playing for Santacruzense he impressed Noroeste scoring a brace while playing against. A few months later, he joined Noroeste on loan for the second half of year, scoring the winner goal on Copa Paulista final. In the following years, he continued to play for lower division clubs - Marília Atlético Clube, Grêmio Esportivo Novorizontino, Grêmio Barueri, Clube Esportivo Aimoré (loan), Itabaina amongst others.

On 8 June 2017, Pereira moved abroad and signed for Vietnamese club Becamex Binh Duong. On 2018, Pereira moved abroad and signed for different Vietnamese club SHB Da Nang.
