= Trang F.C. =

Thai football club

Trang FC ตรัง เอฟซี
- Full name: Trang Football Club สโมสรฟุตบอลจังหวัดตรัง
- Nicknames: The Killer Dugongs (พะยูนพิฆาต)
- Short name: TRNGFC
- Founded: 2010; 16 years ago
- Ground: Trang Municipality Stadium; Trang, Thailand
- Capacity: 4,789
- Chairman: Thawan Phromma
- Manager: Preecha Tansai
- Coach: Phuwanart Saengsri
- League: Thailand Semi-pro League
- 2023–24: Thai League 3, 12th of 12 in the Southern region (relegated)
| Home colours | Away colours |

Trang Football Club (Thai สโมสรฟุตบอลจังหวัดตรัง ) is a Thai semi-professional football club based in Trang Province. The club is currently playing in the Thai League 3 Southern region.

== Timeline ==
History of events of Trang Football Club:

| Year | Important events |
|---|---|
| 2009 | The club is formed as Trang Football Club, nicknamed The Killer Dugongs; Club admitted to the Regional League Southern Division; Home games to be played at Trang Stadium; Chaiwat Suntornnont named as the first ever coach of Trang; Finished 2nd in Southern Division and qualified for the Division 2 Champions League; Finished last in their Champions League group |

In 2022, Trang competed in the Thai League 3 for the 2022–23 season. It is their 13th season in the professional league. The club started the season with a 1–0 home win over Jalor City and they ended the season with a 0–2 away defeat to Jalor City. The club has finished 11th place in the league of the Southern region. In addition, in the 2022–23 Thai League Cup Trang was defeated 1–6 by MH Nakhon Si City in the first qualification round, causing them to be eliminated.

== Honours ==
=== Domestic leagues ===
- Regional League South Division
  - Winners (1) : 2012
  - Runners-up (1) : 2010

== Stadium and locations ==
| Coordinates | Location | Stadium | Capacity | Year |
|---|---|---|---|---|
| 7°33′12″N 99°36′55″E | Trang | Trang Municipality Stadium | 4,789 | 2010–2017 |

== Seasons ==
| Season | League | | | | | | | | | FA Cup | League Cup | T3 Cup | Top goalscorer | |
| Season | Division | P | W | D | L | F | A | Pts | Pos | FA Cup | League Cup | T3 Cup | Name | Goals |
|---|---|---|---|---|---|---|---|---|---|---|---|---|---|---|
| 2010 | South | 24 | 11 | 8 | 5 | 30 | 23 | 41 | 2nd | Opted out | R1 | | | |
| 2011 | South | 24 | 5 | 9 | 10 | 33 | 36 | 24 | 11th | R1 | R3 | | | |
| 2012 | South | 20 | 13 | 6 | 1 | 40 | 13 | 45 | 1st | Opted out | Opted out | | | |
| 2013 | South | 20 | 3 | 12 | 5 | 14 | 18 | 21 | 8th | QR2 | R2 | | | |
| 2014 | South | 24 | 13 | 9 | 2 | 36 | 20 | 48 | 3rd | R2 | R2 | | | |
| 2015 | South | 18 | 7 | 4 | 7 | 21 | 17 | 25 | 4th | Opted out | R1 | | | |
| 2016 | South | 22 | 10 | 5 | 7 | 29 | 25 | 35 | 3rd | Opted out | Opted out | | | |
| 2017 | T3 Lower | 28 | 19 | 4 | 5 | 47 | 19 | 61 | 2nd | Opted out | R1 | | (Brazil) Douglas Lopes Carneiro | 13 |
| 2018 | T3 Lower | 26 | 14 | 8 | 4 | 34 | 16 | 50 | 3rd | Opted out | R2 | | (Brazil) Douglas Lopes Carneiro | 9 |
| 2019 | T3 Lower | 26 | 11 | 8 | 7 | 31 | 27 | 41 | 4th | Opted out | QR2 | | (Brazil) Willian Sarôa de Souza | 5 |
| 2020–21 | T3 South | 16 | 7 | 5 | 4 | 19 | 13 | 26 | 6th | Opted out | Opted out | | (Thailand) Phuchakhen Chandaeng | 7 |
| 2021–22 | T3 South | 24 | 10 | 9 | 5 | 27 | 20 | 39 | 6th | Opted out | Opted out | | (Thailand) Arnon Panmeethong | 6 |
| 2022–23 | T3 South | 22 | 6 | 3 | 13 | 25 | 54 | 21 | 11th | Opted out | QR1 | | (South Korea) Han Youn-soo | 4 |
| 2023–24 | T3 South | 22 | 3 | 3 | 16 | 8 | 58 | 12 | 12th | Opted out | Opted out | Opted out | (Brazil) Tiago Severino da Silva (Thailand) Abdulvaris Piansakul | 2 |

| Champions | Runners-up | Third place | Promoted | Relegated |

- P = Played
- W = Games won
- D = Games drawn
- L = Games lost
- F = Goals for
- A = Goals against
- Pts = Points
- Pos = Final position
- TPL = Thai Premier League
- QR1 = First Qualifying Round
- QR2 = Second Qualifying Round
- QR3 = Third Qualifying Round
- QR4 = Fourth Qualifying Round
- RInt = Intermediate Round
- R1 = Round 1
- R2 = Round 2
- R3 = Round 3
- R4 = Round 4
- R5 = Round 5
- R6 = Round 6
- GR = Group stage
- QF = Quarter-finals
- SF = Semi-finals
- RU = Runners-up
- S = Shared
- W = Winners

== Players ==
=== Current squad ===
As of 2 January 2022

Note: Flags indicate national team as defined under FIFA eligibility rules; some limited exceptions apply. Players may hold more than one non-FIFA nationality.

| No. | Pos. | Nation | Player |
|---|---|---|---|
| 2 | DF | THA | Suttirak Tongkaew |
| 5 | DF | THA | Eakaphong Thorchum |
| 7 | MF | THA | Keradit Borimart |
| 10 | MF | KOR | Han Yun Soo |
| 11 | MF | TGA | Ata Inia |
| 14 | DF | THA | Arnon Panmeethong |
| 16 | MF | THA | Aphisit Chuayklab |
| 18 | DF | THA | Nathan Rongdet |
| 21 | MF | THA | Hafeedeen Maliwan |
| 23 | GK | THA | Teeranan Wantahla |
| 26 | FW | THA | Thirawat Thongruang |
| 27 | DF | THA | Nattha Thongrod |

| No. | Pos. | Nation | Player |
|---|---|---|---|
| 29 | GK | THA | Suranrat Suwannarat |
| 32 | FW | THA | Phuchakhen Chandaeng |
| 33 | DF | THA | Kridsada Limseeput |
| 34 | MF | THA | Songkrod Phongkijcharoen |
| 38 | MF | THA | Ridwan Ruangchuai |
| 39 | GK | THA | Nattapong Thongpum |
| 71 | DF | THA | Sitthichai Chimrueang |
| 80 | MF | THA | Sarawut Talungphat |
| 88 | DF | IRN | Sadegh Eskandarikhanghahi |
| 90 | FW | THA | Patikorn Saetia |
| 98 | FW | THA | Wutthipong Kerdkul |
