= Muang Trang United F.C. =

Muang Trang United เมืองตรัง ยูไนเต็ด
- Full name: Muang Trang United Football Club
- Nicknames: The Andaman horses (อาชาอันดามัน)
- Short name: MTU
- Founded: 2022; 4 years ago
- Ground: Muang Trang Stadium; Trang, Thailand
- Capacity: 2,200
- Coordinates: 7°48′08″N 99°35′18″E
- Owner(s): Muang Trang United 2022 Co., Ltd.
- Chairman: Sanae Thongsak
- Head coach: Yai Nilwong
- League: Thai League 3
- 2025–26: Thai League 3, 6th of 10 in the Southern region
- Website: https://web.facebook.com/muangtrangunited

Muang Trang United Football Club (Thai สโมสรฟุตบอล เมืองตรัง ยูไนเต็ด), is a Thai football club based in Mueang, Trang, Thailand. The club is currently playing in the Thai League 3 Southern region.

== History ==
In early 2022, the club was established and competed in Thailand Amateur League Southern region, using the Trang Municipality Stadium as the ground. At the end of the season, the club could be promoted to the Thai League 3 as the Thailand Amateur League runners-up. They use the Trang Municipality Stadium as a ground to compete for the T3 in the 2022–23 season.

In late 2022, Muang Trang United competed in the Thai League 3 for the 2022–23 season. It is their first season in the professional league. The club started the season with a 0–1 away defeated to Phuket Andaman and they ended the season with a 2–1 home win over the Phuket Andaman. The club has finished seventh place in the league of the Southern region. In addition, in the 2022–23 Thai League Cup Muang Trang United was defeated 0–1 by Songkhla in the second qualification round, causing them to be eliminated.

== Stadium and locations ==
Coordinates	Location	Stadium	Capacity	Year
7°33′12″N 99°36′57″E	Trang	Trang Municipality Stadium	4,769	2022 – 2024
7°48′08″N 99°35′18″E	Trang	Muang Trang Stadium	2,200	2024 –

== Season by season record ==
Season	League									FA Cup	League Cup	T3 Cup	Top goalscorer	
Season	Division	P	W	D	L	F	A	Pts	Pos	FA Cup	League Cup	T3 Cup	Name	Goals
2022	TA South	4	3	1	0	7	3	10	1st	Opted out	Ineligible		(Thailand) Phuket Fueangkhon	3
2022–23	T3 South	22	7	7	8	23	28	28	7th	Opted out	QR2		(Thailand) Somprat Ruangnoon	5
2023–24	T3 South	22	9	6	7	24	18	33	5th	QR	QR2	QR2	(Thailand) Ittipon Khampliw	4
2024–25	T3 South	22	8	8	6	34	28	32	6th	R1	R2	LP	(Brazil) Diogo Pereira	16
2025–26	T3 South	18	7	5	6	32	24	26	6th	Opted out	QR1	LP	(Brazil) Edson dos Santos Costa Júnior	10
2026–27	T3 South										QR1			

Champions	Runners-up	Promoted	Relegated

- P = Played
- W = Games won
- D = Games drawn
- L = Games lost
- F = Goals for
- A = Goals against
- Pts = Points
- Pos = Final position
- QR1 = First Qualifying Round
- QR2 = Second Qualifying Round
- R1 = Round 1
- R2 = Round 2
- R3 = Round 3
- R4 = Round 4
- R5 = Round 5
- R6 = Round 6
- QF = Quarter-finals
- SF = Semi-finals
- RU = Runners-up
- W = Winners

== Players ==
=== Current squad ===
As of 31 August 2026

Note: Flags indicate national team as defined under FIFA eligibility rules; some limited exceptions apply. Players may hold more than one non-FIFA nationality.

No.	Pos.	Nation	Player
2	DF	THA	Suttirak Tongkaew
5	MF	THA	Narongrit Wongsila
6	MF	THA	Aittipol Panadee
7	MF	THA	Rattasart Makasoot
8	MF	THA	Akarat Punkaew
9	FW	THA	Nattapoom Maya
10	FW	ARG	Cristián Ivanobski
13	MF	THA	Sattaporn Suso
14	DF	THA	Arnon Panmeethong (Captain)
15	DF	BRA	Lucas Daubermann
16	DF	THA	Punn Vajrabhaya
17	MF	THA	Chananon Wisetbamrungcharoen
18	GK	THA	Sittidet Pakdee

No.	Pos.	Nation	Player
19	FW	THA	Muhammad-Erawan Duerem
31	GK	THA	Natthawut Paengkrathok
32	FW	THA	Phuchakhen Chandaeng
33	DF	THA	Kridsada Limseeput
37	DF	THA	Aekkaphon Fangnongdu
38	MF	THA	Kulthawat Buachroen
40	GK	THA	Sornnarai Chamrurai
46	GK	THA	Kriangsak Numnuan
55	DF	THA	Aorachun Changmoung
70	MF	THA	Peerapong Panyanumaporn
90	FW	BRA	Diogo Pereira
91	MF	THA	Nattadat Thawisuk
92	FW	THA	Aphisit Nunthong

== Coaching Staff & Club personnel ==
Position	Name
Chairman	(Thailand) Sanae Thongsak
Vice-Chairman	(Thailand) Bunyaluk Onchuenjit
Owners & Directors	(Thailand) Weerayut Narncha
Team Manager	(Thailand) Phatthapong Rakrawi
Head coach	(Thailand) Yai Nilwong
Assistant coach	(Thailand) Sakkayat Sangkhaphan (Thailand) Kitti Rakrawi
Goalkeeper coach	(Thailand) Teerapong Phutthasukha
Fitness coach	(Thailand) Taweeechai Meejei
Technical & Analysis Director	(Thailand) Sakkayot Sangkhaphan

== Honours ==
=== Domestic competitions ===
==== League ====
- Thailand Amateur League
  - Runners-up (1): 2022
