= 2018 Thai League 4 Champions League =

Thai League 4 Champions League

The champions league round was the next stage from the regional stage of 2018 Thai League 4. The winners of each regions, the runners-up of some regions, and the winners of qualifying play-off would qualified to this round to finding 3 clubs promoting to 2019 Thai League 3.

== Teams ==
Locations of the 2018 Thai League 4 Champions League Teams
Upper Region
Lower Region
Eliminated in qualification play-off
(p) Qualifying play-off participants

| Team | Qualifying method |
Group stage direct entrants
| Uttaradit | Northern region champions |
| Muang Loei United | Northeastern region champions |
| Khon Kaen United | Northeastern region runners-up |
| Bankhai United | Eastern region champions |
| Chanthaburi | Eastern region runners-up |
| Nakhon Pathom United | Western region champions |
| IPE Samut Sakhon United | Western region runners-up |
| Satun United | Southern region champions |
| North Bangkok University | Bangkok Metropolitan region champions |
Qualifying play-off participants
Entering in play-off round
| Nan | Northern region runners-up |
| Huahin City | Western region runners-up |
| Pattani | Southern region runners-up |
| Grakcu Saimai United | Bangkok Metropolitan region third place (Note: Bangkok United (B) was the runners-up of Bangkok Metropolitan region but cannot promoted to champions league round by the rule of FA Thailand about reserve team. So, the next place of Bangkok Metropolitan region would promoted to champions league qualifying play-off participants.) |
Entering in preliminary round
| Yasothon | Northeastern region third place |
| Pluakdaeng Rayong United | Eastern region third place |
| Hatyai | Southern region third place |
| BGC | Bangkok Metropolitan region fourth place (Note: Bangkok United (B) was the runners-up of Bangkok Metropolitan region but cannot promoted to champions league round by the rule of FA Thailand about reserve team. So, the next place of Bangkok Metropolitan region would promoted to champions league qualifying play-off participants.) |

== Qualifying play-offs ==
Upper region

| Preliminary round | | Play-off round |
| | | Nan | 0 |
| Yasothon | 2 | Yasothon | 1 |
| Pluakdaeng Rayong United | 1 |

Lower region

| Preliminary round | Play-off round |
| | Grakcu Saimai United (a.e.t.) | 2 |
| | Pattani | 1 |

| Preliminary round | | Play-off round |
| | | BGC | 0 |
| BGC | 2 | Huahin City | 1 |
| Hatyai | 1 |

=== Preliminary round ===
| Team 1 | Score | Team 2 |
Upper region
| Yasothon | 2–1 | Pluakdaeng Rayong United |
Lower region
| BGC | 2–1 | Hatyai |

Upper region

2 September 2018
16:00 UTC+7

| Yasothon | 2–1 | Pluakdaeng Rayong United |
|---|---|---|
| Diop Badara Aly 72'; Pattanapong Chumchan 81' | Report | Jettarin Phetborisut 26' |

Ayutthaya Provincial Stadium, Ayutthaya
Attendance: 1,200
Referee: Teeramet Phuprang (Thailand)

Lower region

1 September 2018
16:00 UTC+7

| BGC | 2–1 | Hatyai |
|---|---|---|
| Thammayut Rakbun 58'; Pongrawit Jantawong 77' (pen.) | Report | Amorn Mudlied 80' |

Huahin Municipality Stadium, Prachuap Khiri Khan
Attendance: 170
Referee: Kittipong Choolert (Thailand)

=== Play-off round ===
| Team 1 | Score | Team 2 |
Upper region
| Nan | 0–1 | Yasothon |
Lower region
| Grakcu Saimai United | 2–1 (a.e.t.) | Pattani |
| BGC | 0–1 | Huahin City |

Upper region

9 September 2018
16:00 UTC+7

| Nan | 0–1 | Yasothon |
|---|---|---|
| | Report | Otis Sarfo Adjei 90+10' |

Angthong Provincial Stadium, Angthong
Attendance: 315
Referee: Suchin Khiewsopa (Thailand)

Lower region

2 September 2018
16:00 UTC+7

| Grakcu Saimai United | 2–1 (a.e.t.) | Pattani |
|---|---|---|
| Krittanon Thanachotjareanphon 71', 120+3' (pen.) | Report | Chatchai Maneewan 90+4' (o.g.) |

Bangkokthonburi University Stadium, Bangkok
Attendance: 450
Referee: Chaiya Mulmanee (Thailand)
8 September 2018
16:00 UTC+7

| BGC | 0–1 | Huahin City |
|---|---|---|
| | Report | Songkran Puangnoy 58' |

Sam Ao Stadium, Prachuap Khiri Khan
Attendance: 100
Referee: Anusorn Saengnet (Thailand)

== Group stage ==
=== Upper region ===
| Pos | Team | Pld | W | D | L | GF | GA | GD | Pts | Qualification | KKU | MLU | BKU | YST | CTB | UDT |
|---|---|---|---|---|---|---|---|---|---|---|---|---|---|---|---|---|
| 1 | Khon Kaen United (P) | 5 | 4 | 1 | 0 | 6 | 2 | +4 | 13 | Final | — | — | 1–0 | — | 1–0 | — |
| 2 | Muang Loei United | 5 | 2 | 3 | 0 | 5 | 3 | +2 | 9 | Third place play-off | 0–0 | — | — | 2–2 | — | 1–0 |
| 3 | Bankhai United | 5 | 2 | 1 | 2 | 7 | 6 | +1 | 7 | | — | 0–0 | — | 1–2 | 3–2 | — |
| 4 | Yasothon | 5 | 1 | 2 | 2 | 5 | 7 | −2 | 5 | | 1–2 | — | — | — | 0–2 | — |
| 5 | Chanthaburi | 5 | 1 | 1 | 3 | 6 | 7 | −1 | 4 | | — | 1–2 | — | — | — | 1–1 |
| 6 | Uttaradit | 5 | 0 | 2 | 3 | 3 | 7 | −4 | 2 | | 1–2 | — | 1–3 | 0–0 | — | — |

Source: Thai League 4
Rules for classification: 1) Points; 2) Overall goals difference; 3) Overall goals scored; 4) Fair play points; 5) Play-off without extra time;).
(P) Promoted
15 September 2018
16:00 UTC+7

| Bankhai United | 0–0 | Muang Loei United |
|---|---|---|
| | Report |

Wai Krong Stadium, Rayong
Attendance: 320
Referee: Usen Yala (Thailand)
15 September 2018
16:00 UTC+7

| Yasothon | 0–2 | Chanthaburi |
|---|---|---|
| | Report | Tripop Jaroensheep 84'; Chainarong Samuttha 87' |

Yasothon Provincial Stadium, Yasothon
Attendance: 2,360
Referee: Pisit Bunthongpaeng (Thailand)
15 September 2018
18:00 UTC+7

| Uttaradit | 1–2 | Khon Kaen United |
|---|---|---|
| Kritnapop Mekputcharakul 45+1' | Report | Tebnimit Buransri 7'; Charin Buthad 83' |

Uttaradit Provincial Stadium, Uttaradit
Attendance: 915
Referee: Suphat Chaingam (Thailand)

23 September 2018
16:00 UTC+7

| Muang Loei United | 0–0 | Khon Kaen United |
|---|---|---|
| | Report |

Wang Saphung Stadium, Loei
Attendance: 1,254
Referee: Sittichai Saramai (Thailand)
23 September 2018
16:00 UTC+7

| Bankhai United | 3–2 | Chanthaburi |
|---|---|---|
| Chokchai Sukthed 58'; Piya Kruawan 61'; Camara Souleymane 78' | Report | Tanakit Wonglikit 76' (o.g.); Chainarong Samuttha 86' |

Wai Krong Stadium, Rayong
Attendance: 200
Referee: Yutthana Sadkratok (Thailand)
23 September 2018
18:00 UTC+7

| Uttaradit | 0–0 | Yasothon |
|---|---|---|
| | Report |

Uttaradit Provincial Stadium, Uttaradit
Attendance: 660
Referee: Sakda Jitsupaworakul (Thailand)

29 September 2018
16:00 UTC+7

| Muang Loei United | 2–2 | Yasothon |
|---|---|---|
| Abass Ouro-Nimini 22'; Chawin Thirawatsri 44' | Report | Pattanapong Chumchan 31'; Vichit Singloilom 64' |

Wang Saphung Stadium, Loei
Attendance: 539
Referee: Teeramet Phuprang (Thailand)
29 September 2018
18:00 UTC+7

| Chanthaburi | 1–1 | Uttaradit |
|---|---|---|
| Ozor Enoch 52' | Report | Diarra Aboubacar Sidick 78' |

Chanthaburi Provincial Stadium, Chanthaburi
Attendance: 480
Referee: Teerachai Jampa (Thailand)
30 September 2018
18:00 UTC+7

| Khon Kaen United | 1–0 | Bankhai United |
|---|---|---|
| Tebnimit Buransri 21' | Report |

Khonkaen PAO. Stadium, Khonkaen
Attendance: 5,473
Referee: Puttipong Isising (Thailand)

7 October 2018
16:00 UTC+7

| Yasothon | 1–2 | Khon Kaen United |
|---|---|---|
| Vichit Singloilom 22' | Report | Charin Buthad 60'; Jardel Capistrano 76' |

Yasothon Provincial Stadium, Yasothon
Attendance: 2,595
Referee: Sakda Jitsupaworakul (Thailand)
7 October 2018
18:00 UTC+7

| Chanthaburi | 1–2 | Muang Loei United |
|---|---|---|
| Chainarong Samuttha 90+3' (pen.) | Report | Yongyut Jareonpoom 8' (o.g.); Panadon Lexsuwan 55' (o.g.) |

Chanthaburi Provincial Stadium, Chanthaburi
Attendance: 825
Referee: Ekkachai Phetcham (Thailand)
7 October 2018
18:00 UTC+7

| Uttaradit | 1–3 | Bankhai United |
|---|---|---|
| Patipat Kamsat 57' | Report | Elvis Job 74'; Piya Kruawan 83'; Kaikitti Inuthen 90+4' (pen.) |

Uttaradit Provincial Stadium, Uttaradit
Attendance: 230
Referee: Seksan Punsri (Thailand)

13 October 2018
16:00 UTC+7

| Bankhai United | 1–2 | Yasothon |
|---|---|---|
| Kaikitti Inuthen 27' | Report | Diop Badara Aly 57', 62' |

Wai Krong Stadium, Rayong
Attendance: 300
Referee: Peerasan Krataithong (Thailand)
13 October 2018
16:00 UTC+7

| Muang Loei United | 1–0 | Uttaradit |
|---|---|---|
| André Houma Ekue 27' | Report |

Wang Saphung Stadium, Loei
Attendance: 509
Referee: Noppadech Muangngam (Thailand)
13 October 2018
16:00 UTC+7

| Khon Kaen United | 1–0 | Chanthaburi |
|---|---|---|
| Jardel Capistrano 57' | Report |

Khonkaen PAO. Stadium, Khonkaen
Attendance: 3,876
Referee: Jeerawich Pornkaew (Thailand)

=== Lower region ===
| Pos | Team | Pld | W | D | L | GF | GA | GD | Pts | Qualification | NPU | NBU | STU | HHC | GSU | ISU |
|---|---|---|---|---|---|---|---|---|---|---|---|---|---|---|---|---|
| 1 | Nakhon Pathom United (P) | 5 | 4 | 0 | 1 | 9 | 2 | +7 | 12 | Final | — | 1–0 | — | 3–1 | — | 4–0 |
| 2 | North Bangkok University (P) | 5 | 3 | 1 | 1 | 15 | 4 | +11 | 10 (Note: North Bangkok University ahead on head-to-head record; North Bangkok University 3 pts, Satun United 0 pts.) | Third place play-off | — | — | 6–1 | 0–0 | — | — |
| 3 | Satun United | 5 | 3 | 1 | 1 | 17 | 10 | +7 | 10 | | 1–0 | — | — | — | 1–1 | 8–2 |
| 4 | Huahin City | 5 | 2 | 1 | 2 | 4 | 9 | −5 | 7 | | — | — | 1–6 | — | 1–0 | 1–0 |
| 5 | Grakcu Saimai United | 5 | 0 | 2 | 3 | 2 | 10 | −8 | 2 | | 0–1 | 1–7 | — | — | — | — |
| 6 | IPE Samut Sakhon United | 5 | 0 | 1 | 4 | 3 | 15 | −12 | 1 | | — | 1–2 | — | — | 0–0 | — |

Source: Thai League 4
Rules for classification: 1) Points; 2) Overall goals difference; 3) Overall goals scored; 4) Fair play points; 5) Play-off without extra time;).
(P) Promoted
Notes:
16 September 2018
16:00 UTC+7

| IPE Samut Sakhon United | 1–2 | North Bangkok University |
|---|---|---|
| Kissi Koffi Ludovic Loic 18' | Report | Maranhão 3', 7' |

IPE Samut Sakhon Stadium, Samut Sakhon
Attendance: 200
Referee: Jaran Chan-aem (Thailand)
16 September 2018
16:00 UTC+7

| Satun United | 1–1 | Grakcu Saimai United |
|---|---|---|
| Martins Caio Henrique 38' (pen.) | Report | Rattikun Plonghirun 21' |

Satun PAO. Stadium, Satun
Attendance: 4,200
Referee: Matohar Sahyoh (Thailand)
16 September 2018
18:00 UTC+7

| Nakhon Pathom United | 3–1 | Huahin City |
|---|---|---|
| Chokchai Chuchai 4'; Olveira Silva Diego 48', 78' | Report | Panudach Subpeng 19' |

Nakhon Pathom Municipality Sport School Stadium, Nakhon Pathom
Attendance: 1,258
Referee: Kittipong Chulert (Thailand)

22 September 2018
16:00 UTC+7

| Satun United | 8–2 | IPE Samut Sakhon United |
|---|---|---|
| Martins Caio Henrique 9', 45+1', 50'; Chamsuddeen Shoteng 17', 54'; Fabricio Marabá 53'; Thirawat Lertpitchapatch 79'; Natthawut Munsuwan 89' | Report | Pantakan Kasemkulwirai 65'; Phethai Sa-ngiamsak 85' |

Satun PAO. Stadium, Satun
Attendance: 3,000
Referee: Worakrit Panyu (Thailand)
22 September 2018
17:30 UTC+7

| Huahin City | 1–0 | Grakcu Saimai United |
|---|---|---|
| Chatchai Phithanmet 90+2' | Report |

Huahin Municipality Stadium, Prachuap Khiri Khan
Attendance: 200
Referee: Panupong Netrat (Thailand)
22 September 2018
18:00 UTC+7

| Nakhon Pathom United | 1–0 | North Bangkok University |
|---|---|---|
| Saeid Chahjouei 27' | Report |

Nakhon Pathom Municipality Sport School Stadium, Nakhon Pathom
Attendance: 1,577
Referee: Anusorn Saengnet (Thailand)

30 September 2018
16:00 UTC+7

| Grakcu Saimai United | 0–1 | Nakhon Pathom United |
|---|---|---|
| | Report | Wisarut Pannasi 16' |

Grakcu Saimai Stadium, Bangkok
Attendance: 450
Referee: Satchukorn Saenchu (Thailand)
30 September 2018
16:00 UTC+7

| North Bangkok University | 6–1 | Satun United |
|---|---|---|
| Poomipat Kantanet 53'; João Francisco 55', 75', 89'; Maranhão 60', 85' | Report | Thanakorn Sathanpong 90+2' |

North Bangkok University Stadium, Pathum Thani
Attendance: 885
Referee: Sakda Jitsupaworakul (Thailand)
30 September 2018
17:30 UTC+7

| Huahin City | 1–0 | IPE Samut Sakhon United |
|---|---|---|
| Chatchai Phithanmet 35' | Report |

Huahin Municipality Stadium, Prachuap Khiri Khan
Attendance: 185
Referee: Anusorn Saengnet (Thailand)

6 October 2018
16:00 UTC+7

| IPE Samut Sakhon United | 0–0 | Grakcu Saimai United |
|---|---|---|
| | Report |

IPE Samut Sakhon Stadium, Samut Sakhon
Attendance: 100
Referee: Teerachai Jampa (Thailand)
6 October 2018
16:00 UTC+7

| North Bangkok University | 0–0 | Huahin City |
|---|---|---|
| | Report |

North Bangkok University Stadium, Pathum Thani
Attendance: 400
Referee: Apidech Wongsa (Thailand)
6 October 2018
16:00 UTC+7

| Satun United | 1–0 | Nakhon Pathom United |
|---|---|---|
| Natthawut Munsuwan 47' | Report |

Satun PAO. Stadium, Satun
Attendance: 5,000
Referee: Pongphat Kaewbaworn (Thailand)

14 October 2018
16:00 UTC+7

| Grakcu Saimai United | 1–7 | North Bangkok University |
|---|---|---|
| Samart Phetnoo 45+1' (pen.) | Report | Maranhão 21', 73'; Chanukun Karin 26', 83', 90+1'; Poomipat Kantanet 70', 76' |

Grakcu Saimai Stadium, Bangkok
Attendance: 199
Referee: Seksan Punsri (Thailand)
14 October 2018
16:00 UTC+7

| Huahin City | 1–6 | Satun United |
|---|---|---|
| Anon Kaimook 61' (pen.) | Report | Chamsuddeen Shoteng 10', 19' (pen.), 44'; Manso Ausman 12'; Natthawut Munsuwan 67', 83' |

Huahin Municipality Stadium, Prachuap Khiri Khan
Attendance: 300
Referee: Apidech Wongsa (Thailand)
14 October 2018
16:00 UTC+7

| Nakhon Pathom United | 4–0 | IPE Samut Sakhon United |
|---|---|---|
| Olveira Silva Diego 15', 30' (pen.); Nakun Phintong 42'; Lesley Ablorh 90+1' | Report |

Nakhon Pathom Municipality Sport School Stadium, Nakhon Pathom
Attendance: 1,325
Referee: Ekkachai Phetcham (Thailand)

== Knockout stage ==
Winners, runners-up, and third place of 2018 Thai League 4 would promoted to 2019 Thai League 3.

=== Third place play-off ===
==== Summary ====
| Team 1 | Agg. | Team 2 | 1st leg | 2nd leg |
|---|---|---|---|---|
| North Bangkok University | 2–1 | Muang Loei United | 1–1 | 1–0 |

==== Matches ====
20 October 2018
16:00 UTC+7

| North Bangkok University | 1–1 | Muang Loei United |
|---|---|---|
| João Francisco 57' | Report | Krit Phavaputanon 90+4' |

North Bangkok University Stadium, Pathum Thani
Attendance: 650
Referee: Athiwat Seelalo (Thailand)
27 October 2018
15:00 UTC+7

| Muang Loei United | 0–1 | North Bangkok University |
|---|---|---|
| | Report | Poomipat Kantanet 66' |

Wang Saphung Stadium, Loei
Attendance: 740
Referee: Chairoek Ngamsom (Thailand)

North Bangkok University won 2–1 on aggregate.

=== Final ===
==== Summary ====
| Team 1 | Agg. | Team 2 | 1st leg | 2nd leg |
|---|---|---|---|---|
| Khon Kaen United | 4–5 | Nakhon Pathom United | 2–2 | 2–3 |

==== Matches ====
21 October 2018
18:00 UTC+7

| Khon Kaen United | 2–2 | Nakhon Pathom United |
|---|---|---|
| Charin Buthad 61'; Jardel Capistrano 86' | Report | Nattaphon Worasut 79'; Pongsathon Tongchaum 90+4' |

Khonkaen PAO. Stadium, Khonkaen
Attendance: 4,291
Referee: Teetichai Nualchan (Thailand)
28 October 2018
18:00 UTC+7

| Nakhon Pathom United | 3–2 | Khon Kaen United |
|---|---|---|
| Nakun Phintong 16'; Olveira Silva Diego 25'; Pongsathon Tongchaum 36' | Report | Jardel Capistrano 28', 57' (pen.) |

Nakhon Pathom Municipality Sport School Stadium, Nakhon Pathom
Attendance: 2,566
Referee: Songkran Boonmeekiat (Thailand)

Nakhon Pathom United won 5–4 on aggregate.

== Teams promoted to 2019 Thai League 3 ==
- Nakhon Pathom United (champions)
- Khon Kaen United (runners-up)
- North Bangkok University (Third-placed)

== Goalscorers ==
6 goals

- (Brazil) Maranhão (North Bangkok University)

5 goals

- (Brazil) Jardel Capistrano (Khon Kaen United)
- (Brazil) Olveira Silva Diego (Nakhon Pathom United)
- (Thailand) Chamsuddeen Shoteng (Satun United)

4 goals

- (Brazil) João Francisco (North Bangkok University)
- (Thailand) Poomipat Kantanet (North Bangkok University)
- (Brazil) Martins Caio Henrique (Satun United)
- (Thailand) Natthawut Munsuwan (Satun United)

3 goals

- (Thailand) Chainarong Samuttha (Chanthaburi)
- (Thailand) Charin Buthad (Khon Kaen United)
- (Thailand) Chanukun Karin (North Bangkok University)
- (Guinea) Diop Badara Aly (Yasothon)

2 goals

- (Thailand) Kaikitti Inuthen (Bankhai United)
- (Thailand) Piya Kruawan (Bankhai United)
- (Thailand) Krittanon Thanachotjareanphon (Grakcu Saimai United)
- (Thailand) Chatchai Phithanmet (Huahin City)
- (Thailand) Tebnimit Buransri (Khon Kaen United)
- (Thailand) Nakun Phintong (Nakhon Pathom United)
- (Thailand) Pongsathon Tongchaum (Nakhon Pathom United)
- (Thailand) Pattanapong Chumchan (Yasothon)
- (Thailand) Vichit Singloilom (Yasothon)

1 goal

- (Ivory Coast) Camara Souleymane (Bankhai United)
- (Thailand) Chokchai Sukthed (Bankhai United)
- (Cameroon) Elvis Job (Bankhai United)
- (Thailand) Pongrawit Jantawong (BGC)
- (Thailand) Thammayut Rakbun (BGC)
- (Ghana) Ozor Enoch (Chanthaburi)
- (Thailand) Tripop Jaroensheep (Chanthaburi)
- (Thailand) Rattikun Plonghirun (Grakcu Saimai United)
- (Thailand) Samart Phetnoo (Grakcu Saimai United)
- (Thailand) Amorn Mudlied (Hatyai)
- (Thailand) Anon Kaimook (Huahin City)
- (Thailand) Panudach Subpeng (Huahin City)
- (Thailand) Songkran Puangnoy (Huahin City)
- (Ivory Coast) Kissi Koffi Ludovic Loic (IPE Samut Sakhon United)
- (Thailand) Pantakan Kasemkulwirai (IPE Samut Sakhon United)
- (Thailand) Phethai Sa-ngiamsak (IPE Samut Sakhon United)
- (Togo) Abass Ouro-Nimini (Muang Loei United)
- (Togo) André Houma Ekue (Muang Loei United)
- (Thailand) Chawin Thirawatsri (Muang Loei United)
- (Thailand) Krit Phavaputanon (Muang Loei United)
- (Thailand) Chokchai Chuchai (Nakhon Pathom United)
- (Ghana) Lesley Ablorh (Nakhon Pathom United)
- (Thailand) Nattaphon Worasut (Nakhon Pathom United)
- (Iran) Saeid Chahjouei (Nakhon Pathom United)
- (Thailand) Wisarut Pannasi (Nakhon Pathom United)
- (Thailand) Jettarin Phetborisut (Pluakdaeng Rayong United)
- (Brazil) Fabricio Marabá (Satun United)
- (Thailand) Manso Ausman (Satun United)
- (Thailand) Thanakorn Sathanpong (Satun United)
- (Thailand) Thirawat Lertpitchapatch (Satun United)
- (Ivory Coast) Diarra Aboubacar Sidick (Uttaradit)
- (Thailand) Kritnapop Mekputcharakul (Uttaradit)
- (Thailand) Patipat Kamsat (Uttaradit)
- (Ghana) Otis Sarfo Adjei (Yasothon)

Own goal

- (Thailand) Tanakit Wonglikit (Bankhai United against Chanthaburi)
- (Thailand) Panadon Lexsuwan (Chanthaburi against Muang Loei United)
- (Thailand) Yongyut Jareonpoom (Chanthaburi against Muang Loei United)
- (Thailand) Chatchai Maneewan (Grakcu Saimai United against Pattani)

Source: thaileague.co.th
