= 2018 Thai League 4 =

Thai association football league

2018 Thai League T4
- Season: 2018

The 2018 Thai League T4 (also known as the Omsin League for sponsorship reasons) was the 18th season of the Thai League 4; it had redirected from the regional league division 2, since its establishment in 2006. The 60 clubs will be divided into six groups (regions). The 15 clubs advance to the Champion league round.

== Regional League stage All locations ==
Locations of the 2018 Thai League 4 All Teams
2018 Thai League 4 Bangkok & field Region
2018 Thai League 4 Eastern Region
2018 Thai League 4 Western Region
2018 Thai League 4 Northern Region
2018 Thai League 4 North Eastern Region
2018 Thai League 4 Southern Region

=== 2018 ===
Red Zone : 2018 Thai League 4 Bangkok Metropolitan Region
Yellow Zone : 2018 Thai League 4 Eastern Region
Pink Zone: 2018 Thai League 4 Western Region
Green Zone: 2018 Thai League 4 Northern Region
Orange Zone: 2018 Thai League 4 North Eastern Region
Blue Zone: 2018 Thai League 4 Southern Region

=== List of Qualified Teams ===
==== Upper zone ====
T4 North (1.5)

- Uttaradit
- Nan

T4 Northeast (2.25)

- Muang Loei United
- Khonkaen United
- Yasothon

T4 East (2.25)

- Bankhai United
- Chanthaburi
- Pluak Daeng Rayong United

==== Lower zone ====
T4 West (2.5)

- Nakhon Pathom United
- IPE Samut Sakhon United
- Hua Hin City

T4 Bangkok (1.75)

- North Bangkok University
- Grakcu Sai Mai United
- BGC

T4 South (1.75)

- Satun United
- Pattani
- Hat Yai
Football clubs in Bangkok Metropolitan Region

== Champions League All stage ==
=== Stadium and locations ===
Locations of the Champions League teams

==== Upper region ====
Team	Location	Stadium	Capacity
Group Stage round direct entrants (Upper Group)
Uttaradit	Uttaradit	Mon-mai Stadium	3,245
Muang Loei United	Loei	Wang Saphung District Stadium	????
Khonkaen United	Khonkaen	Khonkaen PAO. Stadium	7,000
Bankhai United	Rayong	Wai Krong Stadium	1,362
Chanthaburi	Chanthaburi	Chanthaburi PAO. Stadium	5,000
Play-off round participants
Nan	Nan	Nan PAO. Stadium	2,500
Preliminary round 1 round participants
Yasothon	Yasothon	Yasothon PAO. Stadium	2,500
Pluak Daeng Rayong United	Rayong	Rayong Province Central Stadium	7,500

==== Lower region ====
Team	Location	Stadium	Capacity
Group Stage round direct entrants (Lower Group)
Nakhon Pathom United	Nakhon Pathom	Nakhon Pathom Municipality Sport School Stadium	6,000
IPE Samut Sakhon United	Samut Sakhon	IPE Samut Sakhon Stadium	5,000
North Bangkok University	Pathum Thani	North Bangkok University Stadium (Rangsit)	3,000
Satun United	Satun	Satun PAO. Stadium	5,000
Play-off round participants
Grakcu Sai Mai United	Bangkok	Grakcu United Stadium	2,000
Pattani	Pattani	Rainbow Stadium	8,000
Hua Hin City	Prachuap Khiri Khan	Khao Takiap Stadium	3,000
Preliminary round 1 round participants
BGC	Pathum Thani	Leo Stadium	16,014
Hat Yai	Songkhla	Southern Major City Stadium, Phru Kang Kao	1,000

Football clubs in Bangkok Metropolitan Region

== Preliminary round 1 ==
3rd place from each zone of 2018 Thai League 4 have signed to qualifying in this round. Preliminary round 1 will be started after finish all matches of all zone by FA Thailand.

=== Upper region ===
The qualifying round will be played in regions featuring clubs from the 2018 Thai League 4 Northern Region, 2018 Thai League 4 North Eastern Region and 2018 Thai League 4 Eastern Region

2 September 2018	Yasothon	2 - 1	Pluak Daeng Rayong United	Ayutthaya
16:00 (UTC+7)	Diop Badara Aly 71'; Pattanapong Chumchan 81'	report	Jettarin Phetborisut 26'	Stadium: Ayutthaya Provincial Stadium; Attendance: 1,200; Referee: Teeramet Phuprang

=== Lower region ===
The qualifying round will be played in regions featuring clubs from the 2018 Thai League 4 Western Region, 2018 Thai League 4 Bangkok Metropolitan Region and 2018 Thai League 4 Southern Region

1 September 2018	BGC	2 – 1	Hat Yai	Prachuap Khiri Khan
16:00 (UTC+7)	Thammayut Rakboon 56'; Pongrawit Jantawong 74' (pen.)	report	Amorn Mudlied 77'	Stadium: Khao Takiap Stadium; Attendance: 170; Referee: Kittipong Chulert

== Play-off round ==
Runner-up and 3rd place from each zone of 2018 Thai League 4 and winners from Preliminary round 1 have signed to qualifying in this round. Play-off round will be started after finish all matches of Preliminary round 1 by FA Thailand.

=== Upper region ===
9 September 2018	Nan	0 - 1 (a.e.t.)	Yasothon	Angthong
16:00 (UTC+7)		report	Otis Sarfo Adjei 107'	Stadium: Angthong Provincial Stadium; Attendance: 315; Referee: Suchin Keawsopa

=== Lower region ===
2 September 2018	Grakcu Sai Mai United	2 - 1 (a.e.t.)	Pattani	Bangkok
16:00 (UTC+7)	Krittanon Thanachotjaroenphon 73', 120+2' (pen.); Chatchai Maneewan 90+3' (o.g.)	report		Stadium: Bangkokthonburi University Stadium; Attendance: 450; Referee: Chaiya Munmanee

8 September 2018	Hua Hin City	1 - 0	BGC	Prachuap Khiri Khan
16:00 (UTC+7)	Songkran Pungnoy 58'	report		Stadium: Sam Ao Stadium; Attendance: 100; Referee: Anuson Sangnaed

== Group Stage round ==
9 automatic Thai football teams and Winner teams from Play-off round pass to this round. this round provide 2 part to 2018 Thai League 4 champions league round Upper group and 2018 Thai League 4 champions league round Lower group. Each region has 6 Thai football teams. It plays Round-robin matches. Thai football teams which get champion and runner-up which has the best scores of each region to were promoted to 2019 Thai League 3. Mini-league rule is used to this tournament.

=== Upper group ===
Pos	Team	Pld	W	D	L	GF	GA	GD	Pts	Promotion or qualification
1	Khonkaen United (Q, P)	5	4	1	0	6	2	+4	13	promoted to 2019 Thai League 3 Upper Region and Qualification to Champion round
2	Muang Loei United (Q)	5	2	3	0	5	3	+2	9	Qualification to Third place play-off round
3	Bankhai United	5	2	1	2	7	6	+1	7	
4	Yasothon	5	1	2	2	5	7	−2	5	
5	Chanthaburi	5	1	1	3	6	7	−1	4	
6	Uttaradit	5	0	2	3	3	7	−4	2	

Updated to match(es) played on unknown. Source: Thai League 4
Rules for classification: 1) points; 2) goal difference; 3) number of goals scored.
(P) Promoted; (Q) Qualified for the phase indicated

15 September 2018	Bankhai United	0 - 0	Muang Loei United	Rayong
16:00 (UTC+7)		report		Stadium: Wai Krong Stadium; Attendance: 320; Referee: U-sen Yala

15 September 2018	Yasothon	0 - 2	Chanthaburi	Yasothon
16:00 (UTC+7)		report	Tripop Jaroensheep 85'; Chainarong Samuttha 87'	Stadium: Yasothon PAO. Stadium; Attendance: 2,360; Referee: Pisit Boonthongpaeng

15 September 2018	Uttaradit	1 - 2	Khonkaen United	Uttaradit
18:00 (UTC+7)	Kritnaphop Mekpatcharakul 45' (pen.)	report	Tebnimit Buransri 10'; Charin Boodhad 83'	Stadium: Mon-mai Stadium; Attendance: 915; Referee: Supat Chai-ngam

23 September 2018	Muang Loei United	0 - 0	Khonkaen United	Loei
16:00 (UTC+7)		report		Stadium: Wang Saphung District Stadium; Attendance: 1,254; Referee: Sittichai Saramai

23 September 2018	Bankhai United	3 - 2	Chanthaburi	Rayong
16:00 (UTC+7)	Chokchai Sukthed 58'; Piya Kruawan 61'; Thanakrit Wonglikit 76' (o.g.); Camara Souleymane 78'	report	Chainarong Samuttha 86'	Stadium: Wai Krong Stadium; Attendance: 200; Referee: Yutthana Sadkrathok

23 September 2018	Uttaradit	0 - 0	Yasothon	Uttaradit
18:00 (UTC+7)				Stadium: Mon-mai Stadium; Attendance: 660; Referee: Sakda Jitsupaworakul

29 September 2018	Muang Loei United	2 - 2	Yasothon	Loei
16:00 (UTC+7)	Abass Ouro-nimini 22'; Chawin Thirawatsri 44'	report	Pattanapong Chumjan 31'; Vichit Singloilom 64'	Stadium: Wang Saphung District Stadium; Attendance: 539; Referee: Teeramet Phuprang

29 September 2018	Chanthaburi	1 - 1	Uttaradit	Chanthaburi
18:00 (UTC+7)	Enoch Ozor 51'	report	Diarra Aboubacar Sidick 66'	Stadium: Chanthaburi PAO. Stadium; Attendance: 480; Referee: Teerachai Jampa

30 September 2018	Khonkaen United	1 - 0	Bankhai United	Khonkaen
18:00 (UTC+7)	Tebnimit Buransri 37'	report		Stadium: Khonkaen PAO. Stadium; Attendance: 5,473; Referee: Puttipong Isisingh

7 October 2018	Yasothon	1 - 2	Khonkaen United	Yasothon
16:00 (UTC+7)	Vichit Singloilom 22'	report	Charin Boodhad 60'; Jardel Capistrano 76'	Stadium: Yasothon PAO. Stadium; Attendance: 2,595; Referee: Sakda Jitsupaworakul

7 October 2018	Chanthaburi	1 - 2	Muang Loei United	Chanthaburi
18:00 (UTC+7)	Yongyut Jareonpoom 8' (o.g.); Panadol Leksuwan 55' (o.g.); Chainarong Samuttha 90+4' (pen.)	report		Stadium: Chanthaburi PAO. Stadium; Attendance: 825; Referee: Ekkachai Petcham

7 October 2018	Uttaradit	1 - 3	Bankhai United	Uttaradit
18:00 (UTC+7)	Patipat Kamsat 57'	report	Elvis Job 74'; Piya Kruawan 83'; Kaikitti In-uthen 90+4'	Stadium: Mon-mai Stadium; Attendance: 230; Referee: Seksan Phansri

13 October 2018	Bankhai United	1 - 2	Yasothon	Rayong
16:00 (UTC+7)	Kaikitti In-uthen 27'	report	Diop Badara Aly 57', 62'	Stadium: Wai Krong Stadium; Attendance: 300; Referee: Peerasan Krataithong

13 October 2018	Muang Loei United	1 - 0	Uttaradit	Loei
16:00 (UTC+7)	Andre Houma 27'	report		Stadium: Wang Saphung District Stadium; Attendance: 509; Referee: Noppadech Muang-ngam

13 October 2018	Khonkaen United	1 - 0	Chanthaburi	Khonkaen
18:00 (UTC+7)	Jardel Capistrano 57'	report		Stadium: Khonkaen PAO. Stadium; Attendance: 3,876; Referee: Jirawit Pornkaew

=== Lower group ===
Pos	Team	Pld	W	D	L	GF	GA	GD	Pts	Promotion or qualification
1	Nakhon Pathom United (C, Q, P)	5	4	0	1	9	2	+7	12	promoted to 2019 Thai League 3 Lower Region and Qualification to Champion round
2	North Bangkok University (Q, P)	5	3	1	1	15	4	+11	10	Qualification to Third place play-off round
3	Satun United	5	3	1	1	17	10	+7	10	
4	Hua Hin City	5	2	1	2	4	6	−2	7	
5	Grakcu Sai Mai United	5	0	2	3	2	10	−8	2	
6	IPE Samut Sakhon United	5	0	1	4	3	15	−12	1	

Updated to match(es) played on unknown. Source: Thai League 4
Rules for classification: 1) points; 2) goal difference; 3) number of goals scored.
(C) Champions; (P) Promoted; (Q) Qualified for the phase indicated

16 September 2018	IPE Samut Sakhon United	1 - 2	North Bangkok University	Samut Sakhon
16:00 (UTC+7)	Kissi Koffi Ludovic Loic 18'	report	Luis Carlos dos Santos Martins 3', 8'	Stadium: IPE Samut Sakhon Stadium; Attendance: 200; Referee: Jarun Chan-aem

16 September 2018	Satun United	1 - 1	Grakcu Sai Mai United	Satun
16:00 (UTC+7)	Rattikun Plonghirun 21'	report	Martins Caio Henrique 38'	Stadium: Satun PAO. Stadium; Attendance: 4,200; Referee: Matorha Sayor

16 September 2018	Nakhon Pathom United	3 - 1	Hua Hin City	Nakhon Pathom
18:00 (UTC+7)	Chokchai Chuchai 4'; Olveira Silva Diego 49' (pen.), 78'	report	Panudech Suebpeng 19'	Stadium: Nakhon Pathom Municipality Sport School Stadium; Attendance: 1,258; Referee: Kittipong Chulert

22 September 2018	Satun United	8 - 2	IPE Samut Sakhon United	Satun
16:00 (UTC+7)	Martins Caio Henrique 9', 45+1', 50'; Chamsuddeen Sohteng 17', 54'; Thirawat Lertpitchapatch 79'; Nattawut Moonsuwan 89'	report	Pantakan Kasemkulwilai 65'; Pethay Sa-ngiamsak 85'	Stadium: Satun PAO. Stadium; Attendance: 3,000; Referee: Worakrit Panyu

22 September 2018	Hua Hin City	1 - 0	Grakcu Sai Mai United	Prachuap Khiri Khan
17:30 (UTC+7)	Chatchai Phithanmet 90+2'	report		Stadium: Khao Takiap Stadium; Attendance: 200; Referee: Panupong Netrut

22 September 2018	Nakhon Pathom United	1 - 0	North Bangkok University	Nakhon Pathom
18:00 (UTC+7)	Saeid Chahjouei 27'	report		Stadium: Nakhon Pathom Municipality Sport School Stadium; Attendance: 1,577; Referee: Anuson Sangnaed

30 September 2018	Grakcu Sai Mai United	0 - 1	Nakhon Pathom United	Bangkok
16:00 (UTC+7)		report	Wisarut Pannasi 16'	Stadium: Grakcu United Stadium; Attendance: 450; Referee: Sachnukorn Saenju

30 September 2018	North Bangkok University	6 - 1	Satun United	Pathum Thani
16:00 (UTC+7)	Poomipat Kantanet 53'; Joao Francisco 55', 75', 89'; Luis Carlos dos Santos Martins 60', 85'	report	Thanakorn Sathanpong 90+2'	Stadium: North Bangkok University Stadium (Rangsit); Attendance: 885; Referee: Sakda Jitsupaworakul

30 September 2018	Hua Hin City	1 - 0	IPE Samut Sakhon United	Prachuap Khiri Khan
17:30 (UTC+7)	Chatchai Phithanmet 35'	report		Stadium: Khao Takiap Stadium; Attendance: 185; Referee: Anuson Sangnaed

6 October 2018	IPE Samut Sakhon United	0 - 0	Grakcu Sai Mai United	Samut Sakhon
16:00 (UTC+7)		report		Stadium: IPE Samut Sakhon Stadium; Attendance: 100; Referee: Teerachai Jampa

6 October 2018	North Bangkok University	0 - 0	Hua Hin City	Pathum Thani
16:00 (UTC+7)				Stadium: North Bangkok University Stadium (Rangsit); Attendance: 400; Referee: Apidet Wongsa

6 October 2018	Satun United	1 - 0	Nakhon Pathom United	Satun
16:00 (UTC+7)	Nattawut Moonsuwan 47'	report		Stadium: Satun PAO. Stadium; Attendance: 5,000; Referee: Pongpat Kaewbaworn

14 October 2018	Grakcu Sai Mai United	1 - 7	North Bangkok University	Bangkok
16:00 (UTC+7)	Samart Phetnoo 45+1' (pen.)	report	Luis Carlos dos Santos Martins 21', 73'<be> Chanukun Karin 26', 83', 90+1'; Poomipat Kantanet 70', 76'	Stadium: Grakcu United Stadium; Attendance: 199; Referee: Seksan Phansri

14 October 2018	Hua Hin City	1 - 6	Satun United	Prachuap Khiri Khan
17:30 (UTC+7)	Arnon Kaimook 61' (pen.)	report	Chamsuddeen Sohteng 10', 19' (pen.), 44'; Manso Ausman 12'; Nattawut Moonsuwan 67', 83'	Stadium: Khao Takiap Stadium; Attendance: 300; Referee: Apidet Wongsa

14 October 2018	Nakhon Pathom United	4 - 0	IPE Samut Sakhon United	Nakhon Pathom
18:00 (UTC+7)	Olveira Silva Diego 15', 30' (pen.); Nakun Pinthong 42'<be> Lesley Ablorh 90+1'	report		Stadium: Nakhon Pathom Municipality Sport School Stadium; Attendance: 1,325; Referee: Ekkachai Petcham

== Final round ==
=== Third place play-off round ===
Runner-up of Upper group and Lower group in Group Stage round pass this round. Winner of Third place play-off round was promoted to 2019 Thai League 3.

Team 1	Agg.	Team 2	1st leg	2nd leg
Muang Loei United	1 - 2	North Bangkok University	1 - 1	0 - 1

20 October 2018	North Bangkok University	1 - 1	Muang Loei United	Pathum Thani
16:00 (UTC+7)	Joao Francisco 57'	report	Krit Phavaputanon 90+4'	Stadium: North Bangkok University Stadium (Rangsit); Attendance: 650; Referee: Athiwat Silalo

27 October 2018	Muang Loei United	0 - 1	North Bangkok University	Loei
15:00 (UTC+7)		report	Poomipat Kantanet 67'	Stadium: Wang Saphung District Stadium; Attendance: 740; Referee: Chairoek Ngamsom

=== Champion round ===
Champion of Upper group and Lower group in Group Stage round pass this round. Winner of Champion round get champion of 2018 Thai League 4

Team 1	Agg.	Team 2	1st leg	2nd leg
Khonkaen United	4 - 5	Nakhon Pathom United	2 - 2	2 - 3

21 October 2018	Khonkaen United	2 - 2	Nakhon Pathom United	Khonkaen
18:00 (UTC+7)	Charin Boodhad 61'; Jardel Capistrano 86' (pen.)	report	Nattaphon Worasut 79'; Pongsatorn Tongcha-um 90+4'	Stadium: Khonkaen PAO. Stadium; Attendance: 4,291; Referee: Teetichai Nuanjan

28 October 2018	Nakhon Pathom United	3 - 2	Khonkaen United	Nakhon Pathom
18:00 (UTC+7)	Nakun Pinthong 16'; Diego Silva 25'; Pongsatorn Tongcha-um 36'	report	Jardel Capistrano 28', 57' (pen.)	Stadium: Nakhon Pathom Municipality Sport School Stadium; Attendance: 2,566; Referee: Songkran Boonmeekiat

the best

2018 Thai League 4

Nakhon Pathom United

== See also ==
- 2018 Thai League 1
- 2018 Thai League 2
- 2018 Thai League 3
- 2018 Thailand Amateur League
- 2018 Thai FA Cup
- 2018 Thai League Cup
- 2018 Thailand Champions Cup
