= 2007 Thailand League Division 2 =

- Season: 2007
- Champions: Muangthong United
- Promoted: Muangthong United; PTT Rayong

The 2007 Thailand League Division 2 (Division 2 Football League 2007) had 12 teams. The top two teams were promoted to Thailand Division 1 League, and the bottom two teams were relegated.

== Member clubs ==
- Army Welfare Department
- Bangkok Christian College
- Chiang Mai (Relegation from 2006 Pro League 1 16th)
- Kasetsart University (Relegation from 2006 Thailand Division 1 League)
- Mueang Thong NongJork United
- Navy Fleet Support
- Prachinburi joined the newly expanded league setup.
- PTT
- Samut Prakan
- Satun (Relegation from 2006 Pro League 1 15th)
- Thai Christian Sports Club
- Rajadamnern Thonburi College

== Locations of Thailand Division 2 League 2007 ==
Locations of 2007 Thailand League Division 2

Team	Location	Stadium	Capacity
Army Welfare Department	Bangkok	Thai Army Sports Stadium	15,000
Bangkok Christian College	Huai Khwang, Bangkok	Jarun Burapharat Stadium (Expressway Rama 9)	?
Chiang Mai	Chiang Mai	Chiangmai Municipality Stadium	?
Kasetsart University	Nakhon Pathom	Kasetsart University Kamphaeng Saen Campus Stadium	4,000
Mueang Thong NongJork United	Nonthaburi	Thunderdome Sport Complex	15,000
Navy Fleet Support	Sattahip, Chonburi	Royal Thai Fleet Football Field	?
Prachinburi	Prachinburi	Prachinburi Province Stadium	3,500
PTT	Bangkok	Prachaniwet Sport Centre	?
Samut Prakan	Samut Prakan	Royal Thai Naval Academy Football Field	?
Satun	Satun	Ratchakit Prakan Stadium	?
Thai Christian Sports Club	Bangkok	Shooter Kaset-Nawamin	?
Rajadamnern Thonburi College	Thawi Watthana, Bangkok	Rajadamnern Commercial Sport Complex	?

Football clubs in Bangkok Metropolitan Region

== Final league table ==
Pos	Team	Pld	W	D	L	GF	GA	GD	Pts	Promotion or relegation
1	Mueang Thong NongJork United	22	15	5	2	39	19	+20	50	Promotion spot for the Yamaha League-1
2	PTT	22	14	4	4	41	16	+25	46	Promotion spot for the Yamaha League-1
3	Prachinburi	22	12	7	3	40	21	+19	43	
4	Bangkok Christian College	22	12	4	6	39	28	+11	40	
5	Samut Prakan	22	9	7	6	38	33	+5	34	
6	Army Welfare Department	22	8	8	6	44	32	+12	32	
7	Chiang Mai	22	9	5	8	30	38	−8	32	
8	Rajadamnern Thonburi College	22	7	7	8	26	31	−5	28	
9	Satun	22	7	5	10	36	33	+3	26	
10	Navy Fleet Support	22	4	7	11	29	40	−11	19	
11	Thai Christian Sports Club	22	1	4	17	21	58	−37	7	Relegation spot
12	Kasetsart University	22	1	3	18	14	48	−34	6	Relegation spot

Source: rsssf.com

== Champions ==
Thailand Division 2 League Championships
2007 winners
Mueang Thong NongJork United
1st title

== See also ==
- 2007 Thailand Premier League
- 2007 Thailand League Division 1
