= 2016 Regional League Division 2 Southern Region =

- Season: 2016
- Champions: Surat Thani
- Relegated: Nakhon Si Heritage
- Matches: 132
- Goals: 335 (2.54 per match)
- Top goalscorer: Elvis Job (15 Goals)
- Biggest home win: Pattani 6–2 Ranong (23 April 2016)
- Biggest away win: Hat Yai 0–4 Nara United (21 May 2016)
- Highest scoring: Pattani 6–2 Ranong (23 April 2016); Surat Thani 4–4 Phuket (20 August 2016)
- Longest winning run: 6 Matches; Surat Thani
- Longest unbeaten run: 16 Matches; Surat Thani
- Longest losing run: 4 Matches; Hat Yai; Phang Nga
- Highest attendance: 10,800; Nara United 1–0 Surat Thani (23 July 2016)
- Lowest attendance: 100; Nakhon Si Heritage 0–3 Nara United (4 June 2016)

2016 Regional League Division 2 Southern Region is the 8th season of the League competition since its establishment in 2009. It is in the third tier of the Thai football league system.

== Changes from last season ==
=== Team changes ===
==== Relegated clubs ====
Phuket were relegated from the 2015 Thai Division 1 League.

==== Renamed clubs ====
- Surat renamed Surat Thani.
- Satun United renamed Cadenza Satun United.

==== Relocated club ====
- Chumphon moved into the Western Region.

==== Returning clubs ====
Hat Yai is returning to the league after a 1-year Withdrawn.

== Teams ==
=== Stadium and locations ===
Locations of the 2016 Regional League South Teams

Team	Location	Stadium	Capacity	Ref.
Hat Yai	Hat Yai, Songkhla	Jiranakorn Stadium	25,000	
Nakhon Si Heritage	Nakhon Si Thammarat	Nakhon Si Thammarat Province Stadium	4,744	
Nara United	Narathiwat	Narathiwat Provincial Administrative Organization Stadium	?	
Pattani	Pattani	Rainbow Stadium	?	
Phang Nga	Phang Nga	Phang Nga Province Stadium	3,000	
Phattalung	Phattalung	Phattalung Provincial Stadium	8,000	
Phuket	Phuket	Surakul Stadium	15,000	
Ranong United	Ranong	Ranong Province Stadium	7,212	
Cadenza Satun United	Satun	Satun PAO. Stadium	4,671	
Surat Thani	Surat Thani	Surat Thani Province Stadium	10,175	
Trang	Trang	Trang City municipality Stadium	4,789	
Yala United	Yala	Jaru Stadium	2,500	

== League table ==
Pos	Team	Pld	W	D	L	GF	GA	GD	Pts	Promotion or relegation
1	Surat Thani (C, Q)	22	13	6	3	33	21	+12	45	Qualification to Champions League Round and Promotion to Thai League Championship
2	Nara United (Q)	22	12	5	5	35	17	+18	41	Qualification to Champions League Round and Promotion to Thai League Championship
3	Trang (P)	22	10	5	7	29	25	+4	35 (Note: TRA 0–0 RAN ; RAN 2–3 TRA)	Promotion to Thai League Championship
4	Ranong United (P)	22	9	8	5	21	19	+2	35	Promotion to Thai League Championship
5	Pattani	22	10	4	8	39	25	+14	34 (Note: PAT 3–0 YAL ; YAL 3–2 PAT)	
6	Yala United	22	10	4	8	34	31	+3	34	
7	Satun United	22	8	8	6	31	26	+5	32	
8	Phattalung	22	7	6	9	23	30	−7	27	
9	Phuket	22	5	11	6	30	32	−2	26	
10	Hat Yai	22	7	1	14	22	39	−17	22	
11	Phang Nga	22	5	6	11	23	35	−12	21	
12	Nakhon Si Heritage (R)	22	2	6	14	17	37	−20	12	Relegation to Thai Football Division 3

Source: Division 2
Rules for classification: 1) points; 2) head-to-head points; 3) head-to-head goal difference; 4) head-to-head goals scored; 5) goal difference; 6) number of goals scored.
(C) Champions; (P) Promoted; (Q) Qualified for the phase indicated; (R) Relegated

== Results ==
Home \ Away	HAT	NAK	NAU	PAT	PHN	PHT	PHU	RAN	SAT	SUT	TRA	YAL
Hat Yai		2–1	0–4	2–1	2–0	0–1	1–2	0–1	1–3	2–3	1–3	3–2
Nakhon Si Heritage	0–1		0–3	0–0	3–1	1–1	2–2	0–1	0–0	0–1	1–3	0–1
Nara United	3–2	4–0		1–2	4–0	1–1	0–0	2–0	1–0	0–0	0–0	2–1
Pattani	3–0	3–1	0–1		1–0	2–0	3–1	6–2	1–1	0–1	3–1	3–0
Phang Nga	0–1	4–2	3–4	2–2		2–2	2–2	1–0	3–1	1–3	0–0	0–0
Phattalung	0–0	2–1	1–0	2–1	3–2		2–1	0–2	1–2	1–1	1–0	3–3
Phuket	1–2	0–0	0–1	2–1	1–1	2–1		0–0	0–0	2–2	3–2	2–1
Ranong United	2–1	2–1	0–0	1–1	1–0	1–0	1–1		1–0	2–0	2–3	1–1
Satun United	3–1	3–1	5–2	2–1	1–0	2–0	0–0	0–0		2–3	1–1	2–2
Surat Thani	2–0	0–0	1–0	1–3	1–0	1–0	4–4	1–1	2–0		3–1	2–1
Trang	1–0	2–3	0–2	1–0	0–1	2–1	2–1	0–0	1–1	1–0		4–1
Yala United	3–0	1–0	1–0	3–2	1–0	3–0	4–3	1–0	4–2	0–1	0–1	

Updated to match(es) played on 3 September 2016. Source: Division 2
Legend: Blue = home team win; Yellow = draw; Red = away team win.

== Season statistics ==
=== Top scorers ===
As of 3 September 2016.

Rank	Player	Club	Goals
1	(Cameroon) Elvis Job	Pattani	15
2	(Thailand) Supot Jodjam	Surat Thani	13
3	(Ivory Coast) Ibrahim Dicko	Nara United	9
3	(Nigeria) Julius Chukwuma	Satun United	9
5	(Madagascar) Dimitri Carlos Zozimar	Nara United	7
5	(Cameroon) Yannick Tougessong	Phang Nga	7
7	(Bosnia and Herzegovina) Miloš Galin	Nara United	6
7	(Ivory Coast) Cherif Mamy	Phattalung	6
7	(Ivory Coast) Ouattara Zana Brahima	Yala United	6
7	(Thailand) Saibudin Da-oh	Pattani	6
7	(Thailand) Adison Nuhnas	Trang	6
7	(Thailand) Sukree Etae	Phuket	6
7	(Ivory Coast) Sanou Oumar	Ranong United	6

== See also ==
- 2016 Thai Premier League
- 2016 Thai Division 1 League
- 2016 Regional League Division 2
- 2016 Thai FA Cup
- 2016 Thai League Cup
- 2016 Kor Royal Cup
