= 2024–25 Thai League 3 Central Region =

Thai League 3 Central Region
- Season: 2024–25
- Dates: 14 September 2024 – 30 March 2025
- Champions: Lopburi City
- Relegated: AUU Inter Bangkok; Dome
- T3 National Championship: Lopburi City; North Bangkok University
- Matches: 110
- Goals: 284 (2.58 per match)
- Top goalscorer: (Sweden) Alexandar Mutic (11 goals; Prime Bangkok)
- Best goalkeeper: (Thailand) Sanan Amkoed (10 clean sheets; North Bangkok University)
- Biggest home win: 7 goals difference Prime Bangkok 8–1 Saraburi United (17 November 2024)
- Biggest away win: 3 goals difference Chamchuri United 0–3 Prime Bangkok (2 November 2024); AUU Inter Bangkok 1–4 North Bangkok University (17 November 2024)
- Highest scoring: 9 goals Prime Bangkok 8–1 Saraburi United (17 November 2024)
- Longest winning run: 4 matches Kasem Bundit University; Prime Bangkok
- Longest unbeaten run: 14 matches North Bangkok University
- Longest winless run: 15 matches Dome
- Longest losing run: 4 matches AUU Inter Bangkok; Dome
- Highest attendance: 601; Saraburi United 1–2 North Bangkok University (19 October 2024)
- Lowest attendance: 0
- Total attendance: 24,994
- Average attendance: 234

The 2024–25 Thai League 3 Central Region is part of the 2024–25 Thai League 3 Regional Stage, consisting of 11 clubs located in the central region of Thailand. This region, formerly known as the Bangkok Metropolitan Region, has undergone significant changes with clubs relocating into and out of the area to better align with their geographical locations. The season will commence on 14 September 2024, with clubs competing in a round-robin format featuring home-and-away matches. The Regional Stage will conclude on 30 March 2025, at which point the top two clubs will advance to the National Championship Stage, while the bottom-placed club will face relegation to the Thailand Semi-pro League for the following season. The adjustments reflect a more balanced regional structure, promoting competitive fairness across the league. This stage highlights the vibrancy of central Thailand, where clubs compete within a diverse and dynamic landscape, reflecting the region's strategic importance in the country.

== Seasonal Changes ==
=== Formation of the Central Region ===
The former Bangkok Metropolitan Region was reorganized into the Central Region to better align with the geographical distribution of clubs. This change simplifies the regional structure and enhances clarity.

=== Club redistribution ===
To accommodate the new regional structure, several clubs were reassigned:

- Angthong, Lopburi City, PTU Pathum Thani, and Saraburi United were transferred from the Western Region to the Central Region.
- Samut Prakan was transferred from the Bangkok Metropolitan Region (currently Central Region) to the Eastern Region.
- Nonthaburi United, Royal Thai Army, Samut Sakhon City, Thonburi United, and VRN Muangnont were transferred from the Bangkok Metropolitan Region (currently Central Region) to the Western Region.

=== Promotion from Thailand Semi-pro League ===
Dome was promoted from the Thailand Semi-pro League and will compete in the Central Region for the 2024–25 season.

=== Promotion to Thai League 2 ===
Bangkok, the 2023–24 national champion, earned promotion to Thai League 2, representing a significant loss of a strong competitor for the region.

=== Relegation based on performance ===
The iCON RSU was relegated after finishing at the bottom of the table in the previous season.

=== Club logo changes ===
- Kasem Bundit University updated its logo, giving the club a more modern and polished image.

== Teams ==
=== Number of teams by province ===
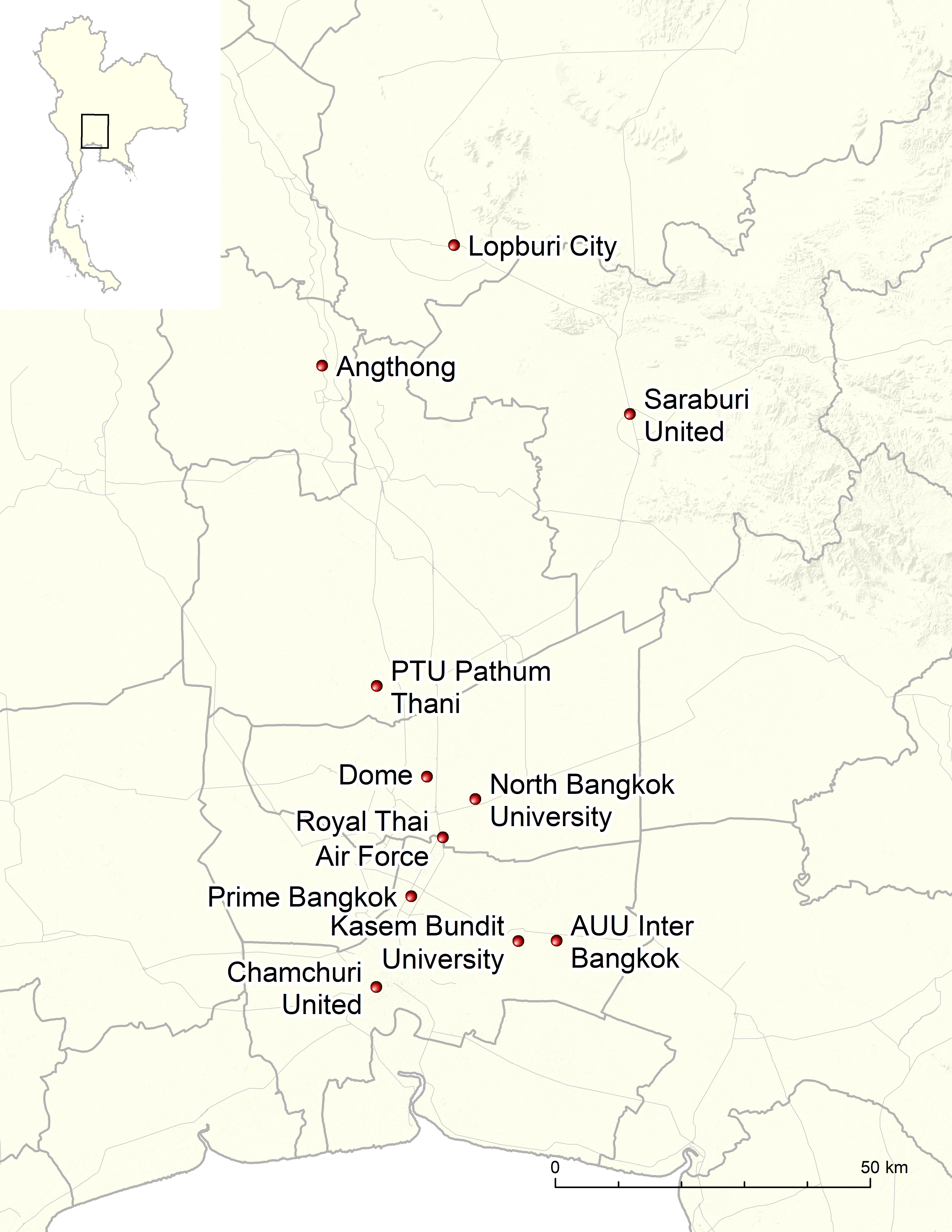
Locations of the 2024–25 Thai League 3 Central Region clubs.

Position	Province	Number	Teams
1	Bangkok	4	AUU Inter Bangkok, Chamchuri United, Kasem Bundit University and Prime Bangkok
2	Pathum Thani	3	Dome, North Bangkok University and Royal Thai Air Force
3	Ang Thong	1	Angthong
3	Lopburi	1	Lopburi City
3	Phra Nakhon Si Ayutthaya	1	PTU Pathum Thani
3	Saraburi	1	Saraburi United

=== Stadiums and locations ===
Team	Location	Stadium	Coordinates
Angthong	Angthong (Mueang)	Angthong Provincial Stadium	14°37′45″N 100°27′07″E
AUU Inter Bangkok	Bangkok (Min Buri)	72nd Anniversary Stadium, Min Buri	13°48′08″N 100°47′28″E
Chamchuri United	Bangkok (Pathum Wan)	Stadium of Chulalongkorn University	13°44′14″N 100°31′33″E
Dome	Pathum Thani (Khlong Luang)	Stadium of Bangkok University	14°02′19″N 100°36′08″E
Kasem Bundit University	Bangkok (Min Buri)	Stadium of Kasem Bundit University	13°48′06″N 100°44′06″E
Lopburi City	Lopburi (Mueang)	Phra Ramesuan Stadium	14°48′04″N 100°38′52″E
North Bangkok University	Pathum Thani (Thanyaburi)	Stadium of North Bangkok University	14°00′22″N 100°40′24″E
Prime Bangkok	Bangkok (Lak Si)	Boonyachinda Stadium	13°52′02″N 100°34′41″E
PTU Pathum Thani	Ayutthaya (Bang Sai)	Ratchakram Stadium	14°10′09″N 100°31′45″E
Royal Thai Air Force	Pathum Thani (Lam Luk Ka)	Dhupatemiya Stadium	13°57′04″N 100°37′30″E
Saraburi United	Saraburi (Mueang)	Saraburi Stadium	14°33′24″N 100°54′18″E

=== Personnel and sponsoring ===
Note: Flags indicate national team as has been defined under FIFA eligibility rules. Players may hold more than one non-FIFA nationality; Club dissolved during season would shown by grey background.

Team	Manager	Captain	Kit
Angthong	(Thailand) Prajak Waengsong		(Thailand) TW Sport
AUU Inter Bangkok			(Thailand) Next Design
Chamchuri United			(Thailand) FBT
Dome			(Thailand) Imane
Kasem Bundit University	(Thailand) Kit Singprecha		(Thailand) Grand Sport
Lopburi City	(Thailand) Nirut Surasiang		(Thailand) Imane
North Bangkok University	(Thailand) Damrongsak Boonmuang		(Thailand) H3
Prime Bangkok	(Thailand) Thanyaphon Khlaykam		(Thailand) Next Design
PTU Pathum Thani	(Thailand) Kantawat Suwanphayakoon		(Thailand) Ego Sport
Royal Thai Air Force			(Thailand) KELA
Saraburi United	(Thailand) Adirek Phanphairoj		(Thailand) Grand Sport

=== Foreign players ===
A T3 team could register 3 foreign players from foreign players all around the world. A team can use 3 foreign players on the field in each game.

Note :
(substituted off) : players who released during second leg transfer window;
(substituted on) : players who registered during second leg transfer window.

AFC member countries players.
CAF member countries players.
CONCACAF member countries players.
CONMEBOL member countries players.
OFC member countries players.
UEFA member countries players.
No foreign player registered.

Club	Leg	Player 1	Player 2	Player 3
Angthong	1st	(England) Karam Idris (substituted off)	(Brazil) Moacir (substituted off)	(Ivory Coast) Boubacar Koné
Angthong	2nd	(France) Mabiala Gaël Cedric (substituted on)	(Japan) Ryota Endo (substituted on)	(Ivory Coast) Boubacar Koné
AUU Inter Bangkok	1st	(Azerbaijan) Mammad Guliyev (substituted off)	(Ghana) Mohammed Rabiu Junior (substituted off)	(Brazil) Abraão de Sousa Lima
AUU Inter Bangkok	2nd	(Ivory Coast) Henri Jöel (substituted on)	(Nigeria) Michael Arinze Anunobi (substituted on)	(Brazil) Abraão de Sousa Lima
Chamchuri United	1st	(France) Elie, Jean-Jacques Lobouet (substituted off)	(Saint Kitts and Nevis) Tishan Tajahni Hanley (substituted off)
Chamchuri United	2nd		(Nigeria) Uche Vincent Egbuhuzor (substituted on)
Dome	1st
Dome	2nd	(Cameroon) Isaac Honore Aime Mbengan (substituted on)	(South Korea) Jeong Ja-in (substituted on)
Kasem Bundit University	1st	(Japan) Sosuke Kimura (substituted off)	(Nigeria) Ozobialu Chinedu Kennedy	(Nigeria) Chinonso Kingsley Thomas
Kasem Bundit University	2nd	(Nigeria) John Owoeri (substituted on)	(Nigeria) Ozobialu Chinedu Kennedy	(Nigeria) Chinonso Kingsley Thomas
Lopburi City	1st	(Brazil) Hudson Lucas dos Santos Barbosa (substituted off)	(Iran) Hamzeh Sari (substituted off)	(Cameroon) Alex Mermoz Djatche Nandje
Lopburi City	2nd	(Brazil) Matheus Felipe Oliveira de Moraes (substituted on)	(Brazil) Lucas Massaro Garcia Gama (substituted on)	(Cameroon) Alex Mermoz Djatche Nandje
North Bangkok University	1st	(South Korea) Kang Eui-chan (substituted off)	(South Korea) Seo Min-guk (substituted off)	(Ivory Coast) Mohamed Kouadio
North Bangkok University	2nd	(Brazil) Elias Emanuel de Magalhães Souza (substituted on)	(Australia) Scaroni Sebastian Andrew (substituted on)	(Ivory Coast) Mohamed Kouadio
Prime Bangkok	1st	(Sweden) Alexandar Mutic (substituted off)	(Sweden) Alexander Philip Dominic Tkacz	(Sweden) Lars William Kvist
Prime Bangkok	2nd	(Sweden) Jonathan Ermias Tesfay Habte (substituted on)	(Sweden) Alexander Philip Dominic Tkacz	(Sweden) Lars William Kvist
PTU Pathum Thani	1st	(Ivory Coast) Henri Jöel (substituted off)	(Ghana) Eric Kumi (substituted off)	(Japan) Ryo Tomigahara
PTU Pathum Thani	2nd	(Sierra Leone) Serry Issa (substituted on)	(Japan) Yuto Yoshijima (substituted on)	(Japan) Ryo Tomigahara
Royal Thai Air Force	1st	(South Korea) Seo Young-hoon (substituted off)	(Ghana) Emmanuel Kwame Akadom	(Ghana) Sah Benjamin
Royal Thai Air Force	2nd	(Ghana) Mensah Prince (substituted on)	(Ghana) Emmanuel Kwame Akadom	(Ghana) Sah Benjamin
Saraburi United	1st	(Argentina) Santiago Corral (substituted off)	(Chinese Taipei) Yao Nien-ping (substituted off)	(United States) Adoo Daniel Ikuukunee
Saraburi United	2nd	(Nigeria) Oguwike Emeka Ndubuisi (substituted on)	(Ghana) Ozor Enoch (substituted on)	(United States) Adoo Daniel Ikuukunee

== League table ==
=== Standings ===
Pos	Team	Pld	W	D	L	GF	GA	GD	Pts	Qualification or relegation
1	Lopburi City (C, Q)	20	12	5	3	41	21	+20	41 (Note: Lopburi City ahead on head-to-head points record; Lopburi City 4 pts, North Bangkok University 1 pt.)	Qualification to the National Championship stage
2	North Bangkok University (Q)	20	11	8	1	35	14	+21	41	Qualification to the National Championship stage
3	Kasem Bundit University	20	10	5	5	26	15	+11	35	
4	Prime Bangkok	20	8	6	6	34	28	+6	30	
5	Royal Thai Air Force	20	5	10	5	22	21	+1	25 (Note: Royal Thai Air Force ahead on head-to-head record; Royal Thai Air Force 3 pts (GD +1), PTU Pathum Thani 3 pts (GD -1).)	
6	PTU Pathum Thani	20	7	4	9	17	29	−12	25	
7	Chamchuri United	20	6	5	9	26	30	−4	23	
8	AUU Inter Bangkok (R)	20	4	7	9	28	29	−1	19 (Note: AUU Inter Bangkok ahead on head-to-head points record; AUU Inter Bangkok 4 pts, Angthong 1 pt.)	Relegation to the Thailand Semi-pro League (Note: AUU Inter Bangkok and Dome were administratively relegated to the 2026 Thailand Semi-pro League for failing to meet club licensing standards.)
9	Angthong	20	3	10	7	16	26	−10	19	
10	Dome (R)	20	3	9	8	17	32	−15	18	Relegation to the Thailand Semi-pro League
11	Saraburi United (Note: Saraburi United remained in the league after AUU Inter Bangkok and Dome failed to meet the club licensing criteria for the 2025–26 season, resulting in Saraburi United retaining their spot.)	20	3	7	10	22	39	−17	16	

Source: Thai League
Rules for classification: 1) Points; 2) Head-to-head points; 3) Head-to-head goal difference; 4) Head-to-head goal scored; 5) Overall goal difference; 6) Overall goal scored; 7) Fair play points; 8) Play-off without extra time).
(C) Champions; (Q) Qualified for the phase indicated; (R) Relegated

=== Positions by round ===
Team ╲ Round	1	2	3	4	5	6	7	8	9	10	11	12	13	14	15	16	17	18	19	20	21	22
Lopburi City	2	1	1	1	2	1	2	2	2	2	2	1	1	1	1	3	2	2	1	1	2	1
North Bangkok University	1	2	5	6	4	3	3	4	3	3	3	3	4	3	3	2	3	1	2	2	1	2
Kasem Bundit University	11	10	10	7	5	5	4	3	4	4	4	4	2	2	2	1	1	3	3	3	3	3
Prime Bangkok	3	5	3	3	1	2	1	1	1	1	1	2	3	4	4	4	4	4	4	4	4	4
Royal Thai Air Force	9	7	7	9	8	8	6	6	7	7	6	6	7	8	8	8	6	6	6	6	5	5
PTU Pathum Thani	4	6	4	5	7	6	7	7	6	6	7	5	6	6	5	5	5	5	5	5	6	6
Chamchuri United	10	4	2	2	3	4	5	5	5	5	5	7	5	5	6	6	7	7	7	7	7	7
AUU Inter Bangkok	5	9	9	10	9	9	10	9	9	10	10	8	8	7	7	7	8	9	9	10	8	8
Angthong	8	8	8	8	10	10	9	10	10	9	9	10	9	9	9	9	9	8	8	8	9	9
Dome	7	11	11	11	11	11	11	11	11	11	11	11	11	11	11	11	11	10	11	9	10	10
Saraburi United	6	3	6	4	6	7	8	8	8	8	8	9	10	10	10	10	10	11	10	11	11	11

Source: Thai League
= Qualification to the National Championship stage; = Relegation to the Thailand Semi-pro League

=== Results by round ===
Team ╲ Round	1	2	3	4	5	6	7	8	9	10	11	12	13	14	15	16	17	18	19	20	21	22
Lopburi City	W	W	W	L	N	W	D	W	D	W	D	W	W	D	N	L	W	D	W	W	L	W
North Bangkok University	W	D	N	D	W	W	D	D	W	W	D	D	N	W	W	W	L	W	D	W	D	W
Kasem Bundit University	L	D	L	W	W	W	D	W	D	N	W	W	W	W	D	W	D	L	L	N	W	L
Prime Bangkok	W	N	W	W	W	L	W	W	D	W	D	N	L	L	D	W	L	L	L	D	D	D
Royal Thai Air Force	L	D	D	N	W	D	D	D	D	D	D	D	L	N	L	W	D	W	W	L	W	L
PTU Pathum Thani	W	L	W	L	L	D	L	D	W	L	N	W	D	L	W	D	W	L	W	L	N	L
Chamchuri United	L	W	W	W	L	D	N	L	D	D	L	L	W	D	L	L	N	W	L	D	L	W
AUU Inter Bangkok	D	L	L	L	W	L	D	D	N	L	D	W	D	W	D	L	L	L	N	L	W	D
Angthong	L	D	D	D	L	N	W	L	L	D	D	L	W	L	D	N	W	D	L	D	D	D
Dome	N	L	L	L	L	D	D	L	L	D	D	L	L	D	D	D	W	W	D	W	D	N
Saraburi United	D	W	L	W	L	L	L	N	D	L	D	L	L	D	D	L	L	N	W	D	L	D

Source: Thai League
N = No match; W = Won; D = Drawn; L = Lost

=== Results ===
Home \ Away	ATG	AIB	CCU	DME	KBU	LBC	NBU	PBK	PTU	AIR	SBU
Angthong	—	0–0	1–1	2–2	0–0	1–1	1–1	0–0	2–3	1–0	2–1
AUU Inter Bangkok	3–0	—	4–1	1–3	1–3	2–0	1–4	6–1	0–1	0–0	2–2
Chamchuri United	1–1	3–1	—	2–1	0–1	4–1	0–1	0–3	3–0	2–2	0–1
Dome	0–0	2–2	0–2	—	1–0	1–3	1–1	0–2	1–1	1–1	1–1
Kasem Bundit University	3–0	1–0	4–2	2–0	—	1–2	0–2	1–2	2–0	1–1	2–1
Lopburi City	2–0	1–1	1–1	6–0	0–0	—	3–2	2–1	4–1	1–0	5–0
North Bangkok University	2–0	2–1	3–0	2–0	1–0	2–2	—	1–1	4–0	1–1	4–2
Prime Bangkok	3–2	2–1	1–2	1–1	0–1	2–1	0–0	—	3–2	1–2	8–1
PTU Pathum Thani	2–1	0–0	1–0	1–1	0–2	0–2	0–0	2–0	—	1–0	2–1
Royal Thai Air Force	0–0	2–1	2–1	0–1	1–1	2–3	0–0	2–2	2–0	—	3–2
Saraburi United	1–2	1–1	1–1	2–0	1–1	0–1	1–2	1–1	1–0	1–1	—

Source: Thai League
Legend: Blue = home team win; Yellow = draw; Red = away team win.
For upcoming matches, an "a" indicates there is an article about the rivalry between the two participants.

== Season statistics ==
=== Top scorers ===
As of 30 March 2025.

Rank	Player	Club	Goals
1	(Sweden) Alexandar Mutic	Prime Bangkok (11 Goals)	11
2	(Cameroon) Alex Mermoz	Lopburi City	10
2	(Brazil) Elias	North Bangkok University (10 Goals)	10
4	(Ivory Coast) Mohamed Kouadio	North Bangkok University	9
4	(Thailand) Weerapong Onpian	North Bangkok University	9

=== Hat-tricks ===
Player	For	Against	Result	Date
(Thailand) Kitti Kinnonkok	Lopburi City	Dome	6–0 (H)	21 September 2024
(Sweden) Alexandar Mutic^{5}	Prime Bangkok	Saraburi United	8–1 (H)	17 November 2024

=== Clean sheets ===
As of 30 March 2025.

Rank	Player	Club	Clean sheets
1	(Thailand) Sanan Amkoed	North Bangkok University	10
2	(Thailand) Siraset Aekprathumchai	Lopburi City	7
3	(Thailand) Nattapon Suansan	AUU Inter Bangkok	5
3	(Thailand) Chanon Aunjaidee	Kasem Bundit University	5
3	(Thailand) Kititad Khamkaew	PTU Pathum Thani	5

== Attendances ==
=== Overall statistical table ===
Pos	Team	Total	High	Low	Average	Change
1	Angthong	3,222	458	0	358	−43.7%
2	Lopburi City	3,325	503	169	333	+27.6%
3	Royal Thai Air Force	3,311	429	215	331	+58.4%
4	Prime Bangkok	2,994	430	230	299	−15.5%
5	Kasem Bundit University	2,550	500	150	255	+20.3%
6	Saraburi United	2,188	601	82	219	−62.8%
7	Chamchuri United	1,890	300	125	189	−10.0%
8	PTU Pathum Thani	1,487	325	0	165	+16.2%
9	Dome	1,577	250	100	158	+66.3%^{↑}
10	North Bangkok University	1,468	204	105	147	−9.8%
11	AUU Inter Bangkok	982	195	0	109	−14.8%
	League total	24,994	601	0	234	+2.2%

Updated to games played on 30 March 2025
Source: Thai League

=== Attendances by home match played ===
Team \ Match played	1	2	3	4	5	6	7	8	9	10	Total
Angthong	405	324	334	314	329	387	Unk.3	458	365	306	3,222
AUU Inter Bangkok	150	53	102	Unk.2	55	120	65	115	127	195	982
Chamchuri United	170	300	200	150	170	300	150	165	125	160	1,890
Dome	180	145	170	200	167	100	115	150	100	250	1,577
Kasem Bundit University	300	200	150	200	200	250	200	250	300	500	2,550
Lopburi City	400	420	169	503	413	415	310	170	225	300	3,325
North Bangkok University	204	154	197	105	128	120	120	120	120	200	1,468
Prime Bangkok	240	330	300	430	235	315	365	230	245	304	2,994
PTU Pathum Thani	Unk.1	120	107	220	325	150	70	300	125	70	1,487
Royal Thai Air Force	269	351	298	343	384	215	429	270	328	424	3,311
Saraburi United	196	205	601	90	125	127	112	82	150	500	2,188

Note:
Unk.1 Some error of T3 official match report 14 September 2024 (PTU Pathum Thani 1–0 Chamchuri United).
Unk.2 Some error of T3 official match report 2 November 2024 (AUU Inter Bangkok 0–0 Royal Thai Air Force).
Unk.3 Some error of T3 official match report 9 February 2025 (Angthong 0–0 AUU Inter Bangkok).
