= Akkarapol Meesawat =

Thai footballer

Personal information
- Full name: Akkarapol Meesawat
- Date of birth: August 8, 1991 (age 35)
- Place of birth: Phatthalung, Thailand
- Height: 1.72 m (5 ft 7 1/2 in)
- Position: Forward

Team information
- Current team: VRN Muangnont
- Number: 9

Youth career
- 2007–2009: Bangkok Christian College

Senior career*
Years	Team	Apps	(Gls)
2010–2014	BEC Tero Sasana	13	(4)
2013	→ RBAC BEC Tero (loan)	18	(9)
2014	→ Roi Et United (loan)	7	(0)
2015	Songkhla United	19	(2)
2016	Phuket	16	(2)
2017–2018	Hatyai	29	(11)
2019	Pattani	17	(2)
2020–2021	Songkhla	7	(3)
2021–2022	Chainat Hornbill	18	(2)
2023	Young Singh Hatyai United	4	(0)
2023–	VRN Muangnont	22	(3)
- * Club domestic league appearances and goals as of 25 February 2024

Akkarapol Meesawat (Thai: อัครพล มีสวัสดิ์, born August 8, 1991) is a Thai professional footballer.
