= 2018 Thai League 4 Bangkok Metropolitan Region =

Thai League 4 Bangkok Metropolitan Region
- Season: 2018
- Champions: North Bangkok University
- Relegated: Dome
- Matches played: 131
- Goals scored: 311 (2.37 per match)
- Top goalscorer: (Brazil) Joao Francisco (14 goals)
- Biggest home win: Bangkok United U-23 5–0 Samut Prakan (24 June 2018)
- Biggest away win: Air Force Robinson 0–4 PTU Pathum Thani (6 May 2018)
- Highest scoring: 7 goals Grakcu Sai Mai United 4–3 Police Tero U-23 (30 June 2018)
- Longest winning run: 8 matches North Bangkok University
- Longest unbeaten run: 13 matches North Bangkok University
- Longest losing run: 7 matches Samut Prakan
- Highest attendance: 600; North Bangkok University 2–0 PTU Pathum Thani (10 February 2018)
- Lowest attendance: 50; Kopoon Warrior 3–0 Rangsit University (24 March 2018); Grakcu Sai Mai United 1–2 Dome (1 April 2018); Police Tero U-23 0–3 North Bangkok University (7 July 2018)
- Total attendance: 24,420
- Average attendance: 188

2018 Thai League 4 Bangkok Metropolitan Region is the 10th season of the League competition since its establishment in 2009. It is in the 4th tier of the Thai football league system.

== Changes from last season ==
=== Promoted clubs ===
Promoted from the 2017 Thailand Amateur League Bangkok Metropolitan Region

- Air Force Robinson

=== Relegated clubs ===
Relegated to the 2018 Thailand Amateur League Bangkok Metropolitan Region

- Samut Prakan United

=== Renamed clubs ===
- Bangkok Glass B authorize from BGC
- Bangkok United B was renamed to Bangkok United U-23
- Grakcu Look Tabfah Pathum Thani was renamed to Grakcu Sai Mai United

=== Suspended clubs ===
- Bangkok Glass B is suspended 1 year from 2017 Thai League 4 Bangkok Metropolitan Region get lower 7th.

=== Expansion clubs ===
- BCC Club-licensing football club didn't pass to play 2018 Thai League 4 Bangkok Metropolitan Region. This team is banned 2 years and Relegated to 2020 Thailand Amateur League Bangkok Metropolitan Region.

=== Reserving clubs ===
- Police Tero U-23 is Police Tero Reserving this team which join Northern Region first time.
- Port U-23 is Port Reserving this team which join Northern Region first time.

== Stadium and locations ==
Locations of the 2018 Thai League 4 Bangkok Metropolitan Region teams

Team	Province	Stadium	Ref.
Air Force Robinson	Pathum Thani	Thupatemi Stadium	
Bangkok United U-23	Pathum Thani	Thammasat Stadium	
BGC	Pathum Thani	Leo Stadium	
Dome	Pathum Thani	Thammasat Stadium	
Grakcu Sai Mai United	Sai Mai, Bangkok	Grakcu United Stadium	
Kopoon Warrior	Phra Nakhon Si Ayutthaya	Ayutthaya Province Stadium	
North Bangkok University	Pathum Thani	North Bangkok University Stadium (Rangsit)	
Police Tero U-23	Bang Khen, Bangkok	Boonyachinda Stadium	
Port U-23	Khlong Toei, Bangkok	PAT Stadium	
PTU Pathumthani	Phra Nakhon Si Ayutthaya	Ratchakram Stadium	
Rangsit University	Pathum Thani	Rangsit University Stadium	
Samut Prakan	Samut Prakan	Samut Prakarn SAT Stadium (Keha Bang Phli)	

Football clubs in Bangkok Metropolitan Region

== League table ==
Pos	Team	Pld	W	D	L	GF	GA	GD	Pts	Qualification or relegation
1	North Bangkok University (C, Q)	22	17	3	2	41	14	+27	54	Qualification to Group Stage round of Thai League 4 Champions League
2	Bangkok United U-23	22	11	6	5	38	22	+16	39	
3	Grakcu Sai Mai United (Q)	22	10	8	4	35	27	+8	38	Qualification to Play-off round of Thai League 4 Champions League
4	BGC (Q)	22	9	10	3	33	24	+9	37	Qualification to Preliminary round 1 of Thai League 4 Champions League
5	PTU Pathum Thani	22	8	11	3	27	19	+8	35	
6	Samut Prakan	22	7	4	11	24	38	−14	25	
7	Kopoon Warrior	22	5	9	8	27	28	−1	24 (Note: Kopoon Warrior head-to-head record equaluate to Police Tero U-23. Kopoon Warrior ahead on Goal Different; Kopoon Warrior -1, Police Tero U-23 -6)	
8	Police Tero U-23	22	6	6	10	24	30	−6	24	Could not compete in 2019 Thai League 4 when this zone have member too much. PLT judge this quota
9	Air Force Robinson	22	6	5	11	16	27	−11	23	
10	Rangsit University	22	5	6	11	18	28	−10	21	
11	Dome (R)	22	5	4	13	19	32	−13	19 (Note: Dome head-to-head record and Goal Different equaluate to Port U-23. Dome ahead on Overall goals scored; Dome 19 goals, Port U-23 14 goals)	Relegation to the 2019 Thailand Amateur League
12	Port U-23	22	5	4	13	14	27	−13	19	Could not compete in 2019 Thai League 4

Updated to match(es) played on 25 August 2018. Source: Thai League 4
Rules for classification: 1) Points; 2) Head-to-head points; 3) Overall goals difference; 4) Overall goals scored; 5) Fair play points; 6) Play-off without extra time;).
(C) Champions; (Q) Qualified for the phase indicated; (R) Relegated

=== Results by match played ===
Team ╲ Round	1	2	3	4	5	6	7	8	9	10	11	12	13	14	15	16	17	18	19	20	21	22
North Bangkok University	W	W	W	W	W	W	W	W	D	W	W	W	W	L	W	W	W	D	L	W	W	D
Bangkok United U-23	W	W	W	W	W	D	L	D	W	L	L	L	W	D	W	D	W	D	D	W	L	W
BGC	W	D	W	W	D	D	L	W	D	D	W	W	D	D	W	D	D	D	W	L	L	W
Grakcu Sai Mai United	D	L	W	D	D	D	L	L	W	D	W	W	W	W	D	D	W	D	W	W	D	L
PTU Pathumthani	L	W	W	D	W	D	W	L	D	W	W	D	W	D	D	D	L	D	D	D	W	D
Samut Prakan	D	L	L	L	L	L	L	L	W	L	D	L	L	D	D	W	W	W	W	W	L	W
Kopoon Warrior	L	D	L	W	D	W	W	D	D	W	L	L	L	D	D	L	L	D	D	D	W	L
Police Tero U-23	L	L	L	D	L	W	D	D	D	W	W	D	W	L	L	L	W	D	L	L	W	L
Air Force Robinson	L	D	L	L	L	L	W	D	L	L	L	W	L	W	W	W	D	D	L	D	L	W
Rangsit University	W	L	L	D	L	L	D	D	L	L	D	W	D	D	L	W	L	W	L	L	W	L
Port U-23	W	W	L	L	D	W	L	W	D	L	L	L	L	D	L	L	L	L	W	D	D	L
Dome	L	D	W	L	W	L	W	D	L	W	L	L	L	D	L	L	L	L	D	L	L	W

Source: Thai League 4
W = Win; D = Draw; L = Loss

== Results ==
Home \ Away	AFR	BKUU-23	BGC	DOM	GSMU	KOW	NBK	POTU-23	PORU-23	PTUP	RSU	SAP
Air Force Robinson		0–0	2–1	1–0	1–2	2–2	1–0	0–1	0–1	0–4	3–2	0–1
Bangkok United U-23	0–0		2–2	2–0	4–0	2–1	0–1	3–2	2–1	2–0	2–0	5–0
BGC F.C.	0–0	2–2		1–1	1–2	4–0	2–2	2–0	2–0	0–0	1–1	3–2
Dome	1–0	0–0	1–3		1–2	2–2	1–4	1–0	1–3	1–2	0–0	3–1
Grakcu Sai Mai United	3–0	3–1	1–1	1–2		1–1	1–1	4–3	1–1	1–1	1–0	2–2
Kopoon Warrior	0–1	2–3	4–0	1–0	1–1		2–4	2–2	3–0	1–1	3–0	1–0
North Bangkok University	2–1	1–0	0–1	2–0	1–0	1–0		1–0	1–0	2–0	4–1	2–0
Police Tero U-23	1–0	3–2	1–2	3–2	0–0	0–0	0–3		0–1	1–1	1–0	3–0
Port U-23	1–2	0–0	1–1	0–1	0–3	0–0	0–1	1–1		0–1	2–1	0–1
PTU Pathumthani	0–0	3–1	1–2	1–0	1–1	1–1	3–3	2–1	1–0		0–0	1–1
Rangsit University	2–1	1–2	0–1	1–0	1–2	2–0	0–2	0–0	3–1	1–1		2–1
Samut Prakan	3–1	0–3	1–1	2–1	4–2	1–0	1–3	3–1	0–2	0–2	0–0	

Updated to match(es) played on 25 August 2018. Source: Thai League 4
Legend: Blue = home team win; Yellow = draw; Red = away team win.

== Season statistics ==
=== Top scorers ===
As of 25 August 2018.

Rank	Player	Club	Goals
1	(Brazil) Joao Francisco	North Bangkok University	14
2	(Thailand) Krittanon Thanachotjaroenphon	Grakcu Sai Mai United	12
2	(Ghana) Dennis Borketey	Look Isan (5), Samut Prakan (7)	12
4	(Thailand) Verapat Nilburapha	Bangkok United U-23	10
5	(Thailand) Phattharaphon Jansuwan	BGC	9
6	(Thailand) Jirayu Niamthaisong	Bangkok United U-23	8
6	(Thailand) Supanai Baipa-om	Grakcu Sai Mai United (3), Look Isan (5)	8
6	(Thailand) Wittawat Wongnarat	Kopoon Warrior	8
9	(Guinea) Djibril Soumah	Grakcu Sai Mai United	6
9	(Thailand) Ronnachai Pongputta	Police Tero U-23	6
9	(Thailand) Nuttapol Promthongwan	PTU Pathumthani	6

=== Hat-tricks ===
Player	For	Against	Result	Date
(Brazil) Joao Francisco	North Bangkok University	Samut Prakan	3–1	17 February 2018
(Thailand) Phattharaphon Jansuwan	BGC	Kopoon Warrior	4–0	14 May 2018
(Thailand) Verapat Nilburapha	Bangkok United U-23	Samut Prakan	5–0	24 June 2018

== Attendance ==
Pos	Team	Total	High	Low	Average	Change
1	Rangsit University	3,010	400	200	274	+24.0%
2	BGC	2,918	369	132	265	−20.4%
3	North Bangkok University	2,590	600	120	235	−19.8%
4	Dome	2,418	353	109	220	+36.6%
5	Grakcu Sai Mai United	2,005	450	50	182	−9.5%
6	Samut Prakan	1,990	358	113	181	−23.9%
7	Police Tero U-23	1,684	324	50	170	n/a
8	Port U-23	1,837	250	97	167	n/a
9	Air Force Robinson	1,672	218	132	167	n/a
10	PTU Pathumthani	1,466	200	70	133	+5.6%
11	Bangkok United U-23	1,433	300	74	130	+18.2%
12	Kopoon Warrior	1,397	400	50	127	−63.8%
	League total	24,420	600	50	188	−6.5%

Updated to games played on 26 August 2018
Source: Thai League 4

=== Attendance by home match played ===
Team \ Match played	1	2	3	4	5	6	7	8	9	10	11	Total
Air Force Robinson	179	212	138	218	149	152	132	132	168	192	Unk.2	1,672
Bangkok United U-23	200	150	122	105	90	300	93	100	88	74	111	1,433
BGC	276	311	369	249	274	132	231	187	267	281	341	2,918
Dome	258	278	150	337	343	131	109	183	152	124	353	2,418
Grakcu Sai Mai United	450	200	120	50	150	215	100	50	250	220	200	2,005
Kopoon Warrior	120	400	80	50	120	100	60	112	150	120	85	1,397
North Bangkok University	600	200	300	200	150	200	150	250	120	220	200	2,590
Police Tero U-23	Unk.1	324	120	230	300	250	120	50	90	80	120	1,684
Port U-23	200	190	200	100	250	97	200	100	200	150	150	1,837
PTU Pathumthani	150	108	128	126	120	126	200	70	120	120	198	1,466
Rangsit University	300	300	250	235	200	265	400	220	265	320	255	3,010
Samut Prakan	358	165	167	113	128	126	300	146	129	220	138	1,990

Source: Thai League 4
Note:
Unk.1 Some error of T4 official match report 10 February 2018 (Police Tero U-23 1–2 BGC).
Unk.2 Some error of T4 official match report 25 August 2018 (Air Force Robinson 3–2 Rangsit University).

== See also ==
- 2018 Thai League
- 2018 Thai League 2
- 2018 Thai League 3
- 2018 Thai League 4
- 2018 Thailand Amateur League
- 2018 Thai FA Cup
- 2018 Thai League Cup
- 2018 Thailand Champions Cup
