= Dome F.C. =

Thai football club

Dome โดม เอฟซี
- Full name: Dome Football Club
- Nicknames: Son of Dome (ลูกแม่โดม)
- Founded: 2014; 12 years ago
- Ground: Thammasat Stadium; Pathum Thani, Thailand
- Capacity: 25,000
- Owner(s): Dome F.C. Football Club Co., Ltd.
- Chairman: Yanyong Akarachindanon
- Head Coach: Prateep Senala
- League: Thai League 3
- 2024–25: Thai League 3, 10th of 11 in the Central region

Dome Football Club (Thai: สโมสรฟุตบอลโดม), is a Thai professional football club based in Pathum Thani. The club was founded in 2014. They currently play in Thai League 3 and Bangkok Premier League Significant Mark Building of Thammasat University to create this football club name.

== History ==
=== Establishment of the club ===
The Club was founded in December 2014 as one of the football development projects of Thammasat University, which had been submitted to the Thai Football Association in 2013 to send a team to Regional League Division 2 but had not passed consideration. The club had improved the plan and filed an offer to the football association again in 2014 and was approved for participation in the competition, being Regional League Division 2 (Bangkok Metropolitan Region).

In 2015, Dome FC competed in Regional League Division 2 for the 2015 season. It is their 1st season in the professional league. The club has finished 14th place in the league of the Bangkok Metropolitan Region.

==== Division 2 - Relegation ====
In 2016 the club competed in Regional League Division 2 for the 2016 season. It is their 2nd season in the professional league. The club has finished 10th place in the league of the Bangkok Metropolitan Region.

In 2017, Football Association of Thailand rebranded the league to Thai League 4. the club competed in Thai League 4 for the 2017 season. It is their 3rd season in the professional league. The club has finished 5th place in the league of the Bangkok Metropolitan Region.

In 2018 the club competed in Thai League 4 for the 2018 season. It is their 4th season in the professional league. The club has finished 11th place in the league of the Bangkok Metropolitan Region causing them to be relegation.

==== Return to professional football leagues ====
In early 2024, the club competed in Thailand Semi-pro League Bangkok Metropolitan region finished in 1st place of the region, promoted to the Thai League 3.

== Stadium and locations ==
Coordinates	Location	Stadium	Year
14°04′04″N 100°35′55″E	Pathum Thani	Thammasat Stadium	2015–present

== Season by season record ==
Season	League									FA Cup	League Cup	T3 Cup	Top goalscorer	
Season	Division	P	W	D	L	F	A	Pts	Pos	FA Cup	League Cup	T3 Cup	Name	Goals
2015	Div2 Bangkok	26	4	3	19	19	47	15	14th	Opted out	R2			
2016	Div2 Bangkok	20	4	6	10	19	41	18	10th	Opted out	QR1			
2017	T4 Bangkok	30	11	10	9	32	38	43	5th	Opted out	Opted out		(Thailand) Rachanon Srinok	10
2018	T4 Bangkok	22	5	4	13	19	32	19	11th	QR	QR2			
2019	TA Bangkok	2	1	0	1	9	2	3	QR	Opted out	Ineligible			
2020	TA	Not held due to COVID-19 pandemic in Thailand.								R2	Ineligible			
2021	TA	Not held due to COVID-19 pandemic in Thailand.								Opted out	Ineligible			
2022	TA Bangkok	3	3	0	0	8	2	9	1st	QR	Ineligible			
2023	TA Bangkok	5	4	0	1	17	3	9	2nd	R2	Ineligible		(Thailand) Punnapat Chaimanua	5
2023–24	TS Bangkok	8	7	0	1	36	10	21	1st	R1	Ineligible		(Thailand) Thanachot Sonsri	13
2024–25	T3 Central	20	3	9	8	17	32	18	10th	R1	Opted out	Opted out	(Thailand) Phongrarit Aimkamol	5

Champions	Runners-up	Promoted	Relegated

- P = Played
- W = Games won
- D = Games drawn
- L = Games lost
- F = Goals for
- A = Goals against
- Pts = Points
- Pos = Final position
- QR1 = First Qualifying Round
- QR2 = Second Qualifying Round
- R1 = Round 1
- R2 = Round 2
- R3 = Round 3
- R4 = Round 4
- R5 = Round 5
- R6 = Round 6
- QF = Quarter-finals
- SF = Semi-finals
- RU = Runners-up
- W = Winners

== Players ==
=== Current squad ===
As of 25 September 2024

Note: Flags indicate national team as defined under FIFA eligibility rules; some limited exceptions apply. Players may hold more than one non-FIFA nationality.

No.	Pos.	Nation	Player
1	GK	THA	Atituch Chankar
2	DF	THA	Channarong Ruansataporn
3	DF	THA	Wirachach Umtum
4	FW	THA	Tanat Wongsuparak
5	DF	THA	Thora Charoensuk
6	DF	THA	Krittapot Kongla
7	DF	KOR	Jain Jeong
8	MF	THA	Prateep Senala
9	FW	THA	Ratchanon Thisawet
10	MF	THA	Apipoo Suntornpanavej
11	FW	THA	Thanchot Sonsri
12	DF	THA	Watcharaphong Khongchuai
13	DF	THA	Saranyawat Naprasert
14	MF	THA	Jaradpong Niyomrat
15	MF	THA	Phongrarit Aimkamol
16	MF	THA	Jakkarin Kaewprom
17	FW	THA	Saranpat Yingsakul

No.	Pos.	Nation	Player
18	FW	THA	Kittikhom Chadathan
19	DF	THA	Panuwit Kumansit
20	MF	THA	Apirawit Funta
21	DF	THA	Phanawat Limwanasthian
22	MF	THA	Pasumon Pakdee
23	DF	THA	Teeraporn Atawongsa
24	FW	THA	Natpasit Phunyasiriwan
25	GK	THA	Wisanu Chamnongkan
26	DF	THA	Peerapat Chunhacha
27	DF	CMR	Isaac Mbengan
29	FW	THA	Phoomthai Singchai
30	GK	THA	Chanathip Posri
31	GK	THA	Kasidej Rungkitwattananankukul
33	GK	THA	Ratchataphoom Sornchaiyat
34	DF	THA	Napat Baedkhuntod
35	GK	THA	Phakaphomn Saenwong
91	FW	THA	Pinyo Inpinit

== Club staff ==
Position	Name
Chairman	(Thailand) Yanyong Akarachindanon
Club Advisory Chairman	(Thailand) Somchai Poolsawat
Team Manager	
Head coach	(Thailand) Prateep Senala
Assistant Coach	
Goalkeeper Coach	
Physiotherapist	(Thailand) Thawatchai Sae-ngow
Team Staff	(Thailand) Suraphan Ramrit (Thailand) Woramet Bunyok (Thailand) Titiphan Phongsri

== Honours ==
=== Domestic competitions ===
==== League ====
- Thailand Semi-pro League
  - Runners-up (1) : 2024
