= Thammasat Stadium =

Multi-purpose stadium in Thailand

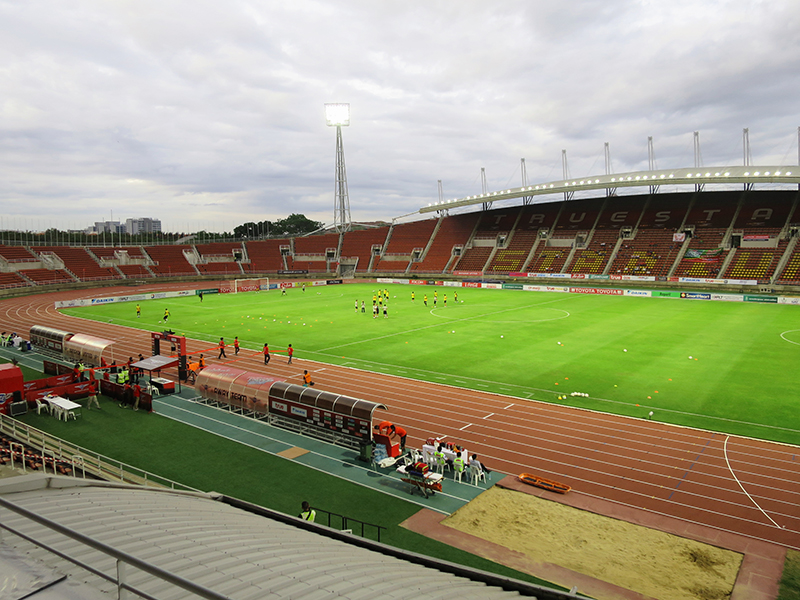
- Thammasat Stadium
- Interactive map of Thammasat Stadium
- Location: Thammasat University; Khlong Nueng, Khlong Luang, Pathum Thani, Thailand
- Coordinates: 14°04′04″N 100°35′55″E
- Owner: Thammasat University
- Operator: Thammasat University
- Capacity: 25,000
- Surface: Grass
- Field size: 95 x 62 metre.
- Public transit: SRT Thammasat University (from 2029)

Construction
- Opened: 1998
- Main contractor: Christiani & Nielsen

Tenants
- Thammasat University; Dome; Thailand national football team (selected matches)

Thammasat Stadium is a multi-purpose stadium in Khlong Luang, Pathum Thani, Thailand. It is currently used mostly for football matches. The stadium holds 25,000. It is on Thammasat University's Rangsit campus. It is located close to Bangkok.

== History ==
It was built for the 1998 Asian Games by construction firm Christiani & Nielsen.

Its appearance resembles a scaled-down version of Rajamangala Stadium. The tribunes form a continuous ring that is quite low behind each goal but rises up on each side. Unlike Rajamangala though, Thammasat has a roof covering both side tribunes. Most striking about this stadium are the floodlights. Thai architects usually favor concrete pylons but these are the steel variety. As viewed from the exterior of the stadium the base of each pylon seems to grip the outside of the stadium and they dramatically lean over the tribunes so as to better illuminate the playing area.

Thammasat was going to be used for PEA FC's match against Singapore Armed Forces FC in an Asian Champions League qualifier in February 2009. Still, the pitch was deemed unplayable and the match was switched to Rajamangala.

== Facilities ==
- The Main Stadium
- Thammasat Water Sport Center
- Gymnasium 1
- Gymnasium 2
- Gymnasium 3
- Gymnasium 4
- Gymnasium 5
- Gymnasium 6
- Gymnasium 7

== Historical tenants ==
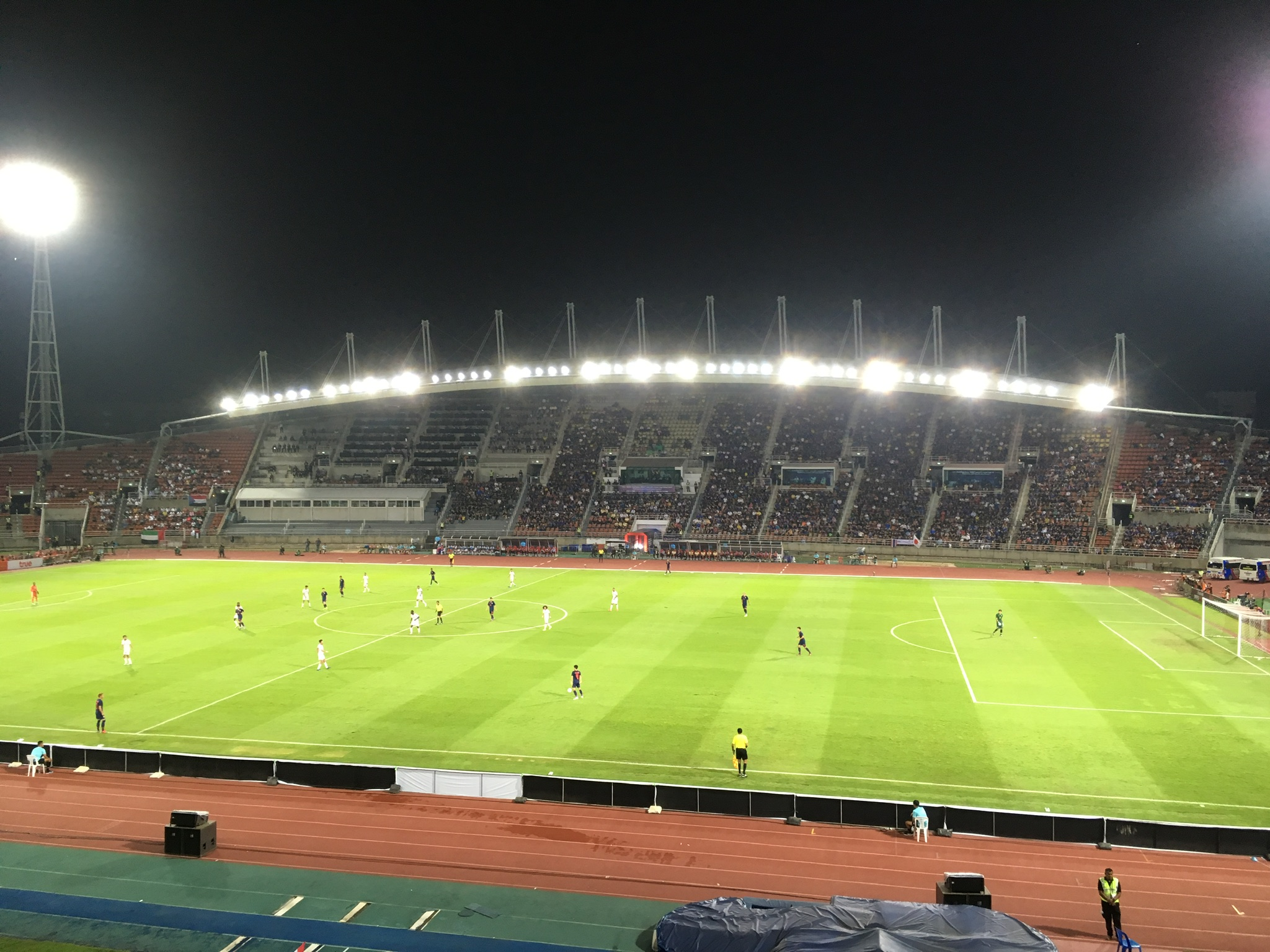
The Thammasat Stadium in 2019

Tenants of Thammasat stadium have been Thai professional football clubs as follows.

- PEA in 2001–2002
- Police United in 2011–2014
- Dome in 2015–present
- Bangkok United in 2016–2025

== International football matches ==
Date	Competition	Team #1	Res.	Team #2	Round	Attendance
5 September 2019	2022 FIFA World Cup qualification – AFC second round	Thailand	0–0	Vietnam	Group Stage	19,011
15 October 2019	2022 FIFA World Cup qualification – AFC second round	Thailand	2–1	United Arab Emirates	Group Stage	16,057
26 December 2022	2022 AFF Championship	Thailand	4–0	Philippines	Group Stage	6,567
2 January 2023	2022 AFF Championship	Thailand	3–1	Cambodia	Group Stage	8,415
10 January 2023	2022 AFF Championship	Thailand	3–0	Malaysia	Semi-final 2nd leg	18,927
16 January 2023	2022 AFF Championship	Thailand	1–0	Vietnam	Final 2nd leg	19,306
4 June 2025	Friendly	Thailand	2–0	India	Friendly match	2,181
13 November 2025	Friendly	Thailand	3–2	Singapore	Friendly match	10,205

=== Football at the 1998 Asian Games – Women's tournament ===
Date	Team #1	Res.	Team #2	Round	Attendance
7 December 1998	India	0–7	South Korea	Group Stage	N/A
7 December 1998	Chinese Taipei	0–5	China	Group Stage	N/A
9 December 1998	China	3–0	South Korea	Group Stage	N/A
9 December 1998	India	1–13	Chinese Taipei	Group Stage	N/A

=== 2020 AFC U-23 Championship ===
Date	Team #1	Res.	Team #2	Round	Attendance
8 January 2020	Iraq	1–1	Australia	Group Stage	106
9 January 2020	Qatar	2–2	Syria	Group Stage	750
9 January 2020	Japan	1–2	Saudi Arabia	Group Stage	1,433
11 January 2020	Bahrain	2–2	Iraq	Group Stage	112
12 January 2020	Saudi Arabia	0–0	Qatar	Group Stage	150
12 January 2020	Syria	2–1	Japan	Group Stage	1,509
14 January 2020	Australia	1–1	Bahrain	Group Stage	123
15 January 2020	Uzbekistan	1–2	South Korea	Group Stage	606
15 January 2020	Saudi Arabia	1–0	Syria	Group Stage	87
18 January 2020	Saudi Arabia	1–0	Thailand	Quarter-finals	14,958
19 January 2020	South Korea	2–1	Jordan	Quarter-finals	596
22 January 2020	Australia	0–2	South Korea	Semi-Finals	789

=== 2023 AFC U-17 Asian Cup ===
Date	Team #1	Res.	Team #2	Round	Attendance
15 June 2023	Yemen	4–0	Malaysia	Group Stage	129
17 June 2023	India	1–1	Vietnam	Group Stage	108
18 June 2023	Laos	1–2	Yemen	Group Stage	122
20 June 2023	Uzbekistan	1–0	India	Group Stage	98
21 June 2023	Malaysia	2–1	Laos	Group Stage	135
23 June 2023	Vietnam	0–1	Uzbekistan	Group Stage	149
25 June 2023	Iran	0–0 (4–2 pen.)	Yemen	Quarter-finals	
26 June 2023	Saudi Arabia	0–2	Uzbekistan	Quarter-finals	170
29 June 2023	Iran	0–3	Japan	Semi-finals	298
