= Jardel (footballer, born 1989) =

Brazilian footballer

Personal information
- Full name: Jardel Capistrano
- Date of birth: 10 October 1989 (age 37)
- Place of birth: Blumenau, Santa Catarina, Brazil
- Height: 1.93 m (6 ft 4 in)
- Position: Forward

Team information
- Current team: Nongbua Pitchaya
- Number: 99

Senior career*
Years	Team	Apps	(Gls)
2010	Riopardense		
2011	Olímpia		
2012	Rio Branco		
2012	Juventus Jaraguá		
2013	Marília		
2013	Monte Azul		
2014	Inter de Limeira		
2014	União São João		
2015	Matonense		
2015	Botafogo-SP	8	(0)
2016	Cabofriense		
2016	Uniclinic	8	(1)
2017	Than Quảng Ninh	4	(0)
2017	Nongbua Pitchaya	10	(6)
2018	Khon Kaen United	22	(15)
2019	Bragantino	0	(0)
2019	Muang Loei United	2	(1)
2020	Uthai Thani	4	(3)
2020–2021	Udon United	22	(24)
2021–2022	Rajpracha	27	(14)
2022–2023	Songkhla	21	(19)
2023	DP Kanchanaburi	16	(7)
2024	Nongbua Pitchaya	24	(14)
2025	Mahasarakham	10	(7)
2025-	Nongbua Pitchaya	26	(12)
- * Club domestic league appearances and goals as of 25 January 2025

Jardel Capistrano (born 10 October 1989), commonly known as Jardel, is a Brazilian footballer who is a member for Nongbua Pitchaya F.C. of the Thai League 2.

== Club career ==
Jardel joined Vietnamese side Than Quảng Ninh in January 2017. He was released along with fellow Brazilian Ramon in April of the same year.

== Career statistics ==
=== Club ===
As of 8 October 2018.

Club	Season	League			Cup		Continental		Other		Total	
Club	Season	Division	Apps	Goals	Apps	Goals	Apps	Goals	Apps	Goals	Apps	Goals
Rio Branco	2012	—			0	0	–		13 (Note: Appearances in the Campeonato Paulista Série A3)	5	13	5
Marília	2013	—			0	0	–		7	1	7	1
Monte Azul	2013	—			5 (Note: Appearances in the Copa Paulista)	1	–		0	0	5	1
Inter de Limeira	2014	—			0	0	–		9	6	9	6
Matonense	2015	—			0	0	–		15 (Note: Appearances in the Campeonato Paulista Série A2)	7	15	7
Botafogo-SP	2015	Série D	8	0	0	0	–		0	0	8	0
Cabofriense	2016	—			0	0	–		5 (Note: Appearances in the Campeonato Carioca)	0	5	0
Uniclinic	2016	Série D	8	1	0	0	–		0	0	8	1
Than Quảng Ninh	2017	V.League 1	4	0	0	0	1 (Note: Appearances in the AFC Cup)	0	0	0	5	0
Nongbua Pitchaya	2017	Thai League 2	10	6	1 (Note: Appearances in the Thai FA Cup)	0	–		0	0	11	6
Khon Kaen United	2018	Thai League 4	22	15	0	0	–		0	0	22	15
Bragantino	2019	Série B	0	0	0	0	–		7 (Note: Appearances in the Campeonato Paulista)	0	7	0
Career total			52	22	6	1	1	0	56	19	115	42

== Honours ==
=== Club ===
Songkhla

- Thai League 3 Southern Region: 2022–23
