= Wisarut Pannasri =

Thai footballer (born 1982)

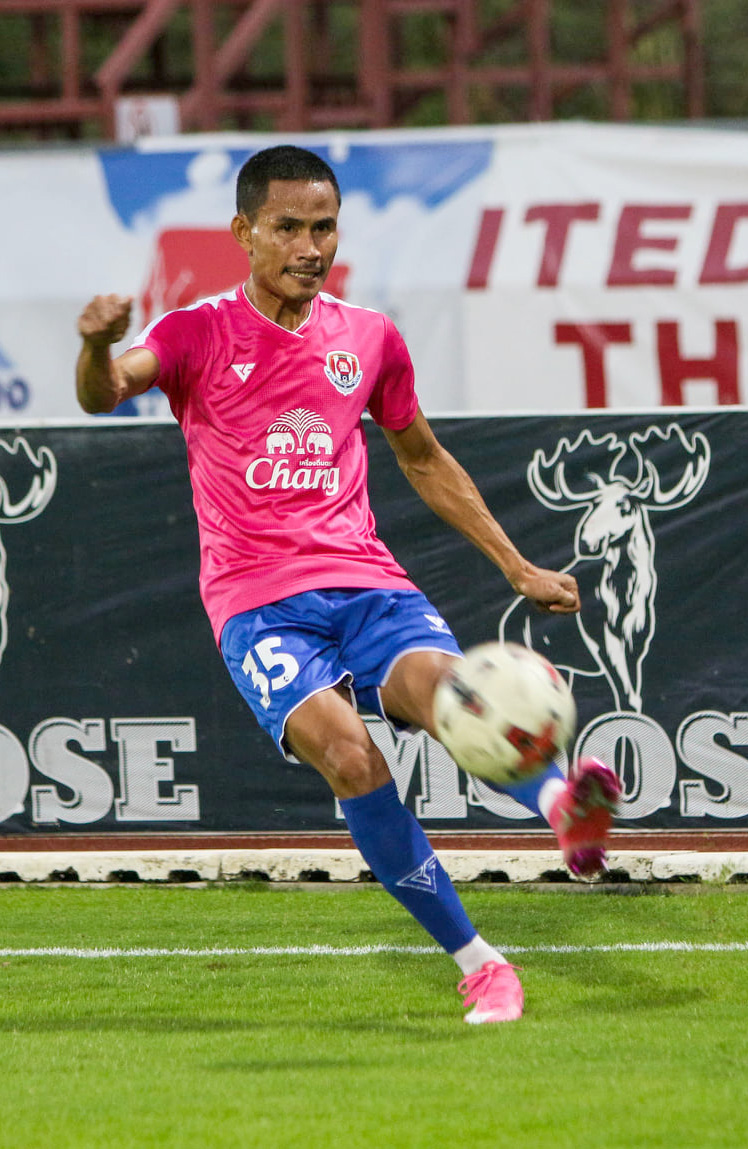
- Wisarut in 2022

Personal information
- Full name: Wisarut Pannasri
- Date of birth: June 13, 1982 (age 44)
- Place of birth: Kamphaeng Phet, Thailand
- Height: 1.74 m (5 ft 8 1/2 in)
- Position: Left back

Senior career*
Years	Team	Apps	(Gls)
2005–2008	Bangkok Bank	64	(2)
2009	Muangthong United	20	(3)
2010	→ Rajpracha (loan)	4	(0)
2011	→ Samut Songkhram (loan)	0	(0)
2012	BEC Tero Sasana	16	(2)
2012–2013	Bangkok United	14	(0)
2014	Police United	12	(1)
2015	Ang Thong	18	(0)
2016	Customs United	22	(1)
2017–2018	Nakhon Pathom United	29	(2)
2019	Army United	10	(0)
2020–2021	Navy	25	(0)
2021–2023	Lopburi City	38	(4)
Total		272	(15)
- * Club domestic league appearances and goals as of 22 June 2008

Wisarut Pannasri (Thai: วิศรุต พันนาสี; born June 13, 1982) is a Thai retired professional footballer who played as a left back.

== Honours ==
=== Club ===
Muangthong United

- Thai Premier League (1): 2009
