= Ratchakit Prakan Stadium =

- Interactive map of Ratchakit Prakan Stadium
- Location: Satun, Thailand
- Coordinates: 6°36′24″N 100°05′16″E
- Owner: Satun Municipality
- Operator: Satun Municipality
- Capacity: 1,500
- Surface: Grass

Construction
- Opened: 2006

Tenant
- Satun United F.C.

Ratchakit Prakan Stadium (Thai: สนามกีฬารัชกิจประการ) is a multi-purpose stadium in Satun Province, Thailand. It is currently used mostly for football matches and is the home stadium of Satun United F.C.
