= Moacir (footballer, born 1993) =

Brazilian footballer

Personal information
- Full name: Moacir Da Rosa Wilmsen
- Date of birth: 13 March 1993 (age 33)
- Place of birth: Joinville, Brazil
- Height: 1.75 m (5 ft 9 in)
- Position: Midfielder

Youth career
- –2010: Caxias

Senior career*
Years	Team	Apps	(Gls)
2011	Caxias-SC		
2012	Juventus Jaraguá		
2014–2016	Aimoré	29	(3)
2017	Panambi	5	(1)
2018	Aimoré		
2018–2019	Pembroke Athleta	21	(3)
2019–2020	Angthong	28	(21)
2021	Muang Loei United	8	(0)
2021–2022	Bangkok	13	(4)
2024	Angthong	7	(0)
- * Club domestic league appearances and goals as of 10 April 2024

Moacir Da Rosa Wilmsen (born 13 March 1993), commonly known as Moacir, is a Brazilian footballer.

== Career statistics ==
=== Club ===
As of 14 July 2020.

Club	Season	League			State league		Cup		Other		Total	
Club	Season	Division	Apps	Goals	Apps	Goals	Apps	Goals	Apps	Goals	Apps	Goals
Aimoré	2014	–			9 (Note: Appearances in the Campeonato Gaúcho)	0	0	0	0	0	9	0
Aimoré	2015	–			11	1	0	0	0	0	11	1
Aimoré	2016	–			9	2	0	0	0	0	9	2
Aimoré	Total		0	0	29	3	0	0	0	0	29	3
Panambi	2017	–			5 (Note: Appearances in the Campeonato Gaúcho Série A2)	1	0	0	0	0	5	1
Pembroke Athleta	2018–19	Maltese First Division	21	3	–		0	0	0	0	21	3
Career total			21	3	34	4	0	0	0	0	55	7
