= Hatyai F.C. =

Football club in Songkhla, Thailand

Hatyai F.C. หาดใหญ่ เอฟ.ซี.
- Full name: Hat Yai Football Club สโมสรฟุตบอลหาดใหญ่
- Nickname(s): Red Eagles (อินทรีแดง)
- Founded: 2010; 15 years ago
- Dissolved: 2017 (became Hatyai City)
- Ground: Chira Nakhon Stadium; Songkhla, Thailand
- Capacity: 25,000
- Owner: Hat Yai F.C. 2016 Co., Ltd.
- Chairman: Dej-Is Khaothong
- Manager: Anumat Ahmad
- Coach: Surapon Punchom
- League: Thai League 4
- 2016: 10th, Division 2 (Southern Region)
Home colours	Away colours	Third colours

Hat Yai Football Club (Thai สโมสรฟุตบอลหาดใหญ่ ) is a defunct Thai semi professional football club based in Hat Yai, Songkhla Province.

== Stadium and locations ==
Coordinates	Location	Stadium	Year
7°01′13″N 100°28′18″E	Hat Yai, Songkhla	Chira Nakhon Stadium	2010–2016
6°55′04″N 100°27′25″E	Hat Yai, Songkhla	Muang Lak Southern Stadium	2017

== Season By Season record ==
Season	League									FA Cup	League Cup	Top goalscorer	
Season	Division	P	W	D	L	F	A	Pts	Pos	FA Cup	League Cup	Name	Goals
2010	South	24	4	11	9	22	26	23	12th	R1	R1		
2011	South	24	12	5	7	38	28	41	4th	Not Enter	Not Enter		
2012	South	20	6	3	11	15	21	21	8th	Not Enter	Not Enter		
2013	Not Enter	–	–	–	–	–	–	–	–				
2014	South	24	2	1	21	15	50	7	13th	Not Enter	Not Enter		
2015	Not Enter	–	–	–	–	–	–	–	–				
2016	South	22	7	1	14	22	39	22	10th	Not Enter	Not Enter		
2017	T4 South	24	8	6	10	24	29	30	5th	Not Enter	Not Enter	(Thailand) Akkarapol Meesawat	8
2018	T4 South	21	7	9	5	28	24	30	3rd			(Thailand) Akkarapol Meesawat	9

Champions	Runners-up	Promoted	Relegated

- P = Played
- W = Games won
- D = Games drawn
- L = Games lost
- F = Goals for
- A = Goals against
- Pts = Points
- Pos = Final position
- TPL = Thai Premier League
- DIV1 = Division 1 League
- DIV2 = Division 2 League
- SOUTH = Regional League South Division
- QR1 = First Qualifying Round
- QR2 = Second Qualifying Round
- QR3 = Third Qualifying Round
- QR4 = Fourth Qualifying Round
- RInt = Intermediate Round
- R1 = Round 1
- R2 = Round 2
- R3 = Round 3
- R4 = Round 4
- R5 = Round 5
- R6 = Round 6
- GR = Group stage
- QF = Quarter-finals
- SF = Semi-finals
- RU = Runners-up
- S = Shared
- W = Winners

== Player ==
=== Current squad ===
Note: Flags indicate national team as defined under FIFA eligibility rules; some limited exceptions apply. Players may hold more than one non-FIFA nationality.

No.	Pos.	Nation	Player
4	DF	(Thailand) THA	Chaiwat Phairot
5	DF	(Malaysia) MAS	Abdulhafis Nibu
6	DF	(Thailand) THA	Sondech Lambenmud
8	MF	(Thailand) THA	As-ha Timung
9	FW	(Thailand) THA	Suriya Sala
11	MF	(Thailand) THA	Nuttakorn Khunjarern
12	MF	(Thailand) THA	Jedsada Srisamut
14	FW	(Thailand) THA	Wutthipong Kuedkul
15	MF	(Thailand) THA	Khanchai Sukhpala
16	DF	(Thailand) THA	Uthai Srirasan
17	MF	(Ghana) GHA	Boreng Kwabena
18	DF	(Thailand) THA	Wanasan Suwanno
19	FW	(Thailand) THA	Witthaya Mad-ahin
20	DF	(Cameroon) CMR	Nkoa Ndoudsa Olivier
21	DF	(Thailand) THA	Sanya Niso
22	FW	(Thailand) THA	Alongkorn Sakornvirojana

No.	Pos.	Nation	Player
23	GK	(Thailand) THA	Abdullah Bil-asun
24	DF	(Cameroon) CMR	Lemondou Wamba Serge
25	MF	(Thailand) THA	Waesakree Waedolah
26	MF	(Thailand) THA	Niyom Rakjit
27	MF	(Thailand) THA	Surin Ra-oab
28	DF	(Ghana) GHA	Ngueukam Yannick
29	DF	(Thailand) THA	Nutthapong Janpen
30	DF	(Thailand) THA	Pisit Kornsongkaew
31	MF	(Thailand) THA	Farid Madso
32	DF	(Thailand) THA	Singha Chantrakul
33	FW	(Thailand) THA	Atthaphon Wongsoonthorn
34	GK	(Thailand) THA	Patthara Thaweejitr
37	MF	(Thailand) THA	Khoiree Layeng
39	GK	(Thailand) THA	A-lif Sama-ae
59	MF	(Thailand) THA	Muhamat-asli Awaebasa
99	MF	(Thailand) THA	Asming Mae
