= Elvis Job =

Cameroonian footballer

Personal information
- Full name: Elvis Job Njouonkou Mountap
- Date of birth: November 2, 1992 (age 34)
- Place of birth: Cameroon
- Height: 1.85 m (6 ft 1 in)
- Position: Forward

Team information
- Current team: Banbueng
- Number: 9

Senior career*
Years	Team	Apps	(Gls)
2012	Songkhla		
2013	Songkhla United	7	(2)
2014–2015	Ubon Ratchathani	25	(26)
2015–2017	Pattani	34	(24)
2017	Satun United	7	(2)
2018	Bankhai United		
2019	Uttaradit F.C.		
2020–	Banbueng	6	(4)
- * Club domestic league appearances and goals

Elvis Job (born 2 November 1992) is a Cameroonian footballer. He plays for Thailand's Banbueng FC.
