= Yasothon Provincial Administrative Organization Stadium =

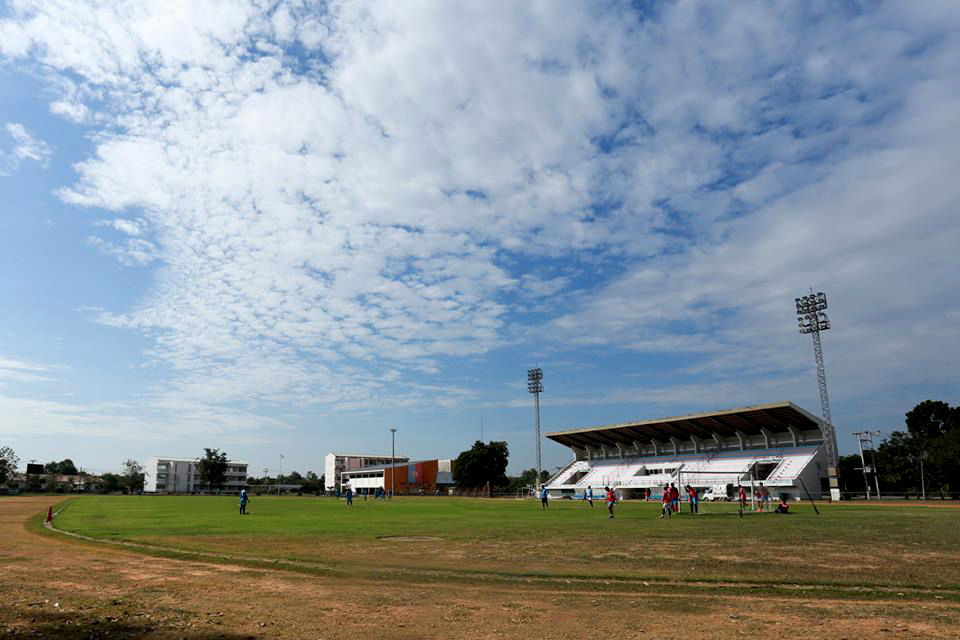
- Interactive map of Yasothon Provincial Administrative Organization Stadium
- Location: Yasothon, Thailand
- Coordinates: 15°46′58″N 104°09′05″E
- Capacity: 5,000
- Surface: Grass

Tenant
- Yasothon F.C. 2010-2011

Yasothon Provincial Administrative Organization Stadium (Suan Phayathan Stadium) (Thai: สนามกีฬาองค์การบริหารส่วนจังหวัดจังหวัดยโสธร (สวนพญาแถน)) is a multi-purpose stadium in Yasothon province, Thailand. It is currently used mostly for football matches and is the home stadium of Yasothon F.C.
