= PT Satun F.C. =

Thai football club

PT Satun พีที สตูล
- Full name: PT Satun Football Club สโมสรฟุตบอลพีที สตูล
- Nicknames: The Ultimate Exorcists (หมอผีสตูล)
- Short name: Satun
- Founded: 1998; 28 years ago
- Ground: Satun PAO. Stadium; Satun, Thailand
- Capacity: 5,000
- Owner(s): Satun F.C. Co., Ltd.
- Chairman: Pongphat Thing-nui
- Manager: Pheeraphat Ratchakitprakran
- Coach: Maka Hoprasartsuk
- League: Thai League 2
- 2025–26: Thai League 3, promoted after finishing 3rd in the Champions League
Home colours	Away colours

PT Satun Football Club (Thai: สโมสรฟุตบอลพีที สตูล) is a Thai professional football club based in Satun Province, a city located near to the border of Malaysia. The club is currently playing in the Thai League 2.

== History ==
Satun football team was known as one of the most successful provincial team in the past. The team won Yamaha Thailand Cup consecutively in year 1991 and 1992, which was underestimated by football guru, media, and publics at that time. The championship came into reality just like a magic, and that was the story behind naming Satun Football Team as The Ultimate Exorcists. This catchword had been widespread by media and fans till it became a nickname of the team. Although, a style of Satun football team was very much alike to Brazilian football style but it did not make its way to convince media to report in that way.

=== Crest history ===
Club crest (2019)

Club crest (2020–2023)

Club crest (2023–present)

== Honours ==
=== Domestic leagues ===
- Thai League 4 Southern Region
  - Winners (3): 2017, 2018, 2019
- Regional League South Division
  - Winners (1): 2015
  - Runners-up (2): 2009, 2014
- Thailand Semi-Pro League
  - Winners (1): 2023

==== Cups ====
- Thai League 3 Cup
  - Winners (1): 2025-26

== Stadium and locations ==
Coordinates	Location	Stadium	Year
6°36′24″N 100°05′16″E	Satun	Ratchakit Prakan Stadium	2007
6°39′05″N 100°04′43″E	Satun	Satun Province Stadium (P.O.A.)	2008–2012
6°36′24″N 100°05′16″E	Satun	Ratchakit Prakan Stadium	2013
6°39′05″N 100°04′43″E	Satun	Satun Province Stadium (P.O.A.)	2014–

== Seasons ==
Season	League									FA Cup	League Cup	T3 Cup	Top goalscorer	
Season	Division	P	W	D	L	F	A	Pts	Pos	FA Cup	League Cup	T3 Cup	Name	Goals
1999–00	Pro League	22	13	6	3	48	32	34	3rd	Opted out				
2003	Pro League	22	4	2	16	16	77	14	12th	Opted out				
2007	DIV2	22	7	5	10	36	33	26	9th	Opted out				
2008	DIV2 A	20	3	4	13	26	46	13	10th	Opted out				
2009	South	14	10	4	0	37	14	24	2nd	Opted out				
2010	South	24	10	8	6	33	27	38	4th	Opted out	Opted out			
2011	South	24	10	4	10	31	32	34	6th	Opted out	Opted out			
2012	South	20	6	9	5	27	26	27	5th	Opted out	Opted out			
2013	South	20	7	4	9	17	26	25	7th	Opted out	Opted out			
2014	South	24	13	9	2	46	17	48	2nd	Opted out	Opted out			
2015	South	18	9	7	2	32	15	34	1st	R3	Opted out			
2016	South	22	8	8	6	31	26	32	7th	Opted out	R1			
2017	T4 South	24	17	4	3	42	16	55	1st	Opted out	1st QF		(Japan) Daiki Konomura	10
2018	T4 South	21	13	7	1	52	20	46	1st	Opted out	Opted out		(Brazil) Martins Caio Henrique	10
2019	T4 South	24	14	5	5	47	17	47	1st	R1	1st QF		(Brazil) Caio Rodrigues da Cruz	13
2020–21	T3 South	17	5	4	8	29	23	19	9th	Opted out	Opted out		(Thailand) Pronthep Heemla	8
2021–22	T3 South	24	8	4	12	40	42	28	8th	QR	QR2		(Thailand) Thanphisit Hempandan	9
2023	TA South	2	2	0	0	7	0	6	1st	Opted out	Opted out		(Thailand) Akrom Mamood	4
2023–24	T3 South	22	10	6	6	27	19	36	4th	Opted out	R2	QR2	(Brazil) Douglas Mineiro	11
2024–25	T3 South	22	8	9	5	19	18	33	5th	Opted out	QR1	LP	(Brazil) Natan Oliveira	6
2025–26	T3 South	18	11	4	3	31	11	37	2nd	Opted out	R1	W		

Champions	Runners-up	Promoted	Relegated

== Players ==
=== Current squad ===
As of 31 July 2026

Note: Flags indicate national team as defined under FIFA eligibility rules; some limited exceptions apply. Players may hold more than one non-FIFA nationality.

No.	Pos.	Nation	Player
4	DF	THA	Chaiwat Pairot
6	DF	THA	Charudet Yara
7	MF	THA	Chaiya Nakkaree (captain)
8	MF	THA	Firahan Yalee
9	FW	BRA	Caio da Conceição Silva
10	MF	BRA	Jhon Cley
11	FW	COL	Maurício Cortés
14	DF	BRA	Janclesio
15	MF	THA	Phattharaphon Jansuwan
19	MF	THA	Akkhadet Suksiri
21	MF	THA	Nattawut Jaroenboot
24	DF	THA	Kantapol Sompittayanurak

No.	Pos.	Nation	Player
25	GK	THA	Amran Bungosayu
29	FW	THA	Phuwanat Saranopphakhun
34	DF	THA	Kittikon Khetpara
35	DF	THA	Natthaphon Hehna
38	GK	THA	Wuttichai Panboot
39	DF	THA	Wattanaporn Donmngkan
43	GK	THA	Apinan Puhat
44	FW	THA	Kittiphong Khetpara
55	FW	THA	Chakhrit Liwang
60	GK	THA	Watchara Buathong
63	DF	THA	Jhetsaphat Kuantanom (on loan from Buriram United)
69	GK	THA	Faowas Chewae
77	MF	THA	Wathit Nakkari
96	MF	THA	Nanthalak Kaesaman
98	FW	THA	Arnuh Wongwaen

== Coaching staff ==
Position	Name
Chairman	(Thailand) Pongphat Thing-nui
Chairman Advisor	(Thailand) Samrit Liengprasit (Thailand) Pibul Ratchakitprakran
Club Advisor	(Thailand) Kanesh Taengrit (Thailand) Phutthapong Kositphupakul
Team manager	(Thailand) Pheeraphat Ratchakitprakran
Head coach	(Thailand) Maka Hoprasartsuk
Assistant coach	(Cameroon) Hilary Ngehatoh (Thailand) Nasruddin Hubyusoh
Goalkeeper coach	Vacant
Fitness coach	Vacant
Analyst	Vacant
Physiotherapist	Vacant
Kitman	Vacant
