= 2016 Football Division 3 =

- Season: 2016
- Champions: Regional stage Changphueak Chiang Mai (Northern); Wang Saphung (North Eastern); Bankhai United (Eastern); Singburi Kopoon (Central); Surat Thani United (Southern)

The 2016 Football Division 3 is the 1st season of the League competition since its establishment in 2016. It is in the fourth tier of the Thai football league system.

== Northern Region ==
=== Teams ===
Section	Club	province	Years
1	Saenkhan	Uttaradit	2016
1	Pibulsongkram Rajabhat University	Phitsanulok	2016
1	Amnuaysilpa Alumni (Thai: สมาคมนักเรียนเก่าอำนวยศิลป์)	Bangkok	2016
2	Institution of Physical Education Chiang Mai Campus (Thai: สถาบันการพลศึกษา วิทยาเขตเชียงใหม่)	Chiang Mai	2016
2	Northern Tak United	Tak	2016
2	Chainat United	Chai Nat	2016
3	Prachum Nongcheck (Thai: สโมสรประชุมน้องเชค)	Suphanburi	2016
3	Nakhon Mae Sot United	Tak	2016
3	Maejo United	Chiang Mai	2016
4	Nong Bua City	Nong Bua Lamphu	2016
4	Chiangrai Wonderkid for AEC (Thai: เชียงรายวันเดอร์ คิด ฟอร์ เออีซี)	Chiangrai	2016
4	Phetchabun (Thai: สมาคมกีฬาฟุตบอลจังหวัดเพชรบูรณ์)	Phetchabun	2016
4	Changphueak Chiang Mai	Chiang Mai	2016

=== Format ===
Group stage: A total 13 clubs will be divided into four groups of three clubs except group 4 which has four clubs to play round-robin matches at a neutral venue. The best two clubs of each group will qualify to the knock-out stage.

Knock-out stage: A total of 8 clubs which has qualified from the group stage will play single-elimination stage until there are only two finalists of the tournament.

=== Group A ===
Pos	Team	Pld	W	D	L	GF	GA	GD	Pts	Qualification or relegation
1	Amnuaysilpa Alumni (drew in 1st position)	2	1	1	0	7	2	+5	4	Qualification to Quarter-finals Round
2	Pibulsongkram Rajabhat University (drew in 2nd position)	2	1	1	0	8	1	+7	4	Qualification to Quarter-finals Round
3	Saenkhan	2	0	0	2	1	13	−12	0	

Updated to match(es) played on unknown. Source: Thai Division 3
Rules for classification: 1) points; 2) goal difference; 3) number of goals scored.

7 January 2017	Pibulsongkram Rajabhat University	7 – 0	Saenkhan	Chiang Mai
10:00 (UTC+7)				Stadium: Maejo University Stadium

9 January 2017	Pibulsongkram Rajabhat University	1 – 1	Amnuaysilpa Alumni	Chiang Mai
13:00 (UTC+7)				Stadium: Maejo University Stadium

11 January 2017	Amnuaysilpa Alumni	6 – 1	Saenkhan	Chiang Mai
10:00 (UTC+7)	Saenkhan			Stadium: Maejo University Stadium

=== Group B ===
Pos	Team	Pld	W	D	L	GF	GA	GD	Pts	Qualification or relegation
1	Chainat United	2	1	1	0	2	1	+1	4	Qualification to Quarter-finals Round
2	Institution of Physical Education Chiang Mai Campus	2	1	0	1	3	2	+1	3	Qualification to Quarter-finals Round
3	Northern Tak United	2	0	1	1	0	2	−2	1	

Updated to match(es) played on unknown. Source: Thai Division 3
Rules for classification: 1) points; 2) goal difference; 3) number of goals scored.

7 January 2017	Institution of Physical Education Chiang Mai Campus	2 – 0	Northern Tak United	Chiang Mai
13:00 (UTC+7)				Stadium: Maejo University Stadium

9 January 2017	Northern Tak United	0 – 0	Chainat United	Chiang Mai
10:00 (UTC+7)				Stadium: Maejo University Stadium

11 January 2017	Chainat United	2 – 1	Institution of Physical Education Chiang Mai Campus	Chiang Mai
13:00 (UTC+7)				Stadium: Maejo University Stadium

=== Group C ===
Pos	Team	Pld	W	D	L	GF	GA	GD	Pts	Qualification or relegation
1	Maejo United	2	2	0	0	13	0	+13	6	Qualification to Quarter-finals Round
2	Nakhon Mae Sot United	2	1	0	1	12	1	+11	3	Qualification to Quarter-finals Round
3	Prachum Nongcheck	2	0	0	2	0	24	−24	0	

Updated to match(es) played on unknown. Source: Thai Division 3
Rules for classification: 1) points; 2) goal difference; 3) number of goals scored.

7 January 2017	Nakhon Mae Sot United	12 – 0	Prachum Nongcheck	Chiang Mai
16:00 (UTC+7)				Stadium: Maejo University Stadium

9 January 2017	Maejo United	1 – 0	Nakhon Mae Sot United	Chiang Mai
16:00 (UTC+7)				Stadium: Maejo University Stadium

11 January 2017	Maejo United	12 – 0	Prachum Nongcheck	Chiang Mai
16:00 (UTC+7)				Stadium: Maejo University Stadium

=== Group D ===
Pos	Team	Pld	W	D	L	GF	GA	GD	Pts	Qualification or relegation
1	Changphueak Chiang Mai	3	3	0	0	13	4	+9	9	Qualification to Quarter-finals Round
2	Phetchabun	3	2	0	1	9	6	+3	6	Qualification to Quarter-finals Round
3	Nong Bua City	3	1	0	2	4	6	−2	3	
4	Chiangrai Wonderkid for AEC	3	0	0	3	2	12	−10	0	

Updated to match(es) played on unknown. Source: Thai Division 3
Rules for classification: 1) points; 2) goal difference; 3) number of goals scored.

8 January 2017	Nong Bua City	1 – 0	Chiangrai Wonderkid for AEC	Chiang Mai
13:00 (UTC+7)				Stadium: Chiang Mai University Stadium

8 January 2017	Changphueak Chiang Mai	4 – 1	Phetchabun	Chiang Mai
16:00 (UTC+7)				Stadium: Chiang Mai University Stadium

10 January 2017	Phetchabun	3 – 2	Nong Bua City	Chiang Mai
13:00 (UTC+7)				Stadium: Chiang Mai University Stadium

10 January 2017	Changphueak Chiang Mai	6 – 2	Chiangrai Wonderkid for AEC	Chiang Mai
13:00 (UTC+7)				Stadium: Chiang Mai University Stadium

12 January 2017	Phetchabun	5 – 0	Chiangrai Wonderkid for AEC	Chiang Mai
13:00 (UTC+7)				Stadium: Chiang Mai University Stadium

12 January 2017	Changphueak Chiang Mai	3 – 1	Nong Bua City	Chiang Mai
16:00 (UTC+7)				Stadium: Chiang Mai University Stadium

=== Quarter-finals Round ===
13 January 2017	Amnuaysilpa Alumni	0 – 3	Institution of Physical Education Chiang Mai Campus	Chiang Mai
13:00 (UTC+7)				Stadium: Maejo University Stadium

13 January 2017	Chainat United	2 – 0	Pibulsongkram Rajabhat University	Chiang Mai
16:00 (UTC+7)				Stadium: Maejo University Stadium

14 January 2017	Phetchabun	1 – 0 *	Maejo United	Chiang Mai
13:00 (UTC+7)		Phetchabun sent Professional football player,who was registered by Chanthaburi in 2016, although it break the law.		Stadium: Maejo University Stadium

14 January 2017	Nakhon Mae Sot United	1(3) – 1(5)	Changphueak Chiang Mai	Chiang Mai
16:00 (UTC+7)				Stadium: Maejo University Stadium

=== Semi-finals Round ===
16 January 2017	Maejo United	0(3) – 0(4)	Institution of Physical Education Chiang Mai Campus	Chiang Mai
13:00 (UTC+7)				Stadium: Maejo University Stadium

16 January 2017	Chainat United	0 – 4	Changphueak Chiang Mai	Chiang Mai
16:00 (UTC+7)				Stadium: Maejo University Stadium

=== Final round ===
18 January 2017	Institution of Physical Education Chiang Mai Campus	1(3) – 1(5)	Changphueak Chiang Mai	Chiang Mai
16:00 (UTC+7)				Stadium: Maejo University Stadium

== North Eastern Region ==
=== Member clubs ===
Section	Club	province	Years
1	Nakhon Ratchasima United	Nakhon Ratchasima	2016
1	Korat City	Nakhon Ratchasima	2016
1	Korat	Nakhon Ratchasima	2016
2	Bundit Asia College	Khon Kaen	2016
2	Wang Saphung	Loei	2016
2	Huai Thalaeng	Nakhon Ratchasima	2016
3	Nong Han	Udon Thani	2016
3	Pern Pak Chong	Nakhon Ratchasima	2016
3	TWD Tanaytum	Sisaket	2016
3	Korat United	Nakhon Ratchasima	2016

=== Format ===
Group stage: A total 10 clubs will be divided into four groups of three clubs except group 3 which has four clubs to play round-robin matches at a neutral venue. The best two clubs of group A and B, The best three clubs of group C and The best points of 3rd position in group A and B will qualify to the knock-out stage.

Knock-out stage: A total of 8 clubs which has qualified from the group stage will play single-elimination stage until there are only two finalists of the tournament.

=== Group A ===
Pos	Team	Pld	W	D	L	GF	GA	GD	Pts	Qualification or relegation
1	Nakhon Ratchasima United (drew in 1st position)	2	1	1	0	1	0	+1	4	Qualification to Quarter-finals Round
2	Korat (drew in 2nd position)	2	1	1	0	6	2	+4	4	Qualification to Quarter-finals Round
3	Korat City	2	0	0	2	2	7	−5	0	

Updated to match(es) played on unknown. Source: Thai Division 3
Rules for classification: 1) points; 2) goal difference; 3) number of goals scored.

16 December 2016	Korat	0 – 0	Nakhon Ratchasima United	Loei
13:00 (UTC+7)				Stadium: Wang Saphung District Stadium

18 December 2016	Nakhon Ratchasima United	1 – 0	Korat City	Loei
13:00 (UTC+7)				Stadium: Wang Saphung District Stadium

20 December 2016	Korat City	2 – 6	Korat	Loei
13:00 (UTC+7)				Stadium: Wang Saphung District Stadium

=== Group B ===
Pos	Team	Pld	W	D	L	GF	GA	GD	Pts	Qualification or relegation
1	Huai Thalaeng	2	2	0	0	7	3	+4	6	Qualification to Quarter-finals Round
2	Wang Saphung	2	1	0	1	6	5	+1	3	Qualification to Quarter-finals Round
3	Bundit Asia College (drew in The best points of 3rd position in all groups)	2	0	0	2	2	7	−5	0	Qualification to Quarter-finals Round

Updated to match(es) played on unknown. Source: Thai Division 3
Rules for classification: 1) points; 2) goal difference; 3) number of goals scored.

16 December 2016	Huai Thalaeng	3 – 1	Wang Saphung	Loei
16:00 (UTC+7)				Stadium: Wang Saphung District Stadium

18 December 2016	Bundit Asia College	1 – 4	Wang Saphung	Loei
16:00 (UTC+7)				Stadium: Wang Saphung District Stadium

20 December 2016	Wang Saphung	2 – 4	Huai Thalaeng	Loei
16:00 (UTC+7)				Stadium: Wang Saphung District Stadium

=== Group C ===
Pos	Team	Pld	W	D	L	GF	GA	GD	Pts	Qualification or relegation
1	Nong Han	3	2	1	0	4	1	+3	7	Qualification to Quarter-finals Round
2	Korat United	3	2	0	1	6	3	+3	6	Qualification to Quarter-finals Round
3	TWD Tanaytum	3	1	1	1	4	4	0	4	Qualification to Quarter-finals Round
4	Pern Pak Chong	3	0	0	3	4	10	−6	0	

Updated to match(es) played on unknown. Source: Thai Division 3
Rules for classification: 1) points; 2) goal difference; 3) number of goals scored.

17 December 2016	Nong Han	2 – 0	Pern Pak Chong	Loei
13:00 (UTC+7)				Stadium: Wang Saphung District Stadium

17 December 2016	TWD Tanaytum	0 – 1	Korat United	Loei
16:00 (UTC+7)				Stadium: Wang Saphung District Stadium

19 December 2016	Nong Han	1 – 1	TWD Tanaytum	Loei
13:00 (UTC+7)				Stadium: Wang Saphung District Stadium

19 December 2016	Pern Pak Chong	2 – 5	Korat United	Loei
16:00 (UTC+7)				Stadium: Wang Saphung District Stadium

21 December 2016	Pern Pak Chong	2 – 3	TWD Tanaytum	Loei
13:00 (UTC+7)				Stadium: Wang Saphung District Stadium

21 December 2016	Korat United	0 – 1	Nong Han	Loei
16:00 (UTC+7)				Stadium: Wang Saphung District Stadium

=== Quarter-finals Round ===
23 December 2016	TWD Tanaytum	3 – 1	Nakhon Ratchasima United	Loei
13:00 (UTC+7)				Stadium: Wang Saphung District Stadium

24 December 2016	Huai Thalaeng	2 – 1	Korat United	Loei
13:00 (UTC+7)				Stadium: Wang Saphung District Stadium

23 December 2016	Wang Saphung	2(7) – 2(5)	Korat	Loei
16:00 (UTC+7)				Stadium: Wang Saphung District Stadium

24 December 2016	Nong Han	3 – 0	Bundit Asia College	Loei
16:00 (UTC+7)				Stadium: Wang Saphung District Stadium

=== Semi-finals Round ===
26 December 2016	TWD Tanaytum	3 – 1	Huai Thalaeng	Loei
13:00 (UTC+7)				Stadium: Wang Saphung District Stadium

26 December 2016	Wang Saphung	2 – 0	Nong Han	Loei
16:00 (UTC+7)				Stadium: Wang Saphung District Stadium

=== Final round ===
28 December 2016	TWD Tanaytum	0 – 6	Wang Saphung	Loei
13:00 (UTC+7)				Stadium: Wang Saphung District Stadium

== Eastern Region ==
=== Member clubs ===
Section	Club	Province	Years
1	ACDC	Chonburi	2016
1	Navanakorn	Pathum Thani	2016
1	Assumption College Sriracha	Chonburi	2016
2	Na-Me United	Bangkok	2016
2	Siriroj	Chonburi	2016
2	Khaobaisri	Rayong	2016
3	Traf Maptaphut	Rayong	2016
3	Bankhai United	Rayong	2016
3	Takhiantia	Chonburi	2016
4	Hakka Association of Thailand	Bangkok	2016
4	Kohkwang Subdistrict Municipality	Chanthaburi	2016
4	Pattana	Chonburi	2016
5	Rayong City	Rayong	2016
5	Isan Pattaya	Chonburi	2016
5	Banbung Rovers	Chonburi	2016
6	Sansuk Municipality Meangkanyang	Chonburi	2016
6	Pak Chong City	Nakhon Ratchasima	2016
6	Bangpakong Sports Association	Chachoengsao	2016
7	Institute of Physical Education Chonburi	Chonburi	2016
7	Pattaya City Club	Chonburi	2016
7	Salaeng Subdistrict Municipality	Chanthaburi	2016

=== Format ===
Group stage: A total 21 clubs will be divided into four groups of three clubs except group 7 which has four clubs to play round-robin matches at a neutral venue. The best clubs of group A and G qualify to Quarter-finals round of the knock-out stage. The best two clubs of group B, C, D, E, F and runner-up of group A and G will qualify to Second round of the knock-out stage.

Knock-out stage: A total of 14 clubs which has qualified from the group stage will play single-elimination stage until there are only two finalists of the tournament.

=== Group A ===
Pos	Team	Pld	W	D	L	GF	GA	GD	Pts	Qualification or relegation
1	ACDC	2	2	0	0	9	1	+8	6	Qualification to Quarter-finals Round
2	Assumption College Sriracha	2	1	0	1	5	8	−3	3	Qualification to Second round
3	Navanakorn	2	0	0	2	3	8	−5	0	

Updated to match(es) played on unknown. Source: Thai Division 3
Rules for classification: 1) points; 2) goal difference; 3) number of goals scored.

15 December 2016	ACDC	4 – 0	Navanakorn	Chonburi
13:00 (UTC+7)				Stadium: Chon Buri Sport School Artificial turf Football Field

17 December 2016	Assumption College Sriracha	4 – 3	Navanakorn	Chonburi
15:00 (UTC+7)				Stadium: Chon Buri Sport School Artificial turf Football Field

19 December 2016	ACDC	5 – 1	Assumption College Sriracha	Chonburi
15:00 (UTC+7)				Stadium: Chon Buri Sport School Artificial turf Football Field

=== Group B ===
Pos	Team	Pld	W	D	L	GF	GA	GD	Pts	Qualification or relegation
1	Na-Me United	2	1	1	0	3	2	+1	4	Qualification to Second round
2	Khaobaisri	2	1	0	1	1	1	0	3	Qualification to Second round
3	Siriroj	2	0	1	1	2	3	−1	1	

Updated to match(es) played on unknown. Source: Thai Division 3
Rules for classification: 1) points; 2) goal difference; 3) number of goals scored.

15 December 2016	Na-Me United	2 – 2	Siriroj	Chonburi
15:00 (UTC+7)				Stadium: Chon Buri Sport School Artificial turf Football Field

17 December 2016	Khaobaisri	1 – 0	Siriroj	Chonburi
17:00 (UTC+7)				Stadium: Chon Buri Sport School Artificial turf Football Field

20 December 2016	Na-Me United	1 – 0	Khaobaisri	Chonburi
13:00 (UTC+7)				Stadium: Chon Buri Sport School Artificial turf Football Field

=== Group C ===
Pos	Team	Pld	W	D	L	GF	GA	GD	Pts	Qualification or relegation
1	Traf Maptaphut	2	2	0	0	7	1	+6	6	Qualification to Second round
2	Bankhai United	2	1	0	1	9	2	+7	3	Qualification to Second round
3	Takhiantia	2	0	0	2	2	15	−13	0	

Updated to match(es) played on unknown. Source: Thai Division 3
Rules for classification: 1) points; 2) goal difference; 3) number of goals scored.

15 December 2016	Traf Maptaphut	1 – 0	Bankhai United	Chonburi
17:00 (UTC+7)				Stadium: Chon Buri Sport School Artificial turf Football Field

18 December 2016	Bankhai United	9 – 1	Takhiantia	Chonburi
13:00 (UTC+7)				Stadium: Chon Buri Sport School Artificial turf Football Field

20 December 2016	Traf Maptaphut	6 – 1	Takhiantia	Chonburi
15:00 (UTC+7)				Stadium: Chon Buri Sport School Artificial turf Football Field

=== Group D ===
Pos	Team	Pld	W	D	L	GF	GA	GD	Pts	Qualification or relegation
1	Pattana	2	2	0	0	6	3	+3	6	Qualification to Second round
2	Hakka Association of Thailand (drew in 2nd position)	2	0	1	1	2	3	−1	1	Qualification to Second round
3	Kohkwang Subdistrict Municipality (drew in 3rd position)	2	0	1	1	3	5	−2	1	

Updated to match(es) played on unknown. Source: Thai Division 3
Rules for classification: 1) points; 2) goal difference; 3) number of goals scored.

16 December 2016	Kohkwang Subdistrict Municipality	1 – 1	Hakka Association of Thailand	Chonburi
13:00 (UTC+7)				Stadium: Chon Buri Sport School Artificial turf Football Field

18 December 2016	Pattana	4 – 2	Kohkwang Subdistrict Municipality	Chonburi
15:00 (UTC+7)				Stadium: Chon Buri Sport School Artificial turf Football Field

20 December 2016	Pattana	2 – 1	Hakka Association of Thailand	Chonburi
17:00 (UTC+7)				Stadium: Chon Buri Sport School Artificial turf Football Field

=== Group E ===
Pos	Team	Pld	W	D	L	GF	GA	GD	Pts	Qualification or relegation
1	Isan Pattaya	2	2	0	0	15	1	+14	6	Qualification to Second round
2	Rayong City	2	1	0	1	7	9	−2	3	Qualification to Second round
3	Banbung Rovers	2	0	0	2	1	13	−12	0	

Updated to match(es) played on unknown. Source: Thai Division 3
Rules for classification: 1) points; 2) goal difference; 3) number of goals scored.

16 December 2016	Isan Pattaya	8 – 1	Rayong City	Chonburi
15:00 (UTC+7)				Stadium: Chon Buri Sport School Artificial turf Football Field

18 December 2016	Isan Pattaya	7 – 0	Banbung Rovers	Chonburi
17:00 (UTC+7)				Stadium: Chon Buri Sport School Artificial turf Football Field

21 December 2016	Rayong City	6 – 1	Banbung Rovers	Chonburi
13:00 (UTC+7)				Stadium: Chon Buri Sport School Artificial turf Football Field

=== Group F ===
Pos	Team	Pld	W	D	L	GF	GA	GD	Pts	Qualification or relegation
1	Sansuk Municipality Meangkanyang	2	1	1	0	5	4	+1	4	Qualification to Second round
2	Pak Chong City	2	1	0	1	4	2	+2	3	Qualification to Second round
3	Bangpakong Sports Association	2	0	1	1	3	6	−3	1	

Updated to match(es) played on unknown. Source: Thai Division 3
Rules for classification: 1) points; 2) goal difference; 3) number of goals scored.

16 December 2016	Sansuk Municipality Meangkanyang	2 – 1	Pak Chong City	Chonburi
17:00 (UTC+7)				Stadium: Chon Buri Sport School Artificial turf Football Field

19 December 2016	Pak Chong City	3 – 0	Bangpakong Sports Association	Chonburi
13:00 (UTC+7)				Stadium: Chon Buri Sport School Artificial turf Football Field

21 December 2016	Sansuk Municipality Meangkanyang	3 – 3	Bangpakong Sports Association	Chonburi
15:00 (UTC+7)				Stadium: Chon Buri Sport School Artificial turf Football Field

=== Group G ===
Pos	Team	Pld	W	D	L	GF	GA	GD	Pts	Qualification or relegation
1	Pattaya City Club	2	2	0	0	5	0	+5	6	Qualification to Quarter-finals Round
2	Institute of Physical Education Chonburi	2	1	0	1	4	3	+1	3	Qualification to Second round
3	Salaeng Subdistrict Municipality	2	0	0	2	2	8	−6	0	

Updated to match(es) played on unknown. Source: Thai Division 3
Rules for classification: 1) points; 2) goal difference; 3) number of goals scored.

17 December 2016	Pattaya City Club	1 – 0	Institute of Physical Education Chonburi	Chonburi
13:00 (UTC+7)				Stadium: Chon Buri Sport School Artificial turf Football Field

19 December 2016	Pattaya City Club	4 – 0	Salaeng Subdistrict Municipality	Chonburi
17:00 (UTC+7)				Stadium: Chon Buri Sport School Artificial turf Football Field

21 December 2016	Institute of Physical Education Chonburi	4 – 2	Salaeng Subdistrict Municipality	Chonburi
17:00 (UTC+7)				Stadium: Chon Buri Sport School Artificial turf Football Field

=== Second round ===
22 December 2016	Assumption College Sriracha	2 – 0	Na-Me United	Chonburi
13:00 (UTC+7)				Stadium: Chon Buri Sport School Artificial turf Football Field

22 December 2016	Khaobaisri	4 – 0	Traf Maptaphut	Chonburi
15:00 (UTC+7)				Stadium: Chon Buri Sport School Artificial turf Football Field

22 December 2016	Bankhai United	3 – 1	Pattana	Chonburi
17:00 (UTC+7)				Stadium: Chon Buri Sport School Artificial turf Football Field

23 December 2016	Hakka Association of Thailand	1 – 2	Isan Pattaya	Chonburi
13:00 (UTC+7)				Stadium: Chon Buri Sport School Artificial turf Football Field

23 December 2016	Rayong City	0 – 5	Sansuk Municipality Meangkanyang	Chonburi
15:00 (UTC+7)				Stadium: Chon Buri Sport School Artificial turf Football Field

23 December 2016	Pak Chong City	2 – 1	Institute of Physical Education Chonburi	Chonburi
17:00 (UTC+7)				Stadium: Chon Buri Sport School Artificial turf Football Field

=== Quarter-finals Round ===
25 December 2016	ACDC	0(4) – 0(2)	Pattaya City Club	Chonburi
13:00 (UTC+7)				Stadium: Chon Buri Sport School Artificial turf Football Field

25 December 2016	Assumption College Sriracha	2 – 3	Isan Pattaya	Chonburi
15:00 (UTC+7)				Stadium: Chon Buri Sport School Artificial turf Football Field

26 December 2016	Khaobaisri	2(4) – 2(6)	Sansuk Municipality Meangkanyang	Chonburi
13:00 (UTC+7)				Stadium: Chon Buri Sport School Artificial turf Football Field

26 December 2016	Bankhai United	2 – 1	Pak Chong City	Chonburi
15:00 (UTC+7)				Stadium: Chon Buri Sport School Artificial turf Football Field

=== Semi-finals Round ===
28 December 2016	ACDC	1(7) – 1(6)	Sansuk Municipality Meangkanyang	Chonburi
13:00 (UTC+7)				Stadium: Chon Buri Sport School Artificial turf Football Field

28 December 2016	Isan Pattaya	0(5) – 0(6)	Bankhai United	Chonburi
15:00 (UTC+7)				Stadium: Chon Buri Sport School Artificial turf Football Field

=== Final round ===
30 December 2016	ACDC	1(3) – 1(4)	Bankhai United	Chonburi
13:00 (UTC+7)				Stadium: Chon Buri Sport School Artificial turf Football Field

== Central Region ==
=== Member clubs ===
Group	Club	Province	Years
1	Thonburi University	Bangkok	2016
1	Nongkhae	Nakhon Nayok	2016
1	Krirk University	Bangkok	2016
2	Tan Diao TAO	Saraburi	2016
2	Mahidol University Sport Science	Bangkok	2016
2	Air Technical Training School	Bangkok	2016
3	Metropolitan Electricity Authority	Bangkok	2016
3	Ayodhya City	Ayutthaya	2016
3	Klongluang Rockyrose	Pathum Thani	2016
4	DHL All Stars	Bangkok	2016
4	Laem Sing Fisheries Association	Chanthaburi	2016
4	Bang Mueang Municipality	Samut Prakan	2016
5	Ratchadamnoen Commercial School	Bangkok	2016
5	Donmuang Police Station	Bangkok	2016
5	Jim Thompson Farm	Nakhon Ratchasima	2016
6	Vongchavalitkul University	Nakhon Ratchasima	2016
6	Dhurakij Pundit University	Bangkok	2016
6	Samutsakhonwittayalai School	Samut Sakhon	2016
7	Traill International school	Bangkok	2016
7	Angthong United	Ang Thong	2016
7	Playmaker United	Bangkok	2016
8	Therdthai Diamond	Bangkok	2016
8	Wat Suthiwararam Alumni Association	Bangkok	2016
8	Naval Medical Department	Bangkok	2016
9	Sing Ubon	Ubon Ratchathani	2016
9	Debsirin Alumni Association	Bangkok	2016
9	New Bridge Thonglor	Bangkok	2016
10	Yingcharoen	Nonthaburi	2016
10	King Mongkut's University of Technology North Bangkok	Bangkok	2016
10	Dontan PCCM	Mukdahan	2016
11	Chandrakasem Rajabhat University	Bangkok	2016
11	Royal Thai Air Force Welfare Department	Bangkok	2016
11	KrungKao	Ayutthaya	2016
12	Bang Pa-In School	Ayutthaya	2016
12	Royal Thai Air Force Academy	Bangkok	2016
12	Bangplub	Nonthaburi	2016
13	Singburi United	Sing Buri	2016
13	Bansomdejchaopraya Rajabhat University	Bangkok	2016
13	Tanmananusorn Foundation	Bangkok	2016
14	Ramkhamhaeng University	Bangkok	2016
14	Pichaya Kasem Technological College	Bangkok	2016
14	Mahanakorn	Bangkok	2016
15	Nakornpathom Rajabhat University	Nakhon Pathom	2016
15	Forester	Bangkok	2016
15	Petchchaiyapruek	Bangkok	2016
16	Uthenthawai	Bangkok	2016
16	Lumplee Subdistrict Municipality	Ayutthaya	2016
16	Kasetsart University Kamphaeng Saen Campus	Nakhon Pathom	2016
17	Phon Commercial and Technical College	Khon Kaen	2016
17	Wangpailom SC	Bangkok	2016
17	SWU United	Bangkok	2016
17	Wat Suthiwararam School	Bangkok	2016
18	Ratchaburi NNK BPF United	Ratchaburi	2016
18	Singburi Kopoon	Singburi	2016
18	Rajamangala University Of Technology Rattanakosin	Bangkok	2016
18	Bangpla CCP	Samut Prakan	2016

=== Format ===
Group stage: A total 54 clubs will be divided into four groups of three clubs except group 18 which has four clubs to play round-robin matches at a neutral venue. The best clubs of group A and G qualify to Quarter-finals round of the knock-out stage. The best clubs of group B, C, E, F, G and H, The best two clubs of group A, D, I, J, K, L, M, N, O, P, Q and R will qualify to third round of the knock-out stage. Runner-up of group E, F, G and H will qualify to second round of the knock-out stage.

Knock-out stage: A total of 18 clubs which has qualified from the group stage will play single-elimination stage until there are only two finalists of the tournament.

=== Group A ===
Pos	Team	Pld	W	D	L	GF	GA	GD	Pts	Qualification or relegation
1	Nongkhae	2	2	0	0	3	0	+3	6	Qualification to Third round
2	Thonburi University	2	1	0	1	3	2	+1	3	Qualification to Third round
3	Krirk University	2	0	0	2	0	4	−4	0	

Updated to match(es) played on unknown. Source: Thai Division 3
Rules for classification: 1) points; 2) goal difference; 3) number of goals scored.

7 January 2017	Thonburi University	0 – 2	Nongkhae	Bangkok
10:00 (UTC+7)				Stadium: Nong Chok National Football Center 1

9 January 2017	Nongkhae	1 – 0	Krirk University	Bangkok
15:00 (UTC+7)				Stadium: Nong Chok National Football Center 1

11 January 2017	Krirk University	0 – 3	Thonburi University	Bangkok
13:00 (UTC+7)				Stadium: Nong Chok National Football Center 2

=== Group B ===
Pos	Team	Pld	W	D	L	GF	GA	GD	Pts	Qualification or relegation
1	Tan Diao TAO (drew in 1st position)	2	1	1	0	3	1	+2	4	Qualification to Third round
2	Mahidol University Sport Science (drew in 2nd position)	2	1	1	0	3	1	+2	4	
3	Air Technical Training School	2	0	0	2	0	4	−4	0	

Updated to match(es) played on unknown. Source: Thai Division 3
Rules for classification: 1) points; 2) goal difference; 3) number of goals scored.

7 January 2017	Tan Diao TAO	1 – 1	Mahidol University Sport Science	Bangkok
13:00 (UTC+7)				Stadium: Nong Chok National Football Center 1

9 January 2017	Mahidol University Sport Science	2 – 0	Air Technical Training School	Bangkok
10:00 (UTC+7)				Stadium: Nong Chok National Football Center 2

11 January 2017	Air Technical Training School	0 – 2	Tan Diao TAO	Bangkok
15:00 (UTC+7)				Stadium: Nong Chok National Football Center 2

=== Group C ===
Pos	Team	Pld	W	D	L	GF	GA	GD	Pts	Qualification or relegation
1	Ayodhya City	2	2	0	0	14	0	+14	6	Qualification to Third round
2	Klongluang Rockyrose (drew in 2nd position)	2	0	1	1	2	12	−10	1	
3	Metropolitan Electricity Authority (drew in 3rd position)	2	0	1	1	2	6	−4	1	

Updated to match(es) played on unknown. Source: Thai Division 3
Rules for classification: 1) points; 2) goal difference; 3) number of goals scored.

7 January 2017	Metropolitan Electricity Authority	0 – 4	Ayodhya City	Bangkok
15:00 (UTC+7)				Stadium: Nong Chok National Football Center 1

9 January 2017	Ayodhya City	10 – 0	Klongluang Rockyrose	Bangkok
13:00 (UTC+7)				Stadium: Nong Chok National Football Center 2

11 January 2017	Klongluang Rockyrose	2 – 2	Metropolitan Electricity Authority	Bangkok
10:00 (UTC+7)				Stadium: Nong Chok National Football Center 3

=== Group D ===
Pos	Team	Pld	W	D	L	GF	GA	GD	Pts	Qualification or relegation
1	Laem Sing Fisheries Association	2	1	1	0	3	2	+1	4	Qualification to Third round
2	DHL All Stars	2	1	0	1	5	2	+3	3	Qualification to Third round
3	Bang Mueang Municipality	2	0	1	1	1	5	−4	1	

Updated to match(es) played on unknown. Source: Thai Division 3
Rules for classification: 1) points; 2) goal difference; 3) number of goals scored.

7 January 2017	DHL All Stars	1 – 2	Laem Sing Fisheries Association	Bangkok
10:00 (UTC+7)				Stadium: Nong Chok National Football Center 2

9 January 2017	Laem Sing Fisheries Association	1 – 1	Bang Mueang Municipality	Bangkok
15:00 (UTC+7)				Stadium: Nong Chok National Football Center 2

11 January 2017	Bang Mueang Municipality	0 – 4	DHL All Stars	Bangkok
13:00 (UTC+7)				Stadium: Nong Chok National Football Center 3

=== Group E ===
Pos	Team	Pld	W	D	L	GF	GA	GD	Pts	Qualification or relegation
1	Donmuang Police Station (drew in 1st position)	2	1	1	0	5	2	+3	4	Qualification to Third round
2	Ratchadamnoen Commercial School (drew in 2nd position)	2	1	1	0	5	3	+2	4	Qualification to Second round
3	Jim Thompson Farm	2	0	0	2	1	6	−5	0	

Updated to match(es) played on unknown. Source: Thai Division 3
Rules for classification: 1) points; 2) goal difference; 3) number of goals scored.

7 January 2017	Ratchadamnoen Commercial School	2 – 2	Donmuang Police Station	Bangkok
13:00 (UTC+7)				Stadium: Nong Chok National Football Center 2

9 January 2017	Donmuang Police Station	3 – 0	Jim Thompson Farm	Bangkok
10:00 (UTC+7)				Stadium: Nong Chok National Football Center 3

11 January 2017	Jim Thompson Farm	1 – 3	Ratchadamnoen Commercial School	Bangkok
15:00 (UTC+7)				Stadium: Nong Chok National Football Center 3

=== Group F ===
Pos	Team	Pld	W	D	L	GF	GA	GD	Pts	Qualification or relegation
1	Vongchavalitkul University	2	2	0	0	9	0	+9	6	Qualification to Third round
2	Dhurakij Pundit University	2	1	0	1	1	5	−4	3	Qualification to Second round
3	Samutsakhonwittayalai School	2	0	0	2	0	5	−5	0	

Updated to match(es) played on unknown. Source: Thai Division 3
Rules for classification: 1) points; 2) goal difference; 3) number of goals scored.

7 January 2017	Vongchavalitkul University	5 – 0	Dhurakij Pundit University	Bangkok
15:00 (UTC+7)				Stadium: Nong Chok National Football Center 2

9 January 2017	Dhurakij Pundit University	1 – 0	Samutsakhonwittayalai School	Bangkok
13:00 (UTC+7)				Stadium: Nong Chok National Football Center 3

12 January 2017	Samutsakhonwittayalai School	0 – 4	Vongchavalitkul University	Bangkok
10:00 (UTC+7)				Stadium: Nong Chok National Football Center 1

=== Group G ===
Pos	Team	Pld	W	D	L	GF	GA	GD	Pts	Qualification or relegation
1	Playmaker United	2	2	0	0	5	1	+4	6	Qualification to Third round
2	Traill International school	2	1	0	1	1	5	−4	3	Qualification to Second round
3	Angthong United (withdrew)	2	0	0	2	0	0	0	0	

Updated to match(es) played on unknown. Source: Thai Division 3
Rules for classification: 1) points; 2) goal difference; 3) number of goals scored.

7 January 2017	Traill International school	w/o	Angthong United	Bangkok
10:00 (UTC+7)				Stadium: Nong Chok National Football Center 3

9 January 2017	Angthong United	w/o	Playmaker United	Bangkok
15:00 (UTC+7)				Stadium: Nong Chok National Football Center 3

12 January 2017	Playmaker United	5 – 1	Traill International school	Bangkok
13:00 (UTC+7)				Stadium: Nong Chok National Football Center 1

=== Group H ===
Pos	Team	Pld	W	D	L	GF	GA	GD	Pts	Qualification or relegation
1	Therdthai Diamond	2	2	0	0	7	4	+3	6	Qualification to Third round
2	Naval Medical Department	2	1	0	1	7	5	+2	3	Qualification to Second round
3	Wat Suthiwararam Alumni Association	2	0	0	2	3	8	−5	0	

Updated to match(es) played on unknown. Source: Thai Division 3
Rules for classification: 1) points; 2) goal difference; 3) number of goals scored.

7 January 2017	Therdthai Diamond	3 – 2	Wat Suthiwararam Alumni Association	Bangkok
13:00 (UTC+7)				Stadium: Nong Chok National Football Center 3

10 January 2017	Wat Suthiwararam Alumni Association	1 – 5	Naval Medical Department	Bangkok
10:00 (UTC+7)				Stadium: Nong Chok National Football Center 1

12 January 2017	Naval Medical Department	2 – 4	Therdthai Diamond	Bangkok
15:00 (UTC+7)				Stadium: Nong Chok National Football Center 1

=== Group I ===
Pos	Team	Pld	W	D	L	GF	GA	GD	Pts	Qualification or relegation
1	Sing Ubon	2	2	0	0	8	1	+7	6	Qualification to Third round
2	New Bridge Thonglor	2	1	0	1	2	5	−3	3	Qualification to Third round
3	Debsirin Alumni Association	2	0	0	2	1	5	−4	0	

Updated to match(es) played on unknown. Source: Thai Division 3
Rules for classification: 1) points; 2) goal difference; 3) number of goals scored.

7 January 2017	Sing Ubon	3 – 1	Debsirin Alumni Association	Bangkok
15:00 (UTC+7)				Stadium: Nong Chok National Football Center 3

10 January 2017	Debsirin Alumni Association	0 – 2	New Bridge Thonglor	Bangkok
13:00 (UTC+7)				Stadium: Nong Chok National Football Center 1

12 January 2017	New Bridge Thonglor	0 – 5	Sing Ubon	Bangkok
10:00 (UTC+7)				Stadium: Nong Chok National Football Center 2

=== Group J ===
Pos	Team	Pld	W	D	L	GF	GA	GD	Pts	Qualification or relegation
1	Dontan PCCM	2	1	1	0	4	1	+3	4	Qualification to Third round
2	Yingcharoen	2	1	0	1	1	3	−2	3	Qualification to Third round
3	King Mongkut's University of Technology North Bangkok	2	0	1	1	1	2	−1	1	

Updated to match(es) played on unknown. Source: Thai Division 3
Rules for classification: 1) points; 2) goal difference; 3) number of goals scored.

8 January 2017	Yingcharoen	1 – 0	King Mongkut's University of Technology North Bangkok	Bangkok
10:00 (UTC+7)				Stadium: Nong Chok National Football Center 1

10 January 2017	King Mongkut's University of Technology North Bangkok	1 – 1	Dontan PCCM	Bangkok
15:00 (UTC+7)				Stadium: Nong Chok National Football Center 1

12 January 2017	Dontan PCCM	3 – 0	Yingcharoen	Bangkok
13:00 (UTC+7)				Stadium: Nong Chok National Football Center 2

=== Group K ===
Pos	Team	Pld	W	D	L	GF	GA	GD	Pts	Qualification or relegation
1	Chandrakasem Rajabhat University	2	2	0	0	8	2	+6	6	Qualification to Third round
2	Royal Thai Air Force Welfare Department	2	1	0	1	5	4	+1	3	Qualification to Third round
3	KrungKao	2	0	0	2	3	10	−7	0	

Updated to match(es) played on unknown. Source: Thai Division 3
Rules for classification: 1) points; 2) goal difference; 3) number of goals scored.

8 January 2017	Chandrakasem Rajabhat University	3 – 0	Royal Thai Air Force Welfare Department	Bangkok
13:00 (UTC+7)				Stadium: Nong Chok National Football Center 1

10 January 2017	Royal Thai Air Force Welfare Department	5 – 1	KrungKao	Bangkok
10:00 (UTC+7)				Stadium: Nong Chok National Football Center 2

12 January 2017	KrungKao	2 – 5	Chandrakasem Rajabhat University	Bangkok
15:00 (UTC+7)				Stadium: Nong Chok National Football Center 2

=== Group L ===
Pos	Team	Pld	W	D	L	GF	GA	GD	Pts	Qualification or relegation
1	Bang Pa-In School (drew in 1st position)	2	1	1	0	7	2	+5	4	Qualification to Third round
2	Royal Thai Air Force Academy (drew in 2nd position)	2	1	1	0	5	2	+3	4	Qualification to Third round
3	Bangplub	2	0	0	2	2	10	−8	0	

Updated to match(es) played on unknown. Source: Thai Division 3
Rules for classification: 1) points; 2) goal difference; 3) number of goals scored.

8 January 2017	Bang Pa-In School	1 – 1	Royal Thai Air Force Academy	Bangkok
15:00 (UTC+7)				Stadium: Nong Chok National Football Center 1

10 January 2017	Royal Thai Air Force Academy	4 – 1	Bangplub	Bangkok
13:00 (UTC+7)				Stadium: Nong Chok National Football Center 2

12 January 2017	Bangplub	1 – 6	Bang Pa-In School	Bangkok
10:00 (UTC+7)				Stadium: Nong Chok National Football Center 3

=== Group M ===
Pos	Team	Pld	W	D	L	GF	GA	GD	Pts	Qualification or relegation
1	Bansomdejchaopraya Rajabhat University	2	2	0	0	9	5	+4	6	Qualification to Third round
2	Tanmananusorn Foundation	2	1	0	1	4	4	0	3	Qualification to Third round
3	Singburi United	2	0	0	2	4	8	−4	0	

Updated to match(es) played on unknown. Source: Thai Division 3
Rules for classification: 1) points; 2) goal difference; 3) number of goals scored.

8 January 2017	Singburi United	4 – 5	Bansomdejchaopraya Rajabhat University	Bangkok
10:00 (UTC+7)				Stadium: Nong Chok National Football Center 2

10 January 2017	Bansomdejchaopraya Rajabhat University	4 – 1	Tanmananusorn Foundation	Bangkok
15:00 (UTC+7)				Stadium: Nong Chok National Football Center 2

12 January 2017	Tanmananusorn Foundation	3 – 0	Singburi United	Bangkok
13:00 (UTC+7)				Stadium: Nong Chok National Football Center 3

=== Group N ===
Pos	Team	Pld	W	D	L	GF	GA	GD	Pts	Qualification or relegation
1	Pichaya Kasem Technological College (drew in 1st position)	2	1	0	1	8	3	+5	3	Qualification to Third round
2	Mahanakorn (drew in 2nd position)	2	1	0	1	3	7	−4	3	Qualification to Third round
3	Ramkhamhaeng University (drew in 3rd position)	2	1	0	1	2	3	−1	3	

Updated to match(es) played on unknown. Source: Thai Division 3
Rules for classification: 1) points; 2) goal difference; 3) number of goals scored.

8 January 2017	Ramkhamhaeng University	2 – 1	Pichaya Kasem Technological College	Bangkok
13:00 (UTC+7)				Stadium: Nong Chok National Football Center 2

10 January 2017	Pichaya Kasem Technological College	7 – 1	Mahanakorn	Bangkok
10:00 (UTC+7)				Stadium: Nong Chok National Football Center 3

12 January 2017	Mahanakorn	2 – 0	Ramkhamhaeng University	Bangkok
15:00 (UTC+7)				Stadium: Nong Chok National Football Center 3

=== Group O ===
Pos	Team	Pld	W	D	L	GF	GA	GD	Pts	Qualification or relegation
1	Petchchaiyapruek	2	1	1	0	6	3	+3	4	Qualification to Third round
2	Nakornpathom Rajabhat University	2	1	0	1	6	3	+3	3	Qualification to Third round
3	Forester	2	0	1	1	3	9	−6	1	

Updated to match(es) played on unknown. Source: Thai Division 3
Rules for classification: 1) points; 2) goal difference; 3) number of goals scored.

8 January 2017	Nakornpathom Rajabhat University	6 – 0	Forester	Bangkok
15:00 (UTC+7)				Stadium: Nong Chok National Football Center 2

10 January 2017	Forester	3 – 3	Petchchaiyapruek	Bangkok
13:00 (UTC+7)				Stadium: Nong Chok National Football Center 3

13 January 2017	Petchchaiyapruek	3 – 0	Nakornpathom Rajabhat University	Bangkok
15:00 (UTC+7)				Stadium: Nong Chok National Football Center 1

=== Group P ===
Pos	Team	Pld	W	D	L	GF	GA	GD	Pts	Qualification or relegation
1	Kasetsart University Kamphaeng Saen Campus	2	2	0	0	4	2	+2	6	Qualification to Third round
2	Uthenthawai	2	1	0	1	3	3	0	3	Qualification to Third round
3	Lumplee Subdistrict Municipality	2	0	0	2	4	6	−2	0	

Updated to match(es) played on unknown. Source: Thai Division 3
Rules for classification: 1) points; 2) goal difference; 3) number of goals scored.

8 January 2017	Uthenthawai	3 – 2	Lumplee Subdistrict Municipality	Bangkok
10:00 (UTC+7)				Stadium: Nong Chok National Football Center 3

10 January 2017	Lumplee Subdistrict Municipality	2 – 3	Kasetsart University Kamphaeng Saen Campus	Bangkok
15:00 (UTC+7)				Stadium: Nong Chok National Football Center 3

13 January 2017	Kasetsart University Kamphaeng Saen Campus	1 – 0	Uthenthawai	Bangkok
15:00 (UTC+7)				Stadium: Nong Chok National Football Center 1

=== Group Q ===
Pos	Team	Pld	W	D	L	GF	GA	GD	Pts	Qualification or relegation
1	SWU United	3	2	1	0	9	5	+4	7	Qualification to Third round
2	Wat Suthiwararam School (drew in 2nd position)	3	1	1	1	5	6	−1	4	Qualification to Third round
3	Phon Commercial and Technical College (drew in 3rd position)	3	1	1	1	5	1	+4	4	
4	Wangpailom SC	3	0	1	2	3	10	−7	1	

Updated to match(es) played on unknown. Source: Thai Division 3
Rules for classification: 1) points; 2) goal difference; 3) number of goals scored.

8 January 2017	Phon Commercial and Technical College	4 – 0	Wangpailom Sport Club	Bangkok
13:00 (UTC+7)				Stadium: Nong Chok National Football Center 3

8 January 2017	SWU United	5 – 3	Wat Suthiwararam School	Bangkok
15:00 (UTC+7)				Stadium: Nong Chok National Football Center 3

11 January 2017	Phon Commercial and Technical College	0 – 0	SWU United	Bangkok
10:00 (UTC+7)				Stadium: Nong Chok National Football Center 1

11 January 2017	Wangpailom Sport Club	1 – 1	Wat Suthiwararam School	Bangkok
13:00 (UTC+7)				Stadium: Nong Chok National Football Center 1

13 January 2017	Wangpailom Sport Club	4 – 2	SWU United	Bangkok
10:00 (UTC+7)				Stadium: Nong Chok National Football Center 1

13 January 2017	Wat Suthiwararam School	1 – 0	Phon Commercial and Technical College	Bangkok
10:00 (UTC+7)				Stadium: Nong Chok National Football Center 2

=== Group R ===
Pos	Team	Pld	W	D	L	GF	GA	GD	Pts	Qualification or relegation
1	Singburi Kopoon	3	3	0	0	12	1	+11	9	Qualification to Third round
2	Rajamangala University Of Technology Rattanakosin (drew in 2nd position)	3	1	1	1	3	5	−2	4	Qualification to Third round
3	Bangpla CCP (drew in 3rd position)	3	1	1	1	5	6	−1	4	
4	Ratchaburi NNK BPF United	3	0	0	3	1	9	−8	0	

Updated to match(es) played on unknown. Source: Thai Division 3
Rules for classification: 1) points; 2) goal difference; 3) number of goals scored.

9 January 2017	Ratchaburi NNK BPF United	0 – 4	Singburi Kopoon	Bangkok
10:00 (UTC+7)				Stadium: Nong Chok National Football Center 1

9 January 2017	Rajamangala University Of Technology Rattanakosin	1 – 1	Bangpla CCP	Bangkok
13:00 (UTC+7)				Stadium: Nong Chok National Football Center 1

11 January 2017	Ratchaburi NNK BPF United	1 – 2	Rajamangala University Of Technology Rattanakosin	Bangkok
15:00 (UTC+7)				Stadium: Nong Chok National Football Center 1

11 January 2017	Singburi Kopoon	5 – 1	Bangpla CCP	Bangkok
10:00 (UTC+7)				Stadium: Nong Chok National Football Center 2

13 January 2017	Singburi Kopoon	3 – 0	Rajamangala University Of Technology Rattanakosin	Bangkok
13:00 (UTC+7)				Stadium: Nong Chok National Football Center 1

13 January 2017	Bangpla CCP	3 – 0	Ratchaburi NNK BPF United	Bangkok
13:00 (UTC+7)				Stadium: Nong Chok National Football Center 2

=== Second round ===
14 January 2017	Ratchadamnoen Commercial School	1 – 0	Dhurakij Pundit University	Bangkok
13:00 (UTC+7)				Stadium: Nong Chok National Football Center 2

14 January 2017	Traill International school	2(4) – 2(6)	Naval Medical Department	Bangkok
15:00 (UTC+7)				Stadium: Nong Chok National Football Center 2

=== Third round ===
15 January 2017	Nongkhae	2 – 1	New Bridge Thonglor	Bangkok
13:00 (UTC+7)				Stadium: Nong Chok National Football Center 1

15 January 2017	Tan Diao TAO	4 – 2	Yingcharoen	Bangkok
15:00 (UTC+7)				Stadium: Nong Chok National Football Center 1

15 January 2017	Ayodhya City	3 – 1	Royal Thai Air Force Welfare Department	Bangkok
13:00 (UTC+7)				Stadium: Nong Chok National Football Center 2

15 January 2017	Laem Sing Fisheries Association	4 – 1	Royal Thai Air Force Academy	Bangkok
15:00 (UTC+7)				Stadium: Nong Chok National Football Center 2

16 January 2017	Donmuang Police Station	3 – 1	Tanmananusorn Foundation	Bangkok
13:00 (UTC+7)				Stadium: Nong Chok National Football Center 1

16 January 2017	Vongchavalitkul University	0(4) – 0(3)	Mahanakorn	Bangkok
15:00 (UTC+7)				Stadium: Nong Chok National Football Center 1

16 January 2017	Playmaker United	1 – 3	Nakornpathom Rajabhat University	Bangkok
13:00 (UTC+7)				Stadium: Nong Chok National Football Center 2

16 January 2017	Therdthai Diamond	1(4) – 1(3)	Uthenthawai	Bangkok
15:00 (UTC+7)				Stadium: Nong Chok National Football Center 2

17 January 2017	Sing Ubon	1 – 2	Wat Suthiwararam School	Bangkok
13:00 (UTC+7)				Stadium: Nong Chok National Football Center 1

17 January 2017	Dontan PCCM	1 – 0	Rajamangala University Of Technology Rattanakosin	Bangkok
15:00 (UTC+7)				Stadium: Nong Chok National Football Center 1

17 January 2017	Chandrakasem Rajabhat University	1(10) – 1(9)	Thonburi University	Bangkok
13:00 (UTC+7)				Stadium: Nong Chok National Football Center 2

17 January 2017	Bang Pa-In School	3 – 1	DHL All Stars	Bangkok
15:00 (UTC+7)				Stadium: Nong Chok National Football Center 2

18 January 2017	Bansomdejchaopraya Rajabhat University	2 – 0	Ratchadamnoen Commercial School	Bangkok
13:00 (UTC+7)				Stadium: Nong Chok National Football Center 1

18 January 2017	Pichaya Kasem Technological College	2 – 0	Naval Medical Department	Bangkok
15:00 (UTC+7)				Stadium: Nong Chok National Football Center 1

18 January 2017	Petchchaiyapruek	3(5) – 3(7)	SWU United	Bangkok
13:00 (UTC+7)				Stadium: Nong Chok National Football Center 2

18 January 2017	Kasetsart University Kamphaeng Saen Campus	0 – 5	Singburi Kopoon	Bangkok
15:00 (UTC+7)				Stadium: Nong Chok National Football Center 2

=== Fourth round ===
20 January 2017	Nongkhae	0 – 2	Singburi Kopoon	Bangkok
13:00 (UTC+7)				Stadium: Nong Chok National Football Center 1

20 January 2017	Tan Diao TAO	2 – 0	SWU United	Bangkok
15:00 (UTC+7)				Stadium: Nong Chok National Football Center 1

20 January 2017	Ayodhya City	0(4) – 0(5)	Pichaya Kasem Technological College	Bangkok
13:00 (UTC+7)				Stadium: Nong Chok National Football Center 2

20 January 2017	Laem Sing Fisheries Association	1 – 2	Bansomdejchaopraya Rajabhat University	Bangkok
15:00 (UTC+7)				Stadium: Nong Chok National Football Center 2

21 January 2017	Donmuang Police Station	1 – 2	Bang Pa-In School	Bangkok
13:00 (UTC+7)				Stadium: Nong Chok National Football Center 1

21 January 2017	Vongchavalitkul University	3 – 2	Chandrakasem Rajabhat University	Bangkok
15:00 (UTC+7)				Stadium: Nong Chok National Football Center 1

21 January 2017	Nakornpathom Rajabhat University	1(5) – 1(6)	Dontan PCCM	Bangkok
13:00 (UTC+7)				Stadium: Nong Chok National Football Center 2

21 January 2017	Therdthai Diamond	1 – 4	Wat Suthiwararam School	Bangkok
15:00 (UTC+7)				Stadium: Nong Chok National Football Center 2

=== Quarter-finals Round ===
23 January 2017	Singburi Kopoon	4 – 0	Bang Pa-In School	Bangkok
13:00 (UTC+7)				Stadium: Nong Chok National Football Center 1

23 January 2017	Tan Diao TAO	1 – 2	Vongchavalitkul University	Bangkok
15:00 (UTC+7)				Stadium: Nong Chok National Football Center 1

23 January 2017	Pichaya Kasem Technological College	1 – 0	Dontan PCCM	Bangkok
13:00 (UTC+7)				Stadium: Nong Chok National Football Center 2

23 January 2017	Bansomdejchaopraya Rajabhat University	1 – 4	Wat Suthiwararam School	Bangkok
15:00 (UTC+7)				Stadium: Nong Chok National Football Center 2

=== Semi-finals Round ===
25 January 2017	Singburi Kopoon	1 – 0	Pichaya Kasem Technological College	Bangkok
13:00 (UTC+7)				Stadium: Nong Chok National Football Center 1

25 January 2017	Vongchavalitkul University	2 – 0	Wat Suthiwararam School	Bangkok
13:00 (UTC+7)				Stadium: Nong Chok National Football Center 1

=== Final round ===
27 January 2017	Singburi Kopoon	1(4) – 1(3)	Vongchavalitkul University	Bangkok
13:00 (UTC+7)				Stadium: Nong Chok National Football Center 1

=== Winner ===
2016 Thai Division 3 Tournament Central Region

1st title

== Southern Region ==
=== Member clubs ===
Section	Club	province	Years
1	Muangkhon United	Nakhon Si Thammarat	2016
1	Sungaipadee	Narathiwat	2016
1	Surat Thani United	Surat Thani	2016
1	Newball Satun	Satun	2016

=== Venue Stadium and locations (2016) ===
All matches played in Wiang Sa District, Surat Thani

Coordinates	Location	Stadium	Capacity
8°39′43″N 99°22′31″E	Wiang Sa District, Surat Thani	Wiang Sa District Stadium (Wiang Sa Municipal Stadium)	?

=== Qualification format ===
All four teams played a one-legged round-robin match. The best two teams advanced to the final round, and the winner of the final round was promoted to 2017 Thai Division 2 League.

=== First round ===
Pos	Team	Pld	W	D	L	GF	GA	GD	Pts	Qualification or relegation
1	Surat Thani United (drew in 1st position)	3	0	3	0	3	3	0	3	Qualification to Final Round
2	Sungaipadee (drew in 2nd position)	3	0	3	0	1	1	0	3	Qualification to Final Round
3	Newball Satun (drew in 3rd position)	3	0	3	0	1	1	0	3	
4	Muangkhon United (drew in 4th position)	3	0	3	0	1	1	0	3	

Updated to match(es) played on unknown. Source: Thai Division 3
Rules for classification: 1) points; 2) goal difference; 3) number of goals scored.

23 December 2016	Sungaipadee	0 – 0	Newball Satun	Surat Thani
13:00 (UTC+7)				Stadium: Wiang Sa District Stadium

23 December 2016	Muangkhon United	1 – 1	Surat Thani United	Surat Thani
15:00 (UTC+7)				Stadium: Wiang Sa District Stadium

25 December 2016	Newball Satun	0 – 0	Muangkhon United	Surat Thani
13:00 (UTC+7)				Stadium: Wiang Sa District Stadium

25 December 2016	Sungaipadee	1 – 1	Surat Thani United	Surat Thani
15:00 (UTC+7)				Stadium: Wiang Sa District Stadium

27 December 2016	Sungaipadee	0 – 0	Muangkhon United	Surat Thani
13:00 (UTC+7)				Stadium: Wiang Sa District Stadium

27 December 2016	Newball Satun	1 – 1	Surat Thani United	Surat Thani
15:00 (UTC+7)				Stadium: Wiang Sa District Stadium

=== Final round ===
29 December 2016	Surat Thani United	1(5) – 1(4)	Sungaipadee	Surat Thani
15:30 (UTC+7)				Stadium: Wiang Sa District Stadium

=== Winner ===
2016 Thai Division 3 Tournament Southern Region

1st title

== Champions list ==
Promoted to 2017 Thai League 4

Regional	Winner
Northern	Changphueak Chiang Mai
North Eastern	Wang Saphung
Eastern	Bankhai United
Central	Singburi Kopoon
Southern	Surat Thani United

== See also ==
- 2016 Thai League
- 2016 Thai Division 1 League
- 2016 Regional League Division 2
- 2016 Thai Division 3 Tournament Northern Region
- 2016 Thai Division 3 Tournament North Eastern Region
- 2016 Thai Division 3 Tournament Central Region
- 2016 Thai Division 3 Tournament Eastern Region
- 2016 Thai Division 3 Tournament Southern Region
- 2016 Thai FA Cup
- 2016 Thai League Cup
- 2016 Kor Royal Cup
