= Muang Loei United F.C. =

Thai football club

Muang Loei United เมืองเลย ยูไนเต็ด
- Full name: Muang Loei United Football Club สโมสรฟุตบอลเมืองเลย ยูไนเต็ด
- Nicknames: The Se-Lai Warriors (นักรบเซไล)
- Founded: 2012; 14 years ago (as Wang Saphung Municipality); 2016; 10 years ago (as Muang Loei United)
- Ground: Blue Dragon Muang Loei Stadium; Loei, Thailand
- Chairman: Lertsak Patthanachaikul
- Head coach: Tana Chanabut
- League: Thai League 2
- 2025–26: Thai League 3, 1st of 12 in the Northeastern region (readmitted)
Home colours	Away colours

Muang Loei United Football Club (Thai สโมสรฟุตบอลเมืองเลย ยูไนเต็ด), is a Thai football club based in Mueang, Loei, Thailand. The club was the champion in the 2016 Football Division 3 of North Eastern Region and was promoted to Thai League 4 North Eastern Region. The club was formed in 2012 and entered the Thai Football Division 3 in 2016. The club was renamed from Wang Saphung Football Club. The club is currently playing in the Thai League 3 Northeastern region.

== History ==
In 2022, Muang Loei United competed in the Thai League 3 for the 2022–23 season. It is their 6th season in the professional league. The club started the season with a 1–1 away draw with Mahasarakham SBT and they ended the season with a 3–1 home win over Sakon Nakhon. The club has finished 6th place in the league of the Northeastern region. In addition, in the 2022–23 Thai FA Cup Muang Loei United was penalty shoot-out defeated 4–5 by Banbueng in the first round, causing them to be eliminated and in the 2022–23 Thai League Cup Muang Loei United was defeated 1–2 by Sisaket United in the first qualification round, causing them to be eliminated too.

== Stadium and locations ==
Coordinates	Location	Stadium	Year
17°18′22″N 101°46′13″E	Wang Saphung, Loei	Wang Saphung Stadium	2017–2019
17°29′09″N 101°44′06″E	Mueang, Loei	Loei Provincial Stadium	2020
17°30′50″N 101°43′11″E	Mueang, Loei	Blue Dragon Muang Loei Stadium	2021–

== Records ==
=== Matches ===
- First match
  - vs. Petchchaiyapruek F.C., Drew 0–0, Ngor Royal Cup, Nong Chok Sport Stadium, 20 January 2015
- First League Match
  - vs. Mashare Chaiyaphum F.C., Lost 0–1, Thai League 4, Wang Saphung Stadium (H), 12 February 2017
- First Thai League Cup Match
  - vs. Uttaradit F.C., Win 2–0, Wang Saphung Stadium (H), 1 March 2017
- Record win (all competitions)
  - 7–0 (against Mashare Chaiyaphum F.C., 2021–22 Thai League 3 Northeastern Region, Muang Loei Stadium (H), 16 February 2022)
- Record League win
  - 7–0 (against Mashare Chaiyaphum F.C., 2021–22 Thai League 3 Northeastern Region, Muang Loei Stadium (H), 16 February 2022)
- Record defeat (all competitions)
  - 0–7 (against Chachoengsao Hi-Tek F.C., 2020–21 Thai League 3 National Championship, Chachoengsao Town Municipality Stadium, 6 March 2021)
- Record League defeat
  - 0–7 (against Chachoengsao Hi-Tek F.C., 2020–21 Thai League 3 National Championship, Chachoengsao Town Municipality Stadium, 6 March 2021)

=== Attendance ===
- Highest home attendance
  - 1,052 vs. Bangkok United F.C., 2019 Thai League Cup, 3 July 2019
- Lowest home attendance
  - 39 vs. Rasisalai United F.C., 2022–23 Thai League 3 Northeastern Region, 15 February 2023

=== Player records ===
- Most goals in all competitions
  - 26, by Chawin Thirawatsri (Thailand) , during 2018–2019 season)
- First player to score a League goal
  - Miguel Kamwa Ngueyu (Cameroon) : vs. Buriram United F.C. B, Thai League 4, 26 February 2017, Wang Saphung Stadium
- Most goal scored in a match: 4
  - Danusorn Wijitpanya (Thailand) v Sakon Nakhon F.C., Thai League 4, 1 September 2019, Sakon Nakhon City municipality Stadium
  - Célio Guilherme da Silva Santos (Brazil) v Sisaket United F.C., 2020 Thai League Cup, 22 February 2020, Sri Nakhon Lamduan Stadium

== Season by season record ==
Season	League									FA Cup	League Cup	T3 Cup	Top goalscorer	
Season	Division	P	W	D	L	F	A	Pts	Pos	FA Cup	League Cup	T3 Cup	Name	Goals
2016	DIV 3 Northeast	5	3	1	1	16	7	10	1st	Opted out	Ineligible		(Thailand) Niyom Boonprom	3
2017	T4 Northeast	33	14	12	7	46	30	54	3rd	R1	QR2		(Madagascar) Dimitri Carlos Zozimar	6
2018	T4 Northeast	26	17	6	3	50	22	57	1st	R1	QR2		(Thailand) Chawin Thirawatsri	17
2019	T4 Northeast	24	17	4	3	55	15	55	1st	R1	R2		(Thailand) Wittaya Thanawatcharasanti	13
2020–21	T3 Northeast	15	12	1	2	35	9	37	2nd	R3	QR2		(Ivory Coast) Diarra Junior Aboubacar	14
2021–22	T3 Northeast	24	18	4	2	59	15	58	1st	R2	R2		(Thailand) Amporn Chaipong	12
2022–23	T3 Northeast	24	9	9	6	38	28	36	6th	R1	QR1		(Mali) Ibrahim Konaré	9
2023–24	T3 Northeast	24	11	6	7	43	33	39	7th	QR	Opted out	QR2	(Thailand) Apidet Janngam	9
2024–25	T3 Northeast	20	6	8	6	22	22	26	5th	R2	QR2	R16	(Nigeria) Michael Aliu	7
2025–26	T3 Northeast	22	14	7	1	49	21	49	1st	QR	QR1	LP	(Thailand) Sihanart Sutisuk	14
2026–27	T2													

Champions	Runners-up	Promoted	Relegated

- P = Played
- W = Games won
- D = Games drawn
- L = Games lost
- F = Goals for
- A = Goals against
- Pts = Points
- Pos = Final position
- DQ = Disqualified
- QR1 = First Qualifying Round
- QR2 = Second Qualifying Round
- QR3 = Third Qualifying Round
- QR4 = Fourth Qualifying Round
- RInt = Intermediate Round
- R1 = Round 1
- R2 = Round 2
- R3 = Round 3
- R4 = Round 4
- R5 = Round 5
- R6 = Round 6
- GR = Group stage
- QF = Quarter-finals
- SF = Semi-finals
- RU = Runners-up
- S = Shared
- W = Winners

== Players ==
=== Current squad ===
As of 1 August 2026

Note: Flags indicate national team as defined under FIFA eligibility rules; some limited exceptions apply. Players may hold more than one non-FIFA nationality.

No.	Pos.	Nation	Player
4	MF	THA	Worawut Namvech
7	FW	KOR	Lee Seung-won
8	MF	THA	Nopphon Ponkam
9	FW	JPN	Talla Ndao
10	FW	THA	Tana Chanabut
13	DF	THA	Chanchai Phonchamroen
14	FW	THA	Winiton Duangchai
16	DF	THA	Jansada Kanha
19	FW	THA	Thapkhon Markmee
20	MF	THA	Peeravit Kidrob
21	DF	THA	Teerapat Kessopa

No.	Pos.	Nation	Player
23	DF	THA	Taveechai Kliangklao
24	MF	THA	Chaiwat Ritthisak
28	FW	BRA	Ruan Quadros
29	FW	THA	Kitsana Chitchuea
35	GK	THA	Pairot Eiammak
37	MF	THA	Thanakrit Banjongkaew
41	DF	BRA	Thiago Duchatsch
47	MF	THA	Nonthawat Chaotai
59	DF	THA	Wirachai Buyairaksa
71	DF	THA	Eakkaluk Lungnam
88	FW	THA	Amporn Chaipong
99	GK	THA	Thanarat Neao-olo

=== Out on loan ===
Note: Flags indicate national team as defined under FIFA eligibility rules; some limited exceptions apply. Players may hold more than one non-FIFA nationality.

No.	Pos.	Nation	Player
—	FW	THA	Tanapat Waempracha (at Nongbua Pitchaya)

== Honours ==
=== Domestic leagues ===
- Thai League 3 North Eastern Region
  - Winners (2): 2021–22, 2025–26
- Thai League 4 North Eastern Region
  - Winners (2): 2018, 2019
- Football Division 3
  - Winners (1): 2016
