= Pak Chong City F.C. =

Thai football club

Pak Chong City ปากช่องซิตี้
- Full name: Pak Chong City Football Club ปากช่องซิตี้
- Founded: 2014; 12 years ago
- Ground: Kong Wak Seen field Nakhon Ratchasima, Thailand
- Chairman: Kittisak Silpiasue
- Coach: Sayan Nicharum
- League: 2018 Thailand Amateur League Eastern Region
Home colours	Away colours

Pak Chong City Football Club (Thai ปากช่องซิตี้), or Pakchong School Alumni Association F.C. is a Thai semi-professional Football Club based in Pak Chong District in Nakhon Ratchasima, Thailand. The club is currently playing in the 2018 Thailand Amateur League Eastern Region.

== Record ==
Season	League									FA Cup	League Cup	Top goalscorer	
Season	Division	P	W	D	L	F	A	Pts	Pos	FA Cup	League Cup	Name	Goals
2011	Ngor Royal Cup	7						–	Runners-up	–	–		
2014	Khor Royal Cup	7	4	3	0	14	6	–	Winner	–	–	Pornwichian Thanwong	6
2015	Khǒr Royal Cup	6	2	3	1	8	8	–	Semi-final	–	–		
2016	DIV 3 East	4	2	0	2	7	5	6	5th – 8th	Not Enter	Can't Enter		
2017	TA North-East	6	2	2	2	9	7	8	9th – 10th	Not Enter	Can't Enter		
2018	TA East	4	2	1	1	13	7	7	6th	Not Enter	Can't Enter	Korkiat Janpitak	3

Champions	Runners-up	Promoted	Relegated
