= Ngor Royal Cup =

- Organising body: Football Association of Thailand
- Founded: 1963
- Folded: 2015
- Country: Thailand
- Domestic cup(s): Thai FA Cup

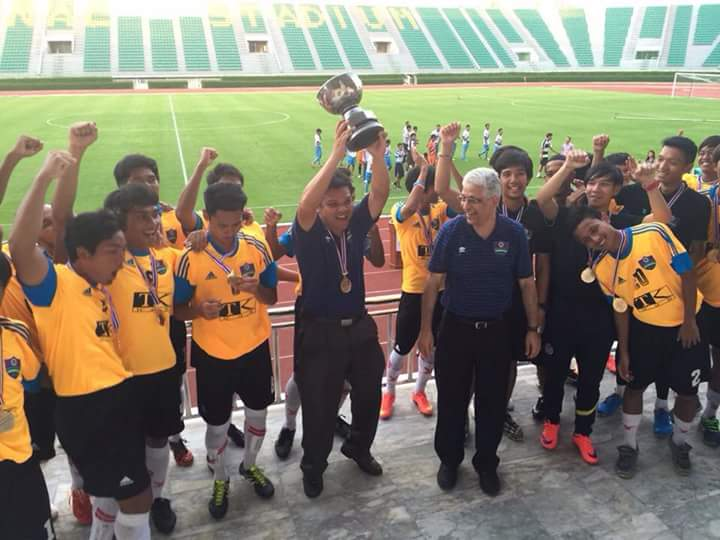
Mahidol University Sport Science F.C., the 2016 Ngor Royal Cup winner

Ngor Royal Cup (Thai: ถ้วยพระราชทาน ง.; ถ้วย ง.) is the lowest level of club football competition which competed in the tournament in Thailand since 1963. It was founded by Football Association of Thailand along with Khor Royal Cup in 1963. Locomotive Club - Health Department was the first team to win this competition.

In 1996, Ngor Royal Cup was downgraded to be the fifth-tier football tournament of Thai club football competition when Football Association of Thailand founded Thai Division 1 League as the second-tier in its place. Finally, in 2006, the tournament was downgraded to be the sixth-tier tournament due to the proposed merger of the Provincial League and Thai Premier League into one entity.

In 2016, Ngor Royal Cup was combined to Regional League Division 3 completely along with Khǒr Royal Cup and Khor Royal Cup by Football Association of Thailand and then Ngor Royal Cup become a trophy for Thai Football Division 3.

== Tournament format ==
As it is the lowest division of Thai football, the clubs which are still in the division, and new ones which participate in the tournament by sending applications to the Football Association of Thailand, will take part of the tournament. The first round is the group stage, played in a round-robin basis, and the clubs are divided into groups of 3 or 4. The winners and the runners-up of each group qualify to the knock-out stage. Only the best eight, or the quarter-finalist clubs, of the tournament promote to the Khor Royal Cup next season, while there's no relegation and the remaining clubs are still in this division until they can reach the quarter-final round or promotional spots.

== List of winners ==
Year	Champion	Result	Runner-up	Promoted clubs
2015	Mahidol University Sport Science	3-3 (4-3)p	Institute of Physical Education Chonburi Campus	Civil Protection Association^{1} Kasem Pitthaya School^{1} Forestry Alumni^{2} Naval Medical Department^{2} Thammanusorn Foundation^{2} Patthana F.C.^{2}
2014-15	Nakhon Pathom Municipality Sport School	3-0	Wang Sapung Municipality	Nongkhae Municipality^{1} Samut Sakhon Witthayalai School^{1} Ban Krua School^{2} Esan Pattaya^{2} Play-maker United^{2} Wangman Tambon Authority Organization^{2}
2013-14	Vongchavalitkul University Alumni Association	2-1	Chiang Rai Wonders	Sanamchand United^{1} Wangphailom Sport^{1} Institute of Physical Education Chiang Mai Campus^{2} Royal Irrigation Department^{2} Therdthai Diamond^{2} T.W.D. United^{2}
2012-13	Nakhon Pathom Rajabhat University	3-1	Khao Baisri Municipality	Pichayakasem Technological College^{1} Wat Pa Ked School^{1} Institute of Physical Education Samut Sakhon Campus^{2} King Mongkut's University of Technology North Bangkok^{2} Ruam Namjai Foundation^{2} Wat Nongjorg School Alumni Association^{2}
2010-11	Pattaya Municipality	1-1 (5-4)p	Bang Pakong Sport Association	Bang Muang Municipality Amphawan Witthayalai School Don Muang Alumni Association Sriracha District Locomotive Club Institute of Physical Education Maha Sarakham Campus
2008-09	Krirk University	2-1	Wat Sutthiwararam Alumni Association	Vongchavalitkul University Alumni Association^{1} Fisheries Association of Laem Singh District^{1} Korat A.F.C.^{2} Amnat Charoen Alumni Association^{2} Pithakkan Foundation^{2} Lumplee Tambon Authority Organization^{2}
2007-08	Kukot Municipality	1-0	Bangkok Glass Sport Association	Physical Education Alumni Association^{1} Amnuaysil Alumni Association^{1} Bhumindhara Witthaya^{2} King Petch Club^{2} Thammanusorn Foundation^{2} Southeast Bangkok^{2}
2006	Baan Thung Ket School			
2005	Don Muang Samphan Club			
2004				
2003				
2002	Prachin Ratsadon-amrung School Alumni Association			
2001	Thepsatri Rajabhat University Lopburi		Thai Honda	
2000	Institute of P.E. Suphanburi Campus			
1999	Army Welfare Department			
1998	Customs Department			
1997	Bangkok Christian College			
1996	Air Technical Training School			
1995	Union Bank			
1994	Thai Military Bank			
1993	Royal Thai Army			
1992	Thai Tobacco Monopoly			
1991	Royal Thai Army			
1990	Bangkok Bank of Commerce			Bangkok University
1989	Royal Thai Army			
1988	Royal Thai Air Force			
1987	Royal Thai Army			
1986	Royal Thai Air Force			
1985	Bangkok Broadcasting Television Channel 7			
1984	Royal Thai Air Force			
1983	Waiyapokhi Foundation			
1982	Teacher's college Nakhon Pathom Campus			
1981	Royal Turf Club of Thailand			
1980	Royal Turf Club of Thailand - Boon Rawd Brewery Company Trade Union			
1979	Teacher's college Nakhon Pathom Campus			
1978	Trat F.C.			
1976	Bangkok Bank			
1975	Royal Turf Club of Thailand			
1974	Royal Thai Navy			
1973	Royal Thai Air Force - Air Technical Training School			
1972	Royal Irrigation Authority School			
1971	Bangkok Bank - Port Authority of Thailand			
1970	Bangkok Bank			
1969	Port Authority of Thailand			
1968	Port Authority of Thailand			
1967	Port Authority of Thailand			
1966	Royal Thai Air Force			
1965	Royal Thai Air Force - Locomotive Club			
1964	Royal Thai Army			
1963	Health Department			
1962	Locomotive Club - Health Department			

Note:

1. Eliminated in the semi-final round.
2. Eliminated in the quarter-final round.
