= Singburi United F.C. =

Thai football club

Singburi United สิงห์บุรี ยูไนเต็ด
- Full name: Singburi United Football Club สิงห์บุรี ยูไนเต็ด
- Founded: 2016; 9 years ago
- Ground: ? Singburi, Thailand
- League: 2016 Thai Division 3 League Central Region

Singburi United Football Club (Thai สิงห์บุรี ยูไนเต็ด), is a Thai football club based in Singburi province, Thailand. The club is currently playing in the Thai Football Division 3.

== Record ==
Season	League									FA Cup	League Cup	Top goalscorer	
Season	Division	P	W	D	L	F	A	Pts	Pos	FA Cup	League Cup	Name	Goals
2016	DIV 3 Central												

Champions	Runners-up	Promoted	Relegated
