= Thailand Amateur League =

Amateur football league

- Organising body: Football Association of Thailand
- Founded: 2017; 9 years ago
- Country: Thailand
- Confederation: AFC
- Number of clubs: Unlimited teams
- Level on pyramid: 5
- Domestic cup: Thai FA Cup
- Website: www.thaileague.co.th/ta

Thailand Amateur League (Thai: ไทยแลนด์ อเมเจอร์ลีก), commonly known as the TA, is the fifth level of Thai football organised by Thai League Co., Ltd. It was started in 2017 by an idea from Police General Somyot Poompanmoung, the president of Football Association of Thailand to improve all Thai Amateur clubs to be better and allowing other clubs which are in other regions chances to play in national FA tournament. In 2017, the tournament was divided into 12 regions and participated by 119 clubs which are former members Football Division 3, and debutants in the season. As the tournament is considered as the lowest level of Thai football, so the number of participants is unlimited as well as any club is able to send an application to participate in the tournament. In 2016, the Football Division 3 became a trophy for the Thailand Amateur League.

Since 2023, Thailand's league system has changed with the emergence of the Thailand Semi-pro League, a tier 4 league organized to find clubs promoted to Thai League 3. All amateur clubs can apply to compete in the Thailand Semi-pro League but must meet the club licensing standards of the Football Association of Thailand. For this reason, the Thailand Amateur League has been relegated to a non-league competition competing to maintain membership of amateur clubs that are not yet ready for club licensing.

== Champions history ==
=== Champions of the 4th tier Thai football league system (as Football Division 3) ===
#	Season	Number of teams	Winner of Northern Region	Winner of North Eastern Region	Winner of Eastern Region	Winner of Central Region	Winner of Southern Region
1	2016	104	Changphueak Chiang Mai	Muang Loei United	Bankhai United	Singburi Kopoon	Surat Thani United

=== Champions of the 5th tier Thai football league system (as Thailand Amateur League) ===
#	Season	Number of teams	Winner of Northern Region	Winner of North Eastern Region	Winner of Eastern Region	Winner of Central Region	Winner of Bangkok Metropolitan Region	Winner of Southern Region
2	2017	119	Nakhon Mae Sot United	Khong Chee Mool	Isan Pattaya	Chainat United	Air Force Robinson	Hatyai City
#	Season	Number of teams	Winner of Northern Region	Winner of North Eastern Region	Winner of Eastern Region	Winner of Western Region	Winner of Bangkok Metropolitan Region	Winner of Southern Region
3	2018	168	Maejo United	Khon Kaen Mordindang	Kohkwang	Saraburi United	Thonburi University	Muang Khon WU
4	2019	230	SA Pitsanulok	UD Nonghan	ACDC	Kanjanapat	Royal Thai Air Force	Songkhla
-	2020	Not held due to COVID-19 pandemic in Thailand.						

=== Champions of the 4th tier Thai football league system (as Thailand Amateur League) ===
#	Season	Number of teams	Winner of Northern Region	Winner of North Eastern Region	Winner of Eastern Region	Winner of Western Region	Winner of Bangkok Metropolitan Region	Winner of Southern Region
-	2021	Not held due to COVID-19 pandemic in Thailand.						
5	2022	253	Kongkrailas United	Rasisalai United	Fleet	Kanchanaburi City	Samut Sakhon City	Muang Trang United

=== Champions of the non-league competition (as Thailand Amateur League) ===
The Thailand Amateur League has been relegated to a non-league competition competing to maintain membership of amateur clubs that are not yet ready for club licensing.

#	Season	Number of teams	Winner of Northern Region	Winner of North Eastern Region	Winner of Eastern Region	Winner of Western Region	Winner of Bangkok Metropolitan Region	Winner of Southern Region
6	2023	138	Chattrakan City	Roi Et PB United	Royal Thai Fleet	Koksamrong FC	Romklao United	Satun

== See also ==
- Football records in Thailand
