= Sing Ubon F.C. =

Thai football club

Sing Ubon FC สิงห์อุบล เอฟซี
- Full name: Sing Ubon Football Club สโมสรฟุตบอลสิงห์อุบล
- Nickname: The Ubon Lion
- Founded: 2013; 12 years ago
- Ground: New Bridge field Bangkok, Thailand
- Capacity: –
- Chairman: Pennapa Kaewkongdee
- Manager: Chanakorn Singpia
- League: 2018 Thailand Amateur League Bangkok Metropolitan Region

Sing Ubon Football Club (Thai สโมสรฟุตบอลสิงห์อุบล), is a Thai Amateur football club based in Ubon Ratchathani. The club was formed in 2013 and entered the Ngor Royal Cup. Next seasons will move to Regional League Division 3. The club is currently playing in the 2018 Thailand Amateur League Bangkok Metropolitan Region.

== Seasonal record ==
Season	League									FA Cup	League Cup	Top goalscorer	
Season	Division	P	W	D	L	F	A	Pts	Pos	FA Cup	League Cup	Name	Goals
2015	Ngor Royal Cup									R1			
2016	DIV 3 Central	3	2	0	1	9	3	6	16th – 32nd	QR	Can't Enter		
2017	TA Bangkok	1	0	0	1	2	3	0	25th – 31st	QR	Can't Enter		
2018	TA Bangkok									R1	Can't Enter		

Champions	Runners-up	Third Place	Promoted	Relegated

- P = Played
- W = Games won
- D = Games drawn
- L = Games lost
- F = Goals for
- A = Goals against
- Pts = Points
- Pos = Final position
- QR1 = First Qualifying Round
- QR2 = Second Qualifying Round
- R1 = Round 1
- R2 = Round 2
- R3 = Round 3
- R4 = Round 4
- R5 = Round 5
- R6 = Round 6
- QF = Quarter-finals
- SF = Semi-finals
- RU = Runners-up
- W = Winners
