= 2016 Thai Division 3 Tournament Central Region =

2016 Thai Football Division 3 Tournament Central Region is the 1st season of the League competition since its establishment in 2016. It is in the fourth tier of the Thai football league system.

== Venue Stadium and locations (2016) ==
All matches played in Nong Chok National Football Center Nong Chok, Bangkok

Nong Chok, Bangkok	Nong Chok National Football Center is located in Thailand
Nong Chok National Football Center	Nong Chok National Football Center is located in Thailand
13.871805°N 100.847316°E	Nong Chok National Football Center is located in Thailand
Capacity: ?	Nong Chok National Football Center is located in Thailand

== Member clubs ==
Group	Club	Province	Years
1	Thonburi University	Bangkok	2016
1	Nongkhae	Nakhon Nayok	2016
1	Krirk University	Bangkok	2016
2	Tan Diao TAO	Saraburi	2016
2	Mahidol University Sport Science	Bangkok	2016
2	Air Technical Training School	Bangkok	2016
3	Metropolitan Electricity Authority	Bangkok	2016
3	Ayodhya City	Ayutthaya	2016
3	Klongluang Rockyrose	Pathum Thani	2016
4	DHL All Stars	Bangkok	2016
4	Laem Sing Fisheries Association	Chanthaburi	2016
4	Bang Mueang Municipality	Samut Prakan	2016
5	Ratchadamnoen Commercial School	Bangkok	2016
5	Donmuang Police Station	Bangkok	2016
5	Jim Thompson Farm	Nakhon Ratchasima	2016
6	Vongchavalitkul University	Nakhon Ratchasima	2016
6	Dhurakij Pundit University	Bangkok	2016
6	Samutsakhonwittayalai School	Samut Sakhon	2016
7	Traill International school	Bangkok	2016
7	Angthong United	Ang Thong	2016
7	Playmaker United	Bangkok	2016
8	Therdthai Diamond	Bangkok	2016
8	Wat Suthiwararam Alumni Association	Bangkok	2016
8	Naval Medical Department	Bangkok	2016
9	Sing Ubon	Ubon Ratchathani	2016
9	Debsirin Alumni Association	Bangkok	2016
9	New Bridge Thonglor	Bangkok	2016
10	Yingcharoen	Nonthaburi	2016
10	King Mongkut's University of Technology North Bangkok	Bangkok	2016
10	Dontan PCCM	Mukdahan	2016
11	Chandrakasem Rajabhat University	Bangkok	2016
11	Royal Thai Air Force Welfare Department	Bangkok	2016
11	KrungKao	Ayutthaya	2016
12	Bang Pa-In School	Ayutthaya	2016
12	Royal Thai Air Force Academy	Bangkok	2016
12	Bangplub	Nonthaburi	2016
13	Singburi United	Sing Buri	2016
13	Bansomdejchaopraya Rajabhat University	Bangkok	2016
13	Tanmananusorn Foundation	Bangkok	2016
14	Ramkhamhaeng University	Bangkok	2016
14	Pichaya Kasem Technological College	Bangkok	2016
14	Mahanakorn	Bangkok	2016
15	Nakornpathom Rajabhat University	Nakhon Pathom	2016
15	Forester	Bangkok	2016
15	Petchchaiyapruek	Bangkok	2016
16	Uthenthawai	Bangkok	2016
16	Lumplee Subdistrict Municipality	Ayutthaya	2016
16	Kasetsart University Kamphaeng Saen Campus	Nakhon Pathom	2016
17	Phon Commercial and Technical College	Khon Kaen	2016
17	Wangpailom SC	Bangkok	2016
17	SWU United	Bangkok	2016
17	Wat Suthiwararam School	Bangkok	2016
18	Ratchaburi NNK BPF United	Ratchaburi	2016
18	Singburi Kopoon	Singburi	2016
18	Rajamangala University Of Technology Rattanakosin	Bangkok	2016
18	Bangpla CCP	Samut Prakan	2016

== Format ==
Group stage: A total 54 clubs will be divided into four groups of three clubs except group 18 which has four clubs to play round-robin matches at a neutral venue. The best clubs of group A and G qualify to Quarter-finals round of the knock-out stage. The best clubs of group B, C, E, F, G and H, The best two clubs of group A, D, I, J, K, L, M, N, O, P, Q and R will qualify to third round of the knock-out stage. Runner-up of group E, F, G and H will qualify to second round of the knock-out stage.

Knock-out stage: A total of 18 clubs which has qualified from the group stage will play single-elimination stage until there are only two finalists of the tournament.

== First round ==
=== Group A ===
Pos	Team	Pld	W	D	L	GF	GA	GD	Pts	Qualification or relegation
1	Nongkhae	2	2	0	0	3	0	+3	6	Qualification to Third Round
2	Thonburi University	2	1	0	1	3	2	+1	3	Qualification to Third Round
3	Krirk University	2	0	0	2	0	4	−4	0	

Updated to match(es) played on unknown. Source: Thai Division 3
Rules for classification: 1) points; 2) goal difference; 3) number of goals scored.

7 January 2017	Thonburi University	0 - 2	Nongkhae	Bangkok
10:00 (UTC+7)				Stadium: Nong Chok National Football Center 1

9 January 2017	Nongkhae	1 - 0	Krirk University	Bangkok
15:00 (UTC+7)				Stadium: Nong Chok National Football Center 1

11 January 2017	Krirk University	0 - 3	Thonburi University	Bangkok
13:00 (UTC+7)				Stadium: Nong Chok National Football Center 2

=== Group B ===
Pos	Team	Pld	W	D	L	GF	GA	GD	Pts	Qualification or relegation
1	Tan Diao TAO (drew in 1st position)	2	1	1	0	3	1	+2	4	Qualification to Third Round
2	Mahidol University Sport Science (drew in 2nd position)	2	1	1	0	3	1	+2	4	
3	Air Technical Training School	2	0	0	2	0	4	−4	0	

Updated to match(es) played on unknown. Source: Thai Division 3
Rules for classification: 1) points; 2) goal difference; 3) number of goals scored.

7 January 2017	Tan Diao TAO	1 - 1	Mahidol University Sport Science	Bangkok
13:00 (UTC+7)				Stadium: Nong Chok National Football Center 1

9 January 2017	Mahidol University Sport Science	2 - 0	Air Technical Training School	Bangkok
10:00 (UTC+7)				Stadium: Nong Chok National Football Center 2

11 January 2017	Air Technical Training School	0 - 2	Tan Diao TAO	Bangkok
15:00 (UTC+7)				Stadium: Nong Chok National Football Center 2

=== Group C ===
Pos	Team	Pld	W	D	L	GF	GA	GD	Pts	Qualification or relegation
1	Ayodhya City	2	2	0	0	14	0	+14	6	Qualification to Third Round
2	Klongluang Rockyrose (drew in 2nd position)	2	0	1	1	2	12	−10	1	
3	Metropolitan Electricity Authority (drew in 3rd position)	2	0	1	1	2	6	−4	1	

Updated to match(es) played on unknown. Source: Thai Division 3
Rules for classification: 1) points; 2) goal difference; 3) number of goals scored.

7 January 2017	Metropolitan Electricity Authority	0 - 4	Ayodhya City	Bangkok
15:00 (UTC+7)				Stadium: Nong Chok National Football Center 1

9 January 2017	Ayodhya City	10 - 0	Klongluang Rockyrose	Bangkok
13:00 (UTC+7)				Stadium: Nong Chok National Football Center 2

11 January 2017	Klongluang Rockyrose	2 - 2	Metropolitan Electricity Authority	Bangkok
10:00 (UTC+7)				Stadium: Nong Chok National Football Center 3

=== Group D ===
Pos	Team	Pld	W	D	L	GF	GA	GD	Pts	Qualification or relegation
1	Laem Sing Fisheries Association	2	1	1	0	3	2	+1	4	Qualification to Third Round
2	DHL All Stars	2	1	0	1	5	2	+3	3	Qualification to Third Round
3	Bang Mueang Municipality	2	0	1	1	1	5	−4	1	

Updated to match(es) played on unknown. Source: Thai Division 3
Rules for classification: 1) points; 2) goal difference; 3) number of goals scored.

7 January 2017	DHL All Stars	1 - 2	Laem Sing Fisheries Association	Bangkok
10:00 (UTC+7)				Stadium: Nong Chok National Football Center 2

9 January 2017	Laem Sing Fisheries Association	1 - 1	Bang Mueang Municipality	Bangkok
15:00 (UTC+7)				Stadium: Nong Chok National Football Center 2

11 January 2017	Bang Mueang Municipality	0 - 4	DHL All Stars	Bangkok
13:00 (UTC+7)				Stadium: Nong Chok National Football Center 3

=== Group E ===
Pos	Team	Pld	W	D	L	GF	GA	GD	Pts	Qualification or relegation
1	Donmuang Police Station (drew in 1st position)	2	1	1	0	5	2	+3	4	Qualification to Third Round
2	Ratchadamnoen Commercial School (drew in 2nd position)	2	1	1	0	5	3	+2	4	Qualification to Second Round
3	Jim Thompson Farm	2	0	0	2	1	6	−5	0	

Updated to match(es) played on unknown. Source: Thai Division 3
Rules for classification: 1) points; 2) goal difference; 3) number of goals scored.

7 January 2017	Ratchadamnoen Commercial School	2 - 2	Donmuang Police Station	Bangkok
13:00 (UTC+7)				Stadium: Nong Chok National Football Center 2

9 January 2017	Donmuang Police Station	3 - 0	Jim Thompson Farm	Bangkok
10:00 (UTC+7)				Stadium: Nong Chok National Football Center 3

11 January 2017	Jim Thompson Farm	1 - 3	Ratchadamnoen Commercial School	Bangkok
15:00 (UTC+7)				Stadium: Nong Chok National Football Center 3

=== Group F ===
Pos	Team	Pld	W	D	L	GF	GA	GD	Pts	Qualification or relegation
1	Vongchavalitkul University	2	2	0	0	9	0	+9	6	Qualification to Third Round
2	Dhurakij Pundit University	2	1	0	1	1	5	−4	3	Qualification to Second Round
3	Samutsakhonwittayalai School	2	0	0	2	0	5	−5	0	

Updated to match(es) played on unknown. Source: Thai Division 3
Rules for classification: 1) points; 2) goal difference; 3) number of goals scored.

7 January 2017	Vongchavalitkul University	5 - 0	Dhurakij Pundit University	Bangkok
15:00 (UTC+7)				Stadium: Nong Chok National Football Center 2

9 January 2017	Dhurakij Pundit University	1 - 0	Samutsakhonwittayalai School	Bangkok
13:00 (UTC+7)				Stadium: Nong Chok National Football Center 3

12 January 2017	Samutsakhonwittayalai School	0 - 4	Vongchavalitkul University	Bangkok
10:00 (UTC+7)				Stadium: Nong Chok National Football Center 1

=== Group G ===
Pos	Team	Pld	W	D	L	GF	GA	GD	Pts	Qualification or relegation
1	Playmaker United	2	2	0	0	5	1	+4	6	Qualification to Third Round
2	Traill International school	2	1	0	1	1	5	−4	3	Qualification to Second Round
3	Angthong United (withdrew)	2	0	0	2	0	0	0	0	

Updated to match(es) played on unknown. Source: Thai Division 3
Rules for classification: 1) points; 2) goal difference; 3) number of goals scored.

7 January 2017	Traill International school	w/o	Angthong United	Bangkok
10:00 (UTC+7)				Stadium: Nong Chok National Football Center 3

9 January 2017	Angthong United	w/o	Playmaker United	Bangkok
15:00 (UTC+7)				Stadium: Nong Chok National Football Center 3

12 January 2017	Playmaker United	5 - 1	Traill International school	Bangkok
13:00 (UTC+7)				Stadium: Nong Chok National Football Center 1

=== Group H ===
Pos	Team	Pld	W	D	L	GF	GA	GD	Pts	Qualification or relegation
1	Therdthai Diamond	2	2	0	0	7	4	+3	6	Qualification to Third Round
2	Naval Medical Department	2	1	0	1	7	5	+2	3	Qualification to Second Round
3	Wat Suthiwararam Alumni Association	2	0	0	2	3	8	−5	0	

Updated to match(es) played on unknown. Source: Thai Division 3
Rules for classification: 1) points; 2) goal difference; 3) number of goals scored.

7 January 2017	Therdthai Diamond	3 - 2	Wat Suthiwararam Alumni Association	Bangkok
13:00 (UTC+7)				Stadium: Nong Chok National Football Center 3

10 January 2017	Wat Suthiwararam Alumni Association	1 - 5	Naval Medical Department	Bangkok
10:00 (UTC+7)				Stadium: Nong Chok National Football Center 1

12 January 2017	Naval Medical Department	2 - 4	Therdthai Diamond	Bangkok
15:00 (UTC+7)				Stadium: Nong Chok National Football Center 1

=== Group I ===
Pos	Team	Pld	W	D	L	GF	GA	GD	Pts	Qualification or relegation
1	Sing Ubon	2	2	0	0	8	1	+7	6	Qualification to Third Round
2	New Bridge Thonglor	2	1	0	1	2	5	−3	3	Qualification to Third Round
3	Debsirin Alumni Association	2	0	0	2	1	5	−4	0	

Updated to match(es) played on unknown. Source: Thai Division 3
Rules for classification: 1) points; 2) goal difference; 3) number of goals scored.

7 January 2017	Sing Ubon	3 - 1	Debsirin Alumni Association	Bangkok
15:00 (UTC+7)				Stadium: Nong Chok National Football Center 3

10 January 2017	Debsirin Alumni Association	0 - 2	New Bridge Thonglor	Bangkok
13:00 (UTC+7)				Stadium: Nong Chok National Football Center 1

12 January 2017	New Bridge Thonglor	0 - 5	Sing Ubon	Bangkok
10:00 (UTC+7)				Stadium: Nong Chok National Football Center 2

=== Group J ===
Pos	Team	Pld	W	D	L	GF	GA	GD	Pts	Qualification or relegation
1	Dontan PCCM	2	1	1	0	4	1	+3	4	Qualification to Third Round
2	Yingcharoen	2	1	0	1	1	3	−2	3	Qualification to Third Round
3	King Mongkut's University of Technology North Bangkok	2	0	1	1	1	2	−1	1	

Updated to match(es) played on unknown. Source: Thai Division 3
Rules for classification: 1) points; 2) goal difference; 3) number of goals scored.

8 January 2017	Yingcharoen	1 - 0	King Mongkut's University of Technology North Bangkok	Bangkok
10:00 (UTC+7)				Stadium: Nong Chok National Football Center 1

10 January 2017	King Mongkut's University of Technology North Bangkok	1 - 1	Dontan PCCM	Bangkok
15:00 (UTC+7)				Stadium: Nong Chok National Football Center 1

12 January 2017	Dontan PCCM	3 - 0	Yingcharoen	Bangkok
13:00 (UTC+7)				Stadium: Nong Chok National Football Center 2

=== Group K ===
Pos	Team	Pld	W	D	L	GF	GA	GD	Pts	Qualification or relegation
1	Chandrakasem Rajabhat University	2	2	0	0	8	2	+6	6	Qualification to Third Round
2	Royal Thai Air Force Welfare Department	2	1	0	1	5	4	+1	3	Qualification to Third Round
3	KrungKao	2	0	0	2	3	10	−7	0	

Updated to match(es) played on unknown. Source: Thai Division 3
Rules for classification: 1) points; 2) goal difference; 3) number of goals scored.

8 January 2017	Chandrakasem Rajabhat University	3 - 0	Royal Thai Air Force Welfare Department	Bangkok
13:00 (UTC+7)				Stadium: Nong Chok National Football Center 1

10 January 2017	Royal Thai Air Force Welfare Department	5 - 1	KrungKao	Bangkok
10:00 (UTC+7)				Stadium: Nong Chok National Football Center 2

12 January 2017	KrungKao	2 - 5	Chandrakasem Rajabhat University	Bangkok
15:00 (UTC+7)				Stadium: Nong Chok National Football Center 2

=== Group L ===
Pos	Team	Pld	W	D	L	GF	GA	GD	Pts	Qualification or relegation
1	Bang Pa-In School (drew in 1st position)	2	1	1	0	7	2	+5	4	Qualification to Third Round
2	Royal Thai Air Force Academy (drew in 2nd position)	2	1	1	0	5	2	+3	4	Qualification to Third Round
3	Bangplub	2	0	0	2	2	10	−8	0	

Updated to match(es) played on unknown. Source: Thai Division 3
Rules for classification: 1) points; 2) goal difference; 3) number of goals scored.

8 January 2017	Bang Pa-In School	1 - 1	Royal Thai Air Force Academy	Bangkok
15:00 (UTC+7)				Stadium: Nong Chok National Football Center 1

10 January 2017	Royal Thai Air Force Academy	4 - 1	Bangplub	Bangkok
13:00 (UTC+7)				Stadium: Nong Chok National Football Center 2

12 January 2017	Bangplub	1 - 6	Bang Pa-In School	Bangkok
10:00 (UTC+7)				Stadium: Nong Chok National Football Center 3

=== Group M ===
Pos	Team	Pld	W	D	L	GF	GA	GD	Pts	Qualification or relegation
1	Bansomdejchaopraya Rajabhat University	2	2	0	0	9	5	+4	6	Qualification to Third Round
2	Tanmananusorn Foundation	2	1	0	1	4	4	0	3	Qualification to Third Round
3	Singburi United	2	0	0	2	4	8	−4	0	

Updated to match(es) played on unknown. Source: Thai Division 3
Rules for classification: 1) points; 2) goal difference; 3) number of goals scored.

8 January 2017	Singburi United	4 - 5	Bansomdejchaopraya Rajabhat University	Bangkok
10:00 (UTC+7)				Stadium: Nong Chok National Football Center 2

10 January 2017	Bansomdejchaopraya Rajabhat University	4 - 1	Tanmananusorn Foundation	Bangkok
15:00 (UTC+7)				Stadium: Nong Chok National Football Center 2

12 January 2017	Tanmananusorn Foundation	3 - 0	Singburi United	Bangkok
13:00 (UTC+7)				Stadium: Nong Chok National Football Center 3

=== Group N ===
Pos	Team	Pld	W	D	L	GF	GA	GD	Pts	Qualification or relegation
1	Pichaya Kasem Technological College (drew in 1st position)	2	1	0	1	8	3	+5	3	Qualification to Third Round
2	Mahanakorn (drew in 2nd position)	2	1	0	1	3	7	−4	3	Qualification to Third Round
3	Ramkhamhaeng University (drew in 3rd position)	2	1	0	1	2	3	−1	3	

Updated to match(es) played on unknown. Source: Thai Division 3
Rules for classification: 1) points; 2) goal difference; 3) number of goals scored.

8 January 2017	Ramkhamhaeng University	2 - 1	Pichaya Kasem Technological College	Bangkok
13:00 (UTC+7)				Stadium: Nong Chok National Football Center 2

10 January 2017	Pichaya Kasem Technological College	7 - 1	Mahanakorn	Bangkok
10:00 (UTC+7)				Stadium: Nong Chok National Football Center 3

12 January 2017	Mahanakorn	2 - 0	Ramkhamhaeng University	Bangkok
15:00 (UTC+7)				Stadium: Nong Chok National Football Center 3

=== Group O ===
Pos	Team	Pld	W	D	L	GF	GA	GD	Pts	Qualification or relegation
1	Petchchaiyapruek	2	1	1	0	6	3	+3	4	Qualification to Third Round
2	Nakornpathom Rajabhat University	2	1	0	1	6	3	+3	3	Qualification to Third Round
3	Forester	2	0	1	1	3	9	−6	1	

Updated to match(es) played on unknown. Source: Thai Division 3
Rules for classification: 1) points; 2) goal difference; 3) number of goals scored.

8 January 2017	Nakornpathom Rajabhat University	6 - 0	Forester	Bangkok
15:00 (UTC+7)				Stadium: Nong Chok National Football Center 2

10 January 2017	Forester	3 - 3	Petchchaiyapruek	Bangkok
13:00 (UTC+7)				Stadium: Nong Chok National Football Center 3

13 January 2017	Petchchaiyapruek	3 - 0	Nakornpathom Rajabhat University	Bangkok
15:00 (UTC+7)				Stadium: Nong Chok National Football Center 1

=== Group P ===
Pos	Team	Pld	W	D	L	GF	GA	GD	Pts	Qualification or relegation
1	Kasetsart University Kamphaeng Saen Campus	2	2	0	0	4	2	+2	6	Qualification to Third Round
2	Uthenthawai	2	1	0	1	3	3	0	3	Qualification to Third Round
3	Lumplee Subdistrict Municipality	2	0	0	2	4	6	−2	0	

Updated to match(es) played on unknown. Source: Thai Division 3
Rules for classification: 1) points; 2) goal difference; 3) number of goals scored.

8 January 2017	Uthenthawai	3 - 2	Lumplee Subdistrict Municipality	Bangkok
10:00 (UTC+7)				Stadium: Nong Chok National Football Center 3

10 January 2017	Lumplee Subdistrict Municipality	2 - 3	Kasetsart University Kamphaeng Saen Campus	Bangkok
15:00 (UTC+7)				Stadium: Nong Chok National Football Center 3

13 January 2017	Kasetsart University Kamphaeng Saen Campus	1 - 0	Uthenthawai	Bangkok
15:00 (UTC+7)				Stadium: Nong Chok National Football Center 1

=== Group Q ===
Pos	Team	Pld	W	D	L	GF	GA	GD	Pts	Qualification or relegation
1	SWU United	3	2	1	0	9	5	+4	7	Qualification to Third Round
2	Wat Suthiwararam School (drew in 2nd position)	3	1	1	1	5	6	−1	4	Qualification to Third Round
3	Phon Commercial and Technical College (drew in 3rd position)	3	1	1	1	5	1	+4	4	
4	Wangpailom SC	3	0	1	2	3	10	−7	1	

Updated to match(es) played on unknown. Source: Thai Division 3
Rules for classification: 1) points; 2) goal difference; 3) number of goals scored.

8 January 2017	Phon Commercial and Technical College	4 - 0	Wangpailom Sport Club	Bangkok
13:00 (UTC+7)				Stadium: Nong Chok National Football Center 3

8 January 2017	SWU United	5 - 3	Wat Suthiwararam School	Bangkok
15:00 (UTC+7)				Stadium: Nong Chok National Football Center 3

11 January 2017	Phon Commercial and Technical College	0 - 0	SWU United	Bangkok
10:00 (UTC+7)				Stadium: Nong Chok National Football Center 1

11 January 2017	Wangpailom Sport Club	1 - 1	Wat Suthiwararam School	Bangkok
13:00 (UTC+7)				Stadium: Nong Chok National Football Center 1

13 January 2017	Wangpailom Sport Club	4 - 2	SWU United	Bangkok
10:00 (UTC+7)				Stadium: Nong Chok National Football Center 1

13 January 2017	Wat Suthiwararam School	1 - 0	Phon Commercial and Technical College	Bangkok
10:00 (UTC+7)				Stadium: Nong Chok National Football Center 2

=== Group R ===
Pos	Team	Pld	W	D	L	GF	GA	GD	Pts	Qualification or relegation
1	Singburi Kopoon	3	3	0	0	12	1	+11	9	Qualification to Third Round
2	Rajamangala University Of Technology Rattanakosin (drew in 2nd position)	3	1	1	1	3	5	−2	4	Qualification to Third Round
3	Bangpla CCP (drew in 3rd position)	3	1	1	1	5	6	−1	4	
4	Ratchaburi NNK BPF United	3	0	0	3	1	9	−8	0	

Updated to match(es) played on unknown. Source: Thai Division 3
Rules for classification: 1) points; 2) goal difference; 3) number of goals scored.

9 January 2017	Ratchaburi NNK BPF United	0 - 4	Singburi Kopoon	Bangkok
10:00 (UTC+7)				Stadium: Nong Chok National Football Center 1

9 January 2017	Rajamangala University Of Technology Rattanakosin	1 - 1	Bangpla CCP	Bangkok
13:00 (UTC+7)				Stadium: Nong Chok National Football Center 1

11 January 2017	Ratchaburi NNK BPF United	1 - 2	Rajamangala University Of Technology Rattanakosin	Bangkok
15:00 (UTC+7)				Stadium: Nong Chok National Football Center 1

11 January 2017	Singburi Kopoon	5 - 1	Bangpla CCP	Bangkok
10:00 (UTC+7)				Stadium: Nong Chok National Football Center 2

13 January 2017	Singburi Kopoon	3 - 0	Rajamangala University Of Technology Rattanakosin	Bangkok
13:00 (UTC+7)				Stadium: Nong Chok National Football Center 1

13 January 2017	Bangpla CCP	3 - 0	Ratchaburi NNK BPF United	Bangkok
13:00 (UTC+7)				Stadium: Nong Chok National Football Center 2

== Second round ==
14 January 2017	Ratchadamnoen Commercial School	1 - 0	Dhurakij Pundit University	Bangkok
13:00 (UTC+7)				Stadium: Nong Chok National Football Center 2

14 January 2017	Traill International school	2(4) - 2(6)	Naval Medical Department	Bangkok
15:00 (UTC+7)				Stadium: Nong Chok National Football Center 2

== Third round ==
15 January 2017	Nongkhae	2 - 1	New Bridge Thonglor	Bangkok
13:00 (UTC+7)				Stadium: Nong Chok National Football Center 1

15 January 2017	Tan Diao TAO	4 - 2	Yingcharoen	Bangkok
15:00 (UTC+7)				Stadium: Nong Chok National Football Center 1

15 January 2017	Ayodhya City	3 - 1	Royal Thai Air Force Welfare Department	Bangkok
13:00 (UTC+7)				Stadium: Nong Chok National Football Center 2

15 January 2017	Laem Sing Fisheries Association	4 - 1	Royal Thai Air Force Academy	Bangkok
15:00 (UTC+7)				Stadium: Nong Chok National Football Center 2

16 January 2017	Donmuang Police Station	3 - 1	Tanmananusorn Foundation	Bangkok
13:00 (UTC+7)				Stadium: Nong Chok National Football Center 1

16 January 2017	Vongchavalitkul University	0(4) - 0(3)	Mahanakorn	Bangkok
15:00 (UTC+7)				Stadium: Nong Chok National Football Center 1

16 January 2017	Playmaker United	1 - 3	Nakornpathom Rajabhat University	Bangkok
13:00 (UTC+7)				Stadium: Nong Chok National Football Center 2

16 January 2017	Therdthai Diamond	1(4) - 1(3)	Uthenthawai	Bangkok
15:00 (UTC+7)				Stadium: Nong Chok National Football Center 2

17 January 2017	Sing Ubon	1 - 2	Wat Suthiwararam School	Bangkok
13:00 (UTC+7)				Stadium: Nong Chok National Football Center 1

17 January 2017	Dontan PCCM	1 - 0	Rajamangala University Of Technology Rattanakosin	Bangkok
15:00 (UTC+7)				Stadium: Nong Chok National Football Center 1

17 January 2017	Chandrakasem Rajabhat University	1(10) - 1(9)	Thonburi University	Bangkok
13:00 (UTC+7)				Stadium: Nong Chok National Football Center 2

17 January 2017	Bang Pa-In School	3 - 1	DHL All Stars	Bangkok
15:00 (UTC+7)				Stadium: Nong Chok National Football Center 2

18 January 2017	Bansomdejchaopraya Rajabhat University	2 - 0	Ratchadamnoen Commercial School	Bangkok
13:00 (UTC+7)				Stadium: Nong Chok National Football Center 1

18 January 2017	Pichaya Kasem Technological College	2 - 0	Naval Medical Department	Bangkok
15:00 (UTC+7)				Stadium: Nong Chok National Football Center 1

18 January 2017	Petchchaiyapruek	3(5) - 3(7)	SWU United	Bangkok
13:00 (UTC+7)				Stadium: Nong Chok National Football Center 2

18 January 2017	Kasetsart University Kamphaeng Saen Campus	0 - 5	Singburi Kopoon	Bangkok
15:00 (UTC+7)				Stadium: Nong Chok National Football Center 2

== Fourth round ==
20 January 2017	Nongkhae	0 - 2	Singburi Kopoon	Bangkok
13:00 (UTC+7)				Stadium: Nong Chok National Football Center 1

20 January 2017	Tan Diao TAO	2 - 0	SWU United	Bangkok
15:00 (UTC+7)				Stadium: Nong Chok National Football Center 1

20 January 2017	Ayodhya City	0(4) - 0(5)	Pichaya Kasem Technological College	Bangkok
13:00 (UTC+7)				Stadium: Nong Chok National Football Center 2

20 January 2017	Laem Sing Fisheries Association	1 - 2	Bansomdejchaopraya Rajabhat University	Bangkok
15:00 (UTC+7)				Stadium: Nong Chok National Football Center 2

21 January 2017	Donmuang Police Station	1 - 2	Bang Pa-In School	Bangkok
13:00 (UTC+7)				Stadium: Nong Chok National Football Center 1

21 January 2017	Vongchavalitkul University	3 - 2	Chandrakasem Rajabhat University	Bangkok
15:00 (UTC+7)				Stadium: Nong Chok National Football Center 1

21 January 2017	Nakornpathom Rajabhat University	1(5) - 1(6)	Dontan PCCM	Bangkok
13:00 (UTC+7)				Stadium: Nong Chok National Football Center 2

21 January 2017	Therdthai Diamond	1 - 4	Wat Suthiwararam School	Bangkok
15:00 (UTC+7)				Stadium: Nong Chok National Football Center 2

== Quarter-finals Round ==
23 January 2017	Singburi Kopoon	4 - 0	Bang Pa-In School	Bangkok
13:00 (UTC+7)				Stadium: Nong Chok National Football Center 1

23 January 2017	Tan Diao TAO	1 - 2	Vongchavalitkul University	Bangkok
15:00 (UTC+7)				Stadium: Nong Chok National Football Center 1

23 January 2017	Pichaya Kasem Technological College	1 - 0	Dontan PCCM	Bangkok
13:00 (UTC+7)				Stadium: Nong Chok National Football Center 2

23 January 2017	Bansomdejchaopraya Rajabhat University	1 - 4	Wat Suthiwararam School	Bangkok
15:00 (UTC+7)				Stadium: Nong Chok National Football Center 2

== Semi-finals Round ==
25 January 2017	Singburi Kopoon	1 - 0	Pichaya Kasem Technological College	Bangkok
13:00 (UTC+7)				Stadium: Nong Chok National Football Center 1

25 January 2017	Vongchavalitkul University	2 - 0	Wat Suthiwararam School	Bangkok
13:00 (UTC+7)				Stadium: Nong Chok National Football Center 1

== Final round ==
27 January 2017	Singburi Kopoon	1(4) - 1(3)	Vongchavalitkul University	Bangkok
13:00 (UTC+7)				Stadium: Nong Chok National Football Center 1

== Winner ==
2016 Thai Division 3 Tournament Central Region
Singburi Kopoon
1st title

== See also ==
- 2016 Thai Division 3 Tournament Northern Region
- 2016 Thai Division 3 Tournament North Eastern Region
- 2016 Thai Division 3 Tournament Eastern Region
- 2016 Thai Division 3 Tournament Southern Region
