= Bangplub F.C. =

Thai football club

Bangplub Don Army บางพลับ ดอนทหารบก
- Full name: Bangplub Don Army Football Club สโมสรฟุตบอลบางพลับ ดอนทหารบก
- Founded: 2015; 10 years ago
- Ground: ? Nonthaburi, Thailand
- League: 2017 Thailand Amateur League Bangkok Metropolitan Region

Bangplub Don Army Football Club (Thai สโมสรฟุตบอลบางพลับ ดอนทหารบก), is a Thai Association football club based in Nonthaburi, Thailand. The club played in the 2017 Thailand Amateur League Bangkok Metropolitan Region.

== Record ==
Season	League									FA Cup	League Cup	Top goalscorer	
Season	Division	P	W	D	L	F	A	Pts	Pos	FA Cup	League Cup	Name	Goals
2016	DIV 3 Central	2	0	0	2	2	10	0	35th - 56th	QR	Can't Enter		
2017	TA Bangkok	1	0	0	1	1	5	0	13th - 24th	Not Enter	Can't Enter		
2018	TA Bangkok									Not Enter	Can't Enter		

Champions	Runners-up	Promoted	Relegated
