= Khǒr Royal Cup =

- Organising body: Football Association of Thailand
- Founded: 1916
- Folded: 2015
- Country: Thailand
- Domestic cup: Thai FA Cup

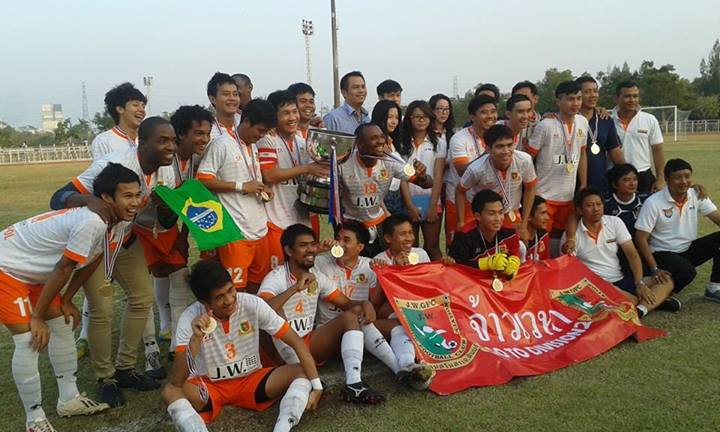
J.W. Group, the winner of the 2013 Khǒr Royal Cup

Khǒr Royal Cup (Thai: ถ้วยพระราชทานประเภท ข.; ถ้วย ข.), known as the Noi Cup (ถ้วยน้อย) until 1963, was a part of the Thai football league system, founded by the Football Association of Thailand in 1916.

Khǒr Royal Cup was the second-highest level of the Thai football league system from 1916 to 1995. The Khǒr Royal Cup was downgraded to the third-tier tournament in 1996, replaced by the Thai Division 1 League. In 2006, the tournament was further downgraded to the fourth-tier of Thai football due to the proposed merger of the Provincial League and Thai Premier League into one entity. In 2016, the Khǒr Royal Cup was combined with Khor Royal Cup and Ngor Royal Cup into Regional League Division 3, and the tournament's cup become a trophy for Thai Division 1 League.

== Tournament format ==
Each season or edition of the tournament was populated by clubs from its previous season which were neither promoted nor relegated, joined by the best four clubs promoted from the previous season of Khor Royal Cup. The first round was a group stage, with clubs divided into groups of 3 or 4 clubs. The winners and the runners-up of each group qualified to the knock-out stage. The finalists of the tournament were promoted to Regional League Division 2 for the following season, while the clubs which withdrew themselves from the tournament were relegated to Khor Royal Cup and Ngor Royal Cup for the following season.

== List of winners ==
Year	Winner	Result	Runner-up	Promoted Clubs
2015	Institute of Physical Education Samut Sakhon Campus	w/o	Sena Municipality^{1}	
2014	Army Welfare Department	3–1	Thepsatri Rajabhat University Lopburi	
2013	J.W. Group	2–1	Ratchaphruek College	
2012	Rayong Province Club	3–3 (8–7)p	Hua Hin Municipality	
2011	Bangkok Glass Sport Association	1–0	Thai Christian Sport Association	
2010	Goblex Realty Staff Association	3–1	Assumption Thonburi School	
2009	Thai Marine Regiment	0–0 (4–2)p	Royal Thai Fleet	
2008	Kasetsart University	1–0	Nakhon Sawan Rajabhat University	North Bangkok University Rangsit University
2007/08	Raj Pracha	2–2 (5–4)p	Kasem Bundit University F.C.	
2005/06	Thai Marine Regiment		Thai Airways	
Khǒr Royal Cup was downgraded to be the fourth tier since 2006.				
2004	Raj-Vithi		Samut Prakan Municipality	
2003	Thai Honda		Customs department	
2002	Air Technical Training School		Central Sport Association	
2001	Bang Phra Municipality		Nong Jorg Pitthayanusorn School	
2000	Krung Kao Sport Association		Bangkok University	Kasetsart University
1999	Bangkok Christian College		Government Housing Bank	
1998	Provincial Electricity Authority		Central Sport Association	
1997	Thai Military Bank		Petroleum Authority of Thailand	
1996	Rayong Sport Association		Samut Prakan Confederation	The Crown Property Bureau Bank for agriculture and agricultural co-operatives
Khǒr Royal Cup was downgraded to be the third tier since 1996.				
1995	Raj-Vithi			
1994	Association of Stock Exchange			
1993	Krung Thai Bank			
1992	Port Authority of Thailand			
1991	Royal Thai Air Force			
1990	Thai Farmers Bank			
1989	Royal Thai Air Force			
1988	Royal Thai Police			
1987	Royal Thai Air Force			
1986	Royal Thai Air Force			
1985	Royal Thai Air Force			
1984	Thai Namthip			
1983	Port Authority of Thailand			
1982	Royal Thai Air Force			
1981	Port Authority of Thailand - Royal Thai Police			
1980	Royal Thai Army			
1979	Port Authority of Thailand			
1978	Bangkok Bank			
1977	Royal Thai Air Force			
1976	Port Authority of Thailand			
1975	Royal Thai Air Force - Siam Commercial Bank			
1974	Royal Thai Army - Siam Commercial Bank			
1973	Royal Thai Air Force			
1972	Royal Thai Air Force - Port Authority of Thailand			
1971	Bangkok Bank			
1970	Port Authority of Thailand			
1969	Bangkok Bank			
1968	Bangkok Bank			
1967	Royal Thai Air Force			
1966	Bangkok Bank			
1965	Royal Thai Air Force			
1964	Royal Thai Air Force			
1963	Bangkok Bank			
1962	Royal Thai Air Force			
1961	Royal Thai Air Force			
1960	Bangkok Municipality			
1959	Chulalongkorn Alumni Association			
1958	Debsirin Alumni Association			
1957	Chulalongkorn Alumni Association			
1956	Debsirin Alumni Association			
1955	Not held			
1954	Royal Thai Police			
1953	Royal Thai Police			
1952	Muslim Sport Club			
1951	Royal Thai Air Force			
1950	Royal Thai Air Force			
1949	Royal Thai Air Force			
1948	Chai Sod			
The tournament was suspended from 1931 to 1947 due to World War II and Thailand's domination by Khana Ratsadon before the 1947 Thai coup d'état				
1930	Assumption Club			
1929	Thailand Post			
1928	School of Law			
1927	Kong Dern Rot			
1926	Sri Krung			
1925	Siam Rat			
1924	Department of Performing Arts			
1923	Department of Performing Arts			
1922	Department of Performing Arts			
1921	Nakhon Chaisri County			
1920	Royal Thai Naval Academy			
1919	Department of Performing Arts			
1918	Department of Performing Arts			
1917	Department of Performing Arts			
1916	Royal Guards Regiment			

Note

1: Both semi-finalists, Air Technical Training School and Pak Chong Sport School, were disqualified due to sending illegal players to the field; the final match of the 2015 Khǒr Royal Cup wasn't held, and Institute of Physical Education Samut Sakhon Campus automatically won the tournament, while Sena municipality qualified as the runner-up.
