= Nong Chok Sport Stadium =

Sports Stadium

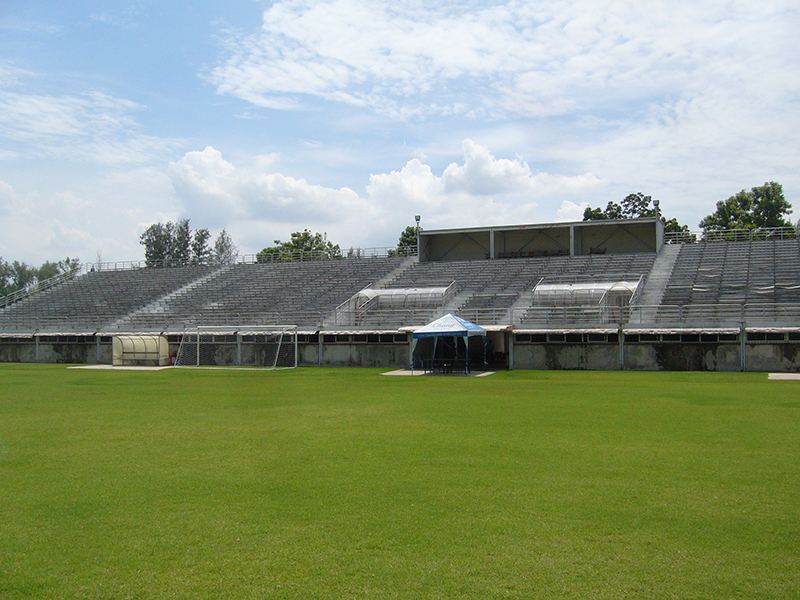
- Interactive map of Nong Chok Sport Stadium
- Former names: Tewson Stadium
- Location: Nong Chok, Bangkok, Thailand
- Coordinates: 13°52′06″N 100°50′49″E
- Owner: Nong Chok National Football Center
- Operator: Nong Chok National Football Center
- Capacity: 5,000
- Surface: Grass

Construction
- Opened: 2006

Nong Chok Sport Stadium (Thai: สนามกีฬาหนองจอก) is a stadium in Nong Chok, Bangkok, Thailand. It is situated in Nong Chok, the biggest and the least populated district of Bangkok. It is currently used mostly for the home games of BEC Tero Sasana FC in 2006 to 2009. The stadium holds 5,000 people. It located inside Nong Chok National Football Center.

The stadium has just one stand. It is unroofed and unseated. There is a grass bank behind the goal to the left of the stand and training pitches behind the other goal. Opposite the stand is a tree-lined grass bank. A perimeter fence separates spectators from the pitch. Unusually for a Thai stadium there is no athletics track. There are no floodlights either.

The stadium is the most basic in the Thai League 1.
