= Khor Royal Cup =

- Organising body: Football Association of Thailand
- Founded: 1963
- Folded: 2015
- Country: Thailand
- Domestic cup: Thai FA Cup

Khor Royal Cup (Thai: ถ้วยพระราชทาน ค.; ถ้วย ค.) is the fifth-highest level of club football competition which competed in the tournament in Thailand since 1963. It was founded by Football Association of Thailand along with Ngor Royal Cup in 1963. Department of Physical Education was the first team to win this competition.

In 1996, Khor Royal Cup was downgraded to be the fourth-tier football tournament of Thai club football competition when Football Association of Thailand founded Thai Division 1 League as the second-tier in its place. Finally, in 2006, the tournament was downgraded to be the fifth-tier tournament due to the proposed merger of the Provincial League and Thai Premier League into one entity.

In 2016, Khor Royal Cup was combined to Regional League Division 3 completely along with Khǒr Royal Cup and Ngor Royal Cup by Football Association of Thailand and then Khor Royal Cup become a trophy for Regional League Division 2.

== Tournament format ==
The clubs which are still in the division and the best eight clubs from the previous edition of Ngor Royal Cup join the tournament. The first round is group stage, and the clubs will be divided into a group of 3 or 4 clubs. The winners and the runners-up of each groups qualify to the knock-out stage. Only the best four or the semi-finalist clubs of the tournament promote to Khǒr Royal Cup next season while the clubs which withdraw themselves from the tournament will be relegated to Ngor Royal Cup next season.

== List of winners ==
Year	Champion	Result	Runner-up	Promoted clubs
2015	Pichayakasem Technological College	2-1	King Mongkut's University of Technology North Bangkok	Wang Sapung Municipality Chaichimplee Alumni Association
2014-15	Pak Chong School Alumni Association	3-0	Royal Irrigation Department	Wongchawalitkul University Alumni Association IPE Samut Sakhon Campus
2013-14^{1}	Ruam Namjai Foundation	2-1	Nakhon Ratchasima Sport School	Sena Municipality Bang Muang Municipality
2012	Hakka Association of Thailand	0-0(4-5)p	Prathueangthip Witthaya School	Hua Hin Municipality Nawama Rachanusorn School
2011	Rajapruek College	2-1	Thong Lor	Daisin Group Employee Association Air and Coastal Defense Command
2010	Globlex Realty Staff Association	Unknown	Unknown	
2008-09	J.W. Group	2-1	Bangkok Glass Sport Association	Kukot Municipality Thonburi University
2007-08	Baan Thung Ket School	3-1	Rangsit University	Chandhabhing F.A. North Bangkok College
2006	Debsirin Alumni Association	2-1	Thavorn Farm	
2005	Unknown			
2004	Eastern Asia University			
2003	Thepsatri Rajabhat University Lopburi			
2002	Thai Honda			
2001	Debsirin Alumni School			
2000	Royal Thai Customs			
1999	Union Bank			
1998	Bangkok Christian College			
1997	Kurusapa Business Organization			
1996	Thai Military Bank			
1995	The Crown Property Bureau			
1994	Bangkok Bank of Commerce			
1993	Association of Stock Exchange			
1992	Royal Thai Army			
1991	Royal Thai Army			Bangkok University
1990	Royal Thai Air Force			
1989	Royal Thai Navy			
1988	Royal Thai Army			
1987	Royal Thai Air Force			
1986	Royal Thai Air Force			
1985	Royal Thai Air Force			
1984	Thavorn Farm			
1983	Royal Thai Air Force			
1982	Royal Thai Army			
1981	Metropolitan Waterworks Authority			
1980	Port Authority of Thailand - Thamrong Thai F.A.			
1979	Bangkok Bank			
1978	Port Authority of Thailand			
1977	Port Authority of Thailand			
1976	Royal Turf Club of Thailand			
1975	Teacher's college of Mahasarakham			
1974	Port Authority of Thailand			
1973	Royal Thai Air Force - Lions Chonburi			
1972	Raj-Vithi			
1971	Royal Thai Air Force			
1970	Royal Thai Air Force			
1969	Port Authority of Thailand			
1968	Hakka Association of Thailand			
1967	Hakka Association of Thailand			
1966	Royal Thai Air Force			
1965	Not held			
1964	Baan Somdet Chao Phraya Alumni Association			
1963	Baan Somdet Chao Phraya Alumni Association			
1962	Department of Physical Education			

Note: 1. 2013-14 Khor Royal Cup was delayed due to 2013–14 Thai political crisis.
