= Therdthai Diamond F.C. =

Thai football club

Therdthai Diamond สโมสรเทิดไทไดมอนด์
- Full name: Therdthai Diamond Football Club สโมสรเทิดไทไดมอนด์
- Founded: 2009; 16 years ago
- Ground: ? Bangkok, Thailand
- League: 2016 Thai Division 3 League Central Region

Therdthai Diamond Football Club (Thai สโมสรเทิดไทไดมอนด์), is a Thai football club based in Bangkok, Thailand. The club is currently playing in the Thai Football Division 3.

== Record ==
Season	League									FA Cup	League Cup	Top goalscorer	
Season	Division	P	W	D	L	F	A	Pts	Pos	FA Cup	League Cup	Name	Goals
2016	DIV 3 Central												

Champions	Runners-up	Promoted	Relegated
