= 2016 Thai Division 3 Tournament Southern Region =

2016 Thai Football Division 3 Tournament Southern Region is the 1st season of the League competition since its establishment in 2016. It is in the fourth tier of the Thai football league system.

== Venue Stadium and locations (2016) ==
All matches played in Wiang Sa District, Surat Thani

Coordinates	Location	Stadium	Capacity
8°39′43″N 99°22′31″E	Wiang Sa District, Surat Thani	Wiang Sa District Stadium (Wiang Sa Municipal Stadium)	?

== Member clubs ==
Section	Club	Province	Years
1	Muangkhon United	Nakhon Si Thammarat	2016
1	Sungaipadee	Narathiwat	2016
1	Surat Thani United	Surat Thani	2016
1	Newball Satun	Satun	2016

== Qualification format ==
All four teams play a one-legged round-robin match. The best two teams advance to the final round, and the winner of the final round is promoted to the 2017 Thai Division 2 League.

== First round ==
Pos	Team	Pld	W	D	L	GF	GA	GD	Pts	Qualification or relegation
1	Surat Thani United (drew in 1st position)	3	0	3	0	3	3	0	3	Advance to the Final Round
2	Sungaipadee (drew in 2nd position)	3	0	3	0	1	1	0	3	Advance to the Final Round
3	Newball Satun (drew in 3rd position)	3	0	3	0	1	1	0	3	
4	Muangkhon United (drew in 4th position)	3	0	3	0	1	1	0	3	

Updated to match(es) played on unknown. Source: Thai Division 3
Rules for classification: 1) points; 2) goal difference; 3) number of goals scored.

23 December 2016	Sungaipadee	0–0	Newball Satun	Surat Thani
13:00 (UTC+7)				Stadium: Wiang Sa District Stadium

23 December 2016	Muangkhon United	1–1	Surat Thani United	Surat Thani
15:00 (UTC+7)				Stadium: Wiang Sa District Stadium

25 December 2016	Newball Satun	0–0	Muangkhon United	Surat Thani
13:00 (UTC+7)				Stadium: Wiang Sa District Stadium

25 December 2016	Sungaipadee	1–1	Surat Thani United	Surat Thani
15:00 (UTC+7)				Stadium: Wiang Sa District Stadium

27 December 2016	Sungaipadee	0–0	Muangkhon United	Surat Thani
13:00 (UTC+7)				Stadium: Wiang Sa District Stadium

27 December 2016	Newball Satun	1–1	Surat Thani United	Surat Thani
15:00 (UTC+7)				Stadium: Wiang Sa District Stadium

== Final round ==
29 December 2016	Surat Thani United	1(5) – 1(4)	Sungaipadee	Surat Thani
15:30 (UTC+7)				Stadium: Wiang Sa District Stadium

== Winner ==
2016 Thai Division 3 Tournament Southern Region
Surat Thani United
1st title

== See also ==
- 2016 Thai Division 3 Tournament Northern Region
- 2016 Thai Division 3 Tournament North Eastern Region
- 2016 Thai Division 3 Tournament Central Region
- 2016 Thai Division 3 Tournament Eastern Region
