= Lumplee F.C. =

Thai football club

Lumplee องค์การบริหารส่วนตำบลลุมพลี
- Full name: Lumplee Football Club องค์การบริหารส่วนตำบลลุมพลี
- Founded: 2016; 10 years ago
- Ground: ? Ayutthaya, Thailand
- League: 2016 Thai Division 3 League Central Region

Lumplee Football Club (Thai องค์การบริหารส่วนตำบลลุมพลี), is a Thai football club based in Ayutthaya province, Thailand. The club is currently playing in the Thai Football Division 3.

== Record ==
Season	League									FA Cup	League Cup	Top goalscorer	
Season	Division	P	W	D	L	F	A	Pts	Pos	FA Cup	League Cup	Name	Goals
2016	DIV 3 Central	0	0	0	2	4	6	0	35th - 56th				

Champions	Runners-up	Promoted	Relegated
