= Forester F.C. =

Thai football club

Forester ฟอเรสเตอร์เอฟซี
- Full name: Forester Football Club ฟอเรสเตอร์เอฟซี
- Founded: 2007; 18 years ago
- Ground: Insi Chandrasatitya Stadium; Bangkok, Thailand
- League: 2016 Thai Division 3 League Central Region

Forester Football Club (Thai ฟอเรสเตอร์ เอฟซี) is a Thai semi-professional Football Club of Faculty of Forestry, Kasetsart University based in Bang Khen District, Bangkok, Thailand. The club is currently playing in the Thai Football Division 3.

== Record ==
Season	League									FA Cup	League Cup	Top goalscorer	
Season	Division	P	W	D	L	F	A	Pts	Pos	FA Cup	League Cup	Name	Goals
2016	DIV 3 Central												

Champions	Runners-up	Promoted	Relegated
