= Wangpailom Sport Club F.C. =

Thai football club

Wangpailom SC วังไผ่ล้อม เอสซี
- Full name: Wangpailom Sport Club Football Club สโมสรฟุตบอลวังไผ่ล้อม สปอร์ต คลับ
- Founded: 2013; 12 years ago
- Ground: ? Bangkok, Thailand
- League: 2018 Thailand Amateur League Eastern Region

Wangpailom Sport Club Football Club (Thai สโมสรฟุตบอลวังไผ่ล้อม สปอร์ต คลับ), is a Thai football club based in Bangkok, Thailand. The club is currently playing in the 2018 Thailand Amateur League Eastern Region.

== Record ==
| Season | League | | | | | | | | | FA Cup | League Cup | Top goalscorer | |
| Season | Division | P | W | D | L | F | A | Pts | Pos | FA Cup | League Cup | Name | Goals |
|---|---|---|---|---|---|---|---|---|---|---|---|---|---|
| 2013 | Ngor Royal Cup | 6 | 5 | 0 | 1 | 17 | 9 | 15 | 3rd – 4th | Don't know | Can't Enter | | |
| 2016 | DIV 3 Central | 3 | 0 | 1 | 2 | 3 | 10 | 1 | 35th – 46th | Don't Enter | Can't Enter | | |
| 2017 | TA East | 5 | 1 | 1 | 3 | 5 | 14 | 4 | 11th – 12th | QR | Can't Enter | | |
| 2018 | TA East | 6 | 5 | 0 | 1 | 16 | 9 | 15 | 2nd | Not Enter | Can't Enter | Jo Mingsamorn | 5 |

| Champions | Runners-up | Promoted | Relegated |
