= Surat Thani United F.C. =

Thai football club

Surat thani United สุราษฎร์ธานี ยูไนเต็ด
- Full name: Surat thani United Football Club สโมสรฟุตบอลสุราษฎร์ธานี ยูไนเต็ด
- Founded: 2016; 10 years ago
- Ground: Phunphin district Stadium; Surat Thani, Thailand
- League: Thai League 4

Surat thani United Football Club (Thai: สโมสรฟุตบอลสุราษฎร์ธานี ยูไนเต็ด), is a Thai football club based in Surat Thani, Thailand. The club get currently champion in the 2016 Football Division 3 of Southern Region and was promoted to Thai League 4 Southern Region. Although The club don't pass Club-Liciencing of T4, The club was automatically relegated to 2017 Thailand Amateur League Southern Region again. The club was formed in 2016 and entered the Thai Football Division 3 in same years.

== Stadium and locations ==
Coordinates	Location	Stadium	Capacity	Year
9°06′42″N 99°13′46″E	Surat	Phunphin District Stadium	???	2017

== Season By Season Record ==
Season	League									FA Cup	League Cup	Top goalscorer	
Season	Division	P	W	D	L	F	A	Pts	Pos	FA Cup	League Cup	Name	Goals
2016	DIV 3 South	4	0	4	0	4	4	4	1st	Not Enter	Not Enter		
2017–present	TA South	Did not enter											

Champions	Runners-up	Promoted	Relegated

== Honours ==
=== Domestic Leagues ===
- Football Division 3
  - Winners (1): 2016
