= Nong Chok National Football Center =

Football Association

Nong Chok National Football Center ศูนย์ฝึกฟุตบอลแห่งชาติ หนองจอก
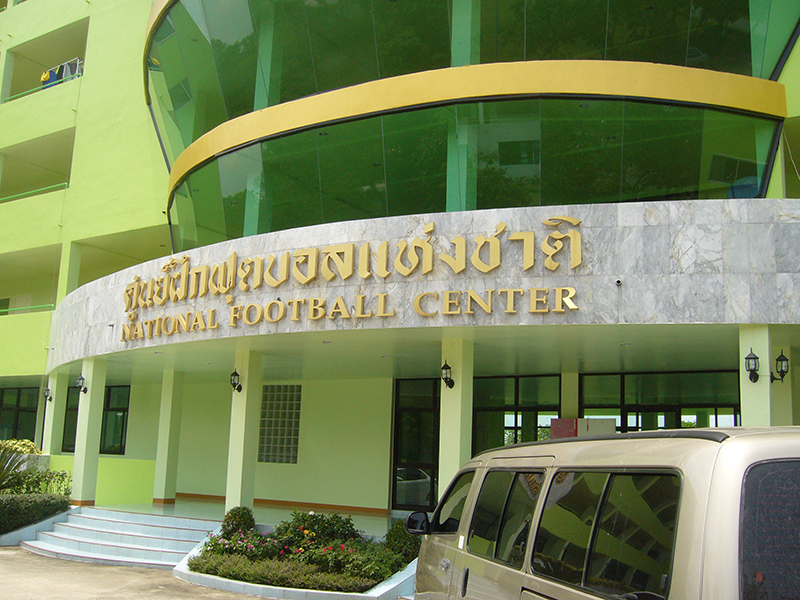
- Established: 16 September 2009 (official opening)
- Budget: 31,279,32 Thai Baht
- Endowment: FIFA
- Address: Soi Mitmaitri 6/3, Mitmaitri Rd., Nong Chok District, Bangkok, 10530
- Location: Nong Chok, Bangkok, Thailand
- Coordinates: 13°52′06″N 100°50′49″E
- Interactive map of Nong Chok National Football Center ศูนย์ฝึกฟุตบอลแห่งชาติ หนองจอก

Nong Chok National Football Center (Thai: ศูนย์ฝึกฟุตบอลแห่งชาติ หนองจอก) is the Football Association of Thailand's national football centre. It rests on an 80-acre (32 ha) site in Nong Chok, Bangkok. The center officially opened on 16 September 2009 by Sepp Blatter, a former president of FIFA.

== History ==
The Nong Chok National Football Center was built pursuant to the policy adopted by the Fédération Internationale de Football Association (FIFA) to provide a national football training center to the 11 countries of Southeast Asia, namely Brunei, Burma (Myanmar), Cambodia, Timor-Leste, Indonesia, Laos, Malaysia, the Philippines, Singapore, Thailand and Vietnam.

Worawi Makudi, the Association's General Secretary at the time, offered to donate 80 acres (32 ha) of land along the Mitrmitree Road in Nong Chok District to Vijit Ketkaew, the President of the Association at the time, and the land was subsequently designated. The proposed budget amounted to US $ 860,000 (26,797,035 THB) of FIFA funding. Construction was approved to begin in 2002 and last through 2006. Additional construction expenses were to be covered by the Football Association of Thailand.

The first phase of construction included three office buildings, a football field, training rooms and classrooms. Later, in compliance with FIFA, the Football Association of Thailand installed an artificial turf football field. FIFA President Sepp Blatter opened the training center on September 16, 2009.

== Facilities ==
The Nong Chok building has approximately 50 rooms, includes 4 bedrooms, 5 training grounds, Nong Chok Sport Stadium, a medical centre, a fitness centre, and a swimming pool (120 rooms were planned).

== Use ==
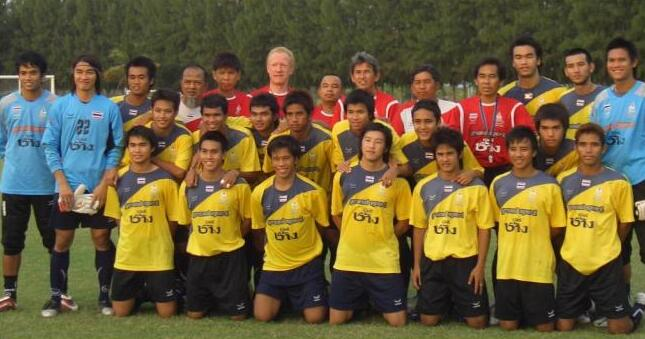
Thai national football team for the Asian Games 2006 training at Nong Chok National Football Center

The Nong Chok National Football Center was used to train the Thailand National Football Team, Thailand women's national football team, Thailand national beach soccer team, Thailand national futsal team and can be used to train teams from the ASEAN Football Federation.

== Gallery ==
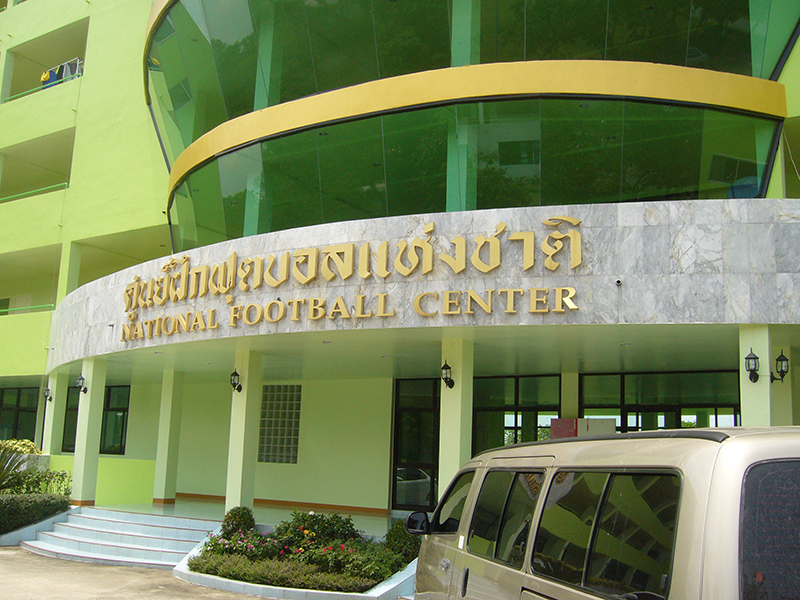

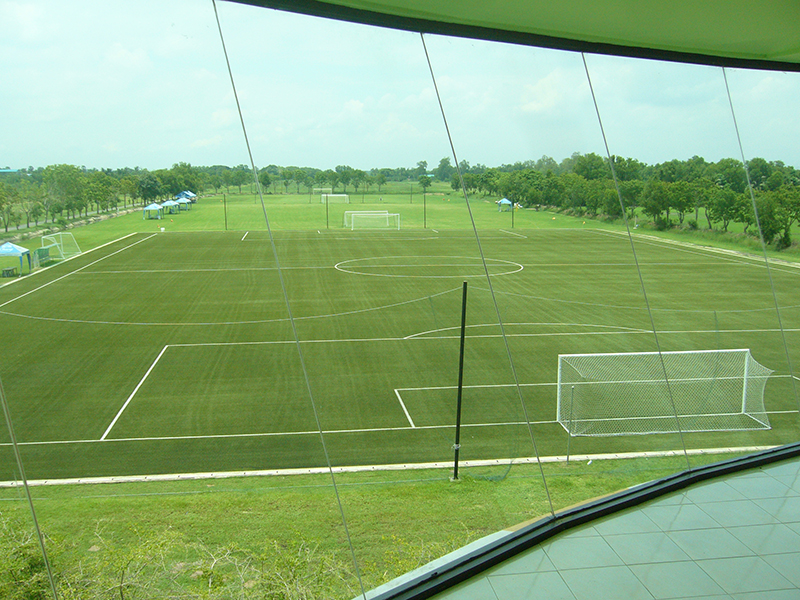

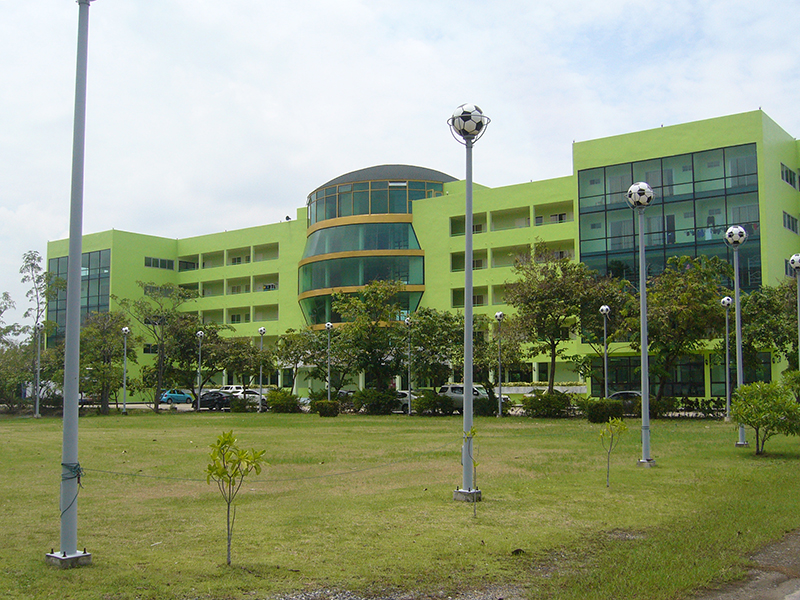

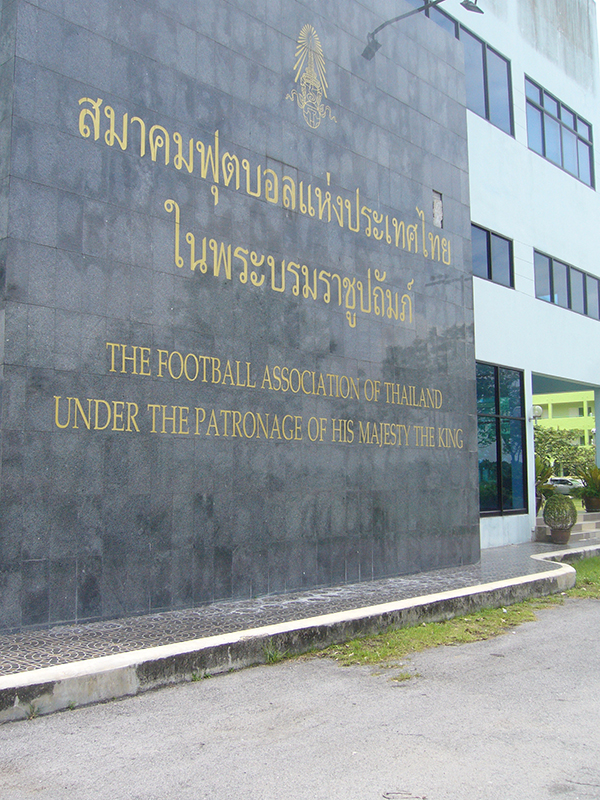

== See also ==
- Football Association of Thailand
- Thailand national football team
- High Performance Training Center
