= Petchchaiyapruek F.C. =

Thai football club

Petchchaiyapruek เพชรชัยพฤกษ์ เอฟซี
- Full name: Petchchaiyapruek Football Club สโมสรฟุตบอล เพชรชัยพฤกษ์
- Founded: 2011; 14 years ago
- Ground: Sukkoki Football Stadium; Bangkok, Thailand
- Chairman: Issara Campakum
- Head Coach: Issara Campakum, Chakri Lengpuang – Manager
- League: 2018 Thailand Amateur League Bangkok Metropolitan Region

Petchchaiyapruek Football Club (Thai : สโมสรฟุตบอล เพชรชัยพฤกษ์), is a Thai football club based in Bangkok, Thailand. The club is currently playing in the 2018 Thailand Amateur League Bangkok Metropolitan Region.

== Record ==
Season	League									FA Cup	League Cup	Top goalscorer	
Season	Division	P	W	D	L	F	A	Pts	Pos	FA Cup	League Cup	Name	Goals
2016	DIV 3 Central												
2017	–	–	–	–	–	–	–	–	–	–	–	–	–
2018	TA Bangkok												
2019	TA Bangkok												

Champions	Runners-up	Promoted	Relegated
