= Muangkhon WU F.C. =

Thai football club

Muangkhon WU F.C. เมืองคอน ดับบลิวยู เอฟ.ซี.
- Full name: Muangkhon Walailak University Football club สโมสรฟุตบอลเมืองคอนมหาวิทยาลัยวลัยลักษณ์
- Nickname(s): Big Owls นกฮูกมหากาฬ
- Founded: 2018; 7 years ago as Muangkhon WU F.C.
- Ground: Walailak University Stadium; Nakhon Si Thammarat, Thailand
- Chairman: Tawatchai Supadit
- Head Coach: Alongkorn Sakornwirote
- League: Thai League 4
- Website: https://www.thaileague.co.th/club-info/?id=221&tn=41

Muangkhon WU Football Club (Thai สโมสรฟุตบอลเมืองคอนดับบลิวยู), is a Thai amateur football club based in Nakhon Si Thammarat, Thailand. The club is currently playing in the Thai League 4.

== Stadium and locations ==
Coordinates	Location	Stadium	Year
8°38′59″N 99°52′44″E	Nakhon Si Thammarat (Tha Sala)	Walailak University Stadium	2019 – present

== Record ==
Season	League									FA Cup	League Cup	Top goalscorer	
Season	Division	P	W	D	L	F	A	Pts	Pos	FA Cup	League Cup	Name	Goals
2016	DIV 3 South	3	0	3	0	1	1	3	4th	Not Enter	Can't Enter		
2017	TA South	2	1	0	1	5	3	3	2nd	Not Enter	Can't Enter		
2018	TA South								1st	Not Enter	Can't Enter		
2019	T4 South	24	5	6	13	30	58	21	7th	Not Enter	1st QF	(Iran) Chajouei Mahdi Mohammad	9

Champions	Runners-up	Promoted	Relegated

- P = Played
- W = Games won
- D = Games drawn
- L = Games lost
- F = Goals for
- A = Goals against
- Pts = Points
- Pos = Final position
- QR1 = First Qualifying Round
- QR2 = Second Qualifying Round
- R1 = Round 1
- R2 = Round 2
- R3 = Round 3
- R4 = Round 4
- R5 = Round 5
- R6 = Round 6
- QF = Quarter-finals
- SF = Semi-finals
- RU = Runners-up
- W = Winners
