= Football Division 3 =

- Organising body: Thai League
- Founded: 2016
- Folded: 2017
- Country: Thailand
- Confederation: AFC
- Promotion to: Regional League Division 2
- Relegation to: None
- Last champions: Regional stage Changphueak Chiang Mai(Northern); Wang Saphung (North Eastern); Bankhai United (Eastern); Singburi Kopoon (Central); Surat Thani United (Southern)

Football Division 3 (Thai: ฟุตบอลดิวิชั่น 3) is the fourth level of Thai football organized by Football Association of Thailand. It was started in 2016 by an idea from General Police Somyot Poompanmoung, the president of FA Thailand for improving all Thai Amateur clubs to be better and allowing other clubs which are in other regions chances to play in a national FA tournament. In 2016, the tournament is divided into 5 regions and participated by 104 clubs which are former members Khǒr, Khor, and Ngor Royal Cup, and debutants in the season. As the tournament is considered as the lowest level of Thai football, so the number of participants is unlimited as well as any club is able to send an application to participate in the tournament. In 2015 the Ngor Royal Cup became a trophy for the Football Division 3.

Football Division 3 played its final season in 2016 and the Thailand Amateur League began to play in 2017. All Football Division 3 clubs, became the original Thailand Amateur League members.

== Champions History ==
=== Champions of the 4th tier Thai football league system ===
| # | Season | Number of teams | Winner of Northern Region | Winner of North Eastern Region | Winner of Eastern Region | Winner of Central Region | Winner of Southern Region |
|---|---|---|---|---|---|---|---|
| 1 | 2016 | 104 | Changphueak Chiang Mai | Muang Loei United | Bankhai United | Singburi Kopoon | Surat Thani United |

== See also ==
- Football records in Thailand
