= 2019 Thai FA Cup =

Chang FA Cup

Tournament details
- Country: Thailand
- Dates: 27 March 2019 – 2 November 2019
- Teams: 100

Final positions
- Champions: Port (2nd title)
- Runners-up: Ratchaburi Mitr Phol

Tournament statistics
- Matches played: 99
- Goals scored: 421 (4.25 per match)
- Top goal scorer(s): Erivelto (8 goals)

Awards
- Best player: Go Seul-ki

The 2019 Thai FA Cup is the 26th season of a Thailand's knockout football competition. It was sponsored by Chang, and known as the Chang FA Cup (Thai: ช้าง เอฟเอคัพ) for sponsorship purposes. The tournament is organized by the Football Association of Thailand. 100 clubs were accepted into the tournament, and it began with the qualification round on 27 March 2019 and concluded with the final on 2 November 2019. The winner would have qualified for the 2020 AFC Champions League preliminary round 2 and the 2020 Thailand Champions Cup. Chiangrai United defend champion but was knocked out in quarter-final by Port.

== Calendar ==
| Round | Date | Matches | Clubs | New entries this round |
|---|---|---|---|---|
| Qualification round | 27 March 2019 | 36 | 15 + 12 + 17 + 28 → 36 | 15 2019 Thai League 2; 12 2019 Thai League 3; 17 2019 Thai League 4; 28 2019 Thailand Amateur League |
| First round | 1 May 2019 | 32 | 36 + 16 + 1 + 2 + 4 + 5 → 32 | 16 2019 Thai League 1; 1 2019 Thai League 2; 2 2019 Thai League 3; 4 2019 Thai League 4; 5 2019 Thailand Amateur League |
| Second round | 19 June 2019 | 16 | 32 → 16 | |
| Third round | 17 July 2019 | 8 | 16 → 8 | |
| Quarter-finals | 7 August 2019 | 4 | 8 → 4 | |
| Semi-finals | 18 September 2019 | 2 | 4 → 2 | |
| Final | 2 November 2019 | 1 | 2 → Champions | |
| Total | | | | 100 clubs |

== Results ==
Note: T1: Clubs from Thai League 1; T2: Clubs from Thai League 2; T3: Clubs from Thai League 3; T4: Clubs from Thai League 4; T5: Clubs from Thailand Amateur League.

=== Qualification round ===
There were 15 clubs from 2019 Thai League 2, 12 clubs from 2019 Thai League 3, 17 clubs from 2019 Thai League 4, and 28 clubs from 2019 Thailand Amateur League have signed to qualifying in 2019 Thai FA cup. This round had drawn on 14 March 2019.

| 27 March 2019 | Samut Prakan United (T5) | 0–8 | Hippo (T5) | Samut Prakan |
| 15:30 (UTC+7) | | Report | Nattawat Tanticharoen 10', 34' (pen.), 35', 68'; Teerawat Noulpak 16', 86'; Jirawat Kwanthong 77', 90' | Stadium: Lad Krabang 54 Stadium; Attendance: 250; Referee: Anusorn Saengnet; Assistant referees: Harut Heembenmad, Pradit Khukhankhet; Fourth official: Pratanrat Chaina |

| 27 March 2019 | Surat Thani City (T4) | 6–0 | Krua-Napat Ubon (T5) | Surat Thani |
| 15:30 (UTC+7) | Takueri Chekho 2'; Surapong Patrat 23'; Piyabut Srichaiwal 42'; Chinthan Jakthong 53', 73'; Tanawut Juntarat 90' | Report | | Stadium: Ban Song Municipality Stadium; Attendance: 200; Referee: Mahama Awae; Assistant referees: Chonsorn Nurach, Farid Buanak; Fourth official: Sombat Suwannarat |

| 27 March 2019 | Prachinburi City (T5) | 1–0 | Samut Songkhram (T4) | Prachinburi |
| 15:30 (UTC+7) | Chiraphong Boonaim 8' | Report | | Stadium: Prachinburi Provincial Stadium; Attendance: 100; Referee: Suchat Fangmala; Assistant referees: Pongsakorn Wisitsri, Suksan Thongkird; Fourth official: Naris Mungtermklang |

| 27 March 2019 | Songkhla Aslan TSU (T5) | 4–0 | Piyamit (T5) | Songkhla |
| 15:30 (UTC+7) | Tanakong Benya 34'; Fasee Tadeain 76', 83'; Panai Kongpraphan 89' | Report | | Stadium: Thaksin University Stadium; Attendance: 365; Referee: Pitsanu Choosri; Assistant referees: Pongsiri Choosri, Muhammadadega Lormae; Fourth official: Arthit Srinoi |

| 27 March 2019 | Rajpracha (T3) | 4–0 | Kantharalak United (T5) | Bangkok |
| 15:30 (UTC+7) | Jettaphat Jaiphakdee 30', 70'; Thanachat Chomchuen 56'; Wuttichat Yiamming 73' | Report | | Stadium: Thonburi Stadium; Attendance: 12; Referee: Komgrit Ponpasit; Assistant referees: Narong Chaitong, Nasri Tamat; Fourth official: Samrit Ritkaew |

| 27 March 2019 | Chiangrai City (T3) | 3–0 | Kanthararom United (T5) | Chiangrai |
| 15:30 (UTC+7) | Lenny 34'; Adul Namwong 61'; Chaiyahan Aunjit 75' (pen.) | Report | | Stadium: Mae Fah Luang University Stadium; Attendance: 55; Referee: Direk Ka-ard; Assistant referees: Uten Dansela, Teerapong Martip; Fourth official: Piyapong Thongkhain |

| 27 March 2019 | Real Old Man (T5) | 1–1 (5–6 p) | Krabi (T3) | Bangkok |
| 15:30 (UTC+7) | Supachai Maiwong 59' | Report | Arnon Petwat 28' | Stadium: Grakcu Sai Mai Stadium; Attendance: 150; Referee: Datsakorn Hokla; Assistant referees: Chanachai Promtat, Kittinan Sothonprapakorn; Fourth official: Krongsak Lhapim |
| | Penalties |
| | Akkarin Chaihiranroj (penalty scored); Phoochit Boonsuepsaksom (penalty scored); Nattawut Charoenporn (penalty scored); Narunyu Prawanna (penalty scored); Supachai Maiwong (penalty scored); Chananpat Chumchuay (penalty missed) | | (penalty scored) Ryohei Maeda; (penalty scored) Witoon Sukjit; (penalty scored) Arnon Petwat; (penalty scored) Surin Ra-ob; (penalty scored) Anuwat Phomsakul; (penalty scored) Raphael Manhães |

| 27 March 2019 | Khwaeng Mueang Wisetchaichan United (T5) | 1–2 | Phrae United (T3) | Angthong |
| 15:30 (UTC+7) | Sitthichai Maprasit 43' | Report | Jung Jung-yu 8'; Phakhawat Poonachang 20' | Stadium: Institute of Physical Education Angthong Stadium; Attendance: 250; Referee: Pongsira Phuangket; Assistant referees: Jomthong Vaewvab, Pornlarp Bamrungthai; Fourth official: Tawan Suriyawong |

| 27 March 2019 | Nakhon Si United (T3) | 2–1 | Ubon Kids City (T5) | Nakhon Si Thammarat |
| 15:30 (UTC+7) | Park Seon-hong 78'; Pongsakorn Klinsaowakon 90+5' | Report | Thanaphat Bunniyom 90+2' | Stadium: Nakhon Si Thammarat PAO. Stadium; Attendance: 100; Referee: Wichai Pannil; Assistant referees: Wisarut Dumthaklong, Hasadin Noorid; Fourth official: Sunya Satiddumrongkul |

| 27 March 2019 | Kalasin (T4) | 0–4 | MOF Customs United (T2) | Kalasin |
| 15:30 (UTC+7) | | Report | Sirichai Lamphuttha 5', 10'; Uroš Stojanov 53', 58' | Stadium: Kalasin Provincial Stadium; Attendance: 81; Referee: Wittaya Khamuatsap; Assistant referees: Vitsawa Nanchana, Chaiya Moolmanee; Fourth official: Somkhid Sarapim |

| 27 March 2019 | Siritham (T5) | 0–3 | Royal Thai Army (T3) | Narathiwat |
| 15:30 (UTC+7) | | Report | Anusorn Phrmprasit 16'; Kittikoon Pawong 39'; Alongkot Chaiyawiset 59' (pen.) | Stadium: Narathiwat PAO. Stadium; Attendance: 301; Referee: Nirut Suetrong; Assistant referees: Heesim Doloh, Kotchakorn Chumjai; Fourth official: Phairot Bunkamnoed |

| 27 March 2019 | See Kwae (T5) | 3–1 | Muangkan United (T3) | Nakhon Sawan |
| 15:30 (UTC+7) | Permyot Tokeaw 21', 30'; Phavit Duangkaco 90+3' (o.g.) | Report | Natthaphong Waharak 16' | Stadium: Nakhon Sawan Sport School Stadium; Attendance: 200; Referee: Suchin Khewsopa; Assistant referees: Supakit Bunnok, Ronnachai Raepaeng; Fourth official: Ekkachai Juiwong |

| 27 March 2019 | Kranuan (T5) | 3–0 | Surin City (T4) | Khon Kaen |
| 15:30 (UTC+7) | Chinnakorn Janphai 38'; Tadsawat Sriwilot 52', 85' | Report | | Stadium: Kaennakhon Witthayalai School Stadium; Attendance: 100; Referee: Thanet Intasen; Assistant referees: Thanakorn Chaikanya, Kritsada Promtaisong; Fourth official: Anan Kaewmuangkun |

| 27 March 2019 | Namphong United (T5) | 0–2 | Roi Et (T5) | Khon Kaen |
| 15:30 (UTC+7) | | Report | Chanathip Chompoowiset 47'; Saksit Pimsak 69' | Stadium: Nampong Suksa School Stadium; Attendance: 350; Referee: Rattanai Malison; Assistant referees: Manit Chaipoon, Kwanchai Jantayung; Fourth official: Vayu Ontama |

| 27 March 2019 | Sompho (T5) | 2–1 | Muangkrung (T5) | Yasothon |
| 15:30 (UTC+7) | Atipat Charoenbut 33'; Nonthanan Namkaew 46' | Report | Saksorn Pocha 86' | Stadium: Yasothon PAO. Stadium; Attendance: 134; Referee: Chalomwit Wongkanya; Assistant referees: Waratchanon Chomboon, Seksan Wongkam; Fourth official: Baworntat Duangkaew |

| 27 March 2019 | Muangchang United (T5) | 0–1 | North Vachiralai United (T5) | Surin |
| 15:30 (UTC+7) | | Report | Pat Thongpenkul 36' | Stadium: Sri Narong Stadium; Attendance: 105; Referee: Amnat Makklang; Assistant referees: Pakorn Dongjaroen, Pichai Yingyong; Fourth official: Sittichai Saramai |

| 27 March 2019 | Huai Thalaeng United (T4) | 1–0 | BTU United (T3) | Nakhon Ratchasima |
| 15:30 (UTC+7) | Aliou Seck 17' | Report | | Stadium: Suranaree University of Technology Stadium; Attendance: 38; Referee: Pisit Buntongpaeng; Assistant referees: Issara Kerdthai, Kittikun Soisri; Fourth official: Nattawut Nammuang |

| 27 March 2019 | Hatyai City (T4) | 1–2 | Siam (T4) | Songkhla |
| 15:30 (UTC+7) | Abdulhafis Nibu 28' | Report | Oscar Plape 36', 72' | Stadium: Southern Major City Stadium; Attendance: 125; Referee: Masuelan Makatung; Assistant referees: Somphong Khongthong, Mayuno Kuetae; Fourth official: Nattapon Nilwan |

| 27 March 2019 | Chainat United (T4) | 1–5 | Air Force United (T2) | Chainat |
| 15:30 (UTC+7) | Sumetee Srusuk 46' | Report | Greg Houla 34', 51', 82', 90+1'; Somsak Muksikapun 55' | Stadium: Nong Mamong Stadium; Attendance: 36; Referee: Krisda Luangyos; Assistant referees: Wirot Lokham, Anucha Pinamon; Fourth official: Natee Choosuwan |

| 27 March 2019 | Police Ladkrabang (T5) | 1–3 | Lamphun Warrior (T3) | Bangkok |
| 15:30 (UTC+7) | Varinthon Kengtarawut 17' | Report | Sirisak Rompothong 67', 87'; Pakphum Lato 80' | Stadium: 72-years Anniversary Stadium Bang Mot; Attendance: 25; Referee: Booncharoen Phochai; Assistant referees: Nattawit Noonmeesri, Anusit Sirimua; Fourth official: Ongart Saengthong |

| 27 March 2019 | Phitsanulok United (T5) | 0–4 | Police Tero (T2) | Phitsanulok |
| 17:00 (UTC+7) | | Report | Narong Jansawek 40'; Nattawut Munsuwan 48'; Nuttapon Sukchai 72'; Josimar 86' | Stadium: Pibulsongkram Rajabhat University Stadium; Attendance: 14; Referee: Tastarawut Khantavichai; Assistant referees: Worapong Prasartsri, Kanchit Nittayachart; Fourth official: Peerasan Krataithong |

| 27 March 2019 | Sisaket (T2) | 9–2 | Pattani (T4) | Sisaket |
| 18:00 (UTC+7) | Marc Landry Babo 9', 32', 37'; Willen 22', 41', 84'; Praphas Rattanadee 39'; Siwarut Pholhirun 56'; Dominic Adiyiah 67' | Report | Rushdan Katemmadee 85', 87' | Stadium: Sri Nakhon Lamduan Stadium; Attendance: 713; Referee: Anon Borisut; Assistant referees: Tapagorn Kamsing, Anupong Sangtopo; Fourth official: Anupong Duangsri |

| 27 March 2019 | Army United (T2) | 3–1 | Royal Thai Fleet (T4) | Bangkok |
| 18:00 (UTC+7) | Kanokphol Nuchrungrueang 5', 67'; Suradech Thongchai 45+2' | Report | Piansin Sha-in 15' | Stadium: Royal Thai Army Stadium; Attendance: 767; Referee: Prasert Arjpukdee; Assistant referees: Srisuwan Boonnum, Nuannid Donjangreed; Fourth official: Kriangsak Keattisongkram |

| 27 March 2019 | JL Chiangmai United (T2) | 18–0 | Sing Ubon (T5) | Chiangmai |
| 18:00 (UTC+7) | Soares 6', 28', 30', 41'; Erivelto 19', 22', 46', 77', 82'; Thanawich Thanasasipat 39'; Pongsakon Seerot 45'; Kansit Premthanakul 50', 75'; Anggello Machuca 59'; Hikaru Minegishi 62', 80'; Saran Srideth 72', 90' | Report | | Stadium: 700th Anniversary Stadium; Attendance: 429; Referee: Sarayut Jakngoen; Assistant referees: Pramote Boon-in, Woottipong Ketkam; Fourth official: Wachirapan Prasomphon |

| 27 March 2019 | Ubon United (T2) | 5–1 | Chanthaburi (T4) | Ubon Ratchathani |
| 18:00 (UTC+7) | Nantawat Suankaew 4', 48', 71'; Tanpisit Kukalamo 8', 60' | Report | Tirawut Thiwato 90+2' | Stadium: UMT Stadium; Attendance: 1,250; Referee: Seksan Phansri; Assistant referees: Rachan Dawangpa, Chaiya Sripak; Fourth official: Jirawit Phonkaew |

| 27 March 2019 | Kohkwang (T4) | 1–2 | Bankhai United (T4) | Chanthaburi |
| 18:00 (UTC+7) | Yannarit Sukcharoen 86' | Report | Tatree Seeha 12'; Chokchai Sukthed 77' | Stadium: Chanthaburi PAO. Stadium; Attendance: 250; Referee: Teerachai Jampa; Assistant referees: Wararit Suwanjira, Khanakorn Tiansawas; Fourth official: Sarawut Pramottayakul |

| 27 March 2019 | Singburi Bangrajun (T4) | 3–1 | Udon Thani (T2) | Singburi |
| 18:00 (UTC+7) | Wisarut Singhasanee 11'; Kongphob Kamasit 28'; Anar Babayev 90+4' | Report | Danuson Wijitpunya 68' | Stadium: Singburi Provincial Stadium; Attendance: 200; Referee: Wittaya Junejan; Assistant referees: Siwat Chaithong, Dumrongchai Chuangaroen; Fourth official: Ladda Yutiputi |

| 27 March 2019 | Nongbua Pitchaya (T2) | 7–0 | Burapha University (T5) | Nongbua Lamphu |
| 18:00 (UTC+7) | Apisit Khamwang 30', 68', 88'; Warayut Klomnak 41', 47'; Mongkol Namnuad 45'; Sittisak Sangsuwan 78' | Report | | Stadium: Nongbua Lamphu Provincial Stadium; Attendance: 611; Referee: Teetichai Nualjan; Assistant referees: Nissan Janthep, Jagkrit Kaenkaew; Fourth official: Pongpat Kaewbowon |

| 27 March 2019 | Phitsanulok (T4) | 0–3 | Rayong (T2) | Phitsanulok |
| 18:00 (UTC+7) | | Report | Wittawin Atthaprachyamueang 24'; Suriya Kanha 33'; Tiago Chulapa 90+1' | Stadium: Phitsanulok PAO. Stadium; Attendance: 421; Referee: Panumas Phansamo; Assistant referees: Apichat Prasasak, Kriangsak Pimsanit; Fourth official: Pathomphong Aiaocharoen |

| 27 March 2019 | Samut Sakhon (T2) | 8–0 | Torefun (T5) | Samut Sakhon |
| 18:00 (UTC+7) | Sarawut Thorarit 21', 52', 78'; Kraikitti In-utane 37'; Phisan Soawwadi 45' (pen.); Saharat Punmutchaya 45+1'; Decha Moohummard 54'; Apiwich Phulek 66' | Report | | Stadium: Samut Sakhon Provincial Stadium; Attendance: 248; Referee: Chaiwat Boonsong; Assistant referees: Poonsawat Samransuk, Kitisak Pikunngoen; Fourth official: Chayapol Laosuphan |

| 27 March 2019 | Navy (T2) | 9–0 | Muangkan Warrior (T5) | Chonburi |
| 18:00 (UTC+7) | Baek Seung-hyun 7', 17' (pen.), 66', 83'; Panuwat Meenapa 14'; Kanin Ketkaew 27'; Sirichai Phumpat 51'; Siwa Phommas 78'; Teerasak Phosrithong 86' | Report | | Stadium: Sattahip Navy Stadium; Attendance: 608; Referee: Boonsong Prachumrak; Assistant referees: Banpot Khunhong, Kantrakorn Ngaosri; Fourth official: Ekkachai Phetcham |

| 27 March 2019 | Khon Kaen (T2) | 0–2 | Muang Loei United (T4) | Khon Kaen |
| 18:00 (UTC+7) | | Report | Chawin Thareewachsri 47'; Pairat Rittisak 65' | Stadium: Khon Kaen PAO. Stadium; Attendance: 1,011; Referee: Sahapop Sriboonlue; Assistant referees: Narong Hansuk, Maitree Nuengkhammee; Fourth official: Yossakorn Pakdeesuwan |

| 27 March 2019 | Uttaradit (T4) | 7–1 | RMUT Rattanakosin (T5) | Uttaradit |
| 18:00 (UTC+7) | Nattapong Meemanee 27', 75', 88'; Aboubacar Sidick Diarra 45+1', 47', 79'; Kritnaphop Mekpatcharakul 59' | Report | Sarawut Sooksatan 82' | Stadium: Mon-mai Stadium; Attendance: 325; Referee: Sarawut Tawiya; Assistant referees: Thanet Jaithai, Chairat Thonglaima; Fourth official: Puwasak Sukkan |

| 27 March 2019 | BG Pathum United (T2) | 12–0 | Suwannaphum United (T5) | Pathum Thani |
| 19:00 (UTC+7) | Toti 24', 27', 55'; Rômulo 34', 35', 40' (pen.); Chatree Chimtalay 45+1', 69', 88'; Thammayut Rakbun 59'; Somroeng Hanchiaw 63', 80' | Report | | Stadium: Leo Stadium; Attendance: 549; Referee: Wicharn Klinthaworn; Assistant referees: Chaowalit Poonprasit, Supawan Hinthong; Fourth official: Winat Phophat |

| 27 March 2019 | Thai Honda (T2) | 2–2 (4–1 p) | Khon Kaen United (T3) | Bangkok |
| 19:00 (UTC+7) | Thawin Butsombat 20', 57' | Report; Highlight | Charin Boodhad 5'; Natan 23' | Stadium: 72nd Anniversary Stadium (Min Buri); Attendance: 720; Referee: Wichate Tainthong; Assistant referees: Komsan Kampan, Tussanai Sarobon; Fourth official: Dusit Aiamsakun |
| | Penalties |
| | Thawin Butsombat (penalty scored); Tanat Wongsuparak (penalty scored); Meedech Sarayuthpisai (penalty scored); Kento Nagasaki (penalty scored) | | (penalty missed) Douglas Cobo; (penalty missed) Charin Boodhad; (penalty scored) Suwit Paipromrat |

| 27 March 2019 | Nakhon Pathom United (T3) | 1–0 | Bangkok (T3) | Nakhon Pathom |
| 19:00 (UTC+7) | Ekkapoom Potharungroj 64' | Report | | Stadium: Nakhon Pathom Municipality Sport School Stadium; Attendance: 440; Referee: Satchukorn Saenchu; Assistant referees: Kittipon Meeporn, Adisai Pongnairat; Fourth official: Warakorn Suraporn |

=== First round ===
The first round would be featured by 36 clubs which were the winners of the qualification round and the new entries including 16 clubs from 2019 Thai League 1, 1 club from 2019 Thai League 2, 2 clubs from 2019 Thai League 3, 4 clubs from 2019 Thai League 4, and 5 clubs from 2019 Thailand Amateur League. This round had drawn on 19 April 2019.

| 1 May 2019 | Nakhon Si United (T3) | 4–1 | Sompho (T5) | Nakhon Si Thammarat |
| 15:30 (UTC+7) | Ampofo Samulabega 12' (pen.); Pitak Noikwa 22'; Sanphet Phichaikan 53'; Niras Bu-nga 60' | Report | Sarawut Naksiri 62' | Stadium: Nakhon Si Thammarat PAO. Stadium; Attendance: 100; Referee: Sulaiman Mamah; Assistant referees: Arris Madpunjor, Wisarut Dumtaklong; Fourth official: Matoha Sayo |

| 1 May 2019 | Prachinburi City (T5) | 0–1 | Sukhothai (T1) | Prachinburi |
| 15:30 (UTC+7) | | Report | Noraphat Kaikaew 18' | Stadium: Prachinburi Provincial Stadium; Attendance: 604; Referee: Panumas Phansamo; Assistant referees: Worapong Prasartsri, Waranyoo Chomgoson; Fourth official: Narong Chaitong |

| 1 May 2019 | Satun United (T4) | 1–2 (a.e.t.) | Nakhon Ratchasima Mazda (T1) | Satun |
| 15:30 (UTC+7) | Porncha Rodnakkaret 38' | Report | Bernard Henry 83' (pen.); Mathee Taweekulkarn 104' | Stadium: Satun PAO. Stadium; Attendance: 1,800; Referee: Sunya Satiddumrongkul; Assistant referees: Suriya Lee-intr, Udon Aneksak; Fourth official: Wichai Pannil |

| 1 May 2019 | Lamphun Warrior (T3) | 2–5 | Trat (T1) | Chiangmai |
| 15:30 (UTC+7) | Akarapong Pumwisat 19'; Boonkerd Chaiyasin 64' | Report | Sathaporn Daengsee 27'; Lonsana Doumbouya 50'; Adefolarin Durosinmi 56'; Sirisak Musbu-ngor 79'; Bireme Diouf 90+1' | Stadium: 700th Anniversary Stadium; Attendance: 119; Referee: Kotchapoom Meesridaecha; Assistant referees: Rachain Srichai, Kasama Loyma; Fourth official: Tanavit Prompet |

| 1 May 2019 | Kanjanapat (T5) | 3–3 (a.e.t.) (3–4 p) | Songkhla Aslan TSU (T5) | Bangkok |
| 15:30 (UTC+7) | Sompong Rodchompoo 44', 73'; Dumrongkiat Sungthong 68' | Report | Giattisak Songsawang 48'; Tanakong Benya 53', 70' | Stadium: Kasem Bundit University Rom Klao Campus Stadium; Attendance: 200; Referee: Worakit Panyoo; Assistant referees: Pradit Khukhankhet, Pratanrat Chaina; Fourth official: Jakkapan Rinsan |
| | Penalties |
| | Panuwat Masanthai (penalty missed); Dumrongkiat Sungthong (penalty scored); Krittanon Thanachotjaroenphon (penalty scored); Jaturong Doungkaew (penalty scored); Paradorn Chairon (penalty missed) | | (penalty missed) Tanakong Benya; (penalty scored) Thanthon Kongdee; (penalty scored) Giattisak Songsawang; (penalty scored) Phanitan Peuangkeaw; (penalty scored) Subadru Masong |

| 1 May 2019 | Roi Et (T5) | 2–2 (a.e.t.) (3–5 p) | Pluakdaeng United (T4) | Roi Et |
| 15:30 (UTC+7) | Chanathip Chompoowiset 42'; Sahapap Srenadee 46' | Report | Songkrod Wisetkaew 64'; Warut Trongkratok 90+6' | Stadium: Roi Et Provincial Stadium; Attendance: 558; Referee: Teeramate Pooprang; Assistant referees: Sirichai Raksapan, Akkaradech Jantharangsee; Fourth official: Warutsorn Sompan |
| | Penalties |
| | Chanathip Chompoowiset (penalty scored); Phattarawit Anowan (penalty scored); Saksit Pimsak (penalty scored); Chatchaphong Hagrasang (penalty missed) | | (penalty scored) Diogo Figueira; (penalty scored) Warut Trongkratok; (penalty scored) Caíque Ribeiro; (penalty scored) Sutee Noyphuk; (penalty scored) Lucas Sérgio Lopes Reis |

| 1 May 2019 | BSB Pakkert City (T5) | 0–6 | Lampang (T2) | Bangkok |
| 15:30 (UTC+7) | | Report | Masaya Jitozono 18'; Nattapoom Maya 41', 65', 73'; Rafael Coelho 69', 86' | Stadium: Grakcu Sai Mai Stadium; Referee: Anupong Duangsri; Assistant referees: Sassampan Kensakoo, Nissan Janthep; Fourth official: Warakorn Suraporn |

| 1 May 2019 | Nongbua Pitchaya (T2) | 3–0 | Kranuan (T5) | Nongbua Lamphu |
| 15:30 (UTC+7) | Warayut Klomnak 18'; Dennis Murillo 89', 90+4' | Report | | Stadium: Nongbua Lamphu Provincial Stadium; Attendance: 181; Referee: Peeratat Kittikanmetee; Assistant referees: Dumrongchai Chuangaroen, Watcharasak Intharak; Fourth official: Jirawit Phonkaew |

| 1 May 2019 | Bankhai United (T4) | 4–3 | See Kwae (T5) | Rayong |
| 15:30 (UTC+7) | Ekkapob Thippayapron 10' (o.g.); Chokchai Sukthed 45+2'; Ekue Andre Houma 51', 55' | Report | Natthaphong Khongthai 29', 76'; Permyot Tokeaw 61' | Stadium: Wai Krong Stadium; Attendance: 83; Referee: Sarawut Pramottayakul; Assistant referees: Pongsakorn Wisitsri, Samroeng Kamruang; Fourth official: Ponchanarusorn Sorajjapinyo |

| 1 May 2019 | Huai Thalaeng United (T4) | 0–0 (a.e.t.) (5–4 p) | Samut Prakan (T4) | Nakhon Ratchasima |
| 15:30 (UTC+7) | | Report | | Stadium: Suranaree University of Technology Stadium; Attendance: 162; Referee: Namporn Seemee; Assistant referees: Kaweeparp Buathong, Jatuwit Klompan; Fourth official: Trongkiat Jangjan |
| | Penalties |
| | Jiranuwat Mikhao (penalty scored); Naruebet Rodmuang (penalty missed); Aliou Seck (penalty scored); Kittisak Techakhobut (penalty scored); Chakrid Suayroop (penalty scored); Chatchai Nanthawichianrit (penalty scored) | | (penalty scored) Phakpoom Malirungrueng; (penalty scored) Songpol Tassanasomboon; (penalty missed) Techathorn Seehawong; (penalty scored) Pasawat Thamhiranchai; (penalty scored) Issarathron Punboonchu; (penalty missed) Dennis Borketey Bortieer |

| 1 May 2019 | Surat Thani City (T4) | 4–2 (a.e.t.) | Nakhon Pathom United (T3) | Surat Thani |
| 15:30 (UTC+7) | Takueri Chekho 32'; Pongdet Chaima 44'; Pedro Augusto Silva Rodrigues 97'; Piyabut Srichaiwal 119' | Report | Thanawat Montree 12'; Jhonatan Bernardo 86' | Stadium: Ban Song Municipality Stadium; Attendance: 100; Referee: Apichit Penjamras; Assistant referees: Anon Sottikumhang, Dusaifee Awae; Fourth official: Yod Dumhai |

| 1 May 2019 | Chiangmai Dream (T5) | 0–7 | Bangkok United (T1) | Chiangmai |
| 17:00 (UTC+7) | | Report; Highlight | Nelson Bonilla 12'; Everton 19'; Robson 23'; Guntapon Keereeleang 47', 51'; Alexander Sieghart 70', 84' | Stadium: Chiangmai Municipality Stadium; Attendance: 886; Referee: Teetichai Nualjan; Assistant referees: Tanin Reunjit, Teerapon Sunyapluem; Fourth official: Tudsanee Khuanpet |

| 1 May 2019 | Sisaket (T2) | 5–0 | B&B Rama II (T5) | Sisaket |
| 18:00 (UTC+7) | Pongsak Boonthot 3'; Dominic Adiyiah 19', 81'; Chatta Kokkaew 68'; Rangsiman Sruamprakum 88' | Report | | Stadium: Sri Nakhon Lamduan Stadium; Attendance: 810; Referee: Peerasan Krataithong; Assistant referees: Sila Jinnigorn, Nuannid Donjangreed; Fourth official: Wittaya Khamuatsap |

| 1 May 2019 | Wat Bot City (T4) | 0–2 | Suphanburi (T1) | Phitsanulok |
| 18:00 (UTC+7) | | Report | Kasidech Wettayawong 29'; Chananan Pombuppha 57' | Stadium: Phitsanulok PAO. Stadium; Attendance: 1,333; Referee: Chaireag Ngam-som; Assistant referees: Poonsawat Samransuk, Kanchit Nittayachart; Fourth official: Tastarawut Khantavichai |

| 1 May 2019 | PT Prachuap (T1) | 0–3 | SCG Muangthong United (T1) | Prachuap Khiri Khan |
| 18:00 (UTC+7) | | Report | Teerasil Dangda 29'; Adisak Kraisorn 84'; Heberty 86' | Stadium: Sam Ao Stadium; Attendance: 2,990; Referee: Atiwat Seelalo; Assistant referees: Srisuwan Boonnum, Sumate Peasiri; Fourth official: Piyapat Pisaree |

| 1 May 2019 | Singburi Bangrajun (T4) | 1–0 | Siam (T4) | Singburi |
| 18:00 (UTC+7) | Kongphob Kamasit 58' | Report | | Stadium: Singburi Provincial Stadium; Attendance: 100; Referee: Bongkotpech Tiansawang; Assistant referees: Adisorn Peungsathit, Ronnachai Raepaeng; Fourth official: Rattanan Thanasamban |

| 1 May 2019 | Samut Prakan City (T1) | 5–0 | North Vachiralai United (T5) | Samut Prakan |
| 18:00 (UTC+7) | Kyaw Ko Ko 4'; Baworn Tapla 53', 59', 68' (pen.), 89' | Report | | Stadium: Samut Prakan Stadium; Attendance: 595; Referee: Phairot Bunkamnoed; Assistant referees: Natthaphon Mala, Chaiya Sripak; Fourth official: Niwat Insa-ard |

| 1 May 2019 | Navy (T2) | 2–1 (a.e.t.) | Muang Loei United (T4) | Chonburi |
| 18:00 (UTC+7) | Baek Seung-hyun 60'; Sirichai Phumpat 112' | Report | Teerasak Phosrithong 64' (o.g.) | Stadium: Sattahip Navy Stadium; Attendance: 660; Referee: Paisan Bendem-alee; Assistant referees: Khomchalach Lekhawijit, Pongsira Phuangket; Fourth official: Chaiyos Sripak |

| 1 May 2019 | Ubon United (T2) | 2–1 | Songkhla (T5) | Ubon Ratchathani |
| 18:00 (UTC+7) | Nantawat Suankaew 19'; Tanpisit Kukalamo 32' | Report | Chanukorn Srirak 17' | Stadium: UMT Stadium; Attendance: 833; Referee: Ekkachai Phetcham; Assistant referees: Sarayut Sriampri, Anucha Pinamon; Fourth official: Patiyut Monthianart |

| 1 May 2019 | Krabi (T3) | 2–1 (a.e.t.) | Chiangmai (T1) | Krabi |
| 18:00 (UTC+7) | Aekkachai Nuikhao 66'; Sorbus Matheem 117' | Report | Chayanon Khamkean 37' | Stadium: Krabi Provincial Stadium; Attendance: 210; Referee: Noppadet Mangngam; Assistant referees: Binla Preeda, Phariwat Phoyoo; Fourth official: Manop Lempan |

| 1 May 2019 | Buriram United (T1) | 3–1 | PTT Rayong (T1) | Buriram |
| 18:00 (UTC+7) | Korrakot Wiriyaudomsiri 64'; Sasalak Haiprakhon 73'; Pedro Júnior 90' | Report | Saharat Kanyaroj 34' | Stadium: Chang Arena; Attendance: 9,192; Referee: Akom Charoensuk; Assistant referees: Pattarapong Kijsathit, Phubes Lekpha; Fourth official: Vitsavet Sangnakorn |

| 1 May 2019 | MOF Customs United (T2) | 3–1 | Phrae United (T3) | Samut Prakan |
| 18:00 (UTC+7) | Uroš Stojanov 5', 90+3'; Arsan Phengbanrai 55' (o.g.) | Report | Peerawis Ritsriboon 45' | Stadium: Lad Krabang 54 Stadium; Attendance: 500; Referee: Krisda Luangyos; Assistant referees: Maitree Nuengkhammee, Veeraporn Maophaeo; Fourth official: Pongpat Kaewbowon |

| 1 May 2019 | Thai Honda (T2) | 3–3 (a.e.t.) (5–3 p) | Chonburi (T1) | Bangkok |
| 18:00 (UTC+7) | Kento Nagasaki 38'; Thaned Benyapad 54'; Natpasut Malison 90+2' | Report | Sittichok Paso 8', 81'; Patrick Cruz 45+3' | Stadium: 72nd Anniversary Stadium (Min Buri); Attendance: 860; Referee: Sarayut Jakngoen; Assistant referees: Komsan Kampan, Wirot Lokham; Fourth official: Torphong Somsing |
| | Penalties |
| | Thawin Butsombat (penalty scored); Meedech Sarayuttapisai (penalty scored); Kento Nagasaki (penalty scored); Valdo (penalty scored); Tanat Wongsuparak (penalty scored) | | (penalty scored) Phanuphong Phonsa; (penalty scored) Kim Gyeong-min; (penalty scored) Saharat Sontisawat; (penalty missed) Worachit Kanitsribampen |

| 1 May 2019 | Air Force United (T2) | 3–3 (a.e.t.) (4–3 p) | JL Chiangmai United (T2) | Pathum Thani |
| 18:00 (UTC+7) | Kayne Vincent 2', 62'; Greg Houla 89' | Report | Erivelto 20', 24', 43' | Stadium: Thupatemi Stadium; Attendance: 852; Referee: Wichate Tainthong; Assistant referees: Natthakit Konfu, Atachai Kongkaew; Fourth official: Boonsong Prachumrak |
| | Penalties |
| | Kayne Vincent (penalty scored); Siripong Khongjaowpa (penalty scored); Patrick Flottmann (penalty missed); Methapon Monyai (penalty scored); Greg Houla (penalty scored) | | (penalty missed) Whoo Hyun; (penalty scored) Weerasak Gayasit; (penalty scored) Amnart Pamornprasert; (penalty scored) Erivelto; (penalty missed) Soares |

| 1 May 2019 | Army United (T2) | 2–2 (a.e.t.) (4–3 p) | Chiangrai City (T3) | Bangkok |
| 18:00 (UTC+7) | Kanokphol Nuchrungrueang 43' (pen.), 47' | Report | Lenny 62'; Pharadon Pattanapol 90' | Stadium: Royal Thai Army Stadium; Attendance: 451; Referee: Wittaya Junejan; Assistant referees: Chaowalit Poonprasit, Vichet Getkaew; Fourth official: Somsuk Poosomnuek |
| | Penalties |
| | Apisorn Phumchat (penalty scored); Watcharaphong Khongchuai (penalty missed); Suksan Mungpao (penalty scored); Jedsadakorn Kowngam (penalty missed); Wasan Samansin (penalty scored); Attaphon Kannoo (penalty scored) | | (penalty missed) Tora Charoensuk; (penalty scored) Chaiyahan Aunjit; (penalty missed) Nuttapong Promsen; (penalty scored) Narachai Intha-naka; (penalty scored) Phitsanusak Cheunbua-in; (penalty missed) Jetsada Supharit |

| 1 May 2019 | Port (T1) | 6–0 | Samut Sakhon (T2) | Bangkok |
| 18:00 (UTC+7) | Dragan Bošković 10', 64'; Sumanya Purisai 51', 79'; Sergio Suárez 60'; Bordin Phala 90+3' | Report | | Stadium: PAT Stadium; Attendance: 2,665; Referee: Anusorn Nookaew; Assistant referees: Rachan Dawangpa, Ruengsak Noopuek; Fourth official: Nantikan Buasa |

| 1 May 2019 | Chiangrai United (T1) | 2–1 | Uttaradit (T4) | Chiangrai |
| 18:00 (UTC+7) | Bill 52'; Anupap Onglaor 76' (o.g.) | Report | Nattapong Meemanee 88' | Stadium: Singha Stadium; Attendance: 1,016; Referee: Natee Choosuwan; Assistant referees: Narin Wongprapipak, Banpot Khunhong; Fourth official: Satchukorn Saenchu |

| 1 May 2019 | BG Pathum United (T2) | 6–2 | Rajpracha (T3) | Pathum Thani |
| 19:00 (UTC+7) | Chatree Chimtalay 21', 55' (pen.), 83'; Chalermsak Aukkee 40'; Yuki Bamba 52'; Nattachai Srisuwan 59' | Report | Chumpol Seekhiao 25' (pen.); Supawat Somsri 51' | Stadium: Leo Stadium; Attendance: 1,514; Referee: Winat Phophat; Assistant referees: Tussanai Sarobon, Thitibodi Rumnet; Fourth official: Prasert Arjpukdee |

| 1 May 2019 | Ratchaburi Mitr Phol (T1) | 4–0 | Chachoengsao Hi-Tek (T3) | Ratchaburi |
| 19:00 (UTC+7) | Sompong Soleb 8', 73'; Kang Soo-il 57', 82' | Report | | Stadium: Mitr Phol Stadium; Attendance: 1,120; Referee: Warintron Sassadee; Assistant referees: Apichit Nophuan, Uten Boonkan; Fourth official: Soraphong Krainate |

| 1 May 2019 | Chainat Hornbill (T1) | 2–0 | Royal Thai Army (T3) | Chainat |
| 19:00 (UTC+7) | Jeera Jarernsuk 22'; Narathon Pornjitkitichai 67' | Report | | Stadium: Khao Plong Stadium; Attendance: 435; Referee: Wiwat Jumpaoon; Assistant referees: Chotrawee Tongduang, Watthana Chonchanakul; Fourth official: Bodin Suriyakamun |

| 1 May 2019 | Rayong (T2) | 3–1 | Phuket City (T3) | Rayong |
| 19:00 (UTC+7) | Tiago Chulapa 69'; Ryo Matsumura 85', 90+2' | Report | Kittisak Bunmak 80' | Stadium: Rayong Provincial Stadium; Attendance: 218; Referee: Seksan Phansri; Assistant referees: Anupong Sangtopo, Vitsawa Nanchana; Fourth official: Dusit Aieamsakul |

| 1 May 2019 | Police Tero (T2) | 6–0 | Hippo (T5) | Bangkok |
| 19:00 (UTC+7) | Josimar 40'; Isaac Honny 62', 74', 81'; Santipharp Chunngom 71'; Kirati Keawsombat 80' | Report | | Stadium: Boonyachinda Stadium; Attendance: 551; Referee: Chaiwat Boonsong; Assistant referees: Yossapon Tongprom, Adisai Pongnairat; Fourth official: Thawatchai Sangsanit |

=== Second round ===
The second round would be featured by 32 clubs which were the winners of the first round including 12 clubs from T1, 12 clubs from T2, 2 clubs from T3, 5 clubs from T4, and 1 club from T5. This round had drawn on 30 May 2019.

| 19 June 2019 | Bankhai United (T4) | 1–1 (a.e.t.) (7–6 p) | Sisaket (T2) | Rayong |
| 15:30 (UTC+7) | Tanakrit Wonglikit 111' | Report | Dominic Adiyiah 92' | Stadium: Wai Krong Stadium; Attendance: 300; Referee: Wittaya Khamuatsap; Assistant referees: Tussanai Sarobon, Sila Jinnigorn; Fourth official: Prasert Arjpukdee |
| | Penalties |
| | Chokchai Sukthed (penalty scored); Tatree Seeha (penalty scored); Prawit Bureeted (penalty scored); Sarawut Sintupun (penalty scored); Jakkapong Somboon (penalty scored); Ekue Andre Houma (penalty scored); Wichit Tanee (penalty scored) | | (penalty scored) Willen; (penalty scored) Hiromichi Katano; (penalty scored) Dominic Adiyiah; (penalty scored) Mark Landry Babo; (penalty scored) Nirut Jamroensri; (penalty scored) Kanarin Thawornsak; (penalty missed) Siwarut Pholhirun |

| 19 June 2019 | Surat Thani City (T4) | 3–1 | Huai Thalaeng United (T4) | Surat Thani |
| 15:30 (UTC+7) | Atitthan Kongsarp 44', 75'; Suttipong Yatfai 67' | Report | Nopparat Auraikae 49' | Stadium: Ban Song Municipality Stadium; Attendance: 150; Referee: Mahama Awae; Assistant referees: Jirapan Yodput, Kachawit Hayachanaporn; Fourth official: Santi Raknum |

| 19 June 2019 | Nakhon Si United (T3) | 2–0 | Songkhla Aslan TSU (T5) | Nakhon Si Thammarat |
| 15:30 (UTC+7) | Phanuphan Chankaew 75'; Niras Bu-nga 89' | Report | | Stadium: Nakhon Si Thammarat PAO. Stadium; Attendance: 60; Referee: Sulaiman Mamah; Assistant referees: Preecha Lanui, Mongkhon Kaisin; Fourth official: Matoha Sayo |

| 19 June 2019 | Pluakdaeng United (T4) | 0–4 | Nakhon Ratchasima Mazda (T1) | Rayong |
| 15:30 (UTC+7) | | Report | Bernard Henry 34', 89'; Amadou Ouattara 77'; Akekanat Kongket 90+3' | Stadium: CK Stadium; Attendance: 400; Referee: Warintron Sassadee; Assistant referees: Kanchit Nittayachart, Suriya Lee-intr; Fourth official: Anuwat Feemuechang |

| 19 June 2019 | Krabi (T3) | 1–3 | Thai Honda (T2) | Krabi |
| 16:30 (UTC+7) | Arnon Petwat 69' | Report | Valdo 24'; Kriangkrai Chasang 45'; Wanit Chaisan 53' | Stadium: Krabi Provincial Stadium; Attendance: 130; Referee: Paisan Bendem-alee; Assistant referees: Siwat Chaithong, Jareon Nunboon; Fourth official: Phairot Bunkamnoed |

| 19 June 2019 | Ratchaburi Mitr Phol (T1) | 2–0 | Chainat Hornbill (T1) | Ratchaburi |
| 18:00 (UTC+7) | Dirceu 10'; Montree Promsawat 42' | Report | | Stadium: Mitr Phol Stadium; Attendance: 1,458; Referee: Wiwat Jumpaoon; Assistant referees: Rawut Nakarit, Pattarapong Kijsathit; Fourth official: Wittaya Junejan |

| 19 June 2019 | Air Force United (T2) | 0–8 | Chiangrai United (T1) | Pathum Thani |
| 18:00 (UTC+7) | | Report | Phitiwat Sukjitthammakul 13', 15'; William Henrique 20', 52'; Lee Yong-rae 26'; Piyaphon Phanichakul 39'; Atthawit Sukchuai 43'; Kritsana Kasemkulvilai 89' | Stadium: Thupatemi Stadium; Attendance: 543; Referee: Kotchapoom Meesridaecha; Assistant referees: Poonsawat Samransuk, Rachan Dawangpa; Fourth official: Ekkachai Phetcham |

| 19 June 2019 | Buriram United (T1) | 4–1 | Lampang (T2) | Buriram |
| 18:00 (UTC+7) | Pedro Júnior 33'; Korrakot Wiriyaudomsiri 56'; Supachai Jaided 65'; Watcharakorn Manoworn 90+3' | Report | Melvin de Leeuw 53' | Stadium: Chang Arena; Attendance: 7,684; Referee: Atiwat Seelalo; Assistant referees: Narin Wongprapipak, Kasama Loyma; Fourth official: Vitsavet Sangnakorn |

| 19 June 2019 | MOF Customs United (T2) | 2–1 | Ubon United (T2) | Samut Prakan |
| 18:00 (UTC+7) | Sirichai Lamphuttha 66', 90' | Report | Nantawat Suankaew 90+2' | Stadium: Lad Krabang 54 Stadium; Attendance: 480; Referee: Krisda Luangyos; Assistant referees: Watcharasak Intharak, Anucha Pinamon; Fourth official: Wichate Tainthong |

| 19 June 2019 | Singburi Bangrajun (T4) | 1–4 | SCG Muangthong United (T1) | Singburi |
| 18:00 (UTC+7) | Wisarut Singhasanee 46' | Report | Mario Gjurovski 26'; Korrawit Tasa 29', 36'; Heberty 56' | Stadium: Singburi Provincial Stadium; Attendance: 2,449; Referee: Noppadet Mangngam; Assistant referees: Worapong Prasartsri, Sumate Peasiri; Fourth official: Chaireag Ngam-som |

| 19 June 2019 | Navy (T2) | 0–5 | Trat (T1) | Chonburi |
| 19:00 (UTC+7) | | Report | Nukoolkit Krutyai 2'; Bireme Diouf 36', 40', 59'; Adefolarin Durosinmi 90' | Stadium: Sattahip Navy Stadium; Attendance: 718; Referee: Niwat Insa-ard; Assistant referees: Srisuwan Boonnum, Ruangsak Noopuek; Fourth official: Boonsong Prachumrak |

| 19 June 2019 | BG Pathum United (T2) | 0–1 | Bangkok United (T1) | Pathum Thani |
| 19:00 (UTC+7) | | Report; Highlight | Robson 39' | Stadium: Leo Stadium; Attendance: 2,226; Referee: Sarayut Jakngoen; Assistant referees: Komsan Kampan, Phubes Lekpha; Fourth official: Sivakorn Pu-udom |

| 19 June 2019 | Samut Prakan City (T1) | 4–2 (a.e.t.) | Army United (T2) | Samut Prakan |
| 19:00 (UTC+7) | Kyaw Ko Ko 66'; Teeraphol Yoryoei 105+1'; Baworn Tapla 110'; Phanuwit Jitsanoh 115' | Report | Jedsadakorn Kowngam 90'; Mongkol Tossakrai 97' | Stadium: Samut Prakan Stadium; Attendance: 390; Referee: Pichit Na Suwan; Assistant referees: Binla Preeda, Phariwat Phoyoo; Fourth official: Dusit Aieamsakul |

| 19 June 2019 | Rayong (T2) | 2–0 (a.e.t.) | Suphanburi (T1) | Rayong |
| 19:00 (UTC+7) | Ryo Matsumura 98'; Tiago Chulapa 119' | Report | | Stadium: Rayong Provincial Stadium; Attendance: 436; Referee: Pathomphong Aiaocharoen; Assistant referees: Rachain Srichai, Uten Boonkan; Fourth official: Pongpat Kaewbowon |

| 19 June 2019 | Police Tero (T2) | 3–1 | Nongbua Pitchaya (T2) | Bangkok |
| 19:00 (UTC+7) | Kwon Dae-hee 7'; Kirati Keawsombat 53', 57' | Report | Warayut Klomnak 55' | Stadium: Boonyachinda Stadium; Attendance: 385; Referee: Peeratat Kittikanmetee; Assistant referees: Vitsawa Nanchana, Pongsira Phuangket; Fourth official: Anupong Duangsri |

| 19 June 2019 | Port (T1) | 4–1 | Sukhothai (T1) | Bangkok |
| 19:00 (UTC+7) | Pakorn Prempak 8', 34'; Bordin Phala 45+2'; David Rochela 48' | Report | Noraphat Kaikaew 76' | Stadium: PAT Stadium; Attendance: 2,448; Referee: Natee Choosuwan; Assistant referees: Tanate Chuchuen, Apichit Nophuan; Fourth official: Chaiwat Boonsong |

=== Third round ===
The third round would be featured by 16 clubs which were the winners of the second round including 9 clubs from T1, 4 clubs from T2, 1 club from T3, and 2 clubs from T4. This round had drawn on 21 June 2019.

| 17 July 2019 | Bankhai United (T4) | 1–4 | Trat (T1) | Rayong |
| 15:30 (UTC+7) | Tatree Seeha 90+2' | Report; Highlight | Chalermsuk Kaewsuktae 56'; Lonsana Doumbouya 75', 89'; Weerapan Thongnak 83' (o.g.) | Stadium: Wai Krong Stadium; Attendance: 450; Referee: Teetichai Nualjan; Assistant referees: Suriya Lee-intr, Chaowalit Poonprasit; Fourth official: Wichate Tainthong |

| 17 July 2019 | Nakhon Si United (T3) | 0–2 | Ratchaburi Mitr Phol (T1) | Nakhon Si Thammarat |
| 15:30 (UTC+7) | | Report; Highlight | Philip Roller 89' (pen.); Steeven Langil 90+2' | Stadium: Nakhon Si Thammarat PAO. Stadium; Attendance: 1,200; Referee: Atiwat Seelalo; Assistant referees: Komsan Kampan, Yossapon Tongprom; Fourth official: Vitsavet Sangnakorn |

| 17 July 2019 | Buriram United (T1) | 5–0 | Rayong (T2) | Buriram |
| 18:00 (UTC+7) | Nacer Barazite 37', 45+2', 49'; Sasalak Haiprakhon 58'; Supachok Sarachat 61' | Report; Highlight | | Stadium: Chang Arena; Attendance: 8,183; Referee: Chaireag Ngam-som; Assistant referees: Narin Wongprapipak, Binla Preeda; Fourth official: Jirawit Phonkaew |

| 17 July 2019 | Nakhon Ratchasima Mazda (T1) | 4–0 | Surat Thani City (T4) | Nakhon Ratchasima |
| 18:00 (UTC+7) | Decha Srangdee 49'; Amadou Ouattara 51'; Bernard Henry 65' (pen.); Attapong Nooprom 77' | Report; Highlight | | Stadium: 80th Birthday Stadium; Attendance: 1,975; Referee: Phairot Bunkamnoed; Assistant referees: Apichit Nophuan, Sumate Peasiri; Fourth official: Wittaya Junejan |

| 17 July 2019 | MOF Customs United (T2) | 1–4 | Chiangrai United (T1) | Samut Prakan |
| 18:00 (UTC+7) | Sirichai Lamphuttha 14' | Report; Highlight | Bill 20' (pen.), 25', 69' (pen.); Chaiyawat Buran 29' | Stadium: Lad Krabang 54 Stadium; Attendance: 580; Referee: Anusorn Nookaew; Assistant referees: Pattarapong Kusathit, Kitisak Pikunngoen; Fourth official: Suwat Wongsuwan |

| 17 July 2019 | Thai Honda (T2) | 3–2 | Samut Prakan City (T1) | Bangkok |
| 18:00 (UTC+7) | Thawin Butsombat 40' (pen.); Valdo 63', 72' | Report; Highlight | Kyaw Ko Ko 53', 71' | Stadium: 72nd Anniversary Stadium (Min Buri); Attendance: 991; Referee: Torphong Somsing; Assistant referees: Phubes Lekpha, Watthana Chonchanakul; Fourth official: Niwat Insa-ard |

| 17 July 2019 | Bangkok United (T1) | 3–1 | Police Tero (T2) | Pathum Thani |
| 19:00 (UTC+7) | Jaycee John 15' (pen.), 55', 69' | Report; Highlight | Adisak Srikampang 31' | Stadium: Thammasat Stadium; Attendance: 1,596; Referee: Kotchapoom Meesridaecha; Assistant referees: Rawut Nakarit, Wirot Lokham; Fourth official: Sahapop Sriboonlue |

| 17 July 2019 | SCG Muangthong United (T1) | 0–2 | Port (T1) | Nonthaburi |
| 19:00 (UTC+7) | | Report; Highlight | Teerasil Dangda 74' (o.g.); Rolando Blackburn 80' | Stadium: SCG Stadium; Attendance: 4,834; Referee: Wiwat Jumpaoon; Assistant referees: Rachain Srichai, Tanin Reunjit; Fourth official: Sarayut Jakngoen |

=== Quarter-finals ===
The quarter-finals round would be featured by 8 clubs which were the winners of the third round including 7 clubs from T1 and 1 club from T2. This round had drawn on 19 July 2019.

| 7 August 2019 | Trat (T1) | 2–2 (a.e.t.) (4–5 p) | Buriram United (T1) | Trat |
| 18:00 (UTC+7) | Bireme Diouf 44'; Wongsakorn Chaikultewin 51' | Report; Highlight | Nacer Barazite 72'; Andrés Túñez 85' | Stadium: Trat Provincial Stadium; Attendance: 4,559; Referee: Seksan Phansri; Assistant referees: Watthana Chonchanakul, Kitisak Pikunngoen; Fourth official: Atiwat Seelalo |
| | Penalties |
| | Chalermsuk Kaewsuktae (penalty missed); Wongsakorn Chaikultewin (penalty scored); Sathaporn Daengsee (penalty scored); Adefolarin Durosinmi (penalty scored); Lonsana Doumbouya (penalty scored); Napat Thamrongsupakorn (penalty missed) | | (penalty scored) Andrés Túñez; (penalty scored) Supachai Jaided; (penalty scored) Suphanat Mueanta; (penalty missed) Sasalak Haiprakhon; (penalty scored) Supachok Sarachat; (penalty scored) Ratthanakorn Maikami |

| 7 August 2019 | Nakhon Ratchasima Mazda (T1) | 0–1 (a.e.t.) | Bangkok United (T1) | Nakhon Ratchasima |
| 18:00 (UTC+7) | | Report; Highlight | Vander 114' | Stadium: 80th Birthday Stadium; Attendance: 3,237; Referee: Sivakorn Pu-udom; Assistant referees: Apichit Nophuan, Narin Wongprapipak; Fourth official: Wichate Tainthong |

| 7 August 2019 | Ratchaburi Mitr Phol (T1) | 3–1 | Thai Honda (T2) | Ratchaburi |
| 19:00 (UTC+7) | Yoo Jun-soo 37', 90+4'; Philip Roller 57' | Report; Highlight | Sihanart Sutisuk 68' | Stadium: Mitr Phol Stadium; Attendance: 2,714; Referee: Anupong Duangsri; Assistant referees: Tanate Chuchuen, Worapong Prasartsri; Fourth official: Ekkachai Phetcham |

| 7 August 2019 | Port (T1) | 3–2 | Chiangrai United (T1) | Bangkok |
| 19:00 (UTC+7) | Tanasak Srisai 15' (o.g.); Sumanya Purisai 19'; Sergio Suárez 51' | Report; Highlight | Bill 53', 77' (pen.) | Stadium: PAT Stadium; Attendance: 3,473; Referee: Chaireag Ngam-som; Assistant referees: Poonsawat Samransuk, Chaowalit Poonprasit; Fourth official: Winat Phophat |

=== Semi-finals ===
The semi-finals round would be featured by 4 clubs which were the winners of the quarter-finals round, all were clubs from T1. This round had drawn on 20 August 2019.

| 18 September 2019 | Ratchaburi Mitr Phol (T1) | 2–1 | Buriram United (T1) | Bangkok |
| 19:00 (UTC+7) | Amin Nazari 45+1'; Yannick Boli 73' | Report; Highlight | Pansa Hemviboon 59' | Stadium: 72nd Anniversary Stadium (Min Buri); Attendance: 2,252; Referee: Wiwat Jumpaoon; Assistant referees: Tanate Chuchuen, Ruangsak Nuphuek; Fourth official: Vitsavet Sangnakorn |

| 18 September 2019 | Bangkok United (T1) | 0–0 (a.e.t.) (4–5 p) | Port (T1) | Bangkok |
| 19:00 (UTC+7) | | Report; Highlight | | Stadium: Royal Thai Army Stadium; Attendance: 5,323; Referee: Chaireag Ngam-som; Assistant referees: Poonsawat Samransuk, Phubes Lekpha; Fourth official: Songkran Bunmeekiart |
| | Penalties |
| | Vander (penalty scored); Everton (penalty missed); Manuel Bihr (penalty scored); Anon Amornlerdsak (penalty scored); Sanrawat Dechmitr (penalty scored); Guntapon Keereeleang (penalty missed) | | (penalty scored) Rolando Blackburn; (penalty scored) David Rochela; (penalty missed) Elias Dolah; (penalty scored) Go Seul-ki; (penalty scored) Tanaboon Kesarat; (penalty scored) Nitipong Selanon |

=== Final ===
The final round would be featured by 2 clubs which were the winners of the semi-finals round, both were clubs from T1. This round was played on 2 November 2019 at Leo Stadium in Thanyaburi, Pathum Thani.

| 2 November 2019 | Ratchaburi Mitr Phol (T1) | 0–1 | Port (T1) | Pathum Thani |
| 19:00 (UTC+7) | | Report; Highlight | Sergio Suárez 48' | Stadium: Leo Stadium; Attendance: 6,848; Referee: Chaireag Ngam-som; Assistant referees: Poonsawat Samransuk, Worapong Prasartsri; Fourth official: Wiwat Jumpa-on |

== Top goalscorers ==
| Rank | Player | Club | Goals |
|---|---|---|---|
| 1 | (Brazil) Erivelto | JL Chiangmai United | 8 |
| 2 | (Thailand) Chatree Chimtalay | BG Pathum United | 6 |
| 2 | (Brazil) Bill | Chiangrai United | 6 |
| 4 | (France) Greg Houla | Air Force United | 5 |
| 4 | (Thailand) Sirichai Lamphuttha | MOF Customs United | 5 |
| 4 | (South Korea) Baek Seung-hyun | Navy | 5 |
| 4 | (Thailand) Baworn Tapla | Samut Prakan City | 5 |
| 4 | (Ivory Coast) Bireme Diouf | Trat | 5 |
| 4 | (Thailand) Nantawat Suankaew | Ubon United | 5 |
| 10 | (Thailand) Kanokphol Nuchrungrueang | Army United | 4 |
| 10 | (Netherlands) Nacer Barazite | Buriram United | 4 |
| 10 | (Thailand) Nattawat Tanticharoen | Hippo | 4 |
| 10 | (Brazil) Soares | JL Chiangmai United | 4 |
| 10 | (Serbia) Uroš Stojanov | MOF Customs United | 4 |
| 10 | (Ivory Coast) Bernard Doumbia | Nakhon Ratchasima Mazda | 4 |
| 10 | (Thailand) Warayut Klomnak | Nongbua Pitchaya | 4 |
| 10 | (Myanmar) Kyaw Ko Ko | Samut Prakan City | 4 |
| 10 | (Ghana) Dominic Adiyiah | Sisaket | 4 |
| 10 | (Thailand) Nattapong Meemanee | Uttaradit | 4 |
