= 2018 Thai FA Cup =

Chang FA Cup

Tournament details
- Country: Thailand
- Dates: 4 April 2018 – 27 October 2018
- Teams: 92

Final positions
- Champions: Chiangrai United (2nd title)
- Runners-up: Buriram United

Tournament statistics
- Matches played: 91
- Goals scored: 311 (3.42 per match)
- Top goal scorer(s): Bill (8 goals)

Awards
- Best player: Bill

The 2018 Thai FA Cup is the 25th season of a Thailand's knockout football competition. It was sponsored by Chang, and known as the Chang FA Cup (Thai: ช้าง เอฟเอคัพ) for sponsorship purposes. The tournament is organized by the Football Association of Thailand. 92 clubs were accepted into the tournament, and it began with the qualification round on 4 April 2018, and concluded with the final on 27 October 2018. The winner would have qualified for the 2019 AFC Champions League preliminary round 2 and the 2019 Thailand Champions Cup.

== Calendar ==
Round	Date	Matches	Clubs	New entries this round
Qualification round	4 April 2018	28	8 + 8 + 19 + 21 → 28	8 2018 Thai League 2; 8 2018 Thai League 3; 19 2018 Thai League 4; 21 Thailand Amateur League
First round	27 June 2018	32	28 + 18 + 5 + 3 + 3 + 7 → 32	18 2018 Thai League 1; 5 2018 Thai League 2; 3 2018 Thai League 3; 3 2018 Thai League 4; 7 Thailand Amateur League
Second round	4 July 2018	16	32 → 16	
Third round	25 July 2018	8	16 → 8	
Quarter-finals	1 August 2018	4	8 → 4	
Semi-finals	26 September 2018	2	4 → 2	
Final	27 October 2018	1	2 → Champions	
Total				92 clubs

== Results ==
Note: T1: Clubs from Thai League 1; T2: Clubs from Thai League 2; T3: Clubs from Thai League 3; T4: Clubs from Thai League 4; T5: Clubs from Thailand Amateur League.

=== Qualification round ===
The qualification round will be featured by fifty-six clubs; including eight clubs from T2, eight clubs from T3, nineteen clubs from T4, and twenty-one clubs from T5. Qualification round had drawn on 21 March 2018 by FA Thailand.

4 April 2018	Muang Loei United (T4)	1–0	Rajpracha (T3)	Loei
15:30 (UTC+7)	Chawin Thirawatsri 60'	Report		Stadium: Wang Saphung District Stadium; Attendance: 315; Referee: Watchara Sitthirak

4 April 2018	Surin City (T4)	1–2	Nakhon Mae Sot United (T4)	Surin
15:30 (UTC+7)	Suriyo Chao-na 59'	Report; Half-time Hilight; Full-time Hilight	Nipon Phanprom 6'; Sorot Puangkhamma 79'	Stadium: Sri Narong Stadium; Attendance: 162; Referee: Suthat Ranob

4 April 2018	Nakhon Ratchasima Huai Thalaeng United (T4)	3–4	Pualand (T5)	Nakhon Ratchasima
15:30 (UTC+7)	Naruebet Rodmuang 27', 71'; Thitipong Thongkham 90+3'	Report	Nataporn Srima 32', 34'; Thamonphat Limkunlikhid 66'; Watcharapong Kamthep 90'	Stadium: Suranaree University of Technology Stadium; Attendance: 145; Referee: Bundit Phasuksom

4 April 2018	Samutsongkhram (T4)	8–0	Muangchang United (T5)	Samut Songkhram
15:30 (UTC+7)	Woraphot Somsang 9', 77'; Pichapop Jermkhunthod 52'; Wongpakorn Jaroentaweesuk 53'; Pawit Duangkaew 58'; Mirzajani Tafreshi Nima 76', 90'; Thiranan Srirat 90+1'	Report		Stadium: Samut Songkhram PAO. Stadium; Attendance: 96; Referee: Sarawut Pramodhyakul

4 April 2018	Kolok United (T5)	0–2	Chiangmai (T2)	Narathiwat
15:30 (UTC+7)		Report	Hiziel Souza Soares 24'; Ronnachai Rangsiyo 56'	Stadium: Maharaj Stadium; Attendance: 4 Referee: Pisan Bentem-ahlee

4 April 2018	BGC (T4)	2–1	Ayutthaya United (T3)	Pathum Thani
15:30 (UTC+7)	Samroeng Hanchiaw 48'; Rangsiman Sruamprakum 63'	Report; Hilight	Tomohiro Onodera 74'	Stadium: North Bangkok University Stadium (Rangsit); Attendance: 195; Referee: Sukhon Boonplod

4 April 2018	Petpittayakom Alumni (T5)	1–0	Hatyai City (T4)	Phetchabun
15:30 (UTC+7)	Thanakorn Homta 3'	Report		Stadium: Phetchabun province stadium Attendance: 200; Referee: Phuwasak Sukkhaphan

4 April 2018	Muangkan Warrior (T5)	0–11	Army United (T2)	Kanchanaburi
15:30 (UTC+7)		Report	Anmar Almubaraki 5', 18'; Chutiphan Nopnop 14'; Erivelto 18', 25', 37', 39'; Suradet Thongchai 27', 55'; Diego Lima 34', 50'	Stadium: Kleeb Bua Stadium; Attendance: 30; Referee: Nuengchai Saibiang

4 April 2018	Traill International school (T5)	1–6	Nonthaburi (T4)	Nonthaburi
15:30 (UTC+7)	Sarit Jitprot 78' (o.g.); Ukrit Peekaew 90+2'	Report	Piranan Kerdsorn 9', 7'; Satid Sriutai 31'; Anucha Thakapol 39'; Attapol Boonkun 69'	Stadium: Pithak Nonthakhet Stadium; Attendance: 150; Referee: Seksan Phansri

4 April 2018	Sakultala WS (T5)	2–2 (a.e.t.) (2–4 p)	Tamuang (T5)	Ayutthaya
15:30 (UTC+7)	Ekkawat Ponlawatpaisan 38', 73'	Report	Witsanu Paiteun 19'; Nukan Nguanpan 90+4'	Stadium: Senabordee Stadium; Attendance: 54; Referee: Tossapornsil Sittisena
	Penalties
	Teerayut Angmajcha (penalty scored); Korakot Tumnu (penalty missed); Atthanop Boribunjatuporn (penalty scored); Krissana Panmongkol (penalty missed)		(penalty scored) Atipong Somsri; (penalty scored) Kanapot Kheao-im; (penalty scored) Komin Pladdingdaeng; (penalty missed) Peerapong Suphap; (penalty scored) Tarapong Naruedeesri-u-tai

4 April 2018	Bangkok (T3)	3–2	Pluak Daeng Rayong United (T4)	Nonthaburi
15:30 (UTC+7)	Sakunchai Saengthopho 53'; Poramet Arjvirai 60', 66'	Report; Hilight	Warut Trongkratok 41'; Worawut Jantapho 83'	Stadium: SCG Stadium 2 Attendance: 207; Referee: Thitibodee Rubnet

4 April 2018	Nan (T4)	0–1	Kohkwang Subdistrict Municipality (T5)	Nan
15:30 (UTC+7)		Report; Hilight	Danai Wechwitee 2'	Stadium: Nan PAO. Stadium; Attendance: 110; Referee: Phanupol Mingklin

4 April 2018	Ubon Kids City (T5)	1–0	Jumpasri United (T5)	Ubon Ratchathani
15:30 (UTC+7)	Kittisak Laosawat 90+3'	Report		Stadium: Ubon Ratchathani University Stadium; Attendance: 204; Referee: Wittaya Suthison

4 April 2018	Rajamangala University Of Technology Rattanakosin (T5)	0–0 (a.e.t.) (5–3 p)	Surindra (T5)	Bangkok
15:30 (UTC+7)		Report		Stadium: Thonburi Stadium; Attendance: 42; Referee: Saksit Ngakhom
	Penalties
	Pakorn Tep-opas (penalty scored); Jirayu Chaichanarukkul (penalty scored); Thanawat Yimlamai (penalty scored); Nonthaphut Pan-aimthon (penalty scored); Aphisit Matthaen (penalty scored)		(penalty missed) Kroekchai Khaomun; (penalty scored) Choksongpon Yodrak; (penalty scored) Kunakorn Saoyod; (penalty scored) Palangkoor Sankla

4 April 2018	Archa Knight (T5)	2–5	Bankhai United (T4)	Pathum Thani
15:30 (UTC+7)	Suraphong Mungmart 75'; Teerapong Sopa 90+2'	Report; Half-time Hilight; Full-time Hilight	Yuttapichai Samanachangphueak 20' (23), pen.' (37); Watta Aeimsang 63', 89'	Stadium: Grakcu Sai Mai United training field Attendance: 100; Referee: Nattaphak Sawasdee

4 April 2018	Kamphaengphet (T3)	0–0 (a.e.t.) (1–4 p)	Nongbua Pitchaya (T2)	Kamphaengphet
15:30 (UTC+7)		Report; Hilight		Stadium: Cha Kung Rao Stadium; Attendance: 370; Referee: Jirayut Kasipol
	Penalties
	Jimmy Shola (penalty scored); Masayuki Kudo (penalty missed); Nukrob Khummake (penalty missed)		(penalty scored) Apisit Khamwang; (penalty scored) Weerayut Sriwichai; (penalty scored) Gabriel Davis; (penalty scored) Goran Jerković

4 April 2018	Surin Sugar United (T5)	1–3	Chainat United (T4)	Surin
15:30 (UTC+7)	Satawat Chaidid 78'	Report	Sumatee Sisuk 17'; Wachirawit Saikaew 48'; Phongphiphat Phimchainoi 54'	Stadium: Rajamangala University of Technology (Surin Campus) Isan stadium Attendance: 100; Referee: Warakorn Suraporn

4 April 2018	Royal Thai Army (T3)	2–2 (a.e.t.) (4–2 p)	MOF Customs United (T3)	Bangkok
15:30 (UTC+7)	Tewa Pan-in 12'; Nattapong Kumnate 60'	Report	Hwang In-seong 68' (pen.), 90+4'	Stadium: Thai Army Sports Stadium; Attendance: 152; Referee: Yuttana Nima
	Penalties
	Nattapong Kumnate (penalty scored); Noppadon Kasaen (penalty scored); Eaksatha Thanyakam (penalty scored); Phubet Wangyenniyom (penalty scored)		(penalty scored) Hwang In-seong; (penalty missed) Sarawut Inpoung; (penalty missed) Atthaphon Rueangkhajohn; (penalty missed) Kunaporn Srisom

4 April 2018	Singburi Bangrajun (T4)	0–2	Sisaket (T2)	Singburi
18:00 (UTC+7)		Report; Hilight	Tatree Seeha 37'; Rattasak Weing-in 90+2'	Stadium: Singburi Provincial Stadium; Attendance: 238; Referee: Bongkotpetch Tiansawang

4 April 2018	Phatthalung (T4)	4–5	Naresuan (T5)	Phatthalung
18:00 (UTC+7)	Jakkrawut Tirachamnong 18' (pen.), 39'; Cherif Mamy 63'; Obamoe Daniel 65'	Report; Half-time Hilight; Full-time Hilight	Atikan Emsa-Ard 15'; Somlak Rassamee 23'; Nuttapop Saranrom 69'; Chennarong Wongnoi 79' (pen.); Nattapong meemanee 80'	Stadium: Phatthalung Provincial Stadium; Attendance: 122; Referee: Wichai Pannil

4 April 2018	Sakaeo (T3)	2–1	Dome (T4)	Sakaeo
18:00 (UTC+7)	Rewat Khamwiengchan 36'; Tuangsit Soimee 70'	Report	Pitchakorn Jinyong 25'	Stadium: Sakaeo PAO. Stadium; Attendance: 200; Referee: Peerasan Krataithong

4 April 2018	Srivichai (T5)	0–4	Uttaradit (T4)	Surat Thani
18:00 (UTC+7)		Report; Hilight	Kobenan Leon N'Guatta 80'; Patipat Kamsat 88'; Arboubacar Sanogo Junior 90+3'; Pitsanu Ngamsa-nguan 90+4'	Stadium: Surat Thani Province Stadium; Attendance: 1,000; Referee: Sombat Suwanrat

4 April 2018	Khonkaen (T2)	3–0	Chachoengsao Hi-Tek (T3)	Khonkaen
18:00 (UTC+7)	Thotsaphon Yotchan 39' (pen.); Chatchai Jiakklang 63'; Thanaphat Phutnok 90+2'	Report; Hilight		Stadium: Khonkaen PAO. Stadium; Attendance: 1,646; Referee: Manas Pimon

4 April 2018	Phitsanulok (T4)	1–0	Taweewattana (T5)	Phitsanulok
18:00 (UTC+7)	Anucha Phantong 78'	Report; Half-time Hilight; Full-time Hilight		Stadium: Phitsanulok PAO. Stadium; Attendance: 362; Referee: Nattawut Tesmak

4 April 2018	Chanthaburi (T4)	2–2 (a.e.t.) (3–5 p)	Udon Thani (T2)	Chanthaburi
18:00 (UTC+7)	Saknarin Pinjaikul 14'; Chiraphong Boon-aim 19'	Report; Half-time Hilight; Full-time Hilight	Phakphum Srichai 55'; Reungyos Janchaichit 81'	Stadium: Chanthaburi PAO. Stadium; Attendance: 425; Referee: U-sen Yala
	Penalties
	Isariya Marom (penalty scored); Reungyos Janchaichit (penalty scored); Phakphum Srichai (penalty scored); Sundy Wongderree (penalty scored); Jetsada Badcharee (penalty scored)		(penalty scored) Chainarong Samuttha; (penalty missed) Tripop Jaroensheep; (penalty scored) Enoch Ozor; (penalty scored) Tanarong Turian

4 April 2018	Rayong (T2)	3–0	Kanjanapat (T5)	Rayong
19:00 (UTC+7)	Nirun Chaokhao 21'; Krissana Nontharak 57'; Sirisak Fufung 70'	Report; Half-time Hilight; Full-time Hilight		Stadium: Rayong Provincial Stadium; Attendance: 387; Referee: Kotchapum Meesridecha

4 April 2018	Khonkaen United (T4)	0–1	NBN Kanthararom United (T5)	Khonkaen
19:00 (UTC+7)		Report; Hilight	Chaiyot Sae-tae 17'	Stadium: Khonkaen PAO. Stadium; Attendance: 1,729; Referee: Sitthisak Kammong

4 April 2018	Lampang (T2)	3–1	Dontan PCCM (T5)	Lampang
19:00 (UTC+7)	Melvin de Leeuw 58'; Pedro Alves 75', 90+3'	Report; Hilight	Samarnpan Deemongkol 37'	Stadium: Lampang Provincial Stadium; Attendance: 350; Referee: Wutipong Ketkham

=== First round ===
The first round will be featured by sixty-four clubs; including twenty-eight clubs which were the winners of the qualification round (eight clubs from T2, three clubs from T3, nine clubs from T4, and eight clubs from T5) and thirty-six clubs that the new entries (eighteen clubs from T1, five clubs from T2, three clubs from T3, three clubs from T4, and seven clubs from T5). First round had drawn on 30 May 2018 by FA Thailand.

27 June 2018	Sing Ubon (T5)	0–2	BGC (T4)	Bangkok
15:00 (UTC+7)		Report; Hilight	Rangsiman Sruamprakum 4'; Phattharaphon Jansuwan 82'	Stadium: Grakcu United Stadium; Attendance: 30; Referee: Sukhon Boonplod

27 June 2018	Bankhai United (T4)	7–0	Muangkrung (T5)	Rayong
15:30 (UTC+7)	Camara Souleymane 14', 34', 84'; Chalongchai Phothong 22'; Nattawut Kawchot 53'; Piya Kruawan 55'; Rittikrit Nilchawee 63'	Report		Stadium: Wai Krong Stadium; Attendance: 100; Referee: Yutthana Sadkrathok

27 June 2018	Army Welfare Department (T5)	1–8	Sisaket (T2)	Pathum Thani
15:30 (UTC+7)	Nattapon Pangmee 82'	Report; Hilight	Heman Kitiamphiphruek 31'; Žarko Korać 36', 80'; Chatri Rattanawong 48', 78'; Somyot Pongsuwan 54', 60'; Cristiano da Silva Santos 89'	Stadium: Thupatemee Stadium; Attendance: 350; Referee: Jirayut Kasipol

27 June 2018	Samutsongkhram (T4)	0–5	Army United (T2)	Samut Songkhram
15:30 (UTC+7)		Report; Half-time Hilight; Full-time Hilight	Suksan Mungpao 17'; Rittiporn Whanchuen 19'; Diego Lima 49'; Tanakorn Dangthong 52', 62'	Stadium: Samut Songkhram PAO. Stadium; Attendance: 65; Referee: Boonsong Prachumrak

27 June 2018	Royal Thai Fleet (T4)	0–1	Sakaeo (T3)	Rayong
15:30 (UTC+7)		Report	Tuangsit Soimee 58'	Stadium: Rayong Province Stadium; Attendance: 200; Referee: Worakrit Panyu

27 June 2018	Petpittayakom Alumni (T5)	1–5	Pattaya United (T1)	Phetchabun
15:30 (UTC+7)	Surachart Thaichoy 42'	Report; Hilight	Anuwat Inyin 7', 23', 62'; Picha Autra 52'; Jaroensak Wonggorn 75' (pen.)	Stadium: Phetchabun province stadium Attendance: 210; Referee: Pongpat Kaewbaworn

27 June 2018	Royal Thai Army (T3)	3–1	Udon Thani (T2)	Bangkok
15:30 (UTC+7)	Noppadol Juijaiherm 72'; Noppadon Kasaen 84'; Apirak Dawrueng 90+1'	Report	Sho Shimoji 43' (pen.)	Stadium: Thai Army Sports Stadium; Attendance: 190; Referee: Peerathat Kittikanmetee

27 June 2018	Nara United (T3)	2–0 (a.e.t.)	Rayong (T2)	Narathiwat
15:30 (UTC+7)	Somnuek Kaew-arporn 108', 120+3'	Report; Hilight		Stadium: Narathiwat Province Stadium; Attendance: 450; Referee: Pirot Bunkamnoed

27 June 2018	Samut Prakan (T4)	0–2	Ubon UMT United (T1)	Samut Prakan
15:30 (UTC+7)		Report	Thaweekun Thong-on 8'; Jedsadakorn Kow-ngam 90+2'	Stadium: Samut Prakarn SAT Stadium (Keha Bang Phli); Attendance: 142; Referee: Wichet Tianthong

27 June 2018	Chainat United (T4)	1–0	Thai Honda (T2)	Chai Nat
15:30 (UTC+7)	Thatsanai Sueasakun 78'	Report		Stadium: Nong Mamong Stadium; Attendance: 11; Referee: Prasert Arjpakdee

27 June 2018	Rajamangala University Of Technology Rattanakosin (T5)	1–1 (a.e.t.) (10–11 p)	Vongchavalitkul University (T5)	Bangkok
15:30 (UTC+7)	Nattapong Boonphom 65'	Report; Half-time Hilight; Full-time Hilight; Penalty-time Hilight	Chanon Mothongsri 78' (pen.)	Stadium: Thonburi Stadium; Attendance: 58; Referee: Chanachai Promthat
	Penalties
	Pakorn Tep-opas (penalty missed); Nattapong Boonphom (penalty scored); Thanawat Yimlamai (penalty scored); Nonthaphut Pan-aimthon (penalty scored); Pathomporn Jamyat (penalty scored); Chaiwut Sameesong (penalty scored); Suphakorn Yiamming (penalty scored); Pornchai Duangthong (penalty scored); Ratpricha Madang (penalty scored); Boriwat Suriye (penalty scored); Sawettachai Chootong (penalty scored); Pakorn Tep-opas (penalty missed)		(penalty missed) Nantawat Sakda; (penalty scored) Jakkrid Tapsrikaew; (penalty scored) Chanon Mothongsri; (penalty scored) Anuchit Jermkhoksung; (penalty scored) Pongsak Nomkhunthod; (penalty scored) Apichit Thakernglarp; (penalty scored) Naruebet Tankratok; (penalty scored) Kittisak Panchuea; (penalty scored) Smit Niwetkun; (penalty scored) Assarapong Lertkrathok; (penalty scored) Tinnakorn Krongchuea; (penalty scored) Nantawat Sakda

27 June 2018	Tamuang (T5)	1–5	Port (T1)	Kanchanaburi
15:30 (UTC+7)	Nutnarong Sukwisit 31'	Report; Hilight	Dragan Bošković 11', 23', 25' (pen.); Pakorn Prempak 48'; Todsapol Lated 64'	Stadium: Kanchanaburi Province Stadium; Attendance: 369; Referee: Songkran Boonmeekiat

27 June 2018	Kranuan (T5)	0–3	Nakhon Pathom United (T4)	Khon Kaen
15:30 (UTC+7)		Report; Hilight	John Sam 27'; Olveira Silva Diego 53', 84'	Stadium: 50th Anniversary Stadium of Khon Kaen University; Attendance: 330; Referee: Songkiat Jangjan

27 June 2018	NBN Kanthararom United (T5)	0–3 (a.e.t.)	JL Chiangmai United (T3)	Sisaket
17:00 (UTC+7)		Report	Chatchai Narkwijit 92'; Roberto Pítio 97'; Montree Siriwattanasuwan 114'	Stadium: SAT Sisaket Stadium; Attendance: 240; Referee: Arnon Borisut

27 June 2018	PT Prachuap (T1)	0–1	Sukhothai (T1)	Prachuap Khiri Khan
18:00 (UTC+7)		Report; Hilight	Kittipong Wongma 71'	Stadium: Sam Ao Stadium; Attendance: 1,852; Referee: Wisawet Sangnakorn

27 June 2018	Uttaradit (T4)	2–0	Pualand (T5)	Uttaradit
18:00 (UTC+7)	Arboubacar Sanogo Junior 46'; Pitsanu Ngamsa-nguan 90+4'	Report; Hilight		Stadium: Mon-mai Stadium; Attendance: 251; Referee: Suchin Keawsopa

27 June 2018	Buriram United (T1)	0–0 (a.e.t.) (8–7 p)	Bangkok United (T1)	Buriram
18:00 (UTC+7)		Report; Hilight		Stadium: Chang Arena; Attendance: 6,472; Referee: Teetichai Nuanjan
	Penalties
	Diogo (penalty scored); Andrés Túñez (penalty scored); Osvaldo (penalty scored); Pansa Hemviboon (penalty missed); Siwarak Tedsungnoen (penalty scored); Yoo Jun-soo (penalty scored); Sasalak Haiprakhon (penalty scored); Jakkaphan Kaewprom (penalty scored); Narubadin Weerawatnodom (penalty scored)		(penalty scored) Robson Fernandes; (penalty missed) Vander Luíz; (penalty scored) Sanrawat Dechmitr; (penalty scored) Everton Gonçalves; (penalty scored) Manuel Bihr; (penalty scored) Ekkachai Sumrei; (penalty scored) Sathaporn Daengsee; (penalty scored) Alexander Sieghart; (penalty missed) Sumanya Purisai

27 June 2018	Naresuan (T5)	1–4	Bangkok Glass (T1)	Phitsanulok
18:00 (UTC+7)	Wanchana Rattana 15'	Report; Hilight	Chatree Chimtalay 15', 90+1'; Surachat Sareepim 64'; Warut Bunsuk 86'	Stadium: Naresuan University stadium Attendance: 1,000; Referee: Wutipong Ketkham

27 June 2018	Police Tero (T1)	4–1	Chainat Hornbill (T1)	Bangkok
18:00 (UTC+7)	Nikhom Somwang 4' (o.g.); Nopphon Ponkam 24'; Adisak Srikumpang 35'; Jaturong Pimkoon 39', 45+1'	Report; Hilight		Stadium: Boonyachinda Stadium; Attendance: 788; Referee: Warinthorn Sassadee

27 June 2018	Khonkaen (T2)	3–1 (a.e.t.)	Bangkok (T3)	Khon Kaen
18:00 (UTC+7)	Thanapol Srithong 87'; Santirad Wiang-in 92'; Yuttana Ruangsuksut 99'	Report; Hilight	Thanaphat Waempracha 38'	Stadium: Khon Kaen Province Stadium; Attendance: 2,342; Referee: Anupong Duangsri

27 June 2018	Nakhon Ratchasima (T1)	0–1	Chiangrai United (T1)	Nakhon Ratchasima
18:00 (UTC+7)		Report; Hilight	Victor Cardozo 40'	Stadium: 80th Birthday Stadium; Attendance: 794; Referee: Natee Chusuwan

27 June 2018	Suphanburi (T1)	0–1	Ratchaburi Mitr Phol (T1)	Suphanburi
18:00 (UTC+7)		Report; Hilight	Nerijus Valskis 21'	Stadium: Suphan Buri Provincial Stadium; Attendance: 1,225; Referee: Chairoek Ngamsom

27 June 2018	Nonthaburi (T4)	1–2 (a.e.t.)	Kasetsart (T2)	Nonthaburi
18:00 (UTC+7)	Attapol Boonkun 65'	Report	Chetta Kokkaew 89'; Danilo Lopes 110'	Stadium: Nonthaburi Province Stadium; Attendance: 56; Referee: Kritchai Sanmatr

27 June 2018	Trat (T2)	6–0	Phitsanulok (T4)	Trat
18:00 (UTC+7)	Warut Supphaso 89'; Barros Tardeli 20', 28'; Hiromichi Katano 69'; Wanit Jaisaen 85'; Milan Bubalo 90+2'	Report; Hilight		Stadium: Trat Provincial Stadium; Attendance: 422; Referee: Kotchapum Meesridecha

27 June 2018	Phrae United (T3)	4–0	Kohkwang Subdistrict Municipality (T5)	Phrae
18:00 (UTC+7)	Suriyakarn Chimjeen 65'; Arthit Peeraban 72'; Mustafa Zazai 85', 90+1'	Report; Hilight		Stadium: Thunghong Municipality Stadium; Attendance: 229; Referee: Piyapong Thongkhian

27 June 2018	Nakhon Mae Sot United (T4)	0–2	Krabi (T2)	Tak
18:00 (UTC+7)		Report	Amaret Amonlertsak 40'; Ivan Vuković 45+1'	Stadium: Naresuan maharaj stadium Attendance: 236; Referee: Noppadech Muang-ngam

27 June 2018	Navy (T1)	2–0	Muang Loei United (T4)	Chonburi
18:00 (UTC+7)	Praphas Rattanadee 60'; Gabriel Quak 90+2'	Report; Hilight		Stadium: Sattahip Navy Stadium; Attendance: 514; Referee: Wittaya Saraket

27 June 2018	Ubon Kids City (T5)	0–2	PTT Rayong (T2)	Ubon Ratchathani
18:00 (UTC+7)		Report; Hilight	Chainarong Tathong 20'; Thanakorn Niyomwan 75'	Stadium: Ubon Ratchathani University Stadium; Attendance: 682; Referee: Wittaya Kamuadsap

27 June 2018	Chonburi (T1)	5–1	Pibulsongkram Rajabhat University (T5)	Chonburi
18:00 (UTC+7)	Worachit Kanitsribampen 20'; Matheus Alves 28', 42'; Kritsada Kaman 38', 62'	Report; Hilight	Marut Chimlai 37'	Stadium: Chonburi Stadium; Attendance: 511; Referee: Krissada Luangyod

27 June 2018	Chiangmai (T2)	2–3	Air Force Central (T1)	Chiang Mai
18:00 (UTC+7)	Seo Dong-hyeon 85'; Hiziel Souza Soares 89' (pen.)	Report; Hilight	Greg Houla 28', 90+3'; Thammachat Nakhaphan 64'	Stadium: 700th Anniversary Stadium; Attendance: 220; Referee: Chayapol Laosupan

27 June 2018	SCG Muangthong United (T1)	1–0	Nongbua Pitchaya (T2)	Nonthaburi
18:00 (UTC+7)	Heberty 47'	Report; Hilight		Stadium: SCG Stadium; Attendance: 1,379; Referee: Panumas Pansamo

27 June 2018	Lampang (T2)	12–0	Salaeng Subdistrict Municipality (T5)	Lampang
18:00 (UTC+7)	Faysal Shayesteh 13'; Ronnapee Choeykamdee 23'; Wuttichai Sooksen 25', 29'; Choklap Nilsang 47'; Poramut Krongborisut 50'; Tiago Chulapa 63', 76', 77'; Pedro Alves 64', 70'; Alongkorn Thongjean 80'	Report; Hilight		Stadium: Lampang Provincial Stadium; Attendance: 237; Referee: Pathompong Eawjaroen

=== Second round ===
The second round will be featured by thirty-two clubs which were the winners of the first round; including thirteen clubs from T1, eight clubs from T2, five clubs from T3, five clubs from T4, and one club from T5. Second round had drawn on 30 June 2018 by FA Thailand.

4 July 2018	JL Chiangmai United (T3)	0–1	Khonkaen (T2)	Chiangmai
15:30 (UTC+7)		Report; Hilight	Thanaphat Phutnok 85'	Stadium: 700th Anniversary Stadium; Attendance: 378; Referee: Boonsong Prachumrak; Assistant referees: Chaiyan Sattayapong, Narong Hanseuk; Fourth official: Chaiwat Bunsong

4 July 2018	Vongchavalitkul University (T5)	1–4	Police Tero (T1)	Nakhon Ratchasima
15:30 (UTC+7)	Pongsak Nomkhunthod 90+3'	Report; Hilight	Mongkol Tossakrai 2' (pen.); Narong Chansawek 24', 90+2'; Matej Podstavek 87'	Stadium: Suranaree University of Technology Stadium; Attendance: 132; Referee: Dusit Iamsakul; Assistant referees: Rachan Dawangpa, Chaowalit Poonprasit; Fourth official: Ekkachai Phetcham

4 July 2018	Bankhai United (T4)	3–1 (a.e.t.)	Pattaya United (T1)	Rayong
15:30 (UTC+7)	Elvis Job 80'; Fodé Diakité 105'; Panukorn Papha 110'	Report; Hilight	Lukian 88' (pen.)	Stadium: Wai Krong Stadium; Attendance: 150; Referee: Chairoek Ngamsom; Assistant referees: Komsan Kamphaen, Wattana Chonchanakul; Fourth official: Chaiyaporn Yongsaeng

4 July 2018	Chainat United (T4)	0–2	Krabi (T2)	Chai Nat
15:30 (UTC+7)		Report	Ivan Vuković 63', 77'	Stadium: Nong Mamong Stadium; Attendance: 110; Referee: Kritchai Sanmatr; Assistant referees: Banpot Kunhong, Narin Wongprapaipak; Fourth official: Anupong Duangsri

4 July 2018	BGC (T4)	1–0	Royal Thai Army (T3)	Pathum Thani
16:00 (UTC+7)	Thammayut Rakboon 89'	Report		Stadium: Rajamangala University of Technology Thanyaburi Satadium; Attendance: 230; Referee: Chayanan Thuto; Assistant referees: Tanes Jairew, Pradit Khukhankhet; Fourth official: Dassakorn Hokla

4 July 2018	Nara United (T3)	1–0	Ubon UMT United (T1)	Narathiwat
16:30 (UTC+7)	Pithak Abdulraman 70'	Report; Hilight		Stadium: Narathiwat PAO. Stadium; Attendance: 640; Referee: Anuwat Feemuechang; Assistant referees: Binlha Preeda, Kanchit Nittayachat; Fourth official: Sanya Sathitdamrongkul

4 July 2018	Buriram United (T1)	6–0	Lampang (T2)	Buriram
18:00 (UTC+7)	Supachai Chaided 12', 73', 87'; Jakkaphan Kaewprom 66', 90+4'; Diogo 81' (pen.)	Report; Hilight		Stadium: Chang Arena; Attendance: 5,941; Referee: Warinthorn Sassadee; Assistant referees: Apichit Nopuan, Worapong Prasertsri; Fourth official: Pongpat Kaewbaworn

4 July 2018	Kasetsart (T2)	5–7	Trat (T2)	Bangkok
18:00 (UTC+7)	Danilo 15' (pen.); Chetta Kokkaew 28'; Tanaset Jintapaputanasiri 45+2', 79'; Boubacar Sidiki Koné 48'	Report	Piyawit Janput 19'; Barros Tardeli 24', 37', 53'; Thanaset Sujarit 49'; Milan Bubalo 66'; Wanit Jaisaen 89'	Stadium: TOT Stadium Chaeng Watthana; Attendance: 320; Referee: Peerathat Kittikanmetee; Assistant referees: Pramot Boon-in, Tassanai Sarobon; Fourth official: Pathompong Eawjaroen

4 July 2018	Phrae United (T3)	0–2	Sisaket (T2)	Phrae
18:00 (UTC+7)		Report; Hilight	Tatree Seeha 71'; Chatri Rattanawong 75'	Stadium: Thunghong Municipality Stadium; Attendance: 325; Referee: Noppadech Muang-ngam; Assistant referees: Srisuwan Bunnam, Udon Aneksak; Fourth official: Kotchaphum Meesridecha

4 July 2018	Sakaeo (T3)	1–2	Navy (T1)	Sakaeo
18:00 (UTC+7)	Sutee Khamcha 15'	Report; Hilight	Sakeereen Teekasom 26'; Panuwat Failai 45'	Stadium: Sakaeo PAO. Stadium; Attendance: 300; Referee: Wisawet Sangnakorn; Assistant referees: Chotrawee Thongduang, Wiroj Lorkam; Fourth official: Yosakorn Pakdeesuwan

4 July 2018	Port (T1)	5–0	PTT Rayong (T2)	Bangkok
19:00 (UTC+7)	Kim Sung-hwan 10', 83'; Dragan Bošković 34' (pen.), 45+1'; Siwakorn Chakkuprasart 39'	Report; Hilight		Stadium: PAT Stadium; Attendance: 2,239; Referee: Wichet Tianthong; Assistant referees: Pattarapong Kijsathit, Sumet Piasiri; Fourth official: Nikorn Khanthasorn

4 July 2018	Bangkok Glass (T1)	1–3 (a.e.t.)	Ratchaburi Mitr Phol (T1)	Pathum Thani
19:00 (UTC+7)	Chatree Chimtalay 5'	Report; Hilight	Suree Sukha 47'; Yannick Djaló 106'; Nerijus Valskis 109'	Stadium: Leo Stadium; Attendance: 2,055; Referee: Krissada Luangyod; Assistant referees: Rachen Srichai, Rawut Nakharit; Fourth official: Somsak Phusomneuk

4 July 2018	Chonburi (T1)	7–0	Uttaradit (T4)	Chonburi
19:00 (UTC+7)	Bajram Nebihi 7' (pen.); Worachit Kanitsribampen 17'; Ciro Alves 50'; Settawut Wongsai 71'; Saharat Sontisawat 74', 80'; Nititorn Sripramarn 87'	Report; Hilight		Stadium: Chonburi Stadium; Attendance: 510; Referee: Teetichai Nuanjan; Assistant referees: Tanes Chuchuen, Pariwat Poyu; Fourth official: Rofik Nimjaroen

4 July 2018	Chiangrai United (T1)	2–0	Air Force Central (T1)	Chiangrai
19:00 (UTC+7)	Bill 8', 59' (pen.)	Report; Hilight		Stadium: Singha Stadium; Attendance: 1,109; Referee: Natee Chusuwan; Assistant referees: Phubet Lekpha, Wichet Ketkaew; Fourth official: Peerasan Krataithong

4 July 2018	Nakhon Pathom United (T4)	2–0	Sukhothai (T1)	Nakhon Pathom
19:00 (UTC+7)	John Sam 34'; Teerayut Ngamlamai 87'	Report; Hilight		Stadium: Nakhon Pathom Municipality Sport School Stadium; Attendance: 739; Referee: Songkran Boonmeekiat; Assistant referees: Tanin Ruenjit, Nuannij Donjungreed; Fourth official: Seksan Punsri

4 July 2018	SCG Muangthong United (T1)	2–0	Army United (T2)	Nonthaburi
19:00 (UTC+7)	Heberty 47'; Jajá Coelho 55'	Report; Hilight		Stadium: SCG Stadium; Attendance: 3,047; Referee: Sivakorn Pu-udom; Assistant referees: Poonsawas Samransuk, Kitisak Pikulngoen; Fourth official: Anon Borisut

=== Third round ===
The third round will be featured by sixteen clubs which were the winners of the second round; including eight clubs from T1, four clubs from T2, one club from T3, and three clubs from T4. Third round had drawn on 13 July 2018 by FA Thailand.

25 July 2018	Nara United (T3)	1–0	BGC (T4)	Narathiwat
16:30 (UTC+7)	Ahamarasul Due-reh 88'	Report; Hilight		Stadium: Narathiwat PAO. Stadium; Attendance: 800; Referee: Sanya Sathitdamrongkul; Assistant referees: Tuwaeyuso Kuji, Aris Madpanjor; Fourth official: Wichai Pannil

25 July 2018	Trat (T2)	2–3	Port (T1)	Trat
18:00 (UTC+7)	Barros Tardeli 21', 48'	Report; Hilight	Kim Sung-hwan 64'; Sergio Suárez 82'; Kevin Deeromram 90+4'	Stadium: Trat Provincial Stadium; Attendance: 933; Referee: Natee Chusuwan; Assistant referees: Worapong Prasertsri, Chotrawee Thongduang; Fourth official: Pansa Chaisanit

25 July 2018	Navy (T1)	0–2	Sisaket (T2)	Chonburi
19:00 (UTC+7)		Report; Hilight	Suksayam Chanmaneewech 48'; Pongsak Boonthot 52'	Stadium: Sattahip Navy Stadium; Attendance: 786; Referee: Kotchapum Meesridecha; Assistant referees: Komsan Kamphaen, Wattana Chonchanakul; Fourth official: Pongpat Kaewbaworn

25 July 2018	Khonkaen (T2)	4–1	Bankhai United (T4)	Khonkaen
19:00 (UTC+7)	Chatchai Jiakklang 23', 39'; Thanapol Srithong 53', 72'	Report; Hilight	Piya Kruawan 64' (pen.)	Stadium: Khonkaen PAO. Stadium; Attendance: 1,650; Referee: Wisawet Sangnakorn; Assistant referees: Chaowalit Poonprasit, Binlha Preeda; Fourth official: Kritsada Luangyos

25 July 2018	Chiangrai United (T1)	0–0 (a.e.t.) (5–4 p)	SCG Muangthong United (T1)	Chiangrai
19:00 (UTC+7)		Report; Hilight		Stadium: Singha Stadium; Attendance: 1,780; Referee: Chairoek Ngamsom; Assistant referees: Tanes Chuchuen, Kitisak Pikulngoen; Fourth official: Teetichai Nuanjan
	Penalties
	Bill (penalty scored); Victor Cardozo (penalty missed); Suriya Singmui (penalty scored); Chaiyawat Buran (penalty scored); William Henrique (penalty scored); Phitiwat Sukjitthammakul (penalty scored)		(penalty scored) Heberty; (penalty scored) Tristan Do; (penalty scored) Sarach Yooyen; (penalty missed) Peerapat Notchaiya; (penalty scored) Jajá Coelho; (penalty missed) Chenrop Samphaodi

25 July 2018	Nakhon Pathom United (T4)	1–2 (a.e.t.)	Buriram United (T1)	Nakhon Pathom
19:00 (UTC+7)	Olveira Silva Diego 78'	Report; Hilight	Supachai Chaided 19'; Supachok Sarachat 113'	Stadium: Nakhon Pathom Municipality Sport School Stadium; Attendance: 2,683; Referee: Sivakorn Pu-udom; Assistant referees: Phattarapong Kijsathit, Rachan Dawangpa; Fourth official: Chayapon Laosuphan

25 July 2018	Ratchaburi Mitr Phol (T1)	5–0	Krabi (T2)	Ratchaburi
19:00 (UTC+7)	Yannick Djaló 7', 84'; Mark Hartmann 14'; Montree Promsawat 78'; Sompong Soleb 90'	Report; Hilight		Stadium: Ratchaburi Stadium; Attendance: 1,423; Referee: Niwat Insa-ard; Assistant referees: Phubet Lekpha, Wichet Ketkaew; Fourth official: Wichet Thianthong

25 July 2018	Chonburi (T1)	4–1	Police Tero (T1)	Chonburi
19:00 (UTC+7)	Kroekrit Thaweekarn 19'; Phanuphong Phonsa 27'; Matheus Alves 38'; Bajram Nebihi 55'	Report; Hilight	Marcos Vinícius 67'	Stadium: Chonburi Stadium; Attendance: 1,351; Referee: Mongkolchai Petchsri; Assistant referees: Poonsawas Samransuk, Teerapon Sanyapluem; Fourth official: Pathompong Eawjaroen

=== Quarter-finals ===
The quarter-finals round will be featured by eight clubs which were the winners of the third round; including five clubs from T1, two clubs from T2, and one club from T3. Quarter-finals round had drawn on 26 July 2018 by FA Thailand.

1 August 2018	Nara United (T3)	0–5	Chiangrai United (T1)	Narathiwat
16:30 (UTC+7)		Report; Hilight	William Henrique 32'; Siwakorn Tiatrakul 35'; Bill 50', 85'; Chaiyawat Buran 84'	Stadium: Narathiwat PAO. Stadium; Attendance: 7,000; Referee: Teetichai Nuanjan; Assistant referees: Binlha Preeda, Worapong Prasertsri; Fourth official: Pichit Nasuwan

1 August 2018	Ratchaburi Mitr Phol (T1)	1–0	Chonburi (T1)	Ratchaburi
19:00 (UTC+7)	Nattawut Sombatyotha 90+1'	Report report		Stadium: Mitr Phol Stadium; Attendance: 2,723; Referee: Sivakorn Pu-udom; Assistant referees: Komsan Kamphaen, Phubet Lekpha; Fourth official: Wichet Thianthong

1 August 2018	Sisaket (T2)	4–3	Khonkaen (T2)	Sisaket
19:00 (UTC+7)	Chatri Rattanawong 4'; Cristiano da Silva Santos 4' (pen.), 34'; Somyot Pongsuwan 26'	Report; Hilight	Chatchai Jiakklang 70', 89'; Yuttana Ruangsuksut 84'	Stadium: Sri Nakhon Lamduan Stadium; Attendance: 1,252; Referee: Natee Chusuwan; Assistant referees: Apichit Nopuan, Phoonsawas Samransuk; Fourth official: Wisawet Sungnakhon

1 August 2018	Port (T1)	1–3	Buriram United (T1)	Bangkok
19:00 (UTC+7)	Pakorn Prempak 66'	Report; Hilight	Pansa Hemviboon 16'; Supachai Chaided 17'; David Rochela 39' (o.g.)	Stadium: PAT Stadium; Attendance: 5,519; Referee: Chairoek Ngamsom; Assistant referees: Tanes Chuchuen, Wichet Ketkaew; Fourth official: Suwat Wongsuwan

=== Semi-finals ===
The semi-finals round will be featured by four clubs which were the winners of the quarter-finals round; including three clubs from T1 and one club from T2. Semi-finals round had drawn on 23 August 2018 by FA Thailand.

26 September 2018	Ratchaburi Mitr Phol (T1)	1–3 (a.e.t.)	Chiangrai United (T1)	Bangkok
19:00 (UTC+7)	Victor Cardozo 66' (o.g.)	Report; Hilight	Sarawut Inpaen 89'; William Henrique 112'; Bill 120+1'	Stadium: Supachalasai Stadium; Attendance: 4,246; Referee: Sivakorn Pu-udom; Assistant referees: Rawut Nakharit, Rachen Srichai; Fourth official: Chairoek Ngamsom

26 September 2018	Sisaket (T2)	1–2	Buriram United (T1)	Bangkok
19:00 (UTC+7)	Soukaphone Vongchiengkham 23'	Report; Hilight	Javier Patiño 12'; Pansa Hemviboon 55'	Stadium: Boonyachinda Stadium; Attendance: 3,452; Referee: Teetichai Nuanjan; Assistant referees: Tanet Chuchuen, Komsan Kamphaen; Fourth official: Warintorn Sasadee

=== Final ===
The final round will be featured by two clubs which were the winners of the semi-finals round; both are the clubs from T1. It was played at the Supachalasai Stadium in Bangkok, Thailand on 27 October 2018.

27 October 2018	Chiangrai United (T1)	3–2	Buriram United (T1)	Bangkok
19:00 (UTC+7)	Bill 2', 44' (pen.), 72'	Report; Highlight	Osvaldo 25'; Diogo 52' (pen.)	Stadium: Supachalasai Stadium; Attendance: 17,540; Referee: Torpong Somsing; Assistant referees: Phattarapong Kijsathit, Rawut Nakharit; Fourth official: Songkran Bunmeekiat

== See also ==
- 2018 Thai League
- 2018 Thai League 2
- 2018 Thai League 3
- 2018 Thai League 4
- 2018 Thailand Amateur League
- 2018 Thai League Cup
- 2018 Thailand Champions Cup
