= Khorat (disambiguation) =

Khorat or Korat may refer to:

- the informal name of Nakhon Ratchasima town or Nakhon Ratchasima province, Thailand
- Khorat Sub-district in Sung Noen district of Nakhon Ratchasima Province
- Khorat Plateau, a plateau in the northeastern Isan region of Thailand
- Khorat Thai, an ethnic group in Thailand
- Korat (RTGS: Khorat), a cat breed originating in Thailand
- Korat F.C., a minor football club in Thailand
