= Nong Bua City F.C. =

Thai football club

Nong Bua City หนองบัว ซิตี้
- Full name: Nong Bua City Football Club หนองบัว ซิตี้
- Nickname(s): Lumphu Tiger พยัคฆ์ลุ่มภู
- Founded: 2016; 9 years ago
- Ground: ? Nong Bua Lamphu, Thailand
- League: 2017 Thailand Amateur League North Eastern Region

Nong Bua City Football Club (Thai หนองบัว ซิตี้), is a Thai football club based in Nong Bua Lamphu, Thailand. The club is currently playing in the 2017 Thailand Amateur League North Eastern Region.

== Record ==
Season	League									FA Cup	League Cup	Top goalscorer	
Season	Division	P	W	D	L	F	A	Pts	Pos	FA Cup	League Cup	Name	Goals
2016	DIV 3 North	3	1	0	2	4	6	3	9th - 13th	Not Enter	Can't Enter		
2017	TA North-East	5	0	0	5	5	13	0	11th - 12th	Not Enter	Can't Enter		
2018	TA North-East									Not Enter	Can't Enter		

Champions	Runners-up	Promoted	Relegated
