= Kanthararom United F.C. =

Thai football club

NBN Kanthararom United เอ็นบีเอ็น กันทรารมย์ ยูไนเต็ด
- Full name: NBN Kanthararom United Football Club สโมสรฟุตบอลเอ็นบีเอ็น กันทรารมย์ ยูไนเต็ด
- Nickname(s): Killer Shallot (หอมแดงพิฆาต)
- Founded: 2015; 10 years ago
- Ground: NBN Arena; Sisaket, Thailand
- Chairman: Jurawat thonglue
- Manager: Jutamas Kasikitworakun
- League: 2018 Thailand Amateur League North Eastern Region

NBN Kanthararom United Football Club (Thai สโมสรฟุตบอลเอ็นบีเอ็น กันทรารมย์ ยูไนเต็ด), is a Thailand Association football club based Sisaket in Thailand. The club is currently playing in the 2018 Thailand Amateur League North Eastern Region.

== Record ==
Season	League									Thailand FA Cup	Thai League Cup	Top goalscorer	
Season	Division	P	W	D	L	F	A	Pts	Pos	Thailand FA Cup	Thai League Cup	Name	Goals
2017	TA North-East	6	1	2	3	8	13	5	11th - 12th	Not Enter	Can't Enter		
2018	TA North-East	2	1	1	0	4	2	4	19th	R1	Can't Enter	Setthasak Surawit; Wanchalerm Saiwong; Apisit Yutimit; Wittaya Kanthong; Chaiyot Sae-tae	1
2022–23	TA North-East									R1	Can't Enter		
2023–24	TA North-East										Can't Enter		

Champions	Runners-up	Promotion and relegation	Promotion and relegation
