= Pibulsongkram Rajabhat University F.C. =

Thai football club

Pibulsongkram Rajabhat University มรภ.พิบูลสงคราม
- Full name: Pibulsongkram Rajabhat University Football Club สโมสรฟุตบอลมหาวิทยาลัยราชภัฏพิบูลสงคราม
- Nicknames: Black King (พระองค์ดำ)
- Founded: 2014; 12 years ago
- Ground: Pra-ong dam Stadium; Phitsanulok, Thailand
- League: 2017 Thailand Amateur League Northern Region

Pibulsongkram Rajabhat University Football Club (Thai สโมสรฟุตบอลมหาวิทยาลัยราชภัฏพิบูลสงคราม), is a Thai football club based in Chiang Mai, Thailand. The club is currently playing in the 2017 Thailand Amateur League Northern Region.

== Record ==
Season	League									FA Cup	League Cup	Top goalscorer	
Season	Division	P	W	D	L	F	A	Pts	Pos	FA Cup	League Cup	Name	Goals
2016	DIV 3 North	2	1	1	1	8	3	4	5th - 8th	Not Enter	Can't Enter		
2017	TA North									Not Enter	Can't Enter		
2018	TA North									R1	Can't Enter		

Champions	Runners-up	Promoted	Relegated
