= 2016 Thai Division 3 Tournament North Eastern Region =

2016 Football Division 3 Tournament North Eastern Region is the 1st season of the League competition since its establishment in 2016. It is in the fourth tier of the Thai football league system.

== Venue Stadium and locations (2016) ==
All matches played in Wang Saphung, Loei

Wang Saphung, Loei	Wang Saphung District Stadium is located in Thailand
Wang Saphung District Stadium	Wang Saphung District Stadium is located in Thailand
17.306066°N 101.770147°E	Wang Saphung District Stadium is located in Thailand
Capacity: ?	Wang Saphung District Stadium is located in Thailand

== Member clubs ==
Section	Club	Province	Years
1	Nakhon Ratchasima United	Nakhon Ratchasima	2016
1	Korat City	Nakhon Ratchasima	2016
1	Korat	Nakhon Ratchasima	2016
2	Bundit Asia College	Khon Kaen	2016
2	Wang Saphung	Loei	2016
2	Huai Thalaeng	Nakhon Ratchasima	2016
3	Nong Han	Udon Thani	2016
3	Pern Pak Chong	Nakhon Ratchasima	2016
3	TWD Tanaytum	Sisaket	2016
3	Korat United	Nakhon Ratchasima	2016

== Format ==
Group stage: A total 10 clubs will be divided into four groups of three clubs except group 3 which has four clubs to play round-robin matches at a neutral venue. The best two clubs of group A and B, The best three clubs of group C and The best points of 3rd position in group A and B will qualify to the knock-out stage.

Knock-out stage: A total of 8 clubs which has qualified from the group stage will play single-elimination stage until there are only two finalists of the tournament.

== First round ==
=== Group A ===
Pos	Team	Pld	W	D	L	GF	GA	GD	Pts	Qualification or relegation
1	Nakhon Ratchasima United (drew in 1st position)	2	1	1	0	1	0	+1	4	Qualification to Quarter-finals Round
2	Korat (drew in 2nd position)	2	1	1	0	6	2	+4	4	Qualification to Quarter-finals Round
3	Korat City	2	0	0	2	2	7	−5	0	

Updated to match(es) played on unknown. Source: Thai Division 3
Rules for classification: 1) points; 2) goal difference; 3) number of goals scored.

16 December 2016	Korat	0 - 0	Nakhon Ratchasima United	Loei
13:00 (UTC+7)				Stadium: Wang Saphung District Stadium

18 December 2016	Nakhon Ratchasima United	1 - 0	Korat City	Loei
13:00 (UTC+7)				Stadium: Wang Saphung District Stadium

20 December 2016	Korat City	2 - 6	Korat	Loei
13:00 (UTC+7)				Stadium: Wang Saphung District Stadium

=== Group B ===
Pos	Team	Pld	W	D	L	GF	GA	GD	Pts	Qualification or relegation
1	Huai Thalaeng	2	2	0	0	7	3	+4	6	Qualification to Quarter-finals Round
2	Wang Saphung	2	1	0	1	6	5	+1	3	Qualification to Quarter-finals Round
3	Bundit Asia College (drew in The best points of 3rd position in all groups)	2	0	0	2	2	7	−5	0	Qualification to Quarter-finals Round

Updated to match(es) played on unknown. Source: Thai Division 3
Rules for classification: 1) points; 2) goal difference; 3) number of goals scored.

16 December 2016	Huai Thalaeng	3 - 1	Wang Saphung	Loei
16:00 (UTC+7)				Stadium: Wang Saphung District Stadium

18 December 2016	Bundit Asia College	1 - 4	Wang Saphung	Loei
16:00 (UTC+7)				Stadium: Wang Saphung District Stadium

20 December 2016	Wang Saphung	2 - 4	Huai Thalaeng	Loei
16:00 (UTC+7)				Stadium: Wang Saphung District Stadium

=== Group C ===
Pos	Team	Pld	W	D	L	GF	GA	GD	Pts	Qualification or relegation
1	Nong Han	3	2	1	0	4	1	+3	7	Qualification to Quarter-finals Round
2	Korat United	3	2	0	1	6	3	+3	6	Qualification to Quarter-finals Round
3	TWD Tanaytum	3	1	1	1	4	4	0	4	Qualification to Quarter-finals Round
4	Pern Pak Chong	3	0	0	3	4	10	−6	0	

Updated to match(es) played on unknown. Source: Thai Division 3
Rules for classification: 1) points; 2) goal difference; 3) number of goals scored.

17 December 2016	Nong Han	2 - 0	Pern Pak Chong	Loei
13:00 (UTC+7)				Stadium: Wang Saphung District Stadium

17 December 2016	TWD Tanaytum	0 - 1	Korat United	Loei
16:00 (UTC+7)				Stadium: Wang Saphung District Stadium

19 December 2016	Nong Han	1 - 1	TWD Tanaytum	Loei
13:00 (UTC+7)				Stadium: Wang Saphung District Stadium

19 December 2016	Pern Pak Chong	2 - 5	Korat United	Loei
16:00 (UTC+7)				Stadium: Wang Saphung District Stadium

21 December 2016	Pern Pak Chong	2 - 3	TWD Tanaytum	Loei
13:00 (UTC+7)				Stadium: Wang Saphung District Stadium

21 December 2016	Korat United	0 - 1	Nong Han	Loei
16:00 (UTC+7)				Stadium: Wang Saphung District Stadium

== Quarter-finals Round ==
23 December 2016	TWD Tanaytum	3 - 1	Nakhon Ratchasima United	Loei
13:00 (UTC+7)				Stadium: Wang Saphung District Stadium

24 December 2016	Huai Thalaeng	2 - 1	Korat United	Loei
13:00 (UTC+7)				Stadium: Wang Saphung District Stadium

23 December 2016	Wang Saphung	2(7) - 2(5)	Korat	Loei
16:00 (UTC+7)				Stadium: Wang Saphung District Stadium

24 December 2016	Nong Han	3 - 0	Bundit Asia College	Loei
16:00 (UTC+7)				Stadium: Wang Saphung District Stadium

== Semi-finals Round ==
26 December 2016	TWD Tanaytum	3 - 1	Huai Thalaeng	Loei
13:00 (UTC+7)				Stadium: Wang Saphung District Stadium

26 December 2016	Wang Saphung	2 - 0	Nong Han	Loei
16:00 (UTC+7)				Stadium: Wang Saphung District Stadium

== Final round ==
28 December 2016	TWD Tanaytum	0 - 6	Wang Saphung	Loei
13:00 (UTC+7)				Stadium: Wang Saphung District Stadium

== Winner ==
2016 Thai Division 3 Tournament North Eastern Region

1st title

== See also ==
- 2016 Thai Division 3 Tournament Northern Region
- 2016 Thai Division 3 Tournament Eastern Region
- 2016 Thai Division 3 Tournament Central Region
- 2016 Thai Division 3 Tournament Southern Region
