= 2016 Thai Division 3 Tournament Northern Region =

2016 Football Division 3 Tournament Northern Region is the 1st season of the League competition since its establishment in 2016. It is in the fourth tier of the Thai football league system.

== Venue Stadium and locations (2016) ==
- Section 1,2,3 All matches played in Maejo University San Sai District, Chiang Mai
- Section 4 All matches played in Chiang Mai University Chiang Mai

Coordinates	Location	Stadium	Capacity
18°53′53″N 99°00′47″E	San Sai District, Chiang Mai	Maejo University Stadium	?
18°47′50″N 98°57′23″E	Chiang Mai	Chiang Mai University Stadium	?

== Member clubs ==
Section	Club	province	Years
1	Saenkhan	Uttaradit	2016
1	Pibulsongkram Rajabhat University	Phitsanulok	2016
1	Amnuaysilpa Alumni (Thai: สมาคมนักเรียนเก่าอำนวยศิลป์)	Bangkok	2016
2	Institution of Physical Education Chiang Mai Campus (Thai: สถาบันการพลศึกษา วิทยาเขตเชียงใหม่)	Chiang Mai	2016
2	Northern Tak United	Tak	2016
2	Chainat United	Chai Nat	2016
3	Prachum Nongcheck (Thai: สโมสรประชุมน้องเชค)	Suphanburi	2016
3	Nakhon Mae Sot United	Tak	2016
3	Maejo United	Chiang Mai	2016
4	Nong Bua City	Nong Bua Lamphu	2016
4	Chiangrai Wonderkid for AEC (Thai: เชียงรายวันเดอร์ คิด ฟอร์ เออีซี)	Chiangrai	2016
4	Phetchabun (Thai: สมาคมกีฬาฟุตบอลจังหวัดเพชรบูรณ์)	Phetchabun	2016
4	Changphueak Chiang Mai	Chiang Mai	2016

== Format ==
Group stage: A total 13 clubs will be divided into four groups of three clubs except group 4 which has four clubs to play round-robin matches at a neutral venue. The best two clubs of each group will qualify to the knock-out stage.

Knock-out stage: A total of 8 clubs which has qualified from the group stage will play single-elimination stage until there are only two finalists of the tournament.

== First round ==
=== Group A ===
Pos	Team	Pld	W	D	L	GF	GA	GD	Pts	Qualification or relegation
1	Amnuaysilpa Alumni (drew in 1st position)	2	1	1	0	7	2	+5	4	Qualification to Quarter-finals Round
2	Pibulsongkram Rajabhat University (drew in 2nd position)	2	1	1	0	8	1	+7	4	Qualification to Quarter-finals Round
3	Saenkhan	2	0	0	2	1	13	−12	0	

Updated to match(es) played on unknown. Source: Thai Division 3
Rules for classification: 1) points; 2) goal difference; 3) number of goals scored.

7 January 2017	Pibulsongkram Rajabhat University	7 – 0	Saenkhan	Chiang Mai
10:00 (UTC+7)				Stadium: Maejo University Stadium

9 January 2017	Pibulsongkram Rajabhat University	1 – 1	Amnuaysilpa Alumni	Chiang Mai
13:00 (UTC+7)				Stadium: Maejo University Stadium

11 January 2017	Amnuaysilpa Alumni	6 – 1	Saenkhan	Chiang Mai
10:00 (UTC+7)	Saenkhan			Stadium: Maejo University Stadium

=== Group B ===
Pos	Team	Pld	W	D	L	GF	GA	GD	Pts	Qualification or relegation
1	Chainat United	2	1	1	0	2	1	+1	4	Qualification to Quarter-finals Round
2	Institution of Physical Education Chiang Mai Campus	2	1	0	1	3	2	+1	3	Qualification to Quarter-finals Round
3	Northern Tak United	2	0	1	1	0	2	−2	1	

Updated to match(es) played on unknown. Source: Thai Division 3
Rules for classification: 1) points; 2) goal difference; 3) number of goals scored.

7 January 2017	Institution of Physical Education Chiang Mai Campus	2 – 0	Northern Tak United	Chiang Mai
13:00 (UTC+7)				Stadium: Maejo University Stadium

9 January 2017	Northern Tak United	0 – 0	Chainat United	Chiang Mai
10:00 (UTC+7)				Stadium: Maejo University Stadium

11 January 2017	Chainat United	2 – 1	Institution of Physical Education Chiang Mai Campus	Chiang Mai
13:00 (UTC+7)				Stadium: Maejo University Stadium

=== Group C ===
Pos	Team	Pld	W	D	L	GF	GA	GD	Pts	Qualification or relegation
1	Maejo United	2	2	0	0	13	0	+13	6	Qualification to Quarter-finals Round
2	Nakhon Mae Sot United	2	1	0	1	12	1	+11	3	Qualification to Quarter-finals Round
3	Prachum Nongcheck	2	0	0	2	0	24	−24	0	

Updated to match(es) played on unknown. Source: Thai Division 3
Rules for classification: 1) points; 2) goal difference; 3) number of goals scored.

7 January 2017	Nakhon Mae Sot United	12 – 0	Prachum Nongcheck	Chiang Mai
16:00 (UTC+7)				Stadium: Maejo University Stadium

9 January 2017	Maejo United	1 – 0	Nakhon Mae Sot United	Chiang Mai
16:00 (UTC+7)				Stadium: Maejo University Stadium

11 January 2017	Maejo United	12 – 0	Prachum Nongcheck	Chiang Mai
16:00 (UTC+7)				Stadium: Maejo University Stadium

=== Group D ===
Pos	Team	Pld	W	D	L	GF	GA	GD	Pts	Qualification or relegation
1	Changphueak Chiang Mai	3	3	0	0	13	4	+9	9	Qualification to Quarter-finals Round
2	Phetchabun	3	2	0	1	9	6	+3	6	Qualification to Quarter-finals Round
3	Nong Bua City	3	1	0	2	4	6	−2	3	
4	Chiangrai Wonderkid for AEC	3	0	0	3	2	12	−10	0	

Updated to match(es) played on unknown. Source: Thai Division 3
Rules for classification: 1) points; 2) goal difference; 3) number of goals scored.

8 January 2017	Nong Bua City	1 – 0	Chiangrai Wonderkid for AEC	Chiang Mai
13:00 (UTC+7)				Stadium: Chiang Mai University Stadium

8 January 2017	Changphueak Chiang Mai	4 – 1	Phetchabun	Chiang Mai
16:00 (UTC+7)				Stadium: Chiang Mai University Stadium

10 January 2017	Phetchabun	3 – 2	Nong Bua City	Chiang Mai
13:00 (UTC+7)				Stadium: Chiang Mai University Stadium

10 January 2017	Changphueak Chiang Mai	6 – 2	Chiangrai Wonderkid for AEC	Chiang Mai
13:00 (UTC+7)				Stadium: Chiang Mai University Stadium

12 January 2017	Phetchabun	5 – 0	Chiangrai Wonderkid for AEC	Chiang Mai
13:00 (UTC+7)				Stadium: Chiang Mai University Stadium

12 January 2017	Changphueak Chiang Mai	3 – 1	Nong Bua City	Chiang Mai
16:00 (UTC+7)				Stadium: Chiang Mai University Stadium

== Quarter-finals ==
13 January 2017	Amnuaysilpa Alumni	0 – 3	Institution of Physical Education Chiang Mai Campus	Chiang Mai
13:00 (UTC+7)				Stadium: Maejo University Stadium

13 January 2017	Chainat United	2 – 0	Pibulsongkram Rajabhat University	Chiang Mai
16:00 (UTC+7)				Stadium: Maejo University Stadium

14 January 2017	Phetchabun	1 – 0 *	Maejo United	Chiang Mai
13:00 (UTC+7)		Phetchabun sent Professional football player,who was registered by Chanthaburi in 2016, although it break the law.		Stadium: Maejo University Stadium

14 January 2017	Nakhon Mae Sot United	1(3) – 1(5)	Changphueak Chiang Mai	Chiang Mai
16:00 (UTC+7)				Stadium: Maejo University Stadium

== Semi-finals ==
16 January 2017	Maejo United	0(3) – 0(4)	Institution of Physical Education Chiang Mai Campus	Chiang Mai
13:00 (UTC+7)				Stadium: Maejo University Stadium

16 January 2017	Chainat United	0 – 4	Changphueak Chiang Mai	Chiang Mai
16:00 (UTC+7)				Stadium: Maejo University Stadium

== Final round ==
18 January 2017	Institution of Physical Education Chiang Mai Campus	1(3) – 1(5)	Changphueak Chiang Mai	Chiang Mai
16:00 (UTC+7)				Stadium: Maejo University Stadium

== Winner ==
2016 Thai Division 3 Tournament Northern Region
Changphueak Chiang Mai
1st title

== See also ==
- 2016 Thai Division 3 Tournament North Eastern Region
- 2016 Thai Division 3 Tournament Eastern Region
- 2016 Thai Division 3 Tournament Central Region
- 2016 Thai Division 3 Tournament Southern Region
