= Saenkhan F.C. =

Thai football club

Saenkhan สโมสรฟุตบอลแสนขัน
- Full name: Saenkhan Football Club สโมสรฟุตบอลแสนขัน
- Founded: 2009; 16 years ago
- Ground: ? Uttaradit, Thailand
- League: 2016 Thai Division 3 Tournament Northern Region

Saenkhan Football Club (Thaiสโมสรฟุตบอลแสนขัน เอฟซี), is a Thai football club based in Uttaradit province, Thailand. The club is currently playing in the Thai Football Division 3.

== Record ==
| Season | League | | | | | | | | | FA Cup | League Cup | Top goalscorer | |
| Season | Division | P | W | D | L | F | A | Pts | Pos | FA Cup | League Cup | Name | Goals |
|---|---|---|---|---|---|---|---|---|---|---|---|---|---|
| 2016 | DIV 3 North | | | | | | | | | | | | |

| Champions | Runners-up | Promoted | Relegated |
