= Chiang Mai Physical Education College F.C. =

Thai football club

Singnuea Chiang Mai Physical Education สิงห์เหนือ พลศึกษา เชียงใหม่
- Full name: Singnuea Chiang Mai Physical Education Football Club สโมสรฟุตบอลสิงห์เหนือ พลศึกษา เชียงใหม่
- Founded: 2017; 8 years ago
- Ground: ?, Chiang Mai Thailand
- League: 2017 Thailand Amateur League Northern Region

Singnuea Chiang Mai Physical Education Football Club (Thai สโมสรฟุตบอลสิงห์เหนือ พลศึกษา เชียงใหม่), is a Thai football club based in, Chiang Mai Thailand. The club is currently playing in the 2017 Thailand Amateur League Northern Region.

== Record ==
Season	League									FA Cup	League Cup	Top goalscorer	
Season	Division	P	W	D	L	F	A	Pts	Pos	FA Cup	League Cup	Name	Goals
2016	DIV 3 North	5	2	2	1	7	3	8	2nd	Not Enter	Can't Enter		
2017	TA North	6	5	2	0	27	5	17	2nd	Not Enter	Can't Enter		
2018	TA North									Not Enter	Can't Enter		

Champions	Runners-up	Promoted	Relegated
