= Korat City F.C. (2015) =

Thai football club

Korat City สโมสรฟุตบอลโคราช ซิตี้
- Full name: Korat City Football Club สโมสรฟุตบอลโคราช ซิตี้
- Founded: 2015; 11 years ago
- Ground: ? Nakhon Ratchasima, Thailand
- League: 2016 Thai Division 3 Tournament North Eastern Region

Korat City Football Club (Thai สโมสรฟุตบอลโคราช ซิตี้), is a Thai football club based in Nakhon Ratchasima, Thailand. The club is currently playing in the Thai Football Division 3.

== Record ==
| Season | League | | | | | | | | | FA Cup | League Cup | Top goalscorer | |
| Season | Division | P | W | D | L | F | A | Pts | Pos | FA Cup | League Cup | Name | Goals |
|---|---|---|---|---|---|---|---|---|---|---|---|---|---|
| 2016 | DIV 3 North-East | | | | | | | | | | | | |

| Champions | Runners-up | Promoted | Relegated |
