= Muangchang United F.C. =

Thai football club

Muangchang United เมืองช้าง ยูไนเต็ด
- Full name: Muangchang United Football Club สโมสรฟุตบอลเมืองช้าง ยูไนเต็ด
- Founded: 2015; 11 years ago
- Ground: ? Surin, Thailand
- League: 2017 Thailand Amateur League North Eastern Region

Muangchang United Football Club (Thai สโมสรฟุตบอลเมืองช้าง ยูไนเต็ด), is a Thai football club based in Surin, Thailand. The club is currently playing in the 2017 Thaileague 5 tournament North Eastern Region.

== Record ==
Season	League									FA Cup	League Cup	Top goalscorer	
Season	Division	P	W	D	L	F	A	Pts	Pos	FA Cup	League Cup	Name	Goals
2017	TA North-East	1	0	0	1	0	5	0	13th – 19th	R1	Can't Enter		
2018	TA North-East									QR	Can't Enter		

Champions	Runners-up	Promoted	Relegated
