= Korat F.C. =

Thai football club

Korat สโมสรฟุตบอลโคราช
- Full name: Korat Football Club สโมสรฟุตบอลโคราช
- Founded: 22 June 2007; 19 years ago
- Ground: ? Nakhon Ratchasima, Thailand
- Chairman: Pairoj Nutklang
- Head Coach: Sayan Panbua
- League: 2017 Thailand Amateur League North Eastern Region; Thai League 3, Group Northeast 26/27

Korat Football Club (Thai สโมสรฟุตบอลโคราช), is a Thai football club based in Nakhon Ratchasima, Thailand. The club is currently playing in the 2017 Thailand Amateur League North Eastern Region.

== Record ==
Season	League									FA Cup	League Cup	Top goalscorer	
Season	Division	P	W	D	L	F	A	Pts	Pos	FA Cup	League Cup	Name	Goals
2016	DIV 3 North-East	3	1	2	0	6	2	5	5th – 8th	Not Enter	Can't Enter		
2017	TA North-East	1	0	1	0	3	5	1	13th – 19th	Not Enter	Can't Enter		
2018	TA North-East									Not Enter	Can't Enter		

Champions	Runners-up	Promoted	Relegated
