= Kansit Premthanakul =

Thai association football player

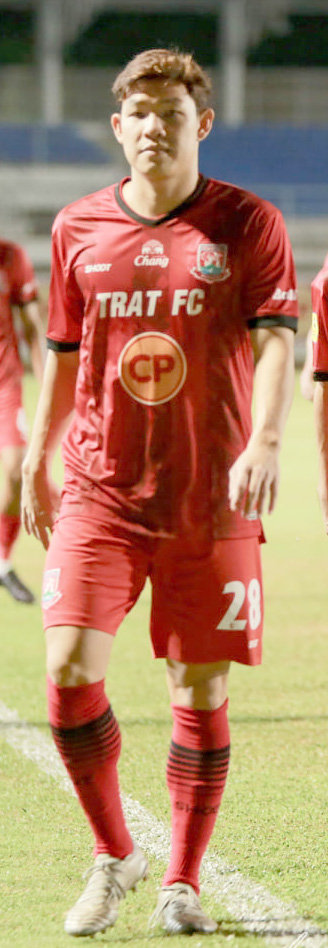

Personal information
- Full name: Kansit Premthanakul
- Date of birth: October 11, 1991 (age 35)
- Place of birth: Chiang Mai, Thailand
- Height: 1.86 m (6 ft 1 in)
- Position: Forward

Team information
- Current team: Sisaket United
- Number: 8

Senior career*
| Years | Team | Apps | (Gls) |
| 2014–2016 | Chiangmai | | |
| 2017–2018 | Ubon United | 24 | (3) |
| 2019 | JL Chiangmai United | 8 | (2) |
| 2019–2020 | Sisaket | 23 | (5) |
| 2020–2021 | Nongbua Pitchaya | 6 | (1) |
| 2021–2022 | Trat | 22 | (4) |
| 2022 | Samut Prakan City | 1 | (0) |
| 2023–2024 | Sisaket United | 0 | (0) |
- * Club domestic league appearances and goals as of 30 April 2023

Kansit Premthanakul (Thai: กัณฑ์สิทธิ์ เปรมธนากุล), born 11 October 1991) is a Thai professional footballer who plays as a forward for Thai League 3 club Sisaket United.

== Honour ==
Nongbua Pitchaya

- Thai League 2: 2020–21
