= William Henrique =

Brazilian footballer

Personal information
- Full name: William Henrique Rodrigues da Silva
- Date of birth: 28 January 1992 (age 34)
- Place of birth: Ribeirão Preto, Brazil
- Height: 1.88 m (6 ft 2 in)
- Position: Winger

Team information
- Current team: Muang Trang United
- Number: 10

Youth career
- Grêmio Prudente

Senior career*
Years	Team	Apps	(Gls)
2010–2012	Grêmio Prudente	33	(2)
2013	Botafogo-BA	9	(3)
2013–2016	Vitória	64	(8)
2013	→ ASA (loan)	3	(0)
2015	→ Ventforet Kofu (loan)	1	(0)
2015	→ Joinville (loan)	3	(0)
2016–2017	Ceará	8	(1)
2017	Ansan Greeners	2	(0)
2017	Londrina	5	(0)
2018	Ituano	3	(0)
2018–2020	Chiangrai United	43	(13)
2020–2021	PT Prachuap	20	(6)
2021	Al-Shahania	0	(0)
2022	Suphanburi	11	(6)
2022–2023	Hajer	9	(0)
2023	Hanoi FC	7	(0)
2024	Marcílio Dias	0	(0)
2024–	Muang Trang United	7	(0)
- * Club domestic league appearances and goals as of 17 November 2024

William Henrique Rodrigues da Silva (born 28 January 1992), known as William Henrique, is a Brazilian footballer who plays as a winger for Muang Trang United.

== Club statistics ==
As of 4 June 2023

Appearances and goals by club, season and competition
Club	Season	League			State League		Cup		League Cup		Continental		Other		Total	
Club	Season	Division	Apps	Goals	Apps	Goals	Apps	Goals	Apps	Goals	Apps	Goals	Apps	Goals	Apps	Goals
Grêmio Prudente	2010	Série A	2	0	—		—		—		—		—		2	0
Grêmio Prudente	2011	Série B	11	1	2	0	—		—		—		—		13	1
Grêmio Prudente	2012	Série B	7	0	11	1	—		—		—		—		18	1
Grêmio Prudente	Total		20	1	13	1	—		—		—		—		33	2
Vitória	2013	Série A	15	4	—		1	0	—		—		0	0	16	4
Vitória	2014	Série A	22	1	11	3	1	0	—		2	1	—		36	5
Vitória	2016	Série A	1	0	5	0	3	0	—		—		—		9	0
Vitória	Total		38	5	16	3	5	0	—		2	1	0	0	61	9
ASA (loan)	2013	Série B	—		3	0	—		—		—		—		3	0
Ventforet Kofu (loan)	2015	J1 League	1	0	—		—		0	0	—		—		1	0
Joinville (loan)	2015	Série A	3	0	—		0	0	—		0	0	—		3	0
Ceará	2016	Série B	8	1	—		3	0	—		—		—		11	1
Ansan Greeners	2017	K League 2	2	0	—		0	0	—		—		—		2	0
Londrina	2017	Série B	5	0	—		—		—		—		0	0	5	0
Ituano	2018	Paulista	—		3	0	—		—		—		—		3	0
Chiangrai United	2018	Thai League 1	13	2	—		6	2	3	2	—		—		22	6
Chiangrai United	2019	Thai League 1	30	11	—		4	2	3	1	2	0	1	0	40	14
Chiangrai United	Total		43	13	—		10	4	6	3	2	0	1	0	62	20
PT Prachuap	2020–21	Thai League 1	20	6	—		2	1	—		—		—		22	7
Suphanburi	2021–22	Thai League 1	11	6	—		3	1	0	0	—		—		14	7
Hajer	2022–23	Saudi First Division	9	0	—		0	0	—		—		—		9	0
Hanoi FC	2023	V.League 1	7	0	—		0	0	—		—		—		7	0
Career total			167	32	35	4	23	6	6	3	4	1	1	0	236	46

== Honours ==
Chiangrai United

- Thai League 1: 2019
- Thai FA Cup: 2018
- Thai League Cup: 2018

Hanoi FC

- Vietnamese Super Cup: 2022
