= Muangkrung F.C. =

Thai football club

Muangkrung เมืองกรุง
- Full name: Muangkrung Football Club สโมสรฟุตบอลเมืองกรุง
- Founded: 2016; 9 years ago
- Ground: ? Bangkok, Thailand
- League: 2018 Thailand Amateur League Northern Region

Muangkrung Football Club (Thai สโมสรฟุตบอลเมืองกรุง), is a Thai football club based in Chonburi, Thailand. The club is currently playing in the 2018 Thailand Amateur League Northern Region.

== Record ==
Season	League									FA Cup	League Cup	Top goalscorer	
Season	Division	P	W	D	L	F	A	Pts	Pos	FA Cup	League Cup	Name	Goals
2017	TA East	5	1	1	3	5	13	4	9th – 10th	Not Enter	Can't Enter		
2018	TA North	1	0	0	1	1	3	0	21st	R1	Can't Enter	Sakarin Thongsuk	1

Champions	Runners-up	Promoted	Relegated
