= Lenny (footballer) =

Brazilian footballer

Personal information
- Full name: Lenny Fernandes Coelho
- Date of birth: 23 March 1988 (age 38)
- Place of birth: Rio de Janeiro, Brazil
- Height: 1.71 m (5 ft 7 1/2 in)
- Position: Second striker

Team information
- Current team: Chiangmai (on ioan from Chiangrai United)
- Number: 10

Youth career
- 1998–2005: Fluminense

Senior career*
Years	Team	Apps	(Gls)
2005–2007	Fluminense	34	(2)
2007	→ Braga (loan)	1	(0)
2008–2010	Palmeiras (loan)	28	(0)
2011	→ Figueirense (loan)	1	(7)
2012	→ Desportivo Brasil (loan)	0	(0)
2013	→ Boavista	4	(1)
2013	Ventforet Kofu	0	(0)
2013	Madureira	0	(0)
2014	Atlético Sorocaba	1	(0)
2015–2016	Boavista	2	(0)
2018–	Chiangrai United	0	(0)
2018–	→ Chiangmai (loan)	1	(0)
- * Club domestic league appearances and goals as of 11 March 2015

Lenny Fernandes Coelho (born 23 March 1988), simply known as Lenny, is a retired Brazilian footballer who played as a second striker. Lenny left Fluminense in January 2008 for R$1.5 million. Palmeiras, associated with Desportivo Brasil (owned by Traffic Group), signed him. On 9 May 2013, he signed a deal with Campeonato Brasileiro Série C club Madureira.

== Honours ==
=== Fluminense ===
- Brazilian Cup: 2007

=== Palmeiras ===
- São Paulo State Championship: 2008
