= Tatree Seeha =

Thai footballer

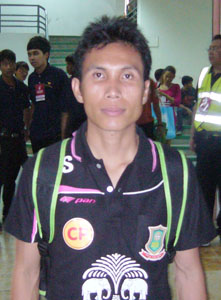

Personal information
- Full name: Tatree Seeha
- Date of birth: 7 January 1983 (age 43)
- Place of birth: Nakhon Phanom, Thailand
- Height: 1.71 m (5 ft 7 in)
- Position: Right winger

Senior career*
| Years | Team | Apps | (Gls) |
| 2006–2014 | Army United | 154 | (33) |
| 2013 | → Nakhon Ratchasima (loan) | 0 | (0) |
| 2014–2015 | Sisaket | 46 | (8) |
| 2016–2017 | Nongbua Pitchaya | 21 | (2) |
| 2018 | Sisaket | 12 | (1) |
| 2019 | Bankhai United | 29 | (16) |
| 2020–2022 | Nakhon Ratchasima United | 45 | (13) |
| Total | | 207 | (73) |
- * Club domestic league appearances and goals

Tatree Seeha (Thai: ธาตรี สีหา, born January 7, 1983) is a Thai retired professional footballer who plays as a right winger.
