= Wanit Jaisaen =

Thai footballer

Personal information
- Full name: Wanit Jaisaen
- Date of birth: 25 July 1992 (age 34)
- Place of birth: Bangkok, Thailand
- Height: 1.72 m (5 ft 7 1/2 in)
- Position: Striker

Team information
- Current team: Roi Et PB United

Youth career
- 2010–2011: Chonburi

Senior career*
Years	Team	Apps	(Gls)
2012–2016	Chonburi	12	(3)
2013	→ Songkhla United (loan)	18	(0)
2014	→ Bangkok (loan)	15	(5)
2015–2016	→ Prachuap (loan)	10	(1)
2017	Sisaket	12	(2)
2018	Trat	21	(5)
2019	Thai Honda	29	(3)
2020–2021	Sisaket	20	(2)
2021–2022	Nakhon Si United	25	(6)
2022–2024	Mahasarakham SBT	51	(15)
2024-	Roi Et PB United	0	(0)

International career
2014–2015	Thailand U23	3	(0)
- * Club domestic league appearances and goals as of 6 May 2023

Wanit Jaisaen (Thai: วานิช ใจแสน, born 25 July 1992) is a Thai professional footballer who plays as a striker for Thai League 3 club Roi Et PB United

== Honours ==
=== Club ===
Mahasarakham SBT

- Thai League 3 Northeastern Region: 2022–23
