= Greg Houla =

French footballer (born 1988)

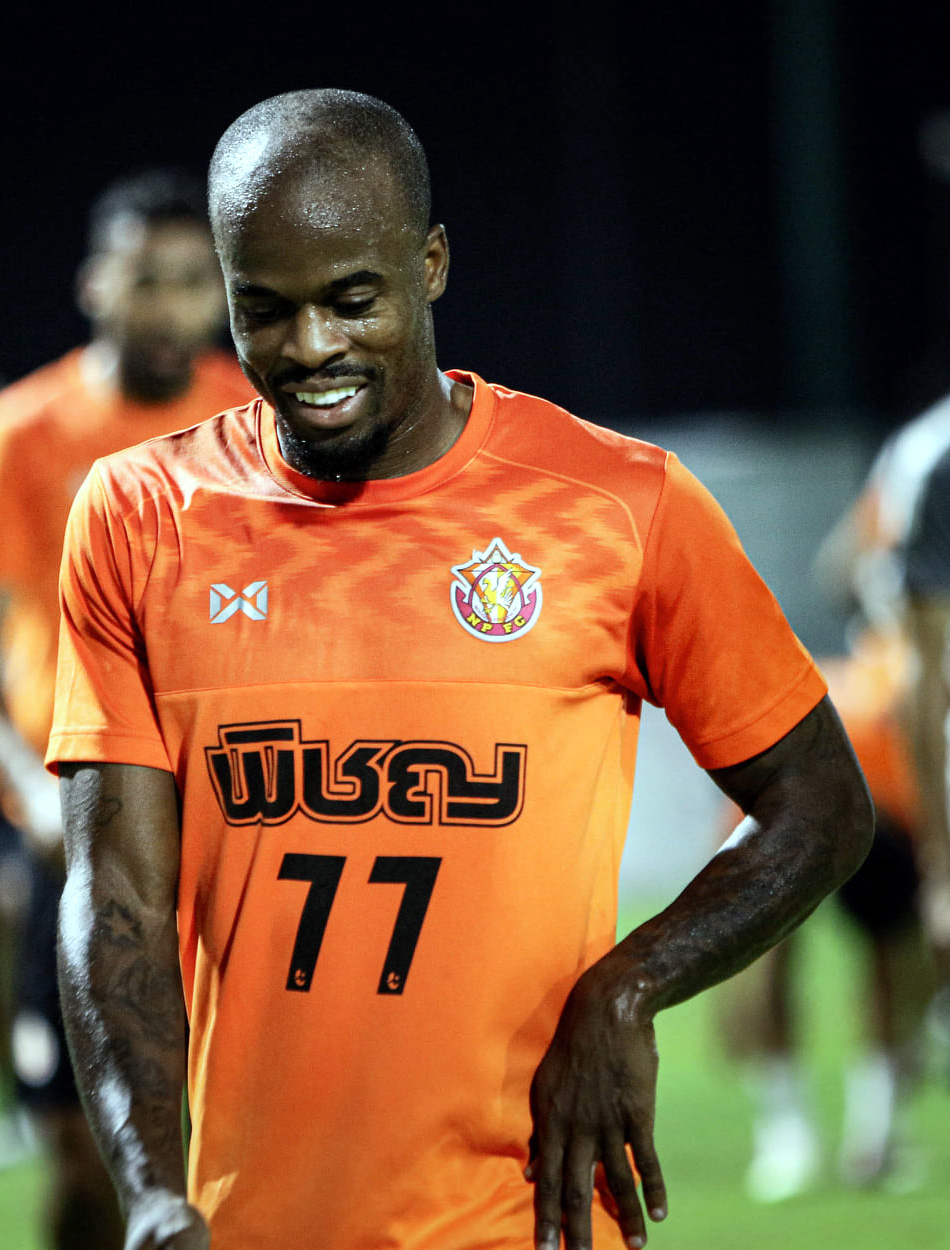
- Houla playing for Nongbua Pitchaya in 2021

Personal information
- Date of birth: 19 July 1988 (age 38)
- Place of birth: Amiens, France
- Height: 1.75 m (5 ft 9 in)
- Position: Winger

Senior career*
Years	Team	Apps	(Gls)
2007–2008	Guingamp B	6	(0)
2008–2009	Rapid de Menton	2	(0)
2009	Saint-Brieuc	5	(0)
2009–2011	La Vitréenne	25	(3)
2011–2013	Luçon	42	(21)
2013–2015	Chamois Niortais	61	(5)
2015	Ergotelis	13	(1)
2015–2017	Orléans	37	(5)
2017	Les Herbiers VF	14	(3)
2017–2018	US Créteil	11	(1)
2018–2019	Air Force United	30	(11)
2019–2020	Police Tero	28	(10)
2020–2021	Nongbua Pitchaya	14	(6)
2022	Kasetsart	13	(6)
2022	Udon Thani	14	(5)
2023	Chainat Hornbill	12	(4)
2023–2025	Nakhon Ratchasima	59	(20)
2025	Chonburi	0	(0)
- * Club domestic league appearances and goals as of 15 June 2025

Greg Houla (born 19 July 1988) is a French professional footballer who plays as an attacking midfielder or a striker.

== Honour ==
Nongbua Pitchaya

- Thai League 2 Champions: 2020–21

Nakhon Ratchasima

- Thai League 2 Champions: 2023–24
