= Erivelto (footballer, born 1988) =

Brazilian footballer

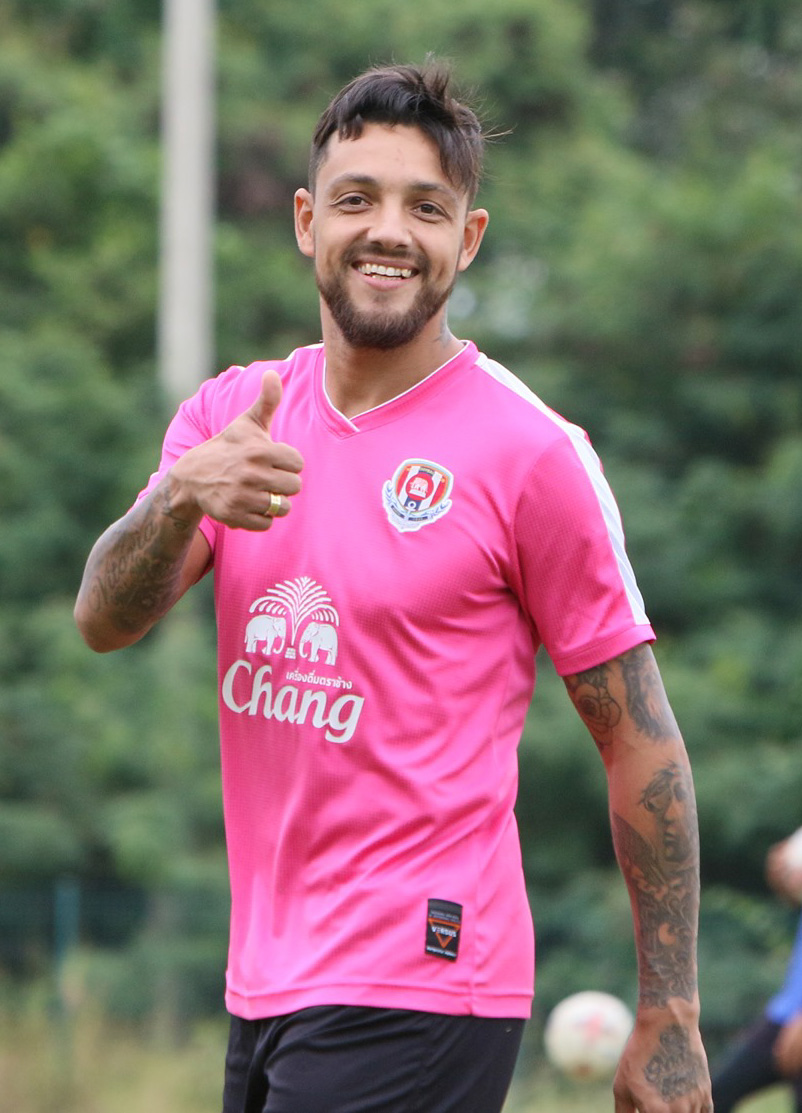
- Erivelto Emiliano da Silva playing for Royal Thai Navy.

Personal information
- Full name: Erivelto Emiliano da Silva
- Date of birth: 1 October 1988 (age 38)
- Place of birth: Bezerros, Brazil
- Height: 1.84 m (6 ft 0 in)
- Position: Striker

Team information
- Current team: Bankhai United
- Number: 32

Youth career
- Guarani

Senior career*
Years	Team	Apps	(Gls)
2009	Guarani	0	(0)
2010	Mixto	5	(1)
2011	Palmeiras B	6	(1)
2012	Batatais	4	(0)
2012–2013	Guaratinguetá	3	(0)
2013	Central SC	7	(3)
2014	Madureira	0	(0)
2014–2015	Sporting Covilhã	42	(23)
2015–2016	Al-Mesaimeer	20	(8)
2016–2017	Boavista	8	(0)
2017	Sporting Covilhã	18	(8)
2018	Army United	26	(14)
2019	JL Chiangmai United	17	(8)
2019	Udon Thani	16	(5)
2020	Royal Thai Navy	12	(8)
2021	Chainat Hornbill	11	(6)
2021–2022	Nakhon Si United	19	(12)
2022	Pattaya Dolphins United	6	(2)
2023	Mahasarakham SBT	16	(8)
2024	Phrae United	15	(4)
2024	Phatthalung	10	(3)
2025–	Bankhai United	0	(0)
- * Club domestic league appearances and goals as of 21 January 2025

Erivelto Emiliano da Silva (born 1 October 1988), known as Erivelto, is a Brazilian professional footballer who lastly played as a striker for Thai League 3 club Bankhai United.

== Honours ==
=== Club ===
Mahasarakham SBT

- Thai League 3 Northeastern Region: 2022–23
