= Chiangrai United F.C. =

Association football club in Thailand

Chiangrai United เชียงราย ยูไนเต็ด
- Full name: Chiangrai United Football Club สโมสรฟุตบอลเชียงราย ยูไนเต็ด
- Nicknames: The Beetles (กว่างโซ้งมหาภัย)
- Short name: CHR
- Founded: 2009; 17 years ago
- Ground: Singha Chiangrai Stadium; Chiang Rai, Thailand
- Capacity: 12,000
- President: Miti Tiyapairat
- Head coach: Worawut Wangsawad; Miti Tiyapairat
- League: Thai League 1
- 2025–26: Thai League 1, 7th of 16
- Website: https://www.chiangrai-united.com/
Home colours	Away colours

Chiangrai United Football Club (Thai: สโมสรฟุตบอลเชียงราย ยูไนเต็ด) (currently known as Singha Chiangrai United due to sponsorship reasons), is a professional football club based in Chiangrai Province, Thailand's northernmost province. The club currently competes in the Thai League 1. The club is also known as "The Beetles".

Chiangrai United has won one Thai League 1 title, 1 Thai League 2 title, 3 Thai FA Cup, 1 Thai League Cup and 2 Thailand Champions Cup in the club history.

== History ==
=== First title in debut season ===
In 2009, Chiangrai United was founded and joined the newly created Thailand football setup and started in the third division league, the 2009 Regional League Division 2 Northern Region. Chiangrai United duly came out on top come to the end of the regular league season, thus claiming their first-ever championship and also crowned as the first-ever winners of the Regional League Northern Division where Watcharakorn Klaitin scored 19 goals in the season and thus becoming the only player in the club history to finished as the top scorer with more goals for the club in a season.

On winning the championship, Chiangrai United entered the 2009 Regional League Division 2, an end of season mini-league for all 5 Regional League Division 2 championship-winning teams, and finished as runners-up and promoted to Thai Division 1 League.

=== Second Division and top flight promotion (2010–2016) ===
In 2010, Chiangrai United finished 3rd in the Thai Division 1 League and first-ever promoted to the top tier Thai League 1. Chiangrai United than played their first ever top flight season in the 2011 season where the club finished in 10th place

In 2016, Chiangrai United made a deal with Jarken Group, initiating a holistic marketing strategy which included business development and strengthening management structures to promote a positive image of the Chiangrai United Sports Passions as a brand to make Chiangrai United become professional and sustainable. The strategy for this deal is to design to promote Chaingrai United to become the big name club in Thailand.

=== Tasting success with major honours (2017–2022) ===
==== Back-to-back Thai FA Cup winners (2017–2018) ====

2017 Thai FA Cup Final starting lineup Chiangrai United 4 – 2 Bangkok United

In 2017, Chiangrai United continued to make agreements with sponsors to improve the club's professional image and attract Tanaboon Kesarat. They also secured Brazilian players such as; Vander Luiz, Felipe Azevedo, Henrique Silva. Under Brazilian head coach Alexandre Gama, Chiangrai United was victorious in the 2017 Thai FA Cup final after defeating Bangkok United 4–2. This proved to be a case of redemption for Chiangrai United as winning the first piece of silverware in club-history, three days after losing to Muangthong United in the 2017 Thai League Cup final.

Chiangrai United than qualified to the 2018 AFC Champions League qualication phase where they defeated Indonesian club Bali United 3–2 in a preliminary round 2 before going on to lose against Chinese club Shanghai SIPG 1–0 in a final play-offs round for the AFC Champions League group stages.

==== Domestic double (2018) ====
In the 2018 Thai League Cup final, William Henrique scored the only goal for the match which sealed Chiangrai United to win the League Cup on 20 October 2018. Seven days later, Chiangrai United than played in the 2018 Thai FA Cup Final, Chiangrai United went on to shock eventual Thai League 1 champions Buriram United at the Supachalasai Stadium where the beetles won 3–2 victory, in which Bill scored a hat-trick for the club in the final. Chiangrai United went on to win a domestic double where the club also notably win the 2018 Thailand Champions Cup

==== Thai League 1 champions (2019) ====

Usual starting line-up of the 2019 League 1 winning team

Chiangrai United than qualified to the 2019 AFC Champions League qualification phase where they face against Myanmar club Yangon United winning them 3–1 in a qualifying preliminary round 2 advancing to the next round facing against Japanese club Sanfrecce Hiroshima in a qualifying play-offs round for the AFC Champions League group stages; the match finished 0–0 after extra time, with Chiangrai United narrowly losing the penalty shoot-out 4–3 at the Hiroshima Big Arch.

In October 2019, after the announcement of the appointment of Brazilian Ailton Silva as the new head coach, Chiangrai United went on to win the Thai League 1 for the first time. Chiangrai United and Buriram United ended up with identical 58 points from 30 matches. However, they were declared the winners of the league on the basis of a better head-to-head record, Chiangrai United held Buriram to a goalless draw away in the first leg in April 2019 then thrashed the Thai giants 4–0 at home in July 2019, Chiangrai United is the third club to win the top flight after Buriram United and Muangthong United since the country's top flight league was revamped in 2009. The side is commented to fare well in most big games, with compactness and discipline springing surprises. Instead of being burdened with keeping possession, they stifled opponents with a rehearsed repertoire of both defensive and pressing moves, topped off with lethal counter-attacks.

==== AFC Champions League debut (2020) ====
With Chiangrai United winning the 2019 Thai League 1 title, the club gains automatic slot into the 2019 AFC Champions League thus being drawn in Group E alongside Australian club Melbourne Victory, Chinese club Beijing Guoan and Korean club FC Seoul. Chiangrai United makes it debut in the tournament losing to Melbourne Victory 1–0 on 11 February 2020 at the AAMI Park. The club than recorded their first win on 27 November 2020 with Bill scoring a brace to defeat FC Seoul 2–1 at home. Chiangrai United than bowed out from the tournament after ending at the bottom of the group stage with 5 points.

Chiangrai United than qualified to the 2021 AFC Champions League where they were drawn in group H in a centralised venue in Tashkent, Uzbekistan alongside Japanese club Gamba Osaka, Korean club Jeonbuk Hyundai Motors and Singaporean club Tampines Rovers. Chiangrai United went on to have their highest ever finished in the club AFC tournament history with 8 points but it wasn't enough thus the club was knockout from the group stage.

== Team image ==
=== Club name history ===
Year	Sponsor	Club name
2016–2017	(Thailand) Singha	Singha Chiangrai United
2021–2023	(Thailand) Leo	Leo Chiangrai United
2023–present	(Thailand) Singha	Singha Chiangrai United

== Kit suppliers and shirt sponsors ==
Period	Kit manufacturer	Main sponsor
2009–2010	In house production	(Thailand) Singha
2011–2013	(Thailand) DEFFO	(Thailand) Leo
2014–2015	In house production	(Thailand) Leo
2016–2017	In house production	(Thailand) Singha
2018	(Germany) Puma	(Thailand) Singha
2019	(Thailand) FBT	(Thailand) Leo
2020–2023	(Thailand) Grand Sport	(Thailand) Leo
2023–present	(Thailand) Grand Sport	(Thailand) Singha

== Academy development ==
Chiangrai United opened its first youth academies in 2012. The club also regularly supplies the Thai national youth teams and Chiangrai first team squad with local talent such as Ekanit Panya, Chotipat Poomkaew, Apirak Worawong, Pharadon Pattanapol, Sarawut Yodyinghathaikul and Thakdanai Jaihan. Chiangrai youth academies play in Thailand Youth League.

== Stadium ==
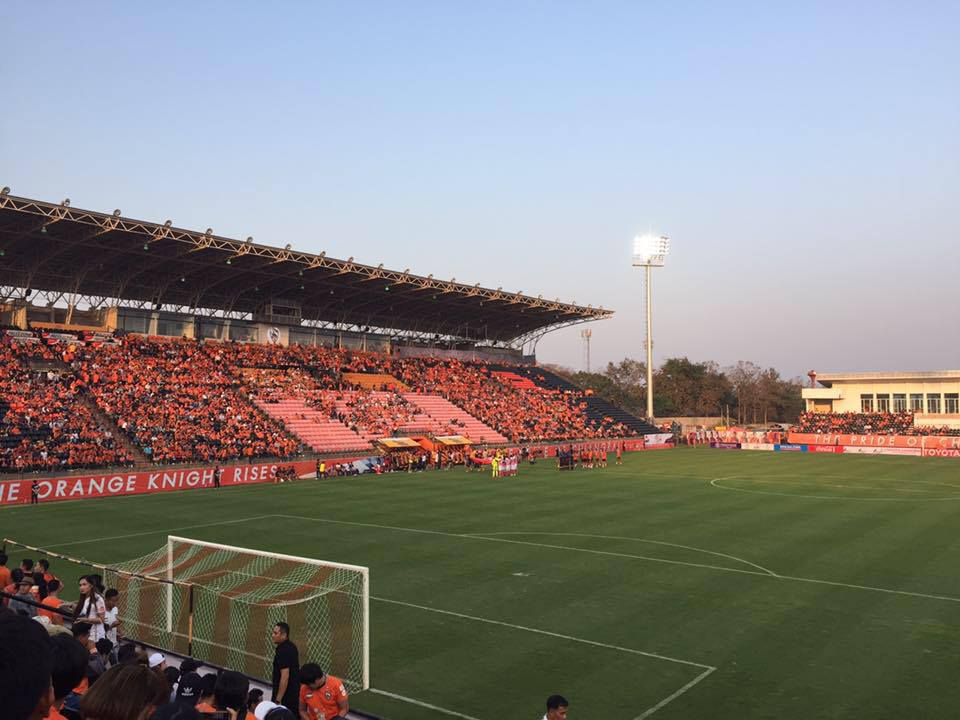
Singha Chiangrai Stadium in 2017

Main articles: Singha Chiangrai Stadium

Chiangrai United have played their home matches at the Singha Chiangrai Stadium since 2012. Located in Chiang Rai Province near Mae Fah Luang International Airport, the stadium has a seating capacity of approximately 12,000 spectators. The venue serves as the club's home ground for domestic league and cup competitions and is also known by its nickname, the "Beetles Nest", reflecting the club's identity as the Beetles.

== Players ==
=== First team squad ===
Note: Flags indicate national team as defined under FIFA eligibility rules; some limited exceptions apply. Players may hold more than one non-FIFA nationality.

No.	Pos.	Nation	Player
1	GK	THA	Apirak Worawong
2	DF	THA	Banphakit Phormmanee
3	DF	THA	Tanasak Srisai
4	DF	THA	Piyaphon Phanichakul
5	DF	THA	Marco Ballini (on loan from BG Pathum United)
6	MF	THA	Settasit Suvannaseat
7	MF	THA	Sanukran Thinjom (on loan from PT Prachuap)
8	MF	BRA	Wanderson
9	MF	SGP	Harhys Stewart
10	MF	BRA	Dudu
11	FW	BRA	Robinho
15	DF	THA	Pattarapon Suksakit
17	MF	THA	Gionata Verzura (captain)
19	FW	BRA	Gustavo Schutz
20	MF	THA	Thakdanai Jaihan

No.	Pos.	Nation	Player
21	FW	BRA	Douglas Souza
22	FW	THA	Thapoppon Butkaew
23	DF	BRA	Victor Cardozo
27	GK	THA	Sawich Klaithin
28	DF	BRA	Hélio
32	MF	THA	Montree Promsawat
33	MF	POR	Jose Gomes
34	GK	THA	Sirassawut Wongruankhum
37	MF	THA	Phoptham Pornkod
39	DF	THA	Adithep Phuangphaka
47	DF	THA	Rachata Tongdonpum
59	GK	THA	Apison Wanchlam
71	MF	THA	Thanakit Kaewrungroj
80	MF	THA	Sansern Limwatthana
90	MF	BRA	Wendell
92	DF	THA	Thawatchai Inprakhon (on loan from BG Pathum United)

=== Out on loan ===
Note: Flags indicate national team as defined under FIFA eligibility rules; some limited exceptions apply. Players may hold more than one non-FIFA nationality.

No.	Pos.	Nation	Player
33	DF	THA	Pharadon Pattanapol (at (Thailand) Trat)
35	FW	THA	Rawat Kharop (at (Thailand) Chiangrai City)

== Management and staff ==
Position	Name
Head coach	(Thailand) Worawut Wangsawad (Thailand) Miti Tiyapairat
Goalkeeper coach	(Brazil) Arnaldo Souza

== Honours ==
Type	Honours	Titles	Seasons
League	Thai League 1/Firstdivision	1	2019
League	Thai League 2/Second division	1	2010
League	Regional League Northern Region	1	2009
Cup	Thai FA Cup	3	2017, 2018, 2020–21
Cup	Thai League Cup	1	2018
Cup	Thailand Champions Cup	2	2018, 2020

Bold is for those competition that are currently active.

=== Double ===
Thai FA Cup and Thailand Champions Cup: 2020–21

=== Treble ===
Thai FA Cup, Thai League Cup and Thailand Champions Cup: 2018

== Award winners ==
=== Domestic ===
- Most Valuable Player
  - (Thailand) Phitiwat Sukjitthammakul (2019)
- Coach of the Season
  - (Brazil) Ailton Silva (2019)

== Records and statistics ==
As of 16 October 2026.

Top 10 all-time appearances
Rank	Player	Years	Club appearances
1	(Thailand) Sivakorn Tiatrakul	2017–2024	250
3	(Thailand) Suriya Singmui	2017–2024	224
2	(Thailand) Phitiwat Sukjitthammakul	2017–2022	206
4	(Thailand) Shinnaphat Leeaoh	2017–2023	206
5	(Thailand) Tanasak Srisai	2018–present	195
6	(Thailand) Piyaphon Phanichakul	2016–2020, 2024–present	189
7	(Thailand) Sanukran Thinjom	2020–2024, 2025–present	181
8	(Thailand) Apirak Worawong	2014–present	170
9	(Thailand) Gionata Verzura	2019–present	161
10	(Thailand) Akarawin Sawasdee	2017–2023, 2024	152

Top 10 all-time scorers
Rank	Player	Club appearances	Total goals
1	(Brazil) Bill	142	94
2	(Thailand) Akarawin Sawasdee	152	31
3	(Thailand) Sivakorn Tiatrakul	250	28
4	(Brazil) Felipe Azevedo	38	27
5	(Brazil) Renan Marques	67	26
6	(Brazil) Victor Cardozo	102	23
7	(Brazil) William Henrique	62	20
8	(Brazil) Felipe Amorim	85	19
9	(Thailand) Piyaphon Phanichakul	189	18
10	(Brazil) Leandro Assumpção	45	17

- Biggest wins: 19–0 vs Sing Pathum Thani (29 October 2025)
- Heaviest defeats: 7–0 vs Buriram United (15 January 2025)
- Youngest goal scorers: Ekanit Panya ~ 15 years 11 months 27 days old (On 18 October 2015 vs Muangthong United)
- Oldest goal scorers: (Brazil) Antônio Cláudio ~ 40 years 1 month 17 days old (On 2 June 2013 vs Chonburi)
- Youngest ever debutant: Ekanit Panya ~ 15 years 11 months 5 days old (On 26 September 2015 vs Sisaket)
- Oldest ever player: (Brazil) Antônio Cláudio ~ 40 years 2 month 21 days old (On 7 July 2013 vs TOT)

== Former players ==
=== International capped players ===
AFC/OFC.: (Australia) Mark Bridge; (China) Guo Tianyu; (Indonesia) Greg Nwokolo; (Indonesia) Victor Igbonefo; (Myanmar) Kyaw Ko Ko; (Myanmar) Win Naing Tun; (Singapore) Harhys Stewart; (Singapore) Jordan Emaviwe; (Singapore) Zulfahmi Arifin; (South Korea) Cho Ji-hun; (South Korea) Lee Jung-moon; (South Korea) Lee Yong-rae; (Timor-Leste) Émerson Cesário	CAF.: (Liberia) Murphy Nagbe; (Namibia) Lazarus Kaimbi	UEFA.: (England) Kyle Nix; (Netherlands) Rutger Worm	CONMEBOL/ CONCACAF.: (Brazil) Rafael Coelho; (El Salvador) Nelson Bonilla

== Managerial history ==
Name	Period	Honours
(Thailand) Sarith Wutchuay	2009	
(Thailand) Thawatchai Damrong-Ongtrakul	2009	
(Thailand) Apisit Imampai	December 2009–February 2010	
(Thailand) Kajohn Punnaves	February 2010–May 2010	
(Thailand) Rungsimun Songkrohtham	May 2010–July 2010	
(Brazil) Stefano Cugurra	July 2010–June 2013	
(Netherlands) Henk Wisman	July 2013–September 2013	
(Thailand) Anurak Srikerd	September 2013–October 2013	
(Thailand) Teerasak Po-on	November 2013–November 2016	
(Brazil) Alexandre Gama	December 2016–October 2018	– 2017 Thai FA Cup – 2018 Thai FA Cup – 2018 Thailand Champions Cup
(Brazil) Jose Alves Borges	October 2018–February 2019	
(Brazil) Ailton Silva	February 2019–November 2019	– 2019 Thai League 1
(Japan) Masami Taki	December 2019 – October 2020	– 2020 Thailand Champions Cup
(Brazil) Emerson Pereira (interim)	October 2020–April 2021	– 2020–21 Thai FA Cup
(Brazil) Emerson Pereira	April 2021–December 2022	– 2020–21 Thai FA Cup
(Brazil) Gabriel Magalhães	December 2022–May 2024	
(Spain) Xavi Moro	June 2024–November 2024	
(Thailand) Piyaphon Phanichakul	November 2024–December 2024	
(Brazil) Wilson James Dos Santos (interim)	January 2025–February 2025	
(Thailand) Worawut Wangsawad	February 2025–April 2025	
(Thailand) Sirisak Yodyardthai	August 2025–July 2026	
(Thailand) Worawut Wangsawad	July 2026–present	

== Season by season record ==
Season	League									FA Cup	League Cup	Thailand Champions Cup	AFC Champions League	Top scorer	
Season	Division	P	W	D	L	F	A	Pts	Pos	FA Cup	League Cup	Thailand Champions Cup	AFC Champions League	Name	Goals
2009	DIV 2 Northern	20	17	3	0	62	16	54	1st	–	–	–	–	Watcharakorn Klaitin	19
2009	RL	8	3	3	2	12	11	12	2nd	–	–	–	–	Watcharakorn Klaitin	19
2010	DIV 1	30	15	8	7	44	32	53	3rd	R3	R2	–	–	Wasan Natasan	13
2011	TPL	34	11	11	12	47	52	44	10th	R4	QF	–	–	Wasan Natasan	18
2012	TPL	34	11	11	12	40	47	44	9th	SF	R3	–	–	Nantawat Tansopa	8
2013	TPL	32	8	10	14	32	45	34	11th	QF	R3	–	–	Leandro Assumpção	9
2014	TPL	38	13	16	9	55	47	55	7th	SF	R4	–	–	Renan Marques	17
2015	TPL	34	12	8	14	42	57	44	9th	QF	R1	–	–	Renan Marques	10
2016	TL	31	13	6	12	42	43	45	8th	R3	R2	–	–	Wellington Bruno	10
2017	T1	34	18	6	10	67	42	60	4th	W	RU	–	–	Felipe Azevedo	18
2018	T1	34	15	10	9	52	36	55	5th	W	W	W	PO	Bill	9
2019	T1	30	16	10	4	53	28	58	1st	QF	SF	RU	PO	Bill	14
2020–21	T1	30	16	6	8	48	32	54	4th	W	–	W	GS	Bill	18
2021–22	T1	30	13	8	9	33	35	47	5th	R3	SF	RU	GS	Bill	8
2022–23	T1	30	12	8	10	44	42	44	5th	QF	R1	–	GS	Victor Cardozo	11
2023–24	T1	30	8	10	12	31	35	34	11th	R2	QF	–	–	Bill	7
2024–25	T1	30	11	3	16	33	51	36	11th	R3	QF	–	–	Jordan Emaviwe; Sittichok Kannoo	5
2025–26	T1	30	9	13	8	36	37	40	7th			–	–	Itsuki Enomoto	11

Champions	Runners-up	Third place	Promoted	Relegated

- P = Played
- W = Games won
- D = Games drawn
- L = Games lost
- F = Goals for
- A = Goals against
- Pts = Points
- Pos = Final position
- N/A = No answer
- TL = Thai League 1
- QR1 = First Qualifying Round
- QR2 = Second Qualifying Round
- QR3 = Third Qualifying Round
- QR4 = Fourth Qualifying Round
- RInt = Intermediate Round
- R1 = Round 1
- R2 = Round 2
- R3 = Round 3
- R4 = Round 4
- R5 = Round 5
- R6 = Round 6
- GR = Group stage
- QF = Quarter-finals
- SF = Semi-finals
- RU = Runners-up
- S = Shared
- W = Winners

== Continental record ==
Season	Competition	Round	Club	Home	Away	Aggregate
2018	AFC Champions League	Preliminary round 2	(Indonesia) Bali United	2–1 (a.e.t.)		
2018	AFC Champions League	Play-off round	(China) Shanghai Port	0–1		
2019	AFC Champions League	Preliminary round 2	(Myanmar) Yangon United	3–1		
2019	AFC Champions League	Play-off round	(Japan) Sanfrecce Hiroshima	0–0 (a.e.t.) (3–4 p)		
2020	AFC Champions League	Group E	(Australia) Melbourne Victory	2–2	0–1	4th out of 4
2020	AFC Champions League	Group E	(China) Beijing Guoan	0–1	1–1	4th out of 4
2020	AFC Champions League	Group E	(South Korea) FC Seoul	2–1	0–5	4th out of 4
2021	AFC Champions League	Group H	(South Korea) Jeonbuk Hyundai Motors	1–3	1–2	3rd out of 4
2021	AFC Champions League	Group H	(Singapore) Tampines Rovers	1–0	3–0	3rd out of 4
2021	AFC Champions League	Group H	(Japan) Gamba Osaka	1–1	1–1	3rd out of 4
2022	AFC Champions League	Group J	(Hong Kong) Kitchee	2–3	0–1	3rd out of 3
2022	AFC Champions League	Group J	(Japan) Vissel Kobe	0–0	0–6	3rd out of 3

Thai FA Cup, Thai League Cup and Thailand Champions Cup: 2018
