= Ailton Silva =

Ailton Silva may refer to:

- Ailton dos Santos Silva (born 1966), Brazilian football manager
- Ailton Ferreira Silva (born 1995), Brazilian footballer
