= José Ramón Gómez =

José Ramón Gómez may refer to:

- José Ramón Gómez Besteiro (born 1967), Spanish politician
- José Ramón Gómez Leal (born 1977), Mexican politician
- José Ramón Gómez Fouz (born 1952), Spanish boxer and writer
- José Ramón Gómez (footballer), Mexican footballer, competed in 2021–22 Serie A de México season
- José Ramón Gómez (volleyball), Cuban volleyballer, competed in 2023 Men's U23 Pan-American Volleyball Cup

== See also ==
- José Gómez (disambiguation)
