= Chinnachot Natasan =

Thai footballer

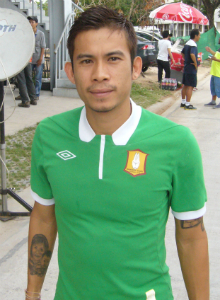

Personal information
- Full name: Wasan Natasan
- Date of birth: May 2, 1982 (age 44)
- Place of birth: Chiang Rai, Thailand
- Height: 1.69 m (5 ft 6 1/2 in)
- Position: Forward

Senior career*
| Years | Team | Apps | (Gls) |
| 2003–2008 | Bangkok Bank | 75 | (22) |
| 2009–2010 | Osotspa Saraburi | 18 | (4) |
| 2010–2013 | Chiangrai United | 53 | (35) |
| 2013 | Bangkok Glass | 3 | (0) |
| 2014 | Phuket | 28 | (12) |
| 2015–2016 | Osotspa Samut Prakan | 11 | (0) |
| 2016 | Chiangrai City | 8 | (3) |
| 2017 | Kopoon Warrior | 3 | (0) |
| 2018–2019 | Rajpracha | | |

International career
| 1998–1999 | Thailand U17 | 11 | (5) |

Managerial career
- 2016–2017: Kopoon Warrior
- 2018–2019: Rajpracha
- 2020–2021: Grakcu Sai Mai United
- 2022: Grakcu Sai Mai United
- * Club domestic league appearances and goals

Chinnachot Natasan (Thai: ชินโชติ นาทะสันต์, born 2 May 1982), simply known as his old name Wasan Natasan (Thai: วสันต์ นาทะสันต์) is a Thai former professional footballer. He was voted the best forward in the 2010 Thai Division 1 League. He was also Chiangrai's top goalscorer with 12 goals.

== Managerial career ==
In 2016, Natasan took his first managerial job as the manager for Kopoon Warrior F.C. He took the job without pay, as it was a newly started club.

== Personal life ==
Natasan is married with two daughters. His eldest daughter plans on becoming a professional football player, training with Muangthong United.

After retiring, Natasan took up the hobby of collecting amulets.
