= Worawut Wangsawad =

Thai footballer and coach (born 1981)

Personal information
- Full name: Worawut Wangsawad
- Date of birth: 16 September 1981 (age 45)
- Place of birth: Bangkok, Thailand
- Height: 1.67 m (5 ft 5 1/2 in)
- Position: Attacking midfielder

Team information
- Current team: Chiangrai United (head coach)

Senior career*
Years	Team	Apps	(Gls)
2001–2007	Osotspa	104	(23)
2009	TTM Phichit	25	(5)
2010	Thai Port	13	(1)
2011–2012	Suphanburi	22	(0)
2013	Bangkok	5	(0)
Total		169	(29)

International career
2003–2004	Thailand	3	(0)

Managerial career
- 2019: Chiangmai
- 2025: Chiangrai United
- 2025–2026: Chiangrai United (assistant)
- 2026–: Chiangrai United
- * Club domestic league appearances and goals as of 14 November 2008

Worawut Wangsawad (Thai: วรวุฒิ วังสวัสดิ์) is a Thai professional football coach and former player who is the head coach Thai League 1 club Chiangrai United.

== Managerial statistics ==
As of match played 22 November 2026

Managerial record by team and tenure
Team	From	To	Record				
Team	From	To	P	W	D	L	Win %
Chiangrai United	12 July 2026	Present	9	2	3	4	22.2
Total			9	2	3	4	22.2

== Honours ==
=== Club ===
Osotspa F.C.

- Kor Royal Cup Winner (2) : 2002–2003, 2007

Thai Port F.C.

- Thai League Cup Winner (1) : 2010
