= Kim Ho-yeong =

South Korean footballer (born 1997)

Personal information
- Date of birth: 26 April 1997 (age 29)
- Place of birth: Ansan, Gyeonggi, South Korea
- Height: 1.85 m (6 ft 1 in)
- Position: Defender

Team information
- Current team: Kamatamare Sanuki
- Number: 28

Youth career
- 2013–2015: Gwacheon HS
- 2016–2018: Yeungnam University

Senior career*
Years	Team	Apps	(Gls)
2019	Mokpo City	0	(0)
2019–2020	Samut Prakan City	7	(0)
2020–	Kamatamare Sanuki	25	(2)
- * Club domestic league appearances and goals as of 17:04, 28 June 2020 (UTC)

- Kim Ho-yeong
- Hangul: 김호영
- RR: Gim Hoyeong
- MR: Kim Hoyŏng

Kim Ho-yeong (Korean: 김호영; born 26 April 1997) is a South Korean footballer currently playing as a defender for Kamatamare Sanuki.

== Club statistics ==
As of 28 June 2020.

Club	Season	League			National Cup		League Cup		Other		Total	
Club	Season	Division	Apps	Goals	Apps	Goals	Apps	Goals	Apps	Goals	Apps	Goals
Mokpo City	2019	N-League	0	0	0	0	–		0	0	0	0
Samut Prakan City	2019	Toyota Thai League	7	0	0	0	–		0	0	7	0
Kamatamare Sanuki	2020	J3 League	25	2	0	0	–		0	0	25	2
Career total			32	2	0	0	0	0	0	0	32	2
