= 2019 Thai League 1 =

Thai League 1
- Season: 2019
- Dates: 22 February – 26 October 2019
- Champions: Chiangrai United
- Relegated: Chainat Hornbill; Chiangmai
- AFC Champions League: Chiangrai United; Buriram United; Port
- ASEAN Club Championship: Chiangrai United; Prachuap
- Matches: 240
- Goals: 648 (2.7 per match)
- Top goalscorer: Lonsana Doumbouya (20 goals)
- Biggest home win: 6 goals difference Buriram United 6–0 Ratchaburi Mitr Phol (17 August 2019)
- Biggest away win: 3 goals difference Muangthong United 0–3 Samut Prakan City (11 May 2019); Samut Prakan City 0–3 PTT Rayong (13 July 2019); Samut Prakan City 0–3 Chiangrai United (11 August 2019)
- Highest scoring: 12 goals scored Chonburi 7–5 Chiangmai (21 April 2019) *all-time league record
- Longest winning run: 5 matches Port
- Longest unbeaten run: 11 matches Chiangrai United
- Longest winless run: 8 matches Muangthong United
- Longest losing run: 4 matches Chiangmai; Muangthong United; Samut Prakan City; Trat
- Highest attendance: 32,538; Buriram United 3–1 Port (20 October 2019)
- Lowest attendance: 443; Chiangmai 1–3 Trat (18 August 2019)
- Total attendance: 1,367,681
- Average attendance: 5,699

The 2019 Thai League 1 is the 23rd season of the Thai League 1, the top Thai professional league for association football clubs, since its establishment in 1996, also known as Toyota Thai League due to the sponsorship deal with Toyota Motor Thailand. A total of 16 teams will compete in the league. The season began on 22 February 2019 and is scheduled to conclude on 27 October 2019.

Buriram United are the defending champions, while PTT Rayong, Trat and Chiangmai have entered as the promoted teams from the 2018 Thai League 2.

The 1st transfer window is from 26 November 2018 to 19 February 2019 while the 2nd transfer window is from 24 June 2019 to 19 July 2019.

Chiangrai United won the league for the first time in history, this is the first time since 2007 that neither Muangthong United nor Buriram United were not crowned champions.

== Changes from last season ==
=== Team changes ===
==== Promoted clubs ====
Promoted from the 2018 Thai League 2

- PTT Rayong
- Trat
- Chiangmai

==== Relegated clubs ====
Relegated from the 2018 Thai League 1

- Bangkok Glass
- Police Tero
- Navy
- Ubon United
- Air Force Central

==== Renamed clubs ====
- Pattaya United was renamed to Samut Prakan City, and relocated to Samut Prakan

== Teams ==
Locations of the 2019 Thai League teams
Football clubs in Bangkok Metropolitan Region

=== Stadium and locations ===
Note: Table lists in alphabetical order.

Team	Province	Stadium	Capacity	Ref.
Bangkok United	Pathum Thani	Thammasat Stadium	19,375	
Buriram United	Buriram	Chang Arena	32,600	
Chainat Hornbill	Chainat	Khao Plong Stadium	8,625	
Chiangmai	Chiangmai	700th Anniversary Stadium	20,000	
Chiangrai United	Chiangrai	Singha Stadium	13,000	
Chonburi	Chonburi	Chonburi Stadium	8,680	
Muangthong United	Nonthaburi	SCG Stadium	12,505	
Nakhon Ratchasima	Nakhon Ratchasima	80th Birthday Stadium	24,641	
Port	Bangkok	PAT Stadium	8,000	
PT Prachuap	Prachuap Khiri Khan	Sam Ao Stadium	5,000	
PTT Rayong	Rayong	PTT Stadium	12,161	
Ratchaburi Mitr Phol	Ratchaburi	Mitr Phol Stadium	10,000	
Samut Prakan City	Samut Prakan	Samut Prakarn SAT Stadium	5,130	
Sukhothai	Sukhothai	Thung Thalay Luang Stadium	8,000	
Suphanburi	Suphanburi	Suphan Buri Provincial Stadium	15,279	
Trat	Trat	Trat Provincial Stadium	5,000	

=== Stadium changes ===
- Due to Samut Prakan City relocation from Pattaya, they will use the Samut Prakarn Stadium, which will also be used by Samut Prakan whom play in Thai League 4.
- Chiangmai used the Singha Stadium in Chiangrai from August until September, returning to their home ground for the final game of the season.
- Chonburi used the Sattahip Navy Stadium in Chonburi for the visit of Chainat for the final game of the season.

=== Personnel and sponsoring ===
Note: Flags indicate national team as has been defined under FIFA eligibility rules. Players may hold more than one non-FIFA nationality.

Team	Head coach	Captain	Kit manufacturer	Shirt sponsors
Bangkok United	(Brazil) Alexandré Pölking	(Thailand) Anthony Ampaipitakwong	Ari	True; Huawei; Daikin; CP; Smart Heart; Toyota; Ziebart; Euro Cake
Buriram United	(Montenegro) Božidar Bandović	(Thailand) Suchao Nuchnum	Made by club (Domestic); Ari (Asia)	Chang; Grab; ITALTHAI; Coca-Cola; Muang Thai; King Power; Yamaha; Thai AirAsia; I-Mobile; TrueVision; CP; Amari Hotel; Jele
Chainat Hornbill	(Germany) Dennis Amato	(Thailand) Parinya Utapao	Warrix	Wangkanai; AirAsia; Kubota
Chiangmai	(Thailand) Surapong Kongthep	(Thailand) Suwannapat Kingkaew	Volt	Leo; Bangkok Airways
Chiangrai United	(Brazil) Ailton Silva	(Thailand) Tanasak Srisai	FBT	Leo; Bangkok Airways; TOA
Chonburi	(Thailand) Sasom Pobprasert	(Thailand) Kroekrit Thaweekarn	Nike	Chang; Euro Cake
Muangthong United	(Brazil) Alexandre Gama	(Thailand) Teerasil Dangda	Grand Sport	SCG; Yamaha; Coca-Cola; AIA; Herbalife Nutrition; I-Mobile; Gulf
Nakhon Ratchasima	(Thailand) Chalermwoot Sa-ngapol	(Thailand) Chalermpong Kerdkaew	Versus	Mazda; Leo; CP; Central Plaza; Gulf
Port	(Thailand) Choketawee Promrut	(Spain) David Rochela	Grand Sport	Muang Thai Insurance; AirAsia; CP
PT Prachuap	(Thailand) Thawatchai Damrong-Ongtrakul	(Thailand) Adul Muensamaan	Warrix	PTG; Euro Cake; 2Gear
PTT Rayong	(Thailand) Teerasak Po-on	(Thailand) Apipoo Suntornpanavej	Warrix	PTT Group
Ratchaburi Mitr Phol	(Thailand) Nuengrutai Srathongvian	(Thailand) Philip Roller	Made by club	Mitr Phol; Kubota; Chang; Euro Cake
Samut Prakan City	(Japan) Tetsuya Murayama	(Thailand) Peeradon Chamratsamee	Ari	Sanwa; AirAsia
Sukhothai	(Thailand) Pairoj Borwonwatanadilok	(Madagascar) John Baggio	Mawin	Chang; Carabao; CP
Suphanburi	(Nigeria) Adebayo Gbadebo	(Thailand) Natthaphong Samana	Warrix	Chang; True
Trat	(Thailand) Phayong Khunnaen	(Ivory Coast) Bireme Diouf	Grand Sport	CP; Chang

=== Managerial changes ===
Team	Outgoing manager	Manner of departure	Date of vacancy	Week	Table	Incoming manager
Trat	(Thailand) Dusit Chalermsan	Mutual consent	9 October 2018	Pre-season		(Thailand) Phayong Khunnaen
Sukhothai	(Thailand) Chalermwoot Sa-ngapol	End of contract	10 October 2018	Pre-season		(Serbia) Ljubomir Ristovski
Suphanburi	(Thailand) Pairoj Borwonwatanadilok	End of contract	11 October 2018	Pre-season		(Thailand) Totchtawan Sripan
Chiangrai United	(Brazil) Alexandre Gama	End of contract	28 October 2018	Pre-season		(Brazil) Jose Alves Borges
Ratchaburi Mitr Phol	(Tunisia) Lassaad Chabbi	End of contract	7 November 2018	Pre-season		(Spain) Manolo Márquez
Muangthong United	(Thailand) Uthai Boonmoh	End of caretaker role	22 November 2018	Pre-season		(Thailand) Pairoj Borwonwatanadilok
Ratchaburi Mitr Phol	(Spain) Manolo Márquez	Resigned	22 January 2019	Pre-season		(France) Stéphane Porato
Chiangrai United	(Brazil) Jose Alves Borges	Mutual consent	11 February 2019	Pre-season		(Brazil) Ailton Silva
Ratchaburi Mitr Phol	(France) Stéphane Porato	End of caretaker role	25 March 2019	4	13	(Italy) Marco Simone
Muangthong United	(Thailand) Pairoj Borwonwatanadilok	Resigned	31 March 2019	5	10	(South Korea) Yoon Jong-hwan
Samut Prakan City	(Thailand) Surapong Kongthep	Resigned	29 May 2019	13	3	(Japan) Tetsuya Murayama
Chonburi	(Thailand) Jukkapant Punpee	Resigned	31 May 2019	13	10	(Thailand) Sasom Pobprasert
Suphanburi	(Thailand) Totchtawan Sripan	Resigned	2 June 2019	13	16	(Nigeria) Adebayo Gbadebo
Muangthong United	(South Korea) Yoon Jong-hwan	Sacked	12 June 2019	13	15	(Brazil) Alexandre Gama
Chiangmai	(Brazil) Carlos Eduardo Parreira	Sacked	28 June 2019	15	15	(Thailand) Surapong Kongthep
Ratchaburi Mitr Phol	(Italy) Marco Simone	Signed by SCC Mohammédia	14 July 2019	18	11	(Thailand) Somchai Maiwilai
Port	(Thailand) Jadet Meelarp	Promoted to Technical director	21 July 2019	19	5	(Thailand) Choketawee Promrut
Sukhothai	(Serbia) Ljubomir Ristovski	Sacked	1 August 2019	21	12	(Thailand) Pairoj Borwonwatanadilok
Nakhon Ratchasima	(Serbia) Miloš Joksić	Resigned	26 August 2019	25	12	(Thailand) Chalermwoot Sa-ngapol

=== Foreign Players ===
Club	Player 1	Player 2	Player 3	Asian Player	ASEAN 1	ASEAN 2	ASEAN 3	Former
Bangkok United	(Brazil) Everton	(Brazil) Vander	(El Salvador) Nelson Bonilla	(Bahrain) Jaycee John	(Philippines) Michael Falkesgaard			(Japan) Mike Havenaar
Buriram United	(Netherlands) Nacer Barazite	(Sweden) Rasmus Jönsson	(Venezuela) Andrés Túñez	(Japan) Hajime Hosogai	(Philippines) Kevin Ingreso	(Philippines) Stephan Palla		(Brazil) Pedro Júnior (Mali) Modibo Maïga (Vietnam) Lương Xuân Trường (Philippines) Javier Patiño
Chainat Hornbill	(Brazil) Ricardo Santos	(Australia) Eli Babalj	(Japan) Kazuki Murakami	(Japan) Ryutaro Karube	(Philippines) Adam Reed	(Philippines) Marco Casambre	(Laos) Soukaphone Vongchiengkham	(Netherlands) Leandro Resida (Spain) Gorka Unda
Chiangmai	(Brazil) Eliandro	(Brazil) Evson Patrício	(Brazil) Caíque	(Afghanistan) Mustafa Azadzoy				(Brazil) David Bala
Chiangrai United	(Brazil) Bill	(Brazil) Brinner	(Brazil) William Henrique	(South Korea) Lee Yong-rae				
Chonburi	(Brazil) Caion	(Brazil) Júnior Lopes		(South Korea) Kim Gyeong-min	(Myanmar) Zaw Min Tun	(Philippines) Curt Dizon	(Philippines) Ángel Guirado	(Brazil) Patrick Cruz (South Korea) Park Hyun-beom (Myanmar) Sithu Aung (Brazil) Lukian
Muangthong United	(Brazil) Bruno Gallo	(Brazil) Derley	(Brazil) Heberty	(South Korea) Oh Ban-suk	(Myanmar) Aung Thu	(Vietnam) Đặng Văn Lâm	(Philippines) Daisuke Sato	(North Macedonia) Mario Gjurovski (South Korea) Lee Ho
Nakhon Ratchasima	(Brazil) Leandro Assumpção	(Ivory Coast) Amadou Ouattara	(Ivory Coast) Bernard Doumbia	(South Korea) Lee Won-jae	(Philippines) Mark Hartmann			
Port	(Brazil) Josimar	(Panama) Rolando Blackburn	(Spain) Sergio Suárez	(South Korea) Go Seul-ki	(Philippines) Martin Steuble			(Montenegro) Dragan Bošković (Spain) David Rochela
PT Prachuap	(Brazil) Maurinho	(France) Jean-Philippe Mendy	(Montenegro) Adnan Orahovac	(Uzbekistan) Artyom Filiposyan				(Brazil) Caion (Brazil) Matheus Alves
PTT Rayong	(Brazil) Dennis Murillo	(Brazil) Victor Cardozo	(Costa Rica) Ariel Rodríguez	(South Korea) Jung Hoon	(Indonesia) Victor Igbonefo			(England) Jay Emmanuel-Thomas
Ratchaburi	(Ivory Coast) Lossémy Karaboué	(Ivory Coast) Yannick Boli	(Martinique) Steeven Langil	(South Korea) Yoo Jun-soo	(Philippines) Amin Nazari	(Philippines) Manuel Ott	(Philippines) Javier Patiño	(Myanmar) Thein Than Win (South Korea) Kang Soo-il (Brazil) Dirceu
Samut Prakan City	(Brazil) Ibson Melo	(Slovenia) Aris Zarifović	(South Korea) Kim Ho-yeong	(South Korea) Kim Pyung-rae	(Myanmar) Kyaw Ko Ko			(Brazil) Carlão (South Korea) Kim Tae-yeon
Sukhothai	(Democratic Republic of the Congo) Joël Sami	(Madagascar) John Baggio	(El Salvador) Irvin Herrera	(South Korea) Jung Myung-oh	(Philippines) Iain Ramsay	(Philippines) Joshua Grommen	(Indonesia) Yanto Basna	(Montenegro) Petar Orlandić (Malaysia) Curran Ferns
Suphanburi	(Brazil) Cleiton Silva	(Brazil) Dellatorre	(Israel) Miki Siroshtein	(South Korea) Kim Sung-hwan	(Philippines) Álvaro Silva	(Philippines) Patrick Deyto		(Brazil) Anderson (Philippines) Mark Hartmann (Brazil) Jonatan Reis
Trat	(Ivory Coast) Bireme Diouf	(Guinea) Lonsana Doumbouya	(Nigeria) Adefolarin Durosinmi	(Japan) Yuki Bamba	(Singapore) Baihakki Khaizan			(Malaysia) Dominic Tan

== League table ==
Pos	Team	Pld	W	D	L	GF	GA	GD	Pts	Qualification or relegation
1	Chiangrai United (C, Q)	30	16	10	4	53	28	+25	58 (Note: Chiangrai United finished ahead of Buriram United on head-to-head points: Buriram United 0–0 Chiangrai United, Chiangrai United 4–0 Buriram United.)	Qualification for AFC Champions League group stage
2	Buriram United (Q)	30	16	10	4	51	25	+26	58	Qualification for AFC Champions League preliminary round 2 (Note: Port qualified for the AFC Champions League preliminary round 2 as 2019 Thai FA Cup winners.)
3	Port (Q)	30	15	8	7	55	36	+19	53	Qualification for AFC Champions League preliminary round 2
4	Bangkok United	30	13	11	6	55	32	+23	50	
5	Muangthong United	30	14	4	12	45	42	+3	46	
6	Samut Prakan City	30	12	7	11	44	50	−6	43	
7	Chonburi	30	11	7	12	43	45	−2	40	
8	Ratchaburi Mitr Phol	30	10	8	12	48	48	0	38	
9	Prachuap	30	9	10	11	32	44	−12	37	
10	Trat	30	9	8	13	47	47	0	35 (Note: Trat finished ahead of PTT Rayong on head-to-head points: PTT Rayong 2–3 Trat, Trat 0–0 PTT Rayong.)	
11	PTT Rayong	30	9	8	13	33	46	−13	35	Club resigned and folded
12	Sukhothai	30	6	16	8	37	37	0	34 (Note: Sukhothai finished ahead of Nakhon Ratchasima Mazda on head-to-head points: Sukhothai 1–0 Nakhon Ratchasima Mazda, Nakhon Ratchasima Mazda 2–4 Sukhothai.)	
13	Nakhon Ratchasima	30	9	7	14	45	51	−6	34	
14	Suphanburi	30	7	11	12	29	44	−15	32	
15	Chainat Hornbill (R)	30	8	6	16	31	50	−19	30	Relegation to Thai League 2
16	Chiangmai (R)	30	7	7	16	39	62	−23	28	Relegation to Thai League 2

Source: Thai League
Rules for classification: 1) Points; 2) Head-to-head points; 3) Head-to-head goals difference; 4) Head-to-head goals scored; 5) Overall goals difference; 6) Overall goals scored; 7) Fair play points; 8) Play-off without extra time;).
(C) Champions; (Q) Qualified for the phase indicated; (R) Relegated

== Positions by round ==
The table lists the positions of teams after each week of matches. In order to preserve chronological evolvements, any postponed matches are not included in the round at which they were originally scheduled, but added to the full round they were played immediately afterwards. For example, if a match is scheduled for matchday 13, but then postponed and played between days 16 and 17, it will be added to the standings for day 16.

Team ╲ Round	1	2	3	4	5	6	7	8	9	10	11	12	13	14	15	16	17	18	19	20	21	22	23	24	25	26	27	28	29	30
Buriram United	5	8	6	2	1	1	2	2	2	2	3	2	2	1	1	1	1	1	1	1	2	1	1	1	1	2	1	1	1	2
Bangkok United	7	3	2	6	4	7	5	6	5	6	7	4	3	3	2	2	4	3	3	4	5	4	4	4	4	4	4	4	4	4
Port	12	5	1	3	5	3	1	1	1	1	1	1	1	2	3	5	5	5	5	5	3	3	3	3	3	3	3	2	3	3
Muangthong United	15	15	9	8	10	15	15	16	16	16	16	16	15	16	14	13	12	12	9	7	6	6	6	6	6	5	5	5	5	5
Chiangrai United	11	4	7	9	13	12	3	3	3	3	2	3	5	6	5	4	3	2	4	2	1	2	2	2	2	1	2	3	2	1
PT Prachuap	4	2	5	1	2	2	4	4	7	5	6	8	8	9	8	9	10	10	12	13	14	14	13	12	11	9	9	9	9	9
Nakhon Ratchasima	3	7	4	5	3	6	7	7	6	7	5	6	7	7	7	7	7	8	10	11	10	11	11	11	12	12	12	12	12	13
Samut Prakan City	2	1	3	4	9	4	6	5	4	4	4	5	4	4	4	3	2	4	2	3	4	5	5	5	5	6	6	6	6	6
Chonburi	6	12	15	16	15	10	10	8	8	8	10	9	10	8	10	8	9	9	11	9	7	7	7	7	8	11	7	7	7	7
Suphanburi	10	11	11	7	11	14	16	12	14	14	13	13	16	15	16	15	16	16	15	15	15	15	15	15	14	15	13	13	13	14
Sukhothai	8	10	10	10	6	5	8	9	10	10	11	10	11	12	9	11	13	13	13	14	12	12	12	13	13	13	14	14	14	12
Ratchaburi Mitr Phol	1	6	12	13	9	13	14	11	12	11	9	11	9	10	11	10	11	11	8	10	9	9	8	10	9	7	8	8	8	8
Chainat Hornbill	9	9	8	14	16	11	12	10	11	12	12	15	12	13	12	14	14	14	14	12	13	13	14	14	15	14	15	15	15	15
PTT Rayong	16	16	13	12	8	8	9	13	13	13	14	14	13	11	13	12	8	6	6	6	8	10	10	9	10	8	11	11	11	11
Trat	14	14	14	15	12	16	13	14	9	9	8	7	6	5	6	6	6	7	7	8	11	8	9	8	7	10	10	10	10	10
Chiangmai	13	13	16	11	14	9	11	15	15	15	15	12	14	14	15	16	15	15	16	16	16	16	16	16	16	16	16	16	16	16

Leader and qualification to the 2020 AFC Champions League Group stage
Qualification to the 2020 AFC Champions League Preliminary round 2
Relegation to the 2020 Thai League 2

Source: Thai League

== Results by match played ==
Team ╲ Round	1	2	3	4	5	6	7	8	9	10	11	12	13	14	15	16	17	18	19	20	21	22	23	24	25	26	27	28	29	30
Buriram United	D	D	W	W	W	D	D	W	W	W	L	D	W	W	W	L	D	D	D	W	L	W	W	W	D	L	W	W	W	D
Bangkok United	D	W	W	L	D	L	W	L	W	D	D	W	W	W	W	D	L	W	D	D	L	D	W	L	W	D	D	W	D	W
Port	D	W	W	D	L	W	W	W	W	W	D	D	W	L	L	L	D	D	L	W	W	D	W	W	L	W	W	W	L	D
Muangthong United	L	L	W	W	L	L	L	L	D	L	D	L	W	L	W	W	W	D	W	W	W	W	L	D	W	W	W	L	L	W
Chiangrai United	D	W	D	L	D	W	W	D	W	W	W	L	L	D	W	W	D	W	L	W	W	D	W	D	W	W	D	D	W	W
PT Prachuap	W	W	L	W	L	W	L	D	L	W	D	L	L	D	W	L	L	D	D	L	L	D	D	W	W	W	D	D	L	D
Nakhon Ratchasima	W	L	W	D	D	L	W	L	W	L	W	D	L	W	L	L	D	D	L	D	W	L	D	L	L	W	L	L	W	L
Samut Prakan City	W	W	L	D	L	W	D	D	W	W	D	L	W	W	W	D	W	L	W	L	L	L	L	W	L	D	L	W	L	D
Chonburi	D	L	L	L	W	W	D	W	L	D	L	W	L	W	L	W	L	D	D	W	W	D	L	W	L	L	W	D	W	L
Suphanburi	D	D	D	W	L	L	L	W	L	L	D	D	L	L	L	W	D	D	D	W	D	D	L	L	W	L	W	D	W	L
Sukhothai	D	D	D	D	W	D	D	D	L	D	W	L	D	L	W	D	L	D	L	L	W	D	D	D	D	L	L	D	W	W
Ratchaburi Mitr Phol	W	L	L	L	W	L	L	W	L	D	W	L	W	L	L	W	D	D	W	L	W	D	D	L	W	W	L	D	D	D
Chainat Hornbill	D	D	D	L	L	W	W	L	D	L	L	L	W	L	W	L	W	L	D	W	L	D	L	L	L	W	L	L	L	W
PTT Rayong	L	L	W	D	W	D	L	D	L	L	D	W	L	W	L	W	W	W	W	L	L	L	D	D	D	W	L	D	L	L
Trat	L	D	L	D	W	L	D	D	W	D	W	W	W	W	L	L	L	L	W	L	L	W	L	W	D	L	D	D	L	L
Chiangmai	L	D	L	W	W	L	L	L	D	D	L	W	L	L	L	D	W	D	L	L	D	W	L	W	L	L	L	L	W	D

Source: Thai League
W = Win; D = Draw; L = Lose

== Results ==
Home \ Away	BKU	BRU	CHB	CHM	CRU	CBR	MTU	NRM	POR	PTP	PTT	RBM	SPC	SUK	SPB	TRA
Bangkok United	—	0–1	2–0	2–0	1–1	2–4	1–0	2–2	2–0	6–1	4–0	2–0	2–1	2–2	4–0	2–1
Buriram United	1–1	—	1–0	4–0	0–0	2–2	1–0	2–0	3–1	2–0	5–0	6–0	3–2	1–1	0–0	1–1
Chainat Hornbill	2–1	2–1	—	2–2	1–1	1–0	3–0	1–3	0–3	1–1	1–2	0–3	2–3	1–0	0–0	3–2
Chiangmai	1–1	1–1	2–2	—	0–1	2–1	1–1	5–1	0–2	1–0	0–2	2–1	2–2	0–0	0–1	1–3
Chiangrai United	1–3	4–0	1–0	2–1	—	1–0	2–3	1–1	0–0	4–1	1–0	1–1	1–1	1–1	3–1	3–1
Chonburi	2–1	1–0	1–2	7–5	0–2	—	2–0	2–1	2–3	3–2	3–0	1–0	0–2	2–2	0–0	3–3
Muangthong United	3–2	3–1	3–0	2–0	1–0	0–2	—	2–0	1–2	0–1	2–2	2–1	0–3	2–0	4–1	3–0
Nakhon Ratchasima	1–1	2–3	2–1	4–2	1–2	4–0	3–1	—	1–1	3–1	0–1	3–3	4–1	2–4	1–1	0–0
Port	1–1	1–3	4–0	3–1	1–4	2–2	2–0	3–0	—	5–0	1–1	1–0	2–2	1–0	3–2	4–1
PT Prachuap	1–0	0–0	3–1	2–0	0–0	0–2	1–2	1–0	1–1	—	2–0	2–2	2–0	1–1	2–1	2–3
PTT Rayong	1–4	0–1	1–2	2–3	2–2	1–0	2–2	0–1	1–0	3–1	—	1–3	2–1	0–0	2–0	2–3
Ratchaburi Mitr Phol	2–2	1–2	2–1	4–1	0–2	2–0	2–0	2–3	1–1	0–1	1–1	—	5–2	2–2	3–0	3–2
Samut Prakan City	1–1	1–4	1–0	3–2	0–3	1–0	2–1	2–0	2–1	1–1	0–3	2–1	—	0–0	2–3	2–3
Sukhothai	1–1	1–1	2–0	1–2	2–3	0–0	2–3	1–0	3–1	1–1	3–1	2–2	1–2	—	1–1	2–1
Suphanburi	1–1	0–0	1–0	1–2	2–5	3–0	0–0	3–1	1–3	1–1	0–0	3–0	0–1	1–1	—	1–0
Trat	0–1	0–1	2–2	4–0	3–1	1–1	3–4	2–1	1–2	0–0	0–0	0–1	1–1	2–0	4–0	—

Updated to match(es) played on 26 October 2019. Source: Thai League
Legend: Blue = home team win; Yellow = draw; Red = away team win.

== Season statistics ==
=== Top scorers ===
As of 26 October 2019.

Rank	Player	Club	Goals
1	(Guinea) Lonsana Doumbouya	Trat	20
2	(El Salvador) Nelson Bonilla	Bangkok United	16
3	(Brazil) Leandro Assumpção	Nakhon Ratchasima	15
3	(Brazil) Ibson Melo	Samut Prakan City	15
5	(Brazil) Bill	Chiangrai United	14
5	(Brazil) Heberty	Muangthong United	14
5	(Ivory Coast) Yannick Boli	Ratchaburi Mitr Phol	14
8	(Brazil) Caion	PT Prachuap (6 Goals); Chonburi (7 Goals)	13
9	(Brazil) Eliandro	Chiangmai	12
9	(Ivory Coast) Bernard Doumbia	Nakhon Ratchasima	12

=== Top assists ===
As of 26 October 2019.

Rank	Player	Club	Assists
1	(Brazil) Heberty	Muangthong United	17
2	(Thailand) Jakkapan Pornsai	Ratchaburi Mitr Phol	10
3	(Brazil) Vander	Bangkok United	8
4	(Thailand) Sanrawat Dechmitr	Bangkok United	7
4	(Thailand) Kroekrit Thaweekarn	Chonburi	7
4	(Ivory Coast) Amadou Ouattara	Nakhon Ratchasima	7
4	(Spain) Sergio Suárez	Port	7
4	(Martinique) Steeven Langil	Ratchaburi Mitr Phol	7
9	(Thailand) Ekanit Panya	Chiangrai United	6
9	(Thailand) Saharat Kanyaroj	PTT Rayong	6
9	(Thailand) Philip Roller	Ratchaburi Mitr Phol	6
9	(Thailand) Teeraphol Yoryoei	Samut Prakan City	6
9	(Philippines) Ian Ramsay	Sukhothai	6

=== Hat-tricks ===
Player	For	Against	Result	Date
(Ivory Coast) Yannick Boli	Ratchaburi Mitr Phol	Trat	3–2	22 February 2019
(Brazil) Lukian^{5}	Chonburi	Chiangmai	7–5	21 April 2019
(Brazil) Leandro Assumpção	Nakhon Ratchasima	Chonburi	4–0	28 April 2019
(El Salvador) Nelson Bonilla	Bangkok United	PT Prachuap	6–1	28 April 2019
(Ivory Coast) Bireme Diouf	Trat	Chonburi	3–3	11 May 2019

=== Clean sheets ===
As of 26 October 2019.

Rank	Player	Club	Clean sheets
1	Siwarak Tedsungnoen	Buriram United	14
2	Sinthaweechai Hathairattanakool	Suphanburi/Chonburi	11
3	Apirak Woravong	Chiangrai United	10
4	Peerapong Ruenin	PTT Rayong	9
5	Michael Falkesgaard	Bangkok United	7
5	Đặng Văn Lâm	Muangthong United	7
7	Worawut Srisupha	Port	6
7	Kwanchai Suklom	PT Prachuap	6
7	Kittikun Jamsuwan	Sukhothai	6
10	Ukrit Wongmeema	Ratchaburi Mitr Phol	4
10	Patiwat Khammai	Samut Prakan City	4
10	Patrick Deyto	Suphanburi	4
10	Todsaporn Sri-reung	Trat	4

== Awards ==
=== Monthly awards ===
Month	Coach of the Month		Player of the Month		Reference
Month	Coach	Club	Player	Club	Reference
March	Ljubomir Ristovski	Sukhothai	Chalermpong Kerdkaew	Nakhon Ratchasima	
April	Jadet Meelarp	Port	Bordin Phala	Port	
May	Phayong Khunnaen	Trat	Lonsana Doumbouya	Trat	
June	Alexandré Pölking	Bangkok United	Patiwat Khammai	Samut Prakan City	
July	Alexandre Gama	Muangthong United	Heberty	Muangthong United	
August	Ailton Silva	Chiangrai United	Brinner	Chiangrai United	
September	Choketawee Promrut	Port	Adnan Orahovac	PT Prachuap	
October	Surapong Kongthep	Chiangmai	Phitiwat Sukjitthammakul	Chiangrai United	

== Attendances ==
=== Overall statistical table ===
Pos	Team	Total	High	Low	Average	Change
1	Buriram United	203,374	32,538	7,597	13,558	+4.3%
2	Nakhon Ratchasima	185,813	22,555	3,615	12,388	+69.2%
3	Muangthong United	136,501	12,942	5,452	9,100	+15.0%
4	Suphanburi	97,965	13,655	2,339	6,531	+22.6%
5	Port	76,312	7,960	2,478	5,087	+27.6%
6	Chiangrai United	75,778	10,814	2,765	5,052	+44.1%
7	Ratchaburi Mitr Phol	73,134	8,415	3,397	4,876	+36.7%
8	Chonburi	71,345	8,450	1,845	4,756	+10.5%
9	Bangkok United	65,673	15,155	1,278	4,378	+50.5%
10	Chainat Hornbill	60,194	6,092	2,309	4,013	+31.1%
11	Trat	59,039	4,955	2,541	3,936	+184.2%^{†}
12	PTT Rayong	57,159	10,822	2,108	3,811	+99.4%^{†}
13	Sukhothai	56,464	7,995	2,266	3,764	−18.3%
14	PT Prachuap	53,747	4,655	2,490	3,583	−6.7%
15	Chiangmai	52,323	12,796	443	3,488	+117.2%^{†}
16	Samut Prakan City	42,950	4,932	1,429	2,863	+7.9%
	League total	1,367,681	32,538	443	5,699	+27.6%

Updated to games played on 26 October 2019
Source: Thai League
Notes:
^{†} Teams played previous season in Thai League 2

=== Attendances by home match played ===
Team \ Match played	1	2	3	4	5	6	7	8	9	10	11	12	13	14	15	Total
Bangkok United	12,826	15,155	2,692	3,066	2,989	2,431	2,068	2,484	2,548	2,362	2,312	8,376	2,892	1,278	2,194	65,673
Buriram United	15,491	10,625	10,634	9,920	10,977	15,879	27,009	7,597	8,908	10,000	13,242	10,755	10,799	9,000	32,538	203,374
Chainat Hornbill	3,895	4,247	3,576	6,092	5,254	5,072	3,121	3,824	4,249	3,272	3,587	3,817	3,520	2,309	4,089	60,194
Chiangmai	6,890	3,511	3,439	2,030	2,952	2,852	2,492	2,050	9,950	1,011	443	451	755	701	12,796	52,323
Chiangrai United	3,960	7,421	2,911	3,985	3,990	3,707	3,097	6,144	2,861	3,386	10,814	3,143	2,765	7,584	10,010	75,778
Chonburi	4,622	4,270	3,251	3,390	3,605	3,545	6,242	8,450	4,397	4,829	5,629	5,507	7,105	4,658	1,845	71,345
Muangthong United	9,797	7,427	9,531	7,506	5,452	7,792	12,418	10,876	9,241	6,261	9,639	8,592	7,552	12,942	11,475	136,501
Nakhon Ratchasima	17,215	14,120	10,807	18,614	12,677	10,365	22,555	5,824	10,371	8,976	3,615	4,780	4,277	22,463	19,154	185,813
Port	7,096	4,975	2,478	4,407	4,602	7,960	3,416	7,600	5,606	5,955	5,300	6,452	3,140	4,015	3,490	76,312
PT Prachuap	4,105	3,820	3,210	3,060	3,090	2,490	3,349	4,655	4,357	3,480	3,865	3,819	3,515	2,942	3,990	53,747
PTT Rayong	4,637	2,168	2,534	2,108	5,233	2,723	2,509	3,947	2,274	4,867	3,625	10,822	3,191	4,123	2,398	57,159
Ratchaburi Mitr Phol	5,088	6,315	8,238	4,975	8,415	3,540	3,397	4,423	4,542	4,117	3,789	3,667	3,934	4,397	4,297	73,134
Samut Prakan City	4,932	2,856	1,429	2,061	2,050	1,530	4,572	4,434	1,869	4,926	1,917	2,980	1,495	3,559	2,340	42,950
Sukhothai	6,052	4,055	3,310	3,260	2,853	2,584	4,781	3,182	3,239	2,266	2,341	3,924	7,995	3,140	3,482	56,464
Suphanburi	13,019	7,517	5,321	3,793	9,121	2,463	2,339	3,021	5,951	6,980	7,942	8,626	2,499	5,718	13,655	97,965
Trat	4,195	4,955	2,995	2,900	3,955	4,135	4,255	3,905	3,959	3,992	4,955	4,342	2,541	3,565	4,390	59,039

Source: Thai League

== See also ==
- 2019 Thai League 2
- 2019 Thai League 3
- 2019 Thai League 4
- 2019 Thailand Amateur League
- 2019 Thai FA Cup
- 2019 Thai League Cup
- 2019 Thailand Champions Cup
- List of foreign Thai League 1 players
