= Watcharakorn Klaitin =

Thai footballer

Personal information
- Full name: Watcharakorn Klaitin
- Date of birth: 28 March 1986 (age 40)
- Place of birth: Chiang Rai, Thailand
- Height: 1.72 m (5 ft 7 1/2 in)
- Positions: Striker; attacking midfielder

Youth career
- 2002–2003: Rajdamnern Commercial College

Senior career*
Years	Team	Apps	(Gls)
2003–2006	BEC Tero Sasana	20	(2)
2007–2008	Lopburi	28	(9)
2009–2010	Chiangrai United	17	(19)
2011–2012	Muangthong United	0	(0)
2011	→ F.C. Phuket (loan)	0	(0)
2012	Phayao	10	(2)
2013	Chiangrai City	6	(1)
Total		81	(33)
- * Club domestic league appearances and goals as of 22 June 2008

Watcharakorn Klaitin (Thai: วัชรากร ไกลถิ่น) is a Thai retired footballer. He was a forward.
