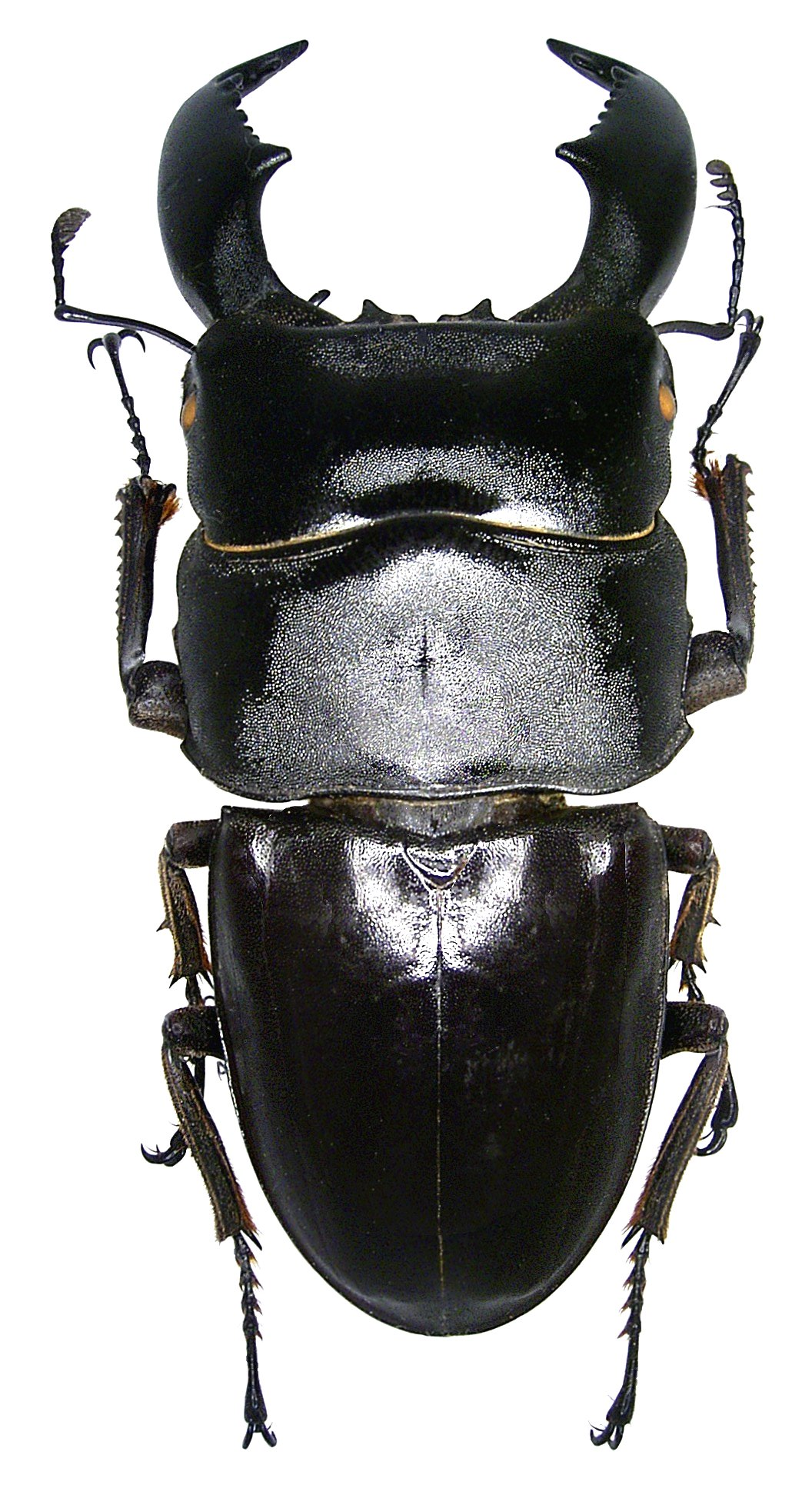
- From Sumatra, Indonesia

Scientific classification
- Kingdom: Animalia
- Phylum: Arthropoda
- Class: Insecta
- Order: Coleoptera
- Suborder: Polyphaga
- Infraorder: Scarabaeiformia
- Family: Lucanidae
- Genus: Serrognathus
- Species: S. titanus

Binomial name
- Serrognathus titanus (Boisduval, 1835)

Synonyms
- Dorcus titanus (Boisduval, 1835); Lucanus titanus Boisduval, 1835; Lucanus titanus briareus Hope & Westwood, 1845

= Serrognathus titanus =

Giant stag beetle of the family Lucanidae

Serrognathus titanus is a species of beetle in the family Lucanidae. It was described by Jean Baptiste Boisduval in 1835. Huang and Chen (2013) separated Serognathus from the genus Dorcus by representing morphological characters and DNA analysis.

== Description ==
Males measure 32.0–111.3 millimetres (1.26–4.38 in) including mandibles; females 36.5–54 millimetres (1.44–2.13 in). It has an elongated, somewhat flat body dull black with blackish antennae and legs. Male's antler-like jaws have small teeth along inner edge and a pair of big teeth toward the bottom, and are forked at end. The head of a large male reaches nearly the length of its prothorax and abdomen combined.

== Life cycle ==
Adults can be seen from May to August. They feed on tree juice, especially of Quercus species. Females lay eggs on the underground part of fallen oaks. The eggs hatch in about a month and the larvae feed on rotten wood. The larval period lasts about one year. The complete life cycle can last approximately from 1 to 2 years.

== Distribution ==
This species is widely distributed in Indonesia, the Philippines, Malaysia, Thailand, Vietnam, Laos, Myanmar, India, Japan, China, Taiwan and Korea.

== Habitat ==
It mainly inhabits tropical rainforests and temperate forests from lowland to mountains.

== Human uses ==
This beetle has some commercial value and export from some regions is criminalized. There are some Asian cultures that assign aphrodisiac properties to this insect. However, most are imported for sport, decorative show, or to be kept as an exotic pet. This stag beetle is also popular pet in Asia and Europe.

== Gallery ==
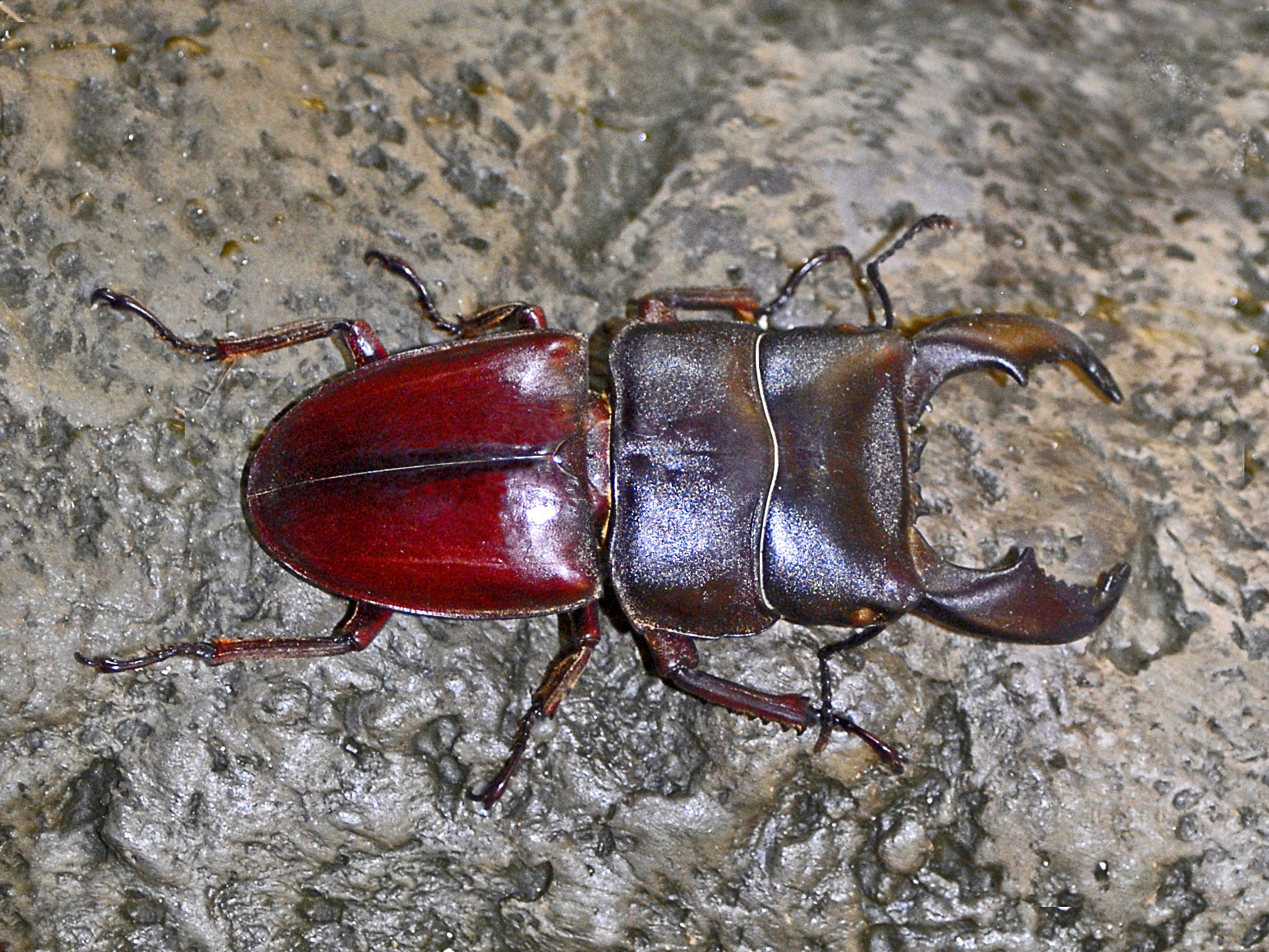
Male

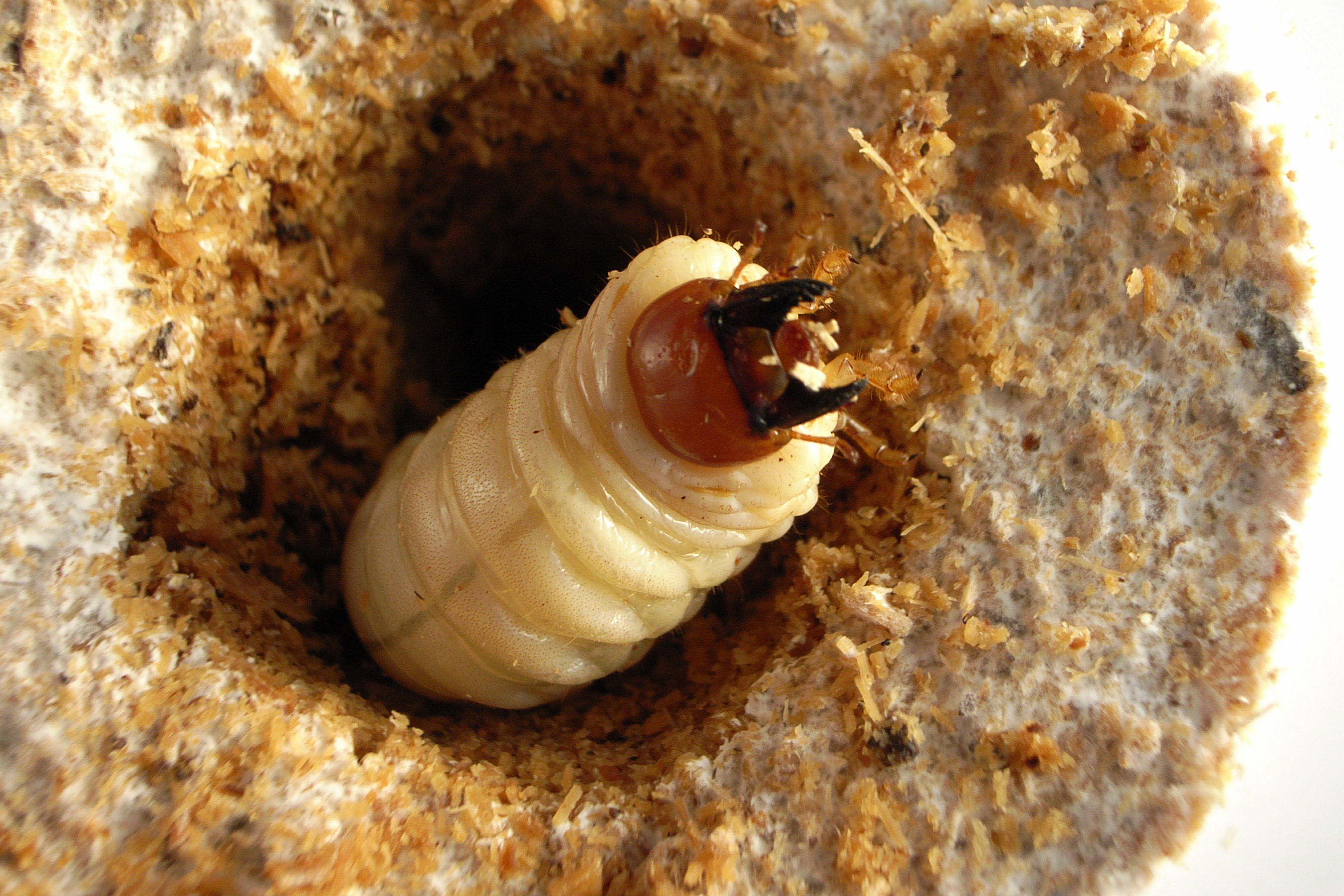
Larva

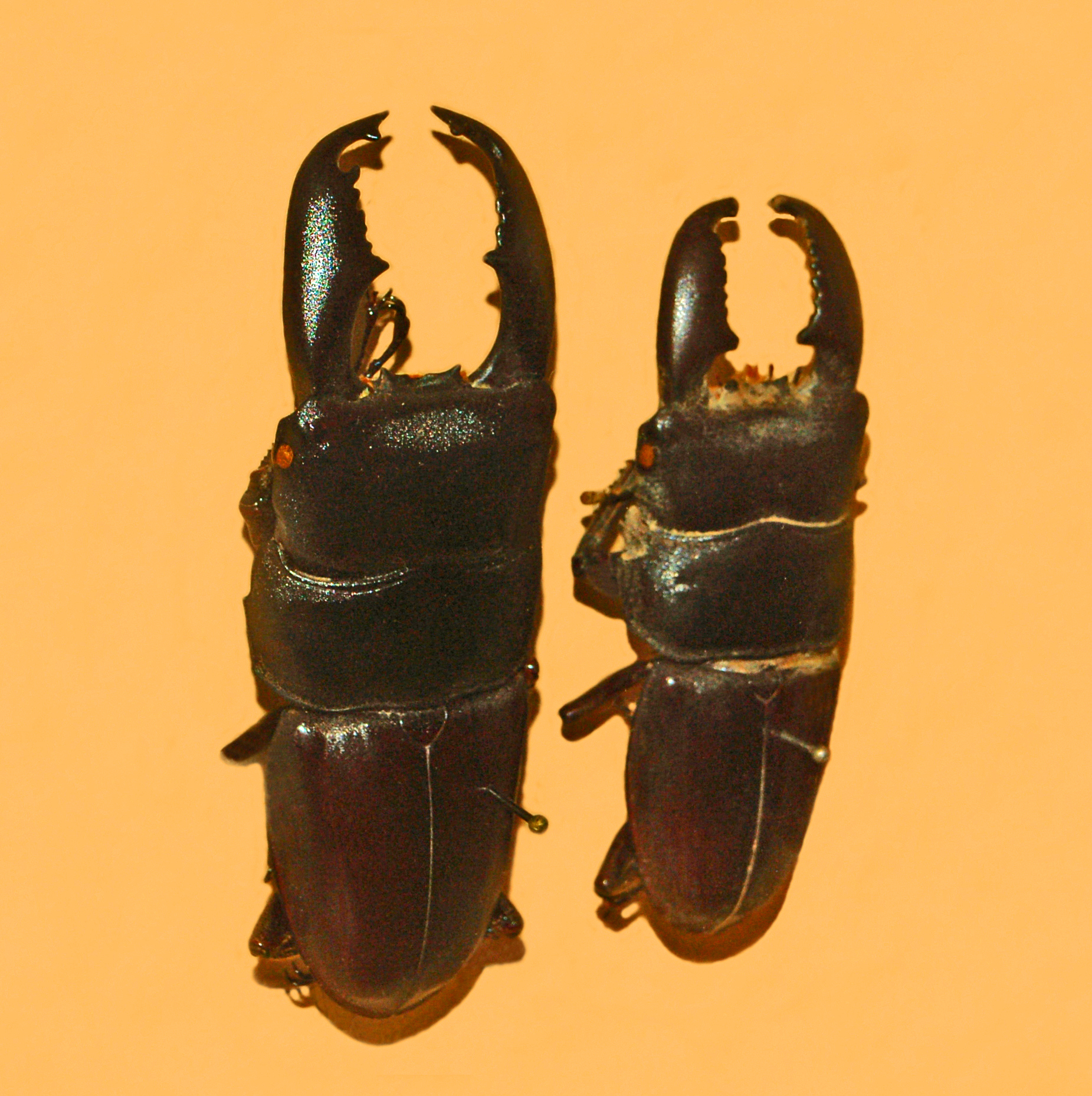
Museum specimen

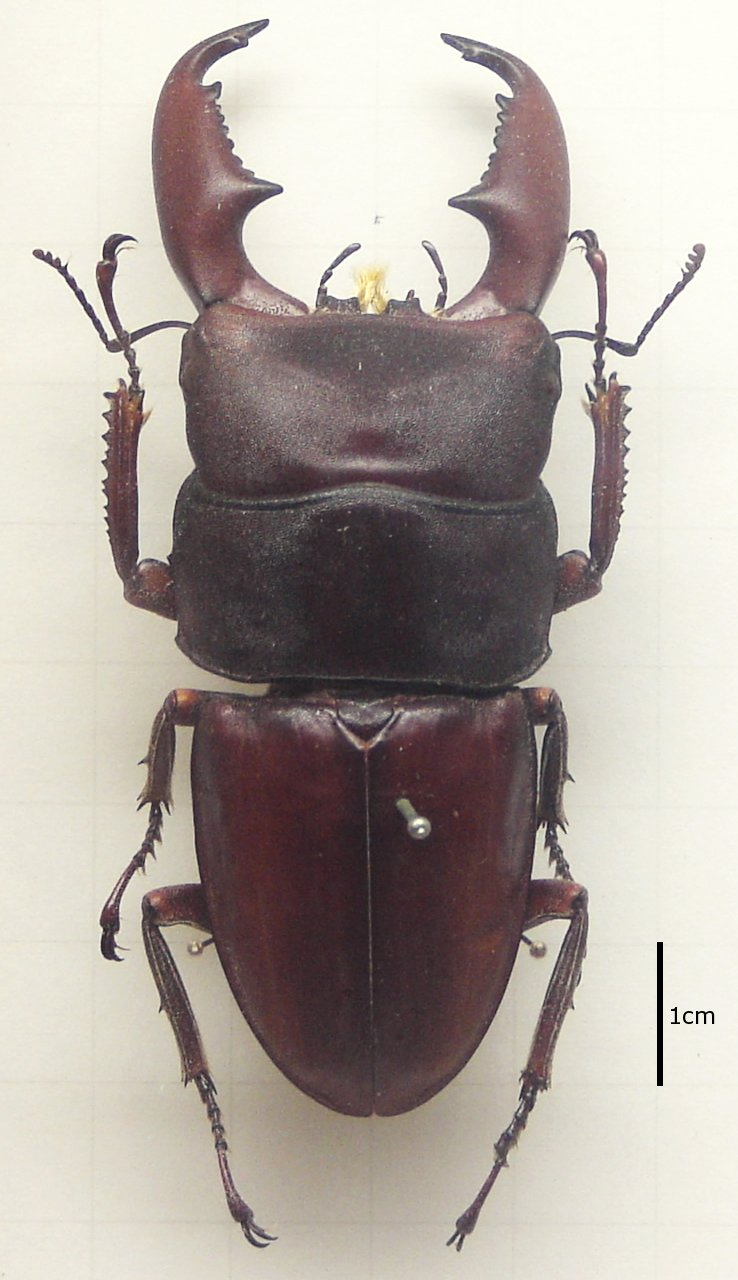
Mounted specimen from Sulawesi (Celebes)

== Subspecies ==
Hiroshi Fujita, a Japanese collector from the Mushi-sha insect shop, described over 20 new subspecies of S. titanus in his book "The Lucanid Beetles of the World". His subspecies included 11 subspecies in Japan alone. He also further divided S. titanus titanus specimens found in the Malay Archipelago into S. titanus yasuokai, S. titanus typhon, S. titanus nobuyukii and others.

Currently 24 named subspecies are extant with a further 15 undescribed subspecies identified by DNA analysis:

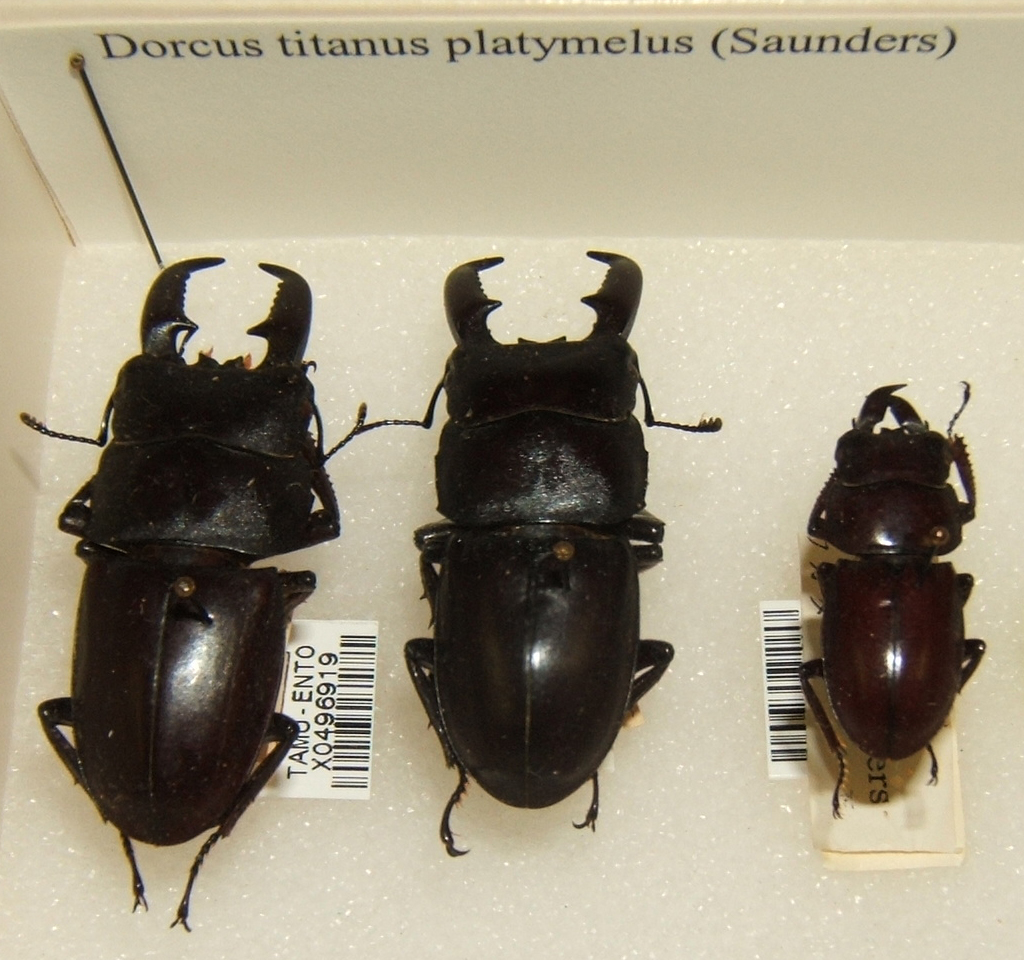
S. titanus platymelus

- Dorcus titanus castanicolor Motschulsky, 1861 - Japan (Tsushima), Korea (Korean Peninsula and Jeju-do), Mainland China
- Dorcus titanus daitoensis Fujita & Ichikawa, 1986 - Japan (Daitō Islands)
- Dorcus titanus elegans (Boileau, 1899) - Japan
- Dorcus titanus fafner - (Kriesche, 1920) Vietnam
- Dorcus titanus hachijoensis Fujita & Okuda, 1989 - Japan
- Dorcus titanus imperialis (Fujita, 2010) - Philippines
- Dorcus titanus karasuyamai (Baba, 1999) - Japan
- Dorcus titanus mindanaoensis (Fujita, 2010) - Mindanao
- Dorcus titanus nobuyukii (Fujita, 2010) - Malaysia
- Dorcus titanus okinawanus (Kriesche, 1922) - Okinawa
- Dorcus titanus okinoerabuensis Fujita & Ichikawa, 1985 - Japan
- Dorcus titanus palawanicus Lacroix, 1984 - Philippines (Palawan Island)
- Dorcus titanus pilifer (Snellen van Vollenhoven, 1860) - Japan
- Dorcus titanus platymelus (Saunders, 1854) - Mainland China
- Dorcus titanus sakishimanus (Nomura, 1964) - Japan (Sakishima Islands)
- Dorcus titanus sika (Kriesche, 1920) - Taiwan
- Dorcus titanus takaraensis Fujita & Ichikawa, 1985 - Japan (Takara Islands)
- Dorcus titanus tatsutai (Shiokawa, 2001) - Japan
- Dorcus titanus titanus (Boisduval, 1835) - Indonesia
- Dorcus titanus tokunoshimaensis Fujita & Ichikawa, 1985 - Japan
- Dorcus titanus typhon (Boileau, 1905) - Philippines
- Dorcus titanus typhoniformis (Nagel, 1924) - China (Yunnan)
- Dorcus titanus westermanni (Hope, 1842) - India, Bhutan, Bangladesh
- Dorcus titanus yasuokai (Fujita, 2010) - Indonesia (Sumatra)
- BOLD:ACG9587 (cf. Serrognathus titanus)
- BOLD:ACG9588 (cf. Serrognathus titanus)
- BOLD:ACG9589 (cf. Serrognathus titanus)
- BOLD:ACG9590 (cf. Serrognathus titanus)
- BOLD:ACG9701 (cf. Serrognathus titanus)
- BOLD:ACG9702 (cf. Serrognathus titanus)
- BOLD:ACG9703 (cf. Serrognathus titanus)
- BOLD:ACG9799 (cf. Serrognathus titanus)
- BOLD:ACG9972 (cf. Serrognathus titanus)
- BOLD:ACG9973 (cf. Serrognathus titanus)
- BOLD:ACG9974 (cf. Serrognathus titanus)
- BOLD:ACG9990 (cf. Serrognathus titanus)
- BOLD:ACG9991 (cf. Serrognathus titanus)
- BOLD:AEA4279 (cf. Serrognathus titanus)
- BOLD:AEA4916 (cf. Serrognathus titanus)
- BOLD:AEA7644 (cf. Serrognathus titanus)
