= José Gómez =

Jose Gómez may refer to:

== Arts and academia ==
- José Gómez Abad (1904–1993), Spanish painter
- José Luis Gómez Martínez (born 1943), Spanish university professor of Spanish language
- José Gómez-Sicre (1916–1991), Cuban author and lawyer
- José Luis Gómez (actor) (born 1940), Spanish film actor and director

== Politics and diplomacy ==
- José Miguel Gómez (1858–1921), Cuban general and president
- José Gómez (activist) (1943–2014), American labor and civil rights activist
- José Gómez de Arteche (1821–1906), Spanish military officer, historian and politician
- José Gómez Gordoa (1913–2005), Mexican lawyer, professor and diplomat
- José Gómez-Mena (1883–1960), Cuban sugar baron and minister of agriculture
- José Antonio Gómez Urrutia (born 1953), Chilean lawyer and politician
- José Carlos Gómez Villamandos (1963–2026), Spanish politician

== Sports ==
=== Association football ===
- José Gregorio Gómez (born 1963), Venezuelan footballer
- Jose Gomez (American soccer) (born 1979), American soccer player
- Joselu (footballer, born August 1990) (José Luis Gómez Hurtado), Spanish footballer
- José Luis Gómez (footballer) (born 1993), Argentine footballer

=== Combat sports ===
- Pepper Gomez, (José Serapio Palimino Gomez, 1927–2004), American professional wrestler
- José Gómez Mustelier (born 1959), Cuban boxer

=== Cycling ===
- José Gómez del Moral (1931–2021), Spanish cyclist
- José Gómez (cyclist) (1944–2014), Spanish Olympic cyclist
- José Ángel Gómez Marchante (born 1980), Spanish road bicycle racer
- José Luis Viejo Gómez (1949–2014), Spanish road cyclist

=== Other sports ===
- José Gómez Ortega (1895–1920), Spanish bullfighter
- José Gómez (sport shooter) (1916–2005), Guatemalan Olympic shooter
- José Gómez (runner) (1956–2021), Mexican distance runner

== Others ==
- José Horacio Gómez (born 1951), American Roman Catholic Archbishop
- Jose Gomez-Marquez (born 1976), Honduran inventor and educator
- José Dorángel Vargas Gómez (born 1957), Venezuelan serial killer and cannibal

== See also ==
- José Gomes (disambiguation)
