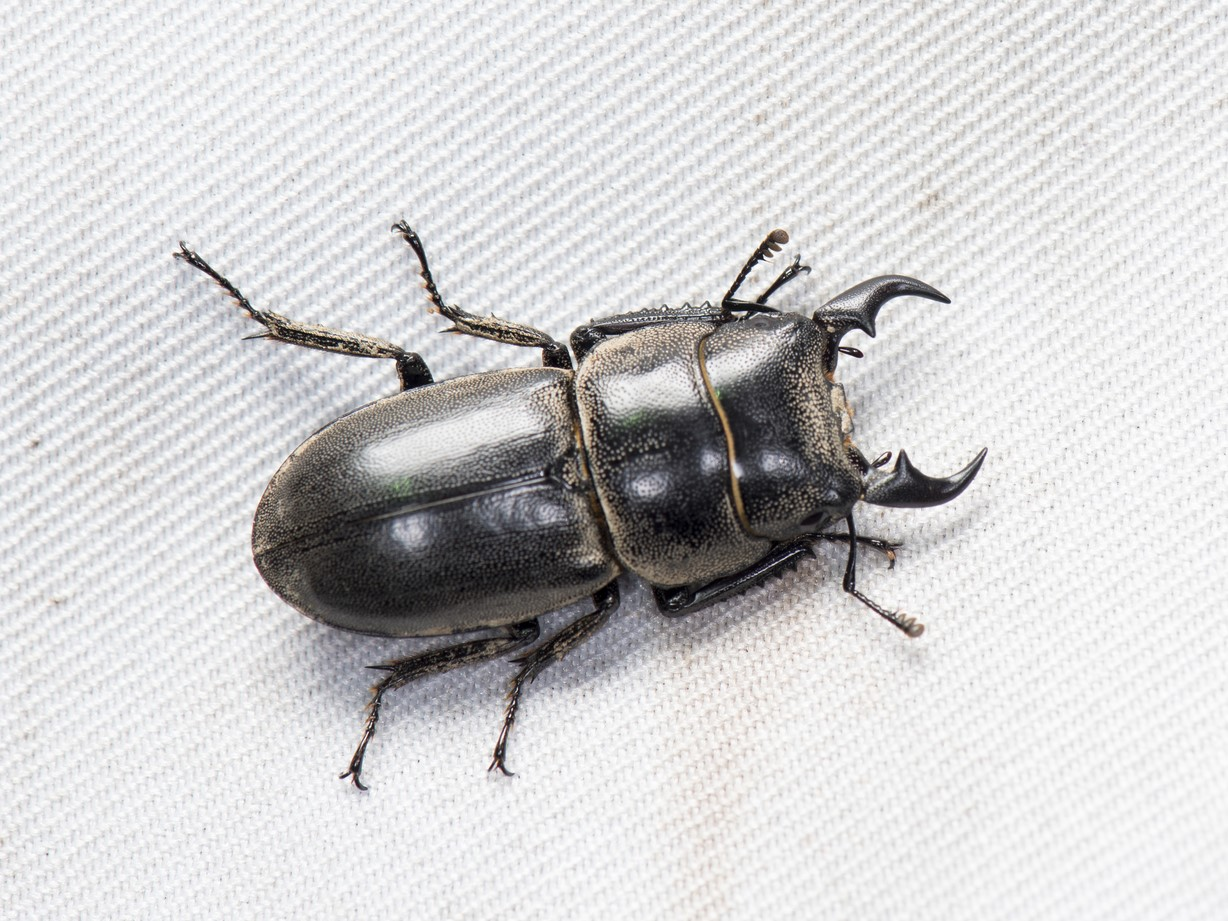
- Serrognathus kyanrauensis

Scientific classification
- Kingdom: Animalia
- Phylum: Arthropoda
- Clade: Pancrustacea
- Class: Insecta
- Order: Coleoptera
- Suborder: Polyphaga
- Infraorder: Scarabaeiformia
- Family: Lucanidae
- Subfamily: Lucaninae
- Genus: Serrognathus; Motschulsky, 1861

Synonyms
- Brontodorcus Parry, 1864; Brontodorcus Didier, 1931; Dorcus Burmeister, 1847

= Serrognathus =

Genus of beetles

Serrognathus is a genus of beetles in the stag beetle family Lucanidae. Species of the genus are found in the Indo-Australian region.

== Taxonomy ==
In 2011, the genus Serrognathus was reclassified and merged into the genus Dorcus. Previously, specimens with serriform teeth on the mandibles and sable pigment were separated from specimens with a singular or multiple bulky notches on the mandibles and lustrous sable pigmentation which were placed in the genus Dorcus. Latterly, the genus has been resurrected and is once again accepted as valid.

=== Species ===
The following species are recognised in the genus Serrognathus:

- Serrognathus alcides (Snellen van Vollenhoven, 1865)
- Serrognathus bucephalus (Perty, 1831)
- Serrognathus cofaisi Lacroix, 1984
- Serrognathus consentaneus (Albers, 1886)
- Serrognathus costatus (Boileau, 1898)
- Serrognathus damoiseaui (Maes, 1982)
- Serrognathus eurycephalus (Burmeister, 1847)
- Serrognathus kyanrauensis (Miwa, 1934)
- Serrognathus miwai (Benesh, 1936)
- Serrognathus platymelus (Saunders, 1854)
- Serrognathus reichei (Hope, 1842)
- Serrognathus taurus (Fabricius, 1801)
- Serrognathus thoracicus (Möllenkamp, 1902)
- Serrognathus titanus (Boisduval, 1835)

== Distribution and habitat ==
Species in this genus are found in China, Malaysia, Vietnam, Philippines, Korea, India, Laos, and Australia.

== Threats ==
In view of their impressive jaws, specimens are often mounted for display alongside butterflies and tarantulas. Unfortunately, as wild specimens are collected for mounting it should be expected that there will be a corresponding decline in wild populations.
