= Insect fighting =

Activity in which insects are made to fight each other

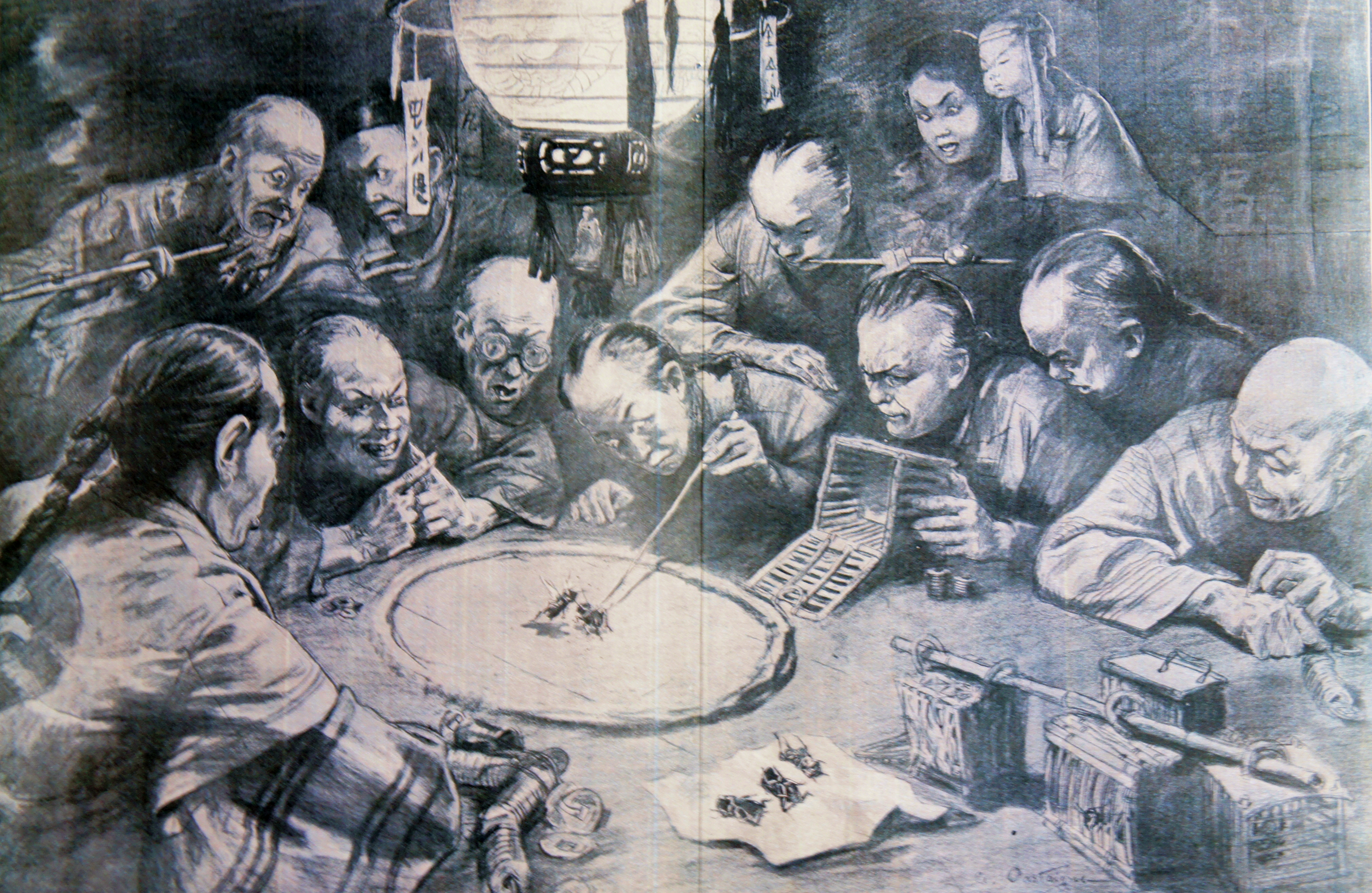
1903 illustration of Chinese insect fighting, by French artist André Castaigne

Insect fighting is a range of competitive sporting activity, commonly associated with gambling, in which insects are pitted against each other.

== Background ==
Forms of insect fighting as spectator sport are practiced in regions of China, Japan, Vietnam, and Thailand. Some types have a long history; for example, cricket-fighting is a traditional Chinese pastime that dates back to the Tang dynasty (618–907). Originally an indulgence of emperors, cricket fighting later became popular among commoners. Beetle-fighting, with such beetles as the Japanese rhinoceros beetle, Xylotrupes socrates, Dorcus titanus, Goliathus, and dynastinae beetles also occurs, especially in Japan. There is also an online fan community, watching those fights in videos on different platforms. A YouTube community also strives in creating content for insect-fighting.

== In popular culture ==
Japanese Bug-Fights (世界最強虫王決定戦) is a DVD series featuring various kinds of insects, arachnids, and other creatures battling to the death in a small plastic arena. Only two bugs participate in a fight at a time, and most fights end with one bug killing its opponent. In some cases, the fights end in a draw if neither bug is able to kill its opponent. Japanese Bug Fights was created by Fuyuki Shindo in November 2004 and was rebooted in June 2009 as Mushikotei until it was cancelled in October 2009. A cancellation DVD series was also planned before the series was being cancelled featuring Rhino Beetles and Stag Beetles.

Mushiking: The King of Beetles (甲虫王者ムシキング) is a collectible card arcade game developed by Sega, first introduced in 2003. The game involves battles between cards describing various species of beetle. The cards can be scanned in by a Mushiking arcade machine, which will both carry out battles and dispense new cards. An associated manga series, Game Boy Advance, and Nintendo DS game were also released. A reference to Mushiking can also be found in the 2016 video game Yakuza Kiwami.

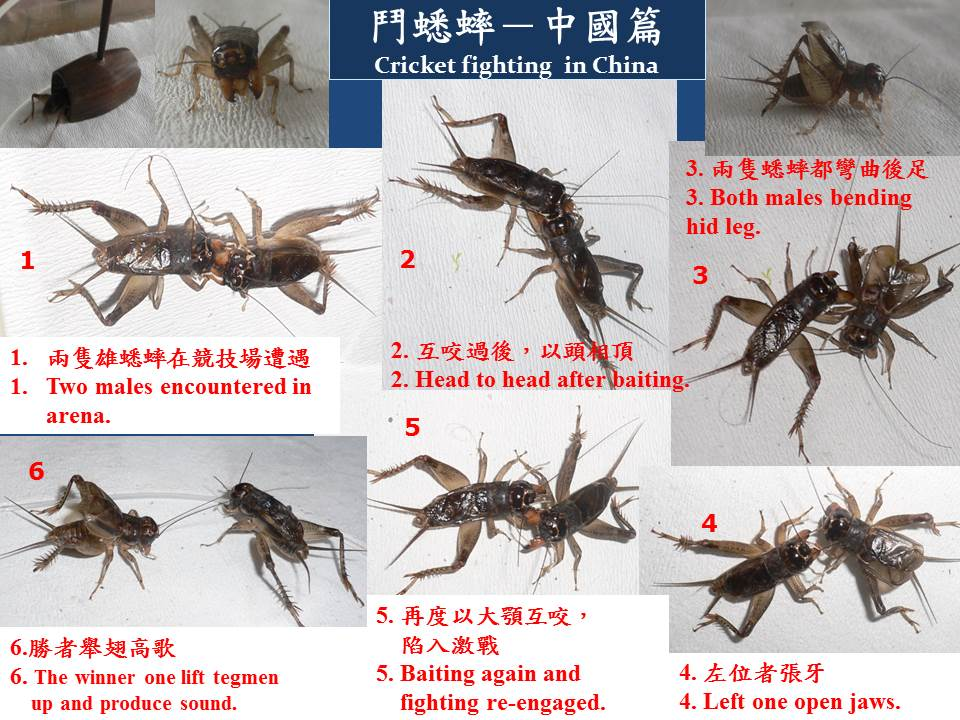
Cricket-fighting in China.

The Chinese Cricket Championships is an annual cricket-fighting competition held in Beijing. It lasts for two days and usually takes place during autumn, when crickets are said to be at their prime age. Significant investment is put into making sure the crickets can perform at their best. It is said that the crickets are given a diet of bean paste and water to help with their training. Crickets are divided into weight classes, much like how human fighters are divided in boxing and mixed martial arts.

== Betting ==
At many insect fights, gamblers stake money on an insect. Betting on insect fighting is illegal in many places and has occasionally led to arrests and casualties.

In November 2018, the New York Post reported that an illegal cricket fighting ring was discovered in a casino featuring bets that went up to $140,000; two arrests were made.

In the Philippines, one man was killed and another injured when shots were fired after a dispute over the winnings.

== See also ==
- Spider fighting
- Monster Bug Wars
