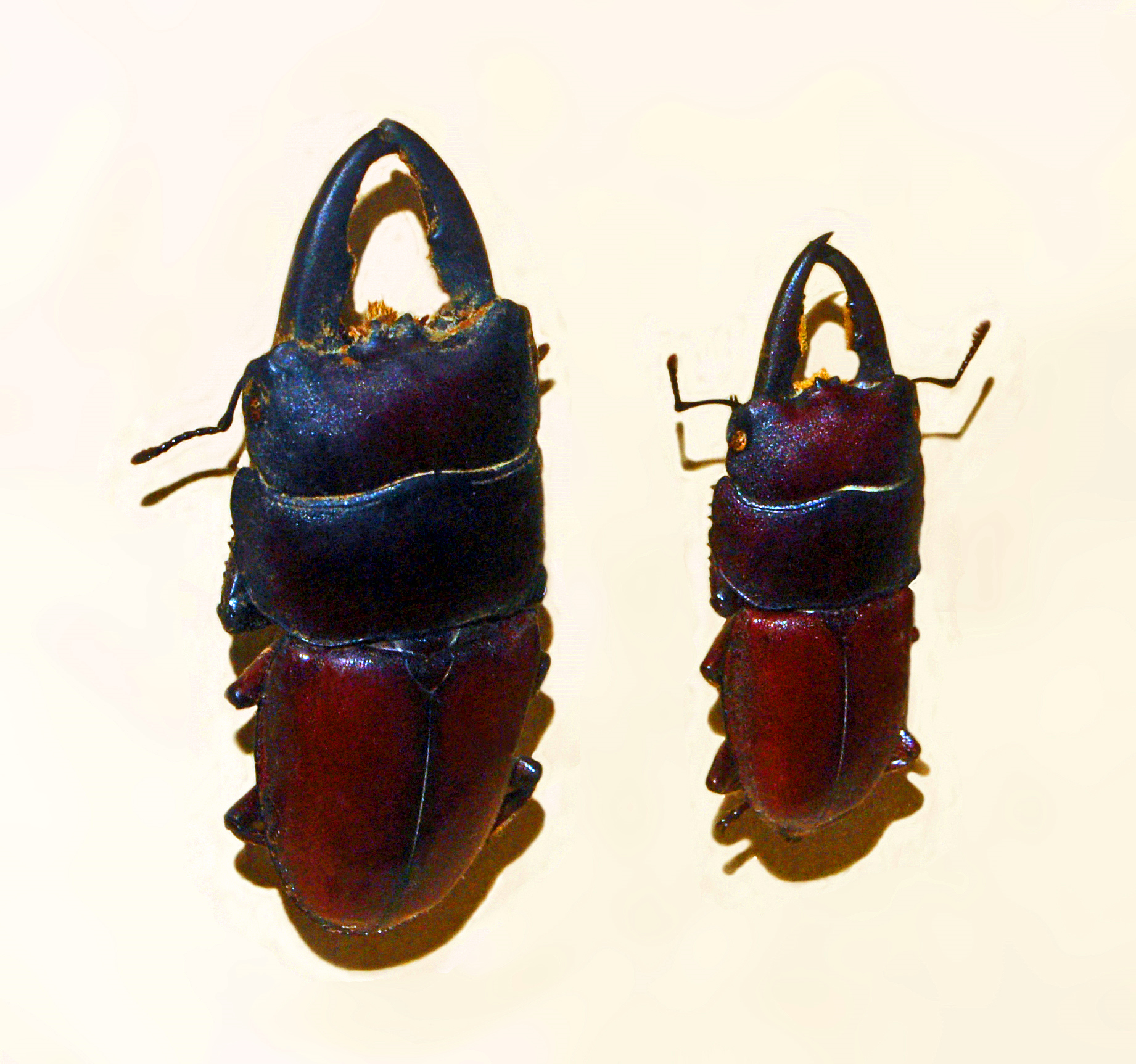
- S. t. gyphaetus from Java

Scientific classification
- Domain: Eukaryota
- Kingdom: Animalia
- Phylum: Arthropoda
- Class: Insecta
- Order: Coleoptera
- Suborder: Polyphaga
- Infraorder: Scarabaeiformia
- Family: Lucanidae
- Genus: Serrognathus
- Species: S. taurus

Binomial name
- Serrognathus taurus (Fabricius, 1801)

Synonyms
- Dorcus taurus (Fabricius, 1801); Lucanus inermis Fabricius, 1801; Lucanus taurus Fabricius, 1801

= Serrognathus taurus =

Species of beetle

Serrognathus taurus is a species of beetle belonging to the family Lucanidae which was described by Johan Christian Fabricius in 1801.

== Description ==
Serrognathus taurus reaches a length of about 50–60 millimetres (2.0–2.4 in) in males and about 40–45 millimetres (1.6–1.8 in) in females. In males the head is large with large jaws. The head and the pronotum are dark brown, while elytra are clearer.

== Distribution ==
Serrognathus taurus can be found in Philippines, Indonesia and Malaysia.

== Subspecies ==
The following subspecies are recognised:

- Serrognathus taurus cribriceps (Chevrolat, 1841) – Luzón, Negros, Mindoro and Mindanao
- Serrognathus taurus gypaetus (Laporte de Castelnau, 1840) – Java
- Serrognathus taurus jampeanus (Mizunuma in Mizunuma and Shinji Nagai, 1994) – Sulawesi
- Serrognathus taurus minor (Okuda, 2013)
- Serrognathus taurus moinieri (Lacroix, 1983)
- Serrognathus taurus subtaurus Maes, 1992
- Serrognathus taurus taurus (Fabricius, 1801) – Sumatra and Malay Peninsula

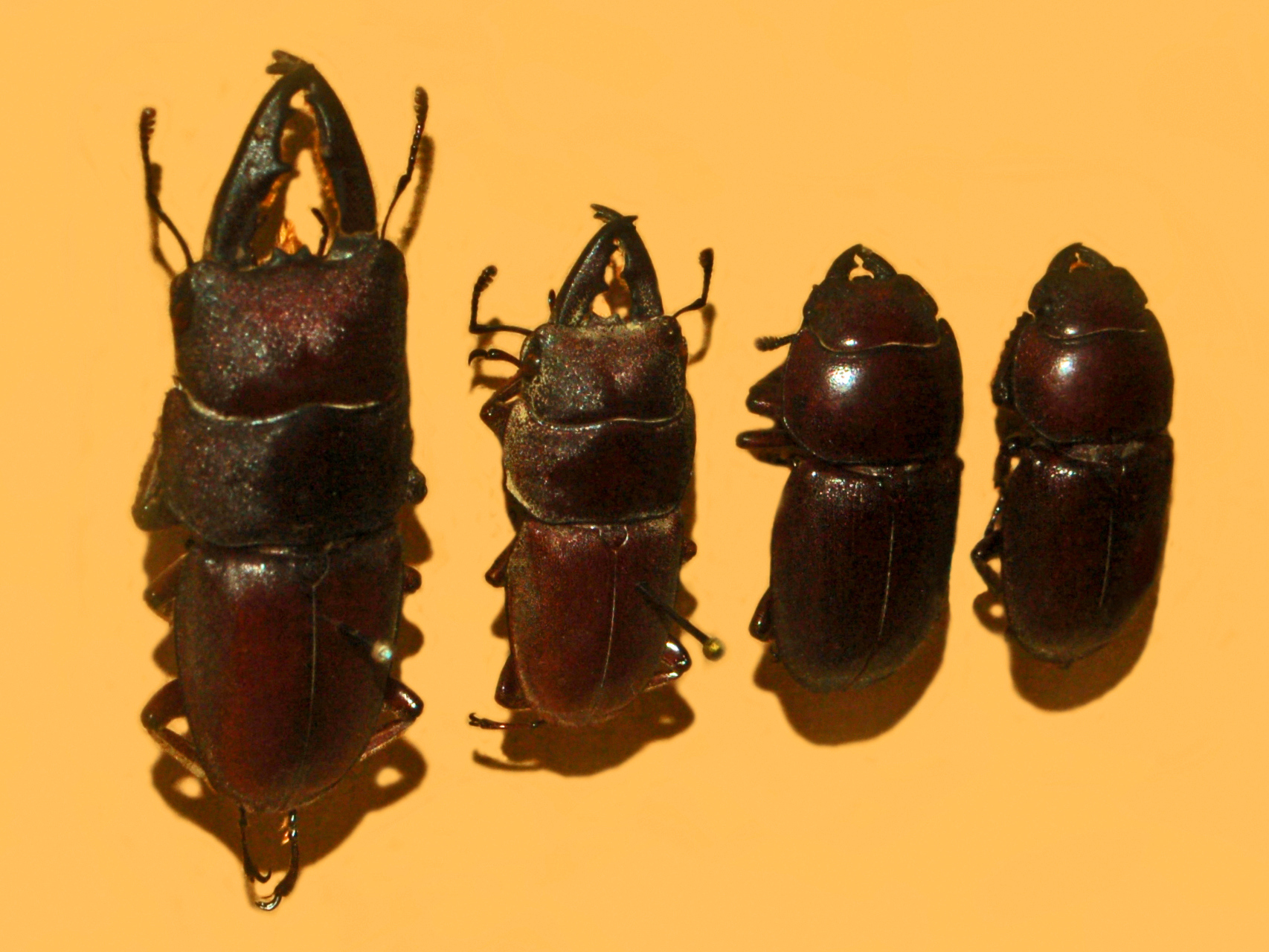
Dorcus taurus taurus from Sumatra, males and females
