= José Gomes =

José Gomes may refer to:

== Artist and entertainers ==
- José Gomes Ferreira (1900–1985), Portuguese poet and fiction writer
- José Pedro Gomes (born 1951), Portuguese actor, author and theatre director

== Sportspeople ==
=== Association football ===
- José Gomes (football manager) (born 1970), Portuguese football manager for Marítimo
- José Gomes (footballer, born 1976), Portuguese football manager and former right-back
- José Gomes (footballer, born 1996), Portuguese football left-back for Nacional
- José Gomes (footballer, born 1999), Portuguese football striker for Universitatea Cluj, on loan from CFR Cluj

=== Other sports ===
- Joe Gomes (Joseph Oliver Gomes, born Jose Gomes, 1908–1986), American baseball player
- José Gomes (judoka) (born 1954), Portuguese Olympic judoka
- José Gomes (volleyball) (born 1994), Portuguese volleyball player on 2014 FIVB Volleyball World League squad

== See also ==
- José Gómez (disambiguation)
