= José Gómez (activist) =

American labor and civil rights activist and educator

- Born: Joseph Gómez; September 28, 1943; Colorado, U.S.
- Died: September 14, 2014 (aged 70)
- Resting place: Mount Calvary Cemetery, Portland, Oregon, U.S.
- Education: University of Wyoming (BA); Harvard University (JD)
- Occupations: Labor and civil rights activist; educator

José Gómez (born Joseph Gómez, September 28, 1943 – September 14, 2014) was an American labor and civil rights activist and educator. He was most widely known for his work as executive assistant to president of the United Farm Workers Cesar Chavez, for founding the Committee on Gay Legal Issues (COGLI) at Harvard Law School, and for his law review article "The Public Expression of Lesbian/Gay Personhood as Protected Speech."

== Early life and education ==
José Gómez was born September 28, 1943, in Colorado and grew up in Wyoming. He was the son of Juan Gonzalez Gómez and Mercedes Aragon Gómez, and was one of ten children. His early childhood was spent in Reliance, Wyoming. Juan G. Gómez worked in coal mines until 1954, when mine closures led him to seek agricultural work in Wyoming's Big Horn Basin. The family settled in Worland, Wyoming where Juan G. and Mercedes A. Gómez and their children labored in sugar beet fields. At the time, Worland segregated its primary school children and operated a school called the Mexican School. In 1954, José and his sister Rosa Gómez were the first Latino/a students to attend the Emmett School rather than the Mexican School. Observing the difference between the education he received versus that offered in the Mexican School impressed upon Gómez the capacity of education to offer an escape from poverty, and he resolved to become an educator.

Gómez enrolled at the University of Wyoming and earned a B.A. in 1965 with emphases in Spanish, Journalism, and Education. He began graduate studies in Spanish and Latin American Literature at the University of Wyoming and in 1966–1967 was awarded a Fulbright Program grant to study Latin American literature in Nicaragua. The year in Nicaragua deepened his critique of U.S. foreign policy in Latin America. He returned to Laramie for the 1967–1968 academic year, but in the context of the Civil Rights Movement and opposition to United States Involvement in the Vietnam War he suspended graduate studies and moved toward activism.

== Career and Activism ==
From May 1968-April 1969 Gómez served as a Peace Corps Volunteer in the northeast state of Sergipe, Brazil. He trained elementary school teachers and organized literacy classes. His opposition to U.S. foreign policy coupled with his discomfort with the policies of the Brazilian military government led him to resign from the Peace Corps after one year. He traveled to San José, Costa Rica where he took a teaching position at Lincoln School, an international secondary school.

On July 4, 1969 TIME Magazine published a cover story on Cesar Chavez and the United Farm Workers Organizing Committee. Inspired by this story, Gómez resolved to join the movement, and he resigned his teaching post effective December 1969. Gómez made his way to the headquarters of the United Farm Workers Organizing Committee (later the United Farm Workers or UFW) and was charged to organize consumer boycotts of produce in New Jersey (1970), Washington DC (1971) and New York City (1972). During these years he was also active in the anti-war movement, and in 1971 he traveled to Cuba as part of the 4th contingent of the Venceremos Brigade. From January 1973-February 1975 Gómez served as executive assistant to president of the UFW Cesar Chavez.

Gómez left the UFW to work in the office of Governor Jerry Brown, serving as liaison to the Spanish-speaking community of Southern California from March 1975-August 1977. He left the Governor's office to enter Harvard Law School.

Between his first and second year at Harvard Gómez clerked at the San Francisco-based National Gay Rights Advocates. Collaborating with a team of law students to prepare for strategic LGBT civil rights litigation set the course for the next decade of his career. Upon his return to Harvard Law School in September 1978 he founded a student organization known initially as the Committee on Gay Legal Issues (COGLI, later renamed Lambda). Together with Barbara Kritchevsky and other activists, the group successfully pressured Harvard Law School to amend its non-discrimination policy to include gays and lesbians. The group also succeeded in convincing Harvard Law School to ban the U.S. military from access to its career center, on the grounds that the military's exclusion of LGBT service members violated Law School policy. This action by Harvard Law School and other institutions of higher education was followed by action in the U.S. Congress which, via the Solomon Amendment of 1996, required educational institutions that receive federal funds to allow military recruitment on their campuses.

Gómez was also active in the wider Boston community, volunteering as a founding board member of Gay & Lesbian Advocates & Defenders (GLAD) from 1979 to 1981. He entered the national stage as a board member of the National Gay Task Force, later renamed National LGBTQ Task Force, from 1979 to 1984, serving as co-chair from 1982 to 1984.

In 1981 Gómez earned his J.D. from Harvard Law School and returned to San Francisco. In 1983 he was the first openly gay candidate elected to the national board of the American Civil Liberties Union (ACLU) and he published an influential law review article "The Public Expression of Lesbian/Gay Personhood as Protected Speech." Also in 1983 he published the chapter "First Amendment" in Sexual Orientation and the Law, revised and co-written with Mary Dunlap for the 2006 edition.

From 1981 to 1983 Gómez worked as executive director of the Human Rights Foundation, a group established by San Francisco donors in the wake of the defeat of California Proposition 6, popularly known as the Briggs Initiative. That initiative aspired to ban from employment in California public schools any LGBT person and any person who supported LGBT rights. The Human Rights Foundation sought to create a supportive environment in public schools for LGBT students. Gómez organized a speaker's bureau and co-wrote and edited a resource book, Demystifying Homosexuality: A Teaching Guide about Lesbians and Gay Men.

In 1983 Gómez was named executive director of the legal services agency La Raza Centro Legal in San Francisco. He held that post until 1988, when he took a position as academic dean at The Evergreen State College.

Gómez served as dean from 1988 to 1996, after which time he joined the faculty. He taught law at The Evergreen State College from 1997 to his death.

== Award and Distinctions ==
Harvard Law School's Lambda, at its 25th anniversary in 2003, bestowed upon Gómez its Distinguished Alumni Award.

In 2006 Gómez delivered the faculty commencement address at The Evergreen State College.

== Death ==
Gómez died September 14, 2014 after a battle with cancer. He is buried at Mount Calvary Cemetery in Portland, Oregon.
