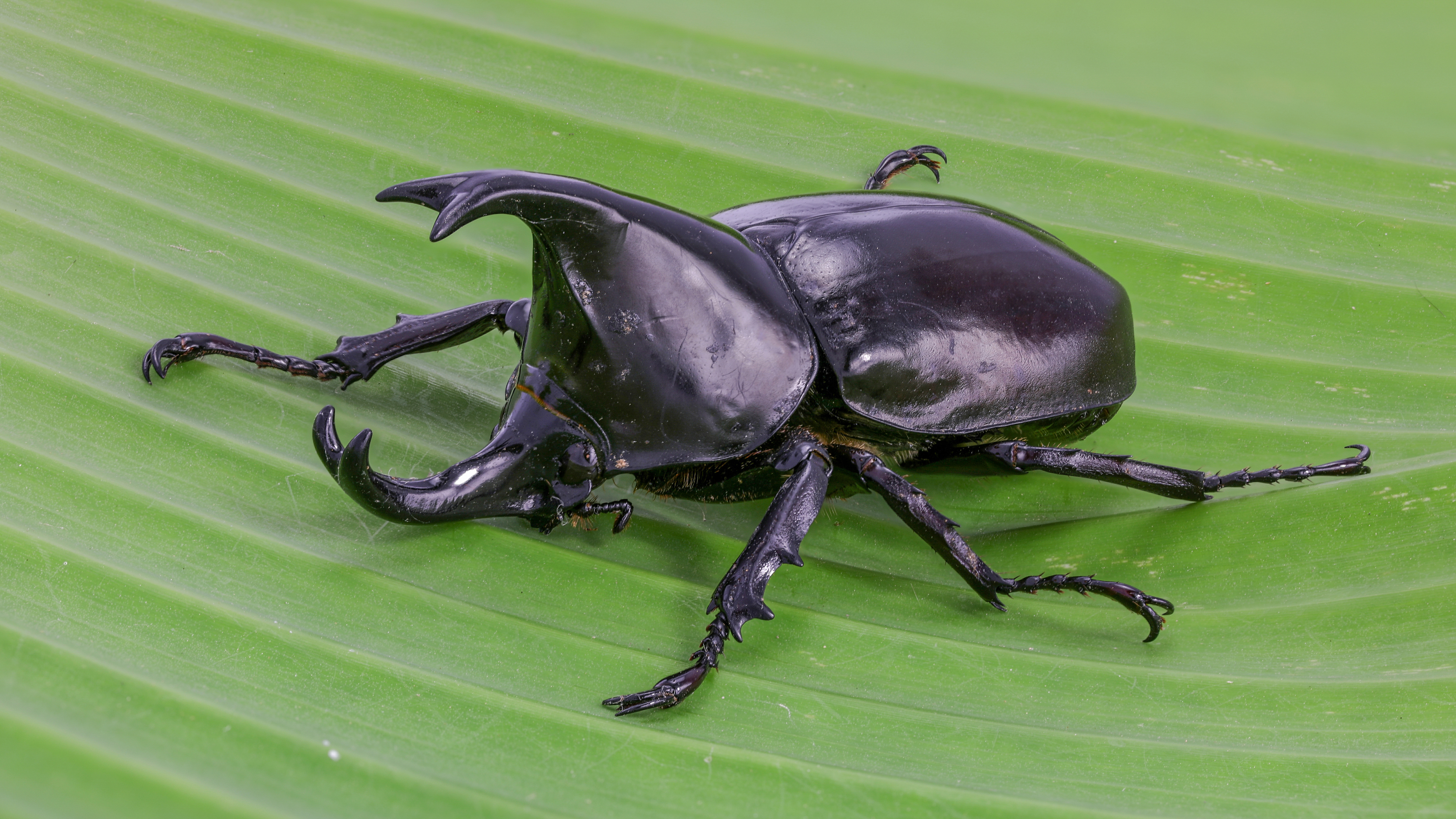
- Adult male

Scientific classification
- Kingdom: Animalia
- Phylum: Arthropoda
- Clade: Pancrustacea
- Class: Insecta
- Order: Coleoptera
- Suborder: Polyphaga
- Infraorder: Scarabaeiformia
- Family: Scarabaeidae
- Genus: Xylotrupes
- Species: X. socrates

Binomial name
- Xylotrupes socrates Schaufuss, 1864

Synonyms
- Xylotrupes sokrates Schaufuss, 1864

= Xylotrupes socrates =

Species of beetle

Xylotrupes socrates, commonly known as the Siamese rhinoceros beetle or fighting beetle (Thai: กว่างชน), is a species of large scarab beetle belonging to the subfamily Dynastinae. It is particularly known for its role in insect fighting in Thailand.

== Description ==
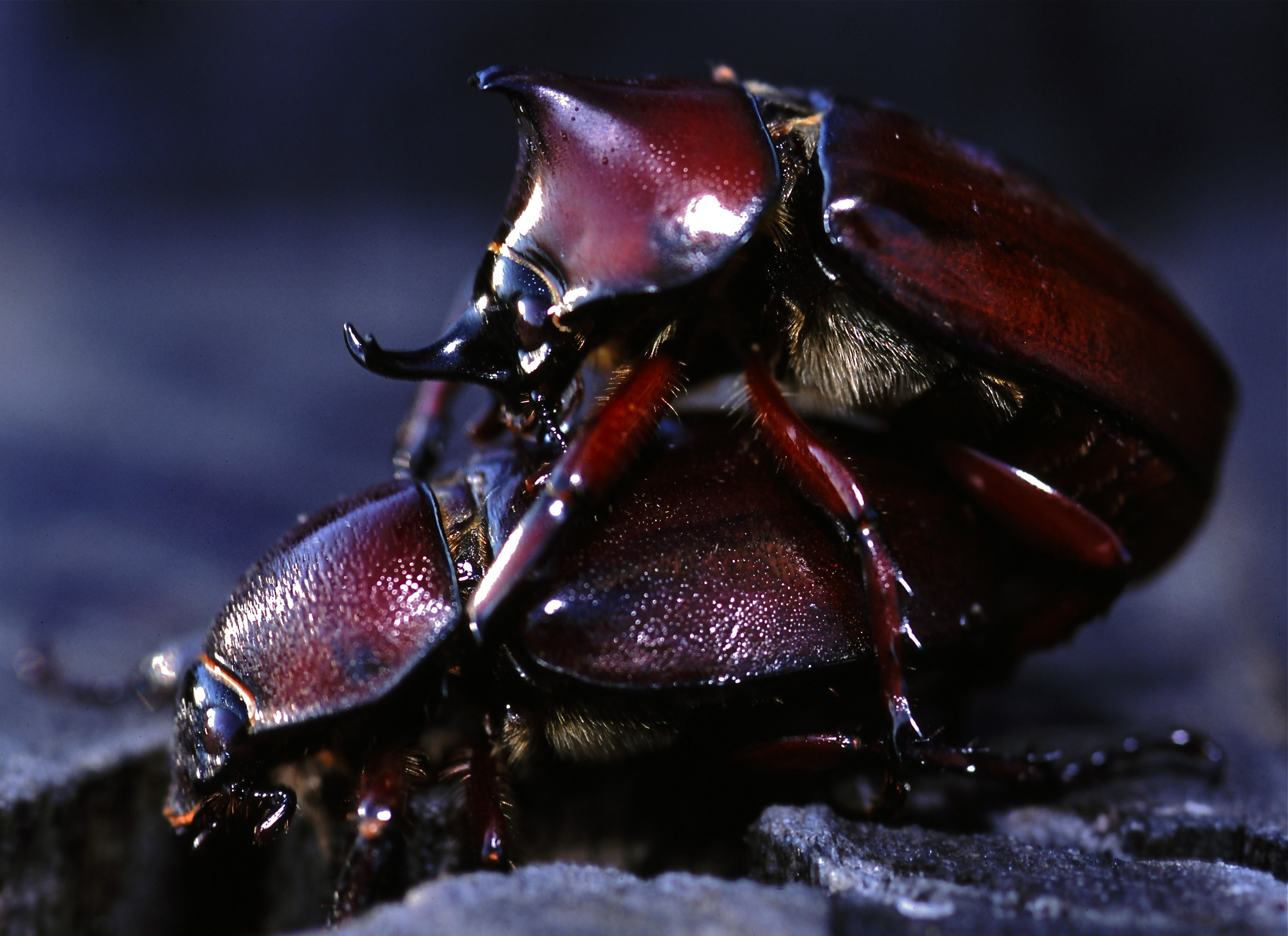
Mating

Behavior of an adult male, including walking and defensive hissing (video)

Like most dynastid beetles, the adult male of X. socrates possesses two horns: one on the head and another on the pronotum, both bifurcate and curling inward. Adult females lack these horns. Both sexes have dark chestnut-brown (in younger beetles) or black (in older beetles) exoskeletons and elytra.

== Distribution ==
The species is widespread in south-east Asian countries such as Bangladesh, Cambodia, China, India, Laos, Myanmar, Nepal, Thailand, and Vietnam.

== Beetle fighting ==
These beetles are used for staging beetle fights, a traditional form of entertainment popular in the northern region of Thailand. They are captured and trained to become stronger and more aggressive. In the fight the beetle that lifts its opponent up by its horns wins. A beetle may also win if his opponent crawls away, falls, or is overturned. Insect fighting is mostly practiced in the Chiang Mai and Nan provinces of Thailand. It is also popular in Myanmar and Northern Laos. Spectators typically place bets on the fights. Insect fighting coaches claim their activity provides a free pastime while drawing attention to insects that would otherwise have been ignored or simply killed as pests.
