= Ailton Silva (football manager) =

Brazilian football manager

Personal information
- Full name: Ailton dos Santos Silva
- Date of birth: 31 October 1966 (age 59)
- Place of birth: São Paulo, Brazil

Team information
- Current team: Mixto (head coach)

Managerial career
- Years: Team
- 2011: River Plate-SE
- 2012–2013: São Caetano
- 2013–2014: Mogi Mirim
- 2014: Ferroviária
- 2014–2015: Portuguesa
- 2015: Mogi Mirim
- 2016: Juventus
- 2017: Itabaiana
- 2017: Campinense
- 2017–2018: Confiança
- 2018–2019: Juazeirense
- 2019: Chiangrai United
- 2021–2022: Chiangmai United
- 2023: Kelantan United
- 2024: Itabaiana
- 2024–: Mixto

Ailton dos Santos Silva (born 31 October 1966) is a Brazilian football coach, who is the current head coach of Mixto.

== Managerial career ==
Born in São Paulo, Silva began his managerial career at São Paulo Futebol Center, a São Paulo youth system based in Osasco, in 1996. In 2005, he joined Palmeiras, also taking care of the club's youth setup.

Silva left Verdão in 2007, and moved to Spanish Tercera División side CF Atlético Ciudad, being appointed as a sports director. He returned to his homeland in the following year, being named Santo André's assistant manager.

After being in the staff of São Bento, Desportivo Brasil and Portuguesa, Silva was appointed River Plate-SE manager on 1 February 2011. He led the latter to their second Campeonato Sergipano title of its history, and also managed the side in both Série D and Copa do Brasil.

Silva moved to São Caetano in the following year, as an assistant manager. In November, he was appointed as caretaker, replacing fired Émerson Leão.

Silva was relieved from his duties on 5 February 2013, but returned to Azulão on 13 March. He was sacked again on the 28th, and moved to Mogi Mirim on 16 May.

Silva was sacked on 27 February 2014, and was appointed Ferroviária manager on 1 August. He was relieved from his duties on 2 October, and signed for Portuguesa on 15 December.

On 6 April 2015 Silva was dismissed, with Lusa being almost relegated. On 1 June he returned to Mogi Mirim, replacing fired Edinho. He subsequently worked at Juventus, Itabaiana, Campinense, Confiança and Juazeirense.

In October 2019, Silva was appointed Chiangrai United manager, and led the club to their first-ever Thai League 1 accolade. The following July, he switched teams and countries again, taking over Hồ Chí Minh City in Vietnam.

== Managerial statistics ==
As of 4 November 2023

Managerial record by team and tenure
| Team | From | To | Record | | | | |
| Team | From | To | G | W | D | L | Win % |
|---|---|---|---|---|---|---|---|
| (Thailand) Chiangrai United | 11 February 2019 | 12 November 2019 | 40 | 23 | 12 | 5 | 57.50 |
| (Thailand) Chiangmai United | 10 October 2021 | 4 February 2022 | 13 | 2 | 1 | 10 | 15.38 |
| (Malaysia) Kelantan United | 15 June 2023 | 21 November 2023 | 15 | 4 | 3 | 8 | 26.67 |
| Career totals | | | 68 | 29 | 16 | 23 | 42.65 |

== Honours ==
River Plate-SE

- Campeonato Sergipano: 2011

Chiangrai United

- Thai League 1: 2019

Individual

- Thai League 1 Coach of the Month: August 2019
- Thai League 1 Coach of the Year: 2019
