= 2019 Thailand Amateur League =

List of football clubs in 2019 Thai Amateur football league

The 2019 Thailand Amateur League (Thai:ไทยแลนด์ อเมเจอร์ลีก) is the third season of the League competition since its establishment in 2017. It is in the fifth tier of the Thai football league system. This season has had 230 clubs join the nationwide amateur tournament.

== Tournament format ==
The tournament will be divided into 12 sub-regions with 3 stages in each sub-regions.

Qualification stage: This method will be applied when there are more than eight clubs in a sub-regions. This can be both one-legged knockout or on a round-robin basis depending on the number of participating clubs in the sub-regions.

Group stage: This round divided eight qualified clubs into two groups and play in single round-robin. Only the group winners will qualify for the next stage.

Final stage: The groups winners play against each other in one-legged match. The winners of the sub-region will play in the regional final against the winner from another sub-region which is in the same region to decide the club to promote to 2020 Thai League 4. 30-minute extra time and penalty shoot-out will be applied after the match is still in tie respectively.

== Upper northern subregion ==
=== Qualification stage ===
Group A1

Pos	Team	Pld	W	D	L	GF	GA	GD	Pts	Qualification or relegation
1	Viangping Rangers	2	1	1	0	6	3	+3	4	Group stage
2	Unseen Lamphun United	2	1	1	0	3	1	+2	4	Group stage
3	Sankamphaeng Soccer Chiang Mai	2	0	0	2	2	7	−5	0	

Updated to match(es) played on unknown. Source: []
Rules for classification: 1) points; 2) goal difference; 3) number of goals scored.
17 August 2019
13:00 (UTC+7:00)

Sankampang Soccer Club Chiang Mai	2–5	Wiangping Rangers

Chiang Rai PAO Stadium Pitch 1, Chiang Rai
25 August 2019
16:00 (UTC+7)

Wiangping Rangers	1–1	Unseen Lamphun United

Lamphun PAO Stadium, Lamphun
1 September 2019
16:00

Unseen Lamphun United	2–0	Sankampang Soccer Chiang Mai

Lamphun PAO Stadium, Lamphun

Group A2

Pos	Team	Pld	W	D	L	GF	GA	GD	Pts	Qualification or relegation
1	Chiangrai Lanna	2	2	0	0	11	2	+9	6	Group stage
2	Chiang Mai City	2	1	1	0	5	8	−3	4	
3	Debsirin	0	0	0	0	4	10	−6	0	

Updated to match(es) played on unknown. Source: []
Rules for classification: 1) points; 2) goal difference; 3) number of goals scored.
17 August 2019
16:00 (UTC+7:00)

Chiangrai Lanna	6–0	Chiang Mai City

Chiang Rai PAO Stadium Pitch 1, Chiang Rai
25 August 2019
13:00 (UTC+7)

Chiang Mai City	5–2	Debsirin Chiang Mai

Lamphun PAO Stadium, Lamphun
1 September 2019
16:00

Debsirin Chiang Mai	2–5	Chiangrai Lanna

Chiang Rai PAO Stadium Pitch 1, Chiang Rai

Group A3

Pos	Team	Pld	W	D	L	GF	GA	GD	Pts	Qualification or relegation
1	Chiang Rai Dragon VBAC	2	2	0	0	6	1	+5	6	Group stage
2	Christ F.C.	2	1	0	1	1	2	−1	3	
3	Chiang Mai Coaching	2	0	0	2	1	5	−4	0	

Updated to match(es) played on unknown. Source: []
Rules for classification: 1) points; 2) goal difference; 3) number of goals scored.
17 August 2019
16:00 (UTC+7:00)

Christ F.C.	1–0	Chiang Mai Coaching

Huai Ma Stadium, Phrae
25 August 2019
13:00 (UTC+7)

Chiang Mai Coaching	1–4	Chiang Rai Dragon VBAC

Chiang Mai University Stadium, Chiang Mai
1 September 2019
13:00

Chiang Rai Dragon VBAC	2–0	Christ F.C.

Huai Ma Stadium, Phrae

Group B1

Pos	Team	Pld	W	D	L	GF	GA	GD	Pts	Qualification or relegation
1	Chiang Mai Dream F.C.	2	2	0	0	7	1	+6	6	Group stage
2	Phayao	2	1	0	1	3	2	+1	3	
3	Pualand	2	0	0	2	0	7	−7	0	

Updated to match(es) played on unknown. Source: []
Rules for classification: 1) points; 2) goal difference; 3) number of goals scored.
17 August 2019
16:00 (UTC+7:00)

Phayao	2–0	Pualand

Phayao Stadium, Phayao
25 August 2019
16:00 (UTC+7)

Chiang Mai Dream	2–1	Phayao

Chiang Mai University Stadium, Chiang Mai
1 September 2019.
13:00

Chiang Mai Dream	5–0	Pualand

Lamphun PAO Stadium, Lamphun

Group B2

Pos	Team	Pld	W	D	L	GF	GA	GD	Pts	Qualification or relegation
1	Singha Nuea Chiang Mai	2	1	1	0	1	0	+1	4	Group stage
2	North Vachiralai Chiang Mai	2	0	2	0	0	0	0	2	
3	P.R.C. S.C.	2	0	1	1	0	1	−1	1	

Updated to match(es) played on unknown. Source: []
Rules for classification: 1) points; 2) goal difference; 3) number of goals scored.
17 August 2019
13:00 (UTC+7:00)

North Vachiralai Chiang Mai United	0–0	PRC Soccer Club

Huai Ma Stadium, Phrae
25 August 2019
13:00 (UTC+7)

PRC Soccer Club	0–1	Singha Nuea Chiang Mai

Huai Ma Stadium, Phrae
1 September 2019
13:00

Singha Nuea Chiang Mai	0–0	North Vachiralai Chiang Mai United

Chiang Rai PAO Stadium Pitch 1, Chiang Rai

Group B3

Pos	Team	Pld	W	D	L	GF	GA	GD	Pts	Qualification or relegation
1	J.T. F.C.	2	2	0	0	5	1	+4	6	Group stage
2	Thung Hong United	2	1	0	1	7	4	+3	3	Group stage
3	Piyamitr	2	0	0	2	0	7	−7	0	

Updated to match(es) played on unknown. Source: []
Rules for classification: 1) points; 2) goal difference; 3) number of goals scored.
17 August 2019
13:00 (UTC+7:00)

Piyamitr	0–1	JT F.C.

Phayao Stadium, Phayao
25 August 2019
16:00 (UTC+7)

JT F.C.	4–1	Thung Hong United

Huai Ma Stadium, Phrae
1 September 2019
16:00

Thung Hong United	6–0	Piyamitr

Huai Ma Stadium, Phrae

=== Group stage ===
Group A

Pos	Team	Pld	W	D	L	GF	GA	GD	Pts	Qualification or relegation
1	Chiangrai Lanna	3	2	1	0	10	2	+8	7	Sub-regional final
2	Wiangping Rangers	3	2	0	1	5	4	+1	6	
3	Unseen Lamphun United	3	1	0	2	4	11	−7	3	
4	Chiang Rai Dragon VBAC	3	0	1	2	4	6	−2	1	

Updated to match(es) played on unknown. Source: []
Rules for classification: 1) points; 2) goal difference; 3) number of goal scored.
7 September 2019
13:00

Chiang Rai Dragon VBAC	1–2	Unseen Lamphun United

Chiang Rai PAO Stadium Pitch 1, Chiang Rai
7 September 2019
16:00

Wiangping Rangers	0–1	Chiangrai Lanna

Chiang Rai PAO Stadium Pitch 1, Chiang Rai
15 September 2019
13:00

Wiangping Rangers	2–1	Chiang Rai Dragon VBAC

Lamphun PAO Stadium, Lamphun
15 September 2019
16:00

Unseen Lamphun United	0–7	Chiangrai Lanna

Lamphun PAO Stadium, Lamphun
21 September 2019
16:00

Unseen Lamphun United	2–3	Wiangping Rangers

Huai Ma Stadium, Phrae
21 September 2019
16:00

Chiangrai Lanna	2–2	Chiang Rai Dragon VBAC

Chiang Rai PAO Stadium Pitch 1, Chiang Rai

Group B

Pos	Team	Pld	W	D	L	GF	GA	GD	Pts	Qualification or relegation
1	JT F.C.	3	2	0	1	6	5	+1	6	Sub-regional final
2	Singh Nuea Chiang Mai	3	2	0	1	6	2	+4	6	
3	Chiang Mai Dream	3	1	1	1	6	5	+1	4	
4	Thung Hong United	3	0	1	2	2	8	−6	1	

Updated to match(es) played on unknown. Source: []
Rules for classification: 1) points; 2) goal difference; 3) number of goal scored.
7 September 2019
13:00

JT	2–1	Thung Hong United

Chiang Mai University Stadium, Chiang Mai
7 September 2019
16:00

Chiang Mai Dream	1–2	Singh Nuea Chiang Mai

Chiang Mai University Stadium, Chiang Mai
15 September 2019
13:00

JT	2–4	Chiang Mai Dream

Chiang Mai Municipality Stadium, Chiang Mai
15 September 2019
16:00

Singh Nuea Chiang Mai	5–0	Thung Hong United

Chiang Mai Municipality Stadium, Chiang Mai
21 September 2019
13:00

Thung Hong United	1–1	Chiang Mai Dream

Huai Ma Stadium, Phrae
21 September 2019
13:00

JT	2–0	Singh Nuea Chiang Mai
	Forfeited

Chiang Rai PAO Stadium Pitch 1, Chiang Rai

The actual result is a 2-2 draw, but Singh Nuea Chiang Mai was 0-2 forfeited due to fielding an ineligible player.

== Lower northern subregion ==
=== Play-off round ===
Play-off round
TBD
13:00 (UTC+7)

Paknampho F.C.	2–0	Bueng Sam Pan F.C.

Nakhon Sawan Sports School Stadium, Nakhon Sawan

=== Qualifying round ===
Group A1

Pos	Team	Pld	W	D	L	GF	GA	GD	Pts	Qualification or relegation
1	The Built Petchabun Patriots	2	1	1	0	6	3	+3	4	Group stage
2	Sawankhalok United	2	1	1	0	3	2	+1	4	
3	Pichaya Bundit College	2	0	0	2	1	5	−4	0	

Updated to match(es) played on unknown. Source: []
Rules for classification: 1) points; 2) goal difference; 3) number of goals scored.
17 August 2019
16:00 (UTC+7:00)

Sawankhalok United	1–0	Pichaya Bundit College

Sawankhalok Prachasan Municipality School Stadium, Sukhothai
24 August 2019
13:00 (UTC+7)

Pichaya Bundit College	1–4	The built Petchabun Patriots

Kamphangphet F.C. Training Ground, Kamphangphet
31 August 2019
16:00 (UTC+7)

The Built Petchabun Patriots	2–2	Sawankhalok United

Sawankhalok Prachasan Municipality School Stadium, Sukhothai

Group A2

Pos	Team	Pld	W	D	L	GF	GA	GD	Pts	Qualification or relegation
1	Sri Nakhon Town	2	1	1	0	3	2	+1	4	Group stage
2	See Kwae	2	1	0	1	3	2	+1	3	
3	Lomsak United	2	0	1	1	1	3	−2	1	

Updated to match(es) played on unknown. Source: []
Rules for classification: 1) points; 2) goal difference; 3) number of goals scored.
17 August 2019
16:00 (UTC+7)

Si Kwae	1–2	Sri Nakhon Town

Nakhon Sawan Sports School Stadium, Nakhon Sawan
24 August 2019
16:00 (UTC+7)

Sri Nakhon Town	1–1	Lomsak United

Kamphangphet F.C. Training Ground, Kamphangphet
31 August 2019
16:00 (UTC+7)

Lomsak United	0–2	Si Kwae

Nakhon Sawan Sports School Stadium, Nakhon Sawan

Group A3

Pos	Team	Pld	W	D	L	GF	GA	GD	Pts	Qualification or relegation
1	Northern Tak United*	2	1	1	0	3	1	+2	4	Group stage
2	PL Tech Pitsanulok	2	1	1	0	3	1	+2	4	
3	Uttaradit Rajabhat University	2	0	0	2	0	4	−4	0	

Updated to match(es) played on unknown. Source: []
Rules for classification: 1) points; 2) goal difference; 3) number of goals scored.
17 August 2019
16:00 (UTC+7:00)

Northern Tak United	2–0	Uttaradit Rajabhat University

Tak PAO Stadium, Tak
24 August 2019
13:00 (UTC+7)

Uttaradit Rajabhat University	0–2	PL Tech Pitsanulok

Naresuan University Stadium, Pitsanulok
31 August 2019
16:00 (UTC+7)

PL Tech Pitsanulok	1–1	Northern Tak United

Tak PAO Stadium, Tak

* Northern Tak United won the first place of the group due to better disciplinary points than PL Tech Pitsanulok.

Group A4

Pos	Team	Pld	W	D	L	GF	GA	GD	Pts	Qualification or relegation
1	Naresuan University	2	2	0	0	4	1	+3	6	Group stage
2	Pibunsongkram Rajabhat University	2	1	0	1	3	2	+1	3	
3	PS Baan Mor	2	0	0	2	0	4	−4	0	

Updated to match(es) played on unknown. Source: []
Rules for classification: 1) points; 2) goal difference; 3) number of goals scored.
17 August 2019
13:00 (UTC+7:00)

Pibunsongkhram Rajabhat University	2–0	PS Baan Mor

Tak PAO Stadium, Tak
24 August 2019
16:00 (UTC+7)

Naresuan University	2–0	PS Baan Mor

Naresuan University Stadium, Pitsanulok
31 August 2019
16:00 (UTC+7)

Naresuan University	2–1	Pibunsongkhram Rajabhat University

Naresuan University Stadium, Pitsanulok

Group B1

Pos	Team	Pld	W	D	L	GF	GA	GD	Pts	Qualification or relegation
1	Tak City	2	1	1	0	4	3	+1	4	Group stage
2	Pitsanulok United	2	1	1	0	2	1	+1	4	
3	PPK Sampheng Petchabun	2	0	0	2	4	6	−2	0	

Updated to match(es) played on unknown. Source: []
Rules for classification: 1) points; 2) goal difference; 3) number of goals scored.
17 August 2019
13:00 (UTC+7:00)

PPK Sampeng Petchabun	1–2	Pitsanulok United

Nakhon Sawan Sports School Stadium, Nakhon Sawan
25 August 2019
13:00 (UTC+7)

Pitsanulok United	0–0	Tak City

Kamphangphet F.C. Training Ground, Kamphangphet
31 August 2019
13:00 (UTC+7)

Tak City	4–3	PPK Sampheng Petchabun

Sawankhalok Prachasan Municipality School Stadium, Sukhothai

Group B2

Pos	Team	Pld	W	D	L	GF	GA	GD	Pts	Qualification or relegation
1	SA Pitsanulok	2	1	1	0	3	2	+1	4	Group stage
2	Lawoe United	2	1	0	1	4	4	0	3	
3	Nakvee	2	0	1	1	5	6	−1	1	

Updated to match(es) played on unknown. Source: []
Rules for classification: 1) points; 2) goal difference; 3) number of goals scored.
17 August 2019
13:00 (UTC+7:00)

Sports Association of Pitsanulok	1–0	Lawoe United

Sawankhalok Prachasan Municipality School Stadium, Sukhothai
25 August 2019
16:00 (UTC+7)

Lawoe United	4–3	Nakavee

Kamphangphet F.C. Training Ground, Kamphangphet
31 August 2019
13:00 (UTC+7)

Nakavee	2–2	Sports Association of Pitsanulok

Tak PAO Stadium, Tak

Group B3

Pos	Team	Pld	W	D	L	GF	GA	GD	Pts	Qualification or relegation
1	Nakhon Sawan	2	2	0	0	6	0	+6	6	Group stage
2	Chaiyaphum Warriors	2	1	0	1	4	3	+1	3	
3	Maesot City	2	0	0	2	1	8	−7	0	

Updated to match(es) played on unknown. Source: []
Rules for classification: 1) points; 2) goal difference; 3) number of goals scored.
17 August 2019
16:00 (UTC+7:00)

Maesot City	0–4	Nakhon Sawan

Nakhon Sawan Stadium, Nakhon Sawan
25 August 2019
16:00 (UTC+7)

Nakhon Sawan	2–0	Chaiyaphum Warriors

Nakhon Sawan Stadium, Nakhon Sawan
31 August 2019
13:00 (UTC+7)

Chaiyaphum Warriors	4–1	Maesot City

Naresuan University Stadium, Pitsanulok

Group B4

Pos	Team	Pld	W	D	L	GF	GA	GD	Pts	Qualification or relegation
1	Paknampho	2	1	1	0	6	4	+2	4	Group stage
2	Sukhothai NTSU	2	1	1	0	2	1	+1	4	
3	PPS Petchabun City	2	0	0	2	3	6	−3	0	

Updated to match(es) played on unknown. Source: []
Rules for classification: 1) points; 2) goal difference; 3) number of goals scored.
17 August 2019
13:00 (UTC+7:00)

PPS Petchabun City	0–1	Sukhothai NTSU

Nakhon Sawan Stadium, Nakhon Sawan
25 August 2019
13:00 (UTC+7)

Sukhothai NTSU	1–1	Paknampho

Nakhon Sawan Stadium, Nakhon Sawan
31 August 2019
13:00 (UTC+7)

Paknampho	5–3	PPS Petchabun City

Nakhon Sawan Sports School Stadium, Nakhon Sawan

=== Group stage ===
Group A

Pos	Team	Pld	W	D	L	GF	GA	GD	Pts	Qualification or relegation
1	Northern Tak United F.C.	3	2	1	0	9	1	+8	7	Sub-regional final
2	Naresuan University	3	2	1	0	6	3	+3	7	
3	The Built Petchabun Patriots	3	0	1	2	2	5	−3	1	
4	Sri Nakhon Town	3	0	1	2	2	10	−8	1	

Updated to match(es) played on unknown. Source: []
Rules for classification: 1) points; 2) goal difference; 3) number of goals scored.
8 September 2019
13:00

The Built Petchabun Patriots	1–1	Sri Nakhon Town

Tak PAO Stadium, Tak
8 September 2019
16:00

Northern Tak United	1–1	Naresuan University

Tak PAO Stadium, Tak
14 September 2019
13:00

Sri Nakhon Town	0–6	Northern Tak United

Naresuan University Stadium, Pitsanulok
14 September 2019
16:00

Naresuan University	2–1	The Built Petchabun Patriots

Naresuan University Stadium, Pitsanulok
22 September 2019
13:00

Naresuan University	3–1	Sri Nakhon Town

Nakhon Sawan Stadium, Nakhon Sawan
22 September 2019
13:00

The Built Petchabun Patriots	0–2	Northern Tak United

Tak PAO Stadium, Tak

Group B

Pos	Team	Pld	W	D	L	GF	GA	GD	Pts	Qualification or relegation
1	SA Pitsanulok	3	2	0	1	4	3	+1	6	Sub-regional final
2	Nakhon Sawan	3	1	1	1	9	7	+2	4	
3	Paknampho	3	1	1	1	7	3	+4	4	
4	Tak City	3	1	0	2	3	10	−7	3	

Updated to match(es) played on unknown. Source: []
Rules for classification: 1) points; 2) goal difference; 3) number of goals scored.
8 September 2019
13:00

Tak City	1–0	SA Pitsanulok

Nakhon Sawan Stadium, Nakhon Sawan
8 September 2019
16:00

Nakhon Sawan	2–2	Paknampho

Nakhon Sawan Stadium, Nakhon Sawan
14 September 2019
13:00

SA Pitsanulok	3–2	Nakhon Sawan

Nakhon Sawan Sports School Stadium, Nakhon Sawan
14 September 2019
16:00

Paknampho	5–0	Tak City

Nakhon Sawan Sports School Stadium, Nakhon Sawan
22 September 2019
16:00

Nakhon Sawan	5–2	Tak City

Nakhon Sawan Stadium, Nakhon Sawan
22 September 2019
16:00

Paknampho	0–1	SA Pitsanulok

Tak PAO Stadium, Tak

== Upper northeastern subregion ==
=== Play-off round ===
17 August 2019
13:00 (UTC+7:00)
Play-off to group A3

Debsirin Khon Kaen F.C.	0–4	Jumpasri United

Roi Et Stadium, Roi Et
17 August 2019
16:00 (UTC+7)
Play-off to group A4

Khon Kaen Sambaithao F.C.	1–0	Phon Commercial & Technical College F.C.

College of Asian Scholars Stadium, Khon Kaen
17 August 2019
13:00 (UTC+7:00)
Play-off to group A4

Mahasarakham Rajabhat University F.C.	4–0	Tai Loei United F.C.

College of Asian Scholars Stadium, Khon Kaen
18 August 2019
13:00 (UTC+7)
Play-off to group A4

Kalasin City	1–2	Techno Sawang

College of Asian Scholars Stadium, Khon Kaen
18 August 2019
16:00 (UTC+7)
Play-off to group B4

Chaiyaphum Hill United	1–2	Nadoon

Nong Bua Pichaya Training Ground, Nong Bua Lamphu

=== Qualification round ===
Group A1

Pos	Team	Pld	W	D	L	GF	GA	GD	Pts	Qualification or relegation
1	Chumpae	2	2	0	0	11	2	+9	6	Group stage
2	Udon Banjun United	2	1	0	1	7	2	+5	3	
3	Tigerkids Mukdahan United	2	0	0	2	3	17	−14	0	

Updated to match(es) played on unknown. Source: []
Rules for classification: 1) points; 2) goal difference; 3) number of goals scored.
17 August 2019
16:00 (UTC+7:00)

Chumpae	1–0	Udon Baan Jun United

Nong Bua Pichaya Training Ground, Nong Bua Lamphu
24 August 2019
16:00 (UTC+7)

Udon Baan Jun United	7–1	Tiger Kids Mukdahan United

Nong Bua Pichaya Training Ground, Nong Bua Lamphu
1 September 2019
16:00

Tiger Kids Mukdahan United	2–10	Chumpae

Roi Et Rajabhat University Stadium, Roi Et

Group A2

Pos	Team	Pld	W	D	L	GF	GA	GD	Pts	Qualification or relegation
1	Roi et 2018	2	2	0	0	4	1	+3	6	Group stage
2	Namphong United	2	1	0	1	9	2	+7	3	
3	Takhon City	2	0	0	2	0	10	−10	0	

Updated to match(es) played on unknown. Source: []
Rules for classification: 1) points; 2) goal difference; 3) number of goals scored.
17 August 2019
16:00 (UTC+7:00)

Roi Et 2018	2–1	Namphong United

Roi Et Stadium, Roi Et
24 August 2019
13:00 (UTC+7)

Namphong United	8–0	Takhon City

Roi Et Stadium, Roi Et
31 August 2019
16:00 (UTC+7)

Roi Et 2018	v	Takhon City

Prasert Songkhram Barrack Football Field, Roi Et
- The match between Roi Et 2018 and Takhon City is cancelled due to Takhon City didn't show up at the match.

Group A3

Pos	Team	Pld	W	D	L	GF	GA	GD	Pts	Qualification or relegation
1	Kranuan	2	2	0	0	7	1	+6	6	Group stage
2	Jumpasri United	2	1	0	1	4	4	0	3	
3	Munja Arena	2	0	0	2	1	7	−6	0	

Updated to match(es) played on unknown. Source: []
Rules for classification: 1) points; 2) goal difference; 3) number of goals scored.

1

17 August 2019
13:00 (UTC+7)

Manja Arena	0–4	Kranuan

Nong Bua Pichaya Training Ground, Nong Bua Lamphu

24 August 2019
13:00 (UTC+7)

Kranuan	3–1	Jumpasri United

College of Asian Scholars Stadium, Khon Kaen
28 August 2019
16:00 (UTC+7)

Jumpasri United	3–1	Manja Arena

Roi Et Stadium, Roi Et

Group A4

Pos	Team	Pld	W	D	L	GF	GA	GD	Pts	Qualification or relegation
1	Techno Sawang	2	1	1	0	3	2	+1	4	Group stage
2	Mahasarakham Rajabhat University	2	1	0	1	2	1	+1	3	
3	Khon Kaen Sambaithao	2	0	1	1	2	4	−2	1	

Updated to match(es) played on unknown. Source: []
Rules for classification: 1) points; 2) goal difference; 3) number of goals scored.
24 August 2019
16:00 (UTC+7)

Mahasarakham Rajabhat University	2–0	Khon Kaen Sam Baithao

College of Asian Scholars Stadium, Khon Kaen
28 August 2019
13:00 (UTC+7)

Techno Sawang	1–0	Mahasarakham Rajabhat University

Roi Et Stadium, Roi Et
1 September 2019
13:00

Khon Kaen Sambaithao	2–2	Techno Sawang

College of Asian Scholar Stadium, Khon Kaen

Group B1

Pos	Team	Pld	W	D	L	GF	GA	GD	Pts	Qualification or relegation
1	Chaiyaphum Changsuek	2	1	1	0	5	4	+1	4	Group stage
2	Sompho	2	1	0	1	4	3	+1	3	
3	Khonkaen Soccer Center	2	0	1	1	4	6	−2	1	

Updated to match(es) played on unknown. Source: []
Rules for classification: 1) points; 2) goal difference; 3) number of goals scored.
18 August 2019
13:00 (UTC+7)

Sompho	3–1	Khon Kaen Soccer Center United

Roi Et Stadium, Roi Et
24 August 2019
13:00 (UTC+7)

Khon Kaen Soccer Center United	3–3	Chaiyaphum Changsuek

Nongbua Pichaya Training Ground, Nong Bua Lamphu
31 August 2019
13:00 (UTC+7)

Chaiyaphum Changsuek	2–1	Sompho

Prasert Songkhram Barrack Football Field, Roi Et

Group B2

Pos	Team	Pld	W	D	L	GF	GA	GD	Pts	Qualification or relegation
1	College of Asian Scholars	2	2	0	0	11	1	+10	6	Group stage
2	Chantharubeksa	2	1	0	1	4	8	−4	3	
3	Laoporha	2	0	0	2	3	9	−6	0	

Updated to match(es) played on unknown. Source: []
Rules for classification: 1) points; 2) goal difference; 3) number of goals scored.
18 August 2019
16:00 (UTC+7)

Chantharubeksa	0–6	College of Asian Scholars

College of Asian Scholars Stadium, Khon Kaen
24 August 2019
13:00 (UTC+7)

Laoporha	2–4	Chantharubeksa

Loei Riverside Stadium, Loei
1 September 2019
16:00

College of Asian Scholars	5–1	Laoporha

College of Asian Scholars Stadium, Khon Kaen

Group B3

Pos	Team	Pld	W	D	L	GF	GA	GD	Pts	Qualification or relegation
1	Ban Chiang Peak-One City	2	0	2	0	2	2	0	2	Group stage
2	Kalasin Sauropod	2	0	2	0	1	1	0	2	
3	Muang Loei	2	0	2	0	1	1	0	2	

Updated to match(es) played on unknown. Source: []
Rules for classification: 1) points; 2) goal difference; 3) number of goals scored.
18 August 2019
16:00 (UTC+7)

Muang Loei	0–0	Kalasin Sauropod

Roi Et Stadium, Roi Et
24 August 2019
16:00 (UTC+7)

Kalasin Sauropod	1–1	Baan Chiang Peak One City

Roi Et Stadium, Roi Et
1 September 2019
13:00

Baan Chiang Peak One City	1–1	Muang Loei

Nongbua Pichaya F.C. Training Ground, Nong Bua Lamphu

Group B4

Pos	Team	Pld	W	D	L	GF	GA	GD	Pts	Qualification or relegation
1	Loei City	2	1	1	0	6	4	+2	4	Group stage
2	U.D. Nonghan	2	1	1	0	8	4	+4	4	
3	Nadoon	2	0	0	2	2	8	−6	0	

Updated to match(es) played on unknown. Source: []
Rules for classification: 1) points; 2) goal difference; 3) number of goals scored.
18 August 2019
16:00 (UTC+7)

UD Nonghan	3–3	Loei City

Nong Bua Pichaya Training Ground, Nong Bua Lamphu
24 August 2019
16:00 (UTC+7)

Loei City	3–1	Nadoon

Loei Riverside Stadium, Loei
1 September 2019
16:00

Nadoon	1–5	UD Nonghan

Nongbua Pichaya Training Ground, Nong Bua Lamphu

=== Group stage ===
Group A

Pos	Team	Pld	W	D	L	GF	GA	GD	Pts	Qualification or relegation
1	Kranuan	3	1	2	0	4	3	+1	5	Sub-regional final
2	Chumpae	3	1	2	0	1	0	+1	5	
3	Roi Et 2018	3	0	2	1	1	2	−1	2	
4	Techno Sawang	3	0	1	2	2	3	−1	1	

Updated to match(es) played on unknown. Source: []
Rules for classification: 1) points; 2) goal difference; 3) number of goals scored.
7 September 2019
13:00

Kranuan	3–2	Techno Sawang

Roi Et Rajabhat University Stadium, Roi Et
7 September 2019
16:00

Chumpae	1–0	Roi Et 2018

Roi Et Rajabhat University Stadium, Roi Et
15 September 2019
13:00

Roi Et 2018	1–1	Kranuan

Sawang Dandin Stadium, Sakon Nakhon
15 September 2019
16:00

Techno Sawang	0–0	Chumpae

Sawang Dandin Stadium, Sakon Nakhon
21 September 2019
13:00

Techno Sawang	0–0	Roi Et 2018

Nongbua Pichaya Training Ground, Nong Bua Lamphu
21 September 2019
13:00

Kranuan	0–0	Chumpae

College of Asian Scholars Stadium, Khon Kaen

Group B

Pos	Team	Pld	W	D	L	GF	GA	GD	Pts	Qualification or relegation
1	UD Nonghan	3	2	1	0	13	1	+12	7	Sub-regional final
2	College of Asian Scholars	3	1	2	0	9	3	+6	5	
3	Chaiyaphum Changsuek	3	1	0	2	3	17	−14	3	
4	Baan Chiang Peak One City	3	0	1	2	2	6	−4	1	

Updated to match(es) played on unknown. Source: []
Rules for classification: 1) points; 2) goal difference; 3) number of goals scored.
7 September 2019
13:00

Chaiyaphum Changsuek	1–7	College of Asian Scholars

Nongbua Pichaya F.C. Training Ground, Nong Bua Lamphu
7 September 2019
16:00

Baan Chiang Peak One City	0–3	UD Nonghan

Nongbua Pichaya F.C. Training Ground, Nong Bua Lamphu
15 September 2019
13:00

Chaiyaphum Changsuek	2–1	Baan Chiang Peak One City

College of Asian Scholars Stadium, Khon Kaen
15 September 2019
16:00

College of Asian Scholars	1–1	UD Nonghan

College of Asian Scholars Stadium, Khon Kaen
21 September 2019
16:00

UD Nonghan	9–0	Chaiyaphum Changsuek

Nongbua Pichaya Training Ground, Nong Bua Lamphu
21 September 2019
16:00

College of Asian Scholars	1–1	Baan Chiang Peak One City

College of Asian Scholars Stadium, Khon Kaen

== Lower northeastern subregion ==
=== Play-off round ===
17 August 2019
16:00 (UTC+7)
Play-off 1

Phukheao United	2–4	Nakhon Ratchasima Rajabhat University

Seekhorabhum Phisai School Football Pitch, Surin
17 August 2019
13:00 (UTC+7)
Play-off 2

Teeyai Yai Yam	3–1	Kantharalak United

Loeng Nok Tha District Office Stadium, Yasothon
17 August 2019
13:00 (UTC+7)
Play-off 3

Piya Pharmacy F.C.	2–1	Taa-ud United

Srinarong Stadium, Surin
18 August 2019
13:00 (UTC+7)
Play-off 4

Ubon Ratchathani Rajabhat University F.C.	5–2	Satuek F.C.

Ubon Ratchathani Rajabhat University Baan Yang Noi Campus Stadium, Ubon Ratchathani
18 August 2019
13:00 (UTC+7)
Play-off 5

Surindra	6–1	Suwannabhum United

Srinarong Stadium, Surin
18 August 2019
16:00 (UTC+7)
Play-off 6

Pathumrat United	2–2	Surin Sugar
Penalties
	4-3

Srinarong Stadium, Surin
17 August 2019
16:00 (UTC+7)
Play-off 7

Loengnoktha F.C.	1–1	Kadad City F.C.
Penalties
	4-5

Loeong Nok Tha District Office Stadium, Yasothon

=== Qualifying round ===
Group A1

Pos	Team	Pld	W	D	L	GF	GA	GD	Pts	Qualification or relegation
1	Sisaket Witthayalai School	2	1	1	0	9	1	+8	4	Group stage
2	Ubon Kids City	2	1	1	0	4	1	+3	4	
3	Putthaisong	2	0	0	2	0	11	−11	0	

Updated to match(es) played on unknown. Source: []
Rules for classification: 1) points; 2) goal difference; 3) number of goals scored.
17 August 2019
13:00 (UTC+7)

Phutthaisong	0–3	Ubon Kids City

Ubon Ratchathani Rajabhat University Baan Yang Noi Campus Stadium, Ubon Ratchathani
24 August 2019
13:00 (UTC+7)

Ubon Kids City	1–1	Sisaket Witthayalai School

Srinarong Stadium, Surin
31 August 2019
16:00 (UTC+7)

Sisaket Witthayalai School	8–0	Putthaisong

Ubon Ratchathani Rajabhat University Baan Yang Noi Campus Stadium, Ubon Ratchathani

Group A2

Pos	Team	Pld	W	D	L	GF	GA	GD	Pts	Qualification or relegation
1	Krua Napas Ubon	2	1	1	0	4	1	+3	4	Group stage
2	Nakhon Ratchasima Pro Kick United	2	0	2	0	5	5	0	2	
3	Soengsang United	2	0	1	1	4	7	−3	1	

Updated to match(es) played on unknown. Source: []
Rules for classification: 1) points; 2) goal difference; 3) number of goals scored.
17 August 2019
16:00 (UTC+7)

Krua Napas Ubon	3–0	Soengsang United

Ubon Ratchathani Rajabhat University Baan Yang Noi Campus Stadium, Ubon Ratchathani
24 August 2019
16:00 (UTC+7)

Krua Napas Ubon	1–1	Nakhon Ratchasima Pro Kick United

Ubon Ratchathani Rajabhat University Baan Yang Noi Campus Stadium, Ubon Ratchathani
31 August 2019
13:00 (UTC+7)

Nakhon Ratchasima Pro Kick United	4–4	Soengsang United

Ubon Ratchathani Rajabhat University Baan Yang Noi Campus Stadium, Ubon Ratchathani

Group A3

Pos	Team	Pld	W	D	L	GF	GA	GD	Pts	Qualification or relegation
1	Nakhon Ratchasima College	2	1	1	0	4	2	+2	4	Group stage
2	Seekhorabhum	2	0	2	0	4	4	0	2	
3	Nakhon Ratchasima Rajabhat University	2	0	1	1	2	4	−2	1	

Updated to match(es) played on unknown. Source: []
Rules for classification: 1) points; 2) goal difference; 3) number of goals scored.
17 August 2019
13:00 (UTC+7)

Nakhon Ratchasima College	2–2	Seekhorabhum

Seekhorabhum Phisai School Football Pitch, Surin
21 August 2019
16:00 (UTC+7)

Nakhon Ratchasima Rajabhat University	0–2	Nakhon Ratchasima College

Seekhorabhum Phisai School Football Field, Surin
25 August 2019
16:00 (UTC+7)

Seekhorabhum	2–2	Nakhon Ratchasima Rajabhat University

Ubon Ratchathani Rajabhat University Baan Yang Noi Campus Stadium, Ubon Ratchathani

Group A4

Pos	Team	Pld	W	D	L	GF	GA	GD	Pts	Qualification or relegation
1	Teeyai Yai Yam F.C.	2	2	0	0	5	1	+4	6	Group stage
2	Ubon Ratchathani Rajabhat University	2	1	0	1	4	2	+2	3	
3	Piya Pharmacy F.C.	2	0	0	2	0	6	−6	0	

Updated to match(es) played on unknown. Source: []
Rules for classification: 1) points; 2) goal difference; 3) number of goals scored.
21 August 2019
13:00 (UTC+7)

Teeyai Yai Yam F.C.	3–0	Piya Pharmacy

Seekhorabhum Phisai School Football Field, Surin
24 August 2019
13:00 (UTC+7)

Ubon Ratchathani Rajabhat University	3–0	Piya Pharmacy

Ubon Ratchathani Rajabhat University Baan Yang Noi Campus Stadium, Ubon Ratchathani
1 September 2019
13:00

Ubon Ratchathani Rajabhat University	1–2	Teeyai Yai Yam

Ubon Ratchathani Rajabhat University Baan Yang Noi Campus Stadium, Ubon Ratchathani

Group B1

Pos	Team	Pld	W	D	L	GF	GA	GD	Pts	Qualification or relegation
1	Suranaree Army 2	2	2	0	0	6	1	+5	6	Group stage
2	Kanthararom United	2	0	1	1	2	3	−1	1	
3	Sangsaeng F.C.	2	0	1	1	1	5	−4	1	

Updated to match(es) played on unknown. Source: []
Rules for classification: 1) points; 2) goal difference; 3) number of goals scored.
18 August 2019
16:00 (UTC+7)

Sangsaeng F.C.	0–4	Sura Naree Army 2 F.C.

Ubon Ratchathani Rajabhat University Baan Yang Noi Campus Stadium, Ubon Ratchathani
25 August 2019
13:00 (UTC+7)

Suranaree Army 2	2–1	Kanthararom United

Srinarong Stadium, Surin
1 September 2019
13:00

Kanthararom United	1–1	Sangsaeng F.C.

Rajamangala University of Technology Isan Surin Campus Stadium, Surin

Group B2

Pos	Team	Pld	W	D	L	GF	GA	GD	Pts	Qualification or relegation
1	Raseesalai United	2	2	0	0	5	1	+4	6	Group stage
2	Nakhon Ratchasima Municipality Sports School	2	1	0	1	6	6	0	3	
3	Amarin YMA United	2	0	0	2	3	7	−4	0	

Updated to match(es) played on unknown. Source: []
Rules for classification: 1) points; 2) goal difference; 3) number of goals scored.
17 August 2019
16:00 (UTC+7)

Amarin YMA United	0–2	Reseesalai United

Srinarong Stadium, Surin
25 August 2019
16:00 (UTC+7)

Nakhon Ratchasima Municipality Sports School	5–3	Amarin YMA United

Srinarong Stadium, Surin
31 August 2019
13:00 (UTC+7)

Raseesalai United	3–1	Nakhon Ratchasima Municipality Sports School

Rajamangala University of Technology Isan Surin Campus Stadium, Surin

Group B3

Pos	Team	Pld	W	D	L	GF	GA	GD	Pts	Qualification or relegation
1	Amnat Charoen Town	2	2	0	0	4	0	+4	6	Group stage
2	SA Sisaket	2	1	0	1	5	3	+2	3	
3	X-Star Khuangnai United	2	0	0	2	1	7	−6	0	

Updated to match(es) played on unknown. Source: []
Rules for classification: 1) points; 2) goal difference; 3) number of goals scored.
21 August 2019
13:00 (UTC+7)

SA Sisaket	5–1	X-Star Khuangnai United

Loeng Nok Tha District Office Stadium, Yasothon
25 August 2019
13:00 (UTC+7)

X-Star Khuangnai United	0–2	Amnat Charoen Town

Ubon Ratchathani Rajabhat University Baan Yang Noi Campus Stadium, Ubon Ratchathani
1 September 2019
16:00

Amnat Charoen Town	2–0	SA Sisaket

Ubon Ratchathani Rajabhat University Baan Yang Noi Campus Stadium, Ubon Ratchathani

Group B4

Pos	Team	Pld	W	D	L	GF	GA	GD	Pts	Qualification or relegation
1	Surindra F.C.	2	2	0	0	10	0	+10	6	Group stage
2	Kadad City	2	1	0	1	9	4	+5	3	
3	Pathumrat United	2	0	0	2	0	15	−15	0	

Updated to match(es) played on unknown. Source: []
Rules for classification: 1) points; 2) goal difference; 3) number of goals scored.
21 August 2019
16:00 (UTC+7)

Kadad City	0–4	Surindra

Loeng Nok Tha District Office Stadium, Yasothon
24 August 2019
16:00 (UTC+7)

Pathumrat United	0–6	Surindra

Srinarong Stadium, Surin
31 August 2019
16:00 (UTC+7)

Kadad City	9–0	Pathumrat United

Rajamangala University of Technology Isan Surin Campus Stadium, Surin

=== Group stage ===
Group A

Pos	Team	Pld	W	D	L	GF	GA	GD	Pts	Qualification or relegation
1	Krua Napas Ubon	3	1	2	0	6	2	+4	5	Sub-regional final
2	Nakhon Ratchasima College	3	1	2	0	4	3	+1	5	
3	Sisaket Witthayalai School	3	1	1	1	5	4	+1	4	
4	Teeyai Yai Yam	3	0	1	2	2	8	−6	1	

Updated to match(es) played on unknown. Source: []
Rules for classification: 1) points; 2) goal difference; 3) number of goals scored.
7 September 2019
13:00

Sisaket Witthayalai School	1–1	Krua Napas Ubon

Ubon Ratchathani University Stadium, Ubon Ratchathani
7 September 2019
16:00

Nakhon Ratchasima College	1–1	Teeyai Yai Yam

Ubon Ratchathani University Stadium, Ubon Ratchathani
15 September 2019
13:00

Teeyai Yai Yam	1–3	Sisaket Witthayalai School

Ubon Ratchathani Sports School Stadium, Ubon Ratchathani
15 September 2019
16:00

Krua Napas Ubon	1–1	Nakhon Ratchasima College

Ubon Ratchathani Sports School Stadium, Ubon Ratchathani
22 September 2019
13:00

Krua Napas Ubon	4–0	Teeyai Yai Yam

Ubon Ratchathani Sports School Stadium, Ubon Ratchathani
21 September 2019
13:00

Nakhon Ratchasima College	2–1	Sisaket Witthayalai School

Rajamangala University of Technology Isan Surin Campus Stadium, Surin

Group B

Pos	Team	Pld	W	D	L	GF	GA	GD	Pts	Qualification or relegation
1	Suranaree Army II	3	2	1	0	7	1	+6	7	Sub-regional final
2	Surindra	3	2	0	1	12	3	+9	6	
3	Amnat Charoen Town	3	1	1	1	5	9	−4	4	
4	Raseesalai United	3	0	0	3	4	15	−11	0	

Updated to match(es) played on unknown. Source: []
Rules for classification: 1) points; 2) goal difference; 3) number of goals scored.
7 September 2019
13:00

Suranaree Army II	5–1	Raseesalai United

Rajamangala University of Technology Isan Surin Campus Stadium, Surin
7 September 2019
16:00

Amnat Charoen Town	0–7	Surindra

Rajamangala University of Technology Isan Surin Campus Stadium, Surin
15 September 2019
13:00

Surindra	0–2	Suranaree Army II

Rajamangala University of Technology Isan Surin Campus Stadium, Surin
15 September 2019
16:00

Reseesalai United	2–5	Amnat Charoen Town

Rajamangala University of Technology Isan Surin Campus Stadium, Surin
21 September 2019
16:00

Amnat Charoen Town	0–0	Suranaree Army II

Ubon Ratchathani Sports School Stadium, Ubon Ratchathani
21 September 2019
16:00

Surindra	5–1	Raseesalai United

Rajamangala University of Technology Isan Surin Campus Stadium, Surin

== Upper eastern subregion ==
=== Qualifying round ===
Group A1

Pos	Team	Pld	W	D	L	GF	GA	GD	Pts	Qualification or relegation
1	Prachinburi City	2	2	0	0	9	0	+9	6	Group stage
2	Sakultala	2	1	0	1	4	6	−2	3	Group stage
3	Bang Kapi Leong S.C.	2	0	0	2	2	9	−7	0	

Updated to match(es) played on unknown. Source: []
Rules for classification: 1) points; 2) goal difference; 3) number of goals scored.
18 August 2019
13:00 (UTC+7)

Sakultala	4–2	Bang Kapi Leong Spirit Sport

Sakaeo F.C. Training Ground, Sa Kaeo
24 August 2019
16:00 (UTC+7)

Bang Kapi Leong Spirit Sport	0–5	Prachinburi City

Prachinburi Stadium, Prachinburi
1 September 2019
16:00

Prachinburi City	4–0	Sakultala

Prachinburi Stadium, Prachinburi

Group A2

Pos	Team	Pld	W	D	L	GF	GA	GD	Pts	Qualification or relegation
1	Real Oldman	2	1	0	1	3	3	0	3	Group stage
2	Pad-riou United	2	1	0	1	2	2	0	3	Group stage
3	Sueayai Look Phor Khun	2	1	0	1	2	2	0	3	

Updated to match(es) played on unknown. Source: []
Rules for classification: 1) points; 2) goal difference; 3) number of goals scored.
18 August 2019
16:00 (UTC+7)

Pad-riou United	0–1	Suea Yai Look Phor Khun

Sakaeo F.C. Training Ground, Sa Kaeo
24 August 2019
13:00 (UTC+7)

Suea Yai Look Phor Khun	1–2	Real Oldman

Prachinburi Stadium, Prachinburi
1 September 2019
13:00

Real Oldman	1–2	Pad-riou United

Prachinburi Stadium, Prachinburi

Group B1

Pos	Team	Pld	W	D	L	GF	GA	GD	Pts	Qualification or relegation
1	Wangpailom Sport Club	2	1	1	0	2	1	+1	4	Group stage
2	Ang Sila	2	1	0	1	4	2	+2	3	Group stage
3	Buakaw	2	0	1	1	0	3	−3	1	

Updated to match(es) played on unknown. Source: []
Rules for classification: 1) points; 2) goal difference; 3) number of goals scored.
18 August 2019
13:00 (UTC+7)

Wangphailom Sports Club	0–0	Buakaw

Nakhon Nayok Stadium, Nakhon Nayok
24 August 2019
16:00 (UTC+7)

Buakaw	0–3	Ang Sila

Sakaeo F.C. Training Ground, Sa Kaeo
1 September 2019
13:00

Ang Sila	1–2	Wang Phailom Sports Club

Nakhon Nayok Stadium, Nakhon Nayok

Group B2

Pos	Team	Pld	W	D	L	GF	GA	GD	Pts	Qualification or relegation
1	Nakhon Nayok F.C.	2	1	1	0	4	2	+2	4	Group stage
2	Hi-Tech College Sa Kaeo	2	0	2	0	2	2	0	2	Group stage
3	Singh Ubon F.C.	2	0	1	1	0	2	−2	1	

Updated to match(es) played on unknown. Source: []
Rules for classification: 1) points; 2) goal difference; 3) number of goals scored.
18 August 2019
16:00 (UTC+7)

Nakhon Nayok F.C.	2–0	Singh Ubon

Nakhon Nayok Stadium, Nakhon Nayok
24 August 2019
13:00 (UTC+7)

Singh Ubon	0–0	Hi-Tech College Sa Kaeo

Sakaeo F.C. Training Ground, Sa Kaeo
1 September 2019
16:00

Hitech College Sa Kaeo	2–2	Nakhon Nayok

Nakhon Nayok Stadium, Nakhon Nayok

=== Group stage ===
Group A

Pos	Team	Pld	W	D	L	GF	GA	GD	Pts	Qualification or relegation
1	Prachinburi City	3	3	0	0	11	0	+11	9	Sub-regional final
2	Pad-riou United	3	1	0	2	5	4	+1	3	
3	Real Oldman	2	1	0	1	1	4	−3	3	
4	Sakultala	2	0	0	2	2	11	−9	0	

Updated to match(es) played on unknown. Source: []
Rules for classification: 1) points; 2) goal difference; 3) number of goals scored.
8 September 2019
13:00

Real Oldman	1–0	Pad-riou United

Prachinburi Stadium, Prachinburi
8 September 2019
16:00

Sakultala	0–6	Prachinburi City

Prachinburi Stadium, Prachinburi
14 September 2019
13:00

Prachinburi City	4–0	Real Oldman

Prachinburi Stadium, Prachinburi
14 September 2019
16:00

Pad-riou United	5–2	Sakultala

Prachinburi Stadium, Prachinburi
21 September 2019
13:00

Real Oldman	×–×	Sakultala
Penalties
	Match abandoned

Nakhon Nayok Stadium, Nakhon Nayok
21 September 2019
13:00

Pad-riou United	0–1	Prachinburi City

Prachinburi Stadium, Prachinburi

Group B

Pos	Team	Pld	W	D	L	GF	GA	GD	Pts	Qualification or relegation
1	Nakhon Nayok F.C.	3	3	0	0	9	0	+9	9	Sub-regional final
2	Wangphailom Sports Club	3	1	1	1	5	3	+2	4	
3	Hi-Tech College Sa Kaeo	3	1	1	1	3	3	0	4	
4	Ang Sila	3	0	0	3	1	12	−11	0	

Updated to match(es) played on unknown. Source: []
Rules for classification: 1) points; 2) goal difference; 3) number of goals scored.
8 September 2019
13:00

Wangphailom Sports Club	5–0	Ang Sila

Nakhon Nayok Stadium, Nakhon Nayok
8 September 2019
16:00

Nakhon Nayok	2–0	Hi-Tech College Sa Kaeo

Nakhon Nayok Stadium, Nakhon Nayok
14 September 2019
13:00

Hi-Tech College Sa Kaeo	0–0	Wangphailom Sports Club

Nakhon Nayok Stadium, Nakhon Nayok
14 September 2019
16:00

Ang Sila	0–4	Nakhon Nayok

Nakhon Nayok Stadium, Nakhon Nayok
21 September 2019
16:00

Nakhon Nayok	3–0	Wangphailom Sports Club

Nakhon Nayok Stadium, Nakhon Nayok
21 September 2019
16:00

Ang Sila	1–3	Hi-Tech College Sa Kaeo

Prachinburi Stadium, Prachinburi

== Lower eastern subregion ==
=== Qualification round ===
Group A1

Pos	Team	Pld	W	D	L	GF	GA	GD	Pts	Qualification or relegation
1	Patthana F.C.	2	2	0	0	11	0	+11	6	Group stage
2	Assumption University	2	1	0	1	2	8	−6	3	
3	Cilie F.C.	2	0	0	2	1	6	−5	0	

Updated to match(es) played on unknown. Source: []
Rules for classification: 1) points; 2) goal difference; 3) number of goals scored.
17 August 2019
13:00 (UTC+7:00)

Patthana F.C.	7–0	Assumption University

Pattaya City Youth Sports Center, Chonburi
25 August 2019
13:00 (UTC+7)

Assumption University	2–1	Cilie Sports Club

Royal Thai Fleet Training Ground, Chonburi
31 August 2019
13:00 (UTC+7)

Cilie Sports Club	0–4	Patthana F.C.

Pattaya City Youth Sports Center, Chonburi

Group A2

Pos	Team	Pld	W	D	L	GF	GA	GD	Pts	Qualification or relegation
1	Muang Pattaya	2	2	0	0	7	2	+5	6	Group stage
2	Maptaphut est. 2016	2	1	0	1	2	4	−2	3	Group stage
3	Klong Yai	2	0	0	2	1	4	−3	0	

Updated to match(es) played on unknown. Source: []
Rules for classification: 1) points; 2) goal difference; 3) number of goals scored.
17 August 2019
16:00 (UTC+7)

Muang Pattaya	4–1	Maptaphut est. 2016

Pattaya City Youth Sports Center, Chonburi
25 August 2019
16:00 (UTC+7)

Maptaphut est. 2016	1–0	Klong Yai

Royal Thai Fleet Training Ground, Chonburi
31 August 2019
16:00 (UTC+7)

Klong Yai	1–3	Muang Pattaya

Pattaya City Youth Sports Center, Chonburi

Group B1

Pos	Team	Pld	W	D	L	GF	GA	GD	Pts	Qualification or relegation
1	Baan Kaeng United	2	2	0	0	4	1	+3	6	Group stage
2	Pattaya Dolphins United	2	1	0	1	5	3	+2	3	Group stage
3	Burapha University	2	0	0	2	2	7	−5	0	

Updated to match(es) played on unknown. Source: []
Rules for classification: 1) points; 2) goal difference; 3) number of goals scored.
17 August 2019
16:00 (UTC+7)

Burapha University	1–5	Pattaya Dolphins United

Nong Prue Municipality Stadium, Chonburi
25 August 2019
13:00 (UTC+7)

Pattaya Dolphins United	0–2	Baan Kaeng United

Nong Prue Municipality Stadium, Chonburi
31 August 2019
13:00 (UTC+7)

Baan Kaeng United	2–1	Burapha University

Royal Thai Fleet Training Ground, Chonburi

Group B2

Pos	Team	Pld	W	D	L	GF	GA	GD	Pts	Qualification or relegation
1	ACDC	2	2	0	0	5	2	+3	6	Group stage
2	Khao Baisri Municipality	2	1	0	1	6	5	+1	3	Group stage
3	Plutaluang Witthaya	2	0	0	2	2	6	−4	0	

Updated to match(es) played on unknown. Source: []
Rules for classification: 1) points; 2) goal difference; 3) number of goals scored.
17 August 2019
13:00 (UTC+7)

Plutaluang Witthaya	2–4	Khao Baisri Municipality

Nong Prue Municipality Stadium, Chonburi
25 August 2019
16:00 (UTC+7)

Khao Baisri Municipality	2–3	ACDC

Nong Prue Municipality Stadium, Chonburi
31 August 2019
16:00 (UTC+7)

ACDC	2–0	Plutaluang Witthaya

Royal Thai Fleet Training Ground, Chonburi

=== Group stage ===
Group A

Pos	Team	Pld	W	D	L	GF	GA	GD	Pts	Qualification or relegation
1	Muang Pattaya F.C.	3	3	0	0	11	3	+8	9	Sub-regional final
2	Patthana F.C.	3	1	1	1	11	3	+8	4	
3	Nikom Rovers	3	1	1	1	4	6	−2	4	
4	Maptaphut est. 2018	3	0	0	3	4	20	−16	0	

Updated to match(es) played on unknown. Source: []
Rules for classification: 1) points; 2) goal difference; 3) number of goals scored.
7 September 2019
13:00

Nikom Rovers	0–0	Patthana F.C.

Pattaya City Youth Sports Center, Chonburi
7 September 2019
16:00

Muang Pattaya F.C.	6–1	Maptaphut Est. 2016

Pattaya City Youth Sports Center, Chonburi
15 September 2019
13:00

Maptaphut Est. 2016	2–4	Nikom Rovers

Nongprue Municipality Stadium, Chonburi
15 September 2019
16:00

Patthana F.C.	1–2	Muang Pattaya F.C.

Nongprue Municipality Stadium, Chonburi
21 September 2019
13:00

Maptaphut Est. 2016	1–10	Patthana F.C.

Nongprue Municipality Stadium, Chonburi
21 September 2019
13:00

Muang Pattaya F.C.	4–0	Nikom Rovers

Nongprue Municipality Stadium Pitch 2, Chonburi

Group B

Pos	Team	Pld	W	D	L	GF	GA	GD	Pts	Qualification or relegation
1	ACDC	3	2	1	0	13	5	+8	7	Sub-regional final
2	Baan Kaeng United	3	2	1	0	10	3	+7	7	
3	Khao Baisri Municipality	3	1	0	2	7	12	−5	3	
4	Pattaya Dolphin United	3	0	0	3	5	13	−8	0	

Updated to match(es) played on unknown. Source: []
Rules for classification: 1) points; 2) goal difference; 3) number of goals scored.
8 September 2019
13:00

ACDC	4–2	Khao Baisri Municipality

Nongprue Municipality Stadium, Chonburi
8 September 2019
16:00

Pattaya Dolphin United	1–2	Baan Kaeng United

Nongprue Municipality Stadium, Chonburi
14 September 2019
13:00

Khao Baisri Municipality	3–4	Pattaya Dolphin United

Nongprue Municipality Stadium, Chonburi
14 September 2019
16:00

Baan Kaeng United	2–2	ACDC

Nongprue Municipality Stadium, Chonburi
21 September 2019
16:00

Pattaya Dolphin United	1–7	ACDC

Nongprue Municipality Stadium, Chonburi
21 September 2019
16:00

Khao Baisri Municipality	0–6	Baan Kaeng United

Nongprue Municipality Stadium Pitch 2, Chonburi

== Bangkok Metro ==
=== Play-off round ===
17 August 2019
13:00 (UTC+7)
Play-off 1

Bangkok Thonburi F.C.	5–3	KT Bull Sam Wa United

King Mongkut's University of Technology North Bangkok Football Field, Bangkok
18 August 2019
13:00 (UTC+7)
Play-off 2

Thamrongthai F.C.	1–2	Egypt-Thai F.C.

King Mongkut's University of Technology North Bangkok Football Field, Bangkok
18 August 2019
16:00 (UTC+7)
Play-off 3

Baan Nok Khamin Foundation	1–2	Bangna United

King Mongkut's University of Technology North Bangkok Football Field, Bangkok
21 August 2019
16:00 (UTC+7)
Play-off 4

Royal Thai Air Force	9–0	Immanuel Sports Center

Thupatemi Stadium, Pathum Thani
21 August 2019
13:00 (UTC+7)
Play-off 5

Thonburi S.C.	1–2	Air Sergeant F.C.

Thupatemi Stadium, Pathum Thani

=== Qualifying round ===
Group A1

Pos	Team	Pld	W	D	L	GF	GA	GD	Pts	Qualification or relegation
1	KMUTNB	2	2	0	0	8	3	+5	6	Group stage
2	Suea Na Ngoen F.C.	2	0	1	1	2	4	−2	1	
3	Lumpinee F.C.	2	0	1	1	3	6	−3	1	

Updated to match(es) played on unknown. Source: []
Rules for classification: 1) points; 2) goal difference; 3) number of goals scored.
17 August 2019
16:00 (UTC+7)

KMUTNB	3–1	Suea Na Ngoen

King Mongkut's University of Technology North Bangkok Football Field, Bangkok
28 August 2019
16:00 (UTC+7)

KMUTNB	5–2	Lumpinee

King Mongkut's University of Technology North Bangkok Football Field, Bangkok
31 August 2019
16:00

Lumpinee	1–1	Suea Na Ngoen

Rangsit University Stadium, Pathum Thani

Group A2

Pos	Team	Pld	W	D	L	GF	GA	GD	Pts	Qualification or relegation
1	Phimai United	2	2	0	0	7	0	+7	6	Group stage
2	APD United	2	1	0	1	1	4	−3	3	
3	Rajdamneon Commercial College	2	0	0	2	0	4	−4	0	

Updated to match(es) played on unknown. Source: []
Rules for classification: 1) points; 2) goal difference; 3) number of goals scored.
21 August 2019
13:00 (UTC+7)

Phimai United	3–0	Rajdamnoen Commercial College

King Mongkut's University of Technology North Bangkok Football Field, Bangkok
28 August 2019
13:00 (UTC+7)

Rajdamneon Commercial College	0–1	APD United

Bangkok University Rangsit Campus Stadium, Pathum Thani
31 August 2019
13:00

APD United	0–4	Phimai United

Rangsit University Stadium, Pathum Thani

Group A3

Pos	Team	Pld	W	D	L	GF	GA	GD	Pts	Qualification or relegation
1	Bangkok-Thonburi	2	2	0	0	5	1	+4	6	Group stage
2	Dome F.C.	2	1	0	1	9	2	+7	3	
3	Royal Thai Air Force Academy	2	0	0	2	0	11	−11	0	

Updated to match(es) played on unknown. Source: []
Rules for classification: 1) points; 2) goal difference; 3) number of goals scored.
25 August 2019
13:00 (UTC+7)

Dome F.C.	8–0	Royal Thai Air Force Academy

Kasem Bundit University Romklao Campus Stadium, Bangkok
28 August 2019
16:00 (UTC+7)

Bangkok-Thonburi	2–1	Dome F.C.

Bangkok University Rangsit Campus Stadium, Pathum Thani
31 August 2019
16:00

Royal Thai Air Force Academy	0–3	Bangkok-Thonburi

Thupatemi Stadium, Pathum Thani

Group A4

Pos	Team	Pld	W	D	L	GF	GA	GD	Pts	Qualification or relegation
1	Royal Thai Air Force	2	1	1	0	15	0	+15	4	Group stage
2	Egypt-Thai F.C.	2	1	1	0	12	0	+12	4	
3	Bang Na United	2	0	0	2	0	27	−27	0	

Updated to match(es) played on unknown. Source: []
Rules for classification: 1) points; 2) goal difference; 3) number of goals scored.
25 August 2019
16:00 (UTC+7)

Egypt-Thai	12–0	Bang Na United

Kasem Bundit University Romklao Campus Stadium, Bangkok
28 August 2019
16:00 (UTC+7)

Royal Thai Air Force	0–0	Egypt-Thai

Thupatemi Stadium, Pathum Thani
1 September 2019
16:00

Royal Thai Air Force	15–0	Bang Na United

Thupatemi Stadium, Pathum Thani

Group B1

Pos	Team	Pld	W	D	L	GF	GA	GD	Pts	Qualification or relegation
1	Hippo F.C.	2	2	0	0	5	0	+5	6	Group stage
2	Muang Krung F.C.	2	1	0	1	1	1	0	3	
3	PTS Pathum Thani City	2	0	0	2	0	5	−5	0	

Updated to match(es) played on unknown. Source: []
Rules for classification: 1) points; 2) goal difference; 3) number of goals scored.
21 August 2019
16:00 (UTC+7)

PTS Pathum Thani City	0–4	Hippo F.C.

King Mongkut's University of Technology North Bangkok Football Field, Bangkok
28 August 2019
13:00 (UTC+7)

Hippo F.C.	1–0	Muang Krung

King Mongkut's University of Technology North Bangkok Football Field, Bangkok
1 September 2019
13:00

Muang Krung	1–0	PTS Pathum Thani City

Rangsit University Stadium, Pathum Thani

Group B2

Pos	Team	Pld	W	D	L	GF	GA	GD	Pts	Qualification or relegation
1	BCC F.C.	2	1	1	0	4	2	+2	4	Group stage
2	Nongchok United	2	1	1	0	4	3	+1	4	
3	Thai Spirit F.C.	2	0	0	2	3	6	−3	0	

Updated to match(es) played on unknown. Source: []
Rules for classification: 1) points; 2) goal difference; 3) number of goals scored.
21 August 2019
13:00 (UTC+7)

Nongchok United	3–2	Thai Spirit F.C.

Bangkok University Rangsit Campus Stadium, Pathum Thani
28 August 2019
13:00 (UTC+7)

BCC F.C.	1–1	Nongchok United

Thupatemi Stadium, Pathum Thani
1 September 2019
16:00

Thai Spirit	1–3	BCC F.C.

Rangsit University Stadium, Pathum Thani

Group B3

Pos	Team	Pld	W	D	L	GF	GA	GD	Pts	Qualification or relegation
1	Phoenix F.C.	1	1	0	0	2	0	+2	3	Group stage
2	Ocel Media	1	0	0	1	0	2	−2	0	
3	Royal Thai Armed Force Headquarters*	0	0	0	0	0	0	0	0	Withdrawn

Updated to match(es) played on unknown. Source: []
Rules for classification: 1) points; 2) goal difference; 3) number of goals scored.
25 August 2019
16:00 (UTC+7)

Ocel Media	0–2	Phoenix

King Mongkut's University of Technology North Bangkok Football Field, Bangkok

* Royal Thai Army Headquarters withdraws, so all match which involves Royal Thai Army Headquarters is cancelled, and Phoenix F.C. qualified to the next round.

Group B4

Pos	Team	Pld	W	D	L	GF	GA	GD	Pts	Qualification or relegation
1	Don Muang Metropolitan Police Station	2	1	1	0	6	3	+3	4	Group stage
2	Air Force Sergeant	2	1	0	1	4	5	−1	3	
3	Ladkrabang United	2	0	1	1	3	5	−2	1	

Updated to match(es) played on unknown. Source: []
Rules for classification: 1) points; 2) goal difference; 3) number of goals scored.
21 August 2019
16:00 (UTC+7)

Ladkrabang United	2–2	Don Muang Metropolitan Police Station

Bangkok University Rangsit Campus Stadium, Pathum Thani
25 August 2019
13:00 (UTC+7)

Air Force Sergeant	3–1	Lad Krabang United

King Mongkut's University of Technology North Bangkok Football Field, Bangkok
1 September 2019
13:00

Air Force Sergeant	1–4	Don Muang Metropolitan Police Station

Thupatemi Stadium, Pathum Thani

=== Group stage ===
Group A

Pos	Team	Pld	W	D	L	GF	GA	GD	Pts	Qualification or relegation
1	Royal Thai Air Force	3	3	0	0	9	5	+4	9	Sub-regional final
2	Bangkok Thonburi	3	2	0	1	7	4	+3	6	
3	Phimai United	3	1	0	2	4	6	−2	3	
4	KMUTNB	3	0	0	3	4	9	−5	0	

Updated to match(es) played on unknown. Source: []
Rules for classification: 1) points; 2) goal difference; 3) number of goals scored.
8 September 2019
13:00

Royal Thai Air Force	3–1	Bangkok Thonburi

King Mongkut's University of Technology North Bangkok Football Field, Bangkok
8 September 2019
16:00

KMUTNB	1–2	Phimai United

King Mongkut's University of Technology North Bangkok Football Field, Bangkok
14 September 2019
13:00

Bangkok Thonburi	2–0	Phimai United

Thupatemee Stadium, Pathum Thani
14 September 2019
16:00

Royal Thai Air Force	3–2	KMUTNB

Thupatemee Stadium, Pathum Thani
21 September 2019
16:00

KMUTNB	1–4	Bangkok Thonburi

King Mongkut's University of Technology North Bangkok Football Field, Bangkok
21 September 2019
16:00

Phimai United	2–3	Royal Thai Air Force

Thupatemee Stadium, Pathum Thani

Group B

Pos	Team	Pld	W	D	L	GF	GA	GD	Pts	Qualification or relegation
1	Phoenix F.C.	3	1	2	0	8	4	+4	5	Sub-regional final
2	Hippo F.C.	3	1	2	0	5	2	+3	5	
3	Don Muang Metropolitan Police Station	3	1	2	0	7	5	+2	5	
4	BCC F.C.	3	0	0	3	1	10	−9	0	

Updated to match(es) played on unknown. Source: []
Rules for classification: 1) points; 2) goal difference; 3) number of goals scored.
8 September 2019
13:00

Hippo F.C.	3–0	BCC F.C.

Bangkok University Rangsit Campus Stadium, Pathum Thani
8 September 2019
16:00

Phoenix F.C.	3–3	Don Muang Metropolitan Police Station

Bangkok University Rangsit Campus Stadium, Pathum Thani
15 September 2019
13:00

Don Muang Metropolitan Police Station	0–0	Hippo F.C.

King Mongkut's University of Technology North Bangkok Football Field, Bangkok
15 September 2019
16:00

BCC F.C.	0–2	Phoenix F.C.

King Mongkut's University of Technology North Bangkok Football Field, Bangkok
21 September 2019
13:00

Hippo F.C.	2–2	Phoenix F.C.

King Mongkut's University of Technology North Bangkok Football Field, Bangkok
21 September 2019
13:00

Don Muang Metropolitan Police Station	5–1	BCC F.C.

Thupatemee Stadium, Pathum Thani

== Perimeter region ==
=== Qualification stage ===
Group A1

Pos	Team	Pld	W	D	L	GF	GA	GD	Pts	Qualification or relegation
1	Rose Asia	2	1	1	0	5	1	+4	4	Group stage
2	Nongchok City	2	1	1	0	1	0	+1	4	Group stage
3	Bisita Ayothaya	2	0	0	2	1	6	−5	0	

Updated to match(es) played on unknown. Source: []
Rules for classification: 1) points; 2) goal difference; 3) number of goals scored.
17 August 2019
13:00 (UTC+7)

Rose Asia	5–1	Bisita Ayothaya

Bangkok University Rangsit Campus Stadium, Pathum Thani
24 August 2019
16:00 (UTC+7)

Bisita Ayothaya	0–1	Nongchok City

Bangkok University Rangsit Campus Stadium, Pathum Thani
28 August 2019
13:00 (UTC+7)

Nongchok City	0–0	Rose Asia

Kasem Bundit University Romklao Campus Stadium, Bangkok

Group A2

Pos	Team	Pld	W	D	L	GF	GA	GD	Pts	Qualification or relegation
1	Romklao United	2	2	0	0	7	0	+7	6	Group stage
2	Bang Khun Tian United	2	1	0	1	2	3	−1	3	
3	Sirisak Sports Club	2	0	0	2	0	6	−6	0	

Updated to match(es) played on unknown. Source: []
Rules for classification: 1) points; 2) goal difference; 3) number of goals scored.
17 August 2019
16:00 (UTC+7)

Bang Khun Tian United	2–0	Sirisak Sports Club

Bangkok University Rangsit Campus Stadium, Pathum Thani
24 August 2019
16:00 (UTC+7)

Romklao United	4–0	Sirisak Sports Club

Kasem Bundit University Romklao Campus Stadium, Bangkok
28 August 2019
16:00 (UTC+7)

Romklao United	3–0	Bang Khun Tian United

Kasem Bundit University Romklao Campus Stadium, Bangkok

Group A3

Pos	Team	Pld	W	D	L	GF	GA	GD	Pts	Qualification or relegation
1	Chenarreeorca	0	0	0	0	0	0	0	0	Group stage
2	Mahidol University Sport sciences	0	0	0	0	0	0	0	0	
3	PFC Thonburi Robot	0	0	0	0	0	0	0	0	

Updated to match(es) played on unknown. Source: []
Rules for classification: 1) points; 2) goal difference; 3) number of goals scored.
18 August 2019
13:00 (UTC+7)

Chenarreeorca	1–0	Mahidol University

Kasem Bundit University Romklao Campus Stadium, Bangkok
24 August 2019
13:00 (UTC+7)

Mahidol University	5–0	PFC Thonburi Robot

Bangkok University Rangsit Campus Stadium, Pathum Thani
1 September 2019
13:00

PFC Thonburi Robot	1–4	Chenarreeorca

Gracku Saimai United Training Ground, Bangkok

Group B1

Pos	Team	Pld	W	D	L	GF	GA	GD	Pts	Qualification or relegation
1	Bang Mod F.C.	2	1	1	0	2	1	+1	4	Group stage
2	Samut Prakan United F.C.	2	1	0	1	3	3	0	3	
3	Dontan PCCM F.C.	2	0	1	1	1	2	−1	1	

Updated to match(es) played on unknown. Source: []
Rules for classification: 1) points; 2) goal difference; 3) number of goals scored.
18 August 2019
16:00 (UTC+7)

Dontan PCCM	0–0	Bang Mod

Kasem Bundit University Romklao Campus Stadium, Bangkok
25 August 2019
13:00 (UTC+7)

Samut Prakan United	2–1	Dontan PCCM

Bangkok University Rangsit Campus Stadium, Pathum Thani
1 September 2019
16:00

Samut Prakan United	1–2	Bang Mod

Gracku Saimai United Training Ground, Bangkok

Group B2

Pos	Team	Pld	W	D	L	GF	GA	GD	Pts	Qualification or relegation
1	Aidin F.C.	2	1	1	0	6	4	+2	4	Group stage
2	Bangkok City F.C.	2	0	2	0	4	4	0	2	
3	Thonburi City F.C.	2	0	1	1	4	6	−2	1	

Updated to match(es) played on unknown. Source: []
Rules for classification: 1) points; 2) goal difference; 3) number of goals scored.
18 August 2019
13:00 (UTC+7)

Aidin Sport Thailand	4–2	Thonburi City

Bangkok University Rangsit Campus Stadium, Pathum Thani
25 August 2019
16:00 (UTC+7)

Thonburi City	2–2	Bangkok City

Bangkok University Rangsit Campus Stadium, Pathum Thani
1 September 2019
13:00

Bangkok City	2–2	Aidin Sports Thailand

Bangkok University Rangsit Campus Stadium, Pathum Thani

Group B3

Pos	Team	Pld	W	D	L	GF	GA	GD	Pts	Qualification or relegation
1	Rajapruk University F.C.	2	2	0	0	5	0	+5	6	Group stage
2	Nongkae Municipality	2	1	0	1	7	2	+5	3	Group stage
3	Suan Kularb Witthayalai Rangsit United	2	0	0	2	1	11	−10	0	

Updated to match(es) played on unknown. Source: []
Rules for classification: 1) points; 2) goal difference; 3) number of goals scored.
18 August 2019
16:00 (UTC+7)

Nongkae Municipality	0–1	Rajapruk University

Bangkok University Rangsit Campus Stadium, Pathum Thani
24 August 2019
13:00 (UTC+7)

Suan Kularb Witthayalai Rangsit United	0–4	Rajapruk University

Kasem Bundit University Romklao Campus Stadium, Bangkok
1 September 2019
16:00

Nongkae Municipality	7–1	Suan Kularb Witthayalai Rangsit United

Bangkok University Rangsit Campus Stadium, Pathum Thani

=== Group stage ===
Group A

Pos	Team	Pld	W	D	L	GF	GA	GD	Pts	Qualification or relegation
1	Romklao United	3	2	1	0	7	5	+2	7	Sub-regional final
2	Nongchok City	3	1	2	0	4	2	+2	5	
3	Chenarreeorca	3	1	1	1	6	4	+2	4	
4	Rose Asia	3	0	0	3	4	10	−6	0	

Updated to match(es) played on unknown. Source: []
Rules for classification: 1) points; 2) goal difference; 3) number of goals scored.
8 September 2019
13:00

Chenarreeorca	1–1	Nongchok City

Kasem Bundit University Romklao Campus Stadium, Bangkok
8 September 2019
16:00

Rose Asia	3–4	Romklao United

Kasem Bundit University Romklao Campus Stadium, Bangkok
14 September 2019
13:00

Romklao United	3–2	Chenarreeorca

Bangkok University Rangsit Campus Stadium, Pathum Thani
14 September 2019
16:00

Nongchok City	3–1	Rose Asia

Bangkok University Rangsit Campus Stadium, Pathum Thani
21 September 2019
16:00

Chenarreeorca	3–0	Rose Asia

Bangkok University Rangsit Campus Stadium, Pathum Thani
21 September 2019
16:00

Romklao United	0–0	Nongchok City

Kasem Bundit University Romklao Campus Stadium, Bangkok

Group B

Pos	Team	Pld	W	D	L	GF	GA	GD	Pts	Qualification or relegation
1	Aidin Sports Thailand	3	3	0	0	9	2	+7	9	Sub-regional final
2	Rajapruk University	3	2	0	1	7	5	+2	6	
3	Nongkae Municipality	3	1	0	2	4	9	−5	3	
4	Bang Mod	3	0	0	3	3	10	−7	0	

Updated to match(es) played on unknown. Source: []
Rules for classification: 1) points; 2) goal difference; 3) number of goals scored.
8 September 2019
13:00

Bang Mod	1–4	Aidin Sports Thailand

Rangsit University Stadium, Pathum Thani
8 September 2019
16:00

Rajapruk University	3–2	Nongkae Municipality

Rangsit University Stadium, Pathum Thani
14 September 2019
13:00

Nongkae Municipality	2–1	Bang Mod

Rangsit University Stadium, Pathum Thani
14 September 2019
16:00

Aidin Sports Thailand	1–0	Rajapruk University

Rangsit University Stadium, Pathum Thani
21 September 2019
13:00

Nongkae Municipality	1–4	Aidin Sports Thailand

Bangkok University Rangsit Campus Stadium, Pathum Thani
21 September 2019
13:00

Bang Mod	2–4	Rajapruk University

Kasem Bundit University Romklao Campus Stadium, Bangkok

== Upper western subregion ==
=== Qualification stage ===
Group A1

Pos	Team	Pld	W	D	L	GF	GA	GD	Pts	Qualification or relegation
1	Chainat City F.C.	2	1	1	0	4	2	+2	4	Group stage
2	Sakulmuangchai Pachee	2	1	0	1	4	4	0	3	Group stage
3	BSB Pakkret City	2	0	1	1	4	6	−2	1	

Updated to match(es) played on unknown. Source: []
Rules for classification: 1) points; 2) goal difference; 3) number of goals scored.
17 August 2019
16:00 (UTC+7)

Sakun Muang Chai Pachee	4–2	BSB Pakkret City

Nong Mamong Municipality Stadium, Chainat
25 August 2019
16:00 (UTC+7)

Chainat City	2–0	Sakulmuangchai Pachee

Khao Plong Stadium, Chainat
1 September 2019
16:00

Chainat City	2–2	BSB Pakkret City

Khao Plong Stadium, Chainat

Group A2

Pos	Team	Pld	W	D	L	GF	GA	GD	Pts	Qualification or relegation
1	Rakya Ang Thong United	2	2	0	0	3	1	+2	6	Group stage
2	Pakchong SCK	2	0	1	1	3	4	−1	1	
3	KT United	2	0	1	1	2	3	−1	1	

Updated to match(es) played on unknown. Source: []
Rules for classification: 1) points; 2) goal difference; 3) number of goals scored.
17 August 2019
13:00 (UTC+7)

KT United	2–2	Pakchong SCK

Nong Mamong Municipality Stadium, Chainat
25 August 2019
13:00 (UTC+7)

Rakya Ang Thong United	1–0	KT United

Khao Plong Stadium, Chainat
1 September 2019
13:00

Pakchong SCK	1–2	Rakya Ang Thong United

Khao Plong Stadium, Chainat

Group A3

Pos	Team	Pld	W	D	L	GF	GA	GD	Pts	Qualification or relegation
1	Nongkae Police	1	1	0	0	2	0	+2	3	Group stage
2	Saraburi Warriors	1	0	0	1	0	2	−2	0	
3	Samut Sakhon Warriors*	0	0	0	0	0	0	0	0	Withdrawn

Updated to match(es) played on unknown. Source: []
Rules for classification: 1) points; 2) goal difference; 3) number of goals scored.
17 August 2019
13:00 (UTC+7)

Nongkhae Police	2**–0	Saraburi Warriors

Lopburi PAO Stadium, Lopburi

*Samut Sakhon Warriors withdraw, so all match which Samut Sakhon Warriors will play is cancelled.

** Saraburi Warriors is forfeited due to fielding ineligible players at the match, the actual result is 2-1 to Saraburi Warriors.

Group B1

Pos	Team	Pld	W	D	L	GF	GA	GD	Pts	Qualification or relegation
1	Saraburi City	2	1	1	0	4	2	+2	4	Group stage
2	RMUTR	2	1	1	0	3	2	+1	4	Group stage
3	Ayothaya ARU City	2	0	0	2	2	5	−3	0	

Updated to match(es) played on unknown. Source: []
Rules for classification: 1) points; 2) goal difference; 3) number of goals scored.
18 August 2019
13:00 (UTC+7)

RMUTR	2–1	Ayothaya ARU City

Lopburi PAO Stadium, Lopburi
24 August 2019
16:00 (UTC+7)

Ayothaya ARU City	1–3	Saraburi City

Lopburi PAO Stadium, Lopburi
31 August 2019
16:00 (UTC+7)

Saraburi City	1–1	RMUTR

Ayutthaya Stadium, Ayutthaya

Group B2

Pos	Team	Pld	W	D	L	GF	GA	GD	Pts	Qualification or relegation
1	Kanjanapat	2	2	0	0	8	3	+5	6	Group stage
2	Ramkamhang University	2	1	0	1	3	5	−2	3	
3	Samurai United	2	0	0	2	3	6	−3	0	

Updated to match(es) played on unknown. Source: []
Rules for classification: 1) points; 2) goal difference; 3) number of goals scored.
18 August 2019
16:00 (UTC+7)

Samurai United	2–4	Kanjanapat

Lopburi PAO Stadium, Lopburi
25 August 2019
13:00 (UTC+7)

Kanjanapat	4–1	Ramkamhaeng University

Lopburi PAO Stadium, Lopburi
31 August 2019
13:00 (UTC+7)

Ramkamhaeng University	2–1	Samurai United

Ayutthaya Stadium, Ayutthaya

Group B3

Pos	Team	Pld	W	D	L	GF	GA	GD	Pts	Qualification or relegation
1	Patthana Nikom City	2	2	0	0	5	0	+5	6	Group stage
2	The Zero	2	1	0	1	2	3	−1	3	
3	Ayutthaya Baan Praek	2	0	0	2	1	5	−4	0	

Updated to match(es) played on unknown. Source: []
Rules for classification: 1) points; 2) goal difference; 3) number of goals scored.
17 August 2019
16:00 (UTC+7)

Patthana Nikom City	3–0	Ayutthaya Baan Praek

Lopburi PAO Stadium, Lopburi
25 August 2019
16:00 (UTC+7)

Patthana Nikom City	2–0	The Zero

Lopburi PAO Stadium, Lopburi
1 September 2019
13:00

The Zero	2–1	Ayutthaya Baan Praek

Ayutthaya Stadium, Ayutthaya

=== Group stage ===
Group A

Pos	Team	Pld	W	D	L	GF	GA	GD	Pts	Qualification or relegation
1	Chainat City	3	2	1	0	12	3	+9	7	Sub-regional final
2	Rakya Ang Thong United	3	2	1	0	11	3	+8	7	
3	Nongkae Police	3	1	0	2	7	14	−7	3	
4	Sakulmuangchai Pachee	3	0	0	3	6	16	−10	0	

Updated to match(es) played on unknown. Source: []
Rules for classification: 1) points; 2) goal difference; 3) number of goals scored.
7 September 2019
13:00

Nongkae Police	5–2	Sakulmuangchai Pachee

Khao Plong Stadium, Chainat
7 September 2019
16:00

Chainat City	0–0	Rakya Ang Thong United

Khao Plong Stadium, Chainat
14 September 2019
13:00

Rakya Ang Thong United	4–0	Nongkae Police

Nong Mamong Municipality Stadium, Chainat
14 September 2019
16:00

Sakulmuangchai Pachee	1–4	Chainat City

Nong Mamong Municipality Stadium, Chainat
21 September 2019
13:00

Sakulmuangchai Pachee	3–7	Rakya Ang Thong United

Ayutthaya Stadium, Ayutthaya
21 September 2019
13:00

Nongkae Police	2–8	Chainat City

Nong Mamong Stadium, Chainat

Group B

Pos	Team	Pld	W	D	L	GF	GA	GD	Pts	Qualification or relegation
1	Kanjanapat	3	2	1	0	4	2	+2	7	Sub-regional final
2	Saraburi City	3	1	2	0	5	2	+3	5	
3	RMUTR	3	1	1	1	3	2	+1	4	
4	Patthana Nikom City	3	0	0	3	3	9	−6	0	

Updated to match(es) played on unknown. Source: []
Rules for classification: 1) points; 2) goal difference; 3) number of goals scored.
8 September 2019
13:00

Patthana Nikom City	0–2	RMUTR

Saraburi PAO Stadium, Saraburi
8 September 2019
16:00

Saraburi City	0–0	Kanjanapat

Saraburi PAO Stadium, Saraburi
14 September 2019
13:00

RMUTR	0–0	Saraburi City

Lopburi PAO Stadium, Lopburi
14 September 2019
16:00

Kanjanapat	2–1	Patthana Nikom City

Lopburi PAO Stadium, Lopburi
21 September 2019
16:00

RMUTR	1–2	Kanjanapat

Ayutthaya Stadium, Ayutthaya
21 September 2019
16:00

Patthana Nikom City	2–5	Saraburi City

Nong Mamong Stadium, Chainat

== Lower western subregion ==
=== Qualifying round ===
Group A1

Pos	Team	Pld	W	D	L	GF	GA	GD	Pts	Qualification or relegation
1	Samut Songkhram United	2	2	0	0	9	3	+6	6	Group stage
2	Samut Songkhram Juniors F.C.	2	1	0	1	4	3	+1	3	
3	Bang Khuntian F.C.	2	0	0	2	2	9	−7	0	

Updated to match(es) played on unknown. Source: []
Rules for classification: 1) points; 2) goal difference; 3) number of goals scored.
17 August 2019
13:00 (UTC+7)

Samut Songkhram Juniors	1–3	Samut Songkhram United

Kasetsart University Kampang San Campus Stadium, Nakhon Pathom
24 August 2019
13:00 (UTC+7)

Bang Khuntian	0–3	Samut Songkhram Juniors

Kasetsart University Kampang San Campus Stadium, Nakhon Pathom
31 August 2019
16:00 (UTC+7)

Samut Songkhram United	6–2	Bang Khuntian F.C.

Kasetsart University Kampang San Campus Stadium, Nakhon Pathom

Group A2

Pos	Team	Pld	W	D	L	GF	GA	GD	Pts	Qualification or relegation
1	Sri Saman F.C.	2	1	1	0	3	2	+1	4	Group stage
2	Silpakorn University F.C.	2	1	1	0	2	1	+1	4	Group stage
3	STK Muang Nont F.C.	2	0	0	2	1	3	−2	0	

Updated to match(es) played on unknown. Source: []
Rules for classification: 1) points; 2) goal difference; 3) number of goals scored.
18 August 2019
16:00 (UTC+7)

Silpakorn University	1–0	STK Muang Nont

Kasetsart University Kampang San Campus Stadium, Nakhon Pathom
24 August 2019
16:00 (UTC+7)

STK Muang Nont	1–2	Sri Saman

Kasetsart University Kampang San Campus Stadium, Nakhon Pathom
31 August 2019
13:00 (UTC+7)

Sri Saman	1–1	Silpakorn University

Kasetsart University Kampang San Campus Stadium, Nakhon Pathom

Group A3

Pos	Team	Pld	W	D	L	GF	GA	GD	Pts	Qualification or relegation
1	Singha Rakang Thong Muangkan F.C.	2	1	1	0	5	3	+2	4	Group stage
2	West Town F.C.	2	1	0	1	5	4	+1	3	
3	Thung Kork F.C.	2	0	1	1	3	6	−3	1	

Updated to match(es) played on unknown. Source: []
Rules for classification: 1) points; 2) goal difference; 3) number of goals scored.
18 August 2019
13:00 (UTC+7)

Singha Rakang Thong Muang Kan	2–2	Thung Kork

Kasetsart University Kampang San Campus Stadium, Nakhon Pathom
25 August 2019
13:00 (UTC+7)

Thung Kork	1–4	West Town

Kasetsart University Kampang San Campus Stadium, Nakhon Pathom
1 September 2019
16:00

West Town	1–3	Singha Rakhang Thong Muang Kan

Kaset University Kampang San Campus Stadium, Nakhon Pathom

Group B1

Pos	Team	Pld	W	D	L	GF	GA	GD	Pts	Qualification or relegation
1	Bang Kae United	2	2	0	0	5	0	+5	6	Group stage
2	Tha Muang F.C.	2	1	0	1	3	3	0	3	
3	Nakhon Om Noi F.C.	2	0	0	2	1	6	−5	0	

Updated to match(es) played on unknown. Source: []
Rules for classification: 1) points; 2) goal difference; 3) number of goals scored.
18 August 2019
13:00 (UTC+7)

Nakhon Om Noi	1–3	Tha Muang

Pithak Nonthakhet Football Field, Nonthaburi
25 August 2019
13:00 (UTC+7)

Tha Muang	0–2	Bang Kae United

Pithak Nonthakhet Football Field, Nonthaburi
31 August 2019
16:00 (UTC+7)

Bang Kae United	3–0	Nakhon Om Noi

Pithak Nonthakhet Football Field, Nonthaburi

Group B2

Pos	Team	Pld	W	D	L	GF	GA	GD	Pts	Qualification or relegation
1	KU Kampang San	1	1	0	0	3	2	+1	3	Group stage
2	F.C. Khao Kampang	1	0	0	1	2	3	−1	0	Group stage
3	Samut Sakhon City	0	0	0	0	0	0	0	0	Withdrawn

Updated to match(es) played on unknown. Source: []
Rules for classification: 1) points; 2) goal difference; 3) number of goals scored.
17 August 2019
16:00 (UTC+7)

KU Kampang San	3–2	F.C. Khao Kampang

Kasetsart University Kampang San Campus Stadium, Nakhon Pathom

*Samut Sakhon City withdraws, so all match which include Samut Sakhon City is cancelled, and KU Kampang San qualified to the next round.

Group B3

Pos	Team	Pld	W	D	L	GF	GA	GD	Pts	Qualification or relegation
1	Taweewattana F.C.	2	2	0	0	10	0	+10	6	Group stage
2	MBF Ampawa F.C.	2	1	0	1	1	7	−6	3	
3	Yingcharoen F.C.	2	0	0	2	0	4	−4	0	

Updated to match(es) played on unknown. Source: []
Rules for classification: 1) points; 2) goal difference; 3) number of goals scored.
18 August 2019
16:00 (UTC+7)

Yingcharoen	0–3	Taweewattana

Pithak Nonthakhet Football Field, Nonthaburi
25 August 2019
16:00 (UTC+7)

Yingcharoen	0–1	MBF Amphawa

Pithak Nonthakhet Football Field, Nonthaburi
31 August 2019
16:00 (UTC+7)

MBF Amphawa	0–7	Taweewattana

Pithak Ninthakhet Football Field, Nonthaburi

=== Group stage ===
Group A

Pos	Team	Pld	W	D	L	GF	GA	GD	Pts	Qualification or relegation
1	Singha Rakhang Thong Muang Kan	3	2	1	0	8	2	+6	7	Sub-regional final
2	Sri Saman	3	1	1	1	5	6	−1	4	
3	Samut Songkhram United	3	1	1	1	3	4	−1	4	
4	Silpakorn University	3	0	1	2	4	8	−4	1	

Updated to match(es) played on unknown. Source: []
Rules for classification: 1) points; 2) goal difference; 3) number of goals scored.
7 September 2019
13:00

Samut Songkhram United	0–0	Sri Saman

Kleeb Bua Stadium, Kanchanaburi
7 September 2019
16:00

Singha Rakhang Thong Muang Kan	1–1	Silpakorn University

Kleeb Bua Stadium, Kanchanaburi
14 September 2019
13:00

Silpakorn University	1–2	Samut Songkhram United

Kleeb Bua Stadium, Kanchanaburi
14 September 2019
16:00

Sri Saman	0–4	Singha Rakhang Thong Muang Kan

Kleeb Bua Stadium, Kanchanaburi
21 September 2019
13:00

Singha Rakhang Thong Muang Kan	3–1	Samut Songkhram United

Kasetsart University Kampang San Campus Stadium, Nakhon Pathom
21 September 2019
13:00

Silpakorn University	2–5	Sri Saman

Kleeb Bua Stadium, Kanchanaburi

Group B

Pos	Team	Pld	W	D	L	GF	GA	GD	Pts	Qualification or relegation
1	Taweewattana F.C.	3	3	0	0	7	0	+7	9	Sub-regional final
2	KU Kampang San	3	2	0	1	8	5	+3	6	
3	F.C. Khao Kampang	3	1	0	2	2	3	−1	3	
4	Bang Kae United	3	0	0	3	3	12	−9	0	

Updated to match(es) played on unknown. Source: []
Rules for classification: 1) points; 2) goal difference; 3) number of goals scored.
15 September 2019
16:00

KU Kampamg San	0–3	Taweewattana

Kasetsart University Kampang San Campus Stadium, Nakhon Pathom
15 September 2019
13:00

Bang Kae United	1–2	F.C. Khao Kampang

Kasetsart University Kampang San Campus Stadium, Nakhon Pathom
18 September 2019
13:00

Taweewattana	3–0	Bang Kae United

Kasetsart University Kampang San Campus Stadium, Nakhon Pathom
18 September 2019
16:00

F.C. Khao Kampang	0–1	KU Kampang San

Kasetsart University Kampang San Campus Stadium, Nakhon Pathom
21 September 2019
16:00

KU Kampang San	7–2	Bang Kae United

Kasetsart University Kampang San Campus Stadium, Nakhon Pathom
21 September 2019
16:00

Taweewattana	1–0	F.C. Khao Kampang

Kleeb Bua Stadium, Kanchanaburi

== Upper southern subregion ==
=== Qualifying round ===
Group A1

Pos	Team	Pld	W	D	L	GF	GA	GD	Pts	Qualification or relegation
1	Srivichai F.C.	2	2	0	0	5	2	+3	6	Group stage
2	Andaman Blue Marlin Phuket	2	0	1	1	2	3	−1	1	
3	BPN Bang Saphan Noi United	2	0	1	1	0	2	−2	1	

Updated to match(es) played on unknown. Source: []
Rules for classification: 1) points; 2) goal difference; 3) number of goals scored.
17 August 2019
16:00 (UTC+7)

Andaman Blue Marlin Phuket	0–0	BPN Bang Saphan Noi United

Surakul Stadium, Phuket
25 August 2019
16:00 (UTC+7)

BPN Bang Saphan Noi United	0–2	Srivichai

Surat Thani Stadium, Surat Thani
1 September 2019
16:00

Srivichai	3–2	Andaman Blue Marlin Phuket

Surat Thani Stadium, Surat Thani

Group B1

Pos	Team	Pld	W	D	L	GF	GA	GD	Pts	Qualification or relegation
1	Plai Phraya City	1	0	1	0	1	1	0	1	Group stage
2	Khun Thalay SRU	1	0	1	0	1	1	0	1	Group stage
3	Surat Thani United	0	0	0	0	0	0	0	0	Withdrawn

Updated to match(es) played on unknown. Source: []
Rules for classification: 1) points; 2) goal difference; 3) number of goals scored.
17 August 2019
13:00 (UTC+7)

Plai Phraya City	1–1	Khun Thalay SRU

Surakul Stadium, Phuket

*Surat Thani United withdrew, so Plai Phraya City and Khun Thalay SRU qualified to group stage.

=== Group stage ===
Group A

Pos	Team	Pld	W	D	L	GF	GA	GD	Pts	Qualification or relegation
1	Patong City	3	3	0	0	10	4	+6	9	Sub-regional final
2	Srivichai F.C.	3	2	0	1	9	5	+4	6	
3	Koh Samui City	3	1	0	2	4	7	−3	3	
4	Khun Thalay United	3	0	0	3	3	10	−7	0	

Updated to match(es) played on unknown. Source: []
Rules for classification: 1) points; 2) goal difference; 3) number of goals scored.
8 September 2019
13:00

Koh Samui City	1–2	Patong City

Surat Thani Stadium, Surat Thani
8 September 2019
16:00

Khun Thalay United	1–3	Srivichai

Surat Thani Stadium, Surat Thani
14 September 2019
13:00

Patong City	5–1	Khun Thalay United

Surat Thani Stadium, Surat Thani
14 September 2019
16:00

Srivichai	4–1	Koh Samui City

Surat Thani Stadium, Surat Thani
21 September 2019
13:00

Khun Thalay United	1–2	Koh Samui City

Nakhon Si Thammarat Rajabhat University Stadium, Nakhon Si Thammarat
21 September 2019
13:00

Patong City	3–2	Srivichai

Phang Nga Stadium, Phang Nga

Group B

Pos	Team	Pld	W	D	L	GF	GA	GD	Pts	Qualification or relegation
1	Phang Nga United	3	2	1	0	6	0	+6	7	Sub-regional final
2	Nakhon Si NSRU City	3	2	0	1	3	2	+1	6	
3	Khun Thalay SRU	3	1	0	2	4	8	−4	3	
4	Plai Phraya City	3	0	1	2	1	4	−3	1	

Updated to match(es) played on unknown. Source: []
Rules for classification: 1) points; 2) goal difference; 3) number of goals scored.
8 September 2019
13:00

Plai Phraya City	1–3	Khun Thalay SRU

Nakhon Si Thammarat Rajabhat University Stadium, Nakhon Si Thammarat
8 September 2019
16:00

Nakhon Si NSRU City	0–1	Phang Nga United

Nakhon Si Thammarat Rajabhat University Stadium, Nakhon Si Thammarat
14 September 2019
13:00

Khun Thalay SRU	1–2	Nakhon Si NSRU City

Phang Nga Stadium, Phang Nga
14 September 2019
16:00

Phang Nga United	0–0	Plai Phraya City

Phang Nga Stadium, Phang Nga
21 September 2019
16:00

Nakhon Si NSRU City	1–0	Plai Phraya City

Nakhon Si Thammarat Rajabhat University Stadium, Nakhon Si Thammarat
21 September 2019
16:00

Phang Nga United	5–0	Khun Thalay SRU

Phang Nga Stadium, Phang Nga

== Lower southern subregion ==
=== Group stage ===
Group A

Pos	Team	Pld	W	D	L	GF	GA	GD	Pts	Qualification or relegation
1	Songkhla	3	2	0	1	10	5	+5	6	Sub-regional final
2	Songkhla Aslan TSU	3	2	0	1	8	3	+5	6	
3	Suea Tai United	3	2	0	1	12	2	+10	6	
4	Nakhon Si Warriors	3	0	0	3	0	22	−22	0	

Updated to match(es) played on unknown. Source: []
Rules for classification: 1) points; 2) goal difference; 3) number of goals scored.
8 September 2019
13:00

Songkhla	7–0	Nakhon Si Warriors

Songkhla Rajabhat University Stadium, Songkhla
8 September 2019
16:00

Songkhla Aslan TSU	0–1	Suea Tai United

Songkhla Rajabhat University Stadium, Songkhla
14 September 2019
13:00

Nakhon Si Warriors	0–5	Songkhla Aslan TSU

Songkhla Rajabhat University Stadium, Songkhla

14 September 2019
16:00

Suea Tai United	1–2	Songkhla

Songkhla Rajabhat University Stadium, Songkhla
21 September 2019
13:00

Nakhon Si Warriors	0–10	Suea Tai United

Nathawee Municipality Stadium, Songkhla
21 September 2019
13:00

Songkhla Aslan TSU	3–2	Songkhla

Songkhla Rajabhat University Stadium, Songkhla

Group B

Pos	Team	Pld	W	D	L	GF	GA	GD	Pts	Qualification or relegation
1	Jantrangcee Saba Yoi City	3	1	2	0	2	1	+1	5	Sub-regional final
2	Narathiwat	3	1	1	1	3	2	+1	4	
3	Nathawee City	3	1	1	1	1	2	−1	4	
4	Siritham Witthaya School	3	0	2	1	2	3	−1	2	

Updated to match(es) played on unknown. Source: []
Rules for classification: 1) points; 2) goal difference; 3) number of goals scored.
8 September 2019
13:00

Siritham Witthaya School	1–1	Narathiwat

Na Thawi Municipality Stadium, Songkhla
8 September 2019
16:00

Jantrangcee Saba Yoi City	0–0	Nathawee City

Na Thawi Municipality Stadium, Songkhla
14 September 2019
13:00

Siritham Witthaya School	1–1	Jantrangcee Saba Yoi City

Maharaj Stadium, Narathiwat
14 September 2019
16:00

Narathiwat	2–0	Nathawee City

Maharaj Stadium, Narathiwat
21 September 2019
16:00

Nathawee City	1–0	Siritham Witthaya School

Na Thawi Municipality Stadium, Songkhla
21 September 2019
16:00

Narathiwat	0–1	Jantrangcee Saba Yoi City

Songkhla Rajabhat University, Songkhla

== Subregional final ==
Upper northern subregion final
6 September 2019

Chiangrai Lanna	2–0	JT

Huai Ma Stadium, Phrae

The actual finalist Singha Nuea Chiang Mai was 0-2 forfeited by JT due to fielding an ineligible player.

Lower northern subregion final
29 September 2019
16:00

Northern Tak United	1–2	SA Pitsanulok

Huai Ma Stadium, Phrae
Upper northeastern subregion final
29 September 2019
13:00

Kranuan	1–5	UD Nonghan

Khon Kaen University Stadium, Khon Kaen
Lower northeastern subregion final
29 September 2019
16:00

Krua Napas Ubon	1–4	Suranaree Army II

Khon Kaen University Stadium, Khon Kaen
Upper eastern subregion final
29 September 2019
13:00

Prachinburi City	2–2	Nakhon Nayok
Penalties
	4-2

Sa Kaeo PAO Stadium, Sa Kaeo
Lower eastern subregion final
29 September 2019
16:00

Muang Pattaya	0–5	ACDC

Sa Kaeo PAO Stadium, Sa Kaeo
Bangkok Metro final
28 September 2019
13:00

Phoenix F.C.	0–4	Royal Thai Air Force

King Mongkut's University of Technology North Bangkok Football Field, Bangkok
Perimeter final
28 September 2019
16:00

Romklao United	4–1	Aidin Sports Thailand

King Mongkut's University of Technology North Bangkok Football Field, Bangkok
Upper western subregion final
29 September 2019
13:00

Chainat City	0–2	Kanjanapat

Kleeb Bua Stadium, Kanchanaburi
Lower western subregion final
29 September 2019
16:00

Singh Rakhang Thong Muang Kan	0–0	Taweewattana
Penalties
	6-5

Kleeb Bua Stadium, Kanchanaburi
Upper southern subregion final
29 September 2019
13:00

Patong City	2–0	Phang Nga United

Surat Thani Stadium, Surat Thani
Lower southern subregion final
29 September 2019
16:00

Songkhla	2–1	Jantrangcee Saba Yoi City

Surat Thani Stadium, Surat Thani

== Final ==
=== Northern region ===
3rd place play-off
6 October 2019

JT	1–2	Northern Tak United

Final
6 October 2019

Chiangrai Lanna	1–1	SA Pitsanulok
Penalties
	2-4

=== Northeastern region ===
3rd place play-off
6 October 2019
13:00

Kranuan	0–0	Krua Napas Ubon
Penalties
	5-4

Khon Kaen University Stadium, Khon Kaen
Final
6 October 2019
16:00

UD Nonghan	2–1	Suranaree Army II

Khon Kaen University Stadium, Khon Kaen

=== Eastern region ===
3rd place play-off
6 October 2019
13:00

Nakhon Nayok	2–2	Muang Pattaya
Penalties
	1-4

Fighting Fish Stadium, Chachoengsao
Final
6 October 2019
16:00

Prachinburi City	1–1	ACDC
Penalties
	3-4

Fighting Fish Stadium, Chachoengsao

=== Bangkok & fields region ===
3rd place play-off
6 October 2019
13:00

Phoenix	1–3	Aidin Sports Thailand

Bangkok University Rangsit Campus Stadium, Pathum Thani
Final
6 October 2019
16:00

Royal Thai Air Force	0–0	Romklao United
Penalties
	5-4

Bangkok University Rangsit Campus Stadium, Pathum Thani

=== Western region ===
3rd place play-off
6 October 2019
13:00

Chainat City	2–2	Taweewattana
Penalties
	1-3

Ayutthaya Stadium, Ayutthaya
Final
6 October 2019
16:00

Kanjanapat	4–1	Singha Rakhang Thong Muang Kan

Ayutthaya Stadium, Ayutthaya

=== Southern region ===
3rd place play-off
6 October 2019
13:00

Phang Nga United	4–3	Jantrangcee Saba Yoi City

Surat Thani Stadium, Surat Thani
Final
6 October 2019
16:00

Patong City	0–2 (a.e.t.)	Songkhla

Surat Thani Stadium, Surat Thani

== Championship stage ==
=== Group A ===
Pos	Team	Pld	W	D	L	GF	GA	GD	Pts	Qualification or relegation
1	UD Nonghan	2	2	0	0	6	3	+3	6	Final
2	ACDC	2	1	0	1	4	3	+1	3	
3	SA Pitsanulok	2	0	0	2	3	7	−4	0	

Updated to match(es) played on unknown. Source: []
Rules for classification: 1) points; 2) goal difference; 3) number of goals scored.
13 October 2019
16:00

UD Nonghan	2–1	ACDC

Nong Bua Lamphu Stadium, Nong Bua Lamphu
20 October 2019
16:00

ACDC	3–1	SA Pitsanulok

Sattahip Navy Stadium, Chonburi
27 October 2019
16:00

SA Pitsanulok	2–4	UD Nonghan

Naresuan University Stadium, Pitsanulok

=== Group B ===
Pos	Team	Pld	W	D	L	GF	GA	GD	Pts	Qualification or relegation
1	Royal Thai Air Force	2	2	0	0	3	1	+2	6	Final
2	Songkhla	2	1	0	1	5	3	+2	3	
3	Kanjanapat	2	0	0	2	3	7	−4	0	

Updated to match(es) played on unknown. Source: []
Rules for classification: 1) points; 2) goal difference; 3) number of goals scored.
13 October 2019
16:00

Kanjanapat	1–2	Royal Thai Air Force

Bangkok University Rangsit Campus Stadium, Pathum Thani
20 October 2019
16:00

Royal Thai Air Force	1–0	Songkhla

Thupatemee Stadium, Pathum Thani
27 October 2019
16:00

Songkhla	5–2	Kanjanapat

Southern Main Stadium (Phru Kangkao), Hat Yai, Songkhla

=== Final ===
16:00

UD Nonghan	0–2	Royal Thai Air Force

Bangkok University Rangsit Campus Stadium, Pathum Thani

== Promoted clubs ==
According to FA Thailand's declaration about promoting clubs to the 2020 Thai League 4 (T4) by considerate number of participating clubs in each regions, FAT revealed that there will be nine clubs to promote to the next season of T4 League.

- SA Pitsanulok (Northern winner)
- Chiangrai Lanna (Northern runner-up)
- Northern Tak United (Northern third place)
- UD Nonghan (Northeastern winner)
- ACDC (Eastern winner)
- Royal Thai Air Force (Bangkok & fields winner)
- Kanjanapat (Western winner)
- Singha Rakhang Thong Muang Kan (Western runner-up)
- Songkhla (Southern winner)
- Patong City (Southern runner-up)
