= Veerawong Leksuntorn =

Thai footballer (born 1991)

Personal information
- Full name: Veerawong Leksuntorn
- Date of birth: 5 December 1991 (age 34)
- Place of birth: Roi Et, Thailand
- Height: 1.80 m (5 ft 11 in)
- Position: Attacking midfielder

Team information
- Current team: Ayutthaya United
- Number: 8

Youth career
- 2010–2012: Bangkok Christian College

Senior career*
Years	Team	Apps	(Gls)
2013	Roi Et United	21	(0)
2014–2015	TOT	50	(1)
2016	Air Force Central	16	(2)
2017	BBCU	1	(0)
2017–2018	Angthong	42	(2)
2019	Srivichai	15	(1)
2020–	Ayutthaya United	2	(0)
- * Club domestic league appearances and goals

Veerawong Leksuntorn (Thai: วีรวงศ์ เล็กสุนทร, born 5 December 1991) is a Thai professional footballer who plays as an attacking midfielder for Thai League 2 club Ayutthaya United.
