= Apichad Thaveechalermdit =

Thai footballer (born 1965)

Personal information
- Full name: Apichad Thaveechalermdit
- Date of birth: 10 January 1965 (age 61)
- Place of birth: Surat Thani, Thailand
- Height: 1.67 m (5 ft 6 in)
- Position: Midfielder

Youth career
- 1981–1988: Surat Thani

Senior career*
Years	Team	Apps	(Gls)
1989–1995	Royal Thai Army		
1996–2002	Bangkok Bank		
2003–2007	Surat Thani		
2008	Bangkok Bank		
2009–2010	Surat Thani		
2011	Nakhon Si Thammarat		
2012	Surat Thani		
2013	Phrae United		
2014	Surat Thani		
2018	Srivichai		
2019–2020	Surat Thani City		

International career
1989–1996	Thailand	?	(0)
Medal record
Thailand national football team
Sea Games
Gold medal – first place	Sea Games 1993	Football
Gold medal – first place	Sea Games 1995	Football
- * Club domestic league appearances and goals

Apichad Thaveechalermdit (Thai: อภิชาติ ทวีเฉลิมดิษฐ์, born 10 January 1965), is a Thai former football midfielder who played for Thailand in the 1996 Asian Cup.

== Honours ==
Bangkok Bank

- Thai Premier League: 1996

Thailand

- Sea Games: 1993, 1995
- ASEAN Football Championship: 1996
- Asian Games 4th: 1998
- King's Cup: 1994
- Independence Cup (Indonesia): 1994
