= Chiang Mai City F.C. =

Thai football club

Chiangmai City เชียงใหม่ ซิตี้
- Full name: Chiangmai City Football Club สโมสรฟุตบอลเชียงใหม่ ซิตี้
- Nickname(s): The Dangerous Panda แพนด้ามหาภัย
- Founded: 2017; 8 years ago
- Ground: ?, Chiang Mai Thailand
- League: 2018 Thailand Amateur League Northern Region

Chiang Mai City Football Club (Thai สโมสรฟุตบอลเชียงใหม่ ซิตี้), is a Thai football club based in, Chiang Mai Thailand. The club is currently playing in the 2018 Thailand Amateur League Northern Region.

== Record ==
Season	League									FA Cup	League Cup	Top goalscorer	
Season	Division	P	W	D	L	F	A	Pts	Pos	FA Cup	League Cup	Name	Goals
2017	TA North	1	0	0	1	1	5	0	13th - 21st	Not Enter	Can't Enter		
2018	TA North	1	0	0	1	0	7	0	26th	Not Enter	Can't Enter	none	0

Champions	Runners-up	Promoted	Relegated
