= Srivichai F.C. =

Thai football club

Srivichai ศรีวิชัย
- Full name: Srivichai Football Club สโมสรฟุตบอลศรีวิชัย
- Founded: 2017; 9 years ago
- Ground: Surat Thani Stadium; Surat Thani, Thailand
- Capacity: 10,175
- Chairman: Samart Sornduang
- Head Coach: Sanit Soonki
- League: Thailand Amateur League

Srivichai Football Club (Thai สโมสรฟุตบอลศรีวิชัย), is a Thai football club based in Surat Thani, Thailand. The club is currently playing in the 2018 Thailand Amateur League Southern Region.

== Record ==
| Season | League | | | | | | | | | FA Cup | League Cup | Top goalscorer | |
| Season | Division | P | W | D | L | F | A | Pts | Pos | FA Cup | League Cup | Name | Goals |
|---|---|---|---|---|---|---|---|---|---|---|---|---|---|
| 2017 | TA South | 3 | 2 | 0 | 1 | 6 | 4 | 6 | 2nd | Not Enter | Can't Enter | | |
| 2018 | TA South | 3 | 2 | 0 | 1 | 8 | 5 | 6 | 2nd | QR | Can't Enter | | |

== Current squad ==
| No. | Pos. | Name | No. | Pos. | Name |
|---|---|---|---|---|---|
| 1 | GK | (Thailand) Saini Almart | 21 | GK | (Thailand) Jakkrapong Krudjon |
| 2 | MF | (Thailand) Apichad Thaveechalermdit | 22 | DF | (Thailand) Sithichai Boontanai |
| 3 | DF | (Thailand) Pisut Binlee | 23 | MF | (Thailand) Shinnawattana Kotchsungneon |
| 4 | DF | (Thailand) Pongpan Rattanachot-amphai | 24 | MF | (Thailand) Prakij Kobwattanakul |
| 5 | DF | (Thailand) Komkrit Sommitr | 25 | MF | (Thailand) Ekkasit Saisa-ard |
| 6 | DF | (Thailand) Anusorn Suksane | | | |
| 7 | MF | (Thailand) Chaiwat Sayamon | | | |
| 8 | MF | (Thailand) Noppadon Phioukham | | | |
| 9 | FW | (Thailand) Watchara Thongsuksane | | | |
| 10 | FW | (Thailand) Yossakorn Samphan | | | |
| 11 | MF | (Thailand) Seksan Suksuea | | | |
| 12 | MF | (Thailand) Wisarut Wangkaeo | | | |
| 13 | MF | (Thailand) Kiattisak Saadsungneon | | | |
| 14 | DF | (Thailand) Jakkraphan Wanghin | | | |
| 15 | DF | (Thailand) Nawapruek Pethkong | | | |
| 16 | DF | (Thailand) Attaphol Nakhtae | | | |
| 17 | FW | (Thailand) Todsaporn Rueangsri | | | |
| 18 | GK | (Thailand) Patcharakorn Boonchum | | | |
| 19 | DF | (Thailand) Jiracheep Boonthong | | | |
| 20 | FW | (Thailand) Mana Luckchum | | | |

| Champions | Runners-up | Promoted | Relegated |
